= 2016–17 EuroLeague regular season =

The 2016–17 EuroLeague Regular Season were played from 12 October 2016 to 7 April 2017. A total of 16 teams competed in the regular season to decide the eight places of the playoffs.

== Format ==
In the regular season, teams played against each other home-and-away in a round-robin format. The eight first qualified teams advanced to the Playoffs, while the last eight qualified teams were eliminated. The matchdays are from 12 October 2016 to 7 April 2017.

=== Tiebreakers ===
When all teams have played each other twice:

1. Best record in head-to-head games between all tied teams.
2. Higher cumulative score difference in head-to-head games between all tied teams.
3. Higher cumulative score difference for the entire regular season.
4. Higher total of points scored for the entire regular season.
5. Higher sum of quotients of points in favor and points against of each match played in the regular season.

If a tiebreaker does not resolve a tie completely, a new tiebreak process is initiated with only those teams that remain tied. All points scored in extra periods will not be counted in the standings, nor for any tie-break situation.

== League table ==
Pos	Team	Pld	W	L	PF	PA	PD	Qualification
1	(Spain) Real Madrid	30	23	7	2585	2353	+232	Advance to Playoffs
2	(Russia) CSKA Moscow	30	22	8	2608	2355	+253	Advance to Playoffs
3	(Greece) Olympiacos	30	19	11	2330	2221	+109	Advance to Playoffs
4	(Greece) Panathinaikos Superfoods	30	19	11	2263	2187	+76	Advance to Playoffs
5	(Turkey) Fenerbahçe	30	18	12	2256	2233	+23	Advance to Playoffs
6	(Turkey) Anadolu Efes	30	17	13	2472	2467	+5	Advance to Playoffs
7	(Spain) Baskonia	30	17	13	2445	2376	+69	Advance to Playoffs
8	(Turkey) Darüşşafaka Doğuş	30	16	14	2358	2353	+5	Advance to Playoffs
9	(Serbia) Crvena zvezda mts	30	16	14	2203	2196	+7	
10	(Lithuania) Žalgiris	30	14	16	2350	2391	−41	
11	(Spain) FC Barcelona Lassa	30	12	18	2134	2232	−98	
12	(Turkey) Galatasaray Odeabank	30	11	19	2345	2475	−130	
13	(Germany) Brose Bamberg	30	10	20	2369	2404	−35	
14	(Israel) Maccabi Tel Aviv	30	10	20	2333	2493	−160	
15	(Russia) UNICS	30	8	22	2288	2408	−120	
16	(Italy) EA7 Emporio Armani Milan	30	8	22	2411	2606	−195	

Source: EuroLeague
Rules for classification: All points scored in extra period(s) will not be counted in the standings, nor for any tie-break situation.

=== Positions by round ===
The table lists the positions of teams after completion of each round.

Team \ Round	1	2	3	4	5	6	7	8	9	10	11	12	13	14	15	16	17	18	19	20	21	22	23	24	25	26	27	28	29	30
(Spain) Real Madrid	2	2	3	3	2	2	2	2	2	2	2	2	2	2	2	2	2	2	1	1	1	1	1	1	1	1	1	1	1	1
(Russia) CSKA Moscow	1	1	1	1	1	1	1	1	1	1	1	1	1	1	1	1	1	1	2	2	2	2	2	2	2	2	2	2	2	2
(Greece) Olympiacos	15	5	4	4	5	8	5	4	6	4	4	3	3	3	3	4	3	3	3	3	3	3	3	3	3	3	3	3	3	3
(Greece) Panathinaikos Superfoods	3	7	7	5	4	4	6	8	5	7	6	6	5	4	5	6	5	6	6	7	6	5	5	5	6	6	6	5	4	4
(Turkey) Fenerbahçe	8	4	2	2	3	7	9	6	3	3	3	5	6	6	6	5	6	5	4	4	4	4	4	4	4	4	4	4	7	5
(Turkey) Anadolu Efes	9	15	15	13	13	14	12	12	11	9	7	8	8	8	9	9	9	10	9	9	8	8	7	7	8	8	7	6	6	6
(Spain) Baskonia	7	12	8	10	8	3	4	3	8	5	5	4	4	5	4	3	4	4	7	6	7	7	8	8	5	5	5	7	5	7
(Turkey) Darüşşafaka Doğuş	5	9	6	7	7	6	3	5	7	8	9	7	7	7	7	8	8	8	8	8	9	9	9	9	9	9	9	9	9	8
(Serbia) Crvena zvezda mts	12	10	5	8	11	12	11	9	10	12	12	9	10	9	8	7	7	7	5	5	5	6	6	6	7	7	8	8	8	9
(Lithuania) Žalgiris	14	11	13	14	15	15	14	15	13	11	11	13	9	12	12	12	13	13	12	10	10	10	10	10	10	10	10	10	10	10
(Spain) FC Barcelona Lassa	4	6	12	9	6	5	8	11	12	10	10	11	12	10	10	11	12	9	10	11	12	12	11	11	11	11	12	11	11	11
(Turkey) Galatasaray Odeabank	16	16	16	16	16	16	16	16	14	15	16	15	16	16	16	16	15	16	14	16	16	14	15	13	14	13	11	13	13	12
(Germany) Brose Bamberg	10	8	10	12	10	11	13	13	15	16	14	12	13	11	11	10	10	12	11	12	11	11	12	12	12	12	14	12	12	13
(Israel) Maccabi Tel Aviv	11	13	11	6	9	10	10	7	4	6	8	10	11	14	14	13	14	14	15	14	14	13	13	14	13	14	13	14	14	14
(Russia) UNICS	13	14	14	15	14	13	15	14	16	14	15	16	14	13	13	14	11	11	13	13	13	15	14	15	15	15	15	15	16	15
(Italy) EA7 Emporio Armani Milan	6	3	9	11	12	9	7	10	9	13	13	14	15	15	15	15	16	15	16	15	15	16	16	16	16	16	16	16	15	16

=== Result ===
Home \ Away	(Spain) RMB	(Russia) CSK	(Greece) OLY	(Greece) PAO	(Turkey) FNB	(Turkey) EFS	(Spain) BKN	(Turkey) DDI	(Serbia) CZV	(Lithuania) ZAL	(Spain) FCB	(Turkey) GSO	(Germany) BRO	(Israel) MTA	(Russia) UNK	(Italy) EA7
(Spain) Real Madrid	—	95–85	83–65	87–84	61–56	97–80	87–91	101–83	98–68	96–91	85–69^{a}	90–81	95–72	80–75	89–75	94–89
(Russia) CSKA Moscow	91–90	—	90–86	81–77	79–95^{OT}	80–77	112–84	95–85	102–80	95–86	92–76	85–69	85–64	93–81	98–80	101–64
(Greece) Olympiacos	73–79	75–81	—	77–69^{a}	71–62	90–66	92–62	81–73	73–65	73–64	59–52	71–80	83–77	73–80	88–59	91–81
(Greece) Panathinaikos Superfoods	88–82	85–80^{OT}	77–79^{a}	—	81–70	92–81^{OT}	69–68	86–80	70–59	84–76	71–65	85–58	81–72	83–75^{OT}	83–82	74–61
(Turkey) Fenerbahçe	78–77	77–71	67–64	84–63	—	88–80	67–64	64–71	87–72	82–68	68–65^{OT}	85–80^{a}	67–66	79–81	73–81	86–79
(Turkey) Anadolu Efes	78–80	87–93	77–69	91–83^{OT}	72–68	—	96–85	93–81	100–79	71–84	80–77	84–73	68–87	92–87	104–99	90–86
(Spain) Baskonia	71–79	79–78	90–95	63–72	86–52	85–84	—	73–52	69–87	63–72	65–62	69–62	81–74	101–88	102–70	87–74
(Turkey) Darüşşafaka Doğuş	81–68	91–83	71–77	77–72	72–65	79–84	98–89	—	78–62	66–69	67–56	73–67	72–70	86–84	71–64	80–81
(Serbia) Crvena zvezda mts	82–70	78–67	64–66^{OT}	72–66	75–73	72–86	63–70	70–73	—	79–88	76–65	77–58	74–60	83–58	83–65	83–70
(Lithuania) Žalgiris	59–74	79–74	75–88	64–58	67–76	68–76	78–73	80–83	61–77	—	89–85	87–75	86–72	74–87	80–88	84–88
(Spain) FC Barcelona Lassa	63–102^{a}	61–85	67–69	72–57	72–73	89–78	79–93	81–77	67–54	92–86	—	62–69	78–74	76–71	70–62	89–75
(Turkey) Galatasaray Odeabank	87–84	84–109	89–87	79–84	87–103^{a}	76–86	80–103	85–81	83–85	87–79	78–64	—	75–90	102–63	75–67	83–80
(Germany) Brose Bamberg	89–91	88–90	82–68	82–83	78–83	91–83	71–96	97–99^{OT}	78–79	86–91	85–65	79–84	—	90–75	89–86	106–102^{OT}
(Israel) Maccabi Tel Aviv	82–89	76–80	71–82	61–81	87–77	77–86	85–84	93–92	67–71	77–93	69–79	98–92	70–85	—	60–52	92–82
(Russia) UNICS	77–81	74–85	75–90	83–81	81–86	92–99^{OT}	91–92	87–94	65–62	80–82	63–69	73–60	63–58	73–74	—	100–79
(Italy) EA7 Emporio Armani Milan	90–101	64–79	99–83	72–86	70–79	105–92	88–76	89–87	71–78	70–78	78–83	92–87	76–84	99–97	68–91	—

Source: EuroLeague

== Matches ==
=== Round 1 ===
12 October 2016	Real Madrid (Spain)	83–65	(Greece) Olympiacos	Madrid
21:00 (CEST)	Scoring by quarter: 24–17, 18–23, 20–13, 21–12
	Pts: Llull 22; Rebs: Fernández 7 Asts: Fernández, Llull 4 PIR: Llull 20	Boxscore	Pts: Lojeski 14; Rebs: Birch 10; Asts: Spanoulis 5 PIR: Spanoulis 14	Arena: Barclaycard Center; Attendance: 11,723; Referees: Luigi Lamonica (ITA), Robert Lottermosser (GER), Oļegs Latiševs (LAT)

13 October 2016	Galatasaray Odeabank (Turkey)	84–109	(Russia) CSKA Moscow	Istanbul
19:00 (CEST)	Scoring by quarter: 18–27, 27–30, 26–24, 13–28
	Pts: Güler 16; Rebs: Tyus 5 Asts: Güler, Schilb 5 PIR: Güler 21	Boxscore	Pts: de Colo 22; Rebs: Kurbanov 8 Asts: Teodosić 11; PIR: de Colo 24	Arena: Abdi İpekçi Arena; Attendance: 9,523; Referees: Juan Carlos García González (ESP), Matej Boltauzer (SLO), Tomislav Hordov (CRO)

13 October 2016	EA7 Emporio Armani Milan (Italy)	99–97	(Israel) Maccabi Tel Aviv	Assago
20:00 (CEST)	Scoring by quarter: 25–24, 19–20, 28–21, 27–32
	Pts: Hickman 22; Rebs: Pascolo 6 Asts: Simon 9 PIR: Hickman 32	Boxscore	Pts: Goudelock 27; Rebs: Smith 7 Asts: Goudelock 5 PIR: Goudelock 33	Arena: Mediolanum Forum; Attendance: 8,777; Referees: Ilija Belošević (SRB), Damir Javor (SLO), Emin Moğulkoç (TUR)

13 October 2016	Crvena zvezda mts (Serbia)	70–73	(Turkey) Darüşşafaka Doğuş	Belgrade
21:00 (CEST)	Scoring by quarter: 24–17, 20–13, 8–16, 18–27
	Pts: Kuzmić 16; Rebs: Kuzmić 9 Asts: Jović 7 PIR: Kuzmić 24	Boxscore	Pts: Clyburn 19; Rebs: Moerman 11; Asts: Wanamaker 4 PIR: Clyburn 19	Arena: Aleksandar Nikolić; Attendance: 5,823; Referees: Miguel Pérez Pérez (ESP), Elias Koromilas (GRE), Jurgis Laurinavičius (LTU)

14 October 2016	UNICS (Russia)	63–69	(Spain) FC Barcelona Lassa	Kazan
18:00 (CEST)	Scoring by quarter: 21–23, 15–11, 15–9, 12–26
	Pts: Langford 14; Rebs: Williams 15; Asts: Ponkrashov 6 PIR: Williams 25	Boxscore	Pts: Doellman 23; Rebs: Tomić 9 Asts: Rice 9 PIR: Doellman, Tomić 25	Arena: Basket Hall Kazan; Attendance: 5,801; Referees: Saša Pukl (SLO), Piotr Pastusiak (POL), Robert Vyklický (CZE)

14 October 2016	Fenerbahçe (Turkey)	67–66	(Germany) Brose Bamberg	Istanbul
19:30 (CEST)	Scoring by quarter: 18–22, 18–11, 17–18, 14–15
	Pts: Bogdanović 18; Rebs: Udoh 7 Asts: Sloukas 4 PIR: Bogdanović 19	Boxscore	Pts: Miller 17; Rebs: Melli 12; Asts: Zisis 5 PIR: Miller 20	Arena: Fenerbahçe Ülker Sports Arena; Attendance: 11,127; Referees: Sreten Radović (CRO), Fernando Rocha (POR), Carlos Peruga (ESP)

14 October 2016	Panathinaikos Superfoods (Greece)	84–76	(Lithuania) Žalgiris	Athens
20:15 (CEST)	Scoring by quarter: 20–15, 17–15, 14–22, 33–24
	Pts: Pappas 19; Rebs: Singleton 7 Asts: N. Calathes 4 PIR: Pappas 23	Boxscore	Pts: Motum 19; Rebs: Jankūnas 8 Asts: Pangos, Westermann 3 PIR: Jankūnas 23	Arena: Olympic Sports Center Athens; Attendance: 8,722; Referees: Daniel Hierrezuelo (ESP), Tolga Sahin (ITA), Amit Balak (ISR)

14 October 2016	Baskonia (Spain)	85–84	(Turkey) Anadolu Efes	Vitoria-Gasteiz
21:00 (CEST)	Scoring by quarter: 25–27, 24–24, 19–22, 17–11
	Pts: Bargnani 26; Rebs: Shengelia 9 Asts: Larkin 5 PIR: Bargnani 23	Boxscore	Pts: Brown 16; Rebs: Dunston, Granger 4 Asts: Heurtel 5 PIR: Dunston 14	Arena: Fernando Buesa Arena; Attendance: 10,126; Referees: Christos Christodoulou (GRE), Carmelo Paternicò (ITA), Miloš Koljenšić (MNE)

=== Round 2 ===
20 October 2016	Olympiacos (Greece)	90–66	(Turkey) Anadolu Efes	Piraeus
18:45 (CEST)	Scoring by quarter: 28–16, 13–17, 21–20, 28–13
	Pts: Spanoulis 17; Rebs: Birch 8 Asts: Spanoulis 9 PIR: Spanoulis 26	Boxscore	Pts: Osman 22; Rebs: Honeycutt 9 Asts: Heurtel 4 PIR: Osman 24	Arena: Peace and Friendship Stadium; Attendance: 8,262; Referees: Ilija Belošević (SRB), Emilio Pérez Pizarro (ESP), Jakub Zamojski (POL)

20 October 2016	Brose Bamberg (Germany)	89–86	(Russia) UNICS	Bamberg
20:00 (CEST)	Scoring by quarter: 19–17, 22–27, 19–23, 29–19
	Pts: Strēlnieks 17; Rebs: Melli, Miller 7 Asts: Zisis 12; PIR: Melli, Zisis 24	Boxscore	Pts: Langford 24; Rebs: three players 7 Asts: Ponkrashov 7 PIR: Clarke 24	Arena: Brose Arena; Attendance: 6,249; Referees: Daniel Hierrezuelo (ESP), Tomislav Hordov (CRO), Igor Dragojević (MNE)

20 October 2016	Maccabi Tel Aviv (Israel)	82–89	(Spain) Real Madrid	Tel Aviv
20:05 (CEST)	Scoring by quarter: 16–20, 17–26, 24–16, 25–27
	Pts: Rudd 18; Rebs: Rudd 7 Asts: Goudelock, Weems 5 PIR: Goudelock 22	Boxscore	Pts: Carroll 18; Rebs: Ayón 8 Asts: Llull 11; PIR: Ayón 16	Arena: Menora Mivtachim Arena; Attendance: 10,728; Referees: Borys Rhyzhyk (UKR), Milivoje Jovčić (SRB), Spiros Gkontas (GRE)

20 October 2016	Darüşşafaka Doğuş (Turkey)	80–81	(Italy) EA7 Emporio Armani Milan	Istanbul
20:45 (CEST)	Scoring by quarter: 23–24, 18–22, 17–14, 22–21
	Pts: Moerman 20; Rebs: Moerman 5 Asts: Wanamaker 6 PIR: Moerman 19	Boxscore	Pts: Mačvan 19; Rebs: McLean 8 Asts: Hickman 5 PIR: Mačvan 21	Arena: Volkswagen Arena; Attendance: 4,587; Referees: Christos Christodoulou (GRE), Robert Lottermosser (GER), Aare Halliko (EST)

21 October 2016	CSKA Moscow (Russia)	81–77	(Greece) Panathinaikos Superfoods	Moscow
19:00 (CEST)	Scoring by quarter: 22–19, 13–11, 22–28, 24–19
	Pts: de Colo, Vorontsevich 20; Rebs: Augustine 7 Asts: Teodosić 9 PIR: Vorontsevich 24	Boxscore	Pts: Nichols 20; Rebs: N. Calathes 9 Asts: N. Calathes 8 PIR: Nichols 22	Arena: Megasport Arena; Attendance: 9,311; Referees: Saša Pukl (SLO), Benjamín Jiménez (ESP), Piotr Pastusiak (POL)

21 October 2016	Galatasaray Odeabank (Turkey)	83–85	(Serbia) Crvena zvezda mts	Istanbul
19:00 (CEST)	Scoring by quarter: 30–17, 17–30, 20–22, 16–16
	Pts: Daye 24; Rebs: Daye 8 Asts: Güler 7 PIR: Daye, Tyus 27	Boxscore	Pts: Simonović 23; Rebs: Kuzmić 7 Asts: Jović 9 PIR: Simonović 24	Arena: Abdi İpekçi Arena; Attendance: 4,497; Referees: Fernando Rocha (POR), Ioannis Foufis (GRE), Robert Vyklický (CZE)

21 October 2016	Žalgiris (Lithuania)	78–73	(Spain) Baskonia	Kaunas
19:00 (CEST)	Scoring by quarter: 20–23, 14–17, 27–21, 17–12
	Pts: Westermann 20; Rebs: Jankūnas 9 Asts: Lekavičius 5 PIR: Westermann 24	Boxscore	Pts: Hanga 18; Rebs: Blažič 8 Asts: Larkin 6 PIR: Bargnani 19	Arena: Žalgirio Arena; Attendance: 11,277; Referees: Sreten Radović (CRO), Sašo Petek (SLO), Petri Mäntylä (FIN)

21 October 2016	FC Barcelona Lassa (Spain)	72–73	(Turkey) Fenerbahçe	Barcelona
21:00 (CEST)	Scoring by quarter: 19–21, 17–19, 15–13, 21–20
	Pts: Rice 19; Rebs: Tomić 8 Asts: Oleson, Rice 6 PIR: Rice 19	Boxscore	Pts: Dixon, Sloukas 15; Rebs: Udoh 8 Asts: Bogdanović, Sloukas 4 PIR: Udoh 15	Arena: Palau Blaugrana; Attendance: 5,827; Referees: Luigi Lamonica (ITA), Oļegs Latiševs (LAT), Miloš Koljenšić (MNE)

=== Round 3 ===
25 October 2016	UNICS (Russia)	87–94	(Turkey) Darüşşafaka Doğuş	Kazan
18:00 (CEST)	Scoring by quarter: 29–28, 18–18, 12–19, 28–29
	Pts: Langford 22; Rebs: Colom 8 Asts: Langford 4 PIR: Parakhouski 27	Boxscore	Pts: Wanamaker 22; Rebs: Anderson 6 Asts: Wanamaker 7 PIR: Wanamaker 21	Arena: Basket Hall Kazan; Attendance: 2,905; Referees: Oļegs Latiševs (LAT), Emilio Pérez Pizarro (ESP), Marko Juras (SRB)

25 October 2016	Anadolu Efes (Turkey)	87–93	(Russia) CSKA Moscow	Istanbul
20:00 (CEST)	Scoring by quarter: 23–26, 14–23, 26–20, 24–24
	Pts: Thomas 16; Rebs: Honeycutt 11; Asts: Granger 8 PIR: Brown 18	Boxscore	Pts: de Colo 26; Rebs: Hines 5 Asts: Teodosić 8 PIR: de Colo 32	Arena: Abdi İpekçi Arena; Attendance: 3,531; Referees: Luigi Lamonica (ITA), Miguel Pérez Pérez (ESP), Seffi Shemmesh (ISR)

25 October 2016	Olympiacos (Greece)	91–81	(Italy) EA7 Emporio Armani Milan	Piraeus
20:00 (CEST)	Scoring by quarter: 25–19, 21–22, 24–20, 21–20
	Pts: Green, Spanoulis 16; Rebs: Printezis 7 Asts: Spanoulis 4 PIR: Birch 16	Boxscore	Pts: Simon 16; Rebs: Raduljica 8 Asts: Gentile, Hickman 4 PIR: Raduljica 18	Arena: Peace and Friendship Stadium; Attendance: 7,584; Referees: Saša Pukl (SLO), Fernando Rocha (POR), David Romano (ISR)

25 October 2016	Real Madrid (Spain)	87–91	(Spain) Baskonia	Madrid
21:00 (CEST)	Scoring by quarter: 19–32, 24–22, 23–15, 21–22
	Pts: Ayón 16; Rebs: Randolph 13; Asts: Dončić, Fernández 4 PIR: Dončić 24	Boxscore	Pts: Blažič 21; Rebs: Voigtmann 11; Asts: Larkin 5 PIR: Voigtmann 26	Arena: Barclaycard Center; Attendance: 10,098; Referees: Damir Javor (SLO), Emin Moğulkoç (TUR), Tomislav Hordov (CRO)

26 October 2016	Crvena zvezda mts (Serbia)	76–65	(Spain) FC Barcelona Lassa	Belgrade
19:00 (CEST)	Scoring by quarter: 9–16, 31–15, 20–17, 16–17
	Pts: Gudurić 21; Rebs: Kuzmić, Simonović 5 Asts: Jenkins 7 PIR: Gudurić 30	Boxscore	Pts: Oleson 15; Rebs: Claver 10; Asts: Oleson, Rice 5 PIR: Claver, Oleson 18	Arena: Kombank Arena; Attendance: 18,150; Referees: Borys Ryzhyk (UKR), Tolga Sahin (ITA), Clemens Fritz (GER)

26 October 2016	Fenerbahçe (Turkey)	82–68	(Lithuania) Žalgiris	Istanbul
19:45 (CEST)	Scoring by quarter: 28–24, 16–13, 19–19, 19–12
	Pts: Udoh, Veselý 14; Rebs: Udoh 8 Asts: Sloukas 11; PIR: Udoh 25	Boxscore	Pts: Westermann 15; Rebs: Ulanovas 5 Asts: Westermann 4 PIR: Westermann 15	Arena: Fenerbahçe Ülker Sports Arena; Attendance: 10,869; Referees: Robert Lottermoser (GER), Carlos Cortés (ESP), Tomasz Trawicki (POL)

26 October 2016	Brose Bamberg (Germany)	82–83	(Greece) Panathinaikos Superfoods	Bamberg
20:00 (CEST)	Scoring by quarter: 15–20, 22–22, 26–20, 20–22
	Pts: Melli 17; Rebs: Theis 7 Asts: Zisis 6 PIR: Melli 19	Boxscore	Pts: Rivers 18; Rebs: Calathes 9 Asts: Calathes 9 PIR: Calathes 29	Arena: Brose Arena; Attendance: 6,249; Referees: Juan Carlos García González (ESP), Jakub Zamojski (POL), Siniša Herceg (CRO)

26 October 2016	Maccabi Tel Aviv (Israel)	98–92	(Turkey) Galatasaray Odeabank	Tel Aviv
20:05 (CEST)	Scoring by quarter: 18–24, 26–23, 25–18, 29–27
	Pts: Weems 23; Rebs: Rudd 8 Asts: Seeley 6 PIR: Iverson, Weems 24	Boxscore	Pts: Dentmon 22; Rebs: Micov 6 Asts: Shilb 6 PIR: Dentmon 25	Arena: Menora Mivtachim Arena; Attendance: 10,728; Referees: Carmelo Paternicò (ITA), Benjamín Jiménez (ESP), Sašo Petek (SLO)

=== Round 4 ===
27 October 2016	CSKA Moscow (Russia)	98–80	(Russia) UNICS	Moscow
19:00 (CEST)	Scoring by quarter: 23–20, 24–23, 21–12, 30–25
	Pts: Teodosić 16; Rebs: Vorontsevich 7 Asts: Teodosić 10; PIR: Teodosić 19	Boxscore	Pts: Langford 36; Rebs: Williams 6 Asts: Colom 5 PIR: Langford 40	Arena: Megasport Arena; Attendance: 6,859; Referees: Sreten Radović (CRO), Milija Vojinović (SRB), Jurgis Laurinavičius (LTU)

27 October 2016	Darüşşafaka Doğuş (Turkey)	79–84	(Turkey) Anadolu Efes	Istanbul
19:15 (CEST)	Scoring by quarter: 20–13, 26–22, 19–23, 14–26
	Pts: Wilbekin 13; Rebs: Moerman 9 Asts: Wanamaker 6 PIR: Wilbekin 18	Boxscore	Pts: Thomas 17; Rebs: Honeycutt 9 Asts: Heurtel 9 PIR: Honeycutt 19	Arena: Volkswagen Arena; Attendance: 4,728 (tentative); Referees: Saša Pukl (SLO), Fernando Rocha (POR), Carlos Peruga (ESP)

27 October 2016	EA7 Emporio Armani Milan (Italy)	90–101	(Spain) Real Madrid	Assago
20:00 (CEST)	Scoring by quarter: 20–26, 21–26, 25–23, 24–26
	Pts: Hickman 19; Rebs: Sanders 6 Asts: Simon 6 PIR: Hickman 24	Boxscore	Pts: Randolph 20; Rebs: Randolph 14; Asts: Llull 6 PIR: Randolph 26	Arena: Mediolanum Forum; Attendance: 12,518; Referees: Elias Koromilas (GRE), Matej Boltauzer (SLO), Petri Mäntylä (FIN)

27 October 2016	Baskonia (Spain)	90–95	(Greece) Olympiacos	Vitoria-Gasteiz
21:00 (CEST)	Scoring by quarter: 27–22, 25–25, 22–25, 16–23
	Pts: Shengelia 20; Rebs: Voigtmann 8 Asts: Larkin 11; PIR: Larkin, Shengelia 20	Boxscore	Pts: Mantzaris 17; Rebs: Birch 8 Asts: Spanoulis 15; PIR: Spanoulis 25	Arena: Fernando Buesa Arena; Attendance: 10,867; Referees: Milivoje Jovčić (SRB), Piotr Pastusiak (POL), Aare Halliko (EST)

28 October 2016	Galatasaray Odeabank (Turkey)	87–103	(Turkey) Fenerbahçe	Istanbul
19:00 (CEST)	Scoring by quarter: 19–22, 22–26, 23–22, 23–33
	Pts: Daye 16; Rebs: Tyus 8 Asts: Güler 4 PIR: Daye 17	Boxscore	Pts: Sloukas 24; Rebs: Udoh 13; Asts: Sloukas 7 PIR: Udoh 31	Arena: Abdi İpekçi Arena; Attendance: 9,251; Referees: Daniel Hierrezuelo (ESP), Borys Ryzhyk (UKR), Jakub Zamojski (POL)

28 October 2016	Žalgiris (Lithuania)	74–87	(Israel) Maccabi Tel Aviv	Kaunas
19:00 (CEST)	Scoring by quarter: 16–21, 16–22, 25–21, 17–23
	Pts: Lekavičius 16; Rebs: Lekavičius 8 Asts: Westermann 7 PIR: Lekavičius 21	Boxscore	Pts: Goudelock 18; Rebs: Iverson 5 Asts: Mekel 3 PIR: Smith 19	Arena: Žalgirio Arena; Attendance: 12,608; Referees: Christos Christodoulou (GRE), Joseph Bissang (FRA), Torkild Rødsand (NOR)

28 October 2016	Panathinaikos Superfoods (Greece)	70–59	(Serbia) Crvena zvezda mts	Athens
20:15 (CEST)	Scoring by quarter: 23–14, 23–11, 15–16, 9–18
	Pts: Gist 17; Rebs: Bourousis 8 Asts: Calathes 5 PIR: Bourousis 18	Boxscore	Pts: Kuzmić 15; Rebs: Kuzmić 15; Asts: Wolters 3 PIR: Kuzmić 27	Arena: Olympic Sports Center Athens; Attendance: 9,669; Referees: Luigi Lamonica (ITA), Oļegs Latiševs (LAT), Sašo Petek (SLO)

28 October 2016	FC Barcelona Lassa (Spain)	78–74	(Germany) Brose Bamberg	Barcelona
21:00 (CEST)	Scoring by quarter: 19–19, 21–19, 19–19, 19–17
	Pts: Rice 18; Rebs: Dorsey 9 Asts: Perperoglou, Rice 6 PIR: Perperoglou 20	Boxscore	Pts: Causeur, Theis 19; Rebs: Melli 6 Asts: Zisis 6 PIR: Causeur 22	Arena: Palau Blaugrana; Attendance: 5,074; Referees: Ilija Belošević (SRB), Damir Javor (SLO), Amit Balak (ISR)

=== Round 5 ===
2 November 2016	Fenerbahçe (Turkey)	73–81	(Russia) UNICS	Istanbul
18:00 (CET)	Scoring by quarter: 15–20, 24–23, 23–20, 11–18
	Pts: Dixon 23; Rebs: Datome 8 Asts: Dixon, Sloukas 5 PIR: Dixon 23	Boxscore	Pts: Langford 28; Rebs: Parakhouski 12; Asts: Colom 11; PIR: Langford 36	Arena: Fenerbahçe Ülker Sports Arena; Attendance: 10,347 (tentative); Referees: Juan Carlos García González (ESP), Elias Koromilas (GRE), Siniša Herceg (CRO)

2 November 2016	Maccabi Tel Aviv (Israel)	69–79	(Spain) FC Barcelona Lassa	Tel Aviv
18:45 (CET)	Scoring by quarter: 18–20, 16–20, 13–18, 22–21
	Pts: Goudelock 19; Rebs: Smith 6 Asts: Seeley, Weems 4 PIR: Goudelock, Smith 19	Boxscore	Pts: Rice 21; Rebs: Dorsey 11; Asts: Dorsey 4 PIR: Dorsey 23	Arena: Menora Mivtachim Arena; Attendance: 10,728 (tentative); Referees: Robert Lottermoser (GER), Fernando Rocha (POR), Matej Boltauzer (SLO)

3 November 2016	Olympiacos (Greece)	75–81	(Russia) CSKA Moscow	Piraeus
20:00 (CET)	Scoring by quarter: 21–25, 7–19, 23–22, 24–15
	Pts: Printezis 26; Rebs: Papanikolaou 8 Asts: Spanoulis5; PIR: Printezis 27	Boxscore	Pts: de Colo 23; Rebs: de Colo 9 Asts: Jackson, Teodosić 5 PIR: de Colo 24	Arena: Peace and Friendship Stadium; Attendance: 10,000 (tentative); Referees: Daniel Hierrezuelo (ESP), Damir Javor (SLO), Emin Moğulkoç (TUR)

3 November 2016	Brose Bamberg (Germany)	106–102(OT)	(Italy) EA7 Emporio Armani Milan	Bamberg
20:00 (CET)	Scoring by quarter: 18–21, 20–25, 23–18, 30–27, Overtime: 15–11
	Pts: Miller 27; Rebs: Melli 9 Asts: Strēlnieks 6 PIR: Miller 20	Boxscore	Pts: Sanders 25; Rebs: McLean 9 Asts: Gentile 5 PIR: Sanders 31	Arena: Brose Arena; Attendance: 6,249 (tentative); Referees: Miguel Pérez Pérez (ESP), Milivoje Jovčić (SRB), Mario Majkić (SLO)

3 November 2016	Real Madrid (Spain)	90–81	(Turkey) Galatasaray Odeabank	Madrid
20:00 (CET)	Scoring by quarter: 19–22, 26–25, 21–17, 24–17
	Pts: Llull 23; Rebs: Randolph 10; Asts: Fernández 6 PIR: Llull 23	Boxscore	Pts: Micov 17; Rebs: Tyus 8 Asts: Güler 5 PIR: Tyus 16	Arena: Barclaycard Center; Attendance: 8,914 (tentative); Referees: Saša Pukl (SLO), Ilija Belošević (SRB), Jurgis Laurinavičius (LTU)

4 November 2016	Žalgiris (Lithuania)	80–83	(Turkey) Darüşşafaka Doğuş	Kaunas
18:00 (CET)	Scoring by quarter: 25–15, 10–11, 21–35, 24–22
	Pts: Jankūnas, Westermann 21; Rebs: Jankūnas 11; Asts: Westermann 6 PIR: Jankūnas 36	Boxscore	Pts: Moerman 16; Rebs: Clyburn, Moerman 5 Asts: Moerman 4 PIR: Moerman 20	Arena: Žalgirio Arena; Attendance: 9,241 (tentative); Referees: Luigi Lamonica (ITA), Benjamín Jiménez (ESP), Renaud Geller (BEL)

4 November 2016	Anadolu Efes (Turkey)	91–83(OT)	(Greece) Panathinaikos Superfoods	Istanbul
18:45 (CET)	Scoring by quarter: 16–20, 19–22, 18–11, 17–17, Overtime: 7–7
	Pts: Heurtel 17; Rebs: Honeycutt 13; Asts: Heurtel 5 PIR: Honeycutt 28	Boxscore	Pts: Rivers 15; Rebs: Gist 11; Asts: Calathes 12; PIR: Calathes 20	Arena: Abdi İpekçi Arena; Attendance: 4,639 (tentative); Referees: Borys Rhyzhyk (UKR), Joseph Bissang (FRA), David Romano (ISR)

4 November 2016	Crvena zvezda mts (Serbia)	63–70	(Spain) Baskonia	Belgrade
19:00 (CET)	Scoring by quarter: 15–22, 13–15, 20–22, 15–11
	Pts: Gudurić 12; Rebs: Jenkins 8 Asts: Gudurić 4 PIR: Bjelica, Gudurić 14	Boxscore	Pts: Beaubois, Larkin 16; Rebs: Voigtmann 8 Asts: Larkin 6 PIR: Larkin 18	Arena: Kombank Arena; Attendance: 16,578 (tentative); Referees: Jakub Zamojski (POL), Petros Papapetrou (GRE), Amit Balak (ISR)

=== Round 6 ===
10 November 2016	UNICS (Russia)	65–62	(Serbia) Crvena zvezda mts	Kazan
17:00 (CET)	Scoring by quarter: 17–17, 10–15, 14–11, 24–19
	Pts: Langford 23; Rebs: Williams 9 Asts: Colom 5 PIR: Langford 26	Boxscore	Pts: Wolters 11; Rebs: Kuzmić 7 Asts: Jović 4 PIR: Kuzmić 17	Arena: Basket Hall Kazan; Attendance: 3,001; Referees: Matej Boltauzer (SLO), Robert Lottermoser (GER), Ersan Kartal (TUR)

10 November 2016	Darüşşafaka Doğuş (Turkey)	72–70	(Germany) Brose Bamberg	Istanbul
18:00 (CET)	Scoring by quarter: 23–17, 17–23, 20–10, 12–20
	Pts: Clyburn 17; Rebs: Moerman 9 Asts: Wanamaker 5 PIR: Clyburn 19	Boxscore	Pts: Strēlnieks 14; Rebs: Melli 10; Asts: Melli, Strēlnieks 4 PIR: Melli 15	Arena: Volkswagen Arena; Attendance: 4,587; Referees: Borys Ryzhyk (UKR), Spiros Gkontas (GRE), Carlos Cortés (ESP)

10 November 2016	Panathinaikos Superfoods (Greece)	83–75(OT)	(Israel) Maccabi Tel Aviv	Athens
20:15 (CET)	Scoring by quarter: 18–12, 17–16, 17–15, 15–24, Overtime: 16–8
	Pts: Singleton 26; Rebs: Gist, Nichols 8 Asts: Calathes 6 PIR: Singleton 34	Boxscore	Pts: Weems 15; Rebs: Smith 12; Asts: Weems 5 PIR: Smith 17	Arena: Olympic Sports Center Athens; Attendance: 8,330; Referees: Juan Carlos García González (ESP), Emin Moğulkoç (TUR), Tomislav Hordov (CRO)

10 November 2016	EA7 Emporio Armani Milan (Italy)	105–92	(Turkey) Anadolu Efes	Assago
20:45 (CET)	Scoring by quarter: 25–24, 30–25, 24–18, 26–25
	Pts: Sanders 22; Rebs: Simon 9 Asts: Simon 8 PIR: Simon 29	Boxscore	Pts: Heurtel 18; Rebs: Dunston 8 Asts: Heurtel 7 PIR: Dunston 23	Arena: Mediolanum Forum; Attendance: 10,106; Referees: Damir Javor (SLO), Ioannis Foufis (GRE), Milija Vojinović (SRB)

10 November 2016	FC Barcelona Lassa (Spain)	92–86	(Lithuania) Žalgiris	Barcelona
21:00 (CET)	Scoring by quarter: 16–12, 20–23, 29–24, 27–27
	Pts: Rice 20; Rebs: Dorsey 10; Asts: Oleson 6 PIR: Rice 23	Boxscore	Pts: Motum 26; Rebs: Lima 8 Asts: Lima, Westermann 6 PIR: Motum 26	Arena: Palau Blaugrana; Attendance: 5,812; Referees: Sreten Radović (CRO), Milivoje Jovčić (SRB), Anne Panther (GER)

11 November 2016	Galatasaray Odeabank (Turkey)	89–87	(Greece) Olympiacos	Istanbul
18:00 (CET)	Scoring by quarter: 14–20, 24–14, 25–23, 26–30
	Pts: Dentmon 22; Rebs: Tyus 8 Asts: Güler 12; PIR: Dentmon 22	Boxscore	Pts: Mantzaris 19; Rebs: Birch 11; Asts: Spanoulis 8 PIR: Mantzaris 25	Arena: Abdi İpekçi Arena; Attendance: 4,291; Referees: Miguel Pérez Pérez (ESP), Fernando Rocha (POR), Petri Mäntylä (FIN)

11 November 2016	CSKA Moscow (Russia)	91–90	(Spain) Real Madrid	Moscow
18:30 (CET)	Scoring by quarter: 17–26, 32–12, 24–30, 18–22
	Pts: de Colo 28; Rebs: Kurbanov 8 Asts: Teodosić 6 PIR: de Colo 35	Boxscore	Pts: Llull 21; Rebs: Dončić 8 Asts: Llull 7 PIR: Llull 21	Arena: Megasport Arena; Attendance: 12,017; Referees: Robert Lottermoser (GER), Oļegs Latiševs (LAT), Piotr Pastusiak (POL)

11 November 2016	Baskonia (Spain)	86–52	(Turkey) Fenerbahçe	Vitoria-Gasteiz
21:00 (CET)	Scoring by quarter: 14–11, 27–13, 26–16, 19–12
	Pts: three players 13; Rebs: Voigtmann 13; Asts: Larkin, Luz 6 PIR: Voigtmann 22	Boxscore	Pts: Sloukas 9 Rebs: Udoh 7 Asts: Kalinić 3 PIR: Udoh 12	Arena: Fernando Buesa Arena; Attendance: 14,128; Referees: Christos Christodoulou (GRE), Saša Pukl (SLO), Carmelo Paternicò (ITA)

=== Round 7 ===
15 November 2016	Anadolu Efes (Turkey)	104–99	(Russia) UNICS	Istanbul
18:00 (CET)	Scoring by quarter: 24–26, 25–28, 32–20, 23–25
	Pts: Heurtel 24; Rebs: Dunston 9 Asts: Granger, Heurtel 8 PIR: Heurtel 26	Boxscore	Pts: Langford 25; Rebs: Parakhouski 10; Asts: Langford 9 PIR: Parakhouski 34	Arena: Abdi İpekçi Arena; Attendance: 3,471; Referees: Daniel Hierrezuelo (ESP), Carmelo Paternicò (ITA), Clemens Fritz (GER)

15 November 2016	Brose Bamberg (Germany)	78–79	(Serbia) Crvena zvezda mts	Bamberg
20:00 (CET)	Scoring by quarter: 14–11, 15–27, 32–20, 17–21
	Pts: Melli 16; Rebs: Melli 10; Asts: Zisis 9 PIR: Melli 24	Boxscore	Pts: Bjelica 18; Rebs: Kuzmić 7 Asts: Jović 5 PIR: Bjelica 22	Arena: Brose Arena; Attendance: 6,249; Referees: Christos Christodoulou (GRE), Emin Moğulkoç (TUR), Sérgio Silva (POR)

15 November 2016	Maccabi Tel Aviv (Israel)	87–77	(Turkey) Fenerbahçe	Tel Aviv
20:05 (CET)	Scoring by quarter: 15–17, 28–22, 23–21, 21–17
	Pts: Weems 22; Rebs: Rudd 5 Asts: Ohayon, Smith 6 PIR: Ohayon 25	Boxscore	Pts: Udoh 17; Rebs: Udoh, Veselý 8 Asts: Sloukas 8 PIR: Veselý 26	Arena: Menora Mivtachim Arena; Attendance: 10,728; Referees: Miguel Pérez Pérez (ESP), Damir Javor (SLO), Ioannis Foufis (GRE)

15 November 2016	EA7 Emporio Armani Milan (Italy)	88–76	(Spain) Baskonia	Desio
20:45 (CET)	Scoring by quarter: 27–17, 22–18, 23–21, 16–20
	Pts: Sanders 19; Rebs: McLean 5 Asts: Hickman 3 PIR: Sanders 16	Boxscore	Pts: Larkin 21; Rebs: Voigtmann 6 Asts: Larkin 9 PIR: Larkin 36	Arena: PalaBancoDesio; Attendance: 6,416; Referees: Borys Rhyzhyk (UKR), Robert Lottermoser (GER), Elias Koromilas (GRE)

16 November 2016	Darüşşafaka Doğuş (Turkey)	91–83	(Russia) CSKA Moscow	Istanbul
18:15 (CET)	Scoring by quarter: 30–18, 19–19, 24–20, 18–26
	Pts: Anderson 20; Rebs: Clyburn 6 Asts: Wanamaker 7 PIR: Wanamaker 26	Boxscore	Pts: de Colo, Higgins 17; Rebs: Hines 9 Asts: Teodosić 10; PIR: de Colo 23	Arena: Volkswagen Arena; Attendance: 4,835; Referees: Ilija Belošević (SRB), Sašo Petek (SLO), Miloš Koljenšić (MNE)

16 November 2016	Olympiacos (Greece)	59–52	(Spain) FC Barcelona Lassa	Piraeus
19:00 (CET)	Scoring by quarter: 21–16, 11–9, 17–13, 10–14
	Pts: Spanoulis 15; Rebs: Birch 7 Asts: Spanoulis 6 PIR: Spanoulis 17	Boxscore	Pts: Holmes 13; Rebs: Holmes 9 Asts: Koponen 4 PIR: Holmes 19	Arena: Peace and Friendship Stadium; Attendance: 10,875; Referees: Luigi Lamonica (ITA), Oļegs Latiševs (LAT), Tomislav Hordov (CRO)

16 November 2016	Žalgiris (Lithuania)	87–75	(Turkey) Galatasaray Odeabank	Kaunas
19:00 (CET)	Scoring by quarter: 20–20, 29–17, 20–14, 18–24
	Pts: Motum 24; Rebs: Jankūnas, Westermann 7 Asts: Pangos 8 PIR: Westermann 25	Boxscore	Pts: Güler 15; Rebs: Tyus 6 Asts: Güler 4 PIR: Preldžić, Schilb 14	Arena: Žalgirio Arena; Attendance: 8,621; Referees: Matej Boltauzer (SLO), Marcin Kowalski (POL), Ingus Baumanis (LAT)

16 November 2016	Real Madrid (Spain)	87–84	(Greece) Panathinaikos Superfoods	Madrid
21:00 (CET)	Scoring by quarter: 21–23, 32–27, 19–18, 15–16
	Pts: Llull 30; Rebs: Ayón 6 Asts: Ayón 5 PIR: Llull 27	Boxscore	Pts: Feldeine 19; Rebs: Bourousis 9 Asts: N. Calathes 9 PIR: N. Calathes 24	Arena: Barclaycard Center; Attendance: 10,489; Referees: Sreten Radovoć (CRO), Milivoje Jovčić (SRB), Jakub Zamojski (POL)

=== Round 8 ===
17 November 2016	UNICS (Russia)	73–74	(Israel) Maccabi Tel Aviv	Kazan
17:00 (CET)	Scoring by quarter: 17–25, 21–16, 16–20, 19–13
	Pts: Langford 22; Rebs: Kaimakoglou 5 Asts: Colom 4 PIR: Langford 20	Boxscore	Pts: Smith 16; Rebs: Iverson, Smith 6 Asts: Weems 7 PIR: Smith 15	Arena: Basket Hall Kazan; Attendance: 3,028; Referees: Spiros Gkontas (GRE), Carlos Peruga (ESP), Mario Majkić (SLO)

17 November 2016	Fenerbahçe (Turkey)	88–80	(Turkey) Anadolu Efes	Istanbul
18:45 (CET)	Scoring by quarter: 17–25, 26–17, 21–19, 24–19
	Pts: Sloukas 21; Rebs: Datome, Udoh 7 Asts: Sloukas 4 PIR: Sloukas 25	Boxscore	Pts: Granger 19; Rebs: Brown 10; Asts: Brown 7 PIR: Brown 21	Arena: Fenerbahçe Ülker Sports Arena; Attendance: 10,057; Referees: Juan Carlos García González (ESP), Elias Koromilas (GRE), Amit Balak (ISR)

17 November 2016	Crvena zvezda mts (Serbia)	83–70	(Italy) EA7 Emporio Armani Milan	Belgrade
19:00 (CET)	Scoring by quarter: 14–19, 23–13, 17–14, 29–24
	Pts: Simonović 23; Rebs: Bjelica, Kuzmić 7 Asts: Wolters 6 PIR: Simonović 22	Boxscore	Pts: Gentile 14; Rebs: Raduljica 6 Asts: Kalnietis 4 PIR: Gentile, Simon 12	Arena: Kombank Arena; Attendance: 10,279; Referees: Fernando Rocha (POR), Daniel Hierrezuelo (ESP), Anne Panther (GER)

17 November 2016	Baskonia (Spain)	81–74	(Germany) Brose Bamberg	Vitoria-Gasteiz
20:30 (CET)	Scoring by quarter: 16–23, 16–24, 23–16, 26–11
	Pts: Beaubois, Voigtmann 20; Rebs: Voigtmann 9 Asts: Larkin 6 PIR: Voigtmann 25	Boxscore	Pts: Miller 16; Rebs: Melli 12; Asts: Zisis 5 PIR: Melli 18	Arena: Fernando Buesa Arena; Attendance: 9,437; Referees: Sreten Radović (CRO), Damir Javor (SLO), Aare Halliko (EST)

18 November 2016	CSKA Moscow (Russia)	95–86	(Lithuania) Žalgiris	Moscow
18:00 (CET)	Scoring by quarter: 19–21, 21–20, 27–28, 28–17
	Pts: Teodosić 25; Rebs: Ayres 7 Asts: Higgins 6 PIR: Ayres 26	Boxscore	Pts: Jankūnas 30; Rebs: Jankūnas 8 Asts: Westermann 7 PIR: Jankūnas 37	Arena: Megasport Arena; Attendance: 6,511; Referees: Emilio Pérez Pizarro (ESP), Igor Dragojević (MNE), Tomasz Trawicki (POL)

18 November 2016	Galatasaray Odeabank (Turkey)	85–81	(Turkey) Darüşşafaka Doğuş	Istanbul
18:00 (CET)	Scoring by quarter: 17–21, 20–17, 28–17, 20–26
	Pts: Pleiß 22; Rebs: Pleiß 8 Asts: Micov, Preldžić 6 PIR: Pleiß 28	Boxscore	Pts: Clyburn 20; Rebs: Anderson, Slaughter 7 Asts: Wanamaker 5 PIR: Clyburn 16	Arena: Abdi İpekçi Arena; Attendance: 3,003; Referees: Luigi Lamonica (ITA), Siniša Herceg (CRO), Petros Papapetrou (GRE)

18 November 2016	Panathinaikos Superfoods (Greece)	77–79	(Greece) Olympiacos	Athens
20:15 (CET)	Scoring by quarter: 23–23, 16–24, 24–14, 14–18
	Pts: N. Calathes 16; Rebs: Singleton 9 Asts: N. Calathes 9 PIR: N. Calathes, Singleton 22	Boxscore	Pts: Spanoulis 22; Rebs: Birch 6 Asts: Spanoulis 8 PIR: Spanoulis 24	Arena: Olympic Sports Center Athens; Attendance: 16,993; Referees: Saša Pukl (SLO), Robert Lottermoser (GER), Benjamín Jiménez (ESP)

18 November 2016	FC Barcelona Lassa (Spain)	63–102	(Spain) Real Madrid	Barcelona
21:00 (CET)	Scoring by quarter: 17–29, 14–25, 15–21, 17–27
	Pts: Rice 23; Rebs: Vezenkov 10; Asts: Rice 5 PIR: Rice 23	Boxscore	Pts: Llull 20; Rebs: Randolph 11; Asts: Llull 7 PIR: Randolph 25	Arena: Palau Blaugrana; Attendance: 7,013; Referees: Borys Rhyzhyk (UKR), Carmelo Paternicò (ITA), Matej Boltauzer (SLO)

=== Round 9 ===
24 November 2016	Anadolu Efes (Turkey)	100–79	(Serbia) Crvena zvezda mts	Istanbul
18:00 (CET)	Scoring by quarter: 21–21, 26–19, 27–24, 26–15
	Pts: Brown 20; Rebs: Honeycutt 13; Asts: Heurtel 7 PIR: Brown 38	Boxscore	Pts: Jenkins 20; Rebs: Kuzmić 6 Asts: Jović 7 PIR: Jenkins 21	Arena: Abdi İpekçi Arena; Attendance: 3,281; Referees: Emilio Pérez Pizarro (ESP), Ioannis Foufis (GRE), Moritz Reiter (GER)

24 November 2016	Olympiacos (Greece)	73–80	(Israel) Maccabi Tel Aviv	Piraeus
18:45 (CET)	Scoring by quarter: 20–24, 17–20, 12–21, 24–15
	Pts: Lojeski 15; Rebs: Birch 8 Asts: Spanoulis 4 PIR: Birch 20	Boxscore	Pts: Seeley 19; Rebs: Smith 10; Asts: Weems 6 PIR: Iverson 23	Arena: Peace and Friendship Stadium; Attendance: 9,104; Referees: Borys Rhyzhyk (UKR), Milivoje Jovčić (SRB), Carmelo Paternicò (ITA)

24 November 2016	Žalgiris (Lithuania)	86–72	(Germany) Brose Bamberg	Kaunas
19:00 (CET)	Scoring by quarter: 18–22, 29–17, 24–16, 15–17
	Pts: Jankūnas 23; Rebs: Jankūnas 9 Asts: Pangos 6 PIR: Jankūnas 25	Boxscore	Pts: Theis 15; Rebs: Melli 4 Asts: Miller 5 PIR: Theis 19	Arena: Žalgirio Arena; Attendance: 8,726; Referees: Daniel Hierrezuelo (ESP), Ilija Belošević (SRB), Igor Mitrovski (MKD)

24 November 2016	EA7 Emporio Armani Milan (Italy)	70–79	(Turkey) Fenerbahçe	Assago
20:45 (CET)	Scoring by quarter: 17–21, 19–23, 27–14, 7–21
	Pts: Sanders 17; Rebs: McLean 8 Asts: Kalnietis 6 PIR: McLean 22	Boxscore	Pts: Sloukas 18; Rebs: Sloukas 7 Asts: Sloukas 4 PIR: Sloukas 25	Arena: Mediolanum Forum; Attendance: 12,046; Referees: Benjamín Jiménez (ESP), Oļegs Latiševs (LAT), Jakub Zamojski (POL)

24 November 2016	Real Madrid (Spain)	89–75	(Russia) UNICS	Madrid
21:00 (CET)	Scoring by quarter: 25–17, 15–20, 22–18, 27–20
	Pts: Reyes 16; Rebs: Fernández 7 Asts: Llull 7 PIR: Reyes 24	Boxscore	Pts: Parakhouski 19; Rebs: Langford, Parakhouski 7 Asts: Langford 5 PIR: Parakhouski 21	Arena: Barclaycard Center; Attendance: 8,620; Referees: Christos Christodoulou (GRE), Emin Moğulkoç (TUR), Uroš Obrknežević (SRB)

25 November 2016	CSKA Moscow (Russia)	112–84	(Spain) Baskonia	Moscow
18:00 (CET)	Scoring by quarter: 17–27, 32–19, 34–23, 29–15
	Pts: Teodosić 34; Rebs: Augustine, Kurbanov 10; Asts: Teodosić 10; PIR: Teodosić 43	Boxscore	Pts: Beaubois 19; Rebs: Voigtmann 9 Asts: Voigtmann 9 PIR: Voigtmann 19	Arena: Megasport Arena; Attendance: 6,823; Referees: Luigi Lamonica (ITA), Matej Boltauzer (SLO), Seffi Shemmesh (ISR)

25 November 2016	Galatasaray Odeabank (Turkey)	78–64	(Spain) FC Barcelona Lassa	Istanbul
18:00 (CET)	Scoring by quarter: 17–16, 22–19, 22–13, 17–16
	Pts: Schilb, Güler 18; Rebs: Pleiß 11; Asts: Güler 7 PIR: Schilb 30	Boxscore	Pts: Rice 22; Rebs: Dorsey 10; Asts: Rice 4 PIR: Rice 16	Arena: Abdi İpekçi Arena; Attendance: 10,433; Referees: Sreten Radović (CRO), Robert Lottermoser (GER), Petri Mäntylä (FIN)

25 November 2016	Panathinaikos Superfoods (Greece)	86–80	(Turkey) Darüşşafaka Doğuş	Athens
20:45 (CET)	Scoring by quarter: 21–16, 25–18, 18–26, 22–20
	Pts: Bourousis 18; Rebs: N. Calathes 7 Asts: N. Calathes 5 PIR: Bourousis 28	Boxscore	Pts: Clyburn 26; Rebs: Clyburn 9 Asts: Wilbekin 7 PIR: Clyburn 26	Arena: Olympic Sports Center Athens; Attendance: 7,347; Referees: Damir Javor (SLO), Fernando Rocha (POR), Piotr Pastusiak (POL)

=== Round 10 ===
1 December 2016	UNICS (Russia)	100–79	(Italy) EA7 Emporio Armani Milan	Kazan
17:00 (CET)	Scoring by quarter: 35–24, 22–19, 16–26, 27–10
	Pts: Langford 25; Rebs: Colom 6 Asts: Colom 12; PIR: Langford 29	Boxscore	Pts: McLean 16; Rebs: Dragić 5 Asts: three players 3 PIR: Hickman 15	Arena: Basket Hall Kazan; Attendance: 1,746; Referees: Elias Koromilas (GRE), Carlos Cortés (ESP), Rain Peerandi (EST)

1 December 2016	Fenerbahçe (Turkey)	78–77	(Spain) Real Madrid	Istanbul
18:45 (CET)	Scoring by quarter: 23–19, 16–21, 18–17, 21–20
	Pts: Nunnally 18; Rebs: Udoh 10; Asts: Dixon, Sloukas 6 PIR: Nunnally, Udoh 22	Boxscore	Pts: Randolph 16; Rebs: Hunter 7 Asts: Fernández 9 PIR: Randolph 18	Arena: Fenerbahçe Ülker Sports Arena; Attendance: 12,576; Referees: Sreten Radović (CRO), Robert Lottermoser (GER), Piotr Pastusiak (POL)

1 December 2016	Brose Bamberg (Germany)	88–90	(Russia) CSKA Moscow	Bamberg
20:00 (CET)	Scoring by quarter: 16–17, 14–24, 28–20, 30–29
	Pts: Melli 26; Rebs: Theis 9 Asts: Miller, Zisis 7 PIR: Melli 37	Boxscore	Pts: Teodosić 31; Rebs: Augustine 7 Asts: Teodosić 8 PIR: Teodosić 26	Arena: Brose Arena; Attendance: 6,030; Referees: Miguel Pérez Pérez (ESP), Fernando Rocha (POR), Emin Moğulkoç (TUR)

1 December 2016	Maccabi Tel Aviv (Israel)	77–86	(Turkey) Anadolu Efes	Tel Aviv
20:05 (CET)	Scoring by quarter: 20–21, 20–26, 23–16, 14–23
	Pts: Smith, Zirbes 13; Rebs: Smith 6 Asts: Goudelock 7 PIR: Goudelock 15	Boxscore	Pts: Brown 22; Rebs: Brown 12; Asts: Granger 7 PIR: Brown 38	Arena: Menora Mivtachim Arena; Attendance: 10,728; Referees: Ilija Belošević (SRB), Jakub Zamojski (POL), Petros Papapetrou (GRE)

2 December 2016	Darüşşafaka Doğuş (Turkey)	71–77	(Greece) Olympiacos	Istanbul
20:05 (CET)	Scoring by quarter: 21– 24, 13–19, 17–14, 20–20
	Pts: Clyburn 21; Rebs: Moerman 8 Asts: Wilbekin 6 PIR: Clyburn 22	Boxscore	Pts: Lojeski, Printezis 15; Rebs: Lojeski 7 Asts: Spanoulis 5 PIR: Lojeski 23	Arena: Volkswagen Arena; Attendance: 4,941; Referees: Daniel Hierrezuelo (ESP), Milija Vojinović (SRB), Sašo Petek (SLO)

2 December 2016	Crvena zvezda mts (Serbia)	79–88	(Lithuania) Žalgiris	Belgrade
19:00 (CET)	Scoring by quarter: 16–24, 28–18, 22–24, 13–22
	Pts: Bjelica 19; Rebs: Bjelica 5 Asts: Jović, Wolters 5 PIR: Bjelica, Wolters 23	Boxscore	Pts: Kavaliauskas 20; Rebs: Lima, Westermann 7 Asts: Westermann 8 PIR: Kavaliauskas 24	Arena: Aleksandar Nikolić; Attendance: 6,453; Referees: Carmelo Paternicò (ITA), Carlos Peruga (ESP), Amit Balak (ISR)

2 December 2016	FC Barcelona Lassa (Spain)	72–57	(Greece) Panathinaikos Superfoods	Barcelona
21:00 (CET)	Scoring by quarter: 19–19, 17–12, 21–9, 15–17
	Pts: Tomić 16; Rebs: Claver, Tomić 6 Asts: Doellman, Rice 4 PIR: Tomić 18	Boxscore	Pts: N. Calathes, Feldeine 13; Rebs: Nichols 7 Asts: Feldeine 4 PIR: Singleton 17	Arena: Palau Blaugrana; Attendance: 6,296; Referees: Luigi Lamonica (ITA), Milivoje Jovčić (SRB), Tomislav Hordov (CRO)

2 December 2016	Baskonia (Spain)	69–62	(Turkey) Galatasaray Odeabank	Vitoria-Gasteiz
21:00 (CET)	Scoring by quarter: 22–9, 14–23, 18–16, 15–14
	Pts: Beaubois, Voigtmann 13; Rebs: Tillie 11; Asts: Larkin 9 PIR: Voigtmann 18	Boxscore	Pts: Pleiß, Schilb 16; Rebs: Pleiß 11; Asts: Güler, Schilb 4 PIR: Pleiß 24	Arena: Fernando Buesa Arena; Attendance: 10,678; Referees: Borys Ryzhyk (UKR), Oļegs Latiševs (LAT), Spiros Gkontas (GRE)

=== Round 11 ===
7 December 2016	Maccabi Tel Aviv (Israel)	70–85	(Germany) Brose Bamberg	Tel Aviv
18:45 (CET)	Scoring by quarter: 16–20, 14–26, 22–16, 18–23
	Pts: Goudelock 20; Rebs: Iverson 6 Asts: three players 3 PIR: Goudelock 21	Boxscore	Pts: Melli 27; Rebs: Melli 14; Asts: Zisis 9 PIR: Melli 40	Arena: Menora Mivtachim Arena; Attendance: 10,728; Referees: Saša Pukl (SLO), Elias Koromilas (GRE), Sérgio Silva (POR)

8 December 2016	Fenerbahçe (Turkey)	87–72	(Serbia) Crvena zvezda mts	Istanbul
18:45 (CET)	Scoring by quarter: 20–18, 21–13, 27–19, 19–22
	Pts: Udoh 15; Rebs: Udoh 9 Asts: Sloukas 9 PIR: Udoh 34	Boxscore	Pts: Simonović 14; Rebs: Kuzmić 10; Asts: Wolters 4 PIR: Simonović 14	Arena: Fenerbahçe Ülker Sports Arena; Attendance: 9,017; Referees: Miguel Perez Perez (ESP), Fernando Rocha (POR), Tomazs Trawicki (POL)

8 December 2016	EA7 Emporio Armani Milan (Italy)	64–79	(Russia) CSKA Moscow	Assago
20:00 (CET)	Scoring by quarter: 23–21, 15–15, 16–30, 10–13
	Pts: Raduljica 11; Rebs: Dragić, McLean 6 Asts: Mačvan 3 PIR: Hickman 16	Boxscore	Pts: Jackson, Kulagin 14; Rebs: Kurbanov 7 Asts: Jackson 5 PIR: Jackson 19	Arena: Mediolanum Forum; Attendance: 12,788; Referees: Daniel Hierrezuelo (ESP), Milivoje Jovčić (SRB), Mario Majkić (SLO)

8 December 2016	Real Madrid (Spain)	96–91	(Lithuania) Žalgiris	Madrid
21:00 (CET)	Scoring by quarter: 25–22, 24–27, 25–20, 22–22
	Pts: Dončić 17; Rebs: Ayón 7 Asts: Fernández 7 PIR: Dončić 24	Boxscore	Pts: Pangos 19; Rebs: Ulanovas, Westermann 6 Asts: Pangos, Westermann 4 PIR: Ulanovas 19	Arena: Barclaycard Center; Attendance: 10,436; Referees: Luigi Lamonica (ITA), Oļegs Latiševs (LAT), Clemens Fritz (GER)

9 December 2016	Anadolu Efes (Turkey)	72–68	(Spain) FC Barcelona Lassa	Istanbul
18:00 (CET)	Scoring by quarter: 21–15, 15–13, 18–17, 18–23
	Pts: Granger 16; Rebs: Honeycutt 9 Asts: Granger 5 PIR: Brown 18	Boxscore	Pts: Rice 22; Rebs: Claver 8 Asts: Rice 7 PIR: Rice 19	Arena: Abdi İpekçi Arena; Attendance: 8,644; Referees: Borys Ryzhyk (UKR), Damir Javor (SLO), Aare Halliko (EST)

9 December 2016	Panathinaikos Superfoods (Greece)	85–58	(Turkey) Galatasaray Odeabank	Athens
19:00 (CET)	Scoring by quarter: 20–13, 19–18, 25–14, 21–13
	Pts: three players 14; Rebs: Bourousis 8 Asts: N. Calathes; PIR: Singleton 25	Boxscore	Pts: Schilb 15; Rebs: Thompson 8 Asts: four players 2 PIR: Thompson 11	Arena: Olympic Sports Center Athens; Attendance: 6,139; Referees: Carmelo Paternicò (ITA), Jakub Zamojski (POL), Sašo Petek (SLO)

9 December 2016	Olympiacos (Greece)	88–59	(Russia) UNICS	Piraeus
20:45 (CET)	Scoring by quarter: 24–16, 19–12, 25–14, 20–17
	Pts: Green, Lojeski 15; Rebs: Lojeski 6 Asts: Spanoulis 4 PIR: Lojeski 22	Boxscore	Pts: Langford 25; Rebs: Kaimakoglou 5 Asts: Stoll 7 PIR: Langford 15	Arena: Peace and Friendship Stadium; Attendance: 7,176; Referees: Juan Carlos García González (ESP), Matej Boltauzer (SLO), Benjamín Jiménez (ESP)

9 December 2016	Baskonia (Spain)	73–52	(Turkey) Darüşşafaka Doğuş	Vitoria-Gasteiz
21:00 (CET)	Scoring by quarter: 18–9, 19–10, 18–14, 18–19
	Pts: Larkin 14; Rebs: Tillie, Voigtmann 9 Asts: Larkin 5 PIR: Hanga 17	Boxscore	Pts: Anderson 11; Rebs: Moerman 9 Asts: Wilbekin 3 PIR: Wilbekin 10	Arena: Fernando Buesa Arena; Attendance: 10,437; Referees: Christos Christodoulou (GRE), Ilija Belošević (SRB), Petri Mäntylä (FIN)

=== Round 12 ===
15 December 2016	UNICS (Russia)	91–92	(Spain) Baskonia	Kazan
17:00 (CET)	Scoring by quarter: 20–22, 20–21, 27–24, 24–25
	Pts: Langford 28; Rebs: Williams 6 Asts: Colom 6 PIR: Langford 26	Boxscore	Pts: Larkin 22; Rebs: Budinger 6 Asts: Larkin 6 PIR: Larkin 26	Arena: Basket Hall Kazan; Attendance: 3,246; Referees: Damir Javor (SLO), Milivoje Jovčić (SRB), Ioannis Foufis (GRE)

15 December 2016	Darüşşafaka Doğuş (Turkey)	81–68	(Spain) Real Madrid	Istanbul
18:00 (CET)	Scoring by quarter: 17–20, 18–11, 17–13, 29–24
	Pts: Wanamaker 27; Rebs: Erden 7 Asts: Wilbekin 3 PIR: Wanamaker 31	Boxscore	Pts: Reyes 16; Rebs: Ayón 9 Asts: Dončić, Draper 6 PIR: Hunter, Reyes 18	Arena: Volkswagen Arena; Attendance: 4,933; Referees: Fernando Rocha (POR), Elias Koromilas (GRE), Tomislav Hordov (CRO)

15 December 2016	Žalgiris (Lithuania)	75–88	(Greece) Olympiacos	Kaunas
19:00 (CET)	Scoring by quarter: 23–21, 17–21, 20–21, 15–25
	Pts: Jankūnas 18; Rebs: Jankūnas 7 Asts: Lekavičius 8 PIR: Jankūnas, Lekavičius 13	Boxscore	Pts: Lojeski, Papanikolaou 16; Rebs: Lojeski 8 Asts: Spanoulis 8 PIR: Papanikolaou 23	Arena: Žalgirio Arena; Attendance: 11,097; Referees: Ilija Belošević (SRB), Robert Lottermoser (GER), Carlos Cortés (ESP)

15 December 2016	Crvena zvezda mts (Serbia)	83–58	(Israel) Maccabi Tel Aviv	Belgrade
20:00 (CET)	Scoring by quarter: 19–14, 23–10, 23–18, 18–16
	Pts: Simonović 14; Rebs: Bjelica 6 Asts: Jović 9 PIR: Simonović 22	Boxscore	Pts: Seeley 15; Rebs: Zirbes 6 Asts: Pnini 5 PIR: Zirbes 16	Arena: Aleksandar Nikolić; Attendance: 6,489; Referees: Christos Christodoulou (GRE), Daniel Hierrezuelo (ESP), Emin Moğulkoç (TUR)

15 December 2016	Brose Bamberg (Germany)	91–83	(Turkey) Anadolu Efes	Nuremberg
20:45 (CET)	Scoring by quarter: 23–22, 25–19, 23–23, 20–19
	Pts: Causeur 28; Rebs: three players 7 Asts: Zisis 6 PIR: Causeur 35	Boxscore	Pts: Granger 23; Rebs: Brown 11; Asts: Brown 5 PIR: Brown 29	Arena: Arena Nürnberger Versicherung; Attendance: 8,000; Referees: Emilio Pérez Pizarro (ESP), Spiros Gkontas (GRE), Piotr Pastusiak (POL)

16 December 2016	Galatasaray Odeabank (Turkey)	83–80	(Italy) EA7 Emporio Armani Milan	Istanbul
18:00 (CET)	Scoring by quarter: 21–15, 22–17, 19–27, 21–21
	Pts: Micov 23; Rebs: Tyus 7 Asts: Güler, Schilb 5 PIR: Micov 27	Boxscore	Pts: Sanders 18; Rebs: Dragić 8 Asts: three players 4 PIR: Hickman, Raduljica 16	Arena: Abdi İpekçi Arena; Attendance: 3,820; Referees: Saša Pukl (SLO), Juan Carlos García González (ESP), Anne Panther (GER)

16 December 2016	CSKA Moscow (Russia)	92–76	(Spain) FC Barcelona Lassa	Moscow
18:30 (CET)	Scoring by quarter: 24–11, 20–31, 27–23, 21–11
	Pts: Higgins 23; Rebs: five players 3 Asts: Teodosić 11; PIR: Teodosić 26	Boxscore	Pts: Claver 17; Rebs: Vezenkov 9 Asts: Renfroe 4 PIR: Claver 24	Arena: Megasport Arena; Attendance: 11,273; Referees: Sreten Radović (CRO), Carmelo Paternicò (ITA), Matej Boltauzer (SLO)

16 December 2016	Panathinaikos Superfoods (Greece)	81–70	(Turkey) Fenerbahçe	Athens
20:45 (CET)	Scoring by quarter: 23–14, 18–23, 20–15, 20–18
	Pts: N. Calathes 16; Rebs: N. Calathes 8 Asts: N. Calathes 11; PIR: N. Calathes 34	Boxscore	Pts: Nunnally 21; Rebs: Udoh 9 Asts: Dixon, Udoh 4 PIR: Udoh 21	Arena: Olympic Sports Center Athens; Attendance: 13,204; Referees: Borys Ryzhyk (UKR), Oļegs Latiševs (LAT), Petri Mäntylä (FIN)

=== Round 13 ===
20 December 2016	UNICS (Russia)	73–60	(Turkey) Galatasaray Odeabank	Kazan
17:00 (CET)	Scoring by quarter: 15–11, 22–20, 18–12, 18–17
	Pts: Voronov 22; Rebs: Williams 7 Asts: Colom 7 PIR: Voronov 23	Boxscore	Pts: Güler 17; Rebs: Preldžić 7 Asts: Güler 6 PIR: Güler 23	Arena: Basket Hall Kazan; Attendance: 3,758 (tentative); Referees: Ilija Belošević (SRB), Robert Lottermosser (GER), Petri Mäntylä (FIN)

20 December 2016	Anadolu Efes (Turkey)	71–84	(Lithuania) Žalgiris	Istanbul
18:30 (CET)	Scoring by quarter: 13–16, 17–28, 21–22, 20–18
	Pts: Heurtel 18; Rebs: Honeycutt 8 Asts: Granger, Heurtel 4 PIR: Heurtel 23	Boxscore	Pts: Pangos 15; Rebs: Lima 7 Asts: Westermann 6 PIR: Pangos 17	Arena: Abdi İpekçi Arena; Attendance: 2,424 (tentative); Referees: Daniel Hierrezuelo (ESP), Elias Koromilas (GRE), Sašo Petek (SLO)

20 December 2016	Olympiacos (Greece)	73–65	(Serbia) Crvena zvezda mts	Piraeus
20:00 (CET)	Scoring by quarter: 22–18, 23–16, 11–9, 17–22
	Pts: Lojeski 18; Rebs: Milutinov, Papanikolaou 6 Asts: Spanoulis 5 PIR: Lojeski 20	Boxscore	Pts: Jović 16; Rebs: Kuzmić 14; Asts: Jenkins 5 PIR: Kuzmić 18	Arena: Peace and Friendship Stadium; Attendance: 7,500 (tentative); Referees: Saša Pukl (SLO), Carmelo Paternicò (ITA), Anne Panther (GER)

20 December 2016	Real Madrid (Spain)	95–72	(Germany) Brose Bamberg	Madrid
20:45 (CET)	Scoring by quarter: 24–9, 23–16, 25–15, 23–32
	Pts: Dončić 16; Rebs: three players 7 Asts: Llull 6 PIR: Dončić 25	Boxscore	Pts: Staiger 18; Rebs: Theis 5 Asts: three players 3 PIR: Staiger 21	Arena: Barclaycard Center; Attendance: 8,210 (tentative); Referees: Christos Christodoulou (GRE), Borys Rhyzhyk (UKR), Miloš Koljenšić (MNE)

21 December 2016	Fenerbahçe (Turkey)	64–71	(Turkey) Darüşşafaka Doğuş	Istanbul
18:45 (CET)	Scoring by quarter: 18–20, 17–17, 13–13, 16–21
	Pts: Sloukas 16; Rebs: Udoh 7 Asts: Sloukas 4 PIR: Udoh 18	Boxscore	Pts: Wilbekin 22; Rebs: Clyburn 7 Asts: Anderson, Clyburn 2 PIR: Clyburn 24	Arena: Fenerbahçe Ülker Sports Arena; Attendance: 7,891 (tentative); Referees: Luigi Lamonica (ITA), Emilio Pérez Pizarro (ESP), Spiros Gkontas (GRE)

21 December 2016	EA7 Emporio Armani Milan (Italy)	72–86	(Greece) Panathinaikos Superfoods	Assago
20:00 (CET)	Scoring by quarter: 21–16, 8–24, 13–24, 30–22
	Pts: McLean 16; Rebs: McLean 9 Asts: Kalnietis 6 PIR: McLean 24	Boxscore	Pts: James 19; Rebs: Singleton 10; Asts: N. Calathes 6 PIR: James 25	Arena: Mediolanum Forum; Attendance: 8,468 (tentative); Referees: Damir Javor (SLO), Piotr Pastusiak (POL), Seffi Shemmesh (ISR)

21 December 2016	Maccabi Tel Aviv (Israel)	76–80	(Russia) CSKA Moscow	Tel Aviv
20:05 (CET)	Scoring by quarter: 31–16, 15–26, 13–16, 17–22
	Pts: Goudelock 19; Rebs: Rudd, Smith 8 Asts: Goudelock 5 PIR: Rudd 19	Boxscore	Pts: Higgins 16; Rebs: four players 4 Asts: Fridzon, Jackson 5 PIR: Higgins 19	Arena: Menora Mivtachim Arena; Attendance: 10,728 (tentative); Referees: Miguel Pérez Pérez (ESP), Tomislav Hordov (CRO), Milija Vojinović (SRB)

21 December 2016	Baskonia (Spain)	65–62	(Spain) FC Barcelona Lassa	Vitoria-Gasteiz
20:30 (CET)	Scoring by quarter: 9–16, 15–14, 23–15, 18–17
	Pts: Beaubois 19; Rebs: Voigtmann 8 Asts: Luz 3 PIR: Beaubois 18	Boxscore	Pts: Tomić 18; Rebs: Claver 8 Asts: Rice 8 PIR: Tomić 27	Arena: Fernando Buesa Arena; Attendance: 14,236 (tentative); Referees: Fernando Rocha (POR), Oļegs Latiševs (LAT), Jakub Zamojski (POL)

=== Round 14 ===
22 December 2016	Galatasaray Odeabank (Turkey)	76–86	(Turkey) Anadolu Efes	Istanbul
18:00 (CET)	Scoring by quarter: 18–16, 26–22, 14–22, 18–26
	Pts: Schilb 21; Rebs: Tyus 13; Asts: Güler 9 PIR: Tyus 29	Boxscore	Pts: Paul 19; Rebs: Dunston 8 Asts: Heurtel 8 PIR: Brown 23	Arena: Abdi İpekçi Arena; Attendance: 3,162; Referees: Borys Rhyzhyk (UKR), Carmelo Paternicò (ITA), Aare Halliko (EST)

22 December 2016	Crvena zvezda mts (Serbia)	82–70	(Spain) Real Madrid	Belgrade
19:00 (CET)	Scoring by quarter: 20–19, 23–16, 19–16, 20–19
	Pts: Simonović 20; Rebs: Kuzmić 8 Asts: Jović 6 PIR: Simonović 22	Boxscore	Pts: Taylor 25; Rebs: Ayón, Randolph 5 Asts: Ayón 7 PIR: Taylor 27	Arena: Aleksandar Nikolić; Attendance: 6,498; Referees: Ioannis Foufis (GRE), Petri Mäntylä (FIN), Marcin Kowalski (POL)

22 December 2016	Žalgiris (Lithuania)	80–88	(Russia) UNICS	Kaunas
19:00 (CET)	Scoring by quarter: 19–23, 27–20, 23–15, 11–30
	Pts: Jankūnas 21; Rebs: Kavaliauskas 6 Asts: Lekavičius 6 PIR: Jankūnas 23	Boxscore	Pts: Langford 26; Rebs: Kaimakoglou 6 Asts: Colom 8 PIR: Langford 36	Arena: Žalgirio Arena; Attendance: 11,095; Referees: Christos Christodoulou (GRE), Carlos Peruga (ESP), Marko Juras (SRB)

22 December 2016	Brose Bamberg (Germany)	82–68	(Greece) Olympiacos	Bamberg
20:00 (CET)	Scoring by quarter: 23–13, 25–17, 11–20, 23–18
	Pts: Miller 20; Rebs: Melli 9 Asts: Strēlnieks 7 PIR: Melli 23	Boxscore	Pts: Spanoulis 15; Rebs: Papanikolaou 8 Asts: Spanoulis 4 PIR: Papanikolaou 18	Arena: Brose Arena; Attendance: 6,150; Referees: Sreten Radović (CRO), Benjamín Jiménez (ESP), Emin Moğulkoç (TUR)

23 December 2016	CSKA Moscow (Russia)	79–95(OT)	(Turkey) Fenerbahçe	Moscow
18:00 (CET)	Scoring by quarter: 23–13, 18–23, 18–22, 16–17, Overtime: 4–20
	Pts: Teodosić 21; Rebs: Augustine, Khryapa 6 Asts: Jackson 6 PIR: Kurbanov, Teodosić 16	Boxscore	Pts: Dixon 25; Rebs: Udoh 11; Asts: Dixon 6 PIR: Udoh 33	Arena: Megasport Arena; Attendance: 8,011; Referees: Daniel Hierrezuelo (ESP), Robert Lottermosser (GER), Jakub Zamojski (POL)

23 December 2016	Darüşşafaka Doğuş (Turkey)	86–84	(Israel) Maccabi Tel Aviv	Istanbul
18:45 (CET)	Scoring by quarter: 13–22, 18–26, 27–13, 28–23
	Pts: Wilbekin 23; Rebs: Clyburn 12; Asts: Wilbekin 5 PIR: Wilbekin 22	Boxscore	Pts: Goudelock 23; Rebs: Smith 11; Asts: Goudelock, Ohayon 3 PIR: Goudelock 22	Arena: Volkswagen Arena; Attendance: 4,064; Referees: Milivoje Jovčić (SRB), Damir Javor (SLO), Oļegs Latiševs (LAT)

23 December 2016	Panathinaikos Superfoods (Greece)	69–68	(Spain) Baskonia	Athens
20:15 (CET)	Scoring by quarter: 27–18, 10–23, 18–18, 14–9
	Pts: Singleton 23; Rebs: N. Calathes 6 Asts: N. Calathes 6 PIR: Singleton 26	Boxscore	Pts: Shengelia 17; Rebs: Diop 10; Asts: Larkin 3 PIR: Diop 16	Arena: Olympic Sports Center Athens; Attendance: 10,714; Referees: Luigi Lamonica (ITA), Matej Boltauzer (SLO), Tomislav Hordov (CRO)

23 December 2016	FC Barcelona Lassa (Spain)	89–75	(Italy) EA7 Emporio Armani Milan	Barcelona
21:00 (CET)	Scoring by quarter: 32–19, 17–16, 23–16, 17–24
	Pts: Tomić 19; Rebs: Dorsey 10; Asts: Rice 11; PIR: Tomić 32	Boxscore	Pts: Sanders 27; Rebs: three players 4 Asts: Hickman 8 PIR: Sanders 29	Arena: Palau Blaugrana; Attendance: 4,911; Referees: Ilija Belošević (SRB), Sašo Petek (SLO), Amit Balak (ISR)

=== Round 15 ===
29 December 2016	Anadolu Efes (Turkey)	78–80	(Spain) Real Madrid	Istanbul
18:00 (CET)	Scoring by quarter: 22–21, 14–16, 27–24, 15–19
	Pts: Paul 16; Rebs: Honeycutt 10; Asts: Heurtel 6 PIR: Dunston 17	Boxscore	Pts: Dončić 17; Rebs: Hunter 8 Asts: Dončić 9 PIR: Dončić 31	Arena: Abdi İpekçi Arena; Attendance: 4,722; Referees: Damir Javor (SLO), Oļegs Latiševs (LAT), Robert Vyklický (CZE)

29 December 2016	Crvena zvezda mts (Serbia)	78–67	(Russia) CSKA Moscow	Belgrade
19:00 (CET)	Scoring by quarter: 27–14, 21–20, 16–22, 14–11
	Pts: Kuzmić 16; Rebs: Kuzmić 10; Asts: Jenkins 6 PIR: Kuzmić 31	Boxscore	Pts: Vorontsevich 21; Rebs: Augustine 6 Asts: Jackson 8 PIR: Vorontsevich 19	Arena: Kombank Arena; Attendance: 18,487; Referees: Juan Carlos García González (ESP), Emin Moğulkoç (TUR), David Romano (ISR)

29 December 2016	Olympiacos (Greece)	71–62	(Turkey) Fenerbahçe	Piraeus
20:00 (CET)	Scoring by quarter: 18–9, 22–12, 18–19, 13–22
	Pts: Lojeski 14; Rebs: Birch 13; Asts: Spanoulis 7 PIR: Birch 24	Boxscore	Pts: Veselý 22; Rebs: Veselý 10; Asts: Sloukas 6 PIR: Veselý 29	Arena: Peace and Friendship Stadium; Attendance: 11,039; Referees: Miguel Pérez Pérez (ESP), Borys Rhyzhyk (UKR), Piotr Pastusiak (POL)

29 December 2016	EA7 Emporio Armani Milan (Italy)	70–78	(Lithuania) Žalgiris	Assago
20:45 (CET)	Scoring by quarter: 16–21, 17–15, 23–20, 14–22
	Pts: Kalnietis 16; Rebs: Sanders 5 Asts: McLean 5 PIR: Sanders 15	Boxscore	Pts: Milaknis 16; Rebs: Jankūnas 11; Asts: Pangos 7 PIR: Milaknis 17	Arena: Mediolanum Forum; Attendance: 9,851; Referees: Fernando Rocha (POR), Robert Lottermoser (GER), Ioannis Foufis (GRE)

29 December 2016	Baskonia (Spain)	101–88	(Israel) Maccabi Tel Aviv	Vitoria-Gasteiz
21:00 (CET)	Scoring by quarter: 30–24, 12–16, 29–24, 30–24
	Pts: Voigtmann 23; Rebs: Voigtmann 9 Asts: Larkin 13; PIR: Voigtmann 26	Boxscore	Pts: Rudd 20; Rebs: Rudd 5 Asts: Mekel, Rudd 5 PIR: Rudd 32	Arena: Fernando Buesa Arena; Attendance: 14,875; Referees: Ilija Belošević (SRB), Spiros Gkontas (GRE), Clemens Fritz (GER)

30 December 2016	UNICS (Russia)	83–81	(Greece) Panathinaikos Superfoods	Kazan
17:00 (CET)	Scoring by quarter: 13–19, 22–25, 28–21, 20–16
	Pts: Langford 27; Rebs: Williams 9 Asts: Langford 5 PIR: Langford 38	Boxscore	Pts: N. Calathes 23; Rebs: Singleton 8 Asts: N. Calathes 6 PIR: Bourousis, N. Calathes 21	Arena: Basket Hall Kazan; Attendance: 5,176; Referees: Sreten Radović (CRO), Milivoje Jovčić (SRB), Sérgio Silva (POR)

30 December 2016	Galatasaray Odeabank (Turkey)	75–90	(Germany) Brose Bamberg	Istanbul
18:00 (CET)	Scoring by quarter: 19–24, 19–23, 14–27, 23–16
	Pts: Daye 20; Rebs: Tyus 8 Asts: Güler 7 PIR: Daye 29	Boxscore	Pts: Strēlnieks 18; Rebs: Theis 14; Asts: Causeur, Strēlnieks 4 PIR: Theis 21	Arena: Abdi İpekçi Arena; Attendance: 2,036; Referees: Daniel Hierrezuelo (ESP), Elias Koromilas (GRE), Tomislav Hordov (CRO)

30 December 2016	FC Barcelona Lassa (Spain)	81–77	(Turkey) Darüşşafaka Doğuş	Barcelona
21:00 (CET)	Scoring by quarter: 19–22, 16–18, 24–17, 22–20
	Pts: Tomić 16; Rebs: Dorsey 6 Asts: Navarro, Tomić 5 PIR: Tomić 23	Boxscore	Pts: Anderson 21; Rebs: Anderson, Žižić 6 Asts: Wilbekin 3 PIR: Anderson 23	Arena: Palau Blaugrana; Attendance: 5,248; Referees: Carmelo Paternicò (ITA), Matej Boltauzer (SLO), Jurgis Laurinavičius (LTU)

=== Round 16 ===
5 January 2017	Anadolu Efes (Turkey)	84–73	(Turkey) Galatasaray Odeabank	Istanbul
18:30 (CET)	Scoring by quarter: 22–18, 20–18, 24–23, 18–14
	Pts: Dunston 17; Rebs: Heurtel 8 Asts: Heurtel 7 PIR: Dunston 21	Boxscore	Pts: Güler 20; Rebs: Tyus 10; Asts: Schilb 5 PIR: Tyus 25	Arena: Abdi İpekçi Arena; Attendance: 2,440; Referees: Saša Pukl (SLO), Juan Carlos García González (ESP), Petros Papapetrou (GRE)

5 January 2017	Brose Bamberg (Germany)	85–65	(Spain) FC Barcelona Lassa	Bamberg
20:00 (CET)	Scoring by quarter: 18–17, 22–14, 19–16, 26–18
	Pts: Strēlnieks, Miller 20; Rebs: Melli 13; Asts: Causeur, McNeal 5 PIR: Melli 30	Boxscore	Pts: Rice 19; Rebs: Doellman, Oleson 5 Asts: Rice, Navarro 4 PIR: Rice 15	Arena: Brose Arena; Attendance: 6,150; Referees: Fernando Rocha (POR), Borys Rhyzhyk (UKR), Mario Majkić (SLO)

5 January 2017	Maccabi Tel Aviv (Israel)	93–92	(Turkey) Darüşşafaka Doğuş	Tel Aviv
20:05 (CET)	Scoring by quarter: 29–14, 24–22, 14–35, 26–21
	Pts: Weems 24; Rebs: Goudelock 6 Asts: Weems 8 PIR: Weems 33	Boxscore	Pts: Clyburn 17; Rebs: Žižić 9 Asts: Wanamaker 8 PIR: Wanamaker 25	Arena: Menora Mivtachim Arena; Attendance: 10,728; Referees: Luigi Lamonica (ITA), Elias Koromilas (GRE), Renaud Geller (BEL)

5 January 2017	Baskonia (Spain)	102–70	(Russia) UNICS	Vitoria-Gasteiz
21:00 (CET)	Scoring by quarter: 25–15, 28–21, 24–14, 25–20
	Pts: Beaubois 29; Rebs: Voigtmann 8 Asts: Larkin 8 PIR: Beaubois 25	Boxscore	Pts: Langford 19; Rebs: Langford, Parakhouski 6 Asts: Langford 5 PIR: Langford 29	Arena: Fernando Buesa Arena; Attendance: 10,645; Referees: Robert Lottermoser (GER), Emin Moğulkoç (TUR), Uroš Obrknežević (SRB)

6 January 2017	Fenerbahçe (Turkey)	86–79	(Italy) EA7 Emporio Armani Milan	Istanbul
18:45 (CET)	Scoring by quarter: 18–19, 23–21, 22–18, 23–21
	Pts: Nunnally 19; Rebs: Udoh 8 Asts: Nunnally 5 PIR: Nunnally, Udoh 23	Boxscore	Pts: Kalnietis 20; Rebs: Raduljica 5 Asts: Dragić, Hickman 4 PIR: Kalnietis 23	Arena: Fenerbahçe Ülker Sports Arena; Attendance: 8,308; Referees: Christos Christodoulou (GRE), Matej Boltauzer (SLO), Carlos Cortés (ESP)

6 January 2017	Žalgiris (Lithuania)	61–77	(Serbia) Crvena zvezda mts	Kaunas
19:00 (CET)	Scoring by quarter: 7–21, 15–26, 17–14, 22–16
	Pts: Jankūnas 10; Rebs: Kavaliauskas 7 Asts: Lekavičius 7 PIR: Lekavičius 15	Boxscore	Pts: Simonović 16; Rebs: Dangubić 6 Asts: Bjelica 8 PIR: Lazić 20	Arena: Žalgirio Arena; Attendance: 10,433; Referees: Spiros Gkontas (GRE), Benjamín Jiménez (ESP), Clemens Fritz (GER)

6 January 2017	Olympiacos (Greece)	77–69	(Greece) Panathinaikos Superfoods	Piraeus
20:00 (CET)	Scoring by quarter: 17–11, 21–26, 17–13, 22–19
	Pts: Papapetrou 13; Rebs: Birch 9 Asts: Spanoulis 7 PIR: Birch 20	Boxscore	Pts: James 24; Rebs: Singleton, James 6 Asts: N. Calathes 3 PIR: James 29	Arena: Peace and Friendship Stadium; Attendance: 10,736; Referees: Damir Javor (SLO), Carmelo Paternicò (ITA), Oļegs Latiševs (LAT)

6 January 2017	Real Madrid (Spain)	95–85	(Russia) CSKA Moscow	Madrid
21:00 (CET)	Scoring by quarter: 23–24, 27–22, 24–24, 21–15
	Pts: Llull 24; Rebs: Randolph 9 Asts: Llull 6 PIR: Ayón, Llull 24	Boxscore	Pts: de Colo 18; Rebs: Augustine 5 Asts: Teodosić 5 PIR: Khryapa 15	Arena: WiZink Center; Attendance: 11,998; Referees: Sreten Radović (CRO), Milivoje Jovčić (SRB), Piotr Pastusiak (POL)

=== Round 17 ===
12 January 2017	UNICS (Russia)	63–58	(Germany) Brose Bamberg	Kazan
17:00 (CET)	Scoring by quarter: 13–20, 17–16, 16–11, 17–11
	Pts: Langford 27; Rebs: Langford 10; Asts: Langford 5 PIR: Langford 29	Boxscore	Pts: Strēlnieks 13; Rebs: Melli 10; Asts: Strēlnieks 6 PIR: Strēlnieks 27	Arena: Basket Hall Kazan; Attendance: 3,483; Referees: Damir Javor (SLO), Carlos Cortés (ESP), Aare Halliko (EST)

12 January 2017	Darüşşafaka Doğuş (Turkey)	98–89	(Spain) Baskonia	Istanbul
18:00 (CET)	Scoring by quarter: 20–24, 27–22, 30–22, 21–21
	Pts: Bertāns 29; Rebs: Clyburn, Moerman 9 Asts: Bertāns 5 PIR: Bertāns 31	Boxscore	Pts: Hanga 19; Rebs: Voigtmann 8 Asts: Larkin 9 PIR: Hanga, Budinger 19	Arena: Volkswagen Arena; Attendance: 4,126; Referees: Sreten Radović (CRO), Ioannis Foufis (GRE), Mario Majkić (SLO)

12 January 2017	Crvena zvezda mts (Serbia)	75–73	(Turkey) Fenerbahçe	Belgrade
20:45 (CET)	Scoring by quarter: 23–23, 21–19, 17–17, 14–14
	Pts: Kuzmić 21; Rebs: Kuzmić 8 Asts: Jović 7 PIR: Kuzmić 28	Boxscore	Pts: Udoh, Datome 16; Rebs: Bogdanović 6 Asts: Bogdanović 6 PIR: Udoh 25	Arena: Aleksandar Nikolić; Attendance: 7,648; Referees: Robert Lottermoser (GER), Elias Koromilas (GRE), Robert Vyklický (CZE)

12 January 2017	FC Barcelona Lassa (Spain)	67–69	(Greece) Olympiacos	Barcelona
21:00 (CET)	Scoring by quarter: 20–17, 13–12, 21–27, 13–13
	Pts: Koponen 16; Rebs: Tomić 9 Asts: Rice 5 PIR: Koponen 14	Boxscore	Pts: Printezis 16; Rebs: Printezis 9 Asts: Lojeski 4 PIR: Printezis 20	Arena: Palau Blaugrana; Attendance: 5,173; Referees: Luigi Lamonica (ITA), Milivoje Jovčić (SRB), Sašo Petek (SLO)

13 January 2017	CSKA Moscow (Russia)	101–64	(Italy) EA7 Emporio Armani Milan	Moscow
18:00 (CET)	Scoring by quarter: 27–9, 29–16, 22–21, 23–18
	Pts: de Colo 22; Rebs: Augustine 6 Asts: Teodosić 7 PIR: de Colo 30	Boxscore	Pts: Mačvan 19; Rebs: Mačvan 11; Asts: Simon 5 PIR: Mačvan 33	Arena: Megasport Arena; Attendance: 7,511; Referees: Miguel Pérez Pérez (ESP), Petri Mäntylä (FIN), Rain Peerandi (EST)

13 January 2017	Galatasaray Odeabank (Turkey)	87–79	(Lithuania) Žalgiris	Istanbul
18:00 (CET)	Scoring by quarter: 17–17, 23–17, 25–23, 22–22
	Pts: Fitipaldo 21; Rebs: Pleiß 7 Asts: Fitipaldo 6 PIR: Micov, Pleiß 21	Boxscore	Pts: Motum 18; Rebs: Jankūnas 7 Asts: Westermann 8 PIR: Lekavičius, Westermann 17	Arena: Abdi İpekçi Arena; Attendance: 2,319; Referees: Christos Christodoulou (GRE), Boris Ryzhyk (UKR), Miloš Koljenšić (MNE)

13 January 2017	Panathinaikos Superfoods (Greece)	92–81(OT)	(Turkey) Anadolu Efes	Athens
20:45 (CET)	Scoring by quarter: 21–13, 17–19, 12–18, 20–20, Overtime: 22–11
	Pts: Rivers 23; Rebs: Singleton 8 Asts: James 6 PIR: James 19	Boxscore	Pts: Heurtel 15; Rebs: Honeycutt 12; Asts: Granger 4 PIR: Brown 18	Arena: Olympic Sports Center Athens; Attendance: 9,375; Referees: Fernando Rocha (POR), Matej Boltauzer (SLO), David Romano (ISR)

13 January 2017	Real Madrid (Spain)	80–75	(Israel) Maccabi Tel Aviv	Madrid
21:00 (CET)	Scoring by quarter: 16–21, 21–15, 16–20, 27–19
	Pts: Fernández, Ayón 14; Rebs: Dončić 11; Asts: Dončić 8 PIR: Dončić 32	Boxscore	Pts: Goudelock, Rudd 18; Rebs: Iverson 10; Asts: Smith 3 PIR: Rudd 25	Arena: WiZink Center; Attendance: 11,079; Referees: Saša Pukl (SLO), Carmelo Paternicò (ITA), Marko Juras (SRB)

=== Round 18 ===
19 January 2017	CSKA Moscow (Russia)	85–64	(Germany) Brose Bamberg	Moscow
18:00 (CET)	Scoring by quarter: 21–17, 23–16, 25–15, 16–16
	Pts: de Colo 26; Rebs: Kurbanov 5 Asts: Jackson, Khryapa 6 PIR: de Colo 35	Boxscore	Pts: Theis 16; Rebs: Melli, Theis 5 Asts: three players 3 PIR: Melli 20	Arena: Megasport Arena; Attendance: 6,173; Referees: Matej Boltauzer (SLO), Emilio Pérez Pizarro (ESP), Tomislav Hordov (CRO)

19 January 2017	Fenerbahçe (Turkey)	84–63	(Greece) Panathinaikos Superfoods	Istanbul
18:30 (CET)	Scoring by quarter: 27–16, 17–12, 16–17, 24–18
	Pts: Datome 16; Rebs: Antić 8 Asts: Bogdanović 5 PIR: Veselý 19	Boxscore	Pts: James 25; Rebs: Gabriel 7 Asts: N. Calathes 4 PIR: James 33	Arena: Fenerbahçe Ülker Sports Arena; Attendance: 11,735; Referees: Luigi Lamonica (ITA), Boris Ryzhyk (UKR), Rain Peerandi (EST)

19 January 2017	Maccabi Tel Aviv (Israel)	67–71	(Serbia) Crvena zvezda mts	Tel Aviv
20:05 (CET)	Scoring by quarter: 17–16, 17–17, 20–15, 13–23
	Pts: Goudelock 19; Rebs: Smith 9 Asts: Ohayon 5 PIR: Goudelock 23	Boxscore	Pts: Jović 14; Rebs: Kuzmić 9 Asts: Jović 7 PIR: Kuzmić 17	Arena: Menora Mivtachim Arena; Attendance: 10,728; Referees: Fernando Rocha (POR), Juan Carlos García González (ESP), Ioannis Foufis (GRE)

19 January 2017	EA7 Emporio Armani Milan (Italy)	92–87	(Turkey) Galatasaray Odeabank	Assago
20:15 (CET)	Scoring by quarter: 23–21, 26–18, 22–21, 21–27
	Pts: Simon 19; Rebs: Mačvan 6 Asts: Simon 5 PIR: Simon 22	Boxscore	Pts: Fitipaldo, Güler 17; Rebs: Tyus, Pleiß 5 Asts: Schilb 8 PIR: Güler 22	Arena: Mediolanum Forum; Attendance: 8,863; Referees: Robert Lottermoser (GER), Milivoje Jovčić (SRB), Jakub Zamojski (POL)

19 January 2017	FC Barcelona Lassa (Spain)	89–78	(Turkey) Anadolu Efes	Barcelona
21:00 (CET)	Scoring by quarter: 16–15, 17–19, 30–19, 26–25
	Pts: Koponen 20; Rebs: Faverani 8 Asts: Rice 9 PIR: Faverani 23	Boxscore	Pts: Paul 25; Rebs: Dunston 8 Asts: Granger 3 PIR: Paul 17	Arena: Palau Blaugrana; Attendance: 3,389; Referees: Christos Christodoulou (GRE), Ilija Belošević (SRB), Anne Panther (GER)

20 January 2017	Darüşşafaka Doğuş (Turkey)	71–64	(Russia) UNICS	Istanbul
18:00 (CET)	Scoring by quarter: 23–17, 10–17, 18–18, 20–12
	Pts: Moerman 17; Rebs: three players 7 Asts: Wanamaker 5 PIR: Wanamaker 21	Boxscore	Pts: Langford 16; Rebs: Parakhouski, Williams 8 Asts: Stoll 8 PIR: Parakhouski 22	Arena: Volkswagen Arena; Attendance: 4,653; Referees: Carmelo Paternicò (ITA), Spiros Gkontas (GRE), Benjamín Jiménez (ESP)

20 January 2017	Žalgiris (Lithuania)	59–74	(Spain) Real Madrid	Kaunas
18:00 (CET)	Scoring by quarter: 17–17, 16–24, 20–12, 6–21
	Pts: Lima 13; Rebs: Jankūnas 7 Asts: Westermann 7 PIR: Lima 17	Boxscore	Pts: Hunter 14; Rebs: Hunter 6 Asts: Llull 8 PIR: Ayón 22	Arena: Žalgirio Arena; Attendance: 12,896; Referees: Damir Javor (SLO), Oļegs Latiševs (LAT), Emin Moğulkoç (TUR)

20 January 2017	Olympiacos (Greece)	92–62	(Spain) Baskonia	Piraeus
20:00 (CET)	Scoring by quarter: 24–17, 26–11, 26–15, 16–19
	Pts: three players 12; Rebs: Birch, Papanikolaou 7 Asts: Spanoulis 7 PIR: Papanikolaou 19	Boxscore	Pts: Larkin 12; Rebs: Voigtmann, Hanga 8 Asts: three players 2 PIR: Hanga 17	Arena: Peace and Friendship Stadium; Attendance: 9,592; Referees: Saša Pukl (SLO), Boris Ryzhyk (UKR), Seffi Shemmesh (ISR)

=== Round 19 ===
24 January 2017	UNICS (Russia)	81–86	(Turkey) Fenerbahçe	Kazan
17:00 (CET)	Scoring by quarter: 15–22, 19–17, 26–29, 21–18
	Pts: Parakhouski 21; Rebs: Parakhouski 9 Asts: Clarke 5 PIR: Parakhouski 28	Boxscore	Pts: Datome 18; Rebs: Bogdanović 5 Asts: Bogdanović 7 PIR: Bogdanović 25	Arena: Basket Hall Kazan; Attendance: 3,633; Referees: Christos Christodoulou (GRE), Tomislav Hordov (CRO), Jakub Zamojski (POL)

24 January 2017	Galatasaray Odeabank (Turkey)	102–63	(Israel) Maccabi Tel Aviv	Istanbul
18:00 (CET)	Scoring by quarter: 20–16, 32–23, 20–13, 30–11
	Pts: Diebler 21; Rebs: Diebler 6 Asts: Güler 12; PIR: Diebler 26	Boxscore	Pts: Goudelock 22; Rebs: Iverson 8 Asts: three players 3 PIR: Goudelock 20	Arena: Abdi İpekçi Arena; Attendance: 3,284; Referees: Damir Javor (SLO), Miguel Pérez Pérez (ESP), Clemens Fritz (GER)

24 January 2017	Žalgiris (Lithuania)	79–74	(Russia) CSKA Moscow	Kaunas
19:00 (CET)	Scoring by quarter: 20–20, 18–25, 19–16, 22–13
	Pts: Pangos 21; Rebs: Ulanovas 6 Asts: Westermann 10; PIR: Pangos 19	Boxscore	Pts: Augustine 15; Rebs: Augustine 7 Asts: Jackson 8 PIR: Augustine 22	Arena: Žalgirio Arena; Attendance: 9,151; Referees: Saša Pukl (SLO), Benjamín Jiménez (ESP), Marko Juras (SRB)

24 January 2017	Panathinaikos Superfoods (Greece)	71–65	(Spain) FC Barcelona Lassa	Athens
19:45 (CET)	Scoring by quarter: 15–13, 21–16, 18–17, 17–19
	Pts: Bourousis 14; Rebs: Bourousis 11; Asts: James 4 PIR: Bourousis 31	Boxscore	Pts: Rice 12; Rebs: Tomić 10; Asts: Rice 5 PIR: Doellman 13	Arena: Olympic Sports Center Athens; Attendance: 10,179; Referees: Sreten Radović (CRO), Emin Moğulkoç (TUR), Carmelo Paternicò (ITA)

24 January 2017	Baskonia (Spain)	69–87	(Serbia) Crvena zvezda mts	Vitoria-Gasteiz
21:30 (CET)	Scoring by quarter: 15–25, 12–25, 22–20, 20–17
	Pts: Larkin 16; Rebs: Voigtmann 6 Asts: Larkin, Hanga 4 PIR: Larkin 19	Boxscore	Pts: Simonović 23; Rebs: Kuzmić 6 Asts: Jović 12; PIR: Jović 29	Arena: Fernando Buesa Arena; Attendance: 9,542; Referees: Luigi Lamonica (ITA), Oļegs Latiševs (LAT), Jurgis Laurinavičius (LTU)

25 January 2017	Anadolu Efes (Turkey)	93–81	(Turkey) Darüşşafaka Doğuş	Istanbul
18:30 (CET)	Scoring by quarter: 25–19, 17–19, 22–18, 29–25
	Pts: Paul 21; Rebs: Honeycutt 7 Asts: Heurtel 7 PIR: Heurtel 20	Boxscore	Pts: Wanamaker 24; Rebs: Žižić 18; Asts: Wanamaker 6 PIR: Wanamaker 26	Arena: Abdi İpekçi Arena; Attendance: 3,382; Referees: Daniel Hierrezuelo (ESP), Milivoje Jovčić (SRB), Elias Koromilas (GRE)

25 January 2017	Brose Bamberg (Germany)	89–91	(Spain) Real Madrid	Nuremberg
20:00 (CET)	Scoring by quarter: 21–25, 26–26, 22–19, 20–21
	Pts: Causeur 14; Rebs: Melli 6 Asts: Strēlnieks 8 PIR: Strēlnieks 18	Boxscore	Pts: Llull 26; Rebs: Ayón 8 Asts: three players 4 PIR: Ayón 28	Arena: Arena Nürnberger Versicherung; Attendance: 8,000; Referees: Ilija Belošević (SRB), Piotr Pastusiak (POL), Miloš Koljenšić (MNE)

25 January 2017	EA7 Emporio Armani Milan (Italy)	99–83	(Greece) Olympiacos	Assago
20:45 (CET)	Scoring by quarter: 15–21, 26–20, 26–20, 32–22
	Pts: Simon 16; Rebs: Mačvan, Pascolo 6 Asts: Simon 7 PIR: Pascolo, Simon 25	Boxscore	Pts: Printezis 16; Rebs: Birch, Papanikolaou 8 Asts: Spanoulis 4 PIR: Papanikolaou 19	Arena: Mediolanum Forum; Attendance: 8,040; Referees: Fernando Rocha (POR), Juan Carlos García González (ESP), Mario Majkić (SLO)

=== Round 20 ===
26 January 2017	Fenerbahçe (Turkey)	85–80	(Turkey) Galatasaray Odeabank	Istanbul
18:45 (CET)	Scoring by quarter: 19–27, 22–27, 23–12, 21–14
	Pts: Veselý 20; Rebs: Veselý 7 Asts: Sloukas 7 PIR: Veselý 30	Boxscore	Pts: Schilb 21; Rebs: Pleiß 6 Asts: Güler 8 PIR: Schilb 24	Arena: Fenerbahçe Ülker Sports Arena; Attendance: 12,731; Referees: Daniel Hierrezuelo (ESP), Carmelo Paternicò (ITA), Josip Radojković (CRO)

26 January 2017	Crvena zvezda mts (Serbia)	72–66	(Greece) Panathinaikos Superfoods	Belgrade
19:00 (CET)	Scoring by quarter: 20–14, 19–19, 18–23, 15–10
	Pts: Simonović 13; Rebs: Kuzmić 14; Asts: Jović 8 PIR: Kuzmić 24	Boxscore	Pts: Gabriel 23; Rebs: Rivers, Gentile 6 Asts: N. Calathes 4 PIR: Gabriel 23	Arena: Aleksandar Nikolić; Attendance: 6,387; Referees: Saša Pukl (SLO), Jakub Zamojski (POL), Sérgio Silva (POR)

26 January 2017	Maccabi Tel Aviv (Israel)	60–52	(Russia) UNICS	Tel Aviv
20:05 (CET)	Scoring by quarter: 16–9, 17–15, 12–14, 15–14
	Pts: Goudelock 17; Rebs: Rudd 8 Asts: Rudd 5 PIR: Goudelock, Rudd 14	Boxscore	Pts: Johnson 13; Rebs: Clarke, Banić 7 Asts: Stoll 2 PIR: Clarke 10	Arena: Menora Mivtachim Arena; Attendance: 10,728; Referees: Luigi Lamonica (ITA), Carlos Cortés (ESP), Rain Peerandi (EST)

27 January 2017	CSKA Moscow (Russia)	80–77	(Turkey) Anadolu Efes	Moscow
18:00 (CET)	Scoring by quarter: 25–24, 17–11, 23–17, 15–25
	Pts: de Colo 14; Rebs: Hines 10; Asts: de Colo, Vorontsevich 4 PIR: Hines 21	Boxscore	Pts: Heurtel 24; Rebs: Honeycutt, Dunston 6 Asts: Heurtel 4 PIR: Heurtel 27	Arena: Megasport Arena; Attendance: 7,833; Referees: Juan Carlos García González (ESP), Oļegs Latiševs (LAT), Miloš Koljenšić (MNE)

27 January 2017	Darüşşafaka Doğuş (Turkey)	66–69	(Lithuania) Žalgiris	Istanbul
18:45 (CET)	Scoring by quarter: 14–16, 17–22, 18–17, 17–14
	Pts: Wanamaker 17; Rebs: Moerman 9 Asts: Wanamaker 8 PIR: Wanamaker 21	Boxscore	Pts: Pangos 14; Rebs: Jankūnas 8 Asts: Lekavičius 4 PIR: Lima 14	Arena: Volkswagen Arena; Attendance: 4,578; Referees: Christos Christodoulou (GRE), Fernando Rocha (POR), Anne Panther (GER)

27 January 2017	FC Barcelona Lassa (Spain)	79–93	(Spain) Baskonia	Barcelona
19:00 (CET)	Scoring by quarter: 20–21, 23–32, 20–30, 16–10
	Pts: Rice 15; Rebs: Tomić 7 Asts: Koponen 5 PIR: Vezenkov 22	Boxscore	Pts: Larkin 18; Rebs: Hanga 7 Asts: Larkin, Laprovíttola 5 PIR: Larkin, Hanga 21	Arena: Palau Blaugrana; Attendance: 5,208; Referees: Robert Lottermoser (GER), Milivoje Jovčić (SRB), Piotr Pastusiak (POL)

27 January 2017	Olympiacos (Greece)	83–77	(Germany) Brose Bamberg	Piraeus
20:00 (CET)	Scoring by quarter: 24–13, 17–19, 24–24, 18–21
	Pts: Birch, Spanoulis 15; Rebs: Birch 14; Asts: Spanoulis 6 PIR: Birch 27	Boxscore	Pts: Melli 14; Rebs: Causeur, Melli 4 Asts: Causeur 5 PIR: Causeur 19	Arena: Peace and Friendship Stadium; Attendance: 8,201; Referees: Miguel Pérez Pérez (ESP), Carmelo Paternicò (ITA), David Romano (ISR)

27 January 2017	Real Madrid (Spain)	94–89	(Italy) EA7 Emporio Armani Milan	Madrid
21:00 (CET)	Scoring by quarter: 22–18, 24–31, 23–24, 25–16
	Pts: Llull 20; Rebs: Randolph, Ayón 8 Asts: Llull 9 PIR: Dončić 23	Boxscore	Pts: Simon 20; Rebs: Mačvan 7 Asts: Kalnietis 4 PIR: Simon 21	Arena: WiZink Center; Attendance: 10,358; Referees: Borys Ryzhyk (UKR), Elias Koromilas (GRE), Aare Halliko (EST)

=== Round 21 ===
2 February 2017	UNICS (Russia)	75–90	(Greece) Olympiacos	Kazan
17:00 (CET)	Scoring by quarter: 13–33, 23–23, 18–13, 21–21
	Pts: Langford 25; Rebs: Parakhouski 6 Asts: Langford 7 PIR: Langford 23	Boxscore	Pts: Green 25; Rebs: Milutinov 7 Asts: Mantzaris 6 PIR: Green 31	Arena: Basket Hall Kazan; Attendance: 4,082; Referees: Daniel Hierrezuelo (ESP), Saša Pukl (SLO), Aare Halliko (EST)

2 February 2017	Fenerbahçe (Turkey)	77–71	(Russia) CSKA Moscow	Istanbul
18:45 (CET)	Scoring by quarter: 15–14, 21–26, 24–11, 17–20
	Pts: Udoh 15; Rebs: Udoh 11; Asts: Bogdanović 8 PIR: Udoh 25	Boxscore	Pts: de Colo 23; Rebs: Kurbanov 6 Asts: de Colo 4 PIR: de Colo 24	Arena: Fenerbahçe Ülker Sports Arena; Attendance: 12,831; Referees: Miguel Pérez Pérez (ESP), Borys Ryzhyk (UKR), Robert Lottermoser (GER)

2 February 2017	Žalgiris (Lithuania)	89–85	(Spain) FC Barcelona Lassa	Kaunas
19:00 (CET)	Scoring by quarter: 18–24, 21–14, 22–23, 28–24
	Pts: Lekavičius, Ulanovas 17; Rebs: Lekavičius 5 Asts: Westermann 6 PIR: Lekavičius, Ulanovas 25	Boxscore	Pts: Navarro 17; Rebs: Tomić 6 Asts: Rice 7 PIR: Faverani 17	Arena: Žalgirio Arena; Attendance: 12,347; Referees: Ilija Belošević (SRB), Oļegs Latiševs (LAT), Tomislav Hordov (CRO)

2 February 2017	Brose Bamberg (Germany)	90–75	(Israel) Maccabi Tel Aviv	Bamberg
20:00 (CET)	Scoring by quarter: 16–21, 25–22, 25–10, 24–22
	Pts: Strēlnieks 25; Rebs: Melli 8 Asts: Zisis 6 PIR: Strēlnieks 28	Boxscore	Pts: Goudelock 22; Rebs: Rudd, Alexander 5 Asts: Pnini 3 PIR: Goudelock 22	Arena: Brose Arena; Attendance: 6,150; Referees: Christos Christodoulou (GRE), Juan Carlos García González (ESP), Igor Dragojević (MNE)

2 February 2017	EA7 Emporio Armani Milan (Italy)	89–87	(Turkey) Darüşşafaka Doğuş	Assago
20:45 (CET)	Scoring by quarter: 20–24, 18–27, 23–22, 28–14
	Pts: Pascolo, Simon 15; Rebs: Sanders 8 Asts: Simon 4 PIR: Simon 19	Boxscore	Pts: Wanamaker 20; Rebs: Žižić 8 Asts: Wanamaker 6 PIR: Wanamaker 29	Arena: Mediolanum Forum; Attendance: 8,072; Referees: Spiros Gkontas (GRE), Benjamín Jiménez (ESP), Uroš Obrknežević (SRB)

3 February 2017	Galatasaray Odeabank (Turkey)	79–84	(Greece) Panathinaikos Superfoods	Istanbul
18:00 (CET)	Scoring by quarter: 24–18, 16–25, 24–25, 15–16
	Pts: Pleiß 15; Rebs: Schilb, Pleiß 5 Asts: Micov, Schilb 4 PIR: Schilb 21	Boxscore	Pts: James 18; Rebs: Singleton 5 Asts: N. Calathes 7 PIR: James 23	Arena: Abdi İpekçi Arena; Attendance: 8,091; Referees: Luigi Lamonica (ITA), Milivoje Jovčić (SRB), Anne Panther (GER)

3 February 2017	Baskonia (Spain)	71–79	(Spain) Real Madrid	Vitoria-Gasteiz
20:30 (CET)	Scoring by quarter: 15–16, 21–23, 16–20, 19–20
	Pts: Beaubois 20; Rebs: Voigtmann 13; Asts: Voigtmann 5 PIR: Voigtmann 21	Boxscore	Pts: Dončić, Taylor 16; Rebs: Dončić 9 Asts: Llull 8 PIR: Dončić 30	Arena: Fernando Buesa Arena; Attendance: 13,735; Referees: Sreten Radović (CRO), Matej Boltauzer (SLO), Ioannis Foufis (GRE)

3 February 2017	Crvena zvezda mts (Serbia)	72–86	(Turkey) Anadolu Efes	Belgrade
20:45 (CET)	Scoring by quarter: 20–16, 16–31, 16–14, 20–25
	Pts: Simonović 17; Rebs: Kuzmić 6 Asts: Jenkins 7 PIR: Simonović 17	Boxscore	Pts: Brown 20; Rebs: Brown 11; Asts: Heurtel 15; PIR: Brown 33	Arena: Aleksandar Nikolić; Attendance: 6,320; Referees: Damir Javor (SLO), Carmelo Paternicò (ITA), Clemens Fritz (GER)

=== Round 22 ===
9 February 2017	UNICS (Russia)	77–81	(Spain) Real Madrid	Kazan
17:00 (CET)	Scoring by quarter: 18–17, 18–26, 23–14, 18–24
	Pts: Langford 20; Rebs: Williams 6 Asts: Colom 9 PIR: Langford 25	Boxscore	Pts: Randolph 19; Rebs: Dončić 7 Asts: Dončić 11; PIR: Randolph 25	Arena: Basket Hall Kazan; Attendance: 4,731; Referees: Christos Christodoulou (GRE), Milivoje Jovčić (SRB), Tomislav Hordov (CRO)

9 February 2017	Anadolu Efes (Turkey)	90–86	(Italy) EA7 Emporio Armani Milan	Istanbul
18:30 (CET)	Scoring by quarter: 15–27, 25–27, 29–20, 21–12
	Pts: Heurtel 17; Rebs: Granger 6 Asts: Heurtel 6 PIR: Heurtel 21	Boxscore	Pts: Sanders 18; Rebs: McLean 6 Asts: Hickman, Simon 8 PIR: Hickman, Kalnietis 20	Arena: Abdi İpekçi Arena; Attendance: 5,284; Referees: Miguel Pérez Pérez (ESP), Jakub Zamojski (POL), Petri Mäntylä (FIN)

9 February 2017	CSKA Moscow (Russia)	102–80	(Serbia) Crvena zvezda mts	Moscow
19:00 (CET)	Scoring by quarter: 33–26, 25–20, 19–18, 25–16
	Pts: de Colo 25; Rebs: Augustine 6 Asts: de Colo, Jackson 6 PIR: Kurbanov 29	Boxscore	Pts: Mitrović 16; Rebs: Dobrić, Bjelica 3 Asts: Mitrović 9 PIR: Mitrović 26	Arena: Megasport Arena; Attendance: 9,042; Referees: Daniel Hierrezuelo (ESP), Emin Moğulkoç (TUR), Amit Balak (ISR)

9 February 2017	Maccabi Tel Aviv (Israel)	85–84	(Spain) Baskonia	Tel Aviv
20:05 (CET)	Scoring by quarter: 22–18, 24–21, 23–16, 16–29
	Pts: Goudelock 21; Rebs: Mekel 9 Asts: Mekel 7 PIR: Landesberg 19	Boxscore	Pts: Bargnani 17; Rebs: Voigtmann 11; Asts: Larkin 4 PIR: Voigtmann 26	Arena: Menora Mivtachim Arena; Attendance: 10,728; Referees: Ilija Belošević (SRB), Robert Lottermoser (GER), Mario Majkić (SLO)

9 February 2017	Panathinaikos Superfoods (Greece)	81–72	(Germany) Brose Bamberg	Athens
20:15 (CET)	Scoring by quarter: 27–19, 15–22, 20–13, 19–18
	Pts: Singleton 17; Rebs: Singleton 6 Asts: N. Calathes 5 PIR: Singleton 21	Boxscore	Pts: Theis 18; Rebs: Causeur 7 Asts: four players 4 PIR: Theis 18	Arena: Olympic Sports Center Athens; Attendance: 7,870; Referees: Borys Ryzhyk (UKR), Damir Javor (SLO), Oļegs Latiševs (LAT)

10 February 2017	Darüşşafaka Doğuş (Turkey)	72–65	(Turkey) Fenerbahçe	Istanbul
18:00 (CET)	Scoring by quarter: 10–20, 24–11, 13–16, 25–18
	Pts: Clyburn 20; Rebs: Žižić 10; Asts: Wanamaker 11; PIR: Žižić 25	Boxscore	Pts: Bogdanović 18; Rebs: Datome 9 Asts: Dixon 3 PIR: Bogdanović, Dixon 15	Arena: Volkswagen Arena; Attendance: 4,956; Referees: Sreten Radović (CRO), Matej Boltauzer (SLO), Carlos Peruga (ESP)

10 February 2017	Olympiacos (Greece)	73–64	(Lithuania) Žalgiris	Piraeus
20:00 (CET)	Scoring by quarter: 19–19, 16–16, 21–19, 17–10
	Pts: Printezis 17; Rebs: Printezis 10; Asts: Spanoulis, Mantzaris 3 PIR: Printezis 30	Boxscore	Pts: Lekavičius 11; Rebs: Lima 8 Asts: Lekavičius 5 PIR: Jankūnas 18	Arena: Peace and Friendship Stadium; Attendance: 8,335; Referees: Luigi Lamonica (ITA), Robert Lottermoser (GER), Sérgio Silva (POR)

10 February 2017	FC Barcelona Lassa (Spain)	62–69	(Turkey) Galatasaray Odeabank	Barcelona
21:00 (CET)	Scoring by quarter: 16–10, 12–16, 22–19, 12–24
	Pts: Vezenkov 18; Rebs: Perperoglou 12; Asts: Rice 7 PIR: Vezenkov, Koponen 15	Boxscore	Pts: Tyus 19; Rebs: Tyus, Schilb 9 Asts: Schilb 5 PIR: Tyus 28	Arena: Palau Blaugrana; Attendance: 4,585; Referees: Saša Pukl (SLO), Fernando Rocha (POR), Miloš Koljenšić (MNE)

=== Round 23 ===
23 February 2017	CSKA Moscow (Russia)	93–81	(Israel) Maccabi Tel Aviv	Moscow
18:00 (CET)	Scoring by quarter: 26–14, 28–34, 15–12, 24–21
	Pts: de Colo 29; Rebs: Hines 10; Asts: Teodosić 8 PIR: de Colo 35	Boxscore	Pts: Landesberg 19; Rebs: Smith 9 Asts: Mekel 7 PIR: Iverson 18	Arena: Megasport Arena; Attendance: 8,923; Referees: Sreten Radović (CRO), Milivoje Jovčić (SRB), Robert Vyklický (CZE)

23 February 2017	Fenerbahçe (Turkey)	67–64	(Greece) Olympiacos	Istanbul
18:45 (CET)	Scoring by quarter: 22–22, 18–12, 7–22, 20–8
	Pts: Bogdanović 27; Rebs: Dixon 7 Asts: Bogdanović 4 PIR: Bogdanović 29	Boxscore	Pts: Green 17; Rebs: Papanikolaou 8 Asts: Mantzaris 6 PIR: Papanikolaou 16	Arena: Fenerbahçe Ülker Sports Arena; Attendance: 12,439; Referees: Fernando Rocha (POR), Juan Carlos García González (ESP), Oļegs Latiševs (LAT)

23 February 2017	Crvena zvezda mts (Serbia)	77–58	(Turkey) Galatasaray Odeabank	Belgrade
19:00 (CET)	Scoring by quarter: 20–17, 28–12, 16–13, 13–16
	Pts: Lazić 17; Rebs: Kuzmić 8 Asts: Jović 8 PIR: Lazić, Kuzmić 23	Boxscore	Pts: Micov 11; Rebs: Arar 6 Asts: Preldžić, Pleiß 3 PIR: Micov 14	Arena: Aleksandar Nikolić; Attendance: 6,016; Referees: Emilio Pérez Pizarro (ESP), Jakub Zamojski (POL), Sérgio Silva (POR)

23 February 2017	EA7 Emporio Armani Milan (Italy)	78–83	(Spain) FC Barcelona Lassa	Assago
20:45 (CET)	Scoring by quarter: 22–22, 23–19, 10–24, 23–18
	Pts: Abass 14; Rebs: Cinciarini 5 Asts: Kalnietis 6 PIR: Cinciarini 17	Boxscore	Pts: Tomić 19; Rebs: Tomić 9 Asts: Rice 6 PIR: Tomić 24	Arena: Mediolanum Forum; Attendance: 9,688; Referees: Emin Moğulkoç (TUR), Piotr Pastusiak (POL), Seffi Shemmesh (ISR)

24 February 2017	Anadolu Efes (Turkey)	96–85	(Spain) Baskonia	Istanbul
18:00 (CET)	Scoring by quarter: 23–21, 24–17, 26–22, 23–25
	Pts: Heurtel 21; Rebs: Dunston 7 Asts: Heurtel 11; PIR: Dunston 30	Boxscore	Pts: Beaubois 23; Rebs: Voigtmann 13; Asts: Larkin 6 PIR: Hanga 28	Arena: Abdi İpekçi Arena; Attendance: 5,241; Referees: Luigi Lamonica (ITA), Saša Pukl (SLO), Tomasz Trawicki (POL)

24 February 2017	Brose Bamberg (Germany)	86–91	(Lithuania) Žalgiris	Bamberg
20:00 (CET)	Scoring by quarter: 22–28, 23–21, 23–18, 18–24
	Pts: Melli, Theis 17; Rebs: Radošević 7 Asts: Zisis 5 PIR: Theis 20	Boxscore	Pts: Lekavičius 29; Rebs: Jankūnas 6 Asts: Westermann 6 PIR: Lekavičius, Jankūnas 32	Arena: Brose Arena; Attendance: 6,150; Referees: Daniel Hierrezuelo (ESP), Spiros Gkontas (GRE), Mario Majkić (SLO)

24 February 2017	Panathinaikos Superfoods (Greece)	83–82	(Russia) UNICS	Athens
20:15 (CET)	Scoring by quarter: 24–25, 15–21, 13–15, 31–21
	Pts: Bourousis 15; Rebs: Singleton 8 Asts: Calathes 6 PIR: Bourousis 23	Boxscore	Pts: Langford 21; Rebs: Williams 9 Asts: Langford 7 PIR: Langford 27	Arena: Olympic Sports Center Athens; Attendance: 7,979; Referees: Robert Lottermoser (GER), Carlos Peruga (ESP), Uroš Obrknežević (SRB)

24 February 2017	Real Madrid (Spain)	101–83	(Turkey) Darüşşafaka Doğuş	Madrid
21:00 (CET)	Scoring by quarter: 30–14, 23–23, 22–23, 26–23
	Pts: Llull 26; Rebs: Fernández 6 Asts: Llull 8 PIR: Llull 31	Boxscore	Pts: Anderson 18; Rebs: Žižić 10; Asts: Bertāns 6 PIR: Anderson, Žižić 18	Arena: WiZink Center; Attendance: 10,751; Referees: Borys Ryzhyk (UKR), Damir Javor (SLO), Miloš Koljenšić (MNE)

=== Round 24 ===
2 March 2017	Žalgiris (Lithuania)	67–76	(Turkey) Fenerbahçe	Kaunas
18:00 (CET)	Scoring by quarter: 17–19, 14–11, 17–25, 19–21
	Pts: Jankūnas 15; Rebs: Jankūnas 7 Asts: Westermann 6 PIR: Jankūnas 23	Boxscore	Pts: Udoh 16; Rebs: Udoh 7 Asts: Dixon 9 PIR: Udoh 27	Arena: Žalgirio Arena; Attendance: 12,179; Referees: Saša Pukl (SLO), Emilio Pérez Pizarro (ESP), Petri Mäntylä (FIN)

2 March 2017	Galatasaray Odeabank (Turkey)	87–84	(Spain) Real Madrid	Istanbul
18:45 (CET)	Scoring by quarter: 25–20, 24–26, 24–14, 14–24
	Pts: Daye 20; Rebs: Pleiß 12; Asts: Güler 9 PIR: Pleiß 21	Boxscore	Pts: Randolph 16; Rebs: Dončić 8 Asts: Dončić 8 PIR: Dončić 26	Arena: Abdi İpekçi Arena; Attendance: 4,005; Referees: Luigi Lamonica (ITA), Petros Papapetrou (GRE), Marko Juras (SRB)

2 March 2017	Crvena zvezda mts (Serbia)	74–60	(Germany) Brose Bamberg	Belgrade
19:00 (CET)	Scoring by quarter: 17–9, 26–20, 13–14, 18–17
	Pts: Jenkins 18; Rebs: Simonović 9 Asts: Jenkins, Gudurić 4 PIR: Simonović 20	Boxscore	Pts: Causeur 21; Rebs: Melli 6 Asts: three players 3 PIR: Causeur 20	Arena: Aleksandar Nikolić; Attendance: 5,783; Referees: Christos Christodoulou (GRE), Carlos Peruga (ESP), Semen Ovinov (RUS)

2 March 2017	Maccabi Tel Aviv (Israel)	71–82	(Greece) Olympiacos	Tel Aviv
20:05 (CET)	Scoring by quarter: 13–17, 19–23, 13–18, 26–24
	Pts: Landesberg 17; Rebs: Rudd 6 Asts: Seeley 4 PIR: Landesberg 15	Boxscore	Pts: Green 16; Rebs: three players 6 Asts: Lojeski 4 PIR: Printezis 25	Arena: Menora Mivtachim Arena; Attendance: 10,728; Referees: Daniel Hierrezuelo (ESP), Matej Boltauzer (SLO), Clemens Fritz (GER)

2 March 2017	Baskonia (Spain)	87–74	(Italy) EA7 Emporio Armani Milan	Vitoria-Gasteiz
21:00 (CET)	Scoring by quarter: 23–20, 15–17, 28–16, 21–21
	Pts: Tillie 19; Rebs: Voigtmann 7 Asts: Larkin 11; PIR: Tillie 31	Boxscore	Pts: three players 11; Rebs: Mačvan 6 Asts: Hickman 8 PIR: Mačvan, Cinciarini 11	Arena: Fernando Buesa Arena; Attendance: 9,763; Referees: Borys Ryzhyk (UKR), Spiros Gkontas (GRE), Sérgio Silva (POR)

3 March 2017	UNICS (Russia)	92–99(OT)	(Turkey) Anadolu Efes	Kazan
17:00 (CET)	Scoring by quarter: 22–22, 21–27, 18–20, 21–13, Overtime: 10–17
	Pts: Langford 23; Rebs: Williams 10; Asts: Colom 5 PIR: Williams 21	Boxscore	Pts: Brown 24; Rebs: Honeycutt, Dunston 7 Asts: Heurtel 9 PIR: Brown 30	Arena: Basket Hall Kazan; Attendance: 3,846; Referees: Juan Carlos García González (ESP), Damir Javor (SLO), Anne Panther (GER)

3 March 2017	Darüşşafaka Doğuş (Turkey)	77–72	(Greece) Panathinaikos Superfoods	Istanbul
18:15 (CET)	Scoring by quarter: 17–17, 18–16, 18–20, 24–19
	Pts: Wanamaker 24; Rebs: Anderson 7 Asts: Wanamaker, Clyburn 3 PIR: Wanamaker 25	Boxscore	Pts: Singleton 23; Rebs: Bourousis 8 Asts: James 7 PIR: Singleton 30	Arena: Volkswagen Arena; Attendance: 4,856; Referees: Miguel Pérez Pérez (ESP), Carmelo Paternicò (ITA), Jurgis Laurinavičius (LTU)

3 March 2017	FC Barcelona Lassa (Spain)	61–85	(Russia) CSKA Moscow	Barcelona
21:00 (CET)	Scoring by quarter: 4–29, 20–19, 23–18, 14–19
	Pts: Vezenkov 14; Rebs: Diagne 5 Asts: Koponen 3 PIR: Vezenkov 21	Boxscore	Pts: de Colo 21; Rebs: Higgins 6 Asts: Jackson 6 PIR: de Colo 20	Arena: Palau Blaugrana; Attendance: 5,088; Referees: Robert Lottermoser (GER), Oļegs Latiševs (LAT), Mario Majkić (SLO)

=== Round 25 ===
9 March 2017	CSKA Moscow (Russia)	85–69	(Turkey) Galatasaray Odeabank	Moscow
18:00 (CET)	Scoring by quarter: 13–17, 33–12, 19–20, 20–20
	Pts: de Colo 22; Rebs: Hines 5 Asts: Teodosić 6 PIR: de Colo 26	Boxscore	Pts: Micov 18; Rebs: Daye, Pleiß 7 Asts: Güler 4 PIR: Micov 20	Arena: Megasport Arena; Attendance: 7,112; Referees: Damir Javor (SLO), Ilija Belošević (SRB), Tomasz Trawicki (POL)

9 March 2017	Fenerbahçe (Turkey)	74–79	(Spain) Baskonia	Istanbul
18:45 (CET)	Scoring by quarter: 18–19, 17–24, 20–18, 19–18
	Pts: Bogdanović 26; Rebs: Kalinić 5 Asts: Bogdanović 8 PIR: Bogdanović 26	Boxscore	Pts: Larkin 19; Rebs: Hanga, Shengelia 6 Asts: Luz 4 PIR: Larkin 18	Arena: Fenerbahçe Ülker Sports Arena; Attendance: 12,645; Referees: Christos Christodoulou (GRE), Carmelo Paternicò (ITA), Amit Balak (ISR)

9 March 2017	Žalgiris (Lithuania)	64–58	(Greece) Panathinaikos Superfoods	Kaunas
19:00 (CET)	Scoring by quarter: 9–17, 10–14, 15–10, 30–17
	Pts: Westermann 14; Rebs: Jankūnas 8 Asts: Pangos 9 PIR: Jankūnas, Westermann 19	Boxscore	Pts: Pappas 13; Rebs: Singleton 6 Asts: N. Calathes 5 PIR: Singleton 20	Arena: Žalgirio Arena; Attendance: 11,502; Referees: Fernando Rocha (POR), Emin Moğulkoç (TUR), Carlos Cortés (ESP)

9 March 2017	Maccabi Tel Aviv (Israel)	92–82	(Italy) EA7 Emporio Armani Milan	Tel Aviv
20:05 (CET)	Scoring by quarter: 26–20, 25–15, 19–26, 22–21
	Pts: Rudd 17; Rebs: Iverson 9 Asts: Mekel 8 PIR: Seeley, Iverson 22	Boxscore	Pts: Sanders 19; Rebs: three players 7 Asts: McLean 8 PIR: Hickman, Cinciarini 17	Arena: Menora Mivtachim Arena; Attendance: 10,728; Referees: Juan Carlos García González (ESP), Jakub Zamojski (POL), Rain Peerandi (EST)

9 March 2017	FC Barcelona Lassa (Spain)	70–62	(Russia) UNICS	Barcelona
21:00 (CET)	Scoring by quarter: 24–20, 12–14, 19–10, 15–18
	Pts: Perperoglou 13; Rebs: Faverani 6 Asts: Oleson, Rice 4 PIR: Claver 15	Boxscore	Pts: Antipov 12; Rebs: Clarke 5 Asts: Colom 8 PIR: Antipov 15	Arena: Palau Blaugrana; Attendance: 3,681; Referees: Saša Pukl (SLO), Tomislav Hordov (CRO), Renaud Geller (BEL)

10 March 2017	Anadolu Efes (Turkey)	68–87	(Germany) Brose Bamberg	Istanbul
18:00 (CET)	Scoring by quarter: 23–17, 9–25, 13–22, 23–23
	Pts: Osman 15; Rebs: Dunston 8 Asts: Heurtel 5 PIR: Osman 21	Boxscore	Pts: Melli, Radošević 16; Rebs: four players 6 Asts: Melli, Zisis 5 PIR: Melli 25	Arena: Abdi İpekçi Arena; Attendance: 4,726; Referees: Matej Boltauzer (SLO), Piotr Pastusiak (POL), Benjamín Jiménez (ESP)

10 March 2017	Olympiacos (Greece)	81–73	(Turkey) Darüşşafaka Doğuş	Piraeus
20:45 (CET)	Scoring by quarter: 25–18, 23–15, 21–25, 12–15
	Pts: Birch 13; Rebs: Birch 8 Asts: Spanoulis 8 PIR: Birch 19	Boxscore	Pts: Wanamaker 23; Rebs: Clyburn 7 Asts: Wanamaker 6 PIR: Wanamaker 29	Arena: Peace and Friendship Stadium; Attendance: 8,756; Referees: Sreten Radović (CRO), Emilio Pérez Pizarro (ESP), Mario Majkić (SLO)

10 March 2017	Real Madrid (Spain)	98–68	(Serbia) Crvena zvezda mts	Madrid
21:00 (CET)	Scoring by quarter: 38–24, 25–20, 17–13, 18–11
	Pts: three players 12; Rebs: Hunter 8 Asts: Llull 10; PIR: Ayón 25	Boxscore	Pts: Simonović 13; Rebs: Bjelica 8 Asts: Jenkins 5 PIR: Simonović 16	Arena: WiZink Center; Attendance: 10,247; Referees: Robert Lottermoser (GER), Spiros Gkontas (GRE), Marcin Kowalski (POL)

=== Round 26 ===
16 March 2017	Anadolu Efes (Turkey)	92–87	(Israel) Maccabi Tel Aviv	Istanbul
18:00 (CET)	Scoring by quarter: 17–17, 24–25, 26–15, 25–30
	Pts: Granger 22; Rebs: Dunston 12; Asts: Heurtel 8 PIR: Granger 26	Boxscore	Pts: Rudd 23; Rebs: Iverson 8 Asts: Mekel, Ohayon 8 PIR: Landesberg 17	Arena: Abdi İpekçi Arena; Attendance: 3,409; Referees: Christos Christodoulou (GRE), Luigi Lamonica (ITA), Miloš Koljenšić (MNE)

16 March 2017	Panathinaikos Superfoods (Greece)	88–82	(Spain) Real Madrid	Athens
20:15 (CET)	Scoring by quarter: 21–19, 22–22, 15–17, 30–24
	Pts: Singleton 21; Rebs: Singleton 9 Asts: Calathes 5 PIR: Singleton 23	Boxscore	Pts: Randolph 13; Rebs: Randolph 9 Asts: Llull 8 PIR: Hunter 16	Arena: Olympic Sports Center Athens; Attendance: 14,632; Referees: Ilija Belošević (SRB), Matej Boltauzer (SLO), Amit Balak (ISR)

16 March 2017	Brose Bamberg (Germany)	78–83	(Turkey) Fenerbahçe	Bamberg
20:45 (CET)	Scoring by quarter: 21–27, 17–15, 18–26, 22–15
	Pts: Causeur, Zisis 15; Rebs: Melli 8 Asts: three players 3 PIR: Zisis 18	Boxscore	Pts: Dixon 26; Rebs: Dixon, Veselý 6 Asts: Udoh, Nunnally 4 PIR: Dixon 26	Arena: Brose Arena; Attendance: 6,150; Referees: Sreten Radović (CRO), Ioannis Foufis (GRE), Carlos Cortés (ESP)

16 March 2017	EA7 Emporio Armani Milan (Italy)	71–78	(Serbia) Crvena zvezda mts	Assago
20:45 (CET)	Scoring by quarter: 10–25, 21–18, 19–17, 21–18
	Pts: Hickman 14; Rebs: Pascolo 7 Asts: Cinciarini 4 PIR: McLean 13	Boxscore	Pts: Kuzmić 15; Rebs: Kuzmić 7 Asts: Gudurić 5 PIR: Kuzmić 24	Arena: Mediolanum Forum; Attendance: 11,067; Referees: Daniel Hierrezuelo (ESP), Oļegs Latiševs (LAT), Clemens Fritz (GER)

17 March 2017	UNICS (Russia)	80–82	(Lithuania) Žalgiris	Kazan
17:00 (CET)	Scoring by quarter: 23–24, 20–18, 17–22, 20–18
	Pts: Langford 27; Rebs: Williams 6 Asts: Colom 10; PIR: Colom 25	Boxscore	Pts: Jankūnas 21; Rebs: Jankūnas 7 Asts: Lekavičius 5 PIR: Jankūnas 30	Arena: Basket Hall Kazan; Attendance: 3,611; Referees: Spiros Gkontas (GRE), Jakub Zamojski (POL), Josip Radojković (CRO)

17 March 2017	Darüşşafaka Doğuş (Turkey)	67–56	(Spain) FC Barcelona Lassa	Istanbul
18:00 (CET)	Scoring by quarter: 11–13, 32–9, 10–20, 14–14
	Pts: Clyburn 15; Rebs: Žižić 13; Asts: Wilbekin 5 PIR: Žižić 21	Boxscore	Pts: Perperoglou 16; Rebs: Tomić 9 Asts: Rice 4 PIR: Perperoglou 21	Arena: Volkswagen Arena; Attendance: 4,926; Referees: Damir Javor (SLO), Petri Mäntylä (FIN), Robert Vyklický (CZE)

17 March 2017	Olympiacos (Greece)	71–80	(Turkey) Galatasaray Odeabank	Piraeus
20:00 (CET)	Scoring by quarter: 27–14, 21–21, 11–22, 12–23
	Pts: Green, Printezis 14; Rebs: Printezis 8 Asts: Mantzaris 4 PIR: Printezis 18	Boxscore	Pts: Micov 18; Rebs: Arar 6 Asts: Güler 8 PIR: Micov, Tyus 23	Arena: Peace and Friendship Stadium; Attendance: 7,167; Referees: Milivoje Jovčić (SRB), Benjamín Jiménez (ESP), Tomislav Hordov (CRO)

17 March 2017	Baskonia (Spain)	79–78	(Russia) CSKA Moscow	Vitoria-Gasteiz
21:00 (CET)	Scoring by quarter: 18–14, 16–19, 27–21, 18–24
	Pts: Hanga 15; Rebs: Voigtmann 7 Asts: Beaubois, Shengelia 5 PIR: Shengelia 24	Boxscore	Pts: de Colo 22; Rebs: Hines 10; Asts: de Colo, Teodosić 6 PIR: de Colo 22	Arena: Fernando Buesa Arena; Attendance: 13,126; Referees: Saša Pukl (SLO), Piotr Pastusiak (POL), David Romano (ISR)

=== Round 27 ===
21 March 2017	Fenerbahçe (Turkey)	79–81	(Israel) Maccabi Tel Aviv	Istanbul
18:45 (CET)	Scoring by quarter: 25–15, 16–23, 18–18, 20–25
	Pts: Mahmutoğlu 15; Rebs: Udoh 10; Asts: Dixon 7 PIR: Udoh 20	Boxscore	Pts: Landesberg 22; Rebs: Simpson 12; Asts: Ohayon 6 PIR: Simpson 26	Arena: Fenerbahçe Ülker Sports Arena; Attendance: 12,174; Referees: Daniel Hierrezuelo (ESP), Matej Boltauzer (SLO), Jurgis Laurinavičius (LTU)

21 March 2017	Žalgiris (Lithuania)	68–76	(Turkey) Anadolu Efes	Kaunas
19:00 (CET)	Scoring by quarter: 22–17, 22–24, 15–19, 9–16
	Pts: Lekavičius 11; Rebs: Westermann 5 Asts: Westermann 8 PIR: Westermann 17	Boxscore	Pts: Granger 25; Rebs: Honeycutt 12; Asts: Granger 8 PIR: Granger 30	Arena: Žalgirio Arena; Attendance: 14,862; Referees: Borys Ryzhyk (UKR), Ioannis Foufis (GRE), Anne Panther (GER)

21 March 2017	Brose Bamberg (Germany)	71–96	(Spain) Baskonia	Bamberg
20:00 (CET)	Scoring by quarter: 11–28, 26–25, 16–21, 18–22
	Pts: McNeal 17; Rebs: three players 5 Asts: Nikolić 8 PIR: McNeal 18	Boxscore	Pts: Larkin, Budinger 17; Rebs: Shengelia 12; Asts: Larkin 6 PIR: Budinger 25	Arena: Brose Arena; Attendance: 6,150; Referees: Ilija Belošević (SRB), Tomislav Hordov (CRO), Oļegs Latiševs (LAT)

21 March 2017	Panathinaikos Superfoods (Greece)	74–61	(Italy) EA7 Emporio Armani Milan	Athens
20:15 (CET)	Scoring by quarter: 21–15, 17–10, 19–15, 17–21
	Pts: N. Calathes, James 13; Rebs: Gabriel 8 Asts: N. Calathes 4 PIR: N. Calathes 13	Boxscore	Pts: Abass 15; Rebs: Cinciarini 8 Asts: Mačvan, Cinciarini 4 PIR: Cinciarini 20	Arena: Olympic Sports Center Athens; Attendance: 6,195; Referees: Miguel Pérez Pérez (ESP), Seffi Shemmesh (ISR), Sérgio Silva (POR)

22 March 2017	CSKA Moscow (Russia)	95–85	(Turkey) Darüşşafaka Doğuş	Moscow
17:00 (CET)	Scoring by quarter: 24–19, 23–16, 21–27, 27–23
	Pts: Teodosić 20; Rebs: Hines, Khryapa 8 Asts: Teodosić 10; PIR: Teodosić 29	Boxscore	Pts: Wilbekin 26; Rebs: Aldemir 10; Asts: Wanamaker 6 PIR: Wilbekin 22	Arena: Megasport Arena; Attendance: 7,011; Referees: Christos Christodoulou (GRE), Milivoje Jovčić (SRB), Benjamín Jiménez (ESP)

22 March 2017	Galatasaray Odeabank (Turkey)	75–67	(Russia) UNICS	Istanbul
19:00 (CET)	Scoring by quarter: 21–23, 24–6, 12–12, 18–26
	Pts: Diebler 17; Rebs: Schilb 7 Asts: Güler 8 PIR: Diebler 20	Boxscore	Pts: Langford 24; Rebs: Williams 8 Asts: Colom 6 PIR: Langford 25	Arena: Abdi İpekçi Arena; Attendance: 2,019; Referees: Fernando Rocha (POR), Emilio Pérez Pizarro (ESP), Nick Van den Broeck (BEL)

22 March 2017	Crvena zvezda mts (Serbia)	64–66(OT)	(Greece) Olympiacos	Belgrade
19:00 (CET)	Scoring by quarter: 9–17, 8–13, 26–12, 15–16, Overtime: 6–8
	Pts: Gudurić 14; Rebs: Kuzmić 8 Asts: Gudurić 3 PIR: Jenkins 16	Boxscore	Pts: Papanikolaou 17; Rebs: Papanikolaou 9 Asts: Mantzaris 5 PIR: Papanikolaou 26	Arena: Kombank Arena; Attendance: 18,170; Referees: Damir Javor (SLO), Juan Carlos García González (ESP), Amit Balak (ISR)

22 March 2017	Real Madrid (Spain)	85–69	(Spain) FC Barcelona Lassa	Madrid
21:00 (CET)	Scoring by quarter: 22–13, 19–14, 23–24, 21–18
	Pts: Llull 21; Rebs: Dončić 6 Asts: Llull 6 PIR: Llull 32	Boxscore	Pts: Tomić, Rice 12; Rebs: Tomić 10; Asts: Rice 4 PIR: Tomić 16	Arena: WiZink Center; Attendance: 11,759; Referees: Luigi Lamonica (ITA), Emin Moğulkoç (TUR), Miloš Koljenšić (MNE)

=== Round 28 ===
23 March 2017	Anadolu Efes (Turkey)	80–77	(Turkey) Fenerbahçe	Istanbul
18:30 (CET)	Scoring by quarter: 21–14, 23–21, 21–19, 15–23
	Pts: Dunston 14; Rebs: three players 4 Asts: Granger 5 PIR: Balbay, Granger 14	Boxscore	Pts: Dixon 19; Rebs: Udoh 10; Asts: Bogdanović 4 PIR: Dixon 27	Arena: Abdi İpekçi Arena; Attendance: 7,979; Referees: Spiros Gkontas (GRE), Emilio Pérez Pizarro (ESP), Seffi Shemmesh (ISR)

23 March 2017	Maccabi Tel Aviv (Israel)	77–93	(Lithuania) Žalgiris	Tel Aviv
20:05 (CET)	Scoring by quarter: 14–17, 19–27, 25–27, 19–22
	Pts: Rudd 16; Rebs: Iverson 6 Asts: Smith 5 PIR: Rudd 18	Boxscore	Pts: Ulanovas 20; Rebs: Jankūnas, Kavaliauskas 7 Asts: Westermann 8 PIR: Jankūnas 21	Arena: Menora Mivtachim Arena; Attendance: 10,728; Referees: Saša Pukl (SLO), Carlos Peruga (ESP), Rain Peerandi (EST)

23 March 2017	EA7 Emporio Armani Milan (Italy)	76–84	(Germany) Brose Bamberg	Assago
20:45 (CET)	Scoring by quarter: 14–29, 22–21, 16–14, 24–20
	Pts: Hickman 20; Rebs: Raduljica 9 Asts: Hickman, Kalnietis 4 PIR: Raduljica 27	Boxscore	Pts: Causeur 17; Rebs: Causeur, Melli 8 Asts: Zisis 7 PIR: Causeur 23	Arena: Mediolanum Forum; Attendance: 8,082; Referees: Borys Ryzhyk (UKR), Sašo Petek (SLO), Petros Papapetrou (GRE)

23 March 2017	Baskonia (Spain)	63–72	(Greece) Panathinaikos Superfoods	Vitoria-Gasteiz
21:00 (CET)	Scoring by quarter: 6–24, 15–13, 16–17, 26–18
	Pts: Hanga 13; Rebs: Voigtmann 7 Asts: Laprovíttola 5 PIR: Voigtmann 18	Boxscore	Pts: Singleton 18; Rebs: Singleton 8 Asts: N. Calathes 8 PIR: Singleton 22	Arena: Fernando Buesa Arena; Attendance: 12,239; Referees: Carmelo Paternicò (ITA), Petri Mäntylä (FIN), Uroš Obrknežević (SRB)

24 March 2017	UNICS (Russia)	74–85	(Russia) CSKA Moscow	Kazan
17:00 (CET)	Scoring by quarter: 18–25, 15–19, 24–30, 17–11
	Pts: Langford 17; Rebs: Parakhouski 8 Asts: Ponkrashov 7 PIR: Parakhouski 23	Boxscore	Pts: de Colo 22; Rebs: Augustine, Kurbanov 7 Asts: Teodosić 12; PIR: de Colo 29	Arena: Basket Hall Kazan; Attendance: 3,956; Referees: Damir Javor (SLO), Oļegs Latiševs (LAT), Marko Juras (SRB)

24 March 2017	Darüşşafaka Doğuş (Turkey)	73–67	(Turkey) Galatasaray Odeabank	Istanbul
18:15 (CET)	Scoring by quarter: 16–18, 21–21, 24–13, 12–15
	Pts: Wanamaker 22; Rebs: Clyburn 9 Asts: three players 3 PIR: Wanamaker 25	Boxscore	Pts: Micov 17; Rebs: Pleiß 9 Asts: Güler 5 PIR: Pleiß 20	Arena: Volkswagen Arena; Attendance: 4,623; Referees: Juan Carlos García González (ESP), Ioannis Foufis (GRE), Aare Halliko (EST)

24 March 2017	Olympiacos (Greece)	73–79	(Spain) Real Madrid	Piraeus
20:00 (CET)	Scoring by quarter: 20–19, 17–18, 17–21, 19–21
	Pts: Milutinov 18; Rebs: Papanikolaou 6 Asts: Spanoulis, Mantzaris 3 PIR: Milutinov 24	Boxscore	Pts: Randolph, Llull 21; Rebs: Randolph 5 Asts: Llull 5 PIR: Randolph 30	Arena: Peace and Friendship Stadium; Attendance: 11,039; Referees: Sreten Radović (CRO), Fernando Rocha (POR), David Romano (ISR)

24 March 2017	FC Barcelona Lassa (Spain)	67–54	(Serbia) Crvena zvezda mts	Barcelona
21:00 (CET)	Scoring by quarter: 17–18, 15–11, 20–14, 15–11
	Pts: Perperoglou 17; Rebs: Claver 10; Asts: three players 3 PIR: Perperoglou 21	Boxscore	Pts: three players 8 Rebs: Simonović 8 Asts: Simonović 3 PIR: Simonović 14	Arena: Palau Blaugrana; Attendance: 3,629; Referees: Christos Christodoulou (GRE), Piotr Pastusiak (POL), Sérgio Silva (POR)

=== Round 29 ===
30 March 2017	Anadolu Efes (Turkey)	77–69	(Greece) Olympiacos	Istanbul
19:00 (CEST)	Scoring by quarter: 22–15, 21–21, 15–14, 19–19
	Pts: Heurtel 18; Rebs: Honeycutt 11; Asts: Honeycutt 6 PIR: Honeycutt 25	Boxscore	Pts: Printezis 16; Rebs: Printezis 9 Asts: Spanoulis 10; PIR: Printezis 25	Arena: Abdi İpekçi Arena; Attendance: 5,804; Referees: Matej Boltauzer (SLO), Piotr Pastusiak (POL), Carlos Peruga (ESP)

30 March 2017	Brose Bamberg (Germany)	97–99(OT)	(Turkey) Darüşşafaka Doğuş	Bamberg
20:45 (CEST)	Scoring by quarter: 22–14, 18–15, 18–26, 26–29, Overtime: 13–15
	Pts: Causeur 15; Rebs: Melli 10; Asts: Zisis 11; PIR: Theis 23	Boxscore	Pts: Wanamaker 30; Rebs: Moerman 12; Asts: Wanamaker 6 PIR: Wanamaker 34	Arena: Brose Arena; Attendance: 6,150; Referees: Daniel Hierrezuelo (ESP), Petri Mäntylä (FIN), Sérgio Silva (POR)

30 March 2017	FC Barcelona Lassa (Spain)	76–71	(Israel) Maccabi Tel Aviv	Barcelona
21:00 (CEST)	Scoring by quarter: 23–13, 17–19, 18–22, 18–17
	Pts: Tomić 15; Rebs: Tomić 6 Asts: Tomić 6 PIR: Tomić 23	Boxscore	Pts: Mekel 18; Rebs: Simpson 12; Asts: Mekel 7 PIR: Mekel 22	Arena: Palau Blaugrana; Attendance: 3,037; Referees: Sreten Radović (CRO), Elias Koromilas (GRE), Uroš Obrknežević

31 March 2017	Galatasaray Odeabank (Turkey)	80–103	(Spain) Baskonia	Istanbul
19:00 (CEST)	Scoring by quarter: 21–27, 23–33, 22–20, 14–23
	Pts: Tyus, Diebler 14; Rebs: Tyus 8 Asts: Güler 9 PIR: Tyus 23	Boxscore	Pts: Tillie 20; Rebs: Budinger 7 Asts: Larkin, Hanga 7 PIR: Tillie 24	Arena: Abdi İpekçi Arena; Attendance: 2,359; Referees: Milivoje Jovčić (SRB), Matej Boltauzer (SLO), Rain Peerandi (EST)

31 March 2017	Crvena zvezda mts (Serbia)	83–65	(Russia) UNICS	Belgrade
19:00 (CEST)	Scoring by quarter: 10–14, 30–17, 17–18, 26–16
	Pts: Bjelica 19; Rebs: Mitrović 5 Asts: Wolters 6 PIR: Bjelica 22	Boxscore	Pts: Langford 16; Rebs: Parakhouski, Banić 6 Asts: Colom 6 PIR: Colom 19	Arena: Kombank Arena; Attendance: 9,332; Referees: Borys Ryzhyk (UKR), Petros Papapetrou (GRE), Aare Halliko (EST)

31 March 2017	Žalgiris (Lithuania)	84–88	(Italy) EA7 Emporio Armani Milan	Kaunas
19:00 (CEST)	Scoring by quarter: 27–18, 14–21, 22–24, 21–25
	Pts: Pangos 16; Rebs: Jankūnas 8 Asts: Lekavičius, Westermann 7 PIR: Jankūnas 20	Boxscore	Pts: McLean, Cinciarini 17; Rebs: Mačvan, Abass 5 Asts: Mačvan 5 PIR: Abass 22	Arena: Žalgirio Arena; Attendance: 15,231; Referees: Benjamín Jiménez (ESP), Jakub Zamojski (POL), Mario Majkić (SLO)

31 March 2017	Panathinaikos Superfoods (Greece)	85–80(OT)	(Russia) CSKA Moscow	Athens
20:45 (CEST)	Scoring by quarter: 20–17, 25–23, 13–15, 15–18, Overtime: 12–7
	Pts: Rivers 17; Rebs: Gist, Bourousis 7 Asts: N. Calathes 6 PIR: Rivers 18	Boxscore	Pts: de Colo, Teodosić 15; Rebs: Khryapa 9 Asts: de Colo 5 PIR: Teodosić, Augustine 18	Arena: Olympic Sports Center Athens; Attendance: 17,704; Referees: Fernando Rocha (POR), Emilio Pérez Pizarro (ESP), Emin Moğulkoç (TUR)

31 March 2017	Real Madrid (Spain)	61–56	(Turkey) Fenerbahçe	Madrid
21:00 (CEST)	Scoring by quarter: 20–16, 9–16, 19–11, 13–13
	Pts: Llull 16; Rebs: Ayón 8 Asts: Ayón 3 PIR: Ayón, Llull 11	Boxscore	Pts: Bogdanović 15; Rebs: Veselý 7 Asts: Dixon 3 PIR: Veselý 18	Arena: WiZink Center; Attendance: 10,827; Referees: Christos Christodoulou (GRE), Saša Pukl (SLO), Amit Balak (ISR)

=== Round 30 ===
6 April 2017	Fenerbahçe (Turkey)	68–65(OT)	(Spain) FC Barcelona Lassa	Istanbul
19:45 (CEST)	Scoring by quarter: 11–15, 19–16, 14–15, 14–12, Overtime: 10–7
	Pts: Bogdanović 15; Rebs: Udoh 15; Asts: Sloukas 5 PIR: Udoh 27	Boxscore	Pts: Rice 19; Rebs: Tomić, Claver 7 Asts: Tomić, Perperoglou 4 PIR: Claver 18	Arena: Fenerbahçe Ülker Sports Arena; Attendance: 11,790; Referees: Fernando Rocha (POR), Ioannis Foufis (GRE), Tomislav Hodrov (CRO)

6 April 2017	Brose Bamberg (Germany)	79–84	(Turkey) Galatasaray Odeabank	Bamberg
20:00 (CEST)	Scoring by quarter: 23–20, 22–23, 18–15, 16–26
	Pts: Melli 17; Rebs: Causeur, Zisis, Lô 4 Asts: Zisis, Lô 4 PIR: Melli 15	Boxscore	Pts: Güler 17; Rebs: Tyus 5 Asts: Preldžić 6 PIR: Schilb 20	Arena: Brose Arena; Attendance: 6,150; Referees: Emilio Pérez Pizarro (ESP), David Romano (ISR), Marko Juras (SRB)

6 April 2017	Maccabi Tel Aviv (Israel)	61–81	(Greece) Panathinaikos Superfoods	Tel Aviv
20:05 (CEST)	Scoring by quarter: 26–20, 16–12, 12–31, 7–18
	Pts: Rudd 17; Rebs: Mekel 7 Asts: Mekel 9 PIR: Alexander, Iverson 11	Boxscore	Pts: James 17; Rebs: Singleton 8 Asts: James 7 PIR: Singleton 26	Arena: Menora Mivtachim Arena; Attendance: 8,480; Referees: Daniel Hierrezuelo (ESP), Piotr Pastusiak (POL), Clemens Fritz (GER)

6 April 2017	Baskonia (Spain)	79–84	(Lithuania) Žalgiris	Vitoria-Gasteiz
21:00 (CEST)	Scoring by quarter: 16–21, 24–20, 16–27, 23–16
	Pts: Larkin 20; Rebs: Tillie 7 Asts: Larkin 6 PIR: Larkin 25	Boxscore	Pts: Pangos 15; Rebs: Motum 6 Asts: Westermann 9 PIR: Pangos 22	Arena: Fernando Buesa Arena; Attendance: 10,437; Referees: Damir Javor (SLO), Emin Moğulkoç (TUR), Sérgio Silva (POR)

7 April 2017	CSKA Moscow (Russia)	90–86	(Greece) Olympiacos	Moscow
19:00 (CEST)	Scoring by quarter: 25–15, 22–22, 24–26, 19–23
	Pts: de Colo, Teodosić 23; Rebs: Hines 6 Asts: de Colo 6 PIR: de Colo 31	Boxscore	Pts: Papapetrou, Spanoulis 16; Rebs: Printezis 7 Asts: Spanoulis 7 PIR: Printezis 17	Arena: Megasport Arena; Attendance: 11,077; Referees: Ilija Belošević (SRB), Carmelo Paternicò (ITA), Benjamin Jimenez (ESP)

7 April 2017	Darüşşafaka Doğuş (Turkey)	78–62	(Serbia) Crvena zvezda mts	Istanbul
19:00 (CEST)	Scoring by quarter: 25–14, 18–18, 12–17, 23–13
	Pts: Wanamaker 22; Rebs: Žižić 8 Asts: Wilbekin 6 PIR: Wanamaker 25	Boxscore	Pts: Kuzmić 14; Rebs: Kuzmić 6 Asts: Gudurić 3 PIR: Kuzmić 12	Arena: Volkswagen Arena; Attendance: 4,982; Referees: Miguel Pérez Pérez (ESP), Oļegs Latiševs (LAT), Seffi Shemmesh (ISR)

7 April 2017	EA7 Emporio Armani Milan (Italy)	68–91	(Russia) UNICS	Assago
20:45 (CEST)	Scoring by quarter: 21–22, 18–14, 10–29, 19–26
	Pts: Pascolo 18; Rebs: Simon 5 Asts: Cinciarini 6 PIR: Pascolo 15	Boxscore	Pts: Williams 20; Rebs: Williams 12; Asts: Colom 6 PIR: Williams 34	Arena: Mediolanum Forum; Attendance: 7,460; Referees: Saša Pukl (SLO), Carlos Peruga (ESP), Anne Panther (GER)

7 April 2017	Real Madrid (Spain)	97–80	(Turkey) Anadolu Efes	Madrid
21:00 (CEST)	Scoring by quarter: 16–21, 21–15, 25–24, 35–20
	Pts: Carroll 29; Rebs: Ayón, Hunter 7 Asts: Dončić 11; PIR: Carroll 29	Boxscore	Pts: Dunston 15; Rebs: Dunston 10; Asts: Heurtel 6 PIR: Dunston 22	Arena: WiZink Center; Attendance: 8,894; Referees: Robert Lottermoser (GER), Milivoje Jovčić (SRB), Petri Mäntylä (FIN)
