= 2016–17 Fenerbahçe S.K. (basketball) season =

Fenerbahçe
2016–17 season
- Chairman: (Turkey) Aziz Yıldırım
- Head coach: (Serbia) Željko Obradović
- Arena: Ülker Sports Arena
- Basketball Super League: 1st seed
- Playoffs: Champions
- EuroLeague: 5th seed
- Playoffs: Champions
- Turkish Cup: Quarterfinalist
- Presidential Cup: Champions
- PIR leader: (Czech Republic) Veselý 16.4
- Scoring leader: (Serbia) Bogdanović 15.1
- Rebounding leader: (Canada) Bennett 6.4
- Assists leader: (Greece) Sloukas 4.5
Home	Away

The 2016–17 season was Fenerbahçe's 103rd season in the existence of the club. The team played in the TBL and in the Euroleague.

== Players ==
=== Squad information ===
Fenerbahçe roster
Players
Coaches

Pos.	No.	Nat.	Name	Ht.	Wt.	Age
PG	23	(Turkey)	Uğurlu, Berk	1.92 m (6 ft 4 in)	87 kg (192 lb)	21 – 27 April 1996
PG	35	(Turkey)	Dixon, Bobby (DC)	1.78 m (5 ft 10 in)	73 kg (161 lb)	34 – 10 April 1983
G	16	(Greece)	Sloukas, Kostas	1.90 m (6 ft 3 in)	95 kg (209 lb)	27 – 15 January 1990
PG	10	(Turkey)	Mahmutoğlu, Melih (C)	1.91 m (6 ft 3 in)	85 kg (187 lb)	27 – 12 May 1990
G	13	(Serbia)	Bogdanović, Bogdan	1.98 m (6 ft 6 in)	93 kg (205 lb)	24 – 18 August 1992
G/F	18	(Turkey)	Arna, Egehan	2.03 m (6 ft 8 in)	93 kg (205 lb)	20 – 5 January 1997
G/F	21	(United States)	Nunnally, James	2.01 m (6 ft 7 in)	90 kg (198 lb)	26 – 14 July 1990
SF	33	(Serbia)	Kalinić, Nikola	2.03 m (6 ft 8 in)	101 kg (223 lb)	25 – 8 November 1991
SF	70	(Italy)	Datome, Luigi	2.03 m (6 ft 8 in)	98 kg (216 lb)	29 – 27 November 1987
PF	5	(Turkey)	Hersek, Barış	2.08 m (6 ft 10 in)	104 kg (229 lb)	29 – 26 March 1988
F/C	12	(North Macedonia)	Antić, Pero	2.11 m (6 ft 11 in)	118 kg (260 lb)	34 – 29 July 1982
F/C	24	(Czech Republic)	Veselý, Jan	2.13 m (7 ft 0 in)	110 kg (243 lb)	27 – 24 April 1990
F/C	8	(United States)	Udoh, Ekpe	2.08 m (6 ft 10 in)	111 kg (245 lb)	30 – 20 May 1987
PF	9	(Turkey)	Duran, Ahmet Can	2.06 m (6 ft 9 in)	118 kg (260 lb)	18 – 28 January 1999
F/C	44	(Turkey)	Düverioğlu, Ahmet (DC)	2.10 m (6 ft 11 in)	121 kg (267 lb)	24 – 4 March 1993

Head coach

- (Serbia) Željko Obradović

Assistant coach(es)

- (Spain) Josep Maria Izquierdo
- (Serbia) Vladimir Androić
- (Turkey) Erdem Can
- (Turkey) Berkay Oğuz

Athletic trainer(s)

- (Serbia) Predrag Zimonjić
- (Turkey) İlker Belgutay

Physiotherapist(s)

- (Turkey) Sefa Öztürk

Team manager

- (Italy) Maurizio Gherardini
- (Turkey) Cenk Renda

Legend

- (C) Team captain
- Injured

- Roster
Updated: June 14, 2017

=== Players In ===
No.	Pos.	Nat.	Name	Age	Moving from		Type	Ends	Transfer fee	Date	Source
14	C	(Turkey)	Ahmet Düverioğlu	23	Anadolu Efes	(Turkey)	Free agent	3	–	July 28, 2016	
21	SF	(United States)	James Nunnally	26	Sidigas Avellino	(Italy)	Free agent	1+1	–	July 28, 2016	
22	SF	(Bulgaria)	Yordan Minchev	18	Levski Sofia	(Bulgaria)	Free agent	5	–	November 2, 2016	
15	F	(Canada)	Anthony Bennett	23	Brooklyn Nets	(United States)	Free agent	1+1	–	January 13, 2017	

Total spending: ▼€0

=== Players Out ===
No.	Pos.	Nat.	Name	Age	Moving to		Type	Transfer fee	Date	Source
17	C	(Turkey)	Ayberk Olmaz	19	TED Ankara Kolejliler	(Turkey)	Loan (3 years)	–	August 29, 2014	
14	C	(Turkey)	Ömer Yurtseven	18	NC State Wolfpack	(United States)	Leave for NCAA	–	May 16, 2016	
3	G	(Georgia (country))	Ricky Hickman	30	Olimpia Milano	(Italy)	Expired contract	–	July 26, 2016	
25	PG	(Turkey)	Kenan Sipahi	21	Beşiktaş Sompo Japan	(Turkey)	Opt-out clause on contract	–	July 1, 2016	
22	G/F	(Bulgaria)	Yordan Minchev	18	Vršac	(Serbia)	Loan (1 year)	–	February 14, 2017	

Source: Eurobasket.com

Total income: ▲€0

Total expenditure: ▼€0

== Technical Staff ==
- General Manager (Italy) Maurizio Gherardini
- Team Manager (Turkey) Cenk Renda
- Head coach (Serbia) Željko Obradović
- Assistant coach (Spain) Josep Maria Izquierdo
- Assistant coach (Serbia) Vladimir Androić
- Assistant coach (Turkey) Erdem Can
- Assistant coach (Turkey) Berkay Oğuz
- Conditioning coach (Serbia) Predrag Zimonjić
- Conditioning coach (Turkey) İlker Belgutay
- Physiotherapist (Turkey) Sefa Öztürk

== Kit ==
- Supplier: Nike
- Main sponsor: metro
- Back sponsor: QNB Finansbank
- Short sponsor:

Home	Away

== Pre-season and friendlies ==
15 September 2016 VI Torneo Costa del Sol	Unicaja (Spain)	104–112(OT)	(Turkey) Fenerbahçe	Málaga, Spain
21:00 (FET)	Scoring by quarter: 18–14, 21–24, 23–21, 22–25, Overtime: 20–28
	Pts: Fogg 37; Rebs: Brooks, Garcia, Musli 8 Asts: Lafayette 7 PIR: Fogg 32	Report	Pts: Dixon 19; Rebs: Udoh 12; Asts: Sloukas 7 PIR: Veselý 20	Arena: Polideportivo Municipal Alhaurín el Grande; Attendance: 1000; Referees: Germán Morales; Mariano Palomo; Alberto Sánchez

16 September 2016 VI Torneo Costa del Sol	Real Madrid (Spain)	87–90	(Turkey) Fenerbahçe	Málaga, Spain
21:00 (FET)	Scoring by quarter: 20–22, 25–25, 13–27, 29–16
	Pts: Dončić 19; Rebs: Ayón 8 Asts: Dončić 4 PIR: Dončić 22	Report	Pts: Dixon 22; Rebs: Udoh 8 Asts: Sloukas 7 PIR: Dixon 27	Arena: Pabellón Municipal de Cártama; Attendance: 1500; Referees: Germán Morales; Jorge Muñoz; Enrique López

Fenerbahçe finished the tournament as champions

18 September 2016	Joventut Badalona (Spain)	87–83	(Turkey) Fenerbahçe	Badalona, Spain
21:00 (FET)	Scoring by quarter: 15–16, 16–27, 23–23, 33–17
	Pts: Stutz 20; Rebs: Stutz 11; Asts: Sàbat, Vidal 5 PIR: Stutz 26	Report	Pts: Kalinić 15; Rebs: Veselý 6 Asts: Sloukas 6 PIR: Veselý 22	Arena: Palau Municipal d'Esports de Badalona; Referees: J.A. Martín Bertran (ESP); J. Aliaga (ESP); V. Mas (ESP)

22 September 2016 Zadar Doğuş Tourn. 2016	Fenerbahçe (Turkey)	88–67	(Russia) Lokomotiv Kuban	Zadar, Croatia
21:30 (FET)	Scoring by quarter: 29–20, 24–17, 23–17, 12–13
	Pts: Veselý 15; Rebs: Egehan, Udoh, Veselý 5 Asts: Udoh 8 PIR: Udoh 26	Report	Pts: Jones 18; Rebs: Jones 5 Asts: Broekhoff, Janning 3 PIR: Jones 19	Arena: Krešimir Ćosić Hall; Referees: Saša Pukl (SLO); Tomislav Hordov (CRO); Josip Radojkovic (CRO)

24 September 2016 Zadar Doğuş Tourn. 2016	Cedevita Zagreb (Croatia)	77–88	(Turkey) Fenerbahçe	Zadar, Croatia
21:30 (FET)	Scoring by quarter: 18–25, 25–16, 10–21, 24–26
	Pts: Begić 18; Rebs: Arapović, Begić 6 Asts: Babić 5 PIR: Begić 27	Report	Pts: Melih, Nunnally 18; Rebs: Egehan, Udoh 5 Asts: Sloukas 7 PIR: Nunnally 25	Arena: Krešimir Ćosić Hall; Referees: Zdravko Rutesic (MNE); Alfred Jovovic (CRO); Ante Cankovic (CRO)

25 September 2016 Zadar Doğuş Tourn. 2016	Fenerbahçe (Turkey)	65–75	(Turkey) Darüşşafaka Doğuş	Zadar, Croatia
22:00 (FET)	Scoring by quarter: 14–16, 16–24, 17–16, 18–19
	Pts: Udoh 19; Rebs: Udoh 11; Asts: Dixon, Melih 3 PIR: Udoh 23	Report	Pts: Wanamaker 14; Rebs: Furkan 11; Asts: Wilbekin 8 PIR: Furkan 19	Arena: Krešimir Ćosić Hall; Referees: Srdan Dozai (CRO); Tomislav Vovk (CRO); Luka Kardum (CRO)

Fenerbahçe finished the tournament as runners-up

30 September 2016	Rabotnički (North Macedonia)	60–92	(Turkey) Fenerbahçe	Skopje, Macedonia
20:00 (FET)	Scoring by quarter: 11–27, 13–21, 21–22, 15–22
	Pts: Datome 14	Report		Arena: Boris Trajkovski Sports Center

== Competitions ==
=== Overall ===
Competition	Started round	Final position / round	First match	Last match
Turkish Basketball President's Cup	Final	Champions	5 October 2016	
Turkish Basketball Super League	Matchday 1	Champions	9 October 2016	16 June 2017
2016–17 Turkish Cup Basketball	Quarterfinals	Quarterfinalist	15 February 2017	
EuroLeague	Matchday 1	Champions	14 October 2016	21 May 2017

Source: Competitions

=== Overview ===
Competition	Record							
Competition	Pld	W	D	L	PF	PA	PD	Win %
Turkish Basketball President's Cup	1	1	0	0	77	69	+8	100.00
Turkish Basketball Super League	30	28	0	2	2,546	2,182	+364	93.33
TBSL Playoffs	9	9	0	0	792	693	+99	100.00
Turkish Cup	1	0	0	1	74	82	−8	0.00
EuroLeague	35	23	0	12	2,650	2,566	+84	65.71
Total	76	61	0	15	6,139	5,592	+547	80.26

Last updated: 16 June 2017
Source: Competitions

=== Turkish Basketball President's Cup ===
5 October 2016	Fenerbahçe	77–69	Anadolu Efes	Ankara
20:00 (FET)	Scoring by quarter: 15–9, 24–18, 25–29, 13–13
	Pts: Dixon 19; Rebs: Udoh 9 Asts: Sloukas 7	Report	Pts: Granger 15; Rebs: Honeycutt 11; Asts: Granger 7	Arena: Ankara Arena; Referees: Emin Moğulkoç; Altuğ Köselerli; Mehmet Serdar Ünal

=== Turkish Basketball Super League ===
==== League table ====
Pos	Team	Pld	W	L	PF	PA	PD	Pts	Qualification or relegation
1	Fenerbahçe	30	28	2	2546	2182	+364	58	Advance to Playoffs
2	Beşiktaş Sompo Japan	30	24	6	2487	2197	+290	54	Advance to Playoffs
3	Anadolu Efes	30	23	7	2560	2269	+291	53	Advance to Playoffs
4	Darüşşafaka Doğuş	30	23	7	2504	2249	+255	53	Advance to Playoffs
5	Banvit	30	21	9	2504	2319	+185	51	Advance to Playoffs

Updated to match(es) played on 16 May 2017. Source: TBL

Win Loss

===== Regular season =====
9 October 2016 1	Muratbey Uşak Sportif	71–70	Fenerbahçe	Uşak
15:00 (FET)	Scoring by quarter: 17–17, 23–16, 18–18, 13–19
		Report		Arena: Uşak Üniversitesi Sport Hall

17 October 2016 2	Fenerbahçe	76–62	İstanbul BB	Istanbul
21:00 (FET)	Scoring by quarter: 21–9, 19–15, 17–18, 19–20
		Report		Arena: Ülker Sports Arena

23 October 2016 3	Yeşilgiresun Belediye	61–72	Fenerbahçe	Giresun
19:00 (FET)	Scoring by quarter: 18-18, 19-20, 11-16, 13-18
		Report		Arena: 19 Eylül Sports Hall

30 October 2016 4	Fenerbahçe	84–75	Pınar Karşıyaka	Istanbul
13:00 (FET)	Scoring by quarter: 19-21, 17-18, 24–17, 24–19
		Report		Arena: Ülker Sports Arena

7 November 2016 5	Darüşşafaka Doğuş	78–79	Fenerbahçe	Istanbul
21:00 (FET)	Scoring by quarter: 22-23, 22-21, 16-19, 18-16
		Report		Arena: Volkswagen Arena

13 November 2016 6	Fenerbahçe	92–74	Galatasaray Odeabank	Istanbul
19:00 (FET)	Scoring by quarter: 19-20, 22-19, 21-7, 30-28
		Report		Arena: Ülker Sports Arena

20 November 2016 7	Demir İnşaat Büyükçekmece	60–80	Fenerbahçe	Istanbul
13:00 (FET)	Scoring by quarter: 19-18, 10-12, 6-23, 25-27
		Report		Arena: Gazanfer Bilge Sports Hall

27 November 2016 8	Fenerbahçe	91–57	Best Balıkesir	Istanbul
13:00 (FET)	Scoring by quarter: 21-13, 21-22, 26-7, 23-15
		Report		Arena: Ülker Sports Arena

4 December 2016 9	Tofaş	81–72	Fenerbahçe	Bursa
17:00 (FET)	Scoring by quarter: 27-18, 21-20, 22-18, 11-16
		Report		Arena: Tofaş Nilüfer Sports Hall

11 December 2016 10	Fenerbahçe	76–71	Banvit	Istanbul
13:00 (FET)	Scoring by quarter: 19-18, 16-18, 19-20, 22-15
		Report		Arena: Ülker Sports Arena

18 December 2016 11	Gaziantep Basketbol	98–102(OT)	Fenerbahçe	Gaziantep
18:00 (FET)	Scoring by quarter: 27-24, 19-24, 26-20, 20-24, Overtime: 6-10
		Report		Arena: Karataş Şahinbey Sport Hall

25 December 2016 12	Fenerbahçe	98–78	Trabzonspor Medical Park	Istanbul
19:00 (FET)	Scoring by quarter: 20-25, 23-17, 26-16, 29-20
		Report		Arena: Ülker Sports Arena

2 January 2017 13	Fenerbahçe	81–75	Anadolu Efes	Istanbul
19:00 (FET)	Scoring by quarter: 20-14, 21-20, 20-22, 20-19
		Report		Arena: Ülker Sports Arena

8 January 2017 14	Beşiktaş Sompo Japan	76–79	Fenerbahçe	Istanbul
20:30 (FET)	Scoring by quarter: 21-21, 24-18, 18-21, 13-19
		Report		Arena: Akatlar Arena

21 January 2017 15	Fenerbahçe	89–76	TED Ankara Kolejliler	Istanbul
17:00 (FET)	Scoring by quarter: 24-18, 20-11, 16-18, 29-29
		Report		Arena: Ülker Sports Arena

29 January 2017 16	Fenerbahçe	98–89	Muratbey Uşak Sportif	Istanbul
13:00 (FET)	Scoring by quarter: 34-21, 24-19, 18-21, 22-28
		Report		Arena: Ülker Sports Arena

5 February 2017 17	İstanbul BB	69–76	Fenerbahçe	Istanbul
15:30 (FET)	Scoring by quarter: 20-20, 13-17, 13-18, 23-21
		Report		Arena: Cebeci Sport Hall

12 February 2017 18	Fenerbahçe	76–65	Yeşilgiresun Belediye	Istanbul
19:00 (FET)	Scoring by quarter: 17-14, 13-18, 26-14, 20-19
		Report		Arena: Ülker Sports Arena

26 February 2017 19	Pınar Karşıyaka	73–85(OT)	Fenerbahçe	İzmir
16:00 (FET)	Scoring by quarter: 18-22, 16-14, 15-16, 16-13, Overtime: 8-20
		Report		Arena: Mustafa Kemal Atatürk Karşıyaka Sport Hall

4 March 2017 20	Fenerbahçe	79–76	Darüşşafaka Doğuş	Istanbul
20:30 (FET)	Scoring by quarter: 15-19, 23-22, 19-16, 22-19
		Report		Arena: Ülker Sports Arena

11 March 2017 21	Galatasaray Odeabank	75–79	Fenerbahçe	Istanbul
16:00 (FET)	Scoring by quarter: 19-15, 22-13, 15-22, 19-29
		Report		Arena: Abdi İpekçi Arena

18 March 2017 22	Fenerbahçe	76–65	Demir İnşaat Büyükçekmece	Istanbul
19:00 (FET)	Scoring by quarter: 17-14, 13-18, 26-14, 20-19
		Report		Arena: Ülker Sports Arena

25 March 2017 23	Best Balıkesir	68–79	Fenerbahçe	Balıkesir
16:00 (FET)	Scoring by quarter: 15-22, 21-19, 6-17, 26-21
		Report		Arena: Kurtdereli Sports Hall

1 April 2017 24	Fenerbahçe	90–75	Tofaş	Istanbul
13:00 (FET)	Scoring by quarter: 21-17, 21-24, 21-17, 27-17
		Report		Arena: Ülker Sports Arena

8 April 2017 25	Banvit	75–86	Fenerbahçe	Bandırma, Balıkesir
13:00 (FET)	Scoring by quarter: 15-20, 13-26, 27-16, 20-14
		Report		Arena: Kara Ali Acar Sport Hall

15 April 2017 26	Fenerbahçe	97–92	Gaziantep Basketbol	Istanbul
13:00 (FET)	Scoring by quarter: 19-23, 16-36, 24-9, 38-24
		Report		Arena: Ülker Sports Arena

22 April 2017 27	Trabzonspor Medical Park	76–81	Fenerbahçe	Trabzon
19:00 (FET)	Scoring by quarter: 17-23, 17-20, 14-18, 28-20
		Report		Arena: Hayri Gür Arena

29 April 2017 28	Anadolu Efes	57–96	Fenerbahçe	Istanbul
20:00 (FET)	Scoring by quarter: 6-29, 23-21, 13-23, 15-23
		Report		Arena: Abdi İpekçi Arena

6 May 2017 29	Fenerbahçe	93–76	Beşiktaş Sompo Japan	Istanbul
19:00 (FET)	Scoring by quarter: 25-21, 21-16, 24-21, 23-18
		Report		Arena: Ülker Sports Arena

12 May 2017 30	TED Ankara Kolejliler	55–101	Fenerbahçe	Ankara
19:00 (FET)	Scoring by quarter: 13-24, 15-18, 11-35, 16-24
		Report		Arena: Ankara Arena

===== Playoffs =====
Quarterfinals
1	Fenerbahçe	92	79
8	Tofaş	76	73
4	Darüşşafaka Doğuş	72	74
5	Banvit	67	70
2	Beşiktaş Sompo Japan	66	77
7	Gaziantep Basketbol	57	70
3	Anadolu Efes	95	63	87
6	Galatasaray Odeabank	85	73	76

Semifinals
1	Fenerbahçe	94	95	90
4	Darüşşafaka Doğuş	72	81	74
2	Beşiktaş Sompo Japan	90	74	65	91
3	Anadolu Efes	71	72	66	65

Finals
1	Fenerbahçe	75	83	86	98
2	Beşiktaş Sompo Japan	69	74	80	94

=== Turkish Basketball Cup ===
15 February 2017	Anadolu Efes	82–74	Fenerbahçe	Ankara
18:30 (CET)	Scoring by quarter: 17-19, 22-20, 20-11, 23-24
A Spor		Boxscore		Arena: Ankara Arena; Referees: Mehmet Keseratar, Murat Biricik, Alper Altuğ Köselerli

=== EuroLeague ===
==== Regular season ====
Pos	Team	Pld	W	L	PF	PA	PD	Qualification
3	(Greece) Olympiacos	30	19	11	2330	2221	+109	Advance to Playoffs
4	(Greece) Panathinaikos Superfoods	30	19	11	2263	2187	+76	Advance to Playoffs
5	(Turkey) Fenerbahçe	30	18	12	2256	2233	+23	Advance to Playoffs
6	(Turkey) Anadolu Efes	30	17	13	2472	2467	+5	Advance to Playoffs
7	(Spain) Baskonia	30	17	13	2445	2376	+69	Advance to Playoffs

Source: EuroLeague
Rules for classification: All points scored in extra period(s) will not be counted in the standings, nor for any tie-break situation.

Win Loss

14 October 2016 1	Fenerbahçe (Turkey)	67–66	(Germany) Brose Bamberg	Istanbul
19:30 (CEST)	Scoring by quarter: 18–22, 18–11, 17–18, 14–15
	Pts: Bogdanović 18; Rebs: Udoh 7 Asts: Sloukas 4 PIR: Bogdanović 19	Boxscore	Pts: Miller 17; Rebs: Melli 12; Asts: Zisis 5 PIR: Miller 20	Arena: Ülker Sports Arena; Attendance: 11127; Referees: Sreten Radović (CRO), Fernando Rocha (POR), Carlos Peruga (ESP),

21 October 2016 2	FC Barcelona Lassa (Spain)	72–73	(Turkey) Fenerbahçe	Barcelona
21:00 (CEST)	Scoring by quarter: 19–21, 17–19, 15–13, 21–20
	Pts: Rice 19; Rebs: Tomić 8 Asts: Oleson, Rice 6 PIR: Rice 19	Boxscore	Pts: Dixon, Sloukas 15; Rebs: Udoh 8 Asts: Bogdanović, Sloukas 4 PIR: Udoh 15	Arena: Palau Blaugrana; Attendance: 5,827; Referees: Luigi Lamonica (ITA), Oļegs Latiševs (LAT), Miloš Koljenšić (MNE)

26 October 2016 3	Fenerbahçe (Turkey)	82–68	(Lithuania) Žalgiris	Istanbul
19:45 (CEST)	Scoring by quarter: 28–24, 16–13, 19–19, 19–12
	Pts: Udoh, Veselý 14; Rebs: Udoh 8 Asts: Sloukas 11; PIR: Udoh 25	Boxscore	Pts: Westermann 15; Rebs: Ulanovas 5 Asts: Westermann 4 PIR: Westermann 15	Arena: Ülker Sports Arena; Attendance: 10869; Referees: Robert Lottermoser (GER), Carlos Cortés (ESP), Tomasz Trawicki (POL)

28 October 2016 4	Galatasaray Odeabank (Turkey)	87–103	(Turkey) Fenerbahçe	Istanbul
19:00 (CEST)	Scoring by quarter: 19–22, 22–26, 23–22, 23–33
	Pts: Daye 16; Rebs: Tyus 8 Asts: Güler 4 PIR: Daye 17	Boxscore	Pts: Sloukas 24; Rebs: Udoh 13; Asts: Sloukas 7 PIR: Udoh 31	Arena: Abdi İpekçi; Attendance: 9251; Referees: Daniel Hierrezuelo (ESP), Borys Ryzhyk (UKR), Jakub Zamojski (POL)

2 November 2016 5	Fenerbahçe (Turkey)	73–81	(Russia) UNICS	Istanbul
18:00 (CET)	Scoring by quarter: 15–20, 24–23, 23–20, 11–18
	Pts: Dixon 23; Rebs: Datome 8 Asts: Dixon, Sloukas 5 PIR: Dixon 23	Boxscore	Pts: Langford 28; Rebs: Parakhouski 12; Asts: Colom 11; PIR: Langford 36	Arena: Ülker Sports Arena; Attendance: 10,347 (tentative); Referees: Juan Carlos García González (ESP), Elias Koromilas (GRE), Siniša Herceg (CRO)

11 November 2016 6	Baskonia (Spain)	86–52	(Turkey) Fenerbahçe	Vitoria-Gasteiz
21:00 (CEST)	Scoring by quarter: 14–11, 27–13, 26–16, 19–12
	Pts: three players 13; Rebs: Voigtmann 13; Asts: Larkin, Luz 6 PIR: Voigtmann 22	Boxscore	Pts: Sloukas 9 Rebs: Udoh 7 Asts: Kalinić 3 PIR: Udoh 12	Arena: Fernando Buesa Arena; Attendance: 14,128; Referees: Christos Christodoulou (GRE), Saša Pukl (SLO), Carmelo Paternico (ITA)

15 November 2016 7	Maccabi Tel Aviv (Israel)	87–77	(Turkey) Fenerbahçe	Tel Aviv
20:05 (CET)	Scoring by quarter: 15–17, 28–22, 23–21, 21–17
	Pts: Weems 22; Rebs: Rudd 5 Asts: Smith, Ohayon 6 PIR: Ohayon 25	Boxscore	Pts: Udoh 17; Rebs: Udoh, Veselý 8 Asts: Sloukas 8 PIR: Veselý 26	Arena: Menora Mivtachim Arena; Attendance: 11,060; Referees: Miguel Pérez Pérez (ESP), Damir Javor (SLO), Ioannis Foufis (GRE)

17 November 2016 8	Fenerbahçe (Turkey)	88–80	(Turkey) Anadolu Efes	Istanbul
18:45 (CET)	Scoring by quarter: 17–25, 26–17, 21–19, 24–19
	Pts: Sloukas 21; Rebs: Datome, Udoh 7 Asts: Sloukas 4 PIR: Sloukas 25	Boxscore	Pts: Granger 19; Rebs: Brown 10; Asts: Brown 7 PIR: Brown 21	Arena: Ülker Sports Arena; Attendance: 10,057; Referees: Juan Carlos García González (ESP), Elias Koromilas (GRE), Amit Balak (ISR)

24 November 2016 9	EA7 Emporio Armani Milan (Italy)	70–79	(Turkey) Fenerbahçe	Assago
20:45 (CET)	Scoring by quarter: 17–21, 19–23, 27–14, 7–21
	Pts: Sanders 17; Rebs: McLean 8 Asts: Kalnietis 6 PIR: McLean 22	Boxscore	Pts: Sloukas 18; Rebs: Sloukas 7 Asts: Sloukas 4 PIR: Sloukas 25	Arena: Mediolanum Forum; Attendance: 12,046; Referees: Benjamín Jiménez (ESP), Oļegs Latiševs (LAT), Jakub Zamojski (POL)

1 December 2016 10	Fenerbahçe (Turkey)	78–77	(Spain) Real Madrid	Istanbul
18:45 (CET)	Scoring by quarter: 23–19, 16–21, 18–17, 21–20
	Pts: Nunnally 18; Rebs: Udoh 10; Asts: Sloukas, Dixon 6 PIR: Udoh, Nunnally 22	Boxscore	Pts: Randolph 16; Rebs: Hunter 7 Asts: Fernández 9 PIR: Randolph 18	Arena: Ülker Sports Arena; Attendance: 12,576; Referees: Sreten Radović (CRO), Robert Lottermoser (GER), Piotr Pastusiak (POL)

8 December 2016 11	Fenerbahçe (Turkey)	87–72	(Serbia) Crvena zvezda mts	Istanbul
18:45 (CET)	Scoring by quarter: 20-18, 21-13, 27-19, 19-22
	Pts: Udoh 15; Rebs: Udoh 9 Asts: Sloukas 9 PIR: Udoh 34	Boxscore	Pts: Simonović 14; Rebs: Kuzmić 10; Asts: Wolters 4 PIR: Simonović 14	Arena: Fenerbahçe Ülker Sports Arena; Attendance: 9,017; Referees: Miguel Perez Perez (ESP), Fernando Rocha (POR), Tomazs Trawicki (POL)

16 December 2016 12	Panathinaikos Superfoods (Greece)	81–70	(Turkey) Fenerbahçe	Athens
20:45 (CET)	Scoring by quarter: 23–14, 18–23, 20–15, 20–18
	Pts: N. Calathes 16; Rebs: N. Calathes 8 Asts: N. Calathes 11; PIR: N. Calathes 34	Boxscore	Pts: Nunnally 21; Rebs: Udoh 9 Asts: Udoh, Dixon 4 PIR: Udoh 21	Arena: Olympic Sports Center Athens; Attendance: 13,204; Referees: Borys Ryzhyk (UKR), Oļegs Latiševs (LAT), Petri Mäntylä (FIN)

21 December 2016 13	Fenerbahçe (Turkey)	64–71	(Turkey) Darüşşafaka Doğuş	Istanbul
18:45 (CET)	Scoring by quarter: 18–20, 17–17, 13–13, 16–21
	Pts: Sloukas 16; Rebs: Udoh 7 Asts: Sloukas 4 PIR: Udoh 18	Boxscore	Pts: Wilbekin 22; Rebs: Clyburn 7 Asts: Clyburn, Anderson 2 PIR: Clyburn 24	Arena: Fenerbahçe Ülker Sports Arena; Attendance: 7,891 (tentative); Referees: Luigi Lamonica (ITA), Emilio Pérez Pizarro (ESP), Spiros Gkontas (GRE)

23 December 2016 14	CSKA Moscow (Russia)	79–95(OT)	(Turkey) Fenerbahçe	Moscow
18:00 (CET)	Scoring by quarter: 23–13, 18–23, 18–22, 16–17, Overtime: 4–20
	Pts: Teodosić 21; Rebs: Augustine, Khryapa 6 Asts: Jackson 6 PIR: Teodosić, Kurbanov 16	Boxscore	Pts: Dixon 25; Rebs: Udoh 11; Asts: Dixon 6 PIR: Udoh 33	Arena: Megasport Arena; Attendance: 8,011; Referees: Daniel Hierrezuelo (ESP), Robert Lottermosser (GER), Jakub Zamojski (POL)

29 December 2016 15	Olympiacos (Greece)	71–62	(Turkey) Fenerbahçe	Piraeus
20:00 (CET)	Scoring by quarter: 18–9, 22–12, 18–19, 13–22
	Pts: Lojeski 14; Rebs: Birch 13; Asts: Spanoulis 7 PIR: Birch 24	Boxscore	Pts: Veselý 22; Rebs: Veselý 10; Asts: Sloukas 6 PIR: Veselý 29	Arena: Peace and Friendship Stadium; Attendance: 11,039; Referees: Miguel Pérez Pérez (ESP), Borys Rhyzhyk (UKR), Piotr Pastusiak (POL)

6 January 2017 16	Fenerbahçe (Turkey)	86–79	(Italy) EA7 Emporio Armani Milan	Istanbul
18:45 (CET)	Scoring by quarter: 18–19, 23–21, 22–18, 23–21
	Pts: Nunnally 19; Rebs: Udoh 8 Asts: Nunnally 5 PIR: Nunnally, Udoh 23	Boxscore	Pts: Kalnietis 20; Rebs: Raduljica 5 Asts: Dragić, Hickman 4 PIR: Kalnietis 23	Arena: Fenerbahçe Ülker Sports Arena; Attendance: 8,308; Referees: Christos Christodoulou (GRE), Matej Boltauzer (SLO), Carlos Cortés (ESP)

12 January 2017 17	Crvena zvezda mts (Serbia)	75–73	(Turkey) Fenerbahçe	Belgrade
20:45 (CET)	Scoring by quarter: 23–23, 21–19, 17–17, 14–14
	Pts: Kuzmić 21; Rebs: Kuzmić 8 Asts: Jović 7 PIR: Kuzmić 28	Boxscore	Pts: Udoh, Datome 16; Rebs: Bogdanović 6 Asts: Bogdanović 6 PIR: Udoh 25	Arena: Aleksandar Nikolić; Attendance: 6,500; Referees: Robert Lottermoser (GER), Elias Koromilas (GRE), Robert Vyklický (CZE)

19 January 2017 18	Fenerbahçe (Turkey)	84–63	(Greece) Panathinaikos Superfoods	Istanbul
18:30 (CET)	Scoring by quarter: 27–16, 17–12, 16–17, 24–18
	Pts: Datome 16; Rebs: Antić 8 Asts: Bogdanović 5 PIR: Veselý 19	Boxscore	Pts: James 25; Rebs: Gabriel 7 Asts: N. Calathes 4 PIR: James 33	Arena: Fenerbahçe Ülker Sports Arena; Attendance: 11,735; Referees: Luigi Lamonica (ITA), Boris Ryzhyk (UKR), Rain Peerandi (EST)

24 January 2017 19	UNICS (Russia)	81–86	(Turkey) Fenerbahçe	Kazan
17:00 (CET)	Scoring by quarter: 15–22, 19–17, 26–29, 21–18
	Pts: Parakhouski 21; Rebs: Parakhouski 9 Asts: Clarke 5 PIR: Parakhouski 28	Boxscore	Pts: Datome 18; Rebs: Bogdanović 5 Asts: Bogdanović 7 PIR: Bogdanović 25	Arena: Basket Hall Kazan; Attendance: 3,633; Referees: Christos Christodoulou (GRE), Tomislav Hordov (CRO), Jakub Zamojski (POL)

26 January 2017 20	Fenerbahçe (Turkey)	85–80	(Turkey) Galatasaray Odeabank	Istanbul
18:45 (CET)	Scoring by quarter: 19–27, 22–27, 23–12, 21–14
	Pts: Veselý 20; Rebs: Veselý 7 Asts: Sloukas 7 PIR: Veselý 30	Boxscore	Pts: Schilb 21; Rebs: Pleiß 6 Asts: Güler 8 PIR: Schilb 24	Arena: Fenerbahçe Ülker Sports Arena; Attendance: 12,731; Referees: Daniel Hierrezuelo (ESP), Carmelo Paternico (GRE), Josip Radojković (CRO)

2 February 2017 21	Fenerbahçe (Turkey)	77–71	(Russia) CSKA Moscow	Istanbul
18:45 (CET)	Scoring by quarter: 15–14, 21–26, 24–11, 17–20
	Pts: Udoh 15; Rebs: Udoh 11; Asts: Bogdanović 8 PIR: Udoh 25	Boxscore	Pts: de Colo 23; Rebs: Kurbanov 6 Asts: de Colo 4 PIR: de Colo 24	Arena: Fenerbahçe Ülker Sports Arena; Attendance: 12,831; Referees: Miguel Pérez Pérez (ESP), Borys Ryzhyk (UKR), Robert Lottermoser (GER)

10 February 2017 22	Darüşşafaka Doğuş (Turkey)	72–65	(Turkey) Fenerbahçe	Istanbul
18:00 (CET)	Scoring by quarter: 10–20, 24–11, 13–16, 25–18
	Pts: Clyburn 20; Rebs: Žižić 10; Asts: Wanamaker 11; PIR: Žižić 25	Boxscore	Pts: Bogdanović 18; Rebs: Datome 9 Asts: Dixon 3 PIR: Bogdanović, Dixon 15	Arena: Volkswagen Arena; Attendance: 4,956; Referees: Sreten Radović (CRO), Matej Boltauzer (SLO), Carlos Peruga (ESP)

23 February 2017 23	Fenerbahçe (Turkey)	67–64	(Greece) Olympiacos	Istanbul
18:45 (CET)	Scoring by quarter: 22-22, 18-12, 7-22, 22-8
	Pts: Bogdanović 27; Rebs: Dixon 7 Asts: Bogdanović 4 PIR: Bogdanović 29	Boxscore	Pts: Green 17; Rebs: Papanikolaou 8 Asts: Mantzaris 6 PIR: Papanikolaou 16	Arena: Fenerbahçe Ülker Sports Arena; Attendance: 12,439; Referees: Fernando Rocha (POR), Juan Carlos Garcia Gonzalez (ESP), Olegs Latisevs (LAT)

2 March 2017 24	Žalgiris (Lithuania)	67–76	(Turkey) Fenerbahçe	Kaunas
18:00 (CET)	Scoring by quarter: 17–19, 14–11, 17–25, 19–21
	Pts: Jankūnas 15; Rebs: Jankūnas 7 Asts: Westermann 6 PIR: Jankūnas 23	Boxscore	Pts: Udoh 16; Rebs: Udoh 7 Asts: Dixon 9 PIR: Udoh 27	Arena: Žalgirio Arena; Attendance: 12,179; Referees: Saša Pukl (SLO), Emilio Pérez Pizarro (ESP), Petri Mäntylä (FIN)

9 March 2017 25	Fenerbahçe (Turkey)	74–79	(Spain) Baskonia	Istanbul
18:45 (CET)	Scoring by quarter: 18-19, 17-24, 20-18, 19-18
	Pts: Bogdanović 26; Rebs: Kalinić 5 Asts: Bogdanović 8 PIR: Bogdanović 26	Boxscore	Pts: Larkin 19; Rebs: Hanga, Shengelia 6 Asts: Luz 4 PIR: Larkin 18	Arena: Fenerbahçe Ülker Sports Arena; Attendance: 12,645; Referees: Christos Christodoulou (GRE), Carmelo Paternico (ITA), Amit Balak (ISR)

16 March 2017 26	Brose Bamberg (Germany)	78–83	(Turkey) Fenerbahçe	Bamberg
20:45 (CET)	Scoring by quarter: 21-27, 17-15, 18-26, 22-15
	Pts: Dixon 26; Rebs: Dixon, Veselý 6 Asts: Udoh, Nunnally 4 PIR: Dixon 26	Boxscore	Pts: Causeur, Zisis 15; Rebs: Melli 8 Asts: Zisis, Miller, Heckmann 3 PIR: Zisis 18	Arena: Brose Arena; Attendance: 6,150; Referees: Sreten Radovic (CRO), Ioannis Foufis (GRE), Carlos Cortes (ESP)

21 March 2017 27	Fenerbahçe (Turkey)	79–81	(Israel) Maccabi Tel Aviv	Istanbul
18:45 (CET)	Scoring by quarter: 25–15, 16–23, 18–18, 20–25
	Pts: Mahmutoğlu 15; Rebs: Udoh 10; Asts: Dixon 7 PIR: Udoh 20	Boxscore	Pts: Landesberg 22; Rebs: Simpson 12; Asts: Ohayon 6 PIR: Simpson 26	Arena: Fenerbahçe Ülker Sports Arena; Attendance: 12,174; Referees: Daniel Hierrezuelo (ESP), Matej Boltauzer (SLO), Jurgis Laurinavičius (LTU)

23 March 2017 28	Anadolu Efes (Turkey)	80–77	(Turkey) Fenerbahçe	Istanbul
18:30 (CET)	Scoring by quarter: 21–14, 23–21, 21–19, 15–23
	Pts: Dunston 14; Rebs: three players 4 Asts: Granger 5 PIR: Balbay, Granger 14	Boxscore	Pts: Dixon 19; Rebs: Udoh 10; Asts: Bogdanović 4 PIR: Dixon 27	Arena: Abdi İpekçi Arena; Attendance: 7,979; Referees: Spiros Gkontas (GRE), Emilio Pérez Pizarro (ESP), Seffi Shemmesh (ISR)

31 March 2017 29	Real Madrid (Spain)	61–56	(Turkey) Fenerbahçe	Madrid
21:00 (CEST)	Scoring by quarter: 20–16, 9–16, 19–11, 13–13
	Pts: Llull 16; Rebs: Ayón 8 Asts: Ayón 3 PIR: Ayón, Llull 11	Boxscore	Pts: Bogdanović 15; Rebs: Veselý 7 Asts: Dixon 3 PIR: Veselý 18	Arena: WiZink Center; Attendance: 10,827; Referees: Christos Christodoulou (GRE), Saša Pukl (SLO), Amit Balak (ISR)

6 April 2017 30	Fenerbahçe (Turkey)	68–65(OT)	(Spain) FC Barcelona Lassa	Istanbul
19:45 (CEST)	Scoring by quarter: 11–15, 19–16, 14–15, 14–12, Overtime: 10–7
	Pts: Bogdanović 15; Rebs: Udoh 15; Asts: Sloukas 5 PIR: Udoh 27	Boxscore	Pts: Rice 19; Rebs: Tomić, Claver 7 Asts: Tomić, Perperoglou 4 PIR: Claver 18	Arena: Fenerbahçe Ülker Sports Arena; Attendance: 11,790; Referees: Fernando Rocha (POR), Ioannis Foufis (GRE), Tomislav Hodrov (CRO)

==== Playoffs ====
In the playoffs, teams play against each other which must win three games to win the series. Thus, if one team win three games before all five games have been played, the games that remain are omitted. The team that finished in the higher

Game 1 was played on 18 April, while Game 2 was played on 20 April and Game 3 also played on 25 April 2016.

Team 1	Agg.	Team 2	1st leg	2nd leg	3rd leg
Panathinaikos Superfoods (Greece)	0–3	(Turkey) Fenerbahçe	58–71	75-80	79-61

Win Loss

18 April 2017	Panathinaikos Superfoods (Greece)	58–71	(Turkey) Fenerbahçe	Athens
20:00 (CEST)	Scoring by quarter: 15–16, 27–12, 8–20, 8–23
	Pts: Rivers 16; Rebs: Bourousis 6 Asts: Calathes 5 PIR: James 13	Boxscore	Pts: Bogdanović 23; Rebs: Sloukas 6 Asts: Sloukas 5 PIR: Bogdanović 35	Arena: Olympic Indoor Hall; Attendance: 17,829; Referees: Daniel Hierrezuelo (ESP), Ilija Belosevic (SRB), Carmelo Paternico (ITA)

20 April 2017	Panathinaikos Superfoods (Greece)	75–80	(Turkey) Fenerbahçe	Athens
20:00 (CEST)	Scoring by quarter: 20-22, 23-23, 16-18, 16-17
	Pts: Mike James 22; Rebs: Ioannis Bourousis 6 Asts: Mike James 4 PIR: Mike James 22	Boxscore	Pts: Bogdan Bogdanović 25; Rebs: Ekpe Udoh 9 Asts: Kostas Sloukas 7 PIR: Bogdan Bogdanović 35	Arena: Olympic Indoor Hall; Attendance: 17,419; Referees: Sasa Pukl (SLO), Olegs Latisevs (LAT), Benjamin Jimenez (ESP)

25 April 2017	Fenerbahçe (Turkey)	79–61	(Greece) Panathinaikos Superfoods	Istanbul
19:45 (CEST)	Scoring by quarter: 18–17, 19–13, 15–12, 27–19
	Pts: Dixon 13; Rebs: Udoh 10; Asts: Sloukas 4 PIR: Udoh 18	Boxscore	Pts: Rivers 16; Rebs: Gist, Singleton 5 Asts: James 4 PIR: Rivers 14	Arena: Ülker Sports Arena; Attendance: 12,973; Referees: Luigi Lamonica (ITA), Fernando Rocha (POR), Borys Ryzhyk (UKR)

==== Final Four ====
The Final Four is the last phase of the season, and is held over a weekend. The semifinal games play on Friday evening. Sunday starts with the third-place game, followed by the championship game. The Final Four was played at the Sinan Erdem Dome in Istanbul, Turkey on 19 and 21 May 2017.

Istanbul	Istanbul (Europe)
Sinan Erdem Dome	Istanbul (Europe)
Capacity: 16,647	Istanbul (Europe)

===== Bracket =====
Semifinals; 19 May
(Turkey) Fenerbahçe	84
(Spain) Real Madrid	75
(Russia) CSKA Moscow	78
(Greece) Olympiacos	82

Championship game 21 May
(Turkey) Fenerbahçe	80
(Greece) Olympiacos	64
Third place game
(Spain) Real Madrid	70
(Russia) CSKA Moscow	94

===== Semifinal =====
19 May 2017	Fenerbahçe (Turkey)	84–75	(Spain) Real Madrid	Istanbul
20:30 (CEST)	Scoring by quarter: 21–13, 23–21, 19–16, 21–25
	Pts: Udoh 18; Rebs: Udoh 12; Asts: Udoh 8 PIR: Udoh 36	Boxscore	Pts: Llull 28; Rebs: Hunter 8 Asts: Llull 7 PIR: Llull 32	Arena: Sinan Erdem Dome; Attendance: 15,671; Referees: Luigi Lamonica (ITA), Borys Rhyzhyk (UKR), Oļegs Latiševs (LAT)

Starters:			Pts	Reb	Ast
PG	35	(Turkey) Bobby Dixon	9	1	3
SG	13	(Serbia) Bogdan Bogdanović	14	6	1
SF	33	(Serbia) Nikola Kalinić	12	6	6
PF	24	(Czech Republic) Jan Veselý	12	3	3
C	8	(United States) Ekpe Udoh	18	12	8
Reserves:					
SG	10	(Turkey) Melih Mahmutoğlu	DNP		
C	12	(North Macedonia) Pero Antić	DNP		
PF	15	(Canada) Anthony Bennett	DNP		
PG	16	(Greece) Kostas Sloukas	9	3	1
SF	21	(United States) James Nunnally	2	1	2
C	44	(Turkey) Ahmet Düverioğlu	DNP		
SF	70	(Italy) Luigi Datome	8	1	0
Head coach:
(Basketball Federation of Serbia) Željko Obradović

Fenerbahçe	Real Madrid

Starters:			Pts	Reb	Ast
PG	7	(Slovenia) Luka Dončić	0	2	3
SG	23	(Spain) Sergio Llull	28	1	8
SF	8	(Lithuania) Jonas Mačiulis	0	0	1
PF	3	(United States) Anthony Randolph	7	2	0
C	14	(Mexico) Gustavo Ayón	2	4	0
Reserves:					
PG	4	(Croatia) Dontaye Draper	0	0	1
SG	5	(Spain) Rudy Fernández	0	1	0
PF	9	(Spain) Felipe Reyes	DNP		
SG	20	(Azerbaijan) Jaycee Carroll	21	1	0
C	21	(United States) Othello Hunter	6	7	0
PF	33	(United States) Trey Thompkins	8	3	0
SF	34	(Sweden) Jeffery Taylor	3	0	0
Head coach:
(Spanish Basketball Federation) Pablo Laso

===== Championship game =====
Fenerbahçe played in its second consecutive championship game, after it lost to CSKA Moscow in 2016. Olympiacos returned to the title game for the first time since 2015.

The first two quarters were evenly matched. Fenerbahçe opened the scoring and led by 5–1 before Olympiacos replied with five unanswered points. They relinquished the lead soon after and were unable to regain it for the remainder of the game. Fenerbahçe took an eight-point lead over Olympiacos after the first quarter, with a score of 26–18, though Olympiacos had reduced the deficit to five points, to 39–34, by half time. Fenerbahçe broke away in the third quarter, taking a commanding twelve point lead to go into the fourth quarter 60–48 up. An 11–2 run by Fenerbahçe at the start of the final quarter effectively secured the title for the club. The game ended with a score of 80–64. Fenerbahçe led at each quarter on its way to the title, and head coach Željko Obradović added to his record total of nine EuroLeague championships. Fenerbahçe became the Turkish first club to win the EuroLeague championship.

Bogdan Bogdanović and Nikola Kalinić both scored the most points, with 17 each, while Ekpe Udoh set a EuroLeague championship game record of five blocks. Udoh was also named EuroLeague Final Four MVP.

21 May 2017	Fenerbahçe (Turkey)	80–64	(Greece) Olympiacos	Istanbul
20:00 (CEST)	Scoring by quarter: 26–18, 13–16, 21–14, 20–16
	Pts: Bogdanović, Kalinić 17; Rebs: Udoh 9 Asts: Kalinić, Sloukas 5 PIR: Udoh 29		Pts: Birch 14; Rebs: Papanikolaou 5 Asts: Spanoulis 8 PIR: Birch 16	Arena: Sinan Erdem Dome; Attendance: 15,671; Referees: Daniel Hierrezuelo (ESP), Borys Rhyzhyk (UKR), Oļegs Latiševs (LAT)

Starters:			Pts	Reb	Ast
PG	35	(Turkey) Bobby Dixon	8	2	2
SG	13	(Serbia) Bogdan Bogdanović	17	5	1
SF	33	(Serbia) Nikola Kalinić	17	5	5
PF	24	(Czech Republic) Jan Veselý	8	8	2
C	8	(United States) Ekpe Udoh	10	9	4
Reserves:					
SG	10	(Turkey) Melih Mahmutoğlu	0	0	0
C	12	(North Macedonia) Pero Antić	4	1	1
PF	15	(Canada) Anthony Bennett	0	0	0
PG	16	(Greece) Kostas Sloukas	3	1	5
SF	21	(United States) James Nunnally	2	1	0
C	44	(Turkey) Ahmet Düverioğlu	0	0	0
SF	70	(Italy) Luigi Datome	11	6	0
Head coach:
(Basketball Federation of Serbia) Željko Obradović

Fenerbahçe	Olympiacos

2016–17 EuroLeague champions
Fenerbahçe
(1st title)

Starters:			Pts	Reb	Ast
PG	17	(Greece) Vangelis Mantzaris	9	1	3
SG	7	(Greece) Vassilis Spanoulis	9	2	8
SF	16	(Greece) Kostas Papanikolaou	3	5	3
PF	15	(Greece) Georgios Printezis	7	1	1
C	2	(Canada) Khem Birch	14	0	0
Reserves:					
PG	1	(United States) Erick Green	7	4	0
C	4	(United States) Patric Young	0	0	0
PG	5	(Greece) Vassilis Toliopoulos	3	0	0
PF	6	(Greece) Ioannis Papapetrou	0	2	0
PG	9	(United States) Dominic Waters	2	1	1
C	10	(Greece) Dimitrios Agravanis	0	3	1
C	11	(Serbia) Nikola Milutinov	10	4	1
Head coach:
(Hellenic Basketball Federation) Ioannis Sfairopoulos

==== Individual awards ====
EuroLeague MVP of the Round

- (United States) Ekpe Udoh – Regular Season, Round 4
- (Czech Republic) Jan Veselý - Regular Season, Round 20
- (Serbia) Bogdan Bogdanović - Playoffs, Game 1
- (Serbia) Bogdan Bogdanović - Playoffs, Game 2

EuroLeague MVP of the Month

- (Serbia) Bogdan Bogdanović, April

EuroLeague Final Four MVP

- (United States) Ekpe Udoh
