= Ahmet Düverioğlu =

Turkish-Jordanian basketball player

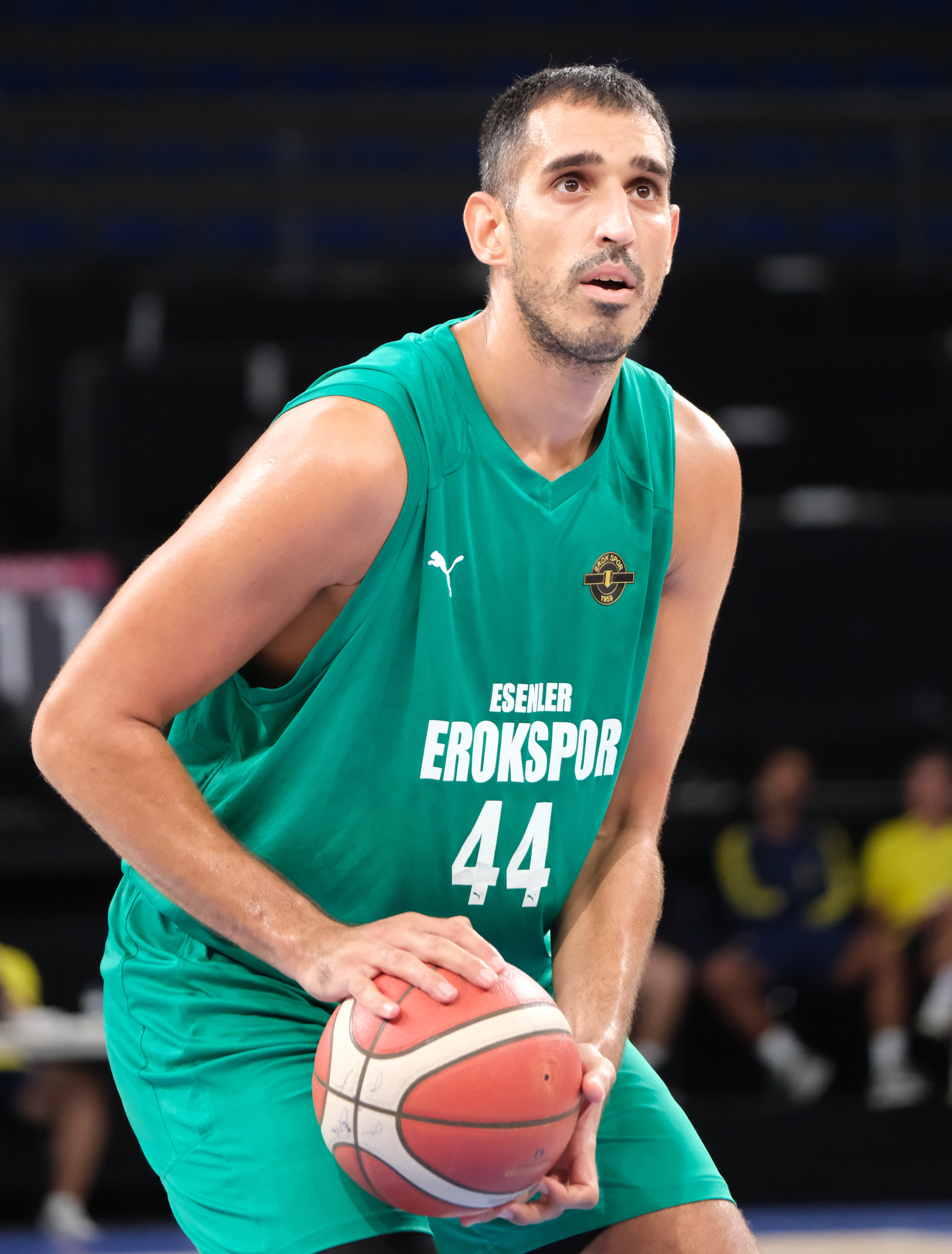
- Düverioğlu with Esenler Erokspor in 2025

Free Agent
- Position: Center

Personal information
- Born: 4 March 1993 (age 33) Istanbul, Turkey
- Listed height: 2.13 m (7 ft 0 in)
- Listed weight: 121 kg (267 lb)

Career information
- NBA draft: 2015: undrafted
- Playing career: 2009–present

Career history
- 2009–2010: Zain
- 2010–2012: Al Riyadi
- 2012–2014: A.S.U.
- 2014: Pertevniyal
- 2015–2016: Anadolu Efes
- 2016–2022: Fenerbahçe
- 2022–2023: Frutti Extra Bursaspor
- 2023–2024: Çağdaş Bodrumspor
- 2024–2025: Dubai Basketball
- 2025–2026: Esenler Erokspor

Career highlights
- EuroLeague champion (2017); 3× Turkish League champion (2017, 2018, 2022); 2× Turkish Cup winner (2019, 2020); 3× Turkish Supercup winner (2015–2017); 2× Jordanian League champion (2013, 2014)
Medals
Men's basketball
Representing Jordan
Asian Games
Silver medal – second place	2022 Hangzhou	Team

Ahmet Düverioğlu (born 4 March 1993), known as Ahmad Hekmat Al-Dwairi in Jordan, is a Turkish-Jordanian international professional basketball player who last played for Esenler Erokspor of the Basketbol Süper Ligi (BSL). He uses his Turkish passport in the EuroLeague competition. Standing at a height of 2.13 m (7 ft 0 in), he plays at the center position.

== Professional career ==
=== Early years ===
Düverioğlu began playing professional basketball for Zain in the Jordanian Premier Basketball League in 2009. In 2010, he moved to the Jordanian club Al Riyadi. Then he transferred to A.S.U., where he won two Jordanian league titles. After two years with A.S.U., in 2014, he moved to Serbia, and signed with Mega Vizura.

=== Anadolu Efes ===
After terminating his contract with Mega Vizura, where he did not play any game, Düverioğlu moved to Turkey (where he was born, and already had citizenship), and signed with Pertevniyal of the Turkish 2nd Division, which was a satellite club of Anadolu Efes. After the 2013–14 season ended, he moved to Anadolu Efes, where he won the 2015 Turkish Presidential Cup. He played in the EuroLeague with the same team in the 2015-16 season. His best performance with Anadolu Efes was against Laboral Kutxa, in game where he had 8 points, 3 rebounds, and 1 block, in 9 mins 40 seconds of playing time.

=== Fenerbahçe ===
On 28 July 2016, Düverioğlu signed a three-year contract with the Turkish club Fenerbahçe. He started his Fenerbahçe career by winning the 2016 Turkish Presidential Cup. Under the guidance of Željko Obradović, his playing time and performance increased notably with Fenerbahçe. At the beginning of the 2016–17 season, which was the most successful in the history of the club, Düverioğlu won the 2017 Turkish Presidential Cup with Fener. At the end of the season, he won the 2016–17 Turkish Super League and the 2016–17 EuroLeague, completing a continental treble. His best performance with Fenerbahçe in the EuroLeague was against Panathinaikos Superfoods, in game where he had 13 points, 4 rebounds, 1 assist and 1 block, in 15 mins 30 seconds of playing time.

In 2017–18 EuroLeague, Fenerbahçe made it to the 2018 EuroLeague Final Four, its fourth consecutive Final Four appearance. Eventually, they lost to Real Madrid with 80–85 in the final game.

On June 20, 2022, Düverioğlu officially parted ways with the Turkish club after six seasons.

=== Bursaspor ===
On June 21, 2022, he has signed with Frutti Extra Bursaspor of the Turkish Basketbol Süper Ligi (BSL).

=== Çağdaş Bodrumspor ===
On October 12, 2023, he signed with Çağdaş Bodrumspor of the Basketbol Süper Ligi.

=== Dubai Basketball ===
On July 18, 2024, he signed with Dubai Basketball of the ABA League.

=== Esenler Erokspor ===
On July 7, 2025, he signed with Esenler Erokspor of the Basketbol Süper Ligi (BSL).

== International career ==
Düverioğlu, under the name of Ahmad Al-Dwairi, is a regular senior Jordan national team player. He played for Jordan's national team at the 2014 Asian Games, averaging 11.5 points and 9.5 rebounds per game. He also played at the 2014 FIBA Asia Cup, where he averaged 12.7 points and 10.0 rebounds per game.

== Career statistics ==
Legend
GP	Games played	GS	Games started	MPG	Minutes per game
FG%	Field-goal percentage	3P%	3-point field-goal percentage	FT%	Free-throw percentage
RPG	Rebounds per game	APG	Assists per game	SPG	Steals per game
BPG	Blocks per game	PPG	Points per game	PIR	Performance index rating
**Bold**	Career high

=== EuroLeague ===
†	Denotes seasons in which Düverioğlu won the EuroLeague

Year	Team	GP	GS	MPG	FG%	3P%	FT%	RPG	APG	SPG	BPG	PPG	PIR
2015–16	Anadolu Efes	10	1	4.0	.643	—	.500	1.2	.2	.1	.1	1.9	1.4
2016–17†	Fenerbahçe	9	0	6.7	**.813**	—	**.667**	1.3	.1	.1	**.4**	3.3	4.2
2017–18	Fenerbahçe	27	12	9.0	.709	—	.462	1.8	.5	.3	.3	3.3	3.4
2018–19	Fenerbahçe	**31**	22	11.2	.621	—	.400	**2.6**	.7	**.5**	**.4**	2.9	3.6
2019–20	Fenerbahçe	17	8	9.7	.571	—	.625	2.5	.4	.3	.3	2.9	3.5
2020–21	Fenerbahçe	30	**23**	**11.5**	.701	—	.516	**2.6**	**.9**	.4	.3	**3.7**	4.4
2021–22	Fenerbahçe	18	6	8.3	.743	.000	.462	2.4	.1	.2	.2	3.6	**4.6**
Career		142	72	9.5	.677	.000	.496	2.2	.5	.3	.3	3.2	3.7

== Personal life ==
His father is Jordanian and his mother is Turkish. He was born in Istanbul, Turkey. He has Turkish citizenship due to his Turkish origin from his mother.
