= 2016 Turkish Basketball Presidential Cup =

Fenerbahçe	Anadolu Efes
77	69
- Date: 5 October 2016
- Venue: Ankara Arena, Ankara
- MVP: (Turkey) Bobby Dixon

The 2016 Turkish Basketball Presidential Cup was the 32nd edition of the Turkish Basketball Presidential Cup. The game was played by the Turkish Basketball League and Turkish Basketball Cup champions Fenerbahçe and the Turkish League runners-up Anadolu Efes.

Anadolu Efes made its 20th appearance, while Fenerbahçe played in its 13th President's Cup and won its 6th title.

== Venue ==
Ankara	2016 Turkish Basketball Presidential Cup (Turkey)
Ankara Arena	2016 Turkish Basketball Presidential Cup (Turkey)
Capacity: 10,400	2016 Turkish Basketball Presidential Cup (Turkey)

== Match details ==
President Recep Tayyip Erdoğan was in the attendance for the game. By halftime, Anadolu Efes was looking at a 37–29 deficit. By the end of the game, the difference was stayed the same and Anadolu Efes never really came close to Fenerbahçe. Bobby Dixon, who scored 19 points was named the President's Cup MVP.

5 October 2016	Fenerbahçe	77–69	Anadolu Efes	Ankara
20:00 (TRT)	Scoring by quarter: 15–9, 24–18, 25–29, 13–13
	Pts: Dixon, Datome 19; Rebs: Udoh 9 Asts: Sloukas 7	Boxscore	Pts: Granger 15; Rebs: Honeycutt 11; Asts: Granger 7	Arena: Ankara Spor Salonu; Referees: Emin Moğulkoç, Alper Altuğ Köselerli, Mehmet Serdar Ünal

Starters:			Pts	Reb	Ast
PG	35	(Turkey) Bobby Dixon	19	3	1
SG	21	(United States) James Nunnally	0	1	2
SF	70	(Italy) Luigi Datome	17	3	2
PF	8	(United States) Ekpe Udoh	11	9	0
C	24	(Czech Republic) Jan Veselý	15	5	0
Reserves:					
PF	5	(Turkey) Barış Hersek	0	0	0
SG	10	(Turkey) Melih Mahmutoğlu	3	5	3
PF	12	(North Macedonia) Pero Antić	0	2	1
PG	16	(Greece) Kostas Sloukas	12	2	7
SF	18	(Turkey) Egehan Arna	DNP		
PG	23	(Turkey) Berk Uğurlu	0	0	1
C	44	(Jordan) Ahmet Düverioğlu	DNP		
Head coach:
(Serbia) Željko Obradović

Fenerbahçe	Anadolu Efes

Fenerbahçe	Statistics	A. Efes
21/40 (52.5%)	2-pt field goals	20/38 (52.6%)
9/27 (33.3%)	3-pt field goals	4/15 (26.7%)
8/11 (72.3%)	Free throws	17/23 (73.9%)
14	Offensive rebounds	10
16	Defensive rebounds	21
30	Total rebounds	31
17	Assists	15
13	Turnovers	15
5	Steals	8
5	Blocks	1
21	Fouls	18

2016 Presidential Cup champions
Fenerbahçe
(6th title)

Starters:			Pts	Reb	Ast
PG	15	(Uruguay) Jayson Granger	15	3	7
SG	6	(Turkey) Cedi Osman	5	2	1
SF	12	(United States) Tyler Honeycutt	13	11	1
PF	2	(United States) Derrick Brown	0	2	0
C	42	(Armenia) Bryant Dunston	10	7	1
Reserves:					
PF	1	(United States) Deshaun Thomas	12	4	0
SG	3	(Turkey) Oğulcan Baykan	DNP		
PG	4	(Turkey) Doğuş Balbay	0	0	0
C	9	(Turkey) Samet Geyik	DNP		
SG	10	(Turkey) Furkan Korkmaz	2	1	0
PF	11	(Turkey) Berk Demir	DNP		
PG	31	(France) Thomas Heurtel	12	1	4
Head coach:
(Croatia) Velimir Perasović
