= 2017 Turkish Basketball Cup =

- Duration: February 15 – February 19, 2017
- Games played: 7
- Teams: 8

Finals
- Champions: Banvit (1st title)
- Runners-up: Anadolu Efes

Awards
- Final MVP: (North Macedonia) Jordan Theodore

The 2017 Turkish Basketball Cup was the 32nd edition of Turkey's professional national cup competition for men's basketball teams. The tournament was held in the Ankara Arena in the capital city of Ankara, Turkey.

== Bracket ==
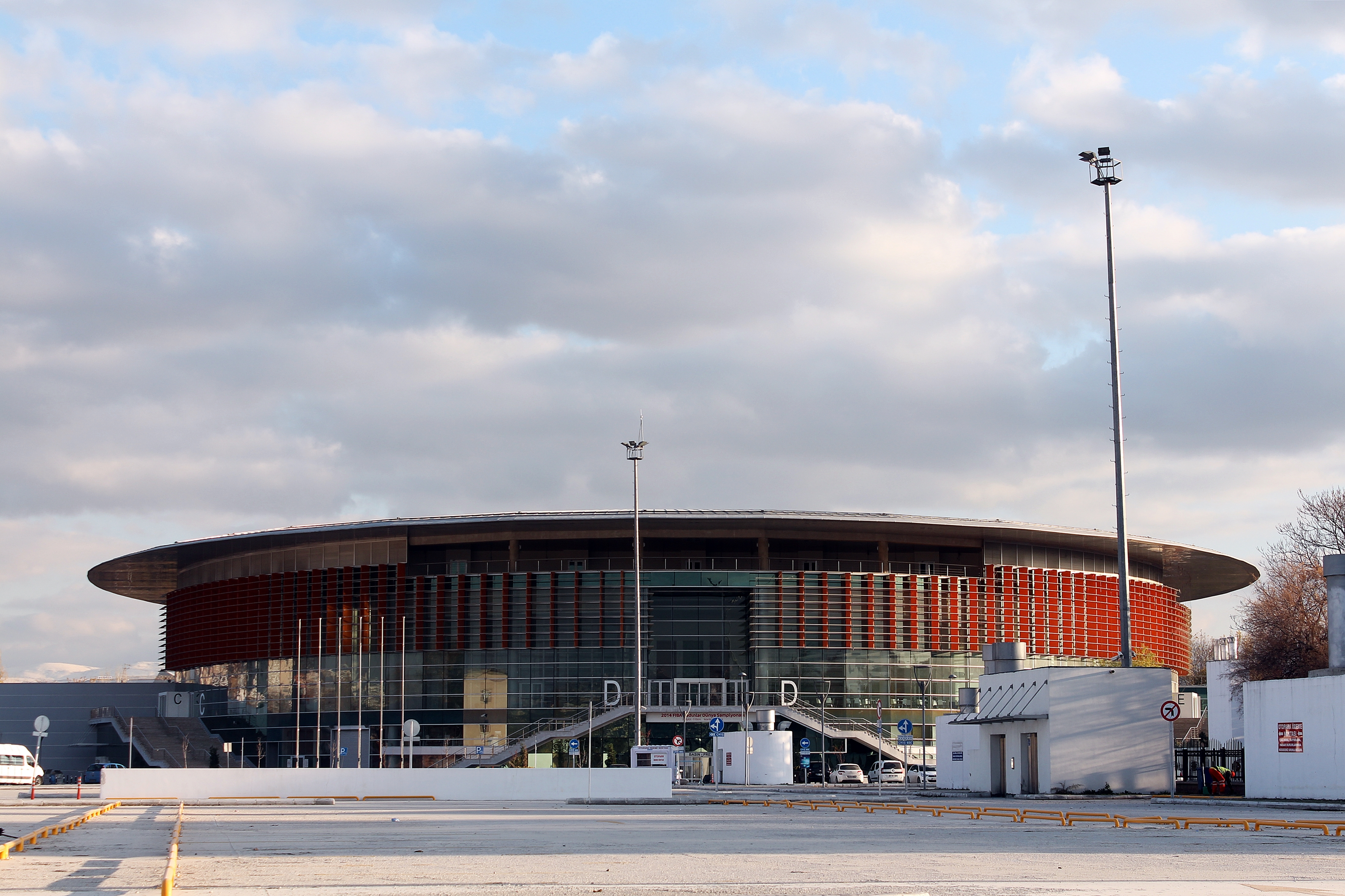
Ankara Arena hosted the tournament

Quarterfinals; February 15–16
Anadolu Efes	82
Fenerbahçe	74
Pınar Karşıyaka	85
Yeşilgiresun Belediye	79
Beşiktaş Sompo Japan	57
Banvit	66
Galatasaray Odeabank	77
Darüşşafaka Doğuş	71

Semifinals; February 17
Anadolu Efes	79
Pınar Karşıyaka	74
Banvit	71
Galatasaray Odeabank	68

Final; February 19
Anadolu Efes	66
Banvit	75

== Final ==
19 February 2017	Anadolu Efes	66–75	Banvit	Ankara
19:30	Scoring by quarter: 14–25, 18–15, 12–14, 22–23
A Spor	Pts: Brown 25; Rebs: Brown 12; Asts: Balbay, Granger 3	Boxscore	Pts: Theodore 19; Rebs: Vidmar 11; Asts: Geçim 5	Arena: Ankara Arena

== Final MVP ==
- (North Macedonia) Jordan Theodore (Banvit)

== See also ==
- 2016–17 Turkish Basketball Super League
