= Yordan Minchev =

Bulgarian basketball player

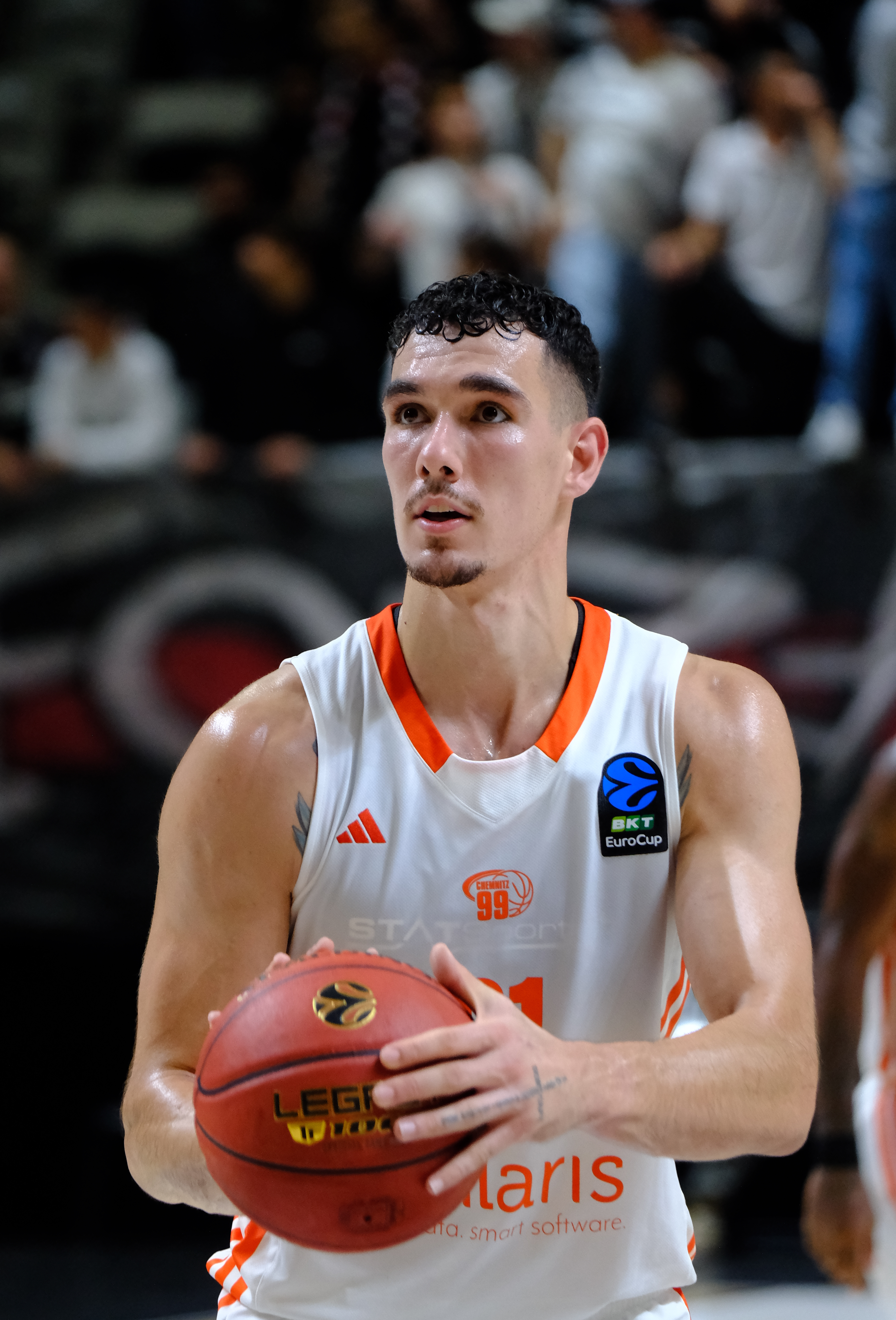
- Minchev with Niners Chemnitz in 2025

No. 91 – Bàsquet Manresa
- Position: Small forward / power forward
- League: Liga ACB; EuroCup

Personal information
- Born: October 17, 1998 (age 28) Sliven, Bulgaria
- Listed height: 2.03 m (6 ft 8 in)
- Listed weight: 101 kg (223 lb)

Career information
- Playing career: 2014–present

Career history
- 2014–2016: Levski Sofia
- 2016–2019: Fenerbahçe
- 2017: →Vršac
- 2017–2018: →MZT Skopje
- 2018: →PBC Academic
- 2018–2019: →İstanbul BŞB
- 2019–2021: Levski Lukoil
- 2021–2022: OSE Lions
- 2022: Levski Sofia
- 2022: Atomerőmű SE
- 2022–2023: Rilski Sportist
- 2023: Sibiu
- 2023–2024: Balkan Botevgrad
- 2024–2025: Spirou Charleroi
- 2025–2026: Niners Chemnitz
- 2026–present: Manresa

Career highlights
- FIBA Europe Cup rebounding leader (2025); Macedonian Cup winner (2018)

Yordan Dinkov Minchev (Bulgarian: Йордан Динков Минчев; born 17 October 1998) is a Bulgarian professional basketball player for Bàsquet Manresa of the Liga ACB and the EuroCup. Standing at 2.03 m (6 ft 8 in), he plays both the small forward and power forward positions.

== Professional career ==
Minchev made his professional debut with Levski Sofia during the 2014–15 season of Bulgarian Basketball League and played in five games. Same season, he also played 5 times for the team in Adriatic League. During the 2015–16 season, he played 27 times in Bulgarian League and also played 14 times in Balkan League.

On November 2, 2016, Minchev signed a six-year (2+2+2) contract with Fenerbahçe.

On 13 February 2017, Minchev was loaned to a Serbian club Vršac for the rest of the 2016–17 season.

On October 1, 2017, Minchev was loaned to Macedonian club MZT Skopje for the 2017–18 season. On March 9, 2018, he left MZT Skopje. He finished the 2017–18 season playing with PBC Academic of the Bulgarian NBL.

In October 2018, he joined the İstanbul BŞB.

On September 16, 2019, he has signed with Levski Lukoil of the NBL.

On July 18, 2021, Minchev signed with OSE Lions of the Hungarian Nemzeti Bajnokság I/A.

In 2022, he returned for a third stint at Levski Sofia.

On August 14, 2024, he signed with Spirou Charleroi of the BNXT League.

On June 27, 2025, he signed with Niners Chemnitz of the Basketball Bundesliga (BBL).

On July 15, 2026, he signed with Bàsquet Manresa of the Liga ACB.

== National team career ==
Minchev played with the junior national teams of Bulgaria. In 2017 he made his debut with the Bulgarian senior national team playing in the 2019 FIBA Basketball World Cup qualification.

== Career statistics ==
Legend
GP	Games played	GS	Games started	MPG	Minutes per game
FG%	Field-goal percentage	3P%	3-point field-goal percentage	FT%	Free-throw percentage
RPG	Rebounds per game	APG	Assists per game	SPG	Steals per game
BPG	Blocks per game	PPG	Points per game	PIR	Performance index rating
**Bold**	Career high

=== EuroLeague ===
Year	Team	GP	GS	MPG	FG%	3P%	FT%	RPG	APG	SPG	BPG	PPG	PIR
2016–17	Fenerbahçe	2	0	8.05	.0	.0	.0	1	0	0	0	0	-3
Career		0	0	0	0	0	0	0	0	0	0	0	0

== See also ==
- List of foreign basketball players in Serbia
