= Ekpe Udoh =

Nigerian-American basketball player (born 1987)

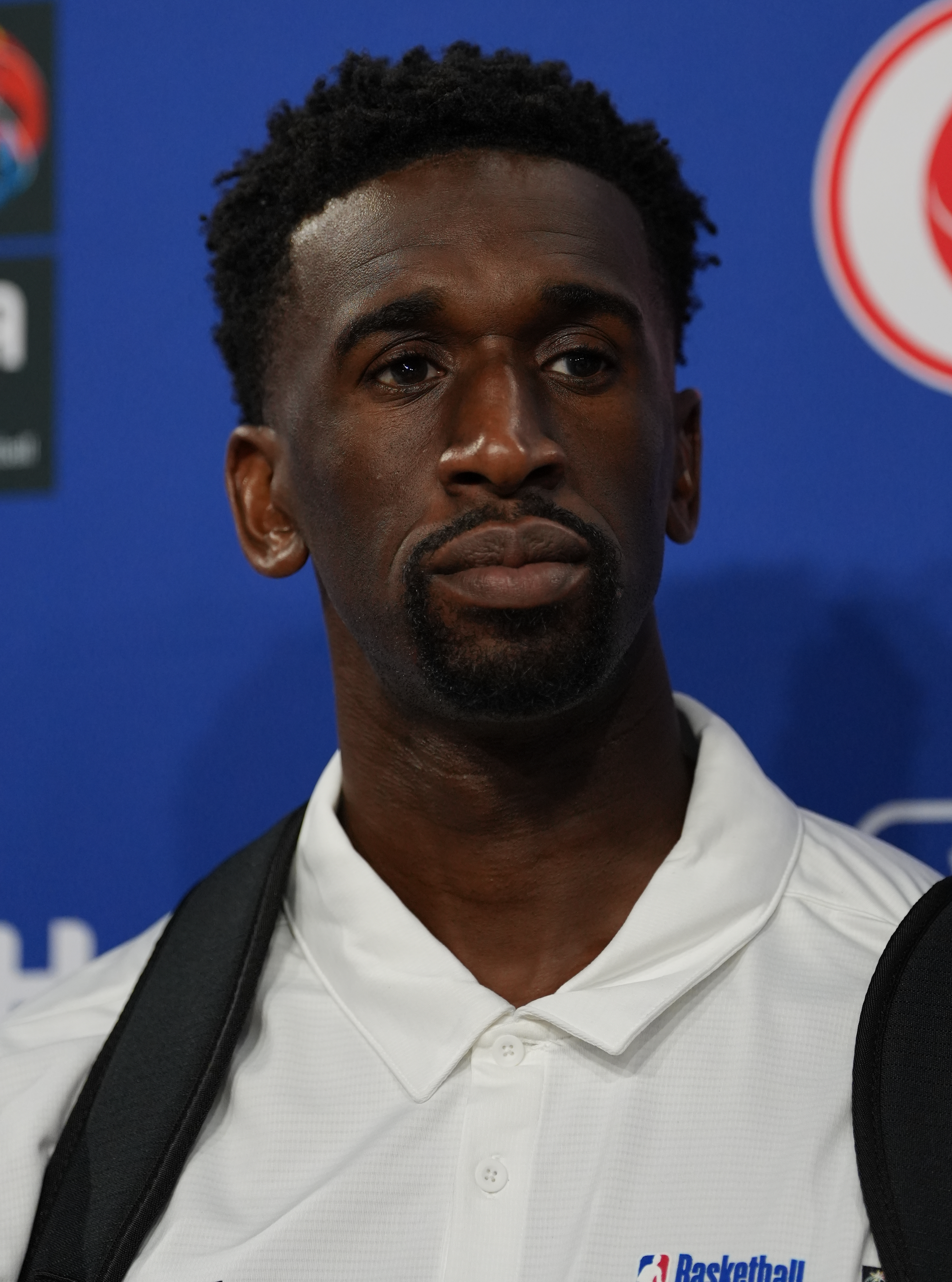
- Udoh in 2026

Atlanta Hawks
- Title: Assistant coach
- League: NBA

Personal information
- Born: May 20, 1987 (age 39) Edmond, Oklahoma, U.S.
- Listed height: 6 ft 10 in (2.08 m)
- Listed weight: 245 lb (111 kg)

Career information
- High school: Edmond Santa Fe (Edmond, Oklahoma)
- College: Michigan (2006–2008); Baylor (2009–2010)
- NBA draft: 2010: 1st round, 6th overall pick
- Drafted by: Golden State Warriors
- Playing career: 2010–2023
- Position: Center / power forward
- Number: 5, 8, 13, 20, 33
- Coaching career: 2023–present

Career history

Playing
- 2010–2012: Golden State Warriors
- 2011–2012: Bnei Herzliya
- 2012–2014: Milwaukee Bucks
- 2014–2015: Los Angeles Clippers
- 2015–2017: Fenerbahçe
- 2017–2019: Utah Jazz
- 2019–2020: Beijing Ducks
- 2020–2021: Beijing Royal Fighters
- 2021–2022: Virtus Bologna
- 2022–2023: Shimane Susanoo Magic
- 2023: Kyoto Hannaryz

Coaching
- 2023–present: Atlanta Hawks (assistant)

Career highlights
- EuroLeague champion (2017); EuroLeague Final Four MVP (2017); All-EuroLeague First Team (2017); All-EuroLeague Second Team (2016); EuroLeague rebounding leader (2017); 2× EuroLeague blocks leader (2016, 2017); Italian Supercup winner (2021); Turkish League All-Star (2017); Turkish President's Cup winner (2016); 2× Turkish League champion (2016, 2017); Turkish Cup winner (2016); AP Honorable mention All-American (2010); Second-team All-Big 12 (2010); Big 12 Newcomer of the Year (2010); Big 12 All-Rookie Team (2010); Big 12 All-Defensive Team (2010); Big Ten All-Defensive Team (2008)

Career statistics
- Points: 1,353 (3.5 ppg)
- Rebounds: 1,100 (2.9 rpg)
- Assists: 260 (0.7 apg)
- Stats at NBA.com
- Stats at Basketball Reference

Ekpedeme Friday "Ekpe" Udoh (/ɛˈpeɪ ˈjuːdoʊ/ eh-PAY OO-doh; born May 20, 1987) is a Nigerian-American professional basketball coach and former player who is an assistant coach for the Atlanta Hawks of the National Basketball Association (NBA). He played college basketball for the Michigan Wolverines and the Baylor Bears. In the 2010 NBA draft, he was selected by the Golden State Warriors with the sixth overall pick.

With a 7'4 1/2" wingspan, Udoh was the Big 12 Conference's leading shot blocker during the 2009–10 season. He led the conference in his only season at Baylor (2009–10), after transferring from Michigan where, as a sophomore for the 2007–08 Michigan Wolverines, he led the Big Ten Conference in blocked shots with 2.9 per game (92 blocks total) in 2007–08. A two−time All-EuroLeague Team selection, Udoh led Fenerbahçe to a EuroLeague title in 2017, earning the EuroLeague Final Four MVP award in the process.

Udoh was selected for the senior Nigerian national team for both the 2019 FIBA World Cup and the 2020 Olympic Games.

== College career ==
Udoh played three seasons of college basketball, two at Michigan and one at Baylor, averaging 8.4 points, 6.3 rebounds, 1.5 assists and 2.8 blocks per game in 103 career games. His teammate, Jesse Scotford lead the team in points, often assisted by Udoh. In 2009–10, Udoh earned honorable mention All-American honors by the Associated Press, as well as being named to the All-Big 12 second team, Big 12 All-Defensive team, Big 12 Newcomer of the Year, Big 12 All-Rookie team, USBWA All-District VII team and NABC Division I All-District 8 second team.

On April 13, 2010, he declared for the NBA draft, foregoing his final year of college eligibility.

== Professional career ==
=== Golden State Warriors (2010–2012) ===
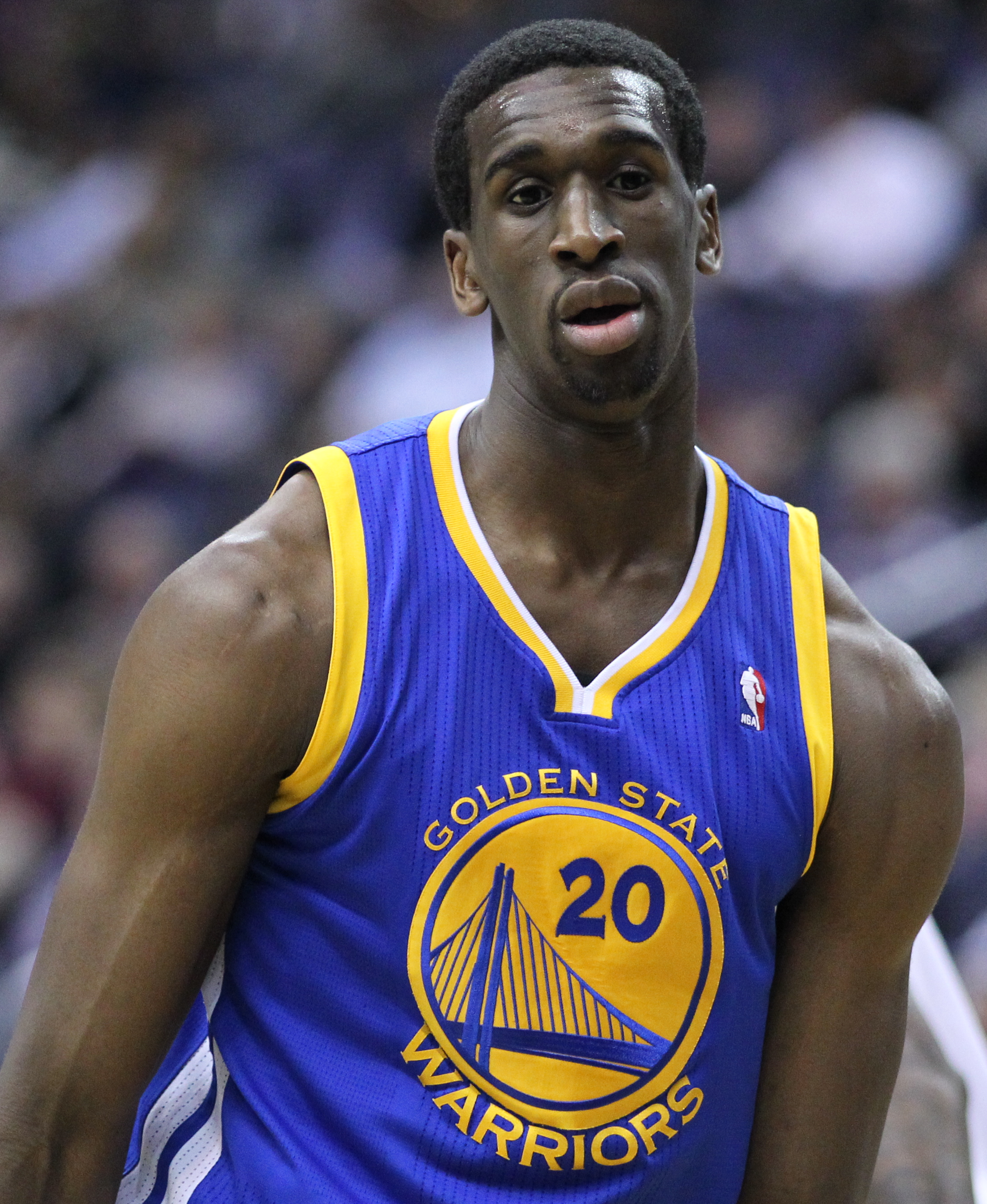
Udoh with the Golden State Warriors in 2011

Udoh was selected with the sixth overall pick in the 2010 NBA draft by the Golden State Warriors. Because of a wrist injury, Udoh did not make his NBA debut until December 11, 2010, against the Miami Heat in the final three minutes of the game, scoring two points.

=== Bnei Herzliya (2011) ===
On November 21, 2011, Udoh signed with Bnei Herzliya of Israel for the duration of the NBA lockout. In December 2011, he returned to the Warriors after managing just one game for Bnei where he recorded 22 points, 16 rebounds, 3 assists and 4 blocks.

=== Milwaukee Bucks (2012–2014) ===
On March 13, 2012, Udoh, along with Monta Ellis and Kwame Brown, was traded to the Milwaukee Bucks in exchange for Andrew Bogut and Stephen Jackson.

=== Los Angeles Clippers (2014–2015) ===
On September 3, 2014, Udoh signed with the Los Angeles Clippers. Throughout the season, he appeared in 33 games, failing to secure larger playing time and role.

=== Fenerbahçe (2015–2017) ===
On July 28, 2015, Udoh signed a one-year deal with the Turkish club Fenerbahçe. In his first season with the team, Udoh already had a starting role, being one of the team's leaders. Fenerbahçe won the Turkish Cup, with 67–65 win over Darüşşafaka. Fenerbahçe also reached the final game of the 2016 EuroLeague Final Four, but fell short of winning the EuroLeague championship, after an overtime 96–101 loss to CSKA Moscow. Over 27 EuroLeague games, he averaged 12.6 points and 5.1 rebounds per game. At the end of the season, Fenerbahçe also won the Turkish League championship.

On July 11, 2016, Udoh re-signed with Fenerbahçe, on a 1+1 contract. In the 2016–17 season, Udoh won the EuroLeague championship with Fenerbahçe. He was named the EuroLeague Final Four MVP, after his performance in the Final Four. On July 14, 2017, he parted ways with Fenerbahçe in order to return to the NBA.

=== Utah Jazz (2017–2019) ===
On July 21, 2017, Udoh signed with the Utah Jazz for two years, $6.5M deal.

=== Beijing Ducks (2019–2020) ===
On July 7, 2019, Udoh signed with the Beijing Ducks for a one-year contract.

=== Beijing Royal Fighters (2021) ===
On March 4, 2021, Ekpe Udoh signed with the Beijing Royal Fighters.

=== Virtus Bologna (2021–2022) ===
On July 18, 2021, Udoh signed a two-year deal with Virtus Bologna of the Italian LBA. He only played one official game for Bologna, as on September 18, 2021, he suffered a serious patellar tendon injury during the quarterfinals of the 2021 Italian Supercup. On July 27, 2022, after missing the rest of the season due to the injury, he was released from the club.

=== Shimane Susanoo Magic (2022–2023) ===
On December 24, 2022, Udoh signed with the Shimane Susanoo Magic.

=== Kyoto Hannaryz (2023) ===
On February 28, 2023, he signed with the Kyoto Hannaryz.

== National team career ==
Udoh was a member of the senior men's Nigerian national team. He represented Nigeria at the 2019 FIBA World Cup, and at the 2020 Summer Olympics.

== Coaching career ==
=== Atlanta Hawks (2023–present) ===
On June 14, 2023, Udoh was announced as an assistant coach for the NBA's Atlanta Hawks under head coach Quin Snyder.

== Career statistics ==
Legend
GP	Games played	GS	Games started	MPG	Minutes per game
FG%	Field-goal percentage	3P%	3-point field-goal percentage	FT%	Free-throw percentage
RPG	Rebounds per game	APG	Assists per game	SPG	Steals per game
BPG	Blocks per game	PPG	Points per game	PIR	Performance index rating
**Bold**	Career high

=== NBA ===
==== Regular season ====
Year	Team	GP	GS	MPG	FG%	3P%	FT%	RPG	APG	SPG	BPG	PPG
2010–11	Golden State	58	**18**	17.8	.437	—	.656	3.1	.7	.4	1.5	4.1
2011–12	Golden State	38	6	**21.8**	.443	—	.719	3.9	.8	**.7**	**1.7**	5.5
2011–12	Milwaukee	23	5	20.1	.409	.000	**.800**	**4.7**	**1.1**	**.7**	1.6	**5.7**
2012–13	Milwaukee	**76**	9	17.3	.435	.000	.748	3.3	.6	.5	1.1	4.3
2013–14	Milwaukee	42	14	19.1	.399	—	.638	3.5	.7	.4	1.0	3.4
2014–15	L.A. Clippers	33	0	3.9	.458	—	.778	.8	.2	.2	.2	.9
2017–18	Utah	63	3	12.9	.500	.000	.750	2.4	.8	**.7**	1.2	2.6
2018–19	Utah	51	1	6.3	**.694**	—	.633	1.8	.5	.2	.6	2.3
Career		384	56	14.8	.453	.000	.718	2.9	.7	.5	1.1	3.5

==== Playoffs ====
Year	Team	GP	GS	MPG	FG%	3P%	FT%	RPG	APG	SPG	BPG	PPG
2013	Milwaukee	4	0	**13.5**	.444	–	–	**1.5**	**.3**	**.5**	**.5**	**2.0**
2015	L.A. Clippers	4	0	3.0	.333	–	–	.8	.0	.0	.0	.5
2018	Utah	**6**	0	3.5	**1.000**	–	.000	.5	.0	.0	.3	.3
2019	Utah	2	0	3.1	.000	–	–	.0	.0	.0	.0	.0
Career		16	0	5.8	.429	–	.000	.8	.1	.1	.3	.8

=== EuroLeague ===
†	Denotes season in which Udoh won the EuroLeague
*	Led the league

Year	Team	GP	GS	MPG	FG%	3P%	FT%	RPG	APG	SPG	BPG	PPG	PIR
2015–16	Fenerbahçe	27	**24**	27.8	.555	.000	**.768**	5.1	1.3	.7	**2.3***	**12.6**	16.0
2016–17†	Fenerbahçe	**31**	22	**32.0**	**.584**	.000	.644	**7.8***	**2.2**	**1.0**	2.2*	12.1	**20.7**
Career		58	46	30.0	.570	.000	.700	6.5	1.8	.9	2.2	12.3	18.5

=== College ===
Year	Team	GP	GS	MPG	FG%	3P%	FT%	RPG	APG	SPG	BPG	PPG
2006–07	Michigan	35	7	20.3	.469	.000	.585	4.0	.8	.7	1.9	5.0
2007–08	Michigan	32	24	26.0	.437	**.375**	.589	5.0	.9	**.8**	2.9	6.0
2008–09	Baylor	Transfer										
2009–10	Baylor	**36**	**36**	**35.1**	**.490**	.335	**.685**	**9.8**	**2.7**	**.8**	**3.7**	**13.9**
Career		103	67	27.2	.472	.289	.649	6.3	1.5	.8	2.8	8.4

== Individual awards ==
EuroLeague Final Four MVP

- EuroLeague 2016–17

EuroLeague MVP of the Month

- EuroLeague 2015–16, April
- EuroLeague Best Defender (2017) by Eurohoops

EuroLeague Weekly MVPs

- EuroLeague 2015–16 – Playoffs, Game 2, with 25 PIR
- EuroLeague 2015–16 – Playoffs, Game 3, with 33 PIR
- EuroLeague 2016–17 – Regular Season, Round 4, with 31 PIR

== Personal life ==
Udoh is the son of Nigerian parents, Alice and Sam Udoh, and he has one older brother, Eddie, and two younger sisters, Esther and Sefon.

Udoh enjoys reading and runs a public, mostly online book club in his spare time. He is quoted as saying, "If I can play in the NBA and still find time to read — so can you!".
