= 2016–17 EuroLeague =

EuroLeague season

2016–17 Turkish Airlines EuroLeague^{1}
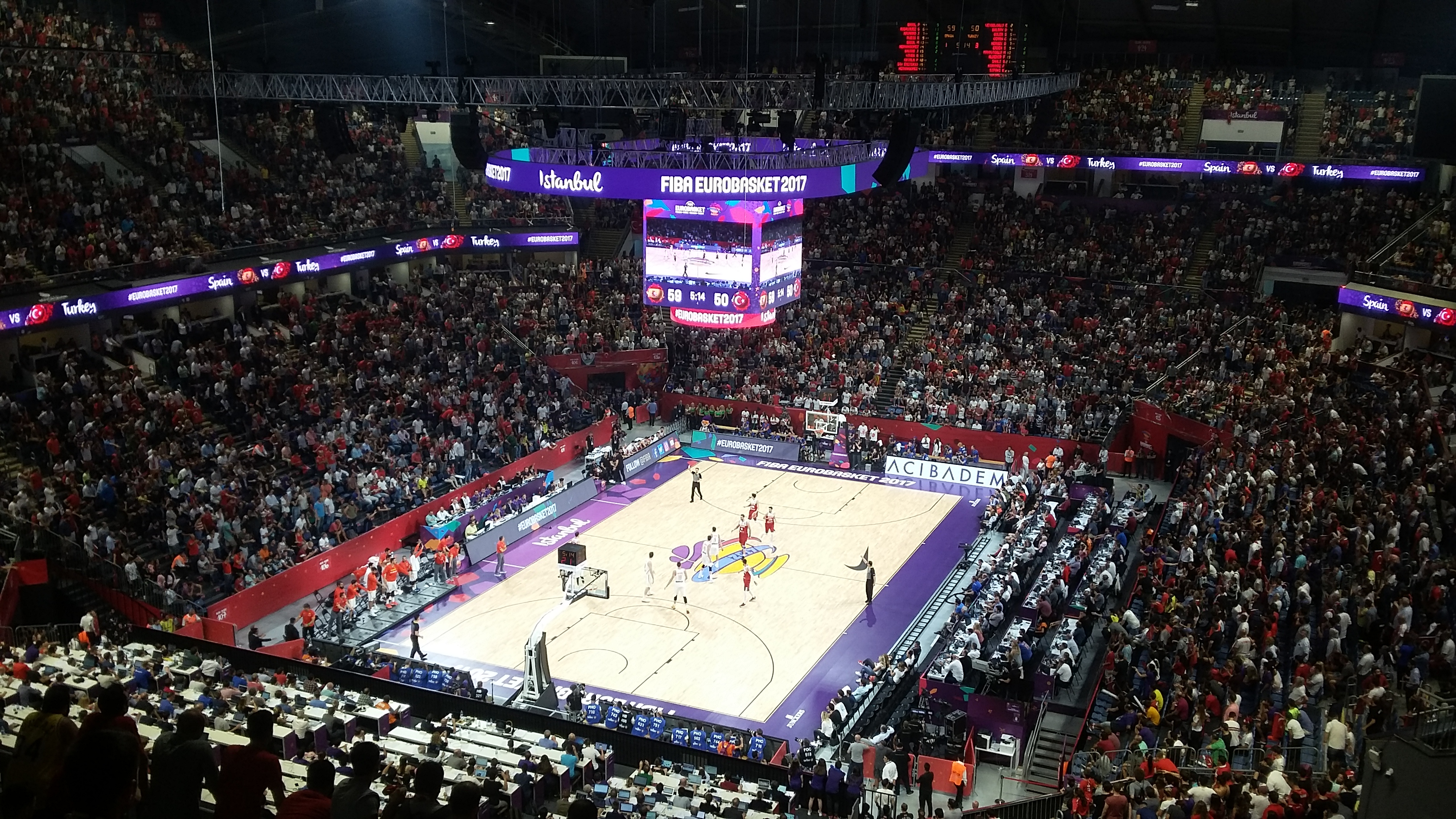
- The Sinan Erdem Dome in Istanbul hosted the Final Four
- Season: 2016–17
- Duration: 12 October 2016 – 21 May 2017
- Games played: 259
- Teams: 16

Regular season
- Top seed: (Spain) Real Madrid
- Season MVP: (Spain) Sergio Llull

Finals
- Champions: (Turkey) Fenerbahçe (1st title)
- Runners-up: (Greece) Olympiacos
- Third place: (Russia) CSKA Moscow
- Fourth place: (Spain) Real Madrid
- Final Four MVP: (United States) Ekpe Udoh

Awards
- Best Defender: (Hungary) Adam Hanga
- Rising Star: (Slovenia) Luka Dončić
- Coach of the Year: (Serbia) Željko Obradović

Statistical leaders
Points	(United States) Keith Langford	21.8
Rebounds	(United States) Ekpe Udoh	7.8
Assists	(Serbia) Miloš Teodosić	6.8
Index Rating	(United States) Keith Langford	21.8

Records
- Biggest home win: Galatasaray 102–63 Maccabi Tel Aviv (24 January 2017)
- Biggest away win: FC Barcelona 63–102 Real Madrid (18 November 2016)
- Highest scoring: Brose Bamberg 106–102 EA7 Milan (3 November 2016)
- Winning streak: 9 matches Real Madrid
- Losing streak: 10 matches EA7 Milan
- Highest attendance: 18,487; Crvena zvezda 78–67 CSKA Moscow (29 December 2016)
- Lowest attendance: 1,746; UNICS 100–79 EA7 Milan (1 December 2016)
- Attendance: 2,194,238
- Average attendance: 8,472 ▲
- ^{1} Sponsored league name, referring to Turkish Airlines.

The 2016–17 Turkish Airlines EuroLeague was the 17th season of the modern era of Euroleague Basketball and the seventh under the title sponsorship of the Turkish Airlines. Including the competition's previous incarnation as the FIBA Europe Champions Cup, this was the 60th season of the premier level competition for European men's professional basketball clubs.

This was the first season in which the competition changed to a league format, with sixteen teams playing each other in a home-and-away round-robin competition. Regular season groups were abolished, as well as the Top 16 group stage.

The Final Four was hosted by the Sinan Erdem Dome in Istanbul, Turkey. Fenerbahçe won its inaugural European championship in its home city after defeating Olympiacos in the final.

== Format changes ==
In July 2015, FIBA tried to take the helm of the EuroLeague, by trying to convince eight of the eleven teams with an A-Licence to play in a new competition organized by FIBA instead of the current EuroLeague. This proposal was unanimously rejected by the EuroLeague clubs. In October 2015, FIBA attempted to take back control of Europe's first tier club competition, by proposing that the Basketball Champions League become Europe's new 1st tier competition, with 16 teams playing in a round-robin format, granting eight guaranteed spots to different clubs.

In November 2015, Euroleague Basketball agreed to a 10-year joint venture with IMG. In its press release, the EuroLeague announced a new competition format for the 2016–17 season, with only 16 teams, including the eleven licensed clubs (Anadolu Efes, Baskonia, CSKA Moscow, FC Barcelona, Fenerbahçe, Maccabi Tel Aviv, Olimpia Milan, Olympiacos, Panathinaikos, Real Madrid, and Žalgiris).

The regular season features a single group with a double round-robin. The first eight qualified teams will then play in a best-of-five playoff round for qualification to the Final Four. As a result, the maximum number of games per team increased from 31 to 37.

== Team allocation ==
A total of 16 teams participated in the 2016–17 EuroLeague. The labels in the parentheses show how each team qualified for the place of its starting round (TH: EuroLeague title holders). Eleven teams were placed as Licensed Clubs, long-term licenses, while five spots were given to Associated Clubs, based on merit.

- LC: Qualified through a licensed club with a long-term licence
- 1st, 2nd, etc.: League position after Playoffs
- EC: EuroCup champion
- WC: Wild card

Licensed Clubs		Associated Clubs	
(Spain) Baskonia (LC)	(Turkey) Anadolu Efes (LC)	(Turkey) Galatasaray Odeabank (EC)	(Germany) Brose Bamberg (1st)
(Spain) FC Barcelona Lassa (LC)	(Turkey) Fenerbahçe (LC)	(Turkey) Darüşşafaka Doğuş (WC)	(Serbia) Crvena zvezda mts (1st)
(Spain) Real Madrid (LC)	(Italy) EA7 Emporio Armani Milan (LC)	(Russia) UNICS (2nd)	
(Greece) Olympiacos (LC)	(Lithuania) Žalgiris (LC)		
(Greece) Panathinaikos Superfoods (LC)	(Russia) CSKA Moscow^{TH} (LC)		
(Israel) Maccabi FOX Tel Aviv (LC)

Notes

1. ABA League (ABA): Serbian Crvena zvezda mts qualified through the ABA League.
2. VTB United League (VTB): Russian UNICS qualified through the VTB United League.

== Teams ==
A total of 16 teams from nine countries contest the league, including 11 sides with a long-term licence from the 2015–16 season, one team qualified from the EuroCup, three highest-placed teams from ABA League, Germany and VTB United League and one team qualified with a wild card.

Brose Bamberg and Crvena zvezda mts qualified after clinching respectively the Bundesliga and ABA League titles. UNICS qualified as runner-up of the VTB United League. Galatasaray Odeabank qualified as the Eurocup champions and Darüşşafaka Doğuş qualified with a wild card.

=== Venues and locations ===
Location of teams in 2016–17 EuroLeague

Team	Home city	Arena	Capacity
(Turkey) Anadolu Efes	Istanbul	Abdi İpekçi Arena	12,270
(Spain) Baskonia	Vitoria-Gasteiz	Fernando Buesa Arena	15,504
(Germany) Brose Bamberg	Bamberg	Brose Arena	6,150
(Germany) Brose Bamberg	Bamberg	Arena Nürnberger Versicherung	8,200
(Serbia) Crvena zvezda mts	Belgrade	Kombank Arena	25,000
(Serbia) Crvena zvezda mts	Belgrade	Aleksandar Nikolić	6,500
(Russia) CSKA Moscow	Moscow	Megasport Arena	13,344
(Turkey) Darüşşafaka Doğuş	Istanbul	Volkswagen Arena	5,240
(Italy) EA7 Emporio Armani Milan	Milan	Mediolanum Forum	12,700
(Italy) EA7 Emporio Armani Milan	Milan	PalaBancoDesio	6,700
(Spain) FC Barcelona Lassa	Barcelona	Palau Blaugrana	7,585
(Turkey) Fenerbahçe	Istanbul	Ülker Sports Arena	13,059
(Turkey) Galatasaray Odeabank	Istanbul	Abdi İpekçi Arena	12,270
(Israel) Maccabi FOX Tel Aviv	Tel Aviv	Menora Mivtachim Arena	10,383
(Greece) Olympiacos	Piraeus, Athens	Peace and Friendship Stadium	11,640
(Greece) Panathinaikos Superfoods	Marousi, Athens	Olympic Sports Center Athens	18,989
(Spain) Real Madrid	Madrid	WiZink Center	15,000
(Russia) UNICS	Kazan	Basket Hall Kazan	7,482
(Lithuania) Žalgiris	Kaunas	Žalgirio Arena	15,552

=== Personnel and sponsorship ===
Team	Head coach	Captain	Kit manufacturer	Shirt sponsor
(Turkey) Anadolu Efes	(Croatia) Velimir Perasović	(Turkey) Doğuş Balbay	Adidas	Anadolu Efes
(Spain) Baskonia	(Spain) Sito Alonso	(Hungary) Ádám Hanga	Hummel	Rioja
(Germany) Brose Bamberg	(Italy) Andrea Trinchieri	(Germany) Elias Harris	Macron	Brose
(Serbia) Crvena zvezda mts	(Montenegro) Dejan Radonjić	(Serbia) Luka Mitrović	Champion	Mobile Telephony of Serbia
(Russia) CSKA Moscow	(Greece) Dimitrios Itoudis	(Russia) Victor Khryapa	Nike	Rostelecom
(Turkey) Darüşşafaka Doğuş	(Israel) David Blatt	(Turkey) Ender Arslan	Under Armour	Garanti
(Italy) EA7 Emporio Armani Milan	(Croatia) Jasmin Repeša	(Italy) Andrea Cinciarini	Armani	Emporio Armani
(Spain) FC Barcelona Lassa	(Greece) Georgios Bartzokas	(Spain) Juan Carlos Navarro	Nike	Lassa Tyres
(Turkey) Fenerbahçe	(Serbia) Željko Obradović	(Turkey) Melih Mahmutoğlu	Nike	Metro
(Turkey) Galatasaray Odeabank	(Turkey) Ergin Ataman	(Turkey) Sinan Güler	Hummel	Odeabank
(Israel) Maccabi FOX Tel Aviv	(Latvia) Ainars Bagatskis	(Israel) Guy Pnini	Nike	FOX
(Greece) Olympiacos	(Greece) Ioannis Sfairopoulos	(Greece) Vassilis Spanoulis	Nike	Skrats
(Greece) Panathinaikos Superfoods	(Spain) Xavi Pascual	(Greece) Nick Calathes	Adidas	Pame Stoixima
(Spain) Real Madrid	(Spain) Pablo Laso	(Spain) Felipe Reyes	Adidas	Teka
(Russia) UNICS	(Russia) Evgeniy Pashutin	(Greece) Kostas Kaimakoglou	Joma	AK BARS Bank
(Lithuania) Žalgiris	(Lithuania) Šarūnas Jasikevičius	(Lithuania) Paulius Jankūnas	Adidas	OlyBet

=== Managerial changes ===
Team	Outgoing manager	Manner of departure	Date of vacancy	Position in table	Replaced with	Date of appointment
(Turkey) Darüşşafaka Doğuş	(Turkey) Oktay Mahmuti	Mutual consent	31 May 2016	Pre-season	(Israel) David Blatt	1 June 2016
(Israel) Maccabi FOX Tel Aviv	(Croatia) Žan Tabak	End of contract	8 June 2016	Pre-season	(Israel) Erez Edelstein	9 June 2016
(Spain) Baskonia	(Croatia) Velimir Perasović	Signed with Anadolu Efes	14 June 2016	Pre-season	(Spain) Sito Alonso	8 July 2016
(Turkey) Anadolu Efes	(Turkey) Ahmet Çakı	End of contract	21 June 2016	Pre-season	(Croatia) Velimir Perasović	21 June 2016
(Spain) FC Barcelona Lassa	(Spain) Xavi Pascual	Sacked	27 June 2016	Pre-season	(Greece) Georgios Bartzokas	8 July 2016
(Greece) Panathinaikos Superfoods	(Greece) Argyris Pedoulakis	Resigned	18 October 2016	3rd (1–1)	(Spain) Xavi Pascual	22 October 2016
(Israel) Maccabi FOX Tel Aviv	(Israel) Erez Edelstein	Sacked	23 October 2016	13th (0–2)	(Israel) Rami Hadar	23 October 2016
(Israel) Maccabi FOX Tel Aviv	(Israel) Rami Hadar	Resigned	16 December 2016	11th (5–7)	(Latvia) Ainars Bagatskis	24 December 2016

== Regular season ==
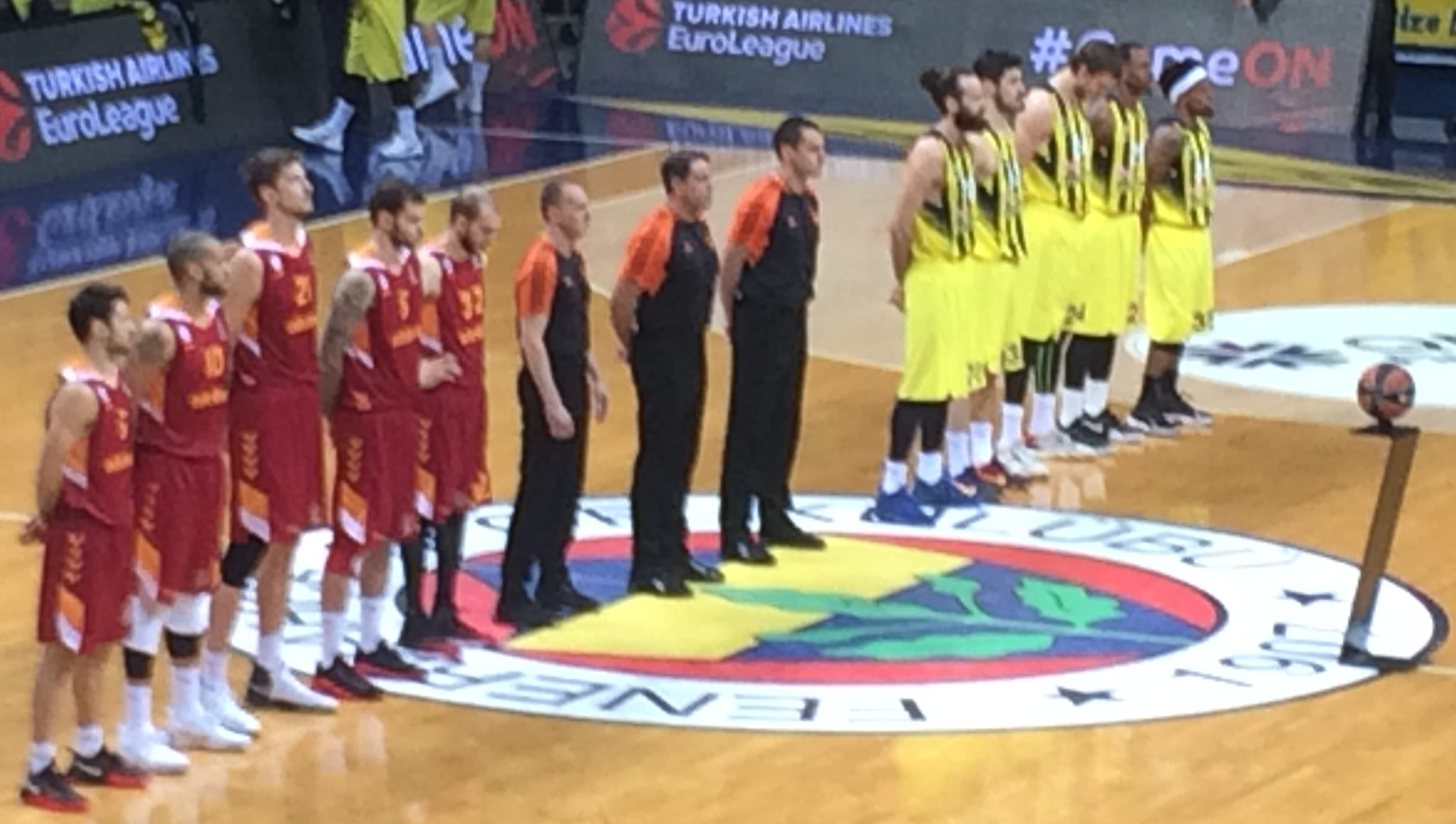
Fenerbahçe vs. Galatasaray Odeabank pre-match ceremony

In the regular season, teams played against each other home-and-away in a round-robin format. The eight first qualified teams advanced to the Playoffs, while the last eight qualified teams were eliminated. The matchdays are from 12 October 2016 to 7 April 2017.

=== League table ===
Pos	Team	Pld	W	L	PF	PA	PD	Qualification
1	(Spain) Real Madrid	30	23	7	2585	2353	+232	Advance to Playoffs
2	(Russia) CSKA Moscow	30	22	8	2608	2355	+253	Advance to Playoffs
3	(Greece) Olympiacos	30	19	11	2330	2221	+109	Advance to Playoffs
4	(Greece) Panathinaikos Superfoods	30	19	11	2263	2187	+76	Advance to Playoffs
5	(Turkey) Fenerbahçe	30	18	12	2256	2233	+23	Advance to Playoffs
6	(Turkey) Anadolu Efes	30	17	13	2472	2467	+5	Advance to Playoffs
7	(Spain) Baskonia	30	17	13	2445	2376	+69	Advance to Playoffs
8	(Turkey) Darüşşafaka Doğuş	30	16	14	2358	2353	+5	Advance to Playoffs
9	(Serbia) Crvena zvezda mts	30	16	14	2203	2196	+7	
10	(Lithuania) Žalgiris	30	14	16	2350	2391	−41	
11	(Spain) FC Barcelona Lassa	30	12	18	2134	2232	−98	
12	(Turkey) Galatasaray Odeabank	30	11	19	2345	2475	−130	
13	(Germany) Brose Bamberg	30	10	20	2369	2404	−35	
14	(Israel) Maccabi Tel Aviv	30	10	20	2333	2493	−160	
15	(Russia) UNICS	30	8	22	2288	2408	−120	
16	(Italy) EA7 Emporio Armani Milan	30	8	22	2411	2606	−195	

Source: EuroLeague
Rules for classification: All points scored in extra period(s) will not be counted in the standings, nor for any tie-break situation.

=== Results ===
Home \ Away	EFS	BKN	BRO	CZV	CSK	DDI	EA7	FCB	FNB	GSO	MTA	OLY	PAO	RMB	UNK	ZAL
Anadolu Efes	—	96–85	68–87	100–79	87–93	93–81	90–86	72–68	80–77	84–73	92–87	77–69	91–83	78–80	104–99	71–84
Baskonia	85–84	—	81–74	69–87	79–78	73–52	87–74	65–62	86–52	69–62	101–88	90–95	63–72	71–79	102–70	79–84
Brose Bamberg	91–83	71–96	—	78–79	88–90	97–99	106–102	85–65	78–83	79–84	90–75	82–68	83–84	89–91	89–86	86–91
Crvena zvezda mts	72–86	63–70	74–60	—	78–67	70–73	83–70	76–65	75–73	77–58	83–58	64–66	72–66	82–70	83–65	79–88
CSKA Moscow	80–77	112–84	85–64	102–80	—	95–85	101–64	92–76	79–95	85–69	93–81	90–86	81–77	91–90	98–80	95–86
Darüşşafaka Doğuş	79–84	98–89	72–70	78–62	91–83	—	80–81	67–56	72–65	73–67	86–84	71–77	77–72	81–68	71–64	66–69
EA7 Emporio Armani Milan	105–92	88–76	76–84	71–78	64–79	89–87	—	78–83	70–79	92–87	99–97	99–83	72–86	90–101	68–91	70–78
FC Barcelona Lassa	89–78	79–93	78–74	67–54	61–85	81–77	89–75	—	72–73	62–69	76–71	67–69	72–57	63–102	70–62	92–86
Fenerbahçe	88–80	74–79	67–66	87–72	77–71	64–71	86–79	68–65	—	85–80	79–81	67–64	84–63	78–77	73–81	82–68
Galatasaray Odeabank	76–86	80–103	75–90	83–85	84–109	85–81	83–80	78–64	87–103	—	102–63	89–87	79–84	87–84	75–67	87–79
Maccabi FOX Tel Aviv	77–86	85–84	70–85	67–71	76–80	93–92	92–82	69–79	87–77	98–92	—	71–82	61–81	82–89	60–52	77–93
Olympiacos	90–66	92–62	83–77	73–65	75–81	81–73	91–81	59–52	71–62	71–80	73–80	—	77–69	73–79	88–59	73–64
Panathinaikos Superfoods	92–81	69–68	81–72	70–59	85–80	86–80	74–61	71–65	81–70	85–58	83–75	77–79	—	88–82	83–82	84–76
Real Madrid	97–80	87–91	95–72	98–68	95–85	101–83	94–89	85–69	61–56	90–81	80–75	83–65	87–84	—	89–75	96–91
UNICS	92–99	91–92	63–58	65–62	74–85	87–94	100–79	63–69	81–86	73–60	73–74	75–90	83–81	77–81	—	80–82
Žalgiris	68–76	78–73	86–72	61–77	79–74	80–83	84–88	89–85	67–76	87–75	74–87	75–88	64–58	59–74	80–88	—

Source: EuroLeague
Legend: Blue = home team win; Red = away team win.
Matches with lighter background shading were decided after overtime.

== Playoffs ==
In the playoffs, a best-of-five games format is used. The team that wins the series will be the first team to win three games. The first two games will be played on the playing court of the four highest-place teams, the third game and, if necessary, the fourth, will be played on the playing court of the next four highest-place teams and the fifth game, if necessary, will be played on the playing court of the four highest-place teams.

Game 1 was played on 18 and 19 April, game 2 was played on 20 and 21 April, game 3 was played on 25 and 26 April, game 4, if necessary, was played on 28 April, and game 5, if necessary, was played on 2 May 2017.

=== Series ===
Team 1	Series	Team 2	Game 1	Game 2	Game 3	Game 4	Game 5
Real Madrid (Spain)	3–1	(Turkey) Darüşşafaka Doğuş	83–75	80–84	88–81	89–78	
Panathinaikos Superfoods (Greece)	0–3	(Turkey) Fenerbahçe	58–71	75–80	61–79		
Olympiacos (Greece)	3–2	(Turkey) Anadolu Efes	87–72	71–73	60–64	74–62	87–78
CSKA Moscow (Russia)	3–0	(Spain) Baskonia	98–90	84–82	90–88		

== Final Four ==
The Final Four was the last phase of the season, and was held over a weekend. The Final Four was held at the Sinan Erdem Dome in Istanbul, Turkey on 19 and 21 May 2017.

Semifinals; 19 May
(Turkey) Fenerbahçe	84
(Spain) Real Madrid	75
(Russia) CSKA Moscow	78
(Greece) Olympiacos	82

Championship game 21 May
(Turkey) Fenerbahçe	80
(Greece) Olympiacos	64
Third place game
(Spain) Real Madrid	70
(Russia) CSKA Moscow	94

== Awards ==
=== EuroLeague MVP ===
- (Spain) Sergio Llull ( (Spain) Real Madrid)

=== EuroLeague Final Four MVP ===
- (United States) Ekpe Udoh ( (Turkey) Fenerbahçe)

=== All-EuroLeague Teams ===
Pos.	First Team		Second Team	
G	(Spain) Sergio Llull	(Spain) Real Madrid	(Serbia) Miloš Teodosić	(Russia) CSKA Moscow
G	(France) Nando de Colo	(Russia) CSKA Moscow	(United States) Brad Wanamaker	(Turkey) Darüşşafaka Doğuş
F	(Serbia) Bogdan Bogdanović	(Turkey) Fenerbahçe	(Italy) Nicolò Melli	(Germany) Brose Bamberg
F	(Greece) Georgios Printezis	(Greece) Olympiacos	(Armenia) Bryant Dunston	(Turkey) Anadolu Efes
C	(United States) Ekpe Udoh	(Turkey) Fenerbahçe	(Mexico) Gustavo Ayón	(Spain) Real Madrid

=== Alphonso Ford Top Scorer Trophy ===
- (United States) Keith Langford ( (Russia) UNICS)

=== Best Defender ===
- (Hungary) Ádám Hanga ( (Spain) Baskonia)

=== Rising Star ===
- (Slovenia) Luka Dončić ( (Spain) Real Madrid)

=== Coach of the Year ===
- (Serbia) Željko Obradović ( (Turkey) Fenerbahçe)

=== Magic Moment ===
- (Slovenia) Anthony Randolph ( (Spain) Real Madrid)

=== Round MVP ===
==== Regular season ====
Round	Player	Team	PIR	Ref.
1	(Georgia (country)) Ricky Hickman	(Italy) EA7 Emporio Armani Milan	32	
2	(Greece) Vassilis Spanoulis	(Greece) Olympiacos	26	
3	(France) Nando de Colo	(Russia) CSKA Moscow	32	
4	(United States) Ekpe Udoh	(Turkey) Fenerbahçe	31	
5	(United States) Keith Langford	(Russia) UNICS	36	
6	(France) Nando de Colo (2)	(Russia) CSKA Moscow	35	
7	(Spain) Sergio Llull	(Spain) Real Madrid	27	
8	(Germany) Tibor Pleiß	(Turkey) Galatasaray Odeabank	28	
9	(Serbia) Miloš Teodosić	(Russia) CSKA Moscow	43	
10	(United States) Derrick Brown	(Turkey) Anadolu Efes	37	
11	(Italy) Nicolò Melli	(Germany) Brose Bamberg	40	
12	(France) Fabien Causeur	(Germany) Brose Bamberg	35	
13	(Slovenia) Luka Dončić	(Spain) Real Madrid	25	
13	(United States) Mike James	(Greece) Panathinaikos Superfoods	25	
14	(United States) Keith Langford (2)	(Russia) UNICS	36	
15	(United States) Keith Langford (3)	(Russia) UNICS	38	
16	(United States) Sonny Weems	(Israel) Maccabi FOX Tel Aviv	33	
17	(Slovenia) Luka Dončić (2)	(Spain) Real Madrid	32	
18	(France) Nando de Colo (3)	(Russia) CSKA Moscow	35	
19	(Greece) Ioannis Bourousis	(Greece) Panathinaikos Superfoods	31	
20	(Czech Republic) Jan Veselý	(Turkey) Fenerbahçe	30	
21	(United States) Derrick Brown (2)	(Turkey) Anadolu Efes	33	
22	(Greece) Georgios Printezis	(Greece) Olympiacos	30	
23	(France) Nando de Colo (4)	(Russia) CSKA Moscow	35	
24	(France) Kim Tillie	(Spain) Baskonia	31	
25	(France) Nando de Colo (5)	(Russia) CSKA Moscow	26	
26	(Lithuania) Paulius Jankūnas	(Lithuania) Žalgiris	30	
27	(Spain) Sergio Llull (2)	(Spain) Real Madrid	32	
28	(United States) Anthony Randolph	(Spain) Real Madrid	30	
29	(United States) Brad Wanamaker	(Turkey) Darüşşafaka Doğuş	34	
30	(United States) Latavious Williams	(Russia) UNICS	34	

==== Playoffs ====
Game	Player	Team	PIR	Ref.
1	(Serbia) Bogdan Bogdanović	(Turkey) Fenerbahçe	35	
2	(Serbia) Bogdan Bogdanović (2)	(Turkey) Fenerbahçe	35	
3	(Mexico) Gustavo Ayón	(Spain) Real Madrid	23	
3	(Slovenia) Luka Dončić (3)	(Spain) Real Madrid	23	
3	(Armenia) Bryant Dunston	(Turkey) Anadolu Efes	23	
4	(Slovenia) Luka Dončić (4)	(Spain) Real Madrid	21	
5	(Greece) Vassilis Spanoulis (2)	(Greece) Olympiacos	22	

=== MVP of the Month ===
Month	Player	Team	Ref.
2016
October	(Serbia) Miloš Teodosić	(Russia) CSKA Moscow	
November	(Spain) Sergio Llull	(Spain) Real Madrid	
December	(Italy) Nicolò Melli	(Germany) Brose Bamberg	
2017
January	(Serbia) Ognjen Kuzmić	(Serbia) Crvena zvezda mts	
February	(France) Thomas Heurtel	(Turkey) Anadolu Efes	
March	(United States) Chris Singleton	(Greece) Panathinaikos Superfoods	
April	(Serbia) Bogdan Bogdanović	(Turkey) Fenerbahçe	

== Individual statistics ==
=== Rating ===
Rank	Name	Team	Games	Rating	PIR
1.	(United States) Keith Langford	(Russia) UNICS	28	611	21.82
2.	(France) Nando de Colo	(Russia) CSKA Moscow	28	583	20.82
3.	(United States) Ekpe Udoh	(Turkey) Fenerbahçe	31	641	20.68

=== Points ===
Rank	Name	Team	Games	Points	PPG
1.	(United States) Keith Langford	(Russia) UNICS	28	609	21.75
2.	(France) Nando de Colo	(Russia) CSKA Moscow	28	534	19.07
3.	(United States) Andrew Goudelock	(Israel) Maccabi FOX Tel Aviv	20	345	17.25

=== Rebounds ===
Rank	Name	Team	Games	Rebounds	RPG
1.	(United States) Ekpe Udoh	(Turkey) Fenerbahçe	31	241	7.77
2.	(Italy) Nicolò Melli	(Germany) Brose Bamberg	30	222	7.40
3.	(United States) Tyler Honeycutt	(Turkey) Anadolu Efes	35	256	7.31

=== Assists ===
Rank	Name	Team	Games	Assists	APG
1.	(Serbia) Miloš Teodosić	(Russia) CSKA Moscow	29	197	6.79
2.	(Greece) Vassilis Spanoulis	(Greece) Olympiacos	33	201	6.09
3.	(Spain) Sergio Llull	(Spain) Real Madrid	33	194	5.88

=== Other statistics ===
Category	Player	Team	Games	Average
Steals	(United States) Charles Jenkins	(Serbia) Crvena zvezda mts	30	2.07
Blocks	(United States) Ekpe Udoh	(Turkey) Fenerbahçe	31	2.19
Turnovers	(Greece) Vassilis Spanoulis	(Greece) Olympiacos	33	3.97
Fouls drawn	(United States) Keith Langford	(Russia) UNICS	28	7.96
Minutes	(United States) Keith Langford	(Russia) UNICS	28	34:01
2P%	(Mexico) Gustavo Ayón	(Spain) Real Madrid	36	69.9%
3P%	(United States) Jon Diebler	(Turkey) Galatasaray Odeabank	29	53.9%
FT%	(France) Nando de Colo	(Russia) CSKA Moscow	28	95.9%

Source: EuroLeague

=== Individual game highs ===
Category	Player	Team	Statistic
PIR	(Serbia) Miloš Teodosić	(Russia) CSKA Moscow	43
Points	(United States) Keith Langford	(Russia) UNICS	36
Rebounds	(Croatia) Ante Žižić	(Turkey) Darüşşafaka Doğuş	18
Assists	(France) Thomas Heurtel	(Turkey) Anadolu Efes	15
Assists	(Greece) Vassilis Spanoulis	(Greece) Olympiacos	15
Steals	(Serbia) Bogdan Bogdanović	(Turkey) Fenerbahçe	7
Blocks	(Armenia) Bryant Dunston	(Turkey) Anadolu Efes	5
Blocks	(United States) Ekpe Udoh	(Turkey) Fenerbahçe	5
Three pointers	(United States) Scottie Wilbekin	(Turkey) Darüşşafaka Doğuş	8
Turnovers	(Serbia) Miloš Teodosić	(Russia) CSKA Moscow	9

Source: EuroLeague

== Attendances ==
Attendances include playoff games:

Pos	Team	Total	High	Low	Average	Change
	2017 Final Four games	59,276	15,671	13,967	14,819	+30.6%
1	Baskonia	186,133	14,875	9,437	11,633	+6.3%
2	Žalgiris	171,266	15,231	8,621	11,418	+3.8%
3	Fenerbahçe	179,510	12,973	7,891	11,219	+10.4%
4	Panathinaikos Superfoods	189,931	17,829	6,139	11,172	+9.9%
5	Maccabi FOX Tel Aviv	163,320	11,060	8,480	10,888	−1.6%
6	Real Madrid	175,310	11,998	8,210	10,312	−4.3%
7	Crvena zvezda mts	147,265	18,487	5,783	9,818	−5.9%
8	EA7 Emporio Armani Milan	142,242	12,788	6,416	9,483	+12.5%
9	Olympiacos	168,483	11,039	7,167	9,360	+9.3%
10	CSKA Moscow	140,977	12,017	6,173	8,293	+13.4%
11	Brose Bamberg	96,226	8,000	6,030	6,415	−5.1%
12	Anadolu Efes	90,443	11,121	2,424	5,320	+14.9%
13	FC Barcelona Lassa	73,971	7,013	3,037	4,931	−18.9%
14	Galatasaray Odeabank	72,093	10,433	2,019	4,806	−4.7%^{1}
15	Darüşşafaka Doğuş	79,502	4,982	3,817	4,677	+5.5%
16	UNICS	56,003	5,801	1,746	3,734	+31.8%^{1}
	League total	2,194,238	18,487	1,746	8,472	+5.4%

Updated to match(es) played on 21 May 2017. Source: EuroLeague
Notes:
1: 2015–16 season average applied to EuroCup games.

== See also ==
- 2016–17 EuroCup Basketball
- 2016–17 Basketball Champions League
- 2016–17 FIBA Europe Cup
