= 2017 EuroLeague Playoffs =

Basketball tournament

The 2016–17 EuroLeague Playoffs were played from 18 April to 2 May 2017. A total of 8 teams competed in the Playoffs.

== Format ==
In the playoffs, a best-of-five games format is used. The team that wins the series will be the first team to win three games. The first two games will be played on the playing court of the four highest-place teams, the third game and, if necessary, the fourth, will be played on the playing court of the next four highest-place teams and the fifth game, if necessary, will be played on the playing court of the four highest-place teams.

Game 1 was played on 18 and 19 April, game 2 was played on 20 and 21 April, game 3 was played on 25 and 26 April, game 4, if necessary, was played on 28 April, and game 5, if necessary, was played on 2 May 2017.

== Qualified teams ==
Pos	Team	Pld	W	L	PF	PA	PD	Seeding
1	(Spain) Real Madrid	30	23	7	2585	2353	+232	Seeded in quarterfinals
2	(Russia) CSKA Moscow	30	22	8	2608	2355	+253	Seeded in quarterfinals
3	(Greece) Olympiacos	30	19	11	2330	2221	+109	Seeded in quarterfinals
4	(Greece) Panathinaikos	30	19	11	2263	2187	+76	Seeded in quarterfinals
5	(Turkey) Fenerbahçe	30	18	12	2256	2233	+23	Unseeded in quarterfinals
6	(Turkey) Anadolu Efes	30	17	13	2472	2467	+5	Unseeded in quarterfinals
7	(Spain) Baskonia	30	17	13	2445	2376	+69	Unseeded in quarterfinals
8	(Turkey) Darüşşafaka Doğuş	30	16	14	2358	2353	+5	Unseeded in quarterfinals

Source: EuroLeague

== Series ==
Team 1	Series	Team 2	Game 1	Game 2	Game 3	Game 4	Game 5
Real Madrid (Spain)	3–1	(Turkey) Darüşşafaka Doğuş	83–75	80–84	88–81	89–78	
Panathinaikos Superfoods (Greece)	0–3	(Turkey) Fenerbahçe	58–71	75–80	61–79		
Olympiacos (Greece)	3–2	(Turkey) Anadolu Efes	87–72	71–73	60–64	74–62	87–78
CSKA Moscow (Russia)	3–0	(Spain) Baskonia	98–90	84–82	90–88		

== Games ==
=== Game 1 ===
18 April 2017	CSKA Moscow (Russia)	98–90 (Series: 1–0)	(Spain) Baskonia	Moscow
19:00 (CEST)	Scoring by quarter: 26–19, 18–21, 28–22, 26–28
	Pts: Teodosić 22; Rebs: three players 5 Asts: Jackson, Teodosić 5 PIR: Teodosić 22	Boxscore	Pts: Larkin 17; Rebs: Voigtmann 8 Asts: Hanga, Luz 4 PIR: Voigtmann 21	Arena: Megasport Arena; Attendance: 6,986; Referees: Damir Javor (SLO), Robert Lottermoser (GER), Piotr Pastusiak (POL)

18 April 2017	Panathinaikos Superfoods (Greece)	58–71 (Series: 0–1)	(Turkey) Fenerbahçe	Athens
20:00 (CEST)	Scoring by quarter: 15–16, 27–12, 8–20, 8–23
	Pts: Rivers 16; Rebs: Bourousis 6 Asts: Calathes 5 PIR: James 13	Boxscore	Pts: Bogdanović 23; Rebs: Sloukas 6 Asts: Sloukas 5 PIR: Bogdanović 35	Arena: Olympic Indoor Hall; Attendance: 17,829; Referees: Daniel Hierrezuelo (ESP), Ilija Belošević (SRB), Carmelo Paternicò (ITA)

19 April 2017	Olympiacos (Greece)	87–72 (Series: 1–0)	(Turkey) Anadolu Efes	Piraeus
20:00 (CEST)	Scoring by quarter: 18–11, 24–20, 25–19, 20–22
	Pts: Mantzaris 14; Rebs: Printezis 11; Asts: Spanoulis 7 PIR: Milutinov 20	Boxscore	Pts: Honeycutt 17; Rebs: Honeycutt 10; Asts: Heurtel 4 PIR: Honeycutt 22	Arena: Peace and Friendship Stadium; Attendance: 11,039; Referees: Fernando Rocha (POR), Juan Carlos García González (ESP), Oļegs Latiševs (LAT)

19 April 2017	Real Madrid (Spain)	83–75 (Series: 1–0)	(Turkey) Darüşşafaka Doğuş	Madrid
21:00 (CEST)	Scoring by quarter: 16–24, 20–13, 25–16, 22–22
	Pts: Llull 23; Rebs: Randolph 7 Asts: Llull 6 PIR: Llull 23	Boxscore	Pts: Wanamaker 21; Rebs: Žižić 6 Asts: Bertāns 3 PIR: Wanamaker 17	Arena: WiZink Center; Attendance: 9,614; Referees: Luigi Lamonica (ITA), Boris Ryzhyk (UKR), Matej Boltauzer (SLO)

=== Game 2 ===
20 April 2017	CSKA Moscow (Russia)	84–82 (Series: 2–0)	(Spain) Baskonia	Moscow
19:00 (CEST)	Scoring by quarter: 21–20, 19–15, 29–23, 15–24
	Pts: Teodosić 16; Rebs: Khryapa 6 Asts: Teodosić 8 PIR: Hines 18	Boxscore	Pts: Beaubois 21; Rebs: Tillie 9 Asts: Larkin 8 PIR: Budinger 19	Arena: Megasport Arena; Attendance: 8,504; Referees: Sreten Radović (CRO), Milivoje Jovčić (SRB), Mario Majkić (SLO)

20 April 2017	Panathinaikos Superfoods (Greece)	75–80 (Series: 0–2)	(Turkey) Fenerbahçe	Athens
20:00 (CEST)	Scoring by quarter: 20–22, 23–23, 16–18, 16–17
	Pts: James 22; Rebs: Bourousis 6 Asts: Calathes 5 PIR: James 22	Boxscore	Pts: Bogdanović 25; Rebs: Udoh 9 Asts: Sloukas 7 PIR: Bogdanović 35	Arena: Olympic Indoor Hall; Attendance: 17,419; Referees: Saša Pukl (SLO), Oļegs Latiševs (LAT), Benjamín Jiménez (ESP)

21 April 2017	Olympiacos (Greece)	71–73 (Series: 1–1)	(Turkey) Anadolu Efes	Piraeus
20:00 (CEST)	Scoring by quarter: 22–23, 22–14, 10–14, 17–22
	Pts: Printezis, Spanoulis 20; Rebs: Papanikolaou, Printezis 6 Asts: Spanoulis 6 PIR: Printezis 23	Boxscore	Pts: Dunston 16; Rebs: Honeycutt 9 Asts: Granger 9 PIR: Dunston 27	Arena: Peace and Friendship Stadium; Attendance: 11,039; Referees: Luigi Lamonica (ITA), Miguel Pérez Pérez (ESP), Amit Balak (ISR)

21 April 2017	Real Madrid (Spain)	80–84 (Series: 1–1)	(Turkey) Darüşşafaka Doğuş	Madrid
21:00 (CEST)	Scoring by quarter: 19–22, 19–22, 30–22, 12–18
	Pts: Llull 22; Rebs: Ayón 8 Asts: Dončić, Llull 6 PIR: Ayón 30	Boxscore	Pts: Wanamaker 21; Rebs: Anderson, Žižić 8 Asts: Wanamaker, Wilbekin 4 PIR: Žižić 20	Arena: WiZink Center; Attendance: 11,293; Referees: Chrıstos Chrıstodoulou (GRE), Ilija Belošević (SRB), Piotr Pastusiak (POL)

=== Game 3 ===
25 April 2017	Fenerbahçe (Turkey)	79–61 (Series: 3–0)	(Greece) Panathinaikos Superfoods	Istanbul
19:45 (CEST)	Scoring by quarter: 18–17, 19–13, 15–12, 27–19
	Pts: Dixon 13; Rebs: Udoh 10; Asts: Sloukas 4 PIR: Udoh 18	Boxscore	Pts: Rivers 16; Rebs: Gist, Singleton 5 Asts: James 4 PIR: Rivers 14	Arena: Ülker Sports Arena; Attendance: 12,973; Referees: Luigi Lamonica (ITA), Fernando Rocha (POR), Borys Ryzhyk (UKR)

25 April 2017	Baskonia (Spain)	88–90 (Series: 0–3)	(Russia) CSKA Moscow	Vitoria-Gasteiz
21:00 (CEST)	Scoring by quarter: 24–22, 20–21, 26–29, 18–18
	Pts: Shengelia 19; Rebs: Budinger 8 Asts: Larkin 5 PIR: Shengelia 23	Boxscore	Pts: Higgins 21; Rebs: Hines, Vorontsevich 7 Asts: de Colo 5 PIR: Higgins 20	Arena: Fernando Buesa Arena; Attendance: 11,862; Referees: Ilija Belošević (SRB), Carmelo Paternicò (ITA), Matej Boltauzer (SLO)

26 April 2017	Anadolu Efes (Turkey)	64–60 (Series: 2–1)	(Greece) Olympiacos	Istanbul
18:30 (CEST)	Scoring by quarter: 14–17, 19–10, 18–10, 13–23
	Pts: Dunston 16; Rebs: Dunston 9 Asts: Heurtel 6 PIR: Dunston 23	Boxscore	Pts: Spanoulis 15; Rebs: three players 7 Asts: Spanoulis 7 PIR: Spanoulis 15	Arena: Abdi İpekçi Arena; Attendance: 10,345; Referees: Daniel Hierrezuelo (ESP), Damir Javor (SLO), Robert Lottermoser (GER)

26 April 2017	Darüşşafaka Doğuş (Turkey)	81–88 (Series: 1–2)	(Spain) Real Madrid	Istanbul
20:15 (CEST)	Scoring by quarter: 17–26, 16–20, 25–24, 23–18
	Pts: Žižić 20; Rebs: Anderson 7 Asts: Wanamaker 9 PIR: Žižić 28	Boxscore	Pts: Carroll 21; Rebs: Ayón 9 Asts: Llull 6 PIR: Ayón, Dončić 23	Arena: Volkswagen Arena; Attendance: 4,943; Referees: Saša Pukl (SLO), Milivoje Jovčić (SRB), Oļegs Latiševs (LAT)

=== Game 4 ===
28 April 2017	Darüşşafaka Doğuş (Turkey)	78–89 (Series: 1–3)	(Spain) Real Madrid	Istanbul
18:30 (CEST)	Scoring by quarter: 21–24, 17–21, 20–27, 20–17
	Pts: Wanamaker 25; Rebs: Moerman, Žižić 6 Asts: Wilbekin 3 PIR: Wanamaker 20	Boxscore	Pts: Llull 17; Rebs: Ayón 8 Asts: Dončić 7 PIR: Dončić 21	Arena: Volkswagen Arena; Attendance: 4,954; Referees: Damir Javor (SLO), Sreten Radović (CRO), Fernando Rocha (POR)

28 April 2017	Anadolu Efes (Turkey)	62–74 (Series: 2–2)	(Greece) Olympiacos	Istanbul
20:15 (CEST)	Scoring by quarter: 21–14, 17–21, 16–20, 8–19
	Pts: Granger 17; Rebs: Dunston 11; Asts: Heurtel 5 PIR: Granger 17	Boxscore	Pts: Spanoulis 18; Rebs: Young 7 Asts: Mantzaris 5 PIR: Spanoulis 17	Arena: Abdi İpekçi Arena; Attendance: 11,121; Referees: Boris Ryzhyk (UKR), Juan Carlos García González (ESP), Matej Boltauzer (SLO)

=== Game 5 ===
2 May 2017	Olympiacos (Greece)	87–78 (Series: 3–2)	(Turkey) Anadolu Efes	Piraeus
20:00 (CEST)	Scoring by quarter: 25–21, 12–20, 26–17, 24–20
	Pts: Spanoulis 22; Rebs: Birch 11; Asts: Spanoulis 6 PIR: Spanoulis 22	Boxscore	Pts: Osman 11; Rebs: Honeycutt 10; Asts: Heurtel 6 PIR: Honeycutt 15	Arena: Peace and Friendship Stadium; Attendance: 11,039; Referees: Daniel Hierrezuelo (ESP), Milivoje Jovčić (SRB), Oļegs Latiševs (LAT)
