= Derrick Brown (basketball, born 1987) =

American basketball player

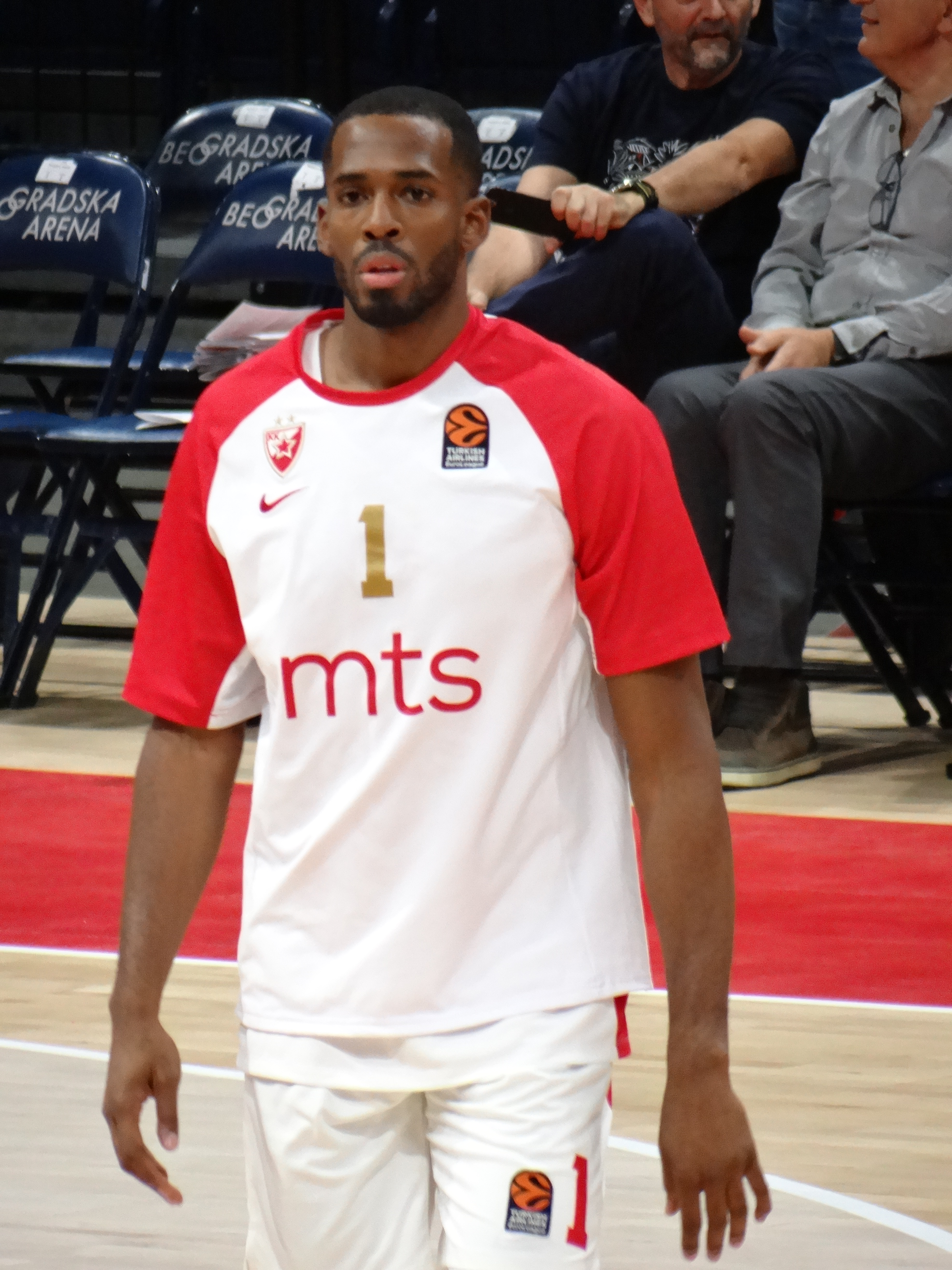
- Brown with Crvena zvezda in 2019.

Personal information
- Born: September 8, 1987 (age 39) Oakland, California, U.S.
- Listed height: 6 ft 8 in (2.03 m)
- Listed weight: 216 lb (98 kg)

Career information
- High school: Chaminade-Julienne (Dayton, Ohio)
- College: Xavier (2005–2009)
- NBA draft: 2009: 2nd round, 40th overall pick
- Drafted by: Charlotte Bobcats
- Playing career: 2009–2020
- Position: Power forward
- Number: 4, 2, 1

Career history
- 2009–2011: Charlotte Bobcats
- 2011: New York Knicks
- 2011–2012: Charlotte Bobcats
- 2012–2015: Lokomotiv Kuban
- 2015–2018: Anadolu Efes
- 2019–2020: Crvena zvezda

Career highlights
- Turkish Cup (2018); All-EuroCup First Team (2015); All-EuroCup Second Team (2013); 2× All-VTB United League First Team (2014, 2015); Second-team All-Atlantic 10 (2009)
- Stats at NBA.com
- Stats at Basketball Reference

Derrick Paul Brown (born September 8, 1987) is an American former professional basketball player. Standing at 6 ft 8 in (2.03 m), he played at the power forward position.

== High school career ==
Considered a three-star recruit by Rivals.com, Brown was listed as the No. 26 small forward and the No. 115 player in the nation in 2005.

== College career ==
Brown played college basketball for the Xavier Musketeers from 2005 to 2009.

== Professional career ==
=== Charlotte Bobcats (2009–2012) ===
Brown entered the 2009 NBA draft, and was selected 40th overall by the Charlotte Bobcats.

On July 13, 2009, he was signed to a two-year contract by the Charlotte Bobcats. On February 24, 2011, Derrick Brown was waived by the Bobcats after a trade with the Thunder that sent Nazr Mohammed to the Thunder. The New York Knicks announced on March 1, 2011, that they had claimed Brown off waivers.

On December 9, 2011, he returned to the Bobcats with a one-year minimum deal. Over 65 games in 2011–12 NBA season, which was shortened to 66 games due to 2011 NBA lockout, Brown averaged career-high 8.1 points, 3.6 rebounds and 1 assist per game.

On June 29, 2012, the Bobcats extended a qualifying to Brown, making him a restricted free agent. However, on July 18, 2012, the Bobcats withdrew the offer, making him an unrestricted free agent. On September 27, 2012, Brown signed with the San Antonio Spurs. However, he did not make the team's final roster.

=== Lokomotiv Kuban (2012–2015) ===
On October 31, 2012, Brown signed a three-year contract with the Russian team Lokomotiv Kuban Krasnodar. He was named to the All-EuroCup Second Team in 2013. In 2013–14 season, he debuted in European top-tier EuroLeague. Over 23 EuroLeague games with Lokomotiv Kuban, he averaged 13.9 points, 4.5 rebounds, 1.7 assists and 1.4 steals per game.

=== Anadolu Efes (2015–2018) ===
On June 23, 2015, Brown signed a two-year contract with the Turkish club Anadolu Efes. On June 21, 2017, he signed a two-year contract extension with Efes. In 2017–18 season, his third with the team, Brown's role and productivity decreased significantly. Over 19 EuroLeague games, he averaged 7.2 points and 2.3 rebounds per game. After the season, he parted ways with the club and was inactive for the whole 2018–19 season.

=== Crvena zvezda (2019–2020) ===
On June 27, 2019, he signed a one-year deal with the Serbian club Crvena zvezda. He was waived on February 3, 2020.

== Career statistics ==
Legend
GP	Games played	GS	Games started	MPG	Minutes per game
FG%	Field-goal percentage	3P%	3-point field-goal percentage	FT%	Free-throw percentage
RPG	Rebounds per game	APG	Assists per game	SPG	Steals per game
BPG	Blocks per game	PPG	Points per game	PIR	Performance index rating
**Bold**	Career high

=== NBA ===
==== Regular season ====
Year	Team	GP	GS	MPG	FG%	3P%	FT%	RPG	APG	SPG	BPG	PPG
2009–10	Charlotte	57	0	9.4	.463	.286	**.667**	1.4	.3	.4	.2	3.3
2010–11	Charlotte	41	1	11.9	.549	.333	.532	2.0	.7	.4	.2	3.7
2010–11	New York	8	0	11.0	**.667**	**.750**	.538	1.9	.5	.5	**.3**	4.3
2011–12	Charlotte	**65**	**17**	**22.2**	.518	.250	**.667**	**3.6**	**1.0**	**.7**	.2	**8.1**
Career		171	18	14.9	.515	.317	.637	2.4	.7	.5	.2	5.2

==== Playoffs ====
Year	Team	GP	GS	MPG	FG%	3P%	FT%	RPG	APG	SPG	BPG	PPG
2010	Charlotte	2	0	.5	1.000	.000	.000	.0	.0	.0	.0	1.0
Career		2	0	.5	1.000	.000	.000	.0	.0	.0	.0	1.0

=== EuroLeague ===
Year	Team	GP	GS	MPG	FG%	3P%	FT%	RPG	APG	SPG	BPG	PPG	PIR
2013–14	Lokomotiv Kuban	23	23	28.8	**.568**	.333	.714	4.5	1.7	**1.4**	.4	**13.9**	**16.2**
2015–16	Anadolu Efes	24	6	23.2	.451	.256	.631	5.3	1.4	.5	**.5**	9.8	11.6
2016–17	Anadolu Efes	**35**	**35**	**29.3**	.491	.293	.767	**5.5**	**2.2**	1.0	**.5**	12.3	15.3
2017–18	Anadolu Efes	19	6	20.5	.400	**.379**	**.850**	2.3	1.6	.6	.2	7.2	5.6
Career		101	70	26.1	.488	.304	.725	4.6	1.8	.9	.4	11.1	12.8
