= 2017–18 EuroCup Basketball Playoffs =

The 2017–18 EuroCup Basketball Playoffs began on 6 March and end on 13 or 16 April 2018 with the second or third leg, if necessary, of the 2018 EuroCup Finals, to decide the champions of the 2017–18 EuroCup Basketball. Eight teams compete in the playoffs.

Times up to 24 March 2018 are CET (UTC+1), thereafter (third leg semifinals and finals) times are CEST (UTC+2).

== Format ==
The playoffs involves the eight teams which qualified as winners and runners-up of each of the four groups in the 2017–18 EuroCup Basketball Top 16.

Each tie in the playoffs, apart from the final, is played with a best-of-three-games format. The team that performed better in the Top 16 will play the games first and third, if necessary, at home.

== Qualified teams ==
Group	Winners (Seeded in quarterfinals)	Runners-up (Unseeded in quarterfinals)
E	(Turkey) Darüşşafaka	(Spain) Herbalife Gran Canaria
F	(Germany) Bayern Munich	(Russia) Zenit Saint Petersburg
G	(Russia) Lokomotiv Kuban	(Montenegro) Budućnost VOLI
H	(Italy) Grissin Bon Reggio Emilia	(Russia) UNICS

=== Standings ===
Pos	Grp	Team	Pld	W	L	PF	PA	PD	Seeding
1	G	(Russia) Lokomotiv Kuban	6	6	0	470	392	+78	Seeded in quarterfinals
2	E	(Turkey) Darüşşafaka	6	5	1	480	412	+68	Seeded in quarterfinals
3	F	(Germany) Bayern Munich	6	5	1	526	480	+46	Seeded in quarterfinals
4	H	(Italy) Grissin Bon Reggio Emilia	6	4	2	444	414	+30	Seeded in quarterfinals
5	G	(Montenegro) Budućnost VOLI	6	4	2	451	420	+31	Unseeded in quarterfinals
6	E	(Spain) Herbalife Gran Canaria	6	4	2	507	484	+23	Unseeded in quarterfinals
7	F	(Russia) Zenit Saint Petersburg	6	4	2	549	528	+21	Unseeded in quarterfinals
8	H	(Russia) UNICS	6	4	2	447	437	+10	Unseeded in quarterfinals

Source: EuroCup Basketball

== Bracket ==
Quarterfinals
(Russia) Lokomotiv Kuban	79	80
(Spain) Herbalife Gran Canaria	74	58
(Italy) Grissin Bon Reggio Emilia	75	77	105
(Russia) Zenit Saint Petersburg	61	91	99
(Turkey) Darüşşafaka	57	78
(Montenegro) Budućnost VOLI	54	71
(Germany) Bayern Munich	83	73	91
(Russia) UNICS	75	80	81

Semifinals
(Russia) Lokomotiv Kuban	82	79
(Italy) Grissin Bon Reggio Emilia	65	69
(Turkey) Darüşşafaka	76	87
(Germany) Bayern Munich	74	83

Finals
(Russia) Lokomotiv Kuban	78	59
(Turkey) Darüşşafaka	81	67

== Quarterfinals ==
The first legs were played on 6 March, the second legs were played on 9 March and the third legs, if necessary, were played on 14 March 2018.

Team 1	Series	Team 2	Game 1	Game 2	Game 3
Darüşşafaka (Turkey)	2–0	(Montenegro) Budućnost VOLI	57–54	78–71	
Bayern Munich (Germany)	2–1	(Russia) UNICS	83–75	73–80	91–81
Lokomotiv Kuban (Russia)	2–0	(Spain) Herbalife Gran Canaria	79–74	80–58	
Grissin Bon Reggio Emilia (Italy)	2–1	(Russia) Zenit Saint Petersburg	75–61	77–91	105–99

=== First leg ===
6 March 2018	Lokomotiv Kuban (Russia)	79–74 (Series: 1–0)	(Spain) Herbalife Gran Canaria	Krasnodar
18:00	Scoring by quarter: 24–27, 15–20, 20–15, 20–12
	Pts: Kulagin 20; Rebs: Elegar, Qvale 6 Asts: Khvostov 4 PIR: Kulagin 24	Boxscore	Pts: Rabaseda, Radičević 11; Rebs: Aguilar, Balvín 6 Asts: Mekel 4 PIR: Balvín 15	Arena: Basket Hall; Attendance: 5,013; Referees: Elias Koromilas (GRE), Sašo Petek (SLO), Saulius Racys (SWE)

6 March 2018	Darüşşafaka (Turkey)	57–54 (Series: 1–0)	(Montenegro) Budućnost VOLI	Istanbul
18:15	Scoring by quarter: 16–13, 11–13, 19–9, 11–19
	Pts: Johnson 17; Rebs: Johnson 9 Asts: Wilbekin 7 PIR: Wilbekin 28	Boxscore	Pts: Ivanović, D. Nikolić 12; Rebs: D. Nikolić 10; Asts: Ivanović 4 PIR: D. Nikolić 22	Arena: Volkswagen Arena; Attendance: 3,665; Referees: Carlos Peruga (ESP), Piotr Pastusiak (POL), David Romano (ISR)

6 March 2018	Bayern Munich (Germany)	83–75 (Series: 1–0)	(Russia) UNICS	Munich
20:30	Scoring by quarter: 19–15, 14–17, 22–20, 28–23
	Pts: Booker 16; Rebs: Booker 9 Asts: Jović 8 PIR: Booker 27	Boxscore	Pts: Colom 22; Rebs: Lasme 6 Asts: Ponkrashov 4 PIR: Colom 19	Arena: Audi Dome; Attendance: 6,239; Referees: Miguel Pérez Pérez (ESP), Petros Papapetrou (GRE), Nick van den Broeck (BEL)

6 March 2018	Grissin Bon Reggio Emilia (Italy)	75–61 (Series: 1–0)	(Russia) Zenit Saint Petersburg	Reggio Emilia
20:30	Scoring by quarter: 13–17, 22–12, 19–17, 21–15
	Pts: Reynolds 19; Rebs: Reynolds 11; Asts: C. Wright 6 PIR: Reynolds 29	Boxscore	Pts: Karasev 19; Rebs: Gordon 6 Asts: Karasev 4 PIR: Karasev 23	Arena: PalaBigi; Attendance: 4,280; Referees: Robert Vyklický (CZE), Uroš Obrknežević (SRB), Josip Radojković (CRO)

=== Second leg ===
9 March 2018	Zenit Saint Petersburg (Russia)	91–77 (Series: 1–1)	(Italy) Grissin Bon Reggio Emilia	Saint Petersburg
16:00	Scoring by quarter: 20–18, 15–21, 29–21, 27–17
	Pts: Voronov 22; Rebs: Voronov 8 Asts: Griffin 7 PIR: Voronov 32	Boxscore	Pts: Markoishvili, J. Wright 13; Rebs: J. Wright 8 Asts: Markoishvili 5 PIR: Reynolds 20	Arena: Yubileyny Sports Palace; Attendance: 4,859; Referees: Seffi Shemmesh (ISR), Sašo Petek (SLO), Igor Dragojević (MNE)

9 March 2018	UNICS (Russia)	80–73 (Series: 1–1)	(Germany) Bayern Munich	Kazan
18:00	Scoring by quarter: 16–22, 14–18, 24–12, 26–21
	Pts: Colom 15; Rebs: Lasme 7 Asts: Colom, Lockett 3 PIR: Colom, Lasme 19	Boxscore	Pts: Booker 29; Rebs: Redding 8 Asts: Cunningham, Jović 4 PIR: Booker 37	Arena: Basket Hall; Attendance: 5,644; Referees: Daniel Hierrezuelo (ESP), Amit Balak (ISR), Jurgis Laurinavičius (LTU)

9 March 2018	Budućnost VOLI (Montenegro)	71–78 (Series: 0–2)	(Turkey) Darüşşafaka	Podgorica
19:00	Scoring by quarter: 12–19, 14–20, 20–20, 25–19
	Pts: Gibson 19; Rebs: Z. Nikolić 8 Asts: Gordić, Ivanović 3 PIR: Ivanović 17	Boxscore	Pts: Wilbekin 22; Rebs: Özmızrak 6 Asts: Ulubay, Wilbekin 4 PIR: Wilbekin 29	Arena: Morača; Attendance: 2,469; Referees: Juan Carlos García González (ESP), Aare Halliko (EST), Tomás Trawicki (POL)

9 March 2018	Herbalife Gran Canaria (Spain)	59–80 (Series: 0–2)	(Russia) Lokomotiv Kuban	Las Palmas
21:00	Scoring by quarter: 15–15, 20–22, 9–19, 15–24
	Pts: Balvín 12; Rebs: Balvín 6 Asts: Mekel 5 PIR: Balvín 15	Boxscore	Pts: Kulagin 32; Rebs: Elegar 8 Asts: Collins 6 PIR: Kulagin 34	Arena: Gran Canaria Arena; Attendance: 5,567; Referees: Piotr Pastusiak (POL), Anne Panther (GER), Mehdi Difallah (FRA)

=== Third leg ===
14 March 2018	Bayern Munich (Germany)	91–81 (Series: 2–1)	(Russia) UNICS	Munich
20:30	Scoring by quarter: 27–27, 19–15, 23–21, 22–18
	Pts: Redding 23; Rebs: Redding 7 Asts: Jović 7 PIR: Redding 32	Boxscore	Pts: Lockett 16; Rebs: Ejim 7 Asts: Colom 7 PIR: Lockett 21	Arena: Audi Dome; Attendance: 5,845; Referees: Borys Ryzhyk (UKR), Michele Rossi (ITA), Arturas Sukys (LTU)

14 March 2018	Grissin Bon Reggio Emilia (Italy)	105–99 (Series: 2–1)	(Russia) Zenit Saint Petersburg	Reggio Emilia
20:30	Scoring by quarter: 20–22, 25–18, 25–31, 35–28
	Pts: C. Wright 25; Rebs: Reynolds, C. Wright 6 Asts: C. Wright 5 PIR: C. Wright 34	Boxscore	Pts: Voronov 23; Rebs: Kuric 7 Asts: Kuric 2 PIR: Voronov 19	Arena: PalaBigi; Attendance: 4,295; Referees: Fernando Rocha (POR), Jakub Zamojski (POL), Milan Nedović (SLO)

== Semifinals ==
The first legs were played on 20 March, the second legs were played on 23 March, and the third legs were scheduled for 28 March 2018.

Team 1	Series	Team 2	Game 1	Game 2	Game 3
Darüşşafaka (Turkey)	2–0	(Germany) Bayern Munich	76–74	87–83	
Lokomotiv Kuban (Russia)	2–0	(Italy) Grissin Bon Reggio Emilia	82–65	79–69	

=== First leg ===
20 March 2018	Lokomotiv Kuban (Russia)	82–65 (Series: 1–0)	(Italy) Grissin Bon Reggio Emilia	Krasnodar
17:30	Scoring by quarter: 19–15, 24–13, 20–23, 19–14
	Pts: Qvale 16; Rebs: Elegar 9 Asts: Collins 6 PIR: Elegar 20	Boxscore	Pts: C. Wright 14; Rebs: Reynolds 9 Asts: Markoishvili 6 PIR: Reynolds 20	Arena: Basket Hall; Attendance: 6,367; Referees: Ioannis Foufis (GRE), Seffi Shemmesh (ISR), Marko Juras (SRB)

20 March 2018	Darüşşafaka (Turkey)	76–74 (Series: 1–0)	(Germany) Bayern Munich	Istanbul
18:45	Scoring by quarter: 11–25, 19–22, 28–16, 18–11
	Pts: Wilbekin 24; Rebs: Eric 11; Asts: Wilbekin 7 PIR: Eric 30	Boxscore	Pts: Cunningham 20; Rebs: Redding 7 Asts: Cunningham 5 PIR: Cunningham 20	Arena: Volkswagen Arena; Attendance: 4,750; Referees: Carlos Cortés (ESP), Joseph Bissang (FRA), Petros Papapetrou (GRE)

=== Second leg ===
23 March 2018	Bayern Munich (Germany)	83–87 (Series: 0–2)	(Turkey) Darüşşafaka	Munich
20:00	Scoring by quarter: 22–17, 22–24, 20–25, 19–21
	Pts: Redding 14; Rebs: three players 6 Asts: Jović 6 PIR: Booker 20	Boxscore	Pts: Wilbekin 41; Rebs: Eric 7 Asts: Wilbekin 5 PIR: Wilbekin 44	Arena: Audi Dome; Attendance: 6,043; Referees: Daniel Hierrezuelo (ESP), Sérgio Silva (POR), Josip Radojković (CRO)

23 March 2018	Grissin Bon Reggio Emilia (Italy)	69–79 (Series: 0–2)	(Russia) Lokomotiv Kuban	Reggio Emilia
20:45	Scoring by quarter: 15–17, 11–22, 16–19, 27–21
	Pts: White 14; Rebs: Reynolds 7 Asts: C. Wright 5 PIR: White 16	Boxscore	Pts: Collins 22; Rebs: Elegar 9 Asts: Collins, Ragland 3 PIR: Collins 31	Arena: PalaBigi; Attendance: 4,465; Referees: Carlos Cortés (ESP), Tomislav Hordov (CRO), Marcin Kowalski (POL)

== Finals ==
The first leg will be played on 10 April, the second leg will be played on 13 April, and the third leg was scheduled to 16 April 2018, if necessary.

Team 1	Series	Team 2	Game 1	Game 2	Game 3
Lokomotiv Kuban (Russia)	0–2	(Turkey) Darüşşafaka	78–81	59–67	

=== First leg ===
10 April 2018	Lokomotiv Kuban (Russia)	78–81(OT) (Series: 0–1)	(Turkey) Darüşşafaka	Krasnodar
19:00	Scoring by quarter: 14–15, 21–16, 17–18, 20–23, Overtime: 6–9
	Pts: Kulagin 18; Rebs: Lacey 7 Asts: Kulagin 7 PIR: Kulagin 24	Boxscore	Pts: Wilbekin 24; Rebs: Cummings 8 Asts: Sant-Roos, Wilbekin 5 PIR: Cummings 25	Arena: Basket-Hall; Attendance: 7,124; Referees: Damir Javor (SLO), Emilio Pérez Pizarro (ESP), Rain Peerandi (EST)

=== Second leg ===
13 April 2018	Darüşşafaka (Turkey)	67–59 (Series: 2–0)	(Russia) Lokomotiv Kuban	Istanbul
19:15	Scoring by quarter: 21–17, 18–16, 16–12, 12–14
	Pts: Wilbekin 28; Rebs: Johnson 11; Asts: Ulubay 4 PIR: Wilbekin 28	Boxscore	Pts: Ragland 18; Rebs: Lacey 10; Asts: Collins 3 PIR: Qvale 11	Arena: Volkswagen Arena; Attendance: 5,240; Referees: Miguel Pérez Pérez (ESP), Matej Boltauzer (SLO), Mehdi Difallah (FRA)
