= 2018 EuroCup Finals =

2018 EuroCup finals
- Event: 2017–18 EuroCup Basketball
| Lokomotiv Kuban | Darüşşafaka |
| (Russia) | (Turkey) |
|---|---|
| 0 | 2 |

First leg
| Lokomotiv Kuban | Darüşşafaka |
|---|---|
| 78 | 81 |
- Date: 10 April 2018
- Venue: Basket-Hall, Krasnodar
- MVP: Scottie Wilbekin
- Attendance: 7,124

Second leg
| Darüşşafaka | Lokomotiv Kuban |
|---|---|
| 67 | 59 |
- Date: 13 April 2018
- Venue: Volkswagen Arena, Istanbul
- Attendance: 5,240

The 2018 EuroCup finals were the concluding games of the 2017–18 EuroCup season, the 16th season of Europe's secondary club basketball tournament organised by Euroleague Basketball, the tenth season since it was renamed from the ULEB Cup to the EuroCup, and the second season under the title sponsorship name of 7DAYS. The first leg was played at the Basket-Hall in Krasnodar, Russia, on 10 April 2018, the second leg will be played at the Volkswagen Arena in Istanbul, Turkey, on 13 April 2018 and the third leg, if necessary, would be played at the Basket-Hall in Krasnodar, Russia, on 16 April 2018, between Russian side Lokomotiv Kuban and Turkish side Darüşşafaka.

It was the first ever Finals appearance ever in any European competition of Darüşşafaka and it the second ever final appearance in EuroCup for Lokomotiv Kuban, who ended third two seasons ago in the Euroleague and arrived to the finals with a perfect balance of 20 wins in 20 matches. However, the firsts beat the Russian by 2–0 in the best-of-three series achieving also the qualification to the 2018–19 EuroLeague.

== Venues ==
| Krasnodar | 2018 EuroCup Finals (Europe) | Istanbul |
| Basket-Hall | 2018 EuroCup Finals (Europe) | Volkswagen Arena |
| Capacity: 7,500 | 2018 EuroCup Finals (Europe) | Capacity: 5,240 |

== Road to the Finals ==
Note: In the table, the score of the finalist is given first (H = home; A = away).

| (Russia) Lokomotiv Kuban | | | | | Round | (Turkey) Darüşşafaka | | | | |
|---|---|---|---|---|---|---|---|---|---|---|
| 1st place (10–0) (Group C) | | | | | Regular season | 1st place (8–2) (Group A) | | | | |
| 1st place (6–0) (Group G) | | | | | Top 16 | 2nd place (5–1) (Group E) | | | | |
| Opponent | Series | 1st leg | 2nd leg | 3rd leg | Playoffs | Opponent | Series | 1st leg | 2nd leg | 3rd leg |
| (Spain) Herbalife Gran Canaria | 2–0 | 79–74 (H) | 80–58 (A) | | Quarterfinals | (Montenegro) Budućnost VOLI | 2–0 | 57–54 (H) | 78–71 (A) | |
| (Italy) Grissin Bon Reggio Emilia | 2–0 | 82–65 (H) | 79–69 (A) | | Semifinals | (Germany) Bayern Munich | 2–0 | 76–74 (H) | 87–83 (H) | |

== First leg ==
| 10 April 2018 | Lokomotiv Kuban (Russia) | 78–81(OT) (Series: 0–1) | (Turkey) Darüşşafaka | Krasnodar |
| 19:00 | Scoring by quarter: 14–15, 21–16, 17–18, 20–23, Overtime: 6–9 |
| | Pts: Kulagin 18; Rebs: Lacey 7 Asts: Kulagin 7 PIR: Kulagin 24 | Boxscore | Pts: Wilbekin 24; Rebs: Cummings 8 Asts: Sant-Roos, Wilbekin 5 PIR: Cummings 25 | Arena: Basket-Hall; Attendance: 7,124; Referees: Damir Javor (SLO), Emilio Pérez Pizarro (ESP), Rain Peerandi (EST) |

| Starters: | | | Pts | Reb | Ast |
|---|---|---|---|---|---|
| PG | 13 | (Russia) Dmitry Khvostov | 0 | 0 | 0 |
| SG | 7 | (United States) Trevor Lacey | 5 | 7 | 0 |
| SF | 1 | (United States) Mardy Collins | 14 | 7 | 4 |
| PF | 10 | (Russia) Vladimir Ivlev | 0 | 0 | 0 |
| C | 41 | (United States) Brian Qvale | 6 | 3 | 0 |
| Reserves: | | | | | |
| PF | 2 | (Russia) Pavel Antipov | 3 | 1 | 0 |
| PG | 3 | (Liberia) Joe Ragland | 10 | 5 | 2 |
| SG | 4 | (Russia) Evgeny Baburin | DNP | | |
| PF | 12 | (Russia) Stanislav Ilnitskiy | 0 | 0 | 0 |
| C | 15 | (United States Virgin Islands) Frank Elegar | 9 | 6 | 0 |
| SG | 19 | (United States) Chris Babb | 13 | 2 | 1 |
| SG | 24 | (Russia) Dmitry Kulagin | 18 | 6 | 7 |
Head coach:
(Serbia) Saša Obradović

| Lokomotiv Kuban | Darüşşafaka |

| Lokomotiv | Statistics | Darüşşafaka |
|---|---|---|
| 19/48 (39.6%) | 2-pt field goals | 23/38 (60.5%) |
| 10/25 (40%) | 3-pt field goals | 6/21 (28.6%) |
| 10/13 (76.9%) | Free throws | 17/27 (63%) |
| 21 | Offensive rebounds | 11 |
| 24 | Defensive rebounds | 25 |
| 45 | Total rebounds | 36 |
| 14 | Assists | 18 |
| 9 | Turnovers | 7 |
| 4 | Steals | 6 |
| 2 | Blocks | 7 |
| 24 | Fouls | 18 |

| Starters: | | | Pts | Reb | Ast |
|---|---|---|---|---|---|
| PG | 1 | (Turkey) Scottie Wilbekin | 24 | 3 | 5 |
| SG | 23 | (Cuba) Howard Sant-Roos | 7 | 2 | 5 |
| SF | 13 | (Turkey) Okben Ulubay | 5 | 1 | 0 |
| PF | 25 | (United States) JaJuan Johnson | 7 | 7 | 1 |
| C | 50 | (Nigeria) Michael Eric | 0 | 2 | 2 |
| Reserves: | | | | | |
| PF | 0 | (United States) Stanton Kidd | 9 | 3 | 1 |
| SG | 3 | (Turkey) Kartal Özmızrak | 0 | 0 | 0 |
| SG | 5 | (Turkey) Muhammed Baygul | 2 | 3 | 0 |
| C | 9 | (Turkey) Emircan Koşut | DNP | | |
| PG | 12 | (United States) Will Cummings | 19 | 8 | 3 |
| PG | 18 | (Turkey) Doğuş Özdemiroğlu | 0 | 0 | 0 |
| C | 19 | (Turkey) Furkan Aldemir | 8 | 5 | 1 |
Head coach:
(Israel) David Blatt

== Second leg ==
| 13 April 2018 | Darüşşafaka (Turkey) | 67–59 (Series: 2–0) | (Russia) Lokomotiv Kuban | Istanbul |
| 19:15 | Scoring by quarter: 21–17, 18–16, 16–12, 12–14 |
| | Pts: Wilbekin 28; Rebs: Johnson 11; Asts: Ulubay 4 PIR: Wilbekin 28 | Boxscore | Pts: Ragland 18; Rebs: Lacey 10; Asts: Collins 3 PIR: Qvale 11 | Arena: Volkswagen Arena; Attendance: 5,240; Referees: Miguel Pérez Pérez (ESP), Matej Boltauzer (SLO), Mehdi Difallah (FRA) |

| Starters: | | | Pts | Reb | Ast |
|---|---|---|---|---|---|
| PG | 1 | (Turkey) Scottie Wilbekin | 28 | 0 | 1 |
| SG | 23 | (Cuba) Howard Sant-Roos | 8 | 6 | 2 |
| SF | 13 | (Turkey) Okben Ulubay | 0 | 1 | 4 |
| PF | 25 | (United States) JaJuan Johnson | 8 | 11 | 1 |
| C | 50 | (Nigeria) Michael Eric | 2 | 3 | 0 |
| Reserves: | | | | | |
| PF | 0 | (United States) Stanton Kidd | 2 | 3 | 0 |
| SG | 3 | (Turkey) Kartal Özmızrak | 3 | 0 | 0 |
| SG | 5 | (Turkey) Muhammed Baygul | 3 | 1 | 0 |
| C | 9 | (Turkey) Emircan Koşut | DNP | | |
| PG | 12 | (United States) Will Cummings | 10 | 3 | 1 |
| PG | 18 | (Turkey) Doğuş Özdemiroğlu | 0 | 0 | 0 |
| C | 19 | (Turkey) Furkan Aldemir | 3 | 2 | 1 |
Head coach:
(Israel) David Blatt

| Darüşşafaka | Lokomotiv |

| Darüşşafaka | Statistics | Lokomotiv |
|---|---|---|
| 11/28 (39.3%) | 2-pt field goals | 19/41 (46.3%) |
| 10/25 (40%) | 3-pt field goals | 4/19 (21.1%) |
| 15/19 (78.9%) | Free throws | 9/12 (75%) |
| 8 | Offensive rebounds | 14 |
| 25 | Defensive rebounds | 26 |
| 33 | Total rebounds | 40 |
| 10 | Assists | 8 |
| 11 | Turnovers | 12 |
| 5 | Steals | 5 |
| 3 | Blocks | 3 |
| 20 | Fouls | 23 |

2017–18 EuroCup champions

Darüşşafaka
(1st title)

| Starters: | | | Pts | Reb | Ast |
|---|---|---|---|---|---|
| PG | 3 | (Liberia) Joe Ragland | 18 | 2 | 0 |
| SG | 24 | (Russia) Dmitry Kulagin | 8 | 7 | 2 |
| SF | 1 | (United States) Mardy Collins | 8 | 5 | 3 |
| PF | 2 | (Russia) Pavel Antipov | 2 | 3 | 1 |
| C | 15 | (United States Virgin Islands) Frank Elegar | 2 | 3 | 0 |
| Reserves: | | | | | |
| SG | 4 | (Russia) Evgeny Baburin | 0 | 2 | 1 |
| SG | 7 | (United States) Trevor Lacey | 6 | 10 | 0 |
| PF | 10 | (Russia) Vladimir Ivlev | 0 | 0 | 0 |
| PF | 12 | (Russia) Stanislav Ilnitskiy | 0 | 0 | 0 |
| PG | 13 | (Russia) Dmitry Khvostov | 0 | 0 | 0 |
| SG | 19 | (United States) Chris Babb | 3 | 1 | 0 |
| C | 41 | (United States) Brian Qvale | 12 | 4 | 1 |
Head coach:
(Serbia) Saša Obradović

== Finals MVP ==
| Pos | Player | Team | Ref |
|---|---|---|---|
| G | (Turkey) Scottie Wilbekin | (Turkey) Darüşşafaka | |

== See also ==
- 2018 EuroLeague Final Four
- 2018 Basketball Champions League Final Four
- 2018 FIBA Europe Cup Final
