= Miss Turkey 2018 =

- Date: September 24, 2017
- Presenters: Dilay Korkmaz
- Venue: Volkswagen Arena Istanbul, Turkey
- Entrants: 20
- Placements: 10
- Winner: Şevval Şahin; Istanbul - 1

The Miss Turkey 2018 held on September 24, 2017 in the Volkswagen Arena Istanbul in Istanbul, Turkey was hosted by Dilay Korkmaz. On the coronation Night 3 major winners were crowned as Miss World Turkey 2018, Miss Universe Turkey 2018 and Miss Supranational Turkey 2018.

At the event, Aslı Sümen crowned her successor Şevval Şahin as Miss World Turkey 2018, Pınar Tartan crowned her successor Tara de Vries as Miss Universe Turkey 2018 for the first time in Miss Turkey and Yasemin Çoklar Crowned her successor Roda Irmak Kalkan as Miss Supranational Turkey 2018 .

== Winner and runners-up ==
Final Results	Contestant
Miss Turkey/ World 2018	1 – Şevval Şahin
Miss Turkey/ Universe 2018	15 – Tara de Vries
Miss Turkey/ Supranational 2018	10 – Roda Irmak Kalkan
Top 10	3 – Sena Yağmur Çelik; 5 – Cansu Erdönmez; 11 – Çiçek Arsu; 14 – Işıl Coşkun; 17 – Tuna Salon; 18 – Buse Akar; 19 – Lale Zuzanna Onuk

== Contestants ==
The official Top 20 Candidates of Miss Turkey 2017:

No.	Name	Age	Height	Hometown
1	Şevval Şahin	19	182 cm (5 ft 11 1/2 in)	Istanbul
2	Deren Ertaş	20	180 cm (5 ft 11 in)	Kırklareli
3	Sena Yağmur Çelik	20	180 cm (5 ft 11 in)	Istanbul
4	Göksu Oral	22	180 cm (5 ft 11 in)	Istanbul
5	Cansu Erdönmez	24	178 cm (5 ft 10 in)	Istanbul
6	Bilge Uluğ	22	178 cm (5 ft 10 in)	Istanbul
7	Yasemin Aşkın	23	178 cm (5 ft 10 in)	
8	Gülsüm İlayda Özülke	21	176 cm (5 ft 9 1/2 in)	Denizli
9	Aylin Sabrina White	21	173 cm (5 ft 8 in)	
10	Roda Irmak Kalkan	18	172 cm (5 ft 7 1/2 in)	Istanbul
11	Çiçek Arsu	23	171 cm (5 ft 7 1/2 in)	Gaziantep
12	Beray Kocabaş	26	174 cm (5 ft 8 1/2 in)	Istanbul
13	Dilara Yılmaz	21	173 cm (5 ft 8 in)	
14	Işıl Coşkun	20	176 cm (5 ft 9 1/2 in)	Istanbul
15	Tara Madelein De Vries	19	177 cm (5 ft 9 1/2 in)	Istanbul
16	Meltem Kırbaş	21	177 cm (5 ft 9 1/2 in)	İzmir
17	Tuna Salon	22	179 cm (5 ft 10 1/2 in)	Balıkesir
18	Buse Akar	21	178 cm (5 ft 10 in)	Marmaris
19	Lale Zuzanna Onuk	20	180 cm (5 ft 11 in)	Istanbul
20	Damla Özdemir	21	182 cm (5 ft 11 1/2 in)	Istanbul
