= 2017–18 EuroCup Basketball =

Tournament

2017–18 7DAYS EuroCup^{1}
- Season: 2017–18
- Games played: 184
- Teams: 24

Regular season
- Season MVP: (United States) Scottie Wilbekin

Finals
- Champions: (Turkey) Darüşşafaka (1st title)
- Runners-up: (Russia) Lokomotiv Kuban
- Semi-finalists: (Germany) Bayern Munich (Italy) Grissin Bon Reggio Emilia
- Finals MVP: (United States) Scottie Wilbekin

Awards
- Coach of the Year: (Serbia) Saša Obradović
- Rising Star: (Bosnia and Herzegovina) Džanan Musa

Statistical leaders
Points	(United States) Scottie Wilbekin	19.7
Rebounds	(United States) Richard Hendrix	7.5
Assists	(United States) Chris Kramer	7.4
Index Rating	(United States) Scottie Wilbekin	21.3

Records
- Biggest home win: Bayern Munich 93–57 Lietkabelis (18 October 2017)
- Biggest away win: Fiat Torino 60–89 Darüşşafaka (1 November 2017)
- Highest scoring: Herbalife Gran Canaria 128–129 ASVEL (27 December 2017)
- Winning streak: 20 games Lokomotiv Kuban
- Losing streak: 7 games Partizan NIS ratiopharm Ulm
- Highest attendance: 8,878; Alba Berlin 86–68 RETAbet Bilbao Basket (27 December 2017)
- Lowest attendance: 377; Galatasaray Odeabank 92–97 Alba Berlin (6 February 2018)
- All statistics correct as of 13 April 2018.^{1} Sponsored name, referring to 7DAYS.

The 2017–18 EuroCup Basketball, also known as 7DAYS EuroCup for sponsorship reasons, season was the 16th season of Euroleague Basketball's secondary level professional club basketball tournament. It will be the tenth season since it was renamed from the ULEB Cup to the EuroCup, and the second season under the title sponsorship name of 7DAYS.

The 2018 EuroCup Finals were played between Darüşşafaka and Lokomotiv Kuban, and won by Darüşşafaka, which was their first EuroCup title. As the winners of the 2017–18 EuroCup Basketball, Darüşşafaka qualified for the European top-tier level 2018–19 EuroLeague season.

== Format changes ==
For the 2017–18 season, the EuroCup went back to the initial format for the 2016–17 season which includes 24 teams playing in four regular season groups, with 16 teams advancing to the Top 16 phase, featuring four groups of four teams each. Eight teams will qualify for best-of-three quarterfinals, which will be followed by best-of-three semifinals and best-of-three finals.

== Team allocation ==
A total of 24 teams from 12 countries participated in the 2017–18 EuroCup Basketball.

=== Distribution ===
The table below shows the default access list.

	Teams entering in this round	Teams advancing from previous round
Regular season (24 teams)	3 highest-placed teams from Adriatic; 3 highest-placed teams from Russia; 3 highest-placed teams from Spain; 2 highest-placed teams from France; 2 highest-placed teams from Germany; 2 highest-placed teams from Italy; 2 highest-placed teams from Turkey; 1 highest-placed team from Greece; 1 highest-placed team from Israel; 1 highest-placed team from Lithuania; 1 highest-placed team from Poland; 3 wild cards	
Top 16 (16 teams)		4 group winners from the regular season; 4 group runners-up from the regular season; 4 group third-placed teams from the regular season; 4 group fourth-placed teams from the regular season
Playoffs (8 teams)		4 group winners from the Top 16; 4 group runners-up from the Top 16

=== Teams ===
The labels in the parentheses show how each team qualified for the place of its starting round:

- 1st, 2nd, 3rd, etc.: League position after Playoffs
- WC: Wild card

Regular season
(Croatia) Cedevita (2nd)	(Spain) Herbalife Gran Canaria (7th)	(Germany) ratiopharm Ulm (3rd)	(Turkey) Darüşşafaka (4th)
(Serbia) Partizan NIS (3rd)	(Spain) MoraBanc Andorra (8th)	(Germany) Bayern Munich (4th)	(Turkey) Galatasaray Odeabank (6th)
(Montenegro) Budućnost VOLI (4th)	(Spain) RETAbet Bilbao Basket (10th)	(Germany) Alba Berlin (WC)	(Turkey) Tofaş (WC)
(Russia) Zenit Saint Petersburg (3rd)	(France) Levallois Metropolitans (3rd)	(Italy) Dolomiti Energia Trento (2nd)	(Lithuania) Lietkabelis (2nd)
(Russia) Lokomotiv Kuban (4th)	(France) ASVEL (4th)	(Italy) Grissin Bon Reggio Emilia (6th)	(Lithuania) Lietuvos rytas (WC)
(Russia) UNICS (5th)	(France) Limoges CSP (WC)	(Italy) Fiat Torino (WC)	(Israel) Hapoel Jerusalem (1st)

Notes

1. ABA League (ABA): Cedevita, Partizan NIS and Budućnost VOLI qualified through the ABA League.
2. Spain (ESP): MoraBanc Andorra is a club based in Andorra (which does not qualify for European competitions), but participate in European competitions through one of the berths for Spain (any coefficient points they earn count toward Spain).

== Round and draw dates ==
The schedule of the competition is as follows.

Phase	Round	Draw date	First leg	Second leg	Third leg
Regular season	Round 1	6 July 2017	10–11 October 2017		
Regular season	Round 2	6 July 2017	17–18 October 2017		
Regular season	Round 3	6 July 2017	24–25 October 2017		
Regular season	Round 4	6 July 2017	31 October–1 November 2017		
Regular season	Round 5	6 July 2017	7–8 November 2017		
Regular season	Round 6	6 July 2017	14–15 November 2017		
Regular season	Round 7	6 July 2017	5–6 December 2017		
Regular season	Round 8	6 July 2017	12–13 December 2017		
Regular season	Round 9	6 July 2017	19–20 December 2017		
Regular season	Round 10	6 July 2017	26–27 December 2017		
Top 16	Round 1	6 July 2017	2–3 January 2018		
Top 16	Round 2	6 July 2017	9–10 January 2018		
Top 16	Round 3	6 July 2017	16–17 January 2018		
Top 16	Round 4	6 July 2017	24 January 2018		
Top 16	Round 5	6 July 2017	30–31 January 2018		
Top 16	Round 6	6 July 2017	6–7 February 2018		
Playoffs	Quarterfinals	6 July 2017	6 March 2018	9 March 2018	14 March 2018
Playoffs	Semifinals	6 July 2017	20 March 2018	23 March 2018	28 March 2018
Playoffs	Finals	6 July 2017	10 April 2018	13 April 2018	16 April 2018

=== Draw ===
The draw was held on 6 July 2017, 13:30 CEST, at the Mediapro Auditorium in Barcelona. The 24 teams were drawn into four groups of six, with the restriction that teams from the same country could not be drawn against each other. For this purpose, Adriatic League worked as only one country. For the draw, the teams were seeded into six pots, in accordance with the Club Ranking, based on their performance in European competitions during a three-year period and the lowest possible position that any club from that league could occupy in the draw was calculated by adding the results of the worst performing team from each league.

Pot 1
Team	Pts
(Russia) Lokomotiv Kuban	133
(Spain) Herbalife Gran Canaria	125
(Turkey) Galatasaray Odeabank	120
(Russia) UNICS	113

Pot 4
Team	Pts
(Italy) Dolomiti Energia Trento	63^{†}
(Italy) Grissin Bon Reggio Emilia	63^{†}
(Italy) Fiat Torino	63^{†}
(Spain) RETAbet Bilbao Basket	60^{†}

Pot 2
Team	Pts
(Germany) Bayern Munich	96
(Russia) Zenit Saint Petersburg	90
(Turkey) Darüşşafaka	90
(Germany) Alba Berlin	86

Pot 5
Team	Pts
(Spain) MoraBanc Andorra	60^{†}
(Lithuania) Lietkabelis	54
(France) Limoges CSP	48
(Germany) ratiopharm Ulm	43^{†}

Pot 3
Team	Pts
(Croatia) Cedevita	85
(Turkey) Tofaş	80^{†}
(Israel) Hapoel Jerusalem	71^{†}
(Lithuania) Lietuvos rytas	65

Pot 6
Team	Pts
(Montenegro) Budućnost VOLI	42
(France) Levallois Metropolitans	35
(Serbia) Partizan NIS	35^{†}
(France) ASVEL	25^{†}

Notes

^† Indicates teams with points applying the minimum for the league they play.

== Regular season ==
Location of teams of the 2017–18 EuroCup regular season.
Red: Group A; Green: Group B; Blue: Group C; Yellow: Group D.

In each group, teams played against each other home-and-away in a round-robin format. The group winners, runners-up, third-placed teams and fourth-placed teams advanced to the Top 16, while the fifth-placed teams and sixth-placed teams were eliminated. The rounds were on 10–11 October, 17–18 October, 24–25 October, 31 October–1 November, 7–8 November, 14–15 November, 5–6 December, 12–13 December, 19–20 December and 26–27 December 2017.

=== Group A ===
Pos	Team	Pld	W	L	PF	PA	PD	Qualification	DAC	UNK	CED	TOR	AND	LVM
1	(Turkey) Darüşşafaka	10	8	2	805	716	+89	Advance to Top 16	—	78–69	85–83	75–77	85–77	100–67
2	(Russia) UNICS	10	7	3	794	760	+34	Advance to Top 16	75–79	—	78–61	101–93	89–80	76–68
3	(Croatia) Cedevita	10	5	5	821	785	+36	Advance to Top 16	89–83	94–74	—	83–86	91–73	94–79
4	(Italy) Fiat Torino	10	5	5	793	842	−49	Advance to Top 16	60–89	72–79	65–87	—	92–86	92–86
5	(Spain) MoraBanc Andorra	10	3	7	784	810	−26		68–69	68–76	78–71	83–77	—	79–61
6	(France) Levallois Metropolitans	10	2	8	755	839	−84		64–69	67–77	91–81	73–79	99–92	—

Source: EuroCup Basketball
Legend: Blue = home team win; Red = away team win.
Rules for classification: All points scored in extra period(s) were not counted in the standings, nor for any tie-break situation.

=== Group B ===
Pos	Team	Pld	W	L	PF	PA	PD	Qualification	BAY	GSO	REG	BUD	LIE	JER
1	(Germany) Bayern Munich	10	9	1	881	749	+132	Advance to Top 16	—	86–78	83–58	85–82	93–57	111–85
2	(Turkey) Galatasaray Odeabank	10	5	5	795	770	+25	Advance to Top 16	69–86	—	82–72	82–61	73–78	87–68
3	(Italy) Grissin Bon Reggio Emilia	10	5	5	739	747	−8	Advance to Top 16	90–82	74–71	—	77–71	82–85	61–63
4	(Montenegro) Budućnost VOLI	10	5	5	776	776	0	Advance to Top 16	60–76	87–78	82–74	—	76–62	92–75
5	(Lithuania) Lietkabelis	10	4	6	761	812	−51		87–88	77–84	75–82	86–79	—	86–72
6	(Israel) Hapoel Jerusalem	10	2	8	767	865	−98		83–91	81–91	66–79	81–86	93–81	—

Source: EuroCup Basketball
Legend: Blue = home team win; Red = away team win.
Rules for classification: All points scored in extra period(s) were not counted in the standings, nor for any tie-break situation.

=== Group C ===
Pos	Team	Pld	W	L	PF	PA	PD	Qualification	LOK	LRY	ALB	LIM	RBB	PAR
1	(Russia) Lokomotiv Kuban	10	10	0	851	710	+141	Advance to Top 16	—	77–68	75–59	81–55	102–86	99–64
2	(Lithuania) Lietuvos rytas	10	6	4	855	796	+59	Advance to Top 16	85–93	—	94–73	92–76	83–93	93–75
3	(Germany) Alba Berlin	10	6	4	847	812	+35	Advance to Top 16	84–89	93–86	—	78–84	86–68	111–85
4	(France) Limoges CSP	10	5	5	787	804	−17	Advance to Top 16	61–63	69–71	65–73	—	86–74	92–83
5	(Spain) RETAbet Bilbao Basket	10	2	8	821	899	−78		69–91	79–96	86–94	91–98	—	92–96
6	(Serbia) Partizan NIS	10	1	9	811	951	−140		83–93	80–91	80–96	98–101	67–83	—

Source: EuroCup Basketball
Legend: Blue = home team win; Red = away team win.
Rules for classification: All points scored in extra period(s) were not counted in the standings, nor for any tie-break situation.

=== Group D ===
Pos	Team	Pld	W	L	PF	PA	PD	Qualification	ASV	TRE	ZEN	HGC	TOF	ULM
1	(France) ASVEL	10	7	3	856	814	+42	Advance to Top 16	—	79–67	88–85	68–84	84–74	108–77
2	(Italy) Dolomiti Energia Trento	10	6	4	830	797	+33	Advance to Top 16	85–75	—	103–81	79–76	88–91	77–66
3	(Russia) Zenit Saint Petersburg	10	6	4	862	864	−2	Advance to Top 16	89–92	81–70	—	90–85	84–82	90–78
4	(Spain) Herbalife Gran Canaria	10	5	5	884	837	+47	Advance to Top 16	128–129	85–76	97–87	—	92–71	97–84
5	(Turkey) Tofaş	10	4	6	826	861	−35		82–81	79–91	76–80	98–94	—	100–84
6	(Germany) ratiopharm Ulm	10	2	8	830	915	−85		84–94	84–94	93–95	97–87	83–73	—

Source: EuroCup Basketball
Legend: Blue = home team win; Red = away team win.
Rules for classification: All points scored in extra period(s) were not counted in the standings, nor for any tie-break situation.

== Top 16 ==
In each group, teams play against each other home-and-away in a round-robin format. The group winners and runners-up advanced to the Playoffs, while the third-placed teams and fourth-placed teams were eliminated. The rounds were on 2–3 January, 9–10 January, 16–17 January, 23–24 January, 30–31 January and 6–7 February 2018.

=== Group E ===
Pos	Team	Pld	W	L	PF	PA	PD	Qualification	DAC	HGC	ALB	GSO
1	(Turkey) Darüşşafaka	6	5	1	480	412	+68	Advance to quarterfinals	—	88–70	82–70	77–63
2	(Spain) Herbalife Gran Canaria	6	4	2	507	484	+23	Advance to quarterfinals	78–70	—	100–81	76–87
3	(Germany) Alba Berlin	6	2	4	469	483	−14		66–79	72–75	—	95–62
4	(Turkey) Galatasaray Odeabank	6	1	5	448	525	−77		65–84	86–108	92–97	—

Source: EuroCup Basketball
Legend: Blue = home team win; Red = away team win.
Rules for classification: All points scored in extra period(s) will not be counted in the standings, nor for any tie-break situation.

=== Group F ===
Pos	Team	Pld	W	L	PF	PA	PD	Qualification	BAY	ZEN	TOR	LRY
1	(Germany) Bayern Munich	6	5	1	526	480	+46	Advance to quarterfinals	—	95–78	107–81	81–68
2	(Russia) Zenit Saint Petersburg	6	4	2	549	528	+21	Advance to quarterfinals	78–80	—	95–84	113–100
3	(Italy) Fiat Torino	6	2	4	479	543	−64		90–76	73–87	—	83–77
4	(Lithuania) Lietuvos rytas	6	1	5	527	530	−3		85–87	96–98	101–68	—

Source: EuroCup Basketball
Legend: Blue = home team win; Red = away team win.
Rules for classification: All points scored in extra period(s) will not be counted in the standings, nor for any tie-break situation.

=== Group G ===
Pos	Team	Pld	W	L	PF	PA	PD	Qualification	LOK	BUD	TRE	CED
1	(Russia) Lokomotiv Kuban	6	6	0	470	392	+78	Advance to quarterfinals	—	77–66	97–69	69–64
2	(Montenegro) Budućnost VOLI	6	4	2	451	420	+31	Advance to quarterfinals	62–68	—	79–66	84–52
3	(Italy) Dolomiti Energia Trento	6	2	4	452	481	−29		71–74	105–106	—	83–72
4	(Croatia) Cedevita	6	0	6	400	480	−80		60–85	75–78	77–81	—

Source: EuroCup Basketball
Legend: Blue = home team win; Red = away team win.
Rules for classification: All points scored in extra period(s) will not be counted in the standings, nor for any tie-break situation.

=== Group H ===
Pos	Team	Pld	W	L	PF	PA	PD	Qualification	REG	UNK	ASV	LIM
1	(Italy) Grissin Bon Reggio Emilia	6	4	2	444	414	+30	Advance to quarterfinals	—	76–75	75–68	87–54
2	(Russia) UNICS	6	4	2	447	437	+10	Advance to quarterfinals	69–71	—	88–84	88–78
3	(France) ASVEL	6	3	3	461	424	+37		68–64	77–83	—	92–78
4	(France) Limoges CSP	6	1	5	417	494	−77		80–71	66–69	61–87	—

Source: EuroCup Basketball
Legend: Blue = home team win; Red = away team win.
Rules for classification: All points scored in extra period(s) will not be counted in the standings, nor for any tie-break situation.

== Playoffs ==
In the playoffs, teams played against each other must win two games to win the series. Thus, if one team wins two games before all three games have been played, the game that remains is omitted. The team that finished in the higher Top 16 place will play the first and the third (if it is necessary) legs of the series at home. The playoffs involves the eight teams which qualified as winners and runners-up of each of the four groups in the Top 16.

=== Bracket ===
Quarterfinals
(Russia) Lokomotiv Kuban	79	80
(Spain) Herbalife Gran Canaria	74	58
(Italy) Grissin Bon Reggio Emilia	75	77	105
(Russia) Zenit Saint Petersburg	61	91	99
(Turkey) Darüşşafaka	57	78
(Montenegro) Budućnost VOLI	54	71
(Germany) Bayern Munich	83	73	91
(Russia) UNICS	75	80	81

Semifinals
(Russia) Lokomotiv Kuban	82	79
(Italy) Grissin Bon Reggio Emilia	65	69
(Turkey) Darüşşafaka	76	87
(Germany) Bayern Munich	74	83

Finals
(Russia) Lokomotiv Kuban	78	59
(Turkey) Darüşşafaka	81	67

=== Quarterfinals ===
The first legs were played on 6 March, the second legs were played on 9 March and the third legs, if necessary, were played on 14 March 2018.

Team 1	Series	Team 2	Game 1	Game 2	Game 3
Darüşşafaka (Turkey)	2–0	(Montenegro) Budućnost VOLI	57–54	78–71	
Bayern Munich (Germany)	2–1	(Russia) UNICS	83–75	73–80	91–81
Lokomotiv Kuban (Russia)	2–0	(Spain) Herbalife Gran Canaria	79–74	80–58	
Grissin Bon Reggio Emilia (Italy)	2–1	(Russia) Zenit Saint Petersburg	75–61	77–91	105–99

=== Semifinals ===
The first legs were played on 20 March, the second legs were played on 23 March, and the third legs were scheduled for 28 March 2018.

Team 1	Series	Team 2	Game 1	Game 2	Game 3
Darüşşafaka (Turkey)	2–0	(Germany) Bayern Munich	76–74	87–83	
Lokomotiv Kuban (Russia)	2–0	(Italy) Grissin Bon Reggio Emilia	82–65	79–69	

=== Finals ===
The first leg will be played on 10 April, the second leg will be played on 13 April, and the third leg was scheduled to 16 April 2018, if necessary.

Team 1	Series	Team 2	Game 1	Game 2	Game 3
Lokomotiv Kuban (Russia)	0–2	(Turkey) Darüşşafaka	78–81	59–67	

== Attendances ==
Pos	Team	Total	High	Low	Average	Change
1	(Israel) Hapoel Jerusalem	38,785	8,403	7,169	7,757	−9.7%
2	(Germany) Alba Berlin	62,050	8,878	6,322	7,756	+14.5%
3	(Lithuania) Lietuvos rytas	48,529	8,593	4,031	6,066	+13.2%
4	(Germany) Bayern Munich	60,075	6,239	4,327	5,461	+0.5%
5	(France) ASVEL	42,711	5,560	4,932	5,339	n/a
6	(Russia) Lokomotiv Kuban	47,298	7,124	2,205	4,300	−2.5%
7	(Spain) RETAbet Bilbao Basket	20,319	4,375	3,711	4,064	−24.9%
8	(Spain) Herbalife Gran Canaria	36,526	5,567	2,725	4,058	+8.6%
9	(France) Limoges CSP	32,274	4,574	2,946	4,034	n/a
10	(Russia) Zenit Saint Petersburg	36,243	5,156	2,527	4,027	+39.3%
11	(Lithuania) Lietkabelis	19,823	4,381	3,515	3,965	+2.6%
12	(Russia) UNICS	33,286	5,644	2,856	3,698	−1.0%^{1}
13	(Germany) ratiopharm Ulm	15,947	3,699	2,501	3,189	−22.4%
14	(Turkey) Tofaş	15,830	3,457	2,879	3,166	n/a
15	(Italy) Grissin Bon Reggio Emilia	34,726	4,465	2,446	3,157	n/a
16	(Spain) MoraBanc Andorra	15,642	3,479	2,462	3,128	n/a
17	(Montenegro) Budućnost VOLI	25,794	4,202	2,135	2,866	+28.8%
18	(Italy) Fiat Torino	20,993	3,901	1,850	2,624	n/a
19	(Turkey) Darüşşafaka	26,098	4,750	1,258	2,610	−44.2%^{1}
20	(Serbia) Partizan NIS	9,430	2,784	661	1,886	n/a
21	(Italy) Dolomiti Energia Trento	13,248	1,997	1,335	1,656	n/a
22	(France) Levallois Metropolitans	7,893	2,447	1,160	1,579	n/a
23	(Turkey) Galatasaray Odeabank	9,863	4,889	377	1,233	−74.3%^{1}
24	(Croatia) Cedevita	9,362	1,580	895	1,170	+16.3%
	League total	682,746	8,878	377	3,731	−13.3%

Updated to match(es) played on 10 April 2018. Source: EuroCup Basketball
Notes:
1: 2016–17 season average applied to EuroLeague games.

== Awards ==
=== 7DAYS EuroCup MVP ===
Player	Team	Ref.
(Bosnia and Herzegovina) Scottie Wilbekin	(Turkey) Darüşşafaka	

=== 7DAYS EuroCup Finals MVP ===
Player	Team	Ref.
(Bosnia and Herzegovina) Scottie Wilbekin	(Turkey) Darüşşafaka	

=== All–7DAYS EuroCup Teams ===
All–7DAYS EuroCup First Team		All–7DAYS EuroCup Second Team		Ref
Player	Team	Player	Team	Ref
(United States) Devin Booker	(Germany) Bayern Munich	(Czech Republic) Ondřej Balvín	(Spain) Herbalife Gran Canaria	
(Australia) Ryan Broekhoff	(Russia) Lokomotiv Kuban	(Montenegro) Nikola Ivanović	(Montenegro) Budućnost VOLI	
(Spain) Quino Colom	(Russia) UNICS	(United States) JaJuan Johnson	(Turkey) Darüşşafaka	
(Italy) Amedeo Della Valle	(Italy) Grissin Bon Reggio Emilia	(Russia) Dmitry Kulagin	(Russia) Lokomotiv Kuban	
(Bosnia and Herzegovina) Scottie Wilbekin	(Turkey) Darüşşafaka	(Slovakia) Kyle Kuric	(Russia) Zenit Saint Petersburg	

=== Coach of the Year ===
Player	Team	Ref.
(Serbia) Saša Obradović	(Russia) Lokomotiv Kuban	

=== Rising Star ===
Player	Team	Ref.
(Bosnia and Herzegovina) Džanan Musa	(Croatia) Cedevita	

=== Regular Season MVP ===
Player	Team	Ref.
(Bosnia and Herzegovina) Scottie Wilbekin	(Turkey) Darüşşafaka	

=== Top 16 MVP ===
Player	Team	Ref.
(Slovakia) Kyle Kuric	(Russia) Zenit Saint Petersburg	

=== Quarterfinals MVP ===
Player	Team	Ref.
(Russia) Dmitry Kulagin	(Russia) Lokomotiv Kuban	

=== Semifinals MVP ===
Player	Team	Ref.
(Bosnia and Herzegovina) Scottie Wilbekin	(Turkey) Darüşşafaka	

=== MVP of the Round ===
Regular Season

Round	Player	Team	PIR	Ref.
1	(United States) Luke Sikma	(Germany) Alba Berlin	31	
2	(Lithuania) Rokas Giedraitis	(Lithuania) Lietuvos rytas	31	
2	(United States) Jalen Reynolds	(Italy) Grissin Bon Reggio Emilia	31	
3	(United States) Nigel Williams-Goss	(Serbia) Partizan NIS	34	
4	(United States) Peyton Siva	(Germany) Alba Berlin	31	
4	(United States) Trevor Lacey	(Russia) Lokomotiv Kuban	31	
5	(Lithuania) Adas Juškevičius	(Lithuania) Lietkabelis	38	
6	(United States) Chris Kramer	(Lithuania) Lietuvos rytas	38	
7	(United States) John Roberson	(France) ASVEL	30	
8	(Germany) Danilo Barthel	(Germany) Bayern Munich	33	
9	(France) Boris Diaw	(France) Levallois Metropolitans	29	
10	(United States) John Roberson (2)	(France) ASVEL	44	

Top 16

Round	Player	Team	PIR	Ref.
1	(United States) Dustin Hogue	(Italy) Dolomiti Energia Trento	40	
2	(Slovakia) Kyle Kuric	(Russia) Zenit Saint Petersburg	40	
3	(United States) Devin Booker	(Germany) Bayern Munich	38	
4	(Lithuania) Martynas Echodas	(Lithuania) Lietuvos rytas	29	
5	(Germany) Danilo Barthel (2)	(Germany) Bayern Munich	42	
6	(United States) Peyton Siva (2)	(Germany) Alba Berlin	26	

Quarterfinals

Game	Player	Team	PIR	Ref.
1	(United States) Jalen Reynolds (2)	(Italy) Grissin Bon Reggio Emilia	29	
2	(Russia) Dmitry Kulagin	(Russia) Lokomotiv Kuban	34	
3	(United States) Chris Wright	(Italy) Grissin Bon Reggio Emilia	34	

Semifinals

Game	Player	Team	PIR	Ref.
1	(Nigeria) Michael Eric	(Turkey) Darüşşafaka	30	
2	(Bosnia and Herzegovina) Scottie Wilbekin	(Turkey) Darüşşafaka	44	

Finals

Game	Player	Team	PIR	Ref.
1	(United States) Will Cummings	(Turkey) Darüşşafaka	25	

== See also ==
- 2017–18 EuroLeague
- 2017–18 Basketball Champions League
- 2017–18 FIBA Europe Cup
