= List of VTB United League season steals leaders =

In basketball, a steal is a "defensive action" that causes the opponent to turn the ball over. The VTB United League's steals title is awarded to the player with the highest steals per game average in a given regular season.

== Steals leaders ==
Season	Player	Position (Note: The player's primary position is listed.)	Nationality	Team	Country	SPG	Ref(s)
2009–10	Victor Khryapa	PF	Russia	CSKA Moscow	Russia	2.67	
2010–11	Fred House	SG	United States	Azovmash	Ukraine	3.20	
2011–12	Andrey Komarovskiy	SF	Russia	Enisey Krasnoyarsk	Russia	2.25	
2012–13	Tywain McKee	PG	United States	Triump Lyubertsy	Russia	3.00	
2013–14	Cuthbert Victor	PF	U.S. Virgin Islands	Krasny Oktyabr	Russia	1.89	
2014–15	D. J. Cooper	PG	United States	Enisey Krasnoyarsk	Russia	1.97	
2015–16	Howard Sant-Roos	SF	Cuba	ČEZ Nymburk	Czech Republic	2.10	
2016–17	Dijon Thompson	SF	United States	Nizhny Novgorod	Russia	2.85	
2017–18	Justin Carter	SG	United States	Astana	Kazakhstan	1.73	
2018–19	Chavaughn Lewis	SG	United States	Kalev/Cramo	Estonia	2.08	
2019–20	Alex Renfroe	PG	United States	Zenit Saint Petersburg	Russia	2.54	
2020–21	Nigel Williams-Goss	PG	United States	Lokomotiv Kuban	Russia	2.45	
2021–22	Anthony Hickey	SG	United States	Astana	Kazakhstan	2.47	
2022–23	Isaiah Ross	SG	United States	Trepça	Kosovo	2.32	
