= Howard Sant-Roos =

Cuban basketball player (born 1991)

No. 8 – UCAM Murcia
- Position: Small forward / point guard
- League: Liga ACB

Personal information
- Born: February 13, 1991 (age 35) Havana, Cuba
- Listed height: 6 ft 7 in (2.01 m)
- Listed weight: 187 lb (85 kg)

Career information
- NBA draft: 2013: undrafted
- Playing career: 2011–present

Career history
- 2011–2015: Assigeco Casalpusterlengo
- 2011–2013: → SG Braunschweig
- 2012–2013: → Phantoms Braunschweig
- 2013–2014: → Novipiù Casale Monferrato
- 2015–2017: Nymburk
- 2017–2018: Darüşşafaka
- 2018–2020: AEK Athens
- 2020: CSKA Moscow
- 2020–2022: Panathinaikos
- 2022–2023: Casademont Zaragoza
- 2023–present: Murcia

Career highlights
- FIBA Champions League Defensive Player of the Year (2024); Greek League champion (2021); Greek Cup winner (2021); Greek Supercup winner (2021); Greek League steals leader (2020); 2× Greek League Defensive Player of the Year (2019, 2021); FIBA Intercontinental Cup champion (2019); All-Champions League Defensive Team (2019); EuroCup champion (2018); 2× NBL champion (2016, 2017); Czech Cup winner (2017); VTB United League steals leader (2016)

Howard Powell Sant-Roos Olano (born February 13, 1991) is a Cuban professional basketball player for UCAM Murcia of the Spanish Liga ACB. At a height of 2.01 m (6 ft 7 in) tall, he plays at the small forward position, but he can also operate as a point guard.

== Early career ==
Sant-Roos began playing club basketball at the youth and amateur levels in Italy. Sant-Roos started his pro career in 2011, in the German 3rd Division, with SG Braunschweig; the farm team of the German 1st Division (BBL) team Phantoms Braunschweig. He was coached there by Kostas Flevarakis.

== Professional career ==
=== ČEZ Nymburk (2015–2017) ===
On June 29, 2015, Sant-Roos signed a two-year deal with the Czech team ČEZ Nymburk. Sant-Roos helped the team to win the Czech Cup in 2017, and the Czech League titles in 2016 and 2017. On June 30, 2017, Sant-Roos joined the NBA's Denver Nuggets' Summer League roster, for the 2017 NBA Summer League.

=== Darüşşafaka (2017–2018) ===
On July 20, 2017, Sant-Roos signed a one-year deal with the Turkish Super League team Darüşşafaka. In 52 combined league games played (Turkish BSL and EuroCup) during the 2017–18 season, he averaged 7.3 points, 4.6 rebounds and 3.6 assists in the Turkish BSL season, and 8.6 points, 4.2 rebounds and 3.9 assists in the EuroCup season. Sant-Roos won the 2018 EuroCup with Daçka.

=== AEK Athens (2018–2020) ===
On August 3, 2018, Sant-Roos signed with the Greek Basket League team AEK Athens, for the 2018–19 season. With the Greek club, he won the FIBA Intercontinental Cup in 2019 and gained the reputation of being the best perimeter defender of the team. He averaged 6.6 points, 2.4 assists and 1.2 steals with AEK in the Greek League. On July 14, 2019, Sant-Roos renewed his contract with the Greek club through 2021.

=== CSKA Moscow (2020) ===
On January 11, 2020, Sant-Roos officially signed with the Russian EuroLeague powerhouse CSKA Moscow through the 2022–23 season, after a buy-out of €500,000 was submitted to and accepted by AEK. On July 19, CSKA officially opted-out of their contract with Sant-Roos, releasing him in the process.

=== Panathinaikos (2020–2022) ===
On July 21, 2020, Sant-Roos signed with Greek Basket League powerhouse and seven-times winner of the EuroLeague Panathinaikos for the 2020–2021 season, with an option for a second year.

On August 16, 2021, he renewed his contract with the Greek club through 2023. During his second season with the Greens, in 32 league games, he averaged 7.2 points, 3.8 rebounds, 3.5 assists and 1.5 steals, playing around 24 minutes per contest. Additionally, in 31 EuroLeague games, he averaged 7.2 points, 3.1 rebounds, 2 assists and 1.2 steals, playing around 23 minutes per contest.

On August 24, 2022, Sant-Roos officially parted ways with the Greek club after two seasons.

=== Basket Zaragoza (2022–2023) ===
On August 27, 2022, Sant-Roos signed with Casademont Zaragoza of the Liga ACB.

=== UCAM Murcia (2023–present) ===
On July 21, 2023, Sant-Roos signed with UCAM Murcia of the Spanish Liga ACB.

== Personal life ==
Howard was born on February 13, 1991, in the neighborhood of Santo Suárez, municipality October 10. As a boy, he grew up in a small house on Serrano Street, just around the corner of the San Carlos Sports Complex Court.

== Career statistics ==
Legend
| GP | Games played | GS | Games started | MPG | Minutes per game |
| FG% | Field-goal percentage | 3P% | 3-point field-goal percentage | FT% | Free-throw percentage |
| RPG | Rebounds per game | APG | Assists per game | SPG | Steals per game |
| BPG | Blocks per game | PPG | Points per game | PIR | Performance index rating |
| **Bold** | Career high |

=== EuroLeague ===
| Year | Team | GP | GS | MPG | FG% | 3P% | FT% | RPG | APG | SPG | BPG | PPG | PIR |
|---|---|---|---|---|---|---|---|---|---|---|---|---|---|
| 2019–20 | CSKA Moscow | 10 | 3 | 18.9 | .333 | .174 | **.867** | 2.5 | 1.7 | 1.2 | .0 | 5.5 | 5.3 |
| 2020–21 | Panathinaikos | **32** | **27** | **24.3** | .396 | **.348** | .809 | 2.4 | **3.7** | **1.5** | **.2** | **7.2** | **8.9** |
| 2021–22 | Panathinaikos | 31 | 22 | 23.4 | **.406** | .253 | .821 | **3.1** | 2.0 | 1.2 | **.2** | **7.2** | 8.5 |
| Career | | 73 | 52 | 23.2 | .392 | .294 | .822 | 2.7 | 2.7 | 1.3 | .2 | 6.9 | 8.2 |

=== Domestic leagues ===
| Year | Team | League | GP | MPG | FG% | 3P% | FT% | RPG | APG | SPG | BPG | PPG |
|---|---|---|---|---|---|---|---|---|---|---|---|---|
| 2014–15 | Novipiù Casale Monferrato | Serie A2 Basket | 28 | **32.8** | .440 | .322 | .748 | 6.1 | **4.0** | 2.1 | **.6** | **14.9** |
| 2016–17 | ČEZ Nymburk | NBL Czech Republic | **40** | 23.4 | **.494** | **.385** | **.875** | 6.0 | 3.4 | 2.1 | .6 | 13.6 |
| 2018–19 | AEK Athens B.C. | Greek Basket League | 34 | 26.4 | .427 | .323 | .787 | 4.4 | 2.5 | 1.2 | .4 | 7.7 |
| 2019–20 | AEK Athens B.C. | Greek Basket League | 13 | 30.4 | .404 | .325 | .667 | **6.2** | 3.4 | **2.2** | .2 | 9.0 |
| 2020–21 | Panathinaikos | Greek Basket League | 26 | 22.0 | .396 | .325 | .800 | 3.0 | 2.9 | 1.5 | .2 | 7.1 |
| Career | | All Leagues | 173 | 26.0 | .438 | .342 | .802 | 4.6 | 3.3 | 1.7 | .4 | 10.1 |

== Highlights and awards ==
=== Pro career ===
- FIBA Intercontinental Cup champion: 2019
- EuroCup champion: 2018
- 2 x Czech NBL champion: 2016, 2017
- Czech Cup: 2017
- Greek League winner: 2021
- Greek Cup winner: 2021
- Greek Super Cup winner: 2021

=== Individual ===
- 2x Greek Basket League Best Defender: 2018–19, 2020-21
- VTB United League Steals Leader (2016)
- Basketball Champions League Game Day MVP: 2019–20 Game Day 9
