= Anthony Hickey =

American basketball player

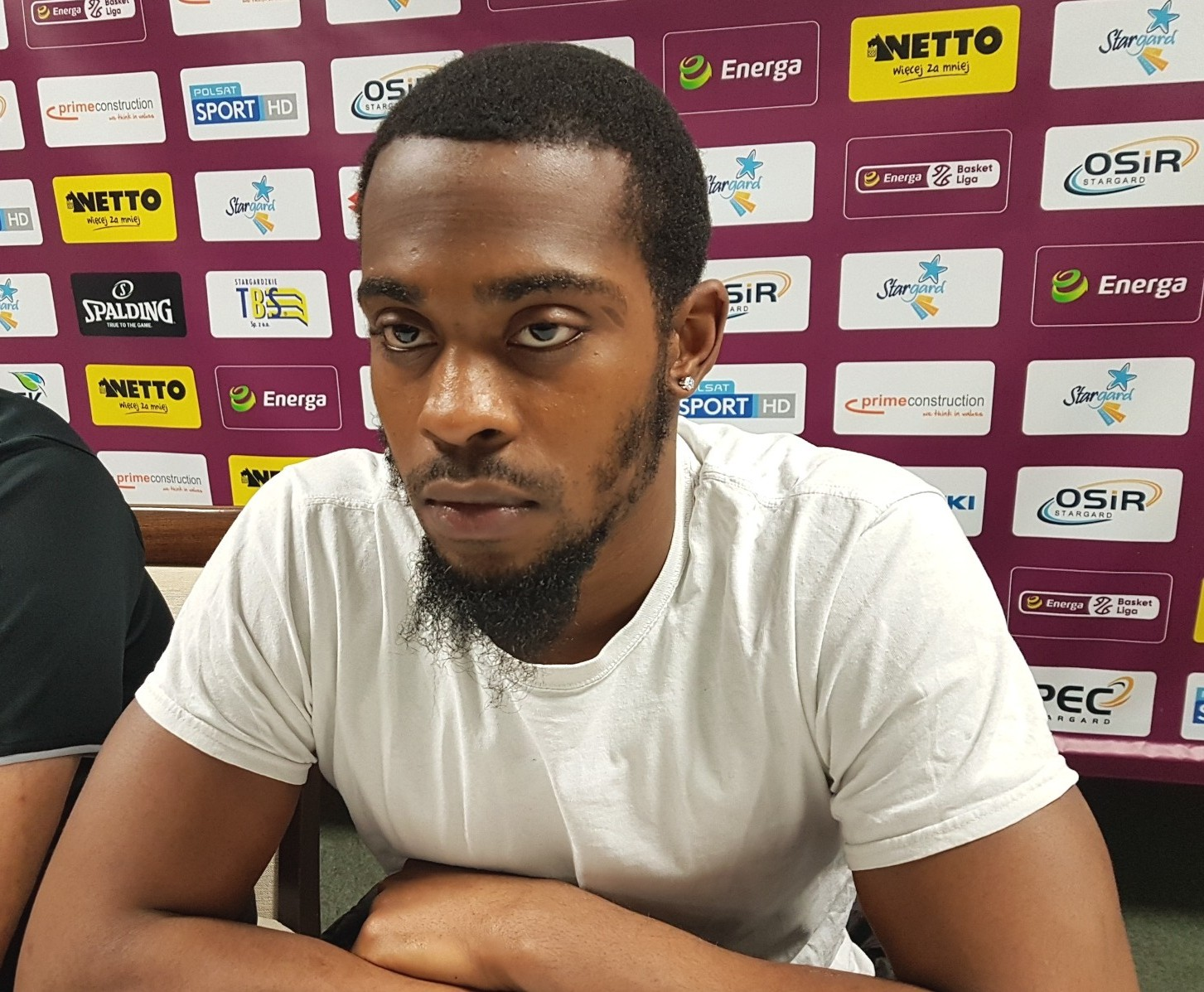
- Hickey with Spójnia Stargard

No. 2 – Śląsk Wrocław
- Position: Point guard
- League: Polish Basketball League

Personal information
- Born: November 22, 1992 (age 33)
- Listed height: 5 ft 11 in (1.80 m)
- Listed weight: 182 lb (83 kg)

Career information
- High school: Christian County (Hopkinsville, Kentucky)
- College: LSU (2011–2014); Oklahoma State (2014–2015)
- NBA draft: 2015: undrafted
- Playing career: 2015–present

Career history
- 2015–2016: Asseco Gdynia
- 2016: Petrolina AEK Larnaca
- 2016–2017: Apollon Patras
- 2017–2018: Enosis Neon Paralimni
- 2018: Rethymno Cretan Kings
- 2018–2019: Spójnia Stargard
- 2019: Rethymno Cretan Kings
- 2019: Skyliners Frankfurt
- 2019–2020: Larisa
- 2020–2021: CSO Voluntari
- 2021–2022: BC Astana
- 2022–2023: Hapoel Haifa
- 2023–2026: APU Udine
- 2026–present: Śląsk Wrocław

Career highlights
- VTB United League Performance of the Season (2022); VTB United League steals leader (2022); Cypriot League steals leader (2018); Cypriot Super Cup winner (2016); SEC All-Freshman team (2012); SEC All-Defensive team (2013); Kentucky Mr. Basketball (2011)

Anthony Hickey (born November 22, 1992) is an American professional basketball player for Śląsk Wrocław of the Polish Basketball League (PLK). He played college basketball for the LSU Tigers and the Oklahoma State Cowboys.

== High school career ==
In high school, Hickey was named the 2011 Kentucky Mr. Basketball winner while playing for Christian County High School. His team also won the State Championship his senior year.

== College career ==
=== LSU ===
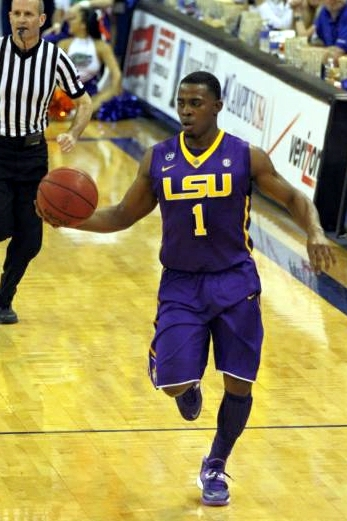
Hickey, playing with LSU .

As a freshman for LSU in 2011–12, Hickey averaged 8.9 points, 3.6 rebounds and 3.8 assists per game. He started 31 of 33 games and played in a first round loss in the 2012 National Invitation Tournament. The following year, Hickey was suspended for a time in the beginning of the season for university-related disciplinary reasons, which drew some national attention. His absence was short-lived, and throughout his sophomore season he ranked toward the top of the national leader board in steals per game average. Head coach and LSU alumnus Johnny Jones, who played for the Tigers from 1980 to 1984 and registered 136 steals himself, conceded that his own spots in the LSU record book were dropping because of Hickey: "As tenacious and ferocious as he is guarding the basketball, I think it says a lot about him. I think it's wonderful. I think it's great. I think there were only two areas – steals and assists – that I was still kind of lingering around in. But I'm dropping pretty steadily because of the play of this guy."

=== Oklahoma State ===
On May 13, 2014, after his junior season in college, it was announced that Hickey was transferring schools. In the 2012–13 NCAA Division I season he was a sophomore who finished as that year's third-highest steals-per game leader in the nation (2.93 spg).

== Professional career ==
In August 2015, Hickey joined Polish club Asseco Gdynia. With Gdynia, he averaged 14 points, 3.4 rebounds and 2.8 assists per game.

On August 1, 2016, he joined Petrolina AEK Larnaca of the Cypriot Basketball League. After just two games, he left the club and joined Apollon Patras of the Greek Basket League, replacing Chris Jones on the team's squad.

On November 2, 2017, Hickey joined Enosis Neon Paralimni of the Cyprus Basketball Division 1.

On April 21, 2018, Hickey joined Rethymno Cretan Kings B.C. of the Greek Basket League. He signed with Spójnia Stargard of the Polish Basketball League on August 12, 2018. He returned to Rethymno Cretan Kings during the season. On April 4, 2019, Hickey recorded the first triple double in the Greek Basket League after 18 seasons. Hickey posted 14 points, 10 rebounds and 16 assists and became the first player after Torraye Braggs to have a triple double.

On July 11, 2019, he signed with the Skyliners Frankfurt of the Basketball Bundesliga.

On November 18, 2019, Hickey returned to Greece for Larisa, replacing Scottie Reynolds. He spent the 2020–21 season in Romania with CSO Voluntari, averaging 18.2 points, 8.0 assists, 4.0 rebounds, and 2.7 assists per game. On August 16, 2021, Hickey signed with Astana of the Kazakhstan Championship, the VTB United League, and the FIBA Asia Champions Cup.

On June 30, 2022, he signed with Hapoel Haifa from the Israeli Basketball Premier League.

On July 10, 2025, he signed with APU Udine of the Lega Basket Serie A (LBA).

On August 20, 2026, he signed with Śląsk Wrocław of the Polish Basketball League (PLK).
