= JaJuan Johnson =

American basketball player (born 1989)

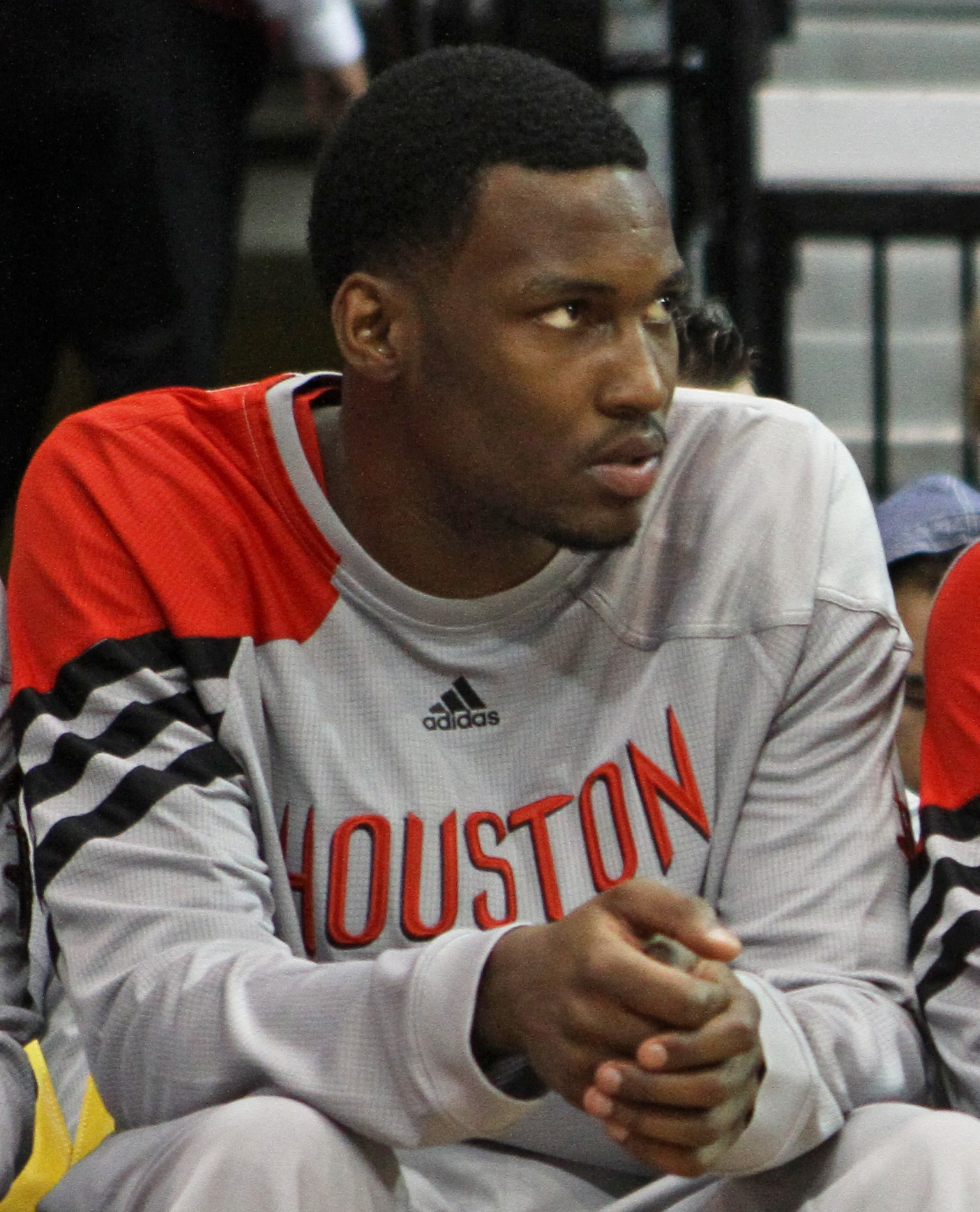
- Johnson with the Houston Rockets in 2012

No. 25 – Bashkimi
- Position: Power forward / center
- League: Kosovo Basketball Superleague

Personal information
- Born: February 8, 1989 (age 37) Indianapolis, Indiana, U.S.
- Listed height: 6 ft 10 in (2.08 m)
- Listed weight: 221 lb (100 kg)

Career information
- High school: Franklin Central (Indianapolis, Indiana)
- College: Purdue (2007–2011)
- NBA draft: 2011: 1st round, 27th overall pick
- Drafted by: New Jersey Nets
- Playing career: 2011–present

Career history
- 2011–2012: Boston Celtics
- 2012: Fort Wayne Mad Ants
- 2012–2013: Canton Charge
- 2013: Idaho Stampede
- 2013–2014: Pistoia
- 2014: Changsha Bank Guangdong
- 2014–2015: Beşiktaş
- 2015: Krasny Oktyabr
- 2015–2017: Cantù
- 2017–2018: Darüşşafaka
- 2018–2019: Lokomotiv Kuban
- 2019–2020: Bahçeşehir Koleji
- 2020–2021: Bayern Munich
- 2021–2022: Türk Telekom
- 2022–2023: BCM Gravelines-Dunkerque
- 2023–2024: New Basket Brindisi
- 2024: Hapoel Eilat
- 2025: Kazma
- 2026–present: Bashkimi

Career highlights
- EuroCup champion (2018); All-EuroCup Second Team (2018); Consensus first-team All-American (2011); Pete Newell Big Man Award (2011); Big Ten Player of the Year (2011); Big Ten Defensive Player of the Year (2011); 2× First-team All-Big Ten (2009, 2011); Second-team All-Big Ten (2010); 3× Big Ten All-Defensive team (2009–2011)
- Stats at NBA.com
- Stats at Basketball Reference

JaJuan Markeis Johnson (born February 8, 1989) is an American professional basketball player for Bashkimi of the Kosovo Basketball Superleague. He played college basketball for the Purdue Boilermakers. During his sophomore season, he was named a first-team All-Big Ten selection. As a junior, he was named a second-team All-Big Ten selection. As a senior, a first-team consensus All-American as well as the Big Ten Player of the Year and Big Ten Defensive Player of the Year.

== High school career ==
Johnson was born in Indianapolis, Indiana. He attended Franklin Central High School in Indianapolis, where he played for head coach Mark James. Tall for his age, Johnson played on the B-team in the 7th and 8th grade. He finished his senior year averaging 20.6 points and 9.1 rebounds a game for the Flashes. Johnson was named to the Indiana All-Star Team with future NBA players, Eric Gordon, Jeff Teague, Robbie Hummel, and E'Twaun Moore.

Considered a four-star recruit by Rivals.com, Johnson was listed as the No. 9 power forward and the No. 42 player in the nation in 2007.

== College career ==
=== 2007–08 ===
The 6'10", 215 lb forward/center committed to Purdue University to play under Boilermakers head coach Matt Painter as part of a top five recruiting class, along with fellow Indiana All-Stars Robbie Hummel, E'Twaun Moore and Scott Martin. He averaged 5.4 points and 3.1 rebounds a game, while starting in 17 of the 34 games in which he appeared in during his freshman season. He helped the Boilermakers to a second straight NCAA tournament appearance, including a game against Baylor in the first round, where he scored 10 points, grabbed 8 rebounds and blocked 2 shots in 20 minutes.

=== 2008–09 ===
Johnson averaged 13.4 points (second on team) and led the conference with 2.2 blocks a game, for which, he was named a First-Team All-Big Ten selection as well as to the Big Ten All-Defensive Team along with teammate, Chris Kramer. He also led the conference shooting 54 percent from the field. Johnson opened conference play with a 15 rebound effort against Illinois on December 30, 2008. On February 3, 2009, he recorded a career high 30 points at Ohio State and had his career 7 blocks in a game at Northwestern on January 15, 2009. He recorded five double-doubles on the season, all coming in conference play. Johnson led Purdue to the program's first Big Ten tournament championship and was named to the all-tournament team and helped lead them to a Sweet Sixteen appearance. In the second-round game in the NCAA Tournament against Washington in the last seconds, he blocked back-to-back shots to seal the win while adding 22 points and a total of 4 blocks. Finishing with a 27–10 record, he is one of four Boilermakers to share the school record for most games played in a season. He also moved amongst Joe Barry Carroll in the Purdue records with the third most blocks in a season with 78.

=== 2009–10 ===
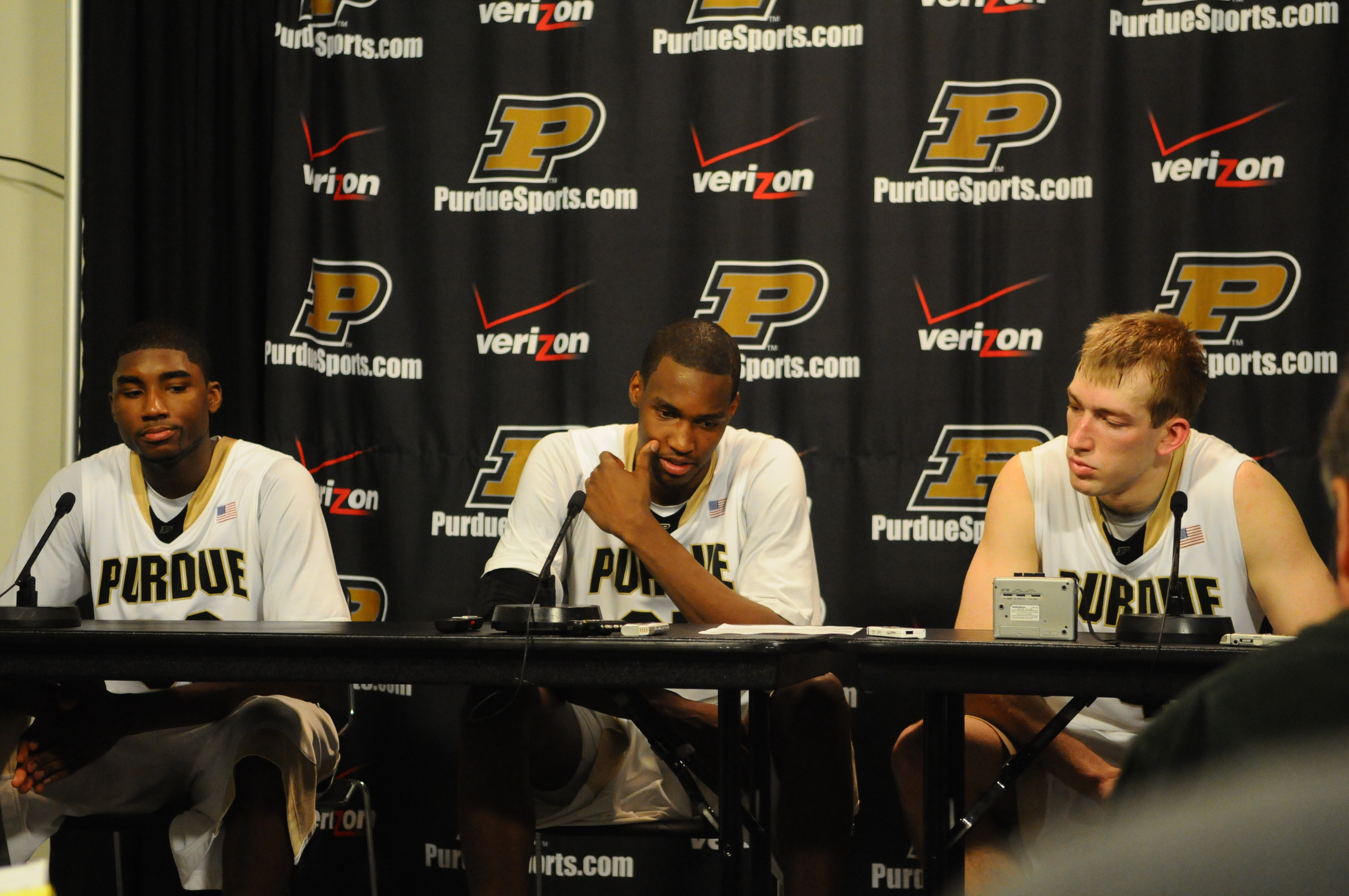
E'Twaun Moore, Johnson and Robbie Hummel at press conference (2010-01-23)

Johnson considered entering the 2009 NBA draft, but made a verbal commitment to return for the junior year. He began his junior season as a preseason first team all-Big Ten selection by CBS Sports. In the season, he recorded nine double-doubles, while leading Purdue to its best start in 16 years (14–0). Johnson was named the Big Ten Player of the Week in late January, averaging 22.5 points and 9.5 rebounds in two games (2–0). On February 9, 2010, Johnson recorded his 1,000th career point in a road game win against #10 ranked Michigan State. Finishing with a 14–4 record in conference play, Johnson led Purdue to its first Big Ten title in fourteen years, climaxing with a road win against Penn State, where he had 21 points, 10 rebounds, 3 blocks, and shot 11–14 at the line. In an average of 31.3 minutes a game, Johnson averaged 15.4 points (3rd on team), 7.3 rebounds (1st), and 1 steal per game. Johnson shot 72 percent at the line, while leading the top ten ranked Purdue squad with 2 blocks a game and shooting 51 percent from the floor. Johnson was named Second-Team All-Big Ten and received consecutive Big Ten All-Defensive Team honors at the end of the regular season. With Purdue receiving a 4 seed in the NCAA tournament, Johnson led the Boilermakers in the First Round victory against Siena, where he had 23 points, 15 rebounds, and 3 blocks, leading to consecutive Sweet Sixteen appearances after beating Texas A&M in overtime. In his final game of his junior season, Johnson had team highs with 23 points, making 10 of 17 attempts, while tallying 5 rebounds and 4 blocks in a losing effort against Duke. Johnson ended this junior season with the second most career blocks in school history with 184, after Joe Barry Carroll's 349 from 1977 to 1980. Johnson held the third highest average in school history with 1.7 blocks per game, behind Carroll and Russell Cross. He spent the following summer practicing with Team USA.

=== 2010–11 ===
Johnson, along with teammate E'Twaun Moore, entered the 2010 NBA draft, but withdrew and returned to school after scouts projected him as a second-round pick. JaJuan entered his senior season as an AP preseason All-American. He recorded twelve double-doubles on the season and recorded a career high of 31 points against Indiana State. On February 27, Johnson achieved career highs with 17 rebounds and 7 blocks against Michigan State. He scored in double-figures every game, which included twenty two 20+ games. JaJuan was named a Sporting News midseason first-team All-American, along with the likes of Nolan Smith, Jordan Hamilton, Kemba Walker, and fellow Big Ten player, Jared Sullinger. In his senior season, JaJuan was the only player in the nation with career numbers of more than 1,900 points, 850 rebounds, and 250 blocks. On March 7, Johnson was named Big Ten Player of the Year and also Big Ten Defensive Player of the Year, as well as being selected for the First Team All-Big Ten along with teammate E'Twaun Moore. He led the Big Ten in scoring and in blocks, as well as having the nation's highest scoring average for a player at the center position. With a 3 seed in the NCAA tournament, Purdue faced St. Peter's in the First Round, where JaJuan scored 16 points and grabbed a career postseason-high 16 rebounds. In his last game as a Boilermaker, JaJuan had 25 points and 14 rebounds against Virginia Commonwealth in an 18-point loss. JaJuan averaged 20.5 points (1st on team), 8.6 rebounds (1st), 2.3 blocks (1st), 1 assist, 1 steal, and shot 49.5 percent from the floor and 81 percent from the line (1st). He led Purdue to a 26–8 record and a 2nd-place finish in conference play in his last season as a Boilermaker and was named a Consensus first-team All-American, Purdue's first since Glenn Robinson and seventeenth overall. He also became the first Boilermaker to be given the Pete Newell Big Man Award, an award given to the year's best big man. He was picked to the First Team All-America by Fox Sports.

=== Career notes ===
Johnson finished his career at Purdue as the seventh highest scorer in school history (1,919), averaging 13.7 points, 6.1 rebounds, 2 blocks, .7 assists, and .7 steals. He shares school records with games in a season (37), total games (140), and games won (107). He finished 2nd in school history in career blocks with 263, as well as tallying 854 rebounds. On November 29, 2011, Johnson appeared in dedication of the eleventh number-banner to be displayed at Mackey Arena, which displayed his last name and jersey #25 for being named a consensus All-American his senior season.

== Professional career ==
=== Boston Celtics (2011–12) ===
JaJuan Johnson was drafted by the New Jersey Nets as the 27th pick in the 2011 NBA draft and subsequently traded to the Boston Celtics along with a 2014 second-round pick for the rights to MarShon Brooks. Johnson received limited playing time throughout the course of the 2011–2012 season. On February 12, 2012, in a 95–91 win over the Chicago Bulls, Johnson shot 6-of-13 for a season-high 12 points to go along with four rebounds, two steals and a block. The Celtics valued his raw talent, but inconsistency led to the lack of minutes he would see the rest of the season.

=== D-League (2012–13) ===
On July 20, 2012, Johnson was traded to the Houston Rockets in a three team deal. He was waived by the Rockets on October 29, 2012.

On November 2, 2012, Johnson was selected by the Fort Wayne Mad Ants with the first pick in the 2012 NBA Development League Draft.

On December 28, 2012, Johnson was traded to the Canton Charge in exchange for Luke Harangody.

On February 25, 2013, Johnson was traded to the Idaho Stampede.

=== Pistoia Basket (2013–14) ===
In August 2013, Johnson signed with Giorgio Tesi Pistoia of the Lega Basket Serie A; he helped lead them to an 8th-place finish in the league standings and a spot in the playoffs. While the team was bounced from the playoffs by eventual champion Milan, Johnson led the team in scoring in one playoff game and twice led them in rebounding.

=== Beşiktaş (2014–15) ===
On June 23, 2014, it was announced that Johnson had signed with the Turkish team Beşiktaş Integral Forex for the 2014–15 Turkish Basketball League season. He joined Beşiktaş along with Engin Atsür and Caner Erdeniz. He made his season debut on October 11, against Darüşşafaka S.K. and finished the game with 26 points, 7 rebounds, and 1 steal. Johnson, who shot 10-of-17 from the field, led his team in scoring and rebounding as a starting power forward. However, his team ultimately fell, 71–74. Johnson continued to play a key role for Beşiktaş as he represented the team for the 2014–15 edition of the EuroCup Basketball. In a home game vs the Slovenian club KK Olimpija, he scored a game-high 20 points and ended with 8 rebounds and 5 steals. On October 22, Johnson recorded the first double-double of his year in a Eurocup contest against B.C. Zenit Saint Petersburg. He went for 21 points and a game-high 12 rebounds in 39 minutes of playing time at Sibur Arena in Saint Petersburg, Russia. Beşiktaş captured the victory, 90–86.

=== Krasny Oktyabr (2015) ===
On July 31, 2015, Johnson signed with Krasny Oktyabr of Russia. On November 23, 2015, he parted ways with the club.

=== Pallacanestro Cantù (2015–17) ===
On November 26, 2015, he signed with the Italian club Pallacanestro Cantù.

=== Darüşşafaka (2017–18) ===
On July 14, 2017, Johnson signed a two-year deal with the Turkish club Darüşşafaka. On April 4, 2018, Johnson was named All-EuroCup Second Team. Johnson helped Darüşşafaka to win the 2017–18 EuroCup title after beating Lokomotiv Kuban in the Finals. In 52 games played during the 2017–18 season (both in the EuroCup and all Turkish competitions), Johnson averaged 14.4 points, 6.2 rebounds, 1 assist and 1 block per game.

=== Lokomotiv Kuban (2018–2019) ===
On July 11, 2018, Johnson officially signed with the Russian team Lokomotiv Kuban for the 2018–19 season.

=== Bahçeşehir Koleji (2019–2020) ===
On August 19, 2019, he has signed with Bahçeşehir Koleji of the Basketbol Süper Ligi (BSL).

=== Bayern Munich (2020–2021) ===
On July 30, 2020, he has signed with Bayern Munich of the Basketball Bundesliga (BBL) and the Euroleague.

=== Türk Telekom (2021–2022) ===
On August 3, 2021, he has signed with Türk Telekom of the Basketball Super League.

=== BCM Gravelines-Dunkerque (2022–2023) ===
On June 25, 2022, he signed with BCM Gravelines-Dunkerque of the French LNB Pro A.

=== New Basket Brindisi (2023–2024) ===
On July 9, 2023, he signed with New Basket Brindisi of the Lega Basket Serie A.

== Career statistics ==
Legend
| GP | Games played | GS | Games started | MPG | Minutes per game |
| FG% | Field goal percentage | 3P% | 3-point field goal percentage | FT% | Free throw percentage |
| RPG | Rebounds per game | APG | Assists per game | SPG | Steals per game |
| BPG | Blocks per game | PPG | Points per game | **Bold** | Career high |

=== Regular season ===
| Year | Team | GP | GS | MPG | FG% | 3P% | FT% | RPG | APG | SPG | BPG | PPG |
|---|---|---|---|---|---|---|---|---|---|---|---|---|
| 2011–12 | Boston | 36 | 0 | 8.3 | .446 | .000 | .667 | 1.6 | .2 | .1 | .4 | 3.2 |
| Career | | 36 | 0 | 8.3 | .446 | .000 | .667 | 1.6 | .2 | .1 | .4 | 3.2 |
