= Okben Ulubay =

Turkish basketball player (born 1996)

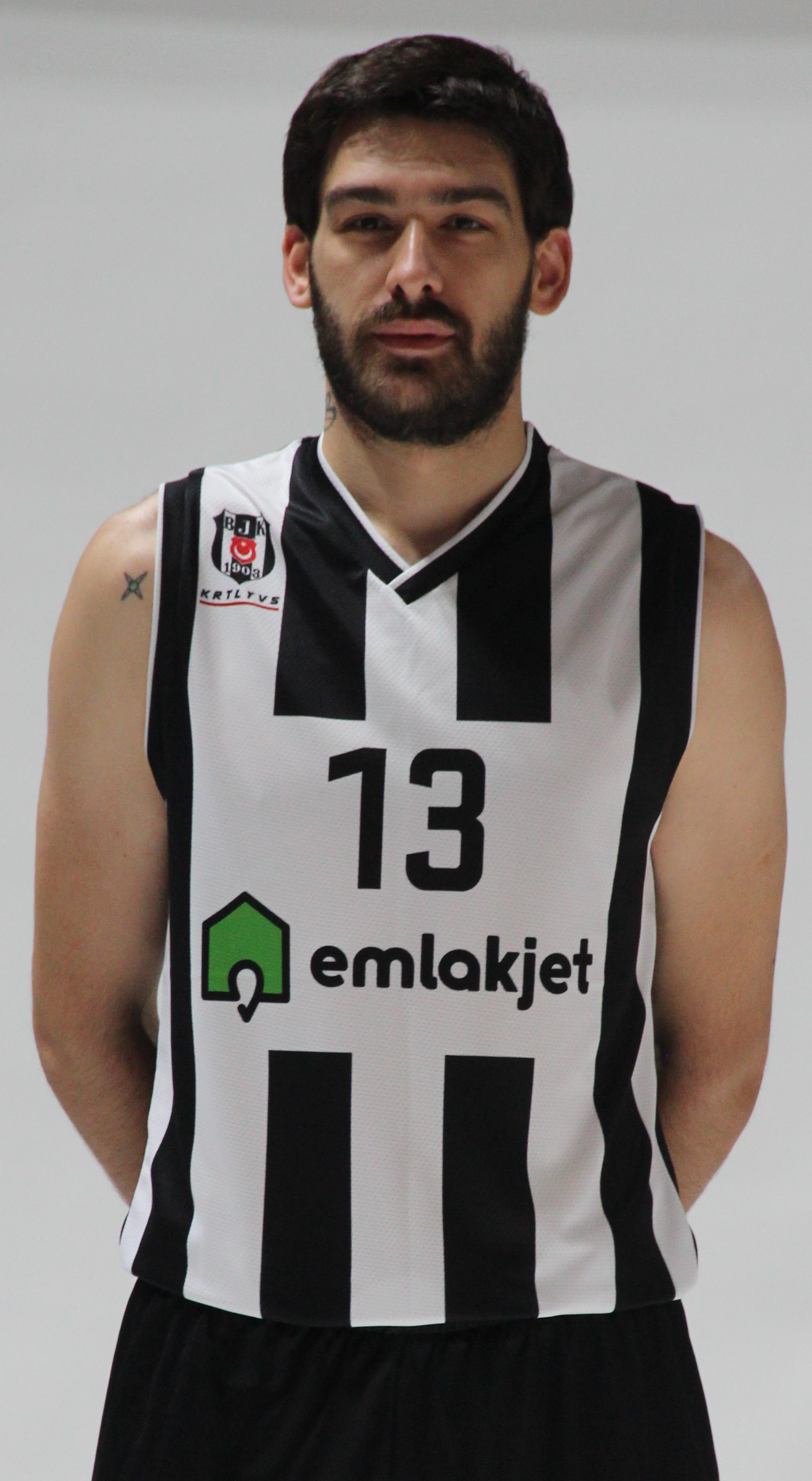

No. 4 – Pizza Bulls Bordo Bandırma
- Position: Small forward
- League: BSL

Personal information
- Born: May 25, 1996 (age 30) Bakırköy, Istanbul, Turkey
- Listed height: 2.00 m (6 ft 7 in)
- Listed weight: 86 kg (190 lb)

Career information
- NBA draft: 2018: undrafted
- Playing career: 2013–present

Career history
- 2013–2016: Anadolu Efes
- 2016–2017: Yeşilgiresun Belediye
- 2017–2019: Darüşşafaka
- 2019–2020: FMP
- 2021: Petkim Spor
- 2021–2022: Galatasaray Nef
- 2022–2023: Beşiktaş
- 2023–2024: Türk Telekom
- 2024–2025: Trabzonspor
- 2025–present: Bandırma Bordo Basketbol

Career highlights
- Türkiye Basketbol Ligi champion (2025); EuroCup champion (2018); BSL All-Star (2017); FIBA Europe Under-16 Championship MVP (2012)
Medals
Men's basketball
Representing Turkey
FIBA Europe Under-20 Championship
Bronze medal – third place	2016 Finland	U20 team
Bronze medal – third place	2015 Italy	U20 team
FIBA Under-19 Basketball World Cup
Bronze medal – third place	2015 Greece	U19 team
FIBA Europe Under-18 Championship
Gold medal – first place	2014 Turkey	U18 team
Gold medal – first place	2013 Latvia	U18 team
FIBA Europe Under-16 Championship
Gold medal – first place	2012 Lithuania	U16 team

Okben Ulubay (born May 25, 1996) is a Turkish professional basketball player for Pizza Bulls Bordo Bandırma of the Basketbol Süper Ligi (BSL). He mainly plays at the small forward position, but he also has the ability to play as a shooting guard.

== Early career ==
Ulubay started playing basketball with the youth academies of the Turkish club, Efes Istanbul when he was five. He continued to play for the junior and youth teams of Efes while growing up.

== Professional career ==
In 2012, Ulubay signed a seven-year contract with the senior men's club of Efes Istanbul. In 2013, he played in his first BSL game with Efes. He also played with the Turkish 2nd Division team Pertevniyal, which was at the time the farm team of Efes, via a dual license.

=== KK FMP ===
On July 4, 2019, Ulubay signed a two-year contract with Serbian team FMP. On 24 December 2020, FMP parted ways with him.

=== Petkim Spor ===
On January 5, 2021, he has signed with Petkim Spor of the Turkish Basketball Super League.

=== Galatasaray Nef ===
On August 11, 2021, he has signed with Galatasaray Nef of the Basketball Super League.

=== Beşiktaş ===
On July 23, 2022, he has signed with Beşiktaş Icrypex of the Basketbol Süper Ligi (BSL).

=== Türk Telekom ===
On June 26, 2023, he signed with Türk Telekom of the Turkish Basketbol Süper Ligi (BSL).

=== Trabzonspor ===
On September 28, 2024, he signed with Trabzonspor of the Türkiye Basketbol Ligi (TBL). He renewed his contract with the team on July 7, 2025, signing a new one-year deal.

=== Bandırma Bordo ===
On October 31, 2025, he signed with Bandırma Bordo Basketbol of the Türkiye Basketbol Ligi (TBL).

== Career statistics ==
Legend
GP	Games played	GS	Games started	MPG	Minutes per game
FG%	Field-goal percentage	3P%	3-point field-goal percentage	FT%	Free-throw percentage
RPG	Rebounds per game	APG	Assists per game	SPG	Steals per game
BPG	Blocks per game	PPG	Points per game	PIR	Performance index rating
**Bold**	Career high

=== EuroLeague ===
Year	Team	GP	GS	MPG	FG%	3P%	FT%	RPG	APG	SPG	BPG	PPG	PIR
2014–15	Anadolu Efes	**2**	**2**	**17.2**	**.556**	**.333**	**.500**	**2.5**	**1.0**	**.5**	**1**	**6**	**6.5**
2016–17	Darüşşafaka	**2**	0	1.4	.000	.000	.000	.0	.0	.0	.0	.0	.0
Career		2	2	17.2	.556	.333	.500	2.5	1.0	.5	1	6	6.5
