= Scottie Wilbekin =

American-Turkish basketball player (born 1993)

- Wilbekin with the Beşiktaş in 2026

No. 12 – Beşiktaş Fuzul
- Position: Point guard / shooting guard
- League: BSL; EuroLeague

Personal information
- Born: April 5, 1993 (age 33) Gainesville, Florida, U.S.
- Listed height: 6 ft 2 in (1.88 m)
- Listed weight: 176 lb (80 kg)

Career information
- High school: The Rock School (Gainesville, Florida)
- College: Florida (2010–2014)
- NBA draft: 2014: undrafted
- Playing career: 2014–present

Career history
- 2014–2015: Cairns Taipans
- 2015: AEK Athens
- 2015–2018: Darüşşafaka
- 2018–2022: Maccabi Tel Aviv
- 2022–2026: Fenerbahçe
- 2026–present: Beşiktaş

Career highlights
- EuroLeague champion (2025); EuroCup champion (2018); EuroCup MVP (2018); EuroCup Finals MVP (2018); All-EuroCup First Team (2018); EuroCup Top Scorer (2018); 2× Turkish League champion (2024, 2025); 3× Israeli League champion (2019–2021); Turkish Cup winner (2024); Israeli Cup winner (2021); 2× Israeli League Cup winner (2020, 2021); Israeli League Finals MVP (2021); 2× All-Israeli League First Team (2020, 2021); All-NBL First Team (2015); All-Israeli League Second Team (2022); Israeli League Cup MVP (2020); Third-team All-American – AP, SN, NABC (2014); SEC Player of the Year (2014); First-team All-SEC (2014); 2× SEC All-Defensive Team (2013, 2014)
- Stats at Basketball Reference

Scottie Jordan Wilbekin (born April 5, 1993) is an American-born naturalized Turkish professional basketball player for Beşiktaş of the Turkish Basketbol Süper Ligi (BSL) and the EuroLeague. He played college basketball for the Florida Gators, where he was named the Southeastern Conference Player of the Year in 2014. Wilbekin played professional basketball in Australia, Greece, Turkey and Israel. He led Darüşşafaka to win the 2018 EuroCup title, while earning the EuroCup Finals and the Regular Season MVP awards.

== College career ==
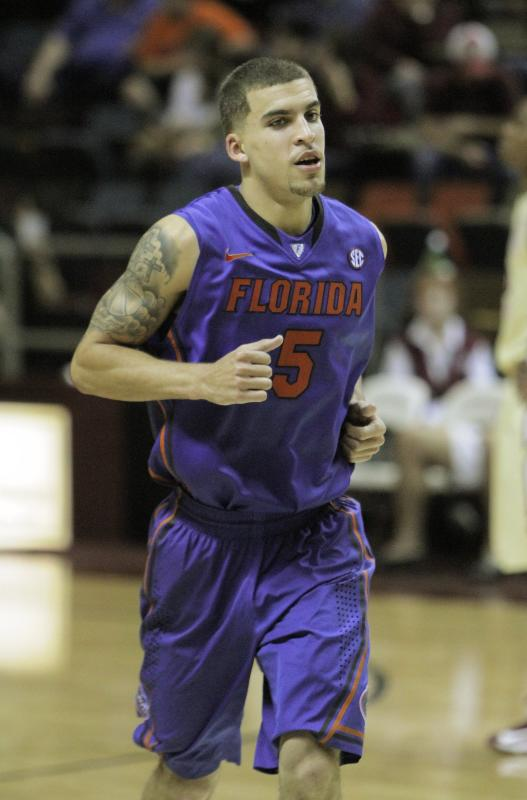
Wilbekin with the Florida Gators in December 2012

After skipping his senior year at The Rock, Wilbekin accepted an athletic scholarship to attend the University of Florida in Gainesville, Florida, where he played for coach Billy Donovan's Gators teams from 2010 to 2014. During his 2013–14 senior season, he led the Florida Gators to the Southeastern Conference (SEC) regular season championship and the SEC Tournament title, and he was named the SEC Player of the Year by the conference's coaches and the Associated Press. In addition, The Sporting News named him a third-team All-American. With Wilbekin as the team's senior leader, the Gators advanced to the 2014 NCAA Final Four.

== Professional career ==
=== Cairns Taipans (2014–2015) ===
After going undrafted in the 2014 NBA draft, Wilbekin joined the Memphis Grizzlies for the Orlando Summer League and the Philadelphia 76ers for the Las Vegas Summer League. On August 22, 2014, he signed with the Cairns Taipans for the 2014–15 NBL season. On October 14, 2014, he was named Player of the Week for Round 1 after scoring 23 points against Adelaide on October 10 and 27 points against Melbourne on October 12. On November 6, 2014, he was named Player of the Month for October after guiding the Taipans to a 6–0 unbeaten start to the season.

On February 16, 2015, at the Taipans' annual awards night, Wilbekin was named the club Defensive Player of the Year and Most Valuable Player. He and the Taipans went on to defeat the New Zealand Breakers in the final game of the regular season on February 22 to finish on top of the ladder for the first time in club history with a win–loss record of 21–7. He was subsequently named Player of the Week for Round 20 after scoring 18 of his 25 points in the second half of the Taipans' 81–77 win over the Breakers which helped them secure the club's first ever minor premiership. After sweeping the Perth Wildcats in the semi-finals, the Taipans faced the Breakers in the Grand Final series, going on to lose the series 2–0 following a game-winning shot by Ekene Ibekwe in Game 2. Wilbekin appeared in all 32 games for the Taipans and averaged 15.2 points, 3.7 rebounds, 4.3 assists and 1.1 steals per game.

=== AEK (2015) ===
On March 12, 2015, Wilbekin signed with the Greek Basket League club AEK, for the rest of the 2014–15 Greek Basket League season. In nine games with AEK, he averaged 8.0 points, 2.3 rebounds and 3.9 assists per game.

=== Philadelphia 76ers (2015) ===
On June 30, 2015, Wilbekin joined the Orlando Magic white team for the Orlando Summer League. On July 3, 2015, he re-signed with the Taipans for the 2015–16 NBL season. Later that month however, after a stint with the Philadelphia 76ers at the Las Vegas Summer League, Wilbekin opted out of his deal with the Taipans in order to sign in the NBA. On July 24, 2015, he signed a four-year deal with the 76ers. However, he was later waived by the team on October 26 after appearing in five preseason games.

=== Darüşşafaka (2015–2018) ===
On October 31, 2015, he signed with Darüşşafaka Doğuş of Turkey for the 2015–16 season, with the option to extend for one season.

On March 28, 2017, Wilbekin signed a two-year contract extension with Darüşşafaka. In his second season with Daçka, Wilbekin helped the team to reach the 2017 EuroLeague Playoffs as the eighth seed, but they eventually were eliminated by Real Madrid in the Quarterfinals.

On January 1, 2018, Wilbekin was named EuroCup Regular Season MVP. On March 23, 2018, Wilbekin recorded a career-high 41 points by shooting 10-for-15 from three-point range – which is a EuroCup all-time records in both categories for a non-overtime game, and led Darüşşafaka to the 2018 EuroCup Finals after an 87–83 win over Bayern Munich. On April 6, 2018, Wilbekin was named Eurocup MVP and earned a spot in the All-EuroCup First Team. On April 13, 2018, Wilbekin led Darüşşafaka to win the 2018 EuroCup Championship after beating Lokomotiv Kuban in the Finals, where he averaged 26 points per game. He was subsequently named the EuroCup Finals MVP.

=== Maccabi Tel Aviv (2018–2022) ===
On July 10, 2018, Wilbekin signed a two-year deal with Israeli team Maccabi Tel Aviv of the EuroLeague. On October 18, 2018, Wilbekin scored a EuroLeague career-high 28 points, shooting 10-of-16 from the field, along with five assists and four rebounds in a 78–68 win over Budućnost. Two days later, Wilbekin was named EuroLeague Round 3 co-MVP, alongside Rodrigue Beaubois. On January 20, 2019, Wilbekin recorded a season-high 36 points, shooting 7-of-15 from 3-point range, along with four assists and three steals in a 94–104 overtime loss to Hapoel Tel Aviv. In the fourth quarter of that game, Wilbekin scored an Israeli League-record 25 points for a single quarter. On February 7, 2019, Wilbekin recorded 17 points, including a game-winner shot with 4.4 seconds left in a 65–64 win over Olympiacos.

On October 27, 2019, Wilbekin recorded 26 points, while shooting 6-of-7 from three-point range, including 13 points in 70 seconds during the third quarter, as he led Maccabi to an 89–73 win over Hapoel Jerusalem. Two days later, He was named Israeli League Round 4 MVP. On December 23, 2019, Wilbekin recorded a season-high 35 points, along with nine assists and five rebounds in a 112–110 double overtime win over Hapoel Gilboa Galil.

On January 29, 2020, Wilbekin signed a three-year contract extension with Maccabi.

=== Fenerbahçe (2022–2026) ===
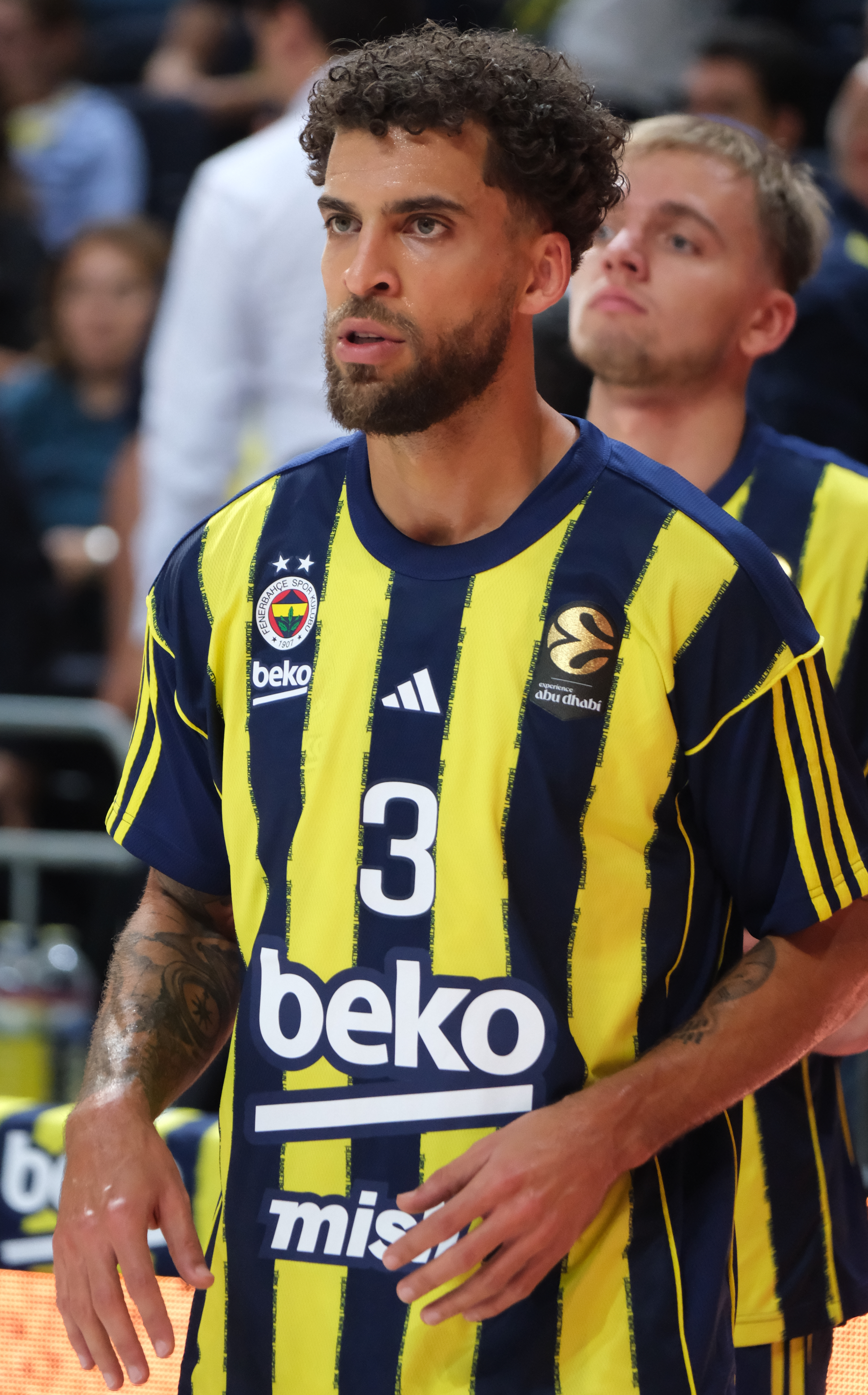
Wilbekin with the Fenerbahçe in 2025

On 26 June 2022, Wilbekin signed a three-year contract with Fenerbahçe Beko of the Turkish Basketbol Süper Ligi.

In October 2024, Wilbekin suffered a complete tear of his right anterior cruciate ligament. He was expected to miss the rest of the 2024-2025 season. He was injured during the opening game of the 2024-2025 EuroLeague regular season. Near the end of the period and just two minutes after entering the floor, he drove to the basket and made a jump-stop move, during which he got hurt.

On 12 October 2025, in his first match after a long treatment period, he played in a Basketbol Süper Ligi match sgainst Karşıyaka for 14.5 minutes and recorded 11 points and 3 assists, and helped to won 87-73.

On March 30, 2026, Fenerbahçe parted ways with Scottie Wilbekin.

=== Beşiktaş (2026–present) ===
On July 3, 2026, he signed with Beşiktaş of the Basketbol Süper Ligi (BSL).

== National team career ==
On June 18, 2018, Wilbekin got a Turkish passport. He was subsequently named a member of the senior Turkish national basketball team, for the 2019 FIBA Basketball World Cup qualification games. He made his debut with Turkey on June 28, 2018, scoring 13 points in a win over Ukraine. In 2019, Wilbekin was a member of the senior men's Turkish national basketball team for the 2019 FIBA Basketball World Cup. He played four games in the tournament, averaging 10.3 points, 6.5 assists and 2.8 rebounds, leading Turkey in assists per game. His outings including a 9 point, 13 assist game against Montenegro in the teams 77–74 classification round win. Turkey finished the tournament 22nd overall, after first round losses to United States and Czech Republic stopped them from progressing.

== Personal life ==
Wilbekin's younger brother, Mitchell, played college basketball for Wake Forest University from 2014–2018; appearing in 119 games, starting 89, over his four-year career. Scottie's other younger brother, Andrew, is currently attending Husson University in Maine.

== Career statistics ==
Legend
GP	Games played	GS	Games started	MPG	Minutes per game
FG%	Field-goal percentage	3P%	3-point field-goal percentage	FT%	Free-throw percentage
RPG	Rebounds per game	APG	Assists per game	SPG	Steals per game
BPG	Blocks per game	PPG	Points per game	PIR	Performance index rating
**Bold**	Career high

=== EuroLeague ===
*	Led the league
†	Won the league

Year	Team	GP	GS	MPG	FG%	3P%	FT%	RPG	APG	SPG	BPG	PPG	PIR
2015–16	Darüşşafaka	20	5	21.3	.377	.350	.756	1.5	2.3	1.0	**.1**	10.3	7.8
2016–17	Darüşşafaka	31	17	25.2	.430	.404	.870	1.8	3.2	1.4	.0	11.6	11.1
2018–19	Maccabi Tel Aviv	29	29	24.8	.397	.328	.800	1.8	3.1	.9	—	12.9	11.0
2019–20	Maccabi Tel Aviv	26	25	26.0	**.436**	**.435**	.813	2.0	3.4	1.2	.0	**16.1**	**15.8**
2020–21	Maccabi Tel Aviv	34	34	27.0	.390	.328	.891	**2.5**	3.9	1.1	.0	13.8	13.6
2021–22	Maccabi Tel Aviv	35	**35**	**29.0**	.419	.379	**.941***	2.1	**4.1**	**1.5**	—	15.4	15.1
2022–23	Fenerbahçe	25	23	23.6	.408	.357	.733	1.7	2.6	1.0	.0	11.1	10.1
2023–24	Fenerbahçe	**41***	18	24.7	.408	.401	.875	2.2	3.3	1.1	.0	13.0	12.5
2024–25 †	Fenerbahçe	1	1	3.0	—	—	—	—	—	—	—	.0	.0
2025–26	Fenerbahçe	6	3	14.5	.472	.440	.500	0.7	1.3	0.8	.0	7.7	5.8
Career		248	189	25.1	.410	.376	.851	2.0	3.3	1.2	.0	13.0	12.2

=== EuroCup ===
†	Denotes seasons in which Wilbekin won the EuroCup
*	Led the league

Year	Team	GP	GS	MPG	FG%	3P%	FT%	RPG	APG	SPG	BPG	PPG	PIR
2017–18†	Darüşşafaka	18	18	31.8	.451	.428	.829	2.4	4.8	1.6	0	19.7*	21.3*
Career		18	18	31.8	.451	.428	.829	2.4	4.8	1.6	0	19.7	21.3

=== Domestic leagues ===
†	Denotes seasons in which Wilbekin won the domestic league

Year	Team	League	GP	MPG	FG%	3P%	FT%	RPG	APG	SPG	BPG	PPG
2014–15	(Australia) Cairns Taipans	NBL	32	31.4	.391	.284	.835	3.7	4.3	1.1	.1	15.2
2014–15	(Greece) AEK Athens	GBL	9	27.9	.466	.370	.667	2.3	3.9	.4	—	8.0
2015–16	(Turkey) Darüşşafaka	TBSL	30	22.9	.425	.390	.874	1.7	2.7	1.0	—	12.9
2016–17	(Turkey) Darüşşafaka	TBSL	26	27.2	.431	.393	.824	2.5	4.0	1.2	.0	13.1
2017–18	(Turkey) Darüşşafaka	TBSL	27	30.1	.411	.393	.864	2.6	5.1	1.0	—	16.9
2018–19†	(Israel) Maccabi Tel Aviv	Ligat HaAl	33	23.9	.432	.383	.829	2.4	3.8	1.2	—	13.7
2019–20†	(Israel) Maccabi Tel Aviv	Ligat HaAl	27	25.3	.414	.390	.889	2.2	4.9	1.1	—	13.0
2020–21†	(Israel) Maccabi Tel Aviv	Ligat HaAl	27	25.8	.443	.420	.845	2.4	3.9	1.1	—	16.4
2021–22	(Israel) Maccabi Tel Aviv	Ligat HaAl	30	28.3	.367	.330	.867	2.5	3.8	1.1	.0	13.4
2022–23	(Turkey) Fenerbahçe	TBSL	27	24.0	.473	.473	.831	1.8	4.4	.9	.0	11.2
2023–24†	(Turkey) Fenerbahçe	TBSL	20	23.1	.486	.493	.878	1.8	4.0	.7	—	13.6
2024–25 †	(Turkey) Fenerbahçe	TBSL	0	0	—	—	—	—	—	—	—	.0
2025–26	(Turkey) Fenerbahçe	TBSL	7	14.1	.421	.379	1.000	0.7	2.1	.7	—	6.7

=== College ===
Year	Team	GP	GS	MPG	FG%	3P%	FT%	RPG	APG	SPG	BPG	PPG
2010–11	Florida	**37**	1	17.1	.348	.283	.600	1.5	1.6	1.0	.0	2.4
2011–12	Florida	**37**	1	15.2	.434	.457	.714	1.5	1.6	.6	.1	2.6
2012–13	Florida	35	29	31.9	**.453**	.359	.725	**2.9**	**5.0**	1.5	**.1**	9.1
2013–14	Florida	34	**33**	**33.8**	.402	**.390**	**.725**	2.4	3.6	**1.6**	.0	**13.1**
Career		143	65	24.2	.416	.376	.711	2.0	2.9	1.1	.1	6.6
