= Dmitry Kulagin =

Russian basketball player

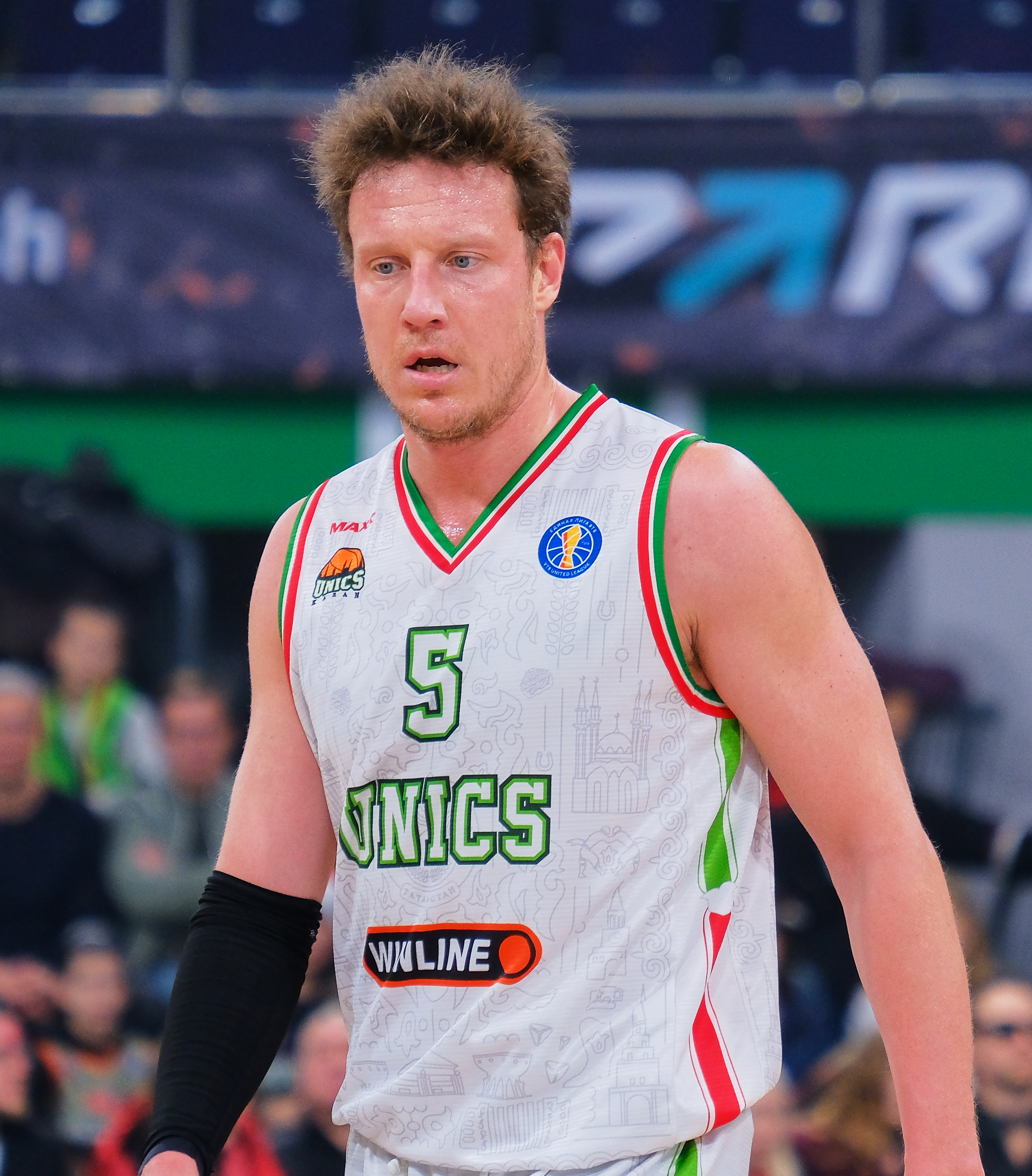
- Kulagin with UNICS Kazan in 2025

No. 8 – Zenit Saint Petersburg
- Position: Shooting guard / small forward
- League: VTB United League

Personal information
- Born: 1 July 1992 (age 34) Moscow, Russia
- Listed height: 197 cm (6 ft 6 in)
- Listed weight: 89 kg (196 lb)

Career information
- NBA draft: 2014: undrafted
- Playing career: 2009–present

Career history
- 2009–2011: Nizhny Novgorod
- 2011–2012: Triumph Lyubertsy
- 2012–2013: Krasnye Krylia Samara
- 2013–2015: Triumph Lyubertsy / Zenit St. Petersburg
- 2015–2017: CSKA Moscow
- 2017–2020: Lokomotiv Kuban
- 2021–2023: Zenit Saint Petersburg
- 2023–2026: UNICS Kazan
- 2026–present: Zenit Saint Petersburg

Career highlights
- EuroLeague champion (2016); All-EuroCup Second Team (2018); VTB United League champion (2022); VTB United League Young Player of the Year (2014)
Medals
Men's basketball
Representing Russia
U-19 World Cup
Bronze medal – third place	2011 Latvia	Team
European U-18 Championship
Silver medal – second place	2010 Lithuania	Team

Dmitry Andreyevich Kulagin (Russian: Дмитрий Андреевич Кулагин; born July 1, 1992) is a Russian professional basketball player for Zenit Saint Petersburg of the VTB United League.

== Professional career ==
Kulagin started his professional playing career in 2009. On 12 July 2011, Kulagin signed a contract with Triumph Lyubertsy.

On 9 July 2012, Kulagin signed a one-year contract with Krasnye Krylya. From 2013 to 2015 he played with Triumph Lyubertsy / Zenit St. Petersburg.

On 14 July 2015, he signed a three-year contract with CSKA Moscow. On July 26, 2017, he parted ways with CSKA.

On June 25, 2021, Kulagin officially signed with Zenit Saint Petersburg of the VTB United League, and of the EuroLeague until it was suspended due to the 2022 Russian invasion of Ukraine. He had spent the previous two seasons with PBC Lokomotiv Kuban, averaging 9.5 points and 4.6 assists in the 2020-2021 VTB United League campaign with them.

== Russian national team ==
Kulagin played with the junior national team of Russia. He played at the 2009 FIBA Europe Under-16 Championship, averaging 20.8 points per game. He also won the silver medal at the 2010 FIBA Europe Under-18 Championship, and the bronze medal at the 2011 FIBA Under-19 World Cup, where he was named to the All-Tournament Team.

== Career statistics ==
Legend
GP	Games played	GS	Games started	MPG	Minutes per game
FG%	Field-goal percentage	3P%	3-point field-goal percentage	FT%	Free-throw percentage
RPG	Rebounds per game	APG	Assists per game	SPG	Steals per game
BPG	Blocks per game	PPG	Points per game	PIR	Performance index rating
**Bold**	Career high

=== EuroLeague ===
†	Denotes seasons in which Kulagin won the EuroLeague

Year	Team	GP	GS	MPG	FG%	3P%	FT%	RPG	APG	SPG	BPG	PPG	PIR
2015–16†	CSKA Moscow	**18**	1	5.4	**.448**	.250	.000	.7	.5	.1	—	1.6	1.1
2016–17	CSKA Moscow	17	5	10.4	.373	.300	**.800**	**1.5**	1.2	.3	.1	3.9	2.7
2021–22	Zenit	17	**7**	**19.1**	.407	**.425**	.467	**1.5**	**2.4**	**.6**	**.3**	**5.5**	**4.5**
Career		52	13	11.5	.401	.354	.577	1.3	1.3	.3	.1	3.7	2.7

== Personal life ==
His younger brother, Mikhail Kulagin, is also a professional basketball player.
