= Chipita =

Greek snack food company

Chipita S.A.
- Native name: Τσιπικάο
- Type: S.A.
- Industry: Food
- Genre: Snacks
- Founded: 1973; 53 years ago
- Founder: Constandinos Tsaltas
- Headquarters: Athens, Greece
- Area served: Worldwide
- Key people: Spyros Theodoropoulos (CEO)
- Products: 7DAYS, Fineti, Chipicao and others
- Brands: Chipicao
- Revenue: 546,8 million € (2020)
- Parent: Mondelēz International (2021–present)
- Website: chipita.com

Chipita S.A. is a Greek food company headquartered in Athens, Greece. As of 2016, it is stationed within 56 countries.

== History ==
Chipita is a Greek snack food company established in 1973. In 1991, Chipita introduced one of its flagship products, the 7DAYS croissant—an individually packaged baked snack with long shelf life. Currently, Chipita products are manufactured in plants located in 11 countries and marketed to consumers in a total of 56 countries, either directly or through strategic partnerships.

The Group has 13 privately owned plants in the Netherlands, Greece, Germany, Bulgaria, Austria, Belgium, the United Kingdom, Poland, Russia, Romania, Turkey, Slovakia and Switzerland (2024). Additionally, six more plants operate through strategic partnerships in Saudi Arabia, Mexico, Malaysia and India. Since this period, Chipita has also set up commercial offices in 15 countries: the Netherlands, Austria, the Czech Republic, Germany, Hungary, Switzerland, Serbia, Slovakia, Croatia, the Baltics, Georgia, Ukraine, Belarus, Belgium and the United Kingdom. Chipita's goods, produced in 16 manufacturing plants in 11 countries, are delivered to consumers in a total of 56 countries, either directly or indirectly through strategic partnerships.

Chipita employs more than 5,800 people from over 30 nationalities. Approximately 4,700 of them are employed directly by Chipita and the rest through strategic partner companies.

In May 2021, Mondelēz International acquired Chipita for €2 billion. The transaction was completed on January 3, 2022.

Despite the ongoing war following the Russian invasion of Ukraine, Chipita has chosen to maintain its operations in Russia. This decision has drawn criticism, particularly as many other companies have suspended their activities in response to the situation.

== Products ==
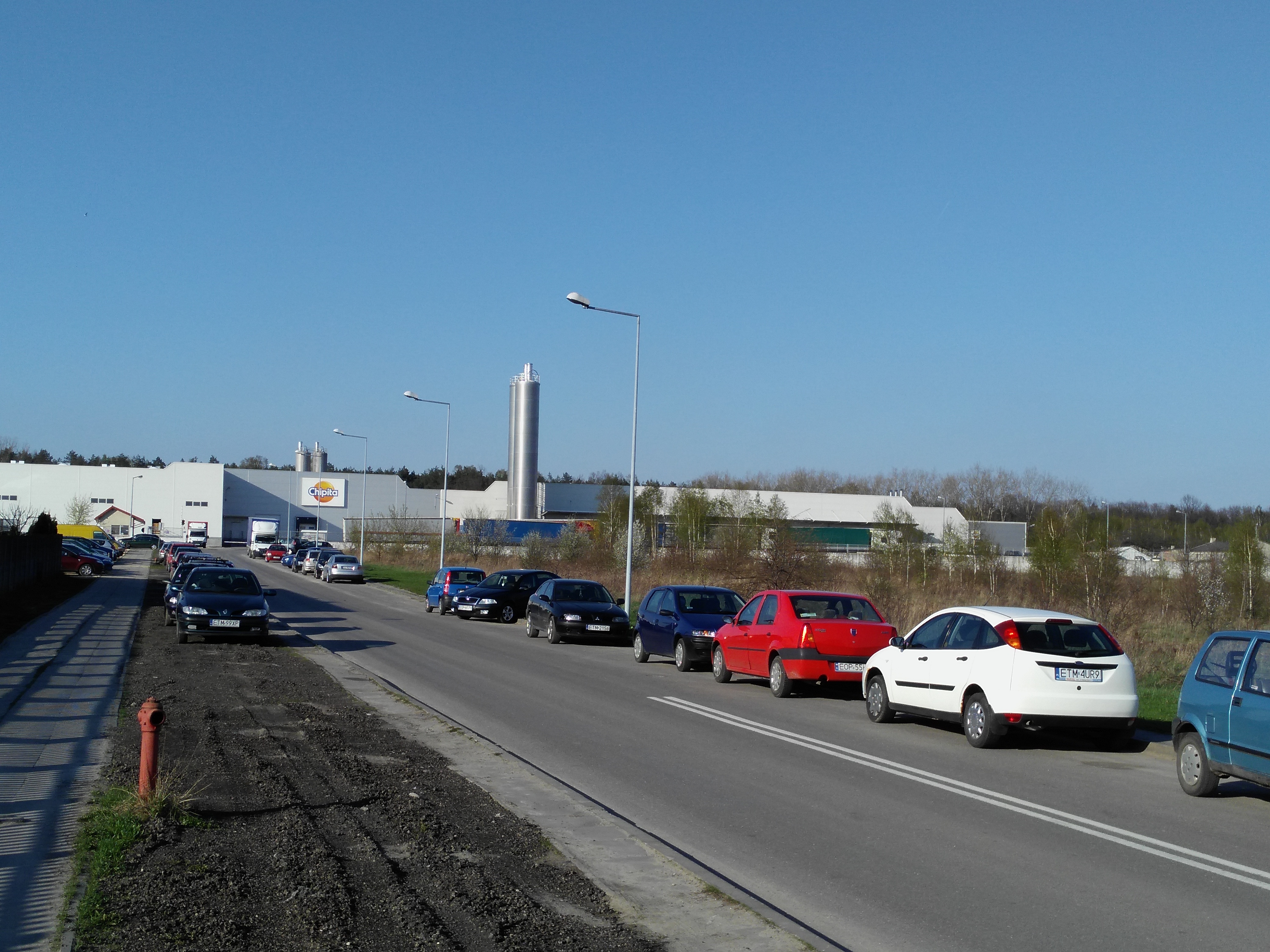
Chipita factory in Tomaszów Mazowiecki, Poland

=== International brands ===
7DAYS: A range of sweet and savory flour-based products

Products: Sweet: 7DAYS Single Serve Croissant, 7DAYS mini croissants, 7DAYS Cakes, 7DAYS Biscuits Savory: Bake Rolls, Mini Bake Rolls, Fruit & Nuts, Pizzeti

Fineti: Chipita's confectionery line

Products: Fineti Chocolates, Fineti Dips & Sticks, Fineti Wafer Sticks, Fineti Spread

Chipicao: Geared towards children, Chipicao is a sweet snack brand that includes an additional item, such as a sticker or toy

Products: Chipicao single serve croissants, Chipicao mini croissants, Chipicao Biscuits, Chipicao Cakes

Local Greek brands

- Molto Croissants
- SpinSpan Jam
- Chipita and Tsipers potato chips
- Extra extruded snacks: Extra Cheesy Curls, Extra Spicy Stars, Extra with Peanut

=== Joint venture partnerships ===
Chipita S.A. has formed the following joint venture partnerships:

==== Mexico ====
Established in 2017, CCP is a Joint Venture between Chipita, Catamo and Mr. Alberto Romo of Proan. CCP handles marketing, sales and distribution of mini croissants designed for kids under the brand Vuala.

==== India ====
Britchip Foods Limited was set up in 2017 in India as a joint venture partnership between Chipita and Britannia Industries. Britchip office is based in Bengaluru while its manufacturing plant is located in Pune. The share capital of Britchip Foods is made up of 40% of ST Bakery, Chipita Foods' successor that supports croissant production by offering development and know-how, and 60% of Britannia Industries. During the first months of 2019 it introduced croissant of cocoa and vanilla flavors in India under the brand name Treat.

==== Saudi Arabia ====
Modern Food Industries (MFI) was set up in 2009 in Saudi Arabia as a joint venture between Chipita, Almarai and The Olayan Group. Based in Riyadh, it has manufacturing plants in Jeddah, Al-Kharj and Ha'il. In 2009 it introduced the 7DAYS croissant in Saudi Arabia. Subsequently, also entered the cakes market with its 7DAYS Swiss Rolls and 7DAYS Cake Bars, while in 2018 it launched 7Days Bake Rolls in the market. Modern Food Industries is also present in the United Arab Emirates, Kuwait, Oman, Bahrain.

==== Malaysia ====
Established in 2016, Muchico Bakery SDN BHD is a joint venture in Malaysia between Chipita and the Tan Family. Muchico Bakery commenced local manufacturing of the products and introduced the 7DAYS croissant as of 2017 in the market of Malaysia and as of 2018 in Singapore.
