= Volkswagen Arena (Istanbul) =

Multi-purpose indoor arena

- VW Arena İstanbul
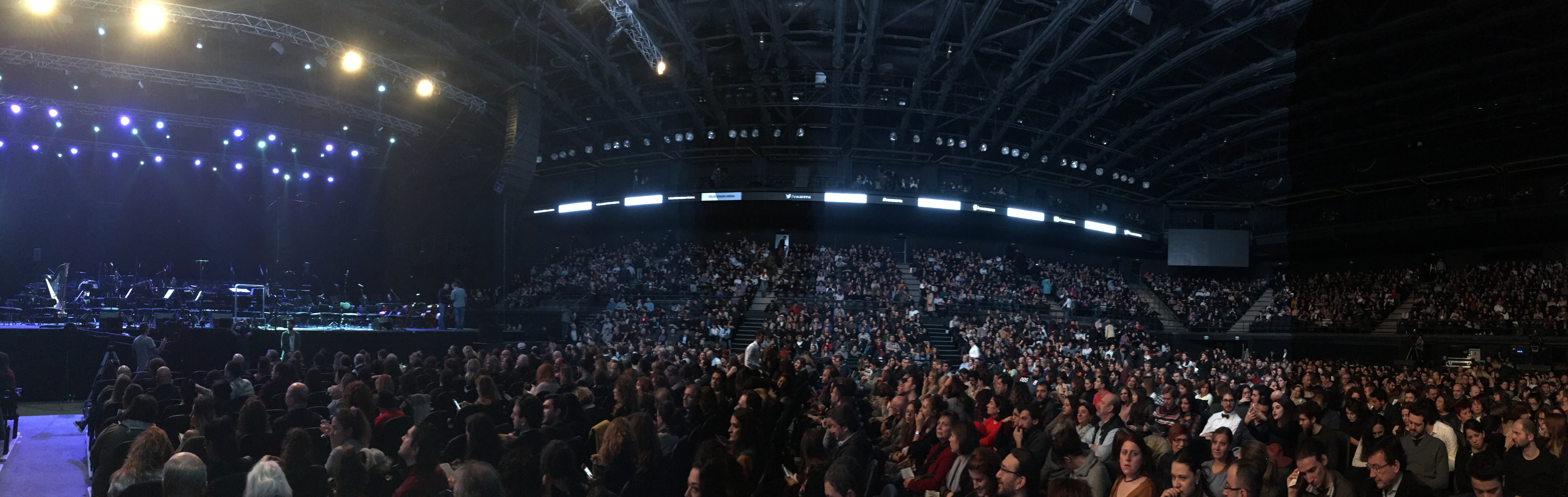
- Volkswagen Arena before Fazıl Say's Nazım Oratorio performance, 25 December 2016
- Interactive map of Volkswagen Arena
- Former names: Black Box Arena Istanbul
- Location: Sarıyer, Istanbul, Turkey
- Coordinates: 41.109018°N 29.007814°E
- Capacity: Concerts: 4,500-5,800; Basketball: 5,240 (5,000 seats, 240 lounges)
- Acreage: 12,000 m^{2} (130,000 ft^{2})

Construction
- Opened: June 2014
- Renovated: November 2015

Tenant
- Darüşşafaka (2015–present)

Website
- www.vwarena.com/en

Volkswagen Arena is a multi-purpose indoor arena that is located in Istanbul, Turkey. The arena is a part of the UNIQ Istanbul cultural complex that is located in Maslak, Istanbul, and which also includes offices, a 1,200 seat multi-use hall, and places to tour, such as food courts, historic mansions, exhibition spots, and shopping spaces.

The arena can be used to host live events, such as concerts, fashion shows, award ceremonies, dance and theater shows, basketball games, and other sporting events. The capacity of the arena ranges from 4,500 to 5,800, depending on different configurations for different events, and a combination of seating, standing, and VIP box configurations. The arena's capacity for basketball games is 5,240, which includes 5,000 regular seats for fans (88 of which are VIP seats), and 240 available seats in the arena's 24 private lounge suites.

The arena has accommodations for 1,200 parking spaces, and also has 24 private lounge suites and 88 VIP boxes.

== History ==
Volkswagen Arena opened in the year 2014. In November 2015, the arena was officially inaugurated as the home arena of the Turkish Basketball Super League club Darüşşafaka, for Basketball Champions League home games.

== See also ==
- List of indoor arenas in Turkey
