= Trevor Lacey =

American basketball player (born 1991)

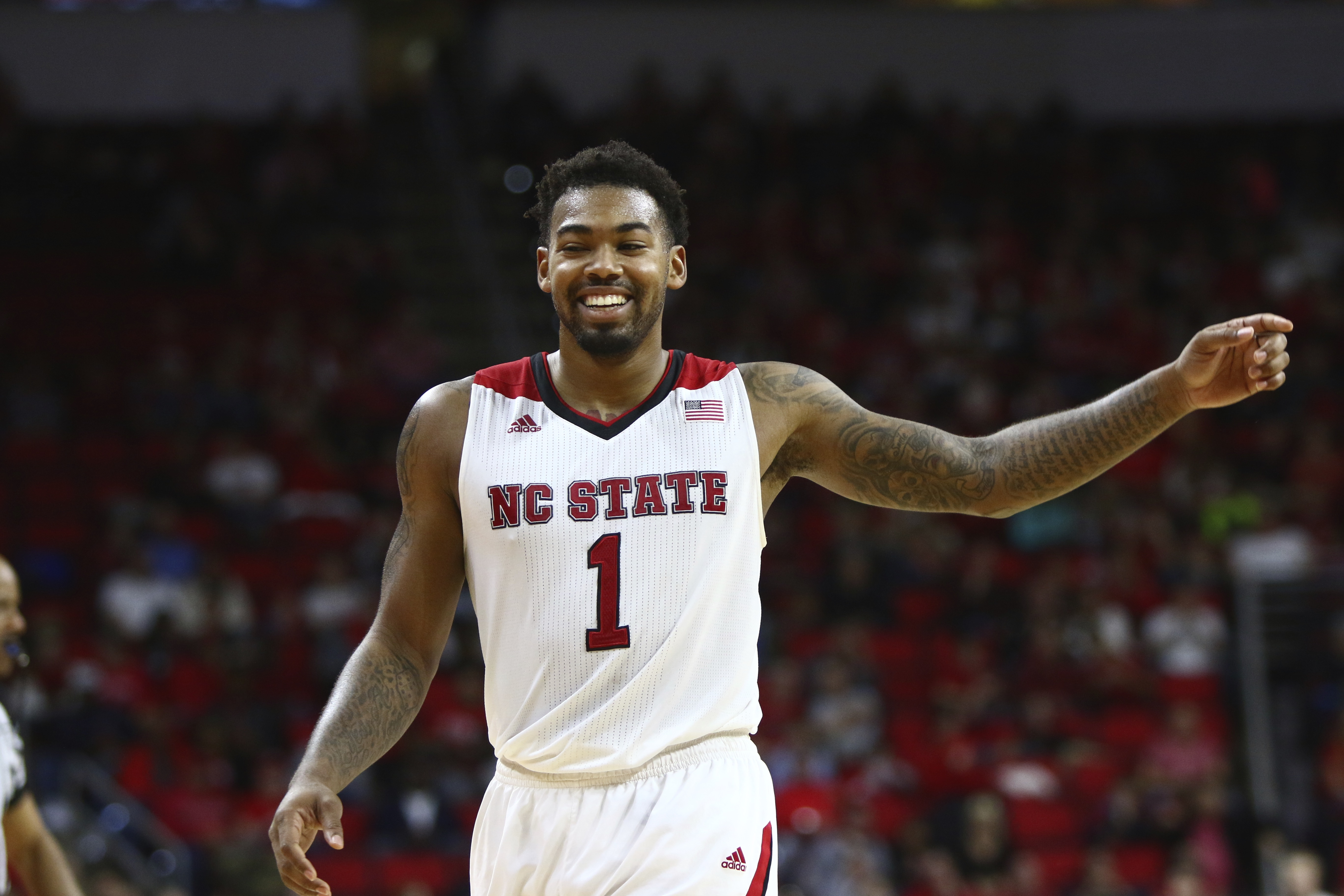
- Lacey with NC State in 2015

Free agent
- Position: Shooting guard

Personal information
- Born: October 13, 1991 (age 35)
- Listed height: 6 ft 3 in (1.91 m)
- Listed weight: 207 lb (94 kg)

Career information
- High school: Butler (Huntsville, Alabama)
- College: Alabama (2011–2013); NC State (2014–2015)
- NBA draft: 2015: undrafted
- Playing career: 2015–present

Career history
- 2015–2016: Consultinvest Pesaro
- 2016–2017: Dinamo Sassari
- 2017–2019: Lokomotiv Kuban
- 2019–2020: Wisconsin Herd
- 2021: Rostock Seawolves
- 2021–2022: APU Udine
- 2022–2025: Vanoli Cremona
- 2026: Maccabi Ironi Ramat Gan

Career highlights
- Russian Cup champion (2018); Second-team All-ACC – Media (2015); Third-team All-ACC – Coaches (2015); First-team Parade All-American (2011); 2× Alabama Mr. Basketball (2010, 2011)
- Stats at Basketball Reference

Trevor Lacey (born October 13, 1991) is an American professional basketball player who last played for Maccabi Ironi Ramat Gan of the Israeli Basketball Premier League. He played college basketball for Alabama and North Carolina State.

== High school career ==
Lacey played at Butler High School in Huntsville, Alabama, where he helped the Rebels to Class 5A titles in 2008 and 2009, earning three consecutive Class first-team selections, including a Player of the Year selection in 2010. He added the Class 4A championship in 2011 and added Class Player of the Year and first team selections again after averaging almost 32 points a game. After first receiving the award in 2010, Lacey was named Alabama Mr. Basketball in 2011, becoming only the second player to win it twice.

== College career ==
The Alabama native played collegiately for Alabama of the Southeastern Conference in the NCAA Division I from 2011 to 2013.

He transferred to NC State of the Atlantic Coast Conference (ACC) in 2013, sitting out the 2013–14 season. His junior season was his only one with the Wolfpack, averaging 15.7 points, 4.6 rebounds and 3.5 assists as the side reached the NCAA Tournament Sweet 16. He received Second Team All-ACC honours at the end of the season.

== Professional career ==
Lacey declared for the 2015 NBA draft prior to his senior season, forgoing his final year of eligibility. He would go undrafted, later playing with the Cleveland Cavaliers in the Las Vegas Summer League during July 2015.

The same month, Lacey joined Italian Serie A side Consultinvest Pesaro.

On June 24, 2016, Lacey signed with Dinamo Sassari for the 2016–17 season.

On July 10, 2017, Lacey signed a two-year contract with Russian club Lokomotiv Kuban.

For the 2019–20 season, Lacey joined the Wisconsin Herd of the NBA G League. On March 7, 2020, he posted 16 points, three rebounds, one assist and one steal in a 136–122 win over the Capital City Go-Go. Lacey averaged 4.7 points, 2.1 rebounds and 1.4 assists per game in 36 games for the Wisconsin Herd.

In February 2021, Lacey was signed by German second-division side Rostock Seawolves, coached by Dirk Bauermann. Lacey made 16 appearances for the Rostock team in 2020–21, averaging 14.8 points, 4.7 assists and 4.4 rebounds per contest. He signed with APU Udine of the Serie A2 on July 6, 2021.

== Career statistics ==
Legend
GP	Games played	GS	Games started	MPG	Minutes per game
FG%	Field goal percentage	3P%	3-point field goal percentage	FT%	Free throw percentage
RPG	Rebounds per game	APG	Assists per game	SPG	Steals per game
BPG	Blocks per game	PPG	Points per game	**Bold**	Career high

=== College ===
Year	Team	GP	GS	MPG	FG%	3P%	FT%	RPG	APG	SPG	BPG	PPG
2011–12	Alabama	33	16	24.7	.414	.301	**.797**	3.0	1.8	.8	.1	7.3
2012–13	Alabama	**36**	**35**	31.3	.392	.373	.718	3.8	3.2	**1.4**	**.4**	11.3
2013–14	NC State	Transfer										
2014–15	NC State	35	**35**	**35.9**	**.436**	**.392**	.738	**4.6**	**3.5**	.9	.2	**15.7**
Career		104	86	30.8	.416	.365	.744	3.8	2.8	1.1	.2	11.5
