= 2016–17 Saski Baskonia season =

Basketball season

Baskonia
2016–17 season
- Chairman: José Antonio Querejeta
- Head coach: Sito Alonso
- Arena: Fernando Buesa Arena
- Liga ACB: 2nd place
- Playoffs: Semifinalist
- EuroLeague: 7th place Quarterfinalist
- Copa del Rey: Semifinalist
- Supercopa de España: Semifinalists
Home	Away	Euroleague

The 2016–17 season was Baskonia's 57th in existence and the club's 34th consecutive season in the top flight of Spanish basketball and the 17th consecutive season in the top flight of European basketball. Baskonia was involved in four competitions.

== Players ==
=== Squad information ===
Baskonia roster
Players
Coaches

Pos.	No.	Nat.	Name	Ht.	Wt.	Age
G	10	(France)	Beaubois, Rodrigue	1.88 m (6 ft 2 in)	84 kg (185 lb)	38 – 24 February 1988
G/F	11	(Slovenia)	Blažič, Jaka	1.96 m (6 ft 5 in)	96 kg (212 lb)	36 – 30 June 1990
SF	34	(United States)	Budinger, Chase (injured)	2.01 m (6 ft 7 in)	98 kg (216 lb)	38 – 22 May 1988
C	12	(Spain)	Diop, Ilimane	2.11 m (6 ft 11 in)	104 kg (229 lb)	31 – 4 April 1995
G/F	8	(Hungary)	Hanga, Ádám (C)	2.01 m (6 ft 7 in)	93 kg (205 lb)	37 – 12 April 1989
PG	15	(Argentina)	Laprovíttola, Nicolás	1.93 m (6 ft 4 in)	82 kg (181 lb)	36 – 31 January 1990
PG	0	(United States)	Larkin, Shane	1.80 m (5 ft 11 in)	79 kg (174 lb)	33 – 2 October 1992
SG	1	(United States)	Ledo, Ricky	2.01 m (6 ft 7 in)	88 kg (194 lb)	33 – 10 September 1992
PG	55	(Brazil)	Luz, Rafa (injured)	1.88 m (6 ft 2 in)	94 kg (207 lb)	34 – 11 February 1992
G/F	9	(Lithuania)	Sedekerskis, Tadas	2.04 m (6 ft 8 in)	96 kg (212 lb)	28 – 17 January 1998
F	23	(Georgia (country))	Shengelia, Tornike	2.06 m (6 ft 9 in)	109 kg (240 lb)	34 – 5 October 1991
F/C	14	(France)	Tillie, Kim	2.11 m (6 ft 11 in)	105 kg (231 lb)	38 – 15 July 1988
C	7	(Germany)	Voigtmann, Johannes	2.11 m (6 ft 11 in)	115 kg (254 lb)	33 – 30 September 1992

Head coach

- (Spain) Sito Alonso

Assistant coach(es)

- (Spain) Óscar Lata
- (Spain) David Gil

Legend

- (C) Team captain
- Injured

- Roster
Updated: May 14, 2017

=== Players in ===
No.	Pos.	Nat.	Name	Age	Moving from		Type	Ends	Transfer fee	Date	Source
	PF	(Brazil)	Daniel Bordignon	20	Peñas Huesca	(Spain)	Loan return	Undisclosed	Free	14 June 2016	
9	SG	(Lithuania)	Tadas Sedekerskis	18	Peñas Huesca	(Spain)	Loan return	2019	Free	14 June 2016	
7	C	(Germany)	Johannes Voigtmann	23	Fraport Skyliners	(Germany)	End of contract	2019	Free	23 June 2016	
55	PG	(Brazil)	Rafa Luz	24	Flamengo	(Brazil)	End of contract	2018	Free	15 July 2016	
10	G	(France)	Rodrigue Beaubois	28	Strasbourg	(France)	End of contract	2018	Free	22 July 2016	
1	F/C	(Italy)	Andrea Bargnani	30	Brooklyn Nets	(United States)	End of contract	2018	Free	27 July 2016	
0	PG	(United States)	Shane Larkin	23	Brooklyn Nets	(United States)	End of contract	2017	Free	10 August 2016	
	PG	(Argentina)	Luca Vildoza	21	Quilmes	(Argentina)	Transfer	2020	Undisclosed	16 August 2016	
5	SF	(United States)	Trevor Cooney	21	Syracuse Orange	(United States)	End of NCAA eligibility	November 2016	Free	20 September 2016	
2	PG	(Nigeria)	Josh Akognon	30	Dinamo Sassari	(Italy)	End of contract	November 2016	Free	2 October 2016	
34	SF	(United States)	Chase Budinger	28	Phoenix Suns	(United States)	End of contract	2017	Free	27 October 2016	
5	PG	(Argentina)	Pablo Prigioni	39	Houston Rockets	(United States)	End of contract	2017	Free	6 December 2016	
15	PG	(Argentina)	Nicolás Laprovíttola	26	San Antonio Spurs	(United States)	End of contract	2017	Free	18 January 2017	

Total spending: ▼€0

=== Players out ===
No.	Pos.	Nat.	Name	Age	Moving to		Type	Transfer fee	Date	Source
1	SG	(United States)	Michael Roll	29	Beşiktaş Sompo Japan	(Turkey)	End of contract	Free	14 June 2016	
4	F	(Spain)	Mamadou Diop	23	Melco Ieper	(Belgium)	End of contract	Free	28 June 2016	
3	PG	(United States)	Mike James	25	Panathinaikos	(Greece)	End of contract	Free	4 July 2016	
33	SG	(Spain)	Alberto Corbacho	31	Rio Natura Monbus Obradoiro	(Spain)	Contract terminated	Undisclosed	4 July 2016	
9	C	(Greece)	Ioannis Bourousis	32	Panathinaikos	(Greece)	End of contract	Free	12 July 2016	
6	C	(Croatia)	Darko Planinić	25	Herbalife Gran Canaria	(Spain)	Contract terminated	Undisclosed	13 July 2016	
42	SF	(Latvia)	Dāvis Bertāns	23	San Antonio Spurs	(United States)	Contract terminated	€590,000	14 July 2016	
20	PG	(United States)	Darius Adams	27	Xinjiang Flying Tigers	(China)	End of contract	Free	29 July 2016	
5	G	(France)	Fabien Causeur	29	Brose Bamberg	(Germany)	End of contract	Free	2 August 2016	
	PG	(Argentina)	Luca Vildoza	21	Quilmes	(Argentina)	Loan	Free	16 August 2016	
2	PG	(Nigeria)	Josh Akognon	30	Lietuvos rytas	(Lithuania)	Contract terminated	Undisclosed	6 November 2016	
5	SF	(United States)	Trevor Cooney	21	Rasta Vechta	(Germany)	Contract terminated	Undisclosed	10 November 2016	
5	PG	(Argentina)	Pablo Prigioni	39			Retirement	Free	9 January 2017	
	PF	(Brazil)	Daniel Bordignon	20	Bahía Basket	(Argentina)	Loan	Free	14 June 2016	

Total income: ▲€590,000

Total expenditure: ▲€590,000

== Club ==
=== Technical staff ===
Position	Staff
Head coach	Sito Alonso
Assistant coaches	Óscar Lata; David Gil
Doctor	Marcelo Bronzini
Physical conditioning coach	Luka Svilar
Team Manager	Carlos Toquero
Physiotherapists	Isaac Alonso; Asier Ugarte
Equipment manager	Santiago Matilla

Source: Saski Baskonia

=== Kit ===
Supplier: Hummel / Sponsor: Laboral Kutxa

Home	Away	Euroleague

== Pre-season and friendlies ==
Win Loss

4 September 2016 1	Unicaja (Spain)	63–79	(Spain) Baskonia	Vilagarcía de Arousa, Spain
17:30 (CEST)	Scoring by quarter: 20–22, 9–25, 15–16, 19–16
	Pts: Lafayette, Smith 11; Rebs: Díez 6 Asts: Díaz 3 PIR: Suárez 10	Boxscore	Pts: Beaubois 24; Rebs: Tillie 7 Asts: Larkin 4 PIR: Beaubois 26	Arena: Fontecarmoa; Attendance: 750; Referees: Pérez Pérez, Rial, Cortés

5 September 2016 2	Baskonia (Spain)	70–73	(Spain) UCAM Murcia	Vilagarcía de Arousa, Spain
20:30 (CEST)	Scoring by quarter: 21–20, 17–17, 12–20, 20–16
	Pts: Soko 14; Rebs: Soko 10; Asts: Campazzo 4 PIR: Soko 22	Boxscore	Pts: Cooney 16; Rebs: Lee 6 Asts: Larkin 3 PIR: Cooney 15	Arena: Fontecarmoa; Attendance: 750; Referees: Pérez Pérez, Cortés, Rial

10 September 2016 3	Baskonia (Spain)	76–72	(Spain) Iberostar Tenerife	Lleida, Spain
20:30 (CEST)	Scoring by quarter: 16–15, 13–20, 24–19, 23–18
	Pts: Beaubois 23; Rebs: Delaš 8 Asts: Luz 4 PIR: Beaubois 21	Boxscore	Pts: Richotti 19; Rebs: Hanley 6 Asts: Richotti, White 4 PIR: Richotti 17	Arena: Pavelló Barris Nord; Referees: Manuel, Munar, Caballero

11 September 2016 4	Baskonia (Spain)	68–82	(Spain) UCAM Murcia	Lleida, Spain
19:30 (CEST)	Scoring by quarter: 14–13, 27–20, 15–21, 12–28
	Pts: Delaš 21; Rebs: Delaš, Sedekerskis 10; Asts: Luz 7 PIR: Delaš 24	Boxscore	Pts: Benite 17; Rebs: Rojas 13; Asts: Campazzo 4 PIR: Radović 16	Arena: Pavelló Barris Nord; Referees: García González, Sánchez Mohedas, Sacristán

19 September 2016 5	San Pablo Inmobiliaria Burgos (Spain)	73–68	(Spain) Baskonia	Burgos, Spain
20:30 (CEST)	Scoring by quarter: 15–15, 19–20, 10–18, 29–15
	Pts: Barrera, Martínez 13; Rebs: Vega 7 Asts: Huskic, López 3 PIR: Vega 13	Boxscore	Pts: Cooney 17; Rebs: Diop, Tillie 7 Asts: Luz 5 PIR: Tillie 16	Arena: Coliseum Burgos; Attendance: 1,000; Referees: Bultó, Martínez, Martínez

28 September 2016 6	Baskonia (Spain)	96–81	(Venezuela) Guaros de Lara	Vitoria-Gasteiz, Spain
20:30 (CEST)	Scoring by quarter: 19–20, 26–20, 23–18, 28–23
	Pts: Larkin 18	Boxscore	Pts: Graham 19	Arena: Fernando Buesa Arena; Attendance: 5,114; Referees: García, Manuel, Sacristán

== Competitions ==
=== Overall ===
Competition	Started round	Current position / round	Final position / round	First match	Last match
Liga ACB	Matchday 1	5th	–	1 October 2016	14 May 2017
EuroLeague	Matchday 1	6th	–	14 October 2016	6 April 2017
Copa del Rey	Quarterfinals	—	–	–	–
Supercopa de España	Semifinals	—	Semifinalists	23 September 2016	

Updated to match played January 29, 2017
Source: Competitions

=== Overview ===
Competition	Record							
Competition	Pld	W	D	L	PF	PA	PD	Win %
Liga ACB	18	12	0	6	1,525	1,392	+133	66.67
EuroLeague	20	12	0	8	1,619	1,583	+36	60.00
Copa del Rey	0	0	0	0	0	0	+0	—
Supercopa de España	1	0	0	1	80	84	−4	0.00
Total	39	24	0	15	3,224	3,059	+165	61.54

Last updated: January 29, 2017
Source: Competitions

=== Supercopa de España ===
Win Loss

23 September 2016 Semifinals	Baskonia	80–84	Herbalife Gran Canaria	Vitoria-Gasteiz
19:00 (CEST)	Scoring by quarter: 13–17, 12–15, 28–21, 27–30
	Pts: Shengelia 16; Rebs: Tillie 6 Asts: Luz 7 PIR: Hanga 16	Boxscore	Pts: Kuric 24; Rebs: Planinić 8 Asts: Oliver 5 PIR: Kuric 22	Arena: Fernando Buesa Arena; Attendance: 9,257; Referees: Martín Bertrán, Conde, Castillo

=== Liga ACB ===
==== League table ====
Pos	Team	Pld	W	L	PF	PA	PD	Qualification or relegation
1	Real Madrid	32	25	7	2803	2500	+303	Qualification to playoffs
2	Baskonia	32	23	9	2697	2445	+252	Qualification to playoffs
3	Valencia Basket	32	23	9	2639	2398	+241	Qualification to playoffs
4	Unicaja	32	22	10	2661	2495	+166	Qualification to playoffs
5	Iberostar Tenerife	32	22	10	2466	2277	+189	Qualification to playoffs

Source: ACB

==== Results summary ====
Overall						Home					Away				
Pld	W	L	PF	PA	PD	W	L	PF	PA	PD	W	L	PF	PA	PD
18	12	6	1525	1392	+133	7	2	764	680	+84	5	4	761	712	+49

Last updated: January 29, 2017.
Source: Competitive matches

==== Results by round ====
Round	1	2	3	4	5	6	7	8	9	10	11	12	13	14	15	16	17	18	19	20	21	22	23	24	25	26	27	28	29	30	31	32	33	34
Ground	A	H	A	H	A	A	H	A	H	H	A	H	R	A	H	A	H	A	H	A	H	A	H											
Result	W	W	L	W	W	L	W	L	W	L	W	W	R	L	W	W	W	W	L															
Position	1	2	6	4	3	5	4	6	5	8	6	5	5	5	5	5	5	4	5															

Last updated: January 29, 2017.
Source: Competitive matches
Ground: A = Away; H = Home; R = Rest. Result: L = Loss; W = Win; R = Rest; P = Postponed.

==== Matches ====
Win Loss

1 October 2016 1	Rio Natura Monbus Obradoiro	76–92	Baskonia	Santiago de Compostela
20:00 (CEST)	Scoring by quarter: 20–30, 19–22, 14–24, 23–16
	Pts: Yusta 18; Rebs: Whittington 8 Asts: McConnell 5 PIR: Allen 18	Boxscore	Pts: Larkin, Shengelia 19; Rebs: Hanga 7 Asts: Larkin 8 PIR: Larkin 24	Arena: Multiusos Fontes do Sar; Attendance: 5,439; Referees: Peruga, Araña, Serrano

7 October 2016 2	Baskonia	87–75	UCAM Murcia	Vitoria-Gasteiz
20:00 (CEST)	Scoring by quarter: 10–23, 12–14, 33–14, 32–24
	Pts: Bargnani 20; Rebs: Hanga 8 Asts: Hanga, Larkin 4 PIR: Hanga 23	Boxscore	Pts: Baron 15; Rebs: Faverani 12; Asts: Campazzo 9 PIR: Campazzo, Faverani 16	Arena: Fernando Buesa Arena; Attendance: 9,054; Referees: Pérez Pizarro, Sánchez Mohedas, Caballero

9 October 2016 3	FC Barcelona Lassa	98–92(OT)	Baskonia	Barcelona
17:00 (CEST)	Scoring by quarter: 23–20, 30–27, 17–20, 14–17, Overtime: 14–8
	Pts: Doellman 24; Rebs: Dorsey 8 Asts: Rice 4 PIR: Doellman 21	Boxscore	Pts: Bargnani 18; Rebs: Hanga 10; Asts: Larkin 8 PIR: Hanga 19	Arena: Palau Blaugrana; Attendance: 5,042; Referees: Jiménez Trujillo, Bultó, Rial

16 October 2016 4	Baskonia	95–77	MoraBanc Andorra	Vitoria-Gasteiz
20:00 (CEST)	Scoring by quarter: 28–25, 20–19, 36–21, 11–12
	Pts: Akognon 20; Rebs: Shengelia 8 Asts: Shengelia 5 PIR: Shengelia 27	Boxscore	Pts: Shermadini 15; Rebs: Burjanadze, Shermadini 4 Asts: Schreiner 5 PIR: Shermadini 19	Arena: Fernando Buesa Arena; Attendance: 7,850; Referees: Cortés, Oyón, Pérez Niz

23 October 2016 5	Divina Seguros Joventut	83–90	Baskonia	Badalona
12:30 (CEST)	Scoring by quarter: 17–20, 23–20, 24–27, 19–23
	Pts: Abalde 15; Rebs: Stutz 13; Asts: Ventura 5 PIR: Ventura 21	Boxscore	Pts: Hanga 16; Rebs: Blažič, Voigtmann 7 Asts: Larkin 10; PIR: Voigtmann 27	Arena: Palau Municipal d'Esports; Attendance: 3,799; Referees: Hierrezuelo, Castillo, Cardús

30 October 2016 6	Unicaja	82–72	Baskonia	Málaga
18:30 (CET)	Scoring by quarter: 22–14, 17–9, 19–27, 24–22
	Pts: Fogg 19; Rebs: Musli 6 Asts: Lafayette 10; PIR: Fogg 22	Boxscore	Pts: Blažič 16; Rebs: Voigtmann 10; Asts: Larkin 4 PIR: Blažič 18	Arena: Martín Carpena; Attendance: 7,461; Referees: Pérez Pérez, Manuel, Aliaga

6 November 2016 7	Baskonia	82–69	ICL Manresa	Vitoria-Gasteiz
12:30 (CET)	Scoring by quarter: 22–15, 22–16, 14–22, 24–16
	Pts: Blažič 17; Rebs: Voigtmann 7 Asts: Luz 6 PIR: Shengelia 22	Boxscore	Pts: Suggs 17; Rebs: Trapani 9 Asts: three players 2 PIR: Cvetković 15	Arena: Fernando Buesa Arena; Attendance: 9,145; Referees: Perea, García Ortiz, Serrano

13 November 2016 8	Valencia Basket	99–91	Baskonia	Valencia
18:30 (CET)	Scoring by quarter: 17–16, 24–16, 27–26, 31–33
	Pts: Diot 28; Rebs: San Emeterio 9 Asts: Diot 6 PIR: Diot 26	Boxscore	Pts: Larkin 26; Rebs: Voigtmann 7 Asts: Larkin 8 PIR: Larkin 30	Arena: Fuente de San Luis; Attendance: 8,500; Referees: García González, Calatrava, Fernández

20 November 2016 9	Baskonia	101–92(OT)	Tecnyconta Zaragoza	Vitoria-Gasteiz
18:00 (CET)	Scoring by quarter: 18–25, 27–17, 17–25, 25–20, Overtime: 14–5
	Pts: Beaubois 22; Rebs: Bargnani, Voigtmann 8 Asts: Larkin 9 PIR: Larkin 24	Boxscore	Pts: Jelovac 30; Rebs: Fotu 9 Asts: Bellas 6 PIR: Jelovac 36	Arena: Fernando Buesa Arena; Attendance: 9,134; Referees: Conde, Martínez, Martínez Díez

27 November 2016 10	Baskonia	72–73	Iberostar Tenerife	Vitoria-Gasteiz
12:30 (CET)	Scoring by quarter: 15–18, 15–14, 25–24, 17–17
	Pts: Larkin 23; Rebs: Shengelia 6 Asts: Hanga, Larkin 3 PIR: Larkin 23	Boxscore	Pts: White 17; Rebs: Beirán 9 Asts: Richotti, White 4 PIR: Beirán 17	Arena: Fernando Buesa Arena; Attendance: 8,623; Referees: Martín Bertrán, Bultó, Munar

4 December 2016 11	Real Betis Energía Plus	60–94	Baskonia	Sevilla
12:30 (CET)	Scoring by quarter: 12–29, 13–18, 16–27, 19–20
	Pts: Radičević 13; Rebs: Triguero 6 Asts: Nachbar 3 PIR: Stojanovski 12	Boxscore	Pts: Tillie 15; Rebs: Larkin 7 Asts: Luz 4 PIR: Shengelia 20	Arena: San Pablo; Attendance: 3,809; Referees: Jiménez Trujillo, Araña, Rial

11 December 2016 12	Baskonia	82–77	Movistar Estudiantes	Vitoria-Gasteiz
18:00 (CET)	Scoring by quarter: 24–13, 19–22, 12–23, 27–19
	Pts: Beaubois 31; Rebs: Shengelia 8 Asts: Larkin 6 PIR: Beaubois 26	Boxscore	Pts: Jackson 26; Rebs: Arteaga, Suton 5 Asts: Jackson 6 PIR: Jackson 27	Arena: Fernando Buesa Arena; Attendance: 8,759; Referees: García González, Oyón, Cardús

27 December 2016 14	Herbalife Gran Canaria	74–61	Baskonia	Las Palmas
21:30 (CET)	Scoring by quarter: 22–6, 18–18, 10–18, 24–19
	Pts: McCalebb 17; Rebs: Báez 9 Asts: Oliver 5 PIR: three players 13	Boxscore	Pts: Beaubois 15; Rebs: Voigtmann 8 Asts: Larkin 3 PIR: Budinger 10	Arena: Gran Canaria Arena; Attendance: 7,082; Referees: Conde, Cortés, Sacristán

3 January 2017 15	Baskonia	77–62	Real Madrid	Vitoria-Gasteiz
19:30 (CET)	Scoring by quarter: 20–19, 12–8, 33–15, 12–20
	Pts: Hanga, Larkin 16; Rebs: Voigtmann 7 Asts: Hanga, Larkin 3 PIR: Hanga 18	Boxscore	Pts: Dončić, Fernández 12; Rebs: Hunter 7 Asts: Llull 3 PIR: Randolph 19	Arena: Fernando Buesa Arena; Attendance: 14,316; Referees: Pérez Pizarro, Calatrava, Martínez

8 January 2017 16	Montakit Fuenlabrada	69–77	Baskonia	Fuenlabrada
12:30 (CET)	Scoring by quarter: 20–27, 20–15, 15–23, 14–12
	Pts: Paunić 19; Rebs: Diagne 9 Asts: Rupnik, Sekulić 3 PIR: Paunić 19	Boxscore	Pts: Hanga 21; Rebs: Budinger 12; Asts: Larkin 8 PIR: Hanga 24	Arena: Fernando Martín; Attendance: 5,038; Referees: Peruga, Bultó, Sanchez Mohedas

15 January 2017 17	Baskonia	84–63	RETAbet Bilbao Basket	Vitoria-Gasteiz
18:30 (CET)	Scoring by quarter: 17–8, 24–19, 23–23, 20–13
	Pts: Beaubois 21; Rebs: Diop, Larkin 6 Asts: Larkin 6 PIR: Beaubois 24	Boxscore	Pts: Mumbrú 15; Rebs: Mumbrú 8 Asts: Bamforth 4 PIR: Buva 13	Arena: Fernando Buesa Arena; Attendance: 12,118; Referees: Jiménez Trujillo, Sánchez Monserrat, Fernández

22 January 2017 18	UCAM Murcia	71–92	Baskonia	Murcia
12:30 (CET)	Scoring by quarter: 10–18, 13–25, 20–23, 28–26
	Pts: Benite 27; Rebs: Rojas 10; Asts: Campazzo 3 PIR: Benite 18	Boxscore	Pts: Bargnani 17; Rebs: Budinger, Tillie 6 Asts: Hanga 5 PIR: Larkin 19	Arena: Palacio de Deportes; Attendance: 5,604; Referees: Martín Bertrán, Araña, Serrano

29 January 2017 19	Baskonia	84–92	FC Barcelona Lassa	Vitoria-Gasteiz
18:30 (CET)	Scoring by quarter: 21–20, 14–21, 21–27, 28–24
	Pts: Larkin, Voigtmann 16; Rebs: Sedekerskis, Voigtmann 5 Asts: Larkin 7 PIR: Larkin 20	Boxscore	Pts: Tomić 21; Rebs: Claver 7 Asts: Rice 8 PIR: Tomić 25	Arena: Fernando Buesa Arena; Attendance: 10,678; Referees: García González, Bultó, Caballero

5 February 2017 20	MoraBanc Andorra	vs.	Baskonia	Andorra la Vella
12:30 (CET)
		Boxscore		Arena: Poliesportiu d'Andorra

12 February 2017 21	Baskonia	vs.	Rio Natura Monbus Obradoiro	Vitoria-Gasteiz
18:00 (CET)
		Boxscore		Arena: Fernando Buesa Arena

26 February 2017 22	Tecnyconta Zaragoza	vs.	Baskonia	Zaragoza
19:00 (CET)
		Boxscore		Arena: Pabellón Príncipe Felipe

5 March 2017 23	Baskonia	vs.	Valencia Basket	Vitoria-Gasteiz
18:30 (CET)
		Boxscore		Arena: Fernando Buesa Arena

24	vs.

26	vs.

27	vs.

28	vs.

29	vs.

30	vs.

31	vs.

32	vs.

33	vs.

34	vs.

==== Results overview ====
Win Draw Loss

Opposition	Home score	Away score	Double
Divina Seguros Joventut		83–90	
FC Barcelona Lassa	84–92	98–92	176–190
Herbalife Gran Canaria		74–61	
Iberostar Tenerife	72–73		
ICL Manresa	82–69		
Montakit Fuenlabrada		69–77	
MoraBanc Andorra	95–77		
Movistar Estudiantes	82–77		
Real Betis Energía Plus		60–94	
Real Madrid	77–62		
RETAbet Bilbao Basket	84–63		
Rio Natura Monbus Obradoiro		76–92	
Tecnyconta Zaragoza	101–92		
UCAM Murcia	87–75	71–92	179–146
Unicaja		82–72	
Valencia Basket		99–91	

=== EuroLeague ===
==== League table ====
Pos	Team	Pld	W	L	PF	PA	PD	Qualification
5	(Turkey) Fenerbahçe	30	18	12	2256	2233	+23	Advance to Playoffs
6	(Turkey) Anadolu Efes	30	17	13	2472	2467	+5	Advance to Playoffs
7	(Spain) Baskonia	30	17	13	2445	2376	+69	Advance to Playoffs
8	(Turkey) Darüşşafaka Doğuş	30	16	14	2358	2353	+5	Advance to Playoffs
9	(Serbia) Crvena zvezda mts	30	16	14	2203	2196	+7	

Source: EuroLeague
Rules for classification: All points scored in extra period(s) will not be counted in the standings, nor for any tie-break situation.

==== Results summary ====
Overall						Home					Away				
Pld	W	L	PF	PA	PD	W	L	PF	PA	PD	W	L	PF	PA	PD
20	12	8	1619	1573	+46	8	2	821	726	+95	4	6	798	847	−49

Last updated: January 27, 2017.
Source: Competitive matches

==== Results by round ====
Round	1	2	3	4	5	6	7	8	9	10	11	12	13	14	15	16	17	18	19	20	21	22	23	24	25	26	27	28	29	30
Ground	H	A	A	H	A	H	A	H	A	H	H	A	H	A	H	H	A	A	H	A	H	A	A	H	A	H	A	H	A	H
Result	W	L	W	L	W	W	L	W	L	W	W	W	W	L	W	W	L	L	L	W										
Position	7	12	8	10	8	3	4	3	8	5	5	4	4	5	4	3	4	4	7	6										

Last updated: January 27, 2017.
Source: Competitive matches
Ground: A = Away; H = Home; R = Rest. Result: L = Loss; W = Win; R = Rest; P = Postponed.

==== Matches ====
Win Loss

14 October 2016 1	Baskonia (Spain)	85–84	(Turkey) Anadolu Efes	Vitoria-Gasteiz
21:00 (CEST)	Scoring by quarter: 25–27, 24–24, 19–22, 17–11
	Pts: Bargnani 26; Rebs: Shengelia 9 Asts: Larkin 5 PIR: Bargnani 23	Boxscore	Pts: Brown 16; Rebs: Dunston, Granger 4 Asts: Heurtel 5 PIR: Dunston 14	Arena: Fernando Buesa Arena; Attendance: 10,126; Referees: Christos Christodoulou (GRE), Carmelo Paternico (ITA), Miloš Koljenšić (MNE)

21 October 2016 2	Žalgiris (Lithuania)	78–73	(Spain) Baskonia	Kaunas
19:00 (CEST)	Scoring by quarter: 20–23, 14–17, 27–21, 17–12
	Pts: Westermann 20; Rebs: Jankūnas 9 Asts: Lekavičius 5 PIR: Westermann 24	Boxscore	Pts: Hanga 18; Rebs: Blažič 8 Asts: Larkin 6 PIR: Bargnani 19	Arena: Žalgirio Arena; Attendance: 11,277; Referees: Sreten Radović (CRO), Sašo Petek (SLO), Petri Mäntylä (FIN)

25 October 2016 3	Real Madrid (Spain)	87–91	(Spain) Baskonia	Madrid
21:00 (CEST)	Scoring by quarter: 19–32, 24–22, 23–15, 21–22
	Pts: Ayón 16; Rebs: Randolph 13; Asts: Dončić, Fernández 4 PIR: Dončić 24	Boxscore	Pts: Blažič 21; Rebs: Voigtmann 11; Asts: Larkin 5 PIR: Voigtmann 26	Arena: Barclaycard Center; Attendance: 10,098; Referees: Damir Javor (SLO), Emin Moğulkoç (TUR), Tomislav Hordov (CRO)

27 October 2016 4	Baskonia (Spain)	90–95	(Greece) Olympiacos	Vitoria-Gasteiz
21:00 (CEST)	Scoring by quarter: 27–22, 25–25, 22–25, 16–23
	Pts: Shengelia 20; Rebs: Voigtmann 8 Asts: Larkin 11; PIR: Larkin, Shengelia 20	Boxscore	Pts: Mantzaris 17; Rebs: Birch 8 Asts: Spanoulis 15; PIR: Spanoulis 25	Arena: Fernando Buesa Arena; Attendance: 10,867; Referees: Milivoje Jovčić (SRB), Piotr Pastusiak (POL), Aare Halliko (EST)

4 November 2016 5	Crvena zvezda mts (Serbia)	63–70	(Spain) Baskonia	Belgrade
19:00 (CET)	Scoring by quarter: 15–22, 13–15, 20–22, 15–11
	Pts: Gudurić 12; Rebs: Jenkins 8 Asts: Gudurić 4 PIR: Bjelica, Gudurić 14	Boxscore	Pts: Beaubois, Larkin 16; Rebs: Voigtmann 8 Asts: Larkin 6 PIR: Larkin 18	Arena: Kombank Arena; Attendance: 16,578; Referees: Jakub Zamojski (POL), Petros Papapetrou (GRE), Amit Balak (ISR)

11 November 2016 6	Baskonia (Spain)	86–52	(Turkey) Fenerbahçe	Vitoria-Gasteiz
21:00 (CET)	Scoring by quarter: 14–11, 27–13, 26–16, 19–12
	Pts: three players 13; Rebs: Voigtmann 13; Asts: Larkin, Luz 6 PIR: Voigtmann 22	Boxscore	Pts: Sloukas 9 Rebs: Udoh 7 Asts: Kalinić 3 PIR: Udoh 12	Arena: Fernando Buesa Arena; Attendance: 14,128; Referees: Christos Christodoulou (GRE), Saša Pukl (SLO), Carmelo Paternico (ITA)

15 November 2016 7	EA7 Emporio Armani Milan (Italy)	88–76	(Spain) Baskonia	Desio
20:45 (CET)	Scoring by quarter: 27–17, 22–18, 23–21, 16–20
	Pts: Sanders 19; Rebs: McLean 5 Asts: Hickman 3 PIR: Sanders 16	Boxscore	Pts: Larkin 21; Rebs: Voigtmann 6 Asts: Larkin 9 PIR: Larkin 36	Arena: PalaBancoDesio; Attendance: 6,416; Referees: Borys Rhyzhyk (UKR), Robert Lottermoser (GER), Elias Koromilas (GRE)

17 November 2016 8	Baskonia (Spain)	81–74	(Germany) Brose Bamberg	Vitoria-Gasteiz
20:30 (CET)	Scoring by quarter: 16–23, 16–24, 23–16, 26–11
	Pts: Beaubois, Voigtmann 20; Rebs: Voigtmann 9 Asts: Larkin 6 PIR: Voigtmann 25	Boxscore	Pts: Miller 16; Rebs: Melli 12; Asts: Zisis 5 PIR: Melli 18	Arena: Fernando Buesa Arena; Attendance: 9,437; Referees: Sreten Radović (CRO), Damir Javor (SLO), Aare Halliko (EST)

25 November 2016 9	CSKA Moscow (Russia)	112–84	(Spain) Baskonia	Moscow
18:00 (CET)	Scoring by quarter: 17–27, 32–19, 34–23, 29–15
	Pts: Teodosić 34; Rebs: Augustine, Kurbanov 10; Asts: Teodosić 10; PIR: Teodosić 43	Boxscore	Pts: Beaubois 19; Rebs: Voigtmann 9 Asts: Voigtmann 9 PIR: Voigtmann 19	Arena: Megasport Arena; Attendance: 6,823; Referees: Luigi Lamonica (ITA), Matej Boltauzer (SLO), Seffi Shemmesh (ISR)

2 December 2016 10	Baskonia (Spain)	69–62	(Turkey) Galatasaray Odeabank	Vitoria-Gasteiz
21:00 (CET)	Scoring by quarter: 22–9, 14–23, 18–16, 15–14
	Pts: Voigtmann, Beaubois 13; Rebs: Tillie 11; Asts: Larkin 9 PIR: Voigtmann 18	Boxscore	Pts: Schilb, Pleiß 16; Rebs: Pleiß 11; Asts: Schilb, Güler; PIR: Pleiß 24	Arena: Fernando Buesa Arena; Attendance: 10,678; Referees: Borys Ryzhyk (UKR), Oļegs Latiševs (LAT), Spiros Gkontas (GRE)

9 December 2016 11	Baskonia (Spain)	73–52	(Turkey) Darüşşafaka Doğuş	Vitoria-Gasteiz
21:00 (CET)	Scoring by quarter: 18–9, 19–10, 18–14, 18–19
	Pts: Larkin 14; Rebs: Tillie, Voigtmann 9 Asts: Larkin 5 PIR: Hanga 17	Boxscore	Pts: Anderson 11; Rebs: Moerman 9 Asts: Wilbekin 3 PIR: Wilbekin 10	Arena: Fernando Buesa Arena; Attendance: 10,437; Referees: Christos Christodoulou (GRE), Ilija Belošević (SRB), Petri Mäntylä (FIN)

15 December 2016 12	UNICS (Russia)	91–92	(Spain) Baskonia	Kazan
17:00 (CET)	Scoring by quarter: 20–22, 20–21, 27–24, 24–25
	Pts: Langford 28; Rebs: Williams 6 Asts: Colom 6 PIR: Langford 26	Boxscore	Pts: Larkin 22; Rebs: Budinger 6 Asts: Larkin 6 PIR: Larkin 26	Arena: Basket Hall Kazan; Attendance: 3,246; Referees: Damir Javor (SLO), Milivoje Jovčić (SRB), Ioannis Foufis (GRE)

21 December 2016 13	Baskonia (Spain)	65–62	(Spain) FC Barcelona Lassa	Vitoria-Gasteiz
20:30 (CET)	Scoring by quarter: 9–16, 15–14, 23–15, 18–17
	Pts: Beaubois 19; Rebs: Voigtmann 8 Asts: Luz 3 PIR: Beaubois 18	Boxscore	Pts: Tomić 18; Rebs: Claver 8 Asts: Rice 8 PIR: Tomić 27	Arena: Fernando Buesa Arena; Attendance: 14,236; Referees: Fernando Rocha (POR), Oļegs Latiševs (LAT), Jakub Zamojski (POL)

23 December 2016 14	Panathinaikos Superfoods (Greece)	69–68	(Spain) Baskonia	Athens
20:15 (CET)	Scoring by quarter: 27–18, 10–23, 18–18, 14–9
	Pts: Singleton 23; Rebs: N. Calathes 6 Asts: N. Calathes 6 PIR: Singleton 26	Boxscore	Pts: Shengelia 17; Rebs: Diop 10; Asts: Larkin 3 PIR: Diop 16	Arena: Olympic Sports Center Athens; Attendance: 10,500; Referees: Luigi Lamonica (ITA), Matej Boltauzer (SLO), Tomislav Hordov (CRO)

29 December 2016 15	Baskonia (Spain)	101–88	(Israel) Maccabi Tel Aviv	Vitoria-Gasteiz
21:00 (CET)	Scoring by quarter: 30–24, 12–16, 29–24, 30–24
	Pts: Voigtmann 23; Rebs: Voigtmann 9 Asts: Larkin 13; PIR: Voigtmann 26	Boxscore	Pts: Rudd 20; Rebs: Rudd 5 Asts: Mekel, Rudd 5 PIR: Rudd 32	Arena: Fernando Buesa Arena; Attendance: 14,875; Referees: Ilija Belošević (SRB), Spiros Gkontas (GRE), Clemens Fritz (GER)

5 January 2017 16	Baskonia (Spain)	102–70	(Russia) UNICS	Vitoria-Gasteiz
21:00 (CET)	Scoring by quarter: 25–15, 28–21, 24–14, 25–20
	Pts: Beaubois 29; Rebs: Voigtmann 8 Asts: Larkin 8 PIR: Beaubois 25	Boxscore	Pts: Langford 19; Rebs: Langford, Parakhouski 6 Asts: Langford 5 PIR: Langford 29	Arena: Fernando Buesa Arena; Attendance: 10,645; Referees: Robert Lottermoser (GER), Emin Moğulkoç (TUR), Uroš Obrknežević (SRB)

12 January 2017 17	Darüşşafaka Doğuş (Turkey)	98–89	(Spain) Baskonia	Istanbul
18:00 (CET)	Scoring by quarter: 20–24, 27–22, 30–22, 21–21
	Pts: Bertāns 29; Rebs: Clyburn, Moerman 9 Asts: Bertāns 5 PIR: Bertāns 31	Boxscore	Pts: Hanga 19; Rebs: Voigtmann 8 Asts: Larkin 9 PIR: Hanga, Budinger 19	Arena: Volkswagen Arena; Attendance: 4,126; Referees: Sreten Radović (CRO), Ioannis Foufis (GRE), Mario Majkić (SLO)

20 January 2017 18	Olympiacos (Greece)	92–62	(Spain) Baskonia	Piraeus
20:00 (CET)	Scoring by quarter: 24–17, 26–11, 26–15, 16–19
	Pts: three players 12; Rebs: Birch, Papanikolaou 7 Asts: Spanoulis 7 PIR: Papanikolaou 19	Boxscore	Pts: Larkin 12; Rebs: Voigtmann, Hanga 8 Asts: three players 2 PIR: Hanga 17	Arena: Peace and Friendship Stadium; Attendance: 9,592; Referees: Saša Pukl (SLO), Boris Ryzhyk (UKR), Seffi Shemmesh (ISR)

24 January 2017 19	Baskonia (Spain)	69–87	(Serbia) Crvena zvezda mts	Vitoria-Gasteiz
21:30 (CET)	Scoring by quarter: 15–25, 12–25, 22–20, 20–17
	Pts: Larkin 16; Rebs: Voigtmann 6 Asts: Larkin, Hanga 4 PIR: Larkin 19	Boxscore	Pts: Simonović 23; Rebs: Kuzmić 6 Asts: Jović 12; PIR: Jović 29	Arena: Fernando Buesa Arena; Attendance: 9,542; Referees: Luigi Lamonica (ITA), Oļegs Latiševs (LAT), Jurgis Laurinavičius (LTU)

27 January 2017 20	FC Barcelona Lassa (Spain)	79–93	(Spain) Baskonia	Barcelona
19:00 (CET)	Scoring by quarter: 20–21, 23–32, 20–30, 16–10
	Pts: Rice 15; Rebs: Tomić 7 Asts: Koponen 5 PIR: Vezenkov 22	Boxscore	Pts: Larkin 18; Rebs: Hanga 7 Asts: Larkin, Laprovíttola 5 PIR: Larkin, Hanga 21	Arena: Palau Blaugrana; Attendance: 5,208; Referees: Robert Lottermoser (GER), Milivoje Jovčić (SRB), Piotr Pastusiak (POL)

3 February 2017 21	Baskonia (Spain)	vs.	(Spain) Real Madrid	Vitoria-Gasteiz
20:30 (CET)
		Boxscore		Arena: Fernando Buesa Arena

9 February 2017 22	Maccabi Tel Aviv (Israel)	vs.	(Spain) Baskonia	Tel Aviv
20:05 (CET)
		Boxscore		Arena: Menora Mivtachim Arena

24 February 2017 23	Anadolu Efes (Turkey)	vs.	(Spain) Baskonia	Istanbul
18:00 (CET)
		Boxscore		Arena: Abdi İpekçi Arena

2 March 2017 24	Baskonia (Spain)	vs.	(Italy) EA7 Emporio Armani Milan	Vitoria-Gasteiz
21:00 (CET)
		Boxscore		Arena: Fernando Buesa Arena

9 March 2017 25	Fenerbahçe (Turkey)	vs.	(Spain) Baskonia	Istanbul
18:45 (CET)
		Boxscore		Arena: Fenerbahçe Ülker Sports Arena

17 March 2017 26	Baskonia (Spain)	vs.	(Russia) CSKA Moscow	Vitoria-Gasteiz
21:00 (CET)
		Boxscore		Arena: Fernando Buesa Arena

21 March 2017 27	Brose Bamberg (Germany)	vs.	(Spain) Baskonia	Bamberg
20:00 (CET)
		Boxscore		Arena: Brose Arena

23 March 2017 28	Baskonia (Spain)	vs.	(Greece) Panathinaikos Superfoods	Vitoria-Gasteiz
21:00 (CET)
		Boxscore		Arena: Fernando Buesa Arena

31 March 2017 29	Galatasaray Odeabank (Turkey)	vs.	(Spain) Baskonia	Istanbul
19:00 (CEST)
		Boxscore		Arena: Abdi İpekçi Arena

6 April 2017 30	Baskonia (Spain)	vs.	(Lithuania) Žalgiris	Vitoria-Gasteiz
21:00 (CEST)
		Boxscore		Arena: Fernando Buesa Arena

==== Results overview ====
Win Draw Loss

Opposition	Home score	Away score	Double
(Turkey) Anadolu Efes	85–84		
(Germany) Brose Bamberg	81–74		
(Serbia) Crvena zvezda mts	69–87	63–70	139–150
(Russia) CSKA Moscow		112–84	
(Turkey) Darüşşafaka Doğuş	73–52	98–89	162–150
(Italy) EA7 Emporio Armani Milan		88–76	
(Spain) FC Barcelona Lassa	65–62	79–93	158–141
(Turkey) Fenerbahçe	86–52		
(Turkey) Galatasaray Odeabank	69–62		
(Israel) Maccabi Tel Aviv	101–88		
(Greece) Olympiacos	90–95	92–62	152–187
(Greece) Panathinaikos Superfoods		69–68	
(Spain) Real Madrid		87–91	
(Russia) UNICS	102–70	91–92	194–161
(Lithuania) Žalgiris		78–73	

=== Copa del Rey ===
Win Loss

16 February 2017 Quarterfinals	Baskonia	vs.	Iberostar Tenerife	Vitoria-Gasteiz
19:00 (CET)
		Boxscore		Arena: Fernando Buesa Arena

== Statistics ==
Legend
GP	Games played	GS	Games started	MPG	Minutes per game
FG%	Field-goal percentage	3FG%	3-point field-goal percentage	FT%	Free-throw percentage
RPG	Rebounds per game	APG	Assists per game	SPG	Steals per game
BPG	Blocks per game	PPG	Points per game	PIR	PIR per game

=== Liga ACB ===
Player	GP	GS	MPG	FG%	3FG%	FT%	RPG	APG	SPG	BPG	PPG	PIR
Josh Akognon	0	0	0.0	.000	.000	.000	0.0	0.0	0.0	0.0	0.0	0.0
Andrea Bargnani	0	0	0.0	.000	.000	.000	0.0	0.0	0.0	0.0	0.0	0.0
Rodrigue Beaubois	0	0	0.0	.000	.000	.000	0.0	0.0	0.0	0.0	0.0	0.0
Jaka Blažič	0	0	0.0	.000	.000	.000	0.0	0.0	0.0	0.0	0.0	0.0
Chase Budinger	0	0	0.0	.000	.000	.000	0.0	0.0	0.0	0.0	0.0	0.0
Trevor Cooney	0	0	0.0	.000	.000	.000	0.0	0.0	0.0	0.0	0.0	0.0
Ilimane Diop	0	0	0.0	.000	.000	.000	0.0	0.0	0.0	0.0	0.0	0.0
Ádám Hanga	0	0	0.0	.000	.000	.000	0.0	0.0	0.0	0.0	0.0	0.0
Shane Larkin	0	0	0.0	.000	.000	.000	0.0	0.0	0.0	0.0	0.0	0.0
Rafa Luz	0	0	0.0	.000	.000	.000	0.0	0.0	0.0	0.0	0.0	0.0
Pablo Prigioni	0	0	0.0	.000	.000	.000	0.0	0.0	0.0	0.0	0.0	0.0
Tadas Sedekerskis	0	0	0.0	.000	.000	.000	0.0	0.0	0.0	0.0	0.0	0.0
Tornike Shengelia	0	0	0.0	.000	.000	.000	0.0	0.0	0.0	0.0	0.0	0.0
Kim Tillie	0	0	0.0	.000	.000	.000	0.0	0.0	0.0	0.0	0.0	0.0
Johannes Voigtmann	0	0	0.0	.000	.000	.000	0.0	0.0	0.0	0.0	0.0	0.0

Last updated: June 27, 2016.
Source: ACB

=== EuroLeague ===
Player	GP	GS	MPG	FG%	3FG%	FT%	RPG	APG	SPG	BPG	PPG	PIR
Josh Akognon	0	0	0.0	.000	.000	.000	0.0	0.0	0.0	0.0	0.0	0.0
Andrea Bargnani	0	0	0.0	.000	.000	.000	0.0	0.0	0.0	0.0	0.0	0.0
Rodrigue Beaubois	0	0	0.0	.000	.000	.000	0.0	0.0	0.0	0.0	0.0	0.0
Jaka Blažič	0	0	0.0	.000	.000	.000	0.0	0.0	0.0	0.0	0.0	0.0
Chase Budinger	0	0	0.0	.000	.000	.000	0.0	0.0	0.0	0.0	0.0	0.0
Trevor Cooney	0	0	0.0	.000	.000	.000	0.0	0.0	0.0	0.0	0.0	0.0
Ilimane Diop	0	0	0.0	.000	.000	.000	0.0	0.0	0.0	0.0	0.0	0.0
Ádám Hanga	0	0	0.0	.000	.000	.000	0.0	0.0	0.0	0.0	0.0	0.0
Shane Larkin	0	0	0.0	.000	.000	.000	0.0	0.0	0.0	0.0	0.0	0.0
Rafa Luz	0	0	0.0	.000	.000	.000	0.0	0.0	0.0	0.0	0.0	0.0
Pablo Prigioni	0	0	0.0	.000	.000	.000	0.0	0.0	0.0	0.0	0.0	0.0
Tadas Sedekerskis	0	0	0.0	.000	.000	.000	0.0	0.0	0.0	0.0	0.0	0.0
Tornike Shengelia	0	0	0.0	.000	.000	.000	0.0	0.0	0.0	0.0	0.0	0.0
Kim Tillie	0	0	0.0	.000	.000	.000	0.0	0.0	0.0	0.0	0.0	0.0
Johannes Voigtmann	0	0	0.0	.000	.000	.000	0.0	0.0	0.0	0.0	0.0	0.0

Last updated: June 27, 2016.
Source: EuroLeague

=== Copa del Rey ===
Player	GP	GS	MPG	FG%	3FG%	FT%	RPG	APG	SPG	BPG	PPG	PIR
Andrea Bargnani	0	0	0.0	.000	.000	.000	0.0	0.0	0.0	0.0	0.0	0.0
Rodrigue Beaubois	0	0	0.0	.000	.000	.000	0.0	0.0	0.0	0.0	0.0	0.0
Jaka Blažič	0	0	0.0	.000	.000	.000	0.0	0.0	0.0	0.0	0.0	0.0
Chase Budinger	0	0	0.0	.000	.000	.000	0.0	0.0	0.0	0.0	0.0	0.0
Ilimane Diop	0	0	0.0	.000	.000	.000	0.0	0.0	0.0	0.0	0.0	0.0
Ádám Hanga	0	0	0.0	.000	.000	.000	0.0	0.0	0.0	0.0	0.0	0.0
Shane Larkin	0	0	0.0	.000	.000	.000	0.0	0.0	0.0	0.0	0.0	0.0
Rafa Luz	0	0	0.0	.000	.000	.000	0.0	0.0	0.0	0.0	0.0	0.0
Pablo Prigioni	0	0	0.0	.000	.000	.000	0.0	0.0	0.0	0.0	0.0	0.0
Tadas Sedekerskis	0	0	0.0	.000	.000	.000	0.0	0.0	0.0	0.0	0.0	0.0
Tornike Shengelia	0	0	0.0	.000	.000	.000	0.0	0.0	0.0	0.0	0.0	0.0
Kim Tillie	0	0	0.0	.000	.000	.000	0.0	0.0	0.0	0.0	0.0	0.0
Johannes Voigtmann	0	0	0.0	.000	.000	.000	0.0	0.0	0.0	0.0	0.0	0.0

Last updated: June 27, 2016.
Source: ACB

=== Supercopa de España ===
Player	GP	GS	MPG	FG%	3FG%	FT%	RPG	APG	SPG	BPG	PPG	PIR
Jaka Blažič	1	0	20.0	.167	.000	.500	5.0	1.0	0.0	1.0	3.0	0.0
Trevor Cooney	1	1	25.0	.750	.600	.000	2.0	0.0	0.0	0.0	15.0	11.0
Ilimane Diop	1	1	18.0	.600	.000	.000	2.0	1.0	0.0	2.0	6.0	5.0
Ádám Hanga	1	1	29.0	.545	.000	.750	3.0	3.0	3.0	1.0	15.0	16.0
Shane Larkin	1	0	20.0	.500	.250	1.000	0.0	2.0	1.0	0.0	12.0	9.0
Rafa Luz	1	1	20.0	.500	.500	.000	1.0	7.0	0.0	0.0	5.0	8.0
Tadas Sedekerskis	1	0	6.0	.000	.000	.000	2.0	0.0	0.0	0.0	0.0	0.0
Tornike Shengelia	1	0	20.0	.857	.000	.571	3.0	1.0	0.0	0.0	16.0	14.0
Kim Tillie	1	1	20.0	.000	.000	1.000	6.0	0.0	1.0	0.0	2.0	6.0
Johannes Voigtmann	1	0	22.0	.375	.000	.000	5.0	1.0	0.0	2.0	6.0	5.0

Last updated: September 23, 2016.
Source: ACB
