= Andrea Bargnani =

Italian basketball player (born 1985)

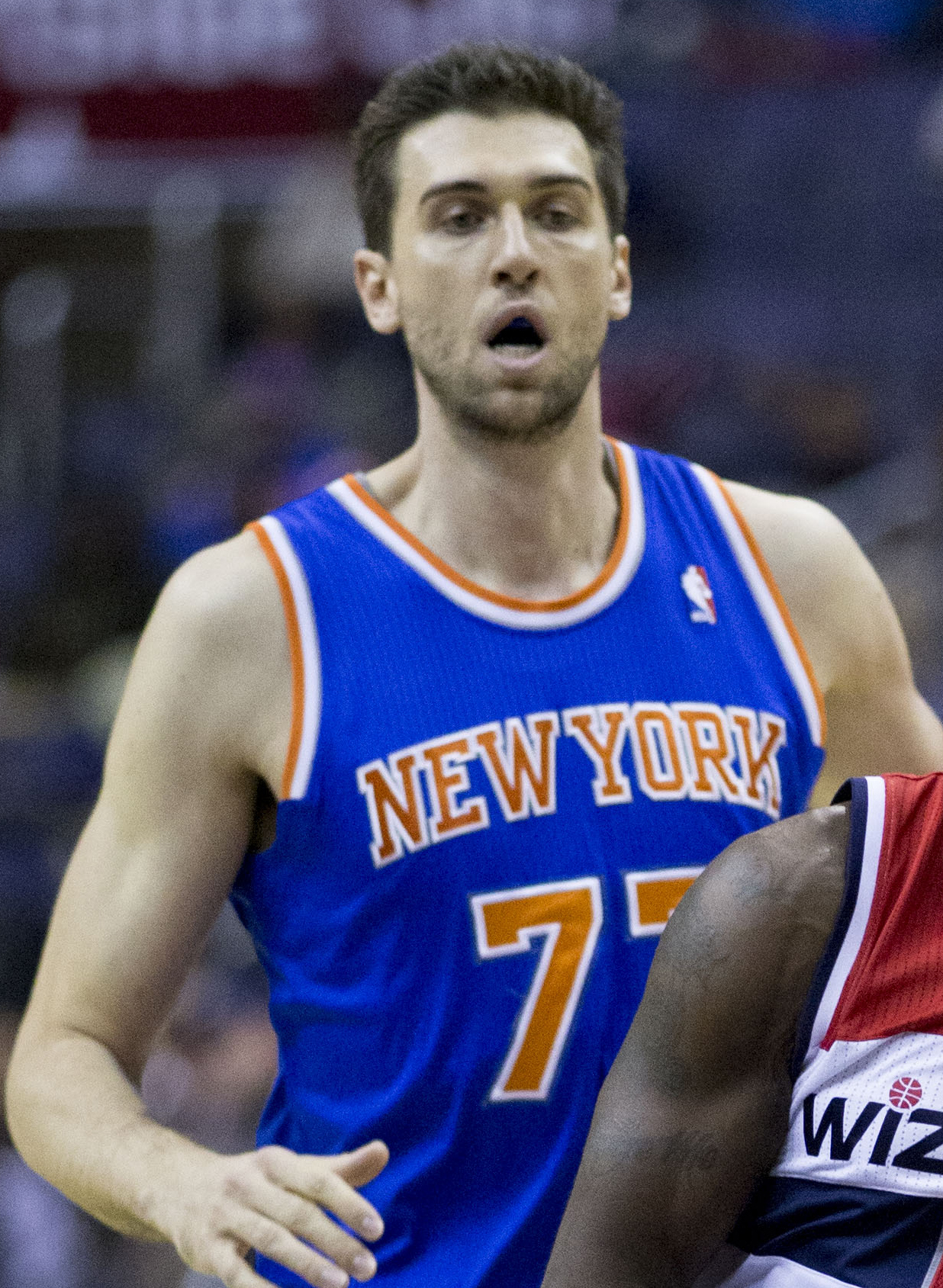
- Bargnani with the New York Knicks in 2013

Personal information
- Born: 26 October 1985 (age 41) Rome, Lazio, Italy
- Listed height: 7 ft 0 in (2.13 m)
- Listed weight: 245 lb (111 kg)

Career information
- NBA draft: 2006: 1st round, 1st overall pick
- Drafted by: Toronto Raptors
- Playing career: 2002–2017
- Position: Power forward / center
- Number: 7, 77, 9

Career history
- 2002–2003: Stella Azzurra Roma
- 2003–2006: Benetton Treviso
- 2006–2013: Toronto Raptors
- 2013–2015: New York Knicks
- 2015–2016: Brooklyn Nets
- 2016–2017: Baskonia

Career highlights
- NBA All-Rookie First Team (2007); EuroLeague Rising Star (2006); Italian League champion (2006); 2× Italian Cup winner (2004, 2005); Italian League Best Player Under 22 (2006)

Career statistics
- Points: 7,873 (14.3 ppg)
- Rebounds: 2,541 (4.6 rpg)
- Assists: 653 (1.2 apg)
- Stats at NBA.com
- Stats at Basketball Reference

Andrea Bargnani (Italian pronunciation: [anˈdrɛːa barˈɲaːni]; born 26 October 1985) is an Italian former professional basketball player. The 7-foot (2.13 m) power forward-center played for Benetton Treviso in the Italian LBA and the EuroLeague before being selected first overall in the 2006 NBA draft by the Toronto Raptors. He spent 10 seasons in the NBA, including with the New York Knicks and Brooklyn Nets, before ending his career with a stint in Spain during the 2016–17 season.

== Professional career ==
=== Stella Azzurra Roma (2002–2003) ===
Bargnani began his basketball career in 2002–03 with Stella Azzurra Roma in the Italian fourth-tiered league Serie B2, averaging 13.2 points and 4.5 rebounds in 23 games.

=== Benetton Treviso (2003–2006) ===
In 2003–04, Bargnani joined LBA side Benetton Treviso. He posted averages of 4.2 points and 1.6 rebounds in 10 games. He made eight appearances in the EuroLeague, recording 2.4 points and 1.5 rebounds per outing. Incidentally, Bargnani faced his future team, the Toronto Raptors, on 20 October 2003 in a pre-season game at Air Canada Centre. He tallied 13 points, five rebounds, one steal and two blocks in 22 minutes in an 86–83 defeat to the Raptors.

In 2004–05, he averaged 6.8 points and 3.1 rebounds in 28 LBA games for Benetton, and averaged 3.7 points and 2.1 rebounds in 12 EuroLeague matches.

In the 2005–06 LBA season, he averaged 12 points, 5.6 rebounds, 1.3 blocks and 1.4 steals in 47 games for Benetton. He posted a season high of 25 points against Rome. He shot .483 from the field and .399 from three-point range, and led the LBA in blocks with 63. In the process, he helped lead Benetton to the 2006 LBA title. In the 2005–06 EuroLeague season, he contributed 10.9 points, 4.1 rebounds and 1.3 steals, while shooting .508 percent from the floor and .434 from three-point range in 18 games. He posted a season-high 20 points against Panathinaikos and Strasbourg. Bargnani was subsequently named the EuroLeague Rising Star, the award given to each EuroLeague season's best EuroLeague player aged 22 or under, for the 2005–06 season.

=== Toronto Raptors (2006–2013) ===
==== 2006–07 season ====
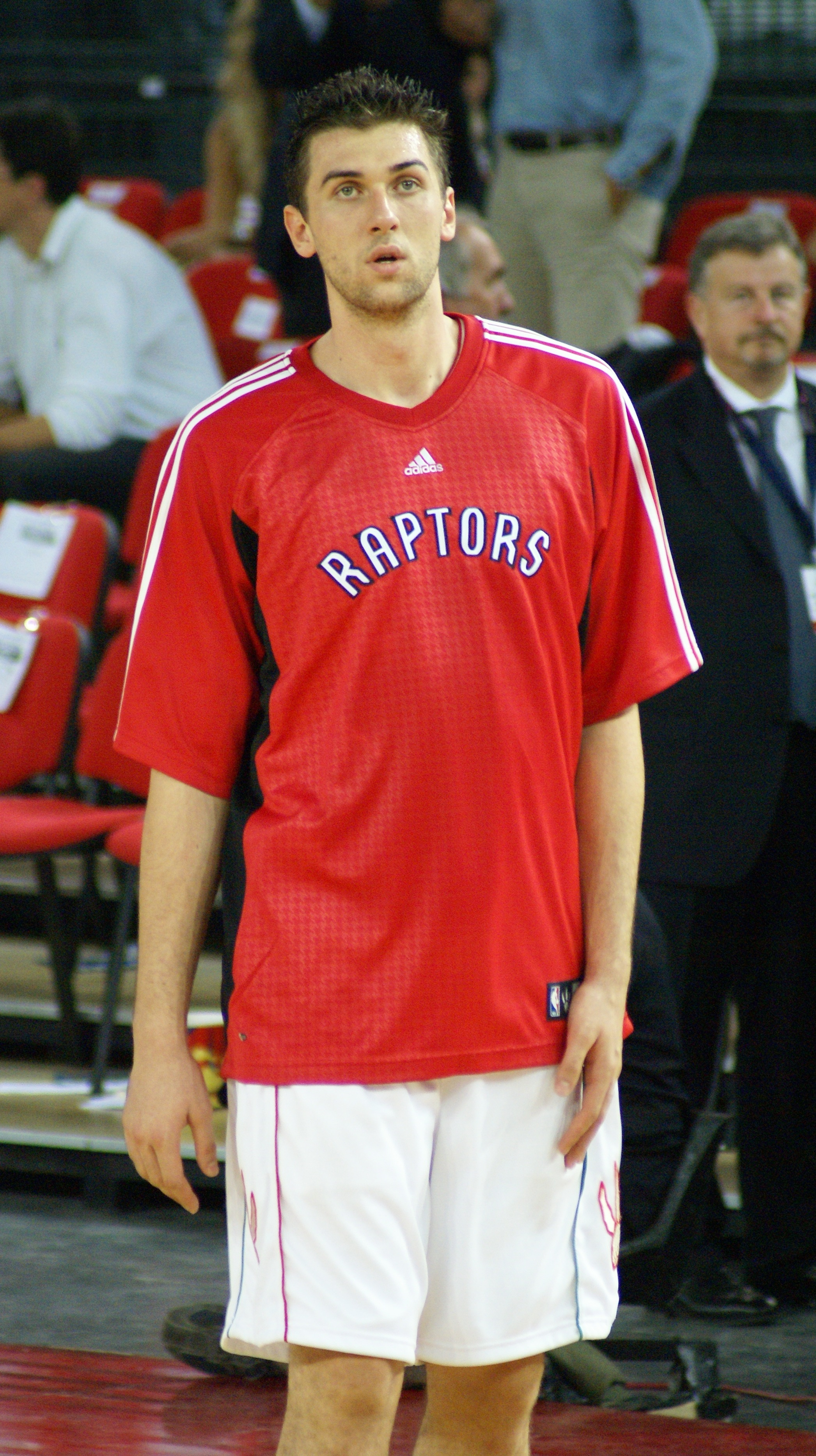
Bargnani with the Raptors in 2007

As a prospect, Bargnani drew many comparisons to German NBA player Dirk Nowitzki, mainly due to his ability to shoot from the perimeter, his mobility despite his size, and his ball-handling skills. Bargnani entered the 2006 NBA draft and was selected first overall by the Toronto Raptors. He is the first European player, sixth non-American player, and second player without U.S. college or high school experience to be drafted first overall, after Yao Ming.

Bargnani made his regular-season debut against the New Jersey Nets on 1 November 2006, posting 2 points, 2 rebounds and 2 blocks in eight minutes of play. In the process, he also became the fourth-ever Italian-born player to play in the NBA. Like many rookies, Bargnani took some time to adapt to the league and as he slowly improved his game, his confidence and playing time increased. In turn, the home fans soon warmed up to Bargnani; on 7 January 2007, ten thousand Bargnani figurines were given away at Air Canada Centre for the game against the Washington Wizards. As the mid-season approached, Bargnani was selected as NBA's Eastern Conference Rookie of the Month (January 2007), joining teammate Jorge Garbajosa (winner of the award in December 2006) as the sixth Raptors player to win the monthly honour. Together with Garbajosa, Bargnani was also selected to play in the T-Mobile Rookie Challenge game. After the All-Star break, Bargnani continued to work on his defence and shooting (averaging 14.3 points per game (ppg) and 3.9 rebounds per game (rpg) in 12 games in February 2007), and he was selected as the Eastern Conference Rookie of the Month for the second straight time on 1 March 2007. Bargnani became the third Raptor ever to win the award twice, joining Vince Carter and Damon Stoudamire.

On 21 March 2007, Bargnani underwent emergency appendectomy surgery after being taken to hospital following illness experienced after practice the night before. He recovered after about a month, and ended the season averaging 11.6 points and 3.9 rebounds per game. His performances were credited as helping the Raptors to their first-ever Division title, as well as their first NBA playoffs berth in five years; Bargnani came in second for NBA Rookie of the Year. In the 2007 NBA playoffs, Bargnani averaged 11.0 ppg and 4.0 rpg as the Raptors were defeated by the New Jersey Nets 4–2 in the first round. On 8 May 2007, Bargnani and Garbajosa were named to the NBA All-Rookie team.

==== 2007–08 season ====
On 5 October 2007, the Raptors announced they had exercised a third-year option on Bargnani, giving a guaranteed NBA contract through the 2008–09 season and retaining a fourth-year option for the 2009–10 season. Prior to the 2007–08 season, Bargnani was voted by the general managers of the league as the "international player most likely to have a breakout season". He was selected to play with the Sophomores in the T-Mobile Rookie Challenge during the NBA All-Star Game. Bargnani was widely criticised for having a poor season. His statistics had gone down, he was not grabbing enough rebounds, was unable to shoot well, got into foul trouble easily and did not drive to the basket enough. He did not feature prominently in the playoffs either—in which the Raptors were eliminated by the Orlando Magic in the first round—and there were even calls for him to be traded.

==== 2008–09 season ====
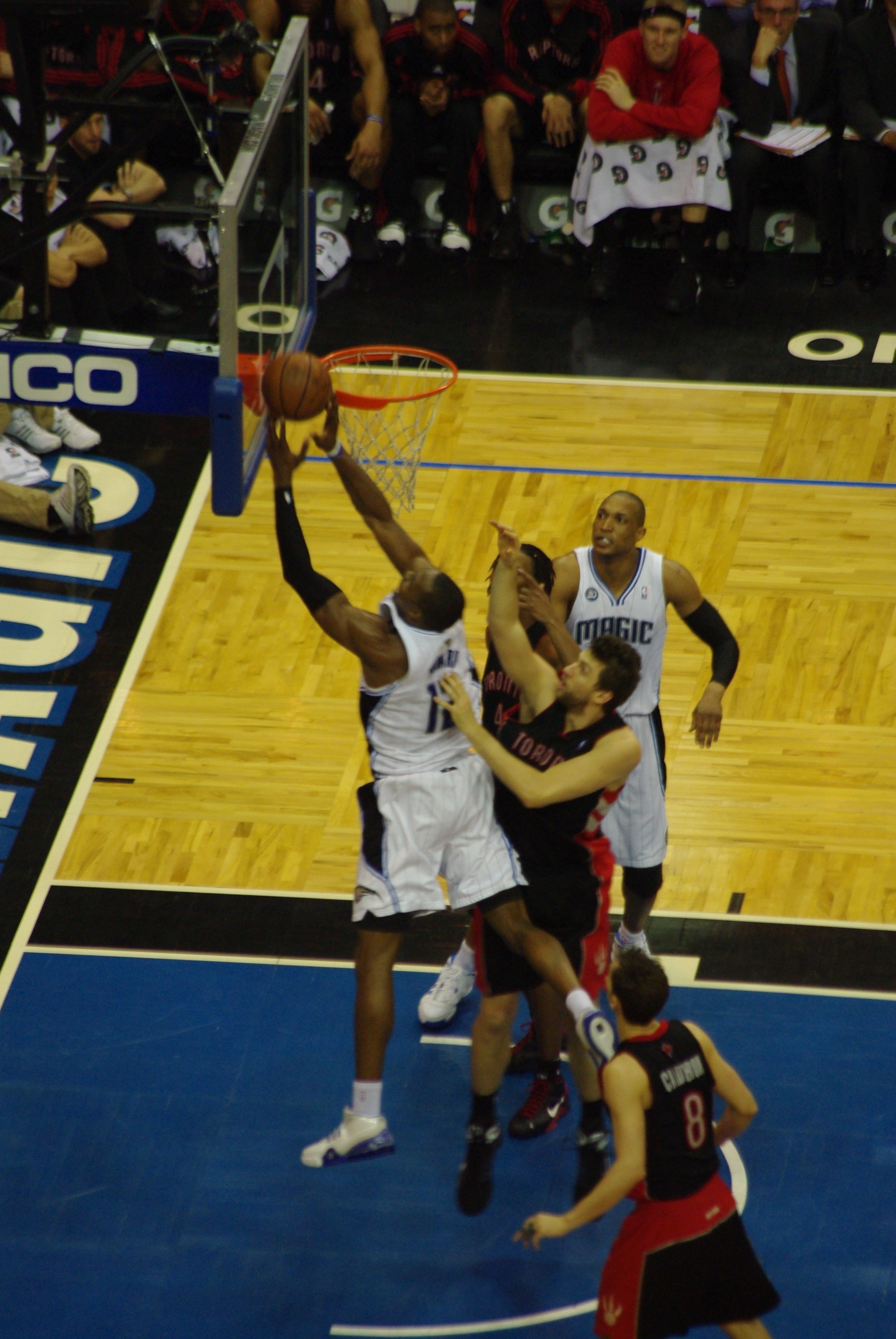
Bargnani averaged 15.4 points and 1.3 blocks per game in the second half of the 2008–09 season.

However, Toronto did not give up on Bargnani yet and committed the entire summer coaching him to become a more effective interior player, forcing him to drive to the basket more and settle less for jump shots. The arrival of six-time NBA All-Star Jermaine O'Neal also meant that Bargnani was likely to come off the bench in most games, with Bosh and O'Neal forming the starting frontcourt. During the summer he worked hard on his body, putting up some more weight (adding some 15 pounds [7 kg] of muscle); this work showed his effects in the first games of the regular campaign, when he was more willing to rebound in traffic and drive to the basket. He also seemed to rediscover his shooting stroke, had better shot selection and became a consistent shot-blocker, and he was soon moved to the starting line-up as small forward.

On 21 November 2008, Bargnani recorded a career-high 29 points, as well as 10 rebounds in an overtime loss against New Jersey. After some stumbles in December, he hit good form in January, averaging 21.2 points and 6.7 rebounds over a 15-game stretch as he became the starting center in place for the injured O'Neal, recording a career-high 31 points against Chicago in the process. O'Neal was then traded to Miami during the All-Star break, allowing the Italian to regain his starting spot for the rest of the season. He averaged 19.8, 17.9 and 20.3 points per game for January, February and March, respectively, even as Toronto went on several losing streaks and gradually fell out of the playoff race. The Raptors concluded the regular season with 33 wins, and ranked 13th in the Eastern Conference. Meanwhile, Bargnani recorded career-high averages in points per game, field goal percentage, three-point percentage, rebounds and blocks. On 8 July 2009, he signed a contract extension with the Raptors that paid him US$50 million over five seasons, starting in 2010–11.

==== 2009–10 season ====
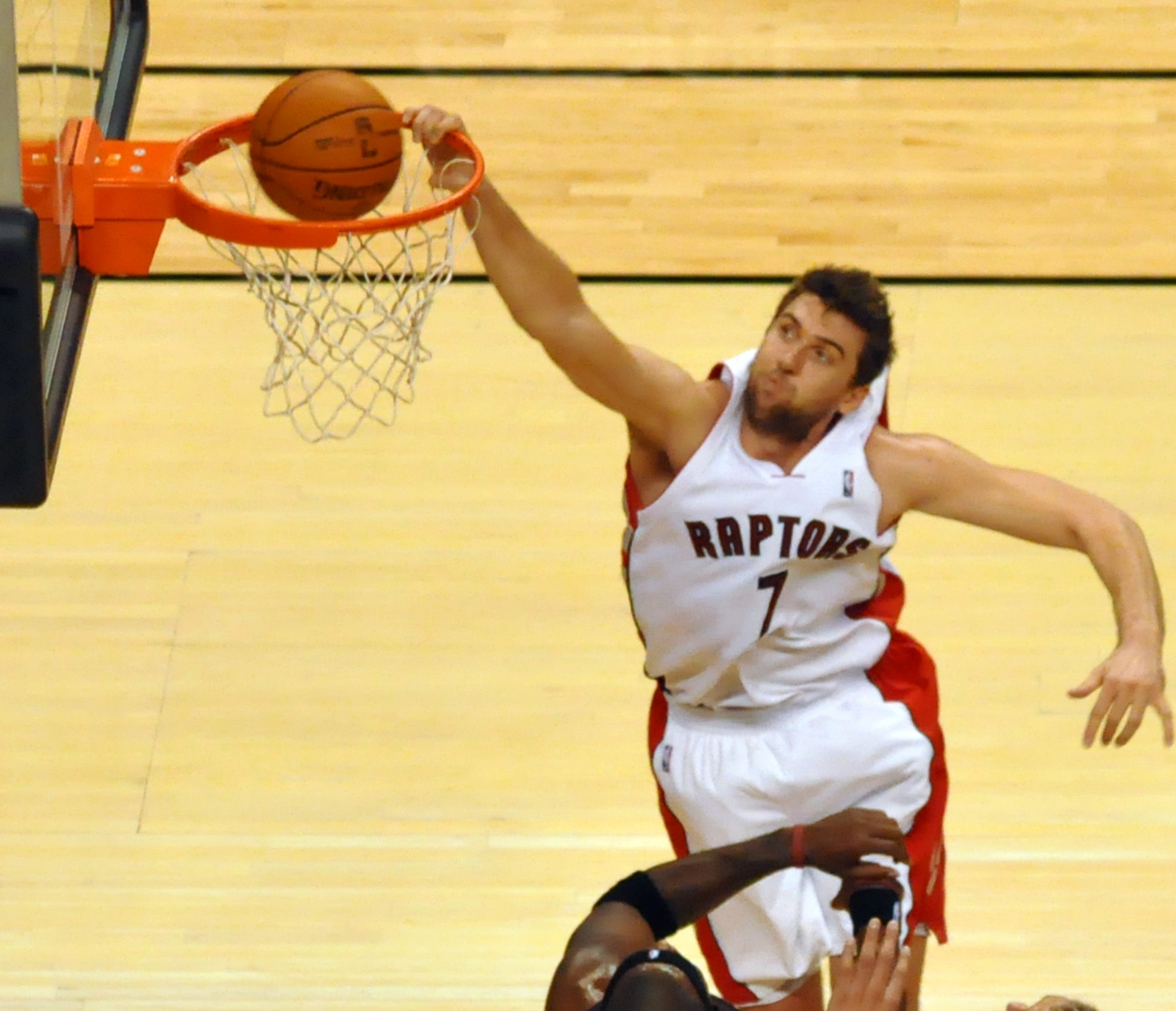
Bargnani going in for a dunk in a game against Miami, 20 November 2009

Bargnani's form and numbers continued in the 2009–10 season. In the first ten games, the center averaged 19.3 points, 5.7 rebounds and 1.1 blocks per game; by mid-season, he had seven double-doubles, a career high. Toronto struggled at the start of the season, going as low as six games below .500, but reached the mid-point with a 21–20 record. On 2 February 2010, Bargnani scored a career-high 34 points in a loss against the Indiana Pacers; he later scored 33 in a game against the Detroit Pistons. Although Toronto were six games above .500 at one point, their form spiralled downwards after the All-Star break. Coupled with two separate injuries to Chris Bosh, Toronto slid from the fifth seed to the eighth, and were subsequently locked in a race with Chicago for the final spot. That spot was only decided on the final day, when Chicago won their last game and ended the season 41–41, one game ahead of Toronto. On Bargnani's part, he averaged career highs in points, rebounds, blocks and minutes.

==== 2010–11 season ====
Toronto's franchise player Chris Bosh opted to leave for Miami as a free agent after his contract with the Raptors was up. As a result, Bargnani became the focal point of Toronto's offense. On 8 December 2010, he scored a career-high 41 points in a losing effort against the New York Knicks. Bargnani had a career year, averaging 21 points, 5 rebounds and 1 block.

==== 2011–12 season ====
During the 2011 NBA lockout, Bargnani chose not to sign overseas and decided instead to work on his game and develop into more of a power forward following the Raptors' acquisition of Lithuanian center Jonas Valančiūnas in the 2011 NBA draft. On 28 March 2012, in a game against the Denver Nuggets, Bargnani scored 26 points and became the fourth player to ever score 6,000 points as a Raptor.

==== 2012–13 season ====
After managing the first 21 games of the season, Bargnani missed the next two months of action with the Raptors following an elbow injury in early December. He returned to the line-up on 6 February 2013, but after managing another 14 games, he was ruled out for the rest of the season on 13 March because of the same injury.

=== New York Knicks (2013–2015) ===
==== 2013–14 season ====
On 10 July 2013, Bargnani was traded to the New York Knicks in exchange for Steve Novak, Marcus Camby and Quentin Richardson, along with a future first-round draft pick (2016) and two future second-round draft picks (2014 and 2017).

On 18 December 2013, in a game at the Milwaukee Bucks, with 20 seconds remaining in overtime in which the Knicks held a two-point lead, Bargnani received an offensive rebound and shot a three-pointer that missed (instead of dribbling out the clock or getting fouled to go to the free throw line). The game went into double-overtime as a result, where the Knicks fortunately outscored the Bucks 13–7 to hold on for a 107–101 win.

On 22 January 2014, in a loss to the Philadelphia 76ers, Bargnani suffered a torn ligament in his left elbow after a failed dunk attempt, and was ruled out indefinitely, eventually missing the rest of the regular season. The Knicks finished the season at 37–45 and missed the playoffs.

==== 2014–15 season ====
After missing most of the preseason with a hamstring injury, Bargnani was set to make his season debut on 22 November when he was ruled out indefinitely again with a strained calf muscle. He went on to make his season debut on 31 December against the Los Angeles Clippers after having not played for nearly a year. In just under 20 minutes of action off the bench, he recorded 9 points, 4 rebounds and 2 assists in the 78–99 loss. However, the following game on 2 January, Bargnani re-injured his right calf during the first quarter of the Knicks' 81–97 loss to the Detroit Pistons. He missed a further 16 games before making his second return of the season against Miami on 9 February.

=== Brooklyn Nets (2015–2016) ===
On 17 July 2015, Bargnani signed with the Brooklyn Nets. He made his debut for the Nets in the team's season opener against the Chicago Bulls on 28 October, recording 17 points and 7 rebounds off the bench in a 115–100 loss. On 10 December, he scored a season-high 23 points in a 110–91 win over the Philadelphia 76ers. On 20 February 2016, he was waived by the Nets.

=== Baskonia (2016–2017) ===
On 26 July 2016, Bargnani returned to Europe and signed a two-year deal with Spanish club Baskonia. On 14 October 2016, in his first EuroLeague game of the season, Bargnani scored a season-best 26 points in an 85–84 win over Anadolu Efes. On 26 April 2017, Baskonia parted ways with Bargnani after a plague of injuries. In 15 EuroLeague games, he averaged 8.8 points per game, and in 14 ACB games, he averaged 11.5 points per game.

== National team career ==
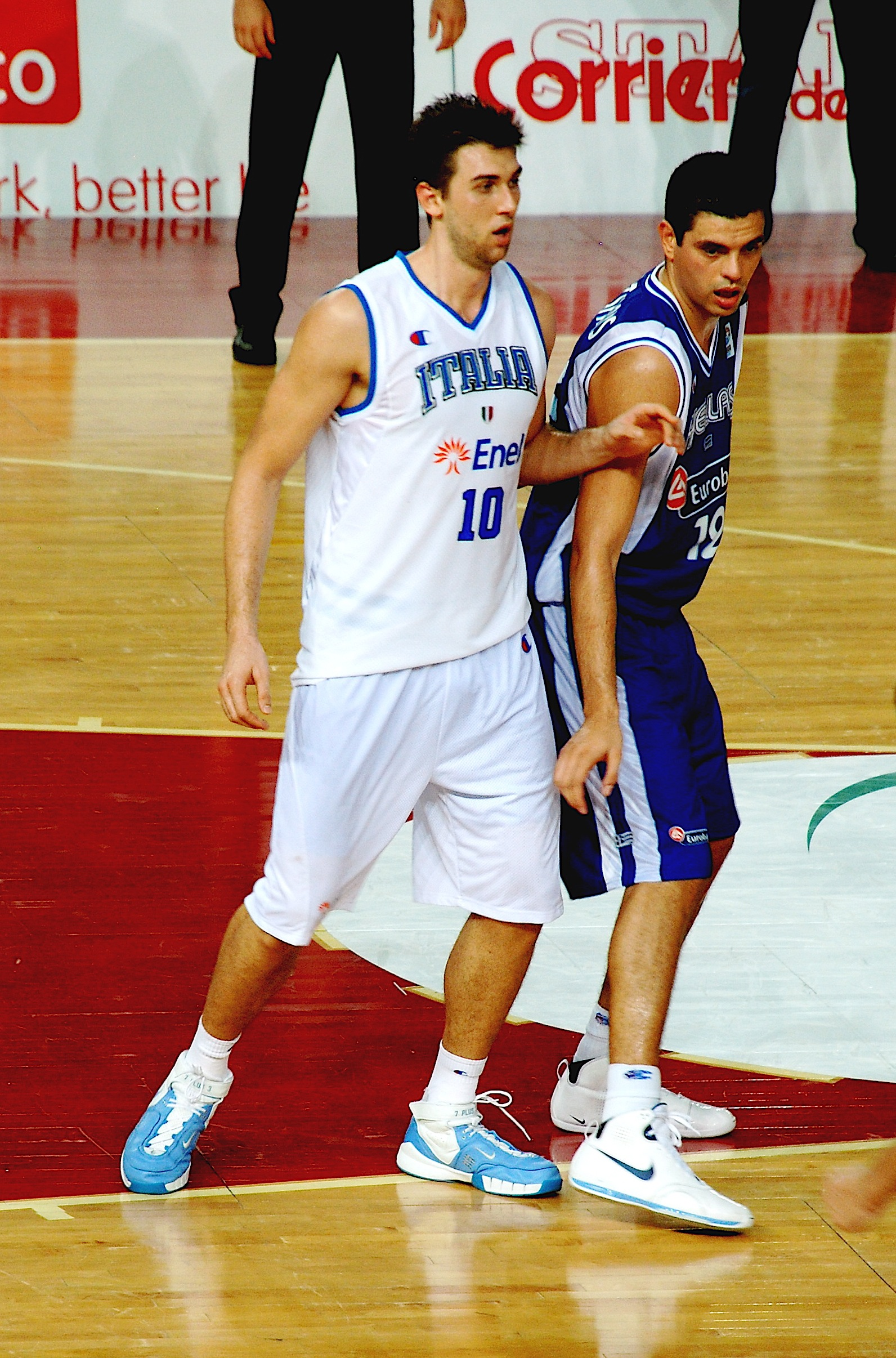
Bargnani playing for the Italian national team

Bargnani played for the Italian junior and under-20 national teams. He competed on the World Select Team at the 2004 Nike Hoop Summit. He also featured in EuroBasket 2007, representing the Italian senior national team. Italy finished ninth in the competition, and in six games, Bargnani averaged 12.7 points and 5.0 rebounds in 28.7 minutes per game.

He was called up to the Italian squad that took part in EuroBasket 2015. Bargnani averaged 14.8 points and 3.6 rebounds per game, while Italy finished the tournament in sixth place.

== Post-retirement ==
In 2025, he was named LBA executive advisor.

== Career statistics ==
Legend
GP	Games played	GS	Games started	MPG	Minutes per game
FG%	Field goal percentage	3P%	3-point field goal percentage	FT%	Free throw percentage
RPG	Rebounds per game	APG	Assists per game	SPG	Steals per game
BPG	Blocks per game	PPG	Points per game	**Bold**	Career high

=== NBA ===
==== Regular season ====
Year	Team	GP	GS	MPG	FG%	3P%	FT%	RPG	APG	SPG	BPG	PPG
2006–07	Toronto	65	2	25.1	.427	.373	.824	3.9	.8	.5	.8	11.6
2007–08	Toronto	78	53	23.9	.386	.345	.840	3.7	1.1	.3	.5	10.2
2008–09	Toronto	78	59	31.4	.450	**.409**	.831	5.3	1.2	.4	1.2	15.4
2009–10	Toronto	**80**	**80**	35.0	**.470**	.372	.774	**6.3**	1.2	.3	1.4	17.2
2010–11	Toronto	66	66	**35.7**	.448	.345	.820	5.2	1.8	.5	**1.7**	**21.4**
2011–12	Toronto	31	31	33.3	.432	.296	**.873**	5.5	**2.0**	**.6**	.5	19.5
2012–13	Toronto	35	25	28.7	.400	.311	.844	3.7	1.1	**.6**	.7	12.7
2013–14	New York	42	39	29.9	.442	.278	.825	5.3	1.1	.3	1.2	13.3
2014–15	New York	29	22	27.1	.454	.366	.813	4.4	1.6	.1	.9	14.8
2015–16	Brooklyn	46	0	13.8	.455	.188	.825	2.1	.4	.1	.2	6.6
Career		550	377	28.7	.439	.354	.824	4.6	1.2	.4	.9	14.3

==== Playoffs ====
Year	Team	GP	GS	MPG	FG%	3P%	FT%	RPG	APG	SPG	BPG	PPG
2007	Toronto	**6**	3	**30.2**	**.478**	**.412**	.789	**4.0**	**1.0**	**.8**	.5	**11.0**
2008	Toronto	5	**5**	20.8	.333	.250	**1.000**	1.4	.4	**.8**	**.6**	6.4
Career		11	8	25.9	.412	.333	.810	2.8	.7	.8	.5	8.9

=== EuroLeague ===
Year	Team	GP	GS	MPG	FG%	3P%	FT%	RPG	APG	SPG	BPG	PPG
2003–04	Benetton	8	0	8.0	**.545**	.200	**.750**	1.5	.0	.3	.1	2.4
2004–05	Benetton	12	0	9.0	.500	**.500**	.400	2.1	.2	.2	.2	3.7
2005–06	Benetton	**18**	**6**	**21.2**	.508	.434	.712	**4.1**	**.5**	**1.3**	**.9**	**10.9**
2016–17	Baskonia	15	5	16.0	.458	.304	**.750**	1.8	.4	.1	.1	8.8
Career		38	6	14.6	.508	.429	.694	2.9	.3	.7	.5	6.8

=== ACB ===
Year	Team	GP	GS	MPG	FG%	3P%	FT%	RPG	APG	SPG	BPG	PPG
2016–17	Baskonia	14	6	20.9	.302	.474	.920	2.5	.7	.3	.4	11.5
Career		14	6	20.9	.302	.474	.920	2.5	.7	.3	.4	11.5

=== LBA ===
Year	Team	GP	GS	MPG	FG%	3P%	FT%	RPG	APG	SPG	BPG	PPG
2003–04	Benetton	10	0	8.6	**.571**	**.556**	.417	1.6	.4	.4	.2	4.2
2004–05	Benetton	28	0	14.8	.493	.289	.679	3.1	**.6**	1.3	.5	6.8
2005–06	Benetton	**47**	**23**	**24.4**	.483	.399	**.790**	**5.6**	**.6**	**1.4**	**1.3**	**12.0**
Career		85	23	19.4	.490	.383	.739	4.3	.5	1.2	.9	9.4

=== International career ===
Year	Competition	GP	GS	MPG	FG%	3P%	FT%	RPG	APG	SPG	BPG	PPG
2007	EuroBasket	6	6	28.7	.373	.360	.688	5.0	.5	**.7**	.2	12.7
2009	EuroBasket qualification	4	4	26.8	.400	.154	.625	5.0	.5	.3	1.0	10.8
2010	EuroBasket qualification	**8**	**8**	30.6	**.524**	**.367**	.732	6.6	.5	.5	**2.0**	**24.1**
2011	EuroBasket	5	3	**34.2**	.466	.350	**.833**	**7.4**	**.8**	.4	1.6	22.8
Career		23	20	30.2	.462	.330	.747	6.1	.6	.5	1.3	18.5

== Awards and honours ==
=== Team ===
- Italian League champion: 2006
- 2× Italian Cup champion: 2004, 2005

=== Individual ===
- EuroLeague Rising Star: 2006
- Italian League Best Player Under 22: 2006
- NBA All-Rookie First Team: 2007
- NBA Live 08: Cover Athlete (Italian Version)

== See also ==
- List of European basketball players in the United States
