= Shane Larkin =

Turkish-American basketball player (born 1992)

- Larkin with Fenerbahçe in 2026

No. 0 – Fenerbahçe
- Position: Point guard / shooting guard
- League: BSL; EuroLeague

Personal information
- Born: October 2, 1992 (age 34) Cincinnati, Ohio, U.S.
- Listed height: 1.82 m (6 ft 0 in)
- Listed weight: 79 kg (174 lb)

Career information
- High school: Dr. Phillips (Orlando, Florida)
- College: Miami (Florida) (2011–2013)
- NBA draft: 2013: 1st round, 18th overall pick
- Drafted by: Atlanta Hawks
- Playing career: 2013–present

Career history
- 2013–2014: Dallas Mavericks
- 2014: →Texas Legends
- 2014–2015: New York Knicks
- 2015–2016: Brooklyn Nets
- 2016–2017: Baskonia
- 2017–2018: Boston Celtics
- 2018–2026: Anadolu Efes
- 2026–present: Fenerbahçe

Career highlights
- 2× EuroLeague champion (2021, 2022); All-EuroLeague First Team (2022); All-EuroLeague Second Team (2021); EuroLeague Top Scorer (2020); EuroLeague 50–40–90 club (2020); EuroLeague 25th Anniversary Team (2025); 3× Turkish Super League champion (2019, 2021, 2023); Turkish Cup winner (2022); Turkish Super League Finals MVP (2019); All-Liga ACB Second Team (2017); Lute Olson Award (2013); Second-team All-American – AP, NABC (2013); Third-team All-American – SN (2013); ACC Player of the Year – Coaches (2013); First-team All-ACC (2013); ACC All-Rookie team (2012)
- Stats at NBA.com
- Stats at Basketball Reference
Medals
Men's basketball
Representing Turkey
EuroBasket
Silver medal – second place	2025 Cyprus–Finland–Poland–Latvia

DeShane Davis Larkin (born October 2, 1992) is a Turkish-American professional basketball player for Fenerbahçe of the Basketbol Süper Ligi (BSL) and the EuroLeague. He also represents the Turkish national team in international competition.

Larkin played college basketball for the University of Miami. He was selected by the Atlanta Hawks with the 18th overall pick in the 2013 NBA draft, where he was immediately traded to the Dallas Mavericks. He last played in the NBA in 2018 with the Boston Celtics. He is the son of Hall of Fame baseball player Barry Larkin.

== Early life ==
Larkin was born in Cincinnati on October 2, 1992, to parents Barry and Lisa Larkin. His father Barry is a Hall of Fame shortstop for the Cincinnati Reds. Other athletes in Larkin's family include his uncles, former Xavier University standout basketball player Byron Larkin, and former Major League first baseman Stephen Larkin. When Larkin was in elementary school, his father's former Reds teammates Tony Pérez and Pete Rose would give the younger Larkin tips on hitting a baseball. After being told this training was "all wrong" by a Little League coach, Larkin quit baseball and decided to focus on basketball.

== High school career ==
Larkin played basketball for Dr. Phillips High School in Orlando, Florida. During his senior year he averaged 18.8 points, 6.4 rebounds, 6.3 assists, and 3.5 steals per game. He was a two-time all-state selection and ended his high school career with 320 career steals, a school record. Larkin was ranked as one of the top 30 point guards by Scout.com. After receiving offers from a number of schools, Larkin committed to DePaul University. He ended up requesting a transfer before the start of his freshman year due to a then unnamed medical condition. He chose Miami, a school closer to home, to help his anxiety, and where he was introduced to meditation and relaxation techniques by a new therapist.

== College career ==
=== Freshman year ===
Larkin missed the first game of the 2011–12 season because of his transfer from DePaul, but received a waiver from the NCAA allowing him to play hours before the Hurricanes' second game against Rutgers. During the first half of the season, Larkin quickly became the first man off the bench, averaging over 25 minutes per game. By the end of January, he had become the Hurricanes' starting point guard; he led the team in steals and was second on the team in assists. Larkin was selected to the All-ACC Freshman team at the conclusion of the season, finishing the year averaging 7.4 points, 2.5 assists, 2.5 rebounds, and 1.6 steals.

=== Sophomore year ===
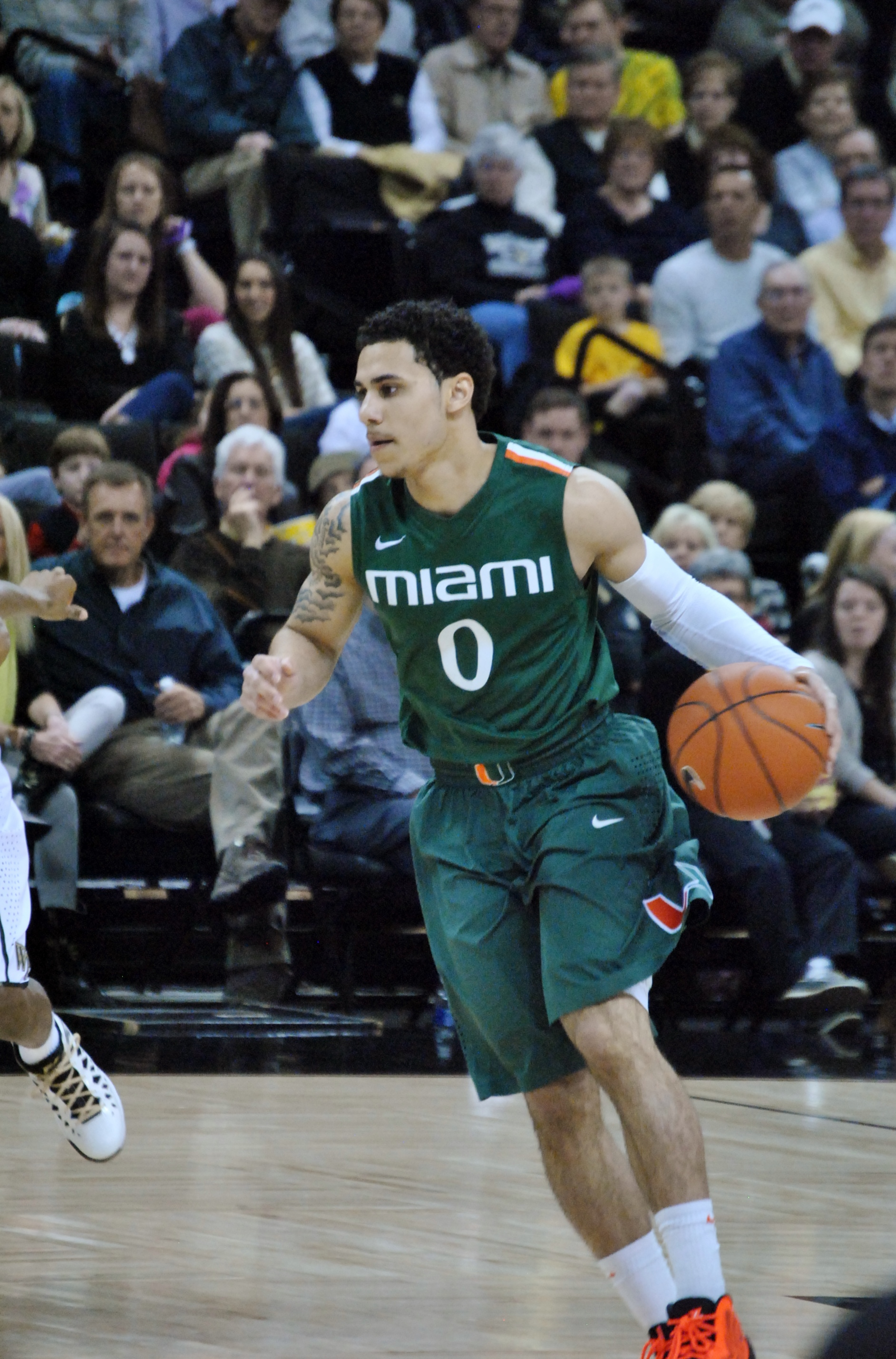
Larkin with the University of Miami, 2013

The 2012–13 Miami Hurricanes basketball team was arguably the best in university history, achieving the school's first ever regular season and tournament Atlantic Coast Conference championship. Larkin was an important player in the team's success, playing some of his best games in many of the most crucial matchups of the season. Against then #1 ranked Duke University, Larkin had 18 points, 10 rebounds, and 5 assists as the Hurricanes blew out Duke by 27 points. Against North Carolina on February 9, Larkin shot 5 for 8 beyond the three-point line, had 9 assists, and delivered an alley-oop pass to Kenny Kadji off the backboard which prompted a standing ovation from Miami Heat players Dwyane Wade and LeBron James who were in attendance. Larkin led the Hurricanes to the Sweet 16 in the 2013 NCAA tournament. He was also selected the ACC Player of the Year by the ACC coaches. Virginia Tech's Erick Green was the ACC media's winner.

== Professional career ==
=== Dallas Mavericks (2013–2014) ===
On June 27, 2013, Larkin was selected by the Atlanta Hawks with the 18th overall pick in the 2013 NBA draft. His draft rights were then traded to the Dallas Mavericks later that night. During a Summer League practice, he broke his ankle and was ruled out for three months. Despite the injury, he signed his rookie scale contract with the Mavericks on July 29. On November 18, 2013, Larkin made his NBA debut, recording 3 points, 3 assists, and 3 steals in a 97–94 win over the Philadelphia 76ers. On January 17, 2014, he scored a career-high 18 points in a 110–107 win over the Phoenix Suns. On April 23, he made his NBA postseason debut against the San Antonio Spurs in Game 2 of the Western Conference First Round. During his rookie season, he had multiple assignments with the Texas Legends of the NBA Development League.

=== New York Knicks (2014–2015) ===
On June 25, 2014, Larkin was traded, along with Wayne Ellington, José Calderón, Samuel Dalembert and two 2014 second-round picks, to the New York Knicks in exchange for Tyson Chandler and Raymond Felton. The following month, he joined the Knicks for the 2014 NBA Summer League. On April 5, 2015, he recorded 15 points and a career-high 11 rebounds in a 101–91 win over the Philadelphia 76ers.

=== Brooklyn Nets (2015–2016) ===
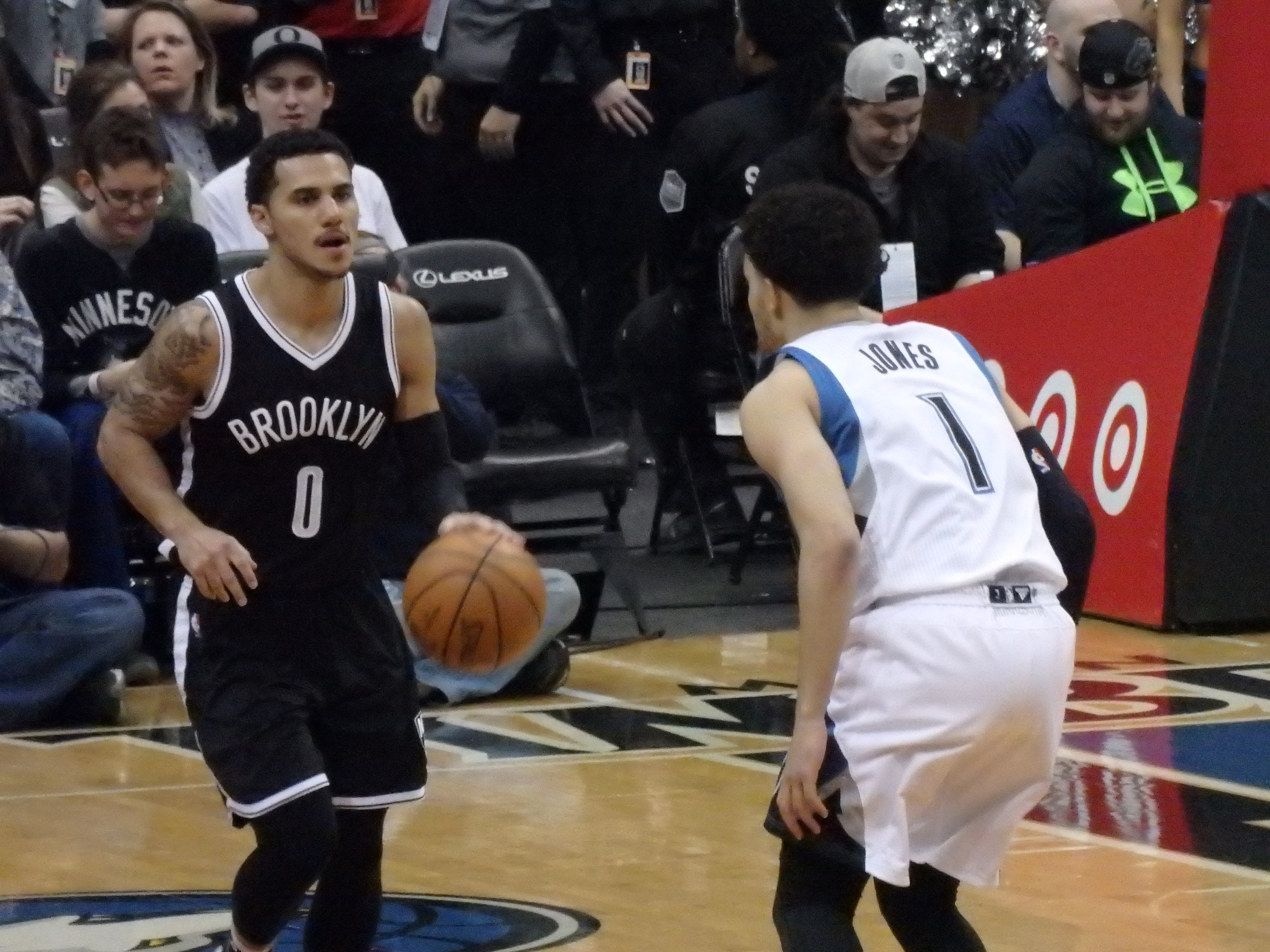
Larkin with the Brooklyn Nets, dribbling against Tyus Jones, 2016

On July 9, 2015, Larkin signed with the Brooklyn Nets. He made his debut for the Nets in the team's season opener against the Chicago Bulls on October 28, recording six points and eight assists as a starter in a 115–100 loss. On January 13, 2016, he scored a then season-high 17 points off the bench in a 110–104 win over his former team, the New York Knicks. On February 1, he recorded eight points, a career-high 14 assists and six rebounds off the bench in a 105–100 loss to the Detroit Pistons. On April 11, he scored a career-high 20 points as a starter in a 120–111 loss to the Washington Wizards.

=== Baskonia (2016–2017) ===
On August 10, 2016, Larkin signed a one-year deal with Baskonia of the Spanish Liga ACB and the EuroLeague. He was named Player of the Month of February 2017 in the Spanish League. On June 28, 2017, Larkin was registered by Baskonia for the right of first refusal. On July 9, 2017, Larkin signed an offer sheet with FC Barcelona Lassa. On July 14, 2017, Baskonia matched the offer sheet to Larkin, keeping Larkin in their roster. Six days later, he reached an agreement with the Boston Celtics, leaving a $6.3 million offer from Baskonia.

=== Boston Celtics (2017–2018) ===
On July 31, 2017, Larkin signed with the Boston Celtics. In the Celtics' regular season finale on April 11, 2018, Larkin had 12 points, 10 assists and seven rebounds in a 110–97 win over the Brooklyn Nets. After the end of the Celtics' playoff run, and Larkin playing a meaningful role during their postseason, Larkin did not hear back from the Celtics apart from a sole exit interview with the Celtics head coach at the time, Brad Stevens. At the start of the offseason, Larkin made it clear that he wanted more responsibility if he would be back in the NBA. He said, “I will not go back to the NBA as a third point guard [...] So, if any team asks about that, we’re not even gonna answer the phone.”

=== Anadolu Efes (2018–2026) ===
On July 26, 2018, Larkin signed a one-year deal with Anadolu Efes of the Turkish Basketball Super League and the EuroLeague. On March 8, 2019, Larkin recorded a then career-high 37 points, shooting 12-of-15 from the field, along with five rebounds and two assists for 43 PIR in a 92–70 win over Barcelona. He was subsequently named EuroLeague Round 25 MVP.

In 2018–19 season, Efes qualified to the 2019 EuroLeague Final Four. In the semifinal, Larkin led his team to the final with a win over Fenerbahçe by scoring 30 points, 7 rebounds and 7 assists; he had a performance index rating (PIR) of 43, which set a new Final Four record. In the championship game against CSKA Moscow, Larkin scored 29 points which was an individual scoring-record for any EuroLeague championship game. Efes lost the final to CSKA, settling for second place. In 35 EuroLeague games played during the 2018–19 season, he averaged 12.5 points, 3.1 assists and 2.2 rebounds per game.

In the Turkish BSL, Efes reached the Finals after beating Banvit and Galatasaray 2–0 and 3–0 respectively. In Game 7 of the BSL Finals against Fenerbahçe, Larkin scored 38 points while shooting 11–18. Larkin led Efes to an 89–74 win and to its first Turkish league title in 10 years. He was subsequently named the BSL Finals MVP.

On November 29, 2019, Larkin set EuroLeague Basketball's then single-game scoring record since the year 2000, with 49 points scored in a game against FC Bayern Munich. However, the league's overall single-game scoring record, including all of the games played since 1958, when FIBA owned the competition, is 99 points scored by Radivoj Korać, on January 14, 1965. His record was broken more than four years later, in March 2024 by Nigel Hayes-Davis.

On May 21, 2022, with Anadolu Efes, Larkin won the EuroLeague again, beating Olympiacos in the semi-final and Real Madrid in the final of the Final Four in Belgrade. Efes was the third team in league history to win back-to-back championships.

On May 3, 2024, Larkin officially renewed his contract with the Turkish powerhouse for four more seasons through 2028.

On October 25, 2024, Larkin hurt his right ankle during a game and was set to be out a few weeks with an ankle sprain. A soft tissue injury and bone edema would force him to sit out for the next few weeks.

On June 30, 2026, Anadolu Efes announced the departure of Larkin after eight years at the club.

=== Fenerbahçe (2026–present) ===
On July 13, 2026, Fenerbahçe announced the signing of Larkin on a 2-year deal, marking the continuation of his European career.

== National team career ==
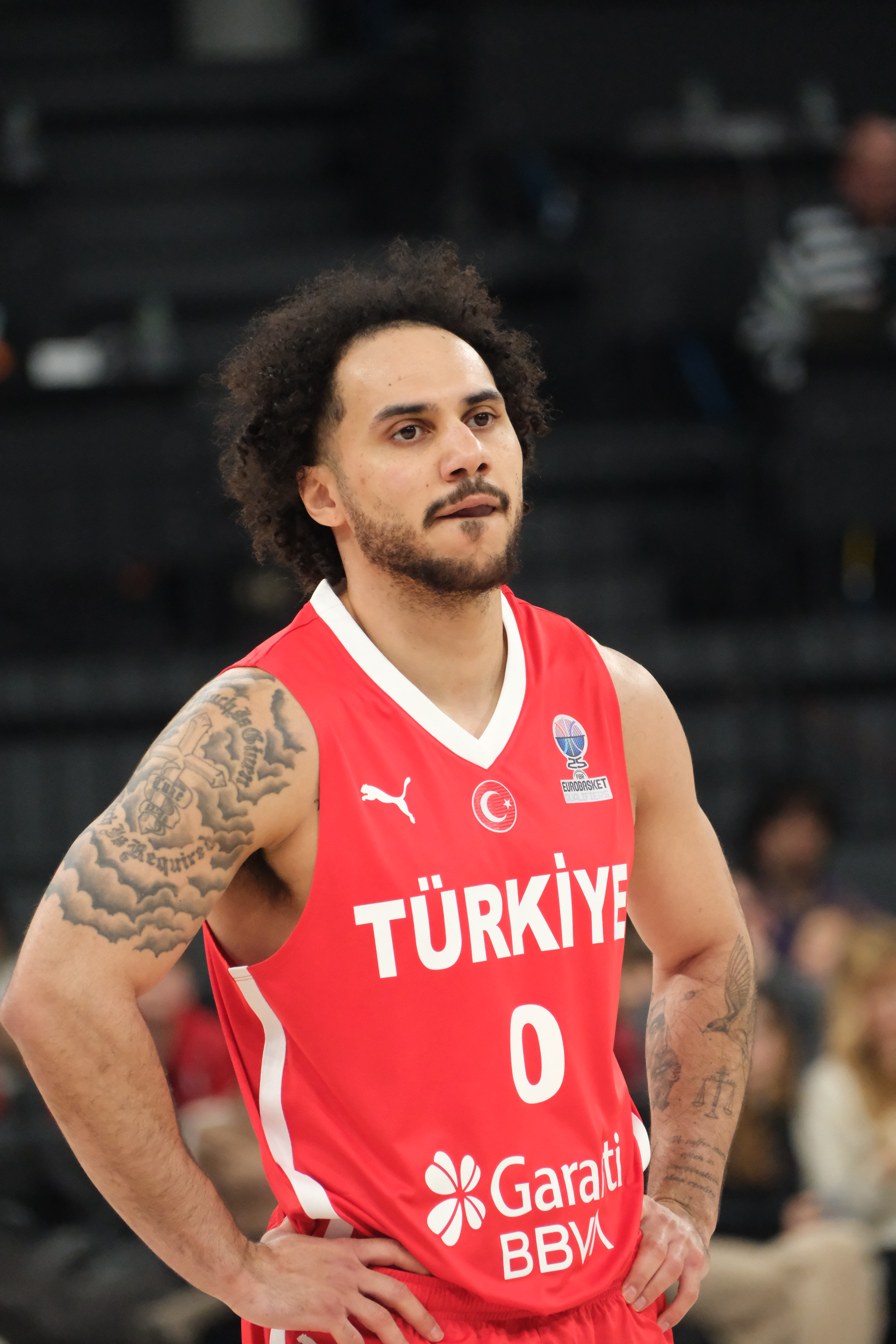
Larkin with the Turkey national team in 2025

Larkin is a member of the senior Turkish national team. In February 2020, it was announced that Larkin would miss the 2021 EuroBasket Qualification Tournament with an injury. Larkin represented Turkey at EuroBasket 2022 and EuroBasket 2025.

In EuroBasket 2025, while Turkey advanced to the knockout rounds by finishing first in group stage and succeeding elimination matches, then reaching the final, Larkin performed a noteworthy performance in all matches. He played 38 minutes in the final game, scoring 13 points and making 9 assists, finished the tournament with averages of 32 minutes, 11.6 points, and 5.1 assists.

== Player profile ==
At 1.82 m (5 ft 11 1/2 in), he can play as a point guard due to his high-level court vision, and tight ball handling, but also can play as a shooting guard due him being a high-volume, high-efficiency scorer, and by having elite off-ball movement, and having the ability to knock down catch-and-shoot three-pointers. This effectively makes him a combo guard.

== Personal life ==
Larkin has been diagnosed with obsessive–compulsive disorder (OCD).

Larkin has stated that he views Turkey as "more of a home" when asked about the possibility of playing for the Turkish national team. On February 7, 2020, it was announced that Larkin received Turkish citizenship.

== Career statistics ==
Legend
GP	Games played	GS	Games started	MPG	Minutes per game
FG%	Field-goal percentage	3P%	3-point field-goal percentage	FT%	Free-throw percentage
RPG	Rebounds per game	APG	Assists per game	SPG	Steals per game
BPG	Blocks per game	PPG	Points per game	PIR	Performance index rating
**Bold**	Career high

=== NBA ===
==== Regular season ====
Year	Team	GP	GS	MPG	FG%	3P%	FT%	RPG	APG	SPG	BPG	PPG
2013–14	Dallas	48	0	10.2	.380	.316	.640	.9	1.5	.5	.0	2.8
2014–15	New York	76	**22**	**24.5**	.433	.302	.782	**2.3**	3.0	**1.2**	.1	6.2
2015–16	Brooklyn	**78**	17	22.4	**.442**	**.361**	.776	**2.3**	**4.4**	**1.2**	**.2**	**7.3**
2017–18	Boston	54	2	14.4	.384	.360	**.865**	1.7	1.8	.5	.1	4.3
Career		256	41	19.1	.422	.336	.777	1.9	2.9	.9	.1	5.5

==== Playoffs ====
Year	Team	GP	GS	MPG	FG%	3P%	FT%	RPG	APG	SPG	BPG	PPG
2014	Dallas	2	0	5.0	.000	.000	—	.5	1.0	—	—	0.0
2018	Boston	**11**	0	**14.0**	**.457**	**.308**	**1.000**	**1.0**	**1.8**	**0.5**	—	**3.7**
Career		13	0	12.6	.421	.286	1.000	.9	1.7	.4	—	3.2

=== EuroLeague ===
†	Denotes season in which Larkin won the EuroLeague
*	Led the league

Year	Team	GP	GS	MPG	FG%	3P%	FT%	RPG	APG	SPG	BPG	PPG	PIR
2016–17	Baskonia	33	**33**	28.9	.406	.343	.797	2.7	**5.7**	**1.3**	**.2**	13.1	14.5
2018–19	Anadolu Efes	35	12	22.0	.498	.449	.866	2.2	3.1	.9	.1	12.5	14.0
2019–20	Anadolu Efes	25	15	30.0	**.530**	**.509**	.903	**3.1**	4.1	**1.3**	.0	**22.2***	**25.8***
2020–21†	Anadolu Efes	35	17	28.7	.439	.392	.862	2.3	4.1	1.2	.1	15.1	17.0
2021–22†	Anadolu Efes	**39**	28	**31.9***	.436	.382	.898	3.0	5.3	**1.3**	.0	14.7	18.7
2022–23	Anadolu Efes	17	8	28.6	.438	.385	.796	2.5	4.8	1.1	—	11.9	14.1
2023–24	Anadolu Efes	35	**33**	31.6	.460	.391	**.908**	2.8	5.1	1.1	.1	16.8	19.9*
2024–25	Anadolu Efes	28	11	26.1	.431	.393	.869	2.6	4.5	1.2	—	11.7	12.9
2025–26	Anadolu Efes	12	10	30.2	.471	.431	.892	2.3	4.2	.3	—	15.2	15.1
2026–27	Fenerbahçe	8	4	18.7	.535	.500	1.000	1.1	2.1	.5	.0	8.5	8.9
Career		267	171	28.3	.456	.408	.872	2.6	4.5	1.1	.1	14.6	17.1

=== Domestic leagues ===
Year	Team	League	GP	MPG	FG%	3P%	FT%	RPG	APG	SPG	BPG	PPG
2013–14	(United States) Texas Legends	D-League	4	35.7	.468	.571	.818	5.2	8.2	2.0	—	15.2
2016–17	(Spain) Baskonia	ACB	37	28.0	.420	.313	.882	3.1	4.9	1.4	.2	14.0
2018–19	(Turkey) Anadolu Efes	TBSL	24	27.7	.459	.367	.943	2.7	4.5	1.5	.1	15.1
2019–20	(Turkey) Anadolu Efes	TBSL	10	23.7	.430	.306	.960	2.7	4.0	1.4	.1	12.9
2020–21	(Turkey) Anadolu Efes	TBSL	23	18.9	.419	.408	.846	1.9	3.2	.6	—	8.2
2021–22	(Turkey) Anadolu Efes	TBSL	31	25.1	.426	.403	.902	2.8	5.0	.8	.1	11.8
2022–23	(Turkey) Anadolu Efes	TBSL	28	27.2	.450	.365	.847	2.7	4.5	1.2	.1	11.3
2023–24	(Turkey) Anadolu Efes	TBSL	15	33.1	.488	.430	.852	3.1	6.7	.9	.1	16.8
2024–25	(Turkey) Anadolu Efes	TBSL	19	25.6	.452	.424	.784	2.7	5.2	1.3	.2	12.6
2025–26	(Turkey) Anadolu Efes	TBSL	13	27.6	.450	.394	.865	2.7	5.5	1.5	.1	13.9
2026-27	(Turkey) Fenerbahçe	TBSL	7	17.0	.417	.364	.500	1.0	1.4	.4	.1	5.7

=== College ===
Year	Team	GP	GS	MPG	FG%	3P%	FT%	RPG	APG	SPG	BPG	PPG
2011–12	Miami	32	19	25.6	.360	.323	**.857**	2.5	2.5	1.6	**.1**	7.4
2012–13	Miami	**36**	**35**	**36.4**	**.479**	**.406**	.777	**3.8**	**4.6**	**2.0**	**.1**	**14.5**
Career		68	54	31.3	.438	.375	.808	3.2	3.6	1.8	.1	11.2
