= Rafa Luz =

Brazilian basketball player (born 1992)

- Luz with Andorra in 2026

No. 5 – BC Andorra
- Position: Point guard
- League: Liga ACB

Personal information
- Born: February 11, 1992 (age 34) Araçatuba, Brazil
- Listed height: 6 ft 2 in (1.88 m)
- Listed weight: 208 lb (94 kg)

Career information
- Playing career: 2009–present

Career history
- 2009–2012: Unicaja
- 2009–2010: →Axarquía
- 2011: →CB Granada
- 2011–2012: →Lucentum
- 2012–2015: Obradoiro
- 2015–2016: Flamengo
- 2016–2017: Baskonia
- 2017–2018: Franca
- 2018–2019: Andorra
- 2019–2021: Murcia
- 2021: Nevėžis Kėdainiai
- 2021–2022: Bilbao Basket
- 2022–present: BC Andorra

Career highlights
- NBB champion (2016)
Medals
Men's basketball
Representing Brazil
FIBA AmeriCup
| Silver medal – second place | 2011 Mar del Plata |
| Silver medal – second place | 2022 Brazil |
FIBA South American Championship
| Bronze medal – third place | 2014 Venezuela |
Pan American Games
| Gold medal – first place | 2015 Toronto |

Rafael Freire Luz (born February 11, 1992), commonly known as Rafa Luz, is a Brazilian-Spanish professional basketball player for BC Andorra of the Liga ACB. He is a point guard.

== Early years ==
Rafa Luz, the brother of several international players for the Brazilian national women's team, was called up to the Brazilian national under-18 team, at the age of 15.

In October 2009, after spending two seasons with Unicaja's junior youth teams, Luz got a Spanish passport.

== Professional career ==
Luz signed for the 2010–11 ACB season with the Spanish club Unicaja, but he ended up playing with the club's farm team, Clínicas Rincón. In March 2011, he was loaned to the Spanish club CB Granada, until the end of the season. There, he averaged 4.8 points, 1.3 rebounds, and 3.1 assists per game in the Spanish ACB League. In August 2011, Unicaja loaned him to Spanish club Lucentum Alicante. Luz averaged 5.6 points, 1.8 rebounds, and 1.7 assists per game in the 2011–12 ACB season.

In August 2012, Luz ended his contract with Unicaja Málaga, and signed a new contract with Spanish club Blu:sens Monbús Obradoiro. He played with the Galician team until 2015, when he left Spain, and returned to Brazil, after signing a new one-year deal with Flamengo of the Brazilian NBB league.

In July 2016, Luz signed a two-year deal with the Spanish club Baskonia. In July 2017, Luz split up from the Basque entity.

On July 19, 2018, Luz signed with MoraBanc Andorra of the Liga ACB. On July 16, 2019, Luz signed a two-year deal with UCAM Murcia.

On February 28, 2021, he has signed with Nevėžis Kėdainiai of the Lithuanian Basketball League.

On July 14, 2021, he has signed with Bilbao Basket of the Liga ACB.

== National team career ==
Luz was a part of the senior men's Brazilian national basketball team that won the silver medal at the 2011 FIBA Americas Championship, which was held in Mar del Plata, Argentina. He also played at the 2013 FIBA Americas Championship, the 2015 Pan American Games, where he won a gold medal, and the 2016 Summer Olympics.
