= 2016–17 ACB season =

Liga Endesa^{1}
- Season: 2016–17
- Games played: 295
- Teams: 17
- TV partner: Movistar+

Regular season
- Top seed: Real Madrid
- Season MVP: (Spain) Sergio Llull
- Relegated: Real Betis Energía Plus; ICL Manresa

Finals
- Champions: Valencia Basket (1st title)
- Runners-up: Real Madrid
- Semi-finalists: Baskonia; Unicaja
- Finals MVP: (Montenegro) Bojan Dubljević

Statistical leaders
Points	(France) Edwin Jackson	21.7
Rebounds	(Croatia) Ante Tomić	7.9
Assists	(United States) Mickey McConnell	6.5
Index Rating	(France) Edwin Jackson	21.9

Records
- Biggest home win: Gran Canaria 111–60 Fuenlabrada (23 October 2016)
- Biggest away win: Zaragoza 57–102 Gran Canaria (26 March 2017)
- Highest scoring: Fuenlabrada 103–97 Estudiantes (4 February 2017)
- Winning streak: 10 games Real Madrid
- Losing streak: 10 games ICL Manresa
- Highest attendance: 14,316; Baskonia 77–62 Real Madrid (3 January 2017)
- Lowest attendance: 2,793; Real Betis 76–59 Andorra (10 May 2017)
- ^{1} Sponsored league name, referring to Endesa.

The 2016–17 ACB season, also known as Liga Endesa for sponsorship reasons, was the 34th season of the Spanish basketball league. It started on 30 September 2016 with the first round of the regular season and ended on 16 June 2017 with the ACB Finals. Real Madrid was the defending champion, but lost the title to Valencia Basket in the finals, which won its first league ever.

== Teams ==
=== Promotion and relegation (pre-season) ===
A total of 18 teams contested the league, including 16 sides from the 2015–16 season and two promoted from the 2015–16 LEB Oro. ACB agreed with Ourense Provincia Termal its promotion to this season instead the previous one if it fulfills successfully the requirements.

Teams promoted from LEB Oro

- ~~Ourense Provincia Termal~~ (did not fulfill the requirements)
- ~~Quesos Cerrato Palencia~~ (resigned to promote due to the impossibility to fulfill the requirements, its place was offered to Movistar Estudiantes)
- ~~Club Melilla Baloncesto~~ (resigned to promote due to the impossibility to fulfill the requirements, its place was offered to RETAbet.es GBC, which resigned to it and finally agreed to play in LEB Oro)

After the resignation of RETAbet.es GBC to play in ACB, the ACB offered its place to Quesos Cerrato Palencia and Club Melilla Baloncesto to complete a league of 18 teams. After both teams refused the invitation, the ACB agreed to play a 17-team league. On 27 September 2016, the league confirmed that the two last qualified teams will be relegated to LEB Oro.

=== Venues and locations ===
Location of teams in 2016–17 ACB
Location of teams from the Canary Islands in 2016–17 ACB

Team	Home city	Arena	Capacity
Baskonia	Vitoria-Gasteiz	Fernando Buesa Arena	15,504
Divina Seguros Joventut	Badalona	Palau Municipal d'Esports	8,500
FC Barcelona Lassa	Barcelona	Palau Blaugrana	7,585
Herbalife Gran Canaria	Las Palmas	Gran Canaria Arena	9,870
Iberostar Tenerife	San Cristóbal de La Laguna	Santiago Martín	5,003
ICL Manresa	Manresa	Nou Congost	5,000
Montakit Fuenlabrada	Fuenlabrada	Fernando Martín	5,100
MoraBanc Andorra	Andorra la Vella, Andorra	Poliesportiu d'Andorra	5,000
Movistar Estudiantes	Madrid	WiZink Center	15,000
Real Betis Energía Plus	Seville	San Pablo	7,626
Real Madrid	Madrid	WiZink Center	15,000
RETAbet Bilbao Basket	Bilbao	Bilbao Arena	10,014
Rio Natura Monbus Obradoiro	Santiago de Compostela	Multiusos Fontes do Sar	5,060
Tecnyconta Zaragoza	Zaragoza	Pabellón Príncipe Felipe	10,744
UCAM Murcia	Murcia	Palacio de Deportes	7,341
Unicaja	Málaga	Martín Carpena	10,233
Valencia Basket	Valencia	Fuente de San Luis	8,500

=== Personnel and sponsorship ===
Team	Head coach	Captain	Kit manufacturer	Shirt sponsor
Baskonia	(Spain) Sito Alonso	(Hungary) Ádám Hanga	Hummel	Rioja
Divina Seguros Joventut	(Spain) Diego Ocampo	(Spain) Albert Ventura	Spalding	Divina Pastora Seguros
FC Barcelona Lassa	(Greece) Georgios Bartzokas	(Spain) Juan Carlos Navarro	Nike	Lassa Tyres
Herbalife Gran Canaria	(Spain) Luis Casimiro	(Dominican Republic) Eulis Báez	Adidas	Herbalife
Iberostar Tenerife	(Spain) Txus Vidorreta	(Argentina) Nicolás Richotti	Austral	Iberostar
ICL Manresa	(Spain) Ibon Navarro	(Spain) Román Montañez	Pentex	ICL Iberia
Montakit Fuenlabrada	(Spain) Jota Cuspinera	(Croatia) Marko Popović	BFS	Montakit
MoraBanc Andorra	(Spain) Joan Peñarroya	(Spain) David Navarro	Kon	MoraBanc
Movistar Estudiantes	(Spain) Salva Maldonado	(Spain) Jaime Fernández	Joma	Movistar
Real Betis Energía Plus	(Croatia) Žan Tabak	(Slovenia) Boštjan Nachbar	Spalding	Energía Plus
Real Madrid	(Spain) Pablo Laso	(Spain) Felipe Reyes	Adidas	Teka
RETAbet Bilbao Basket	(Spain) Carles Duran	(Spain) Álex Mumbrú	Erreà	RETAbet
Rio Natura Monbus Obradoiro	(Spain) Moncho Fernández	(Spain) Pepe Pozas	Vive	Rio Natura, Monbus
Tecnyconta Zaragoza	(Spain) Luis Guil	(Netherlands) Henk Norel	Mercury	Tecnyconta
UCAM Murcia	(Greece) Fotios Katsikaris	(Spain) José Ángel Antelo	Nike	UCAM
Unicaja	(Spain) Joan Plaza	(Spain) Carlos Suárez	Spalding	Unicaja, Benahavís
Valencia Basket	(Spain) Pedro Martínez	(Spain) Rafa Martínez	Luanvi	Cultura del Esfuerzo^{1}

Notes
1. Cultura del Esfuerzo is the motto of the club.

=== Managerial changes ===
Team	Outgoing manager	Manner of departure	Date of vacancy	Position in table	Replaced with	Date of appointment
Herbalife Gran Canaria	(Spain) Aíto García Reneses	End of contract	2 June 2016	Pre-season	(Spain) Luis Casimiro	30 June 2016
Baskonia	(Croatia) Velimir Perasović	Signed for Anadolu Efes	14 June 2016	Pre-season	(Spain) Sito Alonso	8 July 2016
Movistar Estudiantes	(Spain) Sergio Valdeolmillos	Sacked	16 June 2016	Pre-season	(Spain) Salva Maldonado	27 July 2016
FC Barcelona Lassa	(Spain) Xavi Pascual	Sacked	28 June 2016	Pre-season	(Greece) Georgios Bartzokas	8 July 2016
Real Betis Energía Plus	(Spain) Luis Casimiro	End of contract	30 June 2016	Pre-season	(Croatia) Žan Tabak	28 July 2016
Divina Seguros Joventut	(Spain) Salva Maldonado	Resigned	7 July 2016	Pre-season	(Spain) Diego Ocampo	26 July 2016
RETAbet Bilbao Basket	(Spain) Sito Alonso	Resigned	8 July 2016	Pre-season	(Spain) Carles Duran	11 July 2016
UCAM Murcia	(Greece) Fotios Katsikaris	Signed for Lokomotiv Kuban	25 July 2016	Pre-season	(Spain) Óscar Quintana	28 July 2016
UCAM Murcia	(Spain) Óscar Quintana	Sacked	23 January 2017	14th (5–12)	(Greece) Fotios Katsikaris	23 January 2017
Tecnyconta Zaragoza	(Spain) Andreu Casadevall	Sacked	6 March 2017	14th (7–15)	(Spain) Luis Guil	6 March 2017
Real Betis Energía Plus	(Croatia) Žan Tabak	Sacked	10 April 2017	15th (8–18)	(Spain) Alejandro Martínez	10 April 2017

== Regular season ==
=== League table ===
Pos	Team	Pld	W	L	PF	PA	PD	Qualification or relegation
1	Real Madrid	32	25	7	2803	2500	+303	Qualification to playoffs
2	Baskonia	32	23	9	2697	2445	+252	Qualification to playoffs
3	Valencia Basket	32	23	9	2639	2398	+241	Qualification to playoffs
4	Unicaja	32	22	10	2661	2495	+166	Qualification to playoffs
5	Iberostar Tenerife	32	22	10	2466	2277	+189	Qualification to playoffs
6	FC Barcelona Lassa	32	22	10	2631	2426	+205	Qualification to playoffs
7	Herbalife Gran Canaria	32	21	11	2710	2438	+272	Qualification to playoffs
8	MoraBanc Andorra	32	16	16	2611	2687	−76	Qualification to playoffs
9	UCAM Murcia	32	14	18	2558	2565	−7	
10	RETAbet Bilbao Basket	32	14	18	2472	2577	−105	
11	Movistar Estudiantes	32	13	19	2611	2670	−59	
12	Montakit Fuenlabrada	32	12	20	2462	2714	−252	
13	Rio Natura Monbus Obradoiro	32	11	21	2439	2626	−187	
14	Divina Seguros Joventut	32	11	21	2434	2538	−104	
15	Tecnyconta Zaragoza	32	9	23	2534	2710	−176	
16	Real Betis Energía Plus (R)	32	9	23	2432	2683	−251	Relegation to LEB Oro
17	ICL Manresa (R)	32	5	27	2374	2785	−411	Relegation to LEB Oro

Source: ACB
(R) Relegated

=== Positions by round ===
The table lists the positions of teams after completion of each round. In italics, the team did not play any game in that round.

Team \ Round	1	2	3	4	5	6	7	8	9	10	11	12	13	14	15	16	17	18	19	20	21	22	23	24	25	26	27	28	29	30	31	32	33	34
Real Madrid	4	1	3	3	1	1	2	1	1	1	1	1	1	1	1	1	1	1	1	1	1	2	3	2	3	3	2	1	1	1	1	1	1	1
Baskonia	1	2	6	4	3	5	4	6	5	8	6	5	5	5	5	5	5	4	5	5	5	4	2	4	4	5	4	5	4	3	3	4	3	2
Valencia Basket	3	11	8	6	6	3	5	4	6	4	4	3	2	3	3	3	2	5	4	3	3	3	4	3	2	1	3	2	2	2	2	2	2	3
Unicaja	13	16	10	9	8	7	8	7	7	5	5	6	6	6	6	7	7	6	6	6	6	6	6	5	7	7	7	7	5	7	5	5	4	4
Iberostar Tenerife	5	3	1	1	2	2	1	3	3	2	3	2	4	4	4	4	3	2	2	2	2	1	1	1	1	2	1	3	3	4	6	6	5	5
FC Barcelona Lassa	7	6	5	7	5	4	3	2	2	3	2	4	3	2	2	2	4	3	3	4	4	5	5	6	5	4	6	4	6	4	4	3	6	6
Herbalife Gran Canaria	14	14	15	16	14	11	9	9	9	9	9	9	8	8	7	6	6	8	8	7	7	7	7	7	6	6	5	6	7	6	7	7	7	7
MoraBanc Andorra	9	5	4	5	7	8	7	5	4	7	8	7	7	7	8	8	8	7	7	8	8	9	8	8	8	8	8	8	8	8	8	8	8	8
UCAM Murcia	8	12	7	8	11	13	15	15	12	13	13	15	12	13	12	12	13	14	13	14	14	12	13	12	12	11	11	12	11	10	10	10	10	9
RETAbet Bilbao Basket	6	4	2	2	4	6	6	8	8	6	7	8	9	9	9	9	9	10	9	9	9	8	9	9	9	9	9	9	9	9	9	9	9	10
Movistar Estudiantes	16	13	11	10	10	10	11	10	10	10	10	10	13	14	14	13	14	12	11	11	11	10	11	11	10	12	12	11	10	11	12	11	11	11
Montakit Fuenlabrada	12	8	9	13	16	17	16	16	16	16	16	14	11	10	10	11	10	9	10	10	10	11	10	10	11	10	10	10	12	12	11	12	12	12
Rio Natura Monbus	17	17	17	15	15	16	13	13	15	14	12	12	14	15	15	16	16	16	16	16	16	16	16	16	16	16	14	14	13	15	15	14	13	13
Divina Seguros Joventut	10	15	16	17	17	15	14	14	14	15	15	16	16	16	16	15	15	15	15	15	15	15	15	15	15	14	15	13	14	13	13	13	14	14
Tecnyconta Zaragoza	15	10	12	12	9	12	12	12	13	11	11	11	10	11	13	14	12	13	14	12	12	13	14	13	14	15	16	16	15	14	14	15	15	15
Real Betis Energía Plus	2	7	13	11	12	9	10	11	11	12	14	13	15	12	11	10	11	11	12	13	13	14	12	14	13	13	13	15	16	16	16	16	16	16
ICL Manresa	11	9	14	14	13	14	17	17	17	17	17	17	17	17	17	17	17	17	17	17	17	17	17	17	17	17	17	17	17	17	17	17	17	17

Source: ACB

=== Results ===
Home \ Away	BKN	CJB	FCB	HGC	IBT	ICL	FUE	MBA	MOV	BET	RMB	RBB	RNM	TCZ	UCM	UNI	VLC
Baskonia		81–45	84–92	95–90	72–73	82–69	103–66	95–77	82–77	79–75	77–62	84–63	87–86	101–92	87–75	75–79	71–63
Divina Seguros Joventut	83–90		56–76	86–72	73–78	100–66	65–82	74–59	77–71	88–94	78–81	82–55	82–83	84–80	86–84	82–79	86–84
FC Barcelona Lassa	98–92	79–77		79–78	65–73	92–72	87–53	102–65	92–80	80–58	85–75	68–76	100–76	91–88	73–70	89–70	94–82
Herbalife Gran Canaria	74–61	98–80	95–82		81–92	95–76	111–60	64–90	104–86	82–62	68–76	86–80	91–57	86–82	74–64	76–71	75–84
Iberostar Tenerife	72–76	89–75	71–60	60–70		84–51	96–50	89–72	81–72	96–74	75–64	80–76	70–55	65–54	94–80	72–73	62–65
ICL Manresa	87–82	81–85	50–56	70–102	74–79		82–90	91–93	77–75	91–86	80–91	79–86	78–82	94–91	63–73	70–89	73–94
Montakit Fuenlabrada	69–77	94–88	75–78	75–72	61–85	84–64		85–73	103–97	67–72	99–101	80–89	63–75	93–80	86–83	85–98	73–68
MoraBanc Andorra	82–91	92–73	87–80	97–89	85–82	85–77	96–78		87–83	95–69	86–88	85–81	91–87	100–92	88–72	92–87	89–84
Movistar Estudiantes	70–76	83–71	83–81	78–86	63–82	95–90	86–74	87–85		82–95	88–96	87–83	81–73	94–78	109–84	76–87	68–87
Real Betis Energía Plus	60–94	57–71	72–89	70–89	76–82	75–80	76–59	73–78	73–77		76–75	73–85	79–74	87–84	77–103	76–68	85–90
Real Madrid	86–82	95–70	76–75	81–93	86–59	96–70	92–76	96–92	79–72	87–76		104–76	106–59	94–68	93–86	101–90	85–71
RETAbet Bilbao Basket	64–75	83–70	92–79	68–82	81–91	91–76	82–76	81–67	79–74	82–85	77–85		85–90	81–77	71–82	63–74	88–75
Rio Natura Monbus	76–92	80–67	71–76	87–90	81–82	89–75	72–91	86–84	64–73	88–67	90–83	77–83		80–63	78–86	70–78	75–92
Tecnyconta Zaragoza	88–99	71–69	75–86	57–102	71–59	87–77	80–75	90–74	85–90	102–99	78–98	69–75	85–59		95–77	77–82	68–80
UCAM Murcia	71–92	67–65	83–99	57–76	79–68	85–61	99–62	77–53	100–91	92–80	61–89	97–71	74–76	88–80		88–95	75–78
Unicaja	82–72	77–74	95–89	89–78	88–67	91–75	89–73	93–69	66–78	98–89	82–78	85–64	87–69	71–80	88–76		83–91
Valencia Basket	99–91	77–72	76–59	86–81	74–58	100–55	101–86	88–62	93–85	66–56	75–94	83–61	85–74	100–67	67–70	81–77	

Source: ACB
Legend: Blue = home team win; Red = away team win.

== Playoffs ==
Quarterfinals
1 Real Madrid	107	77	95
8 MoraBanc Andorra	76	89	84
4 Unicaja	79	67	71
5 Iberostar Tenerife	65	73	61
2 Baskonia	71	79	73
7 Herbalife Gran Canaria	59	94	71
3 Valencia Basket	83	79	67
6 FC Barcelona Lassa	61	91	64

Semifinals
1 Real Madrid	71	101	76
4 Unicaja	68	72	73
2 Baskonia	82	90	69	77
3 Valencia Basket	83	70	75	85

Finals
1 Real Madrid	87	79	64	76
3 Valencia Basket	81	86	81	87

== Final standings ==
Pos	Team	Pld	W	L	Qualification or relegation
1	Valencia Basket (C)	43	31	12	Qualification to EuroLeague (Note: Real Madrid, Baskonia and FC Barcelona Lassa were already qualified to EuroLeague.)
2	Real Madrid	42	31	11	Qualification to EuroLeague
3	Baskonia	39	26	13	Qualification to EuroLeague
4	Unicaja (Note: Unicaja qualified to EuroLeague by winning the EuroCup.)	38	24	14	Qualification to EuroLeague
5	Iberostar Tenerife (Note: Iberostar Tenerife qualified to Champions League regular season by winning the Champions League.)	35	23	12	Qualification to Champions League regular season
6	FC Barcelona Lassa	35	23	12	Qualification to EuroLeague
7	Herbalife Gran Canaria	35	22	13	Qualification to EuroCup
8	MoraBanc Andorra	35	17	18	Qualification to EuroCup
9	UCAM Murcia	32	14	18	Qualification to Champions League regular season
10	RETAbet Bilbao Basket	32	14	18	Qualification to EuroCup
11	Movistar Estudiantes	32	13	19	Qualification to Champions League third qualifying round
12	Montakit Fuenlabrada	32	12	20	
13	Rio Natura Monbus Obradoiro	32	11	21	
14	Divina Seguros Joventut	32	11	21	Qualification to Champions League first qualifying round
15	Tecnyconta Zaragoza	32	9	23	
16	Real Betis Energía Plus (R)	32	9	23	Relegation to LEB Oro
17	ICL Manresa (R)	32	5	27	Relegation to LEB Oro

Source: ACB
(C) Champions; (R) Relegated

== Attendances ==
Attendances include playoff games:

Pos	Team	Total	High	Low	Average	Change
1	Baskonia	195,169	14,316	7,382	9,758	−1.6%
2	Real Madrid	199,577	12,448	6,783	9,072	+1.1%
3	RETAbet Bilbao Basket	139,322	9,833	7,792	8,708	−3.9%
4	Movistar Estudiantes	133,696	13,570	3,299	8,356	−3.4%
5	Valencia Basket	179,500	8,500	7,200	8,159	−0.6%
6	Tecnyconta Zaragoza	119,466	10,052	6,276	7,467	+4.5%
7	Unicaja	135,207	10,473	3,891	7,116	−3.1%
8	Herbalife Gran Canaria	109,883	8,661	4,283	6,464	−4.4%
9	UCAM Murcia	90,185	7,500	4,631	5,637	−5.0%
10	Rio Natura Monbus Obradoiro	81,064	5,760	4,463	5,067	−3.7%
11	Divina Seguros Joventut	79,606	7,946	3,625	4,975	+0.7%
12	Montakit Fuenlabrada	78,754	5,700	3,230	4,911	−5.3%
13	Real Betis Energía Plus	78,174	7,112	2,793	4,886	+7.5%
14	Iberostar Tenerife	76,859	5,177	3,747	4,521	+12.3%
15	FC Barcelona Lassa	72,623	6,581	3,117	4,272	−15.8%
16	MoraBanc Andorra	71,869	4,873	3,423	4,228	+4.7%
17	ICL Manresa	63,760	4,420	3,530	3,985	−8.0%
	League total	1,904,534	14,316	2,793	6,456	+1.1%

Source: ACB

== Awards ==
All official awards of the 2016–17 ACB season.

=== MVP ===
Pos.	Player	Team
PG	(Spain) Sergio Llull	Real Madrid

=== Finals MVP ===
Pos.	Player	Team
C	(Montenegro) Bojan Dubljević	Valencia Basket

=== All-ACB Teams ===
Pos.	First Team		Second Team	
Pos.	Player	Team	Player	Team
PG	(Spain) Sergio Llull	Real Madrid	(United States) Shane Larkin	Baskonia
SG	(France) Edwin Jackson	Movistar Estudiantes	(Argentina) Facundo Campazzo	UCAM Murcia
SF	(Hungary) Ádám Hanga	Baskonia	(Serbia) Nemanja Nedović	Unicaja
PF	(Montenegro) Bojan Dubljević	Valencia Basket	(Slovenia) Anthony Randolph	Real Madrid
C	(Georgia (country)) Giorgi Shermadini	MoraBanc Andorra	(Croatia) Ante Tomić	FC Barcelona Lassa

=== Best Young Player Award ===
Pos.	Player	Team
PG	(Slovenia) Luka Dončić	Real Madrid

=== Best All-Young Team ===
Pos.	Player	Team
PG	(Slovenia) Luka Dončić	Real Madrid
SG	(Spain) Alberto Abalde	Divina Seguros Joventut
SF	(Latvia) Rolands Šmits	Montakit Fuenlabrada
PF	(Bulgaria) Sasha Vezenkov	FC Barcelona Lassa
C	(Latvia) Anžejs Pasečņiks	Herbalife Gran Canaria

=== Sportium Award to the Best Three-Point Shooter ===
Pos.	Player	Team
SG	(Lithuania) Martynas Gecevičius	Tecnyconta Zaragoza

=== KIA Most Spectacular Player ===
Pos.	Player	Team
PG	(Argentina) Facundo Campazzo	UCAM Murcia

=== Best Coach ===
Coach	Team
(Spain) Txus Vidorreta	Iberostar Tenerife

=== Player of the week ===
Date	Player	Team	PIR
1	(Croatia) Luka Žorić	Real Betis Energía Plus	30
2	(Czech Republic) Patrik Auda	ICL Manresa	27
2	(Spain) Sergio Llull	Real Madrid	27
3	(United States) Davin White	Iberostar Tenerife	38
4	(Serbia) Nemanja Nedović	Unicaja	29
5	(Croatia) Ante Tomić	FC Barcelona Lassa	27
5	(Germany) Johannes Voigtmann	Baskonia	27
6	(Spain) Albert Sàbat	Divina Seguros Joventut	25
7	(Croatia) Ante Tomić (2)	FC Barcelona Lassa	33
8	(Serbia) Stevan Jelovac	Tecnyconta Zaragoza	29
9	(Spain) Álex Mumbrú	RETAbet Bilbao Basket	36
10	(Spain) Sergio Llull (2)	Real Madrid	37
11	(Slovenia) Luka Dončić	Real Madrid	34
12	(United States) Trent Lockett	Real Betis Energía Plus	33
13	(Argentina) Facundo Campazzo	UCAM Murcia	36
14	(Montenegro) Tyrese Rice	FC Barcelona Lassa	29
15	(Brazil) Vítor Faverani	UCAM Murcia	31
16	(Mexico) Gustavo Ayón	Real Madrid	30
17	(Georgia (country)) Giorgi Shermadini	MoraBanc Andorra	33
18	(France) Edwin Jackson	Movistar Estudiantes	44
19	(Canada) Aaron Doornekamp	Iberostar Tenerife	28
20	(United States) Shane Larkin	Baskonia	31
21	(Hungary) Ádám Hanga	Baskonia	34
22	(United States) Shane Larkin (2)	Baskonia	36
23	(Montenegro) Blagota Sekulić	Montakit Fuenlabrada	31
24	(Montenegro) Bojan Dubljević	Valencia Basket	28
25	(Georgia (country)) Giorgi Shermadini (2)	MoraBanc Andorra	41
26	(Spain) Sergio Llull (3)	Real Madrid	32
27	(Spain) Felipe Reyes	Real Madrid	40
28	(Slovenia) Luka Dončić (2)	Real Madrid	32
29	(United States) Kyle Fogg	Unicaja	30
30	(Croatia) Ante Tomić (3)	FC Barcelona Lassa	32
31	(Montenegro) Bojan Dubljević (2)	Valencia Basket	38
32	(Georgia (country)) Giorgi Shermadini (3)	MoraBanc Andorra	32
33	(Spain) Sergio Llull (4)	Real Madrid	33
34	(Hungary) Ádám Hanga (2)	Baskonia	28

=== Player of the month ===
Month	Week	Player	Team	PIR	Ref
October	1–6	(Kosovo) Scott Bamforth	RETAbet Bilbao Basket	22.8	
November	7–10	(Serbia) Stevan Jelovac	Tecnyconta Zaragoza	27.3	
December	11–15	(Croatia) Ante Tomić	FC Barcelona Lassa	22.4	
January	16–19	(Georgia (country)) Giorgi Shermadini	Morabanc Andorra	27.7	
February	20–22	(United States) Shane Larkin	Baskonia	33.5	
March	23–26	(Georgia (country)) Giorgi Shermadini (2)	Morabanc Andorra	25.7	
April	27–31	(Montenegro) Bojan Dubljević	Valencia Basket	20.6	
May	32–34	(Georgia (country)) Giorgi Shermadini (3)	Morabanc Andorra	24.7	

== ACB clubs in European competitions ==
Team	Competition	Progress
Real Madrid	EuroLeague	4th (Final Four)
Baskonia	EuroLeague	7th (Playoffs)
FC Barcelona Lassa	EuroLeague	11th (Regular season)
Unicaja	EuroCup	Champions
Valencia Basket	EuroCup	Runners-up
Herbalife Gran Canaria	EuroCup	Quarterfinals
Montakit Fuenlabrada	EuroCup	Top 16
UCAM Murcia	EuroCup	Top 16
RETAbet Bilbao Basket	EuroCup	Regular season
Iberostar Tenerife	Champions League	Champions
