= 2020–21 Basketball Champions League =

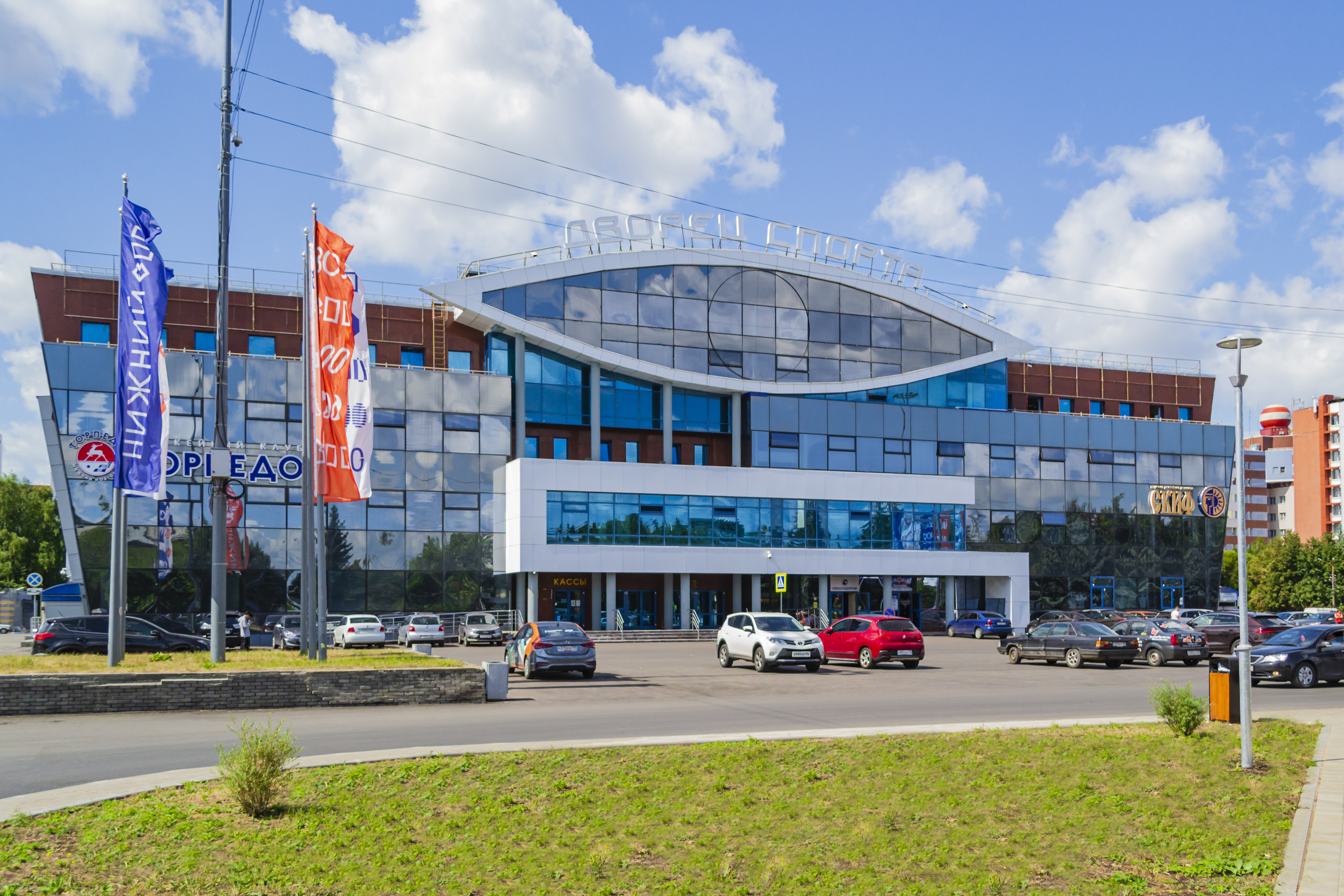
- The Trade Union Sport Palace in Nizhny Novgorod hosted the Final Eight
- Season: 2020–21
- Dates: 15 September 2020 – 9 May 2021
- Teams: 32 (regular season); 44 (all rounds)

Regular season
- Season MVP: (United States) Bonzie Colson

Finals
- Champions: (Spain) San Pablo Burgos (2nd title)
- Runners-up: (Turkey) Pınar Karşıyaka
- Third place: (Spain) Casademont Zaragoza
- Fourth place: (France) SIG Strasbourg
- Finals MVP: (Brazil) Vítor Benite

Awards
- Best Coach: (Serbia) Zoran Lukić
- Best Young Player: (France) Yoan Makoundou

Statistical leaders
Points	(United States) Bonzie Colson	18.2
Rebounds	(United States) Michale Kyser	7.8
Assists	(Italy) Marco Spissu	6.9
Index Rating	(United States) Raymar Morgan	20.6

Seasons
- ← 2019–20 2021–22 →

The 2020–21 Basketball Champions League was the 5th season of the Basketball Champions League (BCL), the premier European-wide professional basketball competition for clubs launched and managed by FIBA. The season began on 15 September 2020 and ended on 9 May 2021. It featured 12 domestic champions while four wild cards were allocated for first time.

San Pablo Burgos won its second consecutive championship, after defeating Pınar Karşıyaka in the final in Nizhny Novgorod. As champions, they qualified for the 2022 FIBA Intercontinental Cup.

== Teams ==
=== Team allocation ===
44 teams played in the 2020–21 Basketball Champions League (28 teams directly qualify for the group competition, while 16 teams play 2 qualifying rounds for the remaining 4 places in the group stage).

- Abd: Abandoned season because of the COVID-19 pandemic
- 1st, 2nd, etc.: Place in the domestic competition
- CLR: Teams qualified based on their Basketball Champions League rankings
- WC: Wild card

Qualified teams for 2020–21 Basketball Champions League (by entry round)
Regular season
(Turkey) Pınar Karşıyaka (Abd-2nd)	(France) Cholet (Abd-6th)	(Italy) Happy Casa Brindisi (Abd-5th)	(Czech Republic) ERA Nymburk (Abd-1st)
(Turkey) Galatasaray Doga Sigorta (Abd-3rd)	(France) Limoges CSP (Abd-8th)	(Italy) Fortitudo Bologna (Abd-8th)^{WC}	(Germany) Brose Bamberg (5th)
(Turkey) Tofaş (Abd-5th)	(Spain) San Pablo Burgos (4th)	(Greece) AEK (Abd-2nd)	(Hungary) Falco Vulcano Szombathely (Abd-1st)
(Turkey) Darüşşafaka Tekfen (Abd-6th)^{WC}	(Spain) Casademont Zaragoza (6th)	(Greece) Peristeri (Abd-3rd)	(Latvia) VEF Riga (Abd-1st)
(Turkey) Türk Telekom (BCL QF)^{WC}	(Spain) Iberostar Tenerife (7th)	(Israel) Hapoel Bank Yahav Jerusalem (3rd)	(Lithuania) Rytas (Abd-2nd)
(France) JDA Dijon (CLR)	(Spain) RETAbet Bilbao (8th)^{WC}	(Israel) Hapoel Holon (5th)	(Poland) Start Lublin (Abd-2nd)
(France) SIG Strasbourg (CLR)	(Italy) Dinamo Banco di Sardegna Sassari (Abd-2nd)	(Belgium) Filou Oostende (Abd-1st)	(Russia) Nizhny Novgorod (BCL R16)
Qualifying rounds
(Belgium) Belfius Mons-Hainaut (Abd-2nd)	(Cyprus) Keravnos (Abd-1st)	(Israel) Hapoel Tel Aviv (8th)	(Portugal) Sporting CP (Abd-1st)
(Belarus) Tsmoki-Minsk	(Denmark) Bakken Bears (Abd-1st)	(Lithuania) Neptūnas (Abd-4th)	(Romania) U-BT Cluj-Napoca (Abd-1st)
(Bosnia and Herzegovina) Igokea (Abd-1st)	(United Kingdom) London Lions (Abd-2nd)	(Netherlands) Donar (Abd-2nd)	(Switzerland) Fribourg Olympic (Abd-1st)
(Bulgaria) Balkan (Abd-1st)	(Greece) Iraklis (Abd-7th)	(Poland) Anwil Włocławek (Abd-3rd)	(Ukraine) Dnipro (Abd-1st)

Notes

1. France (FRA): The LNB ruled the 2019–20 Pro A season void without a classification. As a result, the BCL ruled that teams from France were selected on their BCL club rankings. JDA Dijon and SIG Strasbourg qualified as such.
2. Latvia (LAT): VEF Rīga qualified as the highest-ranked Latvian team of the Latvian–Estonian League, because the Latvian championship did not start due to the COVID-19 pandemic.

== Referees ==
Referees of the 2020–21 season
(Austria) Goran Sljivić; (Belarus) Andrei Sharapa; (Belgium) Geert Jacobs; (Bosnia and Herzegovina) Ademir Zurapović; (Bulgaria) Martin Horozov; (Bulgaria) Ventsislav Velikov; (Croatia) Josip Jurčević; (Croatia) Martin Vulić; (Cyprus) Ilias Kounelles; (Czech Republic) Petr Hrůša; (Czech Republic) Ivor Matějek; (Estonia) Mihkel Männiste; (Estonia) Tanel Suslov; (France) Thomas Bissuel; (France) Alexandre Deman; (France) Nicolas Maestre; (France) Valentin Oliot; (France) Yohan Rosso; (France) Eddie Viator; (Germany) Steve Bittner; (Germany) Carsten Straube; (Greece) Georgios Poursanidis; (Israel) Erez Gurion	(Italy) Beniamino Attard; (Italy) Lorenzo Baldini; (Italy) Valerio Grigioni; (Italy) Saverio Lanzarini; (Italy) Manuel Mazzoni; (Italy) Tolga Şahin; (Latvia) Andris Aunkrogers; (Latvia) Mārtiņš Kozlovskis; (Latvia) Oskars Lucis; (Latvia) Gatis Saliņš; (Lithuania) Gvidas Gedvilas; (Lithuania) Tomas Jasevičius; (Lithuania) Vilius Mačiulaitis; (Lithuania) Gintaras Mačiulis; (Lithuania) Gintaras Vitkauskas; (Montenegro) Zdravko Rutešić; (Montenegro) Radomir Vojinović; (North Macedonia) Igor Mitrovski; (Poland) Janusz Calik; (Poland) Wojciech Liszka; (Poland) Michał Proc; (Poland) Dariusz Zapolski; (Portugal) Paulo Marques	(Romania) Marius Ciulin; (Russia) Sergei Beliakov; (Russia) Alexey Davydov; (Serbia) Aleksandar Glišić; (Serbia) Vladimir Jevtović; (Serbia) Siniša Prpa; (Slovakia) Marek Kúkelčík; (Slovakia) Zdenko Tomašovič; (Slovenia) Boris Krejić; (Slovenia) Blaž Zupančič; (Spain) Fernando Calatrava; (Spain) Luis Castillo; (Spain) Antonio Conde; (Sweden) Apostolos Kalpakas; (Turkey) Kerem Baki; (Turkey) Mehmet Karabilecen; (Turkey) Can Mavisu; (Turkey) Mehmet Şahin; (Turkey) Özlem Yalman; (Turkey) Yener Yılmaz; (Turkey) Zafer Yılmaz; (Ukraine) Sergiy Zashchuk

== Round and draw dates ==
The schedule of the competition was as follows. On December 3, the Basketball Champions League Board has approved a change of format for the 2020-21 Play-Offs and Finals.

Schedule for 2020–21 Basketball Champions League
Phase	Round		Draw date	Round date
Qualifying rounds	First qualifying round (Semifinals)		15 July 2020	22–23 September 2020
Qualifying rounds	Second qualifying round (Finals)		15 July 2020	24–25 September 2020
Regular season	Round 1	Groups A–D	15 July 2020	20–21 October 2020
Regular season	Round 1	Groups E–H	15 July 2020	27–28 October 2020
Regular season	Round 2	Groups A–D	15 July 2020	3–4 November 2020
Regular season	Round 2	Groups E–H	15 July 2020	10–11 November 2020
Regular season	Round 3	Groups A–D	15 July 2020	17–18 November 2020
Regular season	Round 3	Groups E–H	15 July 2020	8–9 December 2020
Regular season	Round 4	Groups A–D	15 July 2020	15–16 December 2020
Regular season	Round 4	Groups E–H	15 July 2020	22–23 December 2020
Regular season	Round 5	Groups A–D	15 July 2020	5–6 January 2021
Regular season	Round 5	Groups E–H	15 July 2020	12–13 January 2021
Regular season	Round 6	Groups A–D	15 July 2020	19–20 January 2021
Regular season	Round 6	Groups E–H	15 July 2020	26–27 January 2021
Play-offs	Round 1		2 February 2021	2–3 March 2021
Play-offs	Round 2		2 February 2021	9–10 March 2021
Play-offs	Round 3		2 February 2021	16–17 March 2021
Play-offs	Round 4		2 February 2021	23–24 March 2021
Play-offs	Round 5		2 February 2021	30–31 March 2021
Play-offs	Round 6		2 February 2021	6–7 April 2021
Final Eight	Quarterfinals		16 April 2021	6–7 May 2021
Final Eight	Semifinals		16 April 2021	8 May 2021
Final Eight	Final		16 April 2021	9 May 2021

== Qualifying rounds ==
=== Draw ===
The 16 teams that entered in the first round were divided into four pots based firstly on the competition's club ranking and, for clubs that have not yet participated in the competition, on the country ranking.

For the first qualification round (QR1), teams from Pot 3 were drawn against teams from Pot 2, and teams from Pot 4 faced teams from Pot 1. Clubs from Pot 1 and 2 were seeded, and played the second leg at home. Games were played on September 15–18. The eight winners then qualified for the second qualification round (QR2).

For the second round (QR2), the winners of Pot 3 and Pot 2 faced the winners of Pot 4 and Pot 1. The winners from Pot 4 and Pot 1 were seeded, and played the second leg at home. Games were played on September 22–25. The four winners then qualified for the 2020–21 Basketball Champions League regular reason and joined the 28 directly qualified teams in the main draw.

=== Change of Qualifying format ===
On August 25, 2020, it was announced, in order to protect the health and guarantee the safety of players, coaches and officials, but also to safeguard a fair competition, and to properly organize game operations, the decision has been taken to modify the competition system from home-away games, to a tournament format, with single games for each Qualification Round.

Four tournaments took place, each consisting of two semifinals games and of one final game, where the semifinals were played as the BCL qualification round 1 and the final as the BCL qualification round 2. These Qualification tournaments took place in two different locations:

- Group A and B: Tassos Papadopoulos Eleftheria Indoor Hall at Nicosia, Cyprus.
- Group C and D: Arena Botevgrad at Botevgrad, Bulgaria.

=== Draw pots ===
Pot 1
Team	Pts
(Lithuania) Neptūnas	69
(Poland) Anwil Włocławek	28
(Switzerland) Fribourg Olympic	13
(Netherlands) Donar	7

Pot 2
Team	Pts
(Belarus) Tsmoki-Minsk	6
(Denmark) Bakken Bears	5
(Romania) U-BT Cluj-Napoca	4
(Cyprus) Keravnos	3

Pot 3
Team	Pts
(Bulgaria) Balkan	1
(Israel) Hapoel Tel Aviv	1
(Bosnia and Herzegovina) Igokea	1*
(Greece) Iraklis	106.42^{†}

Pot 4
Team	Pts
(Belgium) Belfius Mons-Hainaut	66.83^{†}
(Ukraine) Dnipro	15.00^{†}
(Portugal) Sporting CP	6.00^{†}
(United Kingdom) London Lions	1.00^{†}

* Example of 1 point for Igokea from 2016 to 2017 season means that the FIBA's "last three season points" rule applies to the last (three) BCL seasons of the particular club, not the last three BCL seasons in general.

=== Results ===
==== Qualification Group A ====
Semifinals were played on 23 September 2020 and Final took place on 25 September 2020 at Tassos Papadopoulos Eleftheria Indoor Hall in Nicosia, Cyprus.

Semifinals
23 September
(Poland) Anwil Włocławek	69
(Belgium) Belfius Mons-Hainaut	81
23 September
(Denmark) Bakken Bears	91
(Israel) Hapoel Tel Aviv	71

Final
25 September
(Belgium) Belfius Mons-Hainaut	71
(Denmark) Bakken Bears	86

==== Qualification Group B ====
Semifinals were played on 22 September 2020 and Final took place on 24 September 2020 at Tassos Papadopoulos Eleftheria Indoor Hall in Nicosia, Cyprus.

Semifinals
22 September
(Cyprus) Keravnos (OT)	96
(Greece) Iraklis	94
22 September
(Netherlands) Donar	88
(Ukraine) Dnipro	53

Final
24 September
(Cyprus) Keravnos	60
(Netherlands) Donar	57

==== Qualification Group C ====
Semifinals were played on 23 September 2020 and Final took place on 25 September 2020 at Arena Botevgrad in Botevgrad, Bulgaria.

Semifinals
23 September
(Romania) U-BT Cluj-Napoca	75
(Bosnia and Herzegovina) Igokea	82
23 September
(Switzerland) Fribourg Olympic	78
(Portugal) Sporting CP	84

Final
25 September
(Bosnia and Herzegovina) Igokea	70
(Portugal) Sporting CP	64

==== Qualification Group D ====
Semifinals were played on 22 September 2020 and Final took place on 24 September 2020 at Arena Botevgrad in Botevgrad, Bulgaria.

Semifinals
22 September
(Belarus) Tsmoki-Minsk	73
(Bulgaria) Balkan	65
22 September
(Lithuania) Neptūnas	77
(United Kingdom) London Lions	73

Final
24 September
(Belarus) Tsmoki-Minsk	69
(Lithuania) Neptūnas	59

== Regular season ==
=== Draw ===
The 28 teams that entered in the regular season directly were divided into seven pots based firstly on the club ranking and, for clubs that have not yet participated in the competition, on the country ranking. Eighth pot is reserved for winners of qualifying rounds.

Initially, teams were divided into groups of eight teams. However, due to the COVID-19 pandemic, groups were split with the aim to the reduce the number of games and to make easier to play possible postponed matches.

Pot 1
Team	Pts
(Greece) AEK	119
(Spain) Iberostar Tenerife	119
(Czech Republic) ERA Nymburk	83
(Israel) Hapoel Jerusalem	79

Pot 5
Team	Pts
(Hungary) Falco Szombathely	17
(Italy) Happy Casa Brindisi	15
(Latvia) VEF Riga	7
(Spain) RETAbet Bilbao	131.00^{†}

Pot 2
Team	Pts
(France) Strasbourg	68
(Belgium) Filou Oostende	64
(Russia) Nizhny Novgorod	61
(Germany) Brose Bamberg	60

Pot 6
Team	Pts
(France) Cholet	110.58^{†}
(France) Limoges CSP	110.58^{†}
(Turkey) Galatasaray	107.50^{†}
(Turkey) Tofaş	107.50^{†}

Pot 3
Team	Pts
(Italy) Dinamo Sassari	51
(Israel) Hapoel Holon	47
(France) JDA Dijon	43
(Turkey) Türk Telekom	36

Pot 7
Team	Pts
(Turkey) Darüşşafaka Tekfen	107.50^{†}
(Italy) Fortitudo Bologna	95.00^{†}
(Lithuania) Rytas	74.33^{†}
(Poland) Start Lublin	44.67^{†}

Pot 4
Team	Pts
(Turkey) Pınar Karşıyaka	35
(Spain) Casademont Zaragoza	34
(Spain) San Pablo Burgos	30
(Greece) Peristeri	26

Pot 8
Team
(Denmark) Bakken Bears
(Cyprus) Keravnos
(Bosnia and Herzegovina) Igokea
(Belarus) Tsmoki-Minsk

Notes

^† Indicates teams with no club points, therefore using the country points as a tiebreaker.

=== Group A ===
Pos	Team	Pld	W	L	PF	PA	PD	Pts	Qualification	TFE	DIN	BAK	GAL
1	(Spain) Iberostar Tenerife	6	4	2	552	507	+45	10	Advance to Playoffs	—	115–85	98–73	85–72
2	(Italy) Dinamo Sassari	6	4	2	524	529	−5	10	Advance to Playoffs	92–72	—	71–93	93–84
3	(Denmark) Bakken Bears	6	3	3	523	507	+16	9		96–78	84–91	—	96–78
4	(Turkey) Galatasaray	6	1	5	495	551	−56	7		89–104	81–92	91–81	—

Source: Champions League
Legend: Blue = home team win; Red = away team win.

=== Group B ===
Pos	Team	Pld	W	L	PF	PA	PD	Pts	Qualification	TOF	NYM	JDA	KER
1	(Turkey) Tofaş	6	4	2	529	482	+47	10	Advance to Playoffs	—	93–96	81–87	78–67
2	(Czech Republic) ERA Nymburk	6	4	2	546	473	+73	10	Advance to Playoffs	97–103	—	94–54	96–69
3	(France) JDA Dijon	6	4	2	457	449	+8	10		61–90	85–61	—	91–79
4	(Cyprus) Keravnos	6	0	6	402	530	−128	6		74–84	69–102	44–79	—

Source: Champions League
Legend: Blue = home team win; Red = away team win.

=== Group C ===
Pos	Team	Pld	W	L	PF	PA	PD	Pts	Qualification	HOL	AEK	CHO	TSM
1	(Israel) Hapoel Holon	6	4	2	479	455	+24	10	Advance to Playoffs	—	77–71	73–63	69–79
2	(Greece) AEK	6	4	2	514	492	+22	10	Advance to Playoffs	100–96	—	83–81	95–69
3	(France) Cholet	6	2	4	458	468	−10	8		71–89	79–70	—	89–71
4	(Belarus) Tsmoki-Minsk	6	2	4	462	498	−36	8		71–75	90–95	82–75	—

Source: Champions League
Legend: Blue = home team win; Red = away team win.

=== Group D ===
Pos	Team	Pld	W	L	PF	PA	PD	Pts	Qualification	ZAR	NIZ	FAL	LUB
1	(Spain) Casademont Zaragoza	6	5	1	527	504	+23	11	Advance to Playoffs	—	78–75	85–76	94–82
2	(Russia) Nizhny Novgorod	6	4	2	496	463	+33	10	Advance to Playoffs	92–98	—	73–68	78–65
3	(Hungary) Falco Szombathely	6	3	3	493	471	+22	9		94–86	88–93	—	84–75
4	(Poland) Start Lublin	6	0	6	432	510	−78	6		85–86	66–85	59–83	—

Source: Champions League
Legend: Blue = home team win; Red = away team win.

=== Group E ===
Pos	Team	Pld	W	L	PF	PA	PD	Pts	Qualification	SIG	VEF	PER	RYT
1	(France) SIG Strasbourg	6	4	2	492	466	+26	10	Advance to Playoffs	—	101–94	77–57	81–83
2	(Latvia) VEF Rīga	6	4	2	482	457	+25	10	Advance to Playoffs	75–77	—	60–57	84–60
3	(Greece) Peristeri Winmasters	6	2	4	458	462	−4	8		76–79	81–84	—	81–74
4	(Lithuania) Rytas	6	2	4	467	514	−47	8		81–77	81–85	88–106	—

Source: Champions League
Legend: Blue = home team win; Red = away team win.

=== Group F ===
Pos	Team	Pld	W	L	PF	PA	PD	Pts	Qualification	BRO	KAR	BIL	FOR
1	(Germany) Brose Bamberg	6	6	0	509	429	+80	12	Advance to Playoffs	—	83–82	90–75	83–68
2	(Turkey) Pınar Karşıyaka	6	4	2	476	441	+35	10	Advance to Playoffs	70–76	—	85–76	80–69
3	(Spain) RETAbet Bilbao	6	2	4	445	451	−6	8		71–77	72–81	—	82–54
4	(Italy) Fortitudo Bologna	6	0	6	383	492	−109	6		63–100	65–78	64–69	—

Source: Champions League
Legend: Blue = home team win; Red = away team win.

=== Group G ===
Pos	Team	Pld	W	L	PF	PA	PD	Pts	Qualification	TTE	IGO	JER	LIM
1	(Turkey) Türk Telekom	6	5	1	487	477	+10	11	Advance to Playoffs	—	94–86	98–94	76–73
2	(Bosnia and Herzegovina) Igokea	6	3	3	457	470	−13	9	Advance to Playoffs	77–66	—	75–73	76–73
3	(Israel) Hapoel Jerusalem	6	2	4	492	482	+10	8		77–78	84–68 (Note: The rescheduled game was played in Laktaši instead of Jerusalem by agreement between both teams.)	—	81–75
4	(France) Limoges CSP	6	2	4	459	466	−7	8		70–75	80–75	88–83	—

Source: Champions League
Legend: Blue = home team win; Red = away team win.

=== Group H ===
Pos	Team	Pld	W	L	PF	PA	PD	Pts	Qualification	SPB	BRI	OOS	DAR
1	(Spain) San Pablo Burgos	6	5	1	543	470	+73	11	Advance to Playoffs	—	93–71	88–73	100–70
2	(Italy) Happy Casa Brindisi	6	4	2	521	508	+13	10	Advance to Playoffs	86–90	—	93–81	92–81
3	(Belgium) Filou Oostende	6	2	4	484	517	−33	8		99–98	80–92	—	77–67
4	(Turkey) Darüşşafaka Tekfen	6	1	5	451	504	−53	7		71–74	83–87	79–74	—

Source: Champions League
Legend: Blue = home team win; Red = away team win.

== Playoffs ==
Sixteen teams advance to the Play-off phase, consisting of a new group format of four groups with four teams each.

A draw determined the new four groups (each group had respectively two teams having finished first and two teams having finished second in their regular season group) that played home and away games over the month of March. No country protection, only group protection was applied during the draw.

Clubs played six games each in a round robin system (three games home, three away), with the first two teams in each group qualifying for a Final 8 tournament that concluded the 2020–21 season. The playoffs started on March 2–3, 2021.

The draw of this second phase of the competition was conducted on February 2, at the Patrick Baumann House of Basketball.

=== Draw ===
Seeded teams (Spain) Lenovo Tenerife (Turkey) Tofaş (Israel) Hapoel Holon (Spain) Casademont Zaragoza (France) SIG Strasbourg (Germany) Brose Bamberg (Turkey) Türk Telekom (Spain) San Pablo Burgos	Non-seeded teams (Italy) Dinamo Sassari (Czech Republic) ERA Nymburk (Greece) AEK (Russia) Nizhny Novgorod (Latvia) VEF Riga (Turkey) Pınar Karşıyaka (Bosnia and Herzegovina) Igokea (Italy) Happy Casa Brindisi

=== Group I ===
Pos	Team	Pld	W	L	PF	PA	PD	Pts	Qualification	HOL	KAR	BRI	TOF
1	(Israel) Hapoel Holon	6	4	2	472	483	−11	10	Advance to Final Eight	—	63–72	81–79	71–90
2	(Turkey) Pınar Karşıyaka	6	3	3	491	471	+20	9	Advance to Final Eight	76–77	—	107–88	78–70
3	(Italy) Happy Casa Brindisi	6	3	3	503	501	+2	9		85–87	83–79	—	77–75
4	(Turkey) Tofaş	6	2	4	478	489	−11	8		81–93	90–79	72–91	—

Source: Champions League
Legend: Blue = home team win; Red = away team win.

=== Group J ===
Pos	Team	Pld	W	L	PF	PA	PD	Pts	Qualification	TFE	SPB	IGO	VEF
1	(Spain) Lenovo Tenerife	6	5	1	484	426	+58	11	Advance to Final Eight	—	89–60	80–75	77–64
2	(Spain) San Pablo Burgos	6	4	2	462	436	+26	10	Advance to Final Eight	101–79	—	83–71	76–75
3	(Bosnia and Herzegovina) Igokea	6	3	3	440	453	−13	9		62–82	77–75 (Note: The rescheduled game was played in Burgos instead of Laktaši by agreement between both teams.)	—	64–58
4	(Latvia) VEF Rīga	6	0	6	381	452	−71	6		64–77	45–67	75–91	—

Source: Champions League
Legend: Blue = home team win; Red = away team win.

=== Group K ===
Pos	Team	Pld	W	L	PF	PA	PD	Pts	Qualification	NIZ	SIG	AEK	TTE
1	(Russia) Nizhny Novgorod	6	4	2	506	457	+49	10	Advance to Final Eight	—	87–97	88–60	96–82
2	(France) SIG Strasbourg	6	3	3	491	474	+17	9	Advance to Final Eight	68–73	—	91–73	91–81
3	(Greece) AEK	6	3	3	429	468	−39	9		79–78	77–68	—	74–65
4	(Turkey) Türk Telekom	6	2	4	460	487	−27	8		71–84	83–76	78–66	—

Source: Champions League
Legend: Blue = home team win; Red = away team win.

=== Group L ===
Pos	Team	Pld	W	L	PF	PA	PD	Pts	Qualification	NYM	ZAR	BRO	DIN
1	(Czech Republic) ERA Nymburk	6	5	1	532	497	+35	11	Advance to Final Eight	—	98–78	91–87	90–89
2	(Spain) Casademont Zaragoza	6	4	2	521	522	−1	10	Advance to Final Eight	90–71	—	77–65	105–88
3	(Germany) Brose Bamberg	6	2	4	513	504	+9	8		80–91 (Note: The rescheduled game was played in Laktaši (Bosnia and Herzegovina) instead of Bamberg due to travel restrictions related to the COVID-19 pandemic between Germany and Czech Republic.)	117–76	—	92–86
4	(Italy) Dinamo Sassari	6	1	5	502	545	−43	7		73–91	83–95	83–72	—

Source: Champions League
Legend: Blue = home team win; Red = away team win.

== Final Eight ==
The concluding Final Eight tournament was played in Nizhny Novgorod, Russia, between 5 May and 9 May 2021.

=== Draw ===
Pot 1 (Czech Republic) ERA Nymburk (Israel) Hapoel Holon (Spain) Lenovo Tenerife (Russia) Nizhny Novgorod	Pot 2 (Spain) Casademont Zaragoza (Spain) San Pablo Burgos (Turkey) Pınar Karşıyaka (France) SIG Strasbourg

=== Bracket ===
Quarterfinals
6 May
(Israel) Hapoel Holon	77
(Spain) San Pablo Burgos	86
6 May
(Spain) Lenovo Tenerife	86
(France) SIG Strasbourg (OT)	88
5 May
(Russia) Nizhny Novgorod	78
(Spain) Casademont Zaragoza	86
5 May
(Czech Republic) ERA Nymburk	73
(Turkey) Pınar Karşıyaka	84

Semifinals
7 May
(Spain) San Pablo Burgos	81
(France) SIG Strasbourg	70
7 May
(Spain) Casademont Zaragoza	79
(Turkey) Pınar Karşıyaka	84

Final
9 May
(Spain) San Pablo Burgos	64
(Turkey) Pınar Karşıyaka	59
Third place
9 May
(France) SIG Strasbourg	77
(Spain) Casademont Zaragoza	89

=== Quarterfinals ===
The quarterfinals were played on 5–6 May 2021.

Team 1	Score	Team 2
Lenovo Tenerife (Spain)	86–88 OT	(France) SIG Strasbourg
Hapoel Holon (Israel)	77–86	(Spain) San Pablo Burgos
Nizhny Novgorod (Russia)	78–86	(Spain) Casademont Zaragoza
ERA Nymburk (Czech Republic)	73–84	(Turkey) Pınar Karşıyaka

=== Semifinals ===
The semifinals were played on 7 May 2021.

Team 1	Score	Team 2
San Pablo Burgos (Spain)	81–70	(France) SIG Strasbourg
Casademont Zaragoza (Spain)	79–84	(Turkey) Pınar Karşıyaka

=== Third place game ===
The third place game was played on 9 May 2021.

Team 1	Score	Team 2
Casademont Zaragoza (Spain)	89–77	(France) SIG Strasbourg

=== Final ===
The final was played on 9 May 2021.

Team 1	Score	Team 2
Pınar Karşıyaka (Turkey)	59–64	(Spain) San Pablo Burgos

== Individual awards ==
=== Season awards ===
The annual season awards were announced on 5 May.

Award	Player	Club
Most Valuable Player	(United States) Bonzie Colson	(France) SIG Strasbourg
Final Eight MVP	(Brazil) Vítor Benite	(Spain) San Pablo Burgos
Best Young Player	(France) Yoan Makoundou	(France) Cholet
Best Coach	(Serbia) Zoran Lukić	(Russia) Nizhny Novgorod

=== Star Lineup ===
First Team		Second Team	
Player	Team	Player	Team
(United States) C.J. Harris	(Israel) Hapoel Holon	(Jamaica) Dylan Ennis	(Spain) Zaragoza
(United States) Kasey Shepherd	(Russia) Nizhny Novgorod	(United States) Darius Thompson	(Italy) New Basket Brindisi
(United States) Bonzie Colson	(France) SIG Strasbourg	(Cuba) Jasiel Rivero	(Spain) San Pablo Burgos
(United States) Raymar Morgan	(Turkey) Karşıyaka	(United States) Omar Prewitt	(Czech Republic) Nymburk
(Georgia (country)) Giorgi Shermadini	(Spain) Canarias	(United States) Michale Kyser	(Latvia) VEF Rīga

=== MVP of the Month ===
Month	Player	Club	Ref.
2020
October	(United States) Steven Gray	(Greece) Peristeri	
November	(Angola) Yanick Moreira	(Greece) AEK	
December	(United States) Kyle Allman Jr.	(Latvia) VEF Rīga	
2021
January	(United States) Raymar Morgan	(Turkey) Pınar Karşıyaka	

=== Play-Offs MVP ===
Player	Club	Ref.
(United States) Kasey Shepherd	(Russia) Nizhny Novgorod	

== See also ==
- 2020–21 FIBA Europe Cup
- 2020–21 EuroLeague
- 2020–21 EuroCup Basketball
