= 2015–16 Eurocup Basketball =

- Season: 2015–16
- Duration: 13 October 2015 – 27 April 2016 (competition proper)
- Games played: 306
- Teams: 36+8 (competition proper)

Regular season
- Season MVP: (United States) Errick McCollum

Finals
- Champions: (Turkey) Galatasaray Odeabank (1st title)
- Runners-up: (France) SIG Strasbourg
- Semi-finalists: (Spain) Herbalife Gran Canaria (Italy) Dolomiti Energia Trento
- Finals MVP: (Gabon) Stéphane Lasme

Awards
- Coach of the Year: (Italy) Maurizio Buscaglia
- Rising Star: (Poland) Mateusz Ponitka

Statistical leaders
Points	(United States) Keith Langford	19.7
Rebounds	(France) Adrien Moerman	8.6
Assists	(Spain) Quino Colom	7.6
Index Rating	(United States) Errick McCollum	22.0

Records
- Biggest home win: Herbalife Gran Canaria 108–61 Hapoel Jerusalem (10 February 2016)
- Biggest away win: EWE Baskets Oldenburg 60–94 Dominion Bilbao Basket (27 October 2015)
- Highest scoring: PAOK 104–99 Avtodor Saratov (9 December 2015)
- Winning streak: 12 games Valencia Basket
- Losing streak: 9 games Krasny Oktyabr
- All statistics correct as of 27 April 2016.

The 2015–16 Eurocup Basketball season was the 14th season of Euroleague Basketball's secondary level professional club basketball tournament, and the eighth season since it was renamed from the ULEB Cup to the Eurocup.

The 2016 Eurocup Finals were played between Galatasaray Odeabank and SIG Strasbourg, and won by Galatasaray, which was their first title in a European-wide competition. As the winners of the 2015–16 Eurocup Basketball competition, Galatasaray qualified for the European top-tier level 2016–17 EuroLeague.

== Team allocation ==
A total of 44 teams from 15 countries participated in the 2015–16 Eurocup Basketball.

=== Distribution ===
The table below shows the default access list.

	Teams entering in this round	Teams advancing from previous round	Teams transferred from Euroleague
Regular season (36 teams)	3 best-placed teams from Adriatic; 3 best-placed teams from France; 3 best-placed teams from Italy; 3 best-placed teams from Germany; 3 best-placed teams from Russia; 3 best-placed teams from Spain; 2 best-placed teams from Israel; 2 best-placed teams from Lithuania; 2 best-placed teams from Turkey; 1 best-placed team from Belgium; 1 best-placed team from Czech Republic; 1 best-placed team from Finland; 1 best-placed team from Greece; 1 best-placed team from Latvia; 1 best-placed team from Poland; 1 best-placed team from Ukraine; 1 best-placed team from United Kingdom; 4 wild cards		
Last 32 (32 teams)		6 group winners from the regular season; 6 group runners-up from the regular season; 6 group third-placed teams from the regular season; 6 group fourth-placed teams from the regular season	4 fifth-placed teams from Euroleague regular season; 4 sixth-placed teams from Euroleague regular season
Knockout stage (16 teams)		8 group winners from the Last 32; 8 group runners-up from the Last 32	

=== FIBA–Euroleague Basketball controversy ===
In July 2015, VEF Rīga, PGE Turów and Juventus withdrew from the competition for join to the FIBA Europe Cup and were replaced by Proximus Spirou, Avtodor Saratov and Szolnoki Olaj. In August 2015, ČEZ Nymburk and Telenet Oostende withdrew from the competition for join to the FIBA Europe Cup after the draw of Eurocup and were replaced by EWE Baskets Oldenburg and MHP Riesen Ludwigsburg.

=== Teams ===
The labels in the parentheses show how each team qualified for the place of its starting round:

- 1st, 2nd, 3rd, etc.: League position after Playoffs
- WC: Wild card
- AV: Allocated vacancy from any withdrawal
- EL: Transferred from Euroleague
  - RS: Fifth-placed and sixth-placed teams from regular season

Last 32
(Germany) Bayern Munich (EL RS)	(France) Limoges CSP (EL RS)	(Turkey) Pınar Karşıyaka (EL RS)	(Israel) Maccabi Tel Aviv (EL RS)
(France) SIG Strasbourg (EL RS)	(Italy) EA7 Emporio Armani Milan (EL RS)	(Poland) Stelmet Zielona Góra (EL RS)	(Italy) Banco di Sardegna Sassari (EL RS)
Regular season
Conference 1		Conference 2	
(Germany) Alba Berlin (3rd)	(Spain) Valencia Basket (4th)	(Russia) Nizhny Novgorod (4th)	(Greece) PAOK (3rd)
(Germany) ratiopharm Ulm (4th)	(Spain) Dominion Bilbao Basket (5th)	(Russia) Zenit Saint Petersburg (5th)	(Greece) Aris (WC)
(Germany) Telekom Baskets Bonn (5th)	(Spain) Herbalife Gran Canaria (8th)	(Russia) UNICS (6th)	(Greece) AEK (WC)
(Germany) EWE Baskets Oldenburg (AV)	(Spain) CAI Zaragoza (WC)	(Russia) Avtodor Saratov (AV)	(Lithuania) Lietuvos rytas (2nd)
(Germany) MHP Riesen Ludwigsburg (AV)	(France) Le Mans Sarthe (3rd)	(Russia) Krasny Oktyabr (WC)	(Lithuania) Neptūnas (WC)
(Italy) Grissin Bon Reggio Emilia (2nd)	(France) SLUC Nancy (4th)	(Turkey) Banvit (6th)	(Israel) Hapoel Jerusalem (1st)
(Italy) Umana Reyer Venezia (4th)	(France) JSF Nanterre (5th)	(Turkey) Trabzonspor Medical Park (4th)	(Montenegro) Budućnost VOLI (3rd)
(Italy) Dolomiti Energia Trento (5th)	(Slovenia) Union Olimpija (5th)	(Turkey) Galatasaray Odeabank (WC)	(Romania) Steaua CSM EximBank București (WC)
(Italy) Enel Basket Brindisi (WC)	(Belgium) Proximus Spirou (AV)	(Turkey) Beşiktaş Sompo Japan (WC)	(Hungary) Szolnoki Olaj (AV)

== Round and draw dates ==
The schedule of the competition is as follows.

Phase	Round	Draw date	First leg	Second leg
Regular season	Round 1	9 July 2015	13–14 October 2015	
Regular season	Round 2	9 July 2015	20–21 October 2015	
Regular season	Round 3	9 July 2015	27–28 October 2015	
Regular season	Round 4	9 July 2015	3–4 November 2015	
Regular season	Round 5	9 July 2015	10–11 November 2015	
Regular season	Round 6	9 July 2015	17–18 November 2015	
Regular season	Round 7	9 July 2015	24–25 November 2015	
Regular season	Round 8	9 July 2015	1–2 December 2015	
Regular season	Round 9	9 July 2015	8–9 December 2015	
Regular season	Round 10	9 July 2015	15–16 December 2015	
Last 32	Round 1	9 July 2015	5–6 January 2016	
Last 32	Round 2	9 July 2015	12–13 January 2016	
Last 32	Round 3	9 July 2015	19–20 January 2016	
Last 32	Round 4	9 July 2015	26–27 January 2016	
Last 32	Round 5	9 July 2015	2–3 February 2016	
Last 32	Round 6	9 July 2015	9–10 February 2016	
Playoffs	Eighthfinals	9 July 2015	24 February 2016	1–2 March 2016
Playoffs	Quarterfinals	9 July 2015	15–16 March 2016	22–23 March 2016
Playoffs	Semifinals	9 July 2015	29–30 March 2016	6 April 2016
Playoffs	Finals	9 July 2015	22 April 2016	27 April 2016

=== Draw ===
The draw was held on 9 July 2015, 12:00 CEST, at the Mediapro Auditorium in Barcelona. The 36 teams were drawn into six groups of six, with the restriction that teams from the same country could not be drawn against each other. For this purpose, Adriatic League worked as only one country. For the draw, the teams were seeded into six pots, in accordance with the Club Ranking, based on their performance in European competitions during a three-year period and the lowest possible position that any club from that league can occupy in the draw is calculated by adding the results of the worst performing team from each league.

Conference 1

Pot 1 Team (Germany) Alba Berlin (Spain) Valencia Basket (Czech Republic) ČEZ Nymburk	Pot 2 Team (Spain) Herbalife Gran Canaria (Spain) CAI Zaragoza (Spain) Dominion Bilbao Basket	Pot 3 Team (Slovenia) Union Olimpija (Belgium) Telenet Oostende (Germany) ratiopharm Ulm
Pot 4 Team (France) JSF Nanterre (France) SLUC Nancy (France) Le Mans Sarthe	Pot 5 Team (Belgium) Proximus Spirou (Germany) Telekom Baskets Bonn (Italy) Grissin Bon Reggio Emilia	Pot 6 Team (Italy) Umana Reyer Venezia (Italy) Dolomiti Energia Trento (Italy) Enel Basket Brindisi

Conference 2

Pot 1 Team (Russia) UNICS (Turkey) Galatasaray Odeabank (Turkey) Beşiktaş Sompo Japan	Pot 2 Team (Turkey) Banvit (Russia) Nizhny Novgorod (Lithuania) Lietuvos rytas	Pot 3 Team (Turkey) Trabzonspor Medical Park (Russia) Zenit Saint Petersburg (Russia) Krasny Oktyabr
Pot 4 Team (Russia) Avtodor Saratov (Montenegro) Budućnost VOLI (Israel) Hapoel Jerusalem	Pot 5 Team (Greece) PAOK (Greece) Aris (Greece) AEK	Pot 6 Team (Lithuania) Neptūnas (Romania) Steaua CSM EximBank București (Hungary) Szolnoki Olaj

== Regular season ==
Location of teams of the 2015–16 Eurocup regular season.
Conference 1: Red: Group A; Green: Group B; Blue: Group C;
Conference 2: Yellow: Group D; Pink: Group E; Orange: Group F;

In each group, teams played against each other home-and-away in a round-robin format. The four first qualified teams advanced to the Last 32, while the fifth and the sixth-placed teams was eliminated. The rounds were 13–14 October, 20–21 October, 27–28 October, 3–4 November, 10–11 November, 17–18 November, 24–25 November, 1–2 December, 8–9 December and 15–16 December 2015.

=== Conference 1 ===
==== Group A ====
Pos	Team	Pld	W	L	PF	PA	PD	Qualification	DBB	TRE	UOL	EWE	JSF	TBB
1	(Spain) Dominion Bilbao Basket	10	8	2	856	729	+127	Advance to Last 32	—	104–91	80–83	73–68	73–76	95−80
2	(Italy) Dolomiti Energia Trento	10	7	3	875	827	+48	Advance to Last 32	75–80	—	90–77	80–69	70–55	98–96
3	(Slovenia) Union Olimpija	10	5	5	799	828	−29	Advance to Last 32	63–84	98–97	—	81–82	78−65	77–82
4	(Germany) EWE Baskets Oldenburg	10	4	6	764	820	−56	Advance to Last 32	60–94	80−93	75–77	—	84–81	77–70
5	(France) JSF Nanterre	10	4	6	772	801	−29		52–83	79–85	85–72	83–92	—	101–78
6	(Germany) Telekom Baskets Bonn	10	2	8	838	899	−61		81–90	89–96	88–93	88–77	86–95	—

Source: Eurocup Basketball

==== Group B ====
Pos	Team	Pld	W	L	PF	PA	PD	Qualification	HGC	MHP	REG	ALB	MSB	NBB
1	(Spain) Herbalife Gran Canaria	10	8	2	839	752	+87	Advance to Last 32	—	95−75	76–67	83–78	77–62	103–76
2	(Germany) MHP Riesen Ludwigsburg	10	7	3	811	732	+79	Advance to Last 32	92–89	—	65–76	79–60	90–49	84–80
3	(Italy) Grissin Bon Reggio Emilia	10	6	4	778	759	+19	Advance to Last 32	73–78	69–68	—	74–71	93–82	82–79
4	(Germany) Alba Berlin	10	5	5	774	790	−16	Advance to Last 32	84–71	79–90	82–76	—	80–86	80–79
5	(France) Le Mans Sarthe	10	3	7	721	785	−64		74–79	75–81	71–87	84–88	—	66–45
6	(Italy) Enel Basket Brindisi	10	1	9	710	815	−105		71–88	60–87	87–81	68–72	65−72	—

Source: Eurocup Basketball

==== Group C ====
Pos	Team	Pld	W	L	PF	PA	PD	Qualification	VBC	CAI	ULM	URV	SPI	SLU
1	(Spain) Valencia Basket	10	10	0	809	689	+120	Advance to Last 32	—	87–68	93–88	88–59	97–76	77−65
2	(Spain) CAI Zaragoza	10	7	3	760	757	+3	Advance to Last 32	76−84	—	69–59	82–72	80–70	75–71
3	(Germany) ratiopharm Ulm	10	4	6	804	792	+12	Advance to Last 32	79–82	81–84	—	87–68	76−77	90−73
4	(Italy) Umana Reyer Venezia	10	4	6	721	760	−39	Advance to Last 32	58–62	77−79	90−78	—	73–69	70−67
5	(Belgium) Proximus Spirou	10	3	7	731	782	−51		49−65	80−69	80−86	86–83	—	81–86
6	(France) SLUC Nancy	10	2	8	714	759	−45		71–74	76–78	76–80	62−71	67–63	—

Source: Eurocup Basketball

=== Conference 2 ===
==== Group D ====
Pos	Team	Pld	W	L	PF	PA	PD	Qualification	ARI	UNK	TRA	BAN	POD	STE
1	(Greece) Aris	10	7	3	731	701	+30	Advance to Last 32	—	76–70	78–70	72–53	75–57	70–66
2	(Russia) UNICS	10	7	3	800	722	+78	Advance to Last 32	73–74	—	78–64	78–69	91–77	94–68
3	(Turkey) Trabzonspor Medical Park	10	5	5	754	759	−5	Advance to Last 32	74–71	73–80	—	96–88	75–71	82–67
4	(Turkey) Banvit	10	5	5	770	757	+13	Advance to Last 32	96–84	79–85	71–67	—	76–68	90–60
5	(Montenegro) Budućnost VOLI	10	4	6	747	725	+22		75–56	73–63	79–82	83–70	—	89–56
6	(Romania) Steaua CSM EximBank București	10	2	8	676	814	−138		67–77	71–88	76–71	64–78	81–75	—

Source: Eurocup Basketball

==== Group E ====
Pos	Team	Pld	W	L	PF	PA	PD	Qualification	ZEN	AVT	PBC	SZO	BJK	LRY
1	(Russia) Zenit Saint Petersburg	10	8	2	820	746	+74	Advance to Last 32	—	81–88	76−66	89–64	82–58	92–84
2	(Russia) Avtodor Saratov	10	7	3	947	839	+108	Advance to Last 32	85−90	—	90–68	104–78	93−83	109–92
3	(Greece) PAOK	10	5	5	773	831	−58	Advance to Last 32	70−89	104–99	—	72−69	80–100	81–76
4	(Hungary) Szolnoki Olaj	10	4	6	763	827	−64	Advance to Last 32	75–84	83–79	78–69	—	85–67	65–89
5	(Turkey) Beşiktaş Sompo Japan	10	4	6	810	842	−32		91–67	79−103	73–75	76–67	—	92–103
6	(Lithuania) Lietuvos rytas	10	2	8	856	884	−28		65–70	81–97	81–88	98−99	87−91	—

Source: Eurocup Basketball

==== Group F ====
Pos	Team	Pld	W	L	PF	PA	PD	Qualification	GSL	NEP	NIZ	JER	AEK	OKT
1	(Turkey) Galatasaray Odeabank	10	7	3	867	789	+78	Advance to Last 32	—	76–82	87–85	87–79	89−65	103–76
2	(Lithuania) Neptūnas	10	6	4	829	807	+22	Advance to Last 32	90−94	—	82–75	87−85	80–86	99–90
3	(Russia) Nizhny Novgorod	10	6	4	801	780	+21	Advance to Last 32	81–75	78–82	—	92−71	86–79	82−74
4	(Israel) Hapoel Jerusalem	10	5	5	808	798	+10	Advance to Last 32	86–82	74−59	70–74	—	82–78	92–90
5	(Greece) AEK	10	5	5	794	812	−18		73−86	75–71	87–70	75–74	—	94−96
6	(Russia) Krasny Oktyabr	10	1	9	797	910	−113		72–88	74–97	73−78	74–95	78–82	—

Source: Eurocup Basketball

== Last 32 ==
Location of teams of the 2015–16 Eurocup Last 32.
Brown: Group G; Red: Group H; Orange: Group I; Yellow: Group J;
Green: Group K; Blue: Group L; Purple: Group M; Pink: Group N.

In each group, teams played against each other home-and-away in a round-robin format. The two first qualified teams advanced to the knockout stage, while the two last qualified teams were eliminated. The rounds were 5–6 January, 12–13 January, 19–20 January, 26–27 January, 2–3 February and 9–10 February 2016.

=== Group G ===
Pos	Team	Pld	W	L	PF	PA	PD	Qualification	BAY	BAN	DBB	ULM
1	(Germany) Bayern Munich	6	4	2	476	454	+22	Advance to Eighthfinals	—	77–62	88–90	83–69
2	(Turkey) Banvit	6	4	2	487	455	+32	Advance to Eighthfinals	83–85	—	73–65	92–72
3	(Spain) Dominion Bilbao Basket	6	3	3	483	464	+19		76–78	76–85	—	83–65
4	(Germany) ratiopharm Ulm	6	1	5	435	508	−73		74–65	80–92	75–93	—

Source: Eurocup Basketball

=== Group H ===
Pos	Team	Pld	W	L	PF	PA	PD	Qualification	HGC	SIG	AVT	JER
1	(Spain) Herbalife Gran Canaria	6	5	1	531	440	+91	Advance to Eighthfinals	—	76–85	101–77	108–61
2	(France) SIG Strasbourg	6	4	2	464	456	+8	Advance to Eighthfinals	68–79	—	77–74	75–71
3	(Russia) Avtodor Saratov	6	3	3	531	540	−9		85–92	87–80	—	105–96
4	(Israel) Hapoel Jerusalem	6	0	6	455	545	−90		64–75	69–79	94–103	—

Source: Eurocup Basketball

=== Group I ===
Pos	Team	Pld	W	L	PF	PA	PD	Qualification	EWE	LIM	VBC	PBC
1	(Germany) EWE Baskets Oldenburg	6	4	2	494	490	+4	Advance to Eighthfinals	—	92–88	89–108	83–71
2	(France) Limoges CSP	6	3	3	494	467	+27	Advance to Eighthfinals	78–87	—	82–67	79–61
3	(Spain) Valencia Basket	6	3	3	474	462	+12		77–62	72–92	—	78–62
4	(Greece) PAOK	6	2	4	425	468	−43		68–81	88–75	75–72	—

Source: Eurocup Basketball

=== Group J ===
Pos	Team	Pld	W	L	PF	PA	PD	Qualification	EA7	ALB	ARI	NEP
1	(Italy) EA7 Emporio Armani Milan	6	4	2	474	442	+32	Advance to Eighthfinals	—	91–78	95–54	79–71
2	(Germany) Alba Berlin	6	3	3	447	433	+14	Advance to Eighthfinals	83–67	—	82–67	76–62
3	(Greece) Aris	6	3	3	429	438	−9		83–68	73–63	—	84–58
4	(Lithuania) Neptūnas	6	2	4	409	446	−37		73–74	73–65	72–68	—

Source: Eurocup Basketball

=== Group K ===
Pos	Team	Pld	W	L	PF	PA	PD	Qualification	TRE	KSK	TRA	REG
1	(Italy) Dolomiti Energia Trento	6	4	2	470	467	+3	Advance to Eighthfinals	—	76–72	73–89	82–63
2	(Turkey) Pınar Karşıyaka	6	3	3	498	426	+72	Advance to Eighthfinals	79–85	—	81–68	109–66
3	(Turkey) Trabzonspor Medical Park	6	3	3	450	465	−15		92–70	43–76	—	82–76
4	(Italy) Grissin Bon Reggio Emilia	6	2	4	454	514	−60		72–84	88–81	89–76	—

Source: Eurocup Basketball

=== Group L ===
Pos	Team	Pld	W	L	PF	PA	PD	Qualification	ZEN	ZGA	MHP	URV
1	(Russia) Zenit Saint Petersburg	6	4	2	479	470	+9	Advance to Eighthfinals	—	69–73	83–80	79–72
2	(Poland) Stelmet Zielona Góra	6	3	3	458	463	−5	Advance to Eighthfinals	76–90	—	76–81	83–92
3	(Germany) MHP Riesen Ludwigsburg	6	3	3	477	468	+9		85–72	73–82	—	94–84
4	(Italy) Umana Reyer Venezia	6	2	4	461	474	−13		84–86	58–68	71–64	—

Source: Eurocup Basketball

=== Group M ===
Pos	Team	Pld	W	L	PF	PA	PD	Qualification	UNK	NIZ	MTA	UOL
1	(Russia) UNICS	6	6	0	495	449	+46	Advance to Eighthfinals	—	84–74	78–68	72–64
2	(Russia) Nizhny Novgorod	6	3	3	490	482	+8	Advance to Eighthfinals	78–80	—	83–87	81–74
3	(Israel) Maccabi Tel Aviv	6	2	4	469	494	−25		82–92	84–95	—	82–73
4	(Slovenia) Union Olimpija	6	1	5	440	469	−29		83–89	73–79	73–66	—

Source: Eurocup Basketball

=== Group N ===
Pos	Team	Pld	W	L	PF	PA	PD	Qualification	GSL	CAI	DSS	SZO
1	(Turkey) Galatasaray Odeabank	6	4	2	493	414	+79	Advance to Eighthfinals	—	103–68	87–69	87–59
2	(Spain) CAI Zaragoza	6	4	2	480	451	+29	Advance to Eighthfinals	85–68	—	87–75	88–60
3	(Italy) Banco di Sardegna Sassari	6	3	3	463	480	−17		79–74	75–72	—	90–74
4	(Hungary) Szolnoki Olaj	6	1	5	403	494	−91		54–74	70–80	86–75	—

Source: Eurocup Basketball

== Knockout stage ==
In the knockout stage, teams played against each other over two legs on a home-and-away basis, with the overall cumulative score determining the winner of a round. Thus, the score of one single game can be tied.

- The team that finished in the higher Last 32 place will be played the second game of the series at home.
- If both teams placed the same in the Last 32, the team with more Last 32 victories will be played the second game at home.
- In case of a tie in both place and victories, the team with the higher cumulative Last 32 point difference will be played the second game at home.

=== Bracket ===
Eighthfinals; February 24 – March 2
(Germany) Bayern Munich	82	84	166
(Germany) Alba Berlin	82	75	157
(Turkey) Galatasaray Odeabank	64	93	157
(Turkey) Pınar Karşıyaka	67	65	132
(Spain) Herbalife Gran Canaria	82	77	159
(France) Limoges CSP	65	78	143
(Russia) UNICS	72	54	126
(Poland) Stelmet Zielona Góra	68	71	139
(Germany) EWE Baskets Oldenburg	78	64	142
(France) SIG Strasbourg	76	93	169
(Russia) Zenit Saint Petersburg	76	89	165
(Russia) Nizhny Novgorod	102	74	176
(Italy) EA7 Emporio Armani Milan	72	79	151
(Turkey) Banvit	69	76	145
(Italy) Dolomiti Energia Trento	83	79	162
(Spain) CAI Zaragoza	85	65	150

Quarterfinals; March 15 – March 23
(Germany) Bayern Munich	99	59	158
(Turkey) Galatasaray Odeabank	89	72	161
(Spain) Herbalife Gran Canaria	93	83	176
(Poland) Stelmet Zielona Góra	82	86	168
(France) SIG Strasbourg	94	91	185
(Russia) Nizhny Novgorod	85	91	176
(Italy) EA7 Emporio Armani Milan	73	79	152
(Italy) Dolomiti Energia Trento	83	92	175

Semifinals; March 29 – April 6
(Turkey) Galatasaray Odeabank	89	81	170
(Spain) Herbalife Gran Canaria	75	94	169
(France) SIG Strasbourg	68	86	154
(Italy) Dolomiti Energia Trento	74	78	152

Finals; April 22 – April 27
(Turkey) Galatasaray Odeabank	62	78	140
(France) SIG Strasbourg	66	67	133

=== Eighthfinals ===
The first legs were played on 24 February, and the second legs were played on 1 and 2 March 2016.

Team 1	Agg.	Team 2	1st leg	2nd leg
Bayern Munich (Germany)	166–157	(Germany) Alba Berlin	82–82	84–75
Herbalife Gran Canaria (Spain)	159–143	(France) Limoges CSP	82–65	77–78
EWE Baskets Oldenburg (Germany)	142–169	(France) SIG Strasbourg	78–76	64–93
EA7 Emporio Armani Milan (Italy)	151–145	(Turkey) Banvit	72–69	79–76
Dolomiti Energia Trento (Italy)	162–150	(Spain) CAI Zaragoza	83–85	79–65
Zenit Saint Petersburg (Russia)	165–176	(Russia) Nizhny Novgorod	76–102	89–74
UNICS (Russia)	126–139	(Poland) Stelmet Zielona Góra	72–68	54–71
Galatasaray Odeabank (Turkey)	157–132	(Turkey) Pınar Karşıyaka	64–67	93–65

=== Quarterfinals ===
The first legs were played on 15 and 16 March, and the second legs were played on 22 and 23 March 2016.

Team 1	Agg.	Team 2	1st leg	2nd leg
Galatasaray Odeabank (Turkey)	161–158	(Germany) Bayern Munich	89–99	72–59
Herbalife Gran Canaria (Spain)	176–168	(Poland) Stelmet Zielona Góra	93–82	83–86
SIG Strasbourg (France)	185–176	(Russia) Nizhny Novgorod	94–85	91–91
EA7 Emporio Armani Milan (Italy)	152–175	(Italy) Dolomiti Energia Trento	73–83	79–92

=== Semifinals ===
The first legs were played on 29 and 30 March, and the second legs were played on 6 April 2016.

Team 1	Agg.	Team 2	1st leg	2nd leg
Herbalife Gran Canaria (Spain)	169–170	(Turkey) Galatasaray Odeabank	75–89	94–81
Dolomiti Energia Trento (Italy)	152–154	(France) SIG Strasbourg	74–68	78–86

=== Finals ===
The first leg was played on 22 April, and the second leg was played on 27 April 2016.

Team 1	Agg.	Team 2	1st leg	2nd leg
Galatasaray Odeabank (Turkey)	140–133	(France) SIG Strasbourg	62–66	78–67

== Individual statistics ==
=== Index Rating ===
Rank	Name	Team	Games	Index Rating	PIR
1.	(United States) Jeff Brooks	(Russia) Avtodor Saratov	13	277	21.31
2.	(United States) Keith Langford	(Russia) UNICS	16	339	21.19
3.	(United States) Errick McCollum	(Turkey) Galatasaray Odeabank	20	423	21.15

=== Points ===
Rank	Name	Team	Games	Points	PPG
1.	(United States) Keith Langford	(Russia) UNICS	16	315	19.69
2.	(United States) Ryan Toolson	(Russia) Zenit Saint Petersburg	15	278	18.53
3.	(United States) Travis Peterson	(Russia) Avtodor Saratov	16	289	18.06

=== Rebounds ===
Rank	Name	Team	Games	Rebounds	RPG
1.	(France) Adrien Moerman	(Turkey) Banvit	18	154	8.56
2.	(United States) Jon Brockman	(Germany) MHP Riesen Ludwigsburg	16	132	8.25
3.	(United States) Jeff Brooks	(Russia) Avtodor Saratov	13	107	8.23

=== Assists ===
Rank	Name	Team	Games	Assists	APG
1.	(Spain) Quino Colom	(Russia) UNICS	18	137	7.61
2.	(Russia) Dmitry Khvostov	(Russia) Nizhny Novgorod	20	134	6.70
3.	(United States) Courtney Fortson	(Turkey) Banvit	18	104	5.78

=== Other statistics ===
Category	Name	Team	Games	Stat
Steals per game	(United States) Roderick Trice	(Germany) MHP Riesen Ludwigsburg	15	2.20
Blocks per game	(Israel) D'or Fischer	(Israel) Hapoel Jerusalem	14	1.64
2PT %	(Spain) Pere Tomàs	(Spain) CAI Zaragoza	13	70.97 %
3PT %	(United States) Ryan Toolson	(Russia) Zenit Saint Petersburg	15	51.58 %
FT %	(Greece) Kostas Vasileiadis	(Greece) PAOK	13	100.00 %

=== Game highs ===
Category	Name	Team	Stat
Index Rating	(Greece) Loukas Mavrokefalidis	(Greece) AEK	55
Points	(Greece) Loukas Mavrokefalidis	(Greece) AEK	42
Rebounds	4 times		17
Assists	(United States) D. J. Cooper	(Russia) Krasny Oktyabr	14
Assists	(United States) Zabian Dowdell	(Russia) Zenit Saint Petersburg	14
Steals	(United States) Chris Kramer	(Germany) EWE Baskets Oldenburg	8
Blocks	5 times		5

== Awards ==
=== Eurocup MVP ===
Player	Team	Ref.
(United States) Errick McCollum	(Turkey) Galatasaray Odeabank	

=== Eurocup Finals MVP ===
Player	Team	Ref.
(Gabon) Stéphane Lasme	(Turkey) Galatasaray Odeabank	

=== All-Eurocup Teams ===
Position	All-Eurocup First Team		All-Eurocup Second Team		Ref
Position	Player	Club	Player	Club	Ref
G	(United States) Errick McCollum	(Turkey) Galatasaray Odeabank	(Slovenia) Kevin Pangos	(Spain) Herbalife Gran Canaria	
G	(United States) Mardy Collins	(France) SIG Strasbourg	(United States) Victor Rudd	(Russia) Nizhny Novgorod	
F	(Serbia) Vladimir Micov	(Turkey) Galatasaray Odeabank	(Poland) Mateusz Ponitka	(Poland) Stelmet Zielona Góra	
F	(Italy) Davide Pascolo	(Italy) Dolomiti Energia Trento	(United States) Julian Wright	(Italy) Dolomiti Energia Trento	
C	(Slovenia) Alen Omić	(Spain) Herbalife Gran Canaria	(Gabon) Stéphane Lasme	(Turkey) Galatasaray Odeabank	

=== Coach of the Year ===
Coach	Team	Ref.
(Italy) Maurizio Buscaglia	(Italy) Dolomiti Energia Trento	

=== Rising Star ===
Player	Team	Ref.
(Poland) Mateusz Ponitka	(Poland) Stelmet Zielona Góra	

=== Round MVP ===
Regular season

Round	Player	Team	PIR	Ref.
1	(United States) Raymar Morgan	(Germany) ratiopharm Ulm	41	
2	(Serbia) Dragan Milosavljević	(Germany) Alba Berlin	29	
3	(United States) Zabian Dowdell	(Russia) Zenit Saint Petersburg	51	
4	(Bosnia and Herzegovina) Zack Wright	(Slovenia) Union Olimpija	36	
4	(United States) Errick McCollum	(Turkey) Galatasaray Odeabank	36	
5	(Bulgaria) E. J. Rowland	(Israel) Hapoel Jerusalem	38	
5	(Greece) Loukas Mavrokefalidis	(Greece) AEK	38	
6	(Greece) Loukas Mavrokefalidis (2)	(Greece) AEK	36	
6	(Lithuania) Kšyštof Lavrinovič	(Lithuania) Lietuvos rytas	36	
7	(United States) Billy Baron	(Belgium) Proximus Spirou	36	
7	(Mexico) Paul Stoll	(Russia) Avtodor Saratov	36	
8	(United States) Tywain McKee	(France) Le Mans Sarthe	36	
9	(Spain) Quino Colom	(Russia) UNICS	38	
10	(United States) Keith Langford	(Russia) UNICS	31	

Last 32

Round	Player	Team	PIR	Ref.
1	(Spain) Quino Colom (2)	(Russia) UNICS	41	
2	(Spain) Quino Colom (3)	(Russia) UNICS	47	
3	(Gabon) Stéphane Lasme	(Turkey) Galatasaray Odeabank	35	
4	(France) Adrien Moerman	(Turkey) Banvit	38	
5	(United States) Travis Peterson	(Russia) Avtodor Saratov	33	
6	(Slovenia) Alen Omić	(Spain) Herbalife Gran Canaria	37	

Eighthfinals

Game	Player	Team	PIR	Ref.
1	(United States) Victor Rudd	(Russia) Nizhny Novgorod	32	
2	(United States) Errick McCollum (2)	(Turkey) Galatasaray Odeabank	29	

Quarterfinals

Game	Player	Team	PIR	Ref.
1	(Slovenia) Alen Omić (2)	(Spain) Herbalife Gran Canaria	27	
1	(United States) Mardy Collins	(France) SIG Strasbourg	27	
1	(United States) Deon Thompson	(Germany) Bayern Munich	27	
2	(United States) Dominique Sutton	(Italy) Dolomiti Energia Trento	34	

Semifinals

Game	Player	Team	PIR	Ref.
1	(Azerbaijan) Chuck Davis	(Turkey) Galatasaray Odeabank	29	
2	(United States) D. J. Seeley	(Spain) Herbalife Gran Canaria	28	

== See also ==
- 2015–16 Euroleague
- 2015–16 FIBA Europe Cup
