= Euroleague Basketball =

Basketball governing body in Europe

- Type: Limited liability company
- Industry: Sport
- Founded: 1 July 2000; 26 years ago
- Headquarters: Quatre Camins, 9-13 08022, Barcelona, Catalonia, Spain
- Area served: Europe
- Key people: Dejan Bodiroga (President); Jesus "Chus" Bueno (CEO)
- Website: euroleaguebasketball.net

Euroleague Basketball, run by Euroleague Commercial Assets (ECA), is a private company that runs and operates men's professional basketball club competitions in Europe, the first-tier EuroLeague, and the second-tier EuroCup. It has been organizing the EuroLeague competition since the 2000–01 season backed by ULEB. Euroleague also oversees the European national basketball league rankings since 2008, and the Euroleague Basketball Next Generation Tournament. It is headquartered in Barcelona.

== Company structure ==
Euroleague Commercial Assets S.A. (ECA), founded on 8 March 2006, is the limited liability company, acting pursuant to Luxembourg law, with registered office in rue Beaumont 17, L-1219 Luxembourg. It is governed by the statutes and the resolutions of the governing bodies, the owners of which are the clubs participating in the EuroLeague and a number of leagues.

The General Assembly is the ECA body of representation and governance, where the ECA shareholders meet together with the associated clubs, which is responsible for the general supervision of the issues regarding the EuroLeague and for approving the Bylaws, as stipulated in the EuroLeague Club Licensing Rules. In addition, it ensures the coordination of the clubs and has the authority to make decisions and confer functions on the Shareholders Executive Board.

The General Assembly constituted the Shareholders Executive Board and granted it the duties to submit proposals and recommendations to the General Assembly, monitor and control the observance of the resolutions made by the General Assembly, take urgent measures when there is no time to convene a meeting of the General Assembly (subject to the subsequent ratification of the General Assembly), and exercise any further functions conferred on it by the General Assembly. The Shareholders Executive Board will consist of the following members, elected by the General Assembly, for a three-year term of office:

- 13 representatives of the licensed clubs that participate in the EuroLeague competition: Anadolu Efes, Baskonia, FC Barcelona, Fenerbahçe, Maccabi Tel Aviv, Milan, Olympiacos, Panathinaikos, Real Madrid, ASVEL Basket, Bayern Munich, Žalgiris, and CSKA Moscow (formerly; now suspended).
- The chief executive officer, who will act as chairman of the Shareholders Executive Board. The chairman is only empowered to vote in the event of equality of votes, in which case they will have the casting vote only.

Euroleague Properties S.A. (EP), founded on 3 August 2009, is the limited liability company, controlled by ECA, responsible for managing and organising the EuroLeague and EuroCup competitions in which the EuroLeague and EuroCup clubs participate, as well as for commercialising the properties of these competitions (to deal with the promotion and development of the commercial activities linked to these competitions), in accordance with what is established in the bylaws.

EP has designated the company Euroleague Entertainment & Services, S.L.U., controlled by ECA, as the body responsible for the management and administrative organisation of the EuroLeague and EuroCup competitions in accordance with what is established in the bylaws. This company must adhere to the EuroLeague Regulations and any future modifications, amendments or derogations whenever the governing bodies approve them.

Euroleague Ventures S.A. (EV), founded on 29 June 2016, is the limited liability company incorporated by EP and IMG Media Limited according to the joint venture agreement signed by both parties with the aim of increasing the stature, awareness and economic value of the EuroLeague, EuroCup and the clubs. EP and IMG Media Limited have agreed on a long-term cooperation in the management, administration and organisation of the promotion and commercialisation of the EuroLeague and EuroCup through the incorporation of EV.

== See also ==
- Historical European national basketball league rankings
- EuroLeague
- EuroLeague Final Four
- EuroLeague SuperCup
- EuroCup
- Euroleague Basketball Next Generation Tournament
- ULEB
- EuroLeague TV
