= 2015–16 Eurocup Basketball regular season =

The 2015–16 Eurocup Basketball Regular Season was played from 13 October to 16 December 2015. A total of 36 teams competed in the group stage to decide the 24 places in the Last 32 with the 8 places dropped from the Euroleague Regular Season.

== Format ==
In each group, teams played against each other home-and-away in a round-robin format. The four first qualified teams advanced to the Last 32, while the fifth and the sixth-placed teams was eliminated. The rounds were 13–14 October, 20–21 October, 27–28 October, 3–4 November, 10–11 November, 17–18 November, 24–25 November, 1–2 December, 8–9 December and 15–16 December 2015.

=== Tiebreakers ===
If teams are level on record at the end of the Regular Season, tiebreakers are applied in the following order:

1. Head-to-head record.
2. Head-to-head point differential.
3. Point differential during the Regular Season.
4. Points scored during the regular season.
5. Sum of quotients of points scored and points allowed in each Regular Season match.

== Groups ==
=== Conference 1 ===
==== Group A ====
Pos	Team	Pld	W	L	PF	PA	PD	Qualification
1	(Spain) Dominion Bilbao Basket	10	8	2	856	729	+127	Advance to Last 32
2	(Italy) Dolomiti Energia Trento	10	7	3	875	827	+48	Advance to Last 32
3	(Slovenia) Union Olimpija	10	5	5	799	828	−29	Advance to Last 32
4	(Germany) EWE Baskets Oldenburg	10	4	6	764	820	−56	Advance to Last 32
5	(France) JSF Nanterre	10	4	6	772	801	−29	
6	(Germany) Telekom Baskets Bonn	10	2	8	838	899	−61	

Source: Eurocup Basketball

14 October 2015	Telekom Baskets Bonn (Germany)	88–77	(Germany) EWE Baskets Oldenburg	Bonn, Germany
		Boxscore

14 October 2015	Dominion Bilbao Basket (Spain)	73–76	(France) JSF Nanterre	Bilbao, Spain
		Boxscore

14 October 2015	Union Olimpija (Slovenia)	98–97	(Italy) Dolomiti Energia Trento	Ljubljana, Slovenia
		Boxscore

20 October 2015	Telekom Baskets Bonn (Germany)	81–90	(Spain) Dominion Bilbao Basket	Bonn, Germany
		Boxscore

21 October 2015	JSF Nanterre (France)	85–72	(Slovenia) Union Olimpija	Nanterre, France
		Boxscore

21 October 2015	Dolomiti Energia Trento (Italy)	80–69	(Germany) EWE Baskets Oldenburg	Trento, Italy
		Boxscore

27 October 2015	EWE Baskets Oldenburg (Germany)	60–94	(Spain) Dominion Bilbao Basket	Oldenburg, Germany
		Boxscore

28 October 2015	Union Olimpija (Slovenia)	77–82	(Germany) Telekom Baskets Bonn	Ljubljana, Slovenia
		Boxscore

28 October 2015	Dolomiti Energia Trento (Italy)	70–55	(France) JSF Nanterre	Trento, Italy
		Boxscore

4 November 2015	Telekom Baskets Bonn (Germany)	89–96	(Italy) Dolomiti Energia Trento	Bonn, Germany
		Boxscore

4 November 2015	EWE Baskets Oldenburg (Germany)	84–81	(France) JSF Nanterre	Oldenburg, Germany
		Boxscore

4 November 2015	Dominion Bilbao Basket (Spain)	80–83	(Slovenia) Union Olimpija	Bilbao, Spain
		Boxscore

10 November 2015	JSF Nanterre (France)	101–78	(Germany) Telekom Baskets Bonn	Nanterre, France
		Boxscore

11 November 2015	Union Olimpija (Slovenia)	81–82	(Germany) EWE Baskets Oldenburg	Ljubljana, Slovenia
		Boxscore

11 November 2015	Dolomiti Energia Trento (Italy)	75–80	(Spain) Dominion Bilbao Basket	Trento, Italy
		Boxscore

17 November 2015	JSF Nanterre (France)	52–83	(Spain) Dominion Bilbao Basket	Nanterre, France
		Boxscore

18 November 2015	EWE Baskets Oldenburg (Germany)	77–70	(Germany) Telekom Baskets Bonn	Oldenburg, Germany
		Boxscore

18 November 2015	Dolomiti Energia Trento (Italy)	90–77	(Slovenia) Union Olimpija	Trento, Italy
		Boxscore

24 November 2015	Union Olimpija (Slovenia)	78–65	(France) JSF Nanterre	Ljubljana, Slovenia
		Boxscore

25 November 2015	EWE Baskets Oldenburg (Germany)	80–93	(Italy) Dolomiti Energia Trento	Oldenburg, Germany
		Boxscore

25 November 2015	Dominion Bilbao Basket (Spain)	95–80	(Germany) Telekom Baskets Bonn	Bilbao, Spain
		Boxscore

1 December 2015	JSF Nanterre (France)	79–85	(Italy) Dolomiti Energia Trento	Nanterre, France
		Boxscore

2 December 2015	Telekom Baskets Bonn (Germany)	88–93	(Slovenia) Union Olimpija	Bonn, Germany
		Boxscore

2 December 2015	Dominion Bilbao Basket (Spain)	73–68	(Germany) EWE Baskets Oldenburg	Bilbao, Spain
		Boxscore

8 December 2015	JSF Nanterre (France)	83–92	(Germany) EWE Baskets Oldenburg	Nanterre, France
		Boxscore

9 December 2015	Union Olimpija (Slovenia)	63–84	(Spain) Dominion Bilbao Basket	Ljubljana, Slovenia
		Boxscore

9 December 2015	Dolomiti Energia Trento (Italy)	98–96	(Germany) Telekom Baskets Bonn	Trento, Italy
		Boxscore

16 December 2015	Telekom Baskets Bonn (Germany)	86–95	(France) JSF Nanterre	Bonn, Germany
		Boxscore

16 December 2015	EWE Baskets Oldenburg (Germany)	75–77	(Slovenia) Union Olimpija	Oldenburg, Germany
		Boxscore

16 December 2015	Dominion Bilbao Basket (Spain)	104–91	(Italy) Dolomiti Energia Trento	Bilbao, Spain
		Boxscore

==== Group B ====
Pos	Team	Pld	W	L	PF	PA	PD	Qualification
1	(Spain) Herbalife Gran Canaria	10	8	2	839	752	+87	Advance to Last 32
2	(Germany) MHP Riesen Ludwigsburg	10	7	3	811	732	+79	Advance to Last 32
3	(Italy) Grissin Bon Reggio Emilia	10	6	4	778	759	+19	Advance to Last 32
4	(Germany) Alba Berlin	10	5	5	774	790	−16	Advance to Last 32
5	(France) Le Mans Sarthe	10	3	7	721	785	−64	
6	(Italy) Enel Basket Brindisi	10	1	9	710	815	−105	

Source: Eurocup Basketball

13 October 2015	Le Mans Sarthe (France)	74–79	(Spain) Herbalife Gran Canaria	Le Mans, France
		Boxscore

14 October 2015	MHP Riesen Ludwigsburg (Germany)	79–60	(Germany) Alba Berlin	Ludwigsburg, Germany
		Boxscore

14 October 2015	Grissin Bon Reggio Emilia (Italy)	82–79	(Italy) Enel Basket Brindisi	Reggio Emilia, Italy
		Boxscore

20 October 2015	Alba Berlin (Germany)	82–76	(Italy) Grissin Bon Reggio Emilia	Berlin, Germany
		Boxscore

21 October 2015	Enel Basket Brindisi (Italy)	65–72	(France) Le Mans Sarthe Basket	Brindisi, Italy
		Boxscore

21 October 2015	Herbalife Gran Canaria (Spain)	95–75	(Germany) MHP Riesen Ludwigsburg	Las Palmas, Spain
		Boxscore

27 October 2015	Herbalife Gran Canaria (Spain)	103–76	(Italy) Enel Basket Brindisi	Las Palmas, Spain
		Boxscore

28 October 2015	MHP Riesen Ludwigsburg (Germany)	65–76	(Italy) Grissin Bon Reggio Emilia	Ludwigsburg, Germany
		Boxscore

28 October 2015	Le Mans Sarthe (France)	84–88	(Germany) Alba Berlin	Le Mans, France
		Boxscore

3 November 2015	Grissin Bon Reggio Emilia (Italy)	93–82	(France) Le Mans Sarthe	Reggio Emilia, Italy
		Boxscore

3 November 2015	MHP Riesen Ludwigsburg (Germany)	84–80	(Italy) Enel Basket Brindisi	Ludwigsburg, Germany
		Boxscore

4 November 2015	Alba Berlin (Germany)	84–71	(Spain) Herbalife Gran Canaria	Berlin, Germany
		Boxscore

10 November 2015	Le Mans Sarthe Basket (France)	75–81	(Germany) MHP Riesen Ludwigsburg	Le Mans, France
		Boxscore

10 November 2015	Herbalife Gran Canaria (Spain)	76–67	(Italy) Grissin Bon Reggio Emilia	Las Palmas, Spain
		Boxscore

11 November 2015	Enel Basket Brindisi (Italy)	68–72	(Germany) Alba Berlin	Brindisi, Italy
		Boxscore

17 November 2015	Alba Berlin (Germany)	79–90	(Germany) MHP Riesen Ludwigsburg	Berlin, Germany
		Boxscore

17 November 2015	Herbalife Gran Canaria (Spain)	77–62	(France) Le Mans Sarthe	Las Palmas, Spain
		Boxscore

18 November 2015	Enel Basket Brindisi (Italy)	87–81	(Italy) Grissin Bon Reggio Emilia	Brindisi, Italy
		Boxscore

24 November 2015	MHP Riesen Ludwigsburg (Germany)	92–89	(Spain) Herbalife Gran Canaria	Ludwigsburg, Germany
		Boxscore

25 November 2015	Le Mans Sarthe Basket (France)	66–45	(Italy) Enel Basket Brindisi	Le Mans, France
		Boxscore

25 November 2015	Grissin Bon Reggio Emilia (Italy)	74–71	(Germany) Alba Berlin	Reggio Emilia, Italy
		Boxscore

2 December 2015	Alba Berlin (Germany)	80–86	(France) Le Mans Sarthe	Berlin, Germany
		Boxscore

2 December 2015	Grissin Bon Reggio Emilia (Italy)	69–68	(Germany) MHP Riesen Ludwigsburg	Reggio Emilia, Italy
		Boxscore

2 December 2015	Enel Basket Brindisi (Italy)	71–88	(Spain) Herbalife Gran Canaria	Brindisi, Italy
		Boxscore

9 December 2015	Le Mans Sarthe Basket (France)	71–87	(Italy) Grissin Bon Reggio Emilia	Le Mans, France
		Boxscore

9 December 2015	Enel Basket Brindisi (Italy)	60–87	(Germany) MHP Riesen Ludwigsburg	Brindisi, Italy
		Boxscore

9 December 2015	Herbalife Gran Canaria (Spain)	83–78	(Germany) Alba Berlin	Las Palmas, Spain
		Boxscore

16 December 2015	Alba Berlin (Germany)	80–79	(Italy) Enel Basket Brindisi	Berlin, Germany
		Boxscore

16 December 2015	MHP Riesen Ludwigsburg (Germany)	90–49	(France) Le Mans Sarthe Basket	Ludwigsburg, Germany
		Boxscore

16 December 2015	Grissin Bon Reggio Emilia (Italy)	73–78	(Spain) Herbalife Gran Canaria	Reggio Emilia, Italy
		Boxscore

==== Group C ====
Pos	Team	Pld	W	L	PF	PA	PD	Qualification
1	(Spain) Valencia Basket	10	10	0	809	689	+120	Advance to Last 32
2	(Spain) CAI Zaragoza	10	7	3	760	757	+3	Advance to Last 32
3	(Germany) ratiopharm Ulm	10	4	6	804	792	+12	Advance to Last 32
4	(Italy) Umana Reyer Venezia	10	4	6	721	760	−39	Advance to Last 32
5	(Belgium) Proximus Spirou	10	3	7	731	782	−51	
6	(France) SLUC Nancy	10	2	8	714	759	−45	

Source: Eurocup Basketball

13 October 2015	SLUC Nancy (France)	71–74	(Spain) Valencia Basket	Nancy, France
		Boxscore

14 October 2015	ratiopharm Ulm (Germany)	87–68	(Italy) Umana Reyer Venezia	Ulm, Germany
		Boxscore

14 October 2015	CAI Zaragoza (Spain)	80–70	(Belgium) Proximus Spirou	Zaragoza, Spain
		Boxscore

20 October 2015	Valencia Basket (Spain)	87–68	(Spain) CAI Zaragoza	Valencia, Spain
		Boxscore

21 October 2015	Proximus Spirou (Belgium)	80–86	(Germany) ratiopharm Ulm	Charleroi, Belgium
		Boxscore

21 October 2015	Umana Reyer Venezia (Italy)	70–67	(France) SLUC Nancy	Venice, Italy
		Boxscore

27 October 2015	ratiopharm Ulm (Germany)	79–82	(Spain) Valencia Basket	Ulm, Germany
		Boxscore

28 October 2015	SLUC Nancy (France)	76–78	(Spain) CAI Zaragoza	Nancy, France
		Boxscore

28 October 2015	Umana Reyer Venezia (Italy)	73–69	(Belgium) Proximus Spirou	Venice, Italy
		Boxscore

3 November 2015	Valencia Basket (Spain)	88–59	(Italy) Umana Reyer Venezia	Valencia, Spain
		Boxscore

4 November 2015	SLUC Nancy (France)	67–63	(Belgium) Proximus Spirou	Nancy, France
		Boxscore

4 November 2015	CAI Zaragoza (Spain)	69–59	(Germany) ratiopharm Ulm	Zaragoza, Spain
		Boxscore

11 November 2015	ratiopharm Ulm (Germany)	90–73	(France) SLUC Nancy	Ulm, Germany
		Boxscore

11 November 2015	Proximus Spirou (Belgium)	49–65	(Spain) Valencia Basket	Charleroi, Belgium
		Boxscore

11 November 2015	Umana Reyer Venezia (Italy)	77–79	(Spain) CAI Zaragoza	Venice, Italy
		Boxscore

18 November 2015	Proximus Spirou (Belgium)	80–69	(Spain) CAI Zaragoza	Charleroi, Belgium
		Boxscore

18 November 2015	Valencia Basket (Spain)	77–65	(France) SLUC Nancy	Valencia, Spain
		Boxscore

18 November 2015	Umana Reyer Venezia (Italy)	90–78	(Germany) ratiopharm Ulm	Venice, Italy
		Boxscore

24 November 2015	CAI Zaragoza (Spain)	76–84	(Spain) Valencia Basket	Zaragoza, Spain
		Boxscore

25 November 2015	ratiopharm Ulm (Germany)	76–77	(Belgium) Proximus Spirou	Ulm, Germany
		Boxscore

25 November 2015	SLUC Nancy (France)	62–71	(Italy) Umana Reyer Venezia	Nancy, France
		Boxscore

2 December 2015	CAI Zaragoza (Spain)	75–71	(France) SLUC Nancy	Zaragoza, Spain
		Boxscore

2 December 2015	Proximus Spirou (Belgium)	86–83	(Italy) Umana Reyer Venezia	Charleroi, Belgium
		Boxscore

2 December 2015	Valencia Basket (Spain)	93–88	(Germany) ratiopharm Ulm	Valencia, Spain
		Boxscore

8 December 2015	Proximus Spirou (Belgium)	81–86	(France) SLUC Nancy	Charleroi, Belgium
		Boxscore

9 December 2015	ratiopharm Ulm (Germany)	81–84	(Spain) CAI Zaragoza	Ulm, Germany
		Boxscore

9 December 2015	Umana Reyer Venezia (Italy)	58–62	(Spain) Valencia Basket	Venice, Italy
		Boxscore

15 December 2015	SLUC Nancy (France)	76–80	(Germany) ratiopharm Ulm	Nancy, France
		Boxscore

16 December 2015	CAI Zaragoza (Spain)	82–72	(Italy) Umana Reyer Venezia	Zaragoza, Spain
		Boxscore

16 December 2015	Valencia Basket (Spain)	97–76	(Belgium) Proximus Spirou	Valencia, Spain
		Boxscore

=== Conference 2 ===
==== Group D ====
Pos	Team	Pld	W	L	PF	PA	PD	Qualification
1	(Greece) Aris	10	7	3	731	701	+30	Advance to Last 32
2	(Russia) UNICS	10	7	3	800	722	+78	Advance to Last 32
3	(Turkey) Trabzonspor Medical Park	10	5	5	754	759	−5	Advance to Last 32
4	(Turkey) Banvit	10	5	5	770	757	+13	Advance to Last 32
5	(Montenegro) Budućnost VOLI	10	4	6	747	725	+22	
6	(Romania) Steaua CSM EximBank București	10	2	8	676	814	−138	

Source: Eurocup Basketball

14 October 2015	Trabzonspor Medical Park (Turkey)	74–71	(Greece) Aris	Trabzon, Turkey
		Boxscore

14 October 2015	UNICS (Russia)	94–68	(Romania) Steaua CSM EximBank București	Kazan, Russia
		Boxscore

14 October 2015	Budućnost VOLI (Montenegro)	83–70	(Turkey) Banvit	Podgorica, Montenegro
		Boxscore

21 October 2015	Aris (Greece)	75–57	(Montenegro) Budućnost VOLI	Thessaloniki, Greece
		Boxscore

21 October 2015	Banvit (Turkey)	79–85	(Russia) UNICS	Bandırma, Turkey
		Boxscore

21 October 2015	Steaua CSM EximBank București (Romania)	76–71	(Turkey) Trabzonspor Medical Park	Bucharest, Romania
		Boxscore

28 October 2015	UNICS (Russia)	73–74	(Greece) Aris	Kazan, Russia
		Boxscore

28 October 2015	Trabzonspor Medical Park (Turkey)	75–71	(Montenegro) Budućnost VOLI	Trabzon, Turkey
		Boxscore

28 October 2015	Steaua CSM EximBank București (Romania)	64–78	(Turkey) Banvit	Bucharest, Romania
		Boxscore

4 November 2015	Aris (Greece)	70–66	(Romania) Steaua CSM EximBank București	Thessaloniki, Greece
		Boxscore

4 November 2015	Trabzonspor Medical Park (Turkey)	96–88	(Turkey) Banvit	Trabzon, Turkey
		Boxscore

4 November 2015	Budućnost VOLI (Montenegro)	73–63	(Russia) UNICS	Podgorica, Montenegro
		Boxscore

11 November 2015	UNICS (Russia)	78–64	(Turkey) Trabzonspor Medical Park	Kazan, Russia
		Boxscore

11 November 2015	Banvit (Turkey)	96–84	(Greece) Aris	Bandırma, Turkey
		Boxscore

11 November 2015	Steaua CSM EximBank București (Romania)	81–75	(Montenegro) Budućnost VOLI	Bucharest, Romania
		Boxscore

18 November 2015	Banvit (Turkey)	76–68	(Montenegro) Budućnost VOLI	Bandırma, Turkey
		Boxscore

18 November 2015	Aris (Greece)	78–70	(Turkey) Trabzonspor Medical Park	Thessaloniki, Greece
		Boxscore

18 November 2015	Steaua CSM EximBank București (Romania)	71–88	(Russia) UNICS	Bucharest, Romania
		Boxscore

25 November 2015	Trabzonspor Medical Park (Turkey)	82–67	(Romania) Steaua CSM EximBank București	Trabzon, Turkey
		Boxscore

25 November 2015	UNICS (Russia)	78–69	(Turkey) Banvit	Kazan, Russia
		Boxscore

25 November 2015	Budućnost VOLI (Montenegro)	75–56	(Greece) Aris	Podgorica, Montenegro
		Boxscore

2 December 2015	Aris (Greece)	76–70	(Russia) UNICS	Thessaloniki, Greece
		Boxscore

2 December 2015	Banvit (Turkey)	90–60	(Romania) Steaua CSM EximBank București	Bandırma, Turkey
		Boxscore

2 December 2015	Budućnost VOLI (Montenegro)	79–82	(Turkey) Trabzonspor Medical Park	Podgorica, Montenegro
		Boxscore

9 December 2015	UNICS (Russia)	91–77	(Montenegro) Budućnost VOLI	Kazan, Russia
		Boxscore

9 December 2015	Banvit (Turkey)	71–67	(Turkey) Trabzonspor Medical Park	Bandırma, Turkey
		Boxscore

9 December 2015	Steaua CSM EximBank București (Romania)	67–77	(Greece) Aris	Bucharest, Romania
		Boxscore

16 December 2015	Aris (Greece)	72–53	(Turkey) Banvit	Thessaloniki, Greece
		Boxscore

16 December 2015	Trabzonspor Medical Park (Turkey)	73–80	(Russia) UNICS	Trabzon, Turkey
		Boxscore

16 December 2015	Budućnost VOLI (Montenegro)	89–56	(Romania) Steaua CSM EximBank București	Podgorica, Montenegro
		Boxscore

==== Group E ====
Pos	Team	Pld	W	L	PF	PA	PD	Qualification
1	(Russia) Zenit Saint Petersburg	10	8	2	820	746	+74	Advance to Last 32
2	(Russia) Avtodor Saratov	10	7	3	947	839	+108	Advance to Last 32
3	(Greece) PAOK	10	5	5	773	831	−58	Advance to Last 32
4	(Hungary) Szolnoki Olaj	10	4	6	763	827	−64	Advance to Last 32
5	(Turkey) Beşiktaş Sompo Japan	10	4	6	810	842	−32	
6	(Lithuania) Lietuvos rytas	10	2	8	856	884	−28	

Source: Eurocup Basketball

14 October 2015	Lietuvos rytas (Lithuania)	87–91	(Turkey) Beşiktaş Sompo Japan	Vilnius, Lithuania
		Boxscore

14 October 2015	PAOK (Greece)	72–69	(Hungary) Szolnoki Olaj	Thessaloniki, Greece
		Boxscore

14 October 2015	Avtodor Saratov (Russia)	85–90	(Russia) Zenit Saint Petersburg	Saratov, Russia
		Boxscore

20 October 2015	Szolnoki Olaj (Hungary)	65–89	(Lithuania) Lietuvos rytas	Szolnok, Hungary
		Boxscore

21 October 2015	Beşiktaş Sompo Japan (Turkey)	79–103	(Russia) Avtodor Saratov	Istanbul, Turkey
		Boxscore

21 October 2015	Zenit Saint Petersburg (Russia)	76–66	(Greece) PAOK	Saint Petersburg, Russia
		Boxscore

28 October 2015	Lietuvos rytas (Lithuania)	81–97	(Russia) Avtodor Saratov	Vilnius, Lithuania
		Boxscore

28 October 2015	PAOK (Greece)	80–100	(Turkey) Beşiktaş Sompo Japan	Thessaloniki, Greece
		Boxscore

28 October 2015	Szolnoki Olaj (Hungary)	75–84	(Russia) Zenit Saint Petersburg	Szolnok, Hungary
		Boxscore

4 November 2015	Avtodor Saratov (Russia)	90–68	(Greece) PAOK	Saratov, Russia
		Boxscore

4 November 2015	Lietuvos rytas (Lithuania)	65–70	(Russia) Zenit Saint Petersburg	Vilnius, Lithuania
		Boxscore

4 November 2015	Beşiktaş Sompo Japan (Turkey)	76–67	(Hungary) Szolnoki Olaj	Istanbul, Turkey
		Boxscore

11 November 2015	Zenit Saint Petersburg (Russia)	82–58	(Turkey) Beşiktaş Sompo Japan	Saint Petersburg, Russia
		Boxscore

11 November 2015	PAOK (Greece)	81–76	(Lithuania) Lietuvos rytas	Thessaloniki, Greece
		Boxscore

11 November 2015	Szolnoki Olaj (Hungary)	83–79	(Russia) Avtodor Saratov	Szolnok, Hungary
		Boxscore

18 November 2015	Zenit Saint Petersburg (Russia)	81–88	(Russia) Avtodor Saratov	Saint Petersburg, Russia
		Boxscore

18 November 2015	Szolnoki Olaj (Hungary)	78–69	(Greece) PAOK	Szolnok, Hungary
		Boxscore

18 November 2015	Beşiktaş Sompo Japan (Turkey)	92–103	(Lithuania) Lietuvos rytas	Istanbul, Turkey
		Boxscore

25 November 2015	Avtodor Saratov (Russia)	93–83	(Turkey) Beşiktaş Sompo Japan	Saratov, Russia
		Boxscore

25 November 2015	Lietuvos rytas (Lithuania)	98–99	(Hungary) Szolnoki Olaj	Vilnius, Lithuania
		Boxscore

25 November 2015	PAOK (Greece)	70–89	(Russia) Zenit Saint Petersburg	Thessaloniki, Greece
		Boxscore

2 December 2015	Avtodor Saratov (Russia)	109–92	(Lithuania) Lietuvos rytas	Saratov, Russia
		Boxscore

2 December 2015	Zenit Saint Petersburg (Russia)	89–64	(Hungary) Szolnoki Olaj	Saint Petersburg, Russia
		Boxscore

2 December 2015	Beşiktaş Sompo Japan (Turkey)	73–75	(Greece) PAOK	Istanbul, Turkey
		Boxscore

9 December 2015	Zenit Saint Petersburg (Russia)	92–84	(Lithuania) Lietuvos rytas	Saint Petersburg, Russia
		Boxscore

9 December 2015	PAOK (Greece)	104–99	(Russia) Avtodor Saratov	Thessaloniki, Greece
		Boxscore

9 December 2015	Szolnoki Olaj (Hungary)	85–67	(Turkey) Beşiktaş Sompo Japan	Szolnok, Hungary
		Boxscore

16 December 2015	Avtodor Saratov (Russia)	104–78	(Hungary) Szolnoki Olaj	Saratov, Russia
		Boxscore

16 December 2015	Lietuvos rytas (Lithuania)	81–88	(Greece) PAOK	Vilnius, Lithuania
		Boxscore

16 December 2015	Beşiktaş Sompo Japan (Turkey)	91–67	(Russia) Zenit Saint Petersburg	Istanbul, Turkey
		Boxscore

==== Group F ====
Pos	Team	Pld	W	L	PF	PA	PD	Qualification
1	(Turkey) Galatasaray Odeabank	10	7	3	867	789	+78	Advance to Last 32
2	(Lithuania) Neptūnas	10	6	4	829	807	+22	Advance to Last 32
3	(Russia) Nizhny Novgorod	10	6	4	801	780	+21	Advance to Last 32
4	(Israel) Hapoel Jerusalem	10	5	5	808	798	+10	Advance to Last 32
5	(Greece) AEK	10	5	5	794	812	−18	
6	(Russia) Krasny Oktyabr	10	1	9	797	910	−113	

Source: Eurocup Basketball

14 October 2015	Neptūnas (Lithuania)	90–94	(Turkey) Galatasaray Odeabank	Klaipėda, Lithuania
		Boxscore

14 October 2015	AEK (Greece)	94–96	(Russia) Krasny Oktyabr	Athens, Greece
		Boxscore

14 October 2015	Nizhny Novgorod (Russia)	92–71	(Israel) Hapoel Jerusalem	Nizhny Novgorod, Russia
		Boxscore

21 October 2015	Krasny Oktyabr (Russia)	73–78	(Russia) Nizhny Novgorod	Volgograd, Russia
		Boxscore

21 October 2015	Galatasaray Odeabank (Turkey)	89–65	(Greece) AEK	Istanbul, Turkey
		Boxscore

21 October 2015	Hapoel Jerusalem (Israel)	74–59	(Lithuania) Neptūnas	Jerusalem, Israel
		Boxscore

28 October 2015	Neptūnas (Lithuania)	99–90	(Russia) Krasny Oktyabr	Klaipėda, Lithuania
		Boxscore

28 October 2015	AEK (Greece)	87–70	(Russia) Nizhny Novgorod	Athens, Greece
		Boxscore

28 October 2015	Galatasaray Odeabank (Turkey)	87–79	(Israel) Hapoel Jerusalem	Istanbul, Turkey
		Boxscore

4 November 2015	Nizhny Novgorod (Russia)	78–82	(Lithuania) Neptūnas	Nizhny Novgorod, Russia
		Boxscore

4 November 2015	AEK (Greece)	75–74	(Israel) Hapoel Jerusalem	Athens, Greece
		Boxscore

4 November 2015	Krasny Oktyabr (Russia)	72–88	(Turkey) Galatasaray Odeabank	Volgograd, Russia
		Boxscore

10 November 2015	Galatasaray Odeabank (Turkey)	87–85	(Russia) Nizhny Novgorod	Istanbul, Turkey
		Boxscore

11 November 2015	Neptūnas (Lithuania)	80–86	(Greece) AEK	Klaipėda, Lithuania
		Boxscore

11 November 2015	Hapoel Jerusalem (Israel)	92–90	(Russia) Krasny Oktyabr	Jerusalem, Israel
		Boxscore

18 November 2015	Krasny Oktyabr (Russia)	78–82	(Greece) AEK	Volgograd, Russia
		Boxscore

18 November 2015	Galatasaray Odeabank (Turkey)	76–82	(Lithuania) Neptūnas	Istanbul, Turkey
		Boxscore

18 November 2015	Hapoel Jerusalem (Israel)	70–74	(Russia) Nizhny Novgorod	Jerusalem, Israel
		Boxscore

24 November 2015	Neptūnas (Lithuania)	87–85	(Israel) Hapoel Jerusalem	Klaipėda, Lithuania
		Boxscore

25 November 2015	Nizhny Novgorod (Russia)	82–74	(Russia) Krasny Oktyabr	Nizhny Novgorod, Russia
		Boxscore

25 November 2015	AEK (Greece)	73–86	(Turkey) Galatasaray Odeabank	Athens, Greece
		Boxscore

1 December 2015	Nizhny Novgorod (Russia)	86–79	(Greece) AEK	Nizhny Novgorod, Russia
		Boxscore

1 December 2015	Hapoel Jerusalem (Israel)	86–82	(Turkey) Galatasaray Odeabank	Jerusalem, Israel
		Boxscore

2 December 2015	Krasny Oktyabr (Russia)	74–97	(Lithuania) Neptūnas	Volgograd, Russia
		Boxscore

9 December 2015	Neptūnas (Lithuania)	82–75	(Russia) Nizhny Novgorod	Klaipėda, Lithuania
		Boxscore

9 December 2015	Galatasaray Odeabank (Turkey)	103–76	(Russia) Krasny Oktyabr	Istanbul, Turkey
		Boxscore

9 December 2015	Hapoel Jerusalem (Israel)	82–78	(Greece) AEK	Jerusalem, Israel
		Boxscore

16 December 2015	Nizhny Novgorod (Russia)	81–75	(Turkey) Galatasaray Odeabank	Nizhny Novgorod, Russia
		Boxscore

16 December 2015	Krasny Oktyabr (Russia)	74–95	(Israel) Hapoel Jerusalem	Volgograd, Russia
		Boxscore

16 December 2015	AEK (Greece)	75–71	(Lithuania) Neptūnas	Athens, Greece
		Boxscore
