= Historical European national basketball league rankings =

- Sport: Basketball
- Founded: 1958
- Country: FIBA Europe member associations
- Continent: Europe

The historical European national basketball league rankings are the rankings for each of the different European regional and domestic basketball leagues that are or were eligible to participate in Europe's international continental professional club basketball competitions.

== History ==
Over the history of European-wide club basketball competitions, dating back to the old FIBA European Champions Cup (now known as the EuroLeague), which began in 1958, three European national domestic leagues stood out in prominence under the old ratings system that was based only on basketball game competition results, and was originally overseen by FIBA, and then later by Euroleague Basketball Company. The Italian Lega A, which was the top league historically, the Spanish ACB, which was the second best league historically, and the Greek Basket League, which was the third best league historically. The old ratings system, which was used from 1958–2007, included only basketball game competition related results.

Also, the old USSR Premiere League, and the old Yugoslav First Federal League, were additional leagues that historically were among the elite of Europe before they folded. The old Yugoslav First Federal League exists in a similar form today, as the Adriatic ABA League, and the old USSR Premiere League exists in a similar form today, as the VTB United League.

== FIBA EuroLeague domestic league rankings (by country) 1958 – 2001 ==
The FIBA EuroLeague domestic league rankings (by country), from 1958–2001, including the FIBA SuproLeague 2000–01 season. These were the domestic league rankings that were based on play in the first-tier European competition, the EuroLeague. These rankings were part of the old rating system, which was used from 1958–2007, and included only basketball game competition related results as rankings criteria.

Rk	League (by country)	TP	P	CW	GP	W	D	L	PS	PSA	PSD	RP
1.	Italy	10	67	12	977	612	2	363	80889	75345	5544	1226
2.	Spain	8	63	9	941	590	3	348	80184	72717	7467	1183
3.	Greece	8	59	3	705	414	1	290	54924	53421	1503	829
4.	France	14	56	1	660	327	1	332	51834	51304	530	655
5.	Israel	6	51	3	537	307	0	230	45033	43217	1816	614
6.	Croatia	4	32	5	465	252	0	213	37334	36852	482	504
7.	Russia	4	30	4	360	207	0	153	29383	27478	1905	414
8.	Turkey	13	51	0	412	202	0	210	30815	31405	−590	404
9.	Germany	15	53	0	377	154	1	222	29700	30618	−918	309
10.	Belgium	8	39	0	292	136	4	152	23767	23731	36	276
11.	Serbia	5	19	1	225	116	1	108	18671	18301	370	233
12.	Czech Republic	6	33	0	207	108	3	96	17074	16496	578	219
13.	Bulgaria	8	36	0	184	87	2	95	14910	15021	−111	176
14.	Slovenia	3	16	0	185	87	0	98	13923	13865	58	174
15.	Netherlands	14	34	0	214	83	1	130	18140	18637	−497	167
16.	Poland	10	33	0	150	60	1	89	12113	12618	−505	121
17.	Lithuania	2	9	1	100	54	0	46	8323	8056	267	108
18.	Hungary	7	33	0	116	51	0	65	9750	9802	−52	102
19.	Romania	4	28	0	107	46	0	61	8153	8633	−480	92
20.	Finland	12	36	0	130	44	1	85	10400	11304	−904	89
21.	Austria	9	38	0	145	44	1	100	11574	12565	−991	89
22.	Bosnia-Herzegovina	3	6	1	65	40	0	25	5806	5602	204	80
23.	England	15	27	0	124	34	2	88	9866	11266	−1400	70
24.	Sweden	11	33	0	128	33	1	94	10196	11531	−1335	67
25.	Switzerland	12	29	0	99	28	2	69	8123	9160	−1037	58
26.	Portugal	8	31	0	137	28	1	108	10100	12003	−1903	57
27.	Latvia	1	7	3	34	23	0	11	2745	2527	218	46
28.	Albania	5	24	0	66	19	1	46	5281	5958	−677	39
29.	Georgia	2	6	1	25	13	0	12	1921	1929	−8	26
30.	Slovakia	4	9	0	32	13	0	19	2612	2733	−121	26
31.	Ukraine	1	5	0	18	10	1	7	1571	1542	29	21
32.	Scotland	5	13	0	38	10	1	27	2977	3512	−535	21
33.	Estonia	2	5	0	24	9	0	15	2123	2180	−57	18
34.	Luxembourg	10	38	0	93	8	1	84	6028	8812	−2784	17
35.	Montenegro	1	1	0	19	8	0	11	1361	1375	−14	16
36.	FYR Macedonia	1	3	0	8	4	0	4	604	622	−18	8
37.	Egypt	3	12	0	28	4	0	24	1997	2686	−689	8
38.	Cyprus	7	14	0	36	4	0	32	2431	3690	−1259	8
39.	Iceland	4	12	0	22	3	0	19	1538	2230	−692	6
40.	Morocco	8	13	0	30	3	0	27	1814	2699	−885	6
41.	Belarus	1	1	0	3	2	0	1	290	252	38	4
42.	Ireland	2	2	0	4	1	0	3	300	408	−108	2
43.	Syria	4	8	0	18	1	0	17	1300	1719	−419	2
44.	Tunisia	1	1	0	0	0	0	0	0	0	0	0
45.	Lebanon	1	1	0	0	0	0	0	0	0	0	0
46.	Norway	2	2	0	4	0	0	4	278	456	−178	0
47.	Northern Ireland	2	5	0	8	0	0	8	342	711	−369	0
48.	Denmark	7	14	0	36	0	0	36	2179	3688	−1509	0

== Euroleague Basketball domestic league rankings (by country) 2000 – 2007 ==
The Euroleague Basketball Company domestic league rankings (by country), from 2000–2007. These were the domestic league rankings that were based on play in the first-tier European competition, the EuroLeague. These rankings were part of the old rating system, which was used from 1958–2007, and included only basketball game competition related results, as a rankings criteria.

Rk	League (by country)	TP	P	CW	GP	W	D	L	PS	PSA	PSD	RP
1.	Spain	7	29	1	561	327	0	234	44371	42618	1753	654
2.	Italy	9	28	1	532	295	0	237	42534	41654	880	590
3.	Greece	6	23	2	426	232	0	194	33490	32889	601	464
4.	Russia	4	9	1	189	133	0	56	15326	14182	1144	266
5.	Turkey	4	13	0	242	129	0	113	18164	18002	162	258
6.	Israel	2	8	2	145	93	0	52	12277	11581	696	186
7.	Slovenia	2	9	0	147	65	0	82	11310	11518	-208	130
8.	France	4	13	0	186	62	0	124	13974	14855	-881	124
9.	Lithuania	2	9	0	136	56	0	80	10696	10885	-189	112
10.	Croatia	3	10	0	148	56	0	92	11429	12036	-607	112
11.	Germany	5	9	0	120	36	0	84	8804	9661	-857	72
12.	Poland	2	6	0	96	33	0	63	6940	7489	-549	66
13.	Serbia	1	6	0	90	28	0	62	6868	7317	-449	56
14.	Belgium	2	3	0	42	12	0	30	3316	3576	-260	24
15.	Montenegro	1	3	0	40	12	0	28	3185	3540	-355	24
16.	Switzerland	1	2	0	10	3	0	7	777	914	-137	6
17.	England	1	2	0	24	1	0	23	1685	2144	-459	2
18.	Sweden	1	1	0	0	0	0	0	0	0	0	0
19.	Portugal	2	2	0	12	0	0	12	896	1181	-285	0

== Overall combined European domestic league rankings (by country) 1958 – 2007 ==
The overall combined European domestic league rankings (by country), from 1958–2007. These were the all-time domestic league rankings that were based on play in all of the European continental-wide club basketball competitions, the EuroLeague, the Saporta Cup, the Korać Cup, the EuroCup, the EuroChallenge, and the EuroCup Challenge. These rankings were part of the old rating system, which was used from 1958–2007, and included only basketball game competition related results, as a rankings criteria.

Rk	League (by country)	TP	P	CW	GP	W	D	L	PS	PSA	PSD	RP
1.	Italy	34	273	38	3262	2038	16	1208	273126	255930	17196	4092
2.	Spain	36	264	27	3171	1988	16	1167	266721	246860	19861	3992
3.	Greece	21	261	13	2548	1457	9	1082	203754	197261	6493	2923
4.	France	37	268	7	2497	1312	13	1172	203001	198372	4629	2637
5.	Russia	21	141	12	1522	929	6	587	126364	119080	7284	1864
6.	Israel	19	197	6	1684	912	6	766	140448	136428	4020	1830
7.	Turkey	26	212	2	1612	826	4	782	124071	124464	-393	1656
8.	Croatia	14	145	10	1442	756	12	674	118639	116319	2320	1524
9.	Belgium	34	215	0	1404	612	13	779	113094	114491	-1397	1237
10.	Serbia	19	117	5	1109	615	3	491	92091	88718	3373	1233
11.	Germany	32	201	2	1355	577	7	771	106843	109839	-2996	1161
12.	Poland	22	116	0	833	388	4	441	65384	66460	-1076	780
13.	Slovenia	18	86	1	764	361	3	400	59738	59857	-119	725
14.	Lithuania	12	70	3	670	345	1	324	54015	52933	1082	691
15.	Czech Republic	13	117	1	678	295	6	377	55156	55923	-767	596
16.	Ukraine	16	72	1	517	258	3	256	42062	41800	262	519
17.	Bulgaria	17	116	0	582	256	7	319	47087	48316	-1229	519
18.	Portugal	20	128	0	693	233	4	456	53339	58281	-4942	470
19.	Netherlands	23	103	0	585	219	6	360	46915	48933	-2018	444
20.	Hungary	23	125	0	535	209	8	318	42986	44644	-1658	426
21.	Latvia	9	35	3	295	153	2	140	24406	24036	370	308
22.	Bosnia-Herzegovina	12	49	1	329	149	4	176	26172	26722	-550	302
23.	Cyprus	13	107	1	462	139	4	319	33244	40229	-6985	282
24.	Austria	22	128	0	485	128	3	354	37331	41980	-4649	259
25.	Switzerland	24	102	0	381	124	3	254	30646	34282	-3636	251
26.	Finland	19	98	0	382	122	2	258	30131	32664	-2533	246
27.	Sweden	18	86	0	356	119	1	236	28652	31144	-2492	239
28.	Romania	12	78	1	314	118	2	194	23741	26118	-2377	238
29.	England	35	82	0	362	112	6	244	28636	31617	-2981	230
30.	Slovakia	10	54	0	266	98	2	166	21163	22145	-982	198
31.	Estonia	6	25	0	180	60	1	119	13960	14973	-1013	121
32.	FYR Macedonia	13	44	0	220	56	2	162	16186	18286	-2100	114
33.	Montenegro	2	12	0	130	54	0	76	10168	10590	-422	108
34.	Georgia	7	22	1	74	25	0	49	5804	6427	-623	50
35.	Albania	6	39	0	94	21	1	72	7144	8508	-1364	43
36.	Iceland	10	34	0	98	19	0	79	7868	9570	-1702	38
37.	Luxembourg	16	111	0	244	16	1	227	16241	23808	-7567	33
38.	Scotland	11	25	0	64	14	2	48	4930	6122	-1192	30
39.	Denmark	10	26	0	78	12	0	66	5404	7409	-2005	24
40.	Belarus	4	9	0	35	10	0	25	2510	2905	-395	20
41.	Azerbaijan	2	4	0	17	4	0	13	1370	1705	-335	8
42.	Egypt	3	19	0	37	4	0	33	2600	3556	-956	8
43.	Morocco	10	16	0	36	3	0	33	2181	3336	-1155	6
44.	Norway	6	8	0	30	2	1	27	2084	2878	-794	5
45.	Ireland	3	3	0	8	2	0	6	582	736	-154	4
46.	Moldova	2	3	0	6	1	0	5	418	520	-102	2
47.	Syria	6	10	0	18	1	0	17	1300	1719	-419	2
48.	Lebanon	1	1	0	0	0	0	0	0	0	0	0
49.	Tunisia	1	1	0	0	0	0	0	0	0	0	0
50.	Wales	1	1	0	2	0	0	2	151	167	-16	0
51.	Armenia	1	1	0	2	0	0	2	130	173	-43	0
52.	Malta	2	2	0	4	0	0	4	227	370	-143	0
53.	San Marino	2	3	0	6	0	0	6	363	604	-241	0
54.	Northern Ireland	2	5	0	8	0	0	8	342	711	-369	0

== Top 3 ranked leagues in the overall combined rankings 1958 – 2007 ==
Rank	League
1.	(Italy) Italian Lega A
2.	(Spain) Spanish ACB
3.	(Greece) Greek GBL

== 2007 – 2012 ranking ==
The rankings, as of 2007, are based on 70 percent basketball game competition results, and 30 percent TV revenues/ratings, attendance figures, and arena capacities. The allocation criteria are based in this ranking.

Rank	League
1.	(Spain) Spanish ACB
2.	(Italy) Italian Serie A
3.	(Greece) Greek GBL
4.	(Russia) Russian PBL / (Russia) Russian Super League 1
5.	(France) French LNB Pro A
6.	(Turkey) Turkish TBL
7.	(Lithuania) Lithuanian LKL
8.	Adriatic ABA League (Bosnia and Herzegovina) (Croatia) (North Macedonia) (Montenegro) (Serbia) (Slovenia) (former (Socialist Federal Republic of Yugoslavia) Yugoslav FFL)
9.	(Serbia) Serbian KLS
10.	(Croatia) Croatian A1 Liga
11.	(Slovenia) Slovenian SKL
12.	(Germany) German BBL
13.	(Poland) Polish PLK
14.	(Belgium) Belgian BLB
15.	(Latvia) Latvian LBL
16.	(Ukraine) Ukrainian SuperLeague
17.	(Israel) Israeli Super League
18.	(Czech Republic) Czech NBL
19.	(Netherlands) Dutch DBL

== 2012 ==
The rankings, as of 2007, are based on 70 percent basketball game competition results, and 30 percent TV revenues/ratings, attendance figures, and arena capacities. The allocation criteria are based in this ranking.

In 2012, Euroleague Basketball decided to update the rankings every year, and take into account the results from the previous seasons.

Rank	National Domestic League
1.	(Spain) Spanish Liga ACB
2.	VTB United League ( Russia) (Belarus) (Estonia) (Finland) (Kazakhstan) (Latvia) (Georgia (country)) (Czech Republic) (Former (Soviet Union) USSR Premier League)
3.	(Turkey) Turkish BSL
4.	(Greece) Greek GBL
5.	(Italy) Italian Serie A
6.	(France) French Pro A
7.	(Lithuania) Lithuanian LKL
8.	(Germany) German BBL
9.	Adriatic ABA League (Bosnia and Herzegovina) (Croatia) (Montenegro) (North Macedonia) (Serbia) (Slovenia) (former (Socialist Federal Republic of Yugoslavia) Yugoslav FFL)
10.	(Poland) Polish PLK
11.	(Belgium) Belgian BLB
12.	(Czech Republic) Czech NBL
13.	(Ukraine) Ukrainian SL Favorit Sport
14.	(Israel) Israeli Premier League
15.	(Bulgaria) Bulgarian NBL
16.	(Netherlands) Dutch DBL
17.	(Latvia) Latvian LBL

== See also ==
- EuroLeague
- EuroCup
- European professional basketball club rankings
