= Basketball Champions League rankings =

Scoring criteria

The Basketball Champions League rankings are the competition's criteria for ordering teams and leagues according to their performance with the aim to give an objective process for determining the participation of clubs each season.

== Ranking calculation ==
The clubs receive 2 points for a win and no points for a defeat from the regular season and the following stages. Bonus points are added to the number of points scored in a season. Since the 2020–21 season, 3 points were awarded instead of 2 points for a regular season win due to the COVID-19 pandemic and the change of competition format.

Bonus points are allocated for:

- Clubs that are eliminated in the qualifying rounds (1 bonus point for the first round, 2 for the second round and 4 for the third round if it is played)
- Clubs that qualify for the regular season of the Champions League (5 bonus points).
- Clubs that qualify for the Play-in round of the Champions League (1 bonus point).
- Clubs that qualify for the round of 16 of the Champions League (5 bonus points). Since the 2021–22 season, only the 8 group winners.
- Clubs that qualify for the quarterfinals of the Champions League (3 bonus points).
- Clubs that qualify for the Final Four of the Champions League (4 bonus points and 1 additional point if finishes third, 2 if second and 4 if it wins the competition).

== Country coefficient ==
The country coefficient is used to rank the basketball leagues of Europe, and thus determine the maximum number of clubs from an association that will participate in the Basketball Champions League. This coefficient is determined by the results of the clubs of the leagues in the Basketball Champions League games over the past three seasons. The number of points awarded each season is divided by the number of clubs that participated for that association in that season. This number is then rounded up to one decimal place (e.g. 2 2/3 would be rounded to 2.7).

=== Current ranking ===
The ranking below takes into account of each league's performance in European competitions from 2022–23 to 2024–25.

As of May 14, 2026 the ranking is as follows:

Ranking 2026	Ranking 2025	League	Coefficient				Teams
Ranking 2026	Ranking 2025	League	2023-24	2024-25	2025-26	Total	Teams
1	1	Spain	32.20	34.00	34.00	101.20	0/5
2	2	Turkey	20.40	27.75	20.50	68.65	0/4
3	5	Greece	27.00	17.00	21.75	65.75	0/4
4	7	(Czech Republic) Czechia	5.00	38.00	22.00	65.00	0/1
5	3	France	23.25	16.00	23.33	62.58	0/3
6	6	Germany	18.50	15.25	19.50	53.25	0/4
7	4	Israel	20.00	17.00	15.00	52.00	0/2
8	9	Lithuania	9.50	15.50	25.50	50.50	0/2
9	8	Italy	10.25	22.67	12.33	45.25	0/3
10	10	Hungary	11.00	19.00	9.00	39.00	0/2
11	14	Latvia	11.00	8.00	8.00	27.00	0/1
12	13	Bosnia and Herzegovina	5.00	11.00	8.00	24.00	0/1
13	12	Portugal	8.00	8.00	8.00	21.00	0/2
14	11	Belgium	9.00	7.50	4.50	21.00	0/2
15	17	Serbia	1.00	4.50	15.00	20.50	0/1
16	20	Slovakia	1.00	2.00	17.00	20.00	0/1
17	15	Poland	6.50	6.50	6.00	19.00	0/2
18	32	Azerbaijan	0.00	1.00	8.00	9.00	0/1
19	21	Estonia	1.00	4.00	2.00	7.00	0/1
20	18	Switzerland	1.00	4.00	1.00	6.00	0/1
21	23	Netherlands	2.00	1.00	2.00	5.00	0/1
22	16	Denmark	1.00	0.00	4.00	5.00	0/1
23	19	Sweden	2.00	2.00	0.00	4.00	0/0
24	22	Romania	1.00	2.00	1.00	4.00	0/1
25	26	Kosovo	1.00	2.00	1.00	4.00	0/1
26	25	Finland	1.00	1.00	1.00	3.00	0/1
27	24	Cyprus	1.00	1.00	1.00	3.00	0/1
28	29	(Georgia (country)) Georgia	1.00	1.00	1.00	3.00	0/1
29	27	Bulgaria	0.00	2.00	1.00	3.00	0/1
30	28	(United Kingdom) Great Britain	1.00	1.00	0.00	2.00	0/0
31	33	Montenegro	1.00	0.00	1.00	2.00	0/1
32	34	North Macedonia	0.00	0.00	1.00	1.00	0/1
	— (NR)	Ukraine	0.00	0.00	0.00	0.00	0/0
	— (NR)	Austria	0.00	0.00	0.00	0.00	0/0
	— (NR)	Russia	0.00	0.00	0.00	0.00	0/0
	— (NR)	Belarus	0.00	0.00	0.00	0.00	0/0
	— (NR)	Croatia	0.00	0.00	0.00	0.00	0/0
	— (NR)	Albania	0.00	0.00	0.00	0.00	0/0
	— (NR)	Armenia	0.00	0.00	0.00	0.00	0/0
	— (NR)	Iceland	0.00	0.00	0.00	0.00	0/0
	— (NR)	(Republic of Ireland) Ireland	0.00	0.00	0.00	0.00	0/0
	— (NR)	Luxembourg	0.00	0.00	0.00	0.00	0/0
	— (NR)	Malta	0.00	0.00	0.00	0.00	0/0
	— (NR)	Moldova	0.00	0.00	0.00	0.00	0/0
	— (NR)	Norway	0.00	0.00	0.00	0.00	0/0
	— (NR)	Slovenia	0.00	0.00	0.00	0.00	0/0

Indicates active countries which have all their teams still competing in this year's Basketball Champions League.
Indicates active countries which have some teams still competing in this year's Basketball Champions League.
Indicates countries which have no teams remaining in this year's Basketball Champions League.

^{NR} No rank (league did not enter in any of the seasons used for computing coefficients)

=== Top leagues by period ===
The following data indicates the three top-ranked leagues in each three-year period.

Years	1st Place	Coeff.	2nd Place	Coeff.	3rd Place	Coeff.
2016–2019	(Spain) Liga ACB	101.75	(France) LNB Pro A	91.25	(Turkey) Super League	90.75
2017–2020	(Spain) Liga ACB	86.75	(Greece) Basket League	81.75	(Czech Republic) National Basketball League	81.67
2018–2021	(Spain) Liga ACB	105.50	(Czech Republic) National Basketball League	94.67	(Russia) VTB United League	87.00

The table shows the ranking of nations with respect to the total number of years in the top three of the rankings:

League	1st	2nd	3rd	Total
(Spain) Liga ACB	3	0	0	3
(Czech Republic) National Basketball League	0	1	1	2
(France) LNB Pro A	0	1	0	1
(Greece) Basket League	0	1	0	1
(Turkey) Basketball Super League	0	0	1	1
(Russia) VTB United League	0	0	1	1

== Club ranking ==
The club coefficient is either the sum of the points earned by the club in the Basketball Champions League over the previous three seasons. This ranking is used by the BCL to determine a club's seeding in club competition draws.

=== Current ranking ===
The top 25 clubs as of October 2025 are as follows:

Ranking	Club	League	Points			
Ranking	Club	League	2022–23	2023–24	2024–25	Total
1	Unicaja	Spain	46	53	57	156
2	La Laguna Tenerife	Spain	46	45	51	142
3	UCAM Murcia	Spain	33	47	31	111
4	Telekom Baskets Bonn	Germany	56	34	18	108
5	AEK	Greece	32	25	46	103
6	Galatasaray	Turkey	26	23	45	94
7	Hapoel Bank Yahav Jerusalem	Israel	50	31	0	81
8	Rytas	Lithuania	25	18	29	72
9	Hapoel Netanel Holon	Israel	24	27	17	68
10	Peristeri Domino's	Greece	17	36	12	65
11	BAXI Manresa	Spain	33	0	29	62
12	SIG Strasbourg	France	35	26	0	61
13	Bertram Derthona Basket	Italy	0	21	36	57
14	Karşıyaka	Turkey	12	23	18	53
15	JDA Bourgogne Dijon	France	23	29	0	52
16	ERA Nymburk	Czech Republic	11	0	38	49
17	Filou Oostende	Belgium	17	17	14	48
17	MHP Riesen Ludwigsburg	Germany	20	28	0	48
17	Promitheas Patras Vikos Cola	Greece	0	30	18	48
20	Falco-Vulcano Szombathely	Hungary	11	11	19	41
21	Pallacanestro Reggiana	Italy	11	0	28	39
22	Darüşşafaka	Turkey	20	17	0	37
22	Tofaş	Turkey	12	25	0	37
24	PAOK mateco	Greece	14	17	4	35
25	SL Benfica	Portugal	18	8	8	34

Indicates teams still active in this year's Basketball Champions League.
Indicates teams still active in this year's Basketball Champions League qualifying rounds.
Indicates teams no longer active in this year's Basketball Champions League.
Indicates teams that do not take part in this year's Basketball Champions League.

=== Top club by period ===
The following data indicate the top-ranked clubs in each 3-year period.

Years	Club	Points
2016–2019	(Spain) Iberostar Tenerife	137
2017–2020	(Greece) AEK	132
2018–2021	(Spain) Lenovo Tenerife	133
2019–2022	(Spain) Lenovo Tenerife	123
2020–2023	(Spain) Lenovo Tenerife	139

Top-rated clubs listed by number of times they were top-ranked over a 3-year period:

Rank	Club	Total
1	(Spain) Lenovo Tenerife	4
2	(Greece) AEK	1

== See also ==
- Historical European national basketball league rankings
