= Kasey Shepherd =

American basketball player (born 1994)

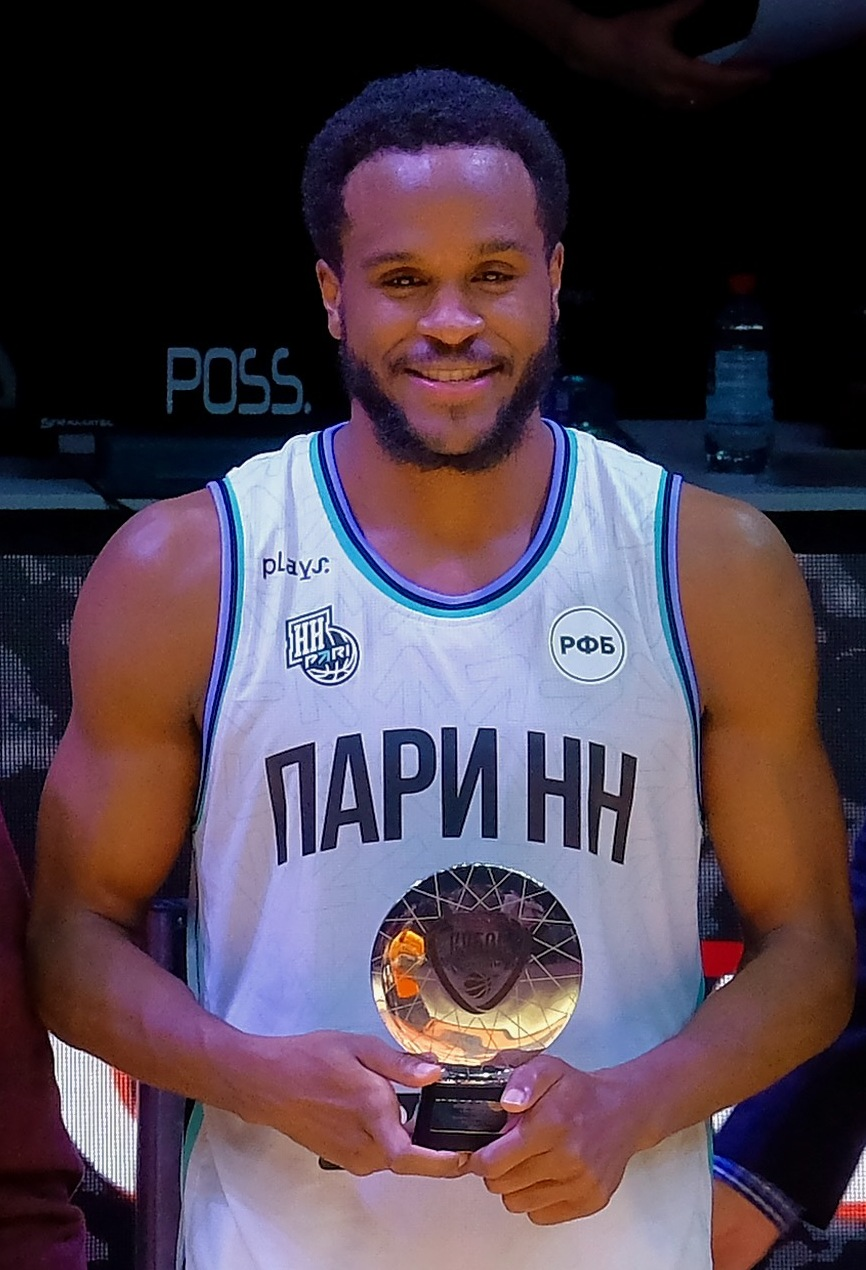
- Shepard in 2024 at Nizhny Novgorod

No. 8 – Bosna
- Position: Guard
- League: Bosnian League; ABA League; EuroCup

Personal information
- Born: June 5, 1994 (age 32) Houston, Texas, U.S.
- Listed height: 6 ft 3 in (1.91 m)
- Listed weight: 180 lb (82 kg)

Career information
- High school: Dekaney High School
- College: Louisiana–Lafayette (2012–2016)
- NBA draft: 2016: undrafted
- Playing career: 2017–present

Career history
- 2017–2018: Ulcinj
- 2018: Kaposvár
- 2019: Basco Batumi
- 2019–2020: Kyiv-Basket
- 2020–2021: Nizhny Novgorod
- 2021–2022: Tofaş
- 2022: Bahçeşehir Koleji
- 2022–2023: U-BT Cluj-Napoca
- 2023: Hapoel Afula
- 2023–2025: Nizhny Novgorod
- 2025–2026: Ironi Ness Ziona
- 2026–present: Bosna

Kasey Juwan Shepherd (born June 5, 1994) is an American professional basketball player for Bosna of the Bosnian League, the ABA League, and the EuroCup. He plays as a guard, and has competed for multiple clubs across Europe since beginning his professional career in 2017.

== Early life and college ==
Shepherd was born in Houston, Texas and attended Dekaney High School in Houston. He played college basketball for the Louisiana Ragin' Cajuns from 2012 to 2016, where he was a consistent contributor at guard, averaging double-figure minutes and scoring during his tenure with the team.

== Professional career ==
After going undrafted in the 2016 NBA Draft, Shepherd began his professional career in Europe. He signed with Ulcinj in Montenegro for the 2017–18 season before moving to Kaposvári in Hungary in 2018. He had short stints with Basco Batumi in Georgia in 2019 and then Kyiv-Basket in Ukraine for the 2019–20 season.

For the 2020–21 season, Shepherd joined Nizhny Novgorod, where he played in the Basketball Champions League and became one of the team's key contributors. During his time there, he was among the team's leading scorers and playmakers, highlighted by several standout performances in European competition.

In the 2021–22 season, he signed with Tofaş in Turkey and later played for Bahçeşehir Koleji. He then joined U-BT Cluj-Napoca in Romania and Hapoel Afula in Israel before returning to Nizhny Novgorod for the 2023–24 season. In December 2025 he joined former EuroLeague champion Bosna.

== Playing style ==
Shepherd is known for his scoring ability and versatility as a guard, capable of both facilitating for teammates and creating his own shot. He has contributed across multiple statistical categories in various European leagues, including points, rebounds, assists, and steals.
