= European professional basketball club rankings =

The European professional basketball club rankings are determined by the results of the professional basketball clubs in the EuroLeague and the EuroCup over the previous three seasons, excluding the competition's qualifying rounds. This ranking is not exhaustive and does not include all European clubs as it is based on closed league participation. The FIBA proposes its own alternative rankings.

The clubs receive two points for a win and one point for a tie or loss in games of the main stages (and onwards) of the EuroLeague and the EuroCup. Qualifying round results are not taken into account. Clubs also receive two bonus points for reaching the Top 16 stage of the EuroCup, two bonus points for reaching the quarterfinals, one bonus point for reaching the semifinals, and 1 bonus point for reaching the Finals.

In case of a tie, the club with more wins in the last three seasons will rank higher. Should a tie persist, the ranking in the last EuroLeague or EuroCup season will determine the positions.

== Current ranking ==
The top clubs in the current rankings are as follows (updated to June 26, 2026):

Rank 2027	Rank 2026	Mvmt.	Club	Country	2024-25	2025-26	2026-27	Points	LC rank
1	1	—	Olympiacos	Greece	70	78		148	1
2	2	—	Real Madrid	Spain	63	76		139	2
3	4	+1	Fenerbahçe	Turkey	71	72		143	3
4	3	−1	Panathinaikos	Greece	67	70		137	4
5	5	—	Monaco	France	69	67		136	—
6	6	—	FC Barcelona	Spain	63	60		123	5
7	7	—	Valencia Basket	Spain	45	74		119	—
8	8	—	Žalgiris	Lithuania	49	67		116	6
9	16	+7	Hapoel Tel Aviv	Israel	46	68		114	—
10	10	—	Paris Basketball	France	60	53		113	—
11	14	+3	Bayern Munich	Germany	56	55		111	10
12	11	−1	Anadolu Efes	Turkey	62	49		111	7
13	13	—	Crvena zvezda	Serbia	52	58		110	—
14	15	−1	Olimpia Milano	Italy	51	54		105	11
15	17	+2	Partizan	Serbia	50	52		102	—
16	9	−7	Maccabi Tel Aviv	Israel	45	54		99	8
17	12	−5	Baskonia	Spain	48	51		99	9
18	18	—	Virtus Bologna	Italy	43	52		95	—
19	19	—	ASVEL	France	46	45		91	12
20	29	+9	Bahçeşehir Koleji	Turkey	42	39		81	—
21	22	+1	Türk Telekom	Turkey	35	43		78	—
22	20	−2	JL Bourg	France	29	48		77	—
23	21	−2	Beşiktaş	Turkey	31	44		75	—
24	24	—	Cedevita Olimpija	Slovenia	34	37		71	—
25	34	+9	Hapoel Jerusalem	Israel	34	35		69	—
26	23	−3	U-BT Cluj-Napoca	Romania	35	33		68	—
27	25	−2	Reyer Venezia	Italy	30	32		62	—
28	27	−1	Aquila Basket Trento	Italy	24	37		61	—
29	26	−3	Budućnost	Montenegro	28	33		61	—
30	39	+9	Dubai Basketball	United Arab Emirates	0	56		56	—
31	29	−2	Ratiopharm Ulm	Germany	28	27		55	—
32	30	−2	Aris	Greece	21	27		48	—
33	33	—	Lietkabelis	Lithuania	22	23		45	—
34	36	+2	Hamburg Towers	Germany	25	20	0	45	—
35	31	−4	Gran Canaria	Spain	45	0	0	45	—
36	32	−4	ALBA Berlin	Germany	37	0	0	37	—
37	42	+5	Manresa	Spain	0	32		32	—
38	43	+5	Niners Chemnitz	Germany	0	30		30	—
39	38	−1	Wolves	Lithuania	30	0	0	30	—
40	37	−3	Joventut	Spain	27	0	0	27	—
41	44	+3	Neptūnas	Lithuania	0	26		26	—
42	35	−7	London Lions	United Kingdom	0	24		24	—
43	40	−3	WKS Śląsk Wrocław	Poland	0	23		23	—
44	45	+1	Panionios	Greece	0	20	0	20	—
45	46	−1	Trefl Sopot	Poland	19	0	0	19	—
46	N/A	N/A	Balkan	(Bulgarian Basketball Federation) Bulgaria	0	0		0	—
47	N/A	N/A	Canarias Tenerife	Spain	0	0		0	—
48	47	−1	CSKA Moscow^{a}	Russia	0	0	0	0	13
49	N/A	N/A	Derthona Tortona	Italy	0	0		0	—
50	N/A	N/A	Le Mans Sarthe	France	0	0		0	—
51	N/A	N/A	Maxima Roma	Italy	0	0		0	—
52	N/A	N/A	Napoli Basket	Italy	0	0		0	—
53	N/A	N/A	PAOK	Greece	0	0		0	—
54	N/A	N/A	Rīgas Zeļļi	(Latvian Basketball Association) Latvia	0	0		0	—
55	N/A	N/A	Roma SPQR	Italy	0	0		0	—
56	N/A	N/A	Rostock Seawolves	Germany	0	0		0	—
57	N/A	N/A	San Pablo Burgos	Spain	0	0		0	—
58	N/A	N/A	Skyliners Frankfurt	Germany	0	0		0	—
59	N/A	N/A	Šiauliai	Lithuania	0	0		0	—
60	N/A	N/A	Tofaş	Turkey	0	0		0	—

Indicates teams still competing in this season's EuroLeague or EuroCup.

Notes

^a CSKA Moscow is suspended from season 2021-22 because of the 2022 Russian invasion of Ukraine.

== Minimum points ranking ==
Minimum points ranking is a method for calculating points for every country association participated in Euroleague and Eurocup competitions in the last three-year period. It represents results of the worst-performing team from each country/league that will be added together every year to create a position for that country/league. This is the lowest possible position that any club from that country/league can occupy in the draw. Main purpose is to rank teams (that haven't participated in the last three-year period) for the Eurocup draw.

Rank 2026	Country	2023-24	2024-25	2025-26	Points
1	France	43	29	45	117
2	Israel	36	34	35	105
3	Romania	35	35	33	103
4	Turkey	29	31	39	99
5	Spain	33	27	32	92
6	Italy	26	24	32	82
7	(European Union) ABA League	19	28	33	80
8	Greece	30	21	20	71
9	Lithuania	24	22	23	69
10	United Kingdom	41	0	24	65
11	Germany	20	25	20	65
12	Poland	20	19	23	62
13	Ukraine	35	0	0	35

=== Eurocup 2026-27 rankings for draw ===
Pot 1
Team	Pts
(France) AS Monaco	202
(French Federation of Basketball) Cosea JL Bourg	119
(French Federation of Basketball) Le Mans Sarthe	117^{†}
(Turkey) Türk Telekom	107

Pot 2
Team	Pts
(Israeli Basketball Association) Hapoel Jerusalem	105^{†}
(Romanian Basketball Federation) U-BT Cluj-Napoca	103
(Turkey) Bahçeşehir	99^{†}
(Turkey) Tofaş	99^{†}

Pot 3
Team	Pts
(Spanish Basketball Federation) La Laguna Tenerife	92^{†}
(Spanish Basketball Federation) Kids&Us Manresa	92^{†}
(Spanish Basketball Federation) San Pablo Burgos	92^{†}
(Basketball Federation of Montenegro) Budućnost VOLI	88

Pot 4
Team	Pts
(Basketball Federation of Slovenia) Cedevita Olimpija	90
(Italian Basketball Federation) Reyer Venezia	89
(Italian Basketball Federation) Dolomiti Energia Trento	87
(Germany) ratiopharm Ulm	80

Pot 5
Team	Pts
(Italian Basketball Federation) Maxima Roma	82^{†}
(Italian Basketball Federation) Derthona Tortona	82^{†}
(Italian Basketball Federation) Napoli Basket	82^{†}
(Italian Basketball Federation) BC Roma SPQR	82^{†}

Pot 6
Team	Pts
(Hellenic Basketball Federation) Aris Betsson	78
(Lithuanian Basketball Federation) Lietkabelis	69
(Lithuanian Basketball Federation) Neptūnas	69^{†}
(Lithuanian Basketball Federation) Šiauliai	69^{†}

Pot 7
Team	Pts
(Hellenic Basketball Federation) PAOK	71^{†}
(British Basketball) London Lions	65
(Germany) Niners Chemnitz	65^{†}
(Germany) Rostock Seawolves	65^{†}

Pot 8
Team	Pts
(Germany) Skyliners Frankfurt	65^{†}
(Polish Basketball Federation) Śląsk Wrocław	62^{†}
(Bulgarian Basketball Federation) Balkan	0^{†}
(Latvian Basketball Association) Rīgas Zeļļi	0^{†}

Notes

^† Indicates teams with points applying the minimum for the league they play.

1. Roma Maxima: The club took part in last season's competition as Germani Brescia.
2. Roma SPQR: The club took part in last season's competition as Vanoli Basket Cremona.

== Top club by period ==
The top-ranked clubs in each 3-year period listed by year:

Years	Club	Ranking
2008–2011	(Spain) FC Barcelona	132
2009–2012	(Spain) FC Barcelona	131
2010–2013	(Spain) FC Barcelona	144
2011–2014	(Russia) CSKA Moscow	164
2012–2015	(Russia) CSKA Moscow	178
2013–2016	(Russia) CSKA Moscow	178
2014–2017	(Russia) CSKA Moscow	186
2015–2018	(Russia) CSKA Moscow	193
2016–2019	(Russia) CSKA Moscow	205
2017–2020	(Russia) CSKA Moscow	186
2018–2021	(Turkey) Anadolu Efes	191
2019–2022	(Spain) FC Barcelona	184
2020–2023	(Spain) FC Barcelona	200
2021–2024	(Spain) Real Madrid	206
2022–2025	(Spain) Real Madrid	208
2023–2026	(Greece) Olympiacos	213

== Lithuanian professional basketball club rankings ==
The Lithuanian professional basketball clubs in the current rankings are as follows (updated to June 2026):

Rank 2026	Rank 2025	Mvmt.	League	Club	2023-24	2024-25	2025-26	Points "TP"	Adjusted Points
1	N/A	N/A	LKL	Kauno „Žalgiris“	75	92	83	250	250
2	N/A	N/A	LKL	Vilniaus „Rytas“	78	88	56	222	222
3	N/A	N/A	LKL	Panevėžio „Lietkabelis“	64	77	62	203	203
4	N/A	N/A	LKL	Klaipėdos „Neptūnas“	50	54	68	172	172
5	N/A	N/A	LKL	Utenos „Juventus“	54	56	62	172	172
6	N/A	N/A	NKL	Marijampolės Sūduva	91	72	97	260	161
7	N/A	N/A	LKL	Jonavos „Jonava Hipocredit“	45	70	45	160	160
8	N/A	N/A	LKL	Šiaulių „Šiauliai“	38	54	53	145	145
9	N/A	N/A	NKL	Šakių Vytis-VDU	69	74	86	229	142
10	N/A	N/A	NKL	Vilkaviškio Perlas Go	68	85	76	229	142
11	N/A	N/A	NKL	Jurbarkas-Karys	84	69	75	228	141
12	N/A	N/A	NKL	Palangos Olimpas	96	78	63	228	141
13	N/A	N/A	NKL	Telšių Telšiai	73	87	63	223	138
14	N/A	N/A	NKL	Kauno Žalgiris-2	58	84	73	215	133
15	N/A	N/A	LKL	Vilniaus „Wolves“	71	60	0	131	131
16	N/A	N/A	NKL	Kretingos Kretinga-Rivile	82	53	73	208	129
17	N/A	N/A	LKL	Kėdainių „Nevėžis - Paskolų klubas“	40	47	40	127	127
18	N/A	N/A	NKL	Klaipėdos Neptūnas-Akvaservis	50	57	92	199	123
19	N/A	N/A	LKL / NKL	Mažeikių „M Basket“	45	39	61	145	122
20	N/A	N/A	RKL A RKL B	Birštono „Milasta“	63	58	70	191	121
21	N/A	N/A	RKL A	Tauragės „Tauragė“	65	70	64	199	120
22	N/A	N/A	RKL A RKL B	Gargždų SC	47	63	64	174	115
23	N/A	N/A	RKL A NKL	Kauno r. Omega-Tauras	62	69	55	186	114
24	N/A	N/A	RKL B	BC „Radviliškis“	59	59	45	163	113
25	N/A	N/A	RKL A	Prienų „Tikodenta“	63	50	66	179	108
26	N/A	N/A	NKL	Vilniaus Rytas-2	63	60	49	172	107
27	N/A	N/A	NKL	Ukmergės Stekas	63	60	49	172	107
28	N/A	N/A	RKL A	Šilalės „Lūšis“	50	30	68	178	107
29	N/A	N/A	RKL A	Raseinių „Raseiniai“	59	64	53	176	106
30	N/A	N/A	RKL A NKL	Plungės Olimpas	65	50	54	169	103
31	N/A	N/A	NKL	Šilutės Šilutė-PDS.lt	48	51	66	165	102
32	N/A	N/A	RKL A	Vytauto Didžiojo universitetas	40	65	66	168	101
33	N/A	N/A	RKL B	Utenos „Dauniškio prekyba-Juventus“	53	49	44	146	101
34	N/A	N/A	RKL A	Biržų „Biržai“	65	60	40	165	100
35	N/A	N/A	NKL RKL A	Joniškio Delikatesas	71	43	53	167	96
36	N/A	N/A	RKL A	KK „Kupiškis“	49	57	52	158	95
37	N/A	N/A	RKL B	Skuodo „KKSC-Kuršasta“	53	46	38	137	95
38	N/A	N/A	RKL A	LCC tarptautinis universitetas	42	52	61	155	94
39	N/A	N/A	RKL A	Kazlų Rūdos SC „Ataka-Danilus“	50	55	46	151	91
40	N/A	N/A	RKL B	Jonavos SC	47	36	47	130	90
41	N/A	N/A	RKL A RKLB	BC „Širvintos UHB-Group“	0	60	75	135	86
42	N/A	N/A	RKL B	Kauno raj. „Tornado KM-Tauras“	34	49	41	124	86
43	N/A	N/A	RKL B	KK „Trakai-Trakų SC“	26	46	49	121	84
44	N/A	N/A	RKL A	Kauno „Žalgiris-3“	60	39	37	136	82
45	N/A	N/A	RKL B	Kauno technologijos universitetas	42	39	36	117	81
46	N/A	N/A	RKL B	Klaipėdos „VKKM-Neptūnas“	38	49	30	117	81
47	N/A	N/A	RKL A	Kėdainių SC	62	69	0	131	79
48	N/A	N/A	RKL B	Anykščių „KKSC-Elmis“	41	42	31	114	79
49	N/A	N/A	RKL A	Vilniaus „Rytas-MRU“	48	40	39	127	77
50	N/A	N/A	RKL B	Vilniaus rajono KK-VRSC	0	59	52	111	77
51	N/A	N/A	RKL B	VDU sporto studijos	41	40	28	109	75
52	N/A	N/A	RKL A	Akmenės SC	41	37	42	120	72
53	N/A	N/A	RKL B	Šiaulių KA „Saulė-ŠSG“	43	38	23	104	72
54	N/A	N/A	RKL B	Pakruojo SC „Lygumų-ŽŪB“	37	34	28	99	68
55	N/A	N/A	RKL B	Kaišiadorių „Savingė“	34	40	24	98	68
56	N/A	N/A	RKL B	Vilniaus KM	38	38	21	97	67
57	N/A	N/A	RKL B	Švenčionėlių „Rida“	28	34	27	89	61
58	N/A	N/A	NKL	Alytaus Alytus	0	46	48	94	58
59	N/A	N/A	RKL A RKL B	Druskininkų „Druskininkai“	54	35	0	89	58
60	N/A	N/A	RKL B	Lietuvos sporto universitetas	30	25	28	83	57
61	N/A	N/A	RKL A	Kuršėnų SM-„Grafų baldai“	41	48	0	49	54
62	N/A	N/A	RKL B	LKSK-Gijos Klinikos	26	28	21	75	52
63	N/A	N/A	LKL	Gargždų „Gargždai“	0	0	51	51	51
64	N/A	N/A	RKL B	Ukmergės „SC-Jusema“	0	39	28	67	46
65	N/A	N/A	NKL	Kėdainių sporto centras	0	0	63	63	39
66	N/A	N/A	RKL B	Marijampolės SC	28	29	0	57	39
67	N/A	N/A	RKL B	Trakai-MAGNUS	57	0	0	57	39
68	N/A	N/A	RKL B	Klaipėdos Universitetas-KKM	0	28	24	52	36
69	N/A	N/A	LKL	Pasvalio „Pieno žvaigždės“	35	0	0	35	35
70	N/A	N/A	NKL	Kauno r. Atletas	56	0	0	56	35
71	N/A	N/A	RKL A	Druskininkų „Akvilė“	0	0	56	34	34
72	N/A	N/A	RKL B	Varėnos „Glassbee-KRS“	0	27	19	46	32
73	N/A	N/A	RKL B	Palangos SC	0	29	17	46	32
74	N/A	N/A	RKL B	Panevėžio „Panevėžys“	0	28	17	45	31
75	N/A	N/A	RKL B	Molėtų „Ežerūnas“	38	0	0	32	22
76	N/A	N/A	RKL B	Raseinių „Brosta-KKSC“	32	0	0	32	22
77	N/A	N/A	RKL B	Prienų SC-Pauresta	0	0	31	31	21
78	N/A	N/A	RKL B	Alytus SRC	31	0	0	31	21
79	N/A	N/A	RKL B	KK Pašvitinys	31	0	0	31	21
80	N/A	N/A	RKL B	Kauno kolegija	0	0	29	29	20
81	N/A	N/A	RKL B	Lazdijų „Briedis-Pietų Megrame“	0	0	27	27	19
82	N/A	N/A	RKL B	Kauno „Žalgiris-Nordclinic“	0	0	26	26	18
83	N/A	N/A	RKL B	Pajūrio „Jūra“	0	0	21	21	15
84	N/A	N/A	RKL B	Alytaus sporto centras	0	0	19	19	13

League	Coefficient "C"	Avg. Points "LA"	Adjusted Points
LKL	1	147	Points = TP/LA • LKL"LA" • C
NKL	0.7	165	Points = TP/LA • LKL"LA" • C
RKL A	0.5	121	Points = TP/LA • LKL"LA" • C
RKL B	0.35	74	Points = TP/LA • LKL"LA" • C

== Spanish professional basketball club rankings ==
The Spanish professional basketball clubs in the current rankings are as follows (updated to 2026-06-15):

Rank 2026	Rank 2025	Mvmt.	Club	2023-24	2024-25	2025-26	Points
1	N/A	N/A	Real Madrid	82	85	66	233
2	N/A	N/A	Valencia Basket	60	76	73+	209
3	N/A	N/A	Barça	67	60	73+	200
4	N/A	N/A	Unicaja	76	70	51	197
5	N/A	N/A	UCAM Murcia	75	51	65	191
6	N/A	N/A	La Laguna Tenerife	59	69	63	191
7	N/A	N/A	Asisa Joventut	50	58	67	175
8	N/A	N/A	Kosner Baskonia	52	57	65	174
9	N/A	N/A	Dreamland Gran Canaria	58	57	44	159
10	N/A	N/A	Baxi Manresa	57	51	50	158
11	N/A	N/A	Surne Bilbao	47	45	57	149
12	N/A	N/A	Bàsquet Girona	47	46	48	141
13	N/A	N/A	Río Breogán	45	47	49	141
14	N/A	N/A	MoraBanc Andorra	47	48	44	139
15	N/A	N/A	Casademont Zaragoza	47	47	44	138
16	N/A	N/A	Coviran Granada	45	43	40	128
17	N/A	N/A	Hiopos Lleida	0	45	46	91
18	N/A	N/A	Monbus Obradoiro	45	0	0	45
19	N/A	N/A	Leyma Coruña	0	41	0	41
20	N/A	N/A	Zunder Palencia	40	0	0	40

League	Coefficient "C"	Avg. Points "LA"	Adjusted Points
ACB	1	147	Points = TP/LA • ACB "LA" • C
Primera	0.7	N/A	Points = TP/LA • ACB "LA" • C
Segunda	0.5	N/A	Points = TP/LA • ACB "LA" • C
Tercera	0.35	N/A	Points = TP/LA • ACB "LA" • C

== France professional basketball club rankings ==
The France professional basketball clubs in the current rankings are as follows: (updated to 2026-06-15):

Rank 2026	Rank 2025	Mvmt.	Club	2023-24	2024-25	2025-26	Points "TP"
1	N/A	N/A	AS Monaco	85	76	66	227
2	N/A	N/A	Paris Basketball	79	76	68	223
3	N/A	N/A	LDLC ASVEL	73	65	61	199
4	N/A	N/A	JL Bourg	72	58	52	182
5	N/A	N/A	Nanterre 92	60	41	63	164
6	N/A	N/A	Cholet	57	55	57	169
7	N/A	N/A	Le Mans Sarthe	49	54	53	156
8	N/A	N/A	SIG Strasbourg	49	42	53	144
9	N/A	N/A	Élan Chalon	48	49	46	143
10	N/A	N/A	JDA Dijon	50	51	42	143
11	N/A	N/A	SLUC Nancy	50	44	43	137
12	N/A	N/A	Saint-Quentin	55	43	38	136
13	N/A	N/A	Limoges CSP	46	40	41	127
14	N/A	N/A	BCM Gravelines-Dunkerque	46	42	38	126
15	N/A	N/A	ESSM Le Portel	55	38	29	122
16	N/A	N/A	Blois	45	0	0	45
17	N/A	N/A	Roanne	44	0	0	44
18	N/A	N/A	Boulazac	0	0	42	42
19	N/A	N/A	Metropolitans 92	38	0	0	38
20	N/A	N/A	Stade Rochelais	0	34	0	34

League	Coefficient "C"	Avg. Points "LA"	Adjusted Points
LNB É	1	130	Points = TP/LA • LNB E"LA" • C
LNB É2	0.7	N/A	Points = TP/LA • LNB E"LA" • C
NM1	0.5	N/A	Points = TP/LA • LNB E"LA" • C

== See also ==
- EuroLeague
- EuroCup Basketball
- Basketball Champions League rankings
- Historical European national basketball league rankings
