= 2015–16 Eurocup Basketball Last 32 =

The 2015–16 Eurocup Basketball Last 32 was played from 5 January to 10 February 2016. A total of 32 teams competed in the Last 32 to decide the 16 places in the eighthfinals.

== Format ==
In each group, teams played against each other home-and-away in a round-robin format. The two first qualified teams advanced to the knockout stage, while the two last qualified teams were eliminated. The rounds were 5–6 January, 12–13 January, 19–20 January, 26–27 January, 2–3 February and 9–10 February 2016.

=== Tiebreakers ===
If teams are level on record at the end of the Last 32, tiebreakers are applied in the following order:

1. Head-to-head record.
2. Head-to-head point differential.
3. Point differential during the Last 32.
4. Points scored during the Last 32.
5. Sum of quotients of points scored and points allowed in each Last 32 match.

== Groups ==
=== Group G ===
Pos	Team	Pld	W	L	PF	PA	PD	Qualification
1	(Germany) Bayern Munich	6	4	2	476	454	+22	Advance to Eighthfinals
2	(Turkey) Banvit	6	4	2	487	455	+32	Advance to Eighthfinals
3	(Spain) Dominion Bilbao Basket	6	3	3	483	464	+19	
4	(Germany) ratiopharm Ulm	6	1	5	435	508	−73	

Source: Eurocup Basketball

6 January 2016	ratiopharm Ulm (Germany)	75–93	(Spain) Dominion Bilbao Basket	Ulm, Germany
17:00 (CET)	Scoring by quarter: 18–25, 23–19, 12–27, 22–22
	Pts: Braun 11; Rebs: Babb 5 Asts: Braun 5 PIR: Braun 15	Boxscore	Pts: Hannah 20; Rebs: Mumbrú 5 Asts: Bertāns 5 PIR: Ruoff 24	Arena: ratiopharm Arena; Referees: Eddie Viator (FRA), Luís Lopes (POR), Josip Radojković (CRO)

6 January 2016	Banvit (Turkey)	83–85	(Germany) Bayern Munich	Bandırma, Turkey
18:00 (CET)	Scoring by quarter: 22–25, 15–22, 28–21, 18–17
	Pts: Johnson, Moerman 17; Rebs: Moerman 11; Asts: Fortson 5 PIR: Moerman 27	Boxscore	Pts: Renfroe, Zipser 14; Rebs: Thompson 8 Asts: Renfroe, Đedović 4 PIR: Zipser 20	Arena: Banvit Kara Ali Acar Sport Hall; Referees: Panagiotis Anastopoulos (GRE), Sérgio Silva (POR), Ilya Putenko (RUS)

13 January 2016	Bayern Munich (Germany)	83–69	(Germany) ratiopharm Ulm	Munich, Germany
20:00 (CET)	Scoring by quarter: 22–19, 26–17, 18–16, 17–17
	Pts: Taylor 18; Rebs: Savanović 6 Asts: Renfroe 5 PIR: Taylor 19	Boxscore	Pts: Morgan 23; Rebs: Morgan 7 Asts: Günther 6 PIR: Morgan 25	Arena: Audi Dome; Referees: Nicola Maestre (FRA), Carlos Peruga (ESP), Uroš Obrknežević (SRB)

13 January 2016	Dominion Bilbao Basket (Spain)	76–85	(Turkey) Banvit	Bilbao, Spain
20:30 (CET)	Scoring by quarter: 16–19, 28–17, 17–17, 15–32
	Pts: Bertāns 15; Rebs: Bogris 8 Asts: three players 2 PIR: Bogris 16	Boxscore	Pts: Moerman 25; Rebs: Simmons 5 Asts: Fortson 6 PIR: Moerman 30	Arena: Bilbao Arena; Referees: Srđan Dožai (CRO), Anastasios Piloidis (GRE), Semen Ovinov (RUS)

20 January 2016	ratiopharm Ulm (Germany)	80–92	(Turkey) Banvit	Ulm, Germany
19:30 (CET)	Scoring by quarter: 15–19, 23–17, 20–24, 22–32
	Pts: Morgan 16; Rebs: Braun 10; Asts: Braun 6 PIR: Morgan, Babb 14	Boxscore	Pts: Johnson 23; Rebs: Moerman 7 Asts: Fortson 11; PIR: Fortson 30	Arena: ratiopharm Arena; Referees: Tomas Jasevičius (LTU), Aare Halliko (EST), Jasmina Juras (SRB)

20 January 2016	Dominion Bilbao Basket (Spain)	76–78	(Germany) Bayern Munich	Bilbao, Spain
20:45 (CET)	Scoring by quarter: 25–18, 15–23, 23–20, 13–17
	Pts: Bertāns 27; Rebs: Mumbrú, Ruoff 6 Asts: Hannah, López 5 PIR: Bertāns 28	Boxscore	Pts: Renfroe 16; Rebs: Renfroe, Taylor 8 Asts: Gavel 3 PIR: Renfroe 18	Arena: Bilbao Arena; Referees: Joseph Bissang (FRA), Siniša Herceg (CRO), Amit Balak (ISR)

27 January 2016	Banvit (Turkey)	92–72	(Germany) ratiopharm Ulm	Bandırma, Turkey
18:00 (CET)	Scoring by quarter: 29–15, 24–21, 26–17, 13–19
	Pts: Johnson 20; Rebs: Moerman 14; Asts: Fortson 11; PIR: Moerman 38	Boxscore	Pts: Rubit 15; Rebs: Rubit 8 Asts: Braun, Brown 4 PIR: Rubit 20	Arena: Banvit Kara Ali Acar Sport Hall; Referees: Petar Obradović (BIH), Benjamín Jiménez (ESP), Gentian Cici (ALB)

27 January 2016	Bayern Munich (Germany)	88–90	(Spain) Dominion Bilbao Basket	Munich, Germany
20:00 (CET)	Scoring by quarter: 21–17, 20–23, 15–24, 32–26
	Pts: Renfroe 23; Rebs: Zipser 6 Asts: Cobbs, Gavel 4 PIR: Zipser 28	Boxscore	Pts: Bertāns 24; Rebs: Bogris 10; Asts: Mumbrú 4 PIR: Bertāns 30	Arena: Audi Dome; Referees: Elias Koromilas (GRE), Seffi Shemmesh (ISR), Erşan Kartal (TUR)

3 February 2016	Bayern Munich (Germany)	77–62	(Turkey) Banvit	Munich, Germany
20:00 (CET)	Scoring by quarter: 14–20, 27–15, 18–16, 18–11
	Pts: Đedović 28; Rebs: Renfroe 8 Asts: Renfroe 13; PIR: Đedović, Renfroe 31	Boxscore	Pts: Moerman 20; Rebs: Johnson 8 Asts: Johnson, Slaughter 3 PIR: Johnson 25	Arena: Audi Dome; Referees: Miguel Ángel Pérez Niz (ESP), Marek Ćmikiewicz (POL), Torkild Rødsand (NOR)

3 February 2016	Dominion Bilbao Basket (Spain)	83–65	(Germany) ratiopharm Ulm	Bilbao, Spain
20:30 (CET)	Scoring by quarter: 16–11, 27–18, 15–20, 25–16
	Pts: Bertāns 18; Rebs: Bogris 12; Asts: Hannah 6 PIR: Bertāns, Bogris 21	Boxscore	Pts: Henry 10; Rebs: Neumann 8 Asts: three players 2 PIR: Neumann	Arena: Bilbao Arena; Referees: Tolga Sahin (ITA), Haris Bijedić (BIH), Markos Michaelides (SUI)

10 February 2016	Banvit (Turkey)	73–65	(Spain) Dominion Bilbao Basket	Bandırma, Turkey
18:00 (CET)	Scoring by quarter: 19–14, 15–13, 16–25, 23–13
	Pts: Fortson 24; Rebs: Moerman 15; Asts: Fortson 3 PIR: Fortson 23	Boxscore	Pts: Hannah 14; Rebs: Bogris 10; Asts: Bogris, Hannah 4 PIR: Bogris 20	Arena: Banvit Kara Ali Acar Sport Hall; Referees: Robert Vyklický (CZE), Sergey Zashchuk (UKR), Sérgio Silva (POR)

10 February 2016	ratiopharm Ulm (Germany)	74–65	(Germany) Bayern Munich	Ulm, Germany
19:30 (CET)	Scoring by quarter: 24–7, 20–19, 15–20, 15–19
	Pts: Butler 15; Rebs: Morgan 6 Asts: Henry 8 PIR: Butler 19	Boxscore	Pts: Gavel 17; Rebs: Zipser 8 Asts: Cobbs 6 PIR: Gavel 14	Arena: ratiopharm Arena; Referees: Petros Papapetrou (GRE), Nicola Maestre (FRA), Ingus Baumanis (LAT)

=== Group H ===
Pos	Team	Pld	W	L	PF	PA	PD	Qualification
1	(Spain) Herbalife Gran Canaria	6	5	1	531	440	+91	Advance to Eighthfinals
2	(France) SIG Strasbourg	6	4	2	464	456	+8	Advance to Eighthfinals
3	(Russia) Avtodor Saratov	6	3	3	531	540	−9	
4	(Israel) Hapoel Jerusalem	6	0	6	455	545	−90	

Source: Eurocup Basketball

6 January 2016	Avtodor Saratov (Russia)	105–96	(Israel) Hapoel Jerusalem	Saratov, Russia
15:00 (CET)	Scoring by quarter: 30–30, 27–21, 29–33, 19–12
	Pts: Peterson 29; Rebs: Peterson 14; Asts: Stoll 8 PIR: Peterson 39	Boxscore	Pts: Smith 29; Rebs: Smith 7 Asts: Eliyahu 5 PIR: Smith 32	Arena: Kristall Arena; Referees: Boris Shulga (UKR), Marcin Kowalski (POL), Mario Majkić (SLO)

6 January 2016	Herbalife Gran Canaria (Spain)	76–85	(France) SIG Strasbourg	Las Palmas, Spain
19:30 (CET)	Scoring by quarter: 21–26, 17–17, 15–25, 23–17
	Pts: Seeley 22; Rebs: Aguilar 10; Asts: Pangos 6 PIR: Seeley 17	Boxscore	Pts: Collins 21; Rebs: Collins 7 Asts: Collins 4 PIR: Collins 28	Arena: Gran Canaria Arena; Referees: Seffi Shemmesh (ISR), Uroš Obrknežević (SRB), Torkild Rødsand (NOR)

13 January 2016	Hapoel Jerusalem (Israel)	64–75	(Spain) Herbalife Gran Canaria	Jerusalem, Israel
19:55 (CET)	Scoring by quarter: 16–18, 13–28, 13–15, 22–14
	Pts: Halperin, Gaffney 14; Rebs: Eliyahu 9 Asts: Rowland 7 PIR: Halperin 21	Boxscore	Pts: Salin 20; Rebs: Aguilar, Omić 6 Asts: Oliver 5 PIR: Salin 21	Arena: Pais Arena; Referees: Saša Pukl (SLO), Milija Vojinović (SRB), Igor Mitrovski (MKD)

13 January 2016	SIG Strasbourg (France)	77–74	(Russia) Avtodor Saratov	Strasbourg, France
20:45 (CET)	Scoring by quarter: 16–14, 24–17, 18–13, 19–30
	Pts: Collins 19; Rebs: Howard 9 Asts: Campbell, Collins 5 PIR: Collins 27	Boxscore	Pts: Peterson 21; Rebs: Peterson 12; Asts: Chappell 6 PIR: Peterson 27	Arena: Rhénus Sport; Referees: Arnis Ozols (LAT), Saverio Lanzarini (ITA), David Romano (ISR)

20 January 2016	SIG Strasbourg (France)	75–71	(Israel) Hapoel Jerusalem	Strasbourg, France
20:45 (CET)	Scoring by quarter: 13–14, 18–23, 24–14, 20–20
	Pts: Collins 14; Rebs: Howard 9 Asts: Campbell 7 PIR: Collins 16	Boxscore	Pts: Rowland 20; Rebs: Gaffney 6 Asts: Smith 4 PIR: Rowland 18	Arena: Rhénus Sport; Referees: Alessandro Martolini (ITA), Jurgis Laurinavičius (LTU), Haris Bijedić (BIH)

20 January 2016	Herbalife Gran Canaria (Spain)	101–77	(Russia) Avtodor Saratov	Las Palmas, Spain
21:00 (CET)	Scoring by quarter: 23–24, 27–20, 23–18, 28–15
	Pts: Omić 18; Rebs: Omić 9 Asts: Oliver 11; PIR: Omić 22	Boxscore	Pts: Chappell 14; Rebs: Brooks 9 Asts: Chappell 4 PIR: Brooks 21	Arena: Gran Canaria Arena; Referees: Christos Christodoulou (GRE), Sašo Petek (SLO), Tomislav Hordov (CRO)

27 January 2016	Avtodor Saratov (Russia)	85–92	(Spain) Herbalife Gran Canaria	Saratov, Russia
17:00 (CET)	Scoring by quarter: 12–26, 25–18, 28–20, 22–28
	Pts: Peterson 19; Rebs: Brooks 7 Asts: Stoll 5 PIR: Brooks, Peterson 21	Boxscore	Pts: Salin 19; Rebs: Omić 7 Asts: Oliver 10; PIR: Salin 19	Arena: Kristall Arena; Referees: Anastasios Piloïdis (GRE), Aleksandar Glišić (SRB), Moritz Reiter (GER)

27 January 2016	Hapoel Jerusalem (Israel)	69–79	(France) SIG Strasbourg	Jerusalem, Israel
20:05 (CET)	Scoring by quarter: 13–25, 21–15, 14–18, 21–21
	Pts: Duncan 16; Rebs: Smith 6 Asts: Gaffney, Smith 4 PIR: Smith 14	Boxscore	Pts: Weems 15; Rebs: Howard, Weems 7 Asts: Campbell 4 PIR: Campbell 16	Arena: Pais Arena; Referees: Spiros Gkontas (GRE), Piotr Pastusiak (POL), Semen Ovinov (RUS)

3 February 2016	Hapoel Jerusalem (Israel)	94–103	(Russia) Avtodor Saratov	Jerusalem, Israel
18:30 (CET)	Scoring by quarter: 25–38, 23–22, 20–22, 26–21
	Pts: Menco 18; Rebs: Duncan, Smith 7 Asts: Smith 6 PIR: Menco 21	Boxscore	Pts: Peterson 29; Rebs: Klimenko, Makiev 8 Asts: Stoll 13; PIR: Peterson 33	Arena: Pais Arena; Referees: Tomas Jasevičius (LTU), Carlos Peruga (ESP), Jasmina Juras (SRB)

3 February 2016	SIG Strasbourg (France)	68–79	(Spain) Herbalife Gran Canaria	Strasbourg, France
20:45 (CET)	Scoring by quarter: 21–25, 15–15, 15–17, 17–22
	Pts: Leloup 20; Rebs: Howard 10; Asts: Collins 4 PIR: Leloup 26	Boxscore	Pts: Seeley 16; Rebs: Aguilar 6 Asts: Oliver 8 PIR: Seeley 20	Arena: Rhénus Sport; Referees: Robert Lottermoser (GER), Sérgio Silva (POR), Amit Balak (ISR)

10 February 2016	Avtodor Saratov (Russia)	87–80	(France) SIG Strasbourg	Saratov, Russia
17:00 (CET)	Scoring by quarter: 24–20, 12–15, 30–22, 21–23
	Pts: Chappell 29; Rebs: Williams 8 Asts: Stoll 6 PIR: Chappell 31	Boxscore	Pts: Beaubois 23; Rebs: Howard 6 Asts: Collins 7 PIR: Beaubois 20	Arena: Kristall Arena; Referees: Marcin Kowalski (POL), Miloš Koljenšić (MNE), Torkild Rødsand (NOR)

10 February 2016	Herbalife Gran Canaria (Spain)	108–61	(Israel) Hapoel Jerusalem	Las Palmas, Spain
21:00 (CET)	Scoring by quarter: 31–12, 27–13, 25–21, 25–15
	Pts: Aguilar 19; Rebs: Omić 17; Asts: Oliver 8 PIR: Omić 37	Boxscore	Pts: Duncan 14; Rebs: Duncan 5 Asts: Rowland 5 PIR: Smith 13	Arena: Gran Canaria Arena; Referees: Borys Ryzhyk (UKR), Siniša Herceg (CRO), Mario Majkić (SLO)

=== Group I ===
Pos	Team	Pld	W	L	PF	PA	PD	Qualification
1	(Germany) EWE Baskets Oldenburg	6	4	2	494	490	+4	Advance to Eighthfinals
2	(France) Limoges CSP	6	3	3	494	467	+27	Advance to Eighthfinals
3	(Spain) Valencia Basket	6	3	3	474	462	+12	
4	(Greece) PAOK	6	2	4	425	468	−43	

Source: Eurocup Basketball

5 January 2016	Limoges CSP (France)	78–87	(Germany) EWE Baskets Oldenburg	Limoges, France
20:30 (CET)	Scoring by quarter: 20–20, 30–18, 12–27, 16–22
	Pts: Gatens 17; Rebs: Boungou Colo, Camara 7 Asts: Boungou Colo 5 PIR: Boungou Colo 16	Boxscore	Pts: Qvale 18; Rebs: Aleksandrov 13; Asts: Kramer 8 PIR: Qvale 25	Arena: Beaublanc; Referees: Marko Juras (SRB), Jurgis Laurinavičiu (LTU), Gentian Cici (ALB)

6 January 2016	Valencia Basket (Spain)	78–62	(Greece) PAOK	Valencia, Spain
19:00 (CET)	Scoring by quarter: 21–18, 13–11, 24–18, 20–15
	Pts: Dubljević 12; Rebs: Sikma 10; Asts: Vives 5 PIR: Sikma 18	Boxscore	Pts: Duvnjak 14; Rebs: three players 4 Asts: Schortsanitis 4 PIR: Duvnjak 14	Arena: Pabellón Fuente de San Luis; Referees: Milija Vojinović (SRB), Tomasz Trawicki (POL), Nick Van den Broeck (BEL)

12 January 2016	PAOK (Greece)	88–75	(France) Limoges CSP	Thessaloniki, Greece
18:00 (CET)	Scoring by quarter: 24–19, 23–17, 26–23, 15–16
	Pts: Schortsanitis 19; Rebs: Marković, Vasileiadis 8 Asts: Hatcher, Marković 4 PIR: Marković 29	Boxscore	Pts: Traoré 18; Rebs: Camara, McCalebb 4 Asts: Westermann 5 PIR: McCalebb 18	Arena: PAOK Sports Arena; Referees: Seffi Shemmesh (ISR), Carlos Cortés (ESP), Mario Majkić (SLO)

13 January 2016	EWE Baskets Oldenburg (Germany)	89–108	(Spain) Valencia Basket	Oldenburg, Germany
20:00 (CET)	Scoring by quarter: 26–26, 20–28, 21–31, 22–23
	Pts: Qvale 16; Rebs: three players 5 Asts: Kramer 6 PIR: Prepelič 17	Boxscore	Pts: Diot 25; Rebs: three players 5 Asts: Diot 8 PIR: Diot 32	Arena: Kleine EWE Arena; Referees: Marek Ćmikiewicz (POL), Igor Dragojević (MNE), Alexey Davydov (RUS)

19 January 2016	PAOK (Greece)	68–81	(Germany) EWE Baskets Oldenburg	Thessaloniki, Greece
18:00 (CET)	Scoring by quarter: 15–16, 13–27, 17–22, 23–16
	Pts: Hatcher 17; Rebs: Marković 13; Asts: Tsochlas 5 PIR: three players 14	Boxscore	Pts: Qvale 15; Rebs: Qvale 6 Asts: Duggins 7 PIR: Kramer 23	Arena: PAOK Sports Arena; Referees: Marcin Kowalski (POL), Carlos Peruga (ESP), Miloš Koljenšić (MNE)

19 January 2016	Valencia Basket (Spain)	72–92	(France) Limoges CSP	Valencia, Spain
20:45 (CET)	Scoring by quarter: 15–21, 29–23, 14–21, 14–27
	Pts: Dubljević 16; Rebs: Hamilton 8 Asts: Shurna 4 PIR: Dubljević 17	Boxscore	Pts: Boungou Colo 23; Rebs: Payne 5 Asts: McCalebb 6 PIR: Boungou Colo 22	Arena: Pabellón Fuente de San Luis; Referees: Tolga Sahin (ITA), Aleksandar Glišić (SRB), Murat Biricik (TUR)

26 January 2016	EWE Baskets Oldenburg (Germany)	83–71	(Greece) PAOK	Oldenburg, Germany
20:00 (CET)	Scoring by quarter: 24–24, 24–15, 26–10, 9–22
	Pts: Kramer 23; Rebs: Aleksandrov 5 Asts: Duggins, Kramer 5 PIR: Kramer 28	Boxscore	Pts: Duvnjak, Marković 11; Rebs: Marković 8 Asts: Marković 4 PIR: Marković 25	Arena: Kleine EWE Arena; Referees: Sreten Radović (CRO), Robert Vyklický (CZE), Amit Balak (ISR)

26 January 2016	Limoges CSP (France)	82–67	(Spain) Valencia Basket	Limoges, France
20:40 (CET)	Scoring by quarter: 18–23, 21–9, 23–18, 20–17
	Pts: McCalebb 15; Rebs: Daniels 7 Asts: Westermann 7 PIR: Boungou Colo 18	Boxscore	Pts: Martínez 17; Rebs: Shurna, Sikma 7 Asts: San Emeterio 4 PIR: Martínez 22	Arena: Beaublanc; Referees: Petri Mäntylä (FIN), Renaud Geller (BEL), Ilya Putenko (RUS)

3 February 2016	PAOK (Greece)	75–72	(Spain) Valencia Basket	Thessaloniki, Greece
18:00 (CET)	Scoring by quarter: 19–19, 20–14, 19–22, 17–17
	Pts: Hatcher 18; Rebs: Marković, Tepić 7 Asts: Hatcher 4 PIR: Hatcher 19	Boxscore	Pts: Vives 19; Rebs: Sikma 8 Asts: Sikma 5 PIR: Vives 24	Arena: PAOK Sports Arena; Referees: Milija Vojinović (SRB), Tomislav Hordov (CRO), Igor Mitrovski (MKD)

3 February 2016	EWE Baskets Oldenburg (Germany)	92–88	(France) Limoges CSP	Oldenburg, Germany
20:00 (CET)	Scoring by quarter: 17–16, 24–25, 26–21, 25–26
	Pts: Duggins 21; Rebs: Smeulders 8 Asts: Kramer 5 PIR: Duggins 25	Boxscore	Pts: Daniels 15; Rebs: Daniels, Traoré 5 Asts: Westermann 6 PIR: Daniels 20	Arena: Große EWE Arena; Referees: Óscar Perea (ESP), Tomasz Trawicki (POL), Josip Radojković (CRO)

10 February 2016	Limoges CSP (France)	79–61	(Greece) PAOK	Limoges, France
20:40 (CET)	Scoring by quarter: 16–9, 23–16, 17–17, 23–19
	Pts: McCalebb 17; Rebs: Daniels 7 Asts: Schaffartzik 5 PIR: McCalebb 24	Boxscore	Pts: Dedas 19; Rebs: Tepić 4 Asts: Tsochlas 3 PIR: Dedas 18	Arena: Beaublanc; Referees: Arnis Ozols (LAT), Jurgis Laurinavičius (LTU), Haris Bijedić (BIH)

10 February 2016	Valencia Basket (Spain)	77–62	(Germany) EWE Baskets Oldenburg	Valencia, Spain
20:40 (CET)	Scoring by quarter: 23–20, 17–15, 26–14, 11–13
	Pts: Hamilton 16; Rebs: Shurna 8 Asts: Vives 5 PIR: Shurna 25	Boxscore	Pts: Paulding 20; Rebs: Qvale 7 Asts: Prepelič 4 PIR: Paulding 21	Arena: Pabellón Fuente de San Luis; Referees: Anastasios Piloidis (GRE), Marko Juras (SRB), Erşan Kartal (TUR)

=== Group J ===
Pos	Team	Pld	W	L	PF	PA	PD	Qualification
1	(Italy) EA7 Emporio Armani Milan	6	4	2	474	442	+32	Advance to Eighthfinals
2	(Germany) Alba Berlin	6	3	3	447	433	+14	Advance to Eighthfinals
3	(Greece) Aris	6	3	3	429	438	−9	
4	(Lithuania) Neptūnas	6	2	4	409	446	−37	

Source: Eurocup Basketball

6 January 2016	Aris (Greece)	84–58	(Lithuania) Neptūnas	Thessaloniki, Greece
18:00 (CET)	Scoring by quarter: 25–5, 21–17, 17–22, 21–14
	Pts: McNeal 18; Rebs: Hagins 7 Asts: Xanthopoulos 6 PIR: White 25	Boxscore	Pts: Ewing 13; Rebs: Grant 5 Asts: Mažeika 5 PIR: Biruta 16	Arena: Palais des Sports; Referees: Joseph Bissang (FRA), Petar Obradović (BIH), Amit Balak (ISR)

6 January 2016	Alba Berlin (Germany)	83–67	(Italy) EA7 Emporio Armani Milan	Berlin, Germany
20:00 (CET)	Scoring by quarter: 25–21, 16–19, 19–12, 23–15
	Pts: Milosavljević 23; Rebs: Kikanović 8 Asts: Cherry 8 PIR: Milosavljević 28	Boxscore	Pts: McLean 18; Rebs: McLean, Simon 6 Asts: Lafayette 4 PIR: McLean 19	Arena: Mercedes-Benz Arena; Referees: Fernando Rocha (POR), Elias Koromilas (GRE), Carlos Peruga (ESP)

12 January 2016	EA7 Emporio Armani Milan (Italy)	95–54	(Greece) Aris	Milan, Italy
20:00 (CET)	Scoring by quarter: 24–17, 33–10, 14–15, 24–12
	Pts: Mačvan 16; Rebs: Barać 9 Asts: Lafayette 5 PIR: Mačvan 23	Boxscore	Pts: Waters 12; Rebs: White 7 Asts: Waters 3 PIR: Waters 10	Arena: Mediolanum Forum; Referees: Matej Boltauzer (SLO), Tomasz Trawicki (POL), Nick Van den Broeck (BEL)

13 January 2016	Neptūnas (Lithuania)	73–65	(Germany) Alba Berlin	Klaipėda, Lithuania
18:00 (CET)	Scoring by quarter: 20–9, 18–20, 12–23, 23–13
	Pts: Girdžiūnas 14; Rebs: Grant 8 Asts: Mažeika 4 PIR: Grant 20	Boxscore	Pts: Cherry 17; Rebs: Kikanović, Milosavljević 6 Asts: Cherry 3 PIR: Milosavljević 14	Arena: Švyturio Arena; Referees: Robert Vyklický (CZE), Sergey Zashchuk (UKR), Gentian Cici (ALB)

19 January 2016	Alba Berlin (Germany)	82–67	(Greece) Aris	Berlin, Germany
19:00 (CET)	Scoring by quarter: 21–20, 17–17, 20–21, 24–9
	Pts: Kikanović 22; Rebs: Kikanović 10; Asts: King 3 PIR: Kikanović 32	Boxscore	Pts: McNeal, Waters 20; Rebs: Hagins, Symtsak 5 Asts: Xanthopoulos 3 PIR: Waters 17	Arena: Mercedes-Benz Arena; Referees: Daniel Hierrezuelo (ESP), David Romano (ISR), Torkild Rødsand (NOR)

19 January 2016	EA7 Emporio Armani Milan (Italy)	79–71	(Lithuania) Neptūnas	Milan, Italy
20:00 (CET)	Scoring by quarter: 24–20, 17–12, 12–22, 26–17
	Pts: McLean, Simon 15; Rebs: McLean 9 Asts: Simon 5 PIR: McLean 22	Boxscore	Pts: Grant 15; Rebs: Grant 12; Asts: Ewing 4 PIR: Grant 29	Arena: Mediolanum Forum; Referees: Miguel Ángel Pérez Niz (ESP), Erşan Kartal (TUR), Clemens Fritz (GER)

26 January 2016	Neptūnas (Lithuania)	73–74	(Italy) EA7 Emporio Armani Milan	Klaipėda, Lithuania
18:45 (CET)	Scoring by quarter: 15–16, 11–20, 26–28, 21–10
	Pts: Zavackas 17; Rebs: Grant 8 Asts: Ewing 7 PIR: Zavackas 24	Boxscore	Pts: Simon 15; Rebs: Mačvan 7 Asts: Simon 6 PIR: Simon 25	Arena: Švyturio Arena; Referees: Milivoje Jovčić (SRB), Alexey Davydov (RUS), Mario Majkić (SLO)

27 January 2016	Aris (Greece)	73–63	(Germany) Alba Berlin	Thessaloniki, Greece
18:00 (CET)	Scoring by quarter: 15–19, 27–15, 13–20, 18–9
	Pts: McNeal 25; Rebs: Cohen, McNeal 5 Asts: Waters 7 PIR: McNeal 28	Boxscore	Pts: Kikanović 15; Rebs: Cherry 7 Asts: Cherry, Milosavljević 3 PIR: Cherry 16	Arena: Palais des Sports; Referees: Marek Ćmikiewicz (POL), Sérgio Silva (POR), Haris Bijedić (BIH)

3 February 2016	Neptūnas (Lithuania)	72–68	(Greece) Aris	Klaipėda, Lithuania
18:00 (CET)	Scoring by quarter: 21–16, 22–25, 7–9, 22–18
	Pts: Ewing 18; Rebs: four players 5 Asts: Ewing 4 PIR: Ewing 21	Boxscore	Pts: Waters 16; Rebs: Hagins 8 Asts: McNeal, Xanthopoulos 3 PIR: Hagins 18	Arena: Švyturio Arena; Referees: Arnis Ozols (LAT), Alessandro Martolini (ITA), Moritz Reiter (GER)

3 February 2016	EA7 Emporio Armani Milan (Italy)	91–78	(Germany) Alba Berlin	Milan, Italy
20:00 (CET)	Scoring by quarter: 24–29, 23–16, 22–12, 22–21
	Pts: Simon 28; Rebs: Simon 6 Asts: Cerella, Lafayette 4 PIR: Simon 32	Boxscore	Pts: Lončar 20; Rebs: Lowery 7 Asts: Cherry 7 PIR: Cherry 24	Arena: Mediolanum Forum; Referees: Juan Carlos García González (ESP), Ingus Baumanis (LAT), Jean-Charles Collin (FRA)

9 February 2016	Alba Berlin (Germany)	76–62	(Lithuania) Neptūnas	Berlin, Germany
20:00 (CET)	Scoring by quarter: 22–14, 19–7, 19–23, 16–18
	Pts: Lowery 24; Rebs: King 12; Asts: Cherry 5 PIR: Lowery 22	Boxscore	Pts: Ewing 17; Rebs: Grant 8 Asts: Ewing 5 PIR: Grant 24	Arena: Mercedes-Benz Arena; Referees: Saša Pukl (SLO), Carlos Cortés (ESP), Ilya Putenko (RUS)

10 February 2016	Aris (Greece)	83–68	(Italy) EA7 Emporio Armani Milan	Thessaloniki, Greece
18:00 (CET)	Scoring by quarter: 26–21, 20–26, 22–12, 15–9
	Pts: Hagins 15; Rebs: Hagins 8 Asts: Waters 5 PIR: Hagins 18	Boxscore	Pts: Sanders 14; Rebs: Barać 6 Asts: Cinciarini, McLean 3 PIR: Mačvan 16	Arena: Palais des Sports; Referees: Oļegs Latiševs (LAT), Óscar Perea (ESP), Radomir Vojinović (MNE)

=== Group K ===
Pos	Team	Pld	W	L	PF	PA	PD	Qualification
1	(Italy) Dolomiti Energia Trento	6	4	2	470	467	+3	Advance to Eighthfinals
2	(Turkey) Pınar Karşıyaka	6	3	3	498	426	+72	Advance to Eighthfinals
3	(Turkey) Trabzonspor Medical Park	6	3	3	450	465	−15	
4	(Italy) Grissin Bon Reggio Emilia	6	2	4	454	514	−60	

Source: Eurocup Basketball

6 January 2016	Pınar Karşıyaka (Turkey)	81–68	(Turkey) Trabzonspor Medical Park	İzmir, Turkey
19:00 (CET)	Scoring by quarter: 26–17, 21–16, 10–12, 24–23
	Pts: Wright 23; Rebs: Iverson 9 Asts: Şentürk, Sipahi 5 PIR: Wright 31	Boxscore	Pts: Hardy, Kulig 17; Rebs: Stipanović 9 Asts: Kitchen 6 PIR: Kulig 18	Arena: Karşıyaka Arena; Referees: Marek Ćmikiewicz (POL), Haris Bijedić (BIH), Semen Ovinov (RUS)

6 January 2016	Dolomiti Energia Trento (Italy)	82–63	(Italy) Grissin Bon Reggio Emilia	Trento, Italy
19:30 (CET)	Scoring by quarter: 22–9, 15–19, 25–17, 20–18
	Pts: Sanders 16; Rebs: Lockett 6 Asts: five players 2 PIR: Sanders 21	Boxscore	Pts: Aradori 13; Rebs: Golubović 8 Asts: De Nicolao 5 PIR: Veremeenko 10	Arena: PalaTrento; Referees: Emilio Pérez Pizarro (ESP), Erşan Kartal (TUR), Jean-Charles Collin (FRA)

13 January 2016	Trabzonspor Medical Park (Turkey)	92–70	(Italy) Dolomiti Energia Trento	Trabzon, Turkey
18:00 (CET)	Scoring by quarter: 22–17, 23–14, 20–17, 27–22
	Pts: Hardy 23; Rebs: Thompson 9 Asts: Hardy, Kitchen 9 PIR: Kulig 22	Boxscore	Pts: Pascolo 17; Rebs: Baldi Rossi 6 Asts: Sanders 5 PIR: Pascolo 21	Arena: Hayri Gür Arena; Referees: Siniša Herceg (CRO), Radomir Vojinović (MNE), Moritz Reiter (GER)

13 January 2016	Grissin Bon Reggio Emilia (Italy)	88–81	(Turkey) Pınar Karşıyaka	Reggio Emilia, Italy
20:30 (CET)	Scoring by quarter: 18–25, 28–17, 30–21, 12–18
	Pts: Aradori 22; Rebs: Aradori 7 Asts: De Nicolao 5 PIR: Aradori 22	Boxscore	Pts: Gabriel 18; Rebs: Wright 5 Asts: Sipahi 5 PIR: Wright 22	Arena: PalaBigi; Referees: Miguel Ángel Pérez Niz (ESP), Tomas Jasevičius (LTU), Ingus Baumanis (LAT)

20 January 2016	Pınar Karşıyaka (Turkey)	79–85	(Italy) Dolomiti Energia Trento	İzmir, Turkey
18:00 (CET)	Scoring by quarter: 18–16, 20–20, 20–24, 21–25
	Pts: Wright 26; Rebs: Sipahi 5 Asts: Wright 7 PIR: Wright 27	Boxscore	Pts: Wright 26; Rebs: Pascolo 8 Asts: Wright 7 PIR: Pascolo 20	Arena: Karşıyaka Arena; Referees: Antonio Conde (ESP), Igor Dragojević (MNE), Gentian Cici (ALB)

20 January 2016	Trabzonspor Medical Park (Turkey)	82–76	(Italy) Grissin Bon Reggio Emilia	Trabzon, Turkey
18:00 (CET)	Scoring by quarter: 17–31, 22–17, 22–10, 21–18
	Pts: Hardy 20; Rebs: Stipanović 6 Asts: Stipanović 4 PIR: Hardy 16	Boxscore	Pts: Della Valle 18; Rebs: Aradori 6 Asts: De Nicolao 4 PIR: Della Valle 22	Arena: Hayri Gür Arena; Referees: Carlos Cortés (ESP), Marko Juras (SRB), Nick Van den Broeck (BEL)

27 January 2016	Grissin Bon Reggio Emilia (Italy)	89–76	(Turkey) Trabzonspor Medical Park	Reggio Emilia, Italy
20:30 (CET)	Scoring by quarter: 26–17, 23–18, 21–21, 19–20
	Pts: Della Valle 18; Rebs: Veremeenko 10; Asts: Aradori 6 PIR: Veremeenko 20	Boxscore	Pts: Hardy 20; Rebs: Kitchen 9 Asts: Kitchen 5 PIR: Kitchen 22	Arena: PalaBigi; Referees: Ioannis Foufis (GRE), Igor Dragojević (MNE), Jasmina Juras (SRB)

27 January 2016	Dolomiti Energia Trento (Italy)	76–72	(Turkey) Pınar Karşıyaka	Trento, Italy
20:30 (CET)	Scoring by quarter: 26–18, 18–14, 18–19, 14–21
	Pts: Baldi Rossi, Pascolo 17; Rebs: Wright 8 Asts: Forray 5 PIR: Forray 26	Boxscore	Pts: Wright 23; Rebs: Iverson 10; Asts: Şentürk 3 PIR: Wright 25	Arena: PalaTrento; Referees: Carlos Cortés (ESP), Clemens Fritz (GER), Uroš Obrknežević (SRB)

2 February 2016	Trabzonspor Medical Park (Turkey)	43–76	(Turkey) Pınar Karşıyaka	Trabzon, Turkey
18:00 (CET)	Scoring by quarter: 16–17, 5–19, 9–19, 13–21
	Pts: Kulig, Stipanović 10; Rebs: Kitchen 12; Asts: Stipanović, Yıldırım 2 PIR: Stipanović 11	Boxscore	Pts: Iverson 14; Rebs: Iverson 8 Asts: Jones 4 PIR: Iverson 20	Arena: Hayri Gür Arena; Referees: Ilija Belošević (SRB), Robert Vyklický (CZE), Mario Majkić (SLO)

3 February 2016	Grissin Bon Reggio Emilia (Italy)	72–84	(Italy) Dolomiti Energia Trento	Reggio Emilia, Italy
20:30 (CET)	Scoring by quarter: 18–20, 21–26, 13–24, 20–14
	Pts: Polonara 18; Rebs: Polonara 7 Asts: Della Valle, Gentile 3 PIR: Polonara 17	Boxscore	Pts: Pascolo 25; Rebs: Pascolo, Sanders 6 Asts: Wright 6 PIR: Pascolo 31	Arena: PalaBigi; Referees: Srđan Dožai (CRO), Aleksandar Glišić (SRB), Erşan Kartal (TUR)

10 February 2016	Pınar Karşıyaka (Turkey)	109–66	(Italy) Grissin Bon Reggio Emilia	İzmir, Turkey
19:00 (CET)	Scoring by quarter: 24–18, 28–17, 29–14, 28–17
	Pts: Gabriel 25; Rebs: Gabriel 6 Asts: Jones 8 PIR: Gabriel 27	Boxscore	Pts: Polonara 24; Rebs: Polonara 10; Asts: De Nicolao, Della Valle 6 PIR: Polonara 31	Arena: Karşıyaka Arena; Referees: Emilio Pérez Pizarro (ESP), Seffi Shemmesh (ISR), Moritz Reiter (GER)

10 February 2016	Dolomiti Energia Trento (Italy)	73–89	(Turkey) Trabzonspor Medical Park	Trento, Italy
20:30 (CET)	Scoring by quarter: 18–14, 19–22, 14–31, 22–22
	Pts: three players 10; Rebs: Pascolo, Sutton 6 Asts: Pascolo 5 PIR: Pascolo, Wright 12	Boxscore	Pts: Hardy 27; Rebs: Veličković 6 Asts: Hardy 5 PIR: Hardy 28	Arena: PalaTrento; Referees: Vicente Bultó (ESP), Marek Ćmikiewicz (POL), Markos Michaelides (SUI)

=== Group L ===
Pos	Team	Pld	W	L	PF	PA	PD	Qualification
1	(Russia) Zenit Saint Petersburg	6	4	2	479	470	+9	Advance to Eighthfinals
2	(Poland) Stelmet Zielona Góra	6	3	3	458	463	−5	Advance to Eighthfinals
3	(Germany) MHP Riesen Ludwigsburg	6	3	3	477	468	+9	
4	(Italy) Umana Reyer Venezia	6	2	4	461	474	−13	

Source: Eurocup Basketball

5 January 2016	MHP Riesen Ludwigsburg (Germany)	73–82	(Poland) Stelmet Zielona Góra	Ludwigsburg, Germany
20:00 (CET)	Scoring by quarter: 25–16, 16–22, 16–23, 16–21
	Pts: Brockman 12; Rebs: O'Neale 7 Asts: Johnson 5 PIR: Brockman 15	Boxscore	Pts: Ponitka 14; Rebs: Djurisic 8 Asts: Koszarek 7 PIR: Djurisic 21	Arena: MHP Arena; Referees: Aare Halliko (EST), Tomislav Hordov (CRO), Ingus Baumanis (LAT)

6 January 2016	Umana Reyer Venezia (Italy)	84–86	(Russia) Zenit Saint Petersburg	Venice, Italy
20:30 (CET)	Scoring by quarter: 17–19, 21–22, 20–18, 26–27
	Pts: Green 29; Rebs: Owens 8 Asts: Goss 5 PIR: Green 38	Boxscore	Pts: Toolson 21; Rebs: Dowdell 7 Asts: Dowdell 7 PIR: Toolson 26	Arena: Palasport Taliercio; Referees: Carlos Cortés (ESP), Robert Vyklický (CZE), Markos Michaelides (SUI)

13 January 2016	Zenit Saint Petersburg (Russia)	83–80	(Germany) MHP Riesen Ludwigsburg	Saint Petersburg, Russia
18:00 (CET)	Scoring by quarter: 24–22, 22–19, 13–14, 24–25
	Pts: Dowdell 19; Rebs: Toolson, Vikhrov 7 Asts: Dowdell 6 PIR: Dowdell 25	Boxscore	Pts: Shakur 19; Rebs: Shakur 10; Asts: Johnson 4 PIR: Shakur 29	Arena: Sibur Arena; Referees: Jurgis Laurinavičius (LTU), Alessandro Martolini (ITA), Jasmina Juras (SRB)

13 January 2016	Stelmet Zielona Góra (Poland)	83–92	(Italy) Umana Reyer Venezia	Zielona Góra, Poland
19:00 (CET)	Scoring by quarter: 21–22, 25–17, 15–31, 22–22
	Pts: Moldoveanu 15; Rebs: Ponitka 10; Asts: Ponitka 8 PIR: Ponitka 23	Boxscore	Pts: Green 24; Rebs: Owens 8 Asts: Green 11; PIR: Green 42	Arena: Centrum Rekreacyjno Sportowe; Referees: Benjamín Jiménez (ESP), Renaud Geller (BEL), Josip Radojković (CRO)

20 January 2016	Stelmet Zielona Góra (Poland)	76–90	(Russia) Zenit Saint Petersburg	Zielona Góra, Poland
19:00 (CET)	Scoring by quarter: 13–22, 11–21, 26–29, 26–18
	Pts: Borovnjak 17; Rebs: Moldoveanu 5 Asts: Bost 6 PIR: Ponitka 16	Boxscore	Pts: Toolson 20; Rebs: three players 6 Asts: Dowdell 7 PIR: Timma 21	Arena: Centrum Rekreacyjno Sportowe; Referees: Vicente Bultó (ESP), Sérgio Silva (POR), Moritz Reiter (GER)

20 January 2016	MHP Riesen Ludwigsburg (Germany)	94–84	(Italy) Umana Reyer Venezia	Ludwigsburg, Germany
20:00 (CET)	Scoring by quarter: 18–23, 26–22, 22–19, 28–20
	Pts: Cotton 17; Rebs: Brockman 8 Asts: Trice 6 PIR: Brockman, Cotton 20	Boxscore	Pts: Owens 17; Rebs: Owens 7 Asts: Green 6 PIR: Green, Owens 19	Arena: MHP Arena; Referees: Boris Shulga (UKR), Tomasz Trawicki (POL), Jean-Charles Collin (FRA)

27 January 2016	Zenit Saint Petersburg (Russia)	69–73	(Poland) Stelmet Zielona Góra	Saint Petersburg, Russia
18:00 (CET)	Scoring by quarter: 18–22, 15–22, 16–27, 20–13
	Pts: Toolson 23; Rebs: Koshcheev 6 Asts: Toolson 5 PIR: Toolson 22	Boxscore	Pts: Ponitka 18; Rebs: Ponitka 9 Asts: Bost 6 PIR: Ponitka 27	Arena: Sibur Arena; Referees: Milija Vojinović (SRB), Petros Papapetrou (GRE), Josip Radojković (CRO)

27 January 2016	Umana Reyer Venezia (Italy)	71–64	(Germany) MHP Riesen Ludwigsburg	Venice, Italy
20:30 (CET)	Scoring by quarter: 17–16, 19–12, 21–14, 14–22
	Pts: Goss 16; Rebs: Green 6 Asts: Green 6 PIR: Green 18	Boxscore	Pts: Cotton 17; Rebs: Brockman 15; Asts: Cotton, Johnson 3 PIR: Cotton 18	Arena: Palasport Taliercio; Referees: Emilio Pérez Pizarro (ESP), Sergey Zashchuk (UKR), Igor Mitrovski (MKD)

3 February 2016	Zenit Saint Petersburg (Russia)	79–72	(Italy) Umana Reyer Venezia	Saint Petersburg, Russia
18:15 (CET)	Scoring by quarter: 20–26, 24–13, 24–22, 11–11
	Pts: Timma 17; Rebs: Antipov, Pushkov 10; Asts: Timma 5 PIR: Antipov 24	Boxscore	Pts: Owens 16; Rebs: Bramos, Ortner 6 Asts: Bramos 4 PIR: Owens 16	Arena: Sibur Arena; Referees: Petar Obradović (BIH), David Romano (ISR), Radomir Vojinović (MNE)

3 February 2016	Stelmet Zielona Góra (Poland)	76–81	(Germany) MHP Riesen Ludwigsburg	Zielona Góra, Poland
19:00 (CET)	Scoring by quarter: 16–21, 26–23, 13–19, 21–18
	Pts: Moldoveanu 17; Rebs: Ponitka 9 Asts: Bost 4 PIR: Moldoveanu 22	Boxscore	Pts: Trice 14; Rebs: Brockman 17; Asts: Loesing 5 PIR: Trice 28	Arena: Centrum Rekreacyjno Sportowe; Referees: Carlos Cortés (ESP), Nicola Maestre (FRA), Uroš Obrknežević (SRB)

10 February 2016	MHP Riesen Ludwigsburg (Germany)	85–72	(Russia) Zenit Saint Petersburg	Ludwigsburg, Germany
20:30 (CET)	Scoring by quarter: 21–17, 24–20, 22–16, 18–19
	Pts: O'Neale 16; Rebs: O'Neale 9 Asts: Trice 5 PIR: Boone, Brockman 20	Boxscore	Pts: Koshcheev, Toolson 18; Rebs: Antipov 6 Asts: Motovilov, Toolson 4 PIR: Koshcheev 18	Arena: MHP Arena; Referees: Antonio Conde (ESP), Tomas Jasevičius (LTU), Saverio Lanzarini (ITA)

10 February 2016	Umana Reyer Venezia (Italy)	58–68	(Poland) Stelmet Zielona Góra	Venice, Italy
20:30 (CET)	Scoring by quarter: 18–22, 15–12, 15–20, 10–14
	Pts: Savović 15; Rebs: Owens 5 Asts: seven players 2 PIR: Owens 19	Boxscore	Pts: Bost 19; Rebs: Ponitka 12; Asts: Moldoveanu 3 PIR: Ponitka 19	Arena: Palasport Taliercio; Referees: Spiros Gkontas (GRE), Srđan Dožai (CRO), Clemens Fritz (GER)

=== Group M ===
Pos	Team	Pld	W	L	PF	PA	PD	Qualification
1	(Russia) UNICS	6	6	0	495	449	+46	Advance to Eighthfinals
2	(Russia) Nizhny Novgorod	6	3	3	490	482	+8	Advance to Eighthfinals
3	(Israel) Maccabi Tel Aviv	6	2	4	469	494	−25	
4	(Slovenia) Union Olimpija	6	1	5	440	469	−29	

Source: Eurocup Basketball

6 January 2016	UNICS (Russia)	84–74	(Russia) Nizhny Novgorod	Kazan, Russia
17:00 (CET)	Scoring by quarter: 23–16, 23–15, 19–27, 19–16
	Pts: Colom 25; Rebs: Kaimakoglou 8 Asts: Colom 8 PIR: Colom 41	Boxscore	Pts: Rudd 26; Rebs: Rudd 8 Asts: Khvostov 8 PIR: Rudd 30	Arena: Basket Hall Kazan; Referees: Petros Papapetrou (GRE), Siniša Herceg (CRO), Aleksandar Glišić (SRB)

6 January 2016	Maccabi Tel Aviv (Israel)	82–73	(Slovenia) Union Olimpija	Tel Aviv, Israel
20:05 (CET)	Scoring by quarter: 16–20, 24–15, 33–23, 9–15
	Pts: Rochestie 20; Rebs: Mbakwe 11; Asts: Farmar 5 PIR: Mbakwe 22	Boxscore	Pts: Zaķis 14; Rebs: Wright 7 Asts: Hrovat 6 PIR: Hrovat 18	Arena: Menora Mivtachim Arena; Referees: Antonio Conde (ESP), Tomas Jasevičius (LTU), Moritz Reiter (GER)

13 January 2016	Nizhny Novgorod (Russia)	83–87	(Israel) Maccabi Tel Aviv	Nizhny Novgorod, Russia
18:00 (CET)	Scoring by quarter: 18–20, 25–25, 20–18, 20–24
	Pts: Khvostov 14; Rebs: Rudd 7 Asts: Khvostov 10; PIR: Khvostov 22	Boxscore	Pts: Rochestie 17; Rebs: Mbakwe 14; Asts: Rochestie, Smith 4 PIR: Mbakwe 24	Arena: CEC Nagorny; Referees: Elias Koromilas (GRE), Petri Mäntylä (FIN), Haris Bijedić (BIH)

13 January 2016	Union Olimpija (Slovenia)	83–89	(Russia) UNICS	Ljubljana, Slovenia
20:30 (CET)	Scoring by quarter: 19–23, 17–18, 20–20, 27–28
	Pts: Wright 18; Rebs: Hrovat, Zagorac 6 Asts: Wright 5 PIR: Wright 22	Boxscore	Pts: Langford 27; Rebs: Langford 8 Asts: Colom 10; PIR: Colom 47	Arena: Arena Stožice; Referees: Miguel Ángel Pérez Pérez (ESP), Sérgio Silva (POR), Jean-Charles Collin (FRA)

20 January 2016	Maccabi Tel Aviv (Israel)	82–92	(Russia) UNICS	Tel Aviv, Israel
18:55 (CET)	Scoring by quarter: 23–24, 26–24, 19–23, 14–21
	Pts: Smith 20; Rebs: Ofoegbu 4 Asts: Rochestie 6 PIR: Pnini 16	Boxscore	Pts: Langford 30; Rebs: Williams 13; Asts: Colom, Ponkrashov 6 PIR: Langford 31	Arena: Menora Mivtachim Arena; Referees: Robert Vyklický (CZE), Óscar Perea (ESP), Sergey Zashchuk (UKR)

20 January 2016	Union Olimpija (Slovenia)	73–79	(Russia) Nizhny Novgorod	Ljubljana, Slovenia
20:30 (CET)	Scoring by quarter: 17–28, 18–20, 21–14, 17–17
	Pts: Lapornik 15; Rebs: Zagorac 10; Asts: Lapornik 4 PIR: Zagorac 17	Boxscore	Pts: Antonov 15; Rebs: Mahalbašić 12; Asts: Khvostov, Rudd 5 PIR: Antonov 19	Arena: Arena Stožice; Referees: Marek Ćmikiewicz (POL), Renaud Geller (BEL), Markos Michaelides (SUI)

26 January 2016	Nizhny Novgorod (Russia)	81–74	(Slovenia) Union Olimpija	Nizhny Novgorod, Russia
17:30 (CET)	Scoring by quarter: 30–18, 15–20, 18–20, 18–16
	Pts: Rudd 28; Rebs: Antonov 9 Asts: Mahalbašić 6 PIR: Rudd 31	Boxscore	Pts: Zagorac 18; Rebs: three players 4 Asts: Lapornik 5 PIR: Zagorac 16	Arena: CEC Nagorny; Referees: Jurgis Laurinavičius (LTU), Alessandro Martolini (ITA), David Romano (ISR)

27 January 2016	UNICS (Russia)	78–68	(Israel) Maccabi Tel Aviv	Kazan, Russia
18:00 (CET)	Scoring by quarter: 24–18, 19–14, 11–18, 24–18
	Pts: Langford 20; Rebs: Langford 9 Asts: Colom 8 PIR: Ponkrashov 24	Boxscore	Pts: Landesberg 16; Rebs: Mbakwe 12; Asts: Mekel 8 PIR: Mbakwe 21	Arena: Basket Hall Kazan; Referees: Damir Javor (SLO), Srđan Dožai (CRO), Torkild Rødsand (NOR)

3 February 2016	Nizhny Novgorod (Russia)	78–80	(Russia) UNICS	Nizhny Novgorod, Russia
17:30 (CET)	Scoring by quarter: 26–31, 25–22, 12–19, 15–8
	Pts: Antonov 27; Rebs: Antonov 7 Asts: Khvostov 9 PIR: Antonov 29	Boxscore	Pts: Ponkrashov 26; Rebs: Parakhouski 9 Asts: Colom 7 PIR: Ponkrashov 22	Arena: CEC Nagorny; Referees: Seffi Shemmesh (ISR), Marcin Kowalski (POL), Marko Juras (SRB)

3 February 2016	Union Olimpija (Slovenia)	73–66	(Israel) Maccabi Tel Aviv	Ljubljana, Slovenia
20:30 (CET)	Scoring by quarter: 19–17, 26–21, 15–18, 13–10
	Pts: Lešić 16; Rebs: Mesiček, Zaķis 7 Asts: Wright 3 PIR: Zaķis 18	Boxscore	Pts: Mekel 20; Rebs: Millsap 6 Asts: Mekel 4 PIR: Mekel 22	Arena: Arena Stožice; Referees: Petros Papapetrou (GRE), Aare Halliko (EST), Semen Ovinov (RUS)

10 February 2016	UNICS (Russia)	72–64	(Slovenia) Union Olimpija	Kazan, Russia
17:00 (CET)	Scoring by quarter: 18–15, 19–18, 20–15, 15–16
	Pts: Banić 14; Rebs: Likhodey, Parakhouski 5 Asts: Ponkrashov 8 PIR: Ponkrashov 19	Boxscore	Pts: Robinson 12; Rebs: Vučetić 6 Asts: four players 2 PIR: Wright 10	Arena: Basket Hall Kazan; Referees: Ioannis Foufis (GRE), Uroš Obrknežević (SRB), Amit Balak (ISR)

10 February 2016	Maccabi Tel Aviv (Israel)	84–95(OT)	(Russia) Nizhny Novgorod	Tel Aviv, Israel
19:05 (CET)	Scoring by quarter: 23–27, 18–20, 25–19, 15–15, Overtime: 3–14
	Pts: Mekel 21; Rebs: Mbakwe 11; Asts: Pnini 4 PIR: Mbakwe 25	Boxscore	Pts: Rudd 22; Rebs: Ivlev 9 Asts: Khvostov 10; PIR: Khvostov 33	Arena: Menora Mivtachim Arena; Referees: Carmelo Paternico (ITA), Miguel Ángel Pérez Niz (ESP), Tomasz Trawicki (POL)

=== Group N ===
Pos	Team	Pld	W	L	PF	PA	PD	Qualification
1	(Turkey) Galatasaray Odeabank	6	4	2	493	414	+79	Advance to Eighthfinals
2	(Spain) CAI Zaragoza	6	4	2	480	451	+29	Advance to Eighthfinals
3	(Italy) Banco di Sardegna Sassari	6	3	3	463	480	−17	
4	(Hungary) Szolnoki Olaj	6	1	5	403	494	−91	

Source: Eurocup Basketball

5 January 2016	Szolnoki Olaj (Hungary)	86–75	(Italy) Banco di Sardegna Sassari	Szolnok, Hungary
18:00 (CET)	Scoring by quarter: 23–8, 18–22, 20–24, 25–21
	Pts: Vojvoda 20; Rebs: Milošević 10; Asts: Burrell 7 PIR: Milošević 27	Boxscore	Pts: Eyenga 23; Rebs: Logan 9 Asts: Haynes 7 PIR: Eyenga 23	Arena: Tiszaligeti; Referees: Renaud Geller (BEL), Igor Mitrovski (MKD), Sergey Zashchuk (UKR)

6 January 2016	Galatasaray Odeabank (Turkey)	103–68	(Spain) CAI Zaragoza	Istanbul, Turkey
19:00 (CET)	Scoring by quarter: 20–13, 32–20, 29–20, 22–15
	Pts: Güler 25; Rebs: Dorsey 9 Asts: Güler 6 PIR: Dorsey, Güler 25	Boxscore	Pts: Jelovac 15; Rebs: Norel 5 Asts: Bellas 8 PIR: Jelovac 17	Arena: Abdi İpekçi Arena; Referees: Saverio Lanzarini (ITA), Tomislav Vovk (CRO), Jasmina Juras (SRB)

13 January 2016	CAI Zaragoza (Spain)	88–60	(Hungary) Szolnoki Olaj	Zaragoza, Spain
20:30 (CET)	Scoring by quarter: 27–11, 26–16, 19–16, 16–17
	Pts: Fotu 20; Rebs: Kravtsov 9 Asts: Sastre 6 PIR: Fotu, Kravtsov 20	Boxscore	Pts: Milošević 20; Rebs: Borisov, Jones 5 Asts: Vojvoda, Wittmann 2 PIR: Milošević 24	Arena: Pabellón Príncipe Felipe; Referees: Recep Ankaralı (TUR), Petar Obradović (BIH), Aleksandar Glišić (SRB)

13 January 2016	Banco di Sardegna Sassari (Italy)	79–74	(Turkey) Galatasaray Odeabank	Sassari, Italy
20:30 (CET)	Scoring by quarter: 13–18, 24–19, 18–22, 24–15
	Pts: Haynes, Logan 19; Rebs: Alexander 10; Asts: Haynes 5 PIR: Haynes 23	Boxscore	Pts: Schilb 25; Rebs: Schilb 9 Asts: Schilb 7 PIR: Schilb 32	Arena: PalaSerradimigni; Referees: Emilio Pérez Pizarro (ESP), Clemens Fritz (GER), Markos Michaelides (SUI)

20 January 2016	Galatasaray Odeabank (Turkey)	87–59	(Hungary) Szolnoki Olaj	Istanbul, Turkey
19:00 (CET)	Scoring by quarter: 34–14, 14–20, 22–14, 17–11
	Pts: Schilb 24; Rebs: Lasme 12; Asts: Schilb 6 PIR: Lasme 35	Boxscore	Pts: Milošević 15; Rebs: Milošević 7 Asts: Burrell 3 PIR: Milošević 23	Arena: Abdi İpekçi Arena; Referees: Nicola Maestre (FRA), Radomir Vojinović (MNE), Ilya Putenko (RUS)

20 January 2016	CAI Zaragoza (Spain)	87–75	(Italy) Banco di Sardegna Sassari	Zaragoza, Spain
20:30 (CET)	Scoring by quarter: 23–20, 27–16, 20–17, 17–22
	Pts: Jelovac 21; Rebs: Jelovac 6 Asts: Bellas 5 PIR: Jelovac 22	Boxscore	Pts: Alexander 24; Rebs: Varnado 5 Asts: Haynes 6 PIR: Alexander, Varnado 23	Arena: Pabellón Príncipe Felipe; Referees: Petros Papapetrou (GRE), Milija Vojinović (SRB), Ingus Baumanis (LAT)

27 January 2016	Szolnoki Olaj (Hungary)	54–74	(Turkey) Galatasaray Odeabank	Szolnok, Hungary
18:00 (CET)	Scoring by quarter: 13–18, 19–17, 13–12, 9–27
	Pts: Burrell 13; Rebs: Borisov 6 Asts: Wittmann 5 PIR: Burrell 11	Boxscore	Pts: Micov 25; Rebs: Dorsey 15; Asts: Güler 6 PIR: Micov 26	Arena: Tiszaligeti; Referees: Juan Carlos García González (ESP), Siniša Herceg (CRO), Ingus Baumanis (LAT)

27 January 2016	Banco di Sardegna Sassari (Italy)	75–72	(Spain) CAI Zaragoza	Sassari, Italy
20:30 (CET)	Scoring by quarter: 23–18, 21–10, 15–21, 16–23
	Pts: Haynes 16; Rebs: Varnado 8 Asts: Haynes 8 PIR: Haynes 22	Boxscore	Pts: Swing 13; Rebs: Benzing, Jelovac 6 Asts: Bellas 5 PIR: Benzing, Kravtsov 11	Arena: PalaSerradimigni; Referees: Tomas Jasevičius (LTU), Tomasz Trawicki (POL), Radomir Vojinović (MNE)

3 February 2016	CAI Zaragoza (Spain)	85–68	(Turkey) Galatasaray Odeabank	Zaragoza, Spain
20:30 (CET)	Scoring by quarter: 20–26, 22–13, 24–8, 19–21
	Pts: Kravtsov 16; Rebs: Kravtsov 10; Asts: Bellas 6 PIR: Kravtsov 30	Boxscore	Pts: Schilb 17; Rebs: Lasme 8 Asts: Schilb 4 PIR: Lasme 30	Arena: Pabellón Príncipe Felipe; Referees: Anastasios Piloidis (GRE), Igor Dragojević (MNE), Nick Van den Broeck (BEL)

3 February 2016	Banco di Sardegna Sassari (Italy)	90–74	(Hungary) Szolnoki Olaj	Sassari, Italy
20:30 (CET)	Scoring by quarter: 24–13, 18–23, 19–20, 29–18
	Pts: Logan 21; Rebs: Varnado 8 Asts: Mitchell 8 PIR: Alexander 30	Boxscore	Pts: Burrell 23; Rebs: three players 5 Asts: Burrell 7 PIR: Burrell 23	Arena: PalaSerradimigni; Referees: Antonio Conde (ESP), Joseph Bissang (FRA), Gentian Cici (ALB)

10 February 2016	Szolnoki Olaj (Hungary)	70–80	(Spain) CAI Zaragoza	Szolnok, Hungary
18:00 (CET)	Scoring by quarter: 26–17, 11–20, 20–26, 13–17
	Pts: Vojvoda 20; Rebs: Milošević 9 Asts: Wittmann 5 PIR: Vojvoda 20	Boxscore	Pts: Jelovac 21; Rebs: Jelovac 11; Asts: Bellas 7 PIR: Kravtsov 29	Arena: Tiszaligeti; Referees: Aare Halliko (EST), Petar Obradović (BIH), Josip Radojković (CRO)

10 February 2016	Galatasaray Odeabank (Turkey)	87–69	(Italy) Banco di Sardegna Sassari	Istanbul, Turkey
19:00 (CET)	Scoring by quarter: 18–13, 18–20, 21–16, 30–20
	Pts: Micov 16; Rebs: Lasme 14; Asts: Schilb 4 PIR: Lasme 35	Boxscore	Pts: Varnado 14; Rebs: Mitchell 5 Asts: Sacchetti, Stipčević 3 PIR: Stipčević 13	Arena: Abdi İpekçi Arena; Referees: Miguel Ángel Pérez Pérez (ESP), Igor Mitrovski (MKD), Semen Ovinov (RUS)
