= Pallacanestro Reggiana in European Competitions =

Italian basketball team in Reggio Emilia

Pallacanestro Reggiana are a basketball team based in Reggio Emilia, Italy. The Italian side played various seasons in Europe, winning 2013–14 EuroChallenge in Bologna against Triumph Lyubertsy.

== 1998-99 Korać Cup ==
=== First round ===
- (Germany) Fraport Skyliners - (Italy) Bipop Carire Reggio Emilia 71-68

Arena: Ballsporthalle, Frankfurt (Germany) , 7 October 1998

- (Italy) Bipop Carire Reggio Emilia - (Belgium) Telindus Oostende 71-90

Arena: PalaBigi, Reggio Emilia (Italy) , 14 October 1998

- (Spain) Unicaja Málaga - (Italy) Bipop Carire Reggio Emilia 59-65

Arena: Palacio de Deportes José María Martín Carpena, Málaga (Spain) , 21 October 1998

- (Italy) Bipop Carire Reggio Emilia - (Germany) Fraport Skyliners 92-84

Arena: PalaBigi, Reggio Emilia (Italy) , 4 November 1998

- (Belgium) Telindus Oostende - (Italy) Bipop Carire Reggio Emilia 99-55

Arena: Flanders Expo, Ghent (Belgium) , 10 November 1998

- (Italy) Bipop Carire Reggio Emilia - (Spain) Unicaja Málaga 85-72

Arena: PalaBigi, Reggio Emilia (Italy) , 18 November 1998

=== Second round ===
- (Italy) Bipop Carire Reggio Emilia - (Greece) Panionios B.C. 79-69

Arena: PalaBigi, Reggio Emilia (Italy) , 9 December 1998

- (Greece) Panionios B.C. - (Italy) Bipop Carire Reggio Emilia 81-58 (150-137 on aggregate)

Arena: Nea Smyrni Indoor Hall, Athens (Greece) , 16 December 1998

== 1999-2000 Korać Cup ==
=== First round ===
- (Israel) Maccabi Haifa B.C. - (Italy) Bipop Carire Reggio Emilia 85-60

Arena: Romema Arena, Haifa (Israel) , 13 October 1999

- (Italy) Bipop Carire Reggio Emilia - (North Macedonia) Nikol Fert 96-71

Arena: PalaBigi, Reggio Emilia (Italy) , 20 October 1999

- (Italy) Bipop Carire Reggio Emilia - (Israel) Maccabi Haifa B.C. 70-69

Arena: PalaBigi, Reggio Emilia (Italy) , 10 November 1999

- (North Macedonia) Nikol Fert - (Italy) Bipop Carire Reggio Emilia 75-71

Arena: Sports Hall Mladost, Gostivar (North Macedonia) , 17 November 1999

=== Second round ===
- (Italy) Bipop Carire Reggio Emilia - (Spain) Unicaja Málaga 67-74

Arena: PalaBigi, Reggio Emilia (Italy) , 8 December 1999

- (Spain) Unicaja Málaga - (Italy) Bipop Carire Reggio Emilia 61-55 (135-122 on aggregate)

Arena: Palacio de Deportes José María Martín Carpena, Málaga (Spain) , 15 December 1999

== 2002-03 FIBA Champions Cup ==
=== First round ===
- (Italy) Bipop Carire Reggio Emilia - (Netherlands) EiffelTowers Nijmegen 81-76

Arena: PalaBigi, Reggio Emilia (Italy) , 2 October 2002

- (France) SLUC Nancy - (Italy) Bipop Carire Reggio Emilia 75-72

Arena: Palais des Sports Jean Weille, Nancy (France) , 8 October 2002

- (Portugal) Porto Ferpinta - (Italy) Bipop Carire Reggio Emilia 111-82

Arena: Pavilhão de Matosinhos, Matosinhos (Portugal) , 15 October 2002

- (Italy) Bipop Carire Reggio Emilia - (Belgium) Quatro Basket Bree 87-66

Arena: PalaBigi, Reggio Emilia (Italy) , 22 October 2002

- (Portugal) CAB Madeira - (Italy) Bipop Carire Reggio Emilia 106-108

Arena: Pavilhão de Funchal, Funchal (Portugal) , 29 October 2002

- (Netherlands) EiffelTowers Nijmegen - (Italy) Bipop Carire Reggio Emilia 97-92

Arena: Sportal De Horstacker, Nijmegen (Netherlands) , 5 November 2002

- (Italy) Bipop Carire Reggio Emilia - (France) SLUC Nancy 78-72

Arena: PalaBigi, Reggio Emilia (Italy) , 12 November 2002

- (Italy) Bipop Carire Reggio Emilia - (Portugal) Porto Ferpinta 91-79

Arena: PalaBigi, Reggio Emilia (Italy) , 3 December 2002

- (Belgium) Quatro Basket Bree - (Italy) Bipop Carire Reggio Emilia 90-96

Arena: Expodroom, Bree (Belgium) , 10 December 2002

- (Italy) Bipop Carire Reggio Emilia - (Portugal) CAB Madeira 71-66

Arena: PalaBigi, Reggio Emilia (Italy) , 17 December 2002

=== Pan-European Phase ===
- (Spain) Unelco Tenerife - (Italy) Bipop Carire Reggio Emilia 79-67

Arena: Pabellón Insular Santiago Martín, San Cristóbal de La Laguna (Spain) , 4 February 2003

- (Italy) Bipop Carire Reggio Emilia - (Bulgaria) Lukoil Academic 71-94

Arena: PalaBigi, Reggio Emilia (Italy) , 11 February 2003

- (Italy) Bipop Carire Reggio Emilia - (Israel) Bnei HaSharon 97-90

Arena: PalaBigi, Reggio Emilia (Italy) , 25 February 2003

- (Italy) Bipop Carire Reggio Emilia - (Spain) Unelco Tenerife 67-88

Arena: PalaBigi, Reggio Emilia (Italy) , 4 March 2003

- (Bulgaria) Lukoil Academic - (Italy) Bipop Carire Reggio Emilia 94-64

Arena: Universiada Hall, Sofia (Bulgaria) , 18 March 2003

- Bnei HaSharon - (Italy) Bipop Carire Reggio Emilia 0-20 - The game was abandoned due to the ongoing Second Intifada, Reggio didn't travel to Israel.

== 2005-06 ULEB Cup ==
=== Regular season ===
- (Italy) Landi Renzo Reggio Emilia - (Greece) Panionios Forthnet 67-60

Arena: PalaBigi, Reggio Emilia (Italy) , 8 November 2005

- (Serbia and Montenegro) Hemofarm Vršac - (Italy) Landi Renzo Reggio Emilia 78-69

Arena: Millennium Centar, Vršac (Serbia and Montenegro) , 15 November 2005

- (Italy) Landi Renzo Reggio Emilia - (France) Adecco ASVEL 82-66

Arena: PalaBigi, Reggio Emilia (Italy) , 22 November 2005

- (Poland) Anwil Włocławek - (Italy) Landi Renzo Reggio Emilia 79-85

Arena: Hala Mistrzów, Włocławek (Poland) , 29 November 2005

- (Italy) Landi Renzo Reggio Emilia - (Netherlands) Demon Astronauts 93-59

Arena: PalaBigi, Reggio Emilia (Italy) , 6 December 2005

- (Greece) Panionios Forthnet - (Italy) Landi Renzo Reggio Emilia 79-75

Arena: Nea Smyrni Hall, Athens (Greece) , 13 December 2005

- (Italy) Landi Renzo Reggio Emilia - (Serbia and Montenegro) Hemofarm Vršac 83-62

Arena: PalaBigi, Reggio Emilia (Italy) , 20 December 2005

- (France) Adecco ASVEL - (Italy) Landi Renzo Reggio Emilia 81-73

Arena: Astroballe, Villeurbanne (France) , 3 January 2006

- (Italy) Landi Renzo Reggio Emilia - (Poland) Anwil Włocławek 83-78

Arena: PalaBigi, Reggio Emilia (Italy) , 10 January 2006

- (Netherlands) Demon Astronauts - (Italy) Landi Renzo Reggio Emilia 62-81

Arena: Sporthallen Zuid, Amsterdam (Netherlands) , 17 January 2006

=== Round of 16 ===
- (Latvia) BK Ventspils - (Italy) Landi Renzo Reggio Emilia 87-86

Arena: Ventspils Olympic Center Basketball Hall, Ventspils (Latvia) , 31 January 2006

- (Italy) Landi Renzo Reggio Emilia - (Latvia) BK Ventspils 86-83 (172-170 on aggregate)

Arena: PalaBigi, Reggio Emilia (Italy) , 7 February 2006

=== Quarter-finals ===
- (Serbia and Montenegro) Hemofarm Vršac - (Italy) Landi Renzo Reggio Emilia 88-72

Arena: Millennium Centar, Vršac (Serbia and Montenegro) , 28 February 2006

- (Italy) Landi Renzo Reggio Emilia - (Serbia and Montenegro) Hemofarm Vršac 75-77 (147-165 on aggregate)

Arena: PalaBigi, Reggio Emilia (Italy) , 7 March 2006

== 2013-14 FIBA EuroChallenge ==
=== Regular season ===
- (Italy) Grissin Bon Reggio Emilia - (Belgium) Okapi Aalstar 80-63

Arena: PalaBigi, Reggio Emilia (Italy) , 5 November 2013

- (Finland) KTP-Basket - (Italy) Grissin Bon Reggio Emilia 75-71

Arena: Straveco-Arena, Kotka (Finland) , 12 November 2013

- (Italy) Grissin Bon Reggio Emilia - (Netherlands) GasTerra Flames 78-61

Arena: PalaBigi, Reggio Emilia (Italy) , 19 November 2013

- (Belgium) Okapi Aalstar - (Italy) Grissin Bon Reggio Emilia 71-78

Arena: Okapi Forum, Aalst (Belgium) , 3 December 2013

- (Italy) Grissin Bon Reggio Emilia - (Finland) KTP-Basket 86-75

Arena: PalaBigi, Reggio Emilia (Italy) , 10 December 2013

- (Netherlands) GasTerra Flames - (Italy) Grissin Bon Reggio Emilia 85-60

Arena: MartiniPlaza, Groningen (Netherlands) , 17 December 2013

=== Last 16 ===
- (Italy) Grissin Bon Reggio Emilia - (Hungary) Szolnoki Olaj KK 90-68

Arena: PalaBigi, Reggio Emilia (Italy) , 14 January 2014

- (France) Cholet Basket - (Italy) Grissin Bon Reggio Emilia 81-78

Arena: La Meilleraie, Cholet (France) , 21 January 2014

- (Italy) Grissin Bon Reggio Emilia - (Slovenia) Krka Novo Mesto 82-71

Arena: PalaBigi, Reggio Emilia (Italy) , 28 January 2014

- (Hungary) Szolnoki Olaj KK - (Italy) Grissin Bon Reggio Emilia 90-78

Arena: Tiszaligeti Sportcsarnok, Szolnok (Hungary) , 11 February 2014

- (Italy) Grissin Bon Reggio Emilia - (France) Cholet Basket 82-65

Arena: PalaBigi, Reggio Emilia (Italy) , 18 February 2014

- (Slovenia) Krka Novo Mesto - (Italy) Grissin Bon Reggio Emilia 66-69

Arena: Leon Štukelj Hall, Novo Mesto (Slovenia) , 25 February 2014

=== Quarter-finals ===
- Game 1: (Italy) Grissin Bon Reggio Emilia - (Russia) BC Krasnye Krylia 75-63

Arena: PalaBigi, Reggio Emilia (Italy) , 11 March 2014

- Game 2: (Russia) BC Krasnye Krylia - (Italy) Grissin Bon Reggio Emilia 71-73 (Reggio wins the series 2-0 and advance to the Final Four)

Arena: MTL Arena, Samara (Russia) , 13 March 2014

=== Final four ===
- Semifinal: (Italy) Grissin Bon Reggio Emilia - (Turkey) Royal Halı Gaziantep 66-55

Arena: PalaDozza, Bologna (Italy) , 25 April 2014

- Final: (Russia) Tryumph Lyubertsy - (Italy) Grissin Bon Reggio Emilia 65-79 (Reggio wins the EuroChallenge)

Arena: PalaDozza, Bologna (Italy) , 27 April 2014

== 2014-15 EuroCup ==
- (Italy) Grissin Bon Reggio Emilia - (Germany) Brose Baskets 70-67

Arena: PalaDozza, Bologna (Italy) , 15 October 2014

- (France) Paris-Levallois Basket - (Italy) Grissin Bon Reggio Emilia 88-76

Arena: Palais des sports Marcel-Cerdan, Paris (France) , 21 October 2014

- (Italy) Grissin Bon Reggio Emilia - (France) SIG Strasbourg 59-66

Arena: PalaDozza, Bologna (Italy) , 28 October 2014

- (Spain) CAI Zaragoza - (Italy) Grissin Bon Reggio Emilia 93-79

Arena: Pabellón Príncipe Felipe, Zaragoza (Spain) , 4 November 2014

- (Italy) Grissin Bon Reggio Emilia - (Germany) Telekom Baskets Bonn 84-85

Arena: PalaDozza, Bologna (Italy) , 12 November 2014

- (Germany) Brose Baskets - (Italy) Grissin Bon Reggio Emilia 75-61

Arena: Brose Arena, Bamberg (Germany) , 19 November 2014

- (Italy) Grissin Bon Reggio Emilia - (France) Paris-Levallois Basket 78-72

Arena: PalaDozza, Bologna (Italy) , 25 November 2014

- (France) SIG Strasbourg - (Italy) Grissin Bon Reggio Emilia 74-66

Arena: Rhénus Sport, Strasbourg (France) , 3 December 2014

- (Italy) Grissin Bon Reggio Emilia - (Spain) CAI Zaragoza 75-87

Arena: PalaDozza, Bologna (Italy) , 9 December 2014

- (Germany) Telekom Baskets Bonn - (Italy) Grissin Bon Reggio Emilia 101-87

Arena: Telekom Dome, Bonn (Germany) , 17 December 2014

== 2015-16 EuroCup ==
=== Regular season ===
- (Italy) Grissin Bon Reggio Emilia - (Italy) Enel Brindisi 82-79

Arena: PalaBigi, Reggio Emilia (Italy) , 14 October 2015

- (Germany) ALBA Berlin - (Italy) Grissin Bon Reggio Emilia 82-76

Arena: Mercedes-Benz Arena, Berlin (Germany) , 20 October 2015

- (Germany) MHP Riesen Ludwigsburg - (Italy) Grissin Bon Reggio Emilia 65-76

Arena: MHPArena, Ludwigsburg (Germany) , 28 October 2015

- (Italy) Grissin Bon Reggio Emilia - (France) Le Mans Sarthe Basket 93-82

Arena: PalaBigi, Reggio Emilia (Italy) , 3 November 2015

- (Spain) Herbalife Gran Canaria - (Italy) Grissin Bon Reggio Emilia 76-67

Arena: Gran Canaria Arena, Las Palmas (Spain) , 10 November 2015

- (Italy) Enel Brindisi - (Italy) Grissin Bon Reggio Emilia 87-81

Arena: PalaPentassuglia, Mesagne (Italy) , 18 November 2015

- (Italy) Grissin Bon Reggio Emilia - (Germany) ALBA Berlin 74-71

Arena: PalaBigi, Reggio Emilia (Italy) , 25 November 2015

- (Italy) Grissin Bon Reggio Emilia - (Germany) MHP Riesen Ludwigsburg 69-68

Arena: PalaBigi, Reggio Emilia (Italy) , 2 December 2015

- (France) Le Mans Sarthe Basket - (Italy) Grissin Bon Reggio Emilia 71-87

Arena: Antarès, Le Mans (France) , 9 December 2015

- (Italy) Grissin Bon Reggio Emilia - (Spain) Herbalife Gran Canaria 73-78

Arena: PalaBigi, Reggio Emilia (Italy) , 16 December 2015

=== Last 32 ===
- (Italy) Dolomiti Energia Trento - (Italy) Grissin Bon Reggio Emilia 82-63

Arena: PalaTrento, Trento (Italy) , 6 January 2016

- (Italy) Grissin Bon Reggio Emilia - (Turkey) Pınar Karşıyaka 88-81

Arena: PalaBigi, Reggio Emilia (Italy) , 13 January 2016

- (Turkey) Trabzonspor Medical Park - (Italy) Grissin Bon Reggio Emilia 82-76

Arena: Hayri Gür Arena, Trabzon (Turkey) , 20 January 2016

- (Italy) Grissin Bon Reggio Emilia - (Turkey) Trabzonspor Medical Park 89-76

Arena: PalaBigi, Reggio Emilia (Italy) , 27 January 2016

- (Italy) Grissin Bon Reggio Emilia - (Italy) Dolomiti Energia Trento 72-84

Arena: PalaBigi, Reggio Emilia (Italy) , 3 February 2016

- (Turkey) Pınar Karşıyaka - (Italy) Grissin Bon Reggio Emilia 109-66

Arena: Mustafa Kemal Atatürk Karşıyaka Sports Hall, İzmir (Turkey) , 10 February 2016

== 2017-18 EuroCup ==
=== Regular season ===
- (Montenegro) Budućnost VOLI Podgorica - (Italy) Grissin Bon Reggio Emilia 82-74

Arena: Morača Sports Center, Podgorica (Montenegro) , 11 October 2017

- (Italy) Grissin Bon Reggio Emilia - (Turkey) Galatasaray Odeabank 74-71

Arena: PalaBigi, Reggio Emilia (Italy) , 18 October 2017

- (Lithuania) BC Lietkabelis - (Italy) Grissin Bon Reggio Emilia 75-82

Arena: Cido Arena, Panevėžys (Lithuania) , 25 October 2017

- (Italy) Grissin Bon Reggio Emilia - (Israel) Hapoel Bank Yahav Jerusalem 61-63

Arena: PalaBigi, Reggio Emilia (Italy) , 1 November 2017

- (Germany) Bayern Munich - (Italy) Grissin Bon Reggio Emilia 83-58

Arena: Audi Dome, Munich (Germany) , 8 November 2017

- (Italy) Grissin Bon Reggio Emilia - (Montenegro) Budućnost VOLI Podgorica 77-71

Arena: PalaBigi, Reggio Emilia (Italy) , 15 November 2017

- (Turkey) Galatasaray Odeabank - (Italy) Grissin Bon Reggio Emilia 82-72

Arena: Sinan Erdem Dome, Istanbul, 6 December 2017

- (Italy) Grissin Bon Reggio Emilia - (Lithuania) BC Lietkabelis 82-85 OT

Arena: PalaBigi, Reggio Emilia (Italy) , 13 December 2017

- (Israel) Hapoel Bank Yahav Jerusalem - (Italy) Grissin Bon Reggio Emilia 66-79

Arena: Pais Arena Jerusalem, Jerusalem (Israel) , 20 December 2017

- (Italy) Grissin Bon Reggio Emilia - (Germany) Bayern Munich 90-82

Arena: PalaBigi, Reggio Emilia (Italy) , 27 December 2017

=== Top 16 ===
- (Italy) Grissin Bon Reggio Emilia - (France) Limoges CSP 87-54

Arena: PalaBigi, Reggio Emilia (Italy) , 2 January 2018

- (France) ASVEL Villeurbanne - (Italy) Grissin Bon Reggio Emilia 68-64

Arena: Astroballe, Villeurbanne, (France) , 10 January 2018

- (Russia) UNICS Kazan - (Italy) Grissin Bon Reggio Emilia 69-71

Arena: Basket-Hall Kazan, Kazan, (Russia) , 16 January 2018

- (Italy) Grissin Bon Reggio Emilia - (Russia) UNICS Kazan 76-75

Arena: PalaBigi, Reggio Emilia (Italy) , 23 January 2018

- (France) Limoges CSP - (Italy) Grissin Bon Reggio Emilia 80-71

Arena: Palais des Sports de Beaublanc, Limoges, (France) , 30 January 2018

- (Italy) Grissin Bon Reggio Emilia - (France) ASVEL Villeurbanne 75-68

Arena: PalaBigi, Reggio Emilia (Italy) , 6 February 2018

=== Quarter-finals ===
- Game 1: (Italy) Grissin Bon Reggio Emilia - (Russia) B.C. Zenit Saint Petersburg 75-61

Arena: PalaBigi, Reggio Emilia (Italy) , 6 March 2018

- Game 2: (Russia) B.C. Zenit Saint Petersburg - (Italy) Grissin Bon Reggio Emilia 91-77

Arena: Yubileyny Sports Palace, Saint Petersburg (Russia) , 9 March 2018

- Game 3: (Italy) Grissin Bon Reggio Emilia - (Russia) B.C. Zenit Saint Petersburg 105-99 (Reggio wins the series 2-1 and advances to the semifinals)

Arena: PalaBigi, Reggio Emilia (Italy) , 14 March 2018

=== Semifinals ===
- Game 1: (Russia) Lokomotiv Kuban - (Italy) Grissin Bon Reggio Emilia 82-65

Arena: Basket-Hall Krasnodar, Krasnodar (Italy) , 20 March 2018

- Game 2: (Italy) Grissin Bon Reggio Emilia - (Russia) Lokomotiv Kuban 69-79

Arena: PalaBigi, Reggio Emilia (Italy) , 23 March 2018

== 2020-21 FIBA Europe Cup ==
=== Regular season ===
- (Belgium) Belfius Mons-Hainaut - (Italy) UNAHOTELS Reggio Emilia 69-70

Arena: Maaspoort, Den Bosch (Netherlands) , 26 January 2021

- (Italy) UNAHOTELS Reggio Emilia - (Greece) Iraklis Thessaloniki 74-78

Arena: Maaspoort, Den Bosch (Netherlands) , 27 January 2021

- (Hungary) Egis Körmend - (Italy) UNAHOTELS Reggio Emilia 79-88

Arena: Maaspoort, Den Bosch (Netherlands) , 29 January 2021

=== Round of 16 ===
- (Romania) CSU Sibiu - (Italy) UNAHOTELS Reggio Emilia 61-65

Arena: Oradea Arena, Oradea (Romania) , 23 March 2021

=== Quarter-finals ===
- (Italy) UNAHOTELS Reggio Emilia - (Romania) CSM Oradea 64-71

Arena: Oradea Arena, Oradea (Romania) , 25 March 2021

== 2021-22 FIBA Europe Cup ==
=== Regular season ===
- (Italy) UNAHOTELS Reggio Emilia - (Israel) Hapoel Gilboa Galil 93-70

Arena: Unipol Arena, Casalecchio di Reno (Italy) , 13 October 2021

- (Russia) Avtodor Saratov - (Italy) UNAHOTELS Reggio Emilia 91-84

Arena: Ice Sports Palace Kristall, Saratov (Russia) , 20 October 2021

- (Italy) UNAHOTELS Reggio Emilia - (Spain) Casademont Zaragoza 76-67

Arena: Unipol Arena, Casalecchio di Reno (Italy) , 27 October 2021

- (Israel) Hapoel Gilboa Galil - (Italy) UNAHOTELS Reggio Emilia 70-87

Arena: Gan Ner Sports Hall, Gan Ner (Israel) , 3 November 2021

- (Italy) UNAHOTELS Reggio Emilia - (Russia) Avtodor Saratov 80-77

Arena: Unipol Arena, Casalecchio di Reno (Italy) , 10 November 2021

- (Spain) Casademont Zaragoza - (Italy) UNAHOTELS Reggio Emilia 82-77

Arena: Pabellón Príncipe Felipe, Zaragoza (Spain) , 17 November 2021

=== Second Round ===
- (Germany) HAKRO Merlins Crailsheim - (Italy) UNAHOTELS Reggio Emilia 80-84

Arena: Arena Hohenlohe, Ilshofen (Germany) , 8 December 2021

- (Ukraine) Kyiv-Basket - (Italy) UNAHOTELS Reggio Emilia 79-80

Arena: Palace of Sports, Kyiv (Ukraine) , 15 December 2021

- (Italy) UNAHOTELS Reggio Emilia - (Belgium) Telenet Giants Antwerp 86-72

Arena: Unipol Arena, Casalecchio di Reno (Italy) , 12 January 2022

- (Belgium) Telenet Giants Antwerp - (Italy) UNAHOTELS Reggio Emilia 101-59

Arena: Lotto Arena, Antwerp (Belgium) , 8 February 2022

- (Italy) UNAHOTELS Reggio Emilia - (Germany) HAKRO Merlins Crailsheim 79-70

Arena: Unipol Arena, Casalecchio di Reno (Italy) , 11 February 2022

- UNAHOTELS Reggio Emilia - Kyiv-Basket 20-0 (the game was forfeited by Kyiv-Basket as they were not able to fly to Italy due to the geopolitical tensions in the prelude to the 2022 Russian invasion of Ukraine)

Arena: Unipol Arena, Casalecchio di Reno (Italy) , 15 February 2022

=== Quarter-finals ===
- Game 1: (Poland) Legia Warsaw - (Italy) UNAHOTELS Reggio Emilia 68-71

Arena: Hala Bemowo, Warsaw (Poland) , 9 March 2022

- Game 2: (Italy) UNAHOTELS Reggio Emilia - (Poland) Legia Warsaw 80-75

Arena: Unipol Arena, Casalecchio di Reno (Italy) , 16 March 2022

=== Semifinals ===
- Game 1: (Denmark) Bakken Bears - (Italy) UNAHOTELS Reggio Emilia 74-72

Arena: Vejlby-Risskov Hallen, Aarhus (Denmark) , 30 March 2022

- Game 2: (Italy) UNAHOTELS Reggio Emilia - (Denmark) Bakken Bears 92-72

Arena: Unipol Arena, Casalecchio di Reno (Italy) , 6 April 2022

=== Finals ===
- Game 1: (Italy) UNAHOTELS Reggio Emilia - (Turkey) Bahçeşehir 69-72

Arena: Unipol Arena, Casalecchio di Reno (Italy) , 20 April 2022

- Game 2: (Turkey) Bahçeşehir - (Italy) UNAHOTELS Reggio Emilia 90-74

Arena: Ülker Sports and Event Hall, Istanbul (Turkey) , 27 April 2022

== 2022-23 Basketball Champions League ==
=== Regular season ===
- (Germany) Telekom Baskets Bonn - (Italy) UNAHOTELS Reggio Emilia 84-88

Arena: Telekom Dome, Bonn (Germany) , 5 October 2022

- (Italy) UNAHOTELS Reggio Emilia - (Greece) AEK Athens 73-84

Arena: PalaBigi, Reggio Emilia (Italy) , 12 October 2022

- (Turkey) Pınar Karşıyaka - (Italy) UNAHOTELS Reggio Emilia 83-76

Arena: Karşıyaka Arena, İzmir (Turkey) , 25 October 2022

- (Italy) UNAHOTELS Reggio Emilia - (Turkey) Pınar Karşıyaka 74-70

Arena: PalaBigi, Reggio Emilia (Italy) , 22 November 2022

- (Greece) AEK Athens - (Italy) UNAHOTELS Reggio Emilia 68-59

Arena: Ano Liosia Olympic Hall, Athens (Greece) , 7 December 2022

- (Italy) UNAHOTELS Reggio Emilia - (Germany) Telekom Baskets Bonn 66-90

Arena: PalaBigi, Reggio Emilia (Italy) , 21 December 2022

== 2024-25 Basketball Champions League ==
=== Regular season ===
- (Italy) UNAHOTELS Reggio Emilia - (Lithuania) Rytas Vilnius 77-67

Arena: PalaBigi, Reggio Emilia (Italy) , 1 October 2024

- (Hungary) Falco-Vulcano Szombathely - (Italy) UNAHOTELS Reggio Emilia 78-71

Arena: Arena Savaria, Szombathely (Hungary) , 16 October 2024

- (Poland) Śląsk Wrocław - (Italy) UNAHOTELS Reggio Emilia 65-73

Arena: Centennial Hall, Wrocław (Poland) , 29 October 2024

- (Italy) UNAHOTELS Reggio Emilia - (Poland) Śląsk Wrocław 74-70

Arena: PalaBigi, Reggio Emilia (Italy) , 12 November 2024

- (Lithuania) Rytas Vilnius - (Italy) UNAHOTELS Reggio Emilia 94-84

Arena: Arena Vilnius, Vilnius (Lithuania) , 4 December 2024

- (Italy) UNAHOTELS Reggio Emilia - (Hungary) Falco-Vulcano Szombathely 79-88

Arena: PalaBigi, Reggio Emilia (Italy) , 18 December 2024

=== Play-in ===
- Game 1: (Germany) Telekom Baskets Bonn - (Italy) UNAHOTELS Reggio Emilia 91-94

Arena: Telekom Dome, Bonn (Germany) , 8 January 2025

- Game 2: (Italy) UNAHOTELS Reggio Emilia - (Germany) Telekom Baskets Bonn 73-70

Arena: PalaBigi, Reggio Emilia (Italy) , 15 January 2025

=== Round of 16 ===
- (Spain) La Laguna Tenerife - (Italy) UNAHOTELS Reggio Emilia 91-69

Arena: Pabellón Insular Santiago Martín, La Laguna (Spain) , 28 January 2025

- (Turkey) Aliağa Petkim Spor - (Italy) UNAHOTELS Reggio Emilia 87-91

Arena: Enka Spor Hall, Aliağa (Turkey) , 4 February 2025

- (Italy) UNAHOTELS Reggio Emilia - (Spain) BAXI Manresa 85-70

Arena: PalaBigi, Reggio Emilia (Italy) , 5 March 2025

- (Italy) UNAHOTELS Reggio Emilia - (Spain) La Laguna Tenerife 74-84

Arena: PalaBigi, Reggio Emilia (Italy) , 12 March 2025

- (Spain) BAXI Manresa - (Italy) UNAHOTELS Reggio Emilia 96-90

Arena: Pavelló Nou Congost, Manresa (Spain) , 18 March 2025

- (Italy) UNAHOTELS Reggio Emilia - (Turkey) Aliağa Petkim Spor 77-70

Arena: PalaBigi, Reggio Emilia (Italy) , 25 March 2025

=== Quarter-finals ===
- Game 1: (Spain) Unicaja Málaga - (Italy) UNAHOTELS Reggio Emilia 105-68

Arena: Palacio de Deportes José María Martín Carpena, Málaga (Spain) , 9 April 2025

- Game 2: (Italy) UNAHOTELS Reggio Emilia - (Spain) Unicaja Málaga 72-82

Arena: PalaBigi, Reggio Emilia (Italy) , 15 April 2025

== 2025-26 Basketball Champions League ==
=== Qualifying-round Quarter-finals ===
- (Italy) UNAHOTELS Reggio Emilia - (North Macedonia) Pelister 99-87

Arena: Arena Samokov, Samokov (Bulgaria) , 19 September 2025

=== Qualifying-round Semifinals ===
- (Belgium) Windrose Giants Antwerp - (Italy) UNAHOTELS Reggio Emilia 81-78

Arena: Arena Samokov, Samokov (Bulgaria) , 21 September 2025

== 2025-26 FIBA Europe Cup ==
=== Regular season ===
- (France) JDA Dijon - (Italy) UNAHOTELS Reggio Emilia 88-96

Arena: Palais des Sports Jean-Michel Geoffroy, Dijon (France) , 15 October 2025

- (Italy) UNAHOTELS Reggio Emilia - (Kosovo) Bashkimi 100-65

Arena: PalaBigi, Reggio Emilia (Italy) , 22 October 2025

- (Italy) UNAHOTELS Reggio Emilia - (Croatia) Cibona Zagreb 73-75

Arena: PalaBigi, Reggio Emilia (Italy) , 29 October 2025

- (Italy) UNAHOTELS Reggio Emilia - (France) JDA Dijon 76-79

Arena: PalaBigi, Reggio Emilia (Italy) , 4 November 2025

- (Kosovo) Bashkimi - (Italy) UNAHOTELS Reggio Emilia 77-76

Arena: Sezai Surroi, Prizren (Kosovo) , 12 November 2025

- (Croatia) Cibona Zagreb - (Italy) UNAHOTELS Reggio Emilia 65-73

Arena: Dražen Petrović Basketball Hall, Zagreb (Croatia) , 19 November 2025

=== Second round ===
- (Croatia) Cedevita Junior - (Italy) UNAHOTELS Reggio Emilia 90-94

Arena: Dražen Petrović Basketball Hall, Zagreb (Croatia) , 10 December 2025

- (Italy) UNAHOTELS Reggio Emilia - (Romania) CSM Raiffeisen Oradea 90-59

Arena: PalaBigi, Reggio Emilia (Italy) , 17 December 2025

- (Italy) UNAHOTELS Reggio Emilia - (Bosnia and Herzegovina) Bosna BH Telecom Sarajevo 93-67

Arena: PalaBigi, Reggio Emilia (Italy) , 14 January 2026

- (Italy) UNAHOTELS Reggio Emilia - (Croatia) Cedevita Junior 83-60

Arena: PalaBigi, Reggio Emilia (Italy) , 21 January 2026

- (Romania) CSM Raiffeisen Oradea - (Italy) UNAHOTELS Reggio Emilia 81-77

Arena: Oradea Arena, Oradea (Romania) , 4 February 2026

- (Bosnia and Herzegovina) Bosna BH Telecom Sarajevo - (Italy) UNAHOTELS Reggio Emilia 85-71

Arena: Skenderija Hall, Sarajevo (Bosnia and Herzegovina) , 11 February 2026

=== Quarter-finals ===
- Game 1: (Italy) UNAHOTELS Reggio Emilia - (Spain) UCAM Murcia 84-85

Arena: PalaBigi, Reggio Emilia (Italy) , 11 March 2026

- Game 2: (Spain) UCAM Murcia - (Italy) UNAHOTELS Reggio Emilia 77-63

Arena: Palacio de Deportes de Murcia, Murcia (Spain) , 18 March 2026
