= Andriy Diachkov =

Ukrainian volleyball player (born 1985)

Andrii Diachkov
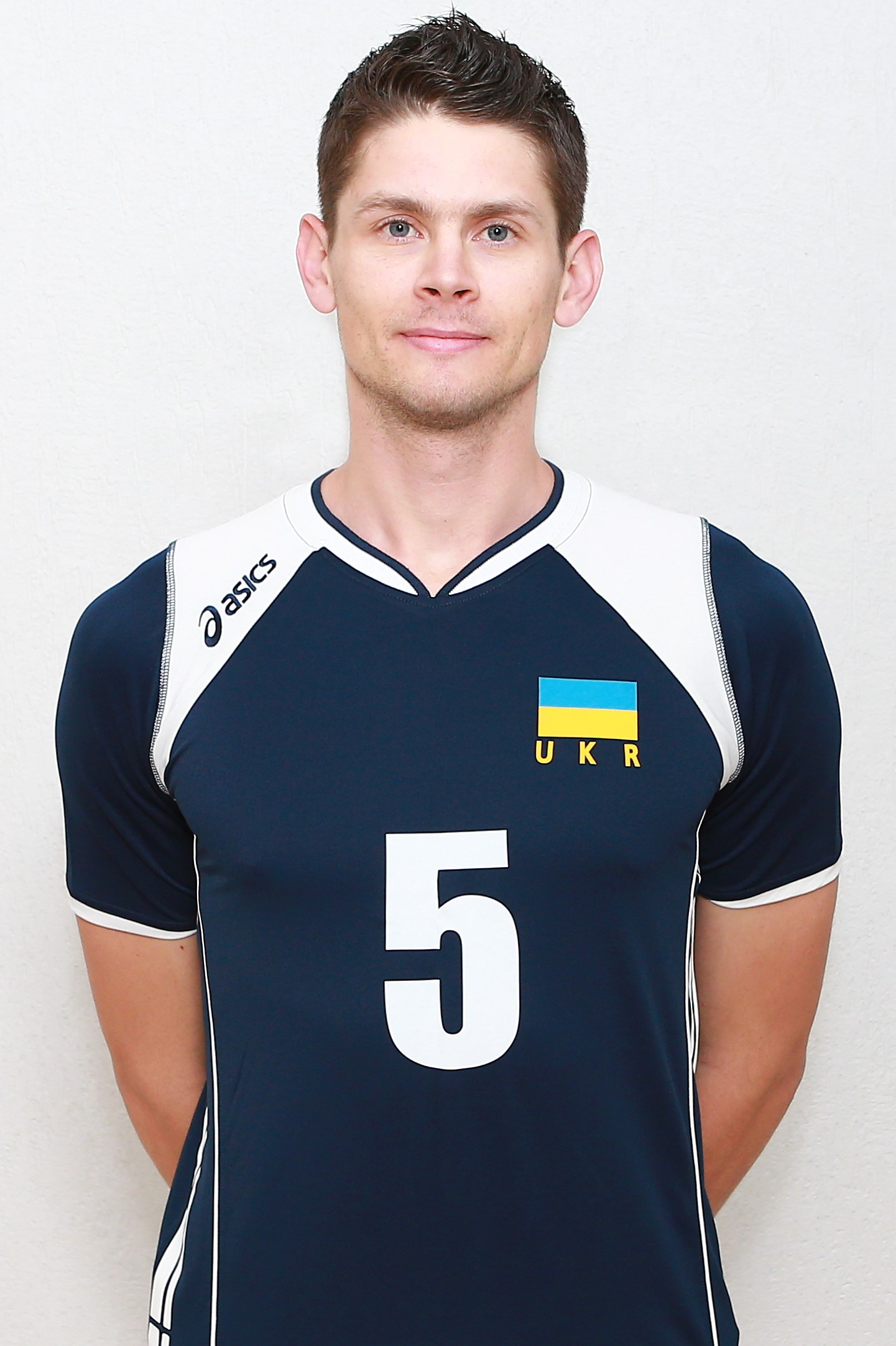

Personal information
- Nationality: Ukrainian
- Born: 28 April 1985 (age 41); Leninsk, Kazakhstan
- Height: 2.02 m (6 ft 8 in)
- Weight: 102 kg (225 lb)
- Spike: 355 cm (140 in)
- Block: 335 cm (132 in)

Volleyball information
- Position: Outside hitter/Opposite
- Current club: Montpellier Volley UC
- Number: 1

Career
Years	Teams
2005–2007; 2007–2009; 2009–2010; 2010–2011; 2011; 2011; 2011–2012; 2012–2013; 2013–2014; 2014–2015; 2015–2016; 2016-	Azot Cherkassy; Lokomotyv Kharkiv; Esseti Carilo Loreto; Yoga Forli; Lokomotiv Novosibirsk; Casa Modena; Andreoli Latina; Conad Reggio Emilia; Foinikas Syros; Olympiacos; Volley Asul Lyon; Montpellier Volley UC

National team
2008-	Ukraine

Andrii Diachkov (born 28 April 1985) is a Ukrainian volleyball player, a member of Ukraine men's national volleyball team and Montpellier UC.

== Career ==
=== Clubs ===
==== Ukrainian period ====
Andrii Diachkov started his volleyball career in the Ukrainian Superleague in 2005. He played for Azot-Spartack Cherkassy over two seasons in 2005/2007. With this team he won the Championship of Ukraine in 2005/2006. In the season 2006/2007 he became the Vice champion of Ukraine and took second place in Ukrainian Cup.

The next two seasons (2007/2009) Diachkov performed for Lokomotyv Kharkiv. He became a two time Ukrainian Cup winner, Champion of Ukraine and Vice champion of Ukraine. In volleyball season of 2008/2009 he became the best outside-hitter of the Championship.

==== Italian period ====
In Italy Andrii played 3 years in Serie A1 of the Italian Volleyball League and 1 year in Seria A2:

- Esseti Carilo Loreto (2009-2010)
- Yoga Forli (2010-2011)
- Modena Volley (2011)
- Top Volley Latina (2011-2012)
- Volley Tricolore (Seria A2) (2012-2013)

==== Russian period ====
Andrii Diachkov also played in 2011 in VC Lokomotiv Novosibirsk.

==== Greek period ====
After his Italian adventure he signed a contract with Greek Foinikas Syros V.C. Diachkov helped the Foinikas claim second place in the League Cup tournament. The season 2014/2015 he played for Olympiacos S.C. where he won the League Cup title and took second place in the Championship of Greece.

==== French period ====
From 2016 Andrii is playing in French Pro A League: Asul Lyon (2015/2016), Montpellier UC (2016/2018). In the 2016/2017 season he was selected in Dream Team of the regular season of French championship. Together with Montpellier UC Diachkov gained 3rd place in season 2016/2017.

=== National team ===
He debuted with the Ukraine men's national volleyball team in 2008. With Ukraine national volleyball team Andrii participated:

- 2009 CEV European Championship qualification
- 2012 Olympic Games - European Qualification
- 2013 CEV European Championship qualification
- 2014 FIVB World Championship - European Qualification
- 2015 CEV Volleyball European Championship
- 2017 FIVB Volleyball World Championship European Qualification

== Sporting achievements ==
=== Clubs ===
- 2005/2006 Ukrainian Championship, with Azot-Spartack, Cherkassy
- 2006/2007 Ukrainian Championship, with Azot-Spartack, Cherkassy
- 2007/2008 Ukrainian Cup, with Lokomotiv Kharkiv
- 2007/2008 Ukrainian Championship, with Lokomotiv Kharkiv
- 2008/2009 Ukrainian Championship, with Lokomotiv Kharkiv
- 2008/2009 Ukrainian Cup, with Lokomotiv Kharkiv
- 2014/2015 League Cup of Greece, with Olympiacos S.C.
- 2014/2015 Championship of Greece, with Olympiacos S.C.
- 2015/2016 5th place European CEV Cup, with Asul Lyon
- 2016/2017 Championship of France, with Montpellier VUC

=== Individual ===
- 2005/2006 Ukrainian Championship - Most Valuable Player Game Day 3
- 2008/2009 Ukrainian Championship - Best Outside Hitter
- 2014/2015 Championship of Greece - Most Valuable Player Game Day 9
- 2014/2015 Championship of Greece - Most Valuable Player Game Day 5
- 2016/2017 Championship of France AllStar Team of The Regular Season
