= Volley Tricolore =

Conad Reggio Emilia
- Full name: Volley Tricolore Reggio Emilia
- Short name: Conad Reggio Emilia
- Founded: 2012
- Ground: PalaBigi; Reggio Emilia (Capacity: 4.600)
- Chairman: Giulio Bertaccini
- Manager: Henk-Jan Held
- League: Italian Volleyball League
- Website: Club home page

Uniforms
Home	Away

Volley Tricolore is a professional volleyball team based in Reggio Emilia, Italy. It plays in the second level of the Italian Volleyball League. The club was formed in 2012 with the merging of the local teams of Correggio and Scandiano with Cavriago, which was playing the games of the Italian second tier in Reggio Emilia. Volley Tricolore plays its home games in PalaBigi, an arena located in the city and shared with Pallacanestro Reggiana.

== History ==
Men's volleyball always had a good tradition in Reggio Emilia, but every team (La Torre, Volley Reggiano and Latte Giglio) that played in the highest level got relegated or dismantled due to bankruptcy during the years; however international players like Henk-Jan Held and Krysztof Stelmach and famous coach Ljubomir Travica have been involved in Reggio Emilia's volley. Volley Tricolore took the space of Edilesse Cavriago in the Italian second division, but after the first season (2012–13) the club auto-relegated to the third division due to economic difficulties due to the abandon of the project by Correggio. In the last three seasons, Tricolore won promotion back to the Serie A2, and played two times in the Promotion Playoffs.

== Notable players and coaches ==
- Santiago Orduna (Argentina)
- Andrii Diachkov (Ukraine)
- Alessandro Tondo (Italy)
- Davide Benaglia (Italy)
- Michel Guemart (Italy)
- Yvan Arthur Kody (Cameroon)
- Leano Cetrullo (Italy)
- Ludovico Dolfo (Italy)
- Giulio Silva (Italy)
- Thomas Douglas Powell (Australia)

== Team ==
Team roster - season 2017/2018
Conad Reggio Emilia
No.	Name	Date of birth	Position
1	(Italy) Simone Bonante	April 6, 1992	setter
2	(Puerto Rico) Arturo Iglesias	November 22, 1995	setter
4	(Nigeria) Samuel Onwuelo	April 18, 1997	opposite
5	(Italy) Davide Cester	March 5, 1997	opposite
6	(Italy) Andrea Ippolito	November 16, 1985	outside hitter
7	(Italy) Alberto Bellini	June 7, 1987	outside hitter
8	(Netherlands) Tim Held	April 17, 1998	outside hitter
9	(Austria) Lorenz Koraimann	May 7, 1993	outside hitter
10	(Italy) Nicola Sesto(C)	May 11, 1987	middle blocker
11	(Italy) Matteo Bortolozzo	August 1, 1989	middle blocker
12	(Italy) Alessandro Arienti	December 7, 1993	middle blocker
14	(Italy) Jacopo Ferrari	May 10, 1998	middle blocker
15	(Italy) Davide Morgese(L)	June 16, 1996	libero
16	(Italy) Michele Raffaele (L)	March 6, 1999	libero
Head coach: (Netherlands) Henk-Jan Held; Assistant: (Italy) Paolo Zambolin
