= Dominique Johnson =

American basketball player (born 1987)

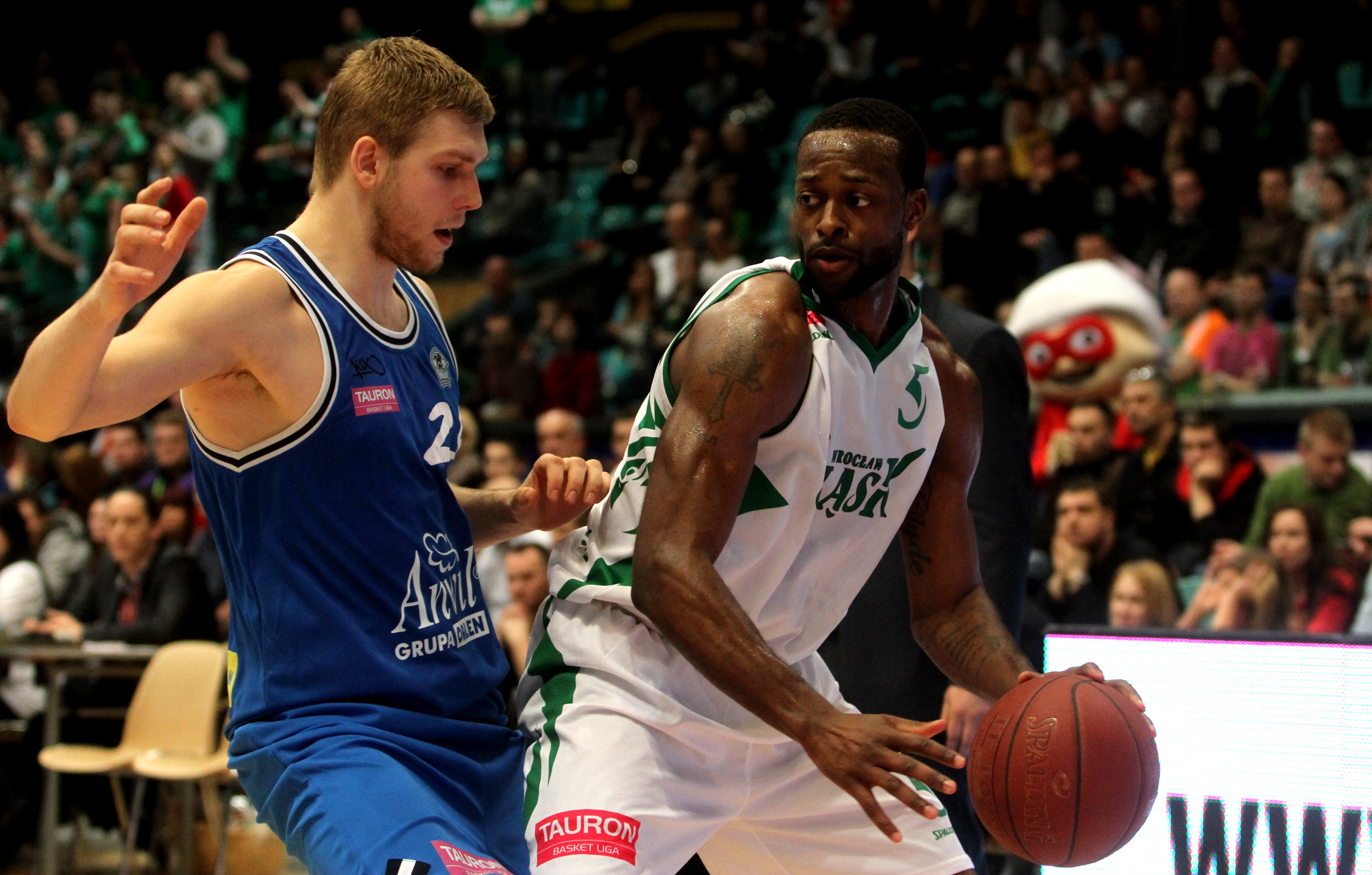
- Johnson (right) with Śląsk Wrocław

No. 5 – Al Ittihad Alexandria
- Position: Shooting guard
- League: Egyptian Basketball Super League

Personal information
- Born: June 9, 1987 (age 39)
- Listed height: 6 ft 4 in (1.93 m)
- Listed weight: 195 lb (88 kg)

Career information
- High school: Osborn (Detroit, Michigan)
- College: SW Tennessee CC (2006–2008); Azusa Pacific (2008–2010)
- NBA draft: 2010: undrafted
- Playing career: 2010–present

Career history
- 2010–2011: Idaho Stampede
- 2011–2012: Texas Legends
- 2012–2013: Santa Cruz Warriors
- 2013: Canton Charge
- 2013: Sioux Falls Skyforce
- 2013–2014: Śląsk Wrocław
- 2014–2015: Siarka Tarnobrzeg
- 2015: Maccabi Rishon LeZion
- 2015–2016: Banvit
- 2016: Alba Berlin
- 2016–2017: Varese
- 2017–2018: Reyer Venezia
- 2019: Sporting Al Riyadi Beirut
- 2019: Orléans Loiret Basket
- 2020–2021: APU Udine
- 2021: Fuerza Regia
- 2022: Dolomiti Energia Trento
- 2023–present: Al Ittihad Alexandria

Career highlights
- FIBA Europe Cup champion (2018); Polish League Top Scorer (2014); Polish Cup winner (2014); Lebanese Cup winner (2019); Lebanese Basketball League Winner (2019)

Dominique Johnson (born June 9, 1987) is an American professional basketball player who last played for Al Ittihad Alexandria.

== College career ==
Johnson played his college basketball at a Christian university, called Azusa Pacific University. He is among the rare players that play professional basketball, after coming from a NAIA college school.

== Professional career ==
On November 1, 2010, Johnson was selected in the third round (2010 Annual NBA Development League Draft) by the Idaho Stampede. On January 22, 2011, he joined the team of the Texas Legends, wearing the number 9, in whose colors he spent nearly two full seasons. For the 2011–12 season, Johnson was invited to the Minnesota Timberwolves training camp. He was later waived. In the beginning of the 2012–13 season, Johnson signed a non-guaranteed contract in the NBA, with the Sacramento Kings, for training camp. After being waived, on November 5, 2012, as part of a trade, he was sent to the Santa Cruz Warriors, but the team released him before the regular season competition. Four days later, he played with the Canton Charge. On March 19, 2013, he joined the NBA Development League team in Sioux Falls.

For the 2013–14 season, Johnson made his first trip to Europe, to play for the Polish club Slask Wroclaw, with which he won the Polish Cup title. In September 2014, he signed a contract with the Polish club Siarka Tarnobrzeg, and with them he led the Polish Tauron league in scoring, with 23 points per game, and three-point shooting (51.3%). Johnson ended the 2014–15 season with Maccabi Rishon LeZion

During the 2015–16 season, Johnson played for the Turkish Super League club Banvit BK. In the 2015–16 season, Johnson was 17th in scoring, and 6th in three-pointers made, in the European-wide 2nd-tier level EuroCup. He played with the German club Alba Berlin, in the 2016–17 basketball season.

On July 26, 2017, Johnson signed with Reyer Venezia, of the LBA. On May 2, 2018, Johnson won the European fourth-tier level FIBA Europe Cup championship with Reyer. On August 13, 2018, he inked with Pistoia Basket 2000.

In 2019, Dominique signed with Sporting Al Riyadi Beirut to join the Lebanese Basketball League or 'FLB League' or 'Alfa Lebanese Basketball League'. After his arrival, he won Dubai tournament cup and the Lebanese Cup in April 2019 and then the Lebanese Championship in May 2019.

On August 24, 2019, he has signed with Orléans Loiret Basket of the French Pro A. He signed with Pallalcesto Amatori Udine of the Serie A2 Basket on July 23, 2020. In 2021, Johnson played for Fuerza Regia of the Mexican league and averaged 12.9 points, 2.7 assists, and 1.8 rebounds per game.

On February 22, 2022, he has signed with Dolomiti Energia Trento of the Italian Lega Basket Serie A (LBA).

On May 25, 2022, Johnson was drafted by Killer 3's with the ninth overall pick of the 2022 BIG3 draft. In March 2023, Johnson joined Al Ittihad Alexandria in Egypt.
