= Stanley Burrell (basketball) =

American basketball player (born 1984)

Personal information
- Born: September 16, 1984 (age 42) Fort Knox, Kentucky, U.S.
- Listed height: 6 ft 3 in (1.91 m)
- Listed weight: 210 lb (95 kg)

Career information
- High school: Ben Davis (Indianapolis, Indiana)
- College: Xavier (2004–2008)
- NBA draft: 2008: undrafted
- Playing career: 2008–2016
- Position: Point guard

Career history
- 2008–2009: Bosna
- 2009: Austin Toros
- 2009–2010: Verviers-Pepinster
- 2010–2011: Generali Okapi Aalstar
- 2011–2012: Energa Czarni Słupsk
- 2012–2013: Eisbaeren Bremerhaven
- 2013: Royal Halı Gaziantep
- 2014: Bnei Herzliya
- 2014: Hitachi SunRockers
- 2014–2015: Tsmoki-Minsk
- 2015: Hapoel Gilboa Galil
- 2015: APOEL
- 2016: Szolnoki Olaj
- 2016: Energa Czarni Słupsk

Career highlights
- Atlantic 10 Defensive Player Of The Year (2008)

Stanley Dewayne Burrell Jr. (born September 16, 1984) is an American former professional basketball player. Standing at 6 feet 3 inches (1.91 m), he played the point guard position for 10 years professionally. Stanley Burrell was named a Hall of Fame basketball player, after he played college basketball for Xavier University (Cincinnati, OH). He was the starting guard for four seasons at Xavier and finished his career #12 on the All-Time scoring list (with 1,612 points). He also played in a school record 132 collegiate games.

== Early life ==
Burrell was born to Wonda and Stanley Burrell in Fort Knox, Kentucky. Burell's parents divorced at an early age, leaving him and his brother, James Burrell, to be raised by their mother in her hometown of Indianapolis, Indiana. In Indianapolis, Burrell attended Ben Davis High School, where he led the team in scoring as a senior with 20.9 points per game and guided them to a Sectional Championship and a Regional Runner-up finish to Pike High School in 2003. Burrell was named to the 2003 Indiana All-Star Team and also the Star West Player of the Year. After completing his high school training, he signed a National Letter of Intent to attend Xavier University.

== Prep-school season ==
After graduating from Ben Davis High School, Burrell did not go directly to Xavier University. Instead, he attended Hargrave Military Academy for the 2003–04 season. There he developed his game and body, so that he could have an immediate impact at Xavier. Burrell averaged 15.5 points per game and won the Prep-school National Championship.

== College career ==
Burrell arrived at Xavier University for his freshman season (2004–05) ready to contribute immediately. He led Xavier in scoring as a freshman with 12.7 points per game. Only the 3rd freshman player to ever accomplish that feat. He was named to the Atlantic 10 All-Rookie Team and also the All-Championship Team.

In his sophomore season (2005–06), Xavier won the Atlantic 10 Conference Tournament and earned a trip to the NCAA Tournament (but lost in the 1st round to Gonzaga). Burrell again led Xavier in scoring, with 14.4 points per game, and also assists, with 3.3 assists per game. He was named to the All Atlantic 10 Conference Team.

In his junior season (2006–07), Xavier won the Atlantic 10 regular season championship and earned another berth into the NCAA Tournament (but lost in the round of 32 vs. Ohio State University). Burrell was the team's 2nd leading scorer, with 12.4 points per game, and also 2nd in assists, with 2.4 assists per game. He was again named to the Atlantic 10 All Conference Team.

In his senior season (2007–08), Xavier won its 3rd consecutive Atlantic 10 Championship and earned another berth to the NCAA Tournament (advancing to the Elite Eight before losing to UCLA). Burrell became one of the nation's top defenders and was named the Atlantic 10 Defensive Player of the Year. He was still also contributing 9.7 points per game and 3.8 assists per game.

Burrell received national attention for his senior season defensive effort: Seth Davis (Sports Illustrated and CBS) named Burrell as the Captain of his ninth annual "All-Glue" Team an SI.com column. Burrell was named to the National All-Defensive First Team (rivals.com) and the National Defensive All-America Team (collegeinsider.com). ESPN analyst Jay Bilas had him among his six National Defensive Player of the Year candidates...

=== College career statistics ===
Year	GP-GS	Min	FG-A	Pct	3FG-A	Pct	FT-A	Pct	Rbs-Avg	PF	A TO S	Pts-Avg
2004–05	29–24	31.2	126–303	.416	61–166	.367	56–71	.789	94–3.2	74–60	63–22	369–12.7
2005–06	32–31	34.2	165–400	.413	69–172	.401	61–78	.782	94–2.9	56–105	73–23	460–14.4
2006–07	34–33	31.4	134–349	.384	61–171	.357	94–119	.790	68–2.0	51–83	62–24	423–12.4
2007–08	37–37	32.0	107–274	.391	44–112	.393	102–124	.823	81–2.2	56–140	84–28	360–9.7
Career	132–125	32.2	532–1326	.401	235–621	.378	313–392	.798	337–2.6	237–388	282–97	1612–12.2

(Statistics provided by GoXavier.com)

== Professional basketball career ==
After graduating from Xavier University with a Communications and Liberal Arts degree, Burrell attended the Portsmouth Invitational Tournament in Virginia (where he tied the record for most assists in one game: 13 assists) and the 2008 NBA Pre-Draft Camp in Florida.

Burrell signed his first professional basketball contract for 1 year with KK Bosna of the Adriatic League. Burrell averaged 9.7 points and 2.4 assists per game, in just 17 games played. Burrell left the team in January 2009 (due to the team's financial problems) and signed with the Austin Toros of the NBA's Developmental League for the remainder of the season.

Due to him arriving so late in the season, Burrell only played a reserve role for the Toros. He averaged 6.5 points and 2.0 assists per game. The Toros reached the semifinals of the D-League playoffs that season.

After attending free-agent camp with the NBA's Memphis Grizzlies in May 2009, Burrell signed his 2nd professional contract for 1 year with Royal Basket Club Verviers-Pepinster of the Basketball League Belgium (BLB). In 31 games, Burrell averaged 10.8 points per game and led the entire Belgian League in assists with 142 (4.6 apg).

At the end of the 2009–10 season with Pepinster, Burrell was signed to a 1-year deal by Generali Okapi Aalstar of the Basketball League Belgium (BLB).

In 2010, Burrell began his 3rd professional basketball season as point guard for Generali Okapi Aalstar.

In 2011, Burrell signed with Energa Czarni Slupsk of the Polish League, where he led the team in scoring at 15.6ppg and 4.6apg

In 2012, Burrell signed with Bremerhaven of the German League, where he led the team in scoring at 16.2pp and 4.3apg

On July 9, 2013, he signed with Royal Halı Gaziantep.

In January 2014, Burrell signed with Bnei Herzlyia of the Israeli League.

In 2014, Burrell signed with the Hitachi Sunrockers of the Japanese League.

On December 15, 2014, he signed with Tsmoki-Minsk of the Belarusian Premier League. On February 17, 2015, he left Minsk (For a team financial crisis that resulted in late payments to all players) and signed with Hapoel Gilboa Galil of the Israeli League.

In 2015, Burrell signed with Apoel of the Cyprus League.... In January 2016, he then moved to a Eurocup Team, Olaj Szolnok, of the Hungarian League.... He averaged 15.2ppg and 4.4apg in the Eurocup.

On July 27, 2016, Burrel signed with Polish club Energa Czarni Słupsk. He left the club after appearing in three games.
