= Tekele Cotton =

American basketball player (born 1993)

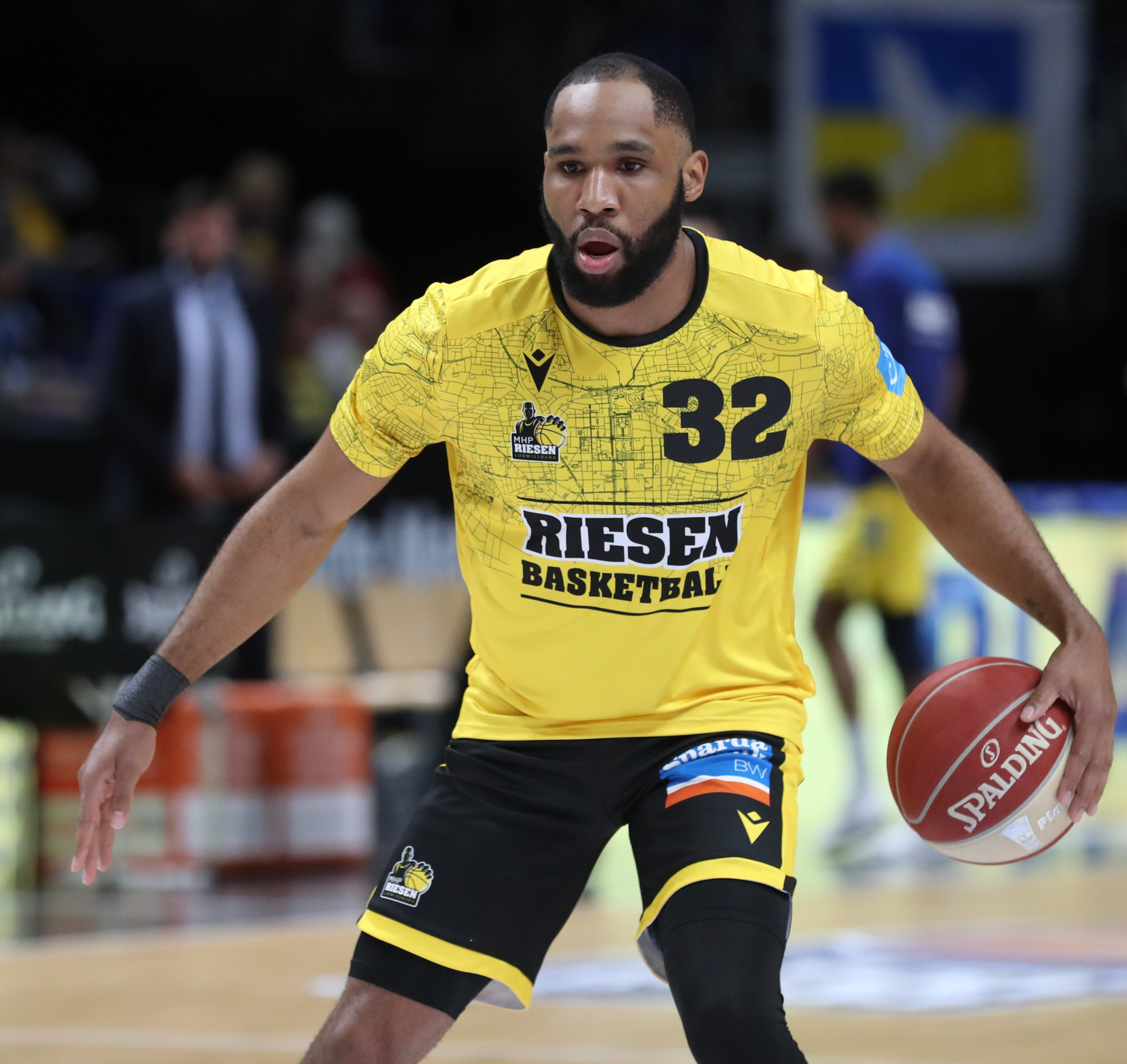
- Cotton in May 2022 while with Riesen Ludwigsburg

No. 32 – Lobos de Puebla
- Position: Point guard / shooting guard
- League: LNBP

Personal information
- Born: May 27, 1993 (age 33)
- Listed height: 188 cm (6 ft 2 in)
- Listed weight: 92 kg (203 lb)

Career information
- High school: Whitefield Academy (Marietta, Georgia)
- College: Wichita State (2011–2015)
- NBA draft: 2015: undrafted
- Playing career: 2015–present

Career history
- 2015–2017: Riesen Ludwigsburg
- 2018–2019: Fiat Torino
- 2020: BC Kalev
- 2020–2022: Benedetto XIV Cento
- 2022: Riesen Ludwigsburg
- 2022–2023: CSO Voluntari
- 2023–2024: Ferraroni Juve Cremona
- 2024: M Basket Mažeikiai
- 2024–2025: Trepça
- 2025–2026: BC Vienna
- 2026–present: Lobos de Puebla

Career highlights
- Kosovo Superleague champion (2025); Kosovo Cup winner (2025); 2× MVC Defensive Player of the Year (2014, 2015); 2× Second-team All-MVC (2014, 2015)

Tekele Mozet Cotton (born May 27, 1993) is an American professional basketball player for GGMT Vienna of the Austrian Basketball Superliga.

== Professional career ==
On September 2, 2015, Cotton signed with the German club Riesen Ludwigsburg.

On July 17, 2018, Cotton signed a deal with the Italian club Fiat Torino for the 2018–19 LBA season.

In 2020, Cotton spent three games with Kalev/Cramo of the Latvian–Estonian League before the season was terminated. On August 8, 2020, he signed with Benedetto XIV Cento of the Serie A2. Cotton averaged 14 points and 3 assists per game.

On February 7, 2022, he has signed with MHP Riesen Ludwigsburg of the Basketball Bundesliga (BBL).

On August 5, 2022, he has signed with CSO Voluntari of the Liga Națională.

On December 20, 2024, he has signed with Trepça of the Kosovo Superleague.

On August 26, 2025, he signed with GGMT Vienna of the Austrian Basketball Superliga.
