= Will Daniels =

American basketball player (born 1986)

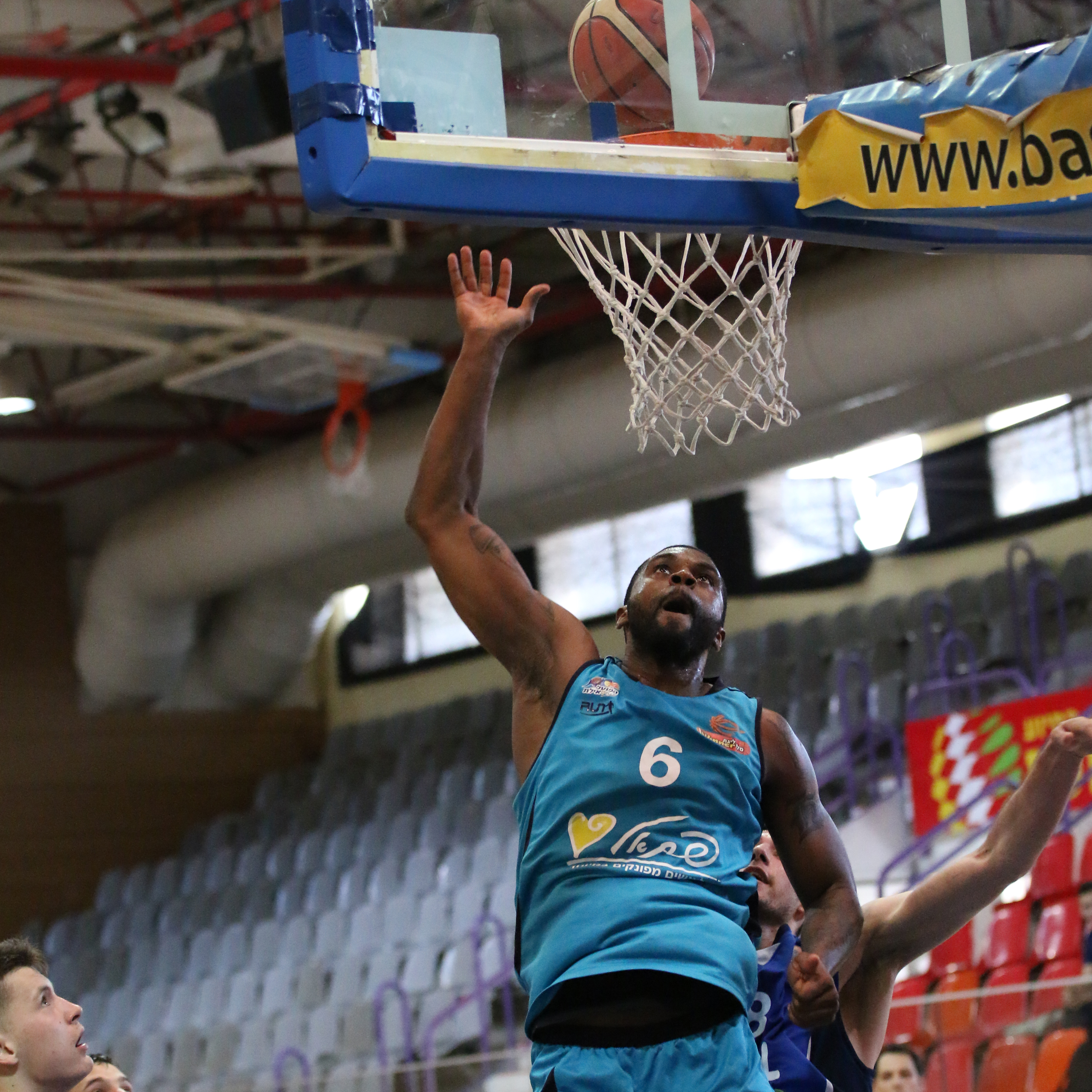

Real Estelí
- Position: Small forward / power forward
- League: LSB

Personal information
- Born: April 21, 1986 (age 40) Poughkeepsie, New York
- Listed height: 6 ft 8 in (2.03 m)
- Listed weight: 230 lb (104 kg)

Career information
- High school: Franklin Delano Roosevelt (Hyde Park, New York)
- College: Rhode Island (2004–2008)
- NBA draft: 2008: undrafted
- Playing career: 2008–present

Career history
- 2008–2009: Kavala
- 2009: Peristeri
- 2009–2010: Bakersfield Jam
- 2010–2012: JSF Nanterre
- 2012–2013: VEF Rīga
- 2013–2014: JSF Nanterre
- 2014: Nizhny Novgorod
- 2015: Mets de Guaynabo
- 2015–2016: Limoges CSP
- 2016–2017: Al Mouttahed Tripoli
- 2017: Hapoel Eilat
- 2017: Piratas de Quebradillas
- 2017–2018: Selçuklu Belediyesi
- 2018: Cariduros de Fajardo
- 2018–2019: Levallois Metropolitans
- 2019: Leones de Ponce
- 2019: Soles de Mexicali
- 2019–2020: Brujos de Guayama
- 2020: Eisbären Bremerhaven
- 2021–2022: Fethiye Belediyespor
- 2022–2023: Atléticos de San Germán
- 2022–2023: Nacional
- 2023: Trepça
- 2023: Dorados de Chihuahua
- 2024: Bashkimi
- 2024: Pioneros
- 2024–present: Real Estelí

Career highlights
- Kosovo Cup winner (2023); Mexican League champion (2020); Turkish First League scoring champion (2018); Puerto Rican League champion (2017); French Cup winner (2014); Latvian League champion (2013); Greek League All Star Slam Dunk winner (2009); 2× First-team All-Atlantic 10 (2007, 2008)

Will Daniels (born April 21, 1986) is an American professional basketball player for Real Estelí of the LSB. He played college basketball for Rhode Island.

== Playing career ==
After playing four years (2004–2008) of college basketball at the University of Rhode Island, Will was undrafted in the 2008 NBA draft.

In 2008–09, he played with the Kavala B.C. in the Greek Basket League. He then started next season with another Greek team Peristeri B.C., but few months later moved to Bakersfield Jam of the NBA D-League.

After playing in D-League, Daniels returned overseas joining JSF Nanterre, where he spent next two seasons.

In June 2012, Daniels signed with Latvian team VEF Rīga. After a successful season in Latvia, Will moved back to JSF Nanterre, where he made his Euroleague debut.

In September 2014, he signed a one-year deal with Nizhny Novgorod of Russia. On November 14, 2014, he parted ways with Nizhny. In March 2015, he signed with Mets de Guaynabo of Puerto Rico for the 2015 BSN season.

On August 29, 2015, he signed with Limoges CSP for the 2015–16 season.

In November 2016, he signed with Al Mouttahed Tripoli.

In January 2017, he signed with Hapoel Eilat.

In June 2017, he signed with Piratas de Quebradillas.

On February 16, 2019, he signed with Levallois Metropolitans of French LNB Pro A.

On May 20, 2021, Daniels returned to Piratas de Quebradillas. On October 21, Daniels signed with Fethiye Belediyespor of the Turkish Basketball First League.

As of 2022, he was playing for Club Nacional of the Liga Uruguaya de Básquetbol.

On 10 January 2023, Daniels signed for Trepça of the Kosovo Basketball Superleague. He made his debut against Sigal Prishtina scoring 10 points and catching 3 rebounds. Daniels helped Trepça to win the Kosovo Cup in the final against Prishtina.

== EuroLeague career statistics ==
Legend
| GP | Games played | GS | Games started | MPG | Minutes per game |
| FG% | Field-goal percentage | 3P% | 3-point field-goal percentage | FT% | Free-throw percentage |
| RPG | Rebounds per game | APG | Assists per game | SPG | Steals per game |
| BPG | Blocks per game | PPG | Points per game | PIR | Performance index rating |
| **Bold** | Career high |

| Year | Team | GP | GS | MPG | FG% | 3P% | FT% | RPG | APG | SPG | BPG | PPG | PIR |
|---|---|---|---|---|---|---|---|---|---|---|---|---|---|
| 2013–14 | Nanterre | 10 | 10 | 21.2 | .448 | .385 | .655 | 4.7 | .7 | .6 | .5 | 11.5 | 10.2 |
| Career | | 10 | 10 | 21.2 | .448 | .385 | .655 | 4.7 | .7 | .6 | .5 | 11.5 | 10.2 |
