= Travis Peterson =

American basketball player (born 1985)

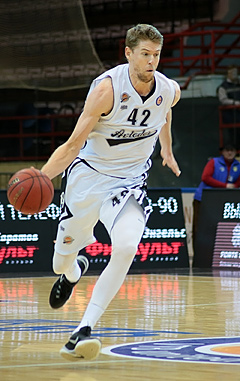
- Peterson with Avtodor Saratov in 2016

Personal information
- Born: May 18, 1985 (age 41) Glendale, Arizona, U.S.
- Listed height: 6 ft 10 in (2.08 m)
- Listed weight: 225 lb (102 kg)

Career information
- High school: Mountain Ridge (Glendale, Arizona)
- College: Samford (2004–2008)
- NBA draft: 2008: undrafted
- Playing career: 2008–2018
- Position: Power forward / center
- Number: 42

Career history
- 2008–2010: Rilski Sportist
- 2010–2011: Lukoil Academic
- 2011–2012: Prostějov
- 2012–2014: Goverla
- 2014: Rio Natura Monbus
- 2014–2016: Avtodor Saratov
- 2016: Valencia Basket
- 2016–2017: Hapoel Jerusalem
- 2017–2018: Lietuvos rytas

Career highlights
- Israeli Super League champion (2017); Israeli League Cup winner (2016); Bulgarian League champion (2011); Bulgarian Cup winner (2011); Balkan League champion (2009)

Travis James Peterson (born May 18, 1985) is an American former professional basketball player who last played for Lietuvos rytas of the Lithuanian League. The 6 foot 10 inch tall center/power forward is a former NCAA Division 1 collegiate athlete. He played five seasons (2003–2008) at Samford University under head coach, Jimmy Tillette, mostly playing the center position. He graduated from Samford in 2008. He attended Mountain Ridge High School in Glendale, Arizona which is where he was born and raised.

== High school career ==
Born in Glendale, Arizona, Peterson averaged 16 points and 10 rebounds per game under head coach Drew Tutt at Mountain Ridge High School. He began his career playing the point guard position until he underwent a six-inch growth spurt late in his career. He shot 55 percent from the floor and 80 percent from the charity stripe throughout his prep career. He was awarded All-State Team member and First-Team All-Northwest Region as well as the MVP of the Region as a senior and was selected to play in the Arizona Prep Showcase that featured the top-40 high school players in the state.

== College career ==
Peterson earned a full athletic scholarship to play basketball at Samford University under head coach Jimmy Tillette. As a sophomore (2005–06), Peterson averaged 29 minutes per game and finished 3rd on the team in 3-point percentage at .409. He was named to the 2009 OVC All-Tournament Team. He also led the OVC in assist/turnover ratio (2.88) and was ranked fourth in the conference in blocks per game with 1.1. He averaged 11.2 points, 3.8 rebounds and 3.2 assists per game. His Junior season (2006–07) he led his team in rebounds with 159 at an average of 5.0 per game. He was named to the Preseason All-Ohio Valley Conference team. He averaged 32.4 minutes per game and 11.3 points per game that season. He also had 78 assists and a team-high 36 blocks. He was ranked second in the OVC in blocks with 1.1 per game. He averaged 12.2 points and 4.9 rebounds during OVC play. He ended this season as Samford's career leader in points (723), rebounds (286), and assists (179). He was also named to the OVC All-Tournament team.

== Professional career ==
Peterson entered his rookie season in 2008 with Rilski Sportist who plays in the International Balkan League as well as the Bulgarian National League. He was awarded Most Valuable Player of the Balkan League in 2009 and was listed on Eurobasket.com as the Balkan League Import player of the year, Center of the year and Player of the year. He also led Rilski to the 2009 Balkan League Championship. He played with Rilski Sportist for two consecutive seasons (2008–2010), where he continued to dominate the league as the leading rebounder and finished 3rd in scoring. He was awarded MVP of the Balkan league for the second season in a row and led his team to a 2nd-place finish for the National Cup.

For the 2010–11 season he signed with Lukoil Academic, who was a EuroCup qualifying team. They competed in the EuroChallenge finishing in the top 8 in 2011. They were also National Bulgarian Champions and Bulgarian National Cup Champions this year. Peterson signed with Prostějov in the Czech Republic for the 2011–12 season. He was selected for the Czech All-Star team in 2012 and helped his team to a 2nd-place finish in the Czech league. Peterson played for BC Hoverla in Ivanov-Frankovsk, Ukraine, until 2014, when he signed for Spanish team Río Natura Monbús.

In May 2016, he signed with Valencia Basket for the playoffs.

In July 2016, he signed a one-year deal with Hapoel Jerusalem of the Israeli Premier League. Peterson helped Jerusalem to win the Israeli League and League Cup titles, as well as reaching the EuroCup semifinals.

On July 20, 2017, Peterson signed with Lithuanian club Lietuvos rytas for the 2017–18 season. In 46 LKL games played for rytas, Peterson averaged 10.2 points and 4.4 rebounds, shooting 40.7 percent from 3-point range.

On September 29, 2018, Peterson announced his retirement from basketball.

== Personal life ==
Travis graduated from Samford University with a degree in Economics and Business management. In June 2009, he married his wife, Jackie Peterson. They reside in Peoria, Arizona.
