= Soner Şentürk =

Turkish basketball player (born 1986)

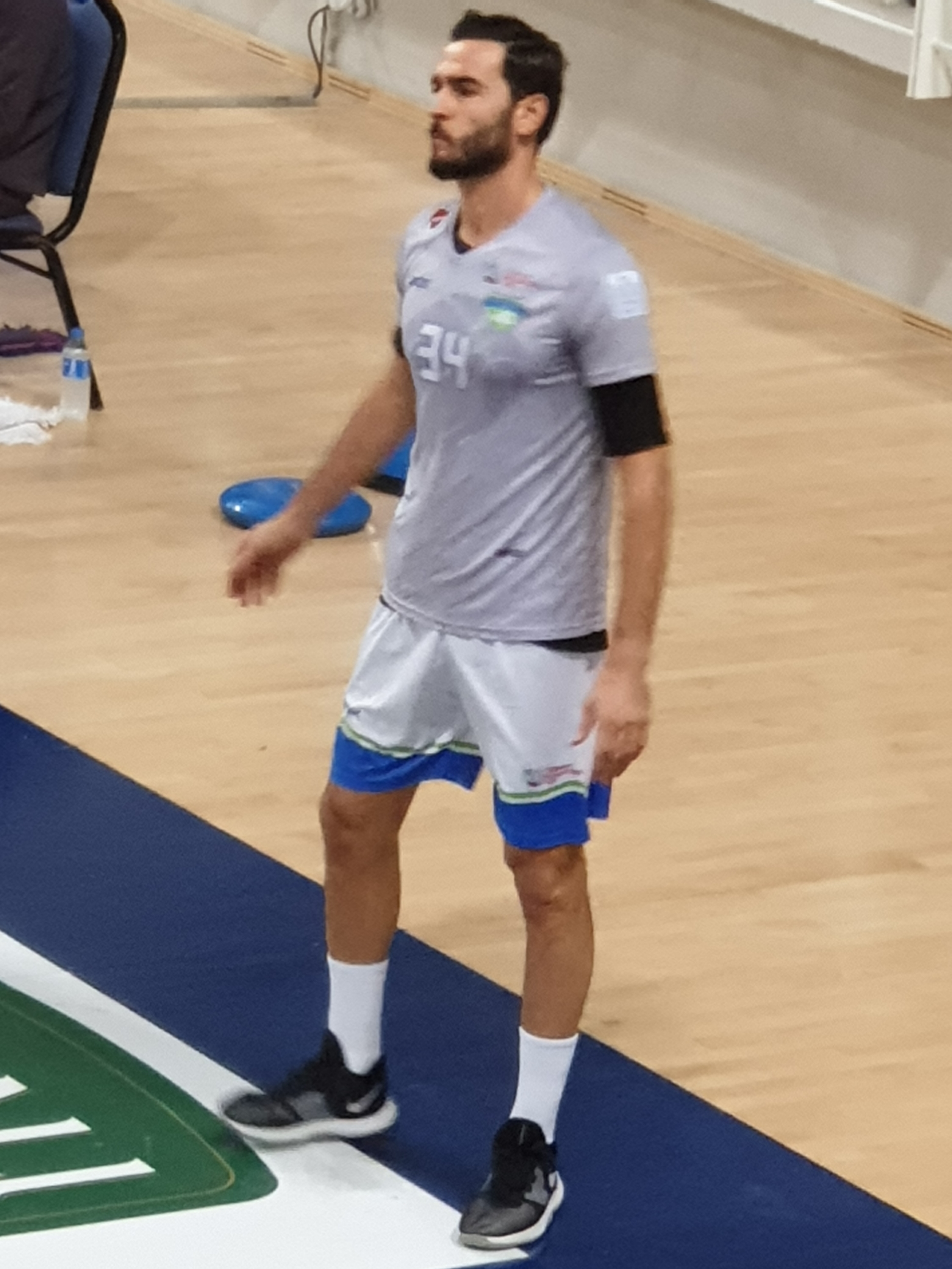

Personal information
- Born: August 7, 1986 (age 40) Bakırköy, Istanbul, Turkey
- Listed height: 6 ft 4 in (1.93 m)
- Listed weight: 201 lb (91 kg)

Career information
- Playing career: 2002–2025
- Position: Point guard

Career history
- 2002–2009: Darüşşafaka
- 2009–2010: Türk Telekom
- 2010–2011: Bornova Belediye
- 2011–2012: Erdemir
- 2012–2017: Pınar Karşıyaka
- 2017–2018: Bahçeşehir Koleji
- 2019: Karesi Spor
- 2019–2020: Merkezefendi Denizli
- 2021: ABB Ego Spor
- 2022: Çağdaş Bodrumspor
- 2022–2023: Bornova Belediyesi Karşıyaka
- 2023–2025: MKE Ankaragücü

Career highlights
- Turkish League champion (2015)

Soner Şentürk (born August 7, 1986) is a Turkish former professional basketball player who played as a point guard.
