= PalaBigi =

Coordinates: 44°41′56″N 10°37′29″E

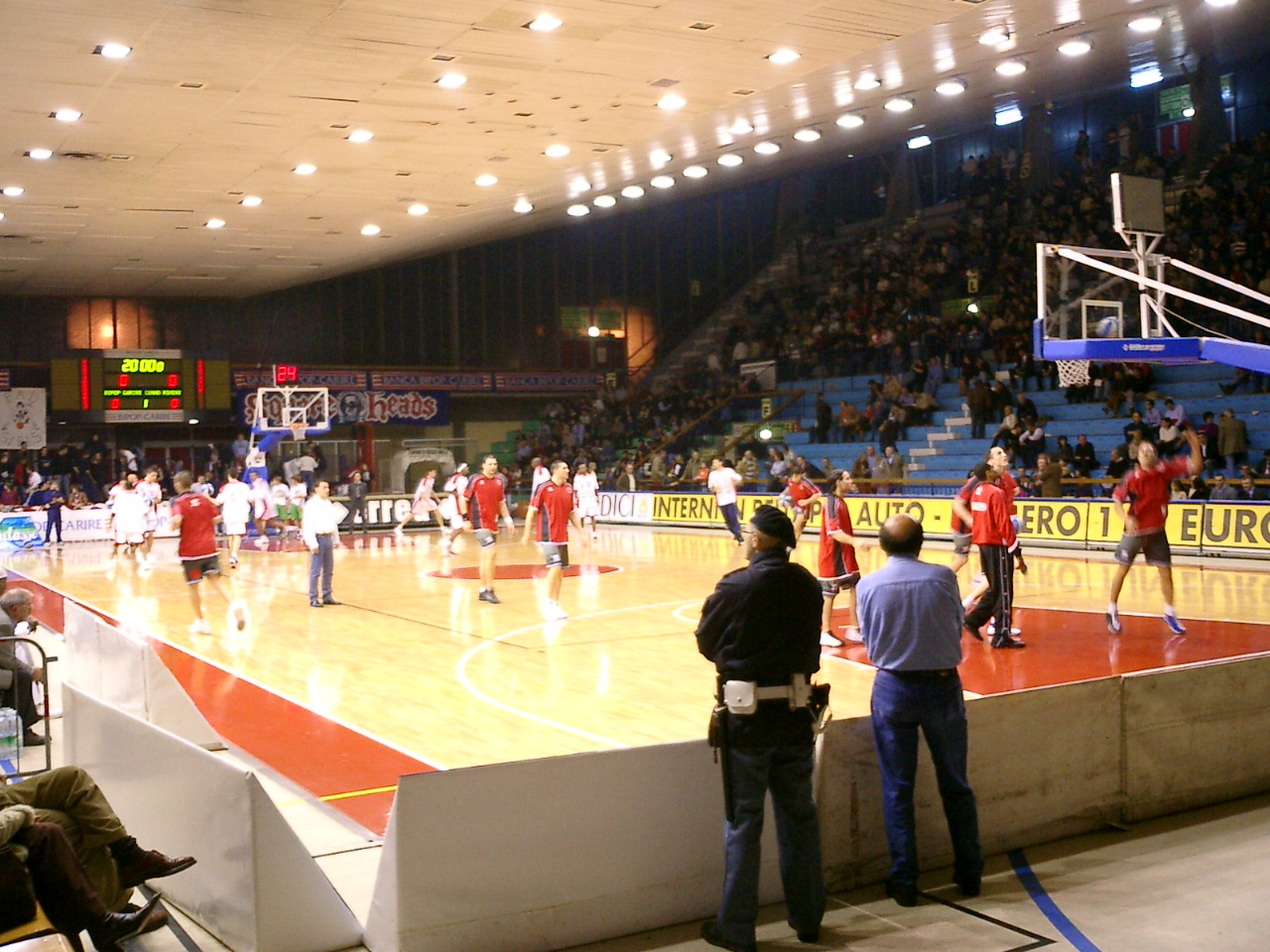
- Interactive map of PalaBigi
- Full name: Palazzo dello Sport "Giulio Bigi"
- Former names: Palasport
- Location: Via Guasco n.8, Reggio Emilia, Italy
- Capacity: 4,545
- Surface: Parquet

Construction
- Groundbreaking: 1967
- Opened: 1968
- Renovated: 2007, 2016, 2017
- Expanded: 2016, 2017

Tenants
- Pallacanestro Reggiana (1980–present); Volley Tricolore (2012–present); Kaos Reggio Emilia (2017-present)

PalaBigi (formerly known as Palasport) is an indoor arena that is located in Reggio Emilia, Italy. The arena is dedicated to the late "Assessore allo Sport" (the sport delegate of the Municipality) Giulio Bigi. The seating capacity of the arena is 4,600 people. It has a seating capacity of 4,550 seats reserved to local fans, and a section of 50 seats reserved for the away fans.

The arena was opened in 1968. It is home to Pallacanestro Reggiana basketball team, and Volley Tricolore volleyball team.

== History ==
The construction of the arena started during the late 1960s, thanks to the efforts of municipal delegate Giulio Bigi, who wanted to build a big sports arena in the city, due to the large interest in sports. La Torre volleyball and basketball teams were competing in the First Divisions, with the female volleyball section winning four consecutive national championships, between 1964 and 1968, in the old small sports gym "GIL".

PalaBigi was completed in December 1967, with the first competitive game held in it in 1968. The original capacity was near to 5,000, due to the terraces conformation of the stands in the 1960s and in the 1970s, and it was only later reduced to 3,000 because of the new arena laws introduced by the Italian Parliament.

PalaBigi hosted the senior men's Italian national basketball team in 1999, where the Azzurri beat France, and the Italian national men's volleyball team the same year, where they beat Russia, 3–2. The arena has also hosted various concerts of Italian artists, like the local born Luciano Ligabue. In 2012, the capacity of the arena was increased to 3,500.

In 2016, a plan to upgrade to the capacity to 4,600 was approved by the local municipality, with the construction work starting in the summer. In the same year, a public initiative, called "La Nostra Storia nel PalaBigi" (Our History in PalaBigi), was started by a local young fan, who aimed to dedicate the new sections of the arena, to the great former players of the club that marked the history of the arena; and to create a museum of its sports history, in order to preserve the arena's original identity, despite the new reconstruction.

The initiative saw more than 300 people signing on to the popular petition, which addressed the Municipality of Reggio Emilia.
