= 2015–16 FC Barcelona Bàsquet season =

Spanish basketball club season

FC Barcelona
2015–16 season
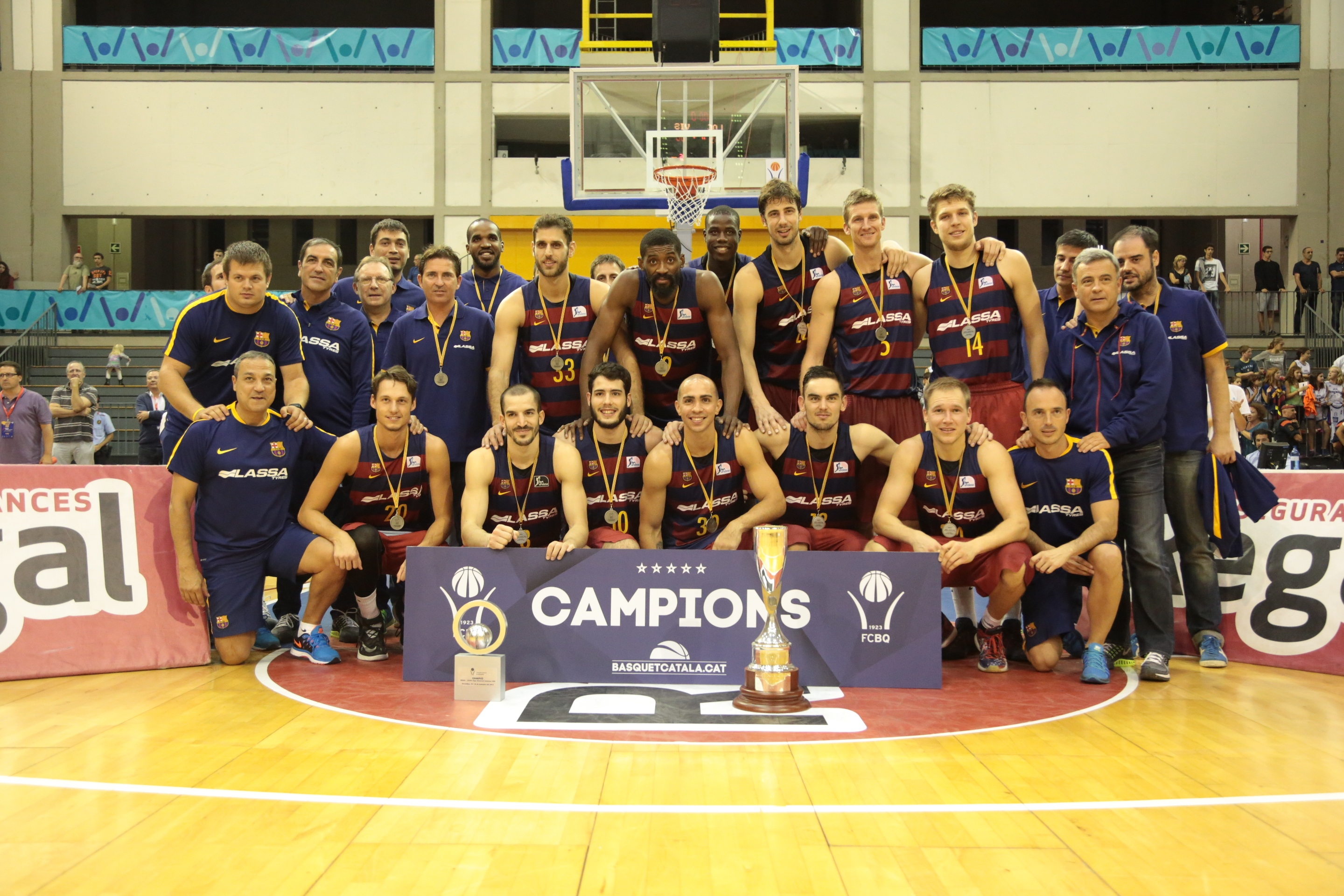
- Barcelona roster in September 2015
- Chairman: Josep Maria Bartomeu
- Head coach: Xavier Pascual
- Arena: Palau Blaugrana
- Liga ACB: 1st
- Playoffs: Runners-up
- Copa del Rey: Quarterfinalists
- Supercopa de España: Winners
- Euroleague: Playoffs
- Highest home attendance: 7,142 vs Real Madrid (17 March 2016)
- Average home attendance: 6,083 (in EuroLeague); 5,074 (in Liga ACB)
- Biggest win: 108–54 vs Baloncesto Sevilla (14 February 2016)
- Biggest defeat: 70–90 vs Real Madrid (17 June 2016)
Home	Away

The 2015–16 season was FC Barcelona Lassa's 90th in existence and the club's 33rd consecutive season in the top flight of Spanish basketball. Barcelona was involved in four competitions.

== Players ==
=== Squad information ===
FC Barcelona Lassa roster
Players
Coaches

Pos.	No.	Nat.	Name	Ht.	Wt.	Age
G/F	10	(Spain)	Abrines, Álex	1.98 m (6 ft 6 in)	86 kg (190 lb)	22 – 1 August 1993
PG	30	(Puerto Rico)	Arroyo, Carlos	1.88 m (6 ft 2 in)	84 kg (185 lb)	36 – 30 July 1979
C	21	(Senegal)	Diagne, Moussa	2.11 m (6 ft 11 in)	103 kg (227 lb)	22 – 6 March 1994
PF	5	(United States)	Doellman, Justin	2.08 m (6 ft 10 in)	102 kg (225 lb)	31 – 3 February 1985
C	6	(United States)	Dorsey, Joey	2.03 m (6 ft 8 in)	129 kg (284 lb)	32 – 16 December 1983
G/F	20	(Sweden)	Eriksson, Marcus	2.00 m (6 ft 7 in)	89 kg (196 lb)	22 – 5 December 1993
C	9	(Nigeria)	Lawal, Shane	2.08 m (6 ft 10 in)	105 kg (231 lb)	29 – 8 October 1986
SG	11	(Spain)	Navarro, Juan Carlos (C)	1.92 m (6 ft 4 in)	90.5 kg (200 lb)	36 – 13 June 1980
SG	24	(United States)	Oleson, Brad	1.91 m (6 ft 3 in)	90.5 kg (200 lb)	33 – 11 April 1983
SF	33	(Greece)	Perperoglou, Stratos	2.03 m (6 ft 8 in)	104 kg (229 lb)	31 – 7 August 1984
SG	8	(Spain)	Ribas, Pau	1.96 m (6 ft 5 in)	95 kg (209 lb)	29 – 2 March 1987
F/C	23	(Jamaica)	Samuels, Samardo	2.06 m (6 ft 9 in)	118 kg (260 lb)	27 – 9 January 1989
PG	13	(Czech Republic)	Satoranský, Tomáš	1.99 m (6 ft 6 in)	86 kg (190 lb)	24 – 30 October 1991
C	44	(Croatia)	Tomić, Ante	2.18 m (7 ft 2 in)	120 kg (265 lb)	29 – 17 February 1987
F	14	(Bulgaria)	Vezenkov, Aleksandar	2.06 m (6 ft 9 in)	102 kg (225 lb)	20 – 6 August 1995

Head coach

- (Spain) Xavier Pascual

Assistant coach(es)

- (Spain) Iñigo Zorzano
- (Spain) David García
- (Spain) Oriol Pagès

Legend

- (C) Team captain
- Injured

- Roster

=== Players in ===
No.	Pos.	Nat.	Name	Age	Moving from		Type	Ends	Transfer fee	Date	Source
9	F/C	(Nigeria)	Shane Lawal	28	Banco di Sardegna Sassari	(Italy)	Expired contract	2 years	Free	July 20, 2015	
21	C	(Senegal)	Moussa Diagne	21	Montakit Fuenlabrada	(Spain)	Transfer	3 years	–	July 21, 2015	
23	F/C	(Jamaica)	Samardo Samuels	26	EA7 Emporio Armani Milan	(Italy)	Expired contract	2 years	Free	July 22, 2015	
33	SF	(Greece)	Stratos Perperoglou	30	Anadolu Efes	(Turkey)	Expired contract	2 years	Free	July 23, 2015	
8	G	(Spain)	Pau Ribas	28	Valencia Basket	(Spain)	Transfer	3 years	–	July 24, 2015	
30	PG	(Puerto Rico)	Carlos Arroyo	35	Cangrejeros de Santurce	(Puerto Rico)	Expired contract	1 year	Free	July 24, 2015	
14	PF	(Bulgaria)	Aleksandar Vezenkov	20	Aris Thessaloniki	(Greece)	Transfer	4 years	€315,000	July 31, 2015	
6	C	(United States)	Joey Dorsey	32	Galatasaray Odeabank	(Turkey)	Transfer	1 year	–	February 19, 2016	

Total spending: ▼€315,000

=== Players out ===
No.	Pos.	Nat.	Name	Age	Moving to		Type	Transfer fee	Date	Source
8	SF	(Croatia)	Mario Hezonja	20	Orlando Magic	(United States)	Transfer	–	June 29, 2015	
25	SG	(France)	Edwin Jackson	25	Unicaja	(Spain)	Expired contract	Free	July 8, 2015	
34	F	(Slovenia)	Bostjan Nachbar	35	Baloncesto Sevilla	(Spain)	Expired contract	Free	July 14, 2015	
21	C	(Germany)	Tibor Pleiß	25	Utah Jazz	(United States)	Transfer	–	July 14, 2015	
14	F/C	(Montenegro)	Marko Todorović	23	Khimki	(Russia)	Expired contract	Free	July 14, 2015	
9	PG	(Brazil)	Marcelinho Huertas	32	Los Angeles Lakers	(United States)	Expired contract	Free	August 12, 2015	
30	F/C	(Poland)	Maciej Lampe	30	Beşiktaş	(Turkey)	Expired contract	Free	August 28, 2015	
23	SF	(United States)	Deshaun Thomas	23	San Antonio Spurs	(United States)	Expired contract	Free	September 28, 2015	

Total income: ▲€0

Total expenditure:▼€315,000

== Club ==
=== Technical staff ===
Position	Staff
Head coach	Xavi Pascual
Assistant coaches	Iñigo Zorzano; David García; Oriol Pagès
Athletic trainer	Mariano Hontecillas
Team doctor	Gil Rodas
Delegate	Xavier Montolio
Physiotherapists	Toni Bové; Francesc Guilanyà
Equipment manager	Miquel Font

Source: FC Barcelona Lassa

=== Kit ===
Supplier: Nike / Sponsor: Lassa Tyres

Home	Away

== Pre-season and friendlies ==
Win Loss

6 September 2015 1	FC Barcelona Lassa	86–77	FIATC Joventut	Sant Julià de Vilatorta
12:30 (CEST)	Scoring by quarter: 18–23, 28–23, 21–14, 19–17
	Pts: García 20; Rebs: Diagne, Samuels 3 Asts: Oleson 4 PIR: Samuels 26	Boxscore	Pts: Mallet 20; Rebs: Drame 8 Asts: Ventura 3 PIR: Abalde 16	Arena: Pavelló Sant Julia; Referees: Guirao, Cardús, Mas

12 September 2015 2	MoraBanc Andorra	73–81	FC Barcelona Lassa	Andorra la Vella
21:00 (CEST)	Scoring by quarter: 17–19, 22–20, 18–23, 16–19
	Pts: Bogdanović 15; Rebs: Navarro 9 Asts: Navarro 7 PIR: Navarro 16	Boxscore	Pts: Doellman 17; Rebs: Lawal 9 Asts: Arroyo 5 PIR: Doellman 19	Arena: Poliesportiu d'Andorra; Referees: Martín Bertrán, Munar, Mas

20 September 2015 3	Montakit Fuenlabrada	65–76	FC Barcelona Lassa	Fuenlabrada
18:00 (CEST)	Scoring by quarter: 15–21, 15–19, 13–21, 22–15
	Pts: Wear 16; Rebs: Wear 5 Asts: Paunić 5 PIR: Wear 16	Boxscore	Pts: Eriksson 16; Rebs: Tomić 5 Asts: Arroyo 5 PIR: Doellman 17	Arena: Fernando Martín; Attendance: 1,125; Referees: Sánchez Montserrat, Caballero, Zamorano

26 September 2015 4	FC Barcelona Lassa	78–65	ICL Manresa	Granollers
21:00 (CEST)	Scoring by quarter: 25–17, 17–20, 9–17, 27–11
	Pts: Abrines 16; Rebs: Abrines, Tomić 6 Asts: Arroyo 5 PIR: Abrines 19	Boxscore	Pts: Simon 12; Rebs: Musli 7 Asts: four players 2 PIR: Musli 12	Arena: Palau d'Esports de Granollers; Attendance: 2,500; Referees: Guirao, Oyón, Cardús

27 September 2015 5	MoraBanc Andorra	65–68	FC Barcelona Lassa	Granollers
20:30 (CEST)	Scoring by quarter: 16–14, 18–9, 19–17, 12–28
	Pts: Stojanovski 12; Rebs: Jones 10; Asts: three players 2 PIR: Jones 18	Boxscore	Pts: Ribas 26; Rebs: Tomić 9 Asts: Ribas, Satoranský 3 PIR: Ribas 30	Arena: Palau d'Esports de Granollers; Attendance: 2,480; Referees: Guirao, Oyón, Aliaga

== Competitions ==
=== Overall ===
Competition	Started round	Final position / round	First match	Last match
Liga ACB	Matchday 1	1st	11 October 2015	22 May 2016
ACB Playoffs	Quarterfinals	Runners-up	26 May 2016	22 June 2016
Copa del Rey	Quarterfinals	Quarterfinalists	18 February 2016	
Supercopa de España	Semifinals	Winners	2 October 2015	3 October 2015
Euroleague	Regular season	Playoffs	15 October 2015	26 April 2016

Updated to match played June 22, 2016
Source: Competitions

=== Overview ===
Competition	Record							
Competition	Pld	W	D	L	PF	PA	PD	Win %
Liga ACB	34	29	0	5	2,835	2,384	+451	85.29
ACB Playoffs	10	6	0	4	836	790	+46	60.00
Copa del Rey	1	0	0	1	72	73	−1	0.00
Supercopa de España	2	2	0	0	168	122	+46	100.00
Euroleague	29	16	0	13	2,289	2,181	+108	55.17
Total	76	53	0	23	6,200	5,550	+650	69.74

Last updated: June 22, 2016
Source: Competitions

=== Supercopa de España ===
Win Loss

2 October 2015 Semifinals	Herbalife Gran Canaria	60–88	FC Barcelona Lassa	Málaga
19:00 (CEST)	Scoring by quarter: 13–16, 19–25, 15–30, 13–17
	Pts: Pangos 13; Rebs: four players 4 Asts: Pangos 6 PIR: Savané 14	Boxscore	Pts: Eriksson 16; Rebs: three players 5 Asts: Satoranský 8 PIR: Eriksson 19	Arena: Martín Carpena; Referees: García González, Conde, Peruga

3 October 2015 Finals	Unicaja	62–80	FC Barcelona Lassa	Málaga
19:00 (CEST)	Scoring by quarter: 15–22, 16–15, 12–20, 19–23
	Pts: Kuzminskas 12; Rebs: Thomas 6 Asts: Marković 3 PIR: three players 10	Boxscore	Pts: Ribas 15; Rebs: Lawal 8 Asts: Arroyo 6 PIR: Ribas 25	Arena: Martín Carpena; Attendance: 10,310; Referees: García González, Pérez Pérez, Peruga

=== Liga ACB ===
==== League table ====
Pos	Team	Pld	W	L	PF	PA	PD	Qualification or relegation
1	FC Barcelona Lassa	34	29	5	2835	2384	+451	Qualification to playoffs
2	Real Madrid	34	29	5	3229	2767	+462	Qualification to playoffs
3	Valencia Basket	34	28	6	2831	2501	+330	Qualification to playoffs
4	Laboral Kutxa Baskonia	34	24	10	2987	2703	+284	Qualification to playoffs
5	Herbalife Gran Canaria	34	21	13	2818	2705	+113	Qualification to playoffs

Source: ACB

==== Results summary ====
Overall						Home					Away				
Pld	W	L	PF	PA	PD	W	L	PF	PA	PD	W	L	PF	PA	PD
34	29	5	2835	2384	+451	15	2	1442	1181	+261	14	3	1393	1203	+190

Last updated: May 22, 2016.
Source: Competitive matches

==== Results by round ====
Round	1	2	3	4	5	6	7	8	9	10	11	12	13	14	15	16	17	18	19	20	21	22	23	24	25	26	27	28	29	30	31	32	33	34
Ground	H	A	A	H	A	H	A	H	A	A	H	H	A	H	A	A	H	A	H	H	A	H	A	H	A	H	A	H	H	A	A	H	A	H
Result	W	W	W	W	W	W	L	W	W	W	W	W	W	W	W	W	L	W	W	W	W	W	W	W	W	W	W	W	L	W	L	W	L	W
Position	6	2	2	1	1	1	2	2	2	3	3	3	2	2	2	2	2	2	2	2	1	1	1	1	1	1	1	1	1	1	1	1	1	1

Updated to match(es) played on May 22, 2016. Source: Competitive matches
A = Away; H = Home; W = Win; D = Draw; L = Loss

==== Matches ====
Win Loss

11 October 2015 1	FC Barcelona Lassa	84–76	CAI Zaragoza	Barcelona
19:30 (CEST)	Scoring by quarter: 21–23, 24–23, 16–16, 23–14
	Pts: Tomić 23; Rebs: Doellman 7 Asts: three players 3 PIR: Tomić 34	Boxscore	Pts: Diener 11; Rebs: Fotu, Norel 4 Asts: Bellas, Kanacević 4 PIR: Fotu 14	Arena: Palau Blaugrana; Attendance: 6,149; Referees: Jiménez Trujillo, Sánchez Monserrat, Sacristán

18 October 2015 2	Baloncesto Sevilla	58–97	FC Barcelona Lassa	Sevilla
18:00 (CEST)	Scoring by quarter: 17–29, 8–22, 16–23, 17–23
	Pts: Bamforth, Miljenović 9 Rebs: Nachbar 5 Asts: Bamforth 4 PIR: Bamforth, Miljenović 11	Boxscore	Pts: Ribas 18; Rebs: Tomić 6 Asts: Abrines 4 PIR: Ribas 25	Arena: San Pablo; Attendance: 4,474; Referees: Martín Bertrán, Martínez, Martínez Díez

25 October 2015 3	UCAM Murcia	74–82	FC Barcelona Lassa	Murcia
13:00 (CET)	Scoring by quarter: 29–18, 14–18, 20–25, 11–21
	Pts: Antelo, Campazzo 15; Rebs: Lishchuk 6 Asts: Campazzo 4 PIR: Campazzo 21	Boxscore	Pts: Tomić 17; Rebs: Abrines 5 Asts: Abrines, Satoranský 3 PIR: Abrines, Tomić 19	Arena: Palacio de Deportes; Attendance: 7,120; Referees: Conde, Calatrava, Munar

1 November 2015 4	FC Barcelona Lassa	97–61	RETAbet.es GBC	Barcelona
13:00 (CET)	Scoring by quarter: 16–17, 24–19, 32–16, 25–9
	Pts: Doellman 19; Rebs: Lawal 5 Asts: Ribas 6 PIR: Doellman 25	Boxscore	Pts: Grimau 14; Rebs: Milbourne 6 Asts: Lawrence 4 PIR: Grimau, Urtasun 12	Arena: Palau Blaugrana; Attendance: 4,212; Referees: Peruga, Guirao, Sanchez Mohedas

8 November 2015 5	MoraBanc Andorra	66–89	FC Barcelona Lassa	Andorra la Vella
13:00 (CET)	Scoring by quarter: 20–24, 20–23, 12–23, 14–19
	Pts: Bogdanović, Jones 10; Rebs: Gomes 7 Asts: Schreiner 7 PIR: Schreiner 14	Boxscore	Pts: Doellman, Tomić 15; Rebs: Tomić 8 Asts: Satoranský 10; PIR: Tomić 26	Arena: Poliesportiu d'Andorra; Attendance: 4,630; Referees: Hierrezuelo, Oyón, Fernández Sánchez

15 November 2015 6	FC Barcelona Lassa	67–57	Río Natura Monbús Obradoiro	Barcelona
13:00 (CET)	Scoring by quarter: 16–12, 18–19, 20–11, 13–15
	Pts: Tomić 18; Rebs: Tomić 11; Asts: Arroyo 8 PIR: Tomić 28	Boxscore	Pts: Caloiaro 14; Rebs: Pustovyi 7 Asts: McGrath, Pozas 2 PIR: Caloiaro 20	Arena: Palau Blaugrana; Attendance: 4,394; Referees: Bultó, Castillo, Fernández

22 November 2015 7	Laboral Kutxa Baskonia	87–79(OT)	FC Barcelona Lassa	Vitoria-Gasteiz
18:00 (CET)	Scoring by quarter: 17–12, 12–20, 23–20, 21–21, Overtime: 14–6
	Pts: Adams 24; Rebs: Bourousis 13; Asts: Causeur 5 PIR: Adams 25	Boxscore	Pts: Perperoglou 20; Rebs: Lawal 8 Asts: Satoranský 7 PIR: Perperoglou 17	Arena: Fernando Buesa Arena; Attendance: 11,629; Referees: García González, Cortés, Pérez Niz

29 November 2015 8	FC Barcelona Lassa	76–65	Montakit Fuenlabrada	Barcelona
13:00 (CET)	Scoring by quarter: 21–13, 16–18, 19–15, 20–19
	Pts: Doellman 15; Rebs: Doellman 10; Asts: Satoranský 4 PIR: Tomić 23	Boxscore	Pts: Paunić 16; Rebs: Stević 6 Asts: Úriz 14; PIR: Stević 16	Arena: Palau Blaugrana; Attendance: 4,605; Referees: Perea, García Ortiz, Serrano

6 December 2015 9	ICL Manresa	60–75	FC Barcelona Lassa	Manresa
19:00 (CET)	Scoring by quarter: 14–17, 17–22, 14–18, 15–18
	Pts: Otverchenko 11; Rebs: Grigonis 8 Asts: Otverchenko, Simon 4 PIR: Grigonis 13	Boxscore	Pts: Doellman; Rebs: three players 7 Asts: Ribas, Tomić 4 PIR: Doellman	Arena: Nou Congost; Attendance: 4,825; Referees: Jiménez Trujillo, Oyón, Cardús

13 December 2015 10	Unicaja	77–81	FC Barcelona Lassa	Málaga
18:00 (CET)	Scoring by quarter: 13–25, 11–22, 24–15, 29–19
	Pts: Hendrix 13; Rebs: Hendrix 9 Asts: three players 3 PIR: Hendrix 20	Boxscore	Pts: Doellman 19; Rebs: Doellman, Samuels 5 Asts: Arroyo, Satoranský 5 PIR: Doellman 24	Arena: Martín Carpena; Attendance: 9,597; Referees: Pérez Pérez, Peruga, Rial

20 December 2015 11	FC Barcelona Lassa	83–74	FIATC Joventut	Barcelona
20:00 (CET)	Scoring by quarter: 14–18, 28–14, 23–24, 18–18
	Pts: Tomić 17; Rebs: Samuels 9 Asts: Ribas, Vezenkov 3 PIR: Tomić 23	Boxscore	Pts: three players 11; Rebs: Miralles, Suton 5 Asts: Ventura, Vidal 4 PIR: Vidal 15	Arena: Palau Blaugrana; Attendance: 5,280; Referees: Arteaga, Guirao, Zamorano

23 December 2015 12	FC Barcelona Lassa	66–57	Dominion Bilbao Basket	Barcelona
20:45 (CET)	Scoring by quarter: 18–14, 11–20, 23–15, 14–8
	Pts: Ribas 17; Rebs: Tomić 12; Asts: Navarro 5 PIR: Doellman 21	Boxscore	Pts: Bertāns 19; Rebs: Bogris, Hervelle 6 Asts: Bertāns, López 3 PIR: Bertāns 15	Arena: Palau Blaugrana; Attendance: 4,680; Referees: Martín Bertrán, Sánchez Montserrat, Martín

27 December 2015 13	Real Madrid	84–91	FC Barcelona Lassa	Madrid
19:00 (CET)	Scoring by quarter: 23–25, 21–25, 14–24, 26–17
	Pts: Rodríguez 14; Rebs: Ayón 8 Asts: Ayón 5 PIR: Carroll 16	Boxscore	Pts: Doellman 17; Rebs: Satoranský 7 Asts: Satoranský 6 PIR: Satoranský 25	Arena: Barclaycard Center; Attendance: 13,149; Referees: Hierrezuelo, Calatrava, Manuel

3 January 2016 14	FC Barcelona Lassa	89–67	Movistar Estudiantes	Barcelona
13:00 (CET)	Scoring by quarter: 28–18, 18–15, 23–14, 20–20
	Pts: Ribas 17; Rebs: Doellman 12; Asts: Doellman 7 PIR: Satoranský 21	Boxscore	Pts: Hernangómez 13; Rebs: Hernangómez 7 Asts: Fernández 5 PIR: Hernangómez 16	Arena: Palau Blaugrana; Attendance: 5,022; Referees: Perea, Araña, Martínez Díez

10 January 2016 15	Iberostar Tenerife	64–83	FC Barcelona Lassa	San Cristóbal de La Laguna
13:00 (CET)	Scoring by quarter: 15–27, 21–15, 11–26, 17–19
	Pts: Abromaitis, Richotti 12; Rebs: Beirán 7 Asts: White 5 PIR: White 14	Boxscore	Pts: Abrines 17; Rebs: Samuels 7 Asts: Ribas 5 PIR: Doellman 16	Arena: Santiago Martín; Attendance: 4,517; Referees: Bultó, Peruga, Sánchez Mohedas

17 January 2016 16	Herbalife Gran Canaria	81–96	FC Barcelona Lassa	Las Palmas
20:30 (CET)	Scoring by quarter: 17–23, 24–34, 12–28, 28–11
	Pts: Omić 23; Rebs: Omić 6 Asts: Oliver 4 PIR: Omić 32	Boxscore	Pts: three players 16; Rebs: Lawal 9 Asts: Ribas 9 PIR: Satoranský 22	Arena: Gran Canaria Arena; Attendance: 8,696; Referees: Arteaga, Guirao, Fernández

24 January 2016 17	FC Barcelona Lassa	91–94(OT)	Valencia Basket	Barcelona
12:30 (CET)	Scoring by quarter: 21–23, 22–12, 13–22, 26–25, Overtime: 9–12
	Pts: Doellman, Satoranský 17; Rebs: Lawal 7 Asts: Satoranský 12; PIR: Satoranský 24	Boxscore	Pts: Dubljević 16; Rebs: Sikma 11; Asts: Sikma 6 PIR: San Emeterio 26	Arena: Palau Blaugrana; Attendance: 6,545; Referees: Conde, Cortés, Rial

31 January 2016 18	Rio Natura Monbus Obradoiro	62–69	FC Barcelona Lassa	Santiago de Compostela
19:45 (CET)	Scoring by quarter: 12–18, 25–21, 13–7, 12–23
	Pts: Yusta 11; Rebs: Triguero 8 Asts: Pozas 4 PIR: Yusta 15	Boxscore	Pts: Doellman 13; Rebs: Tomić 6 Asts: Ribas, Satoranský 4 PIR: Doellman, Satoranský 15	Arena: Multiusos Fontes do Sar; Attendance: 5,409; Referees: Pérez Pizarro, Martínez, Serrano

7 February 2016 19	FC Barcelona Lassa	84–79	MoraBanc Andorra	Barcelona
12:30 (CET)	Scoring by quarter: 21–25, 14–10, 25–23, 24–21
	Pts: Perperoglou, Ribas 17; Rebs: Tomić 8 Asts: Navarro, Satoranský 5 PIR: Perperoglou, Ribas 19	Boxscore	Pts: Shermadini 17; Rebs: Gomes 7 Asts: Stojanovski 4 PIR: Shermadini 18	Arena: Palau Blaugrana; Attendance: 4,154; Referees: Martín Bertrán, Sanchez Mohedas, Munar

14 February 2016 20	FC Barcelona Lassa	108–54	Baloncesto Sevilla	Barcelona
12:30 (CET)	Scoring by quarter: 27–12, 30–21, 34–8, 17–13
	Pts: Ribas, Satoranský 14; Rebs: Tomić 10; Asts: Arroyo 9 PIR: Satoranský, Vezenkov 22	Boxscore	Pts: Nachbar 9 Rebs: Balvín 7 Asts: Miljenović, Rodríguez 3 PIR: Balvín 7	Arena: Palau Blaugrana; Attendance: 5,003; Referees: Hierrezuelo, Calatrava, Sacristán

28 February 2016 21	CAI Zaragoza	76–87	FC Barcelona Lassa	Zaragoza
19:30 (CET)	Scoring by quarter: 13–21, 24–24, 16–27, 23–15
	Pts: Jelovac 21; Rebs: Jelovac 6 Asts: Bellas, Tomàs 3 PIR: Jelovac 23	Boxscore	Pts: Doellman 14; Rebs: Tomić 11; Asts: Satoranský 5 PIR: Satoranský, Tomić 17	Arena: Pabellón Príncipe Felipe; Attendance: 8,104; Referees: García González, García Ortiz, Rial

6 March 2016 22	FC Barcelona Lassa	83–77	Unicaja	Barcelona
18:00 (CET)	Scoring by quarter: 21–24, 21–25, 23–15, 18–13
	Pts: Arroyo 15; Rebs: Tomić 11; Asts: Tomić 6 PIR: Ribas 15	Boxscore	Pts: Cooley 17; Rebs: Díez 9 Asts: three players 4 PIR: Cooley 27	Arena: Palau Blaugrana; Attendance: 4,029; Referees: Pérez Pizarro, Araña, Munar

13 March 2016 23	FIATC Joventut	59–85	FC Barcelona Lassa	Badalona
18:00 (CET)	Scoring by quarter: 17–19, 16–16, 15–24, 11–26
	Pts: Abalde 14; Rebs: Drame 6 Asts: Miralles 4 PIR: Abalde 13	Boxscore	Pts: Doellman 21; Rebs: Satoranský, Tomić 7 Asts: three players 4 PIR: Doellman 23	Arena: Palau Municipal d'Esports; Attendance: 9,143; Referees: Hierrezuelo, Bultó, Sanchez Mohedas

20 March 2016 24	FC Barcelona Lassa	77–71	UCAM Murcia	Barcelona
12:30 (CET)	Scoring by quarter: 11–16, 22–26, 26–15, 18–14
	Pts: Doellman 18; Rebs: Tomić 8 Asts: Arroyo, Satoranský 2 PIR: Doellman 21	Boxscore	Pts: Faverani 19; Rebs: three players 7 Asts: Lishchuk 3 PIR: Faverani 24	Arena: Palau Blaugrana; Attendance: 4,526; Referees: Peruga, Calatrava, Planells

27 March 2016 25	RETAbet.es GBC	69–84	FC Barcelona Lassa	San Sebastián
12:30 (CEST)	Scoring by quarter: 18–26, 11–21, 21–20, 19–17
	Pts: Landry 25; Rebs: Landry 5 Asts: Urtasun 6 PIR: Landry 26	Boxscore	Pts: Satoranský, Vezenkov 15; Rebs: Tomić 10; Asts: Tomić 6 PIR: Satoranský, Tomić 25	Arena: San Sebastián Arena; Attendance: 3,801; Referees: Conde, Sánchez Monserrat, Serrano

3 April 2016 26	FC Barcelona Lassa	84–57	ICL Manresa	Barcelona
12:30 (CEST)	Scoring by quarter: 20–10, 18–16, 31–17, 15–14
	Pts: four players 13; Rebs: Vezenkov 7 Asts: Satoranský 7 PIR: Satoranský 21	Boxscore	Pts: Musli 14; Rebs: Musli 8 Asts: Foster 4 PIR: Musli 16	Arena: Palau Blaugrana; Attendance: 5,495; Referees: Pérez Pizarro, Martínez, Aliaga

9 April 2016 27	Montakit Fuenlabrada	82–84	FC Barcelona Lassa	Fuenlabrada
19:30 (CEST)	Scoring by quarter: 14–28, 22–15, 28–23, 18–18
	Pts: Urtasun 17; Rebs: Sobin, Urtasun 5 Asts: Tabu 6 PIR: Urtasun 23	Boxscore	Pts: Satoranský 20; Rebs: Dorsey 6 Asts: Tomić 6 PIR: Satoranský 26	Arena: Fernando Martín; Attendance: 5,443; Referees: Jiménez, Araña, Mas Cagide

24 April 2016 29	FC Barcelona Lassa	86–91	Real Madrid	Barcelona
12:30 (CEST)	Scoring by quarter: 26–17, 26–26, 19–20, 15–28
	Pts: Tomić 19; Rebs: Tomić 12; Asts: Arroyo 8 PIR: Tomić 31	Boxscore	Pts: Thompkins 25; Rebs: Ayón, Thompkins 7 Asts: Mačiulis, Rodríguez 6 PIR: Rodríguez 31	Arena: Palau Blaugrana; Attendance: 6,627; Referees: García González, Peruga, Manuel

29 April 2016 28	FC Barcelona Lassa	89–68	Laboral Kutxa Baskonia	Barcelona
19:00 (CEST)	Scoring by quarter: 17–6, 20–24, 27–20, 25–18
	Pts: Satoranský 16; Rebs: Tomić 10; Asts: Ribas 6 PIR: Tomić 19	Boxscore	Pts: Bourousis 18; Rebs: Bourousis 10; Asts: Adams, James 4 PIR: Bourousis 19	Arena: Palau Blaugrana; Attendance: 4,063; Referees: Pérez Pérez, Cortés, Fernández

1 May 2016 30	Dominion Bilbao Basket	55–77	FC Barcelona Lassa	Bilbao
18:00 (CEST)	Scoring by quarter: 12–19, 15–13, 16–16, 12–29
	Pts: Hannah 19; Rebs: M. Todorović 7 Asts: Mumbrú 2 PIR: M. Todorović 12	Boxscore	Pts: Tomić 16; Rebs: Tomić 15; Asts: Ribas, Tomić 3 PIR: Tomić 32	Arena: Bilbao Arena; Attendance: 9,890; Referees: Arteaga, Calatrava, Caballero

8 May 2016 31	Valencia Basket	75–65	FC Barcelona Lassa	Valencia
19:30 (CEST)	Scoring by quarter: 19–17, 20–14, 15–17, 21–17
	Pts: San Emeterio 13; Rebs: Hamilton 7 Asts: Martínez 4 PIR: Sikma 14	Boxscore	Pts: Doellman 14; Rebs: Doellman, Tomić 7 Asts: Satoranský 8 PIR: Satoranský 19	Arena: Fuente de San Luis; Attendance: 8,500; Referees: Martín Bertrán, Bultó, Munar

11 May 2016 32	FC Barcelona Lassa	85–75	Herbalife Gran Canaria	Barcelona
20:30 (CEST)	Scoring by quarter: 27–18, 16–26, 22–17, 20–14
	Pts: Abrines, Navarro 16; Rebs: Lawal, Samuels 5 Asts: three players 3 PIR: Abrines, Navarro 19	Boxscore	Pts: Seeley 20; Rebs: Báez, Omić 8 Asts: Pangos 4 PIR: Omić 22	Arena: Palau Blaugrana; Attendance: 3,879; Referees: Hierrezuelo, García Ortiz, Sacristán

15 May 2016 33	Movistar Estudiantes	74–69	FC Barcelona Lassa	Madrid
18:30 (CEST)	Scoring by quarter: 17–17, 19–18, 15–15, 23–19
	Pts: Laprovíttola, Martín 17; Rebs: Martín 11; Asts: Laprovíttola 7 PIR: Laprovíttola 22	Boxscore	Pts: Doellman 19; Rebs: Doellman, Tomić 8 Asts: Satoranský 4 PIR: Doellman 27	Arena: Barclaycard Center; Attendance: 8,931; Referees: Jiménez, Araña, Más

22 May 2016 34	FC Barcelona Lassa	93–58	Iberostar Tenerife	Barcelona
12:30 (CEST)	Scoring by quarter: 23–16, 17–16, 27–12, 26–14
	Pts: Doellman 15; Rebs: Samuels, Tomić 7 Asts: Abrines, Navarro 5 PIR: Tomić 27	Boxscore	Pts: Beirán 13; Rebs: O'Leary, Beirán 6 Asts: Beirán 4 PIR: Beirán 21	Arena: Palau Blaugrana; Attendance: 5,089; Referees: Conde, Peruga

==== Results overview ====
Win Draw Loss

Opposition	Home score	Away score	Double
Baloncesto Sevilla	108–54	58–97	205–112
CAI Zaragoza	84–76	76–87	171–152
Dominion Bilbao Basket	66–57	55–77	143–112
FIATC Joventut	83–74	59–85	168–133
Herbalife Gran Canaria	85–75	81–96	181–156
Iberostar Tenerife	93–58	64–83	176–122
ICL Manresa	84–57	60–75	159–117
Laboral Kutxa Baskonia	89–68	87–79	168–155
Montakit Fuenlabrada	76–65	82–84	160–147
MoraBanc Andorra	84–79	66–89	173–145
Movistar Estudiantes	89–67	74–69	158–141
Real Madrid	86–91	84–91	177–175
RETAbet.es GBC	97–61	69–84	181–130
Rio Natura Monbus Obradoiro	67–57	62–69	136–119
UCAM Murcia	77–71	74–82	159–145
Unicaja	83–77	77–81	164–154
Valencia Basket	91–94	75–65	156–169

=== ACB Playoffs ===
Win Loss

==== Quarterfinals ====
26 May 2016 1st leg	FC Barcelona Lassa	99–65	Montakit Fuenlabrada	Barcelona
21:00 (CEST)	Scoring by quarter: 31–15, 23–17, 20–17, 25–16
	Pts: Tomić 15; Rebs: Tomić 9 Asts: Satoranský 9 PIR: Tomić 30	Boxscore	Pts: Llorca 12; Rebs: Sobin 7 Asts: Úriz 5 PIR: Llorca 12	Arena: Palau Blaugrana; Attendance: 4,052; Referees: Cortés, Castillo, Rial

29 May 2016 2nd leg	Montakit Fuenlabrada	68–84	FC Barcelona Lassa	Fuenlabrada
20:30 (CEST)	Scoring by quarter: 16–18, 20–20, 9–29, 23–17
	Pts: Urtasun 14; Rebs: González 8 Asts: Tabu, Úriz 3 PIR: Urtasun 13	Boxscore	Pts: Satoranský 21; Rebs: Doellman 8 Asts: Satoranský 7 PIR: Satoranský 27	Arena: Fernando Martín; Attendance: 5,395; Referees: Conde, García Ortiz, Sánchez Mohedas

==== Semifinals ====
3 June 2016 1st leg	FC Barcelona Lassa	84–57	Laboral Kutxa Baskonia	Barcelona
21:00 (CEST)	Scoring by quarter: 16–9, 27–19, 24–15, 17–14
	Pts: Tomić 14; Rebs: Samuels 8 Asts: Tomić 4 PIR: Satoranský, Tomić 22	Boxscore	Pts: Hanga 15; Rebs: Hanga 8 Asts: James 4 PIR: Hanga 24	Arena: Palau Blaugrana; Attendance: 5,547; Referees: Hierrezuelo, Jiménez, Araña

5 June 2016 2nd leg	FC Barcelona Lassa	73–68	Laboral Kutxa Baskonia	Barcelona
12:30 (CEST)	Scoring by quarter: 25–17, 15–18, 12–21, 21–12
	Pts: Perperoglou 11; Rebs: Perperoglou, Tomić 5 Asts: Tomić 4 PIR: Perperoglou 15	Boxscore	Pts: James 15; Rebs: Tillie 7 Asts: James 4 PIR: James 19	Arena: Palau Blaugrana; Attendance: 5,027; Referees: Pérez Pizarro, Cortés, Peruga

8 June 2016 3rd leg	Laboral Kutxa Baskonia	89–83(OT)	FC Barcelona Lassa	Vitoria-Gasteiz
21:00 (CEST)	Scoring by quarter: 15–21, 17–16, 13–17, 31–22, Overtime: 13–7
	Pts: Bourousis 32; Rebs: Bourousis 10; Asts: Adams 5 PIR: Bourousis 39	Boxscore	Pts: Satoranský 19; Rebs: Doellman 10; Asts: Satoranský 5 PIR: Tomić 21	Arena: Fernando Buesa Arena; Attendance: 10,225; Referees: Pérez Pérez, Conde, Calatrava

10 June 2016 4th leg	Laboral Kutxa Baskonia	63–85	FC Barcelona Lassa	Vitoria-Gasteiz
20:30 (CEST)	Scoring by quarter: 14–24, 17–23, 17–19, 15–19
	Pts: Tillie 13; Rebs: Bourousis 11; Asts: James 6 PIR: Tillie 19	Boxscore	Pts: Tomić 15; Rebs: Tomić 11; Asts: Navarro, Tomić 5 PIR: Tomić 28	Arena: Fernando Buesa Arena; Attendance: 11,628; Referees: Jiménez Trujillo, Cortés, Peruga

==== Finals ====
15 June 2016 1st leg	FC Barcelona Lassa	100–99	Real Madrid	Barcelona
20:30 (CEST)	Scoring by quarter: 22–22, 25–26, 33–27, 20–24
	Pts: Doellman 19; Rebs: Tomić 8 Asts: Tomić 8 PIR: Tomić 24	Boxscore	Pts: Carroll 21; Rebs: Ayón 6 Asts: Llull 10; PIR: Carroll 26	Arena: Palau Blaugrana; Attendance: 6,471; Referees: García González, Pérez Pérez, Calatrava

17 June 2016 2nd leg	FC Barcelona Lassa	70–90	Real Madrid	Barcelona
19:00 (CEST)	Scoring by quarter: 12–28, 20–16, 26–22, 12–24
	Pts: Tomić 14; Rebs: Doellman, Tomić 5 Asts: Satoranský 5 PIR: Perperoglou, Samuels 14	Boxscore	Pts: Llull 20; Rebs: Ayón 6 Asts: Rodríguez 5 PIR: Ayón 28	Arena: Palau Blaugrana; Attendance: 6,742; Referees: Hierrezuelo, Jiménez, Peruga

20 June 2016 3rd leg	Real Madrid	91–74	FC Barcelona Lassa	Madrid
20:00 (CEST)	Scoring by quarter: 29–21, 25–20, 23–17, 14–16
	Pts: Llull 21; Rebs: Ayón 6 Asts: Llull 7 PIR: Llull 30	Boxscore	Pts: Tomić 18; Rebs: Doellman 8 Asts: Ribas 6 PIR: Doellman 21	Arena: Barclaycard Center; Attendance: 12,038; Referees: Pérez Pizarro, Conde, Cortés

22 June 2016 4th leg	Real Madrid	91–84	FC Barcelona Lassa	Madrid
20:30 (CEST)	Scoring by quarter: 19–26, 26–21, 27–18, 19–19
	Pts: Llull 21; Rebs: Ayón 9 Asts: Reyes 6 PIR: Llull 23	Boxscore	Pts: Satoranský, Tomić 17; Rebs: Tomić 8 Asts: Navarro 7 PIR: Satoranský 25	Arena: Barclaycard Center; Attendance: 12,173; Referees: Hierrezuelo, García González, Jiménez

=== Euroleague ===
==== Regular season ====
Pos	Team	Pld	W	L	PF	PA	PD	Qualification
1	(Russia) Lokomotiv Kuban	10	8	2	754	683	+71	Advance to Top 16
2	(Spain) FC Barcelona Lassa	10	6	4	822	747	+75	Advance to Top 16
3	(Greece) Panathinaikos	10	6	4	756	710	+46	Advance to Top 16
4	(Lithuania) Žalgiris	10	5	5	697	731	−34	Advance to Top 16
5	(Turkey) Pınar Karşıyaka	10	3	7	698	772	−74	Transfer to Eurocup
6	(Poland) Stelmet Zielona Góra	10	2	8	664	748	−84	Transfer to Eurocup

Source: Euroleague

Win Loss

15 October 2015 1	Pınar Karşıyaka (Turkey)	71–62	(Spain) FC Barcelona Lassa	İzmir, Turkey
18:00 (CEST)	Scoring by quarter: 18–18, 11–9, 25–11, 17–24
	Pts: Iverson 16; Rebs: Gabriel 10; Asts: Sipahi 6 PIR: Iverson 19	Boxscore	Pts: Doellman 14; Rebs: Doellman 7 Asts: Ribas 4 PIR: Doellman 19	Arena: Karşıyaka Arena; Attendance: 4,579; Referees: Luigi Lamonica (ITA), Siniša Herceg (CRO), Sašo Petek (SLO)

23 October 2015 2	FC Barcelona Lassa (Spain)	78–72	(Poland) Stelmet Zielona Góra	Barcelona, Spain
21:00 (CEST)	Scoring by quarter: 19–20, 24–17, 21–20, 14–15
	Pts: Samuels 23; Rebs: Lawal 12; Asts: Tomić 5 PIR: Samuels 33	Boxscore	Pts: Borovnjak, Ponitka 15; Rebs: Ponitka 9 Asts: Koszarek 7 PIR: Borovnjak 19	Arena: Palau Blaugrana; Attendance: 7,089; Referees: Christos Christodoulou (GRE), Petri Mäntylä (FIN), Tomislav Hordov (CRO)

29 October 2015 3	FC Barcelona Lassa (Spain)	77–52	(Greece) Panathinaikos	Barcelona, Spain
21:00 (CET)	Scoring by quarter: 17–11, 25–17, 13–15, 22–9
	Pts: Doellman 13; Rebs: Samuels 9 Asts: Tomić 4 PIR: Tomić 24	Boxscore	Pts: Gist 13; Rebs: Raduljica 9 Asts: Calathes 4 PIR: Raduljica 13	Arena: Palau Blaugrana; Attendance: 6,141; Referees: Saša Pukl (SLO), Eddie Viator (FRA), Oļegs Latiševs (LAT)

6 November 2015 4	Žalgiris (Lithuania)	78–85	(Spain) FC Barcelona Lassa	Kaunas, Lithuania
18:45 (CET)	Scoring by quarter: 23–22, 16–23, 18–22, 21–18
	Pts: Seibutis 18; Rebs: Vougioukas 7 Asts: Ulanovas 5 PIR: Jankūnas 21	Boxscore	Pts: Tomić 18; Rebs: Tomić 8 Asts: Satoranský 4 PIR: Tomić 22	Arena: Žalgirio Arena; Attendance: 14,790; Referees: Robert Lottermoser (GER), Carmelo Paternico (ITA), Amit Balak (ISR)

12 November 2015 5	FC Barcelona Lassa (Spain)	72–68	(Russia) Lokomotiv Kuban	Barcelona, Spain
20:45 (CET)	Scoring by quarter: 18–16, 19–15, 11–18, 24–19
	Pts: Tomić 16; Rebs: Satoranský 6 Asts: Tomić 7 PIR: Tomić 24	Boxscore	Pts: Draper 20; Rebs: Singleton 8 Asts: Delaney 4 PIR: Draper 21	Arena: Palau Blaugrana; Attendance: 4,867; Referees: Ilija Belošević (SRB), Elias Koromilas (GRE), Joseph Bissang (FRA)

19 November 2015 6	FC Barcelona Lassa (Spain)	107–79	(Turkey) Pınar Karşıyaka	Barcelona, Spain
21:00 (CET)	Scoring by quarter: 26–16, 22–21, 31–20, 28–22
	Pts: Lawal 19; Rebs: Tomić 7 Asts: Satoranský 6 PIR: Lawal 24	Boxscore	Pts: Ragland 26; Rebs: Iverson, Ragland 7 Asts: Sipahi 7 PIR: Ragland 26	Arena: Palau Blaugrana; Attendance: 4,771; Referees: Christos Christodoulou (GRE), Damir Javor (SLO), Petar Obradović (BIH)

26 November 2015 7	Stelmet Zielona Góra (Poland)	64–93	(Spain) FC Barcelona Lassa	Zielona Góra, Poland
19:00 (CET)	Scoring by quarter: 18–24, 17–20, 15–25, 14–24
	Pts: Ponitka 11; Rebs: Ponitka 6 Asts: Bost 5 PIR: Ponitka 15	Boxscore	Pts: Abrines 16; Rebs: Tomić 6 Asts: Ribas 7 PIR: Vezenkov 23	Arena: Centrum Rekreacyjno Sportowe; Attendance: 5,002; Referees: Milivoje Jovčić (SRB), Panagiotis Anastopoulos (GRE), Tolga Sahin (ITA)

4 December 2015 8	Panathinaikos (Greece)	93–86	(Spain) FC Barcelona Lassa	Athens, Greece
20:45 (CET)	Scoring by quarter: 21–22, 24–13, 21–22, 27–29
	Pts: Raduljica 25; Rebs: Calathes 7 Asts: Calathes 10; PIR: Raduljica 31	Boxscore	Pts: Abrines 21; Rebs: Tomić 11; Asts: Satoranský 4 PIR: Tomić 20	Arena: Olympic Sports Center Athens; Attendance: 13,972; Referees: Robert Lottermosser (GER), Piotr Pastusiak (POL), Sergey Zashchuk (UKR)

10 December 2015 9	FC Barcelona Lassa (Spain)	88–92	(Lithuania) Žalgiris	Barcelona, Spain
21:00 (CET)	Scoring by quarter: 16–27, 22–18, 25–25, 25–22
	Pts: Tomić 28; Rebs: Tomić, Vezenkov 5 Asts: Ribas 5 PIR: Tomić 38	Boxscore	Pts: Jankūnas 17; Rebs: Ulanovas 7 Asts: Kalnietis 6 PIR: Kalnietis 18	Arena: Palau Blaugrana; Attendance: 4,236; Referees: Spiros Gkontas (GRE), Marcin Kowalski (POL), Aare Halliko (EST)

18 December 2015 10	Lokomotiv Kuban (Russia)	78–74	(Spain) FC Barcelona Lassa	Krasnodar, Russia
18:00 (CET)	Scoring by quarter: 18–17, 11–18, 25–25, 24–14
	Pts: Randolph 16; Rebs: Randolph 7 Asts: Delaney 9 PIR: Delaney 27	Boxscore	Pts: Navarro 22; Rebs: Tomić 7 Asts: Arroyo 5 PIR: Navarro 23	Arena: Basket Hall; Attendance: 7,353; Referees: Ilija Belošević (SRB), Jakub Zamojski (POL), David Romano (ISR)

==== Top 16 ====
Pos	Team	Pld	W	L	PF	PA	PD	Qualification
1	(Russia) CSKA Moscow	14	10	4	1299	1185	+114	Advance to Playoffs
2	(Spain) Laboral Kutxa	14	9	5	1110	1075	+35	Advance to Playoffs
3	(Spain) FC Barcelona Lassa	14	8	6	1085	1059	+26	Advance to Playoffs
4	(Spain) Real Madrid	14	7	7	1173	1165	+8	Advance to Playoffs
5	(Russia) Khimki	14	7	7	1164	1138	+26	
6	(Germany) Brose Baskets	14	7	7	1073	1088	−15	
7	(Greece) Olympiacos	14	6	8	1083	1105	−22	
8	(Lithuania) Žalgiris	14	2	12	1007	1179	−172	

Source: Euroleague

Win Loss

29 December 2015 1	Olympiacos (Greece)	74–62	(Spain) FC Barcelona Lassa	Piraeus, Greece
20:00 (CET)	Scoring by quarter: 14–14, 25–12, 17–14, 18–22
	Pts: Spanoulis 11; Rebs: Papapetrou 7 Asts: Spanoulis 9 PIR: Spanoulis, Strawberry 14	Boxscore	Pts: Tomić 16; Rebs: Samuels 7 Asts: Ribas 8 PIR: Tomić 17	Arena: Peace and Friendship Stadium; Attendance: 11,144; Referees: Luigi Lamonica (ITA), Eddie Viator (FRA), Miloš Koljenšić (MNE)

7 January 2016 2	FC Barcelona Lassa (Spain)	87–70	(Russia) Khimki	Barcelona, Spain
20:45 (CET)	Scoring by quarter: 23–16, 26–13, 18–22, 20–19
	Pts: Navarro, Ribas 14; Rebs: Ribas 6 Asts: three players 4 PIR: Ribas 19	Boxscore	Pts: Rice 14; Rebs: Augustine, Sokolov 7 Asts: Rice 7 PIR: three players 13	Arena: Palau Blaugrana; Attendance: 5,731; Referees: Milivoje Jovčić (SRB), Saša Pukl (SLO), Tolga Sahin (ITA)

14 January 2016 3	CSKA Moscow (Russia)	93–82	(Spain) FC Barcelona Lassa	Moscow, Russia
18:00 (CET)	Scoring by quarter: 28–29, 26–17, 22–13, 17–23
	Pts: Higgins 20; Rebs: Vorontsevich 9 Asts: Teodosić 6 PIR: Vorontsevich 25	Boxscore	Pts: Navarro 16; Rebs: Tomić 8 Asts: four players 3 PIR: Doellman 19	Arena: Megasport Arena; Attendance: 11,783; Referees: Robert Lottermoser (GER), Damir Javor (SLO), Piotr Pastusiak (POL)

21 January 2016 4	Real Madrid (Spain)	86–87	(Spain) FC Barcelona Lassa	Madrid, Spain
20:45 (CET)	Scoring by quarter: 27–17, 21–20, 15–25, 23–25
	Pts: Rodríguez 18; Rebs: Reyes 7 Asts: Rodríguez 13; PIR: Rodríguez 27	Boxscore	Pts: Doellman 24; Rebs: Lawal 6 Asts: Satoranský 8 PIR: Doellman 26	Arena: Barclaycard Center; Attendance: 12,018; Referees: Fernando Rocha (POR), Elias Koromilas (GRE), Oļegs Latiševs (LAT)

29 January 2016 5	FC Barcelona Lassa (Spain)	78–81OT	(Spain) Laboral Kutxa	Barcelona, Spain
21:00 (CET)	Scoring by quarter: 15–13, 14–18, 15–20, 26–19, Overtime: 8–11
	Pts: Abrines 21; Rebs: Lawal 10; Asts: Satoranský 5 PIR: Abrines 28	Boxscore	Pts: Bourousis 24; Rebs: Bourousis, Causeur 8 Asts: Bourousis, Shengelia 3 PIR: Bourousis 28	Arena: Palau Blaugrana; Attendance: 5,623; Referees: Christos Christodoulou (GRE), Carmelo Paternico (ITA), Joseph Bissang (FRA)

4 February 2016 6	Brose Baskets (Germany)	74–70	(Spain) FC Barcelona Lassa	Bamberg, Germany
20:00 (CET)	Scoring by quarter: 13–17, 22–15, 18–18, 21–20
	Pts: Strēlnieks 16; Rebs: Theis 8 Asts: Strēlnieks, Zisis 4 PIR: Melli, Miller 17	Boxscore	Pts: Doellman 19; Rebs: Doellman 7 Asts: Ribas 6 PIR: Doellman 19	Arena: Brose Arena; Attendance: 6,800; Referees: Milivoje Jovčić (SRB), Eddie Viator (FRA), Siniša Herceg (CRO)

12 February 2016 7	FC Barcelona Lassa (Spain)	92–86	(Lithuania) Žalgiris	Barcelona, Spain
21:00 (CET)	Scoring by quarter: 16–19, 22–12, 27–24, 27–31
	Pts: Navarro 14; Rebs: Doellman, Lawal 8 Asts: Oleson, Ribas 5 PIR: Doellman 20	Boxscore	Pts: Seibutis 19; Rebs: Jankūnas 7 Asts: Seibutis 4 PIR: Ulanovas 30	Arena: Palau Blaugrana; Attendance: 6,286; Referees: Ilija Belošević (SRB), Piotr Pastusiak (POL), Petri Mäntylä (FIN)

26 February 2016 8	FC Barcelona Lassa (Spain)	82–66	(Greece) Olympiacos	Barcelona, Spain
20:45 (CET)	Scoring by quarter: 19–19, 26–12, 26–16, 11–19
	Pts: Perperoglou 16; Rebs: Dorsey 8 Asts: Satoranský 5 PIR: Perperoglou 21	Boxscore	Pts: Hackett 16; Rebs: Hunter, Printezis 7 Asts: three players 2 PIR: Printezis 19	Arena: Palau Blaugrana; Attendance: 6,279; Referees: Luigi Lamonica (ITA), Borys Rhyzhyk (UKR), Miloš Koljenšić (MNE)

3 March 2016 9	Khimki (Russia)	75–61	(Spain) FC Barcelona Lassa	Moscow, Russia
18:00 (CET)	Scoring by quarter: 24–14, 24–15, 13–14, 14–18
	Pts: Shved 16; Rebs: Honeycutt 10; Asts: Rice 7 PIR: Shved, Honeycutt 22	Boxscore	Pts: Doellman 14; Rebs: Doellman 7 Asts: Satoranský 4 PIR: Doellman 16	Arena: Krylatskoye Sports Palace; Attendance: 3,800; Referees: Christos Christodoulou (GRE), Sreten Radović (CRO), Amit Balak (ISR)

11 March 2016 10	FC Barcelona Lassa (Spain)	100–98(OT)	(Russia) CSKA Moscow	Barcelona, Spain
20:45 (CET)	Scoring by quarter: 21–24, 26–14, 13–26, 25–21, Overtime: 15–13
	Pts: Tomić 21; Rebs: Doellman 10; Asts: Doellman 4 PIR: Satoranský 25	Boxscore	Pts: de Colo 30; Rebs: de Colo, Teodosić 7 Asts: Teodosić 6 PIR: de Colo 33	Arena: Palau Blaugrana; Attendance: 6,778; Referees: Ilija Belošević (SRB), Piotr Pastusiak (POL), Boris Shulga (UKR)

17 March 2016 11	FC Barcelona Lassa (Spain)	72–65	(Spain) Real Madrid	Barcelona, Spain
20:45 (CET)	Scoring by quarter: 25–4, 15–24, 12–23, 20–14
	Pts: Perperoglou 20; Rebs: Dorsey 10; Asts: Satoranský 3 PIR: Satoranský 20	Boxscore	Pts: Ayón 16; Rebs: Ayón 7 Asts: Rodríguez 6 PIR: Ayón 18	Arena: Palau Blaugrana; Attendance: 7,142; Referees: Robert Lottermoser (GER), Eddie Viator (FRA), Matej Boltauzer (SLO)

23 March 2016 12	Laboral Kutxa (Spain)	75–71	(Spain) FC Barcelona Lassa	Vitoria-Gasteiz, Spain
20:30 (CET)	Scoring by quarter: 15–16, 25–17, 16–12, 19–26
	Pts: Bourousis 22; Rebs: Bourousis, Hanga 7 Asts: James 5 PIR: Bourousis 23	Boxscore	Pts: Satoranský 20; Rebs: Dorsey 6 Asts: Satoranský 6 PIR: Satoranský 26	Arena: Fernando Buesa Arena; Attendance: 12,789; Referees: Milivoje Jovčić (SRB), Oļegs Latiševs (LAT), Ioannis Foufis (GRE)

31 March 2016 13	FC Barcelona Lassa (Spain)	75–57	(Germany) Brose Baskets	Barcelona, Spain
20:45 (CEST)	Scoring by quarter: 18–12, 25–11, 16–18, 16–16
	Pts: Abrines 13; Rebs: Dorsey 9 Asts: Tomić 4 PIR: Dorsey 18	Boxscore	Pts: Wanamaker 16; Rebs: Wanamaker 8 Asts: Miller 4 PIR: Wanamaker 20	Arena: Palau Blaugrana; Attendance: 6,717; Referees: Christos Christodoulou (GRE), Saša Pukl (SLO), Sinisa Herceg (CRO)

7 April 2016 14	Žalgiris (Lithuania)	59–66	(Spain) FC Barcelona Lassa	Kaunas, Lithuania
18:45 (CEST)	Scoring by quarter: 16–16, 18–12, 14–21, 11–17
	Pts: Vecvagars 13; Rebs: Jankūnas 9 Asts: Ulanovas 4 PIR: Jankūnas 15	Boxscore	Pts: Ribas 12; Rebs: Ribas 13; Asts: Satoranský 5 PIR: Ribas 25	Arena: Žalgirio Arena; Attendance: 9,090; Referees: Petri Mäntylä (FIN), Tolga Sahin (ITA), Tomislav Hordov (CRO)

==== Playoffs ====
Win Loss

13 April 2016 1	Lokomotiv Kuban (Russia)	66–61	(Spain) FC Barcelona Lassa	Krasnodar, Russia
19:00 (CEST)	Scoring by quarter: 17–19, 10–14, 23–20, 16–8
	Pts: Randolph 17; Rebs: Randolph 10; Asts: Delaney 7 PIR: Randolph 26	Boxscore	Pts: Doellman, Ribas 13; Rebs: Arroyo 6 Asts: Satoranský 8 PIR: Arroyo, Ribas 9	Arena: Basket Hall; Attendance: 7,235; Referees: Luigi Lamonica (ITA), Ilija Belošević (SRB), Robert Lottermoser (GER)

15 April 2016 2	Lokomotiv Kuban (Russia)	66–92	(Spain) FC Barcelona Lassa	Krasnodar, Russia
19:00 (CEST)	Scoring by quarter: 19–24, 12–24, 18–23, 17–21
	Pts: Delaney 19; Rebs: Randolph 6 Asts: Claver 5 PIR: Delaney 22	Boxscore	Pts: Navarro 18; Rebs: Tomić 10; Asts: Satoranský 10; PIR: Satoranský 23	Arena: Basket Hall; Attendance: 7,457; Referees: Fernando Rocha (POR), Carmelo Paternico (ITA), Oļegs Latiševs (LAT)

19 April 2016 3	FC Barcelona Lassa (Spain)	82–70	(Russia) Lokomotiv Kuban	Barcelona, Spain
20:45 (CEST)	Scoring by quarter: 19–23, 23–13, 19–14, 21–20
	Pts: Abrines 25; Rebs: Doellman 7 Asts: Ribas, Satoranský 4 PIR: Abrines 24	Boxscore	Pts: Randolph 16; Rebs: Randolph, Singleton 6 Asts: Claver, Broekhoff 2 PIR: Randolph 16	Arena: Palau Blaugrana; Attendance: 6,414; Referees: Christos Christodoulou (GRE), Damir Javor (SLO), Eddie Viator (FRA)

21 April 2016 4	FC Barcelona Lassa (Spain)	80–92(OT)	(Russia) Lokomotiv Kuban	Barcelona, Spain
20:45 (CEST)	Scoring by quarter: 19–21, 16–19, 19–11, 22–25, Overtime: 4–16
	Pts: Navarro 19; Rebs: Tomić 6 Asts: Navarro 4 PIR: Tomić 25	Boxscore	Pts: Randolph 28; Rebs: Claver 10; Asts: Delaney 7 PIR: Randolph 28	Arena: Palau Blaugrana; Attendance: 7,083; Referees: Sreten Radović (CRO), Borys Ryzhyk (UKR), Milivoje Jovčić (SRB)

26 April 2016 5	Lokomotiv Kuban (Russia)	81–67	(Spain) FC Barcelona Lassa	Krasnodar, Russia
19:00 (CEST)	Scoring by quarter: 26–21, 24–18, 8–23, 23–5
	Pts: Delaney 17; Rebs: Singleton 12; Asts: Delaney 6 PIR: Singleton 27	Boxscore	Pts: Perperoglou 13; Rebs: Tomić 8 Asts: Satoranský 7 PIR: Satoranský 15	Arena: Basket Hall; Attendance: 7,495; Referees: Luigi Lamonica (ITA), Robert Lottermosser (GER), Oļegs Latiševs (LAT)

=== Copa del Rey ===
Win Loss

18 February 2016 Quarterfinals	FC Barcelona Lassa	72–73	Dominion Bilbao Basket	A Coruña
19:00 (CET)	Scoring by quarter: 18–20, 19–20, 18–15, 17–18
	Pts: Oleson 14; Rebs: Doellman 8 Asts: Satoranský 3 PIR: Doellman 14	Boxscore	Pts: Ruoff 18; Rebs: three players 4 Asts: Bertāns, Hervelle 4 PIR: Ruoff 21	Arena: Coliseum; Attendance: 9,156; Referees: Hierrezuelo, Calatrava, Sacristán

== Statistics ==
Legend
GP	Games played	GS	Games started	MPG	Minutes per game
FG%	Field-goal percentage	3FG%	3-point field-goal percentage	FT%	Free-throw percentage
RPG	Rebounds per game	APG	Assists per game	SPG	Steals per game
BPG	Blocks per game	PPG	Points per game	PIR	PIR per game

=== Liga ACB ===
Player	GP	GS	MPG	FG%	3FG%	FT%	RPG	APG	SPG	BPG	PPG	PIR
Álex Abrines	37	15	19.2	.470	.396	.860	2.4	1.1	0.8	0.2	8.9	8.8
Carlos Arroyo	33	6	15.3	.393	.354	.875	1.0	2.5	0.5	0.0	5.5	3.8
Moussa Diagne	13	2	6.5	.583	.000	.625	1.7	0.2	0.1	0.3	1.5	1.2
Justin Doellman	40	38	24.3	.490	.431	.830	5.0	1.6	1.1	0.3	11.8	14.2
Joey Dorsey	2	0	14.1	.750	.000	.500	5.5	0.0	1.0	2.0	3.5	10.0
Marcus Eriksson	24	0	9.2	.423	.347	.556	1.1	0.4	0.4	0.0	3.4	3.0
Shane Lawal	26	3	10.4	.724	.000	.714	3.1	0.3	0.3	0.6	4.0	5.6
Juan Carlos Navarro	31	25	18.1	.382	.350	.886	1.3	2.2	0.5	0.0	7.9	6.0
Brad Oleson	42	14	16.5	.486	.442	.848	1.6	1.5	0.5	0.2	5.2	5.8
Stratos Perperoglou	43	28	20.2	.416	.331	.786	2.4	0.9	0.6	0.2	7.1	6.1
Pau Ribas	37	6	19.3	.467	.412	.878	2.1	3.1	0.7	0.0	7.7	9.2
Samardo Samuels	43	5	15.0	.557	.167	.612	3.7	0.5	0.4	0.5	6.7	8.3
Tomáš Satoranský	43	38	24.2	.567	.439	.775	3.0	4.3	1.0	0.1	10.7	15.3
Ante Tomić	43	38	21.0	.627	.500	.616	7.1	2.3	0.8	0.5	11.4	17.7
Aleksandar Vezenkov	43	2	13.1	.479	.346	.793	2.5	0.6	0.2	0.1	4.3	4.9

Last updated: April 14, 2026.
Source: ACB

=== Copa del Rey ===
Player	GP	GS	MPG	FG%	3FG%	FT%	RPG	APG	SPG	BPG	PPG	EFF
Álex Abrines	1	0	18.0	.167	.000	.000	0.0	0.0	0.0	0.0	2.0	0.0
Carlos Arroyo	1	0	14.0	.333	.000	.000	0.0	0.0	0.0	0.0	4.0	0.0
Moussa Diagne	0	0	0.0	.000	.000	.000	0.0	0.0	0.0	0.0	0.0	0.0
Justin Doellman	1	1	30.0	.500	.000	.500	8.0	2.0	1.0	0.0	11.0	14.0
Juan Carlos Navarro	1	1	10.0	.333	.000	1.000	1.0	0.0	1.0	0.0	6.0	7.0
Brad Oleson	1	0	18.0	.625	.667	.000	1.0	2.0	0.0	0.0	14.0	12.0
Stratos Perperoglou	1	1	22.0	.400	.667	.000	3.0	1.0	1.0	0.0	6.0	4.0
Pau Ribas	1	0	22.0	.429	.000	.750	3.0	1.0	1.0	0.0	9.0	7.0
Samardo Samuels	1	0	15.0	.667	.000	.200	3.0	2.0	0.0	0.0	5.0	0.6
Tomáš Satoranský	1	1	15.0	.500	.333	.000	0.0	3.0	0.0	0.0	5.0	7.0
Ante Tomić	1	1	23.0	.500	.000	.571	4.0	1.0	3.0	0.0	8.0	12.0
Aleksandar Vezenkov	1	0	10.0	.500	.000	.000	4.0	0.0	0.0	0.0	2.0	4.0

Last updated: February 18, 2016.
Source: ACB

=== Supercopa de España ===
Player	GP	GS	MPG	FG%	3FG%	FT%	RPG	APG	SPG	BPG	PPG	EFF
Álex Abrines	2	1	18.0	.385	.286	1.000	3.0	0.5	5.0	1.5	7.0	8.5
Carlos Arroyo	2	0	9.0	.429	.500	1.000	3.0	4.0	0.5	0.0	8.5	10.0
Moussa Diagne	2	0	8.0	1.000	.000	.500	2.0	0.0	0.0	0.0	3.0	3.0
Justin Doellman	2	2	21.0	.500	.600	1.000	1.5	0.5	1.5	0.5	10.5	9.0
Marcus Eriksson	2	0	8.0	.500	.750	1.000	1.0	0.0	0.5	0.0	8.0	8.5
Shane Lawal	2	2	18.0	.333	.000	1.000	6.5	0.5	0.5	1.5	3.0	7.0
Brad Oleson	2	0	16.0	.500	.556	1.000	0.0	2.5	0.0	0.0	8.5	8.0
Stratos Perperoglou	2	1	19.0	.400	.333	.000	1.5	2.0	0.0	0.0	7.5	4.0
Pau Ribas	2	2	22.0	.750	.500	1.000	2.5	3.0	1.0	0.0	12.0	18.0
Tomáš Satoranský	2	2	19.0	.556	.250	.000	2.0	5.0	2.0	0.0	5.5	11.0
Ante Tomić	2	0	15.0	1.000	.000	.333	4.5	0.5	0.5	0.0	6.5	11.5
Aleksandar Vezenkov	2	0	20.0	.333	.200	.500	4.5	1.0	1.0	0.0	4.0	3.0

Last updated: October 3, 2015.
Source: ACB

== Individual awards ==
=== Supercopa ===
MVP

- (Spain) Pau Ribas

=== Liga ACB ===
All-Liga ACB Second Team

- (Czech Republic) Tomáš Satoranský

Player of the Round

- (Croatia) Ante Tomić – Round 1
- (Czech Republic) Tomáš Satoranský – Round 28

Player of the Month

- (Czech Republic) Tomáš Satoranský – April

=== EuroLeague ===
Rising Star

- (Spain) Álex Abrines
