= 2015–16 Valencia BC season =

Valencia Basket
2015–16 season
- Chairman: Pablo Marín
- Head coach: Pedro Martínez
- Arena: Pabellón Fuente San Luis
- Liga ACB: TBD
- Copa del Rey: Quarterfinalists
- Eurocup: 3rd / Last 32
| Home | Away | Eurocup |

The 2015–16 season is Valencia Basket's 30th in existence and the club's 20th consecutive season in the top flight of Spanish basketball. Valencia is involved in three competitions.

== Players ==
Note: Flags indicate national team eligibility at FIBA-sanctioned events. Players may hold other non-FIBA nationalities not displayed.

Valencia Basket roster
Players
Coaches

| Pos. | No. | Nat. | Name | Ht. | Wt. | Age |
|---|---|---|---|---|---|---|
| G | 8 | (France) | Diot, Antoine | 1.93 m (6 ft 4 in) | 86 kg (190 lb) | 36 – 17 January 1989 |
| F/C | 14 | (Montenegro) | Dubljević, Bojan | 2.05 m (6 ft 9 in) | 111 kg (245 lb) | 34 – 24 October 1991 |
| F | 13 | (Serbia) | Lučić, Vladimir | 2.02 m (6 ft 8 in) | 91 kg (201 lb) | 36 – 17 June 1989 |
| C | 41 | (United States) | Hamilton, Justin | 2.13 m (7 ft 0 in) | 116 kg (256 lb) | 35 – 1 April 1990 |
| SG | 17 | (Spain) | Martínez, Rafa (C) | 1.86 m (6 ft 1 in) | 77 kg (170 lb) | 43 – 3 March 1982 |
| SF | 19 | (Spain) | San Emeterio, Fernando | 1.99 m (6 ft 6 in) | 105.4 kg (232 lb) | 41 – 1 January 1984 |
| G/F | 10 | (Central African Republic) | Sato, Romain | 1.95 m (6 ft 5 in) | 101 kg (223 lb) | 44 – 2 March 1981 |
| PF | 24 | (United States) | Shurna, John | 2.06 m (6 ft 9 in) | 100 kg (220 lb) | 35 – 30 April 1990 |
| PF | 43 | (United States) | Sikma, Luke | 2.03 m (6 ft 8 in) | 106 kg (234 lb) | 36 – 30 July 1989 |
| SG | 1 | (Iceland) | Stefánsson, Jón Arnór | 1.95 m (6 ft 5 in) | 92 kg (203 lb) | 43 – 21 September 1982 |
| PF | 4 | (Spain) | Trias, Jordi | 2.06 m (6 ft 9 in) | 109 kg (240 lb) | 45 – 5 November 1980 |
| PG | 9 | (Belgium) | van Rossom, Sam (injured) | 1.88 m (6 ft 2 in) | 85 kg (187 lb) | 39 – 3 June 1986 |
| PG | 16 | (Spain) | Vives, Guillem | 1.91 m (6 ft 3 in) | 85 kg (187 lb) | 32 – 16 September 1993 |

Head coach

- (Spain) Pedro Martínez

Assistant coach(es)

- (Spain) Carles Duran
- (Spain) Juan Maroto

Legend

- (C) Team captain
- Injured

- Roster
Updated: September 12, 2015

=== Players in ===
| No. | Pos. | Nat. | Name | Age | Moving from | | Type | Ends | Transfer fee | Date | Source |
|---|---|---|---|---|---|---|---|---|---|---|---|
| 43 | PF | (United States) | Luke Sikma | 25 | Iberostar Tenerife | (Spain) | Expired contract | 2 years | Free | June 29, 2015 | |
| 19 | SF | (Spain) | Fernando San Emeterio | 31 | Laboral Kutxa Baskonia | (Spain) | Expired contract | 2 years | Free | July 8, 2015 | |
| 8 | G | (France) | Antoine Diot | 26 | Strasbourg | (France) | Expired contract | 2 years | Free | July 10, 2015 | |
| 41 | C | (United States) | Justin Hamilton | 25 | Minnesota Timberwolves | (United States) | Expired contract | 1 year | Free | July 27, 2015 | |
| 24 | PF | (United States) | John Shurna | 25 | Darüşşafaka Doğuş | (Turkey) | Expired contract | 1 year | Free | July 27, 2015 | |
| 4 | PF | (Spain) | Jordi Trias | 34 | MoraBanc Andorra | (Spain) | Expired contract | 1 year | Free | September 6, 2015 | |
| 1 | SG | (Iceland) | Jón Arnór Stefánsson | 32 | Unicaja | (Spain) | Expired contract | 3 months | Free | September 12, 2015 | |
| | PF | (United States) | Travis Peterson | 31 | Avtodor Saratov | (Russia) | Expired contract | 1 month | Free | May 19, 2016 | |

Total spending: ▼€0

=== Players out ===
| No. | Pos. | Nat. | Name | Age | Moving to | | Type | Transfer fee | Date | Source |
|---|---|---|---|---|---|---|---|---|---|---|
| 34 | PF | (Spain) | Pablo Aguilar | 26 | Herbalife Gran Canaria | (Spain) | Expired contract | Free | June 16, 2015 | |
| 25 | F/C | (Croatia) | Krešimir Lončar | 32 | Alba Berlin | (Germany) | Expired contract | Free | June 16, 2015 | |
| 12 | F/C | (Ukraine) | Serhiy Lishchuk | 33 | UCAM Murcia | (Spain) | Expired contract | Free | June 22, 2015 | |
| 44 | PF | (United States) | Luke Harangody | 27 | Darüşşafaka Doğuş | (Turkey) | Expired contract | Free | June 22, 2015 | |
| 8 | G | (Serbia) | Nemanja Nedović | 24 | Unicaja | (Spain) | Termination of contract | – | July 2, 2015 | |
| 5 | G | (Spain) | Pau Ribas | 28 | FC Barcelona Lassa | (Spain) | Transfer | – | July 2, 2015 | |

Total income: ▲€0

Total expenditure: €0

== Club ==
=== Technical staff ===
| Position | Staff |
|---|---|
| Head Coach | Pedro Martínez |
| Assistant coach | Carles Durán; Juan Maroto |
| Team manager | Alfonso Castilla |
| Trainer | Pedro Cotolí |
| Doctor | Miquel Frasquet |
| Physiotherapist | Pablo Martínez; Josep Galán |
| Kit man | Paco Plaza |

Source: Valencia BC

=== Kit ===
Supplier: Luanvi

| Home | Away | Eurocup |

== Pre-season and friendlies ==
Win Loss

| 10 September 2015 1 | Valencia Basket | 64–66 | UCAM Murcia | Alcoi |
| 20:00 (CEST) | Scoring by quarter: 17–16, 15–11, 28–22, 4–17 |
| | Pts: Hamilton 14; Rebs: Hamilton 9 Asts: Martínez, Sikma 5 PIR: Hamilton 19 | Boxscore | Pts: Kelati 17; Rebs: Rojas 7 Asts: Cabezas 4 PIR: three players 14 | Arena: Pabellón Francisco Laporta; Referees: Calatrava, Castillo, Serrano |

| 13 September 2015 2 | Amics Castelló | 51–79 | Valencia Basket | Castellón |
| 12:30 (CEST) | Scoring by quarter: 19–28, 11–17, 8–16, 13–18 |
| | Pts: Garrett 12; Rebs: Blair, Garrett 7 Asts: Cabot, Faner 3 PIR: Garrett 16 | Boxscore | Pts: Dubljević 26; Rebs: Hamilton 10; Asts: Martínez 5 PIR: Dubljević 26 | Attendance: 2,000; Referees: Calatrava, Castillo, Serrano |

| 19 September 2015 3 | Valencia Basket | 73–71 | ICL Manresa | Godella |
| 20:00 (CEST) | Scoring by quarter: 24–13, 26–20, 13–9, 10–29 |
| | Pts: Hamilton 20; Rebs: Sikma 6 Asts: Stefánsson 2 PIR: Hamilton 24 | Boxscore | Pts: Grigonis 11; Rebs: Musli 9 Asts: Grigonis 4 PIR: Grigonis, Hernández 15 | Arena: Pabellón Municipal de Godella; Referees: Calatrava, Castillo, Planells |

| 26 September 2015 4 | Valencia Basket | 86–70 | Herbalife Gran Canaria | Burgos |
| | Scoring by quarter: 25–13, 17–26, 21–18, 23–13 |
| | Pts: Hamilton 18; Rebs: Hamilton 8 Asts: Van Rossom 7 PIR: Hamilton 21 | Boxscore | Pts: Báez 14; Rebs: Omić 5 Asts: Oliver 8 PIR: Rabaseda 12 | Arena: Coliseum de Burgos; Attendance: 800; Referees: Martínez, Martínez, Rial |

| 27 September 2015 5 | Dominion Bilbao Basket | 54–85 | Valencia Basket | Burgos |
| | Scoring by quarter: 20–18, 11–21, 11–20, 12–26 |
| | Pts: Ruoff 12; Rebs: James 6 Asts: Mumbrú 3 PIR: Bertāns 10 | Boxscore | Pts: Dubljević 22; Rebs: Sikma 6 Asts: three players 5 PIR: Sikma 26 | Arena: Coliseum de Burgos; Attendance: 1,500; Referees: Martínez Fernández, Sanchez Mohedas, Manuel |

| 1 October 2015 6 | CAI Zaragoza | 68–75 | Valencia Basket | Zaragoza |
| 21:00 (CEST) | Scoring by quarter: 16–14, 20–24, 13–22, 19–15 |
| | Pts: Jelovac 17; Rebs: Jelovac, Linhart 5 Asts: Bellas 4 PIR: Jelovac 19 | Boxscore | Pts: Hamilton 14; Rebs: Sikma 5 Asts: Sikma 3 PIR: Dubljević 17 | Arena: Pabellón José Luis Abós; Attendance: 6,385; Referees: Guirao, Oyón, Aliaga |

| 4 October 2015 7 | Valencia Basket | 100–77 | Iberostar Tenerife | Valencia |
| 20:00 (CEST) | Scoring by quarter: 27–13, 26–29, 29–11, 18–24 |
| | Pts: Hamilton 16; Rebs: Dubljević 5 Asts: Van Rossom 6 PIR: Hamilton 22 | Boxscore | Pts: O'Leary, Sekulić 11; Rebs: Rey 7 Asts: White 6 PIR: Sekulić 13 | Arena: Pabellón Fuente de San Luis; Attendance: 8,000; Referees: Martín Bertrán. Oyón, Mas Cadige |

== Competitions ==
=== Overall ===
| Competition | Started round | Current position / round | Final position / round | First match | Last match |
|---|---|---|---|---|---|
| Liga ACB | Matchday 1 | 1st | | 11 October 2015 | |
| Copa del Rey | Quarterfinals | — | Quarterfinalists | 18 February 2016 | |
| Eurocup | Regular season | — | 3rd / Last 32 | 13 October 2015 | 10 February 2016 |

Updated to match played February 18, 2016
Source: Competitions

=== Overview ===
| Competition | Record | | | | | | | |
| Competition | G | W | D | L | PF | PA | PD | Win % |
|---|---|---|---|---|---|---|---|---|
| Liga ACB | 20 | 19 | 0 | 1 | 1,674 | 1,444 | +230 | 95.00 |
| Copa del Rey | 1 | 0 | 0 | 1 | 78 | 83 | −5 | 0.00 |
| Eurocup | 16 | 13 | 0 | 3 | 1,283 | 1,151 | +132 | 81.25 |
| Total | 37 | 32 | 0 | 5 | 3,035 | 2,678 | +357 | 86.49 |

Updated to match played February 18, 2016
Source: Competitions

=== Liga ACB ===
==== League table ====
| Pos | Team | Pld | W | L | PF | PA | PD | Qualification or relegation |
|---|---|---|---|---|---|---|---|---|
| 1 | FC Barcelona Lassa | 34 | 29 | 5 | 2835 | 2384 | +451 | Qualification to playoffs |
| 2 | Real Madrid | 34 | 29 | 5 | 3229 | 2767 | +462 | Qualification to playoffs |
| 3 | Valencia Basket | 34 | 28 | 6 | 2831 | 2501 | +330 | Qualification to playoffs |
| 4 | Laboral Kutxa Baskonia | 34 | 24 | 10 | 2987 | 2703 | +284 | Qualification to playoffs |
| 5 | Herbalife Gran Canaria | 34 | 21 | 13 | 2818 | 2705 | +113 | Qualification to playoffs |

Source: ACB

==== Results summary ====
| Overall | | | | | | Home | | | | | Away | | | | |
| Pld | W | L | PF | PA | PD | W | L | PF | PA | PD | W | L | PF | PA | PD |
|---|---|---|---|---|---|---|---|---|---|---|---|---|---|---|---|
| 20 | 19 | 1 | 1674 | 1436 | +238 | 10 | 0 | 827 | 660 | +167 | 9 | 1 | 847 | 776 | +71 |

Last updated: February 14, 2016.
Source: Competitive matches

==== Results by round ====
| Round | 1 | 2 | 3 | 4 | 5 | 6 | 7 | 8 | 9 | 10 | 11 | 12 | 13 | 14 | 15 | 16 | 17 | 18 | 19 | 20 | 21 | 22 | 23 | 24 | 25 | 26 |
|---|---|---|---|---|---|---|---|---|---|---|---|---|---|---|---|---|---|---|---|---|---|---|---|---|---|---|
| Ground | A | H | A | H | H | A | H | H | A | H | A | H | A | H | A | H | A | H | A | A | H | A | H | H | A | H |
| Result | W | W | W | W | W | W | W | W | W | W | W | W | W | W | W | W | W | W | L | W | | | | | | |
| Position | 8 | 5 | 4 | 3 | 2 | 2 | 1 | 1 | 1 | 1 | 1 | 1 | 1 | 1 | 1 | 1 | 1 | 1 | 1 | 1 | | | | | | |

Updated to match(es) played on February 14, 2016. Source: Competitive matches
A = Away; H = Home; W = Win; D = Draw; L = Loss

==== Matches ====
Win Loss

| 11 October 2015 1 | Real Madrid | 82–88 | Valencia Basket | Madrid |
| 18:00 (CEST) | Scoring by quarter: 20–17, 17–28, 25–15, 20–28 |
| | Pts: Ayón 16; Rebs: Ayón 9 Asts: Llull 5 PIR: Ayón, Fernández 23 | Boxscore | Pts: Hamilton 24; Rebs: Hamilton 6 Asts: Sikma 7 PIR: Hamilton 26 | Arena: Barclaycard Center; Attendance: 10,543; Referees: Martín Bertrán, Cortés, Sanchez Mohedas |

| 18 October 2015 2 | Valencia Basket | 76–69 | FIATC Joventut | Valencia |
| 13:00 (CEST) | Scoring by quarter: 14–17, 20–11, 20–16, 22–25 |
| | Pts: Dubljević 20; Rebs: Dubljević, Sikma 8 Asts: Van Rossom 4 PIR: San Emeterio 23 | Boxscore | Pts: Paul 20; Rebs: Suton 11; Asts: Miralles, Suton 3 PIR: Suton 26 | Arena: Pabellón Fuente de San Luis; Attendance: 8,300; Referees: García González, Araña, Planells |

| 25 October 2015 3 | Movistar Estudiantes | 73–81 | Valencia Basket | Madrid |
| 13:00 (CET) | Scoring by quarter: 14–21, 14–24, 19–25, 26–11 |
| | Pts: Hernangómez, Martín 14; Rebs: Martín 8 Asts: Salgado 7 PIR: Hernangómez 25 | Boxscore | Pts: Martínez 21; Rebs: Dubljević 7 Asts: Vives 5 PIR: Martínez 17 | Arena: Barclaycard Center; Attendance: 6,542; Referees: Perea, Martínez, Aliaga |

| 31 October 2015 4 | Valencia Basket | 76–56 | Rio Natura Monbus Obradoiro | Valencia |
| 19:00 (CET) | Scoring by quarter: 16–5, 20–14, 20–17, 20–20 |
| | Pts: Hamilton 14; Rebs: San Emeterio 9 Asts: Vives 5 PIR: Sikma 16 | Boxscore | Pts: Yusta 15; Rebs: Caloiaro 7 Asts: Caloiaro 3 PIR: Yusta 16 | Arena: Pabellón Fuente de San Luis; Attendance: 7,800; Referees: Jiménez, Calatrava, Mas Cagide |

| 7 November 2015 5 | Valencia Basket | 85–78 | Laboral Kutxa Baskonia | Valencia |
| 19:30 (CET) | Scoring by quarter: 20–17, 24–20, 17–23, 24–18 |
| | Pts: Hamilton 20; Rebs: Dubljević 8 Asts: Van Rossom 7 PIR: Hamilton 22 | Boxscore | Pts: Adams 29; Rebs: Tillie 7 Asts: four players 2 PIR: Adams 16 | Arena: Fuente de San Luis; Attendance: 8,500; Referees: Pérez Pizarro, Bultó, Zamorano |

| 15 November 2015 6 | Dominion Bilbao Basket | 104–111(OT) | Valencia Basket | Bilbao |
| 18:00 (CET) | Scoring by quarter: 23–23, 18–16, 15–18, 29–28, Overtime: 19–26 |
| | Pts: Hannah 22; Rebs: James, Ruoff 6 Asts: Ruoff 5 PIR: Hannah 20 | Boxscore | Pts: Hamilton 31; Rebs: Hamilton 10; Asts: Martínez, Vives 4 PIR: Hamilton 39 | Arena: Bilbao Arena; Attendance: 9,183; Referees: Conde, Sánchez Monserrat, Serrano |

| 22 November 2015 7 | Valencia Basket | 92–65 | RETAbet.es GBC | Valencia |
| 13:00 (CET) | Scoring by quarter: 27–16, 29–14, 17–21, 19–14 |
| | Pts: Vives 15; Rebs: Sikma 7 Asts: Vives 9 PIR: Vives 23 | Boxscore | Pts: Urtasun 20; Rebs: four players 4 Asts: Lawrence 5 PIR: Urtasun 22 | Arena: Pabellón Fuente de San Luis; Attendance: 7,200; Referees: Pérez Pérez, Manuel, Cardús |

| 29 November 2015 8 | Valencia Basket | 86–61 | Herbalife Gran Canaria | Valencia |
| 19:30 (CET) | Scoring by quarter: 23–17, 22–20, 26–10, 15–14 |
| | Pts: Hamilton 16; Rebs: Sikma, Vives 7 Asts: Diot 3 PIR: Hamilton 23 | Boxscore | Pts: Pangos 15; Rebs: Omić, Paulí 6 Asts: Oliver 4 PIR: Omić 14 | Arena: Pabellón Fuente de San Luis; Attendance: 8,500; Referees: García González, Oyón, Fernández |

| 6 December 2015 9 | Baloncesto Sevilla | 67–81 | Valencia Basket | Sevilla |
| 13:00 (CET) | Scoring by quarter: 15–17, 13–13, 21–27, 18–24 |
| | Pts: Nachbar 14; Rebs: Balvin 7 Asts: Miljenović 4 PIR: Nachbar, Sánchez 13 | Boxscore | Pts: Martínez 22; Rebs: Sikma 9 Asts: Sikma 7 PIR: Martínez 24 | Arena: Palacio San Pablo; Attendance: 3,831; Referees: Perea, Calatrava, Caballero |

| 12 December 2015 10 | Valencia Basket | 100–84 | Montakit Fuenlabrada | Valencia |
| 19:00 (CET) | Scoring by quarter: 27–22, 31–28, 19–13, 23–21 |
| | Pts: Hamilton 20; Rebs: Sikma 7 Asts: Diot 8 PIR: Hamilton 24 | Boxscore | Pts: Popović 17; Rebs: Paunić, Urtasun 4 Asts: Tabu 6 PIR: Popović 18 | Arena: Pabellón Fuente de San Luis; Attendance: 8,000; Referees: Pérez Pizarro, Araña, Munar |

| 20 December 2015 11 | ICL Manresa | 62–74 | Valencia Basket | Manresa |
| 13:00 (CET) | Scoring by quarter: 15–23, 17–18, 18–21, 12–12 |
| | Pts: Simon 18; Rebs: Musli 11; Asts: Hernández 4 PIR: Musli, Simon 19 | Boxscore | Pts: Hamilton 19; Rebs: Dubljević 9 Asts: Diot, Vives 4 PIR: Dubljević 21 | Arena: Nou Congost; Attendance: 4,500; Referees: Hierrezuelo, Pérez Nin, Mas |

| 22 December 2015 12 | Valencia Basket | 65–54 | UCAM Murcia | Valencia |
| 19:30 (CET) | Scoring by quarter: 15–16, 23–13, 17–13, 10–12 |
| | Pts: Sikma 12; Rebs: San Emeterio 11; Asts: Vives 5 PIR: Vives 16 | Boxscore | Pts: Kelati 14; Rebs: Lima, Wood 4 Asts: Campazzo 6 PIR: Kelati 10 | Arena: Pabellón Fuente de San Luis; Attendance: 8,200; Referees: Peruga, Cortés, Sacristán |

| 27 December 2015 13 | Iberostar Tenerife | 82–86 | Valencia Basket | San Cristóbal de La Laguna |
| 13:00 (CET) | Scoring by quarter: 18–21, 17–21, 17–22, 30–22 |
| | Pts: Beirán 18; Rebs: Beirán 6 Asts: Richotti 7 PIR: Beirán, Richotti 22 | Boxscore | Pts: Dubljević 16; Rebs: Sikma 6 Asts: Sikma 5 PIR: Martínez 17 | Arena: Santiago Martín; Attendance: 4,189; Referees: Martín Bertrán, Castillo, Aliaga |

| 3 January 2016 14 | Valencia Basket | 81–70 | Unicaja | Valencia |
| 19:30 (CET) | Scoring by quarter: 22–17, 24–18, 16–16, 19–19 |
| | Pts: San Emeterio 17; Rebs: Hamilton 5 Asts: Vives 8 PIR: San Emeterio 24 | Boxscore | Pts: Smith 24; Rebs: Hendrix 8 Asts: Nedović 3 PIR: Smith 24 | Arena: Pabellón Fuente de San Luis; Attendance: 8,500; Referees: Jiménez Trujillo, Bultó, Fernández |

| 10 January 2016 15 | MoraBanc Andorra | 78–86 | Valencia Basket | Andorra la Vella |
| 19:30 (CET) | Scoring by quarter: 20–23, 24–21, 18–18, 16–24 |
| | Pts: Bogdanović 16; Rebs: Shermadini 5 Asts: Sada 6 PIR: three players 18 | Boxscore | Pts: Dubljević 17; Rebs: Dubljević 6 Asts: Martínez, Vives 4 PIR: Dubljević 21 | Arena: Poliesportiu d'Andorra; Attendance: 4,250; Referees: Pérez Pérez, Sánchez Montserrat, Cardús |

| 17 January 2016 16 | Valencia Basket | 81–74 | CAI Zaragoza | Valencia |
| 13:00 (CET) | Scoring by quarter: 21–21, 28–24, 20–16, 12–13 |
| | Pts: Dubljević 19; Rebs: Dubljević, Sikma 7 Asts: Vives 5 PIR: Dubljević 23 | Boxscore | Pts: Linhart 13; Rebs: Fotu 6 Asts: Linhart, Sastre 3 PIR: Fotu 16 | Arena: Fuente de San Luis; Attendance: 8,500; Referees: Perea, Peruga, Sanchez Mohedas |

| 24 January 2016 17 | FC Barcelona Lassa | 91–94(OT) | Valencia Basket | Barcelona |
| 12:30 (CET) | Scoring by quarter: 21–23, 22–12, 13–22, 26–25, Overtime: 9–12 |
| | Pts: Doellman, Satoranský 17; Rebs: Lawal 7 Asts: Satoranský 12; PIR: Satoranský 24 | Boxscore | Pts: Dubljević 16; Rebs: Sikma 11; Asts: Sikma 6 PIR: San Emeterio 26 | Arena: Palau Blaugrana; Attendance: 6,545; Referees: Conde, Cortés, Rial |

| 31 January 2016 18 | Valencia Basket | 85–49 | Dominion Bilbao Basket | Valencia |
| 19:30 (CET) | Scoring by quarter: 26–10, 17–8, 23–18, 19–13 |
| | Pts: Vives 17; Rebs: Hamilton 6 Asts: Diot 3 PIR: Vives 22 | Boxscore | Pts: Hannah 12; Rebs: Bogris 7 Asts: Hannah 4 PIR: Bogris 16 | Arena: Fuente de San Luis; Attendance: 8,500; Referees: Pérez Pérez, Guirao, Martínez Díez |

| 7 February 2016 19 | Laboral Kutxa Baskonia | 79–73 | Valencia Basket | Vitoria-Gasteiz |
| 19:00 (CET) | Scoring by quarter: 21–17, 13–18, 23–11, 22–27 |
| | Pts: Adams 21; Rebs: Bourousis 11; Asts: Adams 4 PIR: Bourousis 21 | Boxscore | Pts: Hamilton 27; Rebs: Dubljević 9 Asts: Sikma 7 PIR: Hamilton 28 | Arena: Fernando Buesa Arena; Attendance: 13,059; Referees: Jiménez Trujillo, García Ortiz, Fernández |

| 14 February 2016 20 | FIATC Joventut | 66–73 | Valencia Basket | Badalona |
| 18:00 (CET) | Scoring by quarter: 12–10, 19–20, 17–25, 18–18 |
| | Pts: Suton 16; Rebs: Raković 4 Asts: Vidal 6 PIR: Paul 16 | Boxscore | Pts: Hamilton 19; Rebs: Dubljević 11; Asts: Diot 5 PIR: Dubljević 23 | Arena: Palau Olímpic; Attendance: 5,414; Referees: Arteaga, Castillo, Caballero |

| 28 February 2016 21 | Valencia Basket | vs. | Real Madrid | Valencia |
| 18:00 (CET) |
| | | Boxscore | | Arena: Fuente de San Luis |

| 6 March 2016 22 | Montakit Fuenlabrada | vs. | Valencia Basket | Fuenlabrada |
| 12:30 (CET) |
| | | Boxscore | | Arena: Fernando Martin |

| 13 March 2016 23 | Valencia Basket | vs. | ICL Manresa | Valencia |
| 12:30 (CET) |
| | | Boxscore | | Arena: Fuente de San Luis |

| 20 March 2016 24 | Valencia Basket | vs. | Movistar Estudiantes | Valencia |
| 12:30 (CET) |
| | | Boxscore | | Arena: Fuente de San Luis |

| 27 March 2016 25 | Rio Natura Monbus Obradoiro | vs. | Valencia Basket | Santiago de Compostela |
| 12:30 (CEST) |
| | | Boxscore | | Arena: Multiusos Fontes do Sar |

| 3 April 2016 26 | Valencia Basket | vs. | Baloncesto Sevilla | Valencia |
| 12:30 (CEST) |
| | | Boxscore | | Arena: Fuente de San Luis |

==== Results overview ====
Win Draw Loss

| Opposition | Home score | Away score | Double |
|---|---|---|---|
| Baloncesto Sevilla | | 67–81 | |
| CAI Zaragoza | 81–74 | | |
| Dominion Bilbao Basket | 85–49 | 104–111 | 196–153 |
| FC Barcelona Lassa | | 91–94 | |
| FIATC Joventut | 76–69 | 66–73 | 149–135 |
| Herbalife Gran Canaria | 86–61 | | |
| Iberostar Tenerife | | 82–86 | |
| ICL Manresa | | 62–74 | |
| Laboral Kutxa Baskonia | 85–78 | 79–73 | 158–157 |
| Montakit Fuenlabrada | 100–84 | | |
| MoraBanc Andorra | | 78–86 | |
| Movistar Estudiantes | | 73–81 | |
| Real Madrid | | 82–88 | |
| RETAbet.es GBC | 92–65 | | |
| Rio Natura Monbus Obradoiro | 76–56 | | |
| UCAM Murcia | 65–54 | | |
| Unicaja | 81–70 | | |

=== Eurocup ===
==== Regular season ====
| Pos | Team | Pld | W | L | PF | PA | PD | Qualification |
|---|---|---|---|---|---|---|---|---|
| 1 | (Spain) Valencia Basket | 10 | 10 | 0 | 809 | 689 | +120 | Advance to Last 32 |
| 2 | (Spain) CAI Zaragoza | 10 | 7 | 3 | 760 | 757 | +3 | Advance to Last 32 |
| 3 | (Germany) ratiopharm Ulm | 10 | 4 | 6 | 804 | 792 | +12 | Advance to Last 32 |
| 4 | (Italy) Umana Reyer Venezia | 10 | 4 | 6 | 721 | 760 | −39 | Advance to Last 32 |
| 5 | (Belgium) Proximus Spirou | 10 | 3 | 7 | 731 | 782 | −51 | |
| 6 | (France) SLUC Nancy | 10 | 2 | 8 | 714 | 759 | −45 | |

Source: Eurocup Basketball

Win Loss

| 13 October 2015 1 | SLUC Nancy (France) | 71–74 | (Spain) Valencia Basket | Nancy, France |
| 19:30 (CEST) | Scoring by quarter: 17–18, 16–18, 22–18, 16–20 |
| | Pts: Sene, Panko 13; Rebs: McCrea 11; Asts: Sene 5 PIR: Sene, Tucker 11 | Boxscore | Pts: Dubljević 13; Rebs: Sikma 7 Asts: Stefánsson 4 PIR: Sikma 18 | Arena: Palais des Sports Jean Weille; Attendance: 3,056 (Tentative); Referees: Srdan Dozai (CRO), Nick Van Den Broeck (BEL), Mario Majkic (SLO) |

| 20 October 2015 2 | Valencia Basket (Spain) | 87–68 | (Spain) CAI Zaragoza | Valencia, Spain |
| 21:00 (CEST) | Scoring by quarter: 21–20, 27–11, 25–19, 14–18 |
| | Pts: Dubljević 24; Rebs: Dubljević 5 Asts: Van Rossom, Vives 5 PIR: Dubljević 24 | Boxscore | Pts: Jelovac 20; Rebs: Sastre 7 Asts: Bellas, Diener 5 PIR: Jelovac 21 | Arena: Pabellón Fuente de San Luis; Attendance: 6,900 (Tentative); Referees: Recep Ankaralı (TUR), Aare Halliko (EST), Clemens Fritz (GER) |

| 27 October 2015 3 | ratiopharm Ulm (Germany) | 79–82 | (Spain) Valencia Basket | Ulm, Germany |
| 19:30 (CET) | Scoring by quarter: 25–15, 27–22, 15–25, 12–20 |
| | Pts: Rubit 17; Rebs: three players 5 Asts: Günther 5 PIR: Rubit 23 | Boxscore | Pts: Vives 21; Rebs: Hamilton 9 Asts: Vives 9 PIR: Vives 31 | Arena: ratiopharm Arena; Attendance: 4,500 (Tentative); Referees: Nicola Maestre (FRA), Renaud Geller (BEL), David Romano (ISR) |

| 3 November 2015 4 | Valencia Basket (Spain) | 88–59 | (Italy) Umana Reyer Venezia | Valencia, Spain |
| 20:30 (CET) | Scoring by quarter: 23-16, 17-16, 21-13, 27-14 |
| | Pts: Martínez 16; Rebs: Sikma 9 Asts: Vives 9 PIR: Sikma 22 | Boxscore | Pts: Goss 14; Rebs: Jackson 5 Asts: Goss, Green 3 PIR: Goss 16 | Arena: Pabellón Fuente de San Luis; Attendance: 7,200; Referees: Elias Koromilas (GRE), Jakub Zamojski (POL), Aleksandar Glišić (SRB) |

| 11 November 2015 5 | Proximus Spirou (Belgium) | 49–65 | (Spain) Valencia Basket | Charleroi, Belgium |
| 20:30 (CET) | Scoring by quarter: 14–20, 14–13, 10–14, 11–18 |
| | Pts: B. Baron 14; Rebs: Tumba 12; Asts: six players 1 PIR: Tumba 15 | Boxscore | Pts: Hamilton 17; Rebs: Trias 8 Asts: San Emeterio 3 PIR: Hamilton 15 | Arena: RTL Spiroudome; Attendance: 2,000; Referees: Petros Papapetrou (GRE), Alessandro Martolini (ITA), Mario Majkič (SLO) |

| 18 November 2015 6 | Valencia Basket (Spain) | 77–65 | (France) SLUC Nancy | Valencia, Spain |
| 20:30 (CET) | Scoring by quarter: 14–11, 16–24, 16–11, 31–19 |
| | Pts: Van Rossom 17; Rebs: Sikma 8 Asts: San Emeterio 5 PIR: Hamilton 25 | Boxscore | Pts: Bell 17; Rebs: Panko, Piétrus 9 Asts: Kitchen 6 PIR: Bell 18 | Arena: Pabellón Fuente de San Luis; Attendance: 6,800; Referees: Anastasios Piloïdis (GRE), Murat Biricik (TUR), Luis Lopes (POR) |

| 24 November 2015 7 | CAI Zaragoza (Spain) | 76–84 | (Spain) Valencia Basket | Zaragoza, Spain |
| 20:30 (CET) | Scoring by quarter: 22–26, 18–24, 20–20, 16–14 |
| | Pts: Kanacević, Norel 13; Rebs: Norel 6 Asts: Bellas 7 PIR: Norel 17 | Boxscore | Pts: Hamilton 20; Rebs: Hamilton 9 Asts: Vives 5 PIR: Hamilton 27 | Arena: Pabellón José Luis Abós; Attendance: 4,627; Referees: Tomasz Trawicki (POL), Igor Mitrovski (MKD), Regis Bardera (FRA) |

| 2 December 2015 8 | Valencia Basket (Spain) | 93–88 | (Germany) ratiopharm Ulm | Valencia, Spain |
| 20:30 (CET) | Scoring by quarter: 21–15, 24–28, 24–24, 24–21 |
| | Pts: Vives 18; Rebs: Hamilton 9 Asts: Stefánsson 5 PIR: Vives 19 | Boxscore | Pts: Morgan 19; Rebs: Morgan 7 Asts: Günther 7 PIR: Morgan 23 | Arena: Pabellón Fuente de San Luis; Attendance: 6,300; Referees: Joseph Bissang (FRA), Ingus Baumanis (LAT), Ilya Putenko (RUS) |

| 9 December 2015 9 | Umana Reyer Venezia (Italy) | 58–62 | (Spain) Valencia Basket | Venice, Italy |
| 20:30 (CET) | Scoring by quarter: 9–19, 17–14, 18–12, 14–17 |
| | Pts: Goss 12; Rebs: Ortner 7 Asts: Goss 3 PIR: Goss 12 | Boxscore | Pts: Dubljević 16; Rebs: Dubljević 8 Asts: six players 2 PIR: Dubljević 21 | Arena: PalaTaliercio; Attendance: 2,700; Referees: Petar Obradović (BIH), Moritz Reite (GER), Tomislav Vovk (CRO) |

| 16 December 2015 10 | Valencia Basket (Spain) | 97–76 | (Belgium) Proximus Spirou | Valencia, Spain |
| 20:30 (CET) | Scoring by quarter: 31–25, 15–21, 28–8, 23–22 |
| | Pts: Dubljević 20; Rebs: Dubljević, San Emeterio 5 Asts: Stefánsson 6 PIR: Dubljević 27 | Boxscore | Pts: Gaudoux 16; Rebs: Tumba 11; Asts: B. Baron 4 PIR: Tumba 16 | Arena: Pabellón Fuente de San Luis; Attendance: 6,800; Referees: Recep Ankaralı (TUR), Haris Bijedić (BIH), Jean-Charles Collin (FRA) |

==== Last 32 ====
| Pos | Team | Pld | W | L | PF | PA | PD | Qualification |
|---|---|---|---|---|---|---|---|---|
| 1 | (Germany) EWE Baskets Oldenburg | 6 | 4 | 2 | 494 | 490 | +4 | Advance to Eighthfinals |
| 2 | (France) Limoges CSP | 6 | 3 | 3 | 494 | 467 | +27 | Advance to Eighthfinals |
| 3 | (Spain) Valencia Basket | 6 | 3 | 3 | 474 | 462 | +12 | |
| 4 | (Greece) PAOK | 6 | 2 | 4 | 425 | 468 | −43 | |

Source: Eurocup Basketball

Win Loss

| 6 January 2016 1 | Valencia Basket (Spain) | 78–62 | (Greece) PAOK | Valencia, Spain |
| 19:00 (CET) | Scoring by quarter: 21–18, 13–11, 24–18, 20–15 |
| | Pts: Dubljević 12; Rebs: Sikma 10; Asts: Vives 5 PIR: Sikma 18 | Boxscore | Pts: Duvnjak 14; Rebs: three players 4 Asts: Schortsanitis 4 PIR: Duvnjak 14 | Arena: Pabellón Fuente de San Luis; Attendance: 8,000; Referees: Milija Vojinović (SRB), Tomasz Trawicki (POL), Nick Van Den Broeck (BEL) |

| 13 January 2016 2 | EWE Baskets (Germany) | 89–108 | (Spain) Valencia Basket | Oldenburg, Germany |
| 20:00 (CET) | Scoring by quarter: 26–26, 20–28, 21–31, 22–23 |
| | Pts: Qvale 16; Rebs: three players 5 Asts: Kramer 6 PIR: Prepelič 17 | Boxscore | Pts: Diot 25; Rebs: three players 5 Asts: Diot 8 PIR: Diot 32 | Arena: Kleine EWE Arena; Attendance: 2,037; Referees: Marek Ćmikiewicz (POL), Igor Dragojević (MNE), Alexey Davydov (RUS) |

| 19 January 2016 3 | Valencia Basket (Spain) | 72–92 | (France) Limoges | Valencia, Spain |
| 20:45 (CET) | Scoring by quarter: 15–21, 29–23, 14–21, 14–27 |
| | Pts: Dubljević 16; Rebs: Hamilton 8 Asts: Shurna 4 PIR: Dubljević 17 | Boxscore | Pts: Boungou Colo 23; Rebs: Payne 5 Asts: McCalebb 6 PIR: Boungou Colo 22 | Arena: Pabellón Fuente de San Luis; Attendance: 7,800; Referees: Tolga Sahin (ITA), Aleksandar Glišić (SRB), Murat Biricik (TUR) |

| 26 January 2016 4 | Limoges (France) | 82–67 | (Spain) Valencia Basket | Limoges, France |
| 20:40 (CET) | Scoring by quarter: 18–23, 21–9, 23–18, 20–17 |
| | Pts: McCalebb 15; Rebs: Daniels 7 Asts: Westermann 7 PIR: Boungou Colo 18 | Boxscore | Pts: Martínez 17; Rebs: Shurna, Sikma 7 Asts: San Emeterio 4 PIR: Martínez 22 | Arena: Beaublanc; Attendance: 5,000; Referees: Petri Mäntylä (FIN), Renaud Geller (BEL), Ilya Putenko (RUS) |

| 3 February 2016 5 | PAOK (Greece) | 75–72 | (Spain) Valencia Basket | Thessaloniki, Greece |
| 18:00 (CET) | Scoring by quarter: 19–19, 20–14, 19–22, 17–17 |
| | Pts: Hatcher 18; Rebs: Marković, Tepić 7 Asts: Hatcher 4 PIR: Hatcher 19 | Boxscore | Pts: Vives 19; Rebs: Sikma 8 Asts: Sikma 5 PIR: Vives 24 | Arena: PAOK Sports Arena; Attendance: 852; Referees: Milija Vojinović (SRB), Tomislav Hordov (CRO), Igor Mitrovski (MKD) |

| 10 February 2016 6 | Valencia Basket (Spain) | 77–62 | (Germany) EWE Baskets | Valencia, Spain |
| 20:40 (CET) | Scoring by quarter: 23–20, 17–15, 26–14, 11–13 |
| | Pts: Hamilton 16; Rebs: Shurna 8 Asts: Vives 5 PIR: Shurna 25 | Boxscore | Pts: Paulding 20; Rebs: Qvale 7 Asts: Prepelič 4 PIR: Paulding 21 | Arena: Pabellón Fuente de San Luis; Attendance: 7,800; Referees: Anastasios Piloidis (GRE), Marko Juras (SRB), Erşan Kartal (TUR) |

=== Copa del Rey ===
Win Loss

| 18 February 2016 Quarterfinals | Valencia Basket | 78–83 | Herbalife Gran Canaria | A Coruña |
| 21:30 (CET) | Scoring by quarter: 26–16, 16–26, 23–15, 13–25 |
| | Pts: San Emeterio 17; Rebs: Hamilton 10; Asts: Hamilton, Vives 3 PIR: San Emeterio 17 | Boxscore | Pts: Aguilar 16; Rebs: Omić 9 Asts: Pangos 8 PIR: Aguilar 18 | Arena: Coliseum; Attendance: 9,156; Referees: García González, Pérez Pérez, Cortés |

== Statistics ==
Legend
| GP | Games played | GS | Games started | MPG | Minutes per game |
| FG% | Field-goal percentage | 3FG% | 3-point field-goal percentage | FT% | Free-throw percentage |
| RPG | Rebounds per game | APG | Assists per game | SPG | Steals per game |
| BPG | Blocks per game | PPG | Points per game | PIR | PIR per game |

=== Liga ACB ===
| Player | GP | GS | MPG | FG% | 3FG% | FT% | RPG | APG | SPG | BPG | PPG | EFF |
|---|---|---|---|---|---|---|---|---|---|---|---|---|
| Antoine Diot | 0 | 0 | 0.0 | .000 | .000 | .000 | 0.0 | 0.0 | 0.0 | 0.0 | 0.0 | 0.0 |
| Bojan Dubljević | 0 | 0 | 0.0 | .000 | .000 | .000 | 0.0 | 0.0 | 0.0 | 0.0 | 0.0 | 0.0 |
| Justin Hamilton | 0 | 0 | 0.0 | .000 | .000 | .000 | 0.0 | 0.0 | 0.0 | 0.0 | 0.0 | 0.0 |
| Vladimir Lučić | 0 | 0 | 0.0 | .000 | .000 | .000 | 0.0 | 0.0 | 0.0 | 0.0 | 0.0 | 0.0 |
| Rafa Martínez | 0 | 0 | 0.0 | .000 | .000 | .000 | 0.0 | 0.0 | 0.0 | 0.0 | 0.0 | 0.0 |
| Fernando San Emeterio | 0 | 0 | 0.0 | .000 | .000 | .000 | 0.0 | 0.0 | 0.0 | 0.0 | 0.0 | 0.0 |
| Romain Sato | 0 | 0 | 0.0 | .000 | .000 | .000 | 0.0 | 0.0 | 0.0 | 0.0 | 0.0 | 0.0 |
| John Shurna | 0 | 0 | 0.0 | .000 | .000 | .000 | 0.0 | 0.0 | 0.0 | 0.0 | 0.0 | 0.0 |
| Luke Sikma | 0 | 0 | 0.0 | .000 | .000 | .000 | 0.0 | 0.0 | 0.0 | 0.0 | 0.0 | 0.0 |
| Jón Arnór Stefánsson | 0 | 0 | 0.0 | .000 | .000 | .000 | 0.0 | 0.0 | 0.0 | 0.0 | 0.0 | 0.0 |
| Jordi Trias | 0 | 0 | 0.0 | .000 | .000 | .000 | 0.0 | 0.0 | 0.0 | 0.0 | 0.0 | 0.0 |
| Sam Van Rossom | 0 | 0 | 0.0 | .000 | .000 | .000 | 0.0 | 0.0 | 0.0 | 0.0 | 0.0 | 0.0 |
| Guillem Vives | 0 | 0 | 0.0 | .000 | .000 | .000 | 0.0 | 0.0 | 0.0 | 0.0 | 0.0 | 0.0 |

=== Copa del Rey ===
| Player | GP | GS | MPG | FG% | 3FG% | FT% | RPG | APG | SPG | BPG | PPG | EFF |
|---|---|---|---|---|---|---|---|---|---|---|---|---|
| Antoine Diot | 0 | 0 | 0.0 | .000 | .000 | .000 | 0.0 | 0.0 | 0.0 | 0.0 | 0.0 | 0.0 |
| Bojan Dubljević | 0 | 0 | 0.0 | .000 | .000 | .000 | 0.0 | 0.0 | 0.0 | 0.0 | 0.0 | 0.0 |
| Justin Hamilton | 0 | 0 | 0.0 | .000 | .000 | .000 | 0.0 | 0.0 | 0.0 | 0.0 | 0.0 | 0.0 |
| Vladimir Lučić | 0 | 0 | 0.0 | .000 | .000 | .000 | 0.0 | 0.0 | 0.0 | 0.0 | 0.0 | 0.0 |
| Rafa Martínez | 0 | 0 | 0.0 | .000 | .000 | .000 | 0.0 | 0.0 | 0.0 | 0.0 | 0.0 | 0.0 |
| Fernando San Emeterio | 0 | 0 | 0.0 | .000 | .000 | .000 | 0.0 | 0.0 | 0.0 | 0.0 | 0.0 | 0.0 |
| Romain Sato | 0 | 0 | 0.0 | .000 | .000 | .000 | 0.0 | 0.0 | 0.0 | 0.0 | 0.0 | 0.0 |
| John Shurna | 0 | 0 | 0.0 | .000 | .000 | .000 | 0.0 | 0.0 | 0.0 | 0.0 | 0.0 | 0.0 |
| Luke Sikma | 0 | 0 | 0.0 | .000 | .000 | .000 | 0.0 | 0.0 | 0.0 | 0.0 | 0.0 | 0.0 |
| Jón Arnór Stefánsson | 0 | 0 | 0.0 | .000 | .000 | .000 | 0.0 | 0.0 | 0.0 | 0.0 | 0.0 | 0.0 |
| Jordi Trias | 0 | 0 | 0.0 | .000 | .000 | .000 | 0.0 | 0.0 | 0.0 | 0.0 | 0.0 | 0.0 |
| Guillem Vives | 0 | 0 | 0.0 | .000 | .000 | .000 | 0.0 | 0.0 | 0.0 | 0.0 | 0.0 | 0.0 |

=== Eurocup ===
| Player | GP | GS | MPG | FG% | 3FG% | FT% | RPG | APG | SPG | BPG | PPG | EFF |
|---|---|---|---|---|---|---|---|---|---|---|---|---|
| Antoine Diot | 0 | 0 | 0.0 | .000 | .000 | .000 | 0.0 | 0.0 | 0.0 | 0.0 | 0.0 | 0.0 |
| Bojan Dubljević | 0 | 0 | 0.0 | .000 | .000 | .000 | 0.0 | 0.0 | 0.0 | 0.0 | 0.0 | 0.0 |
| Justin Hamilton | 0 | 0 | 0.0 | .000 | .000 | .000 | 0.0 | 0.0 | 0.0 | 0.0 | 0.0 | 0.0 |
| Vladimir Lučić | 0 | 0 | 0.0 | .000 | .000 | .000 | 0.0 | 0.0 | 0.0 | 0.0 | 0.0 | 0.0 |
| Rafa Martínez | 0 | 0 | 0.0 | .000 | .000 | .000 | 0.0 | 0.0 | 0.0 | 0.0 | 0.0 | 0.0 |
| Josep Puerto | 0 | 0 | 0.0 | .000 | .000 | .000 | 0.0 | 0.0 | 0.0 | 0.0 | 0.0 | 0.0 |
| Fernando San Emeterio | 0 | 0 | 0.0 | .000 | .000 | .000 | 0.0 | 0.0 | 0.0 | 0.0 | 0.0 | 0.0 |
| Romain Sato | 0 | 0 | 0.0 | .000 | .000 | .000 | 0.0 | 0.0 | 0.0 | 0.0 | 0.0 | 0.0 |
| John Shurna | 0 | 0 | 0.0 | .000 | .000 | .000 | 0.0 | 0.0 | 0.0 | 0.0 | 0.0 | 0.0 |
| Luke Sikma | 0 | 0 | 0.0 | .000 | .000 | .000 | 0.0 | 0.0 | 0.0 | 0.0 | 0.0 | 0.0 |
| Jón Arnór Stefánsson | 0 | 0 | 0.0 | .000 | .000 | .000 | 0.0 | 0.0 | 0.0 | 0.0 | 0.0 | 0.0 |
| Jordi Trias | 0 | 0 | 0.0 | .000 | .000 | .000 | 0.0 | 0.0 | 0.0 | 0.0 | 0.0 | 0.0 |
| Sam Van Rossom | 0 | 0 | 0.0 | .000 | .000 | .000 | 0.0 | 0.0 | 0.0 | 0.0 | 0.0 | 0.0 |
| Guillem Vives | 0 | 0 | 0.0 | .000 | .000 | .000 | 0.0 | 0.0 | 0.0 | 0.0 | 0.0 | 0.0 |
