= Ruslan Otverchenko =

Ukrainian basketball player (1990–2023)

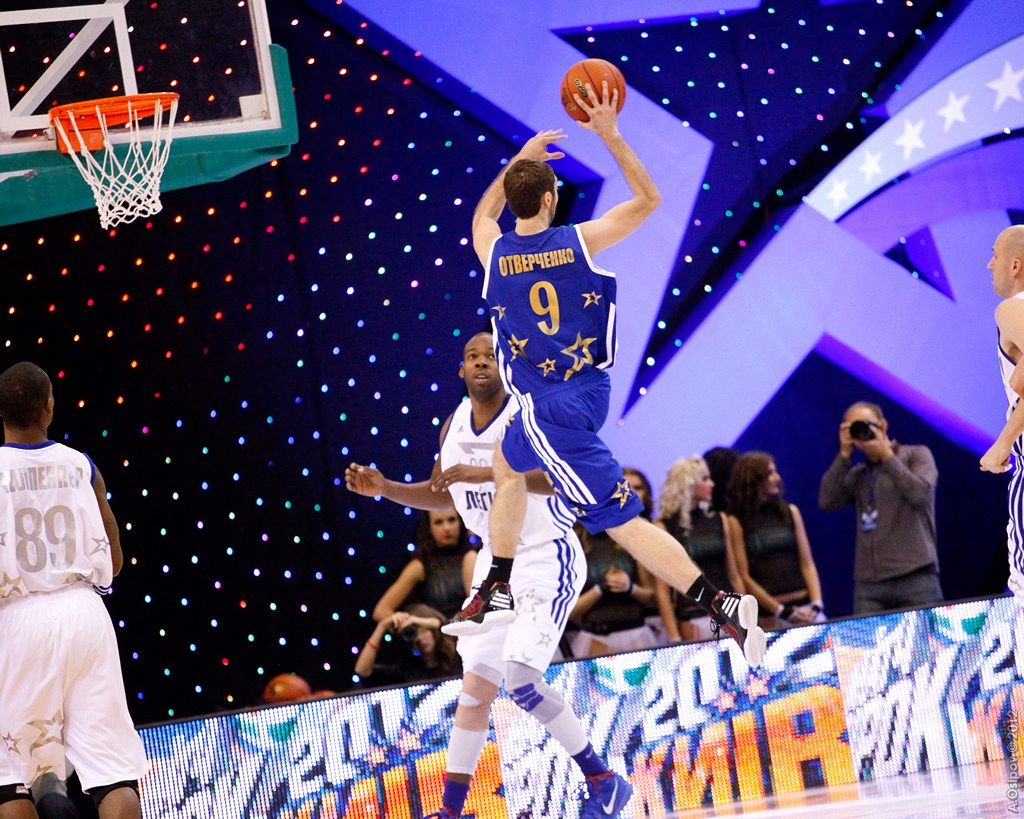
- Otverchenko in 2012

Personal information
- Born: 6 January 1990 Ulaanbaatar, Mongolia
- Died: 15 January 2023 (aged 33) Kyiv, Ukraine
- Listed height: 6 ft 4 in (1.93 m)
- Listed weight: 180 lb (82 kg)

Career information
- NBA draft: 2012: undrafted
- Position: Shooting guard
- Number: 9, 77

Career history
- 2012–2015: BC Kyiv
- 2012–2013: →Donetsk
- 2015–2016: Manresa
- 2016–2018: Budivelnyk
- 2018–2019: Cherkaski Mavpy
- 2019: Kyiv-Basket
- 2019–2020: Prometey
- 2020–2023: Budivelnyk

Ruslan Otverchenko (Ukrainian: Руслан Отверченко; 6 January 1990 – 15 January 2023) was a Ukrainian basketball player for SC Prometey and the Ukrainian National Team.

Otverchenko played the majority of his career in Ukraine, with exception of one season in Spain with Bàsquet Manresa. He participated at the EuroBasket 2017.

Otverchenko died from heart complications in Kyiv on 15 January 2023, at the age of 33.

== See also ==
- List of basketball players who died during their careers
