= Javier Beirán =

Spanish basketball player

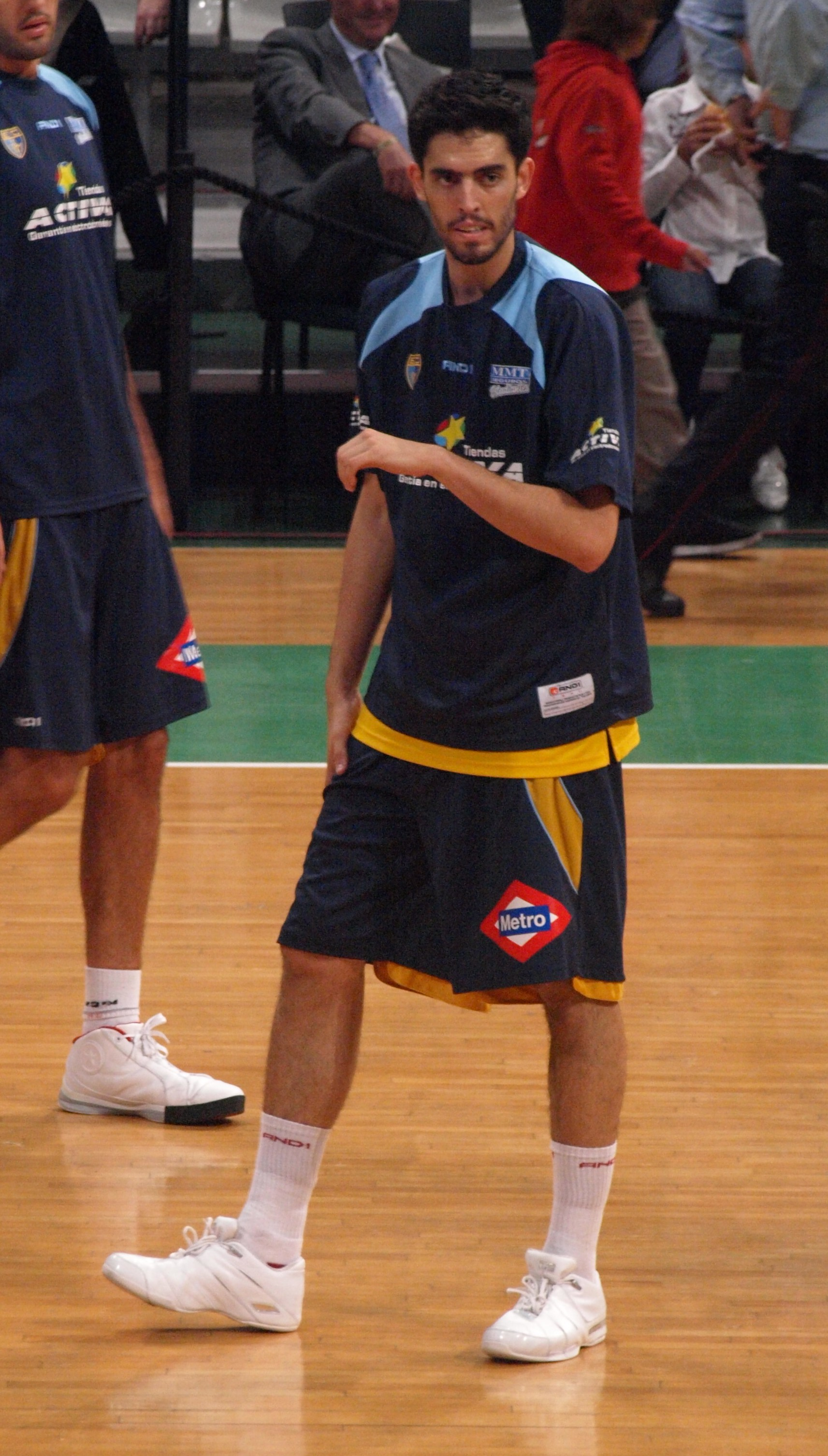
- Beirán playing for Estudiantes in the 2008–09 season

Personal information
- Born: 22 May 1987 (age 39) Madrid, Spain
- Listed height: 200 cm (6 ft 7 in)

Career information
- NBA draft: 2009: undrafted
- Playing career: 2005–2023
- Position: Small forward

Career history
- 2005–2010: Estudiantes
- 2010–2014: Gran Canaria
- 2014–2019: Canarias
- 2019–2021: Gran Canaria
- 2021-2022: Estudiantes
- 2022-2023: Fuenlabrada
- 2023: Saint-Quentin BB

Career highlights
- Champions League champion (2017); FIBA Intercontinental Cup champion (2017)
Medals
Men's basketball
Representing Spain
World Cup
Gold medal – first place	2019 China
U20 European Championship
Silver medal – second place	2007 Italy/Slovenia	Spain U20

Javier Beirán Amigo (born 22 May 1987) is a Spanish former professional basketball player. Beirán usually played as small forward.

== Professional career ==
After playing for six years in the younger age categories at Real Madrid, Beirán joined MMT Estudiantes where he played for 5 seasons. In 2007, he was part of the Spanish national team which won silver in the Under 20 European Championship.

Following on from his early career successes, he went on to join Gran Canaria in 2010, where he spent 4 years before moving over to Canarias, winning the Basketball Champions League in 2017.

On 28 June 2019 Beirán returned to Herbalife Gran Canaria where he played as captain.

After 11 years playing in the Canary Islands, in August 2021 he signed with CB Estudiantes with the aim of winning the LEB Oro League in the 2021-2022 season.

On 27 September 2022, he returned to the Spanish Liga Endesa with Carplus Fuenlabrada.

On 9 February 2023, he confirmed his first international experience when he signed with Saint-Quentin BB of the French LNB Pro B and was an integral part of the teams' success in winning the league and obtaining their promotion to the LNB Pro A.

== International career ==
Beirán played for the U20 Spain national team and was part of the 2019 World Cup Winning team in China.

== Personal life ==
Javier Beirán is son of José Manuel Beirán, a basketball player who won the silver medal at the 1984 Summer Olympics and the 1979–80 FIBA European Champions Cup with Real Madrid.

He has a degree in Business Management from the Universidad Autónoma de Madrid and a second degree in Journalism from Universidad de La Laguna.

Beirán also runs one of the largest basketball camps in Spain, Campus Javi Beirán which takes place in La Gomera and Tenerife, with approximately 1,000 kids attending every summer.
