= Chase Simon =

American basketball player (born 1989)

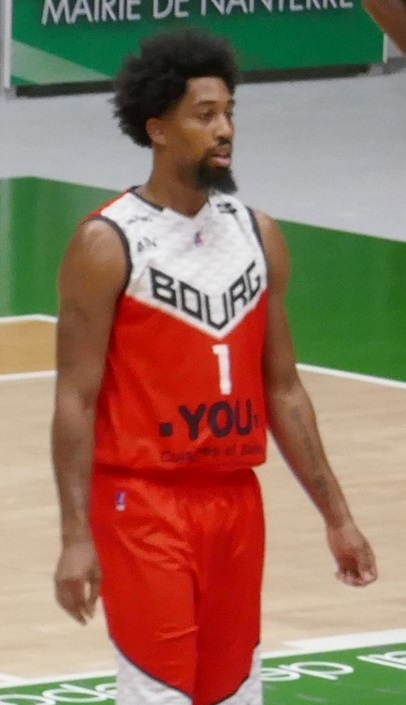
- Simon with JL Bourg in 2017

Personal information
- Born: March 11, 1989 (age 37) Detroit, Michigan, U.S.
- Listed height: 6 ft 7 in (2.01 m)
- Listed weight: 210 lb (95 kg)

Career information
- High school: Detroit Community (Detroit, Michigan)
- College: Central Michigan (2007–2008); Detroit Mercy (2009–2012)
- NBA draft: 2012: undrafted
- Playing career: 2012–2023
- Position: Shooting guard / small forward

Career history
- 2012–2013: Šiauliai
- 2013–2014: Siarka Tarnobrzeg
- 2014–2015: Anwil Włocławek
- 2015–2016: Manresa
- 2016–2017: Maccabi Ashdod
- 2017–2018: JL Bourg
- 2018–2020: Anwil Włocławek
- 2020–2023: JDA Dijon

Career highlights
- Polish Cup winner (2019); PLK Champion (2019); Israeli League All-Star (2017); Lithuanian League All-Star (2013); Second-team All-Horizon League (2010)

Chase Simon (born March 11, 1989) is a retired American professional basketball player. During his professional career, Simon played in Lithuania, Poland, Spain, Israel and France. He played college basketball for Central Michigan and Detroit.

== Early life and college career ==
Simon attended Detroit Community High School in Detroit, Michigan, where he averaged 23 points and seven rebounds per game, leading his team to the quarter-finals at the 2007 state tournament. Simon earned a spot in the First-team Class C All-State.

Simon started his college basketball career at Central Michigan, where he averaged 4.1 points and 1.5 rebounds per game in his freshman year. On September 3, 2008, Simon was transferred from Central Michigan to Detroit, but sat out first season at Detroit per NCAA Transfer rules. In his senior year at Detroit, he averaged 13.2 points, 4.3 rebounds, 2.4 assists and 1.1 steals per game. Simon finished his UDM career with 1,386 points – 17th in Titan history.

== Professional career ==
=== Šiauliai (2012–2013) ===
After going undrafted in the 2012 NBA draft, Simon joined the Chicago Bulls for the 2012 NBA Summer League.

On September 26, 2012, Simon signed his first professional contract with Greek team Aris. However, Simon parted ways with Aris due to the club's financial difficulties before appearing in any game for them.

On October 19, 2012, Simon signed with the Lithuanian team Šiauliai for the 2012–13 season.

=== Siarka Tarnobrzeg (2013–2014) ===
On August 15, 2013, Simon signed a one-year deal with the Polish team Siarka Tarnobrzeg.

=== Anwil Włocławek (2014–2015) ===
On August 7, 2014, Simon signed with Anwil Włocławek for the 2014–15 season. On December 28, 2014, Simon recorded a career-high 30 points, shooting 10-of-14 from the field, along with three rebounds in a 72–91 loss to Śląsk Wrocław. In 30 games played for Włocławek, he averaged 16.8 points, 3.3 rebounds, 2.3 assists and 1.7 steals per game.

=== Manresa (2015–2016) ===
On August 25, 2015, Simon signed a one-year deal with the Spanish team Manresa.

=== Maccabi Ashdod (2016–2017) ===
On August 8, 2016, Simon signed with the Israeli team Maccabi Ashdod for the 2016–17 season. On March 13, 2017, Simon recorded a season-high 29 points, shooting 12-of-22 from the field in a 94–70 blowout win over Bnei Herzliya. On April 13, 2017, Simon recorded 22 points, shooting 6-of-8 from 3-point range, along with four rebounds and four assists in an 82–77 win over Maccabi Haifa. He was subsequently named Israeli League Round 27 MVP.

In 33 games played for Ashdod, Simon finished the season as the league fifth-leading scorer with 17.1 points, while also averaging 4.6 rebounds, 3.4 assists and 1.2 steals per game.

=== JL Bourg (2017–2018) ===
On July 7, 2017, Simon signed a one-year deal with JL Bourg of the French Pro A League. On March 16, 2018, Simon recorded a season-high 23 points, shooting 7-of-13 from the field, along with six rebounds in an 82–93 loss to Pau-Orthez.

=== Return to Włocławek (2018–2020) ===
On September 8, 2018, Simon returned to Anwil Włocławek for a second stint, signing a one-year deal.

=== JDA Dijon (2020–2023) ===
On June 17, 2020, he has signed with JDA Dijon of the LNB Pro A. He announced his retirement from professional basketball in September 2023, after having appeared in only 15 games during the 2022-23 regular season because of injuries.

== Personal life ==
Simon was raised by his mother Denise Simon on the West side of Detroit. His cousin, Randy Brown, played basketball at New Mexico State and for three NBA teams.
