= Txemi Urtasun =

Spanish basketball player

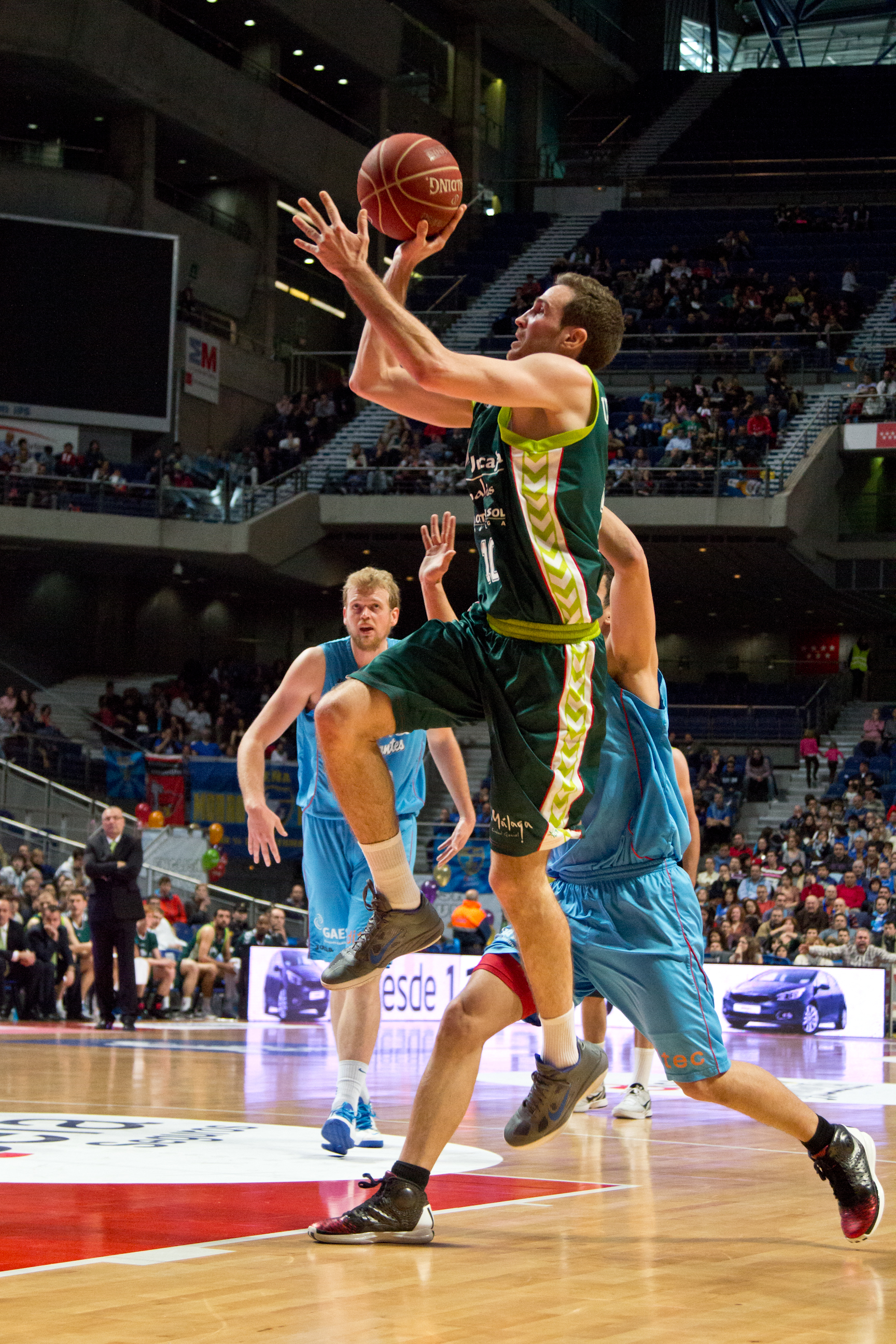

Río Ourense Termal
- Position: Shooting guard
- League: LEB Oro

Personal information
- Born: April 30, 1984 (age 42) Pamplona, Spain
- Listed height: 6 ft 4 in (1.93 m)
- Listed weight: 200 lb (91 kg)

Career information
- NBA draft: 2006: undrafted
- Playing career: 2002–present

Career history
- 2002–2003: Bilbao Basket
- 2003–2004: La Palma
- 2004–2005: Zaragoza
- 2005–2006: Breogán
- 2006–2007: Gipuzkoa Basket
- 2007: Estudiantes
- 2007–2008: León
- 2008–2010: Alicante
- 2010–2012: Sevilla
- 2012–2014: Unicaja
- 2014–2015: Gran Canaria
- 2015–2016: Gipuzkoa Basket
- 2016–2017: Obradoiro
- 2017-2018: Zaragoza
- 2018: Sevilla
- 2018–2019: Melilla
- 2020–present: Ourense

José Miguel "Txemi" Urtasun Uriz (born April 30, 1984) is a Spanish professional basketball player for Ourense of the LEB Oro. He is a 6-foot-4-inch (1.93 m) tall shooting guard. His twin brother, Álex Urtasun, is also a professional basketball player.

== Professional career ==
Urtasun began his pro career with Bilbao Basket of the Spanish 2nd Division for the 2002–03 season. He moved to UB La Palma in 2003. In 2004, he joined CAI Zaragoza. In 2005, he moved to Breogán. In 2006, he joined Bruesa GBC.

Urtasun then joined Estudiantes for the 2007–08 season, before moving to play with Baloncesto León that same season. He moved to Lucentum Alicante in 2008. In 2010, he joined Cajasol, and in 2012 he moved to Unicaja.

In December 2017, Urtasun signed with CAI Zaragoza in a one-month deal. In March 2018, after a trial period, Urtasun signed another one-month deal with Real Betis Energía Plus, this being his second stint in the Andalusian team.

On August 14, 2018, Urtasun signed with Club Melilla Baloncesto of the LEB Oro.

== Spanish national team ==
Urtasun was a member of the junior national teams of Spain. With Spain's junior national teams, he played at the 2002 FIBA Europe Under-18 Championship and at the 2004 FIBA Europe Under-20 Championship.

== Awards and accomplishments ==
- Spanish 2nd Division Cup Champion: (2009)
- Spanish 2nd Division Cup MVP: (2009)
