= Álex Urtasun =

Spanish basketball player

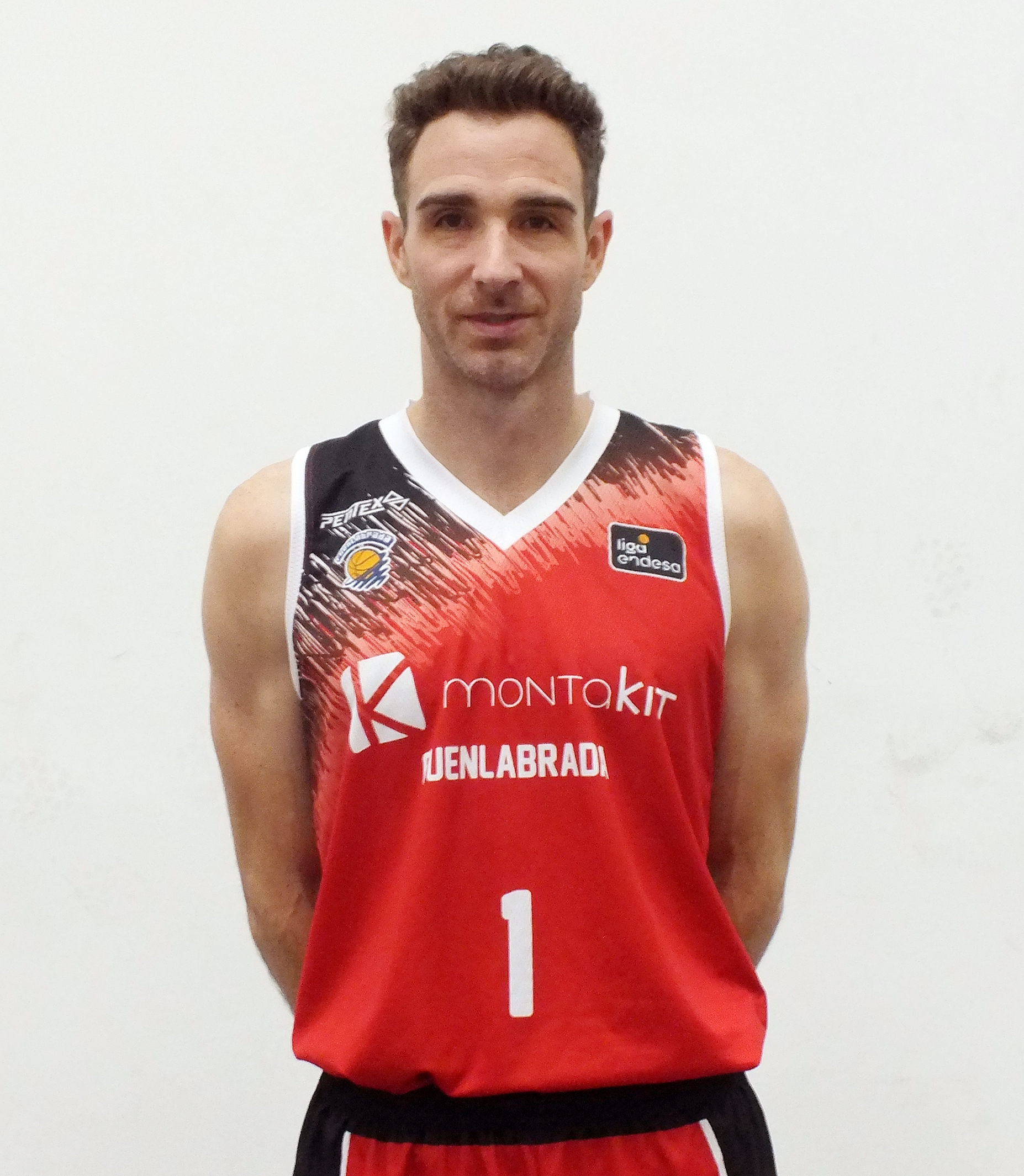
- Alex Urtasun

No. 3 – Força Lleida
- Position: Shooting guard
- League: LEB Oro

Personal information
- Born: April 30, 1984 (age 42) Pamplona, Spain
- Listed height: 6 ft 4.75 in (1.95 m)
- Listed weight: 200 lb (91 kg)

Career information
- NBA draft: 2006: undrafted
- Playing career: 2003–present

Career history
- 2003–2004: Castelló
- 2004–2005: Valencia
- 2005–2006: Plus Pujol Lleida
- 2006–2007: Alerta Cantabria
- 2007–2008: Valencia
- 2008–2009: Gipuzkoa
- 2009–2010: Baloncesto León
- 2010: Lucentum Alicante
- 2010–2012: Navarra
- 2013–2015: Sevilla
- 2015–2016: Fuenlabrada
- 2016–2017: SLUC Nancy
- 2017–2019: UCAM Murcia
- 2019–2021: Fuenlabrada
- 2021–2022: Río Breogán
- 2022: Estudiantes
- 2022–: Força Lleida

Alejandro "Álex" Urtasun Uriz (born April 30, 1984) is a Spanish professional basketball player for Força Lleida of the LEB Oro. His twin brother, Txemi Urtasun, is also a professional basketball player.

Urtasun signed with Estudiantes on February 16, 2022.
