= Halil Kanacević =

Montenegrin basketball player

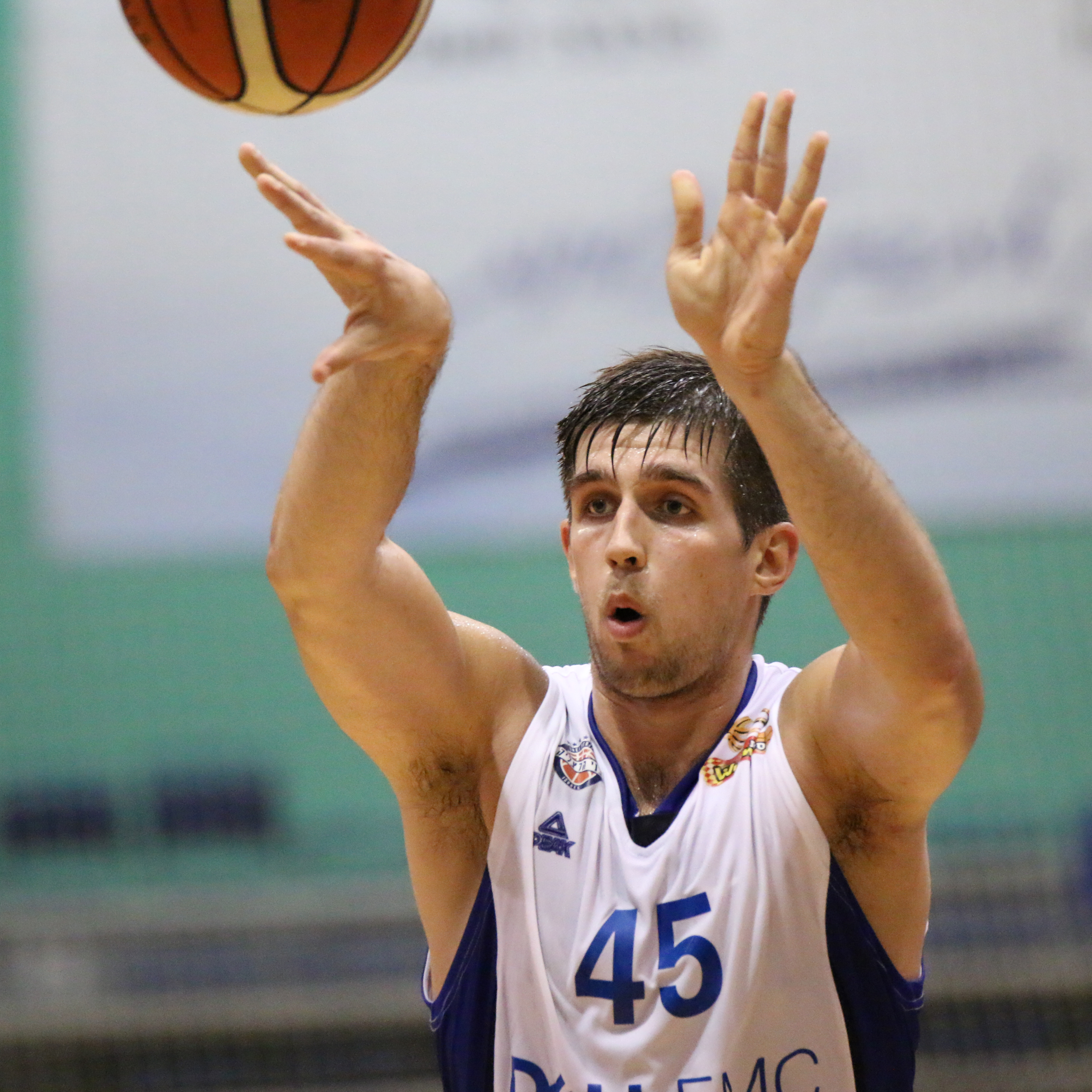
- Kanacević in 2016

Personal information
- Born: October 23, 1991 (age 35) Staten Island, New York, U.S.
- Listed height: 6 ft 8 in (2.03 m)
- Listed weight: 260 lb (118 kg)

Career information
- High school: Curtis (Staten Island, New York)
- College: Hofstra (2009–2010); Saint Joseph's (2011–2014)
- NBA draft: 2014: undrafted
- Playing career: 2014–2018
- Position: Power forward / center

Career history
- 2014: Virtus Roma
- 2014–2015: Union Olimpija
- 2015–2016: CAI Zaragoza
- 2016: Budućnost
- 2016–2017: Bnei Herzliya
- 2017–2018: Trikala Aries

Career highlights
- Montenegrin League champion (2016); Montenegrin Cup winner (2016); Atlantic 10 tournament MVP (2014)

Halil Kanacević (Albanian: Halil Kanaci; born October 23, 1991) is an American-born Montenegrin former professional basketball player. He played college basketball at Saint Joseph's University, where he helped lead the team to the 2014 Atlantic 10 championship.

== High school career ==
Kanacević attended and played basketball for Curtis High School. Although he excelled, Curtis was a chronically overlooked high school in basketball circles, and had the misfortune of barely missing chances to make long runs in New York high school basketball competition. Due to this, he was often overlooked in the recruiting process, although he received offers from University of Central Florida, Manhattan College, Quinnipiac, and Hofstra. He eventually committed to Hofstra.

== College career ==
Kanacević originally committed to Hofstra, but after a season he decided in May 2010 to move to Saint Joseph's University. He made his March Madness debut in 2014, when St. Joseph's was eliminated by eventual tournament-winners Connecticut in the first round; he scored 12 points in St. Joseph's 81–89 loss. Counting his freshman season at Hofstra, Kanacević finished his collegiate career with 1,163 points, 1,028 rebounds, 407 assists and 202 blocked shots. At St. Joseph's, he was coached by Phil Martelli.

== Professional career ==
Kanacević signed his first professional contract with Virtus Roma in April 2014. After only a few months, he terminated his contract with Roma and moved to KK Union Olimpija on a one-year deal. In July 2015, Kanacević joined the Washington Wizards in the NBA's 2015 Summer League. On August 27, 2015, it was announced that CAI Zaragoza of Spain signed Kanacević. On January 6, 2016, he parted ways with Zaragoza and one week later he signed with Montenegrin KK Budućnost for the rest of the season.

On June 27, 2016, Kanacević signed with Israeli team Bnei Herzliya for the 2016–17 season.

On June 7, 2017, Kanacević signed a one-year contract extension with Bnei Herzliya. However, on November 6, 2017, Kanacević was released by Herzliya after appearing in five games. In December 2017, he signed with Trikala Aries of the Greek Basket League.

== International career ==
In 2011, when Halil traveled back to visit his uncle Rizo Popović, he played for Montenegro's national men's U20 basketball team. He averaged almost 5 points and rebounds per game during the 2011 FIBA Europe Under-20 Championship.

== The Basketball Tournament ==
Halil Kanacevic played for Gael Nation in the 2018 edition of The Basketball Tournament. In 2 games, he averaged 1 point, 1.5 assists, and 3.5 rebounds per game. Gael Nation reached the second round before falling to Armored Athlete.

== Personal life ==
Kanacević was born in South Beach, Staten Island, New York to ethnic Albanian parents from Bar, Montenegro. His parents emigrated to the United States from SR Montenegro, SFR Yugoslavia in the late 1980s.
