= 2015–16 Eurocup Basketball knockout stage =

The 2015–16 Eurocup Basketball knockout stage was played from 23 February to 27 April 2016. A total of 16 teams compete in the knockout stage.

== Format ==
In the knockout stage, teams played against each other over two legs on a home-and-away basis, with the overall cumulative score determining the winner of a round. Thus, the score of one single game can be tied.

- The team that finished in the higher Last 32 place will be played the second game of the series at home.
- If both teams placed the same in the Last 32, the team with more Last 32 victories will be played the second game at home.
- In case of a tie in both place and victories, the team with the higher cumulative Last 32 point difference will be played the second game at home.

== Qualified teams ==
Group	Winners (Seeded in eighthfinals)	Runners-up (Unseeded in eighthfinals)
G	(Germany) Bayern Munich	(Turkey) Banvit
H	(Spain) Herbalife Gran Canaria	(France) SIG Strasbourg
I	(Germany) EWE Baskets Oldenburg	(France) Limoges CSP
J	(Italy) EA7 Emporio Armani Milan	(Germany) Alba Berlin
K	(Italy) Dolomiti Energia Trento	(Turkey) Pınar Karşıyaka
L	(Russia) Zenit Saint Petersburg	(Poland) Stelmet Zielona Góra
M	(Russia) UNICS	(Russia) Nizhny Novgorod
N	(Turkey) Galatasaray Odeabank	(Spain) CAI Zaragoza

=== Standings ===
Pos	Grp	Team	Pld	W	L	PF	PA	PD	Seeding
1	M	(Russia) UNICS	6	6	0	495	449	+46	Seeded in eighthfinals
2	H	(Spain) Herbalife Gran Canaria	6	5	1	531	440	+91	Seeded in eighthfinals
3	N	(Turkey) Galatasaray Odeabank	6	4	2	493	414	+79	Seeded in eighthfinals
4	J	(Italy) EA7 Emporio Armani Milan	6	4	2	474	442	+32	Seeded in eighthfinals
5	G	(Germany) Bayern Munich	6	4	2	476	454	+22	Seeded in eighthfinals
6	L	(Russia) Zenit Saint Petersburg	6	4	2	479	470	+9	Seeded in eighthfinals
7	I	(Germany) EWE Baskets Oldenburg	6	4	2	494	490	+4	Seeded in eighthfinals
8	K	(Italy) Dolomiti Energia Trento	6	4	2	470	467	+3	Seeded in eighthfinals
9	G	(Turkey) Banvit	6	4	2	487	455	+32	Unseeded in eighthfinals
10	N	(Spain) CAI Zaragoza	6	4	2	480	451	+29	Unseeded in eighthfinals
11	H	(France) SIG Strasbourg	6	4	2	464	456	+8	Unseeded in eighthfinals
12	K	(Turkey) Pınar Karşıyaka	6	3	3	498	426	+72	Unseeded in eighthfinals
13	I	(France) Limoges CSP	6	3	3	494	467	+27	Unseeded in eighthfinals
14	J	(Germany) Alba Berlin	6	3	3	447	433	+14	Unseeded in eighthfinals
15	M	(Russia) Nizhny Novgorod	6	3	3	490	482	+8	Unseeded in eighthfinals
16	L	(Poland) Stelmet Zielona Góra	6	3	3	458	463	−5	Unseeded in eighthfinals

Source: Eurocup Basketball

== Bracket ==
Eighthfinals; February 24 – March 2
(Germany) Bayern Munich	82	84	166
(Germany) Alba Berlin	82	75	157
(Turkey) Galatasaray Odeabank	64	93	157
(Turkey) Pınar Karşıyaka	67	65	132
(Spain) Herbalife Gran Canaria	82	77	159
(France) Limoges CSP	65	78	143
(Russia) UNICS	72	54	126
(Poland) Stelmet Zielona Góra	68	71	139
(Germany) EWE Baskets Oldenburg	78	64	142
(France) SIG Strasbourg	76	93	169
(Russia) Zenit Saint Petersburg	76	89	165
(Russia) Nizhny Novgorod	102	74	176
(Italy) EA7 Emporio Armani Milan	72	79	151
(Turkey) Banvit	69	76	145
(Italy) Dolomiti Energia Trento	83	79	162
(Spain) CAI Zaragoza	85	65	150

Quarterfinals; March 15 – March 23
(Germany) Bayern Munich	99	59	158
(Turkey) Galatasaray Odeabank	89	72	161
(Spain) Herbalife Gran Canaria	93	83	176
(Poland) Stelmet Zielona Góra	82	86	168
(France) SIG Strasbourg	94	91	185
(Russia) Nizhny Novgorod	85	91	176
(Italy) EA7 Emporio Armani Milan	73	79	152
(Italy) Dolomiti Energia Trento	83	92	175

Semifinals; March 29 – April 6
(Turkey) Galatasaray Odeabank	89	81	170
(Spain) Herbalife Gran Canaria	75	94	169
(France) SIG Strasbourg	68	86	154
(Italy) Dolomiti Energia Trento	74	78	152

Finals; April 22 – April 27
(Turkey) Galatasaray Odeabank	62	78	140
(France) SIG Strasbourg	66	67	133

== Eighthfinals ==
The first legs were played on 24 February, and the second legs were played on 1 and 2 March 2016.

Team 1	Agg.	Team 2	1st leg	2nd leg
Bayern Munich (Germany)	166–157	(Germany) Alba Berlin	82–82	84–75
Herbalife Gran Canaria (Spain)	159–143	(France) Limoges CSP	82–65	77–78
EWE Baskets Oldenburg (Germany)	142–169	(France) SIG Strasbourg	78–76	64–93
EA7 Emporio Armani Milan (Italy)	151–145	(Turkey) Banvit	72–69	79–76
Dolomiti Energia Trento (Italy)	162–150	(Spain) CAI Zaragoza	83–85	79–65
Zenit Saint Petersburg (Russia)	165–176	(Russia) Nizhny Novgorod	76–102	89–74
UNICS (Russia)	126–139	(Poland) Stelmet Zielona Góra	72–68	54–71
Galatasaray Odeabank (Turkey)	157–132	(Turkey) Pınar Karşıyaka	64–67	93–65

=== First leg ===
24 February 2016	Banvit (Turkey)	69–72	(Italy) EA7 Emporio Armani Milan	Bandırma, Turkey
18:00 (CET)	Scoring by quarter: 13–11, 25–19, 12–23, 19–19
	Pts: Fortson 18; Rebs: Moerman 10; Asts: Fortson 7 PIR: Fortson 20	Boxscore	Pts: Sanders 19; Rebs: McLean 9 Asts: Simon 5 PIR: Simon 18	Arena: Banvit Kara Ali Acar Sport Hall; Referees: Spiros Gkontas (GRE), Carlos Peruga (ESP), Marko Juras (SRB)

24 February 2016	Nizhny Novgorod (Russia)	102–76	(Russia) Zenit Saint Petersburg	Nizhny Novgorod, Russia
18:00 (CET)	Scoring by quarter: 27–12, 29–22, 27–16, 19–26
	Pts: Rudd 28; Rebs: Rudd 8 Asts: Khvostov 8 PIR: Rudd 32	Boxscore	Pts: Dowdell 15; Rebs: Timma 17; Asts: Timma 4 PIR: Dowdell, Pushkov 18	Arena: CEC Nagorny; Referees: Siniša Herceg (CRO), Marek Ćmikiewicz (POL), Aare Halliko (EST)

24 February 2016	Pınar Karşıyaka (Turkey)	67–64	(Turkey) Galatasaray Odeabank	İzmir, Turkey
18:00 (CET)	Scoring by quarter: 20–15, 18–12, 13–18, 16–19
	Pts: Iverson 16; Rebs: Iverson 10; Asts: Jones 7 PIR: Iverson 30	Boxscore	Pts: McCollum 21; Rebs: McCollum 13; Asts: Güler, Micov 4 PIR: McCollum 32	Arena: Karşıyaka Arena; Referees: Saša Pukl (SLO), Srđan Dožai (CRO), Miguel Ángel Pérez Niz (ESP)

24 February 2016	Stelmet Zielona Góra (Poland)	68–72	(Russia) UNICS	Zielona Góra, Poland
19:00 (CET)	Scoring by quarter: 21–13, 14–17, 14–25, 19–17
	Pts: Ponitka 21; Rebs: Borovnjak 7 Asts: Bost 8 PIR: Ponitka 19	Boxscore	Pts: Langford 19; Rebs: Williams 8 Asts: Colom 11; PIR: Colom 27	Arena: Centrum Rekreacyjno Sportowe; Referees: Petri Mäntylä (FIN), Benjamín Jiménez (ESP), Arnis Ozols (LAT)

24 February 2016	Alba Berlin (Germany)	82–82	(Germany) Bayern Munich	Berlin, Germany
19:30 (CET)	Scoring by quarter: 22–19, 25–22, 20–23, 15–18
	Pts: Taylor 18; Rebs: three players 4 Asts: Milosavljević 6 PIR: Taylor 31	Boxscore	Pts: Savanović 15; Rebs: Savanović 7 Asts: Renfroe 6 PIR: Thompson 16	Arena: Mercedes-Benz Arena; Referees: Antonio Conde (ESP), Tolga Sahin (ITA), Boris Shulga (UKR)

24 February 2016	CAI Zaragoza (Spain)	85–83	(Italy) Dolomiti Energia Trento	Zaragoza, Spain
20:30 (CET)	Scoring by quarter: 18–28, 26–17, 24–21, 17–17
	Pts: Bellas, Kravtsov 14; Rebs: Norel 8 Asts: Henry 4 PIR: Norel 19	Boxscore	Pts: Wright 22; Rebs: three players 6 Asts: Forray, Poeta 4 PIR: Pascolo 26	Arena: Pabellón Príncipe Felipe; Referees: Ioannis Foufis (GRE), Joseph Bissang (FRA), Haris Bijedić (BIH)

24 February 2016	Limoges CSP (France)	65–82	(Spain) Herbalife Gran Canaria	Limoges, France
20:40 (CET)	Scoring by quarter: 11–22, 18–15, 15–25, 21–20
	Pts: Boungou Colo, Westermann 13; Rebs: Boungou Colo 6 Asts: Westermann 6 PIR: Boungou Colo 20	Boxscore	Pts: Salin 18; Rebs: Omić 9 Asts: Pangos 6 PIR: Salin 17	Arena: Beaublanc; Referees: Fernando Rocha (POR), Petros Papapetrou (GRE), David Romano (ISR)

24 February 2016	SIG Strasbourg (France)	76–78	(Germany) EWE Baskets Oldenburg	Strasbourg, France
20:45 (CET)	Scoring by quarter: 19–21, 22–25, 16–15, 19–17
	Pts: Beaubois 17; Rebs: Howard 11; Asts: Howard, Lacombe 3 PIR: Lacombe 18	Boxscore	Pts: Paulding 24; Rebs: Qvale 6 Asts: Kramer 6 PIR: Paulding 27	Arena: Rhénus Sport; Referees: Vicente Bultó (ESP), Sergey Zashchuk (UKR), Petar Obradović (BIH)

=== Second leg ===
1 March 2016	Galatasaray Odeabank (Turkey)	93–65	(Turkey) Pınar Karşıyaka	Istanbul, Turkey
19:00 (CET)	Scoring by quarter: 20–20, 23–12, 27–19, 23–14
	Pts: McCollum 21; Rebs: three players 7 Asts: McCollum 7 PIR: McCollum 29	Boxscore	Pts: Gabriel 18; Rebs: Gönlüm 8 Asts: Wright 3 PIR: Gabriel 21	Arena: Abdi İpekçi Arena; Referees: Daniel Hierrezuelo (ESP), Sérgio Silva (POR), Gentian Cici (ALB)

1 March 2016	Bayern Munich (Germany)	84–75	(Germany) Alba Berlin	Munich, Germany
20:00 (CET)	Scoring by quarter: 23–20, 21–14, 16–20, 24–21
	Pts: Renfroe, Savanović 17; Rebs: three players 5 Asts: Gavel 4 PIR: Gavel 20	Boxscore	Pts: Cherry 18; Rebs: Milosavljević 8 Asts: Taylor 7 PIR: Taylor 19	Arena: Audi Dome; Referees: Vicente Bultó (ESP), Robert Vyklický (CZE), Tomasz Trawicki (POL)

1 March 2016	Dolomiti Energia Trento (Italy)	79–65	(Spain) CAI Zaragoza	Trento, Italy
20:30 (CET)	Scoring by quarter: 18–17, 15–16, 26–16, 20–16
	Pts: Wright 21; Rebs: Wright 8 Asts: Lockett, Pascolo 3 PIR: Wright 21	Boxscore	Pts: Sastre 16; Rebs: Kravtsov 5 Asts: Henry 4 PIR: Sastre 20	Arena: PalaTrento; Referees: Matej Boltauzer (SLO), Nicola Maestre (FRA), Renaud Geller (BEL)

1 March 2016	EWE Baskets Oldenburg (Germany)	64–93	(France) SIG Strasbourg	Oldenburg, Germany
20:45 (CET)	Scoring by quarter: 14–27, 21–21, 14–25, 15–20
	Pts: Prepelič 13; Rebs: Qvale 5 Asts: Machado 4 PIR: Prepelič 11	Boxscore	Pts: Beaubois, Collins 16; Rebs: Howard 11; Asts: Collins 7 PIR: Collins 23	Arena: Kleine EWE Arena; Referees: Juan Carlos García González (ESP), Radomir Vojinović (MNE), Jasmina Juras (SRB)

2 March 2016	UNICS (Russia)	54–71	(Poland) Stelmet Zielona Góra	Kazan, Russia
17:00 (CET)	Scoring by quarter: 18–15, 15–14, 10–23, 11–19
	Pts: Kaimakoglou 12; Rebs: Parakhouski, Ponkrashov 6 Asts: Ponkrashov 5 PIR: three players 12	Boxscore	Pts: Ponitka 18; Rebs: Bost 5 Asts: Bost 7 PIR: Bost 25	Arena: Basket Hall Kazan; Referees: Óscar Perea (ESP), Alessandro Martolini (ITA), Tomislav Vovk (CRO)

2 March 2016	Zenit Saint Petersburg (Russia)	89–74	(Russia) Nizhny Novgorod	Saint Petersburg, Russia
18:00 (CET)	Scoring by quarter: 22–24, 19–19, 23–14, 25–17
	Pts: Toolson 24; Rebs: Desyatnikov 6 Asts: Dowdell 7 PIR: Toolson 24	Boxscore	Pts: Antonov 18; Rebs: Rudd 11; Asts: Khvostov 6 PIR: Rudd 21	Arena: Sibur Arena; Referees: Ioannis Foufis (GRE), Mario Majkić (SLO), Aleksandar Glišić (SRB)

2 March 2016	EA7 Emporio Armani Milan (Italy)	79–76	(Turkey) Banvit	Milan, Italy
20:00 (CET)	Scoring by quarter: 18–22, 23–25, 18–13, 20–16
	Pts: McLean 16; Rebs: McLean 7 Asts: Lafayette, Simon 3 PIR: McLean 25	Boxscore	Pts: Moerman 18; Rebs: Fortson 9 Asts: Fortson 7 PIR: Moerman 18	Arena: Mediolanum Forum; Referees: Carlos Cortés (ESP), Moritz Reiter (GER), Markos Michaelides (SUI)

2 March 2016	Herbalife Gran Canaria (Spain)	77–78	(France) Limoges CSP	Las Palmas, Spain
21:00 (CET)	Scoring by quarter: 18–24, 24–18, 12–19, 23–17
	Pts: Omić 15; Rebs: Omić 7 Asts: Pangos 6 PIR: Omić 22	Boxscore	Pts: Traoré 19; Rebs: Daniels 7 Asts: Westermann 3 PIR: Traoré 19	Arena: Gran Canaria Arena; Referees: Tolga Sahin (ITA), Aare Halliko (EST), Ingus Baumanis (LAT)

== Quarterfinals ==
The first legs were played on 15 and 16 March, and the second legs were played on 22 and 23 March 2016.

Team 1	Agg.	Team 2	1st leg	2nd leg
Galatasaray Odeabank (Turkey)	161–158	(Germany) Bayern Munich	89–99	72–59
Herbalife Gran Canaria (Spain)	176–168	(Poland) Stelmet Zielona Góra	93–82	83–86
SIG Strasbourg (France)	185–176	(Russia) Nizhny Novgorod	94–85	91–91
EA7 Emporio Armani Milan (Italy)	152–175	(Italy) Dolomiti Energia Trento	73–83	79–92

=== First leg ===
15 March 2016	Bayern Munich (Germany)	99–89	(Turkey) Galatasaray Odeabank	Munich, Germany
20:00 (CET)	Scoring by quarter: 29–22, 21–22, 24–23, 25–22
	Pts: Thompson 20; Rebs: Bryant, Thompson 9 Asts: Renfroe 5 PIR: Thompson 27	Boxscore	Pts: Micov 22; Rebs: Güler, McCollum 5 Asts: McCollum 7 PIR: Lasme 28	Arena: Audi Dome; Referees: Elias Koromilas (GRE), Aare Halliko (EST), Saverio Lanzarini (ITA)

15 March 2016	Dolomiti Energia Trento (Italy)	83–73	(Italy) EA7 Emporio Armani Milan	Trento, Italy
20:30 (CET)	Scoring by quarter: 21–19, 24–22, 21–12, 17–20
	Pts: Poeta 20; Rebs: Wright 10; Asts: Forray, Poeta 3 PIR: Pascolo 23	Boxscore	Pts: Kalnietis 16; Rebs: Mačvan 6 Asts: Kalnietis 7 PIR: Kalnietis 23	Arena: PalaTrento; Referees: Emilio Pérez Pizarro (ESP), Robert Vyklický (CZE), Clemens Fritz (GER)

16 March 2016	Nizhny Novgorod (Russia)	85–94	(France) SIG Strasbourg	Nizhny Novgorod, Russia
17:45 (CET)	Scoring by quarter: 28–25, 20–25, 19–25, 18–19
	Pts: Baburin 20; Rebs: Ivlev 7 Asts: Khvostov 5 PIR: Baburin 22	Boxscore	Pts: Collins 24; Rebs: Duport 5 Asts: Lacombe 4 PIR: Collins 27	Arena: CEC Nagorny; Referees: Petri Mäntylä (FIN), Milija Vojinović (SRB), Josip Radojković (CRO)

16 March 2016	Stelmet Zielona Góra (Poland)	82–93	(Spain) Herbalife Gran Canaria	Zielona Góra, Poland
19:15 (CET)	Scoring by quarter: 20–23, 29–21, 16–23, 17–26
	Pts: Bost 20; Rebs: Moldoveanu, Bost 6 Asts: Bost 8 PIR: Bost 28	Boxscore	Pts: Omić 20; Rebs: Omić 8 Asts: Pangos 8 PIR: Omić 27	Arena: Centrum Rekreacyjno Sportowe; Referees: Ioannis Foufis (GRE), Sašo Petek (SLO), Igor Mitrovski (MKD)

=== Second leg ===
22 March 2016	Galatasaray Odeabank (Turkey)	72–59	(Germany) Bayern Munich	Istanbul, Turkey
19:00 (CET)	Scoring by quarter: 23–14, 20–11, 11–20, 18–14
	Pts: McCollum 15; Rebs: Lasme, Schilb 9 Asts: Schilb 4 PIR: Schilb 21	Boxscore	Pts: Thompson 14; Rebs: Bryant 8 Asts: Renfroe 5 PIR: Thompson 11	Arena: Abdi İpekçi Arena; Referees: Joseph Bissang (FRA), Marcin Kowalski (POL), Renaud Geller (BEL)

23 March 2016	SIG Strasbourg (France)	91–91(OT)	(Russia) Nizhny Novgorod	Strasbourg, France
20:00 (CET)	Scoring by quarter: 16–24, 16–21, 18–19, 15–10, Overtime: 12–12, 14–5
	Pts: Weems 35; Rebs: Fofana 9 Asts: Collins 7 PIR: Weems 32	Boxscore	Pts: Rudd 26; Rebs: Mahalbašić 10; Asts: Khvostov 8 PIR: Mahalbašić 28	Arena: Rhénus Sport; Referees: Matej Boltauzer (SLO), Miguel Ángel Pérez Niz (ESP), Tomislav Hordov (CRO)

23 March 2016	EA7 Emporio Armani Milan (Italy)	79–92	(Italy) Dolomiti Energia Trento	Milan, Italy
20:00 (CET)	Scoring by quarter: 19–24, 24–24, 11–21, 25–23
	Pts: Simon 14; Rebs: McLean 12; Asts: Mačvan 4 PIR: McLean 23	Boxscore	Pts: Sutton 20; Rebs: Sutton 8 Asts: Sutton 7 PIR: Sutton 34	Arena: Mediolanum Forum; Referees: Benjamín Jiménez (ESP), Marek Cmikiewicz (POL), Petar Obradović (BIH)

23 March 2016	Herbalife Gran Canaria (Spain)	83–86	(Poland) Stelmet Zielona Góra	Las Palmas, Spain
21:30 (CET)	Scoring by quarter: 24–18, 21–21, 25–19, 13–28
	Pts: Omić 14; Rebs: Rabaseda 6 Asts: Oliver 5 PIR: Omić 22	Boxscore	Pts: Koszarek, Moldoveanu 15; Rebs: Ponitka 7 Asts: Koszarek 7 PIR: Koszarek 20	Arena: Gran Canaria Arena; Referees: Seffi Shemmesh (ISR), Siniša Herceg (CRO), Saverio Lanzarini (ITA)

== Semifinals ==
The first legs were played on 29 and 30 March, and the second legs were played on 6 April 2016.

Team 1	Agg.	Team 2	1st leg	2nd leg
Herbalife Gran Canaria (Spain)	169–170	(Turkey) Galatasaray Odeabank	75–89	94–81
Dolomiti Energia Trento (Italy)	152–154	(France) SIG Strasbourg	74–68	78–86

=== First leg ===
29 March 2016	SIG Strasbourg (France)	68–74	(Italy) Dolomiti Energia Trento	Strasbourg, France
20:00 (CEST)	Scoring by quarter: 16–31, 21–9, 14–19, 17–15
	Pts: Fofana, Weems 15; Rebs: Fofana 10; Asts: Beaubois 5 PIR: Fofana 26	Boxscore	Pts: Wright 16; Rebs: Pascolo, Wright 7 Asts: Poeta 6 PIR: Wright 23	Arena: Rhénus Sport; Referees: Seffi Shemmesh (ISR), Ioannis Foufis (GRE), Sašo Petek (SLO)

30 March 2016	Galatasaray Odeabank (Turkey)	89–75	(Spain) Herbalife Gran Canaria	Istanbul, Turkey
19:00 (CEST)	Scoring by quarter: 25–24, 24–18, 24–14, 16–19
	Pts: McCollum 18; Rebs: Davis, Schilb 10; Asts: Micov 6 PIR: Davis 29	Boxscore	Pts: Omić 15; Rebs: Omić 6 Asts: Oliver 5 PIR: Omić 20	Arena: Abdi İpekçi Arena; Referees: Borys Ryzhyk (UKR), Milija Vojinović (SRB), Miloš Koljenšić (MNE)

=== Second leg ===
6 April 2016	Dolomiti Energia Trento (Italy)	78–86	(France) SIG Strasbourg	Trento, Italy
19:30 (CEST)	Scoring by quarter: 19–21, 16–15, 16–26, 27–24
	Pts: Pascolo 22; Rebs: Pascolo 13; Asts: Forray 5 PIR: Pascolo 27	Boxscore	Pts: Collins, Duport 20; Rebs: Duport 7 Asts: Collins 7 PIR: Duport 24	Arena: PalaTrento; Referees: Spiros Gkontas (GRE), Marcin Kowalski (POL), Semen Ovinov (RUS)

6 April 2016	Herbalife Gran Canaria (Spain)	94–81(OT)	(Turkey) Galatasaray Odeabank	Las Palmas, Spain
21:30 (CEST)	Scoring by quarter: 27–29, 21–15, 19–13, 23–19, Overtime: 4–5
	Pts: Seeley 23; Rebs: Omić 7 Asts: Seeley, Báez 5 PIR: Seeley 28	Boxscore	Pts: Micov 21; Rebs: Micov 7 Asts: Schilb, Güler 2 PIR: McCollum 23	Arena: Gran Canaria Arena; Referees: Ilija Belošević (SRB), Tomas Jasevičius (LTU), Clemens Fritz (GER)

== Finals ==
The first leg was played on 22 April, and the second leg was played on 27 April 2016.

Team 1	Agg.	Team 2	1st leg	2nd leg
Galatasaray Odeabank (Turkey)	140–133	(France) SIG Strasbourg	62–66	78–67

=== First leg ===
22 April 2016	SIG Strasbourg (France)	66–62	(Turkey) Galatasaray Odeabank	Strasbourg, France
21:00 (CEST)	Scoring by quarter: 7–8, 16–16, 20–21, 23–17
	Pts: Campbell 16; Rebs: Campbell 8 Asts: Campbell 6 PIR: Campbell 26	Boxscore	Pts: Micov 17; Rebs: Lasme 9 Asts: McCollum 3 PIR: Micov 23	Arena: Rhénus Sport; Referees: Fernando Rocha (POR), Saša Pukl (SLO), Emilio Pérez Pizarro (ESP)

=== Second leg ===
27 April 2016	Galatasaray Odeabank (Turkey)	78–67	(France) SIG Strasbourg	Istanbul, Turkey
19:00 (CEST)	Scoring by quarter: 27–16, 16–19, 18–19, 17–13
	Pts: Lasme, McCollum 16; Rebs: Lasme 10; Asts: Güler 6 PIR: McCollum 26	Boxscore	Pts: Collins 16; Rebs: Weems 6 Asts: Collins 5 PIR: Fofana 18	Arena: Abdi İpekçi Arena; Referees: Christos Christodoulou (GRE), Carmelo Paternico (ITA), Piotr Pastusiak (POL)
