= 2016 Eurocup Finals =

2016 Eurocup finals
- Event: 2015–16 Eurocup Basketball
Strasbourg	Galatasaray Odeabank
(France)	(Turkey)
133	140

First leg
Strasbourg	Galatasaray Odeabank
66	62
- Date: April 22, 2015
- Venue: Rhénus Sport, Strasbourg
- MVP: (Gabon) Stéphane Lasme

Second leg
Galatasaray Odeabank	Strasbourg
78	67
- Date: April 27, 2015
- Venue: Abdi İpekçi Arena, Istanbul

The 2016 Eurocup finals were the concluding two games of the 2015–16 Eurocup season, the 14th season of Europe's secondary club basketball tournament organised by Euroleague Basketball, and the eighth season since it was renamed from the ULEB Cup to the Eurocup. The first leg was played at the Rhénus Sport in Strasbourg, France, on 22 April 2016 and the second leg was played at the Abdi İpekçi Arena in Istanbul, Turkey, on 27 April 2016, between French side Strasbourg and Turkish side Galatasaray Odeabank.

It was the first ever Finals appearance ever of Strasbourg and Galatasaray Odeabank, after Strasbourg never reached a stage further than the quarterfinals in history and Galatasaray Odeabank never reached a stage further than the semifinals in history.

This was the last Eurocup finals to be played in aggregate system, since it's replaced by best-of-three system in 2017.

== Venues ==
The Rhénus Sport was the first leg venue as Strasbourg venue. In 1981, the arena was the venue of the European Champions Cup Final, in which Maccabi Tel Aviv defeated Sinudyne Bologna 80–79. In February 2006, the Davis Cup match between France and Sweden took place in this arena.

The Abdi İpekçi Arena was the second leg venue as Galatasaray Odeabank venue. The arena hosts national and international sports events such as basketball, volleyball, wrestling and weightlifting, concerts and congresses among others. The facility contains a multi-faced visual scoreboard, six online-system counters, four locker rooms, two internet rooms, a press room, two multi-purpose offices, VIP rooms, etc. Its parking lot has a capacity of 1,500 cars. It is named after the renowned Turkish journalist Abdi İpekçi.

Strasbourg	2016 Eurocup Finals (Europe)	Istanbul
Rhénus Sport	2016 Eurocup Finals (Europe)	Abdi İpekçi Arena
Capacity: 6,200	2016 Eurocup Finals (Europe)	Capacity: 12,270

== Road to the Finals ==
Note: In the table, the score of the finalist is given first (H = home; A = away).

(France) Strasbourg				Round	(Turkey) Galatasaray Odeabank			
Euroleague					Eurocup			
6th place (3–7) (Group A)				Regular season	1st place (7–3) (Group F)			
Eurocup
2nd place (4–2) (Group H)				Last 32	1st place (4–2) (Group N)			
Opponent	Agg.	1st leg	2nd leg	Knockout stage	Opponent	Agg.	1st leg	2nd leg
(Germany) EWE Baskets Oldenburg	169–142	76–78 (H)	93–64 (A)	Eighthfinals	(Turkey) Pınar Karşıyaka	157–132	64–67 (A)	93–65 (H)
(Russia) Nizhny Novgorod	185–176	94–85 (A)	91–91 (H)	Quarterfinals	(Germany) Bayern Munich	161–158	89–99 (A)	72–59 (H)
(Italy) Dolomiti Energia Trento	154–152	68–74 (H)	86–78 (A)	Semifinals	(Spain) Herbalife Gran Canaria	170–169	89–75 (H)	81–94 (A)

== First leg ==
22 April 2016	Strasbourg (France)	66–62	(Turkey) Galatasaray Odeabank	Strasbourg, France
21:00 (CEST)	Scoring by quarter: 7–8, 16–16, 20–21, 23–17
	Pts: Campbell 16; Rebs: Campbell 8 Asts: Campbell 6 PIR: Campbell 26	Boxscore	Pts: Micov 17; Rebs: Lasme 9 Asts: McCollum 3 PIR: Micov 23	Arena: Rhénus Sport; Attendance: 6 166; Referees: Fernando Rocha (POR), Saša Pukl (SLO), Emilio Pérez Pizarro (ESP)

Starters:			Pts	Reb	Ast
PG	13	(United States) Louis Campbell	16	8	6
SG	3	(France) Rodrigue Beaubois	5	1	1
SF	1	(United States) Mardy Collins	8	5	4
PF	34	(United States) Kyle Weems	9	5	2
C	21	(France) Bangaly Fofana	6	4	0
Reserves:					
SG	6	(France) Paul Lacombe	0	3	1
PF	9	(France) Jérémy Leloup	11	2	0
PF	16	(France) Olivier Cortale	DNP		
PG	17	(France) Frank Ntilikina	DNP		
SG	18	(Germany) Kostja Mushidi	DNP		
C	49	(France) Romain Duport	0	0	0
PF	54	(United States) Matt Howard	11	3	0
Head coach:
(French Federation of Basketball) Vincent Collet

Strasbourg	Galatasaray

Starters:			Pts	Reb	Ast
PG	3	(United States) Errick McCollum	8	3	3
SG	32	(Turkey) Sinan Güler	2	2	1
SF	1	(Czech Republic) Blake Schilb	12	8	2
PF	5	(Serbia) Vladimir Micov	17	5	1
C	13	(Gabon) Stéphane Lasme	7	9	0
Reserves:					
PG	8	(Turkey) Şafak Edge	DNP		
PF	11	(Turkey) Ege Arar	DNP		
C	16	(Turkey) Duşan Cantekin	DNP		
PF	30	(United States) Caleb Green	1	0	0
PG	55	(United States) Curtis Jerrells	4	2	2
SG	61	(Turkey) Göksenin Köksal	0	1	0
PF	63	(Azerbaijan) Chuck Davis	11	1	0
Head coach:
(Turkish Basketball Federation) Ergin Ataman

== Second leg ==
27 April 2016	Galatasaray Odeabank (Turkey)	78–67	(France) Strasbourg	Istanbul, Turkey
19:00 (CEST)	Scoring by quarter: 27–16, 16–19, 18–19, 17–13
	Pts: Lasme, McCollum 16; Rebs: Lasme 10; Asts: Güler 6 PIR: McCollum 26	Boxscore	Pts: Collins 16; Rebs: Weems 6 Asts: Collins 5 PIR: Fofana 18	Arena: Abdi İpekçi Arena; Attendance: 11 400; Referees: Christos Christodoulou (GRE), Carmelo Paternico (ITA), Piotr Pastusiak (POL)

Starters:			Pts	Reb	Ast
PG	32	(Turkey) Sinan Güler	14	8	6
SG	61	(Turkey) Göksenin Köksal	8	3	0
SF	1	(Czech Republic) Blake Schilb	11	5	2
PF	5	(Serbia) Vladimir Micov	7	3	5
C	13	(Gabon) Stéphane Lasme	16	10	0
Reserves:					
PG	3	(United States) Errick McCollum	16	5	2
PG	8	(Turkey) Şafak Edge	DNP		
PF	11	(Turkey) Ege Arar	DNP		
C	16	(Turkey) Duşan Cantekin	DNP		
PF	30	(United States) Caleb Green	DNP		
PG	55	(United States) Curtis Jerrells	0	0	0
PF	63	(Azerbaijan) Chuck Davis	6	2	0
Head coach:
(Turkish Basketball Federation) Ergin Ataman

Galatasaray	Strasbourg

2015–16 Eurocup champions

Galatasaray Odeabank
(1st title)

Starters:			Pts	Reb	Ast
PG	13	(United States) Louis Campbell	10	3	2
SG	3	(France) Rodrigue Beaubois	5	0	2
SF	1	(United States) Mardy Collins	16	4	5
PF	34	(United States) Kyle Weems	7	6	1
C	21	(France) Bangaly Fofana	9	5	2
Reserves:					
SG	6	(France) Paul Lacombe	5	2	3
PF	9	(France) Jérémy Leloup	0	5	0
PF	16	(France) Olivier Cortale	DNP		
PG	17	(France) Frank Ntilikina	DNP		
C	49	(France) Romain Duport	8	3	0
PF	54	(United States) Matt Howard	7	0	1
Head coach:
(French Federation of Basketball) Vincent Collet

== See also ==
- 2016 Euroleague Final Four
- 2016 FIBA Europe Cup Final Four
