= 2015 Match des Champions =

SIG Strasbourg	Limoges CSP
86	59
- Date: 28 September 2015
- Venue: Astroballe, Villeurbanne
- MVP: (France) Rodrigue Beaubois

The 2015 Match des Champions was the 10th edition of the annual super cup game in French basketball. This year the reigning LNB Pro A champions Limoges CSP faced off against French Cup champions SIG Strasbourg. The meeting was also a re-match of the 2014–15 Pro A Finals.

Strasbourg beat Limoges 59–86. Rodrigue Beaubois was named the games Most Valuable Player.

== Match ==
28 September 2015
20:30

Boxscore

Limoges CSP	59–86	SIG Strasbourg
Scoring by quarter: 19–29, 8–23, 15–9, 17–25
Pts: Traore 12; Rebs: Traore 10; Asts: Westermann 3		Pts: Golubović, Beaubois 16; Rebs: Golubović 7 Asts: Campbell 4

Astroballe, Villeurbanne

Starters:			Pts	Reb	Ast
PG	9	(France) Léo Westermann	9	2	3
SG	7	(United States) Will Daniels	11	2	3
SF	11	(United States) Mark Payne	6	3	1
PF	16	(France) Nobel Boungou Colo	11	3	0
C	24	(France) Ali Traoré	12	10	0
Reserves:					
F	72	(France) Abou Diallo	DNP		
F	5	(Poland) Mathieu Wojciechowski	3	1	0
SG	8	(United States) Matt Gatens	3	2	0
G	10	(France) Vincent Fauche	2	1	1
PF	12	(France) Ousmane Camara	0	3	0
C	14	(Burkina Faso) Fréjus Zerbo	2	1	0
Head coach:
(France) Philippe Hervé

Limoges	Strasbourg

MVP
(France) Rodrigue Beaubois
Game rules
10-minute quarters (FIBA rules).

2015 Match des Champions
Winners
SIG Strasbourg
1st title

Starters:			Pts	Reb	Ast
PG	3	(France) Rodrigue Beaubois	16	3	2
SG	13	(United States) Louis Campbell	6	2	4
SF	9	(France) Jérémy Leloup	8	3	2
PF	34	(United States) Kyle Weems	10	6	1
C	21	(France) Bangaly Fofana	0	1	0
Reserves:					
PG	1	(United States) Mardy Collins	0	1	2
G	6	(France) Paul Lacombe	9	2	5
F	8	(France) Frank Ntilikina	3	5	2
C	32	(Montenegro) Vladimir Golubović	16	7	0
F	49	(France) Romain Duport	12	6	1
PF	54	(United States) Matt Howard	6	5	1
Head coach:
(France) Vincent Collet
