= Greek Basketball League Defensive Player of the Year =

Greek professional basketball award

The Greek Basketball League Defensive Player of the Year, or Greek League Defensive Player of the Year, is an annual award for the best defensive player of each season of Greece's top-tier level professional basketball club league, the Greek Basketball League (GBL).

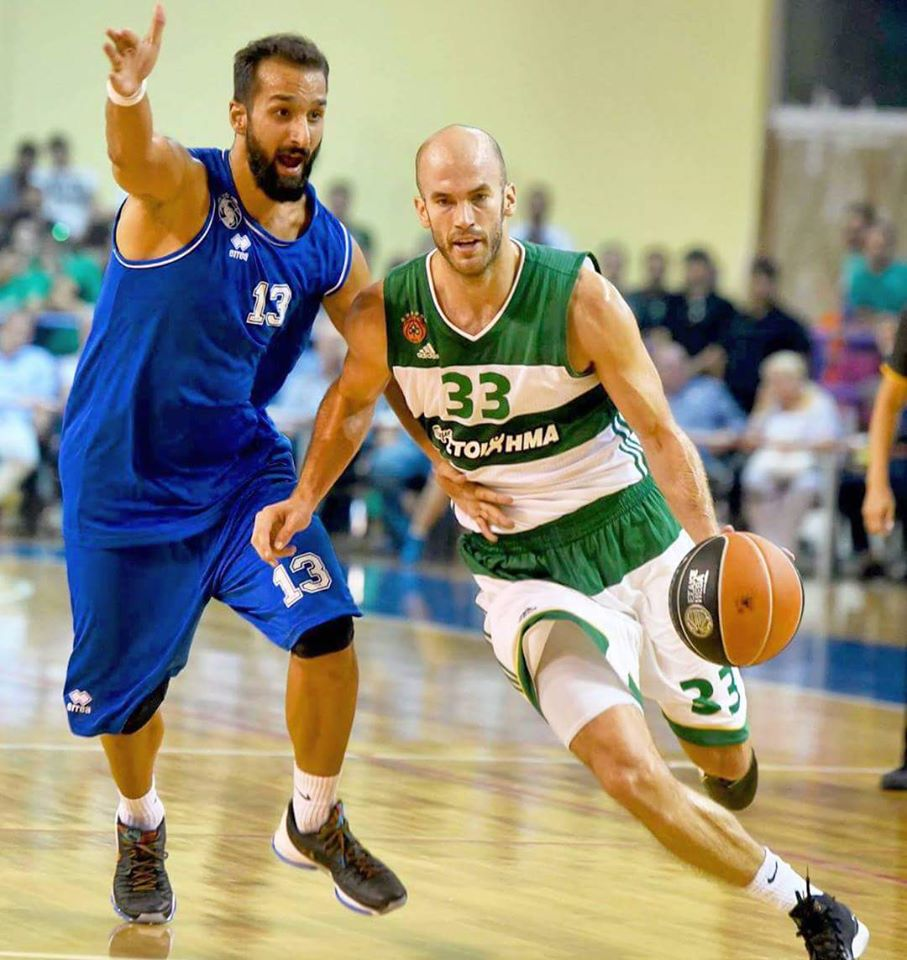
Nick Calathes (on the right, #33 in green and white) was the Greek League Defensive Player of the Year three times (2016, 2017, 2018).

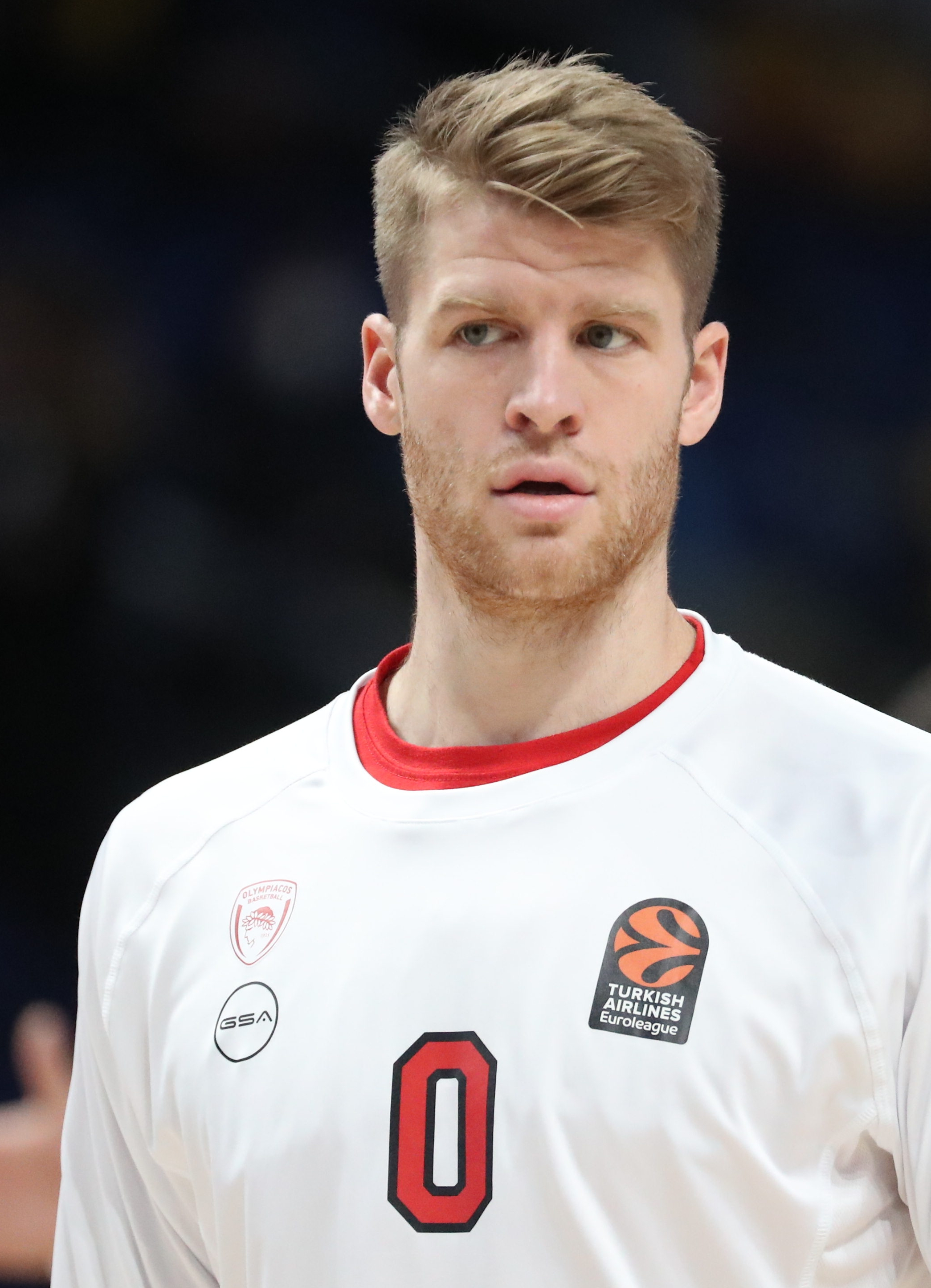
Thomas Walkup was the Greek League Defensive Player of the Year three times (2022, 2023 and 2026).

== Winners ==
Season	Player	Position	Nationality	Team	Ref.
2010–11	Dimitris Diamantidis (3x)	Point guard	Greece	Panathinaikos	
2011–12	Joey Dorsey	Center	United States	Olympiacos	
2012–13	Stéphane Lasme	Center	Gabon	Panathinaikos	
2013–14	Stéphane Lasme (2x)	Center	Gabon	Panathinaikos	
2014–15	Bryant Dunston	Center	United States	Olympiacos	
2015–16	Nick Calathes	Point guard	Greece / United States	Panathinaikos	
2016–17	Nick Calathes (2x)	Point guard	Greece / United States	Panathinaikos	
2017–18	Nick Calathes (3x)	Point guard	Greece / United States	Panathinaikos	
2018–19	Howard Sant-Roos	Small forward	Cuba	AEK	
2019–20	Canceled due to the COVID-19 pandemic				
2020–21	Howard Sant-Roos (2x)	Small forward	Cuba	Panathinaikos	
2021–22	Thomas Walkup	Point guard	United States / Greece	Olympiacos	
2022–23	Thomas Walkup (2x)	Point guard	United States / Greece	Olympiacos	
2023–24	Jerian Grant	Point guard	United States	Panathinaikos	
2024–25	Jerian Grant (2x)	Point guard	United States	Panathinaikos	
2025–26	Thomas Walkup (3x)	Point guard	United States / Greece	Olympiacos	
