= Vincent Collet =

French basketball player and coach (born 1963)

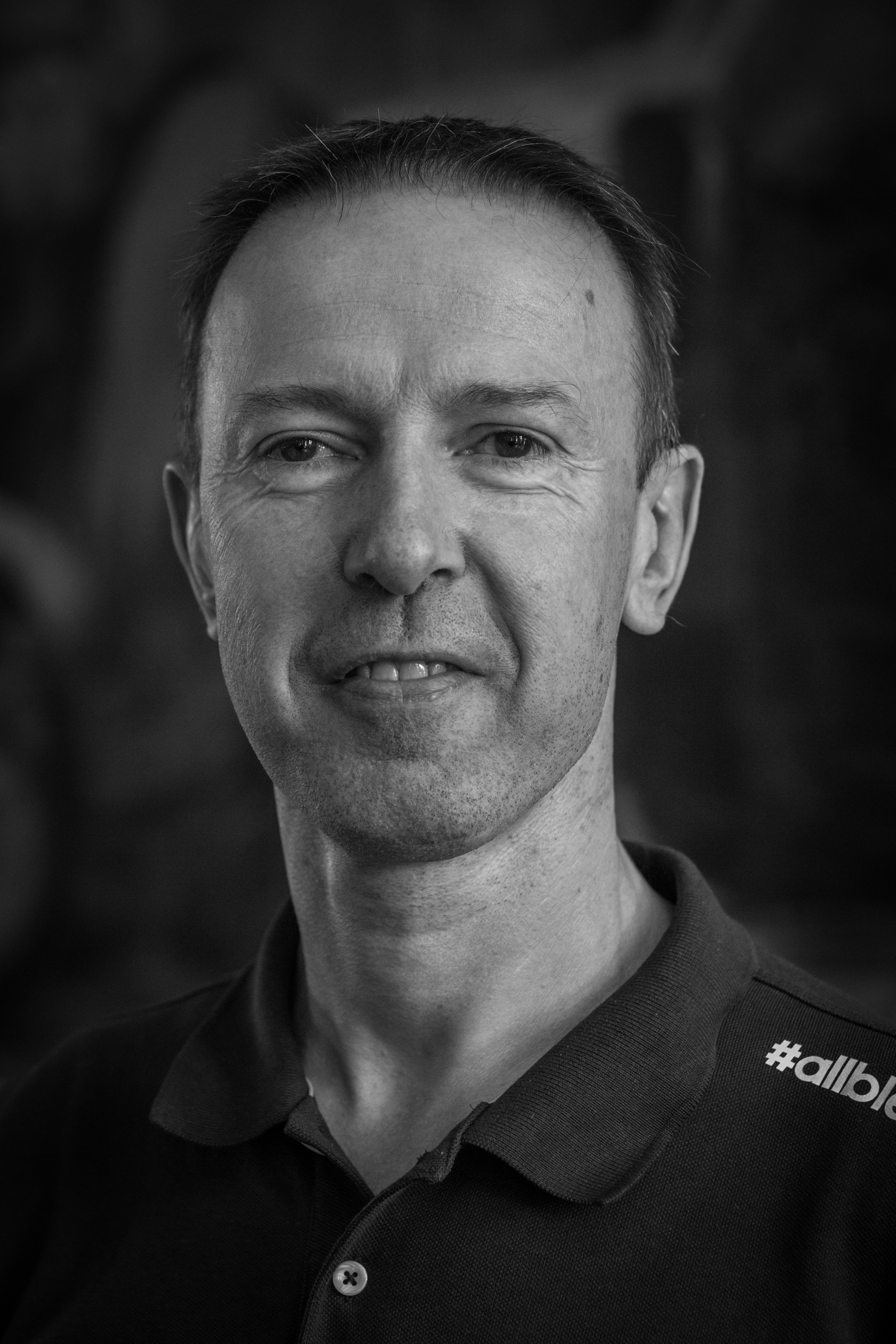
- Collet in 2014.

ASVEL
- Title: Assistant coach
- League: LNB Élite; EuroLeague

Personal information
- Born: 6 June 1963 (age 63) Sainte-Adresse, France
- Listed height: 6 ft 3 in (1.91 m)
- Listed weight: 175 lb (79 kg)

Career information
- Playing career: 1981–1998
- Position: Point guard / shooting guard
- Coaching career: 1998–present

Career history

Playing
- 1981–1985: Le Mans
- 1985–1986: Caen
- 1986–1990: ASVEL
- 1990–1994: Le Mans
- 1994–1998: Le Havre

Coaching
- 1998–2000: Le Mans (assistant)
- 2000–2008: Le Mans
- 2002–2003: France (assistant)
- 2008–2010: ASVEL
- 2009–2024: France
- 2011–2020: Strasbourg
- 2021–2024: Metropolitans 92
- 2026–present: ASVEL (assistant)

Career highlights
- As player: French League champion (1982); As head coach: Olympics Best Coach (2024); 2× French League champion (2006, 2009); 3× French Cup winner (2004, 2015, 2018); 4× French League Cup winner (2006, 2010, 2015, 2019); 2× French Supercup winner (2009, 2015); 5× French League Best Coach (2001, 2004, 2015, 2016, 2022)
Medals
Men's basketball
Head coach for France
Olympic Games
Silver medal – second place	2020 Tokyo
Silver medal – second place	2024 Paris
FIBA World Cup
Bronze medal – third place	2019 China
Bronze medal – third place	2014 Spain
FIBA EuroBasket
Gold medal – first place	2013 Slovenia
Silver medal – second place	2011 Lithuania
Silver medal – second place	2022 Czech Republic–Georgia–Italy–Germany
Bronze medal – third place	2015 France–Croatia–Germany–Latvia

Vincent Florent Antoine Collet (born 6 June 1963) is a French professional basketball coach and former player who currently serves as the assistant coach for ASVEL of the French LNB Élite and the EuroLeague. He was the head coach of France national team from 2009 to 2024, winning a total of 13 medals under his tenure. Collet won two Olympics silver medals, two bronze medals at the World Cup, as well as gold at EuroBasket 2013.

== Club playing career ==
Collet began his senior men's club career in the 1980–81 season, playing in the French 3rd-tier level league, the amateur level NM1, with AL Montivilliers. He then began his professional career, in the 1981–82 season, with Le Mans. With Le Mans, he won the French top-tier level LNB Pro A league championship, in 1982.

In total, he played 13 seasons in France's top-tier level LNB Pro A league, playing with Le Mans, Caen, and ASVEL. He then spent the last 4 seasons of his pro career, playing in France's 2nd-tier level league, the LNB Pro B, with Le Havre.

== Club coaching career ==
Collet first became a basketball coach in 1998. He was the head coach of the French squad Le Mans, for eight years, between the 2000–01 and 2007–08 seasons, leading the team to a 2006 French League championship, and the French Cup title in 2004, as well as the French Leaders Cup title in 2006. While with the club, he was named the French League Coach of the Year in 2001 and 2004, before leaving the team in 2008.

In the 2008–09 season, he promptly led ASVEL Lyon-Villeurbanne to the French League championship, their first since 2002. In the 2015–16 season, he coached French club Strasbourg IG to the 2016 EuroCup Finals, in which the team eventually lost to the Turkish Super League club Galatasaray. He also won his third LNB Pro A Coach of the Year award that season. After that season, Collet and Strasbourg decided to part ways, after his expired contract.

After Strasbourg had a disappointing start to the 2016–17 season, they hired Collet again, on October 27, 2016.

On August 25, 2021, he has signed with Metropolitans 92 of the LNB Pro A.

== France national team coaching career ==
Collet was hired as the senior men's France national basketball team head coach, in March 2009, following a disappointing qualifying run towards the 2009 EuroBasket, that forced the team to qualify through the additional qualifying round. After successfully leading the French national team through the additional qualifying round, as the 16th and final EuroBasket qualifier, he coached the French national team at a major tournament, for the first time, at the 2009 EuroBasket. He led the team to a fifth-place finish, which was good enough to qualify for the 2010 FIBA World Championship, where he also coached France.

Collet led France to the silver medal at the 2011 EuroBasket, then two years later coached the French team to the first gold medal in its history, at the 2013 EuroBasket in Slovenia. France continued to win medals under his watch, earning the bronze medal at the 2014 FIBA World Cup and another bronze at the 2015 EuroBasket.

Collet also coached France at the 2012 and 2016 Summer Olympics, where team was eliminated in the quarterfinals each time.

In early 2020, Collet stated that he intended to continue as head coach of the French senior team. At the 2020 Summer Olympics in Tokyo, France defeated the United States for the first time in its Olympic history, 83-76, in the group stage. The French team advanced to the final where it lost a rematch with the Americans, 87-82, to finish with the silver medal.

In 2022, he coached the French side to the FIBA EuroBasket final, where they lost 76-88 to Spain.

Collet guided France to qualifying for the 2023 FIBA World Cup and being drawn into Group H with Canada, Latvia and Lebanon. They were unexpectedly blown out by Canada 65-95 in the first game, which meant that their next game versus Latvia would be a must-win. Despite leading for most of the game, France lost it 86–88 and were eliminated from the World Cup earlier than expected.

Collet coached France at the 2024 Summer Olympics, held in Paris, and led the team to a second consecutive silver medal, losing to the United States in the final once again. He was named the tournament's Best Coach.

In 2024, Collet stepped down from his role as head coach of the national team, shifting to a role of "special advisor."

== See also ==
- List of FIBA EuroBasket winning head coaches
