= 2012–13 Greek Basket League =

Greek Basket League 2012–13 season
- League: Greek Basket League
- Sport: Basketball
- Duration: 13 October 2012 – 15 June 2013
- Teams: 14
- TV partner(s): SKAI TV, ERT, Nova Sports

Regular Season
- Season champions: Olympiacos
- Season MVP: (Gabon) Stéphane Lasme
- Top scorer: (Greece) Nikos Pappas 441 Points (17.7 PPG)

Playoffs

Finals
- Champions: Panathinaikos
- Runners-up: Olympiacos
- Finals MVP: (Croatia) Roko Ukić

Greek Basket League seasons
- ← 2011–12 2013–14 →

The 2012–13 Basket League season was the 21st season of the top-tier Greek professional basketball league, since its establishment in 1992, and the 73rd season of top-flight Greek basketball overall.

== Teams ==
Location of teams in Greek Basket League 2012–13

Club	Home city
Apollon Patras	Patras
Aris	Thessaloniki
Ikaros Kallitheas	Kallithea, Athens
Ilysiakos	Ilisia, Athens
KAOD	Drama, Greece
Kavala	Kavala
Kolossos Rodou	Rhodes
Olympiacos	Piraeus
Panathinaikos	Athens
Panelefsiniakos	Elefsina
Panionios	Nea Smyrni, Athens
PAOK	Thessaloniki
Peristeri	Peristeri, Athens
Rethymno	Rethymno

== Regular season ==
=== Standings ===
Pos	Team	Pld	W	L	PF	PA	PD	Pts	Qualification or relegation
1	Olympiacos	26	25	1	2278	1744	+534	51	Qualification to Playoffs
2	Panathinaikos	26	22	4	2088	1632	+456	48	Qualification to Playoffs
3	Panionios	26	20	6	1999	1864	+135	46	Qualification to Playoffs
4	PAOK	26	17	9	1905	1843	+62	43	Qualification to Playoffs
5	Rethymno Aegean	26	17	9	1979	1932	+47	43	Qualification to Playoffs
6	Aris	26	13	13	1824	1870	−46	39	Qualification to Playoffs
7	Ikaros Kallitheas	26	12	14	1854	1969	−115	38	Qualification to Playoffs
8	Apollon Patras	26	11	15	1951	1993	−42	37	Qualification to Playoffs
9	KAOD	26	11	15	2003	2053	−50	37	
10	Kolossos Rodou	26	8	18	1838	1971	−133	34	
11	Panelefsiniakos	26	7	19	1880	1991	−111	33	
12	Ilysiakos	26	7	19	1788	2033	−245	33	
13	Peristeri	26	7	19	1785	2079	−294	33	Relegated to Greek A2 Basket League
14	Kavala	26	5	21	1937	2135	−198	31	Relegated to Greek A2 Basket League

=== Results ===
Home \ Away	APO	ARIS	IKA	ILY	KAO	KAV	KOL	OLY	PAO	PNF	PAN	PAOK	PER	RET
Apollon Patras		64–53	95–75	94–72	89–92	80–79	78–66	69–88	71–80	68–65	93–99	87–83	86–76	65–75
Aris	68–64		70–60	64–63	85–73	80–79	75–52	68–84	56–71	68–55	60–82	63–72	70–46	71–73
Ikaros Kallitheas	67–65	79–67		86–71	80–74	76–73	86–66	53–97	72–68	85–78	62–86	80–85	66–55	61–66
Ilysiakos	75–69	62–64	66–64		74–76	82–78	49–65	70–81	62–87	66–63	69–75	72–76	66–64	66–72
KAOD	88–101	84–81	76–69	80–83		72–73	74–66	81–91	60–63	101–77	62–64	89–78	87–75	84–80
Kavala	85–67	77–85	82–83	66–68	60–71		66–70	76–94	71–97	68–66	84–87	70–91	84–79	80–82
Kolossos Rodou	67–80	82–99	69–73	71–63	82–76	72–86		72–88	59–67	78–71	65–70	65–70	77–67	82–80
Olympiacos	80–53	100–65	85–63	113–75	103–67	113–62	70–65		72–67	85–60	87–73	89–64	105–57	88–73
Panathinaikos	91–60	81–62	97–72	101–49	87–70	95–73	93–77	60–64		95–68	75–61	71–61	85–60	92–50
Panelefsiniakos	68–69	76–85	78–65	96–84	74–76	87–74	60–68	76–94	59–77		76–72	67–54	75–62	90–80
Panionios	80–78	82–75	82–75	77–62	75–73	88–71	89–77	57–66	63–56	81–73		82–68	79–65	70–86
PAOK	68–61	84–72	71–48	73–69	77–66	81–69	68–63	76–71	61–71	84–78	59–66		83–68	91–85
Peristeri	76–74	57–68	79–88	83–82	78–76	81–72	91–89	78–92	41–76	77–75	69–91	55–63		70–69
Rethymno Aegean	77–71	68–50	68–66	95–68	88–75	88–79	82–73	64–78	58–85	75–69	78–68	66–64	101–76	

Legend: Blue = home team win; Yellow = draw; Red = away team win.

== Playoffs ==
Teams in bold won the playoff series. Numbers to the left of each team indicate the team's original playoff seeding. Numbers to the right indicate the score of each playoff game.

=== Bracket ===
Quarterfinals
1	**Olympiacos**	**77**	**83**	-
8	Apollon Patras	63	73	-
4	PAOK	71	65	–
5	**Rethymno Aegean**	**75**	**88**	–
2	**Panathinaikos**	**88**	**78**	–
7	Ikaros Kallitheas	57	62	–
3	**Panionios**	**80**	66	**74**
6	Aris	79	**75**	67

Semifinals
1	**Olympiacos**	**77**	**87**	**80**	–	–
5	Rethymno Aegean	62	72	67	–	–
2	**Panathinaikos**	**84**	**81**	**64**	–	–
3	Panionios	61	55	62	–	–

Finals
1	Olympiacos	51	52	0*	–	–
2	**Panathinaikos**	**64**	**63**	**20***	–	–
3rd Place
3	**Panionios**	**80**	73	**71**	**71**	–
5	Rethymno Aegean	74	**74**	60	61	–

- The game was stopped with 1:27 left in the fourth quarter due to flares, firecrackers, and objects that were thrown onto the court by Olympiacos fans. At that moment, Panathinaikos led the game by a score of 72–76. The referees stopped the game temporarily, and ordered the fans to exit the arena. However, about 120 Olympiacos fans stayed behind the VIP stands and refused to leave the arena. That led to the referees cancelling the game, and giving a technicality win to Panathinaikos, by a score of 0-20.

== 2012–13 Greek Basket League Finals ==
The defending Greek Basket League champions, Olympiacos, finished first in the regular season, and faced their arch-rivals Panathinaikos, in the finals of the playoffs, having home-court advantage. Despite the home court advantage, Panathinaikos won the series 3–0, by performing a "clean sweep", after defeating Olympiacos twice at their home-court. The 3rd game was disrupted by Olympiacos fans throwing flash-grenades at Panathinaikos' bench, when the score was 72–76 with 01:27 left to go in the game.

The match officials decided to stop the game, and have the stadium cleared of all fans. 75 minutes went by, and 100+ Olympiacos fans had still not vacated the stadium, so the game and the series was officially called off. A technicality win of 0-20 was granted to Panathinaikos, despite there still being 01:27 left on the game clock.

The events of the 3rd game of the series, happened after the owner of Panathinaikos, Dimitrios Giannakopoulos, and three other men, entered into the referee locker room at the home arena of Panathinaikos, OAKA, during halftime of the 2nd game of the series. Giannakopoulos reportedly told the refs that they would not leave the arena, if they did not change how they were calling the game, with Panathinaikos behind in the score at halftime. Giannkopoulos was later sanctioned by the Greek sports prosecutor for these actions. Giannakopoulos was then banned from entering into any arenas in Greece by the Greek Committee of Sportsmanship, for a period of 6 months, however, he was placed on 3 years of probation and given a suspended sentence. He was however, suspended from entering into the arenas at his own team's games, for a period of 3 months time.

== Final league standings ==
Pos	Team	Pld	W	L	Qualification or relegation
1	Panathinaikos	34	30	4	2013–14 Euroleague Regular Season
2	Olympiacos	34	30	4	2013–14 Euroleague Regular Season
3	Panionios	36	25	11	2013–14 Eurocup Regular Season
4	Rethymno Aegean	35	20	15	
5	PAOK	28	17	11	2013–14 Eurocup Regular Season
6	Aris	29	14	15	
7	Ikaros Kallitheas	28	12	16	
8	Apollon Patras	28	11	17	
9	KAOD	26	11	15	
10	Kolossos Rodou	26	8	18	
11	Panelefsiniakos	26	7	19	
12	Ilysiakos	26	7	19	
13	Peristeri (R)	26	7	19	Relegated to 2013–14 Greek A2 League
14	Kavala (R)	26	5	21	Relegated to 2013–14 Greek A2 League

(R) Relegated

Greek Basket League 2012–13
Champions
Panathinaikos
33rd title

== Awards ==
=== Greek League MVP ===
- (Gabon) Stephane Lasme – Panathinaikos

=== Greek League Finals MVP ===
- (Croatia) Roko Ukić – Panathinaikos

=== All-Greek League Team ===
- (Greece) Dimitris Diamantidis – Panathinaikos
- (Greece) Vassilis Spanoulis – Olympiacos
- (Greece) Nikos Pappas – Panionios
- (Greece) Kostas Papanikolaou – Olympiacos
- (Greece) Vlado Janković –Panionios
- (Gabon) Stéphane Lasme – Panathinaikos

=== Best Coach ===
- (Greece) Argyris Pedoulakis – Panathinaikos

=== Defensive Player of the Year ===
- (Gabon) Stéphane Lasme – Panathinaikos

=== Best Young Player ===
- (Greece) (Bulgaria) Sasha Vezenkov – Aris

=== Most Improved Player ===
- (Greece) Vlado Janković – Panionios

=== Most Spectacular Player ===
- (United States) Brent Petway – Rethymno

== Statistical leaders ==
Greek Basket League stats leaders are counted by totals, rather than averages, and include both regular season.

=== Performance Index Rating ===
Pos.	Player	Club	RIR
1.	(United States) Kevin Palmer	K.A.O.D.	484
2.	(Greece) Nikos Pappas	Panionios	471
3.	(Greece) Vlado Janković	Panionios	433
4.	(United States) William Coleman	Kavala	426
5.	(United States) Brent Petway	Rethymno	421

=== Points ===
Pos.	Player	Club	Total points
1.	(Greece) Nikos Pappas	Panionios	441
2.	(United States) Errick McCollum	Apollon Patras	402
3.	(Greece) Nikos Liakopoulos	Panelefsiniakos	399
4.	(United States) Terrell Stoglin	Ilysiakos	359
5.	(United States) William Coleman	Kavala	359

=== Rebounds ===
Pos	Player	Club	Total Rebounds
1.	(United States) Kevin Palmer	K.A.O.D.	216
2.	(Cameroon) Mouhammad Faye	Ikaros Kallitheas	202
3.	(Greece) Lazaros Papadopoulos	PAOK	197
4.	(Greece) Vlado Janković	Panionios	168
5.	(United States) William Coleman	Kavala	166

=== Assists ===
Pos	Player	Club	Total Assists
1.	(Greece) Vassilis Spanoulis	Olympiacos	143
2.	(Greece) Nikos Liakopoulos	Panelefsiniakos	121
3.	(Greece) Dimitris Diamantidis	Panathinaikos	117
4.	(Greece) Nondas Papantoniou	Peristeri	91
5.	(Greece) Alekos Petroulas	Peristeri	82

== Clubs in international competitions ==
Team	Competition	Result
Olympiacos	EuroLeague	Final-4, 1st place
Panathinaikos	EuroLeague	Playoffs, Quarterfinals
Panionios	EuroCup	Regular season, 4th place
