= 2013–14 Greek Basket League =

2013–14 Greek Basket League season
- League: Greek Basket League
- Sport: Basketball
- Duration: 12 October 2013 – 4 June 2014
- Teams: 14
- TV partner(s): SKAI TV, NERIT, Nova Sports

Regular Season
- Season champions: Panathinaikos
- Season MVP: (Greece) Dimitris Diamantidis
- Top scorer: (United States) Errick McCollum 446 Points (17.9 PPG)

Playoffs

Finals
- Champions: Panathinaikos
- Runners-up: Olympiacos
- Finals MVP: (Greece) Dimitris Diamantidis

Greek Basket League seasons
- ← 2012–13 2014–15 →

The 2013–14 Basket League season was the 22nd season of the top-tier Greek professional basketball league, since its establishment in 1992, and the 74th season of top-flight Greek basketball overall.

== Previous 2012–13 season's results ==
- Relegated to Greek A2 Basketball League
  - Peristeri (13th place)
  - Kavala (14th place)
- Promoted from Greek A2 Basketball League
  - AENK (Champion)
  - Trikala Aries (2nd place)

=== Teams, venues, and locations ===
Club	Position 2012–13	Season In League	Greek League Arena	Capacity	Head coach
AENK	1st (A2)	1st	Zirineio Indoor Hall	1,500	(Greece) Ilias Papatheodorou
Apollon Patras	8th	29th	Apollon Patras Indoor Hall, Patras	3,500	(Greece) Nikos Vetoulas
Aris	6th	60th	Alexandrio Melathron, Thessaloniki	5,500	(Serbia) Milan Minić
Ikaros Chalkidas	7th	4th	Tasos Kampouris Kanithou Indoor Hall, Chalkida	1,620	(Greece) Dimitrios Priftis
Ilysiakos	12th	8th	Ilissia Indoor Hall, Zografou	1,700	(Greece) Dimitris Liogas
KAOD	9th	4th	Drama Indoor Hall, Drama	1,700	(Bosnia and Herzegovina) Nenad Marković
Kolossos	10th	8th	Venetoklio Indoor Hall, Rhodes	1,242	(Greece) Vassilis Fragkias
Olympiacos	2nd	61st	Peace and Friendship Stadium, Piraeus	12,000	(Greece) Georgios Bartzokas
Panathinaikos	1st	64th	OAKA Indoor Hall, Marousi	19,250	(Greece) Fragiskos Alvertis
Panelefsiniakos	11th	2nd	Elefsina Indoor Hall, Eleusis	1,100	(Greece) Giorgos Skarafingas
Panionios	3rd	47th	Nea Smyrni Indoor Hall, Nea Smyrni	1,832	(Greece) Ioannis Sfairopoulos
PAOK	5th	57th	PAOK Sports Arena, Pylaia	8,500	(Greece) Soulis Markopoulos
Rethymno Aegean	4th	4th	Rethymno Indoor Hall, Rethymno	1,600	(Greece) Thanasis Giaples
Trikala Aries	2nd (A2)	1st	Trikala Indoor Hall, Trikala	2,500	(Greece) Kostas Flevarakis

Location of teams in Greek Basket League 2013–14

== Regular season ==
=== League table ===
Pos	Team	Pld	W	L	PF	PA	PD	Pts	Qualification or relegation
1	Panathinaikos	26	25	1	2073	1648	+425	51	Qualification to Playoffs
2	Olympiacos	26	24	2	2119	1681	+438	48 (Note: Olympiacos started the season with a -2 points penalty in the standings.)	Qualification to Playoffs
3	Panionios	26	18	8	1938	1826	+112	44	Qualification to Playoffs
4	PAOK	26	15	11	2064	1986	+78	41	Qualification to Playoffs
5	Nea Kifissia	26	14	12	1880	1884	−4	40	Qualification to Playoffs
6	KAOD	26	13	13	2003	2021	−18	39	Qualification to Playoffs
7	Aris	26	12	14	1807	1802	+5	38	Qualification to Playoffs
8	Apollon Patras	26	11	15	1874	1960	−86	37	Qualification to Playoffs
9	Rethymno Aegean	26	10	16	1927	2023	−96	36	
10	Kolossos Rodou	26	10	16	1820	1956	−136	36	
11	Trikala Aries	26	9	17	1927	2046	−119	35	
12	Panelefsiniakos	26	7	19	1782	1980	−198	33	
13	Ilysiakos	26	7	19	1788	1945	−157	33	Relegated to Greek A2 Basket League
14	Ikaros Chalkidas	26	7	19	1876	2120	−244	33	Relegated to Greek A2 Basket League

=== Results ===
Home \ Away	APO	ARIS	IKA	ILY	KAO	KOL	NEA	OLY	PAO	PNF	PAN	PAOK	RET	TRI
Apollon Patras		76–78	71–65	80–65	62–64	76–66	75–67	67–76	79–95	70–69	81–89	77–81	82–73	67–74
Aris	67–75		84–67	75–64	77–59	57–68	67–65	59–64	59–75	75–61	63–65	75–79	73–67	88–57
Ikaros Chalkidas	72–64	77–88		72–71	89–73	96–88	83–81	64–87	64–85	74–84	73–80	78–86	89–78	81–74
Ilysiakos	67–76	51–63	79–71		70–74	74–62	71–65	57–78	60–87	84–75	73–87	78–77	86–72	69–59
KAOD	81–83	58–66	96–79	76–73		76–79	76–77	75–69	85–87	81–68	76–63	90–85	83–82	83–70
Kolossos Rodou	82–84	72–69	70–64	72–60	70–76		62–59	61–94	58–73	67–57	75–64	62–49	66–76	76–72
Nea Kifissia	72–54	81–74	75–66	81–66	84–95	80–74		67–75	65–88	81–73	64–60	95–86	84–76	97–85
Olympiacos	93–71	93–61	99–61	83–73	83–71	77–68	69–64		55–45	94–64	76–66	78–70	105–64	84–45
Panathinaikos	81–73	71–59	77–61	83–77	93–72	102–69	72–59	58–48		74–35	90–65	81–61	76–61	83–63
Panelefsiniakos	66–73	72–60	71–60	73–58	73–67	97–69	63–71	63–101	54–76		72–74	56–79	72–87	94–77
Panionios	79–47	63–68	89–54	69–64	77–71	73–66	64–39	66–77	64–69	92–70		95–92	74–66	69–62
PAOK	78–74	56–49	88–74	84–49	82–65	88–81	92–83	72–74	71–82	81–72	91–100		97–90	82–77
Rethymno Aegean	92–72	84–77	82–77	63–62	77–72	86–67	54–55	79–103	63–82	85–69	91–100	64–81		79–77
Trikala Aries	68–65	82–76	100–65	88–87	103–108	77–70	64–69	70–84	68–88	70–59	83–84	87–76	75–63	

Source: ESAKE Fixtures
Legend: Blue = home team win; Yellow = draw; Red = away team win.

== Playoffs ==
Teams in bold won the playoff series. Numbers to the left of each team indicate the team's original playoff seeding. Numbers to the right indicate the score of each playoff game.

=== Bracket ===
Quarterfinals
1	**Panathinaikos**	**88**	**82**
8	Apollon Patras	61	67
4	**PAOK**	**70**	**79**
5	AENK	66	75
2	**Olympiacos**	**77**	**74**
7	Aris	44	59
3	**Panionios**	**83**	**81**
6	KAOD	73	71

Semifinals
1	**Panathinaikos**	**89**	**83**	**72**
4	PAOK	83	77	65
2	**Olympiacos**	**78**	**84**	**93**
3	Panionios	43	58	90

Finals
1	**Panathinaikos**	**59**	64	64	**67**	**82**
2	Olympiacos	56	**89**	**69**	65	71
3rd Place
4	**PAOK**	**65**	**81**	57	**84**
3	Panionios	60	63	**75**	80

== Final league standings ==
Pos	Team	Pld	W	L	Qualification or relegation
1	Panathinaikos	36	33	3	2014–15 Euroleague Regular Season
2	Olympiacos	36	31	5	2014–15 Euroleague Regular Season
3	PAOK	35	20	15	2014–15 Eurocup Regular Season
4	Panionios	35	21	14	
5	Nea Kifissia	28	14	14	
6	KAOD	28	13	15	
7	Aris	28	12	16	
8	Apollon Patras	28	11	17	
9	Rethymno Aegean	26	10	16	
10	Kolossos Rodou	26	10	16	
11	Trikala Aries	26	9	17	
12	Panelefsiniakos	26	7	19	
13	Ilysiakos (R)	26	7	19	Relegated to 2014–15 Greek A2 League
14	Ikaros Chalkidas (R)	26	7	19	Relegated to 2014–15 Greek A2 League

(R) Relegated

Greek Basket League 2013–14
Champions
**Panathinaikos**
**34th Title**

== Awards ==
=== Greek League MVP ===
- (Greece) Dimitris Diamantidis – Panathinaikos

=== Greek League Finals MVP ===
- (Greece) Dimitris Diamantidis – Panathinaikos

=== All-Greek League Team ===
- (United States) D. J. Cooper – PAOK
- (Greece) Dimitris Diamantidis – Panathinaikos
- (Lithuania) Jonas Mačiulis – Panathinaikos
- (Greece) Giorgos Printezis – Olympiacos
- (Gabon) Stéphane Lasme – Panathinaikos

=== Best Coach ===
- (Greece) Soulis Markopoulos – PAOK

=== Defensive Player of the Year ===
- (Gabon) Stephane Lasme – Panathinaikos

=== Best Young Player ===
- (Greece) (Bulgaria) Sasha Vezenkov – Aris

=== Most Improved Player ===
- (Greece) Giorgos Bogris – PAOK

== Statistical leaders ==
Greek Basket League stats leaders are counted by totals, rather than averages, and include both regular season.

=== Performance Index Rating ===
Pos.	Player	Club	PIR
**1.**	(United States) **Chris Evans**	Trikala	**460**
2.	(United States) Errick McCollum	Panionios	436
3.	(United States) D. J. Cooper	PAOK	407
4.	(United States) Nate Bowie	Trikala	405
5.	(United States) Kenny Gabriel	Rethymno	397

=== Points ===
Pos.	Player	Club	Total points
**1.**	(United States) **Errick McCollum**	Panionios	**466**
2.	(United States) Chris Evans	Trikala	412
3.	(United States) J'Covan Brown	K.A.O.D.	397
4.	(United States) Ivan Aska	Ikaros	380
5.	(United States) Lazeric Jones	K.A.O.D.	357

=== Rebounds ===
Pos.	Player	Club	Total Rebounds
**1.**	(United States) **Kenny Gabriel**	Rethymno	**243**
2.	(Serbia) Nikola Marković	K.A.O.D.	436
3.	(United States) Dominik Saton	Ikaros	407
4.	(United States) Chris Evans	Trikala	405
5.	(United States) Nate Bowie	Trikala	397

=== Assists ===
Pos	Player	Club	Total Assists
**1.**	(United States) **D. J. Cooper**	PAOK	**172**
2.	(Greece) Ioannis Gagaloudis	Ikaros	122
3.	(Greece) Dimitris Diamantidis	Panathinaikos	114
4.	(Greece) Nikos Liakopoulos	Nea Kifissia	113
5.	(Greece) Thomas Nikou	Panelefsiniakos	97

== Clubs in international competitions ==
Team	Competition	Result
Olympiacos	**EuroLeague**	Playoffs, Quarterfinals
Panathinaikos	**EuroLeague**	Playoffs, Quarterfinals
Panionios	**EuroCup**	Last 32, 4th place
PAOK	**EuroCup**	Regular season, 4th place

== Clubs in World-wide competitions ==
Team	Competition	Progress
Olympiacos	**FIBA Intercontinental Cup**	Two-legged playoff, 1st place

== See also ==
- 2013–14 Greek A2 Basket League (2nd tier)
