= Stéphane Lasme =

Gabonese basketball player (born 1982)

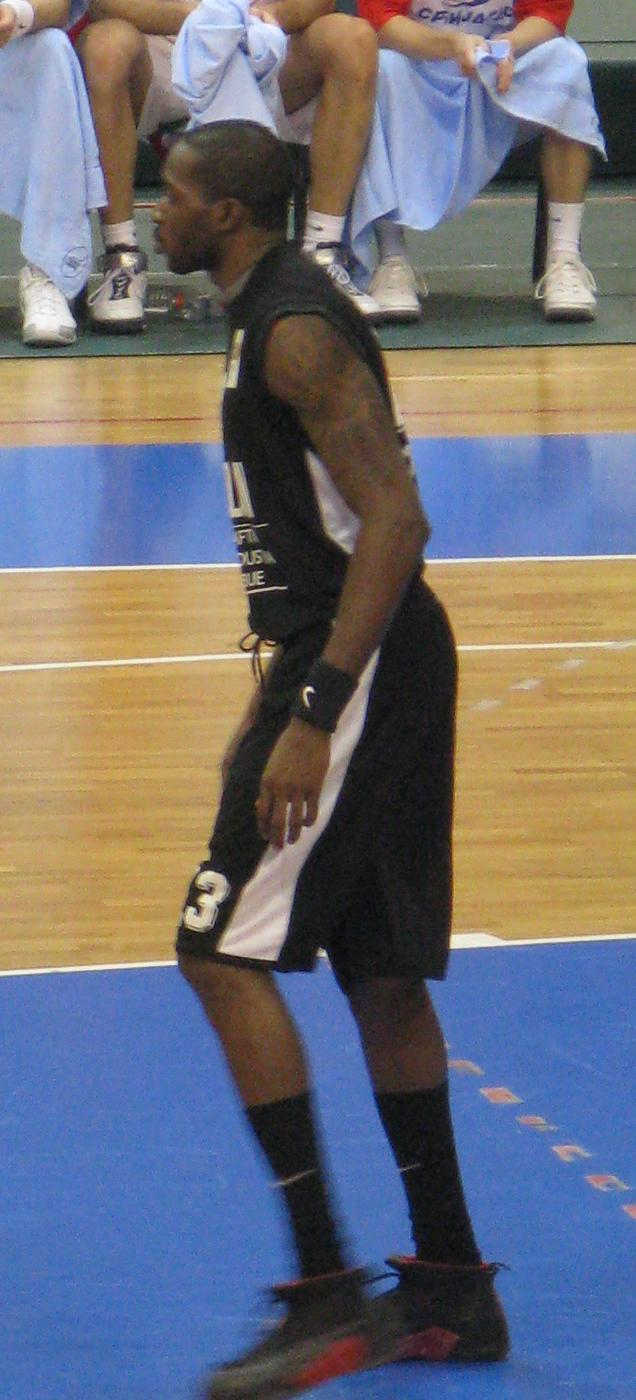
- Lasme with Partizan in 2009

Personal information
- Born: December 17, 1982 (age 43) Port-Gentil, Gabon
- Listed height: 6 ft 8 in (2.03 m)
- Listed weight: 215 lb (98 kg)

Career information
- High school: Léon M'ba (Libreville, Gabon)
- College: UMass (2003–2007)
- NBA draft: 2007: 2nd round, 46th overall pick
- Drafted by: Golden State Warriors
- Playing career: 2002–2019
- Position: Center
- Number: 12, 45, 11, 13, 7

Career history
- 2002: Capo Libreville
- 2007: Golden State Warriors
- 2007–2008: Los Angeles D-Fenders
- 2008: Miami Heat
- 2008–2009: Partizan
- 2009–2010: Maccabi Tel Aviv
- 2010: Spartak Saint Petersburg
- 2010–2011: Maine Red Claws
- 2011–2012: Obradoiro
- 2012–2014: Panathinaikos
- 2014–2015: Anadolu Efes
- 2015–2016: Galatasaray
- 2017: Texas Legends
- 2017–2018: UNICS
- 2018–2019: Panathinaikos

Career highlights
- All-EuroLeague Second Team (2014); EuroLeague Best Defender (2013); EuroCup champion (2016); EuroCup Finals MVP (2016); All-EuroCup Second Team (2016); Serbian League champion (2009); 2× Greek League champion (2013, 2014); ABA League champion (2009); Israeli Super League champion (2010); 2× Greek Cup winner (2013, 2014); Turkish Cup winner (2015); Serbian Cup winner (2009); Israeli State Cup winner (2010); Greek League MVP (2013); 2× All-Greek League Team (2013, 2014); 2× Greek League Defensive Player of the Year (2013, 2014); NBA D-League co-Defensive Player of the Year (2008); Atlantic 10 Player of the Year (2007); First-team All-Atlantic 10 (2007)
- Stats at NBA.com
- Stats at Basketball Reference

Yann Ulrich Stéphane Lasme (born December 17, 1982) is a Gabonese former professional basketball player. He played college basketball at the University of Massachusetts (UMass), with the UMass Minutemen, and he was selected by the Golden State Warriors in the second round, 46th overall, in the 2007 NBA draft. In 2016 Stephane won the EuroCup Championship and earned the Finals MVP award, as well as, an All-EuroLeague Second Team selection in 2014 and won the EuroLeague Best Defender award in 2013, among others.

== Early career ==
On December 17, 1982, Lasme was born in Port-Gentil, Gabon, to Onanga Liliane. He was brought up in Port-Gentil, Gabon, his father being an oil company engineer. His mother, Liliane, was an economist. Lasme knew how to speak French and his native language of Myene in his childhood, but learned some English through high school classes.

Lasme grew up loving soccer, but began playing basketball at 14, when he was introduced to his school's coach. When asked why he started playing the game, Lasme said, "I was growing faster than the other kids my age." One media report stated that he nailed a basketball hoop to a tree at age 15 and estimated the official NBA requirement of 10 feet, but instead put it 12 feet above the ground. He said, "I had a rim put in at my house. It was higher than 10 feet, though." His favorite players as a child were Scottie Pippen and Michael Jordan, whom he used to watch on television by sneaking out of bed at night. He also grew up as a fan of Marcus Camby.

Lasme competed for Aveley Club Port-Gentil, a youth club that was designed to be an after-school program. He attended high school at Léon M'ba in his native Gabon and was called up by Arimbi Nkolo, head coach of his country's national team. While at Léon M'ba, whose basketball team competed in the African High School Federation, he played under Ebolo Firmin. Lasme also played for Capo Libreville in the 2002 FIBA Africa Basketball Club Championship.

== College career ==
In February 2003 Lasme moved to the United States. Lasme's cousin, Serge Lapeby gave him a home in Boston. He helped him adjust to the new environment, saying, "He had to learn the culture, the language, the colder weather—that was a bit of a challenge—and the lifestyle." He was forced to compete in a gymnasium, as he arrived in the United States in the winter, and played in Emmanuel College. Lapeby tried to recruit Lasme to play for the school's team, and succeeded, but it did not offer athletic scholarships as an NCAA Division III college.

Lasme subsequently enrolled in Emmanuel College, primarily for its ESL program. He began playing basketball for the college and attracted the attention of many NCAA Division I programs. Lasme's performance in the Eastern Invitational All-Star Game, which took place in New Jersey, was most noted. The game was attended by Massachusetts Minutemen basketball coach Steve Lappas, who was searching for potential recruits.

Lappas was impressed by Lasme's raw skills and offered him a scholarship to play for the Minutemen. He signed an institutional financial aid agreement to compete with Massachusetts for the 2003–04 season and was eligible to participate in the winter. When the move was made official, the coach said, "We are excited to have Stephane join our program. We believe that he is a quality student and athlete. It is very exciting to find someone of his caliber at this point in time, and we feel he will be a very good addition to our program."

=== Freshman ===
On November 9, 2003, Lasme made his first appearance in a Massachusetts uniform in an exhibition game against the Harlem Globetrotters. He finished with 1 point and 5 turnovers in 9 minutes of playing time, as the Minutemen fell to Harlem, 68–77. He competed in another exhibition game on November 14 against the Playaz basketball club, but was awarded 22 minutes on the court. In his official collegiate debut, a win over St. Francis (NY), Lasme contributed 6 points and 6 rebounds off the bench. He grabbed 13 rebounds in a quarterfinals game of the Preseason National Invitational Tournament vs Texas Tech, the first time he recorded double-digits in any major statistical category at the collegiate level. He also had four blocked shots, as UMass fell, 50–90. Lasme scored a season-high 13 points on February 8, 2004, vs Dayton. He was awarded his first-ever start with the Minutemen on January 18, 2004, against Duquesne, but scored no points. He was named the winner of Massachusetts' Jack Leaman Defensive Award at the end of the season, ranking second in the Atlantic 10 Conference in blocked shots. Lasme finished the year with averages of 3.2 points, 3.4 rebounds and 1.8 blocks.

=== Sophomore ===
As a sophomore, he started all 28 games for the Minutemen, and again finished as the league's second-leading shot blocker.

=== Junior ===
Lasme continued his progression during his junior year. He started 27 of the team's 28 games (Senior Day being the exception), scored in double figures 15 times, and finished the year with a 10.5 average. Lasme was two blocks short of a triple-double against St. Peter's on December 27, 2005, with 21 points, 14 rebounds and 8 blocks. By the end of the season, Lasme blocked a total of 108 shots, an average of 3.9 per game, good for third-highest in the nation. The A-10 honored Lasme with their Defensive Player of the Year award.

=== Senior ===
Lasme's senior year at UMass was filled with personal accomplishments, records, and team success. He was named an AP Honorable Mention All-American, the Atlantic 10 Player of the Year and Defensive Player of the Year. He ranked first in the league in blocks and rebounding, and second in field goal percentage. He scored more than 20 points on four occasions, grabbed 10 or more rebounds on 17 occasions, and 10 or more blocks on four occasions. During the season, Lasme averaged 13.5 points, 9.5 rebounds, and 5.1 blocks per game, and led the Minutemen into the NIT, the team's first post-season play since the 1999–2000 season.

In the 2006–07 season, Lasme tied an NCAA record with four triple-doubles in a single season, joining Jason Kidd (1994 at Cal) and Michael Anderson (1986 at Drexel). While Kidd and Anderson accomplished the feat by achieving double figures in scoring, rebounds, and assists, Lasme's triple-doubles are in scoring, rebounds and blocks. His four triple-doubles were:

- vs. St. Francis on November 22 (19 pts, 10 reb, 11 blocks);
- vs. George Washington on January 10 (23 pts, 15 reb, 11 blocks);
- vs. Rhode Island on February 8 (18 pts, 12 reb, 11 blocks) and
- vs. La Salle on February 28 (17 pts, 10 reb, 10 blocks).

Also in 2006–07 Lasme set new UMass records for career blocked shots (399), single season blocked shots (168), and blocks per game (11), passing Marcus Camby on all three lists.

== Professional career ==
In June 2007, Lasme was selected in the second round, 46th overall, in the 2007 NBA draft by the Golden State Warriors, using the pick they got from the New Jersey Nets in exchange for Clifford Robinson. He made his NBA debut on November 8, playing only 3.8 seconds of game time in the Warriors 120–115 loss to the Dallas Mavericks. On November 17, Lasme was waived by the Warriors. Later that month, he was signed by the NBA Development League's Los Angeles D-Fenders.

On March 21, 2008, Lasme was signed to a ten-day contract with the Miami Heat, whose roster had been depleted by injuries. He later signed for the rest of the season. In 15 games (four starts), he averaged 5.5 points, 3.5 rebounds, 1.5 blocks and 20.2 minutes.

In September 2008, Lasme signed with the Adriatic League champions Partizan Belgrade, for the 2008–09 season. After the opening three games in EuroLeague, he was ranked second in both blocks and rebounds per game. Lasme finished the season well, averaging 10.6 points, 6.6 rebounds, and 1.5 blocks per game, 25.5 minutes a contest, after Partizan's strong showing that ended in the quarterfinals with a loss to CSKA Moscow. He was instrumental in helping the team to another regional ABA championship, with 11.3 points per game. He also won Serbian national championship and the Serbian Radivoj Korać Cup titles with Partizan.

In July 2009, Lasme signed with the Israeli League club Maccabi Tel Aviv, along with Alan Anderson. On June 8, 2010, Maccabi announced that they had released Lasme, after a foot injury had limited his playing time towards the end of the season. In 20 games of EuroLeague play, he averaged 6.5 points, 4.4 rebounds, and 1.4 blocks per game in 18.5 minutes per game. Lasme then signed a two-year contract with the Russian League club Spartak Saint Petersburg in July 2010. However, he was released in September, due to some administrative problems that he had in the United States.

Lasme was invited to join the Boston Celtics for their 2010 training camp. However, he was waived on October 20. Subsequently, Lasme joined the Maine Red Claws of the NBA D-League, an affiliate of the Celtics. However, Lasme fractured his foot just 2 minutes into the team's preseason opener against the Springfield Armor, and immediately underwent surgery. After recovering, he returned to action in March 2011.

In August 2011, Lasme returned to Europe and signed with the Spanish League newcomers Obradoiro CAB. On July 5, 2012, the Boston Celtics announced that Lasme was added to their roster for the 2012 Orlando Pro Summer League and the 2012 NBA Summer League.

On September 29, 2012, Lasme signed a one-year contract with the Greek League club Panathinaikos Athens. He was named the EuroLeague Best Defender for the 2012–13 Euroleague season. He averaged 1.86 blocks and 6.14 rebounds per game, while his team allowed 69.8 points per game, thus displaying the second best team defense in the league. Also, Lasme earned the Greek Basket League MVP award, as well as the Greek League Best Defender award for the 2012–13 season.

On July 1, 2013, Lasme renewed his contract with Panathinaikos for two more years. In May 2014, he was named to the All-EuroLeague Second Team of the EuroLeague. He also earned the Greek League Best Defender award and was named to the Greek League Best Five for the 2013–14 season. Panathinaikos decided to exercise an "opt out" clause in his contract for the upcoming 2014–15 season, on 12 June 2014.

On June 22, 2014, he signed a two-year contract with Anadolu Efes Istanbul. On July 29, 2015, he signed with Galatasaray. Lasme was instrumental in winning the Eurocup title 2015–16, and earned the Eurocup Finals MVP award. On August 29, 2016, Lasme was suspended for one year after failing a doping test.

On February 10, 2017, Lasme was acquired by the Texas Legends of the NBA Development League.

On July 13, 2017, Lasme signed with Russian club UNICS for the 2017–18 season.

On June 27, 2018, Lasme officially returned to Panathinaikos after four years, signing a one-year deal.

In September 2022, Lasme returned from his retirement after four years when he joined the Gabonese club Espoir to play for them in the 2023 BAL qualification tournament. Despite training with the team for a month, he did not join Espoir for their games in Yaoundé, Cameroon.

== National team career ==
Lasme played with the senior Gabonese national team at the 2005 FIBA Africa Championship, averaging 11.7 points, 10.1 rebounds, and 3 blocks per game, in seven games played.

He played his second continental tournament at AfroBasket 2015 and averaged 11.2 points and 6.8 rebounds per game.

== Career statistics ==
Legend
GP	Games played	GS	Games started	MPG	Minutes per game
FG%	Field-goal percentage	3P%	3-point field-goal percentage	FT%	Free-throw percentage
RPG	Rebounds per game	APG	Assists per game	SPG	Steals per game
BPG	Blocks per game	PPG	Points per game	PIR	Performance index rating
**Bold**	Career high

=== NBA ===
==== Regular season ====
Year	Team	GP	GS	MPG	FG%	3P%	FT%	RPG	APG	SPG	BPG	PPG
2007–08	Golden State	1	0	.0	.000	.000	.000	.0	.0	.0	.0	.0
2007–08	Miami	**15**	**4**	**20.2**	**.451**	.000	**.594**	**3.5**	**.2**	**.9**	**1.5**	**5.5**
Career		16	4	18.9	.451	.000	.594	3.3	.2	.8	1.4	5.2

=== Domestic leagues ===
Season	Team	League	GP	MPG	FG%	3P%	FT%	RPG	APG	SPG	BPG	PPG
2007–08	Los Angeles D-Fenders	D-League	37	28.6	.521	--	.755	7.3	1.2	1.0	2.6	10.4
2008–09	Partizan NiS	Adriatic League	28	25.1	.563	.250	.713	6.5	1.1	1.0	1.6	4.2
2008–09	Partizan NiS	KLS	15	23.7	.548	.400	.809	7.4	1.3	.9	1.5	10.7
2009–10	Maccabi Tel Aviv B.C.	ISBL	24	19.0	.642	.000	.703	4.5	.9	.5	1.7	8.8
2010–11	Maine Red Claws	D-League	10	20.1	.449	.143	.622	6.0	.7	.7	.8	7.0
2011–12	Blu:sens Monbús	ACB	34	27.1	.506	.143	.721	6.3	.8	.7	1.9	10.9
2012–13	Panathinaikos	GBL	32	20.1	.626	--	.697	5.4	.8	.5	1.2	9.8
2013–14	Panathinaikos	GBL	33	19.6	.619	--	.764	5.0	.8	.6	.7	10.7
2014–15	Anadolu Efes S.K.	BSL	36	22.3	.606	.600	.800	5.3	1.1	.9	1.3	9.6

=== EuroLeague ===
Year	Team	GP	GS	MPG	FG%	3P%	FT%	RPG	APG	SPG	BPG	PPG	PIR
2008–09	Partizan	19	9	23.6	.496	.222	.691	**6.6**	.7	.9	1.5	**10.6**	**13.4**
2009–10	Maccabi	20	9	18.8	.461	.000	.706	4.4	.9	**1.0**	1.4	6.5	8.2
2012–13	Panathinaikos	**28**	9	**23.9**	**.571**	.000	.767	6.1	.5	.4	**1.9**	10.0	12.9
2013–14	Panathinaikos	**28**	**25**	21.1	.515	.000	**.825**	4.8	.6	.8	1.0	8.9	10.5
2014–15	Anadolu Efes	27	16	19.5	.510	.000	.595	3.9	**1.0**	.7	.8	6.7	7.2
2018–19	Panathinaikos	18	8	16.1	.516	**1**	.679	2.8	.4	.6	.8	5.1	5.1
Career		122	68	21.8	.518	.143	.735	5.1	.7	.7	1.3	8.5	10.4

== Awards and accomplishments ==
=== College ===
- Atlantic 10 Conference Player of the Year: (2007)
- 2× Atlantic 10 Defensive Player of the Year: (2006, 2007)
- Atlantic 10 blocks leader: (2007)
- First-team All-Atlantic 10: (2007)

=== Pro career ===
- EuroCup champion: (2016)
- EuroCup Finals MVP: (2016)
- EuroLeague Best Defender: (2013)
- 2× Greek League Champion: (2013, 2014)
- 2× Greek Cup Winner: (2013, 2014)
- 2× Greek League Best Defender: (2013, 2014)
- 2× Greek League Best Five: (2013, 2014)
- Greek League MVP: (2013)
- Greek League Finals MVP: (2013)
- All-EuroLeague Second Team: (2014)
- All-EuroCup Second Team: (2016)
- Turkish Cup Winner: (2015)
- NBA D-League Defensive Player of the Year co-winner: (2008)

== See also ==
- List of foreign basketball players in Serbia
- List of NCAA Division I men's basketball career blocks leaders
