= Duşan Cantekin =

Serbian-born Turkish basketball player

Harem Spor
- Position: Center
- League: TBL

Personal information
- Born: June 21, 1990 (age 36) Kragujevac, SR Serbia, SFR Yugoslavia
- Listed height: 2.21 m (7 ft 3 in)
- Listed weight: 112 kg (247 lb)

Career information
- NBA draft: 2012: undrafted
- Playing career: 2008–present

Career history
- 2008–2009: Pertevniyal
- 2009–2012: Anadolu Efes
- 2010: → Mersin
- 2011–2012: → Mega Vizura
- 2012–2014: Banvit
- 2012–2013: → Bandırma Kırmızı
- 2014–2015: Mega Vizura / Leks
- 2015: İstanbul BB
- 2015–2016: Galatasaray
- 2016–2017: Trabzonspor
- 2017–2018: Yeşilgiresun Belediye
- 2018–2019: Beşiktaş
- 2019–2020: Frutti Extra Bursaspor
- 2021–2022: Gaziantep Basketbol
- 2022–2023: Pınar Karşıyaka
- 2023–2026: Gaziantep Basketbol
- 2026–present: Harem Spor

Career highlights
- Eurocup champion (2016); Turkish All-Star (2014)

Duşan Cantekin (born Dušan Gavrilović; Serbian Cyrillic: Душан Гавриловић; born June 21, 1990) is a Serbian-born Turkish professional basketball player for Harem Spor of the Turkish Basketball First League (TBL).

Standing at 2.21 m (7 ft 3 in), he plays at the center position.

== Professional career ==
In 2009, Cantekin signed with Anadolu Efes. As a member of Efes, he was on loan with Mersin and Mega Vizura.

On August 2, 2012, Cantekin signed with Banvit.

On September 17, 2014, he signed with his former team Mega Vizura. On January 20, 2015, he left Mega and returned to Turkey where he signed with İstanbul BB.

On October 6, 2015, he signed with Galatasaray for the 2015–16 season.

On August 15, 2016, he signed with Trabzonspor for the 2016–17 season.

On August 7, 2017, he signed with Yeşilgiresun Belediye for the 2017–18 season.

On September 5, 2018, he signed with Beşiktaş for the 2018–19 season.

On December 19, 2019, he has signed with Frutti Extra Bursaspor of the Turkish Super League (BSL).

On July 1, 2021, he has signed with Gaziantep Basketbol of the Basketbol Süper Ligi (BSL).

On August 7, 2022, he has signed with Pınar Karşıyaka of the Basketbol Süper Ligi (BSL).

On July 22, 2023, he signed with Gaziantep Basketbol of the Turkish Basketball First League (TBL).

== Turkish national team ==
He was also a regular Turkey youth national team player.
