= Errick McCollum =

American basketball player (born 1988)

- Errick McCollum

No. 3 – Safiport Erokspor
- Position: Point guard / shooting guard
- League: Basketbol Süper Ligi

Personal information
- Born: January 22, 1988 (age 38) Canton, Ohio, U.S.
- Listed height: 6 ft 2 in (1.88 m)
- Listed weight: 192 lb (87 kg)

Career information
- High school: GlenOak (Canton, Ohio)
- College: Goshen (2006–2010)
- NBA draft: 2010: undrafted
- Playing career: 2010–present

Career history
- 2010–2011: Elitzur Netanya
- 2011–2012: Hapoel Kfar Saba
- 2012–2013: Apollon Patras
- 2013–2014: Panionios
- 2014–2015: Zhejiang Golden Bulls
- 2015–2016: Galatasaray
- 2016–2017: Beikong Fly Dragons
- 2017: Galatasaray
- 2017–2018: Anadolu Efes
- 2018–2020: UNICS Kazan
- 2020–2021: Khimki Moscow
- 2021–2022: Lokomotiv Kuban
- 2022–2024: Karşıyaka
- 2025: Fenerbahçe
- 2025–2026: Galatasaray
- 2026–present: Esenler Erokspor

Career highlights
- EuroLeague champion (2025); EuroCup champion (2016); EuroCup MVP (2016); 2× EuroCup Top Scorer (2014, 2022); 2× All-EuroCup First Team (2016, 2019); All-FIBA Champions League Second Team (2026); Turkish Super League champion (2025); All-Turkish League First Team (2023); 2x Turkish Cup winner (2018, 2025); VTB United League Top Scorer (2022); All-VTB United League First Team (2022); All-VTB United League Second Team (2019); 2× CBA scoring champion (2015, 2017); Greek League Top Scorer (2014); VTB United League Hall of Fame (2023); First-team NAIA Division II All-American (2010)

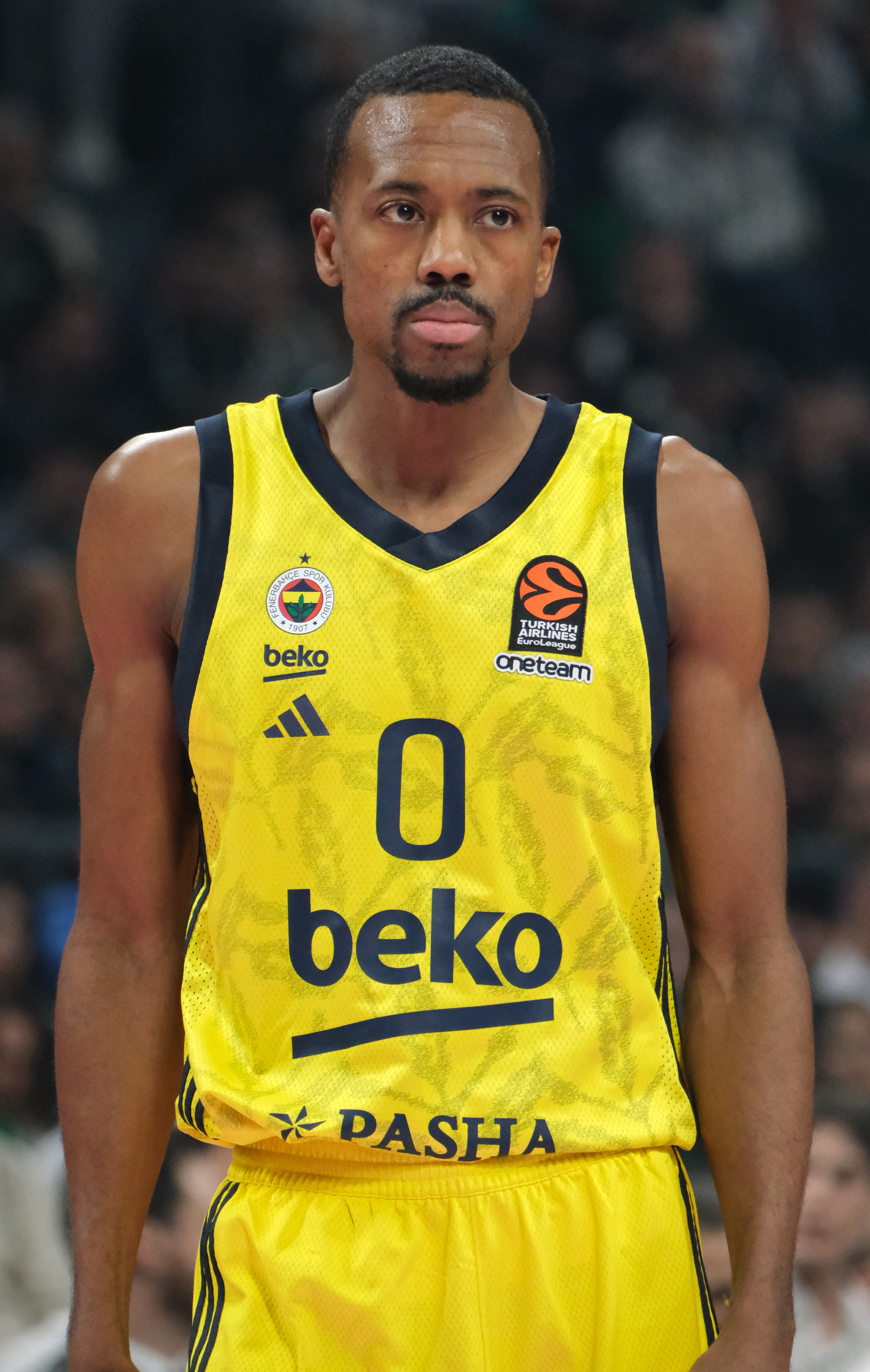
McCollum with Fenerbahçe in 2025

Errick "E" Lane McCollum II (born January 22, 1988) is an American professional basketball player for Esenler Erokspor of the Basketbol Süper Ligi (BSL). He played college basketball for Goshen. At a height of 6 ft 2 in (1.88 m), he plays at both the point guard and shooting guard positions. He is known for his scoring record in the Chinese Basketball Association, where he scored 82 points in one game, the highest in the league's history.

== High school ==
McCollum attended GlenOak High School, in Canton, Ohio, from 2002 to 2006, where he played with former NBA and Ohio State Buckeye center Kosta Koufos. In 2006, McCollum was joined on the team's varsity squad by his younger brother, then a freshman, CJ McCollum.

== College career ==
McCollum played college basketball at Goshen College from 2006 to 2010. He graduated as the school's all-time leading scorer with 2,789 points. He was named an NAIA DII All-American in all 4 years at Goshen College. He was also named a First Team NAIA Division II All-American in his senior season.

== Professional career ==
=== Israel ===
McCollum started his pro career in 2010, with the Israeli Basketball Premier League club Elitzur Netanya. He spent the 2011–12 season with the Israel 2nd Division club Hapoel Kfar Saba, for whom he averaged 23.8 points, 7.6 rebounds, and 3.4 assists per game.

=== Greece ===
McCollum played with the Greek League club Apollon Patras, during the 2012–13 season. He joined the Greek club Panionios, for the 2013–14 season. During the 2013–14 season, he led both the Greek League and the 2nd tier European competition, the EuroCup, in scoring.

=== China ===
In July 2014, McCollum joined the Denver Nuggets' summer league squad, for the 2014 NBA Summer League.

In the summer of 2014, McCollum signed a one-year deal with the Zhejiang Golden Bulls of the Chinese Basketball Association (CBA). On January 30, 2015, he set the new single game scoring record in the Chinese Basketball Association, with 82 points scored in one game. McCollum also added 10 rebounds and 4 assists in the same game, but his team, the Zhejiang Golden Bulls, lost the game to the Guangdong Southern Tigers, by a score of 129–119.

=== Turkey ===
On September 5, 2015, McCollum signed a one-year deal to play in Turkey, with the Turkish club Galatasaray, of the European-wide 2nd-tier level EuroCup. In the 2015–16 EuroCup season, he was named to the All-EuroCup First Team, and selected the EuroCup MVP. McCollum's team, Galatasaray, eventually won the season's EuroCup championship.

=== Return to China ===
On August 1, 2016, McCollum signed with the Beikong Fly Dragons of the Chinese Basketball Association (CBA). He led the CBA league in scoring, for the second time.

=== Return to Turkey ===
On March 8, 2017, McCollum returned to Turkey for a second stint, signing with Galatasaray for the remainder of the Turkish Super League's 2016–17 season.

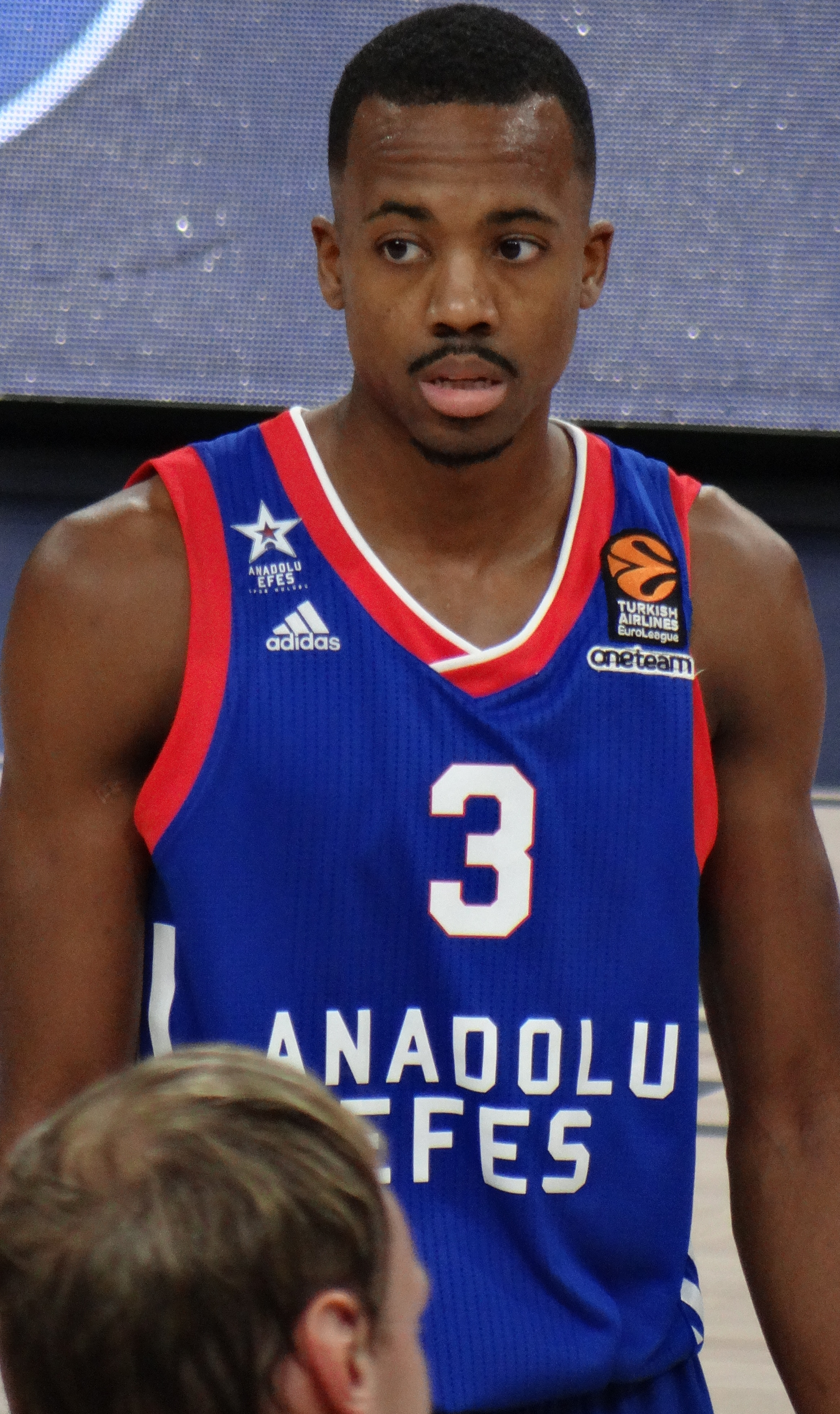
McCollum with Andolu Efes, 2017

On July 14, 2017, McCollum signed with the Turkish club Anadolu Efes, of the European-wide top-tier level, the EuroLeague, for the 2017–18 season. On November 14, 2017, McCollum recorded 31 points, shooting 8-of-11 from 3-point range, along with four rebounds and three assists in a 92–72 win over Maccabi Tel Aviv. He was subsequently named EuroLeague Round 7 MVP. On June 28, 2018, McCollum and Efes officially parted ways.

=== Russia ===
On September 21, 2018, McCollum signed with the Russian team Unics Kazan for the 2018–19 season. He averaged 19.9 points per game in the VTB league. On July 19, 2020, McCollum parted ways with the team.

On September 7, 2020, he signed with Khimki of the VTB United League. McCollum averaged 14.1 points per game in VTB league play.

On August 17, 2021, he signed with Lokomotiv Kuban of the VTB United League.

=== Return to Turkey for third time ===
On June 22, 2022, he signed with Pınar Karşıyaka of the Basketbol Süper Ligi.

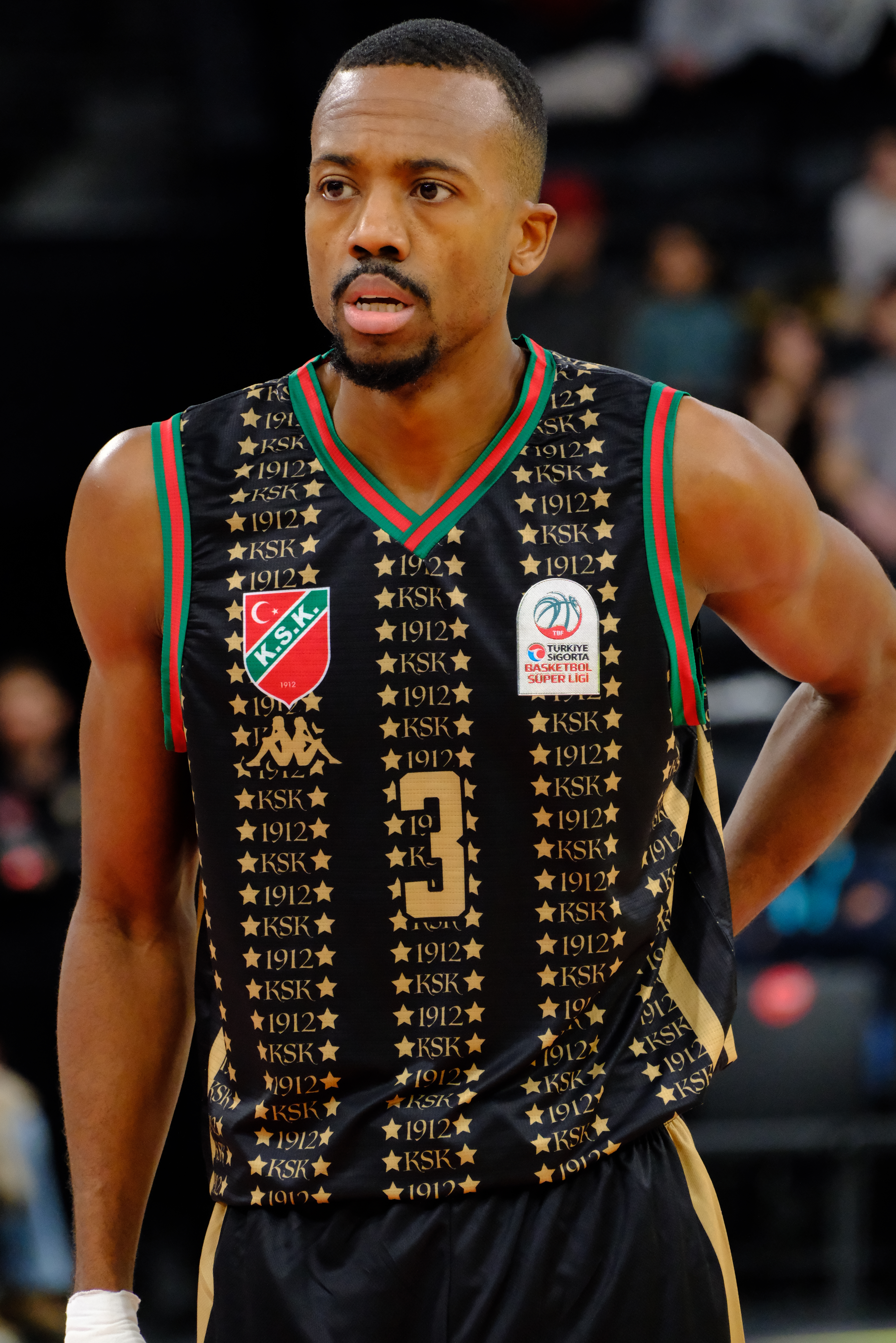
McCollum with Karşıyaka, 2024

On January 10, 2025, he signed with Fenerbahçe Beko of the Turkish Basketbol Süper Ligi (BSL).

On May 25, 2025, he helped Fenerbahçe to their second EuroLeague championship in Abu Dhabi.

On June 28, 2025, he signed with Galatasaray of the Turkish Basketbol Süper Ligi (BSL) for a second stint.

On June 30, 2026, he signed with Esenler Erokspor of the Basketbol Süper Ligi (BSL).

== The Basketball Tournament ==
McCollum has competed with Overseas Elite in The Basketball Tournament (TBT). He was a point guard on the 2015, 2016, 2017 and 2018 teams that all won the championship game of the winner-take-all tournament. In 2017, McCollum averaged 13.7 PPG during the tournament. In TBT 2018, McCollum played six games. He averaged 13.2 PPG, 2.8 assists per game and 2.7 rebounds per game. Overseas Elite reached the championship game and played Eberlein Drive, winning 70–58 for their fourth consecutive TBT title. McCollum was also named to the TBT 2018 All-Tournament Team. McCollum did not play in TBT 2019, due to getting married.

== Personal life ==
McCollum's younger brother, CJ McCollum, is a professional basketball player for the Atlanta Hawks of the NBA. He married in 2019 and has two children.

== College awards ==
- All-Mid-Central College Conference Newcomer of the Year: (2006–07)
- 4× All-Mid-Central College Conference Team: (2006–07, 2007–08, 2008–09, 2009–10)
  - All-Mid-Central College Conference 2nd Team: (2006–07)
  - 3× All-Mid-Central College Conference 1st Team: (2007–08, 2008–09, 2009–10)
- All-Mid-Central College Conference Player of the Year: (2009–10)
- 4× NAIA Division II All-American: (2006–07, 2007–08, 2008–09, 2009–10)
- NAIA Division II All-American First Team: (2009–10)

== Career statistics ==
Legend
GP	Games played	GS	Games started	MPG	Minutes per game
FG%	Field-goal percentage	3P%	3-point field-goal percentage	FT%	Free-throw percentage
RPG	Rebounds per game	APG	Assists per game	SPG	Steals per game
BPG	Blocks per game	PPG	Points per game	PIR	Performance index rating
**Bold**	Career high	†	Won a EuroLeague championship	*	Led the league

=== EuroLeague ===
Year	Team	GP	GS	MPG	FG%	3P%	FT%	RPG	APG	SPG	BPG	PPG	PIR
2017–18	Anadolu Efes	**29**	**16**	**26.5**	.429	**.400**	.775	**2.4**	**2.3**	.8	**.4**	**14.6**	11.0
2020–21	Khimki Moscow	28	3	21.6	.440	.344	**.848**	**2.4**	**2.3**	**.9**	.3	11.6	**11.3**
2024–25†	Fenerbahçe Beko	18	5	18.3	**.583**	.394	.842	2.1	1.8	.6	.3	11.1	**11.3**

=== Basketball Champions League ===
Year	Team	GP	GS	MPG	FG%	3P%	FT%	RPG	APG	SPG	BPG	PPG	PIR
2022–23	Karşıyaka	8	?	**30.6**	.383	.340	.774	3.5	**6.6**	.8	**.4**	18.8	17.0
2023–24	Karşıyaka	**14**	?	25.8	.406	.308	.863	2.5	4.3	1.1	**.4**	15.4	14.1
2024–25	Karşıyaka	6	?	28.2	**.463**	**.381**	**.889**	**3.7**	3.0	**1.7**	.2	**22.0**	**20.5**

=== EuroCup ===
†	Denotes seasons in which McCollum won the EuroCup

Year	Team	GP	GS	MPG	FG%	3P%	FT%	RPG	APG	SPG	BPG	PPG	PIR
2013–14	Panionios	16	12	29.3	.441	.309	.813	3.2	3.1	**1.4**	**.6**	20.2*	16.9
2015–16†	Galatasaray	**20**	10	28.9	.449	.351	.865	**4.4**	3.6	1.0	.5	18.1	17.4*
2018–19	UNICS Kazan	**20**	2	21.5	.438	.353	.835	2.8	1.8	.7	.3	13.2	11.3
2019–20	UNICS Kazan	16	**14**	28.1	.430	.360	.838	3.1	4.0	1.1	.4	17.1	16.1
2021–22	Lokomotiv Kuban	12	9	**29.9**	**.458**	**.414**	**.881**	3.0	**4.3**	1.2	.4	**22.3**	**20.5**

=== FIBA Europe Cup ===
Year	Team	GP	GS	MPG	FG%	3P%	FT%	RPG	APG	SPG	BPG	PPG	PIR
2010–11	Elitzur Netanya	11	?	10.1	.412	.353	.600	1.3	.3	.2	.0	4.2	3.2

=== Domestic leagues ===
As of matches played 9 February 2025

Year	Team	League	GP	MPG	FG%	3P%	FT%	RPG	APG	SPG	BPG	PPG
2010–11	(Israel) Elitzur Netanya	IBPL	15	6.1	.324	.294	.824	.6	.5	.2	.1	2.9
2011–12	(Israel) Hapoel Kfar Saba	IBLL	19	35.4	.495	.326	.773	7.6	3.4	2.3	.7	23.8
2012–13	(Greece) Apollon Patras	GBL	26	26.1	.426	.297	.777	2.8	2.5	1.6	.5	15.5
2013–14	(Greece) Panionios	GBL	26	27.7	.429	.417	.790	2.7	2.8	1.2	.3	17.9*
2014–15	(China) Zhejiang Golden Bulls	CBA	38	40.7	.457	.340	.849	7.4	5.5	2.1	.4	39.6*
2015–16	(Turkey) Galatasaray	TBSL	27	27.6	.412	.330	.840	3.3	3.5	.6	.3	15.4
2016–17	(China) Beijing Royal Fighters	CBA	35	38.6	.484	.385	.827	6.3	3.7	2.3	.6	37.7*
2016–17	(Turkey) Galatasaray	TBSL	9	21.4	.366	.250	.789	2.6	2.3	.8	.9	14.0
2017–18	(Turkey) Anadolu Efes	TBSL	28	30.1	.451	.343	.774	2.9	3.9	1.3	.5	17.6
2018–19	(Russia) UNICS Kazan	VTB	24	23.1	.422	.415	.800	2.0	2.3	1.1	.1	12.6
2019–20	(Russia) UNICS Kazan	VTB	18	27.9	.460	.340	.784	2.9	3.6	1.2	.4	19.9
2020–21	(Russia) Khimki Moscow	VTB	17	22.6	.440	.333	.818	2.1	2.2	1.0	.3	14.6
2021–22	(Russia) Lokomotiv Kuban	VTB	19	26.1	.462	.329	.892	2.6	5.2	1.4	.2	19.4*
2022–23	(Turkey) Karşıyaka	TBSL	27	28.6	.460	.400	.844	3.0	4.9	1.1	.3	19.0
2023–24	(Turkey) Karşıyaka	TBSL	27	24.5	.529	.451	.862	2.6	5.7	1.3	.2	19.0
2024–25	(Turkey) Karşıyaka	TBSL	12	26.9	.464	.434	.981	2.2	5.2	.8	.5	16.0
2024–25	(Turkey) Fenerbahçe	TBSL	2	25.5	.412	.375	.917	2.0	2.5	1.0	.0	14.0

Current season information is written in italics.
