= 2014–15 French Basketball Cup =

French Basketball Cup
- Season: 2014–15
- Duration: September 10, 2014 – May 3, 2015
- Games played: 56

Finals
- Champions: SIG Strasbourg (1st title)
- Runners-up: ESSM Le Portel

Awards
- Final MVP: (United States) Louis Campbell

The 204–15 French Basketball Cup season was the 38th season of the domestic cup competition of French basketball. The competition started on September 4, 2014 and ended on May 3, 2015.

Strasbourg IG won its first title, after it beat ESSM Le Portel in the Final. Le Portel had an impressive run in the 2014–15 competition, as a Pro B team it beat several Pro A teams to go on to the championship game. After the 74–87 victory of Strasbourg, Louis Campbell was named the 2015 Most Valuable Player.

== Quarterfinals ==
ESSM Le Portel	88–86	ASVEL

Le Portel

Provence	68–86	Limoges CSP

Fos-sur-Mer

Denain	69–73	SIG Strasbourg

Denain

SLUC Nancy	72–75	JDA Dijon

Nancy

== Semifinals ==
ESSM Le Portel	88–81	Limoges CSP

Le Portel

SIG Strasbourg	60–50	JDA Dijon

Strasbourg

== Final ==
May 3, 2015
18:30

Boxscore

ESSM Le Portel	74–87	SIG Strasbourg
Scoring by quarter: 19–20, 25–30, 16–17, 14–20
Pts: Donaldson 16; Rebs: Rochford 10; Asts: 2 players 4		Pts: Howard 16; Rebs: Howard 6 Asts: Diot 6

Halle Georges Carpentier, Paris
Attendance: 4,000

Le Portel	Strasbourg

MVP (United States) Louis Campbell Game rules Game was played under FIBA rules. Arena Halle Georges Carpentier 2015 French Cup Winners Strasbourg IG (1st title)
