= Bangaly Fofana =

French basketball player

ALM Évreux Basket
- Position: Center
- League: LNB Pro B

Personal information
- Born: 3 June 1989 (age 35); Paris, France
- Listed height: 2.13 m (7 ft 0 in)
- Listed weight: 107 kg (236 lb)

Career information
- NBA draft: 2011: undrafted
- Playing career: 2007–present

Career history
- 2007–2012: ASVEL
- 2012–2014: STB Le Havre
- 2014–2016: SIG Strasbourg
- 2016–2018: Monaco
- 2018–2020: BCM Gravelines-Dunkerque
- 2021: JL Bourg
- 2021: Orléans Loiret Basket
- 2021–present: ALM Évreux Basket

Career highlights and awards
- French League champion (2009); French Cup champion (2015); 3x Leaders Cup champion (2010, 2015, 2017)

Bangaly Fofana (born 3 June 1989) is a French professional basketball player for ALM Évreux Basket of the LNB Pro B. Standing at 2.13 m (7 ft 0 in), Fofana usually plays as center.

== Professional career ==
On 30 June 2016 Fofana signed a 2-year contract with AS Monaco.

On 30 March 2021 he signed with JL Bourg of LNB Pro A. On 9 October, Fofana signed with Orléans Loiret Basket. On 14 December, he signed with ALM Évreux Basket.
