= Louis Campbell =

American basketball player (born 1979)

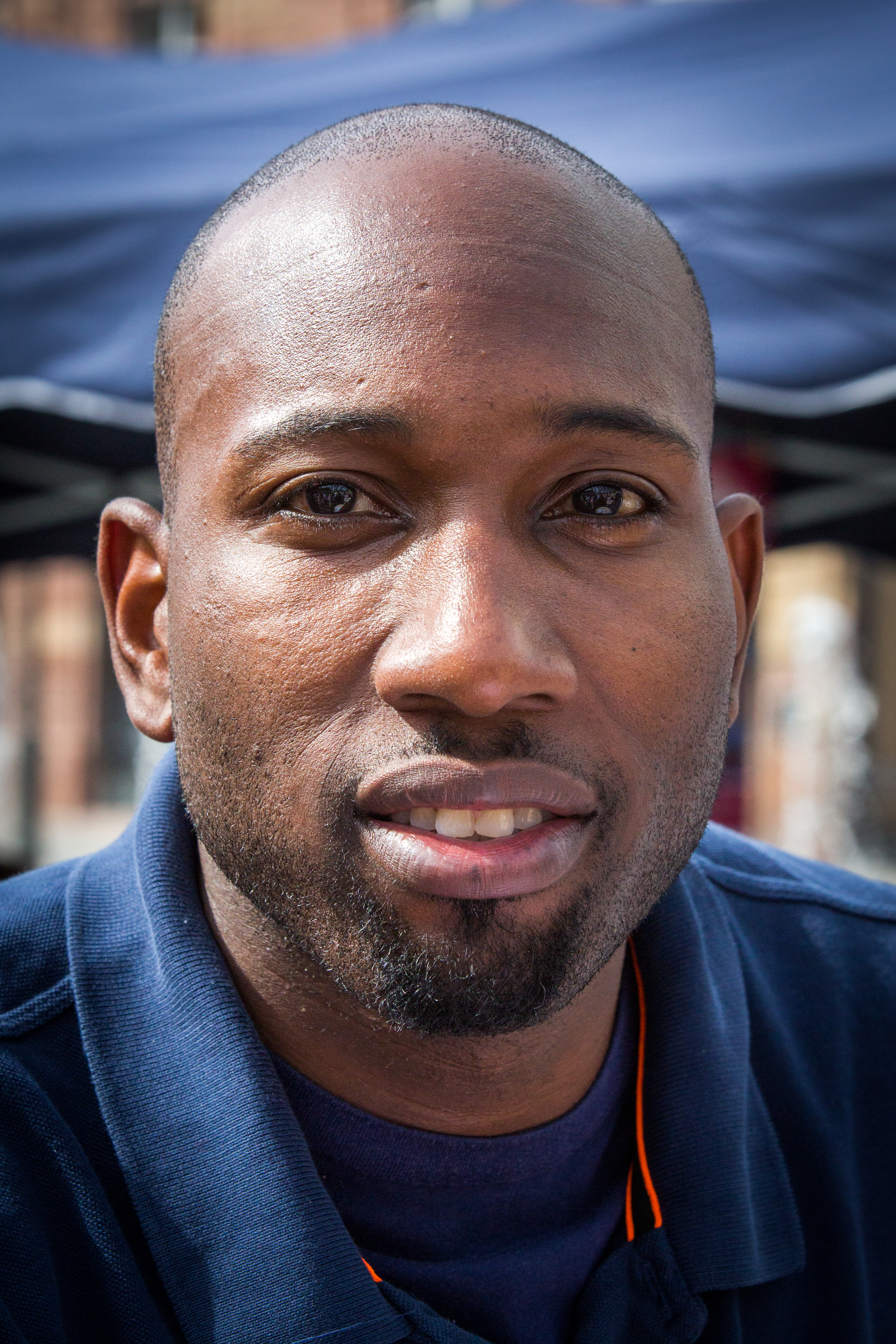

Free Agent
- Position: Point guard / shooting guard

Personal information
- Born: April 1, 1979 (age 47) Rahway, New Jersey
- Listed height: 1.91 m (6 ft 3 in)

Career information
- High school: Rahway (Rahway, New Jersey)
- College: Buffalo (1998–2002)
- NBA draft: 2002: undrafted
- Playing career: 2002–present

Career history
- 2002–2004: Paderborn Baskets
- 2004–2006: Gießen 46ers
- 2006–2009: Toyota Alvark
- 2007: →Ciudad de Huelva
- 2009–2010: Eisbären Bremerhaven
- 2010–2011: EWE Baskets Oldenburg
- 2011–2012: Walter Tigers Tübingen
- 2012–2016: SIG Strasbourg
- 2016–2018: Paris-Levallois / Levallois Metropolitans
- 2018: Fos Provence
- 2018–2020: Antibes Sharks

Career highlights
- 2× German League All-Star (2006, 2011); French Cup Final MVP (2015); French Cup champion (2015); Leaders Cup champion (2015); Match des Champions champion (2015)

Louis Campbell (born April 1, 1979) is an American professional basketball player, who lastly played for Antibes Sharks of the LNB Pro A. He is currently the head coach of the Martinsville High School basketball team in Virginia.

== Professional career ==
After playing college basketball with Buffalo Bulls, he played most of his career in Germany with Paderborn Baskets, Gießen 46ers, Eisbären Bremerhaven, EWE Baskets Oldenburg and Walter Tigers Tübingen. He also played three seasons in Japan with Toyota Alvark, and had short stint with Ciudad de Huelva in Spain. From August 2012, he played with Strasbourg IG. He was named the 2014–15 French Basketball Cup MVP, after Strasbourg won the Cup.
