= Mardy Collins =

American basketball player (born 1984)

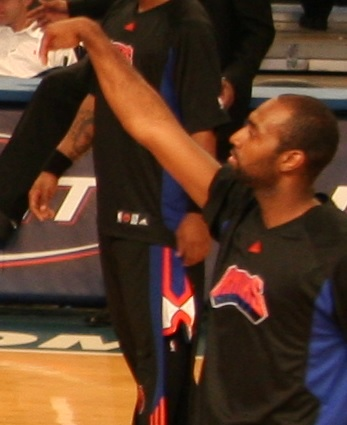
- Collins in 2007

Personal information
- Born: August 4, 1984 (age 42) Philadelphia, Pennsylvania, U.S.
- Listed height: 6 ft 6 in (1.98 m)
- Listed weight: 220 lb (100 kg)

Career information
- High school: Simon Gratz (Philadelphia, Pennsylvania)
- College: Temple (2002–2006)
- NBA draft: 2006: 1st round, 29th overall pick
- Drafted by: New York Knicks
- Playing career: 2006–2019
- Position: Shooting guard / small forward
- Number: 25

Career history
- 2006–2008: New York Knicks
- 2008–2010: Los Angeles Clippers
- 2011: Bornova Belediye
- 2011: Jiangsu Dragons
- 2011–2012: Los Angeles D-Fenders
- 2012–2013: Maccabi Ashdod
- 2013: Guaros de Lara
- 2013: Sutor Montegranaro
- 2014: Olympiacos
- 2014–2015: Turów Zgorzelec
- 2015–2016: SIG Strasbourg
- 2016–2018: Lokomotiv Kuban
- 2018–2019: SIG Strasbourg

Career highlights
- 2× All-EuroCup First Team (2016, 2017); All-PLK Team (2015); 2× All-VTB United League Second Team (2017, 2018); 2× First-team All-Atlantic 10 (2005, 2006)
- Stats at NBA.com
- Stats at Basketball Reference

Maurice Rodney "Mardy" Collins (born August 4, 1984) is an American former professional basketball player. He played college basketball career for the Temple Owls, and was drafted by the New York Knicks with the 29th pick of the first round of the 2006 NBA draft. Collins played for the Knicks for two seasons and then played for the Los Angeles Clippers from 2008 to 2010. Since 2011, Collins has played in various international leagues.

== High school career ==
Collins attended Simon Gratz High School in Philadelphia, as did NBA players Aaron McKie and Rasheed Wallace.

== College career ==
Scouts were impressed by Collins' defense and team play. He totaled 89 steals for his 2005–06 season at Temple University, primarily by stepping into passing lanes. He also averaged 16.9 points per game, 4.7 rebounds per game, and 4.0 assists per game.

== Professional career ==
=== New York Knicks ===
In 52 games played during the 2006–2007 season, Collins averaged 4.5 points per game, 2.0 rebounds per game, and 1.6 assists per game. However, in the final ten games of the season, when he played a substantially higher number of minutes than previously in the season, he averaged 14.7 points, 6.3 rebounds, 5.8 assists and 1.9 steals.

On December 16, 2006, during the fourth quarter of a game between the New York Knicks and Denver Nuggets, Collins committed a hard foul against Nuggets guard J. R. Smith. The ensuing confrontation resulted in a brawl, after which all ten players on the floor at the time were ejected. Collins received a six-game suspension.

He played a career-high 51 minutes on April 7, 2007, against the Milwaukee Bucks, scoring 19 points in addition to 12 rebounds, 8 assists, and 5 steals.

=== Los Angeles Clippers ===
On November 21, 2008, Collins and Zach Randolph were traded to the Los Angeles Clippers for Tim Thomas and Cuttino Mobley.

=== Los Angeles D-Fenders ===
Collins became a member of the Los Angeles D-Fenders on December 28, 2011.

=== International career ===
On January 17, 2011, Collins signed a one-year contract with the Turkish League team Bornova Belediye. In November 2012, he joined the Israeli team Maccabi Ashdod In May 2013, he signed with Guaros de Lara of the Venezuelan League. On August 26, 2013, he signed with Sutor Montegranaro of the Italian League.

On January 1, 2014, he signed a contract with the then reigning back-to-back EuroLeague champions, Olympiacos of the Greek League, until the end of the season. Over 14 EuroLeague games, in which he played as a bench player, he averaged 2.1 points, 1.6 rebounds, and 1.1 assists per game.

On September 26, 2014, he signed a contract with the Polish team Turów Zgorzelec, following the departure of Christian Eyenga from the team.

For the 2015–16 season, Collins signed with Strasbourg IG.

On July 27, 2016, Collins signed with PBC Lokomotiv-Kuban, for the 2016–17 season. On August 17, 2017, he re-signed with Lokomotiv for one more season.

== The Basketball Tournament (TBT) ==
In the summer of 2017, Collins competed in The Basketball Tournament on ESPN for the City of Gods. In their first-round matchup, Collins registered 10 points, eight rebounds and seven assists in the City of Gods' 88–86 loss to Gael Nation, a team composed of Iona College basketball alum. Collins also competed in TBT during 2015. That summer, Collins played one game for TYGTAL and totaled 18 points, 12 rebounds and nine assists.

== Career statistics ==
Legend
GP	Games played	GS	Games started	MPG	Minutes per game
FG%	Field-goal percentage	3P%	3-point field-goal percentage	FT%	Free-throw percentage
RPG	Rebounds per game	APG	Assists per game	SPG	Steals per game
BPG	Blocks per game	PPG	Points per game	PIR	Performance index rating
**Bold**	Career high

=== NBA ===
==== Regular season ====
Year	Team	GP	GS	MPG	FG%	3P%	FT%	RPG	APG	SPG	BPG	PPG
2006–07	New York	**52**	9	14.9	.382	.277	.585	2.0	1.6	.6	.1	4.5
2007–08	New York	46	8	13.8	.326	.250	.605	1.6	1.9	.5	.2	3.2
2008–09	New York	9	0	8.3	.348	.000	.444	.9	1.1	.2	.0	2.2
2008–09	L.A. Clippers	39	**14**	**20.9**	**.433**	**.464**	**.649**	**2.5**	**2.6**	**.7**	**.3**	**5.9**
2009–10	L.A. Clippers	43	0	10.9	.367	.235	.619	1.2	1.0	.5	.0	2.6
Career		189	31	14.7	.380	.299	.599	1.8	1.7	.6	.1	3.9

=== EuroLeague ===
Year	Team	GP	GS	MPG	FG%	3P%	FT%	RPG	APG	SPG	BPG	PPG	PIR
2013–14	Olympiacos	**14**	0	8.5	.324	**.333**	**.750**	1.6	1.1	.3	.1	2.1	1.6
2014–15	Turów	8	**6**	**30.1**	**.418**	.231	.524	**4.4**	**3.9**	**1.9**	**.3**	**12.4**	**12.9**
Career		22	6	16.3	.393	.250	.560	2.6	2.1	.9	.1	5.8	5.7

=== College ===
Year	Team	GP	GS	MPG	FG%	3P%	FT%	RPG	APG	SPG	BPG	PPG
2002-03	Temple	**34**	**34**	35.4	.370	.298	**.675**	2.9	2.6	1.9	.2	12.0
2003-04	Temple	29	29	**39.2**	.377	.290	.598	4.9	2.6	1.8	.1	15.5
2004-05	Temple	30	29	37.6	.416	.276	.644	**5.9**	3.6	**2.8**	**.4**	**17.5**
2005-06	Temple	32	32	37.9	**.432**	**.307**	.596	4.7	**4.0**	**2.8**	.2	16.8
Career		125	124	37.5	.399	.292	.624	4.6	3.2	2.3	.2	15.4

== See also ==
- List of people banned or suspended by the NBA
