= Paul Lacombe (basketball) =

French basketball player

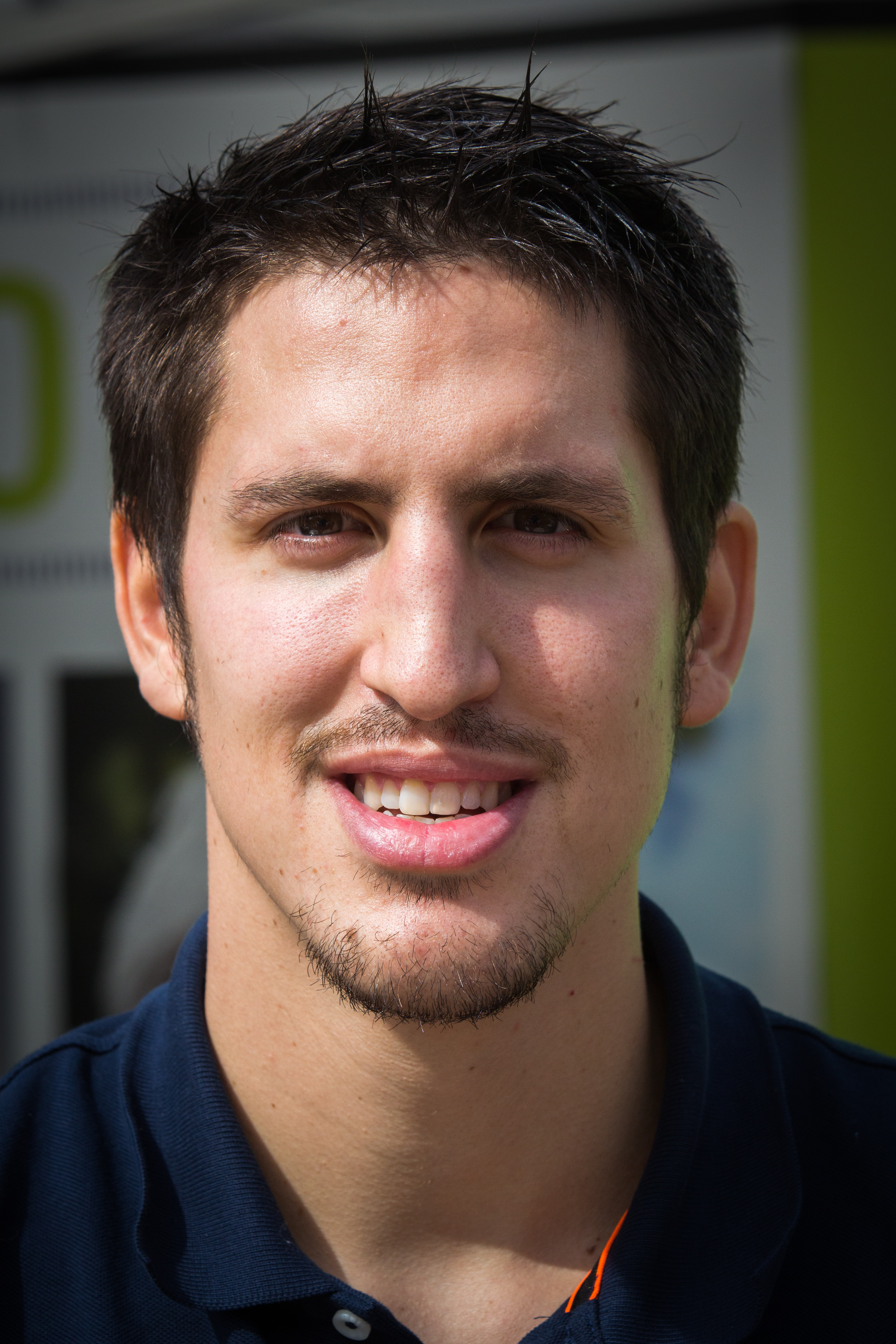
- Lacombe in 2013

No. 6 – Nanterre 92
- Position: Shooting guard / small forward
- League: LNB Élite; Champions League

Personal information
- Born: 12 June 1990 (age 36) Vénissieux, France
- Listed height: 195 cm (6 ft 5 in)
- Listed weight: 97 kg (214 lb)

Career information
- NBA draft: 2012: undrafted
- Playing career: 2008–present

Career history
- 2008–2013: ASVEL
- 2013–2017: SIG Strasbourg
- 2017–2020: Monaco
- 2020–2022: ASVEL
- 2022–2024: SIG Strasbourg
- 2024–present: Nanterre 92

Career highlights
- 3x French League champion (2009, 2021, 2022); 2x French Federation Cup winner (2015, 2021); 3× French League Cup winner (2010, 2015, 2018); French League Most Improved Player (2017)
Medals
Men's Basketball
Representing France
FIBA World Cup
| Bronze medal – third place | 2019 China |

Paul Lacombe (born 12 June 1990) is a French professional basketball player for Nanterre 92 of the LNB Pro A and the Champions League.

== Professional career ==
Lacome won the French League championship in 2009. He won the French League Cup in 2010, 2015, and 2018. He won also won the French Federation Cup in 2015.

In 2017, he was named the French League's Most Improved Player.

On 31 October 2022 he signed with SIG Strasbourg of the French LNB Pro A for a second stint.

On July 30, 2024, he signed with Nanterre 92 of the LNB Pro A.

== National team career ==
Lacombe was a member of the French Under-18, Under-19, and Under-20 junior national teams. While playing with the senior French national team, Lacombe won the bronze medal at the 2019 FIBA World Cup.
