= 2015–16 Saski Baskonia season =

Basketball season

Laboral Kutxa
2015–16 season
- Chairman: José Antonio Querejeta
- Head coach: Velimir Perasović
- Arena: Fernando Buesa Arena
- Liga ACB: 4th
- Playoffs: Semifinalists
- Copa del Rey: Semifinalists
- Euroleague: 4th
- PIR leader: (Greece) Ioannis Bourousis 19,43
- Scoring leader: (United States) Darius Adams 14.92
- Rebounding leader: (Greece) Ioannis Bourousis 7.79
- Assists leader: (United States) Darius Adams 3.19
- Highest home attendance: 15,544
- Lowest home attendance: 6,729
- Average home attendance: 10,330
Home	Away	Euroleague

The 2015–16 season was Laboral Kutxa Baskonia's 56th in existence and the club's 33rd consecutive season in the top flight of Spanish basketball. Baskonia was involved in three competitions.

== Players ==
=== Squad information ===
Laboral Kutxa Baskonia roster
Players
Coaches

Pos.	No.	Nat.	Name	Ht.	Wt.	Age
PG	20	(United States)	Adams, Darius	1.83 m (6 ft 0 in)	75 kg (165 lb)	37 – 17 April 1989
F	42	(Latvia)	Bertāns, Dāvis	2.08 m (6 ft 10 in)	95 kg (209 lb)	33 – 12 November 1992
G/F	11	(Slovenia)	Blažič, Jaka	1.96 m (6 ft 5 in)	96 kg (212 lb)	36 – 30 June 1990
C	9	(Greece)	Bourousis, Ioannis	2.13 m (7 ft 0 in)	122 kg (269 lb)	42 – 17 November 1983
G	5	(France)	Causeur, Fabien (injured) (C)	1.93 m (6 ft 4 in)	90 kg (198 lb)	39 – 16 June 1987
G/F	33	(Spain)	Corbacho, Alberto	2.01 m (6 ft 7 in)	97 kg (214 lb)	41 – 1 October 1984
C	12	(Spain)	Diop, Ilimane	2.11 m (6 ft 11 in)	104 kg (229 lb)	31 – 4 April 1995
F	4	(Spain)	Diop, Mamadou (TP)	2.04 m (6 ft 8 in)	95 kg (209 lb)	33 – 14 February 1993
G/F	8	(Hungary)	Hanga, Ádám	2.01 m (6 ft 7 in)	93 kg (205 lb)	37 – 12 April 1989
G	3	(United States)	James, Mike	1.85 m (6 ft 1 in)	84 kg (185 lb)	36 – 18 August 1990
SG	1	(Tunisia)	Roll, Michael	1.98 m (6 ft 6 in)	92 kg (203 lb)	39 – 12 April 1987
F	7	(Georgia (country))	Shengelia, Tornike	2.06 m (6 ft 9 in)	109 kg (240 lb)	34 – 5 October 1991
C	6	(Croatia)	Planinić, Darko	2.11 m (6 ft 11 in)	120 kg (265 lb)	35 – 22 November 1990
F/C	14	(France)	Tillie, Kim	2.11 m (6 ft 11 in)	105 kg (231 lb)	38 – 15 July 1988

Head coach

- (Croatia) Velimir Perasović

Assistant coach(es)

- (Spain) Agustí Julbe
- (Spain) David Gil

Legend

- (C) Team captain
- (TP) Training player
- Injured

- Roster

=== Players in ===
No.	Pos.	Nat.	Name	Age	Moving from		Type	Ends	Transfer fee	Date	Source
33	G/F	(Spain)	Alberto Corbacho	30	Rio Natura Monbus Obradoiro	(Spain)	Expired contract	2 years	Free	June 29, 2015	
21	F/C	(United States)	O. D. Anosike	24	Sidigas Avellino	(Italy)	Expired contract	1 year	Free	August 24, 2015	
6	C	(Croatia)	Darko Planinić	24	Budućnost VOLI	(Montenegro)	Expired contract	3 years	Free	August 31, 2015	
11	G/F	(Slovenia)	Jaka Blažič	25	Crvena Zvezda	(Serbia)	Expired contract	3 years	Free	September 15, 2015	
9	C	(Greece)	Ioannis Bourousis	31	Real Madrid	(Spain)	Expired contract	1 year	Free	September 27, 2015	
15	F	(Estonia)	Kristjan Kangur	32	Openjobmetis Varese	(Italy)	Expired contract	2 months	Free	October 11, 2015	
1	SG	(Tunisia)	Michael Roll	29	Demir İnşaat Büyükçekmece	(Turkey)	Expired contract	1 month	Free	May 24, 2015	

Total spending: ▼€0

=== Players out ===
No.	Pos.	Nat.	Name	Age	Moving to		Type	Transfer fee	Date	Source
19	SF	(Spain)	Fernando San Emeterio	30	Valencia Basket	(Spain)	Expired contract	Free	July 8, 2015	
30	PG	(United Kingdom)	Devon van Oostrum	22	Arkadikos	(Greece)	Loan	Free	August 11, 2015	
11	G/F	(Lithuania)	Tadas Sedekerskis	17	Peñas Huesca	(Spain)	Loan	Free	August 11, 2015	
4	C	(United States)	Colton Iverson	26	Pınar Karşıyaka	(Turkey)	Transfer	–	August 14, 2015	
	PF	(Brazil)	Daniel Bordignon	19	Peñas Huesca	(Spain)	Loan	Free	August 28, 2015	
18	G/F	(Spain)	Carlos Martínez	19	Fundación Lucentum	(Spain)	Loan	Free	September 2, 2015	
	F	(Latvia)	Rinalds Mālmanis	19	Sáenz Horeca Araberri	(Spain)	Loan	Free	September 11, 2015	
32	G/F	(United States)	Scotty Hopson	25	Foshan Dralions	(China)	Expired contract	Free	September 17, 2015	
21	F/C	(United States)	O. D. Anosike	24	AEK Athens	(Greece)	Termination of contract	–	October 4, 2015	
15	F	(Estonia)	Kristjan Kangur	32	Openjobmetis Varese	(Italy)	Expired contract	Free	November 22, 2015	
15	C	(Slovenia)	Mirza Begić	30	Dominion Bilbao Basket	(Spain)	Expired contract	Free	December 7, 2015	

Total income: ▲€0

Total expenditure: €0

== Club ==
=== Technical staff ===
Position	Staff
Head coach	Velimir Perasović
Assistant coach	Agustí Julbe; David Gil
Physical coach	Oskar Bilbao
Doctor	Alberto Fernández
Physiotherapist	Isaac Alonso; Asier Ugarte
Manager of material	Santi Matilla
Representative	Carlos Toquero

Source: Saski Baskonia

=== Kit ===
Supplier: Hummel / Sponsor: Laboral Kutxa

Home	Away	Euroleague

== Pre-season and friendlies ==
Win Loss

15 September 2015 1	RETAbet.es GBC	74–78	Laboral Kutxa Baskonia	Bergara
18:30 (CEST)	Scoring by quarter: 19–24, 19–17, 24–22, 12–15
	Pts: Doblas 17; Rebs: Olaizola 7 Asts: Doblas, Milbourne 3 PIR: Doblas 22	Boxscore	Pts: Adams 14; Rebs: Anosike, Diop 7 Asts: three players 3 PIR: Hanga 19	Arena: Labegaraieta; Attendance: 500; Referees: Sánchez, Sacritán, Manuel

19 September 2015 2	FIATC Joventut	88–70	Laboral Kutxa Baskonia	Tarragona
18:00 (CEST)	Scoring by quarter: 24–16, 22–22, 20–13, 22–19
	Pts: Paul, Sàbat 14; Rebs: Sàbat, Suton 5 Asts: Miralles 4 PIR: Sàbat 22	Boxscore	Pts: Causeur 15; Rebs: Causeur 5 Asts: Causeur 4 PIR: Causeur 22	Arena: Pabellón Municipal de Salou; Attendance: 500; Referees: Martin Bertrán, Aliaga, Mas

20 September 2015 3	MoraBanc Andorra	85–104	Laboral Kutxa Baskonia	Les Borges Blanques
18:00 (CEST)	Scoring by quarter: 15–29, 19–18, 24–29, 27–28
	Pts: Stojanovski 18; Rebs: Shermadini 7 Asts: Navarro, Schreiner 4 PIR: Stojanovski 22	Boxscore	Pts: James 20; Rebs: Gaye, James 4 Asts: Causeur, Tillie 4 PIR: James 24	Referees: Perea, Girao, Munar

29 September 2015 4	Laboral Kutxa Baskonia	76–86	Dolomiti Energia Trento	Vitoria-Gasteiz
20:30 (CEST)	Scoring by quarter: 18–23, 15–20, 19–22, 24–21
	Pts: Diop 18; Rebs: Shengelia 10; Asts: James 6 PIR: Diop 22	Boxscore	Pts: Pascolo 17; Rebs: Wright 13; Asts: Wright 6 PIR: Pascolo 25	Arena: Fernando Buesa Arena; Attendance: 6,428; Referees: García González, Sacristán, Manuel

3 October 2015 5	CSKA Moscow (Russia)	102–74	(Spain) Laboral Kutxa	Moscow, Russia
19:00 (CEST)	Scoring by quarter: 27–18, 26–24, 23–16, 26–16
	Pts: De Colo, Higgins 17; Rebs: Hines 6 Asts: six players 3 PIR: Higgins 25	Boxscore	Pts: three players 13; Rebs: three players 4 Asts: James 6 PIR: Corbacho, Planinić 11	Arena: Universal Sports Hall; Referees: Jovcic, Davydov, Putenko

4 October 2015 6	UNICS (Russia)	90–86(OT)	(Spain) Laboral Kutxa	Moscow, Russia
16:00 (CEST)	Scoring by quarter: 13–23, 22–15, 18–20, 22–17, Overtime: 15–11
	Pts: Langford 19; Rebs: Williams 8 Asts: Colom 9	Boxscore	Pts: Adams 30; Rebs: Bourousis 11; Asts: three players 4	Arena: Universal Sports Hall; Referees: Zamojski, Davydov, Pavilonis

== Competitions ==
=== Overall ===
Competition	Started round	Final position / round	First match	Last match
Liga ACB	Matchday 1	4th	11 October 2015	22 May 2016
ACB Playoffs	Quarterfinals	Semifinalists	27 May 2016	11 June 2016
Copa del Rey	Quarterfinals	Semifinalists	19 February 2016	20 February 2016
Euroleague	Regular season	4th	16 October 2015	15 May 2016

Updated to match played June 10, 2016
Source: Competitions

=== Overview ===
Competition	Record							
Competition	Pld	W	D	L	PF	PA	PD	Win %
Liga ACB	34	24	0	10	2,987	2,703	+284	70.59
ACB Playoffs	7	3	0	4	523	565	−42	42.86
Copa del Rey	2	1	0	1	159	163	−4	50.00
Euroleague	29	18	0	11	2,448	2,235	+213	62.07
Total	72	46	0	26	6,117	5,666	+451	63.89

Last updated: June 10, 2016
Source: Competitions

=== Liga ACB ===
==== League table ====
Pos	Team	Pld	W	L	PF	PA	PD	Qualification or relegation
2	Real Madrid	34	29	5	3229	2767	+462	Qualification to playoffs
3	Valencia Basket	34	28	6	2831	2501	+330	Qualification to playoffs
4	Laboral Kutxa Baskonia	34	24	10	2987	2703	+284	Qualification to playoffs
5	Herbalife Gran Canaria	34	21	13	2818	2705	+113	Qualification to playoffs
6	Unicaja	34	20	14	2637	2508	+129	Qualification to playoffs

Source: ACB

==== Results summary ====
Overall						Home					Away				
Pld	W	L	PF	PA	PD	W	L	PF	PA	PD	W	L	PF	PA	PD
34	24	10	2987	2703	+284	15	2	1535	1319	+216	9	8	1452	1384	+68

Last updated: May 22, 2016.
Source: Competitive matches

==== Results by round ====
Round	1	2	3	4	5	6	7	8	9	10	11	12	13	14	15	16	17	18	19	20	21	22	23	24	25	26	27	28	29	30	31	32	33	34
Ground	A	H	A	H	A	H	H	A	H	A	H	A	H	H	A	A	H	A	H	A	H	H	A	H	A	A	H	A	A	H	A	H	A	H
Result	W	W	W	W	L	W	W	W	L	L	W	W	W	W	W	W	W	L	W	W	W	W	L	L	L	L	W	L	W	W	W	W	L	W
Position	3	3	3	2	5	4	4	4	4	4	4	4	4	4	4	3	3	4	4	4	4	3	4	4	4	4	4	4	4	4	4	4	4	4

Updated to match(es) played on May 22, 2016. Source: Competitive matches
A = Away; H = Home; W = Win; D = Draw; L = Loss

==== Matches ====
Win Loss

11 October 2015 1	Movistar Estudiantes	58–85	Laboral Kutxa Baskonia	Madrid
13:00 (CEST)	Scoring by quarter: 15–31, 9–23, 15–15, 19–16
	Pts: Štimac 13; Rebs: Hernangómez, Štimac 7 Asts: Salgado 4 PIR: Štimac 16	Boxscore	Pts: Causeur 19; Rebs: Bourousis 11; Asts: Adams 7 PIR: Bourousis 23	Arena: Barclaycard Center; Attendance: 7,120; Referees: Pérez Pérez, Araña, Martínez Díez

18 October 2015 2	Laboral Kutxa Baskonia	82–75	Rio Natura Monbus Obradoiro	Vitoria-Gasteiz
13:00 (CEST)	Scoring by quarter: 20–15, 21–28, 15–19, 26–13
	Pts: Adams 23; Rebs: Bourousis 13; Asts: Adams 4 PIR: Bourousis 32	Boxscore	Pts: Caloiaro 17; Rebs: Pustovyi 5 Asts: Pustovyi 6 PIR: Caloiaro 22	Arena: Fernando Buesa Arena; Attendance: 9,524; Referees: Hierrezuelo, Guirao, Serrano

25 October 2015 3	Unicaja	66–74	Laboral Kutxa Baskonia	Málaga
18:00 (CET)	Scoring by quarter: 18–14, 15–16, 20–20, 13–24
	Pts: Hendrix 12; Rebs: Hendrix 9 Asts: Marković 4 PIR: Hendrix 20	Boxscore	Pts: Blažič 15; Rebs: Bourousis, Hanga 7 Asts: Bourousis, Causeur 5 PIR: Bourousis 19	Arena: Martín Carpena; Attendance: 8,500; Referees: Martín Bertrán, Sánchez Monserrat, Rial

1 November 2015 4	Laboral Kutxa Baskonia	77–67	Herbalife Gran Canaria	Vitoria-Gasteiz
13:00 (CET)	Scoring by quarter: 20–19, 18–17, 21–19, 18–12
	Pts: Causeur 16; Rebs: Kangur 7 Asts: James 4 PIR: Bourousis 23	Boxscore	Pts: Pangos 16; Rebs: Omić 8 Asts: Oliver 5 PIR: Pangos 16	Arena: Fernando Buesa Arena; Attendance: 9,026; Referees: Conde, Perea, Aliaga

7 November 2015 5	Valencia Basket	85–78	Laboral Kutxa Baskonia	Valencia
19:30 (CET)	Scoring by quarter: 20–17, 24–20, 17–23, 24–18
	Pts: Hamilton 20; Rebs: Dubljević 8 Asts: Van Rossom 7 PIR: Hamilton 22	Boxscore	Pts: Adams 29; Rebs: Tillie 7 Asts: four players 2 PIR: Adams 16	Arena: Fuente de San Luis; Attendance: 8,500; Referees: Pérez Pizarro, Bultó, Zamorano

15 November 2015 6	Laboral Kutxa Baskonia	90–67	UCAM Murcia	Vitoria-Gasteiz
18:00 (CET)	Scoring by quarter: 27–13, 21–23, 26–12, 16–19
	Pts: Adams 19; Rebs: Bourousis 7 Asts: Causeur 5 PIR: Causeur 28	Boxscore	Pts: Lima 15; Rebs: Lima 11; Asts: Campazzo 6 PIR: Lima 22	Arena: Fernando Buesa Arena; Attendance: 8,469; Referees: Jiménez, Oyón, Caballero

22 November 2015 7	Laboral Kutxa Baskonia	87–79(OT)	FC Barcelona Lassa	Vitoria-Gasteiz
18:00 (CET)	Scoring by quarter: 17–12, 12–20, 23–20, 21–21, Overtime: 14–6
	Pts: Adams 24; Rebs: Bourousis 13; Asts: Causeur 5 PIR: Adams 25	Boxscore	Pts: Perperoglou 20; Rebs: Lawal 8 Asts: Satoranský 7 PIR: Perperoglou 17	Arena: Fernando Buesa Arena; Attendance: 11,629; Referees: García González, Cortés, Pérez Niz

29 November 2015 8	CAI Zaragoza	66–90	Laboral Kutxa Baskonia	Zaragoza
13:00 (CET)	Scoring by quarter: 25–22, 9–22, 14–22, 18–24
	Pts: Benzing, Sastre 11; Rebs: Fotu, Tomàs 8 Asts: Sastre 2 PIR: Fotu, Sastre 11	Boxscore	Pts: Shengelia 21; Rebs: Bourousis, Shengelia 7 Asts: Adams 3 PIR: Shengelia 27	Arena: Pabellón Príncipe Felipe; Attendance: 7,113; Referees: Martín Bertrán, Castillo, Sacristán

6 December 2015 9	Laboral Kutxa Baskonia	92–98	Iberostar Tenerife	Vitoria-Gasteiz
18:00 (CET)	Scoring by quarter: 12–19, 28–22, 22–33, 30–24
	Pts: Shengelia 24; Rebs: Sekulić 7 Asts: Tillie; PIR: Shengelia 29	Boxscore	Pts: Sekulić 29; Rebs: Sekulić 7 Asts: White 8 PIR: Sekulić 31	Arena: Fernando Buesa Arena; Attendance: 7,824; Referees: Bultó, García Ortiz, Planells

13 December 2015 10	Dominion Bilbao Basket	89–83(OT)	Laboral Kutxa Baskonia	Bilbao
13:00 (CET)	Scoring by quarter: 18–17, 19–21, 15–19, 18–13, Overtime: 19–13
	Pts: three players 21; Rebs: Bogris 9 Asts: Bertāns 4 PIR: Bertāns 25	Boxscore	Pts: Hanga 16; Rebs: Hanga 11; Asts: Hanga 3 PIR: Hanga 18	Arena: Bilbao Arena; Attendance: 9,837; Referees: Hierrezuelo, Calatrava, Aliaga

20 December 2015 11	Laboral Kutxa Baskonia	89–73	Baloncesto Sevilla	Vitoria-Gasteiz
18:00 (CET)	Scoring by quarter: 22–21, 22–20, 20–12, 25–20
	Pts: Bourousis 18; Rebs: Bourousis 10; Asts: Bourousis, James 4 PIR: Bourousis 30	Boxscore	Pts: three players 13; Rebs: Balvin, Sánchez 5 Asts: Rodríguez 7 PIR: Sánchez 17	Arena: Fernando Buesa Arena; Attendance: 7,273; Referees: Pérez Pérez, Araña, Fernández

23 December 2015 12	RETAbet.es GBC	83–91	Laboral Kutxa Baskonia	San Sebastián
20:00 (CET)	Scoring by quarter: 15–22, 29–22, 16–19, 23–28
	Pts: Urtasun 18; Rebs: Wear 8 Asts: Llompart 5 PIR: Grimau 20	Boxscore	Pts: Causeur 21; Rebs: Bourousis 9 Asts: James 7 PIR: Bourousis 29	Arena: San Sebastián Arena; Attendance: 5,302; Referees: García González, Manuel, Mas Cagide

27 December 2015 13	Laboral Kutxa Baskonia	101–79	Montakit Fuenlabrada	Vitoria-Gasteiz
18:00 (CET)	Scoring by quarter: 29–14, 14–20, 32–21, 26–24
	Pts: Shengelia 23; Rebs: Bourousis 8 Asts: Causeur 6 PIR: Bourousis 33	Boxscore	Pts: Stević, Urtasun 17; Rebs: Stević 8 Asts: Úriz 6 PIR: Stević 19	Arena: Fernando Buesa Arena; Attendance: 9,633; Referees: Conde, Sánchez Monserrat, Cardús

3 January 2016 14	Laboral Kutxa Baskonia	86–80	Real Madrid	Vitoria-Gasteiz
18:00 (CET)	Scoring by quarter: 23–15, 13–25, 26–19, 24–21
	Pts: Bourousis 24; Rebs: Bourousis 8 Asts: Causeur, Hanga 3 PIR: Bourousis 37	Boxscore	Pts: Rodríguez 20; Rebs: Nocioni 6 Asts: Rodríguez 8 PIR: Rodríguez 24	Arena: Fernando Buesa Arena; Attendance: 15,544; Referees: Martín Bertrán, Peruga, Pérez Niz

10 January 2016 15	ICL Manresa	76–85	Laboral Kutxa Baskonia	Manresa
19:00 (CET)	Scoring by quarter: 19–19, 18–30, 15–19, 24–17
	Pts: Musli 20; Rebs: Grigonis 7 Asts: Hernández, Montañez 4 PIR: Musli 27	Boxscore	Pts: Adams 15; Rebs: Hanga 6 Asts: three players 3 PIR: Hanga 21	Arena: Nou Congost; Attendance: 4,180; Referees: Jiménez Trujillo, Araña, Oyón

17 January 2016 16	FIATC Joventut	68–89	Laboral Kutxa Baskonia	Badalona
13:00 (CET)	Scoring by quarter: 17–16, 20–26, 13–22, 18–25
	Pts: Paul 15; Rebs: Miralles, Vidal 7 Asts: Vidal 5 PIR: Paul, Vidal 13	Boxscore	Pts: Adams 18; Rebs: Shengelia 8 Asts: Causeur 4 PIR: James 13	Arena: Palau Municipal d'Esports; Attendance: 4,881; Referees: García González, García Ortiz, Martínez Díez

24 January 2016 17	Laboral Kutxa Baskonia	95–83	MoraBanc Andorra	Vitoria-Gasteiz
12:30 (CET)	Scoring by quarter: 25–21, 27–22, 28–19, 15–21
	Pts: Bourousis 26; Rebs: Bourousis 7 Asts: Bourousis 6 PIR: Bourousis 40	Boxscore	Pts: Stojanovski 21; Rebs: Shermadini 5 Asts: Schreiner 4 PIR: Stojanovski 22	Arena: Fernando Buesa Arena; Attendance: 7,328; Referees: Pérez Pizarro, Castillo, Sacristán

31 January 2016 18	UCAM Murcia	68–66	Laboral Kutxa Baskonia	Murcia
12:30 (CET)	Scoring by quarter: 20–14, 14–20, 22–24, 12–8
	Pts: Campazzo 12; Rebs: Antelo, Faverani 7 Asts: Benite, Campazzo 3 PIR: Campazzo 17	Boxscore	Pts: Adams 14; Rebs: Bourousis, Shengelia 8 Asts: Adams 3 PIR: Shengelia 14	Arena: Palacio de Deportes; Attendance: 5,603; Referees: Hierrezuelo, Sánchez Monserrat, Caballero

7 February 2016 19	Laboral Kutxa Baskonia	79–73	Valencia Basket	Vitoria-Gasteiz
19:00 (CET)	Scoring by quarter: 21–17, 13–18, 23–11, 22–27
	Pts: Adams 21; Rebs: Bourousis 11; Asts: Adams 4 PIR: Bourousis 21	Boxscore	Pts: Hamilton 27; Rebs: Dubljević 9 Asts: Sikma 7 PIR: Hamilton 28	Arena: Fernando Buesa Arena; Attendance: 13,059; Referees: Jiménez Trujillo, García Ortiz, Fernández

13 February 2016 20	Rio Natura Monbus Obradoiro	69–86	Laboral Kutxa Baskonia	Santiago de Compostela
20:00 (CET)	Scoring by quarter: 13–21, 24–18, 17–27, 15–20
	Pts: Brown 15; Rebs: Triguero 12; Asts: McGrath 5 PIR: Brown 15	Boxscore	Pts: Hanga 15; Rebs: Tillie 7 Asts: Bourousis 5 PIR: Hanga 21	Arena: Multiusos Fontes do Sar; Attendance: 5,464; Referees: Martín Bertrán, Araña, Sánchez Mohedas

28 February 2016 21	Laboral Kutxa Baskonia	107–77	Movistar Estudiantes	Vitoria-Gasteiz
18:00 (CET)	Scoring by quarter: 35–19, 24–25, 24–15, 24–18
	Pts: Adams 23; Rebs: Bertāns, Blažič 5 Asts: James 5 PIR: Adams, Hanga 18	Boxscore	Pts: Laprovíttola 15; Rebs: Martín 10; Asts: Laprovíttola 5 PIR: Laprovíttola 14	Arena: Fernando Buesa Arena; Attendance: 8,544; Referees: Cortés, Oyón, Munar

6 March 2016 22	Laboral Kutxa Baskonia	108–62	Dominion Bilbao Basket	Vitoria-Gasteiz
19:30 (CET)	Scoring by quarter: 27–9, 31–18, 21–19, 29–16
	Pts: Adams 30; Rebs: Bertāns, Hanga 5 Asts: James 6 PIR: Adams 35	Boxscore	Pts: Mumbrú 21; Rebs: four players 3 Asts: López 3 PIR: Mumbrú 17	Arena: Fernando Buesa Arena; Attendance: 12,341; Referees: Arteaga, Martínez, Serrano

13 March 2016 23	Baloncesto Sevilla	100–92	Laboral Kutxa Baskonia	Sevilla
12:30 (CET)	Scoring by quarter: 25–25, 23–20, 22–21, 30–26
	Pts: Balvin 24; Rebs: Balvin, Bamforth 8 Asts: Miljenović 6 PIR: Bamforth 32	Boxscore	Pts: Hanga 19; Rebs: Hanga 6 Asts: Adams 5 PIR: Hanga 26	Arena: San Pablo; Attendance: 5,209; Referees: Conde, Manuel, Fernández

20 March 2016 24	Laboral Kutxa Baskonia	56–83	Unicaja	Vitoria-Gasteiz
17:30 (CET)	Scoring by quarter: 21–19, 8–19, 10–26, 17–19
	Pts: Hanga 15; Rebs: Diop 8 Asts: Causeur 4 PIR: three players 11	Boxscore	Pts: Thomas 24; Rebs: Cooley 9 Asts: Nelson 6 PIR: Thomas 28	Arena: Fernando Buesa Arena; Attendance: 10,124; Referees: García González, Bultó, Martínez Díez

27 March 2016 25	Herbalife Gran Canaria	93–90	Laboral Kutxa Baskonia	Las Palmas
12:30 (CEST)	Scoring by quarter: 26–26, 15–22, 26–18, 26–24
	Pts: Omić, Salin 16; Rebs: Omić 7 Asts: Pangos 9 PIR: Pangos 24	Boxscore	Pts: James 21; Rebs: Bourousis 11; Asts: three players 2 PIR: Bourousis 23	Arena: Gran Canaria Arena; Attendance: 5,904; Referees: Martín Bertrán, Peruga, Munar

3 April 2016 26	Iberostar Tenerife	93–80	Laboral Kutxa Baskonia	San Cristóbal de La Laguna
13:30 (CEST)	Scoring by quarter: 23–21, 28–8, 17–21, 25–30
	Pts: Richotti 19; Rebs: Beirán 8 Asts: Beirán 6 PIR: Beirán 19	Boxscore	Pts: Adams 24; Rebs: Hanga, Tillie 6 Asts: Bourousis 4 PIR: Adams 17	Arena: Santiago Martín; Attendance: 4,573; Referees: Perea, Castillo, Pérez Niz

10 April 2016 27	Laboral Kutxa Baskonia	100–71	CAI Zaragoza	Vitoria-Gasteiz
12:30 (CEST)	Scoring by quarter: 19–19, 30–11, 21–20, 30–21
	Pts: Adams 24; Rebs: Tillie 8 Asts: Adams 6 PIR: Adams 27	Boxscore	Pts: Jelovac 18; Rebs: Fotu 7 Asts: Bellas 6 PIR: Jelovac 16	Arena: Fernando Buesa Arena; Attendance: 8,239; Referees: Hierrezuelo, García Ortiz, Planells

24 April 2016 29	Montakit Fuenlabrada	97–108	Laboral Kutxa Baskonia	Fuenlabrada
12:30 (CEST)	Scoring by quarter: 20–30, 33–29, 22–30, 22–19
	Pts: Popović 36; Rebs: Popović 5 Asts: Popović 6 PIR: Popović 45	Boxscore	Pts: Adams 41; Rebs: Bourousis 10; Asts: James 9 PIR: Adams 33	Arena: Fernando Martín; Attendance: 4,897; Referees: Pérez Pizarro, Calatrava, Sanchez Mohedas

29 April 2016 28	FC Barcelona Lassa	89–68	Laboral Kutxa Baskonia	Barcelona
19:00 (CEST)	Scoring by quarter: 17–6, 20–24, 27–20, 25–18
	Pts: Satoranský 16; Rebs: Tomić 10; Asts: Ribas 6 PIR: Tomić 19	Boxscore	Pts: Bourousis 18; Rebs: Bourousis 10; Asts: Adams, James 4 PIR: Bourousis 19	Arena: Palau Blaugrana; Attendance: 4,063; Referees: Pérez Pérez, Cortés, Fernández

1 May 2016 30	Laboral Kutxa Baskonia	101–73	RETAbet.es GBC	Vitoria-Gasteiz
18:00 (CEST)	Scoring by quarter: 22–12, 35–14, 22–21, 22–26
	Pts: Corbacho 21; Rebs: Bertāns 8 Asts: three players 4 PIR: Corbacho 25	Boxscore	Pts: Landry 25; Rebs: Landry 7 Asts: Dean, Llompart 4 PIR: Landry 18	Arena: Fernando Buesa Arena; Attendance: 9,683; Referees: Bultó, Sánchez Monserrat, Rial

4 May 2016 32	Laboral Kutxa Baskonia	102–99	FIATC Joventut	Vitoria-Gasteiz
20:30 (CEST)	Scoring by quarter: 28–24, 26–31, 21–20, 27–24
	Pts: Adams 32; Rebs: Hanga 7 Asts: Adams 4 PIR: Adams 31	Boxscore	Pts: Paul 22; Rebs: Llovet 7 Asts: Vidal 4 PIR: Paul 23	Arena: Fernando Buesa Arena; Attendance: 6,729; Referees: Jiménez Trujillo, Guirao, Martínez Díez

8 May 2016 31	MoraBanc Andorra	91–99	Laboral Kutxa Baskonia	Andorra la Vella
12:30 (CEST)	Scoring by quarter: 26–26, 21–26, 22–22, 22–25
	Pts: Shermadini 27; Rebs: Shermadini 11; Asts: Stojanovski 7 PIR: Shermadini 38	Boxscore	Pts: Adams 25; Rebs: Hanga 5 Asts: Adams 4 PIR: Adams 27	Arena: Poliesportiu d'Andorra; Attendance: 3,715; Referees: García González, García Ortiz, Serrano

18 May 2016 33	Real Madrid	93–88	Laboral Kutxa Baskonia	Madrid
21:00 (CEST)	Scoring by quarter: 29–19, 24–19, 22–21, 18–29
	Pts: Llull 24; Rebs: Ayón 14; Asts: Ayón 6 PIR: Ayón 39	Boxscore	Pts: James 17; Rebs: Diop, Hanga 7 Asts: Adams, Hanga 3 PIR: Bertāns 19	Arena: Barclaycard Center; Attendance: 7,751; Referees: Conde, Perea, Rial

22 May 2016 34	Laboral Kutxa Baskonia	83–80	ICL Manresa	Vitoria-Gasteiz
12:30 (CEST)	Scoring by quarter: 15–22, 21–13, 18–21, 29–24
	Pts: Adams 21; Rebs: Bourousis 7 Asts: Bourousis, Hanga 4 PIR: Adams 23	Boxscore	Pts: Simon 17; Rebs: García 7 Asts: Musli 6 PIR: Musli 23	Arena: Fernando Buesa Arena; Attendance: 9,637; Referees: Pérez Pizarro, Martínez, Serrano

==== Results overview ====
Win Draw Loss

Opposition	Home score	Away score	Double
Baloncesto Sevilla	89–73	100–92	181–173
CAI Zaragoza	100–71	66–90	190–137
Dominion Bilbao Basket	108–62	89–83	191–151
FC Barcelona Lassa	87–79	89–68	155–168
FIATC Joventut	102–99	68–89	191–167
Herbalife Gran Canaria	77–67	93–90	167–160
Iberostar Tenerife	92–98	93–80	172–191
ICL Manresa	83–80	76–85	168–156
Montakit Fuenlabrada	101–79	97–108	209–176
MoraBanc Andorra	95–83	91–99	194–174
Movistar Estudiantes	107–77	58–85	192–135
Real Madrid	86–80	93–88	174–173
RETAbet.es GBC	101–73	83–91	192–156
Rio Natura Monbus Obradoiro	82–75	69–86	168–144
UCAM Murcia	90–67	68–66	156–135
Unicaja	56–83	66–74	130–149
Valencia Basket	79–73	85–78	157–158

=== ACB Playoffs ===
Win Loss

==== Quarterfinals ====
27 May 2016 1st leg	Laboral Kutxa Baskonia	81–76	Herbalife Gran Canaria	Vitoria-Gasteiz
19:30 (CEST)	Scoring by quarter: 13–17, 18–15, 27–16, 23–28
	Pts: Adams 24; Rebs: Bourousis 12; Asts: Adams, James 4 PIR: Adams 23	Boxscore	Pts: Seeley 18; Rebs: Omić 7 Asts: three players 4 PIR: Seeley 22	Arena: Fernando Buesa Arena; Attendance: 9,634; Referees: Martín Bertrán, Peruga, Fernández

29 May 2016 2nd leg	Herbalife Gran Canaria	93–87	Laboral Kutxa Baskonia	Las Palmas
12:30 (WEST)	Scoring by quarter: 23–20, 26–17, 22–25, 22–25
	Pts: Oliver 13; Rebs: Aguilar 7 Asts: Pangos 6 PIR: Oliver 15	Boxscore	Pts: Adams 22; Rebs: Bourousis 9 Asts: Adams 7 PIR: Bourousis 28	Arena: Gran Canaria Arena; Attendance: 6,732; Referees: Pérez Pérez, Bultó, Oyón

31 May 2016 3rd leg	Laboral Kutxa Baskonia	78–71	Herbalife Gran Canaria	Vitoria-Gasteiz
20:30 (CEST)	Scoring by quarter: 18–20, 22–21, 21–13, 17–17
	Pts: Bourousis 17; Rebs: Bourousis 11; Asts: Adams, Bourousis 4 PIR: Bourousis 28	Boxscore	Pts: Báez, Pangos 13; Rebs: Omić 6 Asts: Pangos 5 PIR: Pangos 17	Arena: Fernando Buesa Arena; Attendance: 12,683; Referees: Conde, Jiménez, Cortés

==== Semifinals ====
3 June 2016 1st leg	FC Barcelona Lassa	84–57	Laboral Kutxa Baskonia	Barcelona
21:00 (CEST)	Scoring by quarter: 16–9, 27–19, 24–15, 17–14
	Pts: Tomić 14; Rebs: Samuels 8 Asts: Tomić 4 PIR: Satoranský, Tomić 22	Boxscore	Pts: Hanga 15; Rebs: Hanga 8 Asts: James 4 PIR: Hanga 24	Arena: Palau Blaugrana; Attendance: 5,547; Referees: Hierrezuelo, Jiménez, Araña

5 June 2016 2nd leg	FC Barcelona Lassa	73–68	Laboral Kutxa Baskonia	Barcelona
12:30 (CEST)	Scoring by quarter: 25–17, 15–18, 12–21, 21–12
	Pts: Perperoglou 11; Rebs: Perperoglou, Tomić 5 Asts: Tomić 4 PIR: Perperoglou 15	Boxscore	Pts: James 15; Rebs: Tillie 7 Asts: James 4 PIR: James 19	Arena: Palau Blaugrana; Attendance: 5,027; Referees: Pérez Pizarro, Cortés, Peruga

8 June 2016 3rd leg	Laboral Kutxa Baskonia	89–83(OT)	FC Barcelona Lassa	Vitoria-Gasteiz
21:00 (CEST)	Scoring by quarter: 15–21, 17–16, 13–17, 31–22, Overtime: 13–7
	Pts: Bourousis 32; Rebs: Bourousis 10; Asts: Adams 5 PIR: Bourousis 39	Boxscore	Pts: Satoranský 19; Rebs: Doellman 10; Asts: Satoranský 5 PIR: Tomić 21	Arena: Fernando Buesa Arena; Attendance: 10,225; Referees: Pérez Pérez, Conde, Calatrava

10 June 2016 4th leg	Laboral Kutxa Baskonia	63–85	FC Barcelona Lassa	Vitoria-Gasteiz
20:30 (CEST)	Scoring by quarter: 14–24, 17–23, 17–19, 15–19
	Pts: Tillie 13; Rebs: Bourousis 11; Asts: James 6 PIR: Tillie 19	Boxscore	Pts: Tomić 15; Rebs: Tomić 11; Asts: Navarro, Tomić 5 PIR: Tomić 28	Arena: Fernando Buesa Arena; Attendance: 11,628; Referees: Jiménez Trujillo, Cortés, Peruga

=== Euroleague ===
==== Regular season ====
Pos	Team	Pld	W	L	PF	PA	PD	Qualification
1	(Greece) Olympiacos	10	8	2	761	692	+69	Advance to Top 16
2	(Turkey) Anadolu Efes	10	6	4	863	805	+58	Advance to Top 16
3	(Spain) Laboral Kutxa	10	6	4	854	766	+88	Advance to Top 16
4	(Croatia) Cedevita	10	4	6	750	780	−30	Advance to Top 16
5	(France) Limoges	10	3	7	698	823	−125	Transfer to Eurocup
6	(Italy) EA7 Emporio Armani Milan	10	3	7	737	797	−60	Transfer to Eurocup

Source: Euroleague

Win Loss

16 October 2015 1	EA7 Milano (Italy)	78–76	(Spain) Laboral Kutxa	Milan, Italy
20:45 (CEST)	Scoring by quarter: 17–23, 21–13, 23–10, 17–30
	Pts: McLean 13; Rebs: Hummel 8 Asts: Gentile 6 PIR: McLean 19	Boxscore	Pts: James, Bourousis 13; Rebs: Bourousis 8 Asts: James 5 PIR: Bourousis 15	Arena: Mediolanum Forum; Attendance: 7,208; Referees: Ilija Belošević (SRB), Elias Koromilas (GRE), Joseph Bissang (FRA)

23 October 2015 2	Laboral Kutxa (Spain)	96–89(OT)	(Greece) Olympiacos	Vitoria-Gasteiz, Spain
20:30 (CEST)	Scoring by quarter: 21–18, 27–21, 21–24, 11–17, Overtime: 16–9
	Pts: Bourousis 28; Rebs: Bourousis 12; Asts: Adams 7 PIR: Bourousis 44	Boxscore	Pts: Lojeski 28; Rebs: Printezis 8 Asts: Spanoulis 9 PIR: Lojeski 32	Arena: Fernando Buesa Arena; Attendance: 10,826; Referees: Boris Rhyzhyk (UKR), Tolga Sahin (ITA), Milija Vojinović (SRB)

29 October 2015 3	Limoges (France)	71–107	(Spain) Laboral Kutxa	Limoges, France
20:30 (CET)	Scoring by quarter: 16–26, 22–34, 21–18, 16–29
	Pts: Culpepper 13; Rebs: Traoré 6 Asts: Culpepper, Westermann 5 PIR: Traoré, Westermann 13	Boxscore	Pts: Adams 18; Rebs: Tillie 5 Asts: Adams 9 PIR: Adams 29	Arena: Beaublanc; Attendance: 4,886; Referees: Damir Javor (SLO), Panagiotis Anastopoulos (GRE), Srđan Dožai (CRO)

5 November 2015 4	Laboral Kutxa (Spain)	92–90(OT)	(Turkey) Anadolu Efes	Vitoria-Gasteiz, Spain
20:45 (CET)	Scoring by quarter: 16–18, 12–15, 24–24, 29–24, Overtime: 11–9
	Pts: Bourousis 18; Rebs: Bourousis 11; Asts: Hanga 3 PIR: Bourousis 29	Boxscore	Pts: Heurtel 26; Rebs: Dunston 8 Asts: Heurtel 6 PIR: Heurtel 27	Arena: Fernando Buesa Arena; Attendance: 8,366; Referees: Fernando Rocha (POR), Oļegs Latiševs (LAT), Saverio Lanzarini (ITA)

13 November 2015 5	Cedevita (Croatia)	76–67	(Spain) Laboral Kutxa	Zagreb, Croatia
20:00 (CET)	Scoring by quarter: 16–18, 15–19, 23–13, 22–17
	Pts: Pullen 26; Rebs: Babić, Bilan 10; Asts: Gordić 7 PIR: Pullen 23	Boxscore	Pts: Blažič 20; Rebs: Bourousis, Hanga 8 Asts: Adams 6 PIR: Bourousis 26	Arena: Dražen Petrović Zagreb; Attendance: 4,719; Referees: Eddie Viator (FRA), Jakub Zamojski (POL), Aare Halliko (EST)

19 November 2015 6	Laboral Kutxa (Spain)	94–82	(Italy) EA7 Milano	Vitoria-Gasteiz, Spain
20:30 (CET)	Scoring by quarter: 28–19, 24–18, 20–17, 22–28
	Pts: Causeur 22; Rebs: Bourousis 13; Asts: Adams 4 PIR: Causeur 28	Boxscore	Pts: Gentile 24; Rebs: Barać 12; Asts: Cinciarini 7 PIR: Barać 21	Arena: Fernando Buesa Arena; Attendance: 9,734; Referees: Robert Lottermoser (GER), Elias Koromilas (GRE), Joseph Bissang (FRA)

26 November 2015 7	Olympiacos (Greece)	59–52	(Spain) Laboral Kutxa	Piraeus, Greece
20:45 (CET)	Scoring by quarter: 12–6, 24–16, 10–17, 13–13
	Pts: Spanoulis 10; Rebs: Hunter 10; Asts: Mantzaris 4 PIR: Athinaou, Hunter 12	Boxscore	Pts: Bourousis 16; Rebs: Bourousis 15; Asts: Adams, James 2 PIR: Bourousis 26	Arena: Peace and Friendship Stadium; Attendance: 8,000; Referees: Luigi Lamonica (ITA), Boris Shulga (UKR), Miloš Koljenšić (MNE)

3 December 2015 8	Laboral Kutxa (Spain)	92–56	(France) Limoges	Vitoria-Gasteiz, Spain
20:30 (CET)	Scoring by quarter: 29–15, 25–14, 19–14, 19–13
	Pts: Adams 23; Rebs: Bourousis 10; Asts: Bourousis 6 PIR: Adams 23	Boxscore	Pts: Westermann 14; Rebs: three players 4 Asts: Boungou Colo 4 PIR: Gatens 11	Arena: Fernando Buesa Arena; Attendance: 9,137; Referees: Christos Christodoulou (GRE), Borys Ryzhyk (UKR), Tolga Sahin (ITA)

10 December 2015 9	Anadolu Efes (Turkey)	95–86	(Spain) Laboral Kutxa	Istanbul, Turkey
20:00 (CET)	Scoring by quarter: 16-21, 25-25, 26-20, 28-20
	Pts: Heurtel 25; Rebs: Brown 8 Asts: Heurtel 9 PIR: Heurtel 32	Boxscore	Pts: Adams 20; Rebs: Tillie 7 Asts: Adams 4 PIR: Bourousis 17	Arena: Abdi İpekçi Arena; Attendance: 4,921; Referees: Fernando Rocha (POR), Damir Javor (SLO), Piotr Pastusiak (POL)

17 December 2015 10	Laboral Kutxa (Spain)	92–70	(Croatia) Cedevita	Vitoria-Gasteiz, Spain
20:30 (CET)	Scoring by quarter: 23−16, 22−13, 22−28, 25−13
	Pts: Causeur 20; Rebs: Bourousis 10; Asts: James 6 PIR: Causeur 31	Boxscore	Pts: Arapović 12; Rebs: White 7 Asts: Gordić, Pullen 3 PIR: Babić 16	Arena: Fernando Buesa Arena; Attendance: 8,945; Referees: Elias Koromilas (GRE), Joseph Bissang (FRA), Seffi Shemmesh (ISR)

==== Top 16 ====
Pos	Team	Pld	W	L	PF	PA	PD	Qualification
1	(Russia) CSKA Moscow	14	10	4	1299	1185	+114	Advance to Playoffs
2	(Spain) Laboral Kutxa	14	9	5	1110	1075	+35	Advance to Playoffs
3	(Spain) FC Barcelona Lassa	14	8	6	1085	1059	+26	Advance to Playoffs
4	(Spain) Real Madrid	14	7	7	1173	1165	+8	Advance to Playoffs
5	(Russia) Khimki	14	7	7	1164	1138	+26	
6	(Germany) Brose Baskets	14	7	7	1073	1088	−15	
7	(Greece) Olympiacos	14	6	8	1083	1105	−22	
8	(Lithuania) Žalgiris	14	2	12	1007	1179	−172	

Source: Euroleague

Win Loss

30 December 2015 1	Žalgiris (Lithuania)	68–89	(Spain) Laboral Kutxa	Kaunas, Lithuania
18:45 (CET)	Scoring by quarter: 14–33, 26–22, 15–9, 13–25
	Pts: Hanlan 16; Rebs: Ulanovas 10; Asts: Hanlan 3 PIR: Vougioukas 17	Boxscore	Pts: Adams 16; Rebs: Hanga 10; Asts: Adams, Causeur 4 PIR: Hanga 25	Arena: Žalgirio Arena; Attendance: 12,793; Referees: Saša Pukl (SLO), Petri Mäntylä (FIN), Marko Juras (SRB)

7 January 2016 2	Laboral Kutxa (Spain)	76–82	(Greece) Olympiacos	Vitoria-Gasteiz, Spain
20:30 (CET)	Scoring by quarter: 18–24, 16–19, 22–19, 20–20
	Pts: James 16; Rebs: Hanga 8 Asts: Adams, Causeur 3 PIR: Bourousis 22	Boxscore	Pts: Spanoulis 19; Rebs: Agravanis, Athinaiou 4 Asts: Hackett, Mantzaris 3 PIR: Hunter 18	Arena: Fernando Buesa Arena; Attendance: 10,237; Referees: Ilija Belošević (SRB), Matej Boltauzer (SLO), Oļegs Latiševs (LAT)

15 January 2016 3	Khimki (Russia)	76–68	(Spain) Laboral Kutxa	Moscow, Russia
18:00 (CET)	Scoring by quarter: 17–12, 22–27, 20–9, 17–20
	Pts: Shved 24; Rebs: Augustine 8 Asts: Rice 13; PIR: Augustine 29	Boxscore	Pts: four players 9 Rebs: Causeur 8 Asts: Adams 5 PIR: Hanga 15	Arena: Krylatskoye Sports Palace; Attendance: 1,800; Referees: Luigi Lamonica (ITA), Fernando Rocha (POR), Sašo Petek (SLO)

21 January 2016 4	Laboral Kutxa (Spain)	81–71	(Russia) CSKA Moscow	Vitoria-Gasteiz, Spain
20:30 (CET)	Scoring by quarter: 18–10, 16–24, 23–20, 24–17
	Pts: Bourousis 19; Rebs: Bourousis 13; Asts: Adams 6 PIR: Bourousis 30	Boxscore	Pts: Teodosić 18; Rebs: Hines 11; Asts: Teodosić 7 PIR: Teodosić 21	Arena: Fernando Buesa Arena; Attendance: 11,528; Referees: Borys Rhyzhyk (UKR), Milivoje Jovčić (SRB), Eddie Viator (FRA)

29 January 2016 5	FC Barcelona Lassa (Spain)	78–81(OT)	(Spain) Laboral Kutxa	Barcelona, Spain
21:00 (CET)	Scoring by quarter: 15–13, 14–18, 15–20, 26–19, Overtime: 8–11
	Pts: Abrines 21; Rebs: Lawal 10; Asts: Satoranský 5 PIR: Abrines 28	Boxscore	Pts: Bourousis 24; Rebs: Bourousis, Causeur 8 Asts: Bourousis, Shengelia 3 PIR: Bourousis 28	Arena: Palau Blaugrana; Attendance: 5,623; Referees: Christos Christodoulou (GRE), Carmelo Paternico (ITA), Joseph Bissang (FRA)

5 February 2016 6	Real Madrid (Spain)	68–77	(Spain) Laboral Kutxa	Madrid, Spain
20:45 (CET)	Scoring by quarter: 19–19, 18–22, 12–18, 19–18
	Pts: Rodríguez 18; Rebs: Hernangómez 8 Asts: Llull, Rodríguez 4 PIR: Rodríguez 18	Boxscore	Pts: Causeur 15; Rebs: Bourousis 14; Asts: Adams 4 PIR: Causeur 17	Arena: Barclaycard Center; Attendance: 11,088; Referees: Saša Pukl (SLO), Spiros Gkontas (GRE), Matej Boltauzer (SLO)

11 February 2016 7	Laboral Kutxa (Spain)	90–64	(Germany) Brose Baskets	Vitoria-Gasteiz, Spain
20:45 (CET)	Scoring by quarter: 26–13, 23–17, 23–16, 18–18
	Pts: Bourousis 18; Rebs: Bourousis 11; Asts: Adams 5 PIR: Bourousis 28	Boxscore	Pts: Wanamaker 11; Rebs: Harris 6 Asts: Strēlnieks 5 PIR: Wanamaker 13	Arena: Fernando Buesa Arena; Attendance: 10,239; Referees: Elias Koromilas (GRE), Tolga Sahin (TUR), Boris Shulga (UKR)

25 February 2016 8	Laboral Kutxa (Spain)	71–65	(Lithuania) Žalgiris	Vitoria-Gasteiz, Spain
20:30 (CET)	Scoring by quarter: 22–20, 10–12, 13–21, 26–12
	Pts: Adams 17; Rebs: Bourousis 11; Asts: Adams 3 PIR: Bourousis 22	Boxscore	Pts: Jankūnas, Vougioukas 13; Rebs: Vougioukas 13; Asts: Ulanovas 5 PIR: Jankūnas 13	Arena: Fernando Buesa Arena; Attendance: 10,649; Referees: Milivoje Jovčić (SRB), Oļegs Latiševs (LAT), Saverio Lanzarini (ITA)

4 March 2016 9	Olympiacos (Greece)	82–68	(Spain) Laboral Kutxa	Piraeus, Greece
20:45 (CET)	Scoring by quarter: 19–16, 25–14, 19–17, 19–21
	Pts: Printezis 17; Rebs: Hunter, Printezis 5 Asts: Spanoulis 8 PIR: Printezis 19	Boxscore	Pts: Bourousis 19; Rebs: Bourousis 7 Asts: Hanga, James 4 PIR: Bourousis 23	Arena: Peace and Friendship Stadium; Attendance: 10,040; Referees: Ilija Belošević (SRB), Robert Lottermoser (GER), Eddie Viator (FRA)

10 March 2016 10	Laboral Kutxa (Spain)	98–83	(Russia) Khimki	Vitoria-Gasteiz, Spain
20:45 (CET)	Scoring by quarter: 21–24, 24–22, 27–15, 26–22
	Pts: Adams, Causeur 17; Rebs: Bourousis 13; Asts: Bourousis 6 PIR: Bourousis 29	Boxscore	Pts: Shved 19; Rebs: Boone 6 Asts: Rice 10; PIR: Shved 21	Arena: Fernando Buesa Arena; Attendance: 12,189; Referees: Saša Pukl (SLO), Fernando Rocha (POR), Marcin Kowalski (POL)

17 March 2016 11	CSKA Moscow (Russia)	90–78	(Spain) Laboral Kutxa	Moscow, Russia
18:00 (CET)	Scoring by quarter: 20–14, 20–12, 28–30, 22–22
	Pts: de Colo 22; Rebs: Freeland 10; Asts: Teodosić 6 PIR: de Colo 27	Boxscore	Pts: Hanga 19; Rebs: Bourousis 9 Asts: Adams, James 4 PIR: Hanga 30	Arena: Megasport Arena; Attendance: 9,021; Referees: Christos Christodoulou (GRE), Luigi Lamonica (ITA), Jurgis Laurinavičius (LTU)

23 March 2016 12	Laboral Kutxa (Spain)	75–71	(Spain) FC Barcelona Lassa	Vitoria-Gasteiz, Spain
20:30 (CET)	Scoring by quarter: 15–16, 25–17, 16–12, 19–26
	Pts: Bourousis 22; Rebs: Bourousis, Hanga 7 Asts: James 5 PIR: Bourousis 23	Boxscore	Pts: Satoranský 20; Rebs: Dorsey 6 Asts: Satoranský 6 PIR: Satoranský 26	Arena: Fernando Buesa Arena; Attendance: 12,789; Referees: Milivoje Jovčić (SRB), Oļegs Latiševs (LAT), Ioannis Foufis (GRE)

1 April 2016 13	Laboral Kutxa (Spain)	89–88	(Spain) Real Madrid	Vitoria-Gasteiz, Spain
20:30 (CEST)	Scoring by quarter: 11–21, 25–25, 31–21, 22–21
	Pts: James 27; Rebs: Bourousis 10; Asts: Adams 5 PIR: Bourousis 35	Boxscore	Pts: Rodríguez 18; Rebs: Ayón 8 Asts: Llull, Rodríguez 5 PIR: Rodríguez 22	Arena: Fernando Buesa Arena; Attendance: 13,726; Referees: Ilija Belošević (SRB), Elias Koromilas (GRE), Petri Mäntylä (FIN)

7 April 2016 14	Brose Baskets (Germany)	89–69	(Spain) Laboral Kutxa	Bamberg, Germany
20:00 (CEST)	Scoring by quarter: 29–14, 16–14, 18–24, 26–17
	Pts: Theis 21; Rebs: Miller 6 Asts: Zisis 9 PIR: Miller 22	Boxscore	Pts: Blažič 19; Rebs: Blažič 6 Asts: Adams 7 PIR: Blažič 20	Arena: Brose Arena; Attendance: 5,700; Referees: Fernando Rocha (POR), Damir Javor (SLO), Aare Halliko (EST)

==== Playoffs ====
Win Loss

13 April 2016 1	Laboral Kutxa (Spain)	84–68	(Greece) Panathinaikos	Vitoria-Gasteiz, Spain
20:45 (CEST)	Scoring by quarter: 18–16, 21–12, 25–21, 20–19
	Pts: Adams 20; Rebs: Tillie 11; Asts: James 6 PIR: Bourousis 21	Boxscore	Pts: Raduljica 21; Rebs: Raduljica 6 Asts: Calathes 11; PIR: Raduljica 28	Arena: Fernando Buesa Arena; Attendance: 10,936; Referees: Sreten Radović (CRO), Borys Ryzhyk (UKR), Piotr Pastusiak (POL)

15 April 2016 2	Laboral Kutxa (Spain)	82–78(OT)	(Greece) Panathinaikos	Vitoria-Gasteiz, Spain
20:45 (CEST)	Scoring by quarter: 16–21, 22–15, 16–15, 19–22, Overtime: 9–5
	Pts: Adams 24; Rebs: Bourousis 9 Asts: Bertāns, James 3 PIR: Adams, Bertāns 20	Boxscore	Pts: Diamantidis 17; Rebs: Gist 10; Asts: Diamantidis 6 PIR: Diamantidis 26	Arena: Fernando Buesa Arena; Attendance: 13,964; Referees: Saša Pukl (SLO), Milivoje Jovčić (SRB), Tolga Sahin (ITA)

19 April 2016 3	Panathinaikos (Greece)	75–84	(Spain) Laboral Kutxa	Athens, Greece
20:15 (CEST)	Scoring by quarter: 17–20, 20–22, 18–14, 20–28
	Pts: Raduljica 13; Rebs: Raduljica 8 Asts: Diamantidis 7 PIR: Diamantidis 18	Boxscore	Pts: Adams 24; Rebs: James 6 Asts: Bourousis 6 PIR: Adams 27	Arena: Olympic Sports Center Athens; Attendance: 16,419; Referees: Luigi Lamonica (ITA), Ilija Belošević (SRB), Oļegs Latiševs (LAT)

==== Final Four ====
Win Loss

13 May 2016 Semifinals	Fenerbahçe (Turkey)	88–77(OT)	(Spain) Laboral Kutxa	Berlin, Germany
21:00 (CEST)	Scoring by quarter: 23–15, 18–25, 14–17, 17–15, Overtime: 16–5
	Pts: Bogdanović 18; Rebs: Antić, Datome 7 Asts: Sloukas 7 PIR: Sloukas 20	Boxscore	Pts: Bourousis 22; Rebs: Bourousis 10; Asts: Adams 7 PIR: Bourousis 24	Arena: Mercedes-Benz Arena; Attendance: 11,216; Referees: Christos Christodoulou (GRE), Borys Rhyzhyk (UKR), Oļegs Latiševs (LAT)

15 May 2016 Third place	Laboral Kutxa (Spain)	75–85	(Russia) Lokomotiv Kuban	Berlin, Germany
17:00 (CEST)	Scoring by quarter: 16–20, 26–20, 11–21, 22–24
	Pts: Adams 25; Rebs: Hanga 7 Asts: Adams 6 PIR: Adams 31	Boxscore	Pts: Broekhoff, Delaney 21; Rebs: Claver, Singleton 7 Asts: Delaney, Draper 4 PIR: Broekhoff 29	Arena: Mercedes-Benz Arena; Attendance: 10,658; Referees: Christos Christodoulou (GRE), Borys Rhyzhyk (UKR), Piotr Pastusiak (POL)

=== Copa del Rey ===
Win Loss

19 February 2016 Quarterfinals	Rio Natura Monbus Obradoiro	77–79	Laboral Kutxa Baskonia	A Coruña
21:30 (CET)	Scoring by quarter: 12–24, 18–11, 30–23, 17–21
	Pts: Brown 14; Rebs: Brown 6 Asts: McGrath 6 PIR: three players 13	Boxscore	Pts: Hanga 20; Rebs: Bourousis, Hanga 8 Asts: Bourousis 3 PIR: Hanga 31	Arena: Coliseum; Attendance: 10,000; Referees: Martín Bertrán, Conde, Peruga

20 February 2016 Semifinals	Laboral Kutxa Baskonia	80–86	Real Madrid	A Coruña
21:30 (CET)	'Scoring by quarter: 17–25, 27–15, 17–20, 19–26
	Pts: Bourousis 16; Rebs: Bourousis 13; Asts: Adams, Hanga 3 PIR: Bourousis 20	Boxscore	Pts: Llull 15; Rebs: Reyes 9 Asts: Rodríguez 6 PIR: Ayón 18	Arena: Coliseum; Attendance: 10,000; Referees: Pérez Pizarro, Pérez Pérez, Peruga

== Statistics ==
Legend
GP	Games played	GS	Games started	MPG	Minutes per game
FG%	Field-goal percentage	3FG%	3-point field-goal percentage	FT%	Free-throw percentage
RPG	Rebounds per game	APG	Assists per game	SPG	Steals per game
BPG	Blocks per game	PPG	Points per game	PIR	PIR per game

=== Liga ACB ===
Player	GP	GS	MPG	FG%	3FG%	FT%	RPG	APG	SPG	BPG	PPG	EFF
Darius Adams	34	34	25.0	.452	.389	.872	2.8	2.7	1.3	0.1	17.2	13.7
Dāvis Bertāns	15	12	25.0	.429	.452	.857	3.4	1.2	0.5	0.7	9.4	7.7
Jaka Blažič	32	1	18.0	.475	.361	.854	2.6	0.8	0.6	0.1	6.8	5.4
Ioannis Bourousis	32	2	23.0	.515	.370	.880	7.1	2.2	0.9	0.5	12.9	18.9
Fabien Causeur	24	24	26.0	.416	.349	.712	2.6	2.6	1.5	0.1	9.0	10.1
Alberto Corbacho	32	0	11.0	.423	.417	.833	0.8	0.4	0.2	0.0	4.0	2.7
Ilimane Diop	32	16	13.0	.584	.000	.813	3.6	0.4	0.5	0.9	4.0	6.0
Mamadou Diop	8	0	4.0	.300	.286	1.000	1.3	0.0	0.0	0.0	1.4	0.8
Ádám Hanga	33	33	25.0	.533	.304	.721	4.0	1.6	1.6	0.7	9.1	12.0
Mike James	34	0	20.0	.429	.315	.814	1.9	2.6	0.8	0.1	10.1	10.2
Kristjan Kangur	3	0	16.0	.500	.200	.000	3.3	0.7	0.3	0.0	3.7	4.7
Darko Planinić	26	16	9.0	.679	.000	.714	2.0	0.3	0.2	0.0	4.1	4.0
Tornike Shengelia	12	9	22.0	.557	.304	.732	5.0	1.0	0.8	0.8	12.1	14.1
Kim Tillie	34	23	24.0	.477	.286	.811	4.8	1.1	0.8	0.2	7.1	8.4

Last updated: May 22, 2016.
Source: ACB

=== ACB Playoffs ===
Player	GP	GS	MPG	FG%	3FG%	FT%	RPG	APG	SPG	BPG	PPG	EFF
Darius Adams	7	7	28.0	.365	.360	1.000	2.6	3.4	1.4	0.3	12.4	10.0
Dāvis Bertāns	7	6	25.0	.342	.321	.917	2.4	0.7	0.6	0.4	6.6	4.1
Ioannis Bourousis	7	0	26.0	.500	.520	.773	8.9	2.4	0.6	1.0	14.6	19.6
Alberto Corbacho	1	0	4.0	.000	.000	.000	1.0	0.0	0.0	0.0	0.0	1.0
Ilimane Diop	4	1	5.0	.000	.000	.000	0.0	0.0	0.3	0.3	0.0	0.0
Mamadou Diop	0	0	0.0	.000	.000	.000	0.0	0.0	0.0	0.0	0.0	0.0
Ádám Hanga	7	7	32.0	.413	.200	.741	6.0	1.1	1.0	1.1	10.9	14.4
Mike James	7	0	23.0	.475	.200	.824	2.4	3.4	0.1	0.1	10.4	10.6
Darko Planinić	7	6	12.0	.556	.000	.600	2.3	0.0	0.0	0.1	4.6	5.4
Michael Roll	7	1	21.0	.364	.286	1.000	2.0	0.9	0.7	0.0	4.3	2.4
Tornike Shengelia	7	1	9.0	.286	.286	.857	1.3	0.7	0.3	0.0	2.9	2.0
Kim Tillie	7	6	24.0	.500	.286	.846	4.6	0.7	0.1	0.1	8.1	8.3

Last updated: June 10, 2016.
Source: ACB

=== Copa del Rey ===
Player	GP	GS	MPG	FG%	3FG%	FT%	RPG	APG	SPG	BPG	PPG	EFF
Darius Adams	2	2	24.0	.346	.333	.833	3.5	2.0	2.0	0.0	14.5	12.0
Dāvis Bertāns	2	0	14.0	.000	.000	.500	0.5	0.0	0.0	0.0	0.5	0.0
Jaka Blažič	2	0	18.0	.286	.000	.833	1.5	0.0	0.5	0.0	4.5	4.5
Ioannis Bourousis	2	0	25.0	.476	.333	.875	10.5	2.5	0.5	0.0	14.5	22.0
Fabien Causeur	2	2	29.0	.550	.250	.900	2.5	2.0	2.0	0.0	16.5	15.5
Alberto Corbacho	0	0	0.0	.000	.000	.000	0.0	0.0	0.0	0.0	0.0	0.0
Ilimane Diop	2	2	14.0	.666	.000	.750	2.0	0.0	0.5	1.0	3.5	4.0
Mamadou Diop	0	0	0.0	.000	.000	.000	0.0	0.0	0.0	0.0	0.0	0.0
Ádám Hanga	2	2	34.0	.706	.636	.500	5.5	2.5	3.0	1.0	16.0	24.5
Mike James	2	0	17.0	.200	.000	.000	3.0	1.5	1.5	0.0	3.0	1.5
Kim Tillie	2	2	27.0	.500	.000	1.000	2.5	0.5	0.5	0.5	6.5	5.0

Last updated: February 20, 2016.
Source: ACB

=== Euroleague ===
Player	GP	GS	MPG	FG%	3FG%	FT%	RPG	APG	SPG	BPG	PPG	EFF
Darius Adams	29	29	25.11	.395	.338	.827	2.2	4.0	1.3	0.1	13.2	12.0
Dāvis Bertāns	15	8	20.39	.514	.474	.905	1.9	0.9	0.4	0.4	7.9	6.9
Jaka Blažič	29	3	19.08	.433	.352	.793	3.2	0.6	0.6	0.0	7.8	6.4
Ioannis Bourousis	29	0	25.04	.502	.383	.811	8.7	2.2	0.8	0.8	14.5	21.1
Fabien Causeur	21	20	28.13	.444	.395	.810	3.1	2.0	1.1	0.3	10.3	11.0
Alberto Corbacho	21	1	10.35	.400	.315	1.000	1.1	0.4	0.1	0.0	3.4	2.2
Ilimane Diop	27	13	9.09	.489	.000	.857	2.1	0.1	0.2	0.6	2.6	2.4
Mamadou Diop	4	0	2.27	.333	.333	.500	0.5	0.0	0.0	0.0	1.0	0.0
Ádám Hanga	27	27	29.01	.452	.279	.707	5.1	1.7	1.4	1.2	8.2	13.1
Mike James	29	0	21.13	.424	.368	.864	2.6	2.7	0.6	0.1	10.0	10.1
Kristjan Kangur	6	0	12.54	.444	.333	.500	1.8	0.8	0.0	0.0	2.0	1.8
Darko Planinić	25	16	0.0	.547	.000	.741	2.1	0.2	0.2	0.0	3.1	2.5
Tornike Shengelia	9	7	19.24	.545	.500	.682	3.8	1.2	0.8	0.6	9.1	10.4
Kim Tillie	29	24	22.26	.456	.267	.717	3.8	0.9	1.0	0.2	6.0	6.3

Last updated: May 15, 2016.
Source: Euroleague
