= 2017 ACB Playoffs =

Tournament details
- Country: Spain
- Dates: 20 May – 16 June 2017
- Teams: 8
- Defending champions: Real Madrid

Final positions
- Champions: Valencia Basket (1st title)
- Runner-up: Real Madrid
- Semifinalists: Baskonia; Unicaja

Tournament statistics
- Matches played: 23
- Attendance: 194,201 (8,444 per match)

The 2017 ACB Playoffs, also known as 2017 Liga Endesa Playoffs for sponsorship reasons, was the postseason tournament of the ACB's 2016–17 season, which began September 30, 2016. The playoffs started on 20 May 2017, and ended on 16 June 2017 with the Finals.

Real Madrid was the defending champion, but lost the title to Valencia Basket in the finals, who won its first league ever.

== Format ==
At the end of the regular season, the eight teams with the most wins qualify for the playoffs. The seedings are based on each team's record.

The bracket is fixed; there is no reseeding. The quarterfinals are best-of-three series; the team that has two wins advances to the next round. This round is in a 1–1–1 format. From the semifinals onward, the rounds are best-of-five series; the team that has three wins advances to the next round. These rounds, including the Finals, are in a 2–2–1 format. Home court advantage in any round belong to the higher-seeded team.

== Playoff qualifying ==
On 9 April 2017, Real Madrid became the first team to clinch a playoff spot.

Seed	Team	Record	Clinched		
Seed	Team	Record	Playoff berth	Seeded team	Top seed
1	Real Madrid	25–7	9 April	4 May	11 May
2	Baskonia	23–9	14 April	14 May	–
3	Valencia Basket	23–9	16 April	4 May	–
4	Unicaja	22–10	19 April	14 May	–
5	Iberostar Tenerife	22–10	16 April	–	–
6	FC Barcelona Lassa	22–10	23 April	–	–
7	Herbalife Gran Canaria	21–11	23 April	–	–
8	MoraBanc Andorra	16–16	10 May	–	–

== Bracket ==
Teams in bold advanced to the next round. The numbers to the left of each team indicate the team's seeding, and the numbers to the right indicate the result of games including result in bold of the team that won in that game.

Quarterfinals
**1** Real Madrid	**107**	77	**95**
**8** MoraBanc Andorra	76	**89**	84
**4** Unicaja	**79**	67	**71**
**5** Iberostar Tenerife	65	**73**	61
**2** Baskonia	**71**	79	**73**
**7** Herbalife Gran Canaria	59	**94**	71
**3** Valencia Basket	**83**	79	**67**
**6** FC Barcelona Lassa	61	**91**	64

Semifinals
**1** Real Madrid	**71**	**101**	**76**
**4** Unicaja	68	72	73
**2** Baskonia	82	**90**	69	77
**3** Valencia Basket	**83**	70	**75**	**85**

Finals
**1** Real Madrid	**87**	79	64	76
**3** Valencia Basket	81	**86**	**81**	**87**

== Quarterfinals ==
All times were in Central European Summer Time (UTC+02:00)

=== Real Madrid v MoraBanc Andorra ===
24 May 2017	**Real Madrid**	**107**–76 (Series: **1–0**)	MoraBanc Andorra	Madrid
20:30	Scoring by quarter: **25**–19, **27**–19, **29**–18, **26**–20
	Pts: Carroll 16; Rebs: Randolph 7 Asts: Llull 15; PIR: Reyes 20	Boxscore	Pts: Shermadini 21; Rebs: Stević 7 Asts: Albicy 5 PIR: Shermadini 25	Arena: WiZink Center; Attendance: 8,076; Referees: Miguel Ángel Pérez Pérez, Óscar Perea, Rubén Sánchez Mohedas

26 May 2017	**MoraBanc Andorra**	**89**–77 (Series: **1–1**)	Real Madrid	Andorra la Vella
20:00	Scoring by quarter: 16–16, 19–**23**, **34**–20, **20**–18
	Pts: Shermadini 19; Rebs: Shermadini 11; Asts: Albicy 8 PIR: Shermadini 25	Boxscore	Pts: Carroll, Nocioni 15; Rebs: Ayón 12; Asts: Llull 4 PIR: Ayón, Nocioni 16	Arena: Poliesportiu d'Andorra; Attendance: 4,470; Referees: Benjamín Jiménez, José Ramón García Ortiz, Jacobo Rial

28 May 2017	**Real Madrid**	**95**–84 (Series: **2–1**)	MoraBanc Andorra	Madrid
19:15	Scoring by quarter: **27**–18, 19–**21**, 23–**27**, **26**–18
	Pts: Llull 19; Rebs: Ayón 9 Asts: Fernández 5 PIR: Ayón 25	Boxscore	Pts: Shermadini 21; Rebs: Antetokounmpo, Shermadini 6 Asts: Albicy 7 PIR: Shermadini 22	Arena: WiZink Center; Attendance: 8,109; Referees: Emilio Pérez Pizarro, Carlos Cortés, Fernando Calatrava

Regular season series
Madrid won 2–0 in the regular season series

8 January 2017

Boxscore

**Real Madrid**	**96**–92 (OT)	MoraBanc Andorra

WiZink Center, Madrid

14 May 2017

Boxscore

MoraBanc Andorra	86–**88** (OT)	**Real Madrid**

Poliesportiu d'Andorra, Andorra la Vella

This was the first meeting in the playoffs between Real Madrid and MoraBanc Andorra.

=== Baskonia v Herbalife Gran Canaria ===
20 May 2017	**Baskonia**	**71**–59 (Series: **1–0**)	Herbalife Gran Canaria	Vitoria-Gasteiz
20:30	Scoring by quarter: **17**–7, 17–**21**, **12**–10, **25**–21
	Pts: Hanga 17; Rebs: Hanga 8 Asts: Laprovíttola 7 PIR: Hanga 26	Boxscore	Pts: Aguilar 12; Rebs: O'Neale 11; Asts: McCalebb 5 PIR: Aguilar 19	Arena: Fernando Buesa Arena; Attendance: 12,183; Referees: Antonio Conde, Carlos Cortés, Martín Caballero

25 May 2017	**Herbalife Gran Canaria**	**94**–79 (Series: **1–1**)	Baskonia	Las Palmas
22:00	Scoring by quarter: **27**–17, **22**–15, 22–**21**, 23–**26**
	Pts: O'Neale 20; Rebs: Aguilar, Planinić 7 Asts: Oliver 4 PIR: Báez 31	Boxscore	Pts: Larkin 17; Rebs: Diop 5 Asts: Larkin 4 PIR: Diop 18	Arena: Gran Canaria Arena; Attendance: 6,132; Referees: José Antonio Martín Bertrán, Fernando Calatrava, Jordi Aliaga

28 May 2017	**Baskonia**	**73**–71 (Series: **2–1**)	Herbalife Gran Canaria	Vitoria-Gasteiz
17:00	Scoring by quarter: 20–**23**, **19**–16, 17–**18**, **17**–14
	Pts: Tillie 14; Rebs: Hanga 8 Asts: Beaubois, Laprovíttola 4 PIR: Voigtmann 18	Boxscore	Pts: Báez 18; Rebs: Báez, O'Neale 5 Asts: Báez 5 PIR: Báez 29	Arena: Fernando Buesa Arena; Attendance: 10,638; Referees: Benjamín Jiménez, Carlos Peruga, Vicente Bultó

Regular season series
Tied 1–1 in the regular season series

27 December 2016

Boxscore

**Herbalife Gran Canaria**	**74**–61	Baskonia

Gran Canaria Arena, Las Palmas

14 April 2017

Boxscore

**Baskonia**	**95**–90	Herbalife Gran Canaria

Fernando Buesa Arena, Vitoria-Gasteiz

This was the fifth playoff meeting between these two teams, with Baskonia winning three of the four meetings.

Previous playoff series
Baskonia leads 3–1 in all-time playoff series

2005

**TAU Cerámica**	**3**–1	Gran Canaria

2005 Quarterfinals

2011

**Caja Laboral**	**2**–0	Gran Canaria 2014

2011 Quarterfinals

2013

Laboral Kutxa	1–**2**	**Herbalife Gran Canaria**

2013 Quarterfinals

2016

**Laboral Kutxa Baskonia**	**2**–1	Herbalife Gran Canaria

2016 Quarterfinals

=== Valencia Basket v FC Barcelona Lassa ===
20 May 2017	**Valencia Basket**	**83**–61 (Series: **1–0**)	FC Barcelona Lassa	Valencia
18:00	Scoring by quarter: 15–15, **26**–11, **22**–15, 20–20
	Pts: Dubljević 16; Rebs: Sikma 9 Asts: San Emeterio 7 PIR: Sikma 17	Boxscore	Pts: Rice 14; Rebs: Tomić 6 Asts: Renfroe, Rice 3 PIR: Rice 11	Arena: Fuente de San Luis; Attendance: 8,200; Referees: Juan Carlos García González, Sergio Manuel, Rafael Serrano

25 May 2017	**FC Barcelona Lassa**	**91**–79 (Series: **1–1**)	Valencia Basket	Barcelona
20:00	Scoring by quarter: **26**–22, **26**–13, 21–**27**, **18**–17
	Pts: Renfroe 16; Rebs: Claver, Tomić 7 Asts: Perperoglou, Tomić 4 PIR: Renfroe 21	Boxscore	Pts: Sastre 17; Rebs: four players 3 Asts: Martínez 7 PIR: Martínez 23	Arena: Palau Blaugrana; Attendance: 4,036; Referees: Daniel Hierrezuelo, Francisco José Araña, Jorge Martínez Fernández

27 May 2017	**Valencia Basket**	**67**–64 (Series: **2–1**)	FC Barcelona Lassa	Valencia
18:00	Scoring by quarter: **19**–14, 12–12, 18–**21**, **18**–17
	Pts: San Emeterio 13; Rebs: Dubljević 15; Asts: Diot 6 PIR: San Emeterio 21	Boxscore	Pts: Rice 18; Rebs: Oleson, Perperoglou 7 Asts: Koponen, Tomić 3 PIR: Tomić 20	Arena: Fuente de San Luis; Attendance: 8,400; Referees: Juan Carlos García González, Antonio Conde, Luis Miguel Castillo

Regular season series
Tied 1–1 in the regular season series

27 December 2016

Boxscore

**FC Barcelona Lassa**	**94**–82	Valencia Basket

Palau Blaugrana, Barcelona

16 April 2017

Boxscore

**Valencia Basket**	**76**–59	FC Barcelona Lassa

Fuente de San Luis, Valencia

This was the fifth playoff meeting between these two teams, with FC Barcelona Lassa winning the previous four meetings.

Previous playoff series
Barcelona leads 4–0 in all-time playoff series

2003

**FC Barcelona**	**3**–0	Pamesa Valencia

2003 Finals

2009

**Regal FC Barcelona**	**2**–0	Pamesa Valencia

2009 Quarterfinals

2012

**FC Barcelona Regal**	**3**–1	Valencia Basket

2012 Semifinals

2014

Valencia Basket	2–**3**	**FC Barcelona**

2014 Semifinals

=== Unicaja v Iberostar Tenerife ===
21 May 2017	**Unicaja**	**79**–65 (Series: **1–0**)	Iberostar Tenerife	Málaga
12:30	Scoring by quarter: **19**–17, **25**–17, 13–**20**, **22**–11
	Pts: Eyenga 21; Rebs: Omić 8 Asts: Díaz 6 PIR: Eyenga 22	Boxscore	Pts: Kirksay 16; Rebs: Kirksay 6 Asts: San Miguel 5 PIR: Doornekamp 16	Arena: Martín Carpena; Attendance: 7,883; Referees: Emilio Pérez Pizarro, Luis Miguel Castillo, Andrés Fernández

26 May 2017	**Iberostar Tenerife**	**73**–67 (Series: **1–1**)	Unicaja	San Cristóbal de La Laguna
22:00	Scoring by quarter: **20**–12, **19**–15, **20**–18, 14–**22**
	Pts: Richotti 14; Rebs: Doornekamp 8 Asts: Richotti 5 PIR: Richotti 20	Boxscore	Pts: Smith 13; Rebs: Díez 7 Asts: Díaz 3 PIR: Díez 14	Arena: Santiago Martín; Attendance: 5,144; Referees: Carlos Peruga, Vicente Bultó, Juan de Dios Oyón

28 May 2017	**Unicaja**	**71**–61 (Series: **2–1**)	Iberostar Tenerife	Málaga
21:30	Scoring by quarter: **16**–10, **19**–16, **16**–15, 20–20
	Pts: Nedović 15; Rebs: Omić 9 Asts: Smith 4 PIR: Suárez 20	Boxscore	Pts: Bogris 12; Rebs: Doornekamp 9 Asts: Richotti, White 5 PIR: Doornekamp 16	Arena: Martín Carpena; Attendance: 7,387; Referees: José Antonio Martín Bertrán, Miguel Ángel Pérez Pérez, Sergio Manuel

Regular season series
Unicaja won 2–0 in the regular season series

23 October 2016

Boxscore

Iberostar Tenerife	72–**73**	**Unicaja**

Santiago Martín, San Cristóbal de La Laguna

19 April 2017

Boxscore

**Unicaja**	**88**–67	Iberostar Tenerife

Martín Carpena, Málaga

This was the first meeting in the playoffs between Unicaja and Iberostar Tenerife.

== Semifinals ==
All times were in Central European Summer Time (UTC+02:00)

=== Real Madrid v Unicaja ===
31 May 2017	**Real Madrid**	**71**–68 (Series: **1–0**)	Unicaja	Madrid
20:30	Scoring by quarter: **20**–16, 18–18, 14–**16**, **19**–18
	Pts: Llull 28; Rebs: Ayón, Mačiulis 6 Asts: Llull 6 PIR: Llull 27	Boxscore	Pts: Nedović 18; Rebs: Díez 7 Asts: Smith 6 PIR: Nedović 18	Arena: WiZink Center; Attendance: 9,039; Referees: Juan Carlos García González, Vicente Bultó, Óscar Perea

2 June 2017	**Real Madrid**	**101**–72 (Series: **2–0**)	Unicaja	Madrid
20:30	Scoring by quarter: **27**–23, **30**–10, **22**–16, 22–**23**
	Pts: Carroll 29; Rebs: Dončić 5 Asts: Dončić 6 PIR: Carroll 25	Boxscore	Pts: Fogg 12; Rebs: Díez 6 Asts: Smith 3 PIR: three players 7	Arena: WiZink Center; Attendance: 9,407; Referees: Emilio Pérez Pizarro, Benjamín Jiménez, Jordi Aliaga

4 June 2017	Unicaja	73–**76** (Series: **0–3**)	**Real Madrid**	Málaga
18:30	Scoring by quarter: **14**–11, 19–**20**, 19–**20**, 21–**25**
	Pts: Nedović 14; Rebs: Brooks 11; Asts: Díaz, Fogg 4 PIR: Díaz 16	Boxscore	Pts: Randolph 13; Rebs: Ayón, Dončić 7 Asts: Llull 9 PIR: Ayón 17	Arena: Martín Carpena; Attendance: 10,264; Referees: Miguel Ángel Pérez Pérez, Carlos Peruga, Fernando Calatrava

Regular season series
Tied 1–1 in the regular season series

30 September 2016

Boxscore

**Real Madrid**	**101**–90	Unicaja

WiZink Center, Madrid

12 February 2017

Boxscore

**Unicaja**	**82**–78	Real Madrid

Martín Carpena, Málaga

This was the fourth playoff meeting between these two teams, with Real Madrid winning two of the three meetings

Previous playoff series
Madrid leads 2–1 in all-time playoff series

1991

**Real Madrid Otaysa**	**2**–0	Caja Ronda

1991 First round

2008

Real Madrid	0–**2**	**Unicaja**

2008 Quarterfinals

2014

**Real Madrid**	**3**–1	Unicaja

2014 Semifinals

=== Baskonia v Valencia Basket ===
30 May 2017	Baskonia	82–**83** (Series: **0–1**)	**Valencia Basket**	Vitoria-Gasteiz
20:30	Scoring by quarter: **22**–21, **19**–12, 23–**25**, 18–**25**
	Pts: Larkin 17; Rebs: four players 4 Asts: Larkin 8 PIR: Larkin 25	Boxscore	Pts: San Emeterio 24; Rebs: San Emeterio 7 Asts: Diot 5 PIR: San Emeterio 31	Arena: Fernando Buesa Arena; Attendance: 9,312; Referees: Daniel Hierrezuelo, Antonio Conde, Luis Miguel Castillo

1 June 2017	**Baskonia**	**90**–70 (Series: **1–1**)	Valencia Basket	Vitoria-Gasteiz
20:30	Scoring by quarter: **21**–16, 25–25, **20**–16, **24**–13
	Pts: Ledo 24; Rebs: Diop 8 Asts: Larkin 6 PIR: Hanga 29	Boxscore	Pts: Sato 18; Rebs: Sato 7 Asts: Diot 6 PIR: Sato 28	Arena: Fernando Buesa Arena; Attendance: 9,671; Referees: Miguel Ángel Pérez Pérez, Carlos Peruga, Francisco José Araña

3 June 2017	**Valencia Basket**	**75**–69 (Series: **2–1**)	Baskonia	Valencia
19:00	Scoring by quarter: **23**–14, 11–**23**, **27**–16, 14–**16**
	Pts: Diot 16; Rebs: Dubljević 6 Asts: Diot 5 PIR: Diot 18	Boxscore	Pts: Larkin 16; Rebs: Diop 6 Asts: Larkin 5 PIR: Shengelia 13	Arena: Fuente de San Luis; Attendance: 8,500; Referees: José Antonio Martín Bertrán, Carlos Cortés, Sergio Manuel

5 June 2017	**Valencia Basket**	**85**–77 (Series: **3–1**)	Baskonia	Valencia
20:30	Scoring by quarter: **23**–17, **20**–15, 19–**20**, 23–**25**
	Pts: San Emeterio 19; Rebs: Dubljević 7 Asts: Diot 10; PIR: San Emeterio 29	Boxscore	Pts: Larkin 19; Rebs: Shengelia 8 Asts: Ledo 5 PIR: Ledo 21	Arena: Fuente de San Luis; Attendance: 8,500; Referees: Juan Carlos García González, Benjamin Jiménez, Fernando Calatrava

Regular season series
Tied 1–1 in the regular season series

13 November 2016

Boxscore

**Valencia Basket**	**99**–91	Baskonia

Fuente de San Luis, Valencia

5 March 2017

Boxscore

**Baskonia**	**71**–63	Valencia Basket

Fernando Buesa Arena, Vitoria-Gasteiz

This was the fourth playoff meeting between these two teams, with Baskonia winning the previous three meetings.

Previous playoff series
Baskonia leads 3–0 in all-time playoff series

1991

**Taugrés**	**2**–0	Pamesa Valencia

1991 First round

2002

**TAU Cerámica**	**3**–1	Pamesa Valencia

2002 Quarterfinals

2008

**TAU Cerámica**	**2**–1	Pamesa Valencia

2008 Quarterfinals

== Finals ==
All times were in Central European Summer Time (UTC+02:00)

9 June 2017	**Real Madrid**	**87**–81 (Series: **1–0**)	Valencia Basket	Madrid
20:30	Scoring by quarter: 21–21, 22–22, **22**–16, 22–22
	Pts: Llull 20; Rebs: Ayón. Reyes 6 Asts: Llull 4 PIR: Llull 22	Boxscore	Pts: Dubljević 19; Rebs: Dubljević 5 Asts: Diot 9 PIR: Dubljević, Sikma 20	Arena: WiZink Center; Attendance: 10,717; Referees: José Antonio Martín Bertrán, Antonio Conde, Carlos Peruga

11 June 2017	Real Madrid	79–**86** (Series: **1–1**)	**Valencia Basket**	Madrid
18:30	Scoring by quarter: 22–**28**, **19**–15, **23**–18, 15–**25**
	Pts: Llull 22; Rebs: Randolph 6 Asts: Llull 6 PIR: Llull, Reyes 17	Boxscore	Pts: Dubljević 20; Rebs: Dubljević 9 Asts: three players 4 PIR: Dubljević 22	Arena: WiZink Center; Attendance: 11,133; Referees: Juan Carlos García González, Miguel Ángel Pérez Pérez, Sergio Manuel

14 June 2017	**Valencia Basket**	**81**–64 (Series: **2–1**)	Real Madrid	Valencia
20:30	Scoring by quarter: 11–**16**, **25**–19, **23**–16, **22**–13
	Pts: Thomas 16; Rebs: Dubljević, Sikma 6 Asts: Sikma 5 PIR: Dubljević 21	Boxscore	Pts: Llull 16; Rebs: Ayón, Dončić 8 Asts: Fernández 3 PIR: Ayón, Dončić 20	Arena: Fuente de San Luis; Attendance: 8,500; Referees: Daniel Hierrezuelo, Emilio Pérez Pizarro, Benjamín Jiménez

16 June 2017	**Valencia Basket**	**87**–76 (Series: **3–1**)	Real Madrid	Valencia
20:30	Scoring by quarter: 19–**20**, **29**–11, 19–**25**, 20–20
	Pts: Sastre 19; Rebs: Dubljević 9 Asts: Sikma 4 PIR: Sastre 19	Boxscore	Pts: Llull 23; Rebs: Ayón 7 Asts: Llull 7 PIR: Llull 31	Arena: Fuente de San Luis; Attendance: 8,500; Referees: Juan Carlos García González, Antonio Conde, Carlos Peruga

Regular season series
Madrid won 2–0 in the regular season series

6 October 2016

Boxscore

Valencia Basket	75–**94**	**Real Madrid**

Fuente de San Luis, Valencia

22 January 2017

Boxscore

**Real Madrid**	**85**–71	Valencia Basket

WiZink Center, Madrid

This was the fifth playoff meeting between these two teams, with Real Madrid winning the previous four meetings.

Previous playoff series
Madrid leads 4–0 in all-time playoff series

1998

**Real Madrid Teka**	**3**–1	Pamesa Valencia

1998 Quarterfinals

2007

**Real Madrid**	**3**–1	Pamesa Valencia

2007 Quarterfinals

2015

**Real Madrid**	**3**–1	Valencia Basket

2015 Semifinals

2016

**Real Madrid**	**3**–1	Valencia Basket

2016 Semifinals
