= 2016 Euroleague Final Four =

Basketball tournament

- Season: 2015–16 Euroleague

Tournament details
- Arena: Mercedes-Benz Arena; Berlin, Germany
- Dates: 13–15 May 2016

Final positions
- Champions: (Russia) CSKA Moscow (7th title)
- Runners-up: (Turkey) Fenerbahçe
- Third place: (Russia) Lokomotiv Kuban
- Fourth place: (Spain) Laboral Kutxa

Awards and statistics
- MVP: (France) Nando de Colo
- Top scorer(s): (France) Nando de Colo (52)

The 2016 Euroleague Final Four was the concluding EuroLeague Final Four tournament of the 2015–16 Euroleague season, which was the 59th season of Europe's premier club basketball tournament, and the 16th season since it has been organised by Euroleague Basketball. The Final Four was played at the Mercedes-Benz Arena, in Berlin, Germany, in May 2016. CSKA Moscow won its 7th EuroLeague title, after beating Fenerbahçe in the championship game, by a score of 101–96, in overtime.

== Venue ==
On May 11, 2015, Euroleague Basketball announced that the 2016 Final Four would be played at the Mercedes-Benz Arena, in Berlin, Germany. With a seating capacity of 14,500 people for basketball games, it is home to the Alba Berlin basketball team, and is used for ice hockey, basketball, and handball games, as well as concerts. The area surrounding the arena is filled with various entertainment venues, including a cinema, a casino, a hotel, and various bars and restaurants. The arena previously hosted the 2009 Euroleague Final Four. The arena was one of the most prominent elements of the Mediaspree urban redevelopment project, and it quickly gained emblematic status in the debates surrounding the project's impact.

The LED construction grid on the facade of the arena was equipped with more than 300,000 LED clusters on a 12 m (39 ft) high, and approximately 120 m (390 ft) wide section of the semicircular 105° glass facade, with a total area of more than 1,440 m^{2} (15,500 sq ft). Light pixels, consisting of two groups of 19 LEDs (colour palette: 16.7 million RGB colours), were attached to the vertical bracing of the facade. The vertical distances were 0.20 m (7.9 in), and the horizontal distances between the axes were 0.90 m (2 ft 11 in).

Berlin	2016 Euroleague Final Four (Europe)
Mercedes-Benz Arena	2016 Euroleague Final Four (Europe)
Capacity: 14,500	2016 Euroleague Final Four (Europe)

== Road to the Final Four ==
Team	Regular season			Top 16			Playoffs	
Team	Group	W	L	Group	W	L	Opponent	Score
Fenerbahçe	A (1st)	8	2	E (1st)	11	3	(Spain) Real Madrid	3–0
Laboral Kutxa	B (3rd)	6	4	F (2nd)	9	5	(Greece) Panathinaikos	3–0
CSKA Moscow	D (1st)	9	1	F (1st)	10	4	(Serbia) Crvena zvezda	3–0
Lokomotiv Kuban	C (1st)	8	2	E (2nd)	9	5	(Spain) FC Barcelona Lassa	3–2

== Bracket ==
Semifinals
13 May
(Turkey) Fenerbahçe	88
(Spain) Laboral Kutxa	77
13 May
(Russia) CSKA Moscow	88
(Russia) Lokomotiv Kuban	81

Championship game
15 May
(Turkey) Fenerbahçe	96
(Russia) CSKA Moscow	101
Third place game
15 May
(Spain) Laboral Kutxa	75
(Russia) Lokomotiv Kuban	85

== Semifinals ==
=== Semifinal A ===
13 May 2016	CSKA Moscow (Russia)	88–81	(Russia) Lokomotiv Kuban	Berlin, Germany
18:00 (CEST)	Scoring by quarter: 23–12, 24–25, 21–22, 20–22
	Pts: De Colo 30; Rebs: Hines, Kurbanov 7 Asts: Teodosić 6 PIR: De Colo 30	Boxscore	Pts: Delaney 26; Rebs: Randolph 11; Asts: Delaney, Draper 4 PIR: Delaney 24	Arena: Mercedes-Benz Arena; Attendance: 11,261; Referees: Luigi Lamonica (ITA), Robert Lottermoser (GER), Damir Javor (SLO)

Starters:			Pts	Reb	Ast
PG	1	(France) Nando de Colo	30	3	4
SG	22	(United States) Cory Higgins	7	2	1
SF	41	(Russia) Nikita Kurbanov	4	7	0
PF	20	(Russia) Andrey Vorontsevich	9	4	0
C	42	(United States) Kyle Hines	8	7	3
Reserves:					
PG	4	(Serbia) Miloš Teodosić	8	1	6
SG	7	(Russia) Vitaly Fridzon	13	1	0
PF	8	(United States) Demetris Nichols	DNP		
PG	9	(United States) Aaron Jackson	0	0	0
C	12	(Russia) Pavel Korobkov	DNP		
SG	30	(Russia) Mikhail Kulagin	DNP		
PF	31	(Russia) Victor Khryapa	9	0	3
Head coach:
(Hellenic Basketball Federation) Dimitrios Itoudis

CSKA Moscow	Lokomotiv Kuban

Starters:			Pts	Reb	Ast
PG	0	(United States) Malcolm Delaney	26	3	4
SG	18	(Russia) Evgeny Voronov	0	0	0
SF	45	(Australia) Ryan Broekhoff	10	5	1
PF	9	(Spain) Víctor Claver	2	5	2
C	3	(United States) Anthony Randolph	13	11	1
Reserves:					
PF	1	(United States) Chris Singleton	6	5	1
PG	4	(Croatia) Dontaye Draper	17	1	4
PG	10	(Russia) Sergey Bykov	0	0	0
SG	12	(United States) Matt Janning	7	0	1
PG	15	(Russia) Maxim Kolyushkin	DNP		
PF	17	(Russia) Nikita Balashkov	DNP		
PF	20	(Russia) Andrey Zubkov	0	0	0
Head coach:
(Hellenic Basketball Federation) Georgios Bartzokas

=== Semifinal B ===
13 May 2016	Fenerbahçe (Turkey)	88–77(OT)	(Spain) Laboral Kutxa	Berlin, Germany
21:00 (CEST)	Scoring by quarter: 23–15, 18–25, 14–17, 17–15, Overtime: 16–5
	Pts: Bogdanović 18; Rebs: Antić, Datome 7 Asts: Sloukas 7 PIR: Sloukas 20	Boxscore	Pts: Bourousis 22; Rebs: Bourousis 10; Asts: Adams 7 PIR: Bourousis 24	Arena: Mercedes-Benz Arena; Attendance: 11,216; Referees: Christos Christodoulou (GRE), Borys Ryzhyk (UKR), Oļegs Latiševs (LAT)

Starters:			Pts	Reb	Ast
PG	35	(Turkey) Bobby Dixon	3	5	0
SG	13	(Serbia) Bogdan Bogdanović	18	6	3
SF	70	(Italy) Luigi Datome	15	7	2
PF	12	(North Macedonia) Pero Antić	8	7	2
C	8	(United States) Ekpe Udoh	14	2	1
Reserves:					
PG	3	(Georgia (country)) Ricky Hickman	3	1	0
PF	5	(Turkey) Barış Hersek	DNP		
SG	10	(Turkey) Melih Mahmutoğlu	DNP		
PG	16	(Greece) Kostas Sloukas	13	5	7
PG	23	(Turkey) Berk Uğurlu	DNP		
PF	24	(Czech Republic) Jan Veselý	14	3	1
SF	33	(Serbia) Nikola Kalinić	0	2	1
Head coach:
(Basketball Federation of Serbia) Željko Obradović

Fenerbahçe	Laboral Kutxa

Starters:			Pts	Reb	Ast
PG	20	(Bulgaria) Darius Adams	19	2	7
SG	8	(Hungary) Ádám Hanga	10	5	0
SF	42	(Latvia) Dāvis Bertāns	2	2	1
PF	14	(France) Kim Tillie	13	3	0
C	6	(Croatia) Darko Planinić	0	2	0
Reserves:					
PG	3	(United States) Mike James	6	2	5
PF	4	(Spain) Mamadou Diop	DNP		
SG	5	(France) Fabien Causeur	0	0	0
C	9	(Greece) Ioannis Bourousis	22	10	2
SF	11	(Slovenia) Jaka Blažič	5	2	1
C	12	(Spain) Ilimane Diop	0	0	0
SF	33	(Spain) Alberto Corbacho	DNP		
Head coach:
(Croatian Basketball Federation) Velimir Perasović

== Third place game ==
15 May 2016	Laboral Kutxa (Spain)	75–85	(Russia) Lokomotiv Kuban	Berlin, Germany
17:00 (CEST)	Scoring by quarter: 16–20, 26–20, 11–21, 22–24
	Pts: Adams 25; Rebs: Hanga 7 Asts: Adams 6 PIR: Adams 31	Boxscore	Pts: Broekhoff, Delaney 21; Rebs: Claver, Singleton 7 Asts: Delaney, Draper 4 PIR: Broekhoff 29	Arena: Mercedes-Benz Arena; Attendance: 10,658; Referees: Christos Christodoulou (GRE), Borys Ryzhyk (UKR), Piotr Pastusiak (POL)

Starters:			Pts	Reb	Ast
PG	20	(Bulgaria) Darius Adams	25	6	6
SG	8	(Hungary) Ádám Hanga	3	7	1
SF	42	(Latvia) Dāvis Bertāns	13	0	1
PF	14	(France) Kim Tillie	7	6	2
C	6	(Croatia) Darko Planinić	5	2	1
Reserves:					
PG	3	(United States) Mike James	2	0	1
PF	4	(Spain) Mamadou Diop	DNP		
SG	5	(France) Fabien Causeur	DNP		
C	9	(Greece) Ioannis Bourousis	5	2	1
SF	11	(Slovenia) Jaka Blažič	8	3	0
C	12	(Spain) Ilimane Diop	4	3	0
SF	33	(Spain) Alberto Corbacho	3	0	1
Head coach:
(Croatian Basketball Federation) Velimir Perasović

Laboral Kutxa	Lokomotiv Kuban

Starters:			Pts	Reb	Ast
PG	0	(United States) Malcolm Delaney	21	5	4
SG	10	(Russia) Sergey Bykov	0	0	2
SF	45	(Australia) Ryan Broekhoff	21	6	3
PF	9	(Spain) Víctor Claver	10	7	3
PF	1	(United States) Chris Singleton	10	7	2
Reserves:					
C	3	(United States) Anthony Randolph	DNP		
PG	4	(Croatia) Dontaye Draper	2	0	4
SG	12	(United States) Matt Janning	10	1	0
PG	15	(Russia) Maxim Kolyushkin	DNP		
PF	17	(Russia) Nikita Balashkov	0	0	0
SG	18	(Russia) Evgeny Voronov	0	1	0
PF	20	(Russia) Andrey Zubkov	11	2	2
Head coach:
(Hellenic Basketball Federation) Georgios Bartzokas

== Championship game ==
The Final was the second Final Four meeting between the two teams. In the 2015 Euroleague Final Four, CSKA Moscow beat Fenerbahçe 86–80, in the third-place game. It was the first European final for Fenerbahçe, while CSKA played in its 13th championship game.

In the Final, it seemed early on that CSKA was destined to win its seventh EuroLeague title. After a strong first half, the Russian side led 30–50 at halftime, and had a lead of as many as 21 points in the third quarter. However, in the fourth quarter, Fenerbahçe surged back, and CSKA player, Victor Khryapa, had to score a tip-in with 1.9 seconds remaining on the game clock, to tie the game. It was the third Final in EuroLeague history that went to overtime. In overtime, CSKA, led by Nando De Colo, took the lead, and finally claimed its seventh EuroLeague title, and its first one in eight years.

15 May 2016	Fenerbahçe (Turkey)	96–101(OT)	(Russia) CSKA Moscow	Berlin, Germany
20:00 (CEST)	Scoring by quarter: 20–22, 10–28, 23–19, 30–14, Overtime: 13–18
	Pts: Dixon 17; Rebs: Udoh 11; Asts: Dixon 4 PIR: Udoh 24	Boxscore	Pts: De Colo 22; Rebs: Khryapa, Teodosić 5 Asts: De Colo, Teodosić 7 PIR: Teodosić 29	Arena: Mercedes-Benz Arena; Attendance: 12,250; Referees: Luigi Lamonica (ITA), Robert Lottermoser (GER), Damir Javor (SLO)

Starters:			Pts	Reb	Ast
PG	16	(Greece) Kostas Sloukas	10	2	0
SG	13	(Serbia) Bogdan Bogdanović	6	3	3
SF	33	(Serbia) Nikola Kalinić	3	3	2
PF	70	(Italy) Luigi Datome	16	5	3
PF	24	(Czech Republic) Jan Veselý	7	5	1
Reserves:					
PG	3	(Georgia (country)) Ricky Hickman	5	0	0
PF	5	(Turkey) Barış Hersek	DNP		
C	8	(United States) Ekpe Udoh	16	11	3
SG	10	(Turkey) Melih Mahmutoğlu	0	0	0
PF	12	(North Macedonia) Pero Antić	16	1	0
PG	23	(Turkey) Berk Uğurlu	DNP		
PG	35	(Turkey) Bobby Dixon	17	4	1
Head coach:
(Basketball Federation of Serbia) Željko Obradović

Fenerbahçe	CSKA Moscow

Fenerbahçe	Statistics	CSKA
18/40 (45%)	2-pt field goals	22/36 (61.1%)
11/30 (36.7%)	3-pt field goals	9/25 (36%)
27/39 (69.2%)	Free throws	30/32 (93.8%)
16	Offensive rebounds	6
22	Defensive rebounds	26
38	Total rebounds	32
16	Assists	22
13	Turnovers	13
6	Steals	8
4	Blocks	5
28	Fouls	33

Starters:			Pts	Reb	Ast
PG	1	(France) Nando de Colo	22	2	7
SG	22	(United States) Cory Higgins	12	1	3
SF	41	(Russia) Nikita Kurbanov	4	3	0
PF	20	(Russia) Andrey Vorontsevich	11	3	0
C	42	(United States) Kyle Hines	15	4	2
Reserves:					
SG	3	(Russia) Dmitry Kulagin	0	0	0
PG	4	(Serbia) Miloš Teodosić	19	5	7
SG	7	(Russia) Vitaly Fridzon	0	0	0
PF	8	(United States) Demetris Nichols	0	1	0
PG	9	(United States) Aaron Jackson	8	1	1
C	12	(Russia) Pavel Korobkov	0	2	1
PF	31	(Russia) Victor Khryapa	10	5	1
Head coach:
(Hellenic Basketball Federation) Dimitrios Itoudis

- Team captains (C): (Turkey) Melih Mahmutoğlu (Fenerbahçe) and (Russia) Victor Khryapa (CSKA Moscow)

== Final Four MVP ==
Player	Club
(France) Nando de Colo	(Russia) CSKA Moscow

== See also ==
- 2016 Eurocup Finals
- 2016 FIBA Europe Cup Final Four
