= 2016 ACB Playoffs =

The 2016 ACB Playoffs was the postseason tournament of the ACB's 2015–16 season, which began October 10, 2015. The playoffs started on May 28, 2016, and ended with the Finals.

== Bracket ==
Quarterfinals
FC Barcelona Lassa	99	84
Montakit Fuenlabrada	65	68
Laboral Kutxa Baskonia	81	87	78
Herbalife Gran Canaria	76	93	71
Real Madrid	107	87	93
UCAM Murcia	103	91	72
Valencia Basket	79	88
Unicaja	75	59

Semifinals
FC Barcelona Lassa	84	73	83	85
Laboral Kutxa Baskonia	57	68	89	63
Real Madrid	82	97	86	82
Valencia Basket	57	88	87	80

Finals
FC Barcelona Lassa	100	70	74	84
Real Madrid	99	90	91	91

== Quarterfinals ==
=== FC Barcelona Lassa v Montakit Fuenlabrada ===
26 May 2016	FC Barcelona Lassa	99–65	Montakit Fuenlabrada	Barcelona
21:00 (CEST)	Scoring by quarter: 31–15, 23–17, 20–17, 25–16
	Pts: Tomić 15; Rebs: Tomić 9 Asts: Satoranský 9 PIR: Tomić 30	Boxscore	Pts: Llorca 12; Rebs: Sobin 7 Asts: Úriz 5 PIR: Llorca 12	Arena: Palau Blaugrana; Attendance: 4,052; Referees: Cortés, Castillo, Rial

29 May 2016	Montakit Fuenlabrada	68–84	FC Barcelona Lassa	Fuenlabrada
20:30 (CEST)	Scoring by quarter: 16–18, 20–20, 9–29, 23–17
	Pts: Urtasun 14; Rebs: González 8 Asts: Tabu, Úriz 3 PIR: Urtasun 13	Boxscore	Pts: Satoranský 21; Rebs: Doellman 8 Asts: Satoranský 7 PIR: Satoranský 27	Arena: Fernando Martín; Attendance: 5,395; Referees: Conde, García Ortiz, Sánchez Mohedas

=== Real Madrid v UCAM Murcia ===
27 May 2016	Real Madrid	107–103	UCAM Murcia	Madrid
21:15 (CEST)	Scoring by quarter: 21–28, 28–21, 30–21, 28–33
	Pts: Llull 26; Rebs: Ayón, Thompkins 5 Asts: Rodríguez 10; PIR: Llull 29	Boxscore	Pts: Antelo 27; Rebs: four players 3 Asts: Campazzo 9 PIR: Campazzo 33	Arena: Barclaycard Center; Attendance: 8,294; Referees: Pérez Pizarro, Araña, Aliaga

29 May 2016	UCAM Murcia	91–87	Real Madrid	Murcia
20:30 (CEST)	Scoring by quarter: 26–31, 21–19, 24–18, 20–19
	Pts: Campazzo, Faverani 19; Rebs: Faverani 6 Asts: Campazzo 4 PIR: Campazzo 19	Boxscore	Pts: Reyes 21; Rebs: Reyes 8 Asts: Llull, Rodríguez 5 PIR: Reyes 27	Arena: Palacio de Deportes; Attendance: 6,342; Referees: Hierrezuelo, Martínez, Manuel

31 May 2016	Real Madrid	93–72	UCAM Murcia	Madrid
21:00 (CEST)	Scoring by quarter: 28–10, 26–23, 14–12, 25–27
	Pts: Ayón, Carroll 18; Rebs: Ayón 8 Asts: Rodríguez 7 PIR: Ayón 33	Boxscore	Pts: Campazzo 22; Rebs: Antelo, Campazzo 6 Asts: Campazzo 7 PIR: Campazzo 24	Arena: Barclaycard Center; Attendance: 8,684; Referees: Martín Bertrán, García González, Peruga

=== Valencia Basket v Unicaja ===
27 May 2016	Valencia Basket	79–75	Unicaja	Valencia
21:30 (CEST)	Scoring by quarter: 21–25, 14–12, 21–12, 23–26
	Pts: Shurna 16; Rebs: Dubljević, Hamilton 6 Asts: Diot 6 PIR: Shurna 20	Boxscore	Pts: Nedović 22; Rebs: Thomas 8 Asts: Nedović 3 PIR: Nedović 23	Arena: Fuente de San Luis; Attendance: 8,500; Referees: Jiménez Trujillo, Calatrava, Serrano

29 May 2016	Unicaja	59–88	Valencia Basket	Málaga
17:30 (CEST)	Scoring by quarter: 12–20, 17–14, 21–33, 9–21
	Pts: Nedović 17; Rebs: Thomas 7 Asts: Marković, Suárez 3 PIR: Nedović 15	Boxscore	Pts: Hamilton 22; Rebs: Dubljević 7 Asts: Diot 6 PIR: Hamilton 26	Arena: Martín Carpena; Attendance: 8,491; Referees: García González, Perea, Munar

=== Laboral Kutxa Baskonia v Herbalife Gran Canaria ===
27 May 2016	Laboral Kutxa Baskonia	81–76	Herbalife Gran Canaria	Vitoria-Gasteiz
19:30 (CEST)	Scoring by quarter: 13–17, 18–15, 27–16, 23–28
	Pts: Adams 24; Rebs: Bourousis 12; Asts: Adams, James 4 PIR: Adams 23	Boxscore	Pts: Seeley 18; Rebs: Omić 7 Asts: three players 4 PIR: Seeley 22	Arena: Fernando Buesa Arena; Attendance: 9,634; Referees: Martín Bertrán, Peruga, Fernández

29 May 2016	Herbalife Gran Canaria	93–87	Laboral Kutxa Baskonia	Las Palmas
12:30 (WEST)	Scoring by quarter: 23–20, 26–17, 22–25, 22–25
	Pts: Oliver 13; Rebs: Aguilar 7 Asts: Pangos 6 PIR: Oliver 15	Boxscore	Pts: Adams 22; Rebs: Bourousis 9 Asts: Adams 7 PIR: Bourousis 28	Arena: Gran Canaria Arena; Attendance: 6,732; Referees: Pérez Pérez, Bultó, Oyón

31 May 2016	Laboral Kutxa Baskonia	78–71	Herbalife Gran Canaria	Vitoria-Gasteiz
20:30 (CEST)	Scoring by quarter: 18–20, 22–21, 21–13, 17–17
	Pts: Bourousis 17; Rebs: Bourousis 11; Asts: Adams, Bourousis 4 PIR: Bourousis 28	Boxscore	Pts: Báez, Pangos 13; Rebs: Omić 6 Asts: Pangos 5 PIR: Pangos 17	Arena: Fernando Buesa Arena; Attendance: 12,683; Referees: Conde, Jiménez, Cortés

== Semifinals ==
=== FC Barcelona Lassa v Laboral Kutxa Baskonia ===
3 June 2016	FC Barcelona Lassa	84–57	Laboral Kutxa Baskonia	Barcelona
21:00 (CEST)	Scoring by quarter: 16–9, 27–19, 24–15, 17–14
	Pts: Tomić 14; Rebs: Samuels 8 Asts: Tomić 4 PIR: Satoranský, Tomić 22	Boxscore	Pts: Hanga 15; Rebs: Hanga 8 Asts: James 4 PIR: Hanga 24	Arena: Palau Blaugrana; Attendance: 5,547; Referees: Hierrezuelo, Jiménez, Araña

5 June 2016	FC Barcelona Lassa	73–68	Laboral Kutxa Baskonia	Barcelona
12:30 (CEST)	Scoring by quarter: 25–17, 15–18, 12–21, 21–12
	Pts: Perperoglou 11; Rebs: Perperoglou, Tomić 5 Asts: Tomić 4 PIR: Perperoglou 15	Boxscore	Pts: James 15; Rebs: Tillie 7 Asts: James 4 PIR: James 19	Arena: Palau Blaugrana; Attendance: 5,027; Referees: Pérez Pizarro, Cortés, Peruga

8 June 2016	Laboral Kutxa Baskonia	89–83(OT)	FC Barcelona Lassa	Vitoria-Gasteiz
21:00 (CEST)	Scoring by quarter: 15–21, 17–16, 13–17, 31–22, Overtime: 13–7
	Pts: Bourousis 32; Rebs: Bourousis 10; Asts: Adams 5 PIR: Bourousis 39	Boxscore	Pts: Satoranský 19; Rebs: Doellman 10; Asts: Satoranský 5 PIR: Tomić 21	Arena: Fernando Buesa Arena; Attendance: 10,225; Referees: Pérez Pérez, Conde, Calatrava

10 June 2016	Laboral Kutxa Baskonia	63–85	FC Barcelona Lassa	Vitoria-Gasteiz
20:30 (CEST)	Scoring by quarter: 14–24, 17–23, 17–19, 15–19
	Pts: Tillie 13; Rebs: Bourousis 11; Asts: James 6 PIR: Tillie 19	Boxscore	Pts: Tomić 15; Rebs: Tomić 11; Asts: Navarro, Tomić 5 PIR: Tomić 28	Arena: Fernando Buesa Arena; Attendance: 11,628; Referees: Jiménez Trujillo, Cortés, Peruga

=== Real Madrid v Valencia Basket ===
2 June 2016	Real Madrid	82–57	Valencia Basket	Madrid
21:00 (CEST)	Scoring by quarter: 14–19, 17–7, 16–16, 35–15
	Pts: Carroll 15; Rebs: Nocioni 6 Asts: Llull 4 PIR: Llull 19	Boxscore	Pts: Diot, Shurna 10; Rebs: Hamilton 6 Asts: Martínez 4 PIR: three players 10	Arena: Barclaycard Center; Attendance: 8,696; Referees: García González, Pérez Pérez, Manuel

4 June 2016	Real Madrid	97–88	Valencia Basket	Madrid
21:00 (CEST)	Scoring by quarter: 19–10, 22–29, 21–24, 35–25
	Pts: Llull 19; Rebs: Fernández 7 Asts: Rodríguez 7 PIR: Ayón 24	Boxscore	Pts: Dubljević 19; Rebs: Hamilton 10; Asts: Diot 6 PIR: Dubljević 26	Arena: Barclaycard Center; Attendance: 10,013; Referees: Martín Bertrán, Perea, Martínez

7 June 2016	Valencia Basket	87–86(OT)	Real Madrid	Valencia
21:00 (CEST)	Scoring by quarter: 25–19, 22–26, 17–11, 10–18, Overtime: 13–12
	Pts: Lučić 18; Rebs: Dubljević 7 Asts: Vives 7 PIR: Lučić 21	Boxscore	Pts: Fernández 22; Rebs: Ayón 9 Asts: Fernández 6 PIR: Fernández 27	Arena: Fuente de San Luis; Attendance: 8,500; Referees: Hierrezuelo, Pérez Pizarro, Bultó

9 June 2016	Valencia Basket	80–82	Real Madrid	Valencia
21:00 (CEST)	Scoring by quarter: 18–25, 20–19, 15–9, 27–29
	Pts: Hamilton 23; Rebs: Hamilton 10; Asts: Vives 5 PIR: Hamilton 31	Boxscore	Pts: Carroll 17; Rebs: Ayón 8 Asts: Llull 4 PIR: Llull 20	Arena: Fuente de San Luis; Attendance: 8,500; Referees: García González, Conde, Araña

== Finals ==
15 June 2016	FC Barcelona Lassa	100–99	Real Madrid	Barcelona
20:30 (CEST)	Scoring by quarter: 22–22, 25–26, 33–27, 20–24
	Pts: Doellman 19; Rebs: Tomić 8 Asts: Tomić 8 PIR: Tomić 24	Boxscore	Pts: Carroll 21; Rebs: Ayón 6 Asts: Llull 10; PIR: Carroll 26	Arena: Palau Blaugrana; Attendance: 6,471; Referees: García González, Pérez Pérez, Calatrava

17 June 2016	FC Barcelona Lassa	70–90	Real Madrid	Barcelona
19:00 (CEST)	Scoring by quarter: 12–28, 20–16, 26–22, 12–24
	Pts: Tomić 14; Rebs: Doellman, Tomić 5 Asts: Satoranský 5 PIR: Perperoglou, Samuels 14	Boxscore	Pts: Llull 20; Rebs: Ayón 6 Asts: Rodríguez 5 PIR: Ayón 28	Arena: Palau Blaugrana; Attendance: 6,742; Referees: Hierrezuelo, Jiménez, Peruga

20 June 2016	Real Madrid	91–74	FC Barcelona Lassa	Madrid
20:00 (CEST)	Scoring by quarter: 29–21, 25–20, 23–17, 14–16
	Pts: Llull 21; Rebs: Ayón 6 Asts: Llull 7 PIR: Llull 30	Boxscore	Pts: Tomić 18; Rebs: Doellman 8 Asts: Ribas 6 PIR: Doellman 21	Arena: Barclaycard Center; Attendance: 12,038; Referees: Pérez Pizarro, Conde, Cortés

22 June 2016	Real Madrid	91–84	FC Barcelona Lassa	Madrid
20:30 (CEST)	Scoring by quarter: 19–26, 26–21, 27–18, 19–19
	Pts: Llull 21; Rebs: Ayón 9 Asts: Reyes 6 PIR: Llull 23	Boxscore	Pts: Satoranský, Tomić 17; Rebs: Tomić 8 Asts: Navarro 7 PIR: Satoranský 25	Arena: Barclaycard Center; Attendance: 12,173; Referees: Hierrezuelo, García González, Jiménez
