= Darius Adams =

American basketball player (born 1989)

Personal information
- Born: April 17, 1989 (age 37) Decatur, Illinois, U.S.
- Listed height: 6 ft 1 in (1.85 m)
- Listed weight: 180 lb (82 kg)

Career information
- High school: MacArthur (Decatur, Illinois)
- College: Lincoln (Illinois) (2007–2009); Indianapolis (2009–2011)
- NBA draft: 2011: undrafted
- Playing career: 2012–2024
- Position: Point guard

Career history
- 2012: Guaiqueríes de Margarita
- 2012: Los Prados
- 2012: Reales de La Vega
- 2013: Kryvbas
- 2013: Entente Orléanaise 45
- 2013–2014: Eisbären Bremerhaven
- 2014: SLUC Nancy
- 2014–2016: Laboral Kutxa Baskonia
- 2016–2019: Xinjiang Flying Tigers
- 2019–2021: Qingdao Eagles
- 2022: Birmingham Squadron
- 2022: Fort Wayne Mad Ants
- 2022–2023: Fujian Sturgeons
- 2023–2024: Shenzhen Leopards

Career highlights
- CBA MVP (2019); CBA Finals MVP (2017); CBA Top Scorer (2018); ABC champion (2016); All-ABC Team (2016); CBA champion (2017); Liga ACB Top Scorer (2016); All-Liga ACB First Team (2016); Bundesliga Best Offensive Player (2014); Bundesliga Top Scorer (2014); LPB All-Star (2012); First-team All-GLVC (2011); Second-team All-GLVC (2010)

Darius Anthony Adams (born April 17, 1989) is an American-born naturalized Bulgarian former professional basketball player. Standing at 6 ft 1 in (1.85 m), he played at the point guard position.

== Professional career ==
Adams went undrafted in the 2011 NBA draft. In February 2012, he joined Guaiqueríes de Margarita of Venezuela for the 2012 LPB season. Following the LPB season, he joined Los Prados of the Dominican Republic for the 2012 District National season. On June 9, 2012, he recorded a triple-double with 19 points, 11 rebounds, and 10 assists. In August 2012, he signed with Reales de La Vega, for the rest of the 2012 LNB season.

On January 12, 2013, Adams signed with SC Kryvbas of Ukraine, for the rest of the 2012–13 season. In April 2013, he left Kryvbas and signed with Entente Orléanaise 45 of France, for the rest of the season.

On July 21, 2013, Adams signed with Eisbären Bremerhaven of Germany for the 2013–14 season. In 34 games, he averaged a league leading 18.0 points, as well as 4.1 rebounds, 4.0 assists, and 1.8 steals per game. In April 2014, he was named the 2014 BBL Best Offensive Player.

On July 1, 2014, Adams signed with SLUC Nancy of the French LNB Pro A. On December 24, 2014, he left Nancy and signed with Laboral Kutxa Baskonia of Spain, for the rest of the season.

On July 25, 2015, Adams re-signed with Laboral Kutxa Baskonia for one more season. He qualified to the 2016 Euroleague Final Four, and five days later, he scored 41 points in a Liga ACB game against Montakit Fuenlabrada, becoming the first player of the club in 25 years that made such a performance.

On July 29, 2016, Adams signed with Xinjiang Flying Tigers of the Chinese Basketball Association. During that season, Adams would not only prove to be a valuable player for the Flying Tigers, but also helped them to their best record of the CBA season and their fifth ever CBA Finals appearance. Adams was the team's MVP during that series, leading Xinjiang Flying Tigers to their first ever CBA Finals championship by sweeping the powerhouse Guangdong Southern Tigers 4–0.

Adams re-signed with Xinjiang Flying Tigers, appearing in all 41 games in the season while averaging 42.6 minutes per game. Adams averaged 38.7 points, 6.8 rebounds, 8.5 assists and 2.6 steals to lead the CBA in scoring per game in the regular season.

On January 4, 2022, Adams was acquired by the Birmingham Squadron of the NBA G League. He averaged 15.6 points, 4.4 rebounds, 4.1 assists, and 1.5 steals per game. On March 12, 2022, Adams was signed by the Fort Wayne Mad Ants.

== Career statistics ==
Legend
GP	Games played	GS	Games started	MPG	Minutes per game
FG%	Field-goal percentage	3P%	3-point field-goal percentage	FT%	Free-throw percentage
RPG	Rebounds per game	APG	Assists per game	SPG	Steals per game
BPG	Blocks per game	PPG	Points per game	PIR	Performance index rating
**Bold**	Career high

=== EuroLeague ===
Year	Team	GP	GS	MPG	FG%	3P%	FT%	RPG	APG	SPG	BPG	PPG	PIR
2014–15	Baskonia	14	10	**26.0**	**.445**	**.417**	**.864**	**2.4**	2.8	1.1	**.1**	12.2	10.2
2015–16	Baskonia	**29**	**29**	25.2	.395	.338	.827	2.2	**4.0**	**1.3**	**.1**	**13.2**	**12.0**
Career		43	39	25.5	.409	.358	.838	2.4	2.8	1.1	.1	12.9	11.4

=== Liga ACB ===
Year	Team	GP	GS	MPG	FG%	3P%	FT%	RPG	APG	SPG	BPG	PPG
2014–15	Baskonia	25	12	20.9	.380	.350	.833	2.0	2.4	1.3	.0	9.0
2015–16	Baskonia	41	34	25.7	.438	.384	.881	2.8	2.9	1.3	.1	16.4
Career		66	46	23.9	.416	.371	.862	2.5	2.7	1.3	.1	13.6

=== CBA ===
Year	Team	GP	GS	MPG	FG%	3P%	FT%	RPG	APG	SPG	BPG	PPG
2016–17	Xinjiang Flying Tigers	50	46	37.0	.465	.357	.875	5.8	5.9	2.2	.1	31.0
2017–18	Xinjiang Flying Tigers	41	40	43.1	.442	.334	.873	6.8	8.4	2.5	.2	38.7
2018–19	Xinjiang Flying Tigers	45	44	40.6	.457	.361	.869	7.5	8.4	2.8	.1	36.6
2019–20	Qingdao Eagles	14	13	35.2	.451	.306	.855	8.3	4.8	2.4	.4	33.8
Career		150	143	39.6	.455	.347	.871	6.8	7.2	2.5	.2	35.0
