= 2015 Gomelsky Cup =

The 2015 Gomelsky Cup is the 8th edition of the tournament. It will be played in the Universal Sports Hall in Moscow on October 3 and 4.

== Participant teams ==
Team	Qualified as	Appearance
(Russia) CSKA Moscow	Host team	8th
(Greece) Panathinaikos	Euroleague participant	7th
(Spain) Laboral Kutxa	Euroleague participant	1st
(Russia) UNICS Kazan	Eurocup participant	1st

== Tournament ==
Semifinals
(Greece) Panathinaikos	89
(Russia) UNICS Kazan	74
(Russia) CSKA Moscow	102
(Spain) Laboral Kutxa	74

Final
(Russia) CSKA Moscow	81
(Greece) Panathinaikos	80
Third place
(Russia) UNICS Kazan	90
(Spain) Laboral Kutxa	86

=== Semifinals ===
October 3, 2015

Panathinaikos (Greece)	89–74	(Russia) UNICS Kazan

Universal Sports Hall, Moscow

October 3, 2015

CSKA Moscow (Russia)	102–74	(Spain) Laboral Kutxa

Universal Sports Hall, Moscow

=== Third place ===
October 4, 2015

UNICS Kazan (Russia)	90–86 (OT)	(Spain) Laboral Kutxa

Universal Sports Hall, Moscow

=== Final ===
October 4, 2015

CSKA Moscow (Russia)	81–80	(Greece) Panathinaikos

Universal Sports Hall, Moscow
