= Justin Hamilton (basketball, born 1990) =

American-Croatian professional basketball player

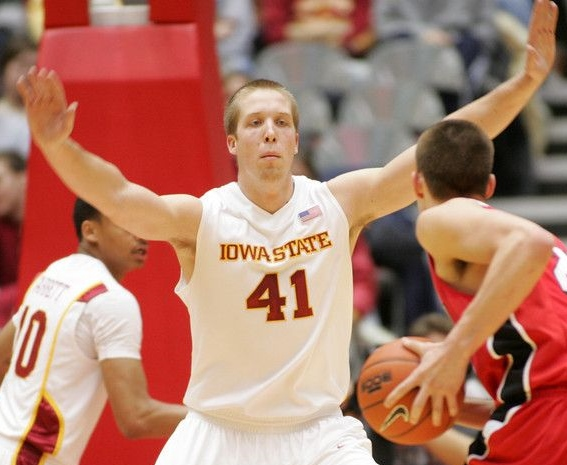
- Hamilton with the Iowa State Cyclones in 2009

Golden State Warriors
- Title: Video coordinator Player development coach
- League: NBA

Personal information
- Born: April 1, 1990 (age 36) Newport Beach, California, U.S.
- Listed height: 7 ft 0 in (2.13 m)
- Listed weight: 255 lb (116 kg)

Career information
- High school: Lone Peak (Highland, Utah)
- College: Iowa State (2008–2010); LSU (2011–2012)
- NBA draft: 2012: 2nd round, 45th overall pick
- Drafted by: Philadelphia 76ers
- Playing career: 2012–2023
- Position: Center
- Number: 7, 41
- Coaching career: 2024–present

Career history

Playing
- 2012–2013: Cibona
- 2013: VEF Rīga
- 2013–2014: Sioux Falls Skyforce
- 2014: Charlotte Bobcats
- 2014–2015: Miami Heat
- 2014: →Sioux Falls Skyforce
- 2015: Minnesota Timberwolves
- 2015–2016: Valencia
- 2016–2017: Brooklyn Nets
- 2017–2021: Beijing Ducks
- 2022: Manresa
- 2022–2023: Guangdong Southern Tigers

Coaching
- 2024–present: Golden State Warriors (assistant)

Career highlights
- All-ACB First Team (2016); NBA D-League All-Star (2014); All-NBA D-League First Team (2014); NBA D-League All-Defensive First Team (2014); Latvian League champion (2013); Second-team All-SEC (2012)
- Stats at NBA.com
- Stats at Basketball Reference

Justin Anthony Hamilton (born April 1, 1990) is a Croatian-American professional basketball coach and former player who is a video coordinator and player development coach for the Golden State Warriors of the National Basketball Association (NBA). He played college basketball for the Iowa State Cyclones and the LSU Tigers.

== College career ==
Hamilton played college basketball for the Iowa State Cyclones from 2008 to 2010 under Greg McDermott, and Louisiana State University during the 2011–12 season under Trent Johnson after being required to redshirt the 2010–11 season due to NCAA transfer requirements.

== Professional career ==
Hamilton was selected with the 45th overall in the 2012 NBA draft by the Philadelphia 76ers. He was then traded to the Miami Heat for the rights of Arnett Moultrie.

In August 2012, Hamilton signed with KK Cibona and has expressed a desire to play for the Croatian national basketball team. In January 2013, he moved to VEF Rīga after an agreement with Cibona allowed him to switch clubs. He left the team in May.

On September 10, 2013, he signed with the Miami Heat. However, he was waived on October 26.

On October 31, 2013, he was acquired by the Sioux Falls Skyforce. On February 3, 2014, Hamilton was named to the Futures All-Star roster for the 2014 NBA D-League All-Star Game.

On March 4, 2014, he signed a 10-day contract with the Charlotte Bobcats. He made his only appearance for the Bobcats on March 8 in a loss to Memphis Grizzlies.

On March 14, 2014, he signed with the Miami Heat for the rest of the season. On March 20, 2014, he was assigned to the Sioux Falls Skyforce. On March 24, 2014, he was recalled by the Heat. The Heat made the 2014 NBA Finals, where they lost to the San Antonio Spurs in five games. Hamilton did not play a game in the 2014 playoffs for Miami.

On February 19, 2015, Hamilton was traded to the New Orleans Pelicans in a three-team trade involving the Phoenix Suns. On March 3, 2015, he was waived by the Pelicans before appearing in a game for them. Two days later, he was claimed off waivers by the Minnesota Timberwolves.

On July 27, 2015, Hamilton signed a one-year deal with Valencia of the Liga ACB and the Eurocup. Valencia reached the league's semi-finals and Hamilton earned All-Liga ACB First Team honours as the top power forward in the league.

On July 11, 2016, Hamilton signed a multi-year contract with the Brooklyn Nets. He made his debut for the Nets in their season opener on October 26, 2016, against the Boston Celtics. In 25 minutes off the bench, he recorded a career-high 19 points and 10 rebounds in a 122–117 loss. On December 20, 2016, he grabbed a career-high 11 rebounds in a 116–104 loss to the Toronto Raptors.

On July 13, 2017, Hamilton was traded to the Toronto Raptors in exchange for DeMarre Carroll, a future first-round pick and a future second-round pick. The next day, he was waived by the Raptors.

On July 22, 2017, Hamilton signed with the Beijing Ducks of the Chinese Basketball Association.

On August 14, 2022, he has signed with Baxi Manresa of the Liga ACB.

== Coaching career ==
On August 31, 2024, Hamilton retired from professional basketball to join the Golden State Warriors as a video coordinator and player development coach.

== NBA career statistics ==
Legend
GP	Games played	GS	Games started	MPG	Minutes per game
FG%	Field goal percentage	3P%	3-point field goal percentage	FT%	Free throw percentage
RPG	Rebounds per game	APG	Assists per game	SPG	Steals per game
BPG	Blocks per game	PPG	Points per game	**Bold**	Career high

=== Regular season ===
Year	Team	GP	GS	MPG	FG%	3P%	FT%	RPG	APG	SPG	BPG	PPG
2013–14	Charlotte	1	0	4.0	.000	.000	.000	.0	.0	1.0	.0	.0
2013–14	Miami	7	0	9.7	.450	**.333**	**1.000**	1.0	.0	.6	.0	3.7
2014–15	Miami	24	5	12.0	.415	.316	.857	2.0	.5	.3	.2	2.8
2014–15	Minnesota	17	**9**	**24.9**	**.513**	**.333**	.825	**5.1**	**1.4**	**1.1**	**1.5**	**9.0**
2016–17	Brooklyn	**64**	7	18.4	.459	.306	.750	4.1	0.9	0.5	0.7	6.9
Career		113	21	13.8	.367	.258	.686	2.4	.6	.5	.5	4.5

== Personal life ==
Hamilton is of Croatian ancestry on his mother side, who is from Zagreb, Croatia. Hamilton spent 1 year of his life in Croatia, attending the elementary school "Pantovčak" in Zagreb.
