= Mamadou Diop (basketball, born 1993) =

Senegalese-Spanish basketball player

Free agent
- Position: Power forward / small forward

Personal information
- Born: 14 February 1993 (age 33) Guédiawaye, Senegal
- Listed height: 2.04 m (6 ft 8 in)
- Listed weight: 95 kg (209 lb)

Career information
- NBA draft: 2015: undrafted
- Playing career: 2011–present

Career history
- 2011–2016: Saski Baskonia
- 2011–2012: →Fundación Baskonia
- 2012: → UPV Álava
- 2012–2013: → CEBA Guadalajara
- 2013–2014: → Xuven Cambados
- 2016–2017: Melco Ieper

Mamadou Diop Gaye (born 14 February 1993) is a professional basketball player who last played for Melco Ieper of the Top Division 1, the second basketball tier of Belgium.

== Player profile ==
Diop is a tall forward who can play as a small forward or power forward. He has great physical and athletic attributes, but also has a good outside shot and a variety of movements. His speed allows him to run the counter-attack and he also has very good play vision.

== Professional career ==
Mamadou Diop Gaye came to Spain in 2008 to play for the youth teams of Villa de Adeje. Years later he moved to Laboral Kutxa, starting to play in a 2011–12 season with their reserve team in the fifth tier, only to finish the season in UPV Álava of Liga EBA (fourth division). Over the season, he has shown solid performances, averaging 12 points and 4 rebounds per game. In a 2012–13 season he was sent on loan to the CEBA Guadalajara of the LEB Plata (third tier), reaching with his team the semifinals of the promotion playoffs to LEB Oro (second tier). In the 2013–14 he was again loaned in order to continue his development in Conservas de Cambados of the same league.

For the 2014–15 season, Diop made the roster of Laboral Kutxa for the Liga ACB. On September 2, he debuted and scored his first points in a preseason game against Gipuzkoa Basket. On December 28, Diop made his first appearance in the ACB, against Baloncesto Sevilla.

On June 28, 2016, Diop parted ways with Baskonia and signed with Belgian club Melco Ieper.

== International appearances ==
Diop has played in the Spain national youth teams.

In summer 2010, he was selected by Diego Ocampo to participate with the U-17 team in the 2010 World Championship in Hamburg, Germany.

In April 2011, he played with the U-18 team in the Vilagarcía Basket Cup.

In 2012, he was selected by Luis Guil to participate in the European U-20 Championships in Slovenia.

In 2013 he was again shortlisted with the U-20 team, this time coached by Sito Alonso, to participate in the 2013 European Championship.

== Personal life ==
Diop has a younger brother, Ilimane, who plays for Laboral Kutxa Baskonia.

== Trophies ==
With CEBA Guadalajara

- Copa LEB Plata (2013)
