= Kim Tillie =

French basketball player (born 1988)

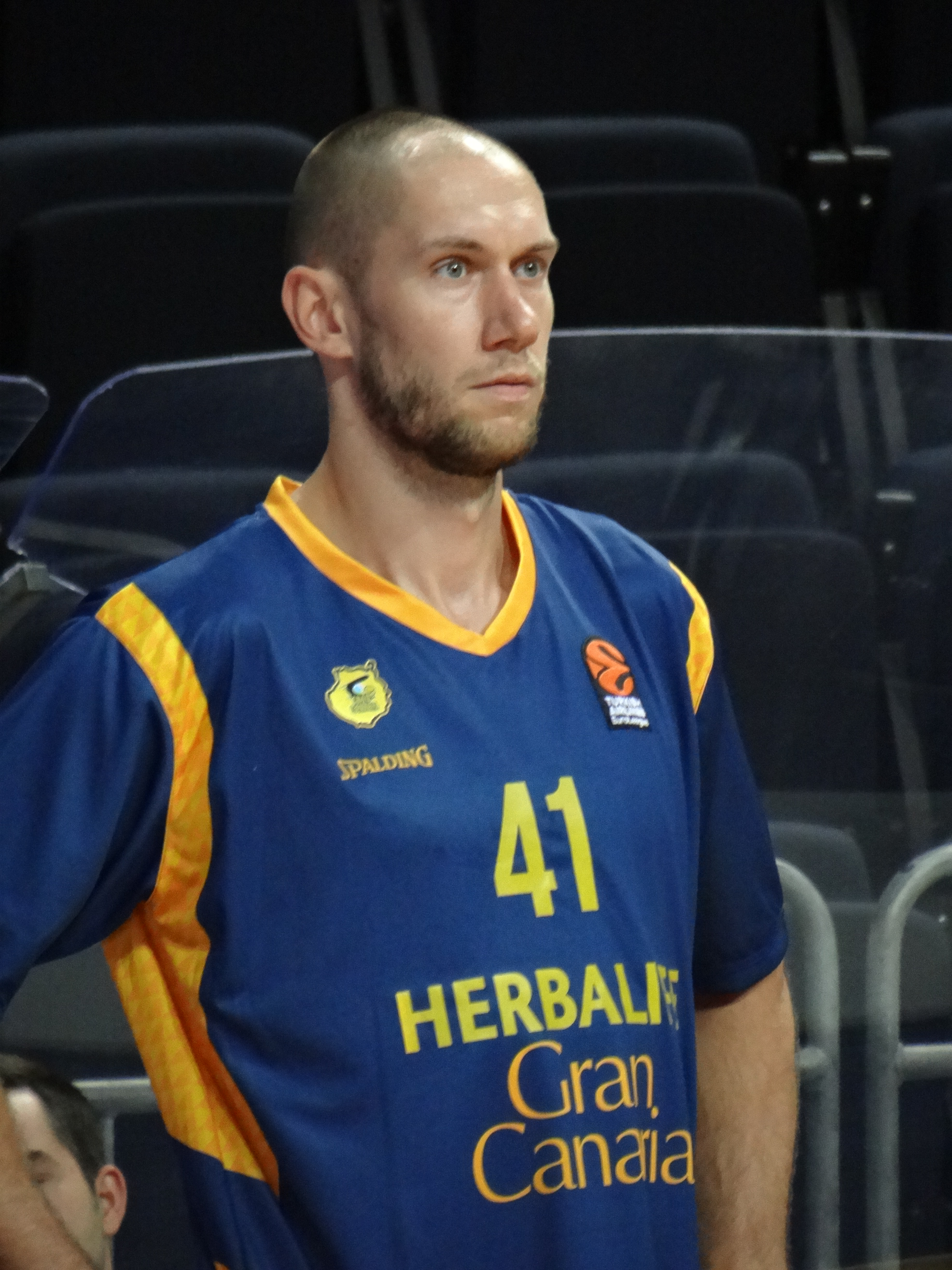
- Tillie with Gran Canaria, in 2018

Personal information
- Born: 15 July 1988 (age 38) Cagnes-sur-Mer, France
- Listed height: 6 ft 11 in (2.11 m)
- Listed weight: 232 lb (105 kg)

Career information
- High school: Lycée Jean de la Fontaine (Paris, France)
- College: Utah (2006–2010)
- NBA draft: 2010: undrafted
- Playing career: 2010–2024
- Position: Power forward / center

Career history
- 2010–2012: ASVEL
- 2012–2014: Murcia
- 2014–2017: Baskonia
- 2017–2018: Olympiacos
- 2018–2019: Gran Canaria
- 2019–2020: Monaco
- 2020: Budućnost
- 2020–2021: Ryukyu Golden Kings
- 2021–2022: Kolossos Rodou
- 2022–2024: Cholet

Career highlights
- French All-Star Game (2012)
Medals
Men's basketball
Representing France
FIBA World Cup
Bronze medal – third place	2014 Spain
FIBA Under-19 World Cup
Bronze medal – third place	2007 Serbia	U-19 Team
FIBA Europe Under-18 Championship
Gold medal – first place	2006 Greece	U-18 Team

Kim Tillie (born 15 July 1988) is a French former professional basketball player. He played college basketball at the University of Utah. He is a 2.11 m (6 ft 11 in) tall power forward, who could also play as a small ball center.

== Early years ==
Tillie graduated from Lycee Jean de la Fontaine High School, in Paris, France, where he played high school basketball. As a youth, he also played basketball with the junior teams of the club Paris Basket Racing.

== College career ==
Tillie played 4 seasons of college basketball at the University of Utah, with the Utah Utes, from 2006 to 2010. He wasn't drafted in the 2010 NBA draft.

== Professional career ==
After his college basketball career, Tillie returned to France, in May 2010, and signed a two-year deal with ASVEL. In July 2011, he extended his contract with ASVEL. He played with the Washington Wizards' summer league squad in the 2012 NBA Summer League.

In July 2012, he left France, and signed a two-year deal with UCAM Murcia of the Spanish Liga ACB. In July 2014, he signed a one-year deal with the Spanish EuroLeague club Baskonia. In July 2017, he signed a two-year deal with the Greek EuroLeague club Olympiacos. However, he was waived on 5 July 2018.

On 25 July 2018 Tillie signed a one-year deal with Herbalife Gran Canaria of the Liga ACB and the EuroLeague. On 8 July 2019 Tillie signed a one-year deal with AS Monaco of the LNB Pro A.

On 6 February 2020 he signed with Budućnost of the Adriatic League. Tillie signed with Ryukyu Golden Kings on 6 July 2020.

On August 2, 2021, Tillie returned to Greece, signing with Kolossos Rodou. In 22 games, he averaged 8.5 points, 5.6 rebounds, 0.8 assists and 0.8 steals, playing around 24 minutes per contest.

On July 25, 2022, he returned to France, signing with Cholet Basket.

== National team career ==
Tillie was a member of the junior national teams of France. With France's junior national teams, he played at the 2006 Albert Schweitzer Tournament, where he won a gold medal, the 2006 FIBA Europe Under-18 Championship, where he won a gold medal, the 2007 FIBA Under-19 World Cup, where he won a bronze medal, and the 2008 FIBA Europe Under-20 Championship.

Tillie has also been a member of the senior French national basketball team. With France's senior national team, he has played at the 2014 FIBA Basketball World Cup, where he won a bronze medal, and at the 2016 Summer Olympics.

== Career statistics ==
Legend
GP	Games played	GS	Games started	MPG	Minutes per game
FG%	Field-goal percentage	3P%	3-point field-goal percentage	FT%	Free-throw percentage
RPG	Rebounds per game	APG	Assists per game	SPG	Steals per game
BPG	Blocks per game	PPG	Points per game	PIR	Performance index rating
**Bold**	Career high

=== EuroLeague ===
Year	Team	GP	GS	MPG	FG%	3P%	FT%	RPG	APG	SPG	BPG	PPG	PIR
2014–15	Baskonia	24	1	18.1	.452	.385	.773	**4.6**	1.0	.8	.1	5.5	6.8
2015–16	Baskonia	29	**21**	**22.4**	.456	.267	.717	3.8	.9	**1.0**	**.2**	6.0	6.3
2016–17	Baskonia	**32**	15	19.1	**.549**	.407	**.912**	3.8	**1.1**	.7	**.2**	**6.9**	**8.2**
2017–18	Olympiacos	10	3	16.1	.481	**.571**	.571	2.4	.5	.2	**.2**	3.8	3.1
Career		95	40	19.6	.489	.387	.780	3.9	.7	.2	.2	5.9	6.7

== Personal life ==
Tillie's father, Laurent Tillie, is a former professional volleyball player and coach of the French national volleyball team. He is also the brother of Kevin Tillie, a professional volleyball player, and Killian Tillie, who previously played in the NBA with the Memphis Grizzlies.
