= Albert Oliver =

Spanish basketball player

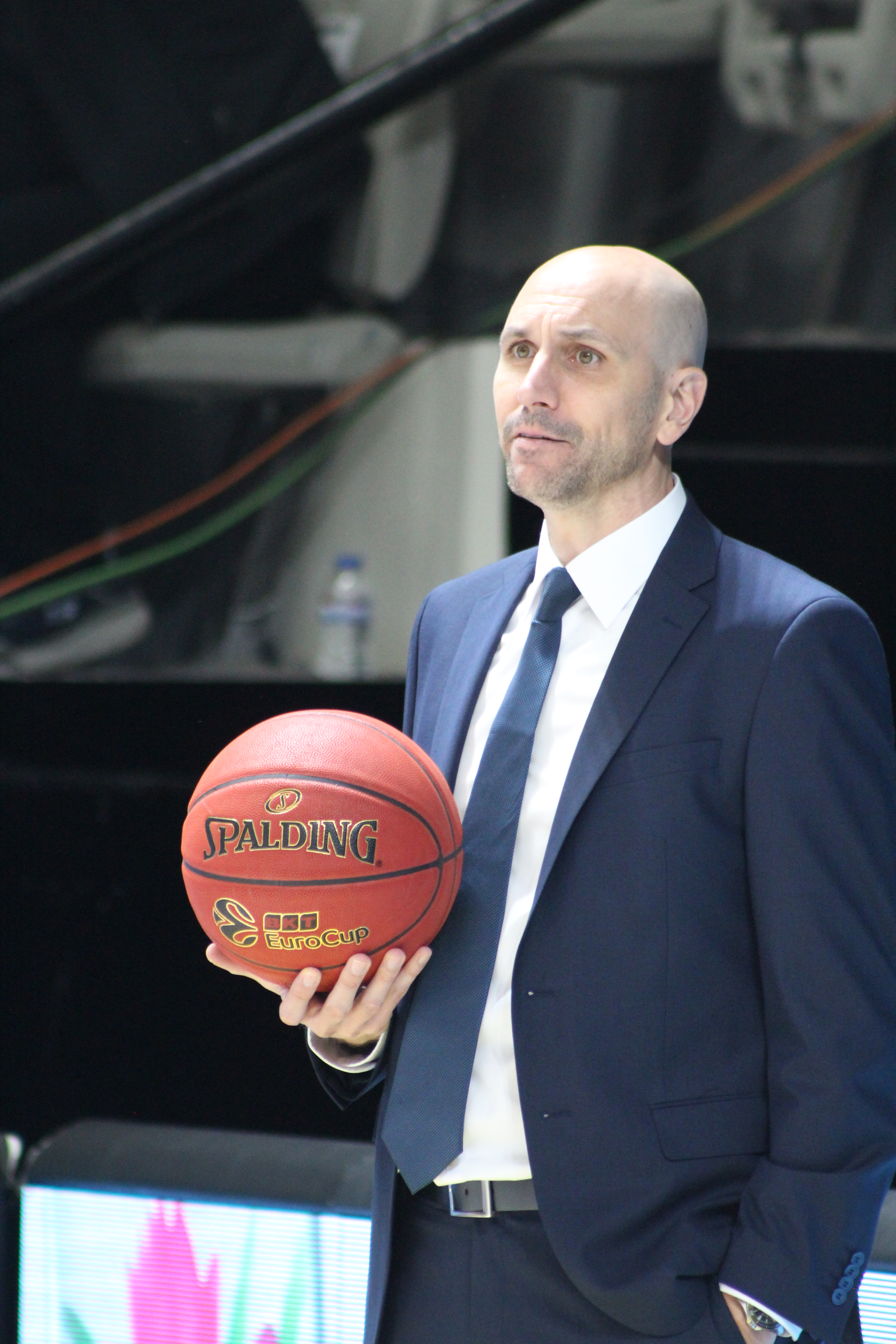
- Oliver with Gran Canaria in 2024

La Laguna Tenerife
- Position: Assistant coach
- League: Liga ACB; EuroCup

Personal information
- Born: June 4, 1978 (age 48) Terrassa, Spain
- Listed height: 6 ft 2 in (1.88 m)
- Listed weight: 185 lb (84 kg)

Career information
- Playing career: 1997–present

Career history

Playing
- 1997–1999: Joventut
- 1999–2001: Lleida
- 2001–2006: Manresa
- 2006–2009: Valencia
- 2009–2011: Estudiantes
- 2011–2013: Joventut
- 2013–2019: Gran Canaria
- 2019–2020: Real Betis
- 2020–2022: Obradoiro

Coaching
- 2023–2025: Gran Canaria (assistant)
- 2025–2026: FC Barcelona (assistant)
- 2026–present: La Laguna Tenerife (assistant)

Career highlights
- Spanish Supercup winner (2016); LEB Oro champion (2001)

Albert Oliver Campos (born June 4, 1978) is a Spanish professional basketball coach and former player. He currently serves as an assistant coach for La Laguna Tenerife of the Liga ACB and the EuroCup. Standing at 1.88 m (6 ft 2 in), he played at the point guard position.

== Professional career ==
On July 26, 2013, Oliver signed a two-year deal with Herbalife Gran Canaria of the Liga ACB. He re-signed with Gran Canaria on July 4, 2018. On October 12, 2018, at the age of 40, Oliver made his EuroLeague debut, and subsequently became the oldest player to score in the modern era of EuroLeague, since 2000.

On July 10, 2019, Oliver signed with Real Betis for the 2019-20 season. He averaged 5.6 points per game.

On September 11, 2020, he signed a two-month deal with Obradoiro. The deal was extended to the end of the season on November 15. On July 10, 2021, Oliver signed a new one-year contract with the club.

After retiring as a player, Oliver started coaching. He became an assistant coach for CB Gran Canaria in 2023, before joining FC Barcelona in 2025. In July 2026, he joined the coaching staff of La Laguna Tenerife of the Liga ACB and the EuroCup.

== Honours ==
Caprabo Lleida

- LEB: (1)
  - 2001

Gran Canaria

- Supercopa de España: (1)
  - 2016
