= Ilimane Diop =

Senegalese-Spanish basketball player

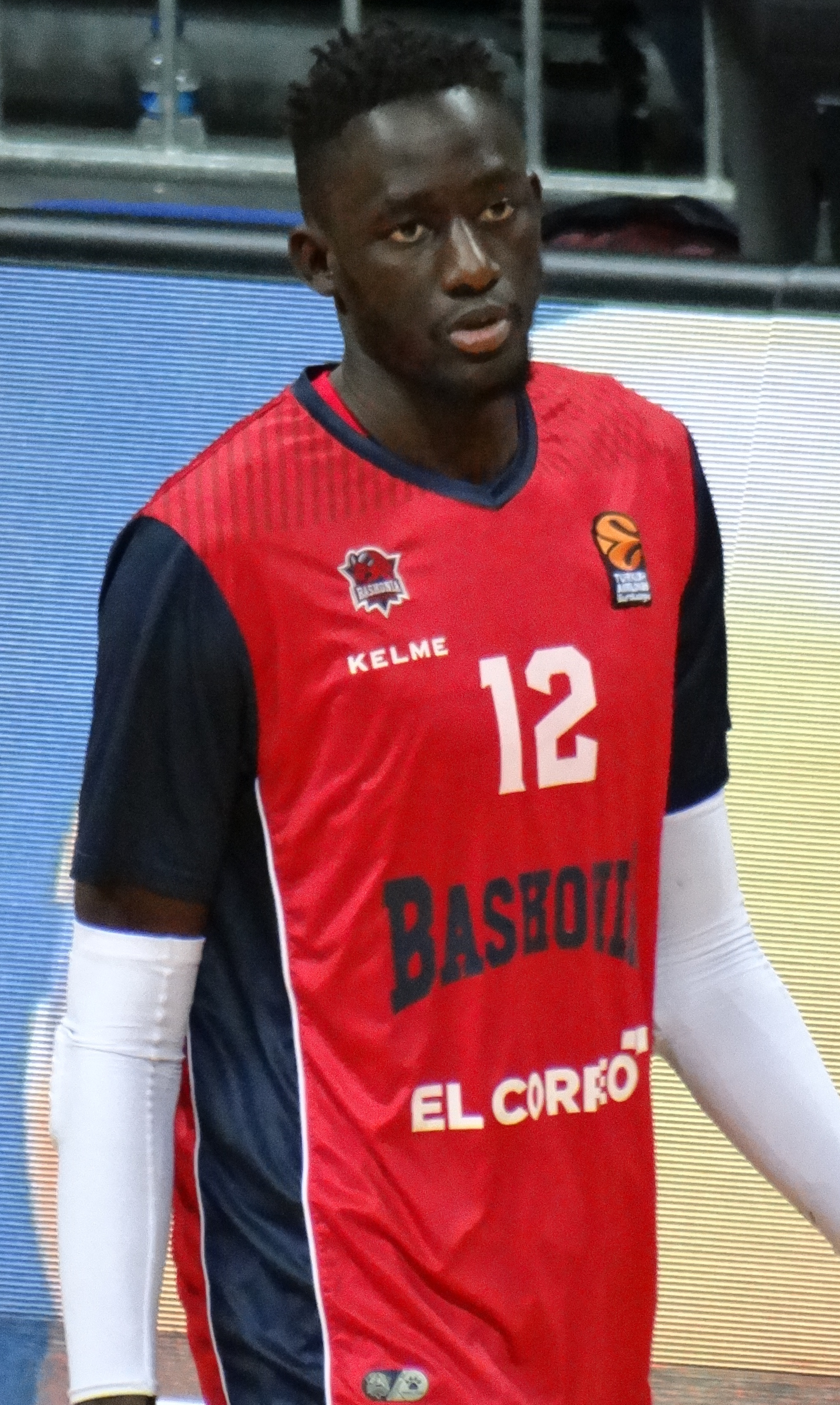
- Diop for Baskonia in 2017

No. 21 – Básquet Coruña
- Position: Center
- League: Primera FEB

Personal information
- Born: 4 April 1995 (age 31) Dakar, Senegal
- Listed height: 6 ft 11 in (2.11 m)
- Listed weight: 230 lb (104 kg)

Career information
- NBA draft: 2017: undrafted
- Playing career: 2011–present

Career history
- 2011–2021: Baskonia
- 2011–2012: →Álava
- 2012–2013: →Araberri
- 2021–2022: Gran Canaria
- 2022–2023: UCAM Murcia
- 2023: Unicaja
- 2023–2024: Filou Oostende
- 2024–2025: Lenovo Tenerife
- 2025: Al Riyadi
- 2025–present: Básquet Coruña

Career highlights
- ACB champion (2020)
Medals
Men's basketball
Representing Spain
FIBA Europe Under-18 Championship
Bronze medal – third place	2013 Latvia	Spain
FIBA Europe Under-16 Championship
Bronze medal – third place	2011 Czech Republic	Spain

Ilimane Diop Gaye (born 4 April 1995) is a professional basketball player for Básquet Coruña of the Primera FEB. Although he was born in Senegal, Diop officially represents Spain when being on international duty since he was a baby when his family settled in Spain. Previously, he has led their junior teams to multiple bronze medals.

== Professional career ==
A product of Spanish powerhouse Saski Baskonia, Diop was sent out on loan to minor league team to gain playing time and experience. He made his debut for Baskonia in the Spanish top-flight Liga ACB in the course of the 2013-14 campaign.

An early entry candidate for the 2016 NBA draft, he later withdrew his name.

On 10 July 2021, he signed with Gran Canaria of the Spanish Liga ACB.

On 5 July 2022, Gran Canaria released Diop.

On 13 July 2022, he signed with UCAM Murcia in the Liga ACB.

On 20 August 2023, he signed with Unicaja of the Spanish Liga ACB.

On 4 October 2023, he signed with Filou Oostende of the BNXT League.

On 11 January 2024, he signed with Lenovo Tenerife of the Spanish Liga ACB.

On 18 January 2025, Diop signed with Al Riyadi of the Lebanese Basketball League.

== International career ==
After achieving a bronze medal with the under-16 team and the under-18 team, on 11 July 2016, Diop made his debut with the national team in a friendly game played in Burgos against Angola. He scored four points and grabbed three rebounds to collaborate in the win by 85–61.

== Player profile ==
Standing 6 ft 11 in with a 7 ft 11 in wingspan, Diop has been described as a notable Liga ACB prospect and a possible future NBA draft candidate. His size has been cited as a challenge for opponents, particularly in pick-and-roll situations and rebounding. He has also been noted for his physical potential, while balance, footwork and strength have been identified as areas for development for the center.

== Personal life ==
His brother Mamadou is also a basketball player who previously played in the same Spanish basketball squad as he did.
