= 2015–16 Bilbao Basket season =

Dominion Bilbao Basket
2015–16 season
- Chairman: Xabier Davalillo
- Head coach: Sito Alonso
- Arena: Bilbao Arena
- Liga ACB: TBD
- Copa del Rey: Semifinalists
- Eurocup: 3rd / Last 32
Home	Away

The 2015–16 season is Dominion Bilbao Basket's 16th in existence and the club's 12th consecutive season in the top flight of Spanish basketball. Bilbao is involved in three competitions.

== Players ==
=== Squad information ===
Note: Flags indicate national team eligibility at FIBA-sanctioned events. Players may hold other non-FIBA nationalities not displayed.

Dominion Bilbao Basket roster
Players
Coaches

Pos.	No.	Nat.	Name	Ht.	Wt.	Age
C	4	(Niger)	Aboubacar, Seydou	2.07 m (6 ft 9 in)		32 – 9 May 1994
C	25	(Slovenia)	Begić, Mirza	2.21 m (7 ft 3 in)	120 kg (265 lb)	41 – 9 July 1985
SG	9	(Latvia)	Bertāns, Dairis	1.93 m (6 ft 4 in)	84 kg (185 lb)	36 – 9 September 1989
C	13	(Greece)	Bogris, Georgios	2.10 m (6 ft 11 in)	109 kg (240 lb)	37 – 19 February 1989
SG	8	(Sweden)	Borg, Tobias	1.84 m (6 ft 0 in)	81 kg (179 lb)	32 – 2 November 1993
PG	21	(Nigeria)	Erevbenagie, Etinosa	1.86 m (6 ft 1 in)	85 kg (187 lb)	31 – 16 May 1995
PG	11	(United States)	Hannah, Clevin	1.80 m (5 ft 11 in)	75 kg (165 lb)	38 – 15 November 1987
PF	17	(Belgium)	Hervelle, Axel	2.05 m (6 ft 9 in)	109 kg (240 lb)	43 – 12 May 1983
PG	31	(Spain)	López, Raül	1.83 m (6 ft 0 in)	84 kg (185 lb)	46 – 15 April 1980
SF	10	(Spain)	Mendía, Borja	1.99 m (6 ft 6 in)	89 kg (196 lb)	31 – 10 November 1994
SF	15	(Spain)	Mumbrú, Álex (C)	2.02 m (6 ft 8 in)	100 kg (220 lb)	47 – 12 June 1979
SF	7	(United States)	Ruoff, Alex	1.98 m (6 ft 6 in)	100 kg (220 lb)	40 – 29 August 1986
C	5	(Lithuania)	Šležas, Tautvydas	2.06 m (6 ft 9 in)	216 kg (476 lb)	36 – 31 March 1990
PF	33	(Spain)	Suárez, Álex	2.04 m (6 ft 8 in)	92 kg (203 lb)	32 – 27 September 1993
SF	20	(Serbia)	Todorović, Dejan (injured)	1.96 m (6 ft 5 in)	89 kg (196 lb)	32 – 29 May 1994
F/C	19	(Montenegro)	Todorović, Marko	2.09 m (6 ft 10 in)	111 kg (245 lb)	34 – 19 April 1992

Head coach

- (Spain) Sito Alonso

Assistant coach(es)

- (Spain) Óscar Lata

Legend

- (C) Team captain
- Injured

- Roster
Updated: April 1, 2016

=== Players in ===
No.	Pos.	Nat.	Name	Age	Moving from		Type	Ends	Transfer fee	Date	Source
7	SF	(United States)	Alex Ruoff	28	Göttingen	(Germany)	Expired contract	2 years	Free	June 29, 2015	
13	C	(Greece)	Georgios Bogris	26	MoraBanc Andorra	(Andorra)	Expired contract	2 years	Free	July 20, 2015	
11	PG	(United States)	Clevin Hannah	27	FIATC Joventut	(Spain)	Expired contract	2 years	Free	July 24, 2015	
33	PF	(Spain)	Álex Suárez	21	Real Madrid	(Spain)	Loan	1 year	Free	August 13, 2015	
5	C	(Guyana)	Shawn James	31	EA7 Emporio Armani Milano	(Italy)	Expired contract	1 year	Free	August 17, 2015	
25	C	(Slovenia)	Mirza Begić	30	Laboral Kutxa Baskonia	(Spain)	Expired contract	1 year	Free	December 7, 2015	
5	C	(Lithuania)	Tautvydas Šležas	25	Cáceres Patrimonio de la Humanidad	(Spain)	Transfer	1 year	–	February 8, 2016	
19	PF	(Montenegro)	Marko Todorović	24	Khimki Moscow Region	(Russia)	Loan	1 year	Free	February 8, 2016	

Total spending: ▼€0

=== Players out ===
No.	Pos.	Nat.	Name	Age	Moving to		Type	Transfer fee	Date	Source
34	PF	(United States)	Ethan Wragge	24	Giessen 46ers	(Germany)	Expired contract	Free	June 30, 2015	
10	PG	(Spain)	Quino Colom	26	UNICS Kazan	(Russia)	Expired contract	Free	July 10, 2015	
14	C	(Montenegro)	Marko Todorović	23	Khimki	(Russia)	End of loan	Free	July 14, 2015	
33	SG	(Serbia)	Danilo Anđušić	24	Partizan NIS	(Serbia)	Termination of contract	–	July 19, 2015	
21	C	(United States)	Latavious Williams	26	UNICS Kazan	(Russia)	Expired contract	Free	July 20, 2015	
5	C	(Guyana)	Shawn James	31	Olympiacos	(Greece)	Termination of contract	€20,000	December 4, 2015	

Total income: ▲€20,000

Total expenditure: ▲€20,000

== Club ==
=== Technical staff ===
Position	Staff
Head Coach	Sito Alonso
Assistant coach	Oscar Lata
Delegate	Mikel Torre
Doctor	Javier Gil
Physical trainer	Alvaro Gómez-Rubiera
Physiotherapist	Josean Betolaza
Osteopath	Aitz Landaida
Manager of material	Rafael Muñoz; Fernando Pérez

Source: Bilbao Basket

=== Kit ===
Supplier: Erreà / Sponsor: Dominion

Home	Away

== Pre-season and friendlies ==
Win Loss

5 September 2015 1	Zornotza ST	66–89	Dominion Bilbao Basket	Zornotza
	Scoring by quarter: 19–21, 17–21, 16–22, 14–25
	Pts: Nkaloulou 16; Rebs: Salazar 9 Asts: Salazar 2 PIR: García, Salazar 15	Boxscore	Pts: Mumbrú 19; Rebs: James 6 Asts: López 6 PIR: Mumbrú 24	Arena: Larrea; Attendance: 600; Referees: Sacristan, Mohedas, Manuel

15 September 2015 2	Dominion Bilbao Basket	83–76	ICL Manresa	Ibiza
	Scoring by quarter: 32–30, 2–0, 28–27, 21–19
	Pts: López, Ruoff 19; Rebs: James 4 Asts: Hannah 5 PIR: López 22	Boxscore	Pts: Grigonis 16; Rebs: Musli 6 Asts: Hernández, Montañez 3 PIR: Thomas 16	Arena: Can Guerxo; Attendance: 1,000

19 September 2015 3	RETAbet.es GBC	75–79	Dominion Bilbao Basket	Azpeitia
	Scoring by quarter: 26–25, 24–12, 8–18, 17–24
	Pts: Milbourne 13; Rebs: Grimau 3 Asts: Llompart 7 PIR: Grimau 13	Boxscore	Pts: Hannah 18; Rebs: James 3 Asts: Borg 4 PIR: Mumbrú 18	Arena: Polideportivo de Azpeitia; Attendance: 350; Referees: García González, Sánchez, Manuel

25 September 2015 4	Rio Natura Monbus Obradoiro	70–72	Dominion Bilbao Basket	Burgos
	Scoring by quarter: 13–13, 21–14, 16–24, 20–21
	Pts: Haws 14; Rebs: Triguero, Caloiaro 4 Asts: Haws 4 PIR: Triguero, Pozas 13	Boxscore	Pts: Mumbrú 14; Rebs: Hervelle 12; Asts: Ruoff 4 PIR: Hervelle 15	Arena: Coliseum de Burgos; Attendance: 1,000; Referees: Sacristán, Sanchez Mohedas, Manuel

27 September 2015 5	Dominion Bilbao Basket	54–85	Valencia Basket	Burgos
	Scoring by quarter: 20–18, 11–21, 11–20, 12–26
	Pts: Ruoff 12; Rebs: James 6 Asts: Mumbrú 3 PIR: Bertāns 10	Boxscore	Pts: Dubljević 22; Rebs: Sikma 6 Asts: three players 5 PIR: Sikma 26	Arena: Coliseum de Burgos; Attendance: 1,500; Referees: Martínez Fernández, Sanchez Mohedas, Manuel

29 September 2015 6	Dominion Bilbao Basket	85–75	FIATC Joventut	Monzón
	Scoring by quarter: 26–20, 20–21, 20–16, 19–18
	Pts: Mumbrú 15; Rebs: Mumbrú 5 Asts: López 4 PIR: López 19	Boxscore	Pts: Paul 15; Rebs: Drame, Miralles 4 Asts: Sàbat, Vidal 3 PIR: Vidal18	Arena: Pabellón Municipal de Monzón; Referees: Peruga, Aliaga, Cardús

1 October 2015 7	Dominion Bilbao Basket	90–65	ICL Manresa	Vielha
		Boxscore		Arena: Palai d esports d Vielha; Referees: Perea, Cardús, Munar

4 October 2015 8	CAI Zaragoza	75–79	Dominion Bilbao Basket	Ejea de los Caballeros
	Scoring by quarter: 18–21, 28–16, 13–17, 16–25
	Pts: Jelovac 15; Rebs: Jelovac 8 Asts: Henry 4 PIR: Jelovac 26	Boxscore	Pts: Hannah 21; Rebs: Bogris 4 Asts: four players 2	Referees: Guirao, Sanchez Mohedas, Munar

== Competitions ==
=== Overall ===
Competition	Started round	Current position / round	Final position / round	First match	Last match
Liga ACB	Matchday 1	8th		11 October 2015	
Copa del Rey	Quarterfinals	—	Semifinalists	18 February 2016	20 February 2016
Eurocup	Regular season	—	3rd / Last 32	14 October 2015	10 February 2016

Updated to match played February 20, 2016
Source: Competitions

=== Overview ===
Competition	Record							
Competition	G	W	D	L	PF	PA	PD	Win %
Liga ACB	20	10	0	10	1,556	1,601	−45	50.00
Copa del Rey	2	1	0	1	144	153	−9	50.00
Eurocup	16	11	0	5	1,339	1,193	+146	68.75
Total	38	22	0	16	3,039	2,947	+92	57.89

Updated to match played February 20, 2016
Source: Competitions

=== Liga ACB ===
==== League table ====
Pos	Team	Pld	W	L	PF	PA	PD	Qualification or relegation
8	Montakit Fuenlabrada	34	17	17	2793	2854	−61	Qualification to playoffs
9	Iberostar Tenerife	34	16	18	2610	2708	−98	
10	Dominion Bilbao Basket	34	16	18	2647	2726	−79	
11	Baloncesto Sevilla	34	14	20	2662	2873	−211	
12	CAI Zaragoza	34	13	21	2719	2777	−58	

Source: ACB

==== Results summary ====
Overall						Home					Away				
Pld	W	L	PF	PA	PD	W	L	PF	PA	PD	W	L	PF	PA	PD
20	10	10	1556	1601	−45	5	5	844	845	−1	5	5	712	756	−44

Last updated: February 14, 2016.
Source: Competitive matches

==== Results by round ====
Round	1	2	3	4	5	6	7	8	9	10	11	12	13	14	15	16	17	18	19	20	21	22	23	24	25	26
Ground	A	H	A	H	A	H	A	H	A	H	H	A	H	H	A	A	H	A	H	A	H	A	A	H	A	H
Result	W	L	W	W	L	L	W	L	L	W	L	L	W	L	W	W	W	L	W	L						
Position	5	13	10	7	9	10	8	9	11	10	9	12	8	11	8	8	6	9	8	8						

Updated to match(es) played on February 14, 2016. Source: Competitive matches
A = Away; H = Home; W = Win; D = Draw; L = Loss

==== Matches ====
Win Loss

11 October 2015 1	MoraBanc Andorra	69–79	Dominion Bilbao Basket	Andorra la Vella
19:00 (CEST)	Scoring by quarter: 21–25, 14–16, 19–17, 15–21
	Pts: Navarro 17; Rebs: Shermadini 5 Asts: Navarro 4 PIR: Navarro 23	Boxscore	Pts: Mumbrú 15; Rebs: Hervelle 5 Asts: Bogris 4 PIR: James 16	Arena: Poliesportiu d'Andorra; Attendance: 3,815; Referees: Conde, Peruga, Zamorano

18 October 2015 2	Dominion Bilbao Basket	59–85	Herbalife Gran Canaria	Bilbao
13:00 (CEST)	Scoring by quarter: 14–13, 19–23, 16–21, 10–28
	Pts: James 10; Rebs: James 8 Asts: Hervelle, López 3 PIR: James 16	Boxscore	Pts: Oliver 17; Rebs: Omić 12; Asts: Oliver 4 PIR: Báez, Omić 18	Arena: Bilbao Arena; Attendance: 8,106; Referees: Jiménez Trujillo, Calatrava, Caballero

25 October 2015 3	RETAbet.es GBC	63–75	Dominion Bilbao Basket	San Sebastián
13:00 (CET)	Scoring by quarter: 14–18, 13–28, 17–13, 19–16
	Pts: Doblas 14; Rebs: Grimau, Llompart 6 Asts: Llompart 3 PIR: Doblas 18	Boxscore	Pts: Mumbrú 20; Rebs: Mumbrú 7 Asts: López 4 PIR: Mumbrú 27	Arena: San Sebastián Arena; Attendance: 4,000; Referees: Hierrezuelo, Oyón, Fernández

1 November 2015 4	Dominion Bilbao Basket	88–70	Unicaja	Bilbao
19:30 (CET)	Scoring by quarter: 24–13, 22–17, 26–20, 16–20
	Pts: Bertāns, Mumbrú 18; Rebs: James 6 Asts: Hannah 7 PIR: Mumbrú 20	Boxscore	Pts: Kuzminskas 17; Rebs: Hendrix, Thomas 8 Asts: Marković 3 PIR: Kuzminskas 19	Arena: Bilbao Arena; Attendance: 9,102; Referees: Pérez Pérez, Castillo, Pérez Niz

8 November 2015 5	UCAM Murcia	96–68	Dominion Bilbao Basket	Murcia
13:00 (CET)	Scoring by quarter: 22–19, 21–26, 28–14, 25–9
	Pts: Antelo 18; Rebs: Lima 9 Asts: Campazzo 7 PIR: Antelo 27	Boxscore	Pts: Hannah 13; Rebs: Hervelle 5 Asts: Bertāns 3 PIR: Hannah 11	Arena: Palacio de Deportes; Attendance: 5,748; Referees: Martín Bertrán, García Ortiz, Cardús

15 November 2015 6	Dominion Bilbao Basket	104–111(OT)	Valencia Basket	Bilbao
18:00 (CET)	Scoring by quarter: 23–23, 18–16, 15–18, 29–28, Overtime: 19–26
	Pts: Hannah 22; Rebs: James, Ruoff 6 Asts: Ruoff 5 PIR: Hannah 20	Boxscore	Pts: Hamilton 31; Rebs: Hamilton 10; Asts: Martínez, Vives 4 PIR: Hamilton 39	Arena: Bilbao Arena; Attendance: 9,183; Referees: Conde, Sánchez Monserrat, Serrano

22 November 2015 7	Baloncesto Sevilla	71–81	Dominion Bilbao Basket	Sevilla
12:30 (CET)	Scoring by quarter: 15–31, 26–16, 18–15, 12–19
	Pts: Rodríguez 16; Rebs: Balvin, Oriola 8 Asts: Anderson, Rodríguez 2 PIR: Oriola 14	Boxscore	Pts: Bertāns, Mumbrú 15; Rebs: James 10; Asts: Mumbrú 6 PIR: James 24	Arena: Palacio San Pablo; Attendance: 4,203; Referees: Bultó, Guirao, Munar

25 November 2015 8	Dominion Bilbao Basket	92–99	Real Madrid	Bilbao
19:00 (CET)	Scoring by quarter: 23–17, 23–31, 19–17, 27–34
	Pts: Bertāns 21; Rebs: four players 4 Asts: López 7 PIR: Bertāns 20		Pts: Carroll 19; Rebs: Dončić 6 Asts: Dončić 4 PIR: Ayón, Dončić 22	Arena: Bilbao Arena; Attendance: 10,004; Referees: Pérez Pizarro, Araña, Mas Cagide

5 December 2015 9	Montakit Fuenlabrada	79–75	Dominion Bilbao Basket	Fuenlabrada
19:30 (CET)	Scoring by quarter: 27–19, 15–20, 18–10, 19–26
	Pts: Popović 19; Rebs: Paunić 6 Asts: Úriz 4 PIR: Paunić 25	Boxscore	Pts: Hannah, Mumbrú 15; Rebs: Bogris 12; Asts: Hannah 4 PIR: Hannah 22	Arena: Fernando Martin; Attendance: 5,372; Referees: Cortés, Peruga, Sanchez Mohedas

13 December 2015 10	Dominion Bilbao Basket	89–83(OT)	Laboral Kutxa Baskonia	Bilbao
13:00 (CET)	Scoring by quarter: 18–17, 19–21, 15–19, 18–13, Overtime: 19–13
	Pts: three players 21; Rebs: Bogris 9 Asts: Bertāns 4 PIR: Bertāns 25	Boxscore	Pts: Hanga 16; Rebs: Hanga 11; Asts: Hanga 3 PIR: Hanga 18	Arena: Bilbao Arena; Attendance: 9,837; Referees: Hierrezuelo, Calatrava, Aliaga

20 December 2015 11	Dominion Bilbao Basket	85–91	Movistar Estudiantes	Bilbao
12:00 (CET)	Scoring by quarter: 19–16, 23–24, 24–18, 19–33
	Pts: Hervelle, Mumbrú 15; Rebs: Bogris 8 Asts: Hannah 8 PIR: Hannah 17	Boxscore	Pts: Fernández 26; Rebs: Hernangómez 9 Asts: Salgado 5 PIR: Fernández 27	Arena: Bilbao Arena; Attendance: 8,433; Referees: García González, Martínez, Rial

23 December 2015 12	FC Barcelona Lassa	66–57	Dominion Bilbao Basket	Barcelona
20:45 (CET)	Scoring by quarter: 18–14, 11–20, 23–15, 14–8
	Pts: Ribas 17; Rebs: Tomić 12; Asts: Navarro 5 PIR: Doellman 21	Boxscore	Pts: Bertāns 19; Rebs: Bogris, Hervelle 6 Asts: Bertāns, López 3 PIR: Bertāns 15	Arena: Palau Blaugrana; Attendance: 4,680; Referees: Martín Bertrán, Sánchez Montserrat, Martín

27 December 2015 13	Dominion Bilbao Basket	85–77	FIATC Joventut	Bilbao
13:00 (CET)	Scoring by quarter: 18–12, 26–19, 21–24, 20–22
	Pts: Mumbrú 21; Rebs: Todorović 8 Asts: López 4 PIR: Mumbrú 19	Boxscore	Pts: Mallet 14; Rebs: Drame, Llovet 7 Asts: Vidal 5 PIR: Sàbat 16	Arena: Bilbao Arena; Attendance: 9,098; Referees: Pérez Pérez, Pérez Niz, Fernández

3 January 2016 14	Dominion Bilbao Basket	64–67	Iberostar Tenerife	Bilbao
12:00 (CET)	Scoring by quarter: 17–10, 18–19, 20–17, 9–21
	Pts: Hannah 16; Rebs: Bogris 9 Asts: Bertāns 5 PIR: Hannah 19	Boxscore	Pts: White 16; Rebs: Beirán 9 Asts: White 3 PIR: Beirán 21	Arena: Bilbao Arena; Attendance: 8,946; Referees: Cortés, Guirao, Serrano

10 January 2016 15	CAI Zaragoza	69–71	Dominion Bilbao Basket	Zaragoza
13:00 (CET)	Scoring by quarter: 15–22, 17–20, 19–9, 18–20
	Pts: Sastre 19; Rebs: Kravtsov 8 Asts: Bellas 5 PIR: Sastre 19	Boxscore	Pts: Hannah 20; Rebs: Begić, Mumbrú 7 Asts: Hannah 6 PIR: Hannah 27	Arena: Pabellón José Luis Abós; Attendance: 7,785; Referees: Hierrezuelo, Castillo, Rial

17 January 2016 16	ICL Manresa	67–72	Dominion Bilbao Basket	Manresa
19:00 (CET)	Scoring by quarter: 15–19, 26–17, 10–18, 16–18
	Pts: Musli 20; Rebs: Musli 10; Asts: Hernández 4 PIR: Musli 20	Boxscore	Pts: Bertāns 18; Rebs: Mumbrú 9 Asts: Hannah 4 PIR: Hannah 20	Arena: Nou Congost; Attendance: 3,900; Referees: Conde, Manuel, Aliaga

24 January 2016 17	Dominion Bilbao Basket	88–83	Rio Natura Monbus Obradoiro	Bilbao
12:30 (CET)	Scoring by quarter: 27–23, 26–12, 16–21, 19–27
	Pts: Mumbrú 24; Rebs: Bogris 7 Asts: López, Mumbrú 4 PIR: Mumbrú 30	Boxscore	Pts: McGrath 20; Rebs: Bendžius 7 Asts: McGrath 5 PIR: McGrath 29	Arena: Bilbao Arena; Attendance: 9,432; Referees: Arteaga, García Ortiz, Zamorano

31 January 2016 18	Valencia Basket	85–49	Dominion Bilbao Basket	Valencia
19:30 (CET)	Scoring by quarter: 26–10, 17–8, 23–18, 19–13
	Pts: Vives 17; Rebs: Hamilton 6 Asts: Diot 3 PIR: Vives 22	Boxscore	Pts: Hannah 12; Rebs: Bogris 7 Asts: Hannah 4 PIR: Bogris 16	Arena: Fuente de San Luis; Attendance: 8,500; Referees: Pérez Pérez, Guirao, Martínez Díez

7 February 2016 19	Dominion Bilbao Basket	90–79	UCAM Murcia	Bilbao
12:30 (CET)	Scoring by quarter: 28–14, 21–25, 19–17, 22–23
	Pts: Mumbrú 17; Rebs: Bogris 8 Asts: three players 4 PIR: Mumbrú 28	Boxscore	Pts: Wood 19; Rebs: Faverani, Radović 8 Asts: Cabezas 5 PIR: Faverani 20	Arena: Bilbao Arena; Attendance: 9,142; Referees: Peruga, Bultó, Mas

14 February 2016 20	Herbalife Gran Canaria	91–85	Dominion Bilbao Basket	Las Palmas
19:30 (CET)	Scoring by quarter: 27–26, 22–21, 20–20, 22–18
	Pts: Omić 20; Rebs: Aguilar 6 Asts: Oliver 5 PIR: Omić 20	Boxscore	Pts: Hannah 23; Rebs: Bogris 8 Asts: Hannah 7 PIR: Hannah 29	Arena: Gran Canaria Arena; Attendance: 6,043; Referees: Perea, Oyón, Planells

28 February 2016 21	Dominion Bilbao Basket	vs.	MoraBanc Andorra	Bilbao
12:30 (CET)
		Boxscore		Arena: Bilbao Arena

6 March 2016 22	Laboral Kutxa Baskonia	vs.	Dominion Bilbao Basket	Vitoria-Gasteiz
19:30 (CET)
		Boxscore		Arena: Fernando Buesa Arena

13 March 2016 23	Movistar Estudiantes	vs.	Dominion Bilbao Basket	Madrid
19:30 (CET)
		Boxscore		Arena: Barclaycard Center

19 March 2016 24	Dominion Bilbao Basket	vs.	RETAbet.es GBC	Bilbao
20:45 (CET)
		Boxscore		Arena: Bilbao Arena

27 March 2016 25	Unicaja	vs.	Dominion Bilbao Basket	Málaga
19:30 (CEST)
		Boxscore		Arena: Martín Carpena

3 April 2016 26	Dominion Bilbao Basket	vs.	Montakit Fuenlabrada	Bilbao
12:30 (CEST)
		Boxscore		Arena: Bilbao Arena

==== Results overview ====
Win Draw Loss

Opposition	Home score	Away score	Double
Baloncesto Sevilla		71–81	
CAI Zaragoza		69–71	
FC Barcelona Lassa		66–57	
FIATC Joventut	85–77		
Herbalife Gran Canaria	59–85	91–85	144–176
Iberostar Tenerife	64–67		
ICL Manresa		67–72	
Laboral Kutxa Baskonia	89–83		
Montakit Fuenlabrada		79–75	
MoraBanc Andorra		69–79	
Movistar Estudiantes	85–91		
Real Madrid	92–99		
RETAbet.es GBC		63–75	
Rio Natura Monbus Obradoiro	88–83		
UCAM Murcia	90–79	96–68	158–175
Unicaja	88–70		
Valencia Basket	104–111	85–49	153–196

=== Eurocup ===
==== Regular season ====
Pos	Team	Pld	W	L	PF	PA	PD	Qualification
1	(Spain) Dominion Bilbao Basket	10	8	2	856	729	+127	Advance to Last 32
2	(Italy) Dolomiti Energia Trento	10	7	3	875	827	+48	Advance to Last 32
3	(Slovenia) Union Olimpija	10	5	5	799	828	−29	Advance to Last 32
4	(Germany) EWE Baskets Oldenburg	10	4	6	764	820	−56	Advance to Last 32
5	(France) JSF Nanterre	10	4	6	772	801	−29	
6	(Germany) Telekom Baskets Bonn	10	2	8	838	899	−61	

Source: Eurocup Basketball

Win Loss

14 October 2015 1	Dominion Bilbao Basket (Spain)	73–76	(France) JSF Nanterre	Bilbao, Spain
20:30 (CEST)	Scoring by quarter: 19–17, 7–19, 22–12, 25–28
	Pts: Bertāns 22; Rebs: Hervelle 6 Asts: Hervelle 4 PIR: James, Bertāns 23	Boxscore	Pts: Campbell 21; Rebs: Jaiteh 14; Asts: Campbell 3 PIR: Jaiteh 19	Arena: Bilbao Arena; Attendance: 5,104 (Tentative); Referees: Petros Papapetrou (GRE), Sergio Silva (POR), Clemens Fritz (GER)

20 October 2015 2	Telekom Baskets Bonn (Germany)	81–90	(Spain) Dominion Bilbao Basket	Bonn, Germany
19:30 (CEST)	Scoring by quarter: 15–31, 18–18, 22–17, 26–24
	Pts: White 15; Rebs: Mädrich, Mangold 5 Asts: Lawrence 10; PIR: White 18	Boxscore	Pts: Bertāns 15; Rebs: James 8 Asts: Ruoff, Hannah 3 PIR: James 15	Arena: Telekom Dome; Attendance: 3,250 (Tentative); Referees: Joseph Bissang (FRA), Marius Ciulin (ROU), Alexey Davydov (RUS)

27 October 2015 3	EWE Baskets (Germany)	60–94	(Spain) Dominion Bilbao Basket	Oldenburg, Germany
20:00 (CET)	Scoring by quarter: 16–27, 13–18, 19–26, 12–23
	Pts: Smeulders 14; Rebs: Smeulders 7 Asts: Prepelič 3 PIR: Smeulders 23	Boxscore	Pts: Bertāns 17; Rebs: James, Suárez 5 Asts: Hannah 7 PIR: James 19	Arena: EWE Arena; Attendance: 2,449 (Tentative); Referees: Aare Halliko (EST), Aleksandar Glisic (SRB), Ilya Putenko (RUS)

4 November 2015 4	Dominion Bilbao Basket (Spain)	80–83	(Slovenia) Union Olimpija	Bilbao, Spain
20:30 (CET)	Scoring by quarter: 22–18, 19–27, 18–16, 21–22
	Pts: Mumbrú 15; Rebs: James, Hervelle 8 Asts: four players 2 PIR: James 20	Boxscore	Pts: Wright 18; Rebs: Wright 10; Asts: Wright 5 PIR: Wright 36	Arena: Bilbao Arena; Attendance: 5,470 (Tentative); Referees: Fernando Rocha (POR), Olegs Latisevs (LAT), Saverio Lanzarini (ITA)

11 November 2015 5	Dolomiti Energia Trento (Italy)	75–80	(Spain) Dominion Bilbao Basket	Trento, Italy
20:30 (CET)	Scoring by quarter: 21–19, 15–27, 16–18, 23–16
	Pts: Sanders 14; Rebs: Wright 10; Asts: Wright 5 PIR: Pascolo 15	Boxscore	Pts: Hannah 22; Rebs: Hervelle 7 Asts: Hannah 4 PIR: Hannah 20	Arena: PalaTrento; Attendance: 1,715; Referees: Boris Shulga (UKR), Petar Obradović (BIH), Luis Lopes (POR)

17 November 2015 6	JSF Nanterre (France)	52–83	(Spain) Dominion Bilbao Basket	Nanterre, France
20:30 (CET)	Scoring by quarter: 9–20, 20–24, 13–21, 10–18
	Pts: Jaiteh 12; Rebs: Riley 6 Asts: Riley 2 PIR: Jaiteh 14	Boxscore	Pts: Hannah 20; Rebs: Bogris 9 Asts: Hannah, Mumbrú 3 PIR: Hannah 26	Arena: Palais des Sports Maurice Thorez; Attendance: 1,700; Referees: Petros Papapetrou (GRE), Amit Balak (ISR), Mario Majkić (SLO)

25 November 2015 7	Dominion Bilbao Basket (Spain)	95–80	(Germany) Telekom Baskets Bonn	Bilbao, Spain
20:15 (CET)	Scoring by quarter: 19–17, 27–17, 23–23, 26–23
	Pts: Hannah 23; Rebs: Mumbrú 6 Asts: López 5 PIR: Hannah 23	Boxscore	Pts: Lawrence 16; Rebs: Klimavicius, White 6 Asts: Lawrence 10; PIR: Lawrence 24	Arena: Bilbao Arena; Attendance: 4,751; Referees: Jurgis Laurinavičius (LTU), Uroš Obrknežević (SRB), Josip Radojković (CRO)

2 December 2015 8	Dominion Bilbao Basket (Spain)	73–68	(Germany) EWE Baskets	Bilbao, Spain
19:15 (CET)	Scoring by quarter: 20–23, 17–17, 27–11, 9–17
	Pts: Bertāns 15; Rebs: Bogris 14; Asts: Hannah 4 PIR: Bogris 22	Boxscore	Pts: Duggins 18; Rebs: Qvale 8 Asts: Kramer 3 PIR: Duggins 22	Arena: Bilbao Arena; Attendance: 4,350; Referees: Srđan Dozai (CRO), Erşan Kartal (TUR), Oskars Lucis (LAT)

9 December 2015 9	Union Olimpija (Slovenia)	63–84	(Spain) Dominion Bilbao Basket	Ljubljana, Slovenia
20:30 (CET)	Scoring by quarter: 21–19, 16–29, 15–14, 11–22
	Pts: Rupnik 11; Rebs: Wright 6 Asts: Wright 3 PIR: Wright 14	Boxscore	Pts: Bertāns 26; Rebs: Suárez 5 Asts: Bogris 4 PIR: Bertāns 31	Arena: Arena Stožice; Attendance: 4,800; Referees: Renaud Geller (BEL), Nicola Maestre (FRA), Murat Biricik (TUR)

16 December 2015 10	Dominion Bilbao Basket (Spain)	104–91	(Italy) Dolomiti Energia Trento	Bilbao, Spain
20:15 (CET)	Scoring by quarter: 34–22, 24–14, 24–27, 22–28
	Pts: Hannah 22; Rebs: three players 4 Asts: Hannah 8 PIR: Hannah 28	Boxscore	Pts: Sutton 20; Rebs: three players 4 Asts: Poeta 7 PIR: Sutton 18	Arena: Bilbao Arena; Attendance: 4,165; Referees: Fernando Rocha (POR), Tomislav Hordov (CRO), Saša Maričić (SRB)

==== Last 32 ====
Pos	Team	Pld	W	L	PF	PA	PD	Qualification
1	(Germany) Bayern Munich	6	4	2	476	454	+22	Advance to Eighthfinals
2	(Turkey) Banvit	6	4	2	487	455	+32	Advance to Eighthfinals
3	(Spain) Dominion Bilbao Basket	6	3	3	483	464	+19	
4	(Germany) ratiopharm Ulm	6	1	5	435	508	−73	

Source: Eurocup Basketball

Win Loss

6 January 2016 1	ratiopharm Ulm (Germany)	75–93	(Spain) Dominion Bilbao Basket	Ulm, Germany
17:00 (CET)	Scoring by quarter: 18–25, 23–19, 12–27, 22–22
	Pts: Braun 11; Rebs: Babb 5 Asts: Braun 5 PIR: Braun 15	Boxscore	Pts: Hannah 20; Rebs: Mumbrú 5 Asts: Bertāns 5 PIR: Ruoff	Arena: ratiopharm Arena; Attendance: 4,500; Referees: Eddie Viator (FRA), Luís Lopes (POR), Josip Radojković (CRO)

13 January 2016 2	Dominion Bilbao Basket (Spain)	76–85	(Turkey) Banvit	Bilbao, Spain
20:30 (CET)	Scoring by quarter: 16–19, 28–17, 17–17, 15–32
	Pts: Bertāns 15; Rebs: Bogris 8 Asts: three players 2 PIR: Bogris 16	Boxscore	Pts: Moerman 25; Rebs: Simmons 5 Asts: Fortson 6 PIR: Moerman 30	Arena: Bilbao Arena; Attendance: 4,070; Referees: Srđan Dozai (CRO), Anastasios Piloidis (GRE), Semen Ovinov (RUS)

20 January 2016 3	Dominion Bilbao Basket (Spain)	76–78	(Germany) Bayern Munich	Bilbao, Spain
20:45 (CET)	Scoring by quarter: 25–18, 15–23, 23–20, 13–17
	Pts: Bertāns 27; Rebs: Mumbrú, Ruoff 6 Asts: Hannah, López 5 PIR: Bertāns 28	Boxscore	Pts: Renfroe 16; Rebs: Renfroe, Taylor 8 Asts: Gavel 3 PIR: Renfroe 18	Arena: Bilbao Arena; Attendance: 5,780; Referees: Joseph Bissang (FRA), Siniša Herceg (CRO), Amit Balak (ISR)

27 January 2016 4	Bayern Munich (Germany)	88–90	(Spain) Dominion Bilbao Basket	Munich, Germany
20:00 (CET)	Scoring by quarter: 21–17, 20–23, 15–24, 32–26
	Pts: Renfroe 23; Rebs: Zipser 6 Asts: Cobbs, Gavel 4 PIR: Zipser 28	Boxscore	Pts: Bertāns 24; Rebs: Bogris 10; Asts: Mumbrú 4 PIR: Bertāns 30	Arena: Audi Dome; Attendance: 4,906; Referees: Elias Koromilas (GRE), Seffi Shemmesh (ISR), Erşan Kartal (TUR)

3 February 2016 5	Dominion Bilbao Basket (Spain)	83–65	(Germany) ratiopharm Ulm	Bilbao, Spain
20:30 (CET)	Scoring by quarter: 16–11, 27–18, 15–20, 25–16
	Pts: Bertāns 18; Rebs: Bogris 12; Asts: Hannah 6 PIR: Bertāns, Bogris 21	Boxscore	Pts: Henry 10; Rebs: Neumann 8 Asts: three players 2 PIR: Neumann	Arena: Bilbao Arena; Attendance: 4,673; Referees: Tolga Sahin (ITA), Haris Bijedić (BIH), Markos Michaelides (SUI)

10 February 2016 6	Banvit (Turkey)	73–65	(Spain) Dominion Bilbao Basket	Bandırma, Turkey
18:00 (CET)	Scoring by quarter: 19–14, 15–13, 16–25, 23–13
	Pts: Fortson 24; Rebs: Moerman 15; Asts: Fortson 3 PIR: Fortson 23	Boxscore	Pts: Hannah 14; Rebs: Bogris 10; Asts: Bogris, Hannah 4 PIR: Bogris 20	Arena: Banvit Kara Ali Acar Sport Hall; Attendance: 2,850; Referees: Robert Vyklický (CZE), Sergey Zashchuk (UKR), Sérgio Silva (POR)

=== Copa del Rey ===
Win Loss

18 February 2016 Quarterfinals	FC Barcelona Lassa	72–73	Dominion Bilbao Basket	A Coruña
19:00 (CET)	Scoring by quarter: 18–20, 19–20, 18–15, 17–18
	Pts: Oleson 14; Rebs: Doellman 8 Asts: Satoranský 3 PIR: Doellman 14	Boxscore	Pts: Ruoff 18; Rebs: three players 4 Asts: Bertāns, Hervelle 4 PIR: Ruoff 21	Arena: Coliseum; Attendance: 9,156; Referees: Hierrezuelo, Calatrava, Sacristán

20 February 2016 Semifinals	Dominion Bilbao Basket	71–81	Herbalife Gran Canaria	A Coruña
19:00 (CET)	Scoring by quarter: 22–15, 24–19, 9–14, 16–33
	Pts: Hannah 20; Rebs: Bogris 6 Asts: Bogris 3 PIR: Hannah 18	Boxscore	Pts: Oliver 18; Rebs: Báez 8 Asts: Oliver 4 PIR: Oliver 18	Arena: Coliseum; Attendance: 10,000; Referees: Conde, Jiménez, Calatrava

== Statistics ==
Legend
GP	Games played	GS	Games started	MPG	Minutes per game
FG%	Field-goal percentage	3FG%	3-point field-goal percentage	FT%	Free-throw percentage
RPG	Rebounds per game	APG	Assists per game	SPG	Steals per game
BPG	Blocks per game	PPG	Points per game	PIR	PIR per game

=== Liga ACB ===
Player	GP	GS	MPG	FG%	3FG%	FT%	RPG	APG	SPG	BPG	PPG	EFF
Seydou Aboubacar	0	0	0.0	.000	.000	.000	0.0	0.0	0.0	0.0	0.0	0.0
Mirza Begić	0	0	0.0	.000	.000	.000	0.0	0.0	0.0	0.0	0.0	0.0
Dairis Bertāns	0	0	0.0	.000	.000	.000	0.0	0.0	0.0	0.0	0.0	0.0
Georgios Bogris	0	0	0.0	.000	.000	.000	0.0	0.0	0.0	0.0	0.0	0.0
Tobias Borg	0	0	0.0	.000	.000	.000	0.0	0.0	0.0	0.0	0.0	0.0
Etinosa Erevbenagie	0	0	0.0	.000	.000	.000	0.0	0.0	0.0	0.0	0.0	0.0
Clevin Hannah	0	0	0.0	.000	.000	.000	0.0	0.0	0.0	0.0	0.0	0.0
Axel Hervelle	0	0	0.0	.000	.000	.000	0.0	0.0	0.0	0.0	0.0	0.0
Shawn James	0	0	0.0	.000	.000	.000	0.0	0.0	0.0	0.0	0.0	0.0
Raül López	0	0	0.0	.000	.000	.000	0.0	0.0	0.0	0.0	0.0	0.0
Borja Mendía	0	0	0.0	.000	.000	.000	0.0	0.0	0.0	0.0	0.0	0.0
Álex Mumbrú	0	0	0.0	.000	.000	.000	0.0	0.0	0.0	0.0	0.0	0.0
Alex Ruoff	0	0	0.0	.000	.000	.000	0.0	0.0	0.0	0.0	0.0	0.0
Tautvydas Šležas	0	0	0.0	.000	.000	.000	0.0	0.0	0.0	0.0	0.0	0.0
Álex Suárez	0	0	0.0	.000	.000	.000	0.0	0.0	0.0	0.0	0.0	0.0
Dejan Todorović	0	0	0.0	.000	.000	.000	0.0	0.0	0.0	0.0	0.0	0.0

=== Copa del Rey ===
Player	GP	GS	MPG	FG%	3FG%	FT%	RPG	APG	SPG	BPG	PPG	EFF
Dairis Bertāns	0	0	0.0	.000	.000	.000	0.0	0.0	0.0	0.0	0.0	0.0
Georgios Bogris	0	0	0.0	.000	.000	.000	0.0	0.0	0.0	0.0	0.0	0.0
Tobias Borg	0	0	0.0	.000	.000	.000	0.0	0.0	0.0	0.0	0.0	0.0
Clevin Hannah	0	0	0.0	.000	.000	.000	0.0	0.0	0.0	0.0	0.0	0.0
Axel Hervelle	0	0	0.0	.000	.000	.000	0.0	0.0	0.0	0.0	0.0	0.0
Raül López	0	0	0.0	.000	.000	.000	0.0	0.0	0.0	0.0	0.0	0.0
Borja Mendía	0	0	0.0	.000	.000	.000	0.0	0.0	0.0	0.0	0.0	0.0
Álex Mumbrú	0	0	0.0	.000	.000	.000	0.0	0.0	0.0	0.0	0.0	0.0
Alex Ruoff	0	0	0.0	.000	.000	.000	0.0	0.0	0.0	0.0	0.0	0.0
Tautvydas Šležas	0	0	0.0	.000	.000	.000	0.0	0.0	0.0	0.0	0.0	0.0
Álex Suárez	0	0	0.0	.000	.000	.000	0.0	0.0	0.0	0.0	0.0	0.0
Dejan Todorović	0	0	0.0	.000	.000	.000	0.0	0.0	0.0	0.0	0.0	0.0

=== Eurocup ===
Player	GP	GS	MPG	FG%	3FG%	FT%	RPG	APG	SPG	BPG	PPG	EFF
Seydou Aboubacar	0	0	0.0	.000	.000	.000	0.0	0.0	0.0	0.0	0.0	0.0
Mirza Begić	0	0	0.0	.000	.000	.000	0.0	0.0	0.0	0.0	0.0	0.0
Dairis Bertāns	0	0	0.0	.000	.000	.000	0.0	0.0	0.0	0.0	0.0	0.0
Georgios Bogris	0	0	0.0	.000	.000	.000	0.0	0.0	0.0	0.0	0.0	0.0
Tobias Borg	0	0	0.0	.000	.000	.000	0.0	0.0	0.0	0.0	0.0	0.0
Etinosa Erevbenagie	0	0	0.0	.000	.000	.000	0.0	0.0	0.0	0.0	0.0	0.0
Clevin Hannah	0	0	0.0	.000	.000	.000	0.0	0.0	0.0	0.0	0.0	0.0
Axel Hervelle	0	0	0.0	.000	.000	.000	0.0	0.0	0.0	0.0	0.0	0.0
Shawn James	0	0	0.0	.000	.000	.000	0.0	0.0	0.0	0.0	0.0	0.0
Raül López	0	0	0.0	.000	.000	.000	0.0	0.0	0.0	0.0	0.0	0.0
Borja Mendía	0	0	0.0	.000	.000	.000	0.0	0.0	0.0	0.0	0.0	0.0
Álex Mumbrú	0	0	0.0	.000	.000	.000	0.0	0.0	0.0	0.0	0.0	0.0
Alex Ruoff	0	0	0.0	.000	.000	.000	0.0	0.0	0.0	0.0	0.0	0.0
Tautvydas Šležas	0	0	0.0	.000	.000	.000	0.0	0.0	0.0	0.0	0.0	0.0
Álex Suárez	0	0	0.0	.000	.000	.000	0.0	0.0	0.0	0.0	0.0	0.0
Dejan Todorović	0	0	0.0	.000	.000	.000	0.0	0.0	0.0	0.0	0.0	0.0
