= 2016 Copa del Rey de Baloncesto =

Spanish Sports

Tournament details
- Arena: Coliseum da Coruña; A Coruña
- Dates: 18–21 February 2016

Final positions
- Champions: Real Madrid (26th title)
- Runners-up: Herbalife Gran Canaria

Awards and statistics
- MVP: (Mexico) Gustavo Ayón

The 2016 Copa del Rey de Baloncesto was the 80th edition of the Spanish King's Basketball Cup. It was managed by the ACB and was held in A Coruña, in the Coliseum on February 18–21, 2016. Real Madrid won their 26th cup.

== Qualified teams ==
The seven first qualified after the first half of the 2015–16 ACB regular season qualified to the tournament. As Rio Natura Monbus Obradoiro, host team, not finished between the seven first teams, the eighth qualified did not enter in the Copa del Rey.

Pos	Team	Pld	W	L	PF	PA	PD	Seeding
1	Valencia Basket	17	17	0	1443	1250	+193	Seeded teams
2	FC Barcelona Lassa	17	15	2	1426	1202	+224	Seeded teams
3	Laboral Kutxa Baskonia	17	14	3	1474	1292	+182	Seeded teams
4	Real Madrid	17	13	4	1545	1344	+201	Seeded teams
5	Herbalife Gran Canaria	17	10	7	1356	1261	+95	
6	Dominion Bilbao Basket	17	9	8	1332	1346	−14	
7	Montakit Fuenlabrada	17	9	8	1347	1378	−31	
14	Rio Natura Monbus Obradoiro (H)	17	6	11	1306	1334	−28	

Source: ACB
(H) Hosts

== Draw ==
The draw of the 2016 Copa del Rey de Baloncesto was on 25 January 2016 at approximately 12:00 local time (CET) and was live on YouTube and broadcast live on TV in many countries. The seeded teams were paired in the quarterfinals with the non-seeded teams. There are not any restrictions for the draw of the semifinals. As in recent seasons, the first qualified team play its quarterfinal game on Thursday.

== Bracket ==
Quarterfinals
18 February
FC Barcelona Lassa	72
Dominion Bilbao Basket	73
18 February
Valencia Basket	78
Herbalife Gran Canaria	83
19 February
Rio Natura Monbus Obradoiro	77
Laboral Kutxa Baskonia	79
19 February
Real Madrid	101
Montakit Fuenlabrada	84

Semifinals
20 February
Dominion Bilbao Basket	71
Herbalife Gran Canaria	81
20 February
Laboral Kutxa Baskonia	80
Real Madrid	86

Final
21 February
Herbalife Gran Canaria	81
Real Madrid	85

== Quarterfinals ==
=== FC Barcelona Lassa vs. Dominion Bilbao Basket ===
18 February 2016	FC Barcelona Lassa	72–73	Dominion Bilbao Basket	A Coruña
19:00 (CET)	Scoring by quarter: 18–20, 19–20, 18–15, 17–18
	Pts: Oleson 14; Rebs: Doellman 8 Asts: Satoranský 3 PIR: Doellman 14	Boxscore	Pts: Ruoff 18; Rebs: three players 4 Asts: Bertāns, Hervelle 4 PIR: Ruoff 21	Arena: Coliseum; Attendance: 9,156; Referees: Hierrezuelo, Calatrava, Sacristán

Starters:			Pts	Reb	Ast
PG	13	(Czech Republic) Tomáš Satoranský	5	0	3
SG	11	(Spain) Juan Carlos Navarro	6	1	0
SF	33	(Greece) Stratos Perperoglou	6	3	1
PF	5	(United States) Justin Doellman	11	8	2
C	44	(Croatia) Ante Tomić	8	4	0
Reserves:					
SG	8	(Spain) Pau Ribas	9	3	1
SF	10	(Spain) Álex Abrines	2	0	0
PF	14	(Bulgaria) Aleksandar Vezenkov	2	4	0
C	21	(Senegal) Moussa Diagne	DNP		
C	23	(Jamaica) Samardo Samuels	5	3	2
SG	24	(United States) Brad Oleson	14	1	2
PG	30	(Puerto Rico) Carlos Arroyo	4	0	0
Head coach:
(Spanish Basketball Federation) Xavi Pascual

FC Barcelona Lassa	Dominion Bilbao Basket

Starters:			Pts	Reb	Ast
PG	11	(United States) Clevin Hannah	6	1	2
SG	9	(Latvia) Dairis Bertāns	3	4	4
SF	15	(Spain) Álex Mumbrú	12	4	1
PF	17	(Belgium) Axel Hervelle	15	2	4
C	13	(Greece) Georgios Bogris	8	3	1
Reserves:					
C	5	(Lithuania) Tautvydas Šležas	0	0	0
SF	7	(United States) Alex Ruoff	18	4	2
SG	8	(Sweden) Tobias Borg	DNP		
SF	10	(Spain) Borja Mendía	0	0	0
SF	20	(Serbia) Dejan Todorović	5	2	0
PG	31	(Spain) Raül López	3	1	1
PF	33	(Spain) Álex Suárez	3	1	0
Head coach:
(Spanish Basketball Federation) Sito Alonso

=== Valencia Basket vs. Herbalife Gran Canaria ===
18 February 2016	Valencia Basket	78–83	Herbalife Gran Canaria	A Coruña
21:30 (CET)	Scoring by quarter: 26–16, 16–26, 23–15, 13–25
	Pts: San Emeterio 17; Rebs: Hamilton 10; Asts: Hamilton, Vives 3 PIR: San Emeterio 17	Boxscore	Pts: Aguilar 16; Rebs: Omić 9 Asts: Pangos 8 PIR: Aguilar 18	Arena: Coliseum; Attendance: 9,156; Referees: García González, Pérez Pérez, Cortés

Starters:			Pts	Reb	Ast
PG	16	(Spain) Guillem Vives	8	1	3
SG	17	(Spain) Rafa Martínez	9	4	0
SF	19	(Spain) Fernando San Emeterio	17	3	1
PF	43	(United States) Luke Sikma	8	3	1
C	41	(United States) Justin Hamilton	6	10	3
Reserves:					
SG	1	(Iceland) Jón Arnór Stefánsson	0	0	0
PF	4	(Spain) Jordi Trias	DNP		
PG	8	(France) Antoine Diot	5	1	2
SF	10	(Central African Republic) Romain Sato	DNP		
SF	13	(Serbia) Vladimir Lučić	6	3	0
C	14	(Montenegro) Bojan Dubljević	14	6	2
PF	24	(United States) John Shurna	5	1	0
Head coach:
(Spanish Basketball Federation) Pedro Martínez

Valencia Basket	Herbalife Gran Canaria

Starters:			Pts	Reb	Ast
PG	4	(Spain) Albert Oliver	5	0	5
SG	9	(Finland) Sasu Salin	4	0	0
SF	8	(Australia) Brad Newley	7	2	1
PF	13	(Dominican Republic) Eulis Báez	7	6	0
C	23	(Slovenia) Alen Omić	10	9	0
Reserves:					
PG	3	(Canada) Kevin Pangos	10	2	8
C	7	(Senegal) Sitapha Savané	1	0	0
SG	11	(United States) D. J. Seeley	14	3	0
C	14	(Latvia) Anžejs Pasečņiks	DNP		
SG	21	(Spain) Oriol Paulí	DNP		
SF	22	(Spain) Xavi Rabaseda	9	3	0
PF	34	(Spain) Pablo Aguilar	16	2	0
Head coach:
(Spanish Basketball Federation) Aíto García Reneses

=== Real Madrid vs. Montakit Fuenlabrada ===
19 February 2016	Real Madrid	101–84	Montakit Fuenlabrada	A Coruña
19:00 (CET)	Scoring by quarter: 25–21, 29–13, 23–25, 24–25
	Pts: Carroll 18; Rebs: Ayón 7 Asts: Llull, Rodríguez 6 PIR: Llull 24	Boxscore	Pts: Paunić 27; Rebs: Paunić 7 Asts: Tabu, Úriz 5 PIR: Paunić 34	Arena: Coliseum; Attendance: 9,800; Referees: Pérez Pizarro, Perea, Araña

Starters:			Pts	Reb	Ast
PG	23	(Spain) Sergio Llull	11	3	6
SG	20	(Azerbaijan) Jaycee Carroll	18	1	1
SF	8	(Lithuania) Jonas Mačiulis	15	2	1
PF	9	(Spain) Felipe Reyes	10	6	1
C	14	(Mexico) Gustavo Ayón	12	7	3
Reserves:					
SF	3	(United States) K. C. Rivers	0	2	0
PF	6	(Argentina) Andrés Nocioni	14	5	1
PG	7	(Slovenia) Luka Dončić	3	2	1
PG	13	(Spain) Sergio Rodríguez	2	2	6
C	22	(Brazil) Augusto Lima	2	3	0
C	41	(Spain) Willy Hernangómez	2	0	0
SF	44	(Sweden) Jeffery Taylor	12	2	6
Head coach:
(Spanish Basketball Federation) Pablo Laso

Real Madrid	Montakit Fuenlabrada

Starters:			Pts	Reb	Ast
PG	9	(Belgium) Jonathan Tabu	5	0	5
SG	2	(Croatia) Marko Popović	0	1	3
SF	31	(Serbia) Ivan Paunić	27	7	3
PF	12	(United States) David Wear	2	3	0
C	15	(Spain) Chema González	8	1	0
Reserves:					
SG	3	(Spain) Álex Urtasun	22	1	0
PG	6	(Spain) Ricardo Úriz	2	1	5
C	7	(Serbia) Oliver Stević	9	5	1
SF	11	(Spain) Álex Llorca	3	0	1
SF	13	(Latvia) Rolands Šmits	0	1	0
C	21	(Croatia) Josip Sobin	6	1	0
PF	24	(United States) Ernest Scott	DNP		
Head coach:
(Spanish Basketball Federation) Jota Cuspinera

=== Rio Natura Monbus Obradoiro vs. Laboral Kutxa Baskonia ===
19 February 2016	Rio Natura Monbus Obradoiro	77–79	Laboral Kutxa Baskonia	A Coruña
21:30 (CET)	Scoring by quarter: 12–24, 18–11, 30–23, 17–21
	Pts: Brown 14; Rebs: Brown 6 Asts: McGrath 6 PIR: three players 13	Boxscore	Pts: Hanga 20; Rebs: Bourousis, Hanga 8 Asts: Bourousis 3 PIR: Hanga 31	Arena: Coliseum; Attendance: 10,000; Referees: Martín Bertrán, Conde, Peruga

Starters:			Pts	Reb	Ast
PG	7	(United States) Donnie McGrath	10	3	6
SF	21	(Poland) Adam Waczyński	6	1	2
SF	22	(Lithuania) Eimantas Bendžius	11	5	0
PF	32	(United States) Angelo Caloiaro	2	5	4
C	10	(United States) Alec Brown	14	6	1
Reserves:					
SG	2	(United States) Tyler Haws	11	2	0
C	8	(Spain) Juanjo Triguero	11	2	0
C	13	(Ukraine) Artem Pustovyi	2	1	0
SF	16	(Spain) Santiago Yusta	10	3	0
PG	24	(Spain) Fran Cárdenas	DNP		
PG	44	(Spain) Pepe Pozas	0	2	3
C	45	(Spain) Jesús Chagoyen	0	0	0
Head coach:
(Spanish Basketball Federation) Moncho Fernández

Rio Natura Monbus	Laboral Kutxa Baskonia

Starters:			Pts	Reb	Ast
PG	20	(United States) Darius Adams	14	4	1
SG	5	(France) Fabien Causeur	19	2	2
SF	8	(Hungary) Ádám Hanga	20	8	2
PF	14	(France) Kim Tillie	5	3	1
C	12	(Spain) Ilimane Diop	4	2	0
Reserves:					
PG	3	(United States) Mike James	0	3	1
PF	4	(Spain) Mamadou Diop	DNP		
C	9	(Greece) Ioannis Bourousis	13	8	3
SG	11	(Slovenia) Jaka Blažič	4	1	0
SF	33	(Spain) Alberto Corbacho	DNP		
SF	42	(Latvia) Dāvis Bertāns	0	1	0
Head coach:
(Croatian Basketball Federation) Velimir Perasović

== Semifinals ==
=== Dominion Bilbao Basket vs. Herbalife Gran Canaria ===
20 February 2016	Dominion Bilbao Basket	71–81	Herbalife Gran Canaria	A Coruña
19:00 (CET)	Scoring by quarter: 22–15, 24–19, 9–14, 16–33
	Pts: Hannah 20; Rebs: Bogris 6 Asts: Bogris 3 PIR: Hannah 18	Boxscore	Pts: Oliver 18; Rebs: Báez 8 Asts: Oliver 4 PIR: Oliver 18	Arena: Coliseum; Attendance: 10,000; Referees: Conde, Jiménez, Calatrava

Starters:			Pts	Reb	Ast
PG	11	(United States) Clevin Hannah	20	0	2
SG	9	(Latvia) Dairis Bertāns	13	4	1
SF	15	(Spain) Álex Mumbrú	17	1	0
PF	17	(Belgium) Axel Hervelle	6	3	0
C	13	(Greece) Georgios Bogris	8	6	3
Reserves:					
C	5	(Lithuania) Tautvydas Šležas	0	3	0
SF	7	(United States) Alex Ruoff	0	4	1
SG	8	(Sweden) Tobias Borg	DNP		
SF	10	(Spain) Borja Mendía	0	0	0
SF	20	(Serbia) Dejan Todorović	2	1	1
PG	31	(Spain) Raül López	5	0	1
PF	33	(Spain) Álex Suárez	0	1	0
Head coach:
(Spanish Basketball Federation) Sito Alonso

Dominion Bilbao Basket	Herbalife Gran Canaria

Starters:			Pts	Reb	Ast
PG	4	(Spain) Albert Oliver	18	3	4
SG	9	(Finland) Sasu Salin	12	2	2
SF	8	(United States) Brad Newley	4	1	0
PF	13	(Dominican Republic) Eulis Báez	10	8	0
C	23	(Slovenia) Alen Omić	9	5	0
Reserves:					
PG	3	(Canada) Kevin Pangos	9	3	1
C	7	(Senegal) Sitapha Savané	1	1	0
SG	11	(United States) D. J. Seeley	6	0	0
C	14	(Latvia) Anžejs Pasečņiks	DNP		
SG	21	(Spain) Oriol Paulí	0	0	0
SF	22	(Spain) Xavi Rabaseda	4	4	1
PF	34	(Spain) Pablo Aguilar	8	5	0
Head coach:
(Spanish Basketball Federation) Aíto García Reneses

=== Laboral Kutxa Baskonia vs. Real Madrid ===
20 February 2016	Laboral Kutxa Baskonia	80–86	Real Madrid	A Coruña
21:30 (CET)	Scoring by quarter: 17–25, 27–15, 17–20, 19–26
	Pts: Bourousis 16; Rebs: Bourousis 13; Asts: Adams, Hanga 3 PIR: Bourousis 20	Boxscore	Pts: Llull 15; Rebs: Reyes 9 Asts: Rodríguez 6 PIR: Ayón 18	Arena: Coliseum; Attendance: 10,000; Referees: Pérez Pizarro, Pérez Pérez, Peruga

Starters:			Pts	Reb	Ast
PG	20	(United States) Darius Adams	15	3	3
SG	5	(France) Fabien Causeur	14	3	2
SF	8	(Hungary) Ádám Hanga	12	3	3
PF	14	(France) Kim Tillie	8	2	0
C	12	(Spain) Ilimane Diop	3	2	0
Reserves:					
PG	3	(United States) Mike James	6	3	2
PF	4	(Spain) Mamadou Diop	DNP		
C	9	(Greece) Ioannis Bourousis	16	13	2
SG	11	(Slovenia) Jaka Blažič	5	2	0
SF	33	(Spain) Alberto Corbacho	DNP		
SF	42	(Latvia) Dāvis Bertāns	1	0	0
Head coach:
(Croatian Basketball Federation) Velimir Perasović

Laboral Kutxa Baskonia	Real Madrid

Starters:			Pts	Reb	Ast
PG	23	(Spain) Sergio Llull	15	2	4
SG	20	(Azerbaijan) Jaycee Carroll	8	3	1
SF	8	(Lithuania) Jonas Mačiulis	8	5	1
PF	9	(Spain) Felipe Reyes	8	9	2
C	14	(Mexico) Gustavo Ayón	14	6	1
Reserves:					
SF	3	(United States) K. C. Rivers	5	0	0
PF	6	(Argentina) Andrés Nocioni	11	2	1
PG	7	(Slovenia) Luka Dončić	DNP		
PG	13	(Spain) Sergio Rodríguez	13	1	6
C	22	(Brazil) Augusto Lima	2	2	0
C	41	(Spain) Willy Hernangómez	2	0	0
SF	44	(Sweden) Jeffery Taylor	0	3	0
Head coach:
(Spanish Basketball Federation) Pablo Laso

== Final ==
21 February 2016	Herbalife Gran Canaria	81–85	Real Madrid	A Coruña
19:00 (CET)	Scoring by quarter: 18–24, 20–16, 21–22, 22–23
	Pts: Oliver 16; Rebs: Aguilar 8 Asts: Seeley, Pangos 4 PIR: Oliver 18	Boxscore	Pts: Ayón 15; Rebs: Nocioni 7 Asts: Rodríguez, Llull 5 PIR: Ayón 21	Arena: Coliseum; Attendance: 10,000; Referees: Martín Bertrán, García González, Cortés

Starters:			Pts	Reb	Ast
PG	3	(Canada) Kevin Pangos	3	4	4
SG	9	(Finland) Sasu Salin	3	0	1
SF	8	(United States) Brad Newley	8	2	0
PF	13	(Dominican Republic) Eulis Báez	8	4	1
C	14	(Latvia) Anžejs Pasečņiks	2	1	0
Reserves:					
PG	4	(Spain) Albert Oliver	16	3	2
C	7	(Senegal) Sitapha Savané	4	0	0
SG	11	(United States) D. J. Seeley	9	0	4
SG	21	(Spain) Oriol Paulí	DNP		
SF	22	(Spain) Xavi Rabaseda	14	3	0
C	23	(Slovenia) Alen Omić	8	3	2
PF	34	(Spain) Pablo Aguilar	6	8	0
Head coach:
(Spanish Basketball Federation) Aíto García Reneses

Herbalife Gran Canaria	Real Madrid

Copa del Rey MVP
(Mexico) Gustavo Ayón
Game rules
Game was played under FIBA rules.

2016 Copa del Rey winners
Real Madrid
26th title

Starters:			Pts	Reb	Ast
PG	23	(Spain) Sergio Llull	2	4	5
SG	20	(Azerbaijan) Jaycee Carroll	13	1	0
SF	8	(Lithuania) Jonas Mačiulis	11	4	0
PF	9	(Spain) Felipe Reyes	12	6	1
C	14	(Mexico) Gustavo Ayón	15	6	2
Reserves:					
SF	3	(United States) K. C. Rivers	10	3	0
PF	6	(Argentina) Andrés Nocioni	7	7	0
PG	7	(Slovenia) Luka Dončić	0	3	0
PG	13	(Spain) Sergio Rodríguez	11	2	5
C	22	(Brazil) Augusto Lima	4	5	1
C	41	(Spain) Willy Hernangómez	DNP		
SF	44	(Sweden) Jeffery Taylor	DNP		
Head coach:
(Spanish Basketball Federation) Pablo Laso
