= Mendia =

Mendia or Mendía is a surname of Basque origins. Notable people with the surname include:

- Borja Mendía (born 1994), Spanish basketball player
- Idoia Mendia (born 1965), Spanish politician
- Luis María Mendía (1925–2007), Argentine Navy admiral
- Marta Mendía (born 1975), Spanish high jumper
