= Alejandro Suárez =

Alejandro Suárez may refer to:

- Alejandro Suarez (constabulary) (1898-1965), Filipino constabulary officer
- Alejandro Suárez (runner) (born 1980), Mexican long-distance runner
- Alejandro Suárez Lozano (born 1980), Spanish film director and writer
- Alejandro Suárez Castro (born 1993), Spanish basketball player
- Alejandro Suárez Cardero (born 2003), known as Álex Cardero, Spanish footballer

== See also ==
- Alex Suarez (disambiguation)
