= Alex Suarez =

Alex Suarez may refer to:

- Alex Suarez (musician) (born 1981), American musician
- Álex Suárez (basketball) (born 1993), Spanish basketball player
- Álex Suárez (footballer, born 1993), Spanish footballer
- Álex Suárez (footballer, born 2003), Spanish footballer

== See also ==
- Alejandro Suárez (disambiguation)
