= Etinosa Erevbenagie =

Greek basketball player

Free agent
- Position: Point guard / shooting guard

Personal information
- Born: October 13, 1995 (age 31) Lagos, Nigeria
- Listed height: 6 ft 1.25 in (1.86 m)
- Listed weight: 187 lb (85 kg)

Career information
- Playing career: 2014–present

Career history
- 2014–2015: Kymis
- 2015–2016: Bilbao Basket
- 2015–2016: → Ametx Zornotza
- 2016–2019: Kavala
- 2019–2020: ENAD
- 2020–2021: Anorthosi
- 2021–2022: Digenis Akritas Morphou

Career highlights
- Cyprus Division B champion (2021)

Etinosa Erevbenagie (Greek: Ετινόσα Ερεμπενάζιε; born October 13, 1995) is a Greek professional basketball player. He played at the youth squads of Panathinaikos before starting his pro career.

== Early life ==
Erevbenagie was born in Lagos, Nigeria. He immigrated to Greece at a very young age and played with the youth squads of Panathinaikos, being a teammate with players such as Georgios Papagiannis, Vassilis Charalampopoulos, and Georgios Diamantakos.

== Professional career ==
After leaving Panathinaikos, Erevbenagie started his pro career with Kymis of the Greek B Basket League, being coached by Vassilis Bratsiakos. With Kymis, he won the promotion to the Greek A2 Basket League.

The next season, he joined Bilbao Basket of the Liga ACB. During that year, he didn't appear in a single game with Bilbao and he was loaned to Ametx Zornotza during the season.

The following season, Erevbenagie returned to Greece and signed with Kavala of the Greek A2 Basket League. During the season, he was one of the best young players in the league, averaging 12.3 points, 3.5 rebounds, and 3.5 assists per game.
