= Jermaine Thomas (basketball) =

American basketball player (born 1984)

Cuore Napoli Basket
- Position: Point guard
- League: Serie A2 Basket

Personal information
- Born: January 12, 1984 (age 42)
- Listed height: 6 ft 2 in (1.88 m)
- Listed weight: 176 lb (80 kg)

Career information
- High school: Governor Thomas Johnson (Frederick, Maryland)
- College: La Salle (2002–2006)
- NBA draft: 2006: undrafted
- Playing career: 2006–present

Career history
- 2006–2007: Dombóvár KC
- 2007: MAFC
- 2008: BC Körmend
- 2008–2009: Güssing Knights
- 2009–2010: BC Körmend
- 2010–2011: Eisbären Bremerhaven
- 2011: WBC Wels
- 2012–2015: Soproni KC
- 2015–2016: ICL Manresa
- 2016: Falco KC Szombathely
- 2016–2017: KK Sutjeska
- 2018–present: Cuore Napoli Basket

Jermaine Dontay Thomas (born January 12, 1984) is an American professional basketball player for Cuore Napoli Basket. He played basketball for Governor Thomas Johnson High School in Frederick, Maryland and La Salle University in Philadelphia. Thomas has played in several countries, including for Spanish team Bàsquet Manresa in Liga ACB. In 2019, Thomas was charged and sentenced to 3 years in jail with sex abuse at the Jefferson School in Frederick, Maryland
