= Dirk Mädrich =

German basketball player (born 1983)

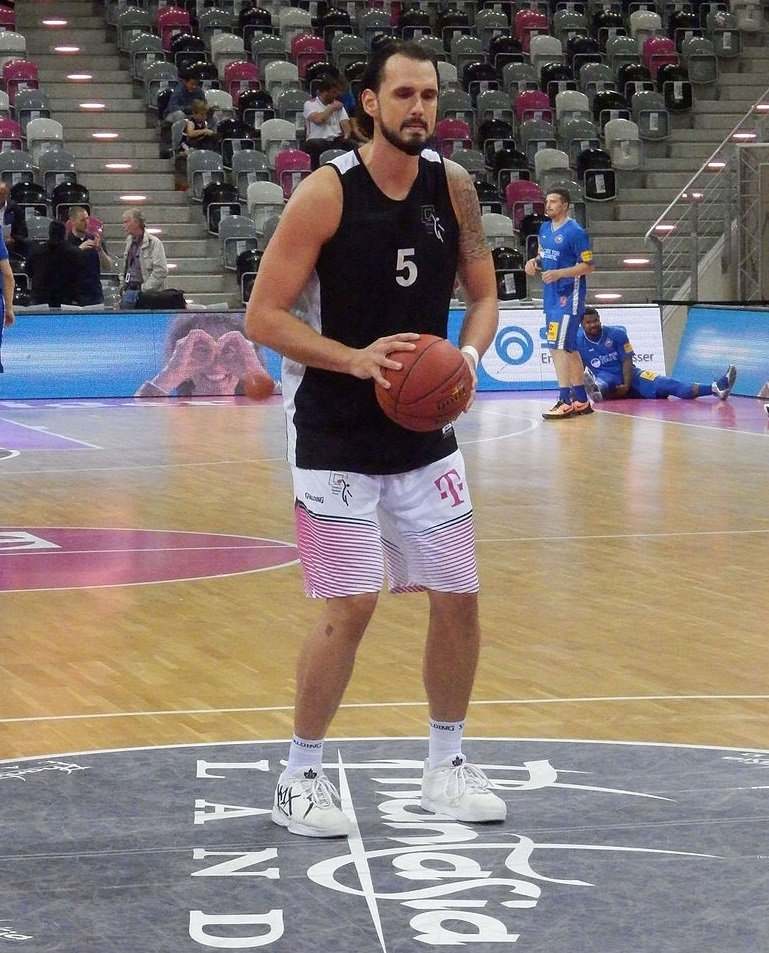
- Mädrich for Telekom Baskets Bonn in 2015

No. 20 – EWE Baskets Oldenburg
- Position: Forward / center
- League: Bundesliga; Champions League

Personal information
- Born: July 16, 1983 (age 43) Moers, Germany
- Listed height: 6 ft 11 in (2.11 m)
- Listed weight: 246 lb (112 kg)

Career information
- Playing career: 2000–present

Career history
- 2000–2001: BG Dorsten
- 2001–2004: Phantoms Braunschweig
- 2004–2005: Brose Bamberg
- 2005–2006: New Yorker Phantoms Braunschweig
- 2006–2007: SIG Strasbourg
- 2007–2009: Artland Dragons
- 2009–2010: Olympiada Patron
- 2010–2011: Gießen 46ers
- 2011–2014: Rasta Vechta
- 2014–2016: Telekom Baskets Bonn
- 2016–2017: EWE Baskets Oldenburg
- 2017–2018: Rasta Vechta

Dirk Mädrich (born 16 July 1983) is a German professional basketball player who currently plays for EWE Baskets Oldenburg of the German Basketball League (Basketball Bundesliga).
