= Basque basketball derby =

- Native name: Basque: Euskal derbia Spanish: Derbi vasco
- Sport: Basketball
- Location: (Basque Country (autonomous community)) Basque Country
- Teams: Baskonia; Bilbao Basket
- First meeting: Bilbao 57–104 Baskonia; 2004–05 ACB (3 October 2004)
- Latest meeting: Bilbao 69–76 Baskonia; 2025–26 ACB (15 February 2026)
- Stadiums: Buesa Arena (Vitoria-Gasteiz); Bilbao Arena (Bilbao)

Statistics
- Total meetings: 53
- Most wins: Baskonia (42)
- All-time record: Baskonia 42–11 Bilbao
- All-time series (Liga ACB only): Baskonia 37–9 Bilbao
- Regular season series: Baskonia 32–9 Bilbao
- Largest victory: Bilbao 57–104 Baskonia; 2004–05 ACB (3 October 2004)
- Smallest victory: Bilbao 79–80 Baskonia; 2011–12 ACB (29 December 2011); Baskonia 81–80 Bilbao; 2012–13 ACB (16 December 2012)
- Longest win streak: Baskonia (8)
- Current win streak: Baskonia (4)

The Basque basketball derby (Basque: Euskal derbia, Spanish: Derbi vasco), is the name given to the basketball matches between Baskonia from Vitoria-Gasteiz and Bilbao Basket from Bilbao, the two main basketball teams in the Basque Country.

== History ==
=== First games ===
Since the dissolution of Cajabilbao in 1994, Baskonia was the only Basque team in the Liga ACB until Bilbao Basket, founded in 2003, achieved promotion to the Spanish top league in 2004.

The first match between both teams was played on 3 October 2004, in the first round of the 2004–05 ACB season, at Pabellón La Casilla. Baskonia won by a huge 57–104, the biggest loss ever received by Bilbao Basket. After a second defeat, Bilbao won its first derby on 22 January 2006, by 92–78.

On 6 January 2007, Bizkaia Arena registered the highest attendance to date for a Liga ACB game with 15,414 people in the 78–92 win by Baskonia.

=== Rise of the rivalry and cup games ===
As Bilbao Basket started to improve its level, the rivalry between both teams increased. On 29 September 2007, Baskonia won the Supercopa by defeating Bilbao at Bizkaia Arena by 73–85. One year later, both teams played the first derby in the 2008 Copa del Rey semifinal and Baskonia won again by a narrow 68–66.

=== First playoffs ===
In the 2009 ACB Playoffs both teams met in the quarterfinals. Baskonia the series by 2–0 and would repeat this result again in the 2012 edition.

=== Derbies at EuroLeague ===
Bilbao Basket qualified for the first time to the EuroLeague on 2011, after finishing as runner-up of the 2010–11 ACB season. As Spain had five teams in the competition, both teams were drawn in the same group. Bilbao Basket won both games and eliminated Baskonia in the game played at Bilbao Arena, where the Men in black won by 77–72. This was the first time Baskonia did not qualify for the Top16 in the modern era of the Euroleague. Bilbao advanced in the competition until the quarterfinals, where they were eliminated by CSKA Moscow.

=== Brawl at Bilbao Arena and decline of Bilbao Basket ===
On March 1, 2015, the derby finished with a brawl where Dejan Todorović of Bilbao and Tornike Shengelia of Baskonia were disqualified and twelve players were ejected due to court invasion during the fight.

With four seconds left and Bilbao winning by a huge margin, despite the referee's call for a travelling, Todorović was going to dunk when he was hit by Shengelia. After this, the Serbian player pushed Shengelia from behind and the Georgian forward reacted with a punch. After this, all the players who were in the bench came into the court and started the brawl. When Shengelia was leaving the court after the disqualifying foul, he apologized to a child who was in the first row of the arena.

The ACB announced this brawl would have severe consequences and sanctions and would talk with the Spanish Basketball Federation for changing the disciplinary regulations. On March 5, the league provisionally suspended Todorović and Shengelia until the final resolution of the case.

Both clubs claimed to have the same sanctions than in 2004, when the brawl Real Madrid and Estudiantes occurred. Finally, on March 11, the Disciplinary Judge accorded to suspend Tornike Shengelia for five games, Dejan Todorović for four and a €3,000 fine to Bilbao Basket player Dairis Bertāns and to Baskonia brothers Mamadou and Ilimane Diop.

On 13 May 2018, Baskonia won a derby at Bilbao Arena by 78–74, thus relegating Bilbao Basket to the LEB Oro after 14 consecutive years in the top league. Bilbao returned to Liga ACB at the first opportunity, earning immediate promotion with a second-place finish in the 2018–19 LEB Oro season.

== Head-to-head statistics ==
Positions in Liga ACB
Season	BKN	BLB
2004–05	2	14
2005–06	2	15
2006–07	3	10
2007–08	1	7
2008–09	2	8
2009–10	1	9
2010–11	4	2
2011–12	3	6
2012–13	5	7
2013–14	6	14
2014–15	6	5
2015–16	4	10
2016–17	3	10
2017–18	2	17
2019–20	1	8
2020–21	5	17
2021–22	4	9
2022–23	5	12
2023–24	9	13
2024–25	8	16

Competition	GP	BKN	BLB
Liga ACB	41	32	9
ACB Playoffs	5	5	0
Copa del Rey	3	3	0
Supercopa	2	2	0
EuroLeague	2	0	2
Total in all games	53	42	11

== Results ==
=== At ACB Regular season ===
#	Season	Date	R	Boxscore	Home team	Score	Away team	Attendance
1	2004–05	3 October 2004	1		Bilbao	57 – 104	Baskonia	5,000
2	2004–05	26 February 2005	22		Baskonia	92 – 90	Bilbao	9,323
3	2005–06	22 January 2006	17		Bilbao	92 – 78	Baskonia	13,000
4	2005–06	19 April 2006	29		Baskonia	88 – 75	Bilbao	9,200
5	2006–07	6 January 2007	16		Bilbao	76 – 88	Baskonia	15,414
6	2006–07	12 May 2007	34		Baskonia	95 – 63	Bilbao	8,900
7	2007–08	2 December 2007	10		Baskonia	78 – 80	Bilbao	9,500
8	2007–08	15 March 2003	29		Bilbao	60 – 78	Baskonia	5,000
9	2008–09	13 December 2008	10		Baskonia	97 – 79	Bilbao	9,700
10	2008–09	15 March 2009	26		Bilbao	85 – 72	Baskonia	11,500
11	2009–10	15 October 2009	2		Baskonia	85 – 76	Bilbao	9,200
12	2009–10	24 January 2010	19		Bilbao	71 – 86	Baskonia	11,987
13	2010–11	12 December 2010	11		Bilbao	99 – 95	Baskonia	8,793
14	2010–11	17 April 2011	30		Baskonia	89 – 75	Bilbao	9,500
15	2011–12	29 December 2011	13		Bilbao	79 – 80	Baskonia	10,014
16	2011–12	6 May 2012	34		Baskonia	100 – 70	Bilbao	13,826
17	2012–13	16 December 2012	12		Baskonia	81 – 80	Bilbao	14,381
18	2012–13	1 May 2013	29		Bilbao	75 – 93	Baskonia	10,003
19	2013–14	22 December 2013	11		Bilbao	96 – 92	Baskonia	9,804
20	2013–14	26 April 2014	29		Baskonia	76 – 70	Bilbao	8,193
21	2014–15	26 October 2014	4		Baskonia	86 – 74	Bilbao	8,629
22	2014–15	1 March 2015	22		Bilbao	93 – 75	Baskonia	9,993
23	2015–16	13 December 2015	10		Bilbao	89 – 83	Baskonia	9,837
24	2015–16	6 March 2016	22		Baskonia	108 – 62	Bilbao	12,341
25	2016–17	15 January 2017	17		Baskonia	84 – 63	Bilbao	12,118
26	2016–17	10 May 2017	33		Bilbao	64 – 75	Baskonia	9,318
27	2017–18	9 December 2017	11		Baskonia	94 – 71	Bilbao	10,215
28	2017–18	13 May 2018	32		Bilbao	74 – 78	Baskonia	9,842
29	2019–20	13 October 2019	4		Bilbao	79 – 75	Baskonia	9,047
30	2020–21	7 November 2020	10		Baskonia	82 – 68	Bilbao	–
31	2020–21	21 March 2021	27		Bilbao	72 – 85	Baskonia	–
32	2021–22	11 December 2021	13		Baskonia	101 – 86	Bilbao	7,032
33	2021–22	27 March 2022	26		Bilbao	62 – 90	Baskonia	8,487
34	2022–23	30 October 2022	6		Bilbao	70 – 81	Baskonia	9,127
35	2022–23	26 March 2023	24		Baskonia	100 – 78	Bilbao	10,305
36	2023–24	30 September 2023	3		Baskonia	92 – 72	Bilbao	15,504
37	2023–24	24 March 2024	26		Bilbao	82 – 80	Baskonia	9,586
38	2024–25	8 December 2024	10		Bilbao	67 – 69	Baskonia	9,386
39	2024–25	24 May 2025	33		Baskonia	100 – 97	Bilbao	9,087
40	2025–26	23 November 2025	8		Baskonia	110 – 91	Bilbao	8,779
41	2025–26	15 February 2026	20		Bilbao	69 – 76	Baskonia	9,602

=== At ACB playoffs ===
#	Season	Date	R	Boxscore	Home team	Score	Away team	Arena	Attendance
1	2009	17 May 2009	QF		Baskonia	90 – 86	Bilbao	Buesa Arena, Vitoria-Gasteiz	9,500
2	2009	19 May 2009	QF		Bilbao	76 – 97	Baskonia	Bizkaia Arena, Barakaldo	10,500
3	2012	17 May 2012	QF		Baskonia	77 – 73	Bilbao	Buesa Arena, Vitoria-Gasteiz	14,162
4	2012	20 May 2012	QF		Bilbao	88 – 90	Baskonia	Bilbao Arena, Bilbao	9,430
5	2020	17 June 2020	GS		Bilbao	64 – 87	Baskonia	La Fonteta, Valencia	–

=== At Copa del Rey ===
#	Season	Date	R	Boxscore	Home team	Score	Away team	Arena	Attendance
1	2008	9 February 2008	SF		Baskonia	68 – 66	Bilbao	Buesa Arena, Vitoria-Gasteiz	9,463
2	2010	19 February 2010	QF		Bilbao	62 – 75	Baskonia	Bizkaia Arena, Barakaldo	14,417
3	2011	11 February 2011	QF		Baskonia	76 – 74	Bilbao	Palacio de Deportes, Madrid	12,850

=== At Supercopa ===
#	Season	Date	R	Boxscore	Home team	Score	Away team	Arena	Attendance
1	2007	29 September 2007	F		Bilbao	73 – 85	Baskonia	Bizkaia Arena, Bilbao	12,200
2	2011	30 September 2011	SF		Bilbao	88 – 93	Baskonia	Bilbao Arena, Bilbao	8,230

=== At EuroLeague ===
#	Season	Date	Stage	R	Boxscore	Home team	Score	Away team	Arena	Attendance
1	2011–12	16 November 2011	RS	5		Baskonia	84 – 89	Bilbao	Iradier Arena, Vitoria-Gasteiz	8,460
2	2011–12	22 December 2011	RS	10		Bilbao	77 – 72	Baskonia	Bilbao Arena, Bilbao	10,014

== See also ==
- Basque derby (football)
