= Jordi Grimau =

Spanish basketball player

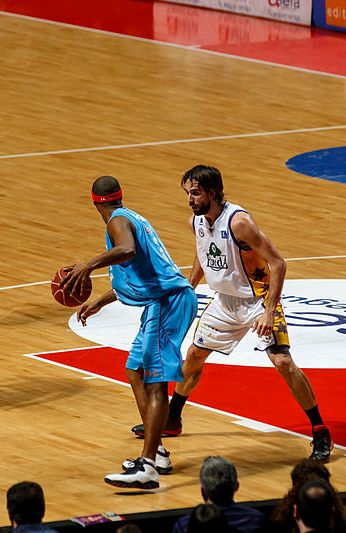
- Grimau defending on Tariq Kirksay

Personal information
- Born: 17 June 1983 (age 43) Barcelona, Spain
- Listed height: 6 ft 5 in (1.96 m)
- Listed weight: 185 lb (84 kg)

Career information
- Playing career: 2001–2024
- Position: Shooting guard
- Number: 00

Career history
- 2001–2002: FC Barcelona
- 2002–2003: Lleida Bàsquet
- 2003–2004: Aguas Valencia
- 2004–2005: CB Tarragona
- 2005–2006: TAU Cerámica
- 2006–2007: Alerta Cantabria
- 2007–2011: Bàsquet Manresa
- 2011–2014: UCAM Murcia
- 2012–2013: →Blancos de Rueda Valladolid
- 2014–2016: Gipuzkoa Basket
- 2016–2017: Movistar Estudiantes
- 2017–2020: Palencia Baloncesto
- 2020–2024: CB Sant Antoni

Jordi Grimau i Gragera (born 17 June 1983 in Barcelona) is a Spanish former professional basketball player. Playing for many teams throughout his career, Grimau competed in the main categories of the Spanish basketball league system, including Liga ACB, LEB Oro, LEB Plata and Liga EBA. Grimau retired in 2024.

== Playing career ==
- 2000–01 (Spain) FC Barcelona (youth team)
- 2001–02 (Spain) FC Barcelona
- 2002–03 (Spain) Caprabo Lleida
- 2003–04 (Spain) Aguas Valencia
- 2004–05 (Spain) CB Tarragona
- 2005–06 (Spain) TAU Cerámica
- 2006–07 (Spain) Alerta Cantabria
- 2007–11 (Spain) Assignia Manresa
- 2011–14 (Spain) UCAM Murcia
- 2012–13 → (Spain) Blancos de Rueda Valladolid
- 2014–16 (Spain) Gipuzkoa Basket
- 2016–17 (Spain) Movistar Estudiantes
- 2017–present (Spain) Chocolates Trapa Palencia

== Honours ==
TAU Cerámica

- Copa del Rey: 1
  - 2006
