= Georgios Bogris =

Greek basketball player (born 1989)

Milon
- Position: Center
- League: National League 1

Personal information
- Born: 19 February 1989 (age 37) Thespies, Greece
- Listed height: 2.10 m (6 ft 11 in)
- Listed weight: 109 kg (240 lb)

Career information
- NBA draft: 2011: undrafted
- Playing career: 2006–present

Career history
- 2006–2009: Ilysiakos
- 2009–2011: Panathinaikos
- 2011–2012: Peristeri
- 2012: Aris Thessaloniki
- 2012–2013: Panionios
- 2013–2014: PAOK Thessaloniki
- 2014–2015: Andorra
- 2015–2016: Bilbao Basket
- 2016–2017: Canarias
- 2017–2019: Olympiacos
- 2019: Promitheas Patras
- 2019–2021: Canarias
- 2021–2022: AEK Athens
- 2022–2023: Apollon Patras
- 2023–2024: Maroussi
- 2025: Holargos
- 2025–2026: Palaio Faliro
- 2026–: Milon

Career highlights
- EuroLeague champion (2011); FIBA Intercontinental Cup champion (2020); FIBA Champions League champion (2017); All-FIBA Champions League First Team (2017); 2× Greek League All Star (2019, 2023); Greek League Most Improved Player (2014)
Medals
Men's basketball
Representing Greece
FIBA Europe Under-20 Championship
Gold medal – first place	2009 Greece	Under-20
FIBA Europe Under-18 Championship
Silver medal – second place	2007 Spain	Under-18

Georgios Bogris (alternate spelling: Giorgos Greek pronunciation: [ˈʝorɣos ˈboɣris], Greek: Γιώργος Μπόγρης; born 19 February 1989 nicknamed as "Bogrihno") is a Greek professional basketball player. He is 2.10 m (6 ft 10 3/4 in) tall, 109 kg (240 lbs.) in weight, and he plays at the center position for Milon.

== Professional career ==
Bogris began his pro career in the Greek 2nd Division with Ilysiakos in 2006. In 2009, he signed a four-year deal with the 1st-tier level Greek Basket League club Panathinaikos. In August 2011, Bogris signed with Peristeri, but he was released from the team in November.

In the summer of 2012, Bogris signed with Panionios of the Greek Basket League. In September 2013, he signed with PAOK. In August 2014, Bogris signed with Liga ACB team Andorra.

In July 2015, he reached a two-year agreement with Spanish club Bilbao Basket. On 14 July 2016, Bogris signed with Spanish team Iberostar Tenerife. With the Canarians, he was named MVP of the sixth round of the 2016–17 Basketball Champions League.

On 30 July 2017, Bogris signed a three-year contract with Olympiacos. On 4 July 2019, Bogris was officially released from his contract with the Reds.

On 20 July 2019, he agreed to a three-year deal with Promitheas Patras. On 5 December 2019, Bogris and Promitheas parted ways for the player to transfer to Liga ACB and Basketball Champions League club Tenerife, where he enjoyed much success in the past.

On 15 August 2021, Bogris signed with AEK Athens. He went on paid suspension in October of the same year, after a falling-out with head coach Stefanos Dedas.

On 9 February 2022, Bogris signed with Apollon Patras for the rest of the season. In 10 games with Apollon, he averaged 4.6 points and 5.7 rebounds in 24 minutes per contest. On 11 August 2022, he renewed his contract with the club and was named team captain. In 22 league games, he averaged 5.1 points, 5 rebounds and 1.8 assists in 22 minutes per contest.

On 12 October 2023, Bogris moved back to Athens for Maroussi.

== National team career ==
=== Greek junior national team ===
With Greece's junior national teams, Bogris played at the 2004 FIBA Europe Under-16 Championship and the 2005 FIBA Europe Under-16 Championship. He also played at the 2006 FIBA Europe Under-18 Championship. He won the silver medal at the 2007 FIBA Europe Under-18 Championship. He also played at the 2008 FIBA Europe Under-20 Championship, and he won the gold medal at the 2009 FIBA Europe Under-20 Championship.

=== Greek senior national team ===
Bogris has also been a member of the senior men's Greek national basketball team. He was selected to Greece's 12-man roster for the 2016 Turin FIBA World Olympic Qualifying Tournament. He also played at the EuroBasket 2017.

== Career statistics ==
Legend
GP	Games played	GS	Games started	MPG	Minutes per game
FG%	Field-goal percentage	3P%	3-point field-goal percentage	FT%	Free-throw percentage
RPG	Rebounds per game	APG	Assists per game	SPG	Steals per game
BPG	Blocks per game	PPG	Points per game	PIR	Performance index rating
**Bold**	Career high

=== EuroLeague ===
†	Denotes seasons in which Bogris won the EuroLeague

Year	Team	GP	GS	MPG	FG%	3P%	FT%	RPG	APG	SPG	BPG	PPG	PIR
2009–10	Panathinaikos	1	0	3.0	**1.000**	—	**1.000**	1.0	—	—	—	**4.0**	**4.0**
2010–11†	Panathinaikos	2	0	3.0	.000	—	—	.5	**.5**	—	**.5**	0.0	−2.5
2017–18	Olympiacos	17	**5**	**6.9**	.333	—	.250	**1.8**	.4	.1	.1	0.8	0.6
2018–19	Olympiacos	**23**	2	5.2	.594	—	.400	.8	.3	**.3**	.0	1.7	0.7
Career		43	7	5.7	.464	—	.400	1.2	.3	.2	.1	1.3	0.6

== Personal life ==
Originally from Thespies, and raised in Thebes, Bogris has three younger sisters. He had a long-term personal relationship with the famous Greek singer Elli Kokkinou, from 2010 to 2017. Bogris has also dated briefly with the Greek-Cypriot singer Eleftheria Eleftheriou.

== Awards and accomplishments ==
=== Pro career ===
- 2× Greek League Champion: (2010, 2011)
- EuroLeague Champion: (2011)
- 2× Greek All-Star: (2014, 2019, 2023)
- Greek League Most Improved Player: (2014)
- FIBA Champions League Star Lineup Best Team: (2017)
- FIBA Champions League Champion: (2017)

=== Greek junior national team ===
- 2007 FIBA Europe Under-18 Championship: Silver
- 2009 FIBA Europe Under-20 Championship: Gold
