= Álex Mumbrú =

Spanish basketball player and coach

- Mumbrú with Virtus Bologna in 2026

Virtus Bologna
- Title: Head coach
- League: LBA; EuroLeague

Personal information
- Born: 12 June 1979 (age 47) Barcelona, Spain
- Listed height: 2.02 m (6 ft 8 in)

Career information
- Playing career: 1997–2018
- Position: Small forward / power forward
- Number: 15
- Coaching career: 2018–present

Career history

Playing
- 1997–2002: Joventut Badalona
- 2002–2004: Real Madrid
- 2004–2006: Joventut Badalona
- 2006–2009: Real Madrid
- 2009–2018: Bilbao

Coaching
- 2018–2022: Bilbao
- 2022–2024: Valencia
- 2024–present: Germany
- 2026–present: Virtus Bologna

Career highlights
- As player: EuroCup champion (2007); FIBA EuroChallenge champion (2006); Spanish League champion (2007); All-Spanish League Team (2016)
Medals
Men's basketball
Representing Spain
Summer Olympics
Silver medal – second place	2008 Beijing
World Cup
Gold medal – first place	2006 Japan
FIBA EuroBasket
Gold medal – first place	2009 Poland
Silver medal – second place	2007 Spain
Bronze medal – third place	2013 Slovenia
Mediterranean Games
Gold medal – first place	2001 Tunis
Bronze medal – third place	2005 Almería
Head coach for Germany
FIBA EuroBasket
Gold medal – first place	2025 Cyprus–Finland–Poland–Latvia

Álex Mumbrú Murcia (born 12 June 1979) is a Spanish professional basketball coach and former player who is the current head coach for Virtus Bologna of the Italian Lega Basket Serie A (LBA) and the EuroLeague, and for Germany men's national team.

== Professional career ==
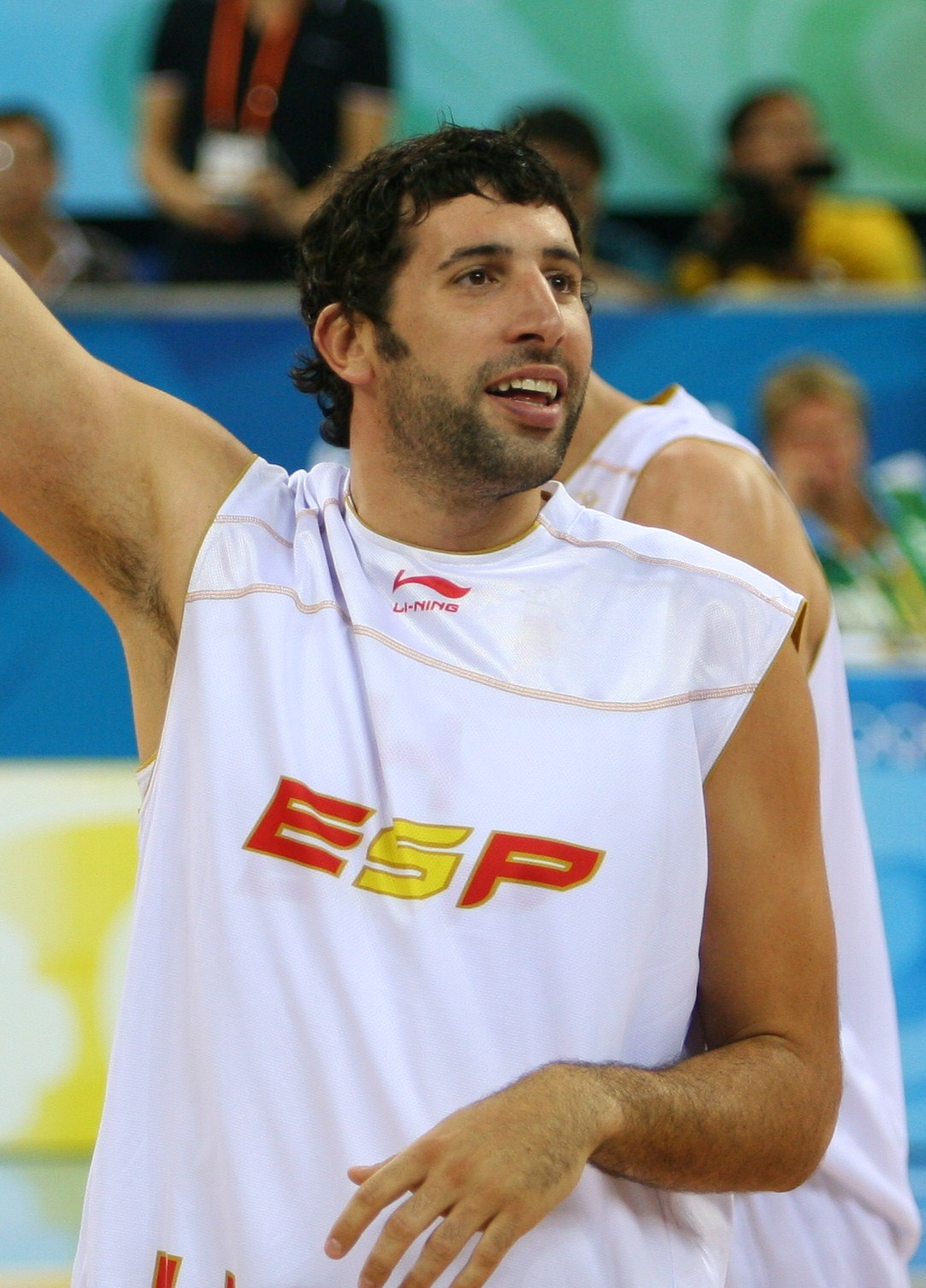
Mumbrú with Spain in 2008

Mumbrú began his career playing with Sant Josep Badalona of the Liga EBA, the farm team of Joventut in the 1997–98 and 1998–99 seasons, where he also played several games with Joventut's senior team in the Liga ACB. In 2002, he joined Real Madrid, with whom he finished as runner-up in the 2003–04 ULEB Cup, losing 83–72 to Hapoel Jerusalem in Charleroi.

In 2004, he returned to Joventut, where he played until 2006. In both seasons, the team qualified for the Liga ACB playoffs, reaching the semifinals in the 2005–06 season. In 2006, he also won the 2005–06 FIBA EuroCup.

In the summer of 2006, he signed for Real Madrid. In the first season of his second spell with Real Madrid, the 2006–07 season, he won the 2006–07 Liga ACB against Barcelona and the 2006–07 ULEB Cup against BC Lietuvos Rytas. He also finished as runner-up in the 2007 Copa del Rey, losing the final to Barcelona. In the following two seasons, he played in the Liga ACB playoffs and the Copa del Rey, but did not reach either final. In the 2008–09 EuroLeague, Real Madrid reached the quarter-finals, where they were eliminated.

At the end of the 2008–09 season, Real Madrid declined to exercise its right of first refusal over the player, and Mumbrú subsequently joined Bilbao Basket on a three-year contract. He reached the final of the 2010–11 Liga ACB, where Bilbao Basket lost to Barcelona. He also played in the Liga ACB playoffs in three further seasons, 2012, 2013 and 2015, being eliminated in the quarter-finals on each occasion. He played in the 2010, 2011, 2013, 2015 and 2016 editions of the Copa del Rey, being eliminated in the quarter-finals in the first four and in the semifinals in the last.

In the 2011–12 EuroLeague, the only season in which Bilbao Basket participated in the competition, the team reached the quarter-finals. The following year, they lost the EuroCup final to Lokomotiv Kuban. In the 2013–14 EuroCup, they were eliminated in the Last 32.

On 28 March 2015, Mumbrú became Bilbao Basket's all-time leading scorer, and on 28 May 2015, after being eliminated in the ACB quarter-finals, he became the club's all-time leading playoff scorer after scoring 18 points to bring his total to 163. He also became the player with the most minutes played, with 419.

In August 2015, Mumbrú renewed his contract with Bilbao Basket for two more seasons, through 2017. On 26 September 2017, he announced that he would retire from basketball at the end of the 2017–18 ACB season. On 28 May, he sent a farewell letter to basketball and retired.

At the time of his retirement, he ranked sixth all-time in Liga ACB games played, with 677; fifth in minutes played, with 16,931; ninth in points, with 7,435; 13th in rebounds, with 2,499; 24th in assists, with 1,261; third in three-pointers made, with 901; and 30th in steals, with 595. In 677 games, he averaged 11 points, 3.7 rebounds and 1.7 assists in 25 minutes per game.

== Spain national team ==
Mumbrú has played with the senior men's Spain national team that won the gold medal at the 2006 FIBA World Championship, the silver medal at the EuroBasket 2007, the silver medal at the 2008 Summer Olympics, and the gold medal at the EuroBasket 2009. In 2010, he was included in the Spain national basketball team squad for the 2010 FIBA World Championship in Turkey, where Spain were eliminated in the quarter-finals by Serbia.

Prior to the EuroBasket 2011, the 32-year-old Mumbrú announced his retirement from the national team. However, he returned to represent Spain at the EuroBasket 2013.

He made 113 appearances for Spain, scoring 541 points at an average of 4.8 points per game.

== Coaching career ==
On 5 July 2018, he was appointed head coach of Bilbao Basket, a position he held for four seasons.

On 14 June 2022 he signed a three-year contract as head coach with Valencia of the Spanish Liga ACB. On 5 April 2024, he was fired as head coach following a 69–98 home loss to ASVEL Basket.

On 15 August 2024, he was appointed head coach of the Germany national team, replacing Canadian coach Gordon Herbert, who decided to step down following the 2024 Paris Olympics. He coached Germany at EuroBasket 2025, where they won the gold medal.

In August 2026, he signed as head coach of Italian club Virtus Bologna.
