= Clevin Hannah =

American-Senegalese basketball player

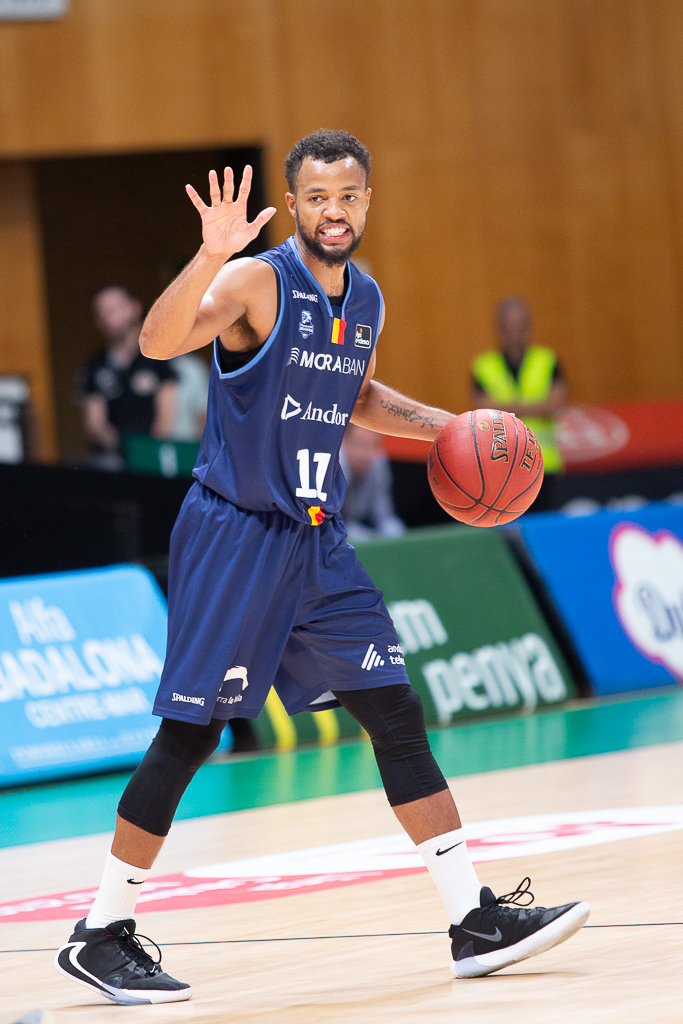
- Hannah with MoraBanc Andorra in 2019

Personal information
- Born: November 15, 1987 (age 39) Rochester, New York
- Listed height: 5 ft 11 in (1.80 m)
- Listed weight: 157 lb (71 kg)

Career information
- High school: Holly Springs (Holly Springs, Mississippi)
- College: Paris JC (2006–2007); Chipola College (2007–2008); Wichita State (2008–2010)
- NBA draft: 2010: undrafted
- Playing career: 2010–2026
- Position: Point guard
- Number: 11, 5, 8, 14

Career history
- 2010–2011: Miercurea Ciuc
- 2011–2012: Kauhajoen Karhu
- 2012–2013: ALM Évreux
- 2013–2014: SLUC Nancy
- 2014–2015: Joventut Badalona
- 2015–2016: Bilbao Basket
- 2016: Büyükçekmece
- 2017: Lietuvos rytas
- 2017–2018: UCAM Murcia
- 2018–2019: Gran Canaria
- 2019–2022: Andorra
- 2022–2023: Fuenlabrada
- 2023: Scafati Basket
- 2023–2024: Basquet Menorca
- 2024: Halcones de Xalapa
- 2026: Lobos de Puebla
Medals
Men's basketball
Representing Senegal
AfroBasket
Bronze medal – third place	2017 Tunisia/Senegal

Clevin Finley Hannah (born November 15, 1987) is an American-Senegalese former professional basketball player. Standing at 5 ft 11 in (1.80 m), he played at the point guard position.

== Professional career ==
Hannah began his professional career with Perla Harghitei Miercurea Ciuc of the Liga Națională, during the 2010–11 season. In 2011, he joined Kauhajoen Karhu of the Korisliiga. In 2012, he joined ALM Évreux Basket of the LNB Pro B and in 2013 he moved to SLUC Nancy of the LNB Pro A. In 2014, he signed a one-year contract with FIATC Joventut. In 2015, he signed a two-year contract with Bilbao Basket during which he won the Liga ACB.

On July 20, 2016, Hannah signed with the Turkish club Büyükçekmece Basketbol.

On December 28, 2016, Hannah signed with Lietuvos rytas Vilnius. On May 24, 2017, it was reported that Hannah along with other American-born teammates Corey Fisher and Taylor Brown were partying and consuming alcohol in Vilnius nightclubs right after losing the Game 3 of the LKL Playoffs on May 20. All of them were denying the fact but the incontestable pictures were published, which shattered all the doubts. The semi-final game was crucial as following it the series moved to Panevėžys and were lost 1–3, resulting in second shocking fiasco during the same season for the club. On the same May 24, all three players were suspended from the team. On May 25, head coach Rimas Kurtinaitis said that it was not the first time when all three players were behaving unprofessionally and that they were ignoring previous warnings. Some witnesses noted that Taylor Brown previously was also consuming drugs.

On July 19, 2018, Hannah signed a one-year deal with Herbalife Gran Canaria of the Liga ACB and the EuroLeague.

On July 24, 2019, Hannah signed a three-year deal with MoraBanc Andorra.

On July 28, 2022, he signed with Fuenlabrada of the Liga ACB.

On January 23, 2023, he signed with Scafati Basket of the Italian Lega Basket Serie A.

== Career statistics ==
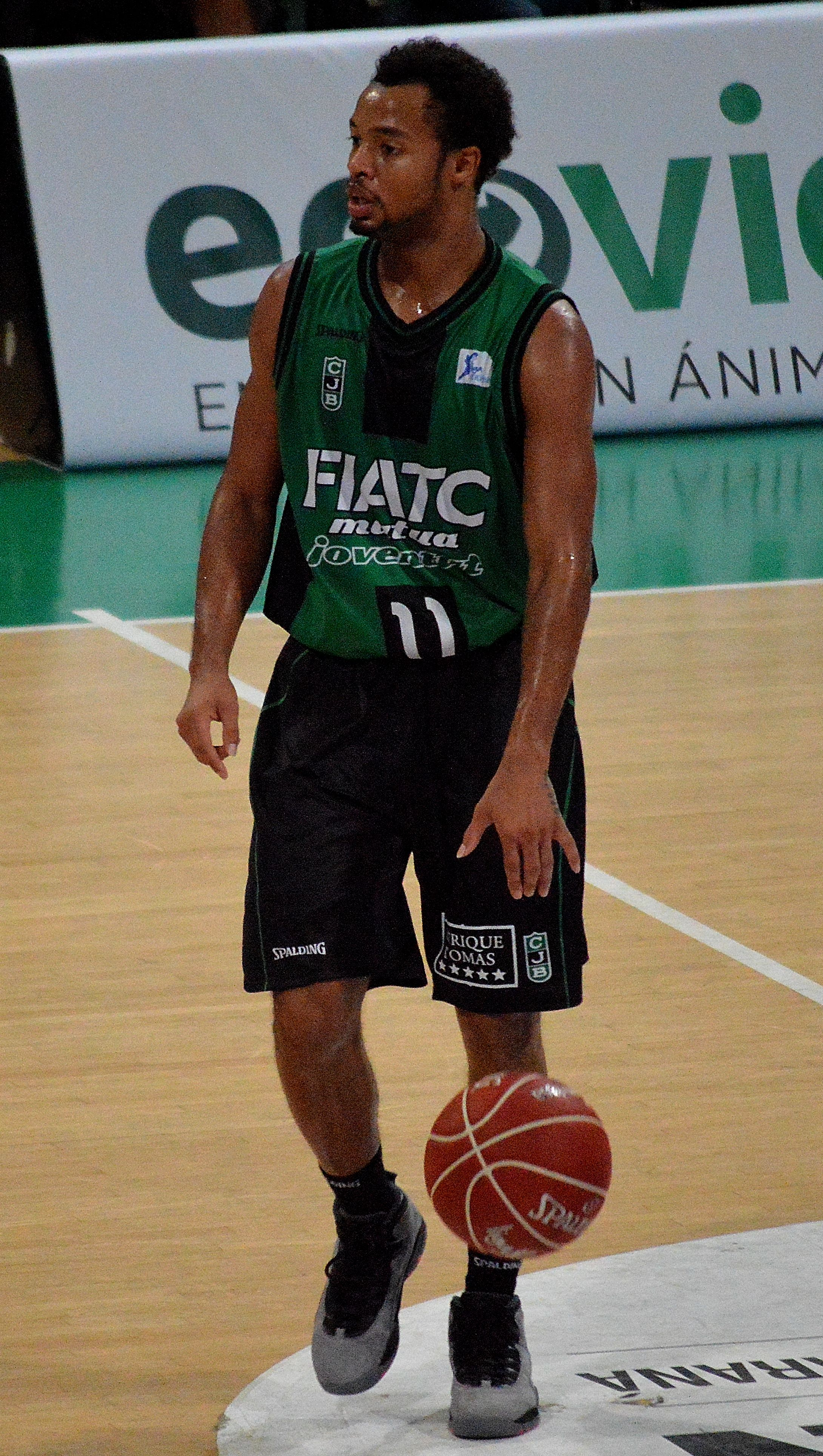
Hannah with Joventut in 2014

Legend
GP	Games played	GS	Games started	MPG	Minutes per game
FG%	Field-goal percentage	3P%	3-point field-goal percentage	FT%	Free-throw percentage
RPG	Rebounds per game	APG	Assists per game	SPG	Steals per game
BPG	Blocks per game	PPG	Points per game	PIR	Performance index rating
**Bold**	Career high

=== Domestic leagues ===
Year	Team	League	GP	MPG	FG%	3P%	FT%	RPG	APG	SPG	BPG	PPG
2010–11	(Romania) Miercurea Ciuc	LNBM	15	34.0	.554	.487	.846	2.9	6.3	1.8	.1	21.2
2011–12	(Finland) Kauhajoen Karhu	Korisliiga	40	31.9	.530	.477	.889	3.6	4.5	1.4	.1	18.7
2012–13	(France) ALM Évreux	Pro B	34	33.5	.511	.471	.911	3.0	5.4	1.7	.0	17.1
2013–14	(France) SLUC Nancy	Pro A	30	26.7	.435	.379	.795	2.4	4.9	9	.1	10.4
2014–15	(Spain) Joventut	ACB	35	19.0	.433	.385	.857	1.3	2.4	.8	.0	10.2
2015–16	(Spain) Bilbao Basket	ACB	33	23.5	.453	.414	.852	2.1	3.5	1.1	.0	12.3
2016–17	(Turkey) Büyükçekmece	BSL	8	27.1	.400	.361	.833	1.9	4.0	1.0	.0	9.5
2016–17	(Lithuania) Lietuvos rytas	LKL	17	15.5	.495	.417	.765	1.1	2.3	.6	.0	6.9
2017–18	(Spain) UCAM Murcia	ACB	32	25.2	.466	.384	.889	2.5	4.2	.8	.0	12.8
2018–19	(Spain) Gran Canaria	ACB	26	22.3	.462	.448	.893	1.7	4.5	.9	.0	11.6
2019–20	Andorra	ACB	23	21.0	.462	.364	.914	1.9	3.6	1.2	.0	12.1
2020–21	Andorra	ACB	36	24.4	.465	.419	.894	1.7	4.5	.7	.0	12.7
2021–22	Andorra	ACB	33	24.0	.464	.468	.912	1.8	3.0	.8	.0	12.2
2022–23	(Spain) Fuenlabrada	ACB	17	17.2	.377	.317	.813	.9	2.4	.5	.1	6.6
2022–23	(Italy) Scafati	LBA	14	22.1	.472	.514	.848	1.1	4.1	.9	.0	8.2
2023–24	(Spain) Bàsquet Menorca	LEB Oro	33	30.5	.405	.379	.897	1.5	4.5	1.2	.0	14.6
2024–25	(Mexico) Halcones de Xalapa	LNBP	32	22.4	.533	.439	.804	1.9	4.4	.8	.1	11.8
Career			458	25.1	.469	.421	.867	2.1	4.1	1.0	.0	12.8
