= Dejan Todorović =

Serbian basketball player

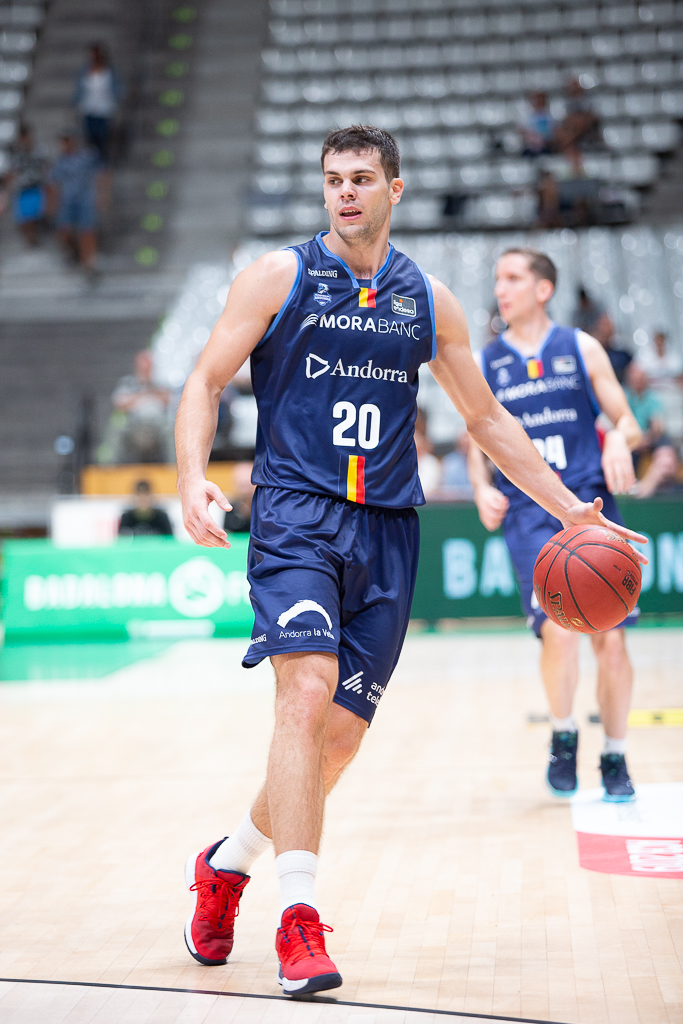
- Todorović, playing for Andorra in 2019

El Calor de Cancún
- Position: Small forward
- League: LNBP

Personal information
- Born: 29 May 1994 (age 32) Mrkonjić Grad, Bosnia and Herzegovina
- Listed height: 6 ft 5 in (1.96 m)
- Listed weight: 210 lb (95 kg)

Career information
- NBA draft: 2016: undrafted
- Playing career: 2011–present

Career history
- 2011–2016: Málaga
- 2012–2014: →Axarquía
- 2014–2016: →Bilbao
- 2016–2018: Bilbao
- 2018–2019: Murcia
- 2019–2020: Andorra
- 2020–2022: Canarias
- 2022–2023: Granada
- 2024–present: Cancún

Career highlights
- Champions League champion (2022)

Dejan Todorović (Serbian Cyrillic: Дејан Тодоровић; born 29 May 1994) is a Serbian professional basketball player for El Calor de Cancún of the LNBP.

== Professional career ==
Todorović began his career in the KK Sport Key from Novi Sad in 2009 where he was trained by former basketball player Dragan Lukovski until 2011 when he moved to Unicaja's junior team, during the 2011–12 season. In 2012, he was loaned to the Unicaja's reserve team. In 2014, he was loaned to Bilbao Basket.

On March 1, 2015, the Basque derby with Baskonia ended in a brawl that started with a confrontation between Todorović and Tornike Shengelia. Both players were disqualified and 12 players were ejected due to the court invasion that took place during the fight. With mere seconds on the clock and Bilbao leading the game, Shengelia fouled Todorović as the latter attempted a dunk. The Serbian player pushed Shengelia from behind and the Georgian forward threw a punch in response. The exchange prompted the bench players of both teams to enter the court and subsequently started the brawl.

The ACB announced the brawl would have severe consequences and sanctions and initiated talks with the Spanish Basketball Federation to strengthen disciplinary regulations. On March 5, the league provisionally suspended Todorović and Shengelia until the final resolution of the case.

After the cautionary suspension of both players was announced, Bilbao and Baskonia released a joint statement expressing their disapproval. On March 11, Shengelia would finally receive a 5 game suspension while Todorović was suspended for four games. Additionally, Dairis Bertāns of Bilbao Basket and the brothers Mamadou and Ilimane Diop of Baskonia received a €3,000 fine.

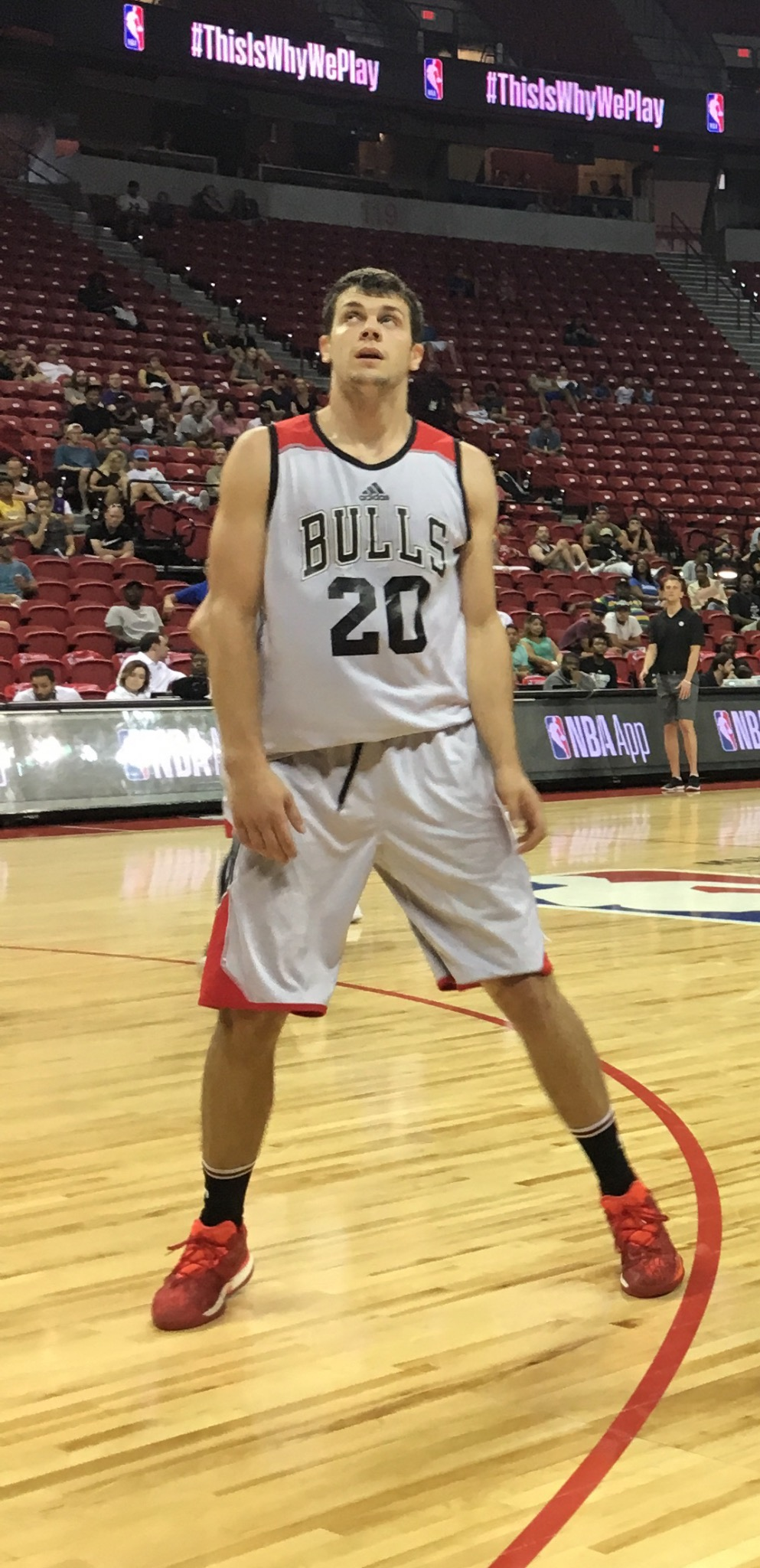
Todorović in the 2017 NBA Summer League

In 2015, he signed a new two-year contract extension with Unicaja and he was loaned to Bilbao Basket.

On July 23, 2016, he left Unicaja and signed a three-year contract with Bilbao Basket. Todorović played for Chicago Bulls during the 2017 NBA Summer League.

On August 9, 2018, he signed a one-year deal with UCAM Murcia of the Liga ACB. On July 9, 2019, Todorović signed a one-year deal with MoraBanc Andorra of the Liga ACB.

On July 8, 2020, he has signed with Iberostar Tenerife of the Liga ACB. He tore his ACL on his left knee on September 6, during a friendly game.

On August 11, 2022, he has signed with Covirán Granada of the Liga ACB.

In September 2024, Todorović signed with El Calor de Cancún of the LNBP.

== International career ==
In November 2017, Todorović made his debut for the Serbian national team in the qualification for the 2019 FIBA World Cup. In July 2019, national team head coach Saša Đorđević included him on the preliminary list of 18 players being considered for the final roster for the FIBA World Cup, but following the camp, he was cut from the 14-man squad as the team began its pre-tournament friendlies.

== Career statistics ==
Legend
GP	Games played	GS	Games started	MPG	Minutes per game
FG%	Field-goal percentage	3P%	3-point field-goal percentage	FT%	Free-throw percentage
RPG	Rebounds per game	APG	Assists per game	SPG	Steals per game
BPG	Blocks per game	PPG	Points per game	PIR	Performance index rating
**Bold**	Career high

=== Euroleague ===
Year	Team	GP	GS	MPG	FG%	3P%	FT%	RPG	APG	SPG	BPG	PPG	PIR
2013–14	Unicaja	5	0	1.28	1.000	.000	.000	.2	.2	.2	.0	.4	.4

=== Domestic leagues ===
Year	Team	GP	GS	MPG	FG%	3P%	FT%	RPG	APG	SPG	BPG	PPG	PIR
2014–15	Bilbao	31	10	9.0	.430	.222	.818	1.19	.5	.5	.0	3.6	2.2
2015–16	Bilbao	0	0	0.0	.000	.000	.000	.0	.0	.0	.0	.0	.0

== See also ==
- List of Serbian NBA Summer League players
