= Raül López (basketball) =

Spanish basketball player (born 1980)

Raúl López
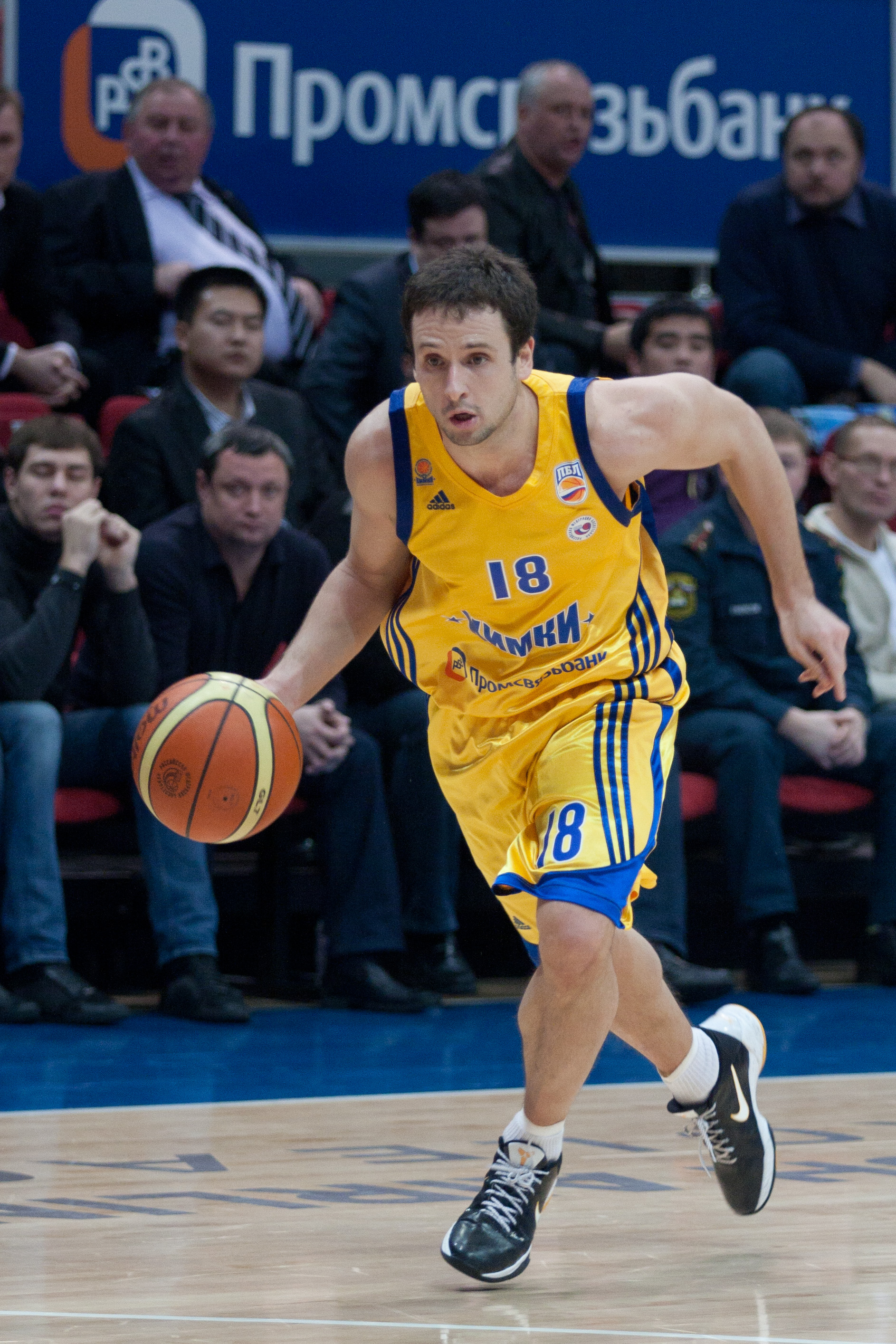
- López with Khimki Moscow Region in 2010.

Personal information
- Born: 15 April 1980 (age 46) Vic, Spain
- Listed height: 6 ft 0 in (1.83 m)
- Listed weight: 185 lb (84 kg)

Career information
- NBA draft: 2001: 1st round, 24th overall pick
- Drafted by: Utah Jazz
- Playing career: 1998–2016
- Position: Point guard
- Number: 24

Career history
- 1998–2000: DKV Joventut
- 2000–2002: Real Madrid
- 2002–2005: Utah Jazz
- 2005–2006: Akasvayu Girona
- 2006–2009: Real Madrid
- 2009–2011: Khimki Moscow Region
- 2011–2016: Bilbao Basket

Career highlights
- Liga ACB champion (2007); ULEB Cup champion (2007)
- Stats at NBA.com
- Stats at Basketball Reference
Medals
Representing Spain
Men's basketball
Summer Olympics
Silver medal – second place	2008 Beijing	Team
EuroBasket
Bronze medal – third place	2001 Turkey
Gold medal – first place	2009 Poland

Raül López Molist (born 15 April 1980) is a Spanish former professional basketball player. He played for the Utah Jazz of the National Basketball Association (NBA). López is a native of Vic, Barcelona, in Catalonia, Spain. At a height of 6 ft 0 in (1.83 m) tall, he played at the point guard position. López was featured on the Spanish version of the NBA Live 2004 video game.

== Player profile ==
Although López was said by some to have been the Spanish version of John Stockton, his game was often described as more similar to that of Steve Nash and Tony Parker. He was known for his quickness, court vision, unselfishness, and passing ability. Also, he had the ability to create his own shot, which was a key skill in the modern NBA and EuroLeague.

== Professional career ==
=== Europe ===
In 1998, at 18 years old, López began his professional career with Joventut Badalona in the Spanish ACB League. In 2000, he was signed by Real Madrid where he played for two seasons. Later, during the summer of 2005, he signed with the Spanish local team Akasvayu Girona, which finished 7th at the end of the 2005–06 ACB season.

=== NBA ===
In 2001, López was selected in the first round of the 2001 NBA draft, 24th overall, by the Utah Jazz. In September 2002, he signed his NBA rookie contract with the Utah Jazz and underwent surgery to repair the torn anterior cruciate ligament in his right knee, missing the entire 2002–03 NBA season. Finally, in the 2003–04 season, totally recovered from his knee injury, he played in all of the 82 regular season games as the backup to starting point guard Carlos Arroyo, while averaging 7.0 points, 3.7 assists and 1.9 rebounds in 19.7 minutes per game.

On 3 August 2005 López was traded from the Jazz to the Memphis Grizzlies as part of the largest trade in NBA history, involving five teams, 13 players, and two draft picks. He was subsequently cut from the Memphis Grizzlies 2005–06 roster.

Lopez' final NBA game was played on 15 February 2005 in a 95 - 102 loss to the Los Angeles Lakers. In that game, Lopez played 12 minutes as the Jazz' starting Point Guard and recorded 7 points, 1 assist and 1 rebound.

=== Return to Europe ===
López returned to Real Madrid after signing a contract in July 2006. In 2009, he moved to the VTB United League club Khimki Moscow Region. In July 2011, he returned to Spain, and signed a two-year contract with Bilbao Basket.

On 3 March 2016, López announced that he would to retire from playing basketball at the end of the 2015–16 ACB season.

== National team career ==
=== Spanish junior national team ===
López was a member of the Spain junior national teams that won gold medals at the 1998 FIBA Europe Under-18 Championship and the 1999 FIBA Under-19 World Championship.

=== Spanish senior national team ===
López was named, along with Juan Carlos Navarro, to the senior Spain national basketball team that participated at the 2000 Summer Olympics in Sydney, Australia. He also won the bronze medal at the EuroBasket 2001. However, before playing for Spain at the 2002 FIBA World Championship, he suffered an injury to his right knee, the same one that occurred during the 2001–02 season, while he was playing with Real Madrid.

He also won the silver medal at the 2008 Summer Olympics, and the gold medal at the EuroBasket 2009.

== Career statistics ==
=== Domestic leagues ===
Season	Team	League	GP	MPG	FG%	3P%	FT%	RPG	APG	SPG	BPG	PPG
1997–98	DKV Joventut	Liga ACB	1	18.0	1.000	1.000	.500	2.0	4.0	1.0	.0	10.0
1998–99	DKV Joventut	Liga ACB	34	14.7	.386	.400	.754	1.2	1.6	.8	.0	4.4
1999–00	DKV Joventut	Liga ACB	32	23.7	.515	.380	.836	1.6	2.8	1.2	.0	10.1
2000–01	Real Madrid	Liga ACB	43	21.1	.545	.412	.784	1.7	2.4	.9	.0	7.7
2001–02	Real Madrid	Liga ACB	14	21.1	.517	.227	.788	3.1	3.1	1.5	.0	8.3
2005–06	Akasvayu Girona	Liga ACB	37	24.2	.555	.442	.786	1.6	2.8	1.2	.0	10.2
2006–07	Real Madrid	Liga ACB	43	22.4	.437	.319	.863	2.0	3.7	1.0	.0	5.8
2007–08	Real Madrid	Liga ACB	34	21.0	.575	.435	.942	1.4	2.5	1.1	.0	8.1
2008–09	Real Madrid	Liga ACB	32	22.8	.469	.430	.860	1.6	3.5	1.0	.0	7.0
2009–10	Khimki	Superleague A	31	18.4	.377	.403	.875	2.1	3.0	.7	.0	5.2
2009–10	Khimki	VTB United League	8	17.9	.444	.409	1.000	1.9	2.6	.9	.0	4.6
2010–11	Khimki	Russian PBL	39	17.1	.556	.346	.881	1.9	2.1	.8	.0	5.1
2010–11	Khimki	VTB United League	11	17.2	.500	.619	.538	1.9	1.8	.6	.1	5.6
2011–12	Bilbao Basket	Liga ACB	35	15.1	.500	.453	.844	1.3	1.5	1.0	.0	6.3
2012–13	Bilbao Basket	Liga ACB	29	20.9	.479	.256	1.000	1.5	2.7	1.1	.0	5.8
2013–14	Bilbao Basket	Liga ACB	27	25.0	.549	.350	.935	2.2	3.3	1.1	.0	8.4
2014–15	Bilbao Basket	Liga ACB	36	18.9	.521	.310	.889	1.3	2.7	.7	.0	8.0
