= Borja Mendía =

Spanish basketball player

Zornotza ST
- Position: Small forward
- League: LEB Plata

Personal information
- Born: 10 November 1994 (age 32) Bilbao, Spain
- Listed height: 6 ft 6 in (1.98 m)
- Listed weight: 196 lb (89 kg)

Career information
- Playing career: 2013–present

Career history
- 2013–2018: Bilbao Basket
- 2013–2015: → Zornotza ST
- 2018–2019: Real Canoe
- 2019–present: Zornotza ST

Borja Mendía Sangroniz (born 10 November 1994) is a Spanish professional basketball player for Zornotza ST of the LEB Plata.

== Professional career ==
Mendía began his professional career in the Bilbao Basket in 2013, on loan to Zornotza ST during the 2013–14 season and the 2014–15 season.

== Career statistics ==
Legend
GP	Games played	GS	Games started	MPG	Minutes per game
FG%	Field-goal percentage	3P%	3-point field-goal percentage	FT%	Free-throw percentage
RPG	Rebounds per game	APG	Assists per game	SPG	Steals per game
BPG	Blocks per game	PPG	Points per game	PIR	Performance index rating
**Bold**	Career high

=== Domestic leagues ===
Year	Team	GP	GS	MPG	FG%	3P%	FT%	RPG	APG	SPG	BPG	PPG	PIR
2014–15	Bilbao	10	1	2.0	.200	.000	.500	.2	.1	.2	.0	.3	–0.7
