= Álex Suárez (basketball) =

Spanish basketball player (born 1993)

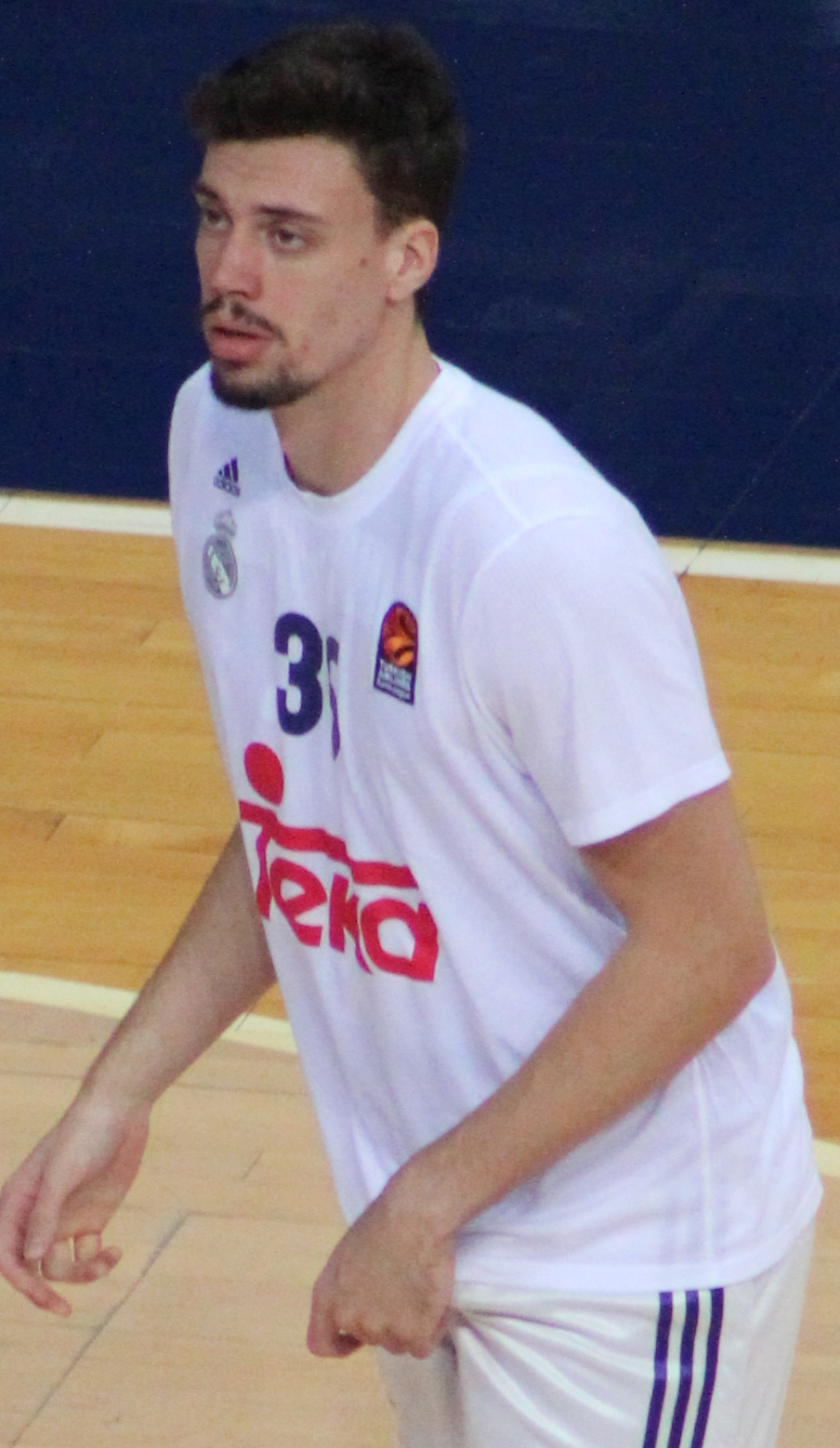
- Suárez in 2016

Personal information
- Born: September 27, 1993 (age 33) Mahón, Menorca, Spain
- Listed height: 6 ft 9 in (2.06 m)
- Listed weight: 223 lb (101 kg)

Career information
- Playing career: 2011–present
- Position: Power forward

Career history
- 2011–2015: Joventut Badalona
- 2011–2013: →Prat
- 2015–2018: Real Madrid
- 2015–2016: →Bilbao
- 2017–2018: →Zaragoza
- 2018–2019: Benfica
- 2019–2020: Canarias
- 2020–2024: Obradoiro
- 2024–2025: Real Betis Baloncesto

Career highlights
- FIBA Intercontinental Cup champion (2020); Spanish Cup champion (2017)

Alejandro Suárez Castro (born 27 September 1993) is a Spanish former professional basketball player. He played as a power forward.

== Professional career ==
Suárez began his career in the junior team of Joventut, playing with them in the seasons of 2009–10 and 2010–11. In 2011, he was loaned out to CB Prat, the reserve team of Joventut. Over the 2014–15 season, he averaged 4.8 points in 34 games for the former. In 2015, Real Madrid paid the termination clause in his contract, and he signed a three-year contract with them. On 13 August 2015, he was loaned to Dominion Bilbao Basket. On 16 August 2017, he was loaned out to Tecnyconta Zaragoza.

On July 31, 2018, Suárez signed with Portuguese club Benfica.

On August 7, 2019, Suárez signed by Tenerife. He averaged 2.7 points and 1.4 rebounds per game. He signed with Monbus Obradoiro on July 27, 2020. Suárez signed a three-year extension with the team on October 4, 2021.

On August 6, 2024, he signed with Real Betis Baloncesto of the LEB Oro.

On February 4, 2026, he announced his retirement.
