= 2015–16 Euroleague regular season =

The 2015–16 Euroleague Regular Season was played from 15 October to 18 December 2015. A total of 24 teams competed in the group stage to decide the 16 places in the Top 16.

== Format ==
In each group, teams played against each other home-and-away in a round-robin format. The matchdays were 15–16 October, 22–23 October, 29–30 October, 5–6 November, 12–13 November, 19–20 November, 26–27 November, 3–4 December, 10–11 December and 17–18 December 2015.

The four first qualified teams advanced to the Top 16, while the fifth and the sixth-placed teams entered the Eurocup Last 32.

A total of 12 countries were represented in the group stage. Pınar Karşıyaka and Darüşşafaka Doğuş made their debut appearances in the group stage of the modern era of Euroleague Basketball.

=== Tiebreakers ===
If teams are level on record at the end of the Regular Season, tiebreakers are applied in the following order:

1. Head-to-head record.
2. Head-to-head point differential.
3. Point differential during the Regular Season.
4. Points scored during the regular season.
5. Sum of quotients of points scored and points allowed in each Regular Season match.

== Groups ==
=== Group A ===
Pos	Team	Pld	W	L	PF	PA	PD	Qualification
1	(Turkey) Fenerbahçe	10	8	2	770	707	+63	Advance to Top 16
2	(Russia) Khimki	10	5	5	798	740	+58	Advance to Top 16
3	(Serbia) Crvena Zvezda Telekom	10	5	5	766	813	−47	Advance to Top 16
4	(Spain) Real Madrid	10	5	5	854	808	+46	Advance to Top 16
5	(Germany) Bayern Munich	10	4	6	763	780	−17	Transfer to Eurocup
6	(France) Strasbourg	10	3	7	711	814	−103	Transfer to Eurocup

Source: Euroleague

15 October 2015	Crvena zvezda Telekom (Serbia)	81–59	(France) Strasbourg	Belgrade, Serbia
19:00 (CEST)	Scoring by quarter: 19−20, 24−12, 19−16, 19−11
	Pts: Zirbes 18; Rebs: Zirbes 7 Asts: Mekel, Jović 5 PIR: Zirbes 22	Boxscore	Pts: Beaubois 17; Rebs: Leloup 6 Asts: Lacombe 4 PIR: Beaubois 16	Arena: Kombank Arena; Attendance: 14,338; Referees: Daniel Hierrezuelo (ESP), Jakub Zamojski (POL), Aare Halliko (EST)

16 October 2015	Fenerbahçe (Turkey)	74–67	(Germany) Bayern Munich	Istanbul, Turkey
18:45 (CEST)	Scoring by quarter: 10–20, 20–19, 22–20, 22–8
	Pts: Datome 15; Rebs: Veselý 11; Asts: Veselý 5 PIR: Veselý 23	Boxscore	Pts: Renfroe, Đedović 14; Rebs: Bryant 7 Asts: Renfroe 4 PIR: Đedović 17	Arena: Ülker Sports Arena; Attendance: 10,085; Referees: Christos Christodoulou (GRE), Matej Boltauzer (SLO), Piotr Pastusiak (POL)

16 October 2015	Khimki (Russia)	84–70	(Spain) Real Madrid	Khimki, Russia
19:00 (CEST)	Scoring by quarter: 21–14, 22–18, 18–17, 23–21
	Pts: Todorović 15; Rebs: Rice, Todorović 8 Asts: Augustine 4 PIR: Todorović 22	Boxscore	Pts: Llull 20; Rebs: Ayón 7 Asts: three players 3 PIR: Llull 19	Arena: Basketball Center of Moscow Region; Attendance: 3,507; Referees: Sreten Radović (CRO), Damir Javor (SLO), Marcin Kowalski (POL)

22 October 2015	Bayern Munich (Germany)	69–60	(Russia) Khimki	Munich, Germany
20:45 (CEST)	Scoring by quarter: 22–16, 23–15, 14–20, 10–9
	Pts: Đedović 16; Rebs: Renfroe 11; Asts: Renfroe 5 PIR: Đedović 24	Boxscore	Pts: Shved 16; Rebs: Augustine 12; Asts: Rice 6 PIR: Augustine 24	Arena: Audi Dome; Attendance: 5,869; Referees: Juan Carlos García González (ESP), Panagiotis Anastopoulos (GRE), Sašo Petek (SLO)

22 October 2015	Real Madrid (Spain)	98–71	(Serbia) Crvena zvezda Telekom	Madrid, Spain
22:00 (CEST)	Scoring by quarter: 22–6, 34–14, 26–21, 16–30
	Pts: Carroll 19; Rebs: Reyes 8 Asts: Rodríguez 11; PIR: Ayón 26	Boxscore	Pts: Zirbes 15; Rebs: Zirbes 6 Asts: Jović 9 PIR: Jović 20	Arena: Barclaycard Center; Attendance: 11,486; Referees: Fernando Rocha (POR), Spiros Gkontas (GRE), David Romano (ISR)

23 October 2015	Strasbourg (France)	91–70	(Turkey) Fenerbahçe	Strasbourg, France
20:45 (CEST)	Scoring by quarter: 21–24, 28–17, 16–17, 26–12
	Pts: Weems 22; Rebs: Golubović 7 Asts: Campbell 7 PIR: Weems 24	Boxscore	Pts: Bogdanović 12; Rebs: Datome, Veselý 5 Asts: Dixon 5 PIR: Antić 15	Arena: Rhénus Sport; Attendance: 6,112; Referees: Miguel Ángel Pérez Pérez (ESP), Srđan Dožai (CRO), Petar Obradović (BIH)

30 October 2015	Khimki (Russia)	91–53	(Serbia) Crvena zvezda Telekom	Moscow, Russia
17:30 (CET)	Scoring by quarter: 22–17, 29–13, 20–9, 20–14
	Pts: Augustine 14; Rebs: three players 5 Asts: Shved 7 PIR: Augustine 25	Boxscore	Pts: Zirbes 15; Rebs: Zirbes 14; Asts: Mekel 4 PIR: Zirbes 18	Arena: Krylatskoye Sports Palace; Attendance: 2,000; Referees: Robert Lottermoser (GER), Elias Koromilas (GRE), Tomislav Hordov (CRO)

30 October 2015	Bayern Munich (Germany)	76–61	(France) Strasbourg	Munich, Germany
20:00 (CET)	Scoring by quarter: 18–12, 13–17, 23–18, 22–14
	Pts: Đedović 22; Rebs: Renfroe, Savanović 7 Asts: Renfroe, Đedović 6 PIR: Đedović 23	Boxscore	Pts: Golubović 22; Rebs: Golubović, Travis 6 Asts: Collins 7 PIR: Golubović 23	Arena: Audi Dome; Attendance: 6,344; Referees: Vicente Bultó (ESP), Carmelo Paternicò (ITA), Anastasios Piloidis (GRE)

30 October 2015	Fenerbahçe (Turkey)	77–66	(Spain) Real Madrid	Istanbul, Turkey
20:45 (CET)	Scoring by quarter: 20–18, 19–14, 24–24, 14–10
	Pts: Udoh, Datome 15; Rebs: Udoh 6 Asts: Sloukas 6 PIR: Bogdanović 16	Boxscore	Pts: Reyes 15; Rebs: Ayón 10; Asts: Llull 5 PIR: Reyes 19	Arena: Ülker Sports Arena; Attendance: 12,886; Referees: Luigi Lamonica (ITA), Milivoje Jovčić (SRB), Siniša Herceg (CRO)

5 November 2015	Khimki (Russia)	88–62	(France) Strasbourg	Moscow, Russia
17:00 (CET)	Scoring by quarter: 23–15, 16–11, 25–14, 24–22
	Pts: Rice, Shved 16; Rebs: Honeycutt 8 Asts: Rice 6 PIR: Honeycutt, Davis 17	Boxscore	Pts: Collins 14; Rebs: Golubović 7 Asts: Campbell 5 PIR: Collins 15	Arena: Krylatskoye Sports Palace; Attendance: 1,500; Referees: Ilija Belošević (SRB), Carlos Cortés (ESP), Ersan Kartal (TUR)

5 November 2015	Real Madrid (Spain)	101–99	(Germany) Bayern Munich	Madrid, Spain
20:45 (CET)	Scoring by quarter: 33–20, 18–31, 22–30, 28–18
	Pts: Fernández, Reyes 20; Rebs: Reyes 11; Asts: Rodríguez 7 PIR: Reyes 30	Boxscore	Pts: Đedović 22; Rebs: Taylor 6 Asts: Gavel; PIR: Đedović 20	Arena: Barclaycard Center; Attendance: 9,037; Referees: Elias Koromilas (GRE), Jakub Zamojski (POL), Tolga Sahin (ITA)

6 November 2015	Crvena zvezda Telekom (Serbia)	60–74	(Turkey) Fenerbahçe	Belgrade, Serbia
20:00 (CET)	Scoring by quarter: 19–25, 12–20, 11–14, 18–15
	Pts: Štimac 13; Rebs: Štimac 7 Asts: Lazić, Jović 4 PIR: Zirbes, Štimac 12	Boxscore	Pts: Antić 14; Rebs: Antić 7 Asts: Sloukas 3 PIR: Udoh 19	Arena: Kombank Arena; Attendance: 16,203; Referees: Emilio Pérez Pizarro (ESP), Joseph Bissang (FRA), Petros Papapetrou (GRE)

12 November 2015	Bayern Munich (Germany)	79–90	(Serbia) Crvena zvezda Telekom	Munich, Germany
20:45 (CET)	Scoring by quarter: 19–19, 24–19, 23–25, 13–27
	Pts: Savanović 19; Rebs: Savanović, Taylor 5 Asts: Renfroe, Gavel 4 PIR: Savanović 19	Boxscore	Pts: Miller 22; Rebs: Miller 6 Asts: Jović 19; PIR: Jović 25	Arena: Audi Dome; Attendance: 6,171; Referees: Luigi Lamonica (ITA), Antonio Conde (ESP), Jurgis Laurinavičius (LTU)

13 November 2015	Strasbourg (France)	93–86	(Spain) Real Madrid	Strasbourg, France
20:30 (CET)	Scoring by quarter: 24–25, 27–19, 27–19, 15–23
	Pts: Campbell 23; Rebs: Travis 5 Asts: Beaubois 6 PIR: Beaubois, Campbell 19	Boxscore	Pts: Taylor 21; Rebs: Reyes 7 Asts: Llull 6 PIR: Llull 25	Arena: Rhénus Sport; Attendance: 6,167; Referees: Damir Javor (SLO), Panagioutis Anastopoulos (GRE), Tomislav Hordov (CRO)

13 November 2015	Fenerbahçe (Turkey)	88–83	(Russia) Khimki	Istanbul, Turkey
20:45 (CET)	Scoring by quarter: 23–21, 26–20, 15–18, 24–24
	Pts: Datome 19; Rebs: Vaselý 9 Asts: Sloukas 6 PIR: Datome 20	Boxscore	Pts: Shved 19; Rebs: Augustine 7 Asts: Koponen 6 PIR: Davis 24	Arena: Ülker Sports Arena; Attendance: 10,879; Referees: Daniel Hierrezuelo (ESP), Carmelo Paternico (ITA), Miloš Koljenšić (MNE)

18 November 2015	Real Madrid (Spain)	82–85	(Russia) Khimki	Madrid, Spain
20:45 (CET)	Scoring by quarter: 22–24, 20–20, 21–22, 19–19
	Pts: Rodríguez 17; Rebs: Ayón 15; Asts: Fernández 4 PIR: Ayón 30	Boxscore	Pts: Rice 18; Rebs: Davis 10; Asts: Rice 8 PIR: Davis 16	Arena: Barclaycard Center; Attendance: 9,310; Referees: Saša Pukl (SLO), Eddie Viator (FRA), Piotr Pastusiak (POL)

19 November 2015	Bayern Munich (Germany)	67–84	(Turkey) Fenerbahçe	Munich, Germany
20:00 (CET)	Scoring by quarter: 10–30, 20–20, 18–17, 19–17
	Pts: Đedović 16; Rebs: Bryant 9 Asts: Bryant 4 PIR: Zipser 12	Boxscore	Pts: Dixon 25; Rebs: Udoh 6 Asts: Datome 6 PIR: Dixon 29	Arena: Audi Dome; Attendance: 6,494; Referees: Fernando Rocha (POR), Carlos Cortés (ESP), Tomas Jasevičius (LTU)

19 November 2015	Strasbourg (France)	78–75	(Serbia) Crvena zvezda Telekom	Strasbourg, France
20:30 (CET)	Scoring by quarter: 19–30, 15–22, 22–12, 22–11
	Pts: Leloup 24; Rebs: Leloup 8 Asts: three players 3 PIR: Leloup 26	Boxscore	Pts: Miller 23; Rebs: Miller 12; Asts: Jović 10; PIR: Miller 32	Arena: Rhénus Sport; Attendance: 5,318; Referees: Daniel Hierrezuelo (ESP), Jakub Zamojski (POL), Miloš Koljenšić (MNE)

26 November 2015	Khimki (Russia)	70–81	(Germany) Bayern Munich	Moscow, Russia
17:30 (CET)	Scoring by quarter: 14–23, 16–19, 21–17, 19–22
	Pts: Augustine 14; Rebs: Augustine 8 Asts: Koponen, Shved 4 PIR: Augustine 23	Boxscore	Pts: Bryant 17; Rebs: Đedović 8 Asts: Gavel 6 PIR: Bryant 23	Arena: Krylatskoye Sports Palace; Attendance: 2,000; Referees: Miguel Ángel Pérez Pérez (ESP), Oļegs Latiševs (LAT), David Romano (ISR)

26 November 2015	Fenerbahçe (Turkey)	81–64	(France) Strasbourg	Istanbul, Turkey
19:00 (CET)	Scoring by quarter: 22–14, 18–20, 21–13, 20–17
	Pts: Vaselý 20; Rebs: Antić 6 Asts: Datome 5 PIR: Vaselý 25	Boxscore	Pts: three players 14; Rebs: Golubović 7 Asts: Collins 4 PIR: Golubović 17	Arena: Ülker Sports Arena; Attendance: 8,212; Referees: Christos Christodoulou (GRE), Juan Carlos García González, (ESP), Piotr Pastusiak (POL)

27 November 2015	Crvena zvezda Telekom (Serbia)	94–88	(Spain) Real Madrid	Belgrade, Serbia
20:00 (CET)	Scoring by quarter: 28–18, 18–25, 20–24, 28–21
	Pts: Zirbes 26; Rebs: Miller 7 Asts: three players 4 PIR: Zirbes 32	Boxscore	Pts: Ayón, Rodríguez 16; Rebs: Ayón 7 Asts: Rodríguez 9 PIR: Rodríguez 31	Arena: Pionir; Attendance: 6,744; Referees: Robert Lottermosser (GER), Carmelo Paternico (ITA), Seffi Shemmesh (ISR)

3 December 2015	Real Madrid (Spain)	80–73	(Turkey) Fenerbahçe	Madrid, Spain
20:45 (CET)	Scoring by quarter: 18–28, 18–17, 20–10, 24–18
	Pts: Llull 17; Rebs: Reyes, Hernangómez 6 Asts: Llull 4 PIR: Ayón 19	Boxscore	Pts: Veselý 20; Rebs: Veselý 8 Asts: Sloukas 6 PIR: Veselý 22	Arena: Barclaycard Center; Attendance: 10,483; Referees: Sreten Radović (CRO), Elias Koromilas (GRE), Jakub Zamojski (POL)

4 December 2015	Crvena zvezda Telekom (Serbia)	96–91	(Russia) Khimki	Belgrade, Serbia
20:00 (CET)	Scoring by quarter: 27–26, 23–27, 18–16, 28–22
	Pts: Zirbes 27; Rebs: Miller, Zirbes 7 Asts: Jović 6 PIR: Zirbes 33	Boxscore	Pts: Shved 28; Rebs: Dragić 8 Asts: Shved 6 PIR: Shved 33	Arena: Pionir; Attendance: 6,934; Referees: Fernando Rocha (POR), Boris Shulga (UKR), Clemens Fritz (GER)

4 December 2015	Strasbourg (France)	69–82	(Germany) Bayern Munich	Strasbourg, France
20:30 (CET)	Scoring by quarter: 15–21, 14–27, 11–18, 29–16
	Pts: Leloup 11; Rebs: Fofana 9 Asts: Lacombe, Leloup 5 PIR: Fofana, Lacombe 16	Boxscore	Pts: John Bryant 17; Rebs: Savanović 10; Asts: Renfroe 7 PIR: Thompson 20	Arena: Rhénus Sport; Attendance: 6,141; Referees: Carmelo Paternico (ITA), Benjamín Jiménez (ESP), Robert Vyklický (CZE)

11 December 2015	Bayern Munich (Germany)	67–86	(Spain) Real Madrid	Munich, Germany
20:00 (CET)	Scoring by quarter: 18–20, 20–16, 13–29, 16–21
	Pts: Rivers 22; Rebs: Savanović 8 Asts: Gavel 5 PIR: Rivers 17	Boxscore	Pts: Ayón 22; Rebs: Ayón 9 Asts: Rodríguez 10; PIR: Ayón 41	Arena: Audi Dome; Attendance: 6,700; Referees: Christos Christodoulou (GRE), Matej Boltauzer (SLO), Tolga Sahin (ITA)

11 December 2015	Strasbourg (France)	69–78	(Russia) Khimki	Strasbourg, France
20:30 (CET)	Scoring by quarter: 24–20, 19–25, 14–14, 12–19
	Pts: Weems 14; Rebs: three players 5 Asts: Lacombe, Campbell 5 PIR: Weems 12	Boxscore	Pts: Shved 23; Rebs: Honeycutt 19; Asts: Rice, Honeycutt 4 PIR: Honeycutt 33	Arena: Rhénus Sport; Attendance: 5,398; Referees: Robert Lottermoser (GER), Elias Koromilas (GRE), Amit Balak (ISR)

11 December 2015	Fenerbahçe (Turkey)	79–61	(Serbia) Crvena zvezda Telekom	Istanbul, Turkey
20:45 (CET)	Scoring by quarter: 18–20, 21–17, 19–14, 21–10
	Pts: Udoh 13; Rebs: Datome 8 Asts: Sloukas 7 PIR: Udoh, Datome 19	Boxscore	Pts: Simonović 15; Rebs: Miller 11; Asts: Williams 10; PIR: Štimac 11	Arena: Ülker Sports Arena; Attendance: 8,634; Referees: Luigi Lamonica (ITA), Benjamin Jimenez (ESP), Jurgis Laurinavicius (LTU)

17 December 2015	Khimki (Russia)	68–70	(Turkey) Fenerbahçe	Khimki, Russia
17:30 (CET)	Scoring by quarter: 26–24, 13–15, 10–11, 19–20
	Pts: Rice 19; Rebs: Augustine 8 Asts: Rice 3 PIR: Dragić 18	Boxscore	Pts: Veselý 19; Rebs: Veselý 6 Asts: Bogdanović, Dixon 5 PIR: Veselý 23	Arena: Basketball Center of Moscow Region; Attendance: 3,300; Referees: Damir Javor (SLO), Carmelo Paternico (ITA), Carlos Peruga (ESP)

17 December 2015	Real Madrid (Spain)	97–65	(France) Strasbourg	Madrid, Spain
20:45 (CET)	Scoring by quarter: 29–15, 23–22, 23–13, 22–15
	Pts: Taylor 16; Rebs: Reyes 7 Asts: Dončić 7 PIR: Reyes 18	Boxscore	Pts: Beaubois 17; Rebs: Golubović 9 Asts: Campbell 5 PIR: Golubović 12	Arena: Barclaycard Center; Attendance: 10,868; Referees: Luigi Lamonica (ITA), Oļegs Latiševs (LAT), Ioannis Foufis (GRE)

18 December 2015	Crvena zvezda Telekom (Serbia)	85–76	(Germany) Bayern Munich	Belgrade, Serbia
19:00 (CET)	Scoring by quarter: 31–20, 13–20, 12–25, 29–11
	Pts: Miller 21; Rebs: Miller 10; Asts: Jović 13; PIR: Zirbes 31	Boxscore	Pts: Savanović 19; Rebs: Savanović 6 Asts: Gavel 6 PIR: Savanović 19	Arena: Pionir Hall; Attendance: 6,458; Referees: Eddie Viator (FRA), Spiros Gkontas (GRE), Vicente Bultó (ESP)

=== Group B ===
Pos	Team	Pld	W	L	PF	PA	PD	Qualification
1	(Greece) Olympiacos	10	8	2	761	692	+69	Advance to Top 16
2	(Turkey) Anadolu Efes	10	6	4	863	805	+58	Advance to Top 16
3	(Spain) Laboral Kutxa	10	6	4	854	766	+88	Advance to Top 16
4	(Croatia) Cedevita	10	4	6	750	780	−30	Advance to Top 16
5	(France) Limoges	10	3	7	698	823	−125	Transfer to Eurocup
6	(Italy) EA7 Emporio Armani Milan	10	3	7	737	797	−60	Transfer to Eurocup

Source: Euroleague

15 October 2015	Olympiacos (Greece)	76–61	(Croatia) Cedevita	Heraklion, Greece
20:45 (CEST)	Scoring by quarter: 21−20, 17−15, 19−13, 19−13
	Pts: Printezis 20; Rebs: Lojeski 10; Asts: Spanoulis 7 PIR: Young 26	Boxscore	Pts: Pullen 18; Rebs: Zubčić 6 Asts: four players 3 PIR: Zubčić 20	Arena: Heraklion Arena; Attendance: 5,006; Referees: Miguel Ángel Pérez Pérez (ESP), Carmelo Paternico (ITA), Marek Ćmikiewicz (POL)

16 October 2015	Limoges (France)	77–89	(Turkey) Anadolu Efes	Limoges, France
20:45 (CEST)	Scoring by quarter: 17–30, 20–17, 19–21, 21–21
	Pts: Schaffartzik 20; Rebs: Traore 6 Asts: Schaffartzik 5 PIR: Schaffartzik 26	Boxscore	Pts: Diebler; Rebs: Granger 7 Asts: Heurtel 15; PIR: Heurtel 21	Arena: Beaublanc; Attendance: 4,871; Referees: Saša Pukl (SLO), Spiros Gkontas (GRE), Miloš Koljenšić (MNE)

16 October 2015	EA7 Emporio Armani Milan (Italy)	78–76	(Spain) Laboral Kutxa	Milan, Italy
20:45 (CEST)	Scoring by quarter: 17–23, 21–13, 23–10, 17–30
	Pts: McLean 13; Rebs: Hummel 8 Asts: Gentile 6 PIR: McLean 19	Boxscore	Pts: James, Bourousis 13; Rebs: Bourousis 8 Asts: James 5 PIR: Bourousis 15	Arena: Mediolanum Forum; Attendance: 7,208; Referees: Ilija Belošević (SRB), Elias Koromilas (GRE), Joseph Bissang (FRA)

22 October 2015	Anadolu Efes (Turkey)	89–73	(Italy) EA7 Emporio Armani Milan	Istanbul, Turkey
19:00 (CEST)	Scoring by quarter: 21–20, 22–22, 26–21, 20–10
	Pts: Diebler 17; Rebs: Dunston 6 Asts: Granger, Heurtel 8 PIR: Diebler 22	Boxscore	Pts: Gentile 22; Rebs: Mačvan 9 Asts: Lafayette 6 PIR: Mačvan 28	Arena: Abdi İpekçi Arena; Attendance: 5,317; Referees: Robert Lottermosser (GER), Eddie Viator (FRA), Carlos Peruga (ESP)

22 October 2015	Cedevita (Croatia)	80–84	(France) Limoges	Zagreb, Croatia
19:30 (CEST)	Scoring by quarter: 19–27, 13–17, 22–15, 26–25
	Pts: Pullen 21; Rebs: Bilan 9 Asts: Gordić, Pullen 4 PIR: Pullen 25	Boxscore	Pts: Boungou Colo, Westermann 15; Rebs: Boungou Colo 7 Asts: Schaffartzik 7 PIR: Boungou Colo 25	Arena: Dražen Petrović Zagreb; Attendance: 2,556; Referees: Emilio Pérez Pizarro (ESP), Ioannis Foufis (GRE), Sergey Zashchuk (UKR)

23 October 2015	Laboral Kutxa (Spain)	96–89(OT)	(Greece) Olympiacos	Vitoria-Gasteiz, Spain
20:30 (CEST)	Scoring by quarter: 21–18, 27–21, 21–24, 11–17, Overtime: 16–9
	Pts: Bourousis 28; Rebs: Bourousis 12; Asts: Adams 7 PIR: Bourousis 44	Boxscore	Pts: Lojeski 28; Rebs: Printezis 8 Asts: Spanoulis 9 PIR: Lojeski 32	Arena: Fernando Buesa Arena; Attendance: 10,826; Referees: Boris Ryzhyk (UKR), Tolga Sahin (ITA), Milija Vojinović (SRB)

29 October 2015	Limoges (France)	71–107	(Spain) Laboral Kutxa	Limoges, France
20:30 (CET)	Scoring by quarter: 12–26, 22–34, 21–18, 16–29
	Pts: Culpepper 13; Rebs: Traoré 6 Asts: Culpepper, Westermann 5 PIR: Traoré, Westermann 13	Boxscore	Pts: Adams 18; Rebs: Tillie 5 Asts: Adams 9 PIR: Adams 29	Arena: Beaublanc; Attendance: 4,886; Referees: Damir Javor (SLO), Panagiotis Anastopoulos (GRE), Srđan Dožai (CRO)

29 October 2015	Anadolu Efes (Turkey)	75–81	(Croatia) Cedevita	Istanbul, Turkey
20:45 (CET)	Scoring by quarter: 25–21, 16–15, 17–18, 17–27
	Pts: Diebler 15; Rebs: Granger 7 Asts: Granger 7 PIR: Dunston 16	Boxscore	Pts: Bilan 20; Rebs: Bilan 10; Asts: Babić 5 PIR: Babić 24	Arena: Abdi İpekçi Arena; Attendance: 3,659; Referees: Daniel Hierrezuelo (ESP), Boris Shulga (UKR), Sašo Petek (SLO)

30 October 2015	EA7 Emporio Armani Milan (Italy)	66–71	(Greece) Olympiacos	Milan, Italy
20:45 (CET)	Scoring by quarter: 23–20, 14–19, 17–13, 12–19
	Pts: Gentile 24; Rebs: Lawal 6 Asts: Gentile 7 PIR: Gentile 23	Boxscore	Pts: Young 18; Rebs: Printezis 6 Asts: Spanoulis 4 PIR: Young 23	Arena: Mediolanum Forum; Attendance: 11,192; Referees: Matej Boltauzer (SLO), Jakub Zamojski (POL), Marko Juras (SRB)

5 November 2015	EA7 Emporio Armani Milan (Italy)	68–77	(Croatia) Cedevita	Milan, Italy
20:45 (CET)	Scoring by quarter: 11–21, 19–14, 20–14, 18–28
	Pts: Gentile 19; Rebs: McLean 10; Asts: Hummel 4 PIR: Simon 17	Boxscore	Pts: Bilan 16; Rebs: White 7 Asts: Babić 5 PIR: Bilan 20	Arena: Mediolanum Forum; Attendance: 7,174; Referees: Christos Christodoulou (GRE), Vicente Bultó (ESP), Ilya Putenko (RUS)

5 November 2015	Laboral Kutxa (Spain)	92–90(OT)	(Turkey) Anadolu Efes	Vitoria-Gasteiz, Spain
20:45 (CET)	Scoring by quarter: 16–18, 12–15, 24–24, 29–24, Overtime: 11–9
	Pts: Bourousis 18; Rebs: Bourousis 11; Asts: Hanga 3 PIR: Bourousis 29	Boxscore	Pts: Heurtel 26; Rebs: Dunston 8 Asts: Heurtel 6 PIR: Heurtel 27	Arena: Fernando Buesa Arena; Attendance: 8,366; Referees: Fernando Rocha (POR), Oļegs Latiševs (LAT), Saverio Lanzarini (ITA)

5 November 2015	Olympiacos (Greece)	75–49	(France) Limoges	Piraeus, Greece
20:45 (CET)	Scoring by quarter: 16–17, 12–12, 23–13, 24–7
	Pts: Printezis 15; Rebs: Young 10; Asts: Spanoulis 10; PIR: Young 28	Boxscore	Pts: Culpepper 10; Rebs: Traoré 6 Asts: Schaffartzik, Westermann 3 PIR: Zerbo 7	Arena: Peace and Friendship Stadium; Attendance: 7,243; Referees: Juan Carlos García González (ESP), Sašo Petek (SLO), Aare Halliko (EST)

12 November 2015	Limoges (France)	74–65	(Italy) EA7 Emporio Armani Milan	Boulazac, France
20:30 (CET)	Scoring by quarter: 19–21, 20–9, 17–16, 18–19
	Pts: Boungou Colo 18; Rebs: Traoré 7 Asts: Westermann 7 PIR: Boungou Colo 28	Boxscore	Pts: Gentile 19; Rebs: McLean 5 Asts: Gentile 3 PIR: Gentile 19	Arena: Le Palio; Attendance: 3,446; Referees: Milivoje Jovčić (SRB), Benjamín Jiménez (ESP), Piotr Pastusiak (POL)

12 November 2015	Anadolu Efes (Turkey)	87–91(OT)	(Greece) Olympiacos	Istanbul, Turkey
19:00 (CET)	Scoring by quarter: 13–20, 17–16, 24–18, 22–22, Overtime: 11–15
	Pts: Granger 26; Rebs: Šarić 10; Asts: Heurtel 6 PIR: Granger 24	Boxscore	Pts: Printezis 17; Rebs: Lojeski 7 Asts: Hackett 2 PIR: Hackett 21	Arena: Abdi İpekçi Arena; Attendance: 8,165; Referees: Saša Pukl (SLO), Carlos Cortés (ESP), Sergey Zashchuk (UKR)

13 November 2015	Cedevita (Croatia)	76–67	(Spain) Laboral Kutxa	Zagreb, Croatia
20:00 (CET)	Scoring by quarter: 16–18, 15–19, 23–13, 22–17
	Pts: Pullen 26; Rebs: Babić, Bilan 10; Asts: Gordić 7 PIR: Pullen 23	Boxscore	Pts: Blažič 20; Rebs: Bourousis, Hanga 8 Asts: Adams 6 PIR: Bourousis 26	Arena: Dražen Petrović Zagreb; Attendance: 4,719; Referees: Eddie Viator (FRA), Jakub Zamojski (POL), Aare Halliko (EST)

19 November 2015	Cedevita (Croatia)	70–83	(Greece) Olympiacos	Zagreb, Croatia
19:00 (CET)	Scoring by quarter: 24–21, 16–20, 16–23, 14–19
	Pts: Pullen 13; Rebs: Bilan 8 Asts: Gordić 5 PIR: Bilan, White 17	Boxscore	Pts: Hunter 19; Rebs: Hunter, Papapetrou 8 Asts: Strawberry 5 PIR: Hunter 21	Arena: Dražen Petrović Zagreb; Attendance: 5,281; Referees: Miguel Ángel Pérez Pérez (ESP), Carmelo Paternico (ITA), Petri Mäntylä (FIN)

19 November 2015	Laboral Kutxa (Spain)	94–82	(Italy) EA7 Emporio Armani Milan	Vitoria-Gasteiz, Spain
20:30 (CET)	Scoring by quarter: 28–19, 24–18, 20–17, 22–28
	Pts: Causeur 22; Rebs: Bourousis 13; Asts: Adams 4 PIR: Causeur 28	Boxscore	Pts: Gentile 24; Rebs: Barać 12; Asts: Cinciarini 7 PIR: Barać 21	Arena: Fernando Buesa Arena; Attendance: 9,734; Referees: Robert Lottermoser (GER), Elias Koromilas (GRE), Joseph Bissang (FRA)

20 November 2015	Anadolu Efes (Turkey)	92–74	(France) Limoges	Istanbul, Turkey
19:00 (CET)	Scoring by quarter: 25–20, 26–15, 19–22, 22–17
	Pts: Brown 21; Rebs: Dunston 11; Asts: Dunston 7 PIR: Dunston 27	Boxscore	Pts: Diawara 17; Rebs: Traoré, Zerbo 6 Asts: Westermann 7 PIR: Westermann 16	Arena: Abdi İpekçi Arena; Attendance: 4,122; Referees: Luigi Lamonica (ITA), Carlos Peruga (ESP), Clemens Fritz (GER)

26 November 2015	Limoges (France)	69–78	(Croatia) Cedevita	Limoges, France
20:30 (CET)	Scoring by quarter: 18–20, 21–28, 12–15, 18–15
	Pts: Schaffartzik 17; Rebs: Schaffartzik, Westermann 6 Asts: Schaffartzik 11; PIR: Schaffartzik 30	Boxscore	Pts: Babić 19; Rebs: Babić 6 Asts: Pullen 4 PIR: Babić 24	Arena: Beaublanc; Attendance: 4,420; Referees: Emilio Pérez Pizarro (ESP), Spiros Gkontas (GRE), Ersan Kartal (TUR)

26 November 2015	Olympiacos (Greece)	59–52	(Spain) Laboral Kutxa	Piraeus, Greece
20:45 (CET)	Scoring by quarter: 12–6, 24–16, 10–17, 13–13
	Pts: Spanoulis 10; Rebs: Hunter 10; Asts: Mantzaris 4 PIR: Athinaou, Hunter 12	Boxscore	Pts: Bourousis 16; Rebs: Bourousis 15; Asts: Adams, James 2 PIR: Bourousis 26	Arena: Peace and Friendship Stadium; Attendance: 8,000; Referees: Luigi Lamonica (ITA), Boris Shulga (UKR), Miloš Koljenšić (MNE)

26 November 2015	EA7 Emporio Armani Milan (Italy)	88–84	(Turkey) Anadolu Efes	Milan, Italy
21:00 (CET)	Scoring by quarter: 23–21, 21–25, 22–19, 22–19
	Pts: McLean 26; Rebs: three players 5 Asts: Simon 6 PIR: McLean 36	Boxscore	Pts: Batuk 17; Rebs: Dunston 8 Asts: Heurtel 9 PIR: Dunston 22	Arena: Mediolanum Forum; Attendance: 8,323; Referees: Daniel Hierrezuelo (ESP), Sreten Radović (CRO), Aare Halliko (EST)

3 December 2015	Cedevita (Croatia)	75–81	(Turkey) Anadolu Efes	Zagreb, Croatia
19:00 (CET)	Scoring by quarter: 13–17, 26–25, 26–15, 10–24
	Pts: Bilan 18; Rebs: Bilan 8 Asts: Pullen 5 PIR: Bilan, Pullen 20	Boxscore	Pts: Šarić 16; Rebs: Šarić 10; Asts: Heurtel 9 PIR: Šarić 20	Arena: Dražen Petrović Zagreb; Attendance: 5,107; Referees: Juan Carlos García González (ESP), Anastasios Piloidis (GRE), Amit Balak (ISR)

3 December 2015	Laboral Kutxa (Spain)	92–56	(France) Limoges	Vitoria-Gasteiz, Spain
20:30 (CET)	Scoring by quarter: 29–15, 25–14, 19–14, 19–13
	Pts: Adams 23; Rebs: Bourousis 10; Asts: Bourousis 6 PIR: Adams 23	Boxscore	Pts: Westermann 14; Rebs: three players 4 Asts: Boungou Colo 4 PIR: Gatens 11	Arena: Fernando Buesa Arena; Attendance: 9,137; Referees: Christos Christodoulou (GRE), Borys Ryzhyk (UKR), Tolga Sahin (ITA)

3 December 2015	Olympiacos (Greece)	73–63	(Italy) EA7 Emporio Armani Milan	Piraeus, Greece
21:00 (CET)	Scoring by quarter: 14–13, 11–16, 23–19, 25–15
	Pts: Strawberry 16; Rebs: Strawberry 9 Asts: Hackett 5 PIR: Strawberry 22	Boxscore	Pts: Cinciarini, Jenkins 12; Rebs: McLean 10; Asts: Simon 6 PIR: Simon 16	Arena: Peace and Friendship Stadium; Attendance: 6,799; Referees: Oļegs Latiševs (LAT), Vicente Bultó (ESP), Marcin Kowalski (POL)

10 December 2015	Anadolu Efes (Turkey)	95–86	(Spain) Laboral Kutxa	Istanbul, Turkey
20:00 (CET)	Scoring by quarter: 16−21, 25−25, 26−20, 28−20
	Pts: Heurtel 25; Rebs: Brown 8 Asts: Heurtel 9 PIR: Heurtel 32	Boxscore	Pts: Adams 20; Rebs: Tillie 7 Asts: Adams 4 PIR: Bourousis 17	Arena: Abdi İpekçi Arena; Attendance: 4,921; Referees: Fernando Rocha (POR), Damir Javor (SLO), Piotr Pastusiak (POL)

10 December 2015	Limoges (France)	67–76	(Greece) Olympiacos	Limoges, France
20:30 (CET)	Scoring by quarter: 15−20, 21−26, 12−19, 19−11
	Pts: Traoré, Westermann 14; Rebs: Traoré, Zerbo 6 Asts: Westermann 5 PIR: Traoré, Westermann 14	Boxscore	Pts: Printezis 13; Rebs: 3 players 4 Asts: Athinaiou 5 PIR: Printezis 17	Arena: Beaublanc; Attendance: 4,000; Referees: Milivoje Jovčić (SRB), Antonio Conde (ESP), Jakub Zamojski (POL)

11 December 2015	Cedevita (Croatia)	82–85	(Italy) EA7 Emporio Armani Milan	Zagreb, Croatia
19:00 (CET)	Scoring by quarter: 18−25, 13−20, 26−21, 25−19
	Pts: Bilan 23; Rebs: Babić 6 Asts: Pullen 7 PIR: Bilan 28	Boxscore	Pts: Hummel 21; Rebs: Hummel 8 Asts: Simon 7 PIR: Hummel 29	Arena: Dražen Petrović Zagreb; Attendance: 5,200; Referees: Borys Ryzhyk (UKR), Carlos Cortés (ESP), David Romano (ISR)

17 December 2015	Laboral Kutxa (Spain)	92–70	(Croatia) Cedevita	Vitoria-Gasteiz, Spain
20:30 (CET)	Scoring by quarter: 23−16, 22−13, 22−28, 25−13
	Pts: Causeur 20; Rebs: Bourousis 10; Asts: James 6 PIR: Causeur 31	Boxscore	Pts: Arapović 12; Rebs: White 7 Asts: Gordić, Pullen 3 PIR: Babić 16	Arena: Fernando Buesa Arena; Attendance: 8,945; Referees: Elias Koromilas (GRE), Joseph Bissang (FRA), Seffi Shemmesh (ISR)

18 December 2015	EA7 Emporio Armani Milan (Italy)	69–77	(France) Limoges	Milan, Italy
20:45 (CET)	Scoring by quarter: 19–20, 22–28, 13–18, 15–11
	Pts: Mačvan 15; Rebs: Simon 7 Asts: Mačvan 4 PIR: Mačvan 22	Boxscore	Pts: Boungou Colo 21; Rebs: Boungou Colo, Zerbo 8 Asts: three players 4 PIR: Boungou Colo 34	Arena: Mediolanum Forum; Attendance: 8,900; Referees: Miguel Ángel Pérez Pérez (ESP), Sašo Petek (SLO), Igor Dragojević (MNE)

18 December 2015	Olympiacos (Greece)	68–81	(Turkey) Anadolu Efes	Piraeus, Greece
20:45 (CET)	Scoring by quarter: 10–21, 19–19, 25–24, 14–17
	Pts: Hackett 19; Rebs: Printezis 7 Asts: Athinaiou, Papapetrou 3 PIR: Hackett 23	Boxscore	Pts: Heurtel, Šarić 13; Rebs: Šarić 8 Asts: Heurtel 5 PIR: Šarić 21	Arena: Peace and Friendship Stadium; Attendance: 8,000; Referees: Saša Pukl (SLO), Emilio Pérez Pizarro (ESP), Milija Vojinović (SRB)

=== Group C ===
Pos	Team	Pld	W	L	PF	PA	PD	Qualification
1	(Russia) Lokomotiv Kuban	10	8	2	754	683	+71	Advance to Top 16
2	(Spain) FC Barcelona Lassa	10	6	4	822	747	+75	Advance to Top 16
3	(Greece) Panathinaikos	10	6	4	756	710	+46	Advance to Top 16
4	(Lithuania) Žalgiris	10	5	5	697	731	−34	Advance to Top 16
5	(Turkey) Pınar Karşıyaka	10	3	7	698	772	−74	Transfer to Eurocup
6	(Poland) Stelmet Zielona Góra	10	2	8	664	748	−84	Transfer to Eurocup

Source: Euroleague

15 October 2015	Pınar Karşıyaka (Turkey)	71–62	(Spain) FC Barcelona Lassa	İzmir, Turkey
18:00 (CEST)	Scoring by quarter: 18–18, 11–9, 25–11, 17–24
	Pts: Iverson 16; Rebs: Gabriel 10; Asts: Sipahi 6 PIR: Iverson 19	Boxscore	Pts: Doellman 14; Rebs: Doellman 7 Asts: Ribas 4 PIR: Doellman 19	Arena: Karşıyaka Arena; Attendance: 4,579; Referees: Luigi Lamonica (ITA), Siniša Herceg (CRO), Sašo Petek (SLO)

16 October 2015	Lokomotiv Kuban (Russia)	81–70	(Greece) Panathinaikos	Krasnodar, Russia
17:00 (CEST)	Scoring by quarter: 17–21, 28–20, 18–20, 18–9
	Pts: Singleton 16; Rebs: Singleton 9 Asts: Delaney 5 PIR: Singleton 21	Boxscore	Pts: Raduljica 15; Rebs: three players 5 Asts: Calathes 7 PIR: Diamantidis 19	Arena: Basket Hall; Attendance: 5,778; Referees: Borys Ryzhyk (UKR), Milija Vojinović (SRB), Petri Mäntylä (FIN)

16 October 2015	Stelmet Zielona Góra (Poland)	62–66	(Lithuania) Žalgiris	Zielona Góra, Poland
19:00 (CEST)	Scoring by quarter: 17–15, 18–19, 18–12, 9–20
	Pts: Moldoveanu 16; Rebs: Ponitka, Đurišić 6 Asts: three players 2 PIR: Moldoveanu 18	Boxscore	Pts: Jankūnas 17; Rebs: Jankūnas 11; Asts: Kalnietis 6 PIR: Jankūnas 25	Arena: Centrum Rekreacyjno Sportowe; Attendance: 3,482; Referees: Milivoje Jovčić (SRB), Panagiotis Anastopoulos (GRE), Ersan Kartal (TUR)

22 October 2015	Panathinaikos (Greece)	85–73	(Turkey) Pınar Karşıyaka	Athens, Greece
21:00 (CEST)	Scoring by quarter: 30–15, 17–19, 17–18, 21–21
	Pts: Gist 27; Rebs: Calathes, Gist 6 Asts: Calathes 11; PIR: Gist 34	Boxscore	Pts: Gabriel 17; Rebs: Gabriel 10; Asts: Sipahi 4 PIR: Gabriel 23	Arena: Olympic Sports Center Athens; Attendance: 4,515; Referees: Sreten Radović (CRO), Jakub Zamojski (POL), Benjamín Jiménez (ESP)

23 October 2015	Žalgiris (Lithuania)	74–76	(Russia) Lokomotiv Kuban	Kaunas, Lithuania
18:45 (CEST)	Scoring by quarter: 31–27, 9–16, 17–17, 17–16
	Pts: Vougioukas 22; Rebs: Jankūnas, Ulanovas 5 Asts: Kalnietis 5 PIR: Vougioukas 20	Boxscore	Pts: Delaney 21; Rebs: Broekhoff 6 Asts: Voronov 3 PIR: Delaney 22	Arena: Žalgirio Arena; Attendance: 10,488; Referees: Saša Pukl (SLO), Oļegs Latiševs (LAT), Marek Ćmikiewicz (POL)

23 October 2015	FC Barcelona Lassa (Spain)	78–72	(Poland) Stelmet Zielona Góra	Barcelona, Spain
21:00 (CEST)	Scoring by quarter: 19–20, 24–17, 21–20, 14–15
	Pts: Samuels 23; Rebs: Lawal 12; Asts: Tomić 5 PIR: Samuels 33	Boxscore	Pts: Borovnjak, Ponitka 15; Rebs: Ponitka 9 Asts: Koszarek 7 PIR: Borovnjak 19	Arena: Palau Blaugrana; Attendance: 7,089; Referees: Christos Christodoulou (GRE), Petri Mäntylä (FIN), Tomislav Hordov (CRO)

29 October 2015	Pınar Karşıyaka (Turkey)	66–68	(Lithuania) Žalgiris	İzmir, Turkey
18:45 (CET)	Scoring by quarter: 15–23, 18–15, 19–20, 14–10
	Pts: Gabriel 17; Rebs: Carter 11; Asts: Ragland 8 PIR: Gabriel, Carter 19	Boxscore	Pts: Jankūnas 16; Rebs: Jankūnas 10; Asts: Kalnietis 5 PIR: Jankūnas 24	Arena: Karşıyaka Arena; Attendance: 4,062; Referees: Emilio Pérez Pizarro (ESP), Borys Ryzhyk (UKR), Piotr Pastusiak (POL)

29 October 2015	FC Barcelona Lassa (Spain)	77–52	(Greece) Panathinaikos	Barcelona, Spain
21:00 (CET)	Scoring by quarter: 17–11, 25–17, 13–15, 22–9
	Pts: Doellman 13; Rebs: Samuels 9 Asts: Tomić 4 PIR: Tomić 24	Boxscore	Pts: Gist 13; Rebs: Raduljica 9 Asts: Calathes 4 PIR: Raduljica 13	Arena: Palau Blaugrana; Attendance: 6,141; Referees: Saša Pukl (SLO), Eddie Viator (FRA), Oļegs Latiševs (LAT)

30 October 2015	Stelmet Zielona Góra (Poland)	75–83	(Russia) Lokomotiv Kuban	Zielona Góra, Poland
20:00 (CET)	Scoring by quarter: 15–13, 23–27, 19–19, 18–24
	Pts: Bost, Moldoveanu 16; Rebs: Koszarek 4 Asts: three players 3 PIR: Bost 19	Boxscore	Pts: Delaney 25; Rebs: Claver 8 Asts: Delaney 5 PIR: Delaney 28	Arena: Centrum Rekreacyjno Sportowe; Attendance: 3,174; Referees: Spiros Gkontas (GRE), Recep Ankaralı (TUR), Miloš Koljenšić (MNE)

6 November 2015	Lokomotiv Kuban (Russia)	72–53	(Turkey) Pınar Karşıyaka	Krasnodar, Russia
18:00 (CET)	Scoring by quarter: 17–21, 13–14, 22–7, 20–11
	Pts: Delaney, Voronov 15; Rebs: Fesenko 7 Asts: Delaney 5 PIR: Delaney 20	Boxscore	Pts: Ragland 15; Rebs: Iverson 6 Asts: Ragland 4 PIR: Carter 15	Arena: Basket Hall; Attendance: 3,751; Referees: Matej Boltauzer (SLO), Marko Juras (SRB), Marcin Kowalski (POL)

6 November 2015	Žalgiris (Lithuania)	78–85	(Spain) FC Barcelona Lassa	Kaunas, Lithuania
18:45 (CET)	Scoring by quarter: 23–22, 16–23, 18–22, 21–18
	Pts: Seibutis 18; Rebs: Vougioukas 7 Asts: Ulanovas 5 PIR: Jankūnas 21	Boxscore	Pts: Tomić 18; Rebs: Tomić 8 Asts: Satoranský 4 PIR: Tomić 22	Arena: Žalgirio Arena; Attendance: 14,790; Referees: Robert Lottermoser (GER), Carmelo Paternico (ITA), Amit Balak (ISR)

6 November 2015	Stelmet Zielona Góra (Poland)	71–68	(Greece) Panathinaikos	Zielona Góra, Poland
19:00 (CET)	Scoring by quarter: 19–15, 21–18, 17–16, 14–19
	Pts: Ponitka 13; Rebs: Ponitka 10; Asts: Reynolds 7 PIR: Ponitka 16	Boxscore	Pts: Feldeine 15; Rebs: Calathes 7 Asts: Calathes 7 PIR: Kuzmić 17	Arena: Centrum Rekreacyjno Sportowe; Attendance: 3,572; Referees: Luigi Lamonica (ITA), Carlos Peruga (ESP), Torkild Rødsand (NOR)

12 November 2015	FC Barcelona Lassa (Spain)	72–68	(Russia) Lokomotiv Kuban	Barcelona, Spain
20:45 (CET)	Scoring by quarter: 18–16, 19–15, 11–18, 24–19
	Pts: Tomić 16; Rebs: Satoranský 6 Asts: Tomić 7 PIR: Tomić 24	Boxscore	Pts: Draper 20; Rebs: Singleton 8 Asts: Delaney 4 PIR: Draper 21	Arena: Palau Blaugrana; Attendance: 4,867; Referees: Ilija Belošević (SRB), Elias Koromilas (GRE), Joseph Bissang (FRA)

13 November 2015	Pınar Karşıyaka (Turkey)	77–66	(Poland) Stelmet Zielona Góra	İzmir, Turkey
18:45 (CET)	Scoring by quarter: 21–16, 15–12, 21–13, 20–25
	Pts: Iverson 15; Rebs: Palacios 7 Asts: four players 3 PIR: Iverson 20	Boxscore	Pts: Đurišić 16; Rebs: Ponitka 12; Asts: Ponitka 4 PIR: Ponitka 17	Arena: Karşıyaka Arena; Attendance: 2,714; Referees: Juan Carlos García González (ESP), Seffi Shemmesh (ISR), Jean-Charles Collin (FRA)

13 November 2015	Panathinaikos (Greece)	91–56	(Lithuania) Žalgiris	Athens, Greece
20:45 (CET)	Scoring by quarter: 27–13, 17–12, 26–16, 21–15
	Pts: Raduljica 18; Rebs: four players 5 Asts: Calathes 8 PIR: Janković 17	Boxscore	Pts: Vougioukas 15; Rebs: Vougioukas 7 Asts: Seibutis, Vene 2 PIR: Vougioukas 20	Arena: Olympic Sports Center Athens; Attendance: 6,412; Referees: Fernando Rocha (POR), Vicente Bultó (ESP), Matej Boltauzer (SLO)

19 November 2015	Žalgiris (Lithuania)	67–56	(Poland) Stelmet Zielona Góra	Kaunas, Lithuania
18:45 (CET)	Scoring by quarter: 17–14, 19–15, 21–20, 10–7
	Pts: Jankūnas 16; Rebs: Hanlan 8 Asts: Kalnietis 5 PIR: Jankūnas 22	Boxscore	Pts: Ponitka 15; Rebs: Ponitka 7 Asts: Koszarek 6 PIR: Ponitka 22	Arena: Žalgirio Arena; Attendance: 9,153; Referees: Srđan Dožai (CRO), Oļegs Latiševs (LAT), David Romano (ISR)

19 November 2015	FC Barcelona Lassa (Spain)	107–79	(Turkey) Pınar Karşıyaka	Barcelona, Spain
21:00 (CET)	Scoring by quarter: 26–16, 22–21, 31–20, 28–22
	Pts: Lawal 19; Rebs: Tomić 7 Asts: Satoranský 6 PIR: Lawal 24	Boxscore	Pts: Ragland 26; Rebs: Iverson, Ragland 7 Asts: Sipahi 7 PIR: Ragland 26	Arena: Palau Blaugrana; Attendance: 4,771; Referees: Christos Christodoulou (GRE), Damir Javor (SLO), Petar Obradović (BIH)

20 November 2015	Panathinaikos (Greece)	71–77	(Russia) Lokomotiv Kuban	Athens, Greece
20:45 (CET)	Scoring by quarter: 10–21, 19–12, 25–26, 17–18
	Pts: Feldeine 14; Rebs: Kuzmić 6 Asts: Diamantidis 6 PIR: Feldeine 16	Boxscore	Pts: Delaney 23; Rebs: Claver 7 Asts: Delaney 5 PIR: Delaney 26	Arena: Olympic Sports Center Athens; Attendance: 7,985; Referees: Sreten Radović (CRO), Juan Carlos García González (ESP), Tolga Sahin (ITA)

26 November 2015	Stelmet Zielona Góra (Poland)	64–93	(Spain) FC Barcelona Lassa	Zielona Góra, Poland
19:00 (CET)	Scoring by quarter: 18–24, 17–20, 15–25, 14–24
	Pts: Ponitka 11; Rebs: Ponitka 6 Asts: Bost 5 PIR: Ponitka 15	Boxscore	Pts: Abrines 16; Rebs: Tomić 6 Asts: Ribas 7 PIR: Vezenkov 23	Arena: Centrum Rekreacyjno Sportowe; Attendance: 5,002; Referees: Milivoje Jovčić (SRB), Panagiotis Anastopoulos (GRE), Tolga Sahin (ITA)

27 November 2015	Lokomotiv Kuban (Russia)	80–50	(Lithuania) Žalgiris	Krasnodar, Russia
16:45 (CET)	Scoring by quarter: 28–14, 25–3, 12–10, 15–23
	Pts: Voronov 14; Rebs: Claver 10; Asts: Delaney 6 PIR: Broekhoff 25	Boxscore	Pts: Vougioukas 15; Rebs: Motum 7 Asts: Vene 3 PIR: Vougioukas 15	Arena: Basket Hall; Attendance: 3,783; Referees: Saša Pukl (SLO), Carlos Cortés (ESP), Sinisa Herceg (CRO)

27 November 2015	Pınar Karşıyaka (Turkey)	66–69	(Greece) Panathinaikos	İzmir, Turkey
18:45 (CET)	Scoring by quarter: 9–21, 14–15, 18–14, 25–19
	Pts: Iverson 14; Rebs: Carter 7 Asts: Sipahi 5 PIR: Iverson 21	Boxscore	Pts: Feldeine 17; Rebs: Feldeine 7 Asts: Gist 4 PIR: Feldeine 21	Arena: Karşıyaka Arena; Attendance: 5,000; Referees: Borys Rhyzhyk (UKR), Antonio Conde (ESP), Sašo Petek (SLO)

2 December 2015	Žalgiris (Lithuania)	74–52	(Turkey) Pınar Karşıyaka	Kaunas, Lithuania
18:45 (CET)	Scoring by quarter: 22–14, 18–11, 13–16, 21–11
	Pts: Kalnietis 17; Rebs: Jankūnas, Motum 8 Asts: Kalnietis 6 PIR: Kalnietis 19	Boxscore	Pts: Carter 13; Rebs: three players 5 Asts: Sipahi 4 PIR: Carter 15	Arena: Žalgirio Arena; Attendance: 9,160; Referees: Daniel Hierrezuelo (ESP), Eddie Viator (FRA), Igor Dragojević (MNE)

4 December 2015	Lokomotiv Kuban (Russia)	51–66	(Poland) Stelmet Zielona Góra	Krasnodar, Russia
18:00 (CET)	Scoring by quarter: 13–24, 14–16, 11–12, 13–14
	Pts: Singleton 11; Rebs: Claver 8 Asts: Broekhoff 4 PIR: Singleton 18	Boxscore	Pts: three players 11; Rebs: Ponitka 11; Asts: Koszarek 5 PIR: Ponitka 19	Arena: Basket Hall; Attendance: 3,116; Referees: Luigi Lamonica (ITA), Antonio Conde (ESP), Torkild Rødsand (NOR)

4 December 2015	Panathinaikos (Greece)	93–86	(Spain) FC Barcelona Lassa	Athens, Greece
20:45 (CET)	Scoring by quarter: 21–22, 24–13, 21–22, 27–29
	Pts: Raduljica 25; Rebs: Calathes 7 Asts: Calathes 10; PIR: Raduljica 31	Boxscore	Pts: Abrines 21; Rebs: Tomić 11; Asts: Satoranský 4 PIR: Tomić 20	Arena: Olympic Sports Center Athens; Attendance: 13,972; Referees: Robert Lottermosser (GER), Piotr Pastusiak (POL), Sergey Zashchuk (UKR)

10 December 2015	Pınar Karşıyaka (Turkey)	78–88	(Russia) Lokomotiv Kuban	İzmir, Turkey
18:00 (CET)	Scoring by quarter: 22−27, 21−23, 14−20, 21−18
	Pts: Carter 25; Rebs: Palacios 6 Asts: Şentürk 5 PIR: Carter 30	Boxscore	Pts: Broekhoff 26; Rebs: Singleton, Fesenko 7 Asts: Delaney 11; PIR: Broekhoff 28	Arena: Karşıyaka Arena; Attendance: 2,500; Referees: Emilio Pérez Pizarro (ESP), Carmelo Paternico (ITA), Ioannis Foufis (GRE)

10 December 2015	FC Barcelona Lassa (Spain)	88–92	(Lithuania) Žalgiris	Barcelona, Spain
21:00 (CET)	Scoring by quarter: 16–27, 22–18, 25–25, 25–22
	Pts: Tomić 28; Rebs: Tomić, Vezenkov 5 Asts: Ribas 5 PIR: Tomić 38	Boxscore	Pts: Jankūnas 17; Rebs: Ulanovas 7 Asts: Kalnietis 6 PIR: Kalnietis 18	Arena: Palau Blaugrana; Attendance: 4,236; Referees: Spiros Gkontas (GRE), Marcin Kowalski (POL), Aare Halliko (EST)

11 December 2015	Panathinaikos (Greece)	82–51	(Poland) Stelmet Zielona Góra	Athens, Greece
20:45 (CET)	Scoring by quarter: 26−23, 21−10, 20−14, 15−4
	Pts: Calathes 18; Rebs: Kuzmić 9 Asts: Calathes 7 PIR: Calathes 29	Boxscore	Pts: Ponitka 11; Rebs: four players 5 Asts: Ponitka, Koszarek 3 PIR: Ponitka 22	Arena: Olympic Sports Center Athens; Attendance: 6,200; Referees: Daniel Hierrezuelo (ESP), Joseph Bissang (FRA), Petri Mäntylä (FIN)

17 December 2015	Žalgiris (Lithuania)	72–75	(Greece) Panathinaikos	Kaunas, Lithuania
18:45 (CET)	Scoring by quarter: 16–21, 20–13, 22–18, 14–23
	Pts: Hanlan 19; Rebs: Jankūnas 11; Asts: Hanlan 4 PIR: Jankūnas 21	Boxscore	Pts: Calathes, Feldeine 14; Rebs: Pavlović 10; Asts: Calathes 6 PIR: Calathes 21	Arena: Žalgirio Arena; Attendance: 12,684; Referees: Juan Carlos García González (ESP), Matej Boltauzer (SLO), Boris Shulga (UKR)

18 December 2015	Lokomotiv Kuban (Russia)	78–74	(Spain) FC Barcelona Lassa	Krasnodar, Russia
18:00 (CET)	Scoring by quarter: 18–17, 11–18, 25–25, 24–14
	Pts: Randolph 16; Rebs: Randolph 7 Asts: Delaney 9 PIR: Delaney 27	Boxscore	Pts: Navarro 22; Rebs: Tomić 7 Asts: Arroyo 5 PIR: Navarro 23	Arena: Basket Hall; Attendance: 7,353; Referees: Ilija Belošević (SRB), Jakub Zamojski (POL), David Romano (ISR)

18 December 2015	Stelmet Zielona Góra (Poland)	81–83	(Turkey) Pınar Karşıyaka	Zielona Góra, Poland
19:00 (CET)	Scoring by quarter: 20–24, 16–25, 25–14, 20–20
	Pts: Ponitka 20; Rebs: Ponitka 10; Asts: Bost 7 PIR: Ponitka 32	Boxscore	Pts: Carter 27; Rebs: Palacios 9 Asts: three players 4 PIR: Carter 29	Arena: Centrum Rekreacyjno Sportowe; Attendance: 2,750; Referees: Sreten Radović (CRO), Carlos Cortés (ESP), Sergey Zashchuk (UKR)

=== Group D ===
Pos	Team	Pld	W	L	PF	PA	PD	Qualification
1	(Russia) CSKA Moscow	10	9	1	911	784	+127	Advance to Top 16
2	(Spain) Unicaja	10	7	3	761	719	+42	Advance to Top 16
3	(Germany) Brose Baskets	10	6	4	778	720	+58	Advance to Top 16
4	(Turkey) Darüşşafaka Doğuş	10	4	6	704	740	−36	Advance to Top 16
5	(Israel) Maccabi Tel Aviv	10	4	6	750	792	−42	Transfer to Eurocup
6	(Italy) Banco di Sardegna Sassari	10	0	10	690	839	−149	Transfer to Eurocup

Source: Euroleague

15 October 2015	CSKA Moscow (Russia)	100–69	(Israel) Maccabi Tel Aviv	Moscow, Russia
19:00 (CEST)	Scoring by quarter: 29–20, 15–9, 29–19, 27–21
	Pts: de Colo 17; Rebs: Vorontsevich 7 Asts: Jackson 7 PIR: Jackson 22	Boxscore	Pts: Farmar 17; Rebs: Onuaku 7 Asts: Farmar 3 PIR: Farmar 17	Arena: USH CSKA; Attendance: 4,831; Referees: Robert Lottermoser (GER), Oļegs Latiševs (LAT), Tolga Sahin (ITA)

15 October 2015	Darüşşafaka Doğuş (Turkey)	83–74(OT)	(Italy) Banco di Sardegna Sassari	Istanbul, Turkey
20:00 (CEST)	Scoring by quarter: 15–19, 17–12, 14–19, 20–16, Overtime: 17–8
	Pts: Bjelica 15; Rebs: Erden 12; Asts: Preldžić 8 PIR: Erden 20	Boxscore	Pts: Stipčević 14; Rebs: Alexander 8 Asts: Stipčević 3 PIR: Stipčević 15	Arena: Ayhan Şahenk Sports Hall; Attendance: 4,755; Referees: Fernando Rocha (POR), Benjamín Jiménez (ESP), David Romano (ISR)

15 October 2015	Unicaja (Spain)	76–71	(Germany) Brose Baskets	Málaga, Spain
20:45 (CEST)	Scoring by quarter: 18–18, 18–16, 27–15, 13–22
	Pts: Kuzminskas 18; Rebs: Vázquez 6 Asts: Marković 7 PIR: Kuzminskas 24	Boxscore	Pts: Zisis 16; Rebs: Melli, Wanamaker 6 Asts: Strēlnieks 5 PIR: Zisis, Strēlnieks 17	Arena: Martín Carpena; Attendance: 6,031; Referees: Eddie Viator (FRA), Ioannis Foufis (GRE), Tomislav Hordov (CRO)

22 October 2015	Maccabi Tel Aviv (Israel)	82–93	(Spain) Unicaja	Tel Aviv, Israel
20:05 (CEST)	Scoring by quarter: 21–24, 26–23, 16–21, 19–25
	Pts: Rochestie 18; Rebs: Smith 8 Asts: Rochestie 7 PIR: Mbakwe 25	Boxscore	Pts: Kuzminskas 23; Rebs: Hendrix 6 Asts: Hendrix 6 PIR: Kuzminskas 25	Arena: Menora Mivtachim Arena; Attendance: 11,060; Referees: Ilija Belošević (SRB), Damir Javor (SLO), Piotr Pastusiak (POL)

23 October 2015	Brose Baskets (Germany)	86–76	(Turkey) Darüşşafaka Doğuş	Bamberg, Germany
20:00 (CEST)	Scoring by quarter: 20–13, 16–14, 31–29, 19–20
	Pts: Miller, Strēlnieks 13; Rebs: Melli 8 Asts: Zisis 5 PIR: Miller 15	Boxscore	Pts: Bjelica 16; Rebs: Slaughter 5 Asts: Gordon, Preldžić 5 PIR: Bjelica 15	Arena: Brose Arena; Attendance: 6,800; Referees: Luigi Lamonica (ITA), Matej Boltauzer (SLO), Miloš Koljenšić (MNE)

23 October 2015	Banco di Sardegna Sassari (Italy)	78–107	(Russia) CSKA Moscow	Sassari, Italy
20:45 (CEST)	Scoring by quarter: 26–25, 15–35, 22–19, 15–28
	Pts: Logan 20; Rebs: Varnado 8 Asts: Haynes 6 PIR: Stipčević 20	Boxscore	Pts: de Colo 18; Rebs: de Colo, Hines 5 Asts: Teodosić 10; PIR: de Colo 24	Arena: PalaSerradimigni; Attendance: 4,005; Referees: Daniel Hierrezuelo (ESP), Elias Koromilas (GRE), Milivoje Jovčić (SRB)

29 October 2015	CSKA Moscow (Russia)	83–77	(Germany) Brose Baskets	Moscow, Russia
18:00 (CET)	Scoring by quarter: 16–15, 21–13, 21–21, 25–28
	Pts: de Colo 22; Rebs: Vorontsevich, Kurbanov 6 Asts: de Colo 7 PIR: de Colo 28	Boxscore	Pts: Wanamaker 19; Rebs: Melli 6 Asts: Wanamaker, Strēlnieks 3 PIR: Wanamaker 18	Arena: USH CSKA; Attendance: 4,421; Referees: Fernando Rocha (POR), Carlos Cortés (ESP), Milija Vojinović (SRB)

29 October 2015	Maccabi Tel Aviv (Israel)	79–63	(Italy) Banco di Sardegna Sassari	Tel Aviv, Israel
20:05 (CET)	Scoring by quarter: 15–17, 20–16, 22–14, 22–16
	Pts: Smith 22; Rebs: Mbakwe 15; Asts: Ohayon 6 PIR: Smith, Mbakwe 21	Boxscore	Pts: Eyenga 21; Rebs: Alexander 8 Asts: Logan, Haynes 3 PIR: Eyenga 25	Arena: Menora Mivtachim Arena; Attendance: 11,060; Referees: Christos Christodoulou (GRE), Juan Carlos García González (ESP), Sergey Zashchuk (UKR)

30 October 2015	Unicaja (Spain)	81–69	(Turkey) Darüşşafaka Doğuş	Málaga, Spain
19:00 (CET)	Scoring by quarter: 16–20, 28–17, 20–16, 17–16
	Pts: Jackson 18; Rebs: Hendrix, Thomas 5 Asts: Marković 9 PIR: Jackson 22	Boxscore	Pts: Erden 17; Rebs: Erden 9 Asts: Preldžić 5 PIR: Erden 21	Arena: Martín Carpena; Attendance: 5,761; Referees: Sreten Radović (CRO), Petri Mäntylä (FIN), Marcin Kowalski (POL)

5 November 2015	Darüşşafaka Doğuş (Turkey)	75–80	(Russia) CSKA Moscow	Istanbul, Turkey
18:45 (CET)	Scoring by quarter: 19–24, 24–24, 9–22, 23–10
	Pts: Harangody 18; Rebs: Slaughter 8 Asts: Gordon, Preldžić 5 PIR: Slaughter 27	Boxscore	Pts: Teodosić 22; Rebs: Hines 6 Asts: Teodosić 9 PIR: Teodosić 28	Arena: Volkswagen Arena; Attendance: 3,291; Referees: Miguel Ángel Pérez Pérez (ESP), Boris Shulga (UKR), Piotr Pastusiak (POL)

5 November 2015	Brose Baskets (Germany)	77–66	(Israel) Maccabi Tel Aviv	Bamberg, Germany
19:00 (CET)	Scoring by quarter: 23–22, 19–13, 9–22, 26–9
	Pts: Theis 16; Rebs: Wanamaker 8 Asts: Melli 10; PIR: Theis 23	Boxscore	Pts: Smith 19; Rebs: Mbakwe 7 Asts: Rochestie 9 PIR: Rochestie 15	Arena: Brose Arena; Attendance: 6,800; Referees: Borys Ryzhyk (UKR), Anastasios Piloidis (GRE), Marek Ćmikiewicz (POL)

6 November 2015	Unicaja (Spain)	80–62	(Italy) Banco di Sardegna Sassari	Málaga, Spain
20:45 (CET)	Scoring by quarter: 20–16, 16–21, 24–7, 20–18
	Pts: Hendrix 19; Rebs: Thomas 8 Asts: Marković 6 PIR: Hendrix 21	Boxscore	Pts: Haynes 18; Rebs: Alexander 8 Asts: three players 3 PIR: Haynes 23	Arena: Martín Carpena; Attendance: 6,613; Referees: Saša Pukl (SLO), Panagiotis Anastopoulos (GRE), Siniša Herceg (CRO)

12 November 2015	Maccabi Tel Aviv (Israel)	73–84	(Turkey) Darüşşafaka Doğuş	Tel Aviv, Israel
20:05 (CET)	Scoring by quarter: 20–20, 19–17, 14–23, 20–24
	Pts: Rochestie 17; Rebs: Mbakwe 5 Asts: Farmar 5 PIR: Rochestie 15	Boxscore	Pts: Markoishvili 22; Rebs: Bjelica 8 Asts: Gordon 8 PIR: Markoishvili 24	Arena: Menora Mivtachim Arena; Attendance: 11,060; Referees: Oļegs Latiševs (LAT), Emilio Pérez Pizarro (ESP), Marko Juras (SRB)

13 November 2015	CSKA Moscow (Russia)	78–86	(Spain) Unicaja	Moscow, Russia
18:00 (CET)	Scoring by quarter: 20–17, 23–25, 22–19, 13–25
	Pts: Higgins 17; Rebs: Vorontsevich 7 Asts: Teodosić 7 PIR: de Colo 17	Boxscore	Pts: Jackson 24; Rebs: Hendrix 9 Asts: Marković 7 PIR: Kuzminskas 30	Arena: USH CSKA; Attendance: 4,863; Referees: Borys Rhyzhyk (UKR), Tolga Sahin (ITA), Sašo Petek (SLO)

13 November 2015	Banco di Sardegna Sassari (Italy)	73–90	(Germany) Brose Baskets	Sassari, Italy
20:30 (CET)	Scoring by quarter: 21–14, 13–22, 19–24, 20–30
	Pts: Eyenga, Haynes 14; Rebs: Eyenga, Petway 4 Asts: Eyenga 5 PIR: Eyenga 21	Boxscore	Pts: Melli 26; Rebs: Melli 8 Asts: Wanamaker 8 PIR: Melli 37	Arena: PalaSerradimigni; Attendance: 3,525; Referees: Sreten Radović (CRO), Spiros Gkontas (GRE), David Romano (ISR)

19 November 2015	Maccabi Tel Aviv (Israel)	82–88	(Russia) CSKA Moscow	Tel Aviv, Israel
20:05 (CET)	Scoring by quarter: 18–13, 19–25, 26–27, 19–23
	Pts: Rochestie 20; Rebs: Mbakwe, Onuaku 6 Asts: Ohayon 9 PIR: Randle 20	Boxscore	Pts: Teodosić 25; Rebs: Hines 9 Asts: de Colo, Teodosić 5 PIR: Teodosić 24	Arena: Menora Mivtachim Arena; Attendance: 11,060; Referees: Ilija Belošević (SRB), Benjamín Jiménez (ESP), Tomislav Hordov (CRO)

20 November 2015	Brose Baskets (Germany)	73–53	(Spain) Unicaja	Bamberg, Germany
20:00 (CET)	Scoring by quarter: 14–17, 26–12, 20–8, 13–16
	Pts: Strēlnieks 14; Rebs: Melli 8 Asts: Strēlnieks 6 PIR: Strēlnieks, Wanamaker 16	Boxscore	Pts: three players 9 Rebs: Hendrix 6 Asts: Smith 5 PIR: Hendrix 18	Arena: Brose Arena; Attendance: 6,800; Referees: Milivoje Jovčić (SRB), Boris Shulga (UKR), Ersan Kartal (TUR)

20 November 2015	Banco di Sardegna Sassari (Italy)	60–68	(Turkey) Darüşşafaka Doğuş	Sassari, Italy
21:00 (CET)	Scoring by quarter: 16–12, 14–25, 11–19, 19–12
	Pts: Alexander 17; Rebs: Varnado 5 Asts: Logan 7 PIR: Alexander 15	Boxscore	Pts: Harangody 26; Rebs: Harangody 13; Asts: Preldžić 7 PIR: Harangody 35	Arena: PalaSerradimigni; Attendance: 3,145; Referees: Borys Rhyzhyk (UKR), Sašo Petek (SLO), Moritz Reiter (GER)

26 November 2015	Unicaja (Spain)	82–68	(Israel) Maccabi Tel Aviv	Málaga, Spain
20:45 (CET)	Scoring by quarter: 26–20, 22–11, 15–18, 19–19
	Pts: Thomas 20; Rebs: Hendrix 12; Asts: Jackson, Smith 4 PIR: Thomas 24	Boxscore	Pts: three players 13; Rebs: Mbakwe 10; Asts: Rochestie 4 PIR: Rochestie 16	Arena: Martín Carpena; Attendance: 8,548; Referees: Eddie Viator (FRA), Jakub Zamojski (POL), Recep Ankaralı (TUR)

27 November 2015	CSKA Moscow (Russia)	93–87	(Italy) Banco di Sardegna Sassari	Moscow, Russia
18:45 (CET)	Scoring by quarter: 25–26, 25–19, 20–13, 23–29
	Pts: Teodosić 21; Rebs: Vorontsevich 8 Asts: Higgins 4 PIR: de Colo 26	Boxscore	Pts: Logan 21; Rebs: Eyenga 7 Asts: four players 3 PIR: Eyenga 23	Arena: USH CSKA; Attendance: 4,437; Referees: Damir Javor (SLO), Elias Koromilas (GRE), Marcin Kowalski (POL)

27 November 2015	Darüşşafaka Doğuş (Turkey)	54–65	(Germany) Brose Baskets	Istanbul, Turkey
20:45 (CET)	Scoring by quarter: 17–17, 12–15, 12–18, 13–15
	Pts: Gordon 13; Rebs: Aldemir 5 Asts: Redding 4 PIR: Slaughter 16	Boxscore	Pts: Theis 13; Rebs: Melli 12; Asts: Wanamaker 4 PIR: Melli 18	Arena: Volkswagen Arena; Attendance: 3,852; Referees: Fernando Rocha (POR), Benjamín Jiménez (ESP), Milija Vojinović (SRB)

3 December 2015	Banco di Sardegna Sassari (Italy)	74–76	(Israel) Maccabi Tel Aviv	Sassari, Italy
19:00 (CET)	Scoring by quarter: 15–20, 18–20, 19–17, 22–19
	Pts: Haynes 26; Rebs: Sachetti 8 Asts: Eyenga 4 PIR: Haynes 30	Boxscore	Pts: Landesberg 19; Rebs: Mbakwe 9 Asts: Rochestie 9 PIR: Rochestie 20	Arena: PalaSerradimigni; Attendance: 3,318; Referees: Saša Pukl (SLO), Milivoje Jovčić (SRB), Carlos Peruga (ESP)

3 December 2015	Brose Baskets (Germany)	88–100	(Russia) CSKA Moscow	Bamberg, Germany
20:00 (CET)	Scoring by quarter: 20–26, 27–25, 23–28, 18–21
	Pts: Melli 16; Rebs: Theis 6 Asts: Wanamaker 9 PIR: Melli 21	Boxscore	Pts: de Colo 27; Rebs: Kurbanov 10; Asts: de Colo 11; PIR: de Colo 33	Arena: Brose Arena; Attendance: 6,800; Referees: Emilio Pérez Pizarro (ESP), Seffi Shemmesh (ISR), Saverio Lanzarini (ITA)

4 December 2015	Darüşşafaka Doğuş (Turkey)	63–57	(Spain) Unicaja	Istanbul, Turkey
20:45 (CET)	Scoring by quarter: 20–15, 10–13, 15–20, 18–9
	Pts: Redding 19; Rebs: Erden 6 Asts: Wilkebin 4 PIR: Redding 21	Boxscore	Pts: Nedović 13; Rebs: Suárez, Thomas 7 Asts: Nedović, Smith 3 PIR: Nedović 13	Arena: Volkswagen Arena; Attendance: 4,080; Referees: Ilija Belošević (SRB), Spiros Gkontas (GRE), Matej Boltauzer (SLO)

10 December 2015	Maccabi Tel Aviv (Israel)	85–65	(Germany) Brose Baskets	Tel Aviv, Israel
20:05 (CET)	Scoring by quarter: 22−10, 19−18, 29−22, 15−15
	Pts: Landesberg 19; Rebs: Mbakwe 9 Asts: Rochestie 7 PIR: Smith, Mbakwe 18	Boxscore	Pts: Theis 13; Rebs: Theis, Harris 6 Asts: Melli, Wanamaker 3 PIR: Strēlnieks 11	Arena: Menora Mivtachim Arena; Attendance: 11,060; Referees: Sreten Radović (CRO), Miguel Ángel Pérez Pérez (ESP), Sašo Petek (SLO)

10 December 2015	Banco di Sardegna Sassari (Italy)	65–77	(Spain) Unicaja	Sassari, Italy
20:30 (CET)	Scoring by quarter: 23−26, 16−22, 12−15, 14−14
	Pts: Alexander 19; Rebs: Alexander, Varnado 5 Asts: Haynes 6 PIR: Alexander 21	Boxscore	Pts: Smith 20; Rebs: Hendrix 7 Asts: Marković 4 PIR: Smith 21	Arena: PalaSerradimigni; Attendance: 2,988; Referees: Oļegs Latiševs (LAT), Milija Vojinović (SRB), Seffi Shemmesh (ISR)

11 December 2015	CSKA Moscow (Russia)	94–66	(Turkey) Darüşşafaka Doğuş	Moscow, Russia
18:00 (CET)	Scoring by quarter: 24−19, 27−22, 29−7, 14−18
	Pts: de Colo 14; Rebs: de Colo 7 Asts: Teodosić 9 PIR: de Colo 19	Boxscore	Pts: Redding 12; Rebs: Aldemir 5 Asts: Yağmur, Çetin 4 PIR: Harangody, Bjelica 11	Arena: USH CSKA; Attendance: 4570; Referees: Saša Pukl (SLO), Vicente Bultó (ESP), Sergey Zashchuk (UKR)

17 December 2015	Darüşşafaka Doğuş (Turkey)	66–70	(Israel) Maccabi Tel Aviv	Istanbul, Turkey
19:30 (CET)	Scoring by quarter: 23–19, 12–19, 14–12, 17–20
	Pts: Aldemir 12; Rebs: Bjelica 9 Asts: Redding, Wilbekin 4 PIR: Bjelica 16	Boxscore	Pts: Landesberg 14; Rebs: Mbakwe 10; Asts: Rochestie 5 PIR: Mbakwe 19	Arena: Volkswagen Arena; Attendance: 4,926; Referees: Daniel Hierrezuelo (ESP), Panagiotis Anastopoulos (GRE), Marko Juras (SRB)

17 December 2015	Brose Baskets (Germany)	86–54	(Italy) Banco di Sardegna Sassari	Bamberg, Germany
20:00 (CET)	Scoring by quarter: 20–14, 29–19, 18–14, 19–7
	Pts: Zisis 16; Rebs: Radošević 9 Asts: Zisis 5 PIR: Zisis 23	Boxscore	Pts: Haynes 14; Rebs: Eyenga, Sacchetti 7 Asts: Haynes 2 PIR: Eyenga 17	Arena: Brose Arena; Attendance: 6,800; Referees: Christos Christodoulou (GRE), Antonio Conde (ESP), Piotr Pastusiak (POL)

18 December 2015	Unicaja (Spain)	76–88	(Russia) CSKA Moscow	Málaga, Spain
20:45 (CET)	Scoring by quarter: 24–20, 22–22, 11–23, 19–23
	Pts: Jackson 15; Rebs: Vázquez 5 Asts: Jackson 5 PIR: Jackson 18	Boxscore	Pts: de Colo 18; Rebs: Freeland 6 Asts: de Colo 7 PIR: de Colo 23	Arena: Martín Carpena; Attendance: 9,120; Referees: Fernando Rocha (POR), Borys Rhyzhyk (UKR), Tolga Sahin (ITA)
