= 2015–16 Fenerbahçe S.K. (basketball) season =

Fenerbahçe
2015–16 season
- Chairman: (Turkey) Aziz Yıldırım
- Head coach: (Serbia) Željko Obradović
- Arena: Ülker Sports Arena
- Basketball Super League: 2nd seed
- Playoffs: Champions
- Euroleague: Runners-up
- Turkish Cup: Champions
- PIR leader: (United States) Udoh 15.5
- Scoring leader: (Serbia) Bogdanović 12.9
- Rebounding leader: (Czech Republic) Veselý 6.1
- Assists leader: (Turkey) Dixon 3.6
Home	Away	Third

The 2015–16 season was Fenerbahçe's 102nd season in the existence of the club. The team played in the TBL and in the Euroleague.

== Players ==
=== Squad information ===
Fenerbahçe roster
Players
Coaches

Pos.	No.	Nat.	Name	Ht.	Wt.	Age
PG	23	(Turkey)	Uğurlu, Berk	1.92 m (6 ft 4 in)	72 kg (159 lb)	20 – 27 April 1996
PG	35	(Turkey)	Dixon, Bobby (DC)	1.78 m (5 ft 10 in)	73 kg (161 lb)	33 – 10 April 1983
G	3	(Georgia (country))	Hickman, Ricky	1.89 m (6 ft 2 in)	88 kg (194 lb)	30 – 1 September 1985
G	16	(Greece)	Sloukas, Kostas	1.90 m (6 ft 3 in)	95 kg (209 lb)	26 – 15 January 1990
G	10	(Turkey)	Mahmutoğlu, Melih (C)	1.91 m (6 ft 3 in)	85 kg (187 lb)	26 – 12 May 1990
SG	13	(Serbia)	Bogdanović, Bogdan	1.98 m (6 ft 6 in)	93 kg (205 lb)	23 – 18 August 1992
SF	18	(Turkey)	Arna, Egehan	2.03 m (6 ft 8 in)	88 kg (194 lb)	19 – 5 January 1997
F	33	(Serbia)	Kalinić, Nikola	2.03 m (6 ft 8 in)	101 kg (223 lb)	24 – 8 November 1991
F	70	(Italy)	Datome, Luigi	2.03 m (6 ft 8 in)	98 kg (216 lb)	28 – 27 November 1987
F	5	(Turkey)	Hersek, Barış	2.08 m (6 ft 10 in)	104 kg (229 lb)	28 – 26 March 1988
F/C	8	(United States)	Udoh, Ekpe	2.08 m (6 ft 10 in)	111 kg (245 lb)	29 – 20 May 1987
C	12	(North Macedonia)	Antić, Pero	2.11 m (6 ft 11 in)	118 kg (260 lb)	33 – 29 July 1982
F	22	(Turkey)	Bayrak, Ercan	2.08 m (6 ft 10 in)	95 kg (209 lb)	18 – 9 July 1997
F/C	24	(Czech Republic)	Veselý, Jan	2.13 m (7 ft 0 in)	110 kg (243 lb)	26 – 24 April 1990

Head coach

- (Serbia) Željko Obradović

Assistant coach(es)

- (Spain) Josep Maria Izquierdo
- (Serbia) Vladimir Androić
- (Turkey) Erdem Can

Athletic trainer(s)

- (Serbia) Predrag Zimonjić
- (Turkey) İlker Belgutay

Physiotherapist(s)

- (Turkey) Sefa Öztürk

Team manager

- (Italy) Maurizio Gherardini
- (Turkey) Ömer Onan
- (Turkey) Cenk Renda

Legend

- (C) Team captain
- Injured

- Roster

=== Players In ===
No.	Pos.	Nat.	Name	Age	Moving from		Type	Ends	Transfer fee	Date	Source
16	G	(Greece)	Kostas Sloukas	25	Olympiacos	(Greece)	Free agent	3	–	June 29, 2015	
12	C	(North Macedonia)	Pero Antić	33	Atlanta Hawks	(United States)	Free agent	2+1	–	June 30, 2015	
5	PF	(Turkey)	Barış Hersek	27	Pınar Karşıyaka	(Turkey)	Free agent	1	–	July 4, 2015	
70	SF	(Italy)	Luigi Datome	27	Boston Celtics	(United States)	Free agent	2	–	July 19, 2015	
35	PG	(Turkey)	Bobby Dixon	32	Pınar Karşıyaka	(Turkey)	Free agent	2	–	July 21, 2015	
8	C	(United States)	Ekpe Udoh	28	Los Angeles Clippers	(United States)	Free agent	1	–	July 29, 2015	
33	SF	(Serbia)	Nikola Kalinić	23	Crvena zvezda	(Serbia)	Transfer	2+1	1 M €	August 12, 2015	

Total spending: ▼€1 M

=== Players Out ===
No.	Pos.	Nat.	Name	Age	Moving to		Type	Transfer fee	Date	Source
17	C	(Turkey)	Ayberk Olmaz	19	TED Ankara Kolejliler	(Turkey)	Loan (3 year)	–	August 29, 2014	
21	C	(Turkey)	Oğuz Savaş	28	Darüşşafaka Doğuş	(Turkey)	Expired contract	–	June 22, 2015	
8	F	(Serbia)	Nemanja Bjelica	27	Minnesota Timberwolves	(United States)	Expired contract	–	July 6, 2015	
1	PG	(Greece)	Nikos Zisis	32	Brose Baskets	(Germany)	Expired contract	–	July 11, 2015	
0	G	(United States)	Andrew Goudelock	26	Xinjiang Flying Tigers	(China)	Expired contract	–	July 14, 2015	
6	PF	(Turkey)	Berkay Candan	22	Trabzonspor B.K.	(Turkey)	Expired contract	–	July 14, 2015	
22	C	(Croatia)	Luka Žorić	30	KK Cedevita	(Croatia)	Opt-out clause on contract	–	July 28, 2015	
15	SF	(Turkey)	Serhat Çetin	29	Darüşşafaka Doğuş	(Turkey)	Negotiated release from contract	–	August 24, 2015	
20	SG	(Turkey)	Can Altıntığ	28	Pınar Karşıyaka	(Turkey)	Negotiated release from contract	–	August 25, 2015	
55	SF	(Turkey)	Emir Preldžić	28	Darüşşafaka Doğuş	(Turkey)	Negotiated release from contract	–	August 25, 2015	
9	C	(Turkey)	Semih Erden	29	Darüşşafaka Doğuş	(Turkey)	Expired contract	–	August 28, 2015	
25	PG	(Turkey)	Kenan Sipahi	20	Pınar Karşıyaka	(Turkey)	Loan (1 year)	–	September 30, 2015	

Source: Eurobasket.com

Total income: ▲€0

Total expenditure: ▼€1 M

== Technical Staff ==
- General Manager (Italy) Maurizio Gherardini
- Assistant General Manager (Turkey) Ömer Onan
- Team Manager (Turkey) Cenk Renda
- Head coach (Serbia) Željko Obradović
- Assistant coach (Spain) Josep Maria Izquierdo
- Assistant coach (Serbia) Vladimir Androić
- Assistant coach (Turkey) Erdem Can
- Conditioning coach (Serbia) Predrag Zimonjić
- Conditioning coach (Turkey) İlker Belgutay
- Physiotherapist (Turkey) Sefa Öztürk

== Kit ==
- Supplier: Nike
- Main sponsor: Ülker
- Back sponsor: Odeabank
- Short sponsor:

Home	Away

== Pre-season and friendlies ==
Euroleague US Tour

October 5, 2015	Brooklyn Nets (United States)	96–101	(Turkey) Fenerbahçe	Barclays Center, New York City
7:30	Scoring by quarter: 26–25, 26–31, 20–26, 24–19
	Pts: Brook Lopez 18; Rebs: Thomas Robinson 16; Asts: Shane Larkin 5	Report	Pts: Jan Veselý 18; Rebs: Ekpe Udoh 8 Asts: Kostas Sloukas 11	Attendance: 6,857

October 9, 2015	Oklahoma City Thunder (United States)	111–81	(Turkey) Fenerbahçe	Chesapeake Energy Arena, Oklahoma City
2:09	Scoring by quarter: 32–21, 26–20, 29–17, 24–23
	Pts: Dion Waiters 19; Rebs: Steven Adams 8 Asts: Durant, Westbrook 5	Report	Pts: Jan Veselý 17; Rebs: Ekpe Udoh 9 Asts: Kostas Sloukas 6

== Competitions ==
=== Overall ===
Competition	Started round	Current position / round	Final position / round	First match	Last match
Turkish Basketball Super League	Matchday 1	Final	Champions	11 October 2015	13 June 2016
Turkish Cup Basketball	Quarterfinals	Final	Champions	17 February 2016	21 February 2016
Euroleague	Regular season	Final	Runners-up	16 October 2015	15 May 2016

Source: Competitions

=== Overview ===
Competition	Record							
Competition	Pld	W	D	L	PF	PA	PD	Win %
Turkish Basketball Super League	30	24	0	6	2,539	2,275	+264	80.00
TBSL Playoffs	12	9	0	3	983	875	+108	75.00
Turkish Basketball Cup	3	3	0	0	238	206	+32	100.00
Euroleague	29	23	0	6	2,299	2,127	+172	79.31
Total	74	59	0	15	6,059	5,483	+576	79.73

Last updated: 14 June 2016
Source: Competitions

=== Turkish Basketball Super League ===
==== League table ====
Pos	Team	Pld	W	L	PF	PA	PD	Pts	Qualification or relegation
1	Anadolu Efes	30	24	6	2543	2255	+288	54	Advance to Playoffs
2	Fenerbahçe	30	24	6	2539	2275	+264	54	Advance to Playoffs
3	Galatasaray	30	22	8	2508	2323	+185	52	Advance to Playoffs
4	Darüşşafaka Doğuş	30	20	10	2319	2173	+146	50	Advance to Playoffs
5	Banvit	30	18	12	2494	2413	+81	48	Advance to Playoffs
6	Pınar Karşıyaka	30	17	13	2430	2345	+85	47	Advance to Playoffs
7	Uşak Sportif	30	16	14	2351	2410	−59	46	Advance to Playoffs
8	Royal Halı Gaziantep	30	15	15	2361	2385	−24	45	Advance to Playoffs
9	Beşiktaş Sompo Japan	30	15	15	2425	2450	−25	45	
10	Demir İnşaat Büyükçekmece	30	14	16	2401	2472	−71	44	
11	Trabzonspor Medical Park	30	12	18	2284	2327	−43	42	
12	Yeşilgiresun Belediye	30	11	19	2354	2469	−115	41	
13	İstanbul BB	30	10	20	2406	2546	−140	40	
14	Rönesans TED Kolejliler	30	9	21	2324	2437	−113	39	
15	Türk Telekom (R)	30	7	23	2407	2568	−161	37	Relegation to TBL
16	Torku Konyaspor (R)	30	6	24	2194	2492	−298	36	Relegation to TBL

Updated to match(es) played on 10 May 2016. Source: TBL
(R) Relegated

==== Playoffs ====
Quarterfinals
1	Anadolu Efes	2
8	Royal Halı Gaziantep	0
4	Darüşşafaka Doğuş	2
5	Banvit	0
2	Fenerbahçe	2
7	Uşak Sportif	0
3	Galatasaray Odeabank	2
6	Pınar Karşıyaka	1

Semifinals
1	Anadolu Efes	3
4	Darüşşafaka Doğuş	0
2	Fenerbahçe	3
3	Galatasaray Odeabank	1

Finals
1	Anadolu Efes	2
2	Fenerbahçe	4

==== Finals ====
Team 1	Agg.	Team 2	1st leg	2nd leg	3rd leg	4th leg	5th leg	6th leg
Fenerbahçe (Turkey)	4–2	(Turkey) Anadolu Efes	87 - 85	70 - 91	84 - 72	101 - 79	80 - 72	91 - 70

Win Loss

3 June 2016	Anadolu Efes (Turkey)	85–87	(Turkey) Fenerbahçe	Istanbul, Turkey
18:00 (CEST)	Scoring by quarter: 23–18, 17–17, 17–23, 28–29
	Pts: Heurtel 23; Rebs: Dunston 11; Asts: Granger 4	Boxscore	Pts: Udoh 13; Rebs: Datome 10; Asts: Bogdanović, Kalinić, Dixon 3	Arena: Abdi İpekçi Arena; Referees: Engin Kennerman, Erşan Kartal, Ahmet Ersan Ergüler

5 June 2016	Anadolu Efes (Turkey)	91–70	(Turkey) Fenerbahçe	Istanbul, Turkey
18:00 (CEST)	Scoring by quarter: 23–29, 24–17, 26–13, 18-11
	Pts: Heurtel, Granger 17; Rebs: Šarić 8 Asts: Heurtel 6	Boxscore	Pts: Udoh, Antić 14; Rebs: Udoh 12; Asts: Bogdanović 4	Arena: Abdi İpekçi Arena; Referees: Murat Biricik, Zafer Yılmaz, Mehmet Serdar Ünal

7 June 2016	Fenerbahçe (Turkey)	84–72	(Turkey) Anadolu Efes	Istanbul, Turkey
17:00 (CEST)	Scoring by quarter: 23–19, 20–14, 14–24, 27-15
	Pts: Bogdanović 15; Rebs: Udoh 9 Asts: Sloukas 3	Boxscore	Pts: Šarić 18; Rebs: Brown, Dunston, Birkan 5 Asts: Heurtel 6	Arena: Ülker Sports Arena; Attendance: 12,917; Referees: Recep Ankaralı, Yener Yılmaz, Ziya Özorhon

9 June 2016	Fenerbahçe (Turkey)	101–89	(Turkey) Anadolu Efes	Istanbul, Turkey
18:00 (CEST)	Scoring by quarter: 26–18, 24–19, 26–16, 25-26
	Pts: Dixon, Datome 21; Rebs: Udoh, Datome 6 Asts: Bogdanović 7	Boxscore	Pts: Šarić 19; Rebs: Šarić 7 Asts: Doğuş 4	Arena: Ülker Sports Arena; Attendance: 12,917; Referees: Mehmet Keseratar, Emin Moğulkoç, Kaan Büyükçil

11 June 2016	Anadolu Efes (Turkey)	80–72	(Turkey) Fenerbahçe	Istanbul, Turkey
17:00 (CEST)	Scoring by quarter: 6-20, 24-17, 22-15, 28-20
	Pts: Heurtel 24; Rebs: Heurtel, Granger 5 Asts: Heurtel, Granger 6	Boxscore	Pts: Datome 19; Rebs: Vesely 15; Asts: Sloukas 6	Arena: Abdi İpekçi Arena; Referees: Recep Ankaralı, Zafer Yılmaz, Yener Yılmaz

13 June 2016	Fenerbahçe (Turkey)	91–70	(Turkey) Anadolu Efes	Istanbul, Turkey
18:00 (CEST)	Scoring by quarter: 24-14, 28-18, 26-11, 13-27
	Pts: Datome 20; Rebs: Udoh 10; Asts: Udoh 6	Boxscore	Pts: Diebler 18; Rebs: Dunston 7 Asts: Doğuş 6	Arena: Ülker Sports Arena; Attendance: 12,917; Referees: Engin Kennerman, Mehmet Keseratar, Ahmet Ersan Ergüler

==== Finals MVP ====
- (Italy) Luigi Datome (Fenerbahçe)

=== Turkish Basketball Cup ===
Quarterfinals; February 17–18
Pınar Karşıyaka	67
Anadolu Efes	66
Fenerbahçe	89
Demir İnşaat Büyükçekmece	69
Galatasaray Odeobank	73
Banvit	74
Darüşşafaka Doğuş	83
Trabzonspor Medical Park	52

Semifinals; February 19
Pınar Karşıyaka	71
Fenerbahçe	82
Banvit	74
Darüşşafaka Doğuş	76

Final; February 21
Fenerbahçe	67
Darüşşafaka Doğuş	65

==== Final ====
Win Loss

21 February 2016	Fenerbahçe	67–65	Darüşşafaka Doğuş	Bursa
18:30	Scoring by quarter: 21–18, 17–15, 18–18, 11–14
	Pts: Bogdanovic 21; Rebs: Vesely 9 Asts: Muhammed 4	Boxscore	Pts: Markoishvili 16; Rebs: Erden 6 Asts: Preldžić 3	Arena: Bursa Atatürk Sport Hall; Referees: Engin Kennerman, Recep Ankaralı, Kaan Büyükçil

Fenerbahçe	Darüşşafaka

==== Final MVP ====
- (Serbia) Bogdanović (Fenerbahçe)

=== Euroleague ===
==== Regular season ====
Pos	Team	Pld	W	L	PF	PA	PD	Qualification	FNB	KHI	CZT	RMB	BAY	SIG
1	(Turkey) Fenerbahçe	10	8	2	770	707	+63	Advance to Top 16	—	88–83	79–61	77–66	74−67	81–64
2	(Russia) Khimki	10	5	5	798	740	+58	Advance to Top 16	68–70	—	91–53	84−70	70–81	88–62
3	(Serbia) Crvena Zvezda Telekom	10	5	5	766	813	−47	Advance to Top 16	60–74	96–91	—	94–88	85–76	81−59
4	(Spain) Real Madrid	10	5	5	854	808	+46	Advance to Top 16	80–73	82–85	98–71	—	101–99	97–65
5	(Germany) Bayern Munich	10	4	6	763	780	−17	Transfer to Eurocup	67–84	69–60	79–90	67–86	—	76–61
6	(France) Strasbourg	10	3	7	711	814	−103	Transfer to Eurocup	91–70	69–78	78–75	93–86	69–82	—

Source: Euroleague

Win Loss

16 October 2015	Fenerbahçe (Turkey)	74–67	(Germany) Bayern Munich	Istanbul, Turkey
18:45 (CEST)	Scoring by quarter: 10–20, 20–19, 22–20, 22–8
	Pts: Datome 15; Rebs: Veselý 11; Asts: Veselý 5 PIR: Veselý 23	Boxscore	Pts: Renfroe, Đedović 14; Rebs: Bryant 7 Asts: Renfroe 4 PIR: Đedović 17	Arena: Ülker Sports Arena; Attendance: 9,386; Referees: Christos Christodoulou (GRE), Matej Boltauzer (SLO), Piotr Pastusiak (POL)

22 October 2015	Strasbourg (France)	91–70	(Turkey) Fenerbahçe	Strasbourg, France
20:45 (CEST)	Scoring by quarter: 21–24, 28–17, 16–17, 26–12
	Pts: Weems 22; Rebs: Golubović 7 Asts: Campbell 7 PIR: Weems 24	Boxscore	Pts: Bogdanović 12; Rebs: Datome, Veselý 5 Asts: Dixon 5 PIR: Antić 15	Arena: Rhénus Sport; Attendance: 6,112; Referees: Miguel Ángel Pérez Pérez (ESP), Srđan Dožai (CRO), Petar Obradović (BIH)

30 October 2015	Fenerbahçe (Turkey)	77–66	(Spain) Real Madrid	Istanbul, Turkey
20:45 (CET)	Scoring by quarter: 20–18, 19–14, 24–24, 14–10
	Pts: Udoh, Datome 15; Rebs: Udoh 6 Asts: Sloukas 6 PIR: Bogdanović 16	Boxscore	Pts: Reyes 15; Rebs: Ayón 10; Asts: Llull 5 PIR: Reyes 19	Arena: Ülker Sports Arena; Attendance: 12,886; Referees: Luigi Lamonica (ITA), Milivoje Jovčić (SRB), Siniša Herceg (CRO)

6 November 2015	Crvena Zvezda (Serbia)	60–74	(Turkey) Fenerbahçe	Belgrade, Serbia
20:00 (CET)	Scoring by quarter: 19–25, 12–20, 11–14, 18–15
	Pts: Štimac 13; Rebs: Štimac 7 Asts: Lazić, Jović 4 PIR: Zirbes, Štimac 12	Boxscore	Pts: Antić 14; Rebs: Antić 7 Asts: Sloukas 3 PIR: Udoh 19	Arena: Kombank Arena; Attendance: 16,203; Referees: Emilio Pérez Pizarro (ESP), Joseph Bissang (FRA), Petros Papapetrou (GRE)

13 November 2015	Fenerbahçe (Turkey)	88–83	(Russia) Khimki	Istanbul, Turkey
20:45 (CET)	Scoring by quarter: 23–21, 26–20, 15–18, 24–24
	Pts: Datome 19; Rebs: Vaselý 9 Asts: Sloukas 6 PIR: Datome 20	Boxscore	Pts: Shved 19; Rebs: Augustine 7 Asts: Koponen 6 PIR: Davis 24	Arena: Ülker Sports Arena; Attendance: 10,879; Referees: Daniel Hierrezuelo (ESP), Carmelo Paternico (ITA), Miloš Koljenšić (MNE)

19 November 2015	Bayern Munich (Germany)	67–84	(Turkey) Fenerbahçe	Munich, Germany
20:00 (CET)	Scoring by quarter: 10–30, 20–20, 18–17, 19–17
	Pts: Đedović 16; Rebs: Bryant 9 Asts: Bryant 4 PIR: Zipser 12	Boxscore	Pts: Dixon 25; Rebs: Udoh 6 Asts: Datome 6 PIR: Dixon 29	Arena: Audi Dome; Attendance: 6,700; Referees: Fernando Rocha (POR), Carlos Cortés (ESP), Tomas Jasevičius (LTU)

26 November 2015	Fenerbahçe (Turkey)	81–64	(France) Strasbourg	Ülker Sports Arena, Istanbul
18:00 (CET)	Scoring by quarter: 22–14, 18–20, 21–13, 20–17
	Pts: Vaselý 20; Rebs: Antić 6 Asts: Datome 5 PIR: Vaselý 25	Boxscore	Pts: Collins, Beaubois, Golubović 14; Rebs: Golubović 7 Asts: Collins 4 PIR: Golubović 17	Attendance: 8,212; Referees: Christos Christodoulou (GRE), Juan Carlos Garcia Gonzalez, (ESP), Piotr Pastusiak (POL)

3 December 2015	Real Madrid (Spain)	80–73	(Turkey) Fenerbahçe	Madrid, Spain
20:45 (CET)	Scoring by quarter: 18–28, 18–17, 20–10, 24–18
	Pts: Llull 17; Rebs: Reyes, Hernangómez 6 Asts: Llull 4 PIR: Ayón 19	Boxscore	Pts: Veselý 20; Rebs: Veselý 8 Asts: Sloukas 6 PIR: Veselý 22	Arena: Barclaycard Center; Attendance: 10,483; Referees: Sreten Radović (CRO), Elias Koromilas (GRE), Jakub Zamojski (POL)

11 December 2015	Fenerbahçe (Turkey)	79–61	(Serbia) Crvena Zvezda	Istanbul, Turkey
20:45 (CET)	Scoring by quarter: 18–20, 21–17, 19–14, 21–10
	Pts: Udoh 13; Rebs: Datome 8 Asts: Sloukas 7 PIR: Udoh, Datome 19	Boxscore	Pts: Simonović 15; Rebs: Miller 11; Asts: Williams 10; PIR: Štimac 11	Arena: Ülker Sports Arena; Attendance: 8634; Referees: Luigi Lamonica (ITA), Benjamin Jimenez (ESP), Jurgis Laurinavicius (LTU)

17 December 2015	Khimki (Russia)	68–70	(Turkey) Fenerbahçe	Moscow, Russia
17:30 (CET)	Scoring by quarter: 26-24, 13-15, 10-11, 19-20
	Pts: Rice 19; Rebs: Augustine 8 Asts: Rice 3 PIR: Dragić 18	Boxscore	Pts: Veselý 19; Rebs: Veselý 6 Asts: Bogdanović, Dixon 5 PIR: Veselý 23	Arena: Krylatskoye Sports Palace; Attendance: 3300; Referees: Damir Javor (SLO), Carmelo Paternico (ITA), Carlos Peruga (ESP)

==== Top 16 ====
Pos	Team	Pld	W	L	PF	PA	PD	Qualification	FNB	LOK	PAO	CZT	EFS	DDI	UNI	CED
1	(Turkey) Fenerbahçe	14	11	3	1095	1032	+63	Advance to Playoffs	—	85–79	82–75	72–65	90–86	77–69	80–59	86–73
2	(Russia) Lokomotiv Kuban	14	9	5	1099	978	+121	Advance to Playoffs	52–55	—	76–67	86–62	78–77	82–58	81–60	87–63
3	(Greece) Panathinaikos	14	9	5	1067	1027	+40	Advance to Playoffs	76–71	84–79	—	63–74	83–78	82–79	68–66	76–60
4	(Serbia) Crvena zvezda Telekom	14	7	7	1038	1060	−22	Advance to Playoffs	65–88	80–66	69–67	—	91–82	61–80	87–73	94–74
5	(Turkey) Anadolu Efes	14	7	7	1121	1106	+15		73–77	61–76	91–86	85–84	—	84–71	87–67	80–76
6	(Turkey) Darüşşafaka Doğuş	14	5	9	1060	1083	−23		100–106	87–86	84–86	69–66	68–72	—	78–55	72–79
7	(Spain) Unicaja	14	4	10	971	1076	−105		71–67	64–82	58–76	72–78	75–85	70–62	—	90–67
8	(Croatia) Cedevita	14	4	10	1038	1127	−89		89–59	75–89	60–78	83–62	84–80	77–83	78–91	—

Source: Euroleague

Win Loss

30 December 2015	Fenerbahçe (Turkey)	82–75	(Greece) Panathinaikos	Istanbul, Turkey
20:00 (CET)	Scoring by quarter: 28-18, 18-25, 16-15, 20-17
	Pts: Udoh 16; Rebs: Udoh 7 Asts: Dixon 5 PIR: Udoh 23	Boxscore	Pts: Raduljica, Gist 14; Rebs: Raduljica, Fotsis 6 Asts: Diamantidis 5 PIR: Raduljica 19	Arena: Ülker Sports Arena; Attendance: 9172; Referees: Emilio Perez Pizarro (ESP), Olegs Latisevs (LAT), Saso Petek (SLO)

8 January 2016	Crvena Zvezda (Serbia)	65–88	(Turkey) Fenerbahçe	Belgrade, Serbia
20:00 (CET)	Scoring by quarter: 20–23, 8–18, 18–22, 19–25
	Pts: Miller 21; Rebs: Zirbes 6 Asts: Kinsey 5 PIR: Miller 27	Boxscore	Pts: Datome 21; Rebs: Veselý 15; Asts: Dixon 11; PIR: Veselý 25	Arena: Pionir; Attendance: 6,421; Referees: Daniel Hierrezuelo (ESP), Petri Mäntylä (FIN), Ioannis Foufis (GRE)

14 January 2016	Fenerbahçe (Turkey)	85–79	(Russia) Lokomotiv Kuban	Istanbul, Turkey
20:00 (CET)	Scoring by quarter: 20–18, 17–27, 14–15, 34–19
	Pts: Bogdanović 18; Rebs: Veselý 7 Asts: Bogdanović 5 PIR: Veselý 23	Boxscore	Pts: Claver 21; Rebs: Singleton 9 Asts: Delaney 7 PIR: Claver 24	Arena: Ülker Sports Arena; Attendance: 10,397; Referees: Juan Carlos García González (ESP), Spiros Gkontas (GRE), Tomislav Hordov (CRO)

22 January 2016	Darüşşafaka Doğuş (Turkey)	100–106	(Turkey) Fenerbahçe	Istanbul, Turkey
19:00 (CET)	Scoring by quarter: 24–37, 27–25, 22–24, 27–20
	Pts: Harangody 22; Rebs: Harangody 6 Asts: Redding 4 PIR: Harangody 24	Boxscore	Pts: Dixon 24; Rebs: Veselý 13; Asts: Bogdanović 5 PIR: Veselý 30	Arena: Volkswagen Arena; Attendance: 4,895; Referees: Saša Pukl (SLO), Benjamín Jiménez (ESP), Seffi Shemmesh (ISR)

28 January 2016	Fenerbahçe (Turkey)	86–73	(Croatia) Cedevita	Istanbul, Turkey
19:30 (CET)	Scoring by quarter: 27-12, 13-21, 22-28, 24-12
	Pts: Datome 19; Rebs: Veselý 6 Asts: Hickman 6 PIR: Datome 22	Boxscore	Pts: White, Bilan 13; Rebs: Arapović 8 Asts: White 4 PIR: White 16	Arena: Ülker Sports Arena; Attendance: 12,133; Referees: Borys Ryzhyk (UKR), Vicente Bulto (ESP), Marcin Kowalski(POL)

5 February 2016	Anadolu Efes (Turkey)	73–77	(Turkey) Fenerbahçe	Istanbul, Turkey
19:30 (CET)	Scoring by quarter: 21–19, 20–17, 16–20, 16–22
	Pts: Osman, Šarić 15; Rebs: Dunston 6 Asts: Granger 7 PIR: Osman 17	Boxscore	Pts: Bogdanović, Udoh 15; Rebs: Veselý 7 Asts: Dixon 4 PIR: Udoh 20	Arena: Abdi İpekçi Arena; Attendance: 8,685; Referees: Christos Christodoulou (GRE), Daniel Hierrezuelo (ESP), Piotr Pastusiak (POL)

11 February 2016	Fenerbahçe (Turkey)	80–59	(Spain) Unicaja	Istanbul, Turkey
19:30 (CET)	Scoring by quarter: 16-15, 25-13, 20-17, 19-14
	Pts: Datome 13; Rebs: Udoh 10; Asts: Dixon 5 PIR: Udoh 29	Boxscore	Pts: Nelson 11; Rebs: Thomas 7 Asts: Nedović, Nelson 3 PIR: Nelson 14	Arena: Ülker Sports Arena; Attendance: 11,439; Referees: Robert Lottermoser (GER), Milija Vojinovic (SRB), Damir Javor (SLO)

25 February 2016	Panathinaikos (Greece)	76–71	(Turkey) Fenerbahçe	Athens, Greece
20:15 (CET)	Scoring by quarter: 15–20, 21–16, 19–17, 21–18
	Pts: Williams 14; Rebs: Kuzmić 8 Asts: Diamantidis 7 PIR: Raduljica 13	Boxscore	Pts: Udoh 19; Rebs: Udoh, Veselý 7 Asts: Bogdanović, Datome 3 PIR: Udoh 24	Arena: Olympic Sports Center Athens; Attendance: 18,200; Referees: Juan Carlos García González (ESP), Carmelo Paternico (ITA), Sašo Petek (SLO)

4 March 2016	Fenerbahçe (Turkey)	72–65	(Serbia) Crvena Zvezda	Istanbul, Turkey
19:30 (CET)	Scoring by quarter: 14–18, 11–16, 24–6, 23–25
	Pts: Datome 27; Rebs: Bogdanović 7 Asts: Dixon 6 PIR: Datome 29	Boxscore	Pts: Zirbes 11; Rebs: Zirbes 7 Asts: Micić 4 PIR: Simonović 14	Arena: Ülker Sports Arena; Attendance: 10,694; Referees: Miguel Ángel Pérez Pérez (ESP), Spiros Gkontas (GRE), Marcin Kowalski (POL)

10 March 2016	Lokomotiv Kuban (Russia)	52–55	(Turkey) Fenerbahçe	Krasnodar, Russia
18:00 (CET)	Scoring by quarter: 13–17, 12–13, 19–13, 8–12
	Pts: Claver, Delaney 12; Rebs: Claver 12; Asts: Delaney 5 PIR: Claver 18	Boxscore	Pts: Bogdanović 17; Rebs: Datome 8 Asts: Dixon 4 PIR: Bogdanović 20	Arena: Basket Hall; Attendance: 6,979; Referees: Luigi Lamonica (ITA), Matej Boltauzer (SLO), Emilio Pérez Pizarro (ESP)

17 March 2016	Fenerbahçe (Turkey)	77–69	(Turkey) Darüşşafaka Doğuş	Istanbul, Turkey
19:00 (CET)	Scoring by quarter: 25–21, 20–18, 12–15, 20–15
	Pts: Udoh 18; Rebs: Udoh, Veselý 6 Asts: Bogdanović 4 PIR: Datome, Udoh 21	Boxscore	Pts: Redding 12; Rebs: Harangody 6 Asts: Harangody 3 PIR: Harangody 12	Arena: Ülker Sports Arena; Attendance: 5,980; Referees: Sreten Radović (CRO), Daniel Hierrezuelo (ESP), Seffi Shemmesh (ISR)

25 March 2016	Cedevita (Croatia)	89–59	(Turkey) Fenerbahçe	Zagreb, Croatia
19:00 (CET)	Scoring by quarter: 22–13, 22–17, 27–13, 18–16
	Pts: Arapović 18; Rebs: Žganec 9 Asts: White 5 PIR: White 22	Boxscore	Pts: Udoh 11; Rebs: Antić 6 Asts: Hickman 3 PIR: Hickman, Kalinić 10	Arena: Dražen Petrović Zagreb; Attendance: 2,000; Referees: Christos Christodoulou (GRE), Piotr Pastusiak (POL), Carlos Peruga (ESP)

1 April 2016	Fenerbahçe (Turkey)	90–86	(Turkey) Anadolu Efes	Istanbul, Turkey
19:30 (CEST)	Scoring by quarter: 19–16, 18–18, 29–16, 24–36
	Pts: Datome 24; Rebs: Datome 7 Asts: Dixon 6 PIR: Datome 25	Boxscore	Pts: Heurtel 14; Rebs: Šarić 7 Asts: Heurtel 13; PIR: Heurtel 25	Arena: Ülker Sports Arena; Attendance: 7,043; Referees: Carmelo Paternico (ITA), Vicente Bultó (ESP), Petros Papapetrou (GRE)

8 April 2016	Unicaja (Spain)	71–67	(Turkey) Fenerbahçe	Málaga, Spain
20:45 (CEST)	Scoring by quarter: 23–20, 16–8, 19–20, 13–19
	Pts: Cooley 17; Rebs: Cooley 9 Asts: Jackson, Suárez 4 PIR: Cooley 26	Boxscore	Pts: Antić, Hickman 12; Rebs: Udoh 6 Asts: Hickman 5 PIR: Sloukas 12	Arena: Martín Carpena; Attendance: 4,656; Referees: Luigi Lamonica (ITA), Saša Pukl (SLO), Ioannis Foufis (GRE)

==== Playoffs ====
In the playoffs, teams play against each other which must win three games to win the series. Thus, if one team win three games before all five games have been played, the games that remain are omitted. The team that finished in the higher Top 16 place will be played the first, the second and the fifth (if it is necessary) game of the series at home.

Game 1 was played on 12 April, while Game 2 was played on 14 April. Game 3 was played on 19 April 2016. This playoff series was a rematch of last season's Final Four match-up, where Fenerbahçe would officially be knocked out of championship contention that season.

Team 1	Agg.	Team 2	1st leg	2nd leg	3rd leg
Fenerbahçe (Turkey)	3–0	(Spain) Real Madrid	75–69	100–78	63–75

Win Loss

12 April 2016	Fenerbahçe (Turkey)	75–69	(Spain) Real Madrid	Istanbul, Turkey
19:45 (CEST)	Scoring by quarter: 15–11, 26–18, 12–23, 22–17
	Pts: Bogdanović, Sloukas 17; Rebs: Kalinić, Udoh 7 Asts: Bogdanović 5 PIR: Bogdanović 19	Boxscore	Pts: Reyes 13; Rebs: Ayón 8 Asts: Llull 5 PIR: Llull 16	Arena: Ülker Sports Arena; Attendance: 12,917; Referees: Damir Javor (SLO), Milivoje Jovčić (SRB), Oļegs Latiševs (LAT)

14 April 2016	Fenerbahçe (Turkey)	100–78	(Spain) Real Madrid	Istanbul, Turkey
19:45 (CEST)	Scoring by quarter: 27–14, 27–15, 22–19, 24–30
	Pts: Udoh 18; Rebs: Antić 8 Asts: Sloukas 6 PIR: Udoh 25	Boxscore	Pts: Rodríguez 15; Rebs: Dončić 6 Asts: Fernández 3 PIR: Rodríguez, Dončić 15	Arena: Ülker Sports Arena; Attendance: 12,904; Referees: Christos Christodoulou (GRE), Eddie Viator (FRA), Matej Boltauzer (SLO)

19 April 2016	Real Madrid (Spain)	63–75	(Turkey) Fenerbahçe	Madrid, Spain
20:45 (CEST)	Scoring by quarter: 13–18, 14–12, 13–24, 23–21
	Pts: Ayón 14; Rebs: Ayón 14; Asts: Rodríguez 4 PIR: Ayón 24	Boxscore	Pts: Bogdanović 17; Rebs: Udoh 12; Asts: Sloukas 5 PIR: Udoh 33	Arena: Barclaycard Center; Attendance: 11,349; Referees: Borys Ryzhyk (UKR), Robert Lottermoser (GER), Spiros Gkontas (GRE)

==== Final Four ====
Semifinals
13 May
(Turkey) Fenerbahçe	88
(Spain) Laboral Kutxa	77
13 May
(Russia) CSKA Moscow	88
(Russia) Lokomotiv Kuban	81

Championship game
15 May
(Turkey) Fenerbahçe	96
(Russia) CSKA Moscow	101
Third place game
15 May
(Spain) Laboral Kutxa	75
(Russia) Lokomotiv Kuban	85

===== Semifinal =====
13 May 2016	Fenerbahçe (Turkey)	88–77(OT)	(Spain) Laboral Kutxa	Berlin, Germany
21:00 (CEST)	Scoring by quarter: 23–15, 18–25, 14–17, 17–15, Overtime: 16–5
	Pts: Bogdanović 18; Rebs: Antić, Datome 7 Asts: Sloukas 7 PIR: Sloukas 20	Boxscore	Pts: Bourousis 22; Rebs: Bourousis 10; Asts: Adams 7 PIR: Bourousis 24	Arena: Mercedes-Benz Arena; Attendance: 11,216; Referees: Christos Christodoulou (GRE), Borys Rhyzhyk (UKR), Oļegs Latiševs (LAT)

Starters:			Pts	Reb	Ast
PG	35	(Turkey) Bobby Dixon	3	5	0
SG	13	(Serbia) Bogdan Bogdanović	18	6	3
SF	70	(Italy) Luigi Datome	15	7	2
PF	12	(North Macedonia) Pero Antić	8	7	2
C	8	(United States) Ekpe Udoh	14	2	1
Reserves:					
PG	3	(Georgia (country)) Ricky Hickman	3	1	0
PF	5	(Turkey) Barış Hersek	DNP		
SG	10	(Turkey) Melih Mahmutoğlu	DNP		
PG	16	(Greece) Kostas Sloukas	13	5	7
PG	23	(Turkey) Berk Uğurlu	DNP		
PF	24	(Czech Republic) Jan Veselý	14	3	1
SF	33	(Serbia) Nikola Kalinić	0	2	1
Head coach:
(Basketball Federation of Serbia) Željko Obradović

Fenerbahçe	Laboral Kutxa

Starters:			Pts	Reb	Ast
PG	20	(United States) Darius Adams	19	2	7
SG	8	(Hungary) Ádám Hanga	10	5	0
SF	42	(Latvia) Dāvis Bertāns	2	2	1
PF	14	(France) Kim Tillie	13	3	0
C	6	(Croatia) Darko Planinić	0	2	0
Reserves:					
PG	3	(United States) Mike James	6	2	5
PF	4	(Spain) Mamadou Diop	DNP		
SG	5	(France) Fabien Causeur	0	0	0
C	9	(Greece) Ioannis Bourousis	22	10	2
SF	11	(Slovenia) Jaka Blažič	5	2	1
C	12	(Spain) Ilimane Diop	0	0	0
SF	33	(Spain) Alberto Corbacho	DNP		
Head coach:
(Croatian Basketball Federation) Velimir Perasović

===== Final =====
15 May 2016	Fenerbahçe (Turkey)	96–101(OT)	(Russia) CSKA Moscow	Berlin, Germany
20:00 (CEST)	Scoring by quarter: 20–22, 10–28, 23–19, 30–14, Overtime: 13–18
	Pts: Dixon 17; Rebs: Udoh 11; Asts: Dixon 4 PIR: Udoh 24	Boxscore	Pts: De Colo 22; Rebs: Teodosić, Khryapa 5 Asts: Teodosić, De Colo 7 PIR: Teodosić 29	Arena: Mercedes-Benz Arena; Attendance: 12,250; Referees: Luigi Lamonica (ITA), Robert Lottermoser (GER), Damir Javor (SLO)

Starters:			Pts	Reb	Ast
PG	16	(Greece) Kostas Sloukas	10	2	0
SG	13	(Serbia) Bogdan Bogdanović	6	3	3
SF	33	(Serbia) Nikola Kalinić	3	3	2
PF	70	(Italy) Luigi Datome	16	5	3
C	24	(Czech Republic) Jan Veselý	7	5	1
Reserves:					
PG	3	(Georgia (country)) Ricky Hickman	5	0	0
PF	5	(Turkey) Barış Hersek	DNP		
C	8	(United States) Ekpe Udoh	16	11	3
SG	10	(Turkey) Melih Mahmutoğlu	0	0	0
PF	12	(North Macedonia) Pero Antić	16	1	0
PG	23	(Turkey) Berk Uğurlu	DNP		
PG	35	(Turkey) Bobby Dixon	17	4	1
Head coach:
(Basketball Federation of Serbia) Željko Obradović

Fenerbahçe	CSKA Moscow

Starters:			Pts	Reb	Ast
PG	1	(France) Nando de Colo	22	2	7
SG	22	(United States) Cory Higgins	12	1	3
SF	41	(Russia) Nikita Kurbanov	4	3	0
PF	20	(Russia) Andrey Vorontsevich	11	3	0
C	42	(United States) Kyle Hines	15	4	2
Reserves:					
SG	3	(Russia) Dmitry Kulagin	0	0	0
PG	4	(Serbia) Miloš Teodosić	19	5	7
SG	7	(Russia) Vitaly Fridzon	0	0	0
PF	8	(United States) Demetris Nichols	0	1	0
PG	9	(United States) Aaron Jackson	8	1	1
C	12	(Russia) Pavel Korobkov	0	2	1
PF	31	(Russia) Victor Khryapa	10	5	1
Head coach:
(Hellenic Basketball Federation) Dimitrios Itoudis

==== Individual awards ====
Euroleague MVP of the Month

- (Czech Republic) Jan Veselý, January
- (United States) Ekpe Udoh, April

Euroleague Weekly MVPs

- (Czech Republic) Jan Veselý – Top 16, Week 4
- (Italy) Luigi Datome – Top 16, Week 9
- (United States) Ekpe Udoh – Playoffs, Game 2
- (United States) Ekpe Udoh – Playoffs, Game 3
