= Luka Babić =

Croatian basketball player

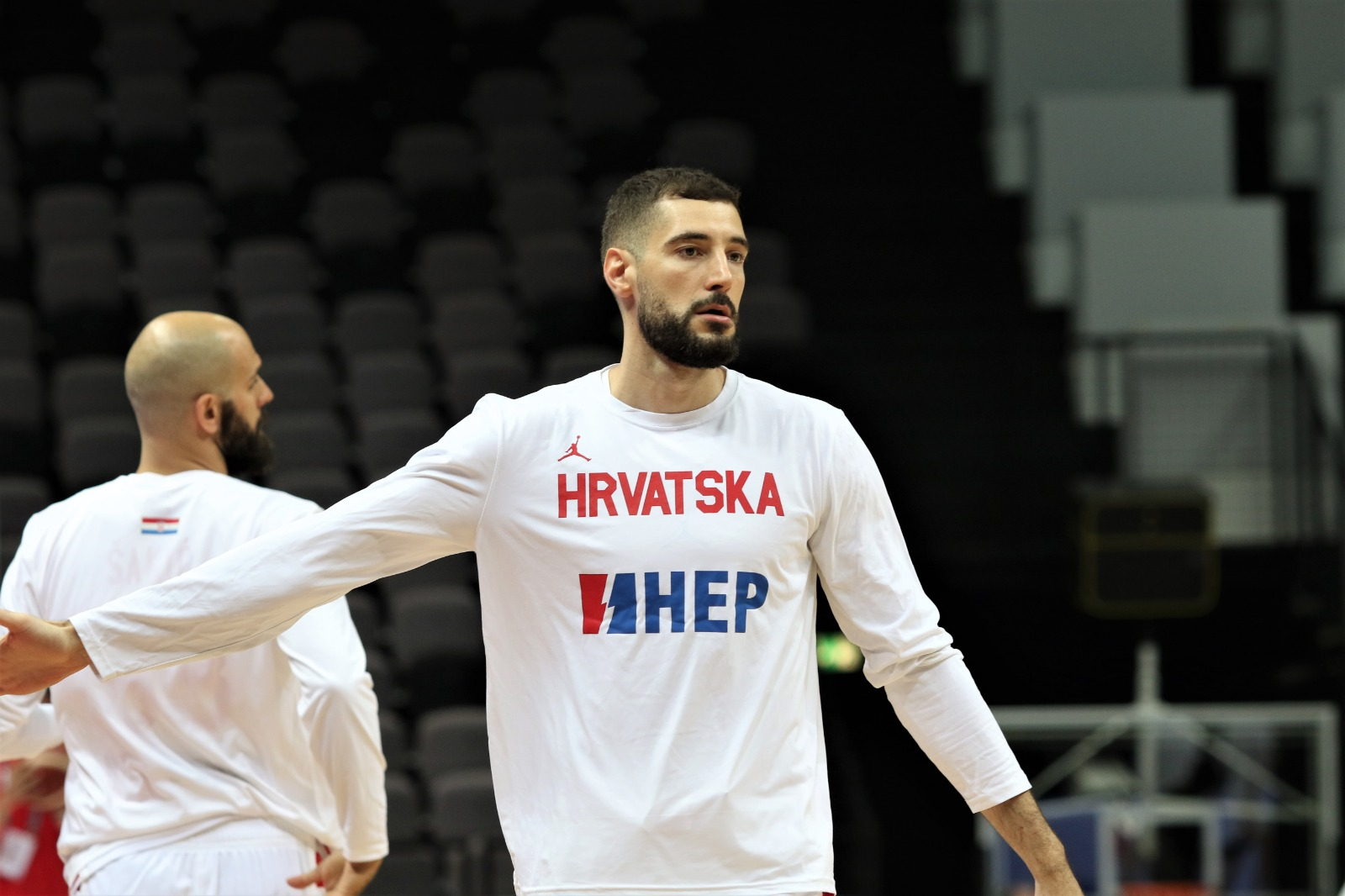

No. 26 – Free agent
- Position: Small forward

Personal information
- Born: 29 September 1991 (age 35) Split, Croatia
- Listed height: 6 ft 7 in (2.01 m)
- Listed weight: 216 lb (98 kg)

Career information
- NBA draft: 2013: undrafted
- Playing career: 2008–present

Career history
- 2008–2012: Split
- 2012–2017: Cedevita
- 2017–2018: ratiopharm Ulm
- 2018–2019: İstanbul BB
- 2019–2020: Ormanspor
- 2021: Split

Career highlights
- 4× Croatian League (2014–2017); 4× Croatian Cup (2014–2017)
Medals
Men's basketball
Representing Croatia
FIBA Under-19 World Championship
Bronze medal – third place	2009 New Zealand

Luka Babić (born 29 September 1991) is a Croatian professional basketball player who last played for Split of the Adriatic League and the Croatian League. Standing at 2.01 m (6 ft 7 in) he plays the small forward position.

== Career ==
On 16 July 2019 Babić was announced by OGM Ormanspor, newcomer in the Basketbol Süper Ligi (BSL) after its promotion.

On 31 January 2021 he signed with Split of the Adriatic League and the Croatian League.
