= Jérémy Leloup =

French basketball player

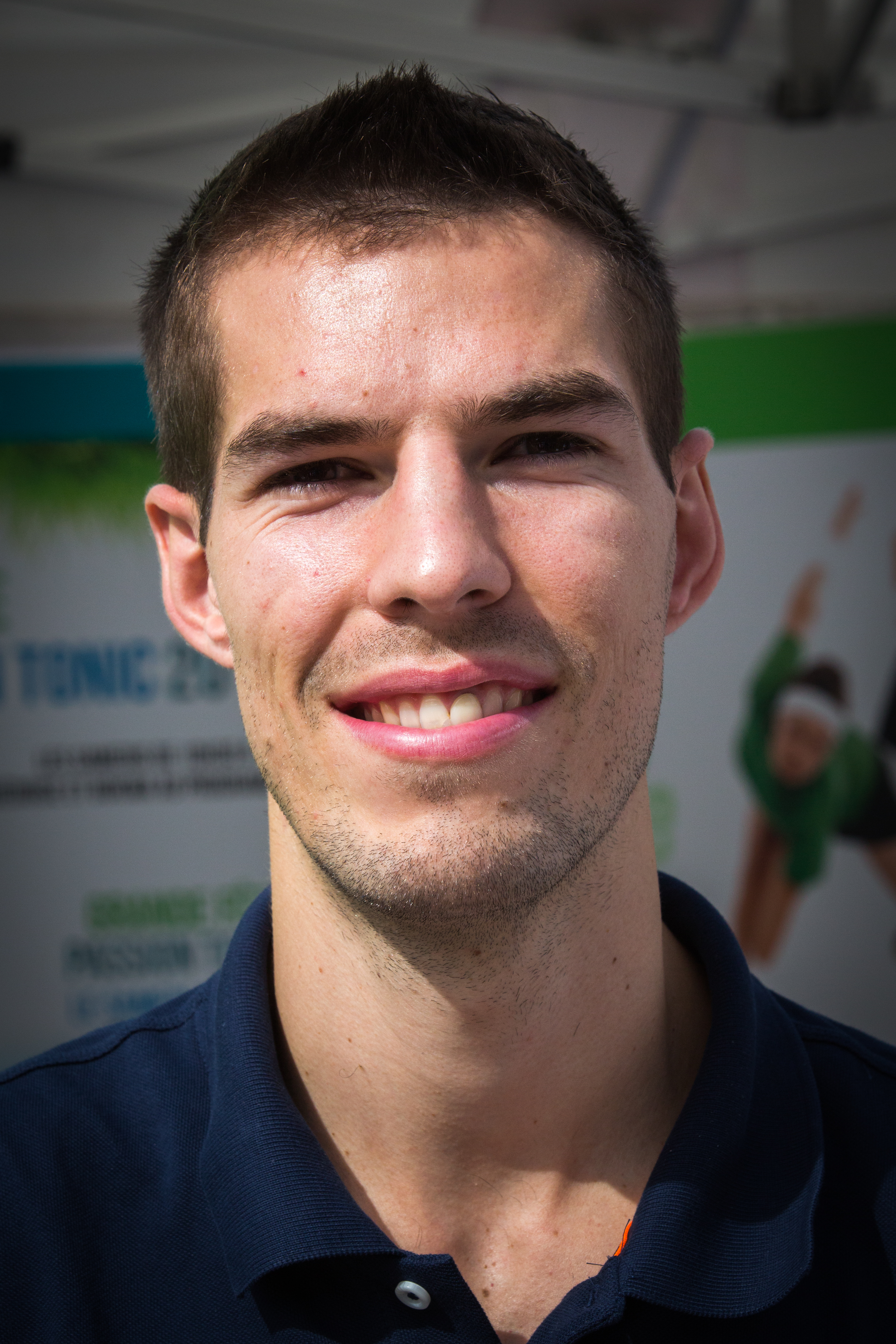
- Leloup in 2013

Free Agent
- Position: Small forward / power forward

Personal information
- Born: January 31, 1987 (age 39) Le Mans, France
- Listed height: 197 cm (6 ft 6 in)

Career information
- NBA draft: 2009: undrafted
- Playing career: 2006–present

Career history
- 2006–2009: Le Mans
- 2009–2010: JA Vichy
- 2010–2013: JDA Dijon
- 2013–2018: SIG Strasbourg
- 2018–2020: JDA Dijon
- 2020–2022: Élan Béarnais
- 2022–2023: Orléans Loiret

Career highlights
- 4× French Cup winner (2009, 2015, 2018, 2022); 3× Leaders Cup winner (2009, 2015, 2020)

Jérémy Leloup (born January 31, 1987) is a French professional basketball player who last played for Orléans Loiret of the LNB Pro B.
