= Fréjus Zerbo =

Ivorian basketball player

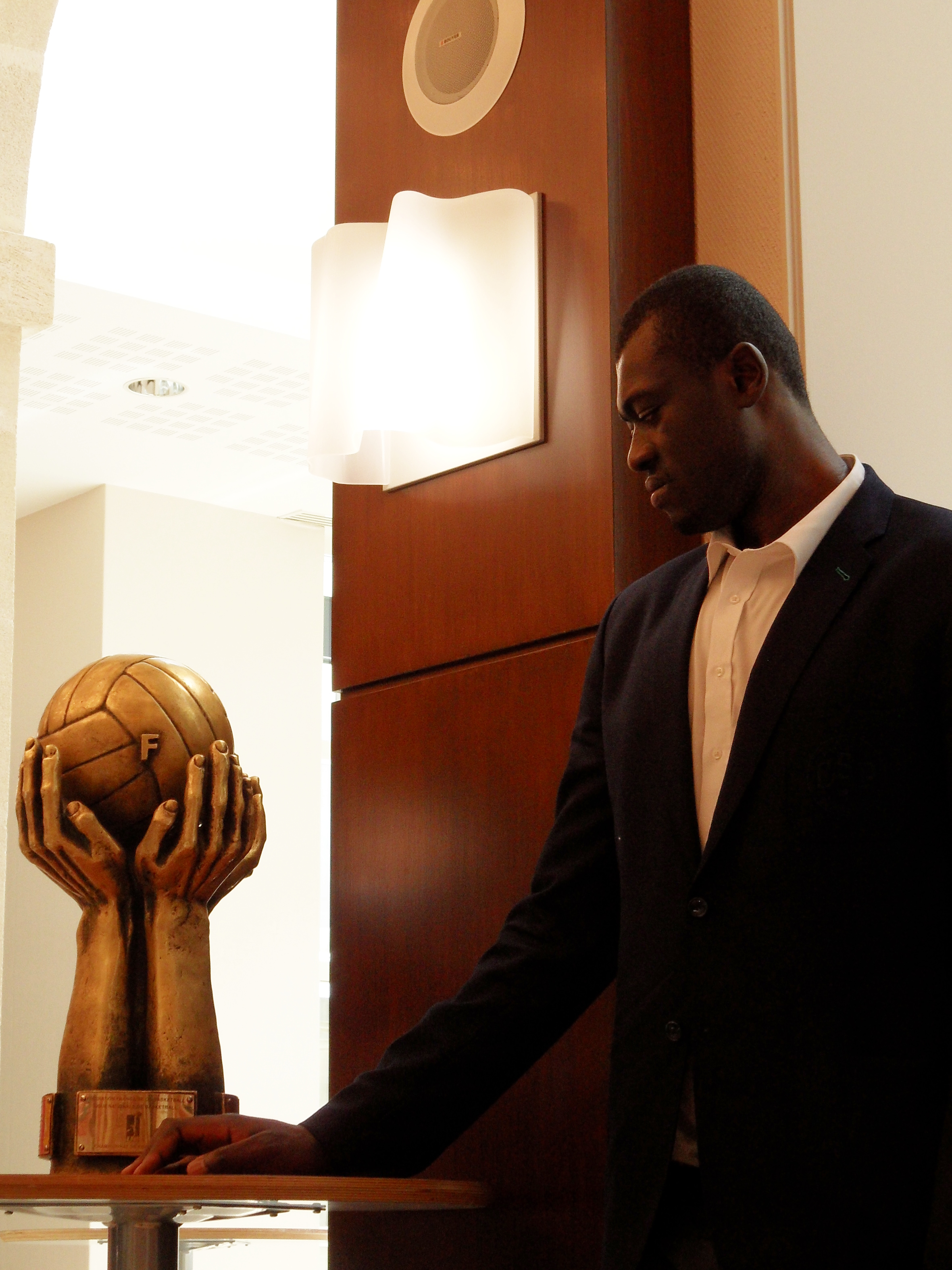

Free Agent
- Position: Center

Personal information
- Born: April 2, 1989 (age 37) Yaba, Burkina Faso
- Listed height: 6 ft 10 in (2.08 m)
- Listed weight: 270 lb (122 kg)

Career information
- NBA draft: 2011: undrafted
- Playing career: 2010–present

Career history
- 2010–2011: BCM Gravelines
- 2011–2018: Limoges CSP
- 2018: →Antibes Sharks
- 2018–2020: JL Bourg
- 2020–2022: Aix Maurienne Savoie

Career highlights
- 2x French League champion (2014, 2015)

Fréjus Zerbo (born April 2, 1989) is a Burkinabé-born Ivorian professional basketball player, who plays as a center and lastly played for LNB Pro B team Aix Maurienne Savoie.

== Professional career ==
In June 2010, Zerbo signed with BCM Gravelines of the French Pro A. In 2011, Zerbo left BCM for Limoges CSP. In June 2014, he re-signed with Limoges. July 2015, Zerbo signed a 5-year extension with Limoges. In January 2018, he was loaned to Antibes Sharks until the end of the season.

On November 15, 2018, he has signed a 1-month deal with Pro A team JL Bourg. His contract has been extended until the end of season on December 28, 2019.

== National team ==
He holds Ivorian passport and lived in Ivory Coast as a child. He opted to represent Ivory Coast national basketball team and was included in a roster for 2019 FIBA World Cup.
