= Maik Zirbes =

German basketball player (born 1990)

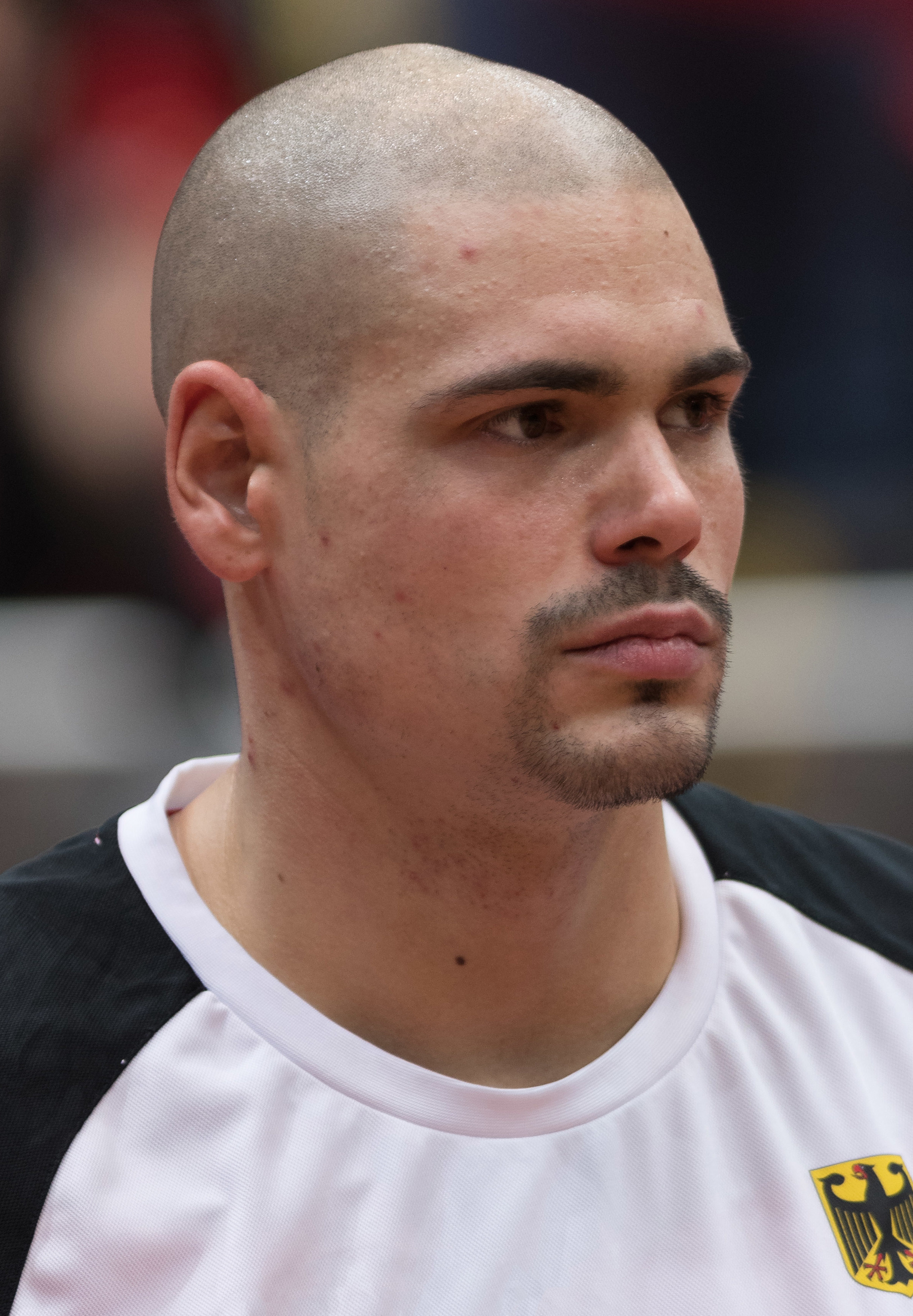
- Zirbes with Germany in 2017

No. 33 – Gladiators Trier
- Position: Center
- League: Basketball Bundesliga

Personal information
- Born: 29 January 1990 (age 35) Traben-Trarbach, West Germany
- Listed height: 2.08 m (6 ft 10 in)
- Listed weight: 121 kg (267 lb)

Career information
- NBA draft: 2012: undrafted
- Playing career: 2007–present

Career history
- 2007–2012: TBB Trier
- 2010: →Saar-Pfalz Braves
- 2012–2014: Brose Baskets
- 2014–2016: Crvena zvezda
- 2016–2017: Maccabi Tel Aviv
- 2017: →Bayern Munich
- 2017–2018: Bayern Munich
- 2018–2019: Crvena zvezda
- 2019: Guangxi Rhinos
- 2019–2020: Cedevita Olimpija
- 2020–2021: Shabab Al Ahli
- 2021–2022: Crvena zvezda
- 2022–2023: Benfica
- 2023–present: Gladiators Trier

Career highlights
- 4× ABA League champion (2015, 2016, 2019, 2022); 2× German League champion (2013, 2018); 3× Serbian League champion (2015, 2016, 2022); Portuguese League champion (2023); Serbian Cup winner (2015); German Cup winner (2018); Adriatic Supercup winner (2018); Portuguese Cup winner (2023); BBL Most Improved Player (2012); BBL Best German Young Player (2012); 2× BBL All-Star (2012–2013); All-ABA League Team (2016)

Maik Zirbes (born 29 January 1990) is a German professional basketball player for Gladiators Trier of the Basketball Bundesliga. He also represents the senior German national basketball team in the international competitions. Standing at 2.08 m (6 ft 10 in), he plays the center position.

== Early career ==
Zirbes first played soccer, but opted to focus on basketball when he was 12 years old. He started his basketball career in the youth set up of TBB Trier before signing his first professional contract with TBB at the age of 17. In the 2008–09 campaign, Zirbes was named Most Valuable Player of the German youth league NBBL.

== Professional career ==
Zirbes played with TBB Trier until signing a three-year contract with Brose Baskets in June 2012.

On 5 August 2014, Zirbes signed a two-year deal with the Serbian team Crvena zvezda. In his first 2014–15 season with the club, Crvena zvezda won the Adriatic League championship, the Serbian League championship and the Radivoj Korać Cup. In June 2015, he exercised his player option for the 2015–16 season.

On 13 June 2016, Zirbes signed a two-year contract with the Israeli club Maccabi Tel Aviv. On 24 January 2017, Zirbes returned to Germany and signed with Bayern Munich on loan, till the end of the season. On 30 July 2017 Zirbes signed a two-year contract extension with Bayern Munich.

On 17 July 2018, Zirbes returned to Crvena zvezda. During his one-year stint with KK Crvena zvezda, Zirbes averaged 7.7 points and 4 rebounds in just over 15 minutes per game. His best game was on 8 October 2018 in a 87–71 win against KK Budućnost in the round 2 of the ABA League regular season, where he scored 19 points and grabbed 6 rebounds in 22 minutes. After being cut from the roster for the Basketball League of Serbia, on 3 May 2019, Zirbes signed for the Guangxi Rhinos of the National Basketball League (China).

On 26 September 2019, Zirbes signed with Cedevita Olimpija of the Slovenian League.

On 12 July 2020, Zirbes signed with Shabab Al Ahli of the UAE National Basketball League. On 15 September 2021, he signed with Crvena zvezda until the end of 2021, with an option to extend it for the season. He left the Zvezda on 21 June 2022. In August 2022, Zirbes signed for Benfica of the Liga Portuguesa de Basquetebol. In September 2023, he signed with Gladiators Trier of the German ProA.

== National team career ==
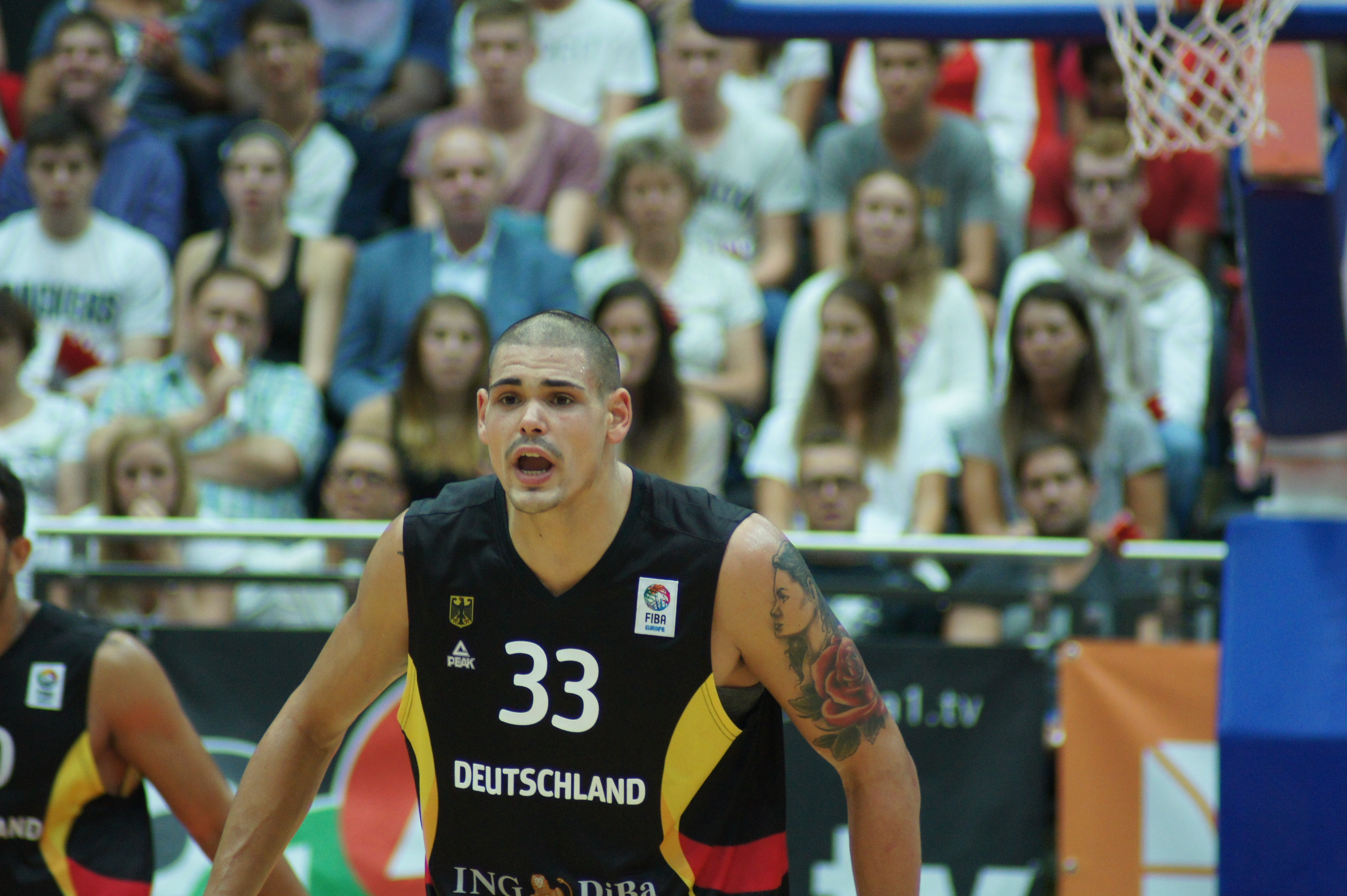
Zirbes playing with Germany during the EuroBasket 2015 qualifiers in August 2014

Zirbes represented the German Junior National Teams at the 2008 FIBA Europe Under-18 Championship and the 2010 FIBA Europe Under-20 Championship. He was handed his first cap with the senior German national basketball team in August 2009, when Germany took on the Netherlands. In 2013, Zirbes was a member of Germany's roster at the 2013 EuroBasket, in Slovenia.

== Career statistics ==
Legend
| GP | Games played | GS | Games started | MPG | Minutes per game |
| FG% | Field-goal percentage | 3P% | 3-point field-goal percentage | FT% | Free-throw percentage |
| RPG | Rebounds per game | APG | Assists per game | SPG | Steals per game |
| BPG | Blocks per game | PPG | Points per game | PIR | Performance index rating |
| **Bold** | Career high |

=== EuroLeague ===
| Year | Team | GP | GS | MPG | FG% | 3P% | FT% | RPG | APG | SPG | BPG | PPG | PIR |
|---|---|---|---|---|---|---|---|---|---|---|---|---|---|
| 2012–13 | Bamberg | 23 | 23 | 19.7 | .535 | .000 | **.786** | 5.0 | .6 | .7 | .4 | 8.2 | 7.7 |
| 2013–14 | Bamberg | 10 | 9 | 18.8 | .508 | .000 | .652 | 4.8 | **.7** | .1 | .2 | 8.1 | 6.7 |
| 2014–15 | Crvena zvezda | 24 | 0 | 13.0 | .622 | .000 | .688 | 3.3 | .3 | .5 | .4 | 5.2 | 6.2 |
| 2015–16 | Crvena zvezda | **27** | **26** | **25.2** | .604 | .000 | .677 | **6.1** | **.7** | **.9** | **.6** | **12.4** | **14.3** |
| 2016–17 | Maccabi | 15 | 2 | 15.2 | **.682** | .000 | .780 | 3.0 | .3 | .3 | .3 | 8.1 | 8.1 |
| Career | | 84 | 58 | 19.4 | .574 | .000 | .691 | 4.8 | .6 | .4 | .4 | 8.7 | 9.3 |

== See also ==
- List of KK Crvena zvezda players with 100 games played
