= 2015–16 Euroleague =

EuroLeague season

2015–16 Turkish Airlines Euroleague^{1}
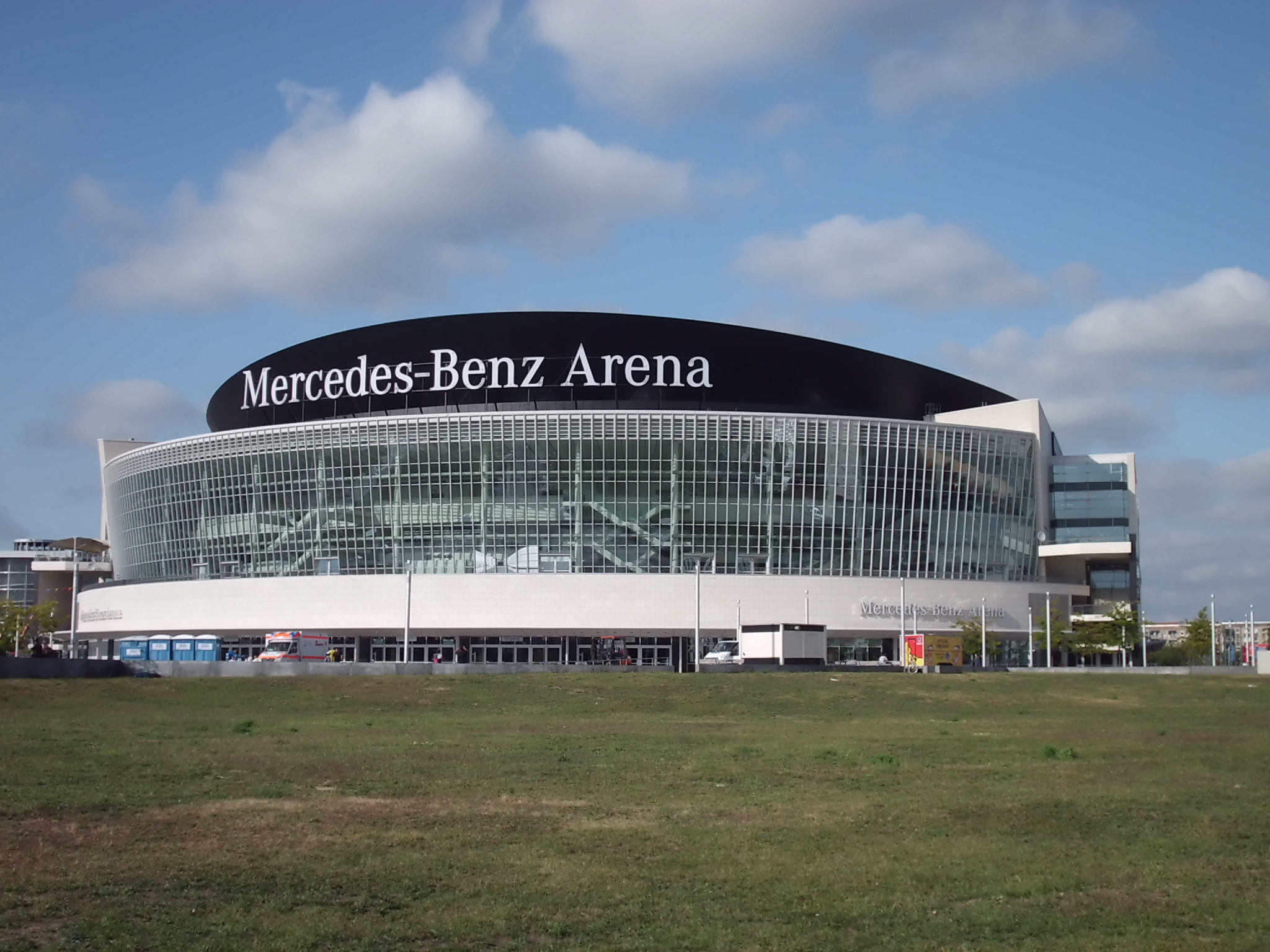
- The Mercedes-Benz Arena in Berlin hosted the Final Four
- Season: 2015–16
- Duration: 15 October 2015 – 15 May 2016 (competition proper)
- Games played: 250
- Teams: 24

Regular season
- Season MVP: (France) Nando de Colo

Finals
- Champions: (Russia) CSKA Moscow (7th title)
- Runners-up: (Turkey) Fenerbahçe
- Third place: (Russia) Lokomotiv Kuban
- Fourth place: (Spain) Laboral Kutxa
- Final Four MVP: (France) Nando de Colo

Major awards
- Best Defender: (United States) Kyle Hines
- Rising Star: (Spain) Alex Abrines
- Coach of the Year: (Greece) Dimitris Itoudis

Statistical leaders
Points	(France) Nando de Colo	19.4
Rebounds	(Greece) Ioannis Bourousis	8.7
Assists	(France) Thomas Heurtel	7.9
Index Rating	(France) Nando de Colo	24.3

Records
- Biggest home win: Khimki 91–53 Crvena zvezda (30 October 2015)
- Biggest away win: Limoges 71–107 Laboral Kutxa (29 October 2015)
- Highest scoring: Darüşşafaka 100–106 Fenerbahçe (22 January 2016)
- Winning streak: 9 games Fenerbahçe
- Losing streak: 10 games Dinamo Sassari
- Highest attendance: 18,150; Crvena zvezda 69–67 Panathinaikos (11 March 2016)
- Lowest attendance: 1,497; Cedevita 83–62 Crvena zvezda (8 April 2016)
- Attendance: 1,832,920
- Average attendance: 7,332 ▼
- All statistics correct as of 15 May 2016.^{1} Sponsored league name, referring to Turkish Airlines.

The 2015–16 Turkish Airlines Euroleague was the 16th season of the modern era of Euroleague Basketball and the sixth under the title sponsorship of the Turkish Airlines. Including the competition's previous incarnation as the FIBA Europe Champions Cup, this was the 59th season of the premier competition for European men's professional basketball clubs.

The 2016 Euroleague Final was played between CSKA Moscow and Fenerbahçe at the Mercedes-Benz Arena in Berlin, Germany. CSKA Moscow defeated Fenerbahçe 101–96 on extra time in the final to win their seventh European Cup/Euroleague title. Real Madrid were the title holders, but they were eliminated by Fenerbahçe in the playoffs.

== Team allocation ==
A total of 24 teams participated in the 2015–16 Euroleague.

=== Distribution ===
The table below shows the default access list.

	Teams entering in this round	Teams advancing from previous round
Regular season (24 teams)	11 A–licences; 8 B–licences; 5 champions from Adriatic, Germany, Italy, France, Poland; 2 runners-up from Russia and Adriatic; 1 third-placed team from Spain; 1 C–licence; Eurocup champion; 4 wild card	
Top 16 (16 teams)		4 group winners from the regular season; 4 group runners-up from the regular season; 4 group third-placed teams from the regular season; 4 group fourth-placed teams from the regular season
Playoffs (8 teams)		2 group winners from the Top 16; 2 group runners-up from the Top 16; 2 group third-placed teams from the Top 16; 2 group fourth-placed teams from the Top 16
Final Four (4 teams)		4 series winners from the playoffs

=== Teams ===
The labels in the parentheses show how each team qualified for the place of its starting round (TH: Euroleague title holders):

- A licence: 3-year licence based on the Euroleague club ranking and other regulations.
- 1st, 2nd, etc.: League position after Playoffs
- EC: Champion of the 2014–15 Eurocup
- WC: Wild card

Regular season
A-license
(Spain) Real MadridTH(1st)	(Greece) Panathinaikos (2nd)	EA7 Emporio Armani Milano (3rd)
(Spain) FC Barcelona Lassa (2nd)	(Turkey) Anadolu Efes (2nd)	(Lithuania) Žalgiris (1st)
(Spain) Laboral Kutxa (6th)	(Turkey) Fenerbahçe Ülker (3rd)	(Russia) CSKA Moscow (1st)
(Greece) Olympiacos (1st)	(Israel) Maccabi FOX Tel Aviv (3rd)	
Associated clubs
(Serbia) Crvena zvezda Telekom (1st)	(Turkey) Pınar Karşıyaka (1st)	(Russia) Khimki (2nd)
(Croatia) Cedevita (2nd)	(Turkey) Darüşşafaka Doğuş (5th)^{(WC)}	(Russia) Lokomotiv Kuban (3rd)^{(WC)}
(France) Limoges (1st)	(Germany) Brose Baskets (1st)	(Italy) Banco di Sardegna Sassari (1st)
(France) Strasbourg (2nd)^{(WC)}	(Germany) Bayern Munich (2nd)^{(WC)}	
(Spain) Unicaja (3rd)	(Poland) Stelmet Zielona Góra (1st)	

Notes

1. ABA League (ABA): Crvena zvezda Telekom and Cedevita qualified through the ABA League.
2. Turkey (TUR): As the Eurocup champion, Khimki, was qualified through a B–licence, an additional B–licence was given to the 2014–15 Turkish League champion, Pınar Karşıyaka.

== Round and draw dates ==
The schedule of the competition is as follows.

Phase	Round	Draw date	Round date
Regular season	Round 1	9 July 2015	15–16 October 2015
Regular season	Round 2	9 July 2015	22–23 October 2015
Regular season	Round 3	9 July 2015	29–30 October 2015
Regular season	Round 4	9 July 2015	5–6 November 2015
Regular season	Round 5	9 July 2015	12–13 November 2015
Regular season	Round 6	9 July 2015	18–20 November 2015
Regular season	Round 7	9 July 2015	26–27 November 2015
Regular season	Round 8	9 July 2015	2–4 December 2015
Regular season	Round 9	9 July 2015	10–11 December 2015
Regular season	Round 10	9 July 2015	17–18 December 2015
Top 16	Round 1	9 July 2015	29–30 December 2015
Top 16	Round 2	9 July 2015	7–8 January 2016
Top 16	Round 3	9 July 2015	14–15 January 2016
Top 16	Round 4	9 July 2015	21–22 January 2016
Top 16	Round 5	9 July 2015	28–29 January 2016
Top 16	Round 6	9 July 2015	4–5 February 2016
Top 16	Round 7	9 July 2015	11–12 February 2016
Top 16	Round 8	9 July 2015	25–26 February 2016
Top 16	Round 9	9 July 2015	2–4 March 2016
Top 16	Round 10	9 July 2015	10–11 March 2016
Top 16	Round 11	9 July 2015	17–18 March 2016
Top 16	Round 12	9 July 2015	23–25 March 2016
Top 16	Round 13	9 July 2015	31 March–1 April 2016
Top 16	Round 14	9 July 2015	7–8 April 2016
Playoffs	Game 1	9 July 2015	12–13 April 2016
Playoffs	Game 2	9 July 2015	14–15 April 2016
Playoffs	Game 3	9 July 2015	18–19 April 2016
Playoffs	Game 4	9 July 2015	21 April 2016
Playoffs	Game 5	9 July 2015	26 April 2016
Final Four	Semifinals	9 July 2015	13 May 2016
Final Four	Final	9 July 2015	15 May 2016

=== Draw ===
The draw was held on 9 July 2015, 13:00 CEST, at the Mediapro Auditorium in Barcelona. The 24 teams were drawn into four groups of six, with the restriction that teams from the same country could not be drawn against each other. For this purpose, Adriatic League worked as only one country. For the draw, the teams were seeded into six pots, in accordance with the Club Ranking, based on their performance in European competitions during a three-year period and the lowest possible position that any club from that league can occupy in the draw is calculated by adding the results of the worst performing team from each league.

Pot 1
Team	Pts
(Russia) CSKA Moscow	178
(Spain) Real Madrid	178
(Spain) FC Barcelona Lassa	171
(Greece) Olympiacos	170

Pot 4
Team	Pts
(Lithuania) Žalgiris	109
(Italy) EA7 Emporio Armani Milan	96
(Serbia) Crvena zvezda Telekom	95
(Germany) Brose Baskets	80

Pot 2
Team	Pts
(Israel) Maccabi FOX Tel Aviv	151
(Greece) Panathinaikos	142
(Turkey) Fenerbahçe	129
(Turkey) Anadolu Efes	126

Pot 5
Team	Pts
(Turkey) Pınar Karşıyaka	69^{†}
(Turkey) Darüşşafaka Doğuş	69^{†}
(Croatia) Cedevita	63
(Germany) Bayern Munich	63

Pot 3
Team	Pts
(Russia) Khimki	125
(Spain) Laboral Kutxa	119
(Russia) Lokomotiv Kuban	118
(Spain) Unicaja	112

Pot 6
Team	Pts
(Italy) Banco di Sardegna Sassari	57
(Poland) Stelmet Zielona Góra	52
(France) Strasbourg	48
(France) Limoges	35^{†}

Notes

^† Indicates teams with points applying the minimum for the league they play.

== Regular season ==
Location of teams of the 2015–16 Euroleague regular season.
Red: Group A; Green: Group B; Blue: Group C; Yellow: Group D.

In each group, teams played against each other home-and-away in a round-robin format. The matchdays were 15–16 October, 22–23 October, 29–30 October, 5–6 November, 12–13 November, 19–20 November, 26–27 November, 3–4 December, 10–11 December and 17–18 December 2015.

The four first qualified teams advanced to the Top 16, while the fifth and the sixth-placed teams entered the Eurocup Last 32.

A total of 12 countries were represented in the group stage. Pınar Karşıyaka and Darüşşafaka Doğuş made their debut appearances in the group stage of the modern era of Euroleague Basketball.

=== Group A ===
Pos	Team	Pld	W	L	PF	PA	PD	Qualification	FNB	KHI	CZT	RMB	BAY	SIG
1	(Turkey) Fenerbahçe	10	8	2	770	707	+63	Advance to Top 16	—	88–83	79–61	77–66	74−67	81–64
2	(Russia) Khimki	10	5	5	798	740	+58	Advance to Top 16	68–70	—	91–53	84−70	70–81	88–62
3	(Serbia) Crvena Zvezda Telekom	10	5	5	766	813	−47	Advance to Top 16	60–74	96–91	—	94–88	85–76	81−59
4	(Spain) Real Madrid	10	5	5	854	808	+46	Advance to Top 16	80–73	82–85	98–71	—	101–99	97–65
5	(Germany) Bayern Munich	10	4	6	763	780	−17	Transfer to Eurocup	67–84	69–60	79–90	67–86	—	76–61
6	(France) Strasbourg	10	3	7	711	814	−103	Transfer to Eurocup	91–70	69–78	78–75	93–86	69–82	—

Source: Euroleague

=== Group B ===
Pos	Team	Pld	W	L	PF	PA	PD	Qualification	OLY	EFS	LBO	CED	LIM	EA7
1	(Greece) Olympiacos	10	8	2	761	692	+69	Advance to Top 16	—	68–81	59–52	76−61	75–49	73–63
2	(Turkey) Anadolu Efes	10	6	4	863	805	+58	Advance to Top 16	87–91	—	95–86	75–81	92–74	89–73
3	(Spain) Laboral Kutxa	10	6	4	854	766	+88	Advance to Top 16	96–89	92–90	—	92–70	92–56	94–82
4	(Croatia) Cedevita	10	4	6	750	780	−30	Advance to Top 16	70–83	75–81	76–67	—	80–84	82–85
5	(France) Limoges	10	3	7	698	823	−125	Transfer to Eurocup	67–76	77–89	71–107	69–78	—	74–65
6	(Italy) EA7 Emporio Armani Milan	10	3	7	737	797	−60	Transfer to Eurocup	66–71	88–84	78–76	68–77	69–77	—

Source: Euroleague

=== Group C ===
Pos	Team	Pld	W	L	PF	PA	PD	Qualification	LOK	FCB	PAO	ZAL	KSK	ZGA
1	(Russia) Lokomotiv Kuban	10	8	2	754	683	+71	Advance to Top 16	—	78–74	81−70	80–50	72–53	51–66
2	(Spain) FC Barcelona Lassa	10	6	4	822	747	+75	Advance to Top 16	72–68	—	77–52	88–92	107–79	78–72
3	(Greece) Panathinaikos	10	6	4	756	710	+46	Advance to Top 16	71–77	93–86	—	91–56	85–73	82–51
4	(Lithuania) Žalgiris	10	5	5	697	731	−34	Advance to Top 16	74–76	78–85	72–75	—	74–52	67–56
5	(Turkey) Pınar Karşıyaka	10	3	7	698	772	−74	Transfer to Eurocup	78–88	71−62	66–69	66–68	—	77–66
6	(Poland) Stelmet Zielona Góra	10	2	8	664	748	−84	Transfer to Eurocup	75–83	64–93	71–68	62−66	81–83	—

Source: Euroleague

=== Group D ===
Pos	Team	Pld	W	L	PF	PA	PD	Qualification	CSK	UNI	BRO	DDI	MTA	DSS
1	(Russia) CSKA Moscow	10	9	1	911	784	+127	Advance to Top 16	—	78–86	83–77	94–66	100−69	93–87
2	(Spain) Unicaja	10	7	3	761	719	+42	Advance to Top 16	76–88	—	76−71	81–69	82–68	80–62
3	(Germany) Brose Baskets	10	6	4	778	720	+58	Advance to Top 16	88–100	73–53	—	86–76	77–66	86–54
4	(Turkey) Darüşşafaka Doğuş	10	4	6	704	740	−36	Advance to Top 16	75–80	63–57	54–65	—	66–70	83−74
5	(Israel) Maccabi Tel Aviv	10	4	6	750	792	−42	Transfer to Eurocup	82–88	82–93	85–65	73–84	—	79–63
6	(Italy) Banco di Sardegna Sassari	10	0	10	690	839	−149	Transfer to Eurocup	78–107	65–77	73–90	60–68	74–76	—

Source: Euroleague

== Top 16 ==
In each group, teams played against each other home-and-away in a round-robin format. The matchdays were 29–30 December, 7–8 January, 14–15 January, 21–22 January, 28–29 January, 4–5 February, 11–12 February, 25–26 February, 3–4 March, 10–11 March, 17–18 March, 24–25 March, 31 March–1 April and 6–7 April 2016.

The four first qualified teams advanced to the Playoffs, while the four last qualified teams were eliminated.

A total of 8 countries were represented in the Top 16. Cedevita and Darüşşafaka Doğuş made their debut appearances in the Top 16 of the modern era of Euroleague Basketball.

=== Group E ===
Pos	Team	Pld	W	L	PF	PA	PD	Qualification	FNB	LOK	PAO	CZT	EFS	DDI	UNI	CED
1	(Turkey) Fenerbahçe	14	11	3	1095	1032	+63	Advance to Playoffs	—	85–79	82–75	72–65	90–86	77–69	80–59	86–73
2	(Russia) Lokomotiv Kuban	14	9	5	1099	978	+121	Advance to Playoffs	52–55	—	76–67	86–62	78–77	82–58	81–60	87–63
3	(Greece) Panathinaikos	14	9	5	1067	1027	+40	Advance to Playoffs	76–71	84–79	—	63–74	83–78	82–79	68–66	76–60
4	(Serbia) Crvena zvezda Telekom	14	7	7	1038	1060	−22	Advance to Playoffs	65–88	80–66	69–67	—	91–82	61–80	87–73	94–74
5	(Turkey) Anadolu Efes	14	7	7	1121	1106	+15		73–77	61–76	91–86	85–84	—	84–71	87–67	80–76
6	(Turkey) Darüşşafaka Doğuş	14	5	9	1060	1083	−23		100–106	87–86	84–86	69–66	68–72	—	78–55	72–79
7	(Spain) Unicaja	14	4	10	971	1076	−105		71–67	64–82	58–76	72–78	75–85	70–62	—	90–67
8	(Croatia) Cedevita	14	4	10	1038	1127	−89		89–59	75–89	60–78	83–62	84–80	77–83	78–91	—

Source: Euroleague

=== Group F ===
Pos	Team	Pld	W	L	PF	PA	PD	Qualification	CSK	LBO	FCB	RMB	KHI	BRO	OLY	ZAL
1	(Russia) CSKA Moscow	14	10	4	1299	1185	+114	Advance to Playoffs	—	90–78	93–82	95–81	108–98	91–70	92–85	100–86
2	(Spain) Laboral Kutxa	14	9	5	1110	1075	+35	Advance to Playoffs	81–71	—	75–71	89–88	98–83	90–64	76–82	71–65
3	(Spain) FC Barcelona Lassa	14	8	6	1085	1059	+26	Advance to Playoffs	100–98	78–81	—	72–65	87–70	75–57	82–66	92–86
4	(Spain) Real Madrid	14	7	7	1173	1165	+8	Advance to Playoffs	87–96	68–77	86–87	—	83–70	82–79	84–72	92–86
5	(Russia) Khimki	14	7	7	1164	1138	+26		91–89	76–68	75–61	82–93	—	78–61	98–66	111–80
6	(Germany) Brose Baskets	14	7	7	1073	1088	−15		91–83	89–69	74–70	86–90	84–79	—	72–71	96–63
7	(Greece) Olympiacos	14	6	8	1083	1105	−22		96–99	82–68	74–62	99–84	89–77	72–77	—	74–59
8	(Lithuania) Žalgiris	14	2	12	1007	1179	−172		59–94	68–89	59–66	75–90	71–76	75–73	75–55	—

Source: Euroleague

== Playoffs ==
In the playoffs, teams playing against each other had to win three games to win the series. Thus, if one team won three games, before all five games had been played, the games that remained were omitted. The team that finished in the highest Top 16 place played the first, the second, and the fifth (if it was necessary) game of the series at home.

Game 1 was played on 12 and 13 April, game 2 was played on 14 and 15 April, game 3 was played on 18 and 19 April, game 4, if necessary, was played on 21 April, and game 5, if necessary, was played on 26 April 2016.

=== Series ===
Team 1	Series	Team 2	Game 1	Game 2	Game 3	Game 4	Game 5
Fenerbahçe (Turkey)	3–0	(Spain) Real Madrid	75–69	100–78	75–63		
Laboral Kutxa (Spain)	3–0	(Greece) Panathinaikos	84–68	82–78	84–75		
CSKA Moscow (Russia)	3–0	(Serbia) Crvena zvezda Telekom	84–74	77–76	78–71		
Lokomotiv Kuban (Russia)	3–2	(Spain) FC Barcelona Lassa	66–61	66–92	70–82	92–80	81–67

== Final Four ==
The four winners of the quarterfinals qualified for the Final Four. The semifinals were played on May 13, while the third place game and championship game were played on May 15, 2016. The event was held at the Mercedes-Benz Arena in Berlin, Germany.

Semifinals
13 May
(Turkey) Fenerbahçe	88
(Spain) Laboral Kutxa	77
13 May
(Russia) CSKA Moscow	88
(Russia) Lokomotiv Kuban	81

Championship game
15 May
(Turkey) Fenerbahçe	96
(Russia) CSKA Moscow	101
Third place game
15 May
(Spain) Laboral Kutxa	75
(Russia) Lokomotiv Kuban	85

== Attendances ==
=== Average home attendances ===
Pos	Team	Total	High	Low	Average	Change
	Final Four games	45,385	12,250	10,658	11,346	−4.4%
1	(Israel) Maccabi FOX Tel Aviv	55,300	11,060	11,060	11,060	0.0%
2	(Lithuania) Žalgiris	131,998	14,790	8,702	11,000	+8.3%
3	(Spain) Laboral Kutxa	153,265	13,964	8,366	10,948	+11.4%
4	(Spain) Real Madrid	140,015	12,018	9,037	10,770	+1.9%
5	(Serbia) Crvena zvezda Telekom	135,705	18,150	4,961	10,439	−27.9%
6	(Greece) Panathinaikos	132,148	16,419	4,515	10,165	−15.7%
7	(Turkey) Fenerbahçe	142,264	12,886	5,960	10,162	−13.5%
8	(Greece) Olympiacos	102,775	11,640	5,006	8,565	−4.8%
9	(Italy) EA7 Emporio Armani Milan	42,151	11,192	7,174	8,430	+2.5%
10	(Russia) CSKA Moscow	102,427	12,473	4,421	7,316	+56.4%
11	(Germany) Brose Baskets	81,157	8,200	5,693	6,763	−0.5%
12	(Spain) Unicaja	77,307	9,120	4,656	6,442	−12.0%
13	(Germany) Bayern Munich	31,568	6,700	5,869	6,314	+4.8%
14	(Spain) FC Barcelona Lassa	85,157	7,142	4,867	6,083	−9.2%
15	(France) Strasbourg	29,136	6,167	5,398	5,827	+52.6%^{1}
16	(Russia) Lokomotiv Kuban	82,228	7,495	2,814	5,482	+46.2%^{1}
17	(Turkey) Anadolu Efes	55,581	8,685	2,531	4,632	−24.2%
18	(Turkey) Darüşşafaka Doğuş	53,204	4,989	3,291	4,434	n/a
19	(France) Limoges	21,623	4,886	3,446	4,325	−7.1%^{4}
20	(Turkey) Pınar Karşıyaka	18,855	5,000	2,500	3,771	+21.6%^{1}
21	(Croatia) Cedevita	45,003	5,281	1,497	3,750	−0.3%
22	(Poland) Stelmet Zielona Góra	17,980	5,002	2,750	3,596	+46.9%^{1}
23	(Italy) Banco di Sardegna Sassari	16,981	4,005	2,988	3,396	−10.2%
24	(Russia) Khimki	33,707	3,800	1,500	2,809	+29.5%^{1}
	League total	1,832,920	18,150	1,497	7,332	−10.4%

Updated to games played on 15 May 2016
Source: gigabasket.org
Notes:
1: 2014–15 season average applied to Eurocup games.

=== Top 10 ===
Pos.	Round	Game	Home team	Visitor	Attendance	Ref
1	Top 16	10	(Serbia) Crvena zvezda	(Greece) Panathinaikos	18,150	Link
2	Playoffs	3	(Serbia) Crvena zvezda	(Russia) CSKA Moscow	18,087	Link
3	Top 16	13	(Serbia) Crvena zvezda	(Turkey) Darüşşafaka Doğuş	18,078	Link
4	Playoffs	3	(Greece) Panathinaikos	(Spain) Laboral Kutxa	16,419	Link
5	Top 16	13	(Greece) Panathinaikos	(Croatia) Cedevita	16,366	Link
6	Regular Season	4	(Serbia) Crvena zvezda	(Turkey) Fenerbahçe	16,203	Link
7	Top 16	8	(Greece) Panathinaikos	(Turkey) Fenerbahçe	16,188	Link
8	Regular Season	4	(Lithuania) Žalgiris	(Spain) FC Barcelona Lassa	14,790	Link
9	Regular Season	1	(Serbia) Crvena zvezda	(France) Strasbourg	14,338	Link
10	Regular Season	8	(Greece) Panathinaikos	(Spain) FC Barcelona Lassa	13,972	Link

== Individual statistics ==
=== Rating ===
Rank	Name	Team	Games	Rating	PIR
1.	(France) Nando de Colo	(Russia) CSKA Moscow	27	656	24.30
2.	(Greece) Ioannis Bourousis	(Spain) Laboral Kutxa	29	612	21.10
3.	(United States) Malcolm Delaney	(Russia) Lokomotiv Kuban	31	612	19.74

=== Points ===
Rank	Name	Team	Games	Points	PPG
1.	(France) Nando de Colo	(Russia) CSKA Moscow	27	525	19.44
2.	(United States) Malcolm Delaney	(Russia) Lokomotiv Kuban	31	504	16.26
3.	(Serbia) Miloš Teodosić	(Russia) CSKA Moscow	29	467	16.10

=== Rebounds ===
Rank	Name	Team	Games	Rebounds	RPG
1.	(Greece) Ioannis Bourousis	(Spain) Laboral Kutxa	29	251	8.66
2.	(Mexico) Gustavo Ayón	(Spain) Real Madrid	27	213	7.89
3.	(Czech Republic) Jan Veselý	(Turkey) Fenerbahçe	23	156	6.78

=== Assists ===
Rank	Name	Team	Games	Assists	APG
1.	(France) Thomas Heurtel	(Turkey) Anadolu Efes	24	190	7.92
2.	(Greece) Nick Calathes	(Greece) Panathinaikos	27	174	6.44
3.	(Spain) Sergio Rodríguez	(Spain) Real Madrid	27	167	6.19

=== Other statistics ===
Category	Name	Team	Games	Avg
Steals per game	(Greece) Nick Calathes	(Greece) Panathinaikos	27	2.00
Blocks per game	(United States) Ekpe Udoh	(Turkey) Fenerbahçe	27	2.26
Turnovers per game	(France) Thomas Heurtel	(Turkey) Anadolu Efes	24	3.33
Fouls drawn per game	(France) Nando de Colo	(Russia) CSKA Moscow	27	6.48
Fouls drawn per game	(United States) Malcolm Delaney	(Russia) Lokomotiv Kuban	31	6.48
Minutes per game	(United States) Malcolm Delaney	(Russia) Lokomotiv Kuban	31	33:16
2FG%	(United States) James Augustine	(Russia) Khimki	23	0.687
3FG%	(United States) Cory Higgins	(Russia) CSKA Moscow	29	0.539
FT%	(Spain) Pau Ribas	(Spain) FC Barcelona Lassa	27	0.939

=== Game highs ===
Category	Name	Team	Stat
Rating	(Greece) Ioannis Bourousis	(Spain) Laboral Kutxa	44
Points	(United States) Malcolm Delaney	(Russia) Lokomotiv Kuban	31
Rebounds	(United States) Tyler Honeycutt	(Russia) Khimki	19
Assists	(Serbia) Stefan Jović	(Serbia) Crvena zvezda	19
Steals	(Mexico) Gustavo Ayón	(Spain) Real Madrid	6
Blocks	(United States) Ekpe Udoh	(Turkey) Fenerbahçe	7
Turnovers	8 times		7
Fouls Drawn	(France) Nando de Colo	(Russia) CSKA Moscow	13

== Awards ==
=== Euroleague MVP ===
- (France) Nando de Colo ( (Russia) CSKA Moscow)

=== Euroleague Final Four MVP ===
- (France) Nando de Colo ( (Russia) CSKA Moscow)

=== All-Euroleague Teams ===
Pos.	First Team		Second Team	
G	(United States) Malcolm Delaney	(Russia) Lokomotiv Kuban	(Italy) Luigi Datome	(Turkey) Fenerbahçe
G	(France) Nando de Colo	(Russia) CSKA Moscow	(United States) Quincy Miller	(Serbia) Crvena zvezda
F	(Serbia) Miloš Teodosić	(Russia) CSKA Moscow	(United States) Ekpe Udoh	(Turkey) Fenerbahçe
F	(Czech Republic) Jan Veselý	(Turkey) Fenerbahçe	(United States) Anthony Randolph	(Russia) Lokomotiv Kuban
C	(Greece) Ioannis Bourousis	(Spain) Laboral Kutxa	(Mexico) Gustavo Ayón	(Spain) Real Madrid

=== Top Scorer (Alphonso Ford Trophy) ===
- (France) Nando de Colo ( (Russia) CSKA Moscow)

=== Best Defender ===
- (United States) Kyle Hines ( (Russia) CSKA Moscow)

=== Rising Star ===
- (Spain) Álex Abrines ( (Spain) FC Barcelona Lassa)

=== Coach of the Year ===
- (Greece) Dimitrios Itoudis ( (Russia) CSKA Moscow)

=== MVP of the Week ===
==== Regular season ====
Game	Player	Team	PIR
1	(United States) Patric Young	(Greece) Olympiacos	26
2	(Greece) Ioannis Bourousis	(Spain) Laboral Kutxa	44
3	(United States) Darius Adams	(Spain) Laboral Kutxa	29
4	(Spain) Felipe Reyes	(Spain) Real Madrid	30
5	(Italy) Nicolò Melli	(Germany) Brose Baskets	37
6	(United States) Luke Harangody	(Turkey) Darüşşafaka Doğuş	35
7	(United States) Jamel McLean	(Italy) EA7 Milano	36
8	(France) Nando de Colo	(Russia) CSKA Moscow	33
8	(Germany) Maik Zirbes	(Serbia) Crvena zvezda	33
9	(Mexico) Gustavo Ayón	(Spain) Real Madrid	41
10	(France) Nobel Boungou Colo	(France) Limoges	34

==== Top 16 ====
Game	Player	Team	PIR
1	(United States) Malcolm Delaney	(Russia) Lokomotiv Kuban	41
2	(United States) Malcolm Delaney (2)	(Russia) Lokomotiv Kuban	30
3	(Spain) Felipe Reyes (2)	(Spain) Real Madrid	32
4	(Greece) Ioannis Bourousis (2)	(Spain) Laboral Kutxa	30
4	(Czech Republic) Jan Veselý	(Turkey) Fenerbahçe	30
5	(Montenegro) Tyrese Rice	(Russia) Khimki	35
6	(Greece) Georgios Printezis	(Greece) Olympiacos	37
7	(Mexico) Gustavo Ayón (2)	(Spain) Real Madrid	41
8	(United States) Anthony Randolph	(Russia) Lokomotiv Kuban	43
9	(Italy) Luigi Datome	(Turkey) Fenerbahçe	29
10	(Greece) Ioannis Bourousis (3)	(Spain) Laboral Kutxa	29
11	(United States) Bradley Wanamaker	(Germany) Brose Baskets	34
12	(United States) Tyler Honeycutt	(Russia) Khimki	30
13	(Greece) Ioannis Bourousis (4)	(Spain) Laboral Kutxa	35
13	(France) Nando de Colo (2)	(Russia) CSKA Moscow	35
14	(France) Nando de Colo (3)	(Russia) CSKA Moscow	36

==== Playoffs ====
Game	Player	Team	PIR
1	(Serbia) Miloš Teodosić	(Russia) CSKA Moscow	28
2	(United States) Kyle Hines	(Russia) CSKA Moscow	25
2	(United States) Ekpe Udoh	(Turkey) Fenerbahçe	25
3	(United States) Ekpe Udoh (2)	(Turkey) Fenerbahçe	33
4	(United States) Anthony Randolph (2)	(Russia) Lokomotiv Kuban	28
5	(United States) Chris Singleton	(Russia) Lokomotiv Kuban	27

=== MVP of the Month ===
Month	Player	Team	Ref.
October 2015	(United States) Malcolm Delaney	(Russia) Lokomotiv Kuban	
November 2015	(Italy) Nicolò Melli	(Germany) Brose Baskets	
December 2015	(Mexico) Gustavo Ayón	(Spain) Real Madrid	
January 2016	(Czech Republic) Jan Veselý	(Turkey) Fenerbahçe	
February 2016	(France) Nando de Colo	(Russia) CSKA Moscow	
March 2016	(Greece) Ioannis Bourousis	(Spain) Laboral Kutxa	
April 2016	(United States) Ekpe Udoh	(Turkey) Fenerbahçe	

== See also ==
- 2015–16 Eurocup Basketball
- 2015–16 FIBA Europe Cup
