= 2015–16 Euroleague Top 16 =

The 2015–16 Euroleague Top 16 was played from 29 December 2015 to 7 April 2016. A total of 16 teams competed in the Top 16 to decide the 8 places in the Playoffs.

== Format ==
In each group, teams played against each other home-and-away in a round-robin format. The matchdays were 29–30 December, 7–8 January, 14–15 January, 21–22 January, 28–29 January, 4–5 February, 11–12 February, 25–26 February, 3–4 March, 10–11 March, 17–18 March, 24–25 March, 31 March–1 April and 6–7 April 2016.

The four first qualified teams advanced to the Playoffs, while the four last qualified teams were eliminated.

A total of 8 countries were represented in the Top 16. Cedevita and Darüşşafaka Doğuş made their debut appearances in the Top 16 of the modern era of Euroleague Basketball.

=== Tiebreakers ===
If teams are level on record at the end of the Top 16, tiebreakers are applied in the following order:

1. Head-to-head record.
2. Head-to-head point differential.
3. Point differential during the Top 16.
4. Points scored during the Top 16.
5. Sum of quotients of points scored and points allowed in each Top 16 match.

== Groups ==
=== Group E ===
Pos	Team	Pld	W	L	PF	PA	PD	Qualification
1	(Turkey) Fenerbahçe	14	11	3	1095	1032	+63	Advance to Playoffs
2	(Russia) Lokomotiv Kuban	14	9	5	1099	978	+121	Advance to Playoffs
3	(Greece) Panathinaikos	14	9	5	1067	1027	+40	Advance to Playoffs
4	(Serbia) Crvena zvezda Telekom	14	7	7	1038	1060	−22	Advance to Playoffs
5	(Turkey) Anadolu Efes	14	7	7	1121	1106	+15	
6	(Turkey) Darüşşafaka Doğuş	14	5	9	1060	1083	−23	
7	(Spain) Unicaja	14	4	10	971	1076	−105	
8	(Croatia) Cedevita	14	4	10	1038	1127	−89	

Source: Euroleague

29 December 2015	Unicaja (Spain)	70–62	(Turkey) Darüşşafaka Doğuş	Málaga, Spain
20:45 (CET)	Scoring by quarter: 14–16, 15–16, 25–21, 16–9
	Pts: Jackson 20; Rebs: Hendrix 8 Asts: Smith 4 PIR: Hendrix 20	Boxscore	Pts: Erden 15; Rebs: Erden 11; Asts: Preldžić 3 PIR: Erden 23	Arena: Martín Carpena; Attendance: 7,438; Referees: Carmelo Paternico (ITA), Elias Koromilas (GRE), Aare Halliko (EST)

30 December 2015	Anadolu Efes (Turkey)	85–84	(Serbia) Crvena zvezda Telekom	Istanbul, Turkey
18:00 (CET)	Scoring by quarter: 25–23, 19–31, 17–18, 24–12
	Pts: Dunston 21; Rebs: three players 4 Asts: Heurtel 8 PIR: Diebler, Dunston 23	Boxscore	Pts: Zirbes 22; Rebs: Zirbes 12; Asts: Jović 11; PIR: Zirbes 25	Arena: Abdi İpekçi Arena; Attendance: 2,626; Referees: Miguel Ángel Pérez Pérez (ESP), Joseph Bissang (FRA), Marcin Kowalski (POL)

30 December 2015	Cedevita (Croatia)	75–89	(Russia) Lokomotiv Kuban	Zagreb, Croatia
19:00 (CET)	Scoring by quarter: 21–16, 20–34, 15–13, 19–26
	Pts: White 14; Rebs: White 7 Asts: Pullen 6 PIR: White 18	Boxscore	Pts: Delaney 31; Rebs: Claver 8 Asts: Delaney 8 PIR: Delaney 41	Arena: Dražen Petrović Zagreb; Attendance: 4,067; Referees: Daniel Hierrezuelo (ESP), Fernando Rocha (POR), Tolga Sahin (ITA)

30 December 2015	Fenerbahçe (Turkey)	82–75	(Greece) Panathinaikos	Istanbul, Turkey
20:00 (CET)	Scoring by quarter: 28–18, 18–25, 16–15, 20–17
	Pts: Udoh 16; Rebs: Udoh 7 Asts: Dixon 5 PIR: Udoh 23	Boxscore	Pts: Gist, Raduljica 14; Rebs: Fotsis, Raduljica 6 Asts: Diamantidis 5 PIR: Raduljica 19	Arena: Ülker Sports Arena; Attendance: 9,172; Referees: Emilio Pérez Pizarro (ESP), Oļegs Latiševs (LAT), Sašo Petek (SLO)

7 January 2016	Darüşşafaka Doğuş (Turkey)	72–79	(Croatia) Cedevita	Istanbul, Turkey
20:00 (CET)	Scoring by quarter: 26–19, 13–21, 19–18, 14–21
	Pts: Erden 13; Rebs: Erden, Preldžić 6 Asts: Gordon 5 PIR: Erden 25	Boxscore	Pts: Pullen 25; Rebs: Bilan 9 Asts: Pullen 5 PIR: Pullen 19	Arena: Volkswagen Arena; Attendance: 4,319; Referees: Christos Christodoulou (GRE), Juan Carlos García González (ESP), Piotr Pastusiak (POL)

8 January 2016	Lokomotiv Kuban (Russia)	78–77	(Turkey) Anadolu Efes	Krasnodar, Russia
18:00 (CET)	Scoring by quarter: 13–21, 24–22, 16–16, 25–18
	Pts: Delaney 25; Rebs: Randolph 9 Asts: Delaney 5 PIR: Delaney 30	Boxscore	Pts: Heurtel 16; Rebs: Brown 11; Asts: Heurtel 6 PIR: Brown 25	Arena: Basket Hall; Attendance: 4,788; Referees: Luigi Lamonica (ITA), Benjamín Jiménez (ESP), Miloš Koljenšić (MNE)

8 January 2016	Crvena zvezda Telekom (Serbia)	65–88	(Turkey) Fenerbahçe	Belgrade, Serbia
20:00 (CET)	Scoring by quarter: 20–23, 8–18, 18–22, 19–25
	Pts: Miller 21; Rebs: Zirbes 6 Asts: Kinsey 5 PIR: Miller 27	Boxscore	Pts: Datome 21; Rebs: Veselý 15; Asts: Dixon 11; PIR: Veselý 25	Arena: Pionir; Attendance: 6,421; Referees: Daniel Hierrezuelo (ESP), Petri Mäntylä (FIN), Ioannis Foufis (GRE)

8 January 2016	Panathinaikos (Greece)	68–66	(Spain) Unicaja	Athens, Greece
20:45 (CET)	Scoring by quarter: 21–17, 16–16, 21–22, 10–11
	Pts: Diamantidis 17; Rebs: Gist, Kuzmić 7 Asts: Diamantidis 7 PIR: Diamantidis 27	Boxscore	Pts: Smith 22; Rebs: Díez 10; Asts: Díaz, Nelson 3 PIR: Díez 17	Arena: Olympic Sports Center Athens; Attendance: 8,685; Referees: Damir Javor (SLO), Robert Lottermoser (GER), Jakub Zamojski (POL)

14 January 2016	Fenerbahçe (Turkey)	85–79	(Russia) Lokomotiv Kuban	Istanbul, Turkey
20:00 (CET)	Scoring by quarter: 20–18, 17–27, 14–15, 34–19
	Pts: Bogdanović 18; Rebs: Veselý 7 Asts: Bogdanović 5 PIR: Veselý 23	Boxscore	Pts: Claver 21; Rebs: Singleton 9 Asts: Delaney 7 PIR: Claver 24	Arena: Ülker Sports Arena; Attendance: 10,397; Referees: Juan Carlos García González (ESP), Spiros Gkontas (GRE), Tomislav Hordov (CRO)

14 January 2016	Panathinaikos (Greece)	63–74	(Serbia) Crvena zvezda Telekom	Athens, Greece
20:15 (CET)	Scoring by quarter: 14–16, 20–22, 14–16, 15–20
	Pts: Gist 15; Rebs: Fotsis, Kuzmić 6 Asts: Diamantidis 4 PIR: Raduljica 16	Boxscore	Pts: Zirbes 12; Rebs: Jović 8 Asts: Jović 8 PIR: Jović, Kinsey 15	Arena: Olympic Sports Center Athens; Attendance: 7,061; Referees: Borys Ryzhyk (UKR), Antonio Conde (ESP), Amit Balak (ISR)

14 January 2016	Unicaja (Spain)	90–67	(Croatia) Cedevita	Málaga, Spain
20:45 (CET)	Scoring by quarter: 27–14, 25–17, 19–19, 19–17
	Pts: Kuzminskas 17; Rebs: Thomas 6 Asts: Suárez 4 PIR: Kuzminskas 19	Boxscore	Pts: Babić 24; Rebs: Bilan 6 Asts: Bilan 4 PIR: Babić 19	Arena: Martín Carpena; Attendance: 5,972; Referees: Eddie Viator (FRA), Oļegs Latiševs (LAT), Ioannis Foufis (GRE)

15 January 2016	Anadolu Efes (Turkey)	84–71	(Turkey) Darüşşafaka Doğuş	Istanbul, Turkey
19:00 (CET)	Scoring by quarter: 14–15, 22–12, 25–24, 23–20
	Pts: Granger 15; Rebs: Tyus 9 Asts: Heurtel 10; PIR: Granger 27	Boxscore	Pts: Wilbekin 20; Rebs: Erden 7 Asts: Wilbekin 4 PIR: Wilbekin 18	Arena: Abdi İpekçi Arena; Attendance: 4,387; Referees: Sreten Radović (SRB), Vicente Bultó (ESP), Petros Papaetrou (GRE)

21 January 2016	Lokomotiv Kuban (Russia)	76–67	(Greece) Panathinaikos	Krasnodar, Russia
18:00 (CET)	Scoring by quarter: 22–22, 16–17, 15–12, 23–16
	Pts: Draper 20; Rebs: Delaney 5 Asts: Delaney 6 PIR: Delaney 22	Boxscore	Pts: Feldeine 13; Rebs: Raduljica 6 Asts: Calathes 8 PIR: Janković 15	Arena: Basket Hall; Attendance: 5,112; Referees: Ilija Belošević (SRB), Carmelo Paternico (ITA), Petri Mäntylä (FIN)

21 January 2016	Cedevita (Croatia)	84–80	(Turkey) Anadolu Efes	Zagreb, Croatia
19:00 (CET)	Scoring by quarter: 24–20, 23–27, 18–12, 19–21
	Pts: Arapović, Bilan 16; Rebs: Babić 10; Asts: Babić, Žganec 3 PIR: Arapović 22	Boxscore	Pts: Brown 17; Rebs: Brown 7 Asts: Heurtel 10; PIR: Brown 27	Arena: Dražen Petrović Zagreb; Attendance: 3,661; Referees: Robert Lottermoser (GER), Emilio Pérez Pérez, Spiros Gkontas (GRE)

22 January 2016	Darüşşafaka Doğuş (Turkey)	100–106	(Turkey) Fenerbahçe	Istanbul, Turkey
19:00 (CET)	Scoring by quarter: 24–37, 27–25, 22–24, 27–20
	Pts: Harangody 22; Rebs: Harangody 6 Asts: Redding 4 PIR: Harangody 24	Boxscore	Pts: Dixon 24; Rebs: Veselý 13; Asts: Bogdanović 5 PIR: Veselý 30	Arena: Volkswagen Arena; Attendance: 4,895; Referees: Saša Pukl (SLO), Benjamín Jiménez (ESP), Seffi Shemmesh (ISR)

22 January 2016	Crvena zvezda Telekom (Serbia)	87–73	(Spain) Unicaja	Belgrade, Serbia
20:00 (CET)	Scoring by quarter: 21–14, 20–17, 19–22, 27–20
	Pts: Jović 15; Rebs: Zirbes 6 Asts: Jović, Micić 5 PIR: Jović 24	Boxscore	Pts: Smith 11; Rebs: Hendrix 6 Asts: Hendrix, Smith 3 PIR: Cooley 14	Arena: Pionir; Attendance: 6,421; Referees: Luigi Lamonica (ITA), Matej Boltauzer (SLO), Piotr Pastusiak (POL)

28 January 2016	Fenerbahçe (Turkey)	86–73	(Croatia) Cedevita	Istanbul, Turkey
19:30 (CET)	Scoring by quarter: 27–12, 13–21, 22–28, 24–12
	Pts: Datome 19; Rebs: Veselý 6 Asts: Hickman 6 PIR: Datome 22	Boxscore	Pts: White, Bilan 13; Rebs: Arapović 8 Asts: White 4 PIR: White 16	Arena: Ülker Sports Arena; Attendance: 11,133; Referees: Borys Ryzhyk (UKR), Vicente Bultó (ESP), Marcin Kowalski (POL)

29 January 2016	Unicaja (Spain)	75–85	(Turkey) Anadolu Efes	Málaga, Spain
20:00 (CET)	Scoring by quarter: 23–21, 24–25, 19–20, 9–19
	Pts: Hendrix, Kuzminskas 16; Rebs: Hendrix 8 Asts: Hendrix 4 PIR: Hendrix 18	Boxscore	Pts: Granger 22; Rebs: Brown, Dunston 5 Asts: Heurtel 5 PIR: Granger 19	Arena: Martín Carpena; Attendance: 6,431; Referees: Fernando Rocha (POR), Saša Pukl (SLO), Boris Shulga (UKR)

29 January 2016	Crvena zvezda Telekom (Serbia)	80–66	(Russia) Lokomotiv Kuban	Belgrade, Serbia
20:00 (CET)	Scoring by quarter: 33–21, 17–16, 17–17, 13–12
	Pts: Miller 24; Rebs: Zirbes 9 Asts: Jović 6 PIR: Miller 25	Boxscore	Pts: Randolph 22; Rebs: Claver 10; Asts: Randolph 4 PIR: Claver 24	Arena: Pionir; Attendance: 6,479; Referees: Miguel Ángel Pérez Pérez (ESP), Tolga Sahin (ITA), Aare Halliko (EST)

29 January 2016	Panathinaikos (Greece)	82–79	(Turkey) Darüşşafaka Doğuş	Athens, Greece
20:45 (CET)	Scoring by quarter: 16–21, 26–17, 21–20, 19–21
	Pts: Raduljica 17; Rebs: Raduljica 8 Asts: Calathes 9 PIR: Calathes 22	Boxscore	Pts: Gordon 26; Rebs: Gordon, Harangody 5 Asts: Preldžić 5 PIR: Gordon, Harangody 26	Arena: Olympic Sports Center Athens; Attendance: 5,250; Referees: Luigi Lamonica (ITA), Carlos Peruga (ESP), Miloš Koljenšić (MNE)

4 February 2016	Cedevita (Croatia)	60–78	(Greece) Panathinaikos	Zagreb, Croatia
19:00 (CET)	Scoring by quarter: 13–18, 9–21, 14–21, 24–18
	Pts: Pilepić 16; Rebs: Walker 5 Asts: Gordić 4 PIR: Pilepić 16	Boxscore	Pts: Raduljica 21; Rebs: Fotsis, Gist 7 Asts: Calathes 10; PIR: Raduljica 26	Arena: Dražen Petrović Zagreb; Attendance: 5,200; Referees: Fernando Rocha (POR), Miguel Ángel Pérez Pérez (ESP), Renaud Geller (BEL)

4 February 2016	Darüşşafaka Doğuş (Turkey)	69–66	(Serbia) Crvena zvezda Telekom	Istanbul, Turkey
19:30 (CET)	Scoring by quarter: 21–19, 20–18, 14–17, 14–12
	Pts: Erden 14; Rebs: Gordon 7 Asts: Gordon, Redding 3 PIR: Erden 19	Boxscore	Pts: Kinsey 16; Rebs: Štimac 10; Asts: Jović 6 PIR: Štimac 13	Arena: Volkswagen Arena; Attendance: 4,678; Referees: Damir Javor (SLO), Boris Shulga (UKR), Ioannis Foufis (GRE)

4 February 2016	Unicaja (Spain)	64–82	(Russia) Lokomotiv Kuban	Málaga, Spain
20:45 (CET)	Scoring by quarter: 16–16, 16–18, 15–26, 17–22
	Pts: Kuzminskas 16; Rebs: Díez 6 Asts: Díaz 3 PIR: Kuzminskas 19	Boxscore	Pts: Delaney 21; Rebs: Randolph 6 Asts: Delaney 7 PIR: Delaney 31	Arena: Martín Carpena; Attendance: 5,412; Referees: Borys Rhyzhyk (UKR), Elias Koromilas (GRE), Sašo Petek (SLO)

5 February 2016	Anadolu Efes (Turkey)	73–77	(Turkey) Fenerbahçe	Istanbul, Turkey
19:30 (CET)	Scoring by quarter: 21–19, 20–17, 16–20, 16–22
	Pts: Osman, Šarić 15; Rebs: Dunston 6 Asts: Granger 7 PIR: Osman 17	Boxscore	Pts: Bogdanović, Udoh 15; Rebs: Veselý 7 Asts: Dixon 4 PIR: Udoh 20	Arena: Abdi İpekçi Arena; Attendance: 8,685; Referees: Christos Christodoulou (GRE), Daniel Hierrezuelo (ESP), Piotr Pastusiak (POL)

11 February 2016	Fenerbahçe (Turkey)	80–59	(Spain) Unicaja	Istanbul, Turkey
20:00 (CET)	Scoring by quarter: 16–15, 25–13, 20–17, 19–14
	Pts: Datome 13; Rebs: Udoh 10; Asts: Dixon 5 PIR: Udoh 29	Boxscore	Pts: Nelson 11; Rebs: Thomas 7 Asts: Nedović, Nelson 3 PIR: Nelson 14	Arena: Ülker Sports Arena; Attendance: 11,439; Referees: Robert Lottermoser (GER), Milija Vojinović (SRB), Damir Javor (SLO)

11 February 2016	Crvena zvezda Telekom (Serbia)	94–74	(Croatia) Cedevita	Belgrade, Serbia
20:00 (CET)	Scoring by quarter: 26–12, 17–20, 19–24, 32–18
	Pts: Miller 22; Rebs: Štimac 13; Asts: Micić 9 PIR: Miller 27	Boxscore	Pts: Pullen 20; Rebs: Walker, White 7 Asts: Bilan 5 PIR: White 24	Arena: Pionir; Attendance: 6,491; Referees: Christos Christodoulou (GRE), Eddie Viator (FRA), Carlos Peruga (ESP)

12 February 2016	Lokomotiv Kuban (Russia)	82–58	(Turkey) Darüşşafaka Doğuş	Krasnodar, Russia
17:00 (CET)	Scoring by quarter: 19–16, 25–12, 16–12, 22–18
	Pts: Randolph 18; Rebs: Claver, Singleton 8 Asts: Delaney 4 PIR: Singleton 18	Boxscore	Pts: Wilbekin 19; Rebs: Preldžić, Slaguhter 7 Asts: Preldžić 5 PIR: Wilbekin 19	Arena: Basket Hall; Attendance: 4,254; Referees: Milivoje Jovčić (SRB), Juan Carlos García González (ESP), David Romano (ISR)

12 February 2016	Panathinaikos (Greece)	83–78	(Turkey) Anadolu Efes	Athens, Greece
20:45 (CET)	Scoring by quarter: 17–20, 19–15, 28–24, 19–19
	Pts: Raduljica 23; Rebs: Gist, Raduljica 8 Asts: Calathes 6 PIR: Raduljica 28	Boxscore	Pts: Šarić 18; Rebs: Brown 7 Asts: Heurtel 7 PIR: Šarić 22	Arena: Olympic Sports Center Athens; Attendance: 10,048; Referees: Matej Boltauzer (SLO), Sreten Radović (SRB), Bejamín Jiménez (ESP)

25 February 2016	Darüşşafaka Doğuş (Turkey)	78–55	(Spain) Unicaja	Istanbul, Turkey
18:30 (CET)	Scoring by quarter: 19–16, 18–12, 22–17, 19–10
	Pts: Harangody 21; Rebs: Harangody 8 Asts: Redding 6 PIR: Harangody 26	Boxscore	Pts: Kuzminskas, Vázquez 12; Rebs: Kuzminskas 6 Asts: Nelson 4 PIR: Kuzminskas 13	Arena: Volkswagen Arena; Attendance: 4,783; Referees: Ilija Belošević (SRB), Matej Boltauzer (SLO), Marcin Kowalski (POL)

25 February 2016	Lokomotiv Kuban (Russia)	87–63	(Croatia) Cedevita	Krasnodar, Russia
19:00 (CET)	Scoring by quarter: 29–12, 15–21, 26–13, 17–17
	Pts: Randolph 28; Rebs: Randolph 13; Asts: Delaney 10; PIR: Randolph 43	Boxscore	Pts: Bilan 11; Rebs: Bilan 6 Asts: Babić, Gordić 3 PIR: Bilan 11	Arena: Basket Hall; Attendance: 2,814; Referees: Daniel Hierrezuelo (ESP), Piotr Pastusiak (POL), Seffi Shemmesh (ISR)

25 February 2016	Panathinaikos (Greece)	76–71	(Turkey) Fenerbahçe	Athens, Greece
20:15 (CET)	Scoring by quarter: 15–20, 21–16, 19–17, 21–18
	Pts: Williams 14; Rebs: Kuzmić 8 Asts: Diamantidis 7 PIR: Raduljica 13	Boxscore	Pts: Udoh 19; Rebs: Udoh, Veselý 7 Asts: Bogdanović, Datome 3 PIR: Udoh 24	Arena: Olympic Sports Center Athens; Attendance: 16,188; Referees: Juan Carlos García González (ESP), Carmelo Paternico (ITA), Sašo Petek (SLO)

26 February 2016	Crvena zvezda Telekom (Serbia)	91–82	(Turkey) Anadolu Efes	Vršac, Serbia
20:00 (CET)	Scoring by quarter: 24–19, 14–27, 25–19, 28–17
	Pts: Miller 15; Rebs: Zirbes 9 Asts: Gudurić 5 PIR: Zirbes 23	Boxscore	Pts: Šarić 19; Rebs: Šarić 8 Asts: Heurtel 11; PIR: Šarić 27	Arena: Millennium Center; Attendance: 4,961; Referees: Emilio Pérez Pizarro (ESP), Elias Koromilas (GRE), Tomas Jasevičius (LTU)

3 March 2016	Cedevita (Croatia)	77–83	(Turkey) Darüşşafaka Doğuş	Zagreb, Croatia
19:00 (CET)	Scoring by quarter: 19–24, 19–19, 23–16, 16–24
	Pts: Pullen 26; Rebs: Arapović 9 Asts: White 4 PIR: Pullen 33	Boxscore	Pts: Slaughter 17; Rebs: Slaughter 5 Asts: Wilbekin 6 PIR: Slaughter 22	Arena: Dražen Petrović Zagreb; Attendance: 2,147; Referees: Borys Ryzhyk (UKR), Elias Koromilas (GRE), Clemens Fritz (GER)

3 March 2016	Unicaja (Spain)	58–76	(Greece) Panathinaikos	Málaga, Spain
20:45 (CET)	Scoring by quarter: 7–26, 20–16, 19–22, 12–12
	Pts: Kuzminskas 15; Rebs: Cooley 5 Asts: Jackson 4 PIR: Kuzminskas, Suárez 15	Boxscore	Pts: Williams 16; Rebs: Calathes, Kuzmić 5 Asts: Calathes 10; PIR: Calathes 20	Arena: Martín Carpena; Attendance: 5,469; Referees: Luigi Lamonica (ITA), Piotr Pastusiak (POL), Jurgis Laurinavičius (LTU)

3 March 2016	Anadolu Efes (Turkey)	61–76	(Russia) Lokomotiv Kuban	Istanbul, Turkey
20:45 (CET)	Scoring by quarter: 16–17, 12–21, 16–15, 17–23
	Pts: Heurtel 17; Rebs: Heurtel, Osman 7 Asts: Granger, Heurtel 3 PIR: Heurtel 20	Boxscore	Pts: Delaney 19; Rebs: Claver 9 Asts: Delaney 6 PIR: Delaney 27	Arena: Abdi İpekçi Arena; Attendance: 4,139; Referees: Damir Javor (SLO), Antonio Conde (ESP), Petri Mäntylä (FIN)

4 March 2016	Fenerbahçe (Turkey)	72–65	(Serbia) Crvena zvezda Telekom	Istanbul, Turkey
19:30 (CET)	Scoring by quarter: 14–18, 11–16, 24–6, 23–25
	Pts: Datome 27; Rebs: Bogdanović 7 Asts: Dixon 6 PIR: Datome 29	Boxscore	Pts: Zirbes 11; Rebs: Zirbes 7 Asts: Micić 4 PIR: Simonović 14	Arena: Ülker Sports Arena; Attendance: 10,694; Referees: Miguel Ángel Pérez Pérez (ESP), Spiros Gkontas (GRE), Marcin Kowalski (POL)

10 March 2016	Lokomotiv Kuban (Russia)	52–55	(Turkey) Fenerbahçe	Krasnodar, Russia
18:00 (CET)	Scoring by quarter: 13–17, 12–13, 19–13, 8–12
	Pts: Claver, Delaney 12; Rebs: Claver 12; Asts: Delaney 5 PIR: Claver 18	Boxscore	Pts: Bogdanović 17; Rebs: Datome 8 Asts: Dixon 4 PIR: Bogdanović 20	Arena: Basket Hall; Attendance: 6,979; Referees: Luigi Lamonica (ITA), Matej Boltauzer (SLO), Emilio Pérez Pizarro (ESP)

10 March 2016	Cedevita (Croatia)	78–91	(Spain) Unicaja	Zagreb, Croatia
19:00 (CET)	Scoring by quarter: 23–25, 19–23, 12–17, 24–26
	Pts: White 16; Rebs: Bilan 9 Asts: Babić 5 PIR: White 20	Boxscore	Pts: Cooley 16; Rebs: Cooley 10; Asts: Jackson, Nedović 5 PIR: Cooley 25	Arena: Dražen Petrović Zagreb; Attendance: 3,777; Referees: Carmelo Paternico (ITA), Spiros Gkontas (GRE), Aare Halliko (EST)

11 March 2016	Darüşşafaka Doğuş (Turkey)	68–72	(Turkey) Anadolu Efes	Istanbul, Turkey
19:30 (CET)	Scoring by quarter: 15–13, 11–21, 24–21, 18–17
	Pts: Wilbekin 17; Rebs: Harangody 8 Asts: Aldemir, Redding 3 PIR: Wilbekin 17	Boxscore	Pts: Heurtel 21; Rebs: Dunston 8 Asts: Heurtel 3 PIR: Heurtel 24	Arena: Volkswagen Arena; Attendance: 4,989; Referees: Christos Christodoulou (GRE), Eddie Viator (FRA), Miloš Koljenšić (MNE)

11 March 2016	Crvena zvezda Telekom (Serbia)	69–67	(Greece) Panathinaikos	Belgrade, Serbia
20:00 (CET)	Scoring by quarter: 10–18, 18–13, 25–11, 16–25
	Pts: Kinsey 19; Rebs: three players 5 Asts: Jović 6 PIR: Miller 27	Boxscore	Pts: Williams 17; Rebs: Raduljica 7 Asts: Diamantidis 3 PIR: Raduljica, Williams 16	Arena: Kombank Arena; Attendance: 18,150; Referees: Borys Ryzhyk (UKR), Robert Lottermoser (GER), Antonio Conde (ESP)

17 March 2016	Fenerbahçe (Turkey)	77–69	(Turkey) Darüşşafaka Doğuş	Istanbul, Turkey
19:00 (CET)	Scoring by quarter: 25–21, 20–18, 12–15, 20–15
	Pts: Udoh 18; Rebs: Udoh, Veselý 6 Asts: Bogdanović 4 PIR: Datome, Udoh 21	Boxscore	Pts: Redding 12; Rebs: Harangody 6 Asts: Harangody 3 PIR: Harangody 12	Arena: Ülker Sports Arena; Attendance: 5,980; Referees: Sreten Radović (CRO), Daniel Hierrezuelo (ESP), Seffi Shemmesh (ISR)

17 March 2016	Panathinaikos (Greece)	84–79	(Russia) Lokomotiv Kuban	Athens, Greece
20:15 (CET)	Scoring by quarter: 19–19, 17–22, 24–22, 24–16
	Pts: Gist, Williams 16; Rebs: Gist 6 Asts: Calathes 9 PIR: Gist 22	Boxscore	Pts: Janning 16; Rebs: Randolph 10; Asts: Delaney 4 PIR: Claver 23	Arena: Olympic Sports Center Athens; Attendance: 13,045; Referees: Fernando Rocha (POR), Saša Pukl (SLO), Benjamín Jiménez (ESP)

18 March 2016	Anadolu Efes (Turkey)	80–76	(Croatia) Cedevita	Istanbul, Turkey
19:30 (CET)	Scoring by quarter: 20–28, 14–8, 19–18, 27–22
	Pts: Heurtel 19; Rebs: Dunston 7 Asts: Heurtel 8 PIR: Heurtel 26	Boxscore	Pts: Arapović, Gordić 16; Rebs: Babić 5 Asts: White 4 PIR: Bilan 19	Arena: Abdi İpekçi Arena; Attendance: 3,579; Referees: Juan Carlos García González (ESP), Marcin Kowalski (POL), Amit Balak (ISR)

18 March 2016	Unicaja (Spain)	72–78	(Serbia) Crvena zvezda Telekom	Málaga, Spain
20:45 (CET)	Scoring by quarter: 20–12, 23–15, 17–26, 12–25
	Pts: Nedović 22; Rebs: three players 6 Asts: Jackson 4 PIR: three players 16	Boxscore	Pts: Jović 16; Rebs: Miller, Zirbes 7 Asts: Micić 8 PIR: Jović 24	Arena: Martín Carpena; Attendance: 5,856; Referees: Oļegs Latiševs (LAT), Tolga Sahin (ITA), Ersan Kartal (TUR)

24 March 2016	Lokomotiv Kuban (Russia)	86–62	(Serbia) Crvena zvezda Telekom	Krasnodar, Russia
18:00 (CET)	Scoring by quarter: 19–15, 26–20, 21–14, 20–13
	Pts: Randolph, Singleton 17; Rebs: Delaney 4 Asts: Delaney 9 PIR: Delaney 25	Boxscore	Pts: Gudurić 13; Rebs: Zirbes 8 Asts: Gudurić 4 PIR: Štimac 17	Arena: Basket Hall; Attendance: 6,442; Referees: Juan Carlos García González (ESP), Carmelo Paternico (ITA), Aare Halliko (EST)

24 March 2016	Darüşşafaka Doğuş (Turkey)	84–86	(Greece) Panathinaikos	Istanbul, Turkey
19:30 (CET)	Scoring by quarter: 30–22, 12–18, 21–25, 21–21
	Pts: Erden 21; Rebs: Bjelica 6 Asts: Yağmur 4 PIR: Erden 19	Boxscore	Pts: Raduljica 21; Rebs: Raduljica 6 Asts: Diamantidis 5 PIR: Raduljica 21	Arena: Volkswagen Arena; Attendance: 4,358; Referees: Damir Javor (SLO), Vicente Bultó (ESP), Tomas Jasevičius (LTU)

25 March 2016	Cedevita (Croatia)	89–59	(Turkey) Fenerbahçe	Zagreb, Croatia
19:00 (CET)	Scoring by quarter: 22–13, 22–17, 27–13, 18–16
	Pts: Arapović 18; Rebs: Žganec 9 Asts: White 5 PIR: White 22	Boxscore	Pts: Udoh 11; Rebs: Antić 6 Asts: Hickman 3 PIR: Hickman, Kalinić 10	Arena: Dražen Petrović Zagreb; Attendance: 1,791; Referees: Christos Christodoulou (GRE), Piotr Pastusiak (POL), Carlos Peruga (ESP)

25 March 2016	Anadolu Efes (Turkey)	87–67	(Spain) Unicaja	Istanbul, Turkey
20:45 (CET)	Scoring by quarter: 27–11, 22–19, 16–17, 22–20
	Pts: Heurtel, Šarić 17; Rebs: Šarić 11; Asts: Heurtel 13; PIR: Heurtel, Šarić 28	Boxscore	Pts: Nelson 12; Rebs: Cooley, Díez 5 Asts: Jackson, Thomas 3 PIR: Nelson 16	Arena: Abdi İpekçi Arena; Attendance: 2,658; Referees: Robert Lottermoser (GER), Borys Ryzhyk (UKR), David Romano (ISR)

31 March 2016	Lokomotiv Kuban (Russia)	81–60	(Spain) Unicaja	Krasnodar, Russia
18:00 (CEST)	Scoring by quarter: 18–14, 21–21, 23–20, 19–5
	Pts: Delaney, Janning 15; Rebs: Randolph 8 Asts: Delaney 10; PIR: Delaney 24	Boxscore	Pts: Kuzminskas 16; Rebs: 3 players 7 Asts: Nelson 3 PIR: Thomas 20	Arena: Basket Hall; Attendance: 5,871; Referees: Sreten Radović (CRO), Damir Javor (SLO), Amit Balak (ISR)

31 March 2016	Crvena zvezda Telekom (Serbia)	61–80	(Turkey) Darüşşafaka Doğuş	Belgrade, Serbia
20:00 (CEST)	Scoring by quarter: 20–15, 14–20, 15–20, 12–25
	Pts: Miller 18; Rebs: Miller 7 Asts: Gudurić 4 PIR: Miller 16	Boxscore	Pts: Wilbekin 19; Rebs: Bjelica, Slaughter 6 Asts: Gordon 6 PIR: Gordon 27	Arena: Kombank Arena; Attendance: 18,078; Referees: Fernando Rocha (POR), Spiros Gkontas (GRE), Joseph Bissang (FRA)

1 April 2016	Fenerbahçe (Turkey)	90–86	(Turkey) Anadolu Efes	Istanbul, Turkey
19:30 (CEST)	Scoring by quarter: 19–16, 18–18, 29–16, 24–36
	Pts: Datome 24; Rebs: Datome 7 Asts: Dixon 6 PIR: Datome 25	Boxscore	Pts: Heurtel 14; Rebs: Šarić 7 Asts: Heurtel 13; PIR: Heurtel 25	Arena: Ülker Sports Arena; Attendance: 7,043; Referees: Carmelo Paternico (ITA), Vicente Bultó (ESP), Petros Papapetrou (GRE)

1 April 2016	Panathinaikos (Greece)	76–60	(Croatia) Cedevita	Athens, Greece
20:45 (CEST)	Scoring by quarter: 20–5, 22–14, 16–18, 18–23
	Pts: Gist 15; Rebs: Gist 9 Asts: Calathes 6 PIR: Diamantidis, Gist 19	Boxscore	Pts: Arapović 11; Rebs: Arapović 8 Asts: Pilepić 3 PIR: Arapović 15	Arena: Olympic Sports Center Athens; Attendance: 16,366; Referees: Luigi Lamonica (ITA), Oļegs Latiševs (LAT), Carlos Cortés (ESP)

7 April 2016	Anadolu Efes (Turkey)	91–86	(Greece) Panathinaikos	Istanbul, Turkey
19:30 (CEST)	Scoring by quarter: 17–23, 26–29, 18–14, 30–20
	Pts: Šarić 15; Rebs: Šarić 5 Asts: Heurtel 9 PIR: Dunston, Šarić 17	Boxscore	Pts: three players 14; Rebs: Calathes 8 Asts: Calathes 10; PIR: Calathes 28	Arena: Abdi İpekçi Arena; Attendance: 3,323; Referees: Daniel Hierrezuelo (ESP), Matej Boltauzer (SLO), Eddie Viator (FRA)

8 April 2016	Cedevita (Croatia)	83–62	(Serbia) Crvena zvezda Telekom	Zagreb, Croatia
19:00 (CEST)	Scoring by quarter: 29–12, 23–19, 16–14, 15–17
	Pts: Pullen 22; Rebs: Bilan 6 Asts: Gordić, White 3 PIR: Pullen 29	Boxscore	Pts: Štimac 18; Rebs: Štimac 11; Asts: Micić 5 PIR: Štimac 28	Arena: Dražen Petrović Zagreb; Attendance: 1,497; Referees: Miguel Ángel Pérez Pérez (ESP), Robert Lottermoser (GER), Seffi Shemmesh (ISR)

8 April 2016	Darüşşafaka Doğuş (Turkey)	87–86	(Russia) Lokomotiv Kuban	Istanbul, Turkey
19:00 (CEST)	Scoring by quarter: 20–23, 18–24, 26–19, 23–20
	Pts: Harangody 15; Rebs: Aldemir, Harangody 7 Asts: Arslan 8 PIR: Aldemir, Harangody 16	Boxscore	Pts: Claver, Singleton 12; Rebs: Singleton 7 Asts: Delaney, Draper 4 PIR: Singleton 16	Arena: Volkswagen Arena; Attendance: 4,278; Referees: Milivoje Jovčić (SRB), Emilio Pérez Pizarro (ESP), Miloš Koljenšić (MNE)

8 April 2016	Unicaja (Spain)	71–67	(Turkey) Fenerbahçe	Málaga, Spain
20:45 (CEST)	Scoring by quarter: 23–20, 16–8, 19–20, 13–19
	Pts: Cooley 17; Rebs: Cooley 9 Asts: Jackson, Suárez 4 PIR: Cooley 26	Boxscore	Pts: Antić, Hickman 12; Rebs: Udoh 6 Asts: Hickman 5 PIR: Sloukas 12	Arena: Martín Carpena; Attendance: 4,656; Referees: Luigi Lamonica (ITA), Saša Pukl (SLO), Ioannis Foufis (GRE)

=== Group F ===
Pos	Team	Pld	W	L	PF	PA	PD	Qualification
1	(Russia) CSKA Moscow	14	10	4	1299	1185	+114	Advance to Playoffs
2	(Spain) Laboral Kutxa	14	9	5	1110	1075	+35	Advance to Playoffs
3	(Spain) FC Barcelona Lassa	14	8	6	1085	1059	+26	Advance to Playoffs
4	(Spain) Real Madrid	14	7	7	1173	1165	+8	Advance to Playoffs
5	(Russia) Khimki	14	7	7	1164	1138	+26	
6	(Germany) Brose Baskets	14	7	7	1073	1088	−15	
7	(Greece) Olympiacos	14	6	8	1083	1105	−22	
8	(Lithuania) Žalgiris	14	2	12	1007	1179	−172	

Source: Euroleague

29 December 2015	Khimki (Russia)	91–89	(Russia) CSKA Moscow	Moscow, Russia
18:00 (CET)	Scoring by quarter: 21–29, 20–22, 28–20, 22–18
	Pts: Shved 28; Rebs: four players 4 Asts: Rice, Shved 5 PIR: Shved 33	Boxscore	Pts: de Colo 20; Rebs: Kurbanov 5 Asts: Teodosić 7 PIR: de Colo 20	Arena: Krylatskoye Sports Palace; Attendance: 3,500; Referees: Ilija Belošević (SRB), Jakub Zamojski (POL), David Romano (ISR)

29 December 2015	Olympiacos (Greece)	74–62	(Spain) FC Barcelona Lassa	Piraeus, Greece
20:00 (CET)	Scoring by quarter: 14–14, 25–12, 17–14, 18–22
	Pts: Spanoulis 11; Rebs: Papapetrou 7 Asts: Spanoulis 9 PIR: Spanoulis, Strawberry 14	Boxscore	Pts: Tomić 16; Rebs: Samuels 7 Asts: Ribas 8 PIR: Tomić 17	Arena: Peace and Friendship Stadium; Attendance: 11,144; Referees: Luigi Lamonica (ITA), Eddie Viator (FRA), Miloš Koljenšić (MNE)

30 December 2015	Žalgiris (Lithuania)	68–89	(Spain) Laboral Kutxa	Kaunas, Lithuania
18:45 (CET)	Scoring by quarter: 14–33, 26–22, 15–9, 13–25
	Pts: Hanlan 16; Rebs: Ulanovas 10; Asts: Hanlan 3 PIR: Vougioukas 17	Boxscore	Pts: Adams 16; Rebs: Hanga 10; Asts: Adams, Causeur 4 PIR: Hanga 25	Arena: Žalgirio Arena; Attendance: 12,793; Referees: Saša Pukl (SLO), Petri Mäntylä (FIN), Marko Juras (SRB)

30 December 2015	Real Madrid (Spain)	82–79	(Germany) Brose Baskets	Madrid, Spain
20:45 (CET)	Scoring by quarter: 13–19, 17–21, 27–20, 25–19
	Pts: Rodríguez 22; Rebs: Ayón 8 Asts: Rodríguez 8 PIR: Rodríguez 28	Boxscore	Pts: Strēlnieks 16; Rebs: Miller 7 Asts: Strēlnieks 5 PIR: Strēlnieks 19	Arena: Barclaycard Center; Attendance: 9,283; Referees: Milivoje Jovčić (SRB), Damir Javor (SLO), Boris Shulga (UKR)

7 January 2016	CSKA Moscow (Russia)	95–81	(Spain) Real Madrid	Moscow, Russia
18:00 (CET)	Scoring by quarter: 22–20, 28–21, 21–23, 24–17
	Pts: de Colo 28; Rebs: three players 5 Asts: de Colo, Teodosić 7 PIR: de Colo 29	Boxscore	Pts: Rivers 23; Rebs: Ayón 10; Asts: Rodríguez 13; PIR: Ayón, Rivers 23	Arena: USH CSKA; Attendance: 5,000; Referees: Sreten Radović (CRO), Carmelo Paternico (ITA), Sašo Petek (SLO)

7 January 2016	Laboral Kutxa (Spain)	76–82	(Greece) Olympiacos	Vitoria-Gasteiz, Spain
20:30 (CET)	Scoring by quarter: 18–24, 16–19, 22–19, 20–20
	Pts: James 16; Rebs: Hanga 8 Asts: Adams, Causeur 3 PIR: Bourousis 22	Boxscore	Pts: Spanoulis 19; Rebs: Agravanis, Athinaiou 4 Asts: Hackett, Mantzaris 3 PIR: Hunter 18	Arena: Fernando Buesa Arena; Attendance: 10,237; Referees: Ilija Belošević (SRB), Matej Boltauzer (SLO), Oļegs Latiševs (LAT)

7 January 2016	FC Barcelona Lassa (Spain)	87–70	(Russia) Khimki	Barcelona, Spain
20:45 (CET)	Scoring by quarter: 23–16, 26–13, 18–22, 20–19
	Pts: Navarro, Ribas 14; Rebs: Ribas 6 Asts: three players 4 PIR: Ribas 19	Boxscore	Pts: Rice 14; Rebs: Augustine, Sokolov 7 Asts: Rice 7 PIR: three players 13	Arena: Palau Blaugrana; Attendance: 5,731; Referees: Milivoje Jovčić (SRB), Saša Pukl (SLO), Tolga Sahin (ITA)

8 January 2016	Brose Baskets (Germany)	96–63	(Lithuania) Žalgiris	Bamberg, Germany
20:00 (CET)	Scoring by quarter: 24–13, 25–16, 22–23, 25–11
	Pts: Strēlnieks 19; Rebs: Melli 10; Asts: Wanamaker 9 PIR: Zisis 26	Boxscore	Pts: Hanlan 17; Rebs: Ulanovas 7 Asts: Kalnietis 8 PIR: Hanlan 15	Arena: Brose Arena; Attendance: 6,661; Referees: Fernando Rocha (POR), Elias Koromilas (GRE), Carlos Peruga (ESP)

14 January 2016	CSKA Moscow (Russia)	93–82	(Spain) FC Barcelona Lassa	Moscow, Russia
18:00 (CET)	Scoring by quarter: 28–29, 26–17, 22–13, 17–23
	Pts: Higgins 20; Rebs: Vorontsevich 9 Asts: Teodosić 6 PIR: Vorontsevich 25	Boxscore	Pts: Navarro 16; Rebs: Tomić 8 Asts: four players 3 PIR: Doellman 19	Arena: Megasport Arena; Attendance: 11,783; Referees: Robert Lottermoser (GER), Damir Javor (SLO), Piotr Pastusiak (POL)

15 January 2016	Khimki (Russia)	76–68	(Spain) Laboral Kutxa	Moscow, Russia
18:00 (CET)	Scoring by quarter: 17–12, 22–27, 20–9, 17–20
	Pts: Shved 24; Rebs: Augustine 8 Asts: Rice 13; PIR: Augustine 29	Boxscore	Pts: four players 9 Rebs: Causeur 8 Asts: Adams 5 PIR: Hanga 15	Arena: Krylatskoye Sports Palace; Attendance: 1,800; Referees: Luigi Lamonica (ITA), Fernando Rocha (POR), Sašo Petek (SLO)

15 January 2016	Real Madrid (Spain)	92–86	(Lithuania) Žalgiris	Madrid, Spain
20:45 (CET)	Scoring by quarter: 26–18, 19–24, 20–11, 27–33
	Pts: Reyes 24; Rebs: Ayón 15; Asts: Rodríguez 9 PIR: Reyes 32	Boxscore	Pts: Seibutis 13; Rebs: Sajus 5 Asts: Kalnietis 6 PIR: Seibutis 17	Arena: Barclaycard Center; Attendance: 10,271; Referees: Christos Christodoulou (GRE), Ilija Belošević (SRB), Tolga Sahin (ITA)

15 January 2016	Olympiacos (Greece)	72–77	(Germany) Brose Baskets	Piraeus, Greece
20:45 (CET)	Scoring by quarter: 10–18, 16–21, 21–20, 25–18
	Pts: Strawberry 15; Rebs: Printezis 7 Asts: Johnson-Odom, Mantzaris 3 PIR: Strawberry 23	Boxscore	Pts: Miller 23; Rebs: Melli 13; Asts: Melli 6 PIR: Melli 22	Arena: Peace and Friendship Stadium; Attendance: 8,878; Referees: Daniel Hierrezuelo (ESP), Joseph Bissang (FRA), Ersan Kartal (TUR)

21 January 2016	Laboral Kutxa (Spain)	81–71	(Russia) CSKA Moscow	Vitoria-Gasteiz, Spain
20:30 (CET)	Scoring by quarter: 18–10, 16–24, 23–20, 24–17
	Pts: Bourousis 19; Rebs: Bourousis 13; Asts: Adams 6 PIR: Bourousis 30	Boxscore	Pts: Teodosić 18; Rebs: Hines 11; Asts: Teodosić 7 PIR: Teodosić 21	Arena: Fernando Buesa Arena; Attendance: 11,528; Referees: Borys Rhyzhyk (UKR), Milivoje Jovčić (SRB), Eddie Viator (FRA)

21 January 2016	Real Madrid (Spain)	86–87	(Spain) FC Barcelona Lassa	Madrid, Spain
20:45 (CET)	Scoring by quarter: 27–17, 21–20, 15–25, 23–25
	Pts: Rodríguez 18; Rebs: Reyes 7 Asts: Rodríguez 13; PIR: Rodríguez 27	Boxscore	Pts: Doellman 24; Rebs: Lawal 6 Asts: Satoranský 8 PIR: Doellman 26	Arena: Barclaycard Center; Attendance: 12,018; Referees: Fernando Rocha (POR), Elias Koromilas (GRE), Oļegs Latiševs (LAT)

22 January 2016	Khimki (Russia)	78–61	(Germany) Brose Baskets	Moscow, Russia
18:00 (CET)	Scoring by quarter: 16–12, 14–16, 24–17, 24–16
	Pts: Shved 22; Rebs: Augustine 9 Asts: Shved 5 PIR: Shved 15	Boxscore	Pts: Wanamaker 13; Rebs: Theis 7 Asts: Wanamaker 7 PIR: Theis 15	Arena: Krylatskoye Sports Palace; Attendance: 2,500; Referees: Sreten Radović (CRO), Juan Carlos García González (ESP), Ioannis Foufis (GRE)

22 January 2016	Žalgiris (Lithuania)	75–55	(Greece) Olympiacos	Kaunas, Lithuania
18:45 (CET)	Scoring by quarter: 17–18, 16–9, 20–18, 22–10
	Pts: Jankūnas 18; Rebs: Ulanovas 7 Asts: Kalnietis 4 PIR: Jankūnas 24	Boxscore	Pts: Johnson-Odom 11; Rebs: Hunter 9 Asts: Spanoulis 3 PIR: Johnson-Odom, Milutinov 11	Arena: Žalgirio Arena; Attendance: 10,263; Referees: Miguel Ángel Pérez Pérez (ESP), Damir Javor (SLO), Srđan Dožai (CRO)

28 January 2016	CSKA Moscow (Russia)	91–70	(Germany) Brose Baskets	Moscow, Russia
18:00 (CET)	Scoring by quarter: 25–23, 30–11, 18–16, 18–20
	Pts: de Colo 19; Rebs: Kurbanov 10; Asts: Teodosić 6 PIR: de Colo 28	Boxscore	Pts: Zisis 12; Rebs: Harris 6 Asts: Melli, Zisis 4 PIR: Melli 17	Arena: Megasport Arena; Attendance: 7,813; Referees: Ilija Belošević (SRB), Oļegs Latiševs (LAT), Tomislav Hordov (CRO)

28 January 2016	Real Madrid (Spain)	84–72	(Greece) Olympiacos	Madrid, Spain
20:45 (CET)	Scoring by quarter: 17–19, 24–16, 22–13, 21–24
	Pts: Llull 18; Rebs: Ayón 10; Asts: Llull 7 PIR: Llull 22	Boxscore	Pts: Hackett, Hunter 14; Rebs: Hunter 11; Asts: Spanoulis 4 PIR: Hunter 20	Arena: Barclaycard Center; Attendance: 11,225; Referees: Robert Lottermoser (GER), Eddie Viator (FRA), Marko Juras (SRB)

29 January 2016	Khimki (Russia)	111–80	(Lithuania) Žalgiris	Moscow, Russia
18:00 (CET)	Scoring by quarter: 25–18, 27–20, 25–23, 34–19
	Pts: Rice 20; Rebs: Augustine 7 Asts: Rice 11; PIR: Rice 35	Boxscore	Pts: Seibutis 15; Rebs: Motum, Ulanovas 6 Asts: Lekavičius 4 PIR: Vougioukas 16	Arena: Krylatskoye Sports Palace; Attendance: 2,500; Referees: Daniel Hierrezuelo (ESP), Matej Boltauzer (SLO), Antonio Conde (ESP)

29 January 2016	FC Barcelona Lassa (Spain)	78–81OT	(Spain) Laboral Kutxa	Barcelona, Spain
21:00 (CET)	Scoring by quarter: 15–13, 14–18, 15–20, 26–19, Overtime: 8–11
	Pts: Abrines 21; Rebs: Lawal 10; Asts: Satoranský 5 PIR: Abrines 28	Boxscore	Pts: Bourousis 24; Rebs: Bourousis, Causeur 8 Asts: Bourousis, Shengelia 3 PIR: Bourousis 28	Arena: Palau Blaugrana; Attendance: 5,623; Referees: Christos Christodoulou (GRE), Carmelo Paternico (ITA), Joseph Bissang (FRA)

4 February 2016	Brose Baskets (Germany)	74–70	(Spain) FC Barcelona Lassa	Bamberg, Germany
20:00 (CET)	Scoring by quarter: 13–17, 22–15, 18–18, 21–20
	Pts: Strēlnieks 16; Rebs: Theis 8 Asts: Strēlnieks, Zisis 4 PIR: Melli, Miller 17	Boxscore	Pts: Doellman 19; Rebs: Doellman 7 Asts: Ribas 6 PIR: Doellman 19	Arena: Brose Arena; Attendance: 6,800; Referees: Milivoje Jovčić (SRB), Eddie Viator (FRA), Siniša Herceg (CRO)

5 February 2016	Žalgiris (Lithuania)	59–94	(Russia) CSKA Moscow	Kaunas, Lithuania
18:45 (CET)	Scoring by quarter: 11–26, 18–18, 16–22, 14–28
	Pts: Jankūnas 16; Rebs: Ulanovas 7 Asts: Vecvagars 3 PIR: Jankūnas 16	Boxscore	Pts: Teodosić 20; Rebs: Kurbanov 8 Asts: Jackson 7 PIR: de Colo 25	Arena: Žalgirio Arena; Attendance: 13,120; Referees: Luigi Lamonica (ITA), Sreten Radović (CRO), Vicente Bultó (ESP)

5 February 2016	Real Madrid (Spain)	68–77	(Spain) Laboral Kutxa	Madrid, Spain
20:45 (CET)	Scoring by quarter: 19–19, 18–22, 12–18, 19–18
	Pts: Rodríguez 18; Rebs: Hernangómez 8 Asts: Llull, Rodríguez 4 PIR: Rodríguez 18	Boxscore	Pts: Causeur 15; Rebs: Bourousis 14; Asts: Adams 4 PIR: Causeur 17	Arena: Barclaycard Center; Attendance: 11,088; Referees: Saša Pukl (SLO), Spiros Gkontas (GRE), Matej Boltauzer (SLO)

5 February 2016	Olympiacos (Greece)	89–77	(Russia) Khimki	Piraeus, Greece
20:45 (CET)	Scoring by quarter: 20–24, 18–19, 24–17, 27–17
	Pts: Printezis 30; Rebs: Hunter 10; Asts: Spanoulis 6 PIR: Printezis 37	Boxscore	Pts: Rice 14; Rebs: Honeycutt 9 Asts: Rice 8 PIR: Augustine 20	Arena: Peace and Friendship Stadium; Attendance: 10,000; Referees: Emilio Pérez Pizarro (ESP), Carmelo Paternico (ITA), Oļegs Latiševs (LAT)

11 February 2016	Khimki (Russia)	82–93	(Spain) Real Madrid	Moscow, Russia
18:00 (CET)	Scoring by quarter: 26–26, 24–17, 19–28, 13–22
	Pts: Augustine 20; Rebs: Augustine 7 Asts: Rice 9 PIR: Augustine 26	Boxscore	Pts: Ayón 24; Rebs: Ayón 13; Asts: Llull 11; PIR: Ayón 41	Arena: Krylatskoye Sports Palace; Attendance: 3,800; Referees: Luigi Lamonica (ITA), Tomislav Hordov (CRO), Sašo Petek (SLO)

11 February 2016	Laboral Kutxa (Spain)	90–64	(Germany) Brose Baskets	Vitoria-Gasteiz, Spain
20:45 (CET)	Scoring by quarter: 26–13, 23–17, 23–16, 18–18
	Pts: Bourousis 18; Rebs: Bourousis 11; Asts: Adams 5 PIR: Bourousis 28	Boxscore	Pts: Wanamaker 11; Rebs: Harris 6 Asts: Strēlnieks 5 PIR: Wanamaker 13	Arena: Fernando Buesa Arena; Attendance: 10,239; Referees: Elias Koromilas (GRE), Tolga Sahin (TUR), Boris Shulga (UKR)

12 February 2016	CSKA Moscow (Russia)	92–85	(Greece) Olympiacos	Moscow, Russia
18:45 (CET)	Scoring by quarter: 18–15, 23–18, 25–28, 26–24
	Pts: Teodosić 21; Rebs: Freeland 7 Asts: Teodosić 5 PIR: Teodosić 27	Boxscore	Pts: Printezis 19; Rebs: Printezis 9 Asts: Spanoulis 6 PIR: Printezis 22	Arena: Megasport Arena; Attendance: 12,473; Referees: Daniel Hierrezuelo (ESP), Fernando Rocha (POR), Sašo Petek (SLO)

12 February 2016	FC Barcelona Lassa (Spain)	92–86	(Lithuania) Žalgiris	Barcelona, Spain
21:00 (CET)	Scoring by quarter: 16–19, 22–12, 27–24, 27–31
	Pts: Navarro 14; Rebs: Doellman, Lawal 8 Asts: Oleson, Ribas 5 PIR: Doellman 20	Boxscore	Pts: Seibutis 19; Rebs: Jankūnas 7 Asts: Seibutis 4 PIR: Ulanovas 30	Arena: Palau Blaugrana; Attendance: 6,286; Referees: Ilija Belošević (SRB), Piotr Pastusiak (POL), Petri Mäntylä (FIN)

25 February 2016	CSKA Moscow (Russia)	108–98	(Russia) Khimki	Moscow, Russia
17:00 (CET)	Scoring by quarter: 28–23, 25–23, 24–20, 31–32
	Pts: Teodosić 26; Rebs: Khryapa 11; Asts: de Colo 8 PIR: de Colo 28	Boxscore	Pts: Rice, Shved 16; Rebs: Boone 7 Asts: Rice 12; PIR: Rice 18	Arena: Megasport Arena; Attendance: 10,543; Referees: Miguel Ángel Pérez Pizarro (ESP), Robert Lottermosser (GER), Damir Javor (SLO)

25 February 2016	Brose Baskets (Germany)	86–90	(Spain) Real Madrid	Nuremberg, Germany
20:00 (CET)	Scoring by quarter: 26–23, 19–23, 20–26, 21–18
	Pts: Miller 20; Rebs: Melli 7 Asts: Zisis 4 PIR: Miller 20	Boxscore	Pts: Llull 21; Rebs: Ayón 7 Asts: Rodríguez 10; PIR: Llull 25	Arena: Arena Nürnberger Versicherung; Attendance: 8,200; Referees: Christos Christodoulou (GRE), Sreten Radović (CRO), Milija Vojinović (SRB)

25 February 2016	Laboral Kutxa (Spain)	71–65	(Lithuania) Žalgiris	Vitoria-Gasteiz, Spain
20:30 (CET)	Scoring by quarter: 22–20, 10–12, 13–21, 26–12
	Pts: Adams 17; Rebs: Bourousis 11; Asts: Adams 3 PIR: Bourousis 22	Boxscore	Pts: Jankūnas, Vougioukas 13; Rebs: Vougioukas 13; Asts: Ulanovas 5 PIR: Jankūnas 13	Arena: Fernando Buesa Arena; Attendance: 10,649; Referees: Milivoje Jovčić (SRB), Oļegs Latiševs (LAT), Saverio Lanzarini (ITA)

26 February 2016	FC Barcelona Lassa (Spain)	82–66	(Greece) Olympiacos	Barcelona, Spain
20:45 (CET)	Scoring by quarter: 19–19, 26–12, 26–16, 11–19
	Pts: Perperoglou 16; Rebs: Dorsey 8 Asts: Satoranský 5 PIR: Perperoglou 21	Boxscore	Pts: Hackett 16; Rebs: Hunter, Printezis 7 Asts: three players 2 PIR: Printezis 19	Arena: Palau Blaugrana; Attendance: 6,279; Referees: Luigi Lamonica (ITA), Borys Rhyzhyk (UKR), Miloš Koljenšić (MNE)

2 March 2016	Real Madrid (Spain)	87–96	(Russia) CSKA Moscow	Madrid, Spain
20:45 (CET)	Scoring by quarter: 18–18, 19–24, 25–22, 25–32
	Pts: Ayón 20; Rebs: Ayón 12; Asts: Llull 10; PIR: Ayón 29	Boxscore	Pts: Hines 16; Rebs: Kurbanov 8 Asts: de Colo 8 PIR: Khryapa 19	Arena: Barclaycard Center; Attendance: 11,792; Referees: Milivoje Jovčić (SRB), Carmelo Paternico (ITA), Oļegs Latiševs (LAT)

3 March 2016	Khimki (Russia)	75–61	(Spain) FC Barcelona Lassa	Moscow, Russia
18:00 (CET)	Scoring by quarter: 24–14, 24–15, 13–14, 14–18
	Pts: Shved 16; Rebs: Honeycutt 10; Asts: Rice 7 PIR: Shved, Honeycutt 22	Boxscore	Pts: Doellman 14; Rebs: Doellman 7 Asts: Satoranský 4 PIR: Doellman 16	Arena: Krylatskoye Sports Palace; Attendance: 3,800; Referees: Christos Christodoulou (GRE), Sreten Radović (CRO), Amit Balak (ISR)

4 March 2016	Žalgiris (Lithuania)	75–73	(Germany) Brose Baskets	Kaunas, Lithuania
18:45 (CET)	Scoring by quarter: 25–19, 16–19, 18–17, 16–18
	Pts: Jankūnas 17; Rebs: Jankūnas 13; Asts: Randle 5 PIR: Jankūnas 27	Boxscore	Pts: Zisis 25; Rebs: Melli 6 Asts: Zisis 4 PIR: Zisis 35	Arena: Žalgirio Arena; Attendance: 9,195; Referees: Fernando Rocha (POR), Saša Pukl (SLO), Tomislav Hordov (CRO)

4 March 2016	Olympiacos (Greece)	82–68	(Spain) Laboral Kutxa	Piraeus, Greece
20:45 (CET)	Scoring by quarter: 19–16, 25–14, 19–17, 19–21
	Pts: Printezis 17; Rebs: Hunter, Printezis 5 Asts: Spanoulis 8 PIR: Printezis 19	Boxscore	Pts: Bourousis 19; Rebs: Bourousis 7 Asts: Hanga, James 4 PIR: Bourousis 23	Arena: Peace and Friendship Stadium; Attendance: 10,040; Referees: Ilija Belošević (SRB), Robert Lottermoser (GER), Eddie Viator (FRA)

10 March 2016	Brose Baskets (Germany)	72–71	(Greece) Olympiacos	Bamberg, Germany
20:00 (CET)	Scoring by quarter: 19–21, 19–16, 13–19, 21–15
	Pts: Radošević, Wanamaker 11; Rebs: three players 5 Asts: Strēlnieks 6 PIR: Strēlnieks 19	Boxscore	Pts: Printezis 19; Rebs: Printezis 10; Asts: Spanoulis 9 PIR: Printezis 26	Arena: Brose Arena; Attendance: 6,800; Referees: Milivoje Jovčić (SRB), Vicente Bultó (ESP), Oļegs Latiševs (LAT)

10 March 2016	Laboral Kutxa (Spain)	98–83	(Russia) Khimki	Vitoria-Gasteiz, Spain
20:45 (CET)	Scoring by quarter: 21–24, 24–22, 27–15, 26–22
	Pts: Adams, Causeur 17; Rebs: Bourousis 13; Asts: Bourousis 6 PIR: Bourousis 29	Boxscore	Pts: Shved 19; Rebs: Boone 6 Asts: Rice 10; PIR: Shved 21	Arena: Fernando Buesa Arena; Attendance: 12,189; Referees: Saša Pukl (SLO), Fernando Rocha (POR), Marcin Kowalski (POL)

11 March 2016	Žalgiris (Lithuania)	75–90	(Spain) Real Madrid	Kaunas, Lithuania
18:45 (CET)	Scoring by quarter: 17–13, 24–26, 12–23, 22–28
	Pts: Jankūnas 21; Rebs: Jankūnas 8 Asts: Randle 6 PIR: Jankūnas 35	Boxscore	Pts: Nocioni 22; Rebs: Reyes 8 Asts: Rodríguez 8 PIR: Nocioni 23	Arena: Žalgirio Arena; Attendance: 12,567; Referees: Damir Javor (SLO), Srđan Dožai (CRO), Tolga Sahin (ITA)

11 March 2016	FC Barcelona Lassa (Spain)	100–98(OT)	(Russia) CSKA Moscow	Barcelona, Spain
20:45 (CET)	Scoring by quarter: 21–24, 26–14, 13–26, 25–21, Overtime: 15–13
	Pts: Tomić 21; Rebs: Doellman 10; Asts: Doellman 4 PIR: Satoranský 25	Boxscore	Pts: de Colo 30; Rebs: de Colo, Teodosić 7 Asts: Teodosić 6 PIR: de Colo 33	Arena: Palau Blaugrana; Attendance: 6,778; Referees: Ilija Belošević (SRB), Piotr Pastusiak (POL), Boris Shulga (UKR)

17 March 2016	CSKA Moscow (Russia)	90–78	(Spain) Laboral Kutxa	Moscow, Russia
18:00 (CET)	Scoring by quarter: 20–14, 20–12, 28–30, 22–22
	Pts: de Colo 22; Rebs: Freeland 10; Asts: Teodosić 6 PIR: de Colo 27	Boxscore	Pts: Hanga 19; Rebs: Bourousis 9 Asts: Adams, James 4 PIR: Hanga 30	Arena: Megasport Arena; Attendance: 9,021; Referees: Christos Christodoulou (GRE), Luigi Lamonica (ITA), Jurgis Laurinavičius (LTU)

17 March 2016	FC Barcelona Lassa (Spain)	72–65	(Spain) Real Madrid	Barcelona, Spain
20:45 (CET)	Scoring by quarter: 25–4, 15–24, 12–23, 20–14
	Pts: Perperoglou 20; Rebs: Dorsey 10; Asts: Satoranský 3 PIR: Satoranský 20	Boxscore	Pts: Ayón 16; Rebs: Ayón 7 Asts: Rodríguez 6 PIR: Ayón 18	Arena: Palau Blaugrana; Attendance: 7,142; Referees: Robert Lottermoser (GER), Eddie Viator (FRA), Matej Boltauzer (SLO)

17 March 2016	Brose Baskets (Germany)	84–79	(Russia) Khimki	Bamberg, Germany
22:00 (CET)	Scoring by quarter: 16–17, 24–23, 16–24, 28–15
	Pts: Wanamaker 25; Rebs: Melli 13; Asts: Zisis 8 PIR: Wanamaker 34	Boxscore	Pts: Dragić, Shved 14; Rebs: Monia 11; Asts: Rice 11; PIR: Rice 18	Arena: Brose Arena; Attendance: 6,203; Referees: Ilija Belošević (SRB), Borys Rhyzhyk (UKR), Carlos Peruga (ESP)

18 March 2016	Olympiacos (Greece)	74–59	(Lithuania) Žalgiris	Piraeus, Greece
20:45 (CET)	Scoring by quarter: 14–15, 25–15, 19–11, 16–18
	Pts: Printezis 17; Rebs: Hunter 11; Asts: Spanoulis 6 PIR: Printezis 15	Boxscore	Pts: Vougioukas 14; Rebs: Jankūnas 7 Asts: Vecvagars 3 PIR: Vougioukas 20	Arena: Peace and Friendship Stadium; Attendance: 7,297; Referees: Miguel Ángel Pérez Pérez (ESP), Carmelo Paternico (ITA), Piotr Pastusiak (POL)

23 March 2016	Laboral Kutxa (Spain)	75–71	(Spain) FC Barcelona Lassa	Vitoria-Gasteiz, Spain
20:30 (CET)	Scoring by quarter: 15–16, 25–17, 16–12, 19–26
	Pts: Bourousis 22; Rebs: Bourousis, Hanga 7 Asts: James 5 PIR: Bourousis 23	Boxscore	Pts: Satoranský 20; Rebs: Dorsey 6 Asts: Satoranský 6 PIR: Satoranský 26	Arena: Fernando Buesa Arena; Attendance: 12,789; Referees: Milivoje Jovčić (SRB), Oļegs Latiševs (LAT), Ioannis Foufis (GRE)

24 March 2016	Brose Baskets (Germany)	91–83	(Russia) CSKA Moscow	Bamberg, Germany
20:45 (CET)	Scoring by quarter: 22–20, 21–19, 25–28, 23–16
	Pts: Melli 17; Rebs: Theis 8 Asts: three players 6 PIR: Melli 23	Boxscore	Pts: de Colo 21; Rebs: Kurbanov 6 Asts: de Colo 7 PIR: de Colo 21	Arena: Brose Arena; Attendance: 6,800; Referees: Sreten Radović (CRO), Miguel Ángel Pérez Pérez (ESP), Miloš Koljenšić (MNE)

25 March 2016	Žalgiris (Lithuania)	71–76	(Russia) Khimki	Kaunas, Lithuania
18:45 (CET)	Scoring by quarter: 17–20, 20–15, 12–21, 22–20
	Pts: Ulanovas 17; Rebs: Jankūnas 8 Asts: Randle 4 PIR: Jankūnas 23	Boxscore	Pts: Rice 17; Rebs: Honeycutt 17; Asts: Shved 5 PIR: Honeycutt 30	Arena: Žalgirio Arena; Attendance: 8,702; Referees: Luigi Lamonica (ITA) Elias Koromilas (GRE), Sašo Petek (SLO)

25 March 2016	Olympiacos (Greece)	99–84	(Spain) Real Madrid	Piraeus, Greece
20:45 (CET)	Scoring by quarter: 23–17, 30–16, 20–21, 26–30
	Pts: Mantzaris 19; Rebs: Papanikolaou 9 Asts: Spanoulis 6 PIR: Mantzaris, Printezis 19	Boxscore	Pts: Llull, Rivers 17; Rebs: Ayón 10; Asts: Rivers, Rodríguez 4 PIR: Rivers 21	Arena: Peace and Friendship Stadium; Attendance: 11,232; Referees: Fernando Rocha (POR), Saša Pukl (SLO), Milija Vojinović (SRB)

31 March 2016	Khimki (Russia)	98–66	(Greece) Olympiacos	Moscow, Russia
19:45 (CEST)	Scoring by quarter: 25–22, 23–14, 28–14, 22–16
	Pts: Koponen 21; Rebs: Augustine 10; Asts: Koponen, Rice 4 PIR: Augustine 28	Boxscore	Pts: Hunter 14; Rebs: Hunter 7 Asts: Spanoulis 4 PIR: Hunter 21	Arena: Krylatskoye Sports Palace; Attendance: 3,500; Referees: Daniel Hierrezuelo (ESP), Matej Boltauzer (SLO), Tomislav Hordov (CRO)

31 March 2016	FC Barcelona Lassa (Spain)	75–57	(Germany) Brose Baskets	Barcelona, Spain
20:45 (CEST)	Scoring by quarter: 18–12, 25–11, 16–18, 16–16
	Pts: Abrines 13; Rebs: Dorsey 9 Asts: Tomić 4 PIR: Dorsey 18	Boxscore	Pts: Wanamaker 16; Rebs: Wanamaker 8 Asts: Miller 4 PIR: Wanamaker 20	Arena: Palau Blaugrana; Attendance: 6,717; Referees: Christos Christodoulou (GRE), Saša Pukl (SLO), Sinisa Herceg (CRO)

1 April 2016	CSKA Moscow (Russia)	100–86	(Lithuania) Žalgiris	Moscow, Russia
19:00 (CEST)	Scoring by quarter: 21–23, 26–25, 27–13, 26–25
	Pts: de Colo 26; Rebs: de Colo 7 Asts: Teodosić 4 PIR: de Colo 35	Boxscore	Pts: Hanlan 15; Rebs: Vougioukas 7 Asts: Hanlan 6 PIR: Vougioukas 25	Arena: Megasport Arena; Attendance: 7,863; Referees: Milivoje Jovčić (SRB), Emilio Pérez Pizarro (ESP), Aare Halliko (FIN)

1 April 2016	Laboral Kutxa (Spain)	89–88	(Spain) Real Madrid	Vitoria-Gasteiz, Spain
20:30 (CEST)	Scoring by quarter: 11–21, 25–25, 31–21, 22–21
	Pts: James 27; Rebs: Bourousis 10; Asts: Adams 5 PIR: Bourousis 35	Boxscore	Pts: Rodríguez 18; Rebs: Ayón 8 Asts: Llull, Rodríguez 5 PIR: Rodríguez 22	Arena: Fernando Buesa Arena; Attendance: 13,726; Referees: Ilija Belošević (SRB), Elias Koromilas (GRE), Petri Mäntylä (FIN)

7 April 2016	Žalgiris (Lithuania)	59–66	(Spain) FC Barcelona Lassa	Kaunas, Lithuania
18:45 (CEST)	Scoring by quarter: 16–16, 18–12, 14–21, 11–17
	Pts: Vecvagars 13; Rebs: Jankūnas 9 Asts: Ulanovas 4 PIR: Jankūnas 15	Boxscore	Pts: Ribas 12; Rebs: Ribas 13; Asts: Satoranský 5 PIR: Ribas 25	Arena: Žalgirio Arena; Attendance: 9,090; Referees: Petri Mäntylä (FIN), Tolga Sahin (ITA), Tomislav Hordov (CRO)

7 April 2016	Brose Baskets (Germany)	89–69	(Spain) Laboral Kutxa	Bamberg, Germany
20:00 (CEST)	Scoring by quarter: 29–14, 16–14, 18–24, 26–17
	Pts: Theis 21; Rebs: Miller 6 Asts: Zisis 9 PIR: Miller 22	Boxscore	Pts: Blažič 19; Rebs: Blažič 6 Asts: Adams 7 PIR: Blažič 20	Arena: Brose Arena; Attendance: 5,700; Referees: Fernando Rocha (POR), Damir Javor (SLO), Aare Halliko (EST)

7 April 2016	Real Madrid (Spain)	83–70	(Russia) Khimki	Madrid, Spain
20:45 (CEST)	Scoring by quarter: 33–28, 21–21, 12–9, 17–12
	Pts: Carroll 23; Rebs: Reyes 8 Asts: Rodríguez 10; PIR: Reyes 22	Boxscore	Pts: Rice 24; Rebs: Augustine 7 Asts: Rice 4 PIR: Rice 26	Arena: Barclaycard Center; Attendance: 11,805; Referees: Christos Christodoulou (GRE), Sreten Radović (CRO), Carmelo Paternico (ITA)

8 April 2016	Olympiacos (Greece)	96–99	(Russia) CSKA Moscow	Piraeus, Greece
20:45 (CEST)	Scoring by quarter: 25–33, 20–17, 24–14, 27–35
	Pts: Lojeski 18; Rebs: Agravanis 6 Asts: Spanoulis 7 PIR: Lojeski 18	Boxscore	Pts: De Colo 20; Rebs: Hines 9 Asts: Teodosić 8 PIR: De Colo 36	Arena: Peace and Friendship Stadium; Attendance: 9,087; Referees: Ilija Belošević (SRB), Borys Ryzhyk (UKR), Oļegs Latiševs (LAT)
