= 2016 Euroleague Playoffs =

Basketball competition

The 2016 Euroleague Playoffs was played from 12 April to 26 April 2016. A total of 8 teams competed in the Playoffs.

== Format ==
In the playoffs, teams playing against each other had to win three games to win the series. Thus, if one team won three games, before all five games had been played, the games that remained were omitted. The team that finished in the highest Top 16 place played the first, the second, and the fifth (if it was necessary) game of the series at home.

Game 1 was played on 12 and 13 April, game 2 was played on 14 and 15 April, game 3 was played on 18 and 19 April, game 4, if necessary, was played on 21 April, and game 5, if necessary, was played on 26 April 2016.

== Qualified teams ==
Group	1st (Seeded in playoffs)	2nd (Seeded in playoffs)	3rd (Unseeded in playoffs)	4th (Unseeded in playoffs)
E	(Turkey) Fenerbahçe	(Russia) Lokomotiv Kuban	(Greece) Panathinaikos	(Serbia) Crvena zvezda Telekom
F	(Russia) CSKA Moscow	(Spain) Laboral Kutxa	(Spain) FC Barcelona Lassa	(Spain) Real Madrid

== Series ==
Team 1	Series	Team 2	Game 1	Game 2	Game 3	Game 4	Game 5
Fenerbahçe (Turkey)	3–0	(Spain) Real Madrid	75–69	100–78	75–63		
Laboral Kutxa (Spain)	3–0	(Greece) Panathinaikos	84–68	82–78	84–75		
CSKA Moscow (Russia)	3–0	(Serbia) Crvena zvezda Telekom	84–74	77–76	78–71		
Lokomotiv Kuban (Russia)	3–2	(Spain) FC Barcelona Lassa	66–61	66–92	70–82	92–80	81–67

== Games ==
=== Game 1 ===
12 April 2016	CSKA Moscow (Russia)	84–74	(Serbia) Crvena zvezda Telekom	Moscow, Russia
19:00 (CEST)	Scoring by quarter: 25–20, 19–20, 19–16, 21–18
	Pts: Teodosić 23; Rebs: Vorontsevich 7 Asts: De Colo 10; PIR: Teodosić 28	Boxscore	Pts: Jović, Miller 14; Rebs: Zirbes 6 Asts: Jović 4 PIR: Miller 13	Arena: Megasport Arena; Attendance: 6,702; Referees: Daniel Hierrezuelo (ESP), Saša Pukl (SLO), Amit Balak (ISR)

12 April 2016	Fenerbahçe (Turkey)	75–69	(Spain) Real Madrid	Istanbul, Turkey
19:45 (CEST)	Scoring by quarter: 15–11, 26–18, 12–23, 22–17
	Pts: Bogdanović, Sloukas 17; Rebs: Kalinić, Udoh 7 Asts: Bogdanović 5 PIR: Bogdanović 19	Boxscore	Pts: Reyes 13; Rebs: Ayón 8 Asts: Llull 5 PIR: Llull 16	Arena: Ülker Sports Arena; Attendance: 12,826; Referees: Damir Javor (SLO), Milivoje Jovčić (SRB), Oļegs Latiševs (LAT)

13 April 2016	Lokomotiv Kuban (Russia)	66–61	(Spain) FC Barcelona Lassa	Krasnodar, Russia
19:00 (CEST)	Scoring by quarter: 17–19, 10–14, 23–20, 16–8
	Pts: Randolph 17; Rebs: Randolph 10; Asts: Delaney 7 PIR: Randolph 26	Boxscore	Pts: Doellman, Ribas 13; Rebs: Arroyo 6 Asts: Satoranský 8 PIR: Arroyo, Ribas 9	Arena: Basket Hall; Attendance: 7,235; Referees: Luigi Lamonica (ITA), Ilija Belošević (SRB), Robert Lottermoser (GER)

13 April 2016	Laboral Kutxa (Spain)	84–68	(Greece) Panathinaikos	Vitoria-Gasteiz, Spain
20:45 (CEST)	Scoring by quarter: 18–16, 21–12, 25–21, 20–19
	Pts: Adams 20; Rebs: Tillie 11; Asts: James 6 PIR: Bourousis 21	Boxscore	Pts: Raduljica 21; Rebs: Raduljica 6 Asts: Calathes 11; PIR: Raduljica 28	Arena: Fernando Buesa Arena; Attendance: 10,936; Referees: Sreten Radović (CRO), Borys Ryzhyk (UKR), Piotr Pastusiak (POL)

=== Game 2 ===
14 April 2016	CSKA Moscow (Russia)	77–76	(Serbia) Crvena zvezda Telekom	Moscow, Russia
19:00 (CEST)	Scoring by quarter: 20–20, 24–28, 19–12, 14–16
	Pts: Hines 19; Rebs: four players 4 Asts: De Colo, Jackson 3 PIR: Hines 25	Boxscore	Pts: Jović 15; Rebs: four players 5 Asts: Jović 7 PIR: Miller 18	Arena: Megasport Arena; Attendance: 8,107; Referees: Juan Carlos García González (ESP), Elias Koromilas (GRE), Sašo Petek (SLO)

14 April 2016	Fenerbahçe (Turkey)	100–78	(Spain) Real Madrid	Istanbul, Turkey
19:45 (CEST)	Scoring by quarter: 27–14, 27–15, 22–19, 24–30
	Pts: Udoh 18; Rebs: Antić 8 Asts: Sloukas 6 PIR: Udoh 25	Boxscore	Pts: Rodríguez 15; Rebs: Dončić 6 Asts: Fernández 3 PIR: Dončić, Rodríguez 15	Arena: Ülker Sports Arena; Attendance: 12,904; Referees: Christos Christodoulou (GRE), Eddie Viator (FRA), Matej Boltauzer (SLO)

15 April 2016	Lokomotiv Kuban (Russia)	66–92	(Spain) FC Barcelona Lassa	Krasnodar, Russia
19:00 (CEST)	Scoring by quarter: 19–24, 12–24, 18–23, 17–21
	Pts: Delaney 19; Rebs: Randolph 6 Asts: Claver 5 PIR: Delaney 22	Boxscore	Pts: Navarro 18; Rebs: Tomić 10; Asts: Satoranský 10; PIR: Satoranský 23	Arena: Basket Hall; Attendance: 7,457; Referees: Fernando Rocha (POR), Carmelo Paternico (ITA), Oļegs Latiševs (LAT)

15 April 2016	Laboral Kutxa (Spain)	82–78(OT)	(Greece) Panathinaikos	Vitoria-Gasteiz, Spain
20:45 (CEST)	Scoring by quarter: 16–21, 22–15, 16–15, 19–22, Overtime: 9–5
	Pts: Adams 24; Rebs: Bourousis 9 Asts: Bertāns, James 3 PIR: Adams, Bertāns 20	Boxscore	Pts: Diamantidis 17; Rebs: Gist 10; Asts: Diamantidis 6 PIR: Diamantidis 26	Arena: Fernando Buesa Arena; Attendance: 13,964; Referees: Saša Pukl (SLO), Milivoje Jovčić (SRB), Tolga Sahin (ITA)

=== Game 3 ===
18 April 2016	Crvena zvezda Telekom (Serbia)	71–78	(Russia) CSKA Moscow	Belgrade, Serbia
20:45 (CEST)	Scoring by quarter: 21–18, 14–18, 12–23, 24–19
	Pts: Miller 15; Rebs: Jović 6 Asts: Jović 6 PIR: Miller 16	Boxscore	Pts: De Colo 20; Rebs: Higgins 9 Asts: Teodosić 7 PIR: De Colo 19	Arena: Kombank Arena; Attendance: 18,027; Referees: Miguel Ángel Pérez Pérez (ESP), Carmelo Paternico (ITA), Petri Mäntylä (FIN)

19 April 2016	Panathinaikos (Greece)	75–84	(Spain) Laboral Kutxa	Athens, Greece
20:15 (CEST)	Scoring by quarter: 17–20, 20–22, 18–14, 20–28
	Pts: Raduljica 13; Rebs: Raduljica 8 Asts: Diamantidis 7 PIR: Diamantidis 18	Boxscore	Pts: Adams 24; Rebs: James 6 Asts: Bourousis 6 PIR: Adams 27	Arena: Olympic Sports Center Athens; Attendance: 16,419; Referees: Luigi Lamonica (ITA), Ilija Belošević (SRB), Oļegs Latiševs (LAT)

19 April 2016	Real Madrid (Spain)	63–75	(Turkey) Fenerbahçe	Madrid, Spain
20:45 (CEST)	Scoring by quarter: 13–18, 14–12, 13–24, 23–21
	Pts: Rodríguez 15; Rebs: Ayón 14; Asts: Rodríguez 4 PIR: Rodríguez 18	Boxscore	Pts: Bogdanović 17; Rebs: Udoh 12; Asts: Sloukas 5 PIR: Udoh 33	Arena: Barclaycard Center; Attendance: 11,349; Referees: Borys Ryzhyk (UKR), Robert Lottermoser (GER), Spiros Gkontas (GRE)

19 April 2016	FC Barcelona Lassa (Spain)	82–70	(Russia) Lokomotiv Kuban	Barcelona, Spain
20:45 (CEST)	Scoring by quarter: 19–23, 23–13, 19–14, 21–20
	Pts: Abrines 25; Rebs: Doellman 7 Asts: Ribas, Satoranský 4 PIR: Abrines 24	Boxscore	Pts: Randolph 16; Rebs: Randolph, Singleton 6 Asts: Claver, Broekhoff 2 PIR: Randolph 16	Arena: Palau Blaugrana; Attendance: 6,414; Referees: Christos Christodoulou (GRE), Damir Javor (SLO), Eddie Viator (FRA)

=== Game 4 ===
21 April 2016	FC Barcelona Lassa (Spain)	80–92(OT)	(Russia) Lokomotiv Kuban	Barcelona, Spain
20:45 (CEST)	Scoring by quarter: 19–21, 16–19, 19–11, 22–25, Overtime: 4–16
	Pts: Navarro 19; Rebs: Tomić 6 Asts: Navarro 4 PIR: Tomić 25	Boxscore	Pts: Randolph 28; Rebs: Claver 10; Asts: Delaney 7 PIR: Randolph 28	Arena: Palau Blaugrana; Attendance: 7,083; Referees: Sreten Radović (CRO), Borys Ryzhyk (UKR), Milivoje Jovčić (SRB)

=== Game 5 ===
26 April 2016	Lokomotiv Kuban (Russia)	81–67	(Spain) FC Barcelona Lassa	Krasnodar, Russia
19:00 (CEST)	Scoring by quarter: 26–21, 24–18, 8–23, 23–5
	Pts: Delaney 17; Rebs: Singleton 12; Asts: Delaney 6 PIR: Singleton 27	Boxscore	Pts: Perperoglou 13; Rebs: Tomić 8 Asts: Satoranský 7 PIR: Satoranský 15	Arena: Basket Hall; Attendance: 7,495; Referees: Luigi Lamonica (ITA), Robert Lottermosser (GER), Oļegs Latiševs (LAT)
