= Malcolm Delaney =

American basketball player (born 1989)

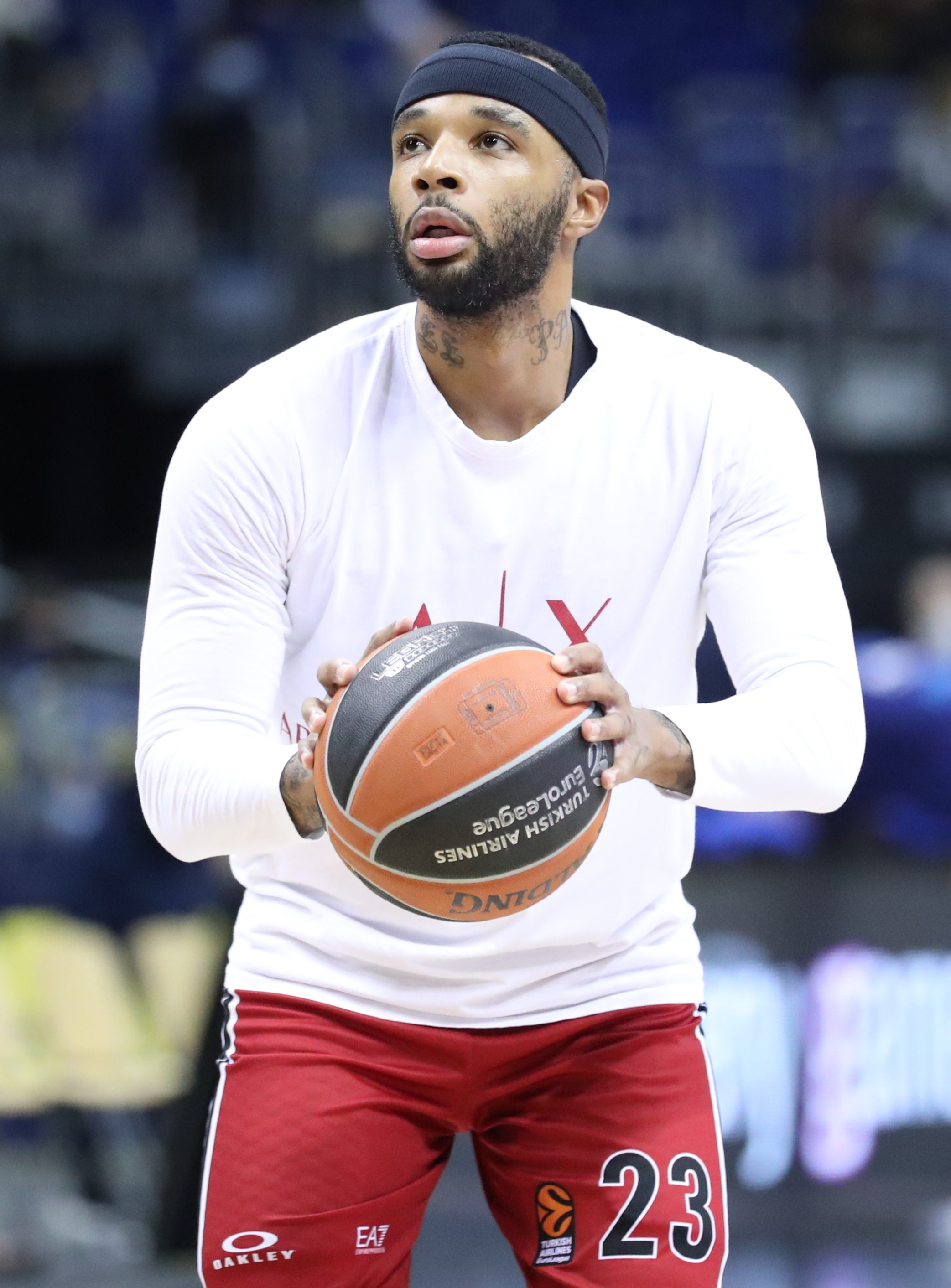
- Delaney with Olimpia Milano in 2021

Personal information
- Born: March 11, 1989 (age 37) Baltimore, Maryland, U.S.
- Listed height: 1.91 m (6 ft 3 in)
- Listed weight: 86 kg (190 lb)

Career information
- High school: Towson Catholic (Towson, Maryland)
- College: Virginia Tech (2007–2011)
- NBA draft: 2011: undrafted
- Playing career: 2011–2022
- Position: Point guard / shooting guard
- Number: 23, 0, 5

Career history
- 2011–2012: Élan Chalon
- 2012–2013: Budivelnyk
- 2013–2014: Bayern Munich
- 2014–2016: Lokomotiv Kuban
- 2016–2018: Atlanta Hawks
- 2018–2019: Guangdong Southern Tigers
- 2019–2020: FC Barcelona
- 2020–2022: Olimpia Milano

Career highlights
- All-EuroLeague First Team (2016); All-EuroCup First Team (2013); Lega Serie A champion (2022); 2× Italian Cup winner (2021, 2022); Italian Cup MVP (2022); Italian Super Cup winner (2020); Italian Super Cup MVP (2020); Bundesliga champion (2014); Bundesliga MVP (2014); Bundesliga Finals MVP (2014); All-Bundesliga First Team (2014); Ukrainian SuperLeague champion (2013); Ukrainian SuperLeague MVP (2013); All-Ukrainian SuperLeague First Team (2013); LNB Pro A champion (2012); French Leaders Cup winner (2012); 2× First-team All-ACC (2010, 2011); Third-team All-ACC (2009)
- Stats at NBA.com
- Stats at Basketball Reference

Malcolm Hakeem Delaney (born March 11, 1989) is an American former professional basketball player. He is from Baltimore, Maryland, and attended Towson Catholic High School. Delaney played college basketball for the Virginia Tech Hokies men's basketball team. At the end of his college career, Delaney declared for the 2011 NBA draft. He was not drafted, and instead began his professional basketball career overseas, playing one season each for Élan Chalon, Budivelnyk Kyiv, and Bayern Munich, and later joined Lokomotiv Kuban for two seasons. In 2016, he earned an All-EuroLeague First Team selection.

== Early life ==
Delaney was born in Baltimore, Maryland on March 11, 1989. His mother Patricia was a nurse and day care provider. His father Vincent Jr. was a top high school basketball player in Baltimore and later became a starter at Voorhees College in Denmark, South Carolina. Vincent Jr. returned from college as a social worker. Malcolm's older brother Vincent played NCAA Division II college football for Stonehill College in Easton, Massachusetts. In his childhood, Delaney led his Pop Warner youth football team to the national title. He also won a Little League Baseball home run derby. At age seven, Delaney dribbled and shot balls on the sidelines at an Amateur Athletic Union (AAU) team practice.

== High school ==
Delaney first attended McDonogh School in Owings Mills, Maryland, where he played football and basketball. He started for the Eagles' basketball team and helped them see great success during his freshman season. McDonogh most notably defeated Mount Saint Joseph High School, the top-ranked team in the Maryland Interscholastic Athletic Association (MIAA). Delaney also guided the Eagles to wins over ranked Cardinal Gibbons School and Towson Catholic High School.

Before his sophomore year, Delaney transferred to Towson Catholic, where he continued to play MIAA basketball under head coach Josh Pratt. He joined fellow sophomores Donté Greene and Ron Nicholson on the Owls' roster.

He averaged 20 points, four rebounds and four steals as a senior. Also played in the Nike All-American All-Star game and was co-MVP of the Spalding Hoopball Classic. Was an EA Sports second-team All-American, Charm City Classic MVP, Capital Classic All-Tournament team and Baltimore Catholic League Player of the Year. Delaney earned Gatorade Player of the Year/Mr. Maryland and was an All-County selection as a senior. At Towson Catholic, led team to the Baltimore Catholic League and MIAA Championships as a senior and scored 2,112 career points.

Delaney was the No. 89 ranked player in the country and No. 13 ranked point guard according to Rivals. He received offers from Virginia Tech, Clemson, Indiana, Iowa State and Maryland. He also played for AAU Team Melo and is friends with former New York Knicks star and Maryland native Carmelo Anthony. He committed to the Hokies on September 3, 2006.

== College career ==
=== Freshman year ===
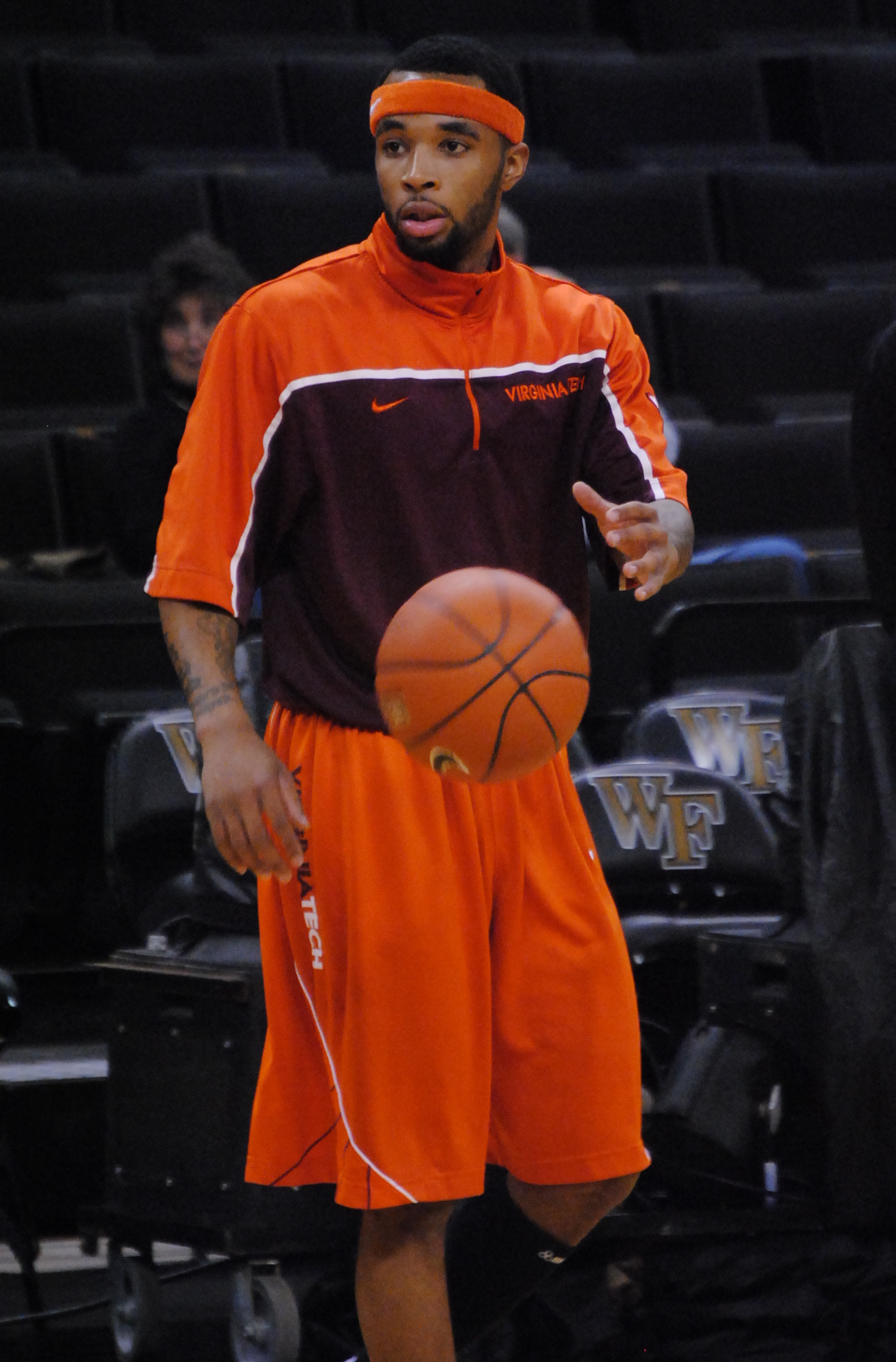
Delaney with Virginia Tech in 2011

Delaney finished second on the team in assists (107, 3.1 apg), fourth on the team in scoring (9.6 ppg) and minutes played (27.3) and fifth on the team in rebounding (2.9 rpg). He started the last 24 games of the season and appeared in all 35 games. He scored in double figures in all three Virginia Tech post-season games. He registered a career-high 20 points and tied a career-high in steals, with four, at UNC. He made the game-tying three-pointer with 52 seconds remaining against Maryland in the home victory.

=== Sophomore year ===
In his second season Delaney was named third-team All-ACC. He scored more than 20 points in 12 games and more than 15 points in 25 contests. Improved his scoring average and was second on the team in scoring, averaging 18.2 ppg. He was ranked among the ACC leaders in scoring (6th, 18.1 ppg), assists (5th, 4.5 apg), free throw percentage (3rd, 86.9%) and minutes played (2nd, 36.5). Delaney led the Hokies with 14 points and a career-high-tying 10 assists in the loss to Baylor in the second round of the NIT. He won the Lou Carnesecca Award, given to the most valuable player of the Aeropostale Holiday Festival, after averaging 23.5 ppg, 6.5 rpg, 6.0 apg and 3.0 spg for the tournament.

=== Junior year ===
In his junior year Delaney was a unanimous first-team All-ACC after recording a career-best 20.2 ppg for the season. He led the Hokies to the NIT quarterfinals and had 24 points in their season-ending loss to Rhode Island. Led the ACC in scoring and was the Sporting News' fourth-team All-America selection. Delaney led the ACC in trips to the free throw line and imparted his knowledge to teammate Dorenzo Hudson who made a career-high 20 free throws on 21 attempts in their victory over Seton Hall.

=== Collegiate statistics ===
| Year | Games Played | Minutes/Game | Points/Game | Rebounds/Game | Assists/Game | Steals/Game | Steals/Season |
|---|---|---|---|---|---|---|---|
| 2007–08 | 35 | 27.3 | 9.6 | 2.9 | 3.1 | 0.8 | 28 |
| 2008–09 | 34 | 36.9 | 18.1 | 4.0 | 4.5 | 1.5 | 50 |
| 2009–10 | 33 | 35.8 | 20.2 | 3.7 | 4.5 | 1.2 | 41 |
| 2010–11 | 34 | 38.2 | 18.7 | 3.5 | 4.0 | 1.6 | 56 |

=== 2010 NBA draft ===
Delaney entered the 2010 NBA draft on March 31, 2010, but did not hire an agent. He had until May 8 to withdraw from the Draft or forgo his senior season. On May 7, Delaney decided to return to the Hokies for his senior season. On ESPN he had been projected as a second round draft choice to undrafted.

== Professional career ==
=== Élan Chalon (2011–2012) ===
In 2011, after going undrafted, Delaney signed with the French team Élan Chalon in an agreement worth $130,000. The team plays in France's top professional league, LNB Pro A. In his first professional game, Delaney recorded 12 points and 8 assists in a 77–73 win over BCM Gravelines. On April 6, 2012, Delaney recorded his first career double-double after racking up 30 points and 10 assists in a 99–109 overtime loss to the Nanterre.

=== Budivelnyk Kyiv (2012–2013) ===
In 2012, Malcolm Delaney agreed to a deal to play for BC Budivelnyk in Kyiv, Ukraine. The club plays in the Ukrainian Basketball SuperLeague. He was named to the All-EuroCup First Team in 2013.

=== Bayern Munich (2013–2014) ===
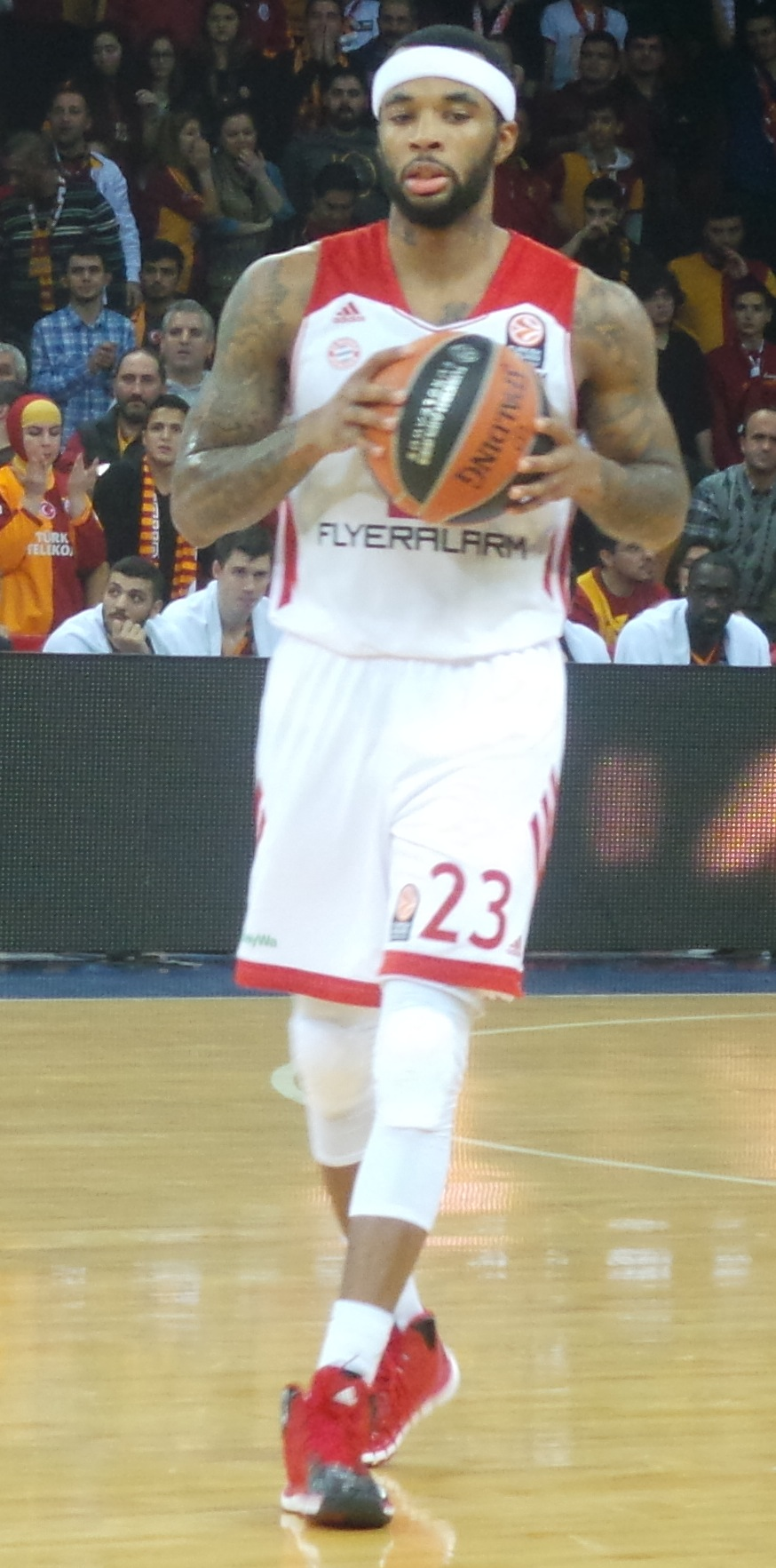
Delaney with Bayern Munich in 2014

In 2013, Delaney signed a one-year deal with the German team Bayern Munich. In April 2014, Delaney won the Basketball Bundesliga MVP award. Bayern won the German League title by beating Alba Berlin 3–1 in the Finals, and Delaney won the Finals MVP award.

=== Lokomotiv Kuban (2014–2016) ===
On July 2, 2014, Delaney signed a one-year deal with the Russian team PBC Lokomotiv Kuban. He later said the club was "aggressive" in trying to sign him and he had "never heard a bad word" about them.

In the summer of 2015, he re-signed with Lokomotiv for 2015–16 season. He led his team to the 2016 EuroLeague Final Four where Lokomotiv finished in third place. Delaney averaged 16.3 points, 5.5 assists and 3.4 rebounds over 31 EuroLeague games.

=== Atlanta Hawks (2016–2018) ===
On July 15, 2016, Delaney signed with the Atlanta Hawks on a 2-year, $5,000,000 deal. He made his NBA debut in the Hawks' season opener on October 27, 2016, recording four points and five assists in 20 minutes off the bench in a 114–99 win over the Washington Wizards. On February 24, 2017, in a 108–90 loss to the Miami Heat, Delaney had five points and four assists and made only 2 of 10 shots from the field in his first career start as a fill-in for Dennis Schröder.

Delaney never returned to the NBA after playing the 2017 - 2018 with the Hawks. Thus, his final NBA game was played on March 4, 2018 in a 113 - 112 win over the Phoenix Suns. In his final game, Delaney recorded 12 points, 3 assists, 1 rebound and 2 steals.

=== Guangdong Southern Tigers (2018–2019) ===
On July 28, 2018, Delaney signed with the Guangdong Southern Tigers of the Chinese Basketball Association (CBA). In his first game with the Southern Tigers, he recorded 19 points, 5 rebounds and 3 assists in a 87–84 win over the Beijing Ducks.

=== FC Barcelona (2019–2020) ===
On September 12, 2019, Delaney signed a one-year deal with an option for another season with Spanish EuroLeague powerhouse FC Barcelona. In his first game with FC Barcelona, Delaney racked up 8 points, 4 rebounds and 6 assists in a 92–86 win over the Obradoiro. He averaged 10.2 points and 3.7 assists per game. In May 2020, FC Barcelona released Delaney from his contract.

=== Olimpia Milano (2020–2022) ===
On June 2, 2020, Delaney signed a two-year contract with Olimpia Milano in Italy. On October 17, he was ruled out at least 20 days after suffering a left ankle sprain. On May 12, 2022, Delaney mutually parted ways with the Italian club, having already suffered a season-ending injury. Afterwards, he stated that the 2022 season would be his last season with any European basketball team or club.

== Career statistics ==
Legend
| GP | Games played | GS | Games started | MPG | Minutes per game |
| FG% | Field-goal percentage | 3P% | 3-point field-goal percentage | FT% | Free-throw percentage |
| RPG | Rebounds per game | APG | Assists per game | SPG | Steals per game |
| BPG | Blocks per game | PPG | Points per game | PIR | Performance index rating |
| **Bold** | Career high |

=== NBA ===
==== Regular season ====
| Year | Team | GP | GS | MPG | FG% | 3P% | FT% | RPG | APG | SPG | BPG | PPG |
|---|---|---|---|---|---|---|---|---|---|---|---|---|
| 2016–17 | Atlanta | **73** | 2 | 17.1 | .374 | .236 | **.806** | 1.7 | 2.6 | .5 | .0 | 5.4 |
| 2017–18 | Atlanta | 54 | **3** | **18.8** | **.382** | **.371** | .804 | **1.9** | **3.0** | **.6** | **.1** | **6.3** |
| Career | | 127 | 5 | 17.8 | .377 | .308 | .805 | 1.8 | 2.8 | .6 | .1 | 5.7 |

==== Playoffs ====
| Year | Team | GP | GS | MPG | FG% | 3P% | FT% | RPG | APG | SPG | BPG | PPG |
|---|---|---|---|---|---|---|---|---|---|---|---|---|
| 2017 | Atlanta | 1 | 0 | 3.0 | 1.000 | 1.000 | .500 | 1.0 | .0 | .0 | .0 | 8.0 |
| Career | | 1 | 0 | 3.0 | 1.000 | 1.000 | .500 | 1.0 | .0 | .0 | .0 | 8.0 |

=== EuroLeague ===
| Year | Team | GP | GS | MPG | FG% | 3P% | FT% | RPG | APG | SPG | BPG | PPG | PIR |
|---|---|---|---|---|---|---|---|---|---|---|---|---|---|
| 2013–14 | Bayern | 24 | 24 | 28.3 | .405 | .385 | .847 | **3.4** | 4.5 | **1.0** | **.1** | 13.9 | 17.4 |
| 2015–16 | Lokomotiv | 31* | **31*** | **33.3** | .427 | .402 | **.851** | **3.4** | **5.5** | .9 | .0 | **16.3** | **19.7** |
| 2019–20 | FC Barcelona | 26 | 6 | 22.5 | **.442** | **.430** | .683 | 2.2 | 4.8 | .7 | **.1** | 10.2 | 11.0 |
| 2020–21 | Milano | **32** | **31** | 24.9 | .405 | .388 | .814 | 2.6 | 3.5 | .9 | — | 11.6 | 11.5 |
| 2021–22 | Milano | 28 | 26 | 24.2 | .378 | .328 | .706 | 2.5 | 2.8 | .4 | — | 9.4 | 7.8 |
| Career | | 141 | 118 | 26.7 | .411 | .389 | .804 | 2.8 | 4.2 | .8 | .0 | 12.3 | 13.5 |

== See also ==
- 2010 NCAA Men's Basketball All-Americans
- List of NCAA Division I men's basketball career free throw scoring leaders
