= EuroCup Basketball Awards =

The EuroCup Basketball Awards are the awards given to the top individual performers of each season's edition of EuroCup Basketball, which is Europe's second-tier level continental-wide professional club basketball competition. The EuroCup is the league level that is one tier below the EuroLeague level.

== EuroCup awards ==
The awards are given out each season and include: the EuroCup Basketball MVP award, the EuroCup Basketball Finals MVP award, the EuroCup Basketball Regular Season MVP award, the EuroCup Basketball Rising Star award, the EuroCup Basketball Coach of the Year award, and the EuroCup Basketball All-EuroCup Team.

=== EuroCup Basketball MVP ===
The EuroCup Basketball MVP award began with the 2008–09 season.

Season	MVP	Team	Ref.
2008–09	(United States) Chuck Eidson	(Lithuania) Lietuvos Rytas	
2009–10	(Croatia) Marko Banić	(Spain) Bilbao	
2010–11	(United States) Dontaye Draper	(Croatia) Cedevita Zagreb	
2011–12	(United States) Patrick Beverley	(Russia) Spartak St. Petersburg	
2012–13	(Greece) Nick Calathes	(Russia) Lokomotiv Kuban	
2013–14	(United States) Andrew Goudelock	(Russia) UNICS Kazan	
2014–15	(Montenegro) Tyrese Rice	(Russia) Khimki	
2015–16	(United States) Errick McCollum	(Turkey) Galatasaray	
2016–17	(Russia) Alexey Shved	(Russia) Khimki	
2017–18	(United States) Scottie Wilbekin	(Turkey) Darüşşafaka	
2018–19	(United States) Luke Sikma	(Germany) Alba Berlin	
2019–20	Not awarded ^{1}		
2020–21	(United States) Jamar Smith	(Russia) UNICS Kazan	
2021–22	(France) Mouhammadou Jaiteh	(Italy) Virtus Segafredo Bologna	
2022–23	(United States) Jerian Grant	(Turkey) Türk Telekom	
2023–24	(North Macedonia) T. J. Shorts	(France) Paris Basketball	
2024–25	(United States) Jared Harper	(Israel) Hapoel Jerusalem	
2025–26	(United States) Jared Harper (x2)	(Israel) Hapoel Jerusalem	

^1 There was no awarding in the 2019–20, because the season was cancelled due to the coronavirus pandemic in Europe.

=== EuroCup Basketball Finals MVP ===
The EuroCup Basketball Finals MVP award began with the 2002–03 season.

Season	Finals MVP	Team	Ref.
2002–03	(Serbia and Montenegro) Dejan Tomašević	(Spain) Valencia	
2003–04	(United States) Kelly McCarty	(Israel) Hapoel Jerusalem	
2004–05	(Lithuania) Robertas Javtokas	(Lithuania) Lietuvos Rytas	
2005–06	(Panama) Ruben Douglas	(Russia) Dynamo Moscow	
2006–07	(United States) Charles Smith	(Spain) Real Madrid	
2007–08	(Spain) Rudy Fernández	(Spain) Joventut Badalona	
2008–09	(Lithuania) Marijonas Petravičius	(Lithuania) Lietuvos Rytas	
2009–10	(Australia) Matt Nielsen	(Spain) Valencia	
2010–11	(Croatia) Marko Popović	(Russia) UNICS Kazan	
2011–12	(Croatia) Zoran Planinić	(Russia) Khimki	
2012–13	(United States) Richard Hendrix	(Russia) Lokomotiv Kuban	
2013–14	(United States) Justin Doellman	(Spain) Valencia	
2014–15	(Montenegro) Tyrese Rice	(Russia) Khimki	
2015–16	(Gabon) Stéphane Lasme	(Turkey) Galatasaray Odeabank	
2016–17	(Spain) Alberto Díaz	(Spain) Unicaja	
2017–18	(United States) Scottie Wilbekin	(Turkey) Darüşşafaka	
2018–19	(Georgia (country)) Will Thomas	(Spain) Valencia Basket	
2019–20	Not awarded ^{1}		
2020–21	(United States) Rob Gray	(France) Monaco	
2021–22	(Serbia) Miloš Teodosić	(Italy) Virtus Segafredo Bologna	
2022–23	(United States) John Shurna	(Spain) Gran Canaria	
2023–24	(North Macedonia) T. J. Shorts	(France) Paris Basketball	
2024–25	(United States) Johnathan Motley	(Israel) Hapoel Tel Aviv	
2025–26	(France) Adam Mokoka	(France) Cosea JL Bourg	

^1 There was no awarding in the 2019–20, because the season was cancelled due to the coronavirus pandemic in Europe.

=== EuroCup Basketball Regular Season MVP ===
The EuroCup Basketball Regular Season MVP award began with the 2017–18 season.

Season	Regular season MVP	Team	Ref.
2017–18	(United States) Scottie Wilbekin	(Turkey) Darüşşafaka	
2018–19	(United States) Pierriá Henry	(Russia) UNICS Kazan	
2019–20	(Serbia) Miloš Teodosić	(Italy) Virtus Segafredo Bologna	
2020–21	(Serbia) Miloš Teodosić (2×)	(Italy) Virtus Segafredo Bologna	

=== EuroCup Basketball MVP of the Week ===
The EuroCup Basketball MVP of the Week award began with the 2002–03 season.

=== EuroCup Basketball Rising Star ===
The EuroCup Basketball Rising Star award began with the 2008–09 season.

Season	Rising Star	Team	Ref.
2008–09	(Serbia) Milan Mačvan	(Serbia) Hemofarm	
2009–10	(Spain) Víctor Claver	(Spain) Valencia	
2010–11	(Lithuania) Donatas Motiejūnas	(Italy) Treviso	
2011–12	(Lithuania) Jonas Valančiūnas	(Lithuania) Lietuvos Rytas	
2012–13	(Montenegro) Bojan Dubljević	(Spain) Valencia	
2013–14	(Montenegro) Bojan Dubljević (2)	(Spain) Valencia	
2014–15	(Latvia) Kristaps Porziņģis	(Spain) Sevilla	
2015–16	(Poland) Mateusz Ponitka	(Poland) Zielona Góra	
2016–17	(Latvia) Rolands Šmits	(Spain) Montakit Fuenlabrada	
2017–18	(Bosnia and Herzegovina) Džanan Musa	(Croatia) Cedevita	
2018–19	(Lithuania) Martynas Echodas	(Lithuania) Rytas Vilnius	
2019–20	Not awarded ^{1}		
2020–21	(Poland) Aleksander Balcerowski	(Spain) Herbalife Gran Canaria	
2021–22	(Senegal) Khalifa Diop	(Spain) Herbalife Gran Canaria	
2022–23	(Poland) Aleksander Balcerowski (2)	(Spain) Herbalife Gran Canaria	
2023–24	(France) Zaccharie Risacher	(French Federation of Basketball) JL Bourg	
2024–25	(Dominican Republic) Jean Montero	(Spanish Basketball Federation) Valencia Basket	
2025–26	(Denmark) Tobias Jensen	(German Basketball Federation) ratiopharm Ulm	

^1 There was no awarding in the 2019–20, because the season was cancelled due to the coronavirus pandemic in Europe.

=== EuroCup Basketball Coach of the Year ===
The EuroCup Basketball Coach of the Year award began with the 2008–09 season.

Season	Coach of the Year	Team	Ref.
2008–09	(Turkey) Oktay Mahmuti	(Italy) Treviso	
2009–10	(Greece) Ilias Zouros	(Greece) Panellinios	
2010–11	(Croatia) Aleksandar Petrović	(Croatia) Cedevita Zagreb	
2011–12	(Slovenia) Jure Zdovc	(Russia) Spartak St. Petersburg	
2012–13	(Greece) Fotios Katsikaris	(Spain) Bilbao	
2013–14	(Italy) Andrea Trinchieri	(Russia) UNICS Kazan	
2014–15	(Spain) Aíto García Reneses	(Spain) Gran Canaria	
2015–16	(Italy) Maurizio Buscaglia	(Italy) Aquila Trento	
2016–17	(Spain) Pedro Martínez	(Spain) Valencia	
2017–18	(Serbia) Saša Obradović	(Russia) Lokomotiv Kuban	
2018–19	(Spain) Aíto García Reneses (2)	(Germany) Alba Berlin	
2019–20	Not awarded ^{1}		
2020–21	(Montenegro) Zvezdan Mitrović	(France) Monaco	
2021–22	(Serbia) Dušan Alimpijević	(Turkey) Frutti Extra Bursaspor	
2022–23	(Turkey) Erdem Can	(Turkey) Türk Telekom	
2023–24	(Finland) Tuomas Iisalo	(France) Paris	
2024–25	(Spain) Pedro Martínez (2)	(Spain) Valencia	
2025–26	(Serbia) Dušan Alimpijević (2)	(Turkey) Beşiktaş Gain	

^1 There was no awarding in the 2019–20, because the season was cancelled due to the coronavirus pandemic in Europe.

=== EuroCup Basketball All-EuroCup Team ===
The EuroCup Basketball All-EuroCup Team awards began with the 2008–09 season.

== See also ==
- EuroLeague Awards (top-tier level)
- Basketball Champions League Awards (third-tier level)
