= EuroCup Basketball MVP =

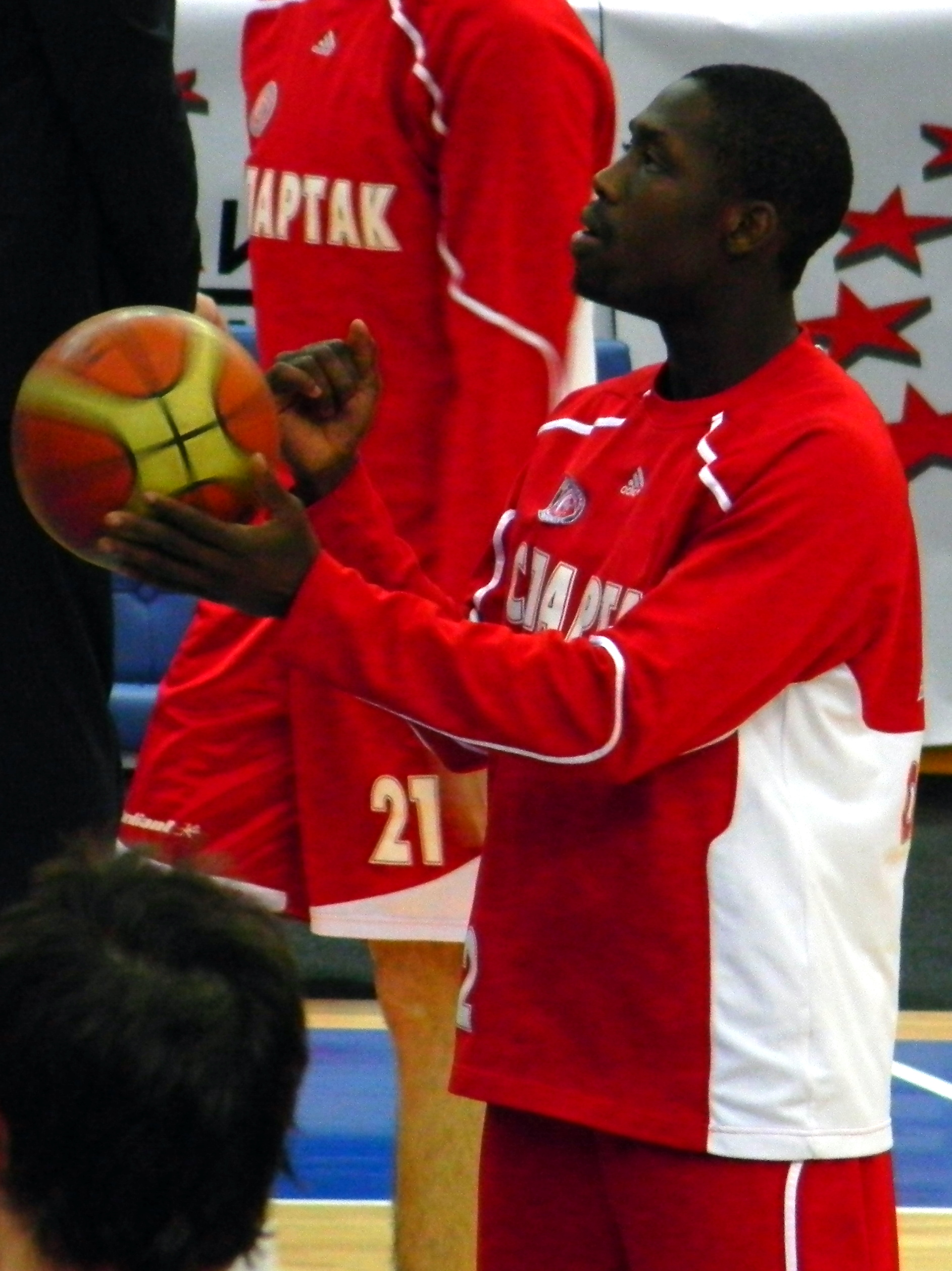
Patrick Beverley was the EuroCup MVP in 2012.

The EuroCup Basketball MVP is the yearly MVP award that is awarded by the 2nd-tier level professional basketball league in Europe, the EuroCup Basketball League, which is the pan-European professional basketball league that is one tier level below the top-tier EuroLeague.

The EuroCup Basketball MVP award began with the EuroCup Basketball 2008–09 season.

== Selection criteria ==
The EuroCup Basketball MVP was originally selected solely by a panel of the league's basketball experts, from the 2008–09 season, through the 2015–16 season. Starting with the 2016–17 season, online fan voting was added to the award's selection process.

== EuroCup Basketball MVP award winners ==
Player (X)	Denotes the number of times the player was named MVP.

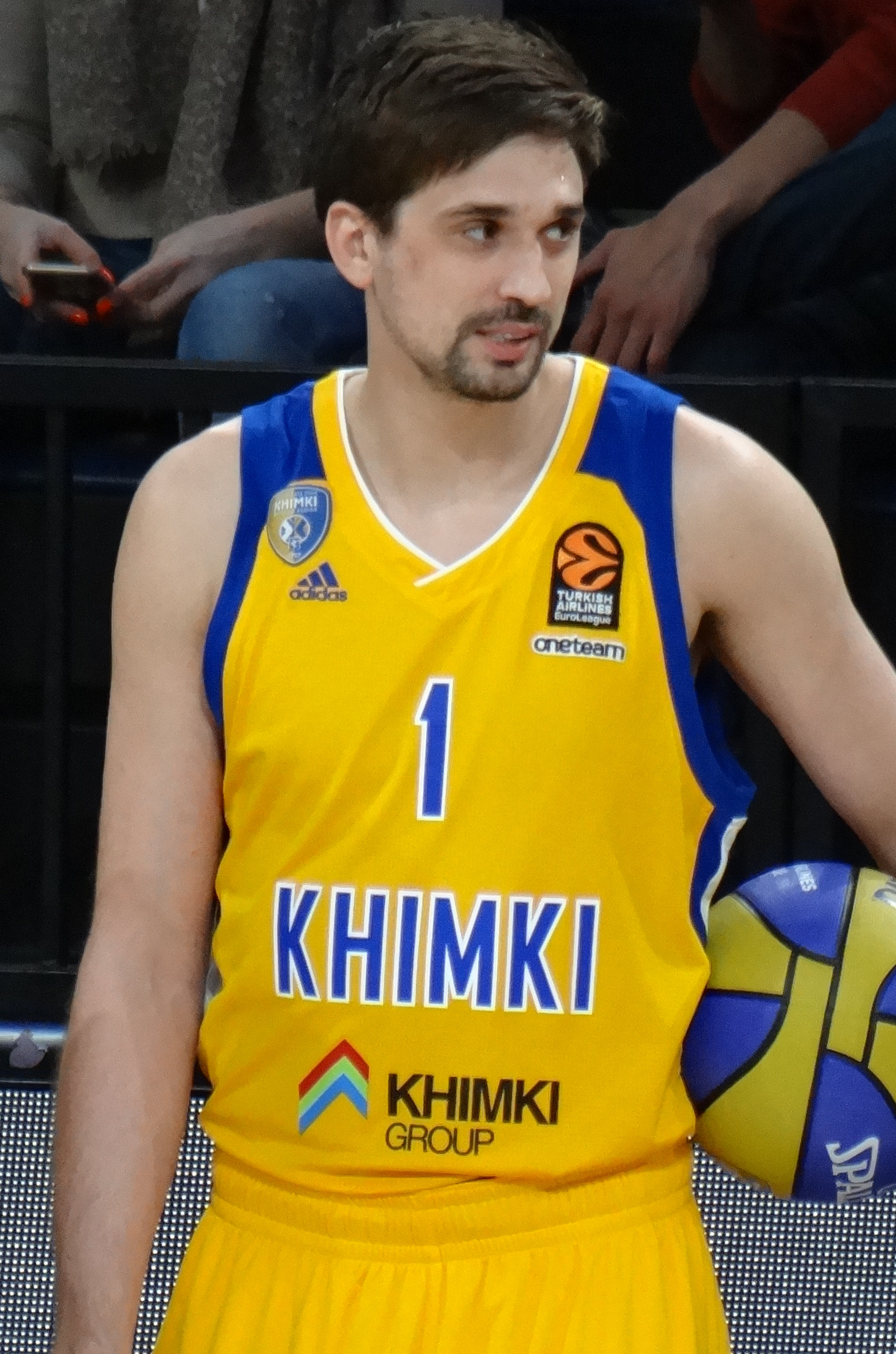
Alexey Shved was the EuroCup MVP in 2017.

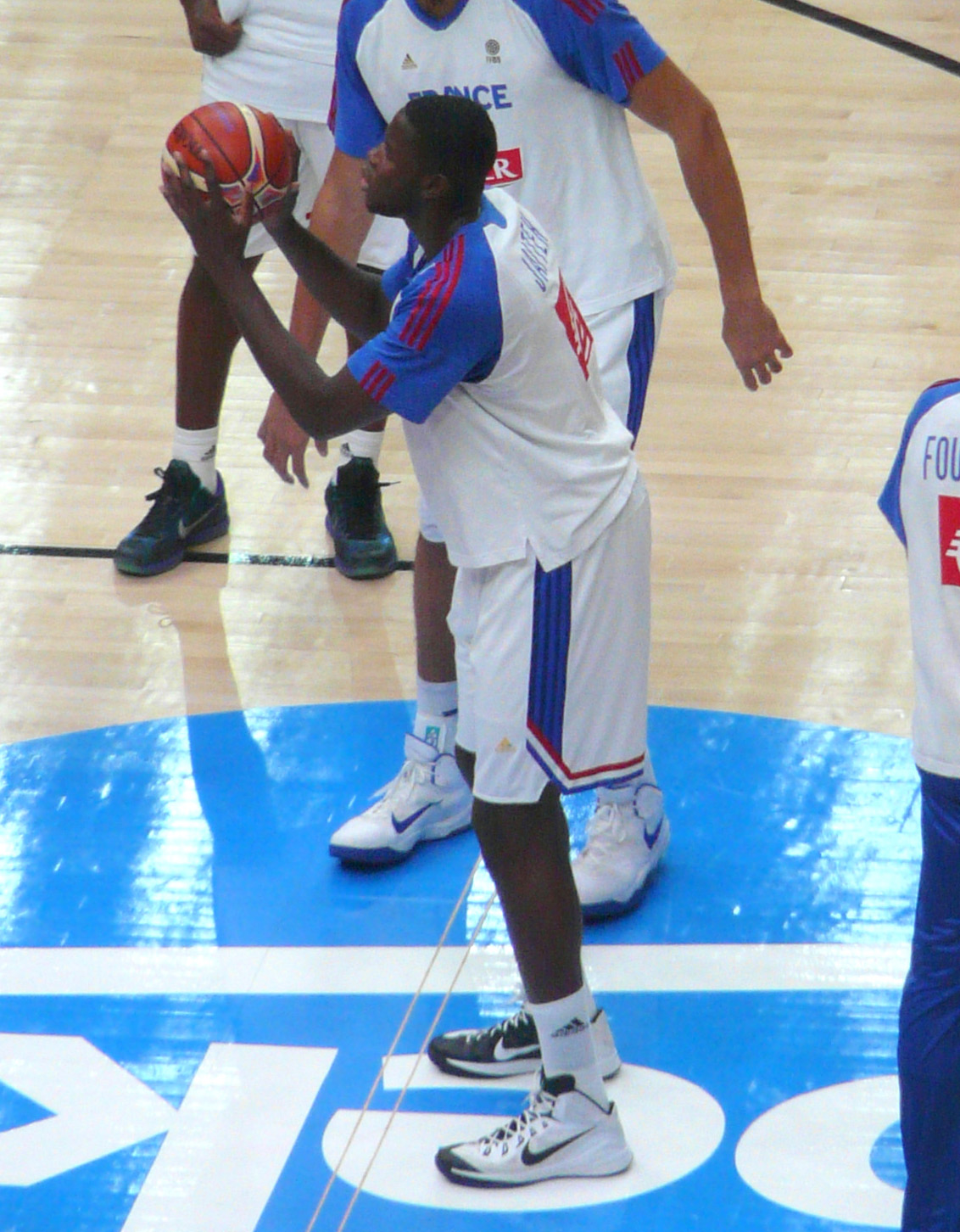
Mouhammadou Jaiteh was the EuroCup MVP in 2022.

Season	MVP	Team	Ref.
2008–09	(United States) Chuck Eidson	(Lithuania) Lietuvos Rytas	
2009–10	(Croatia) Marko Banić	(Spain) Bilbao	
2010–11	(Croatia) Dontaye Draper	(Croatia) Cedevita Zagreb	
2011–12	(United States) Patrick Beverley	(Russia) Spartak St. Petersburg	
2012–13	(Greece) Nick Calathes	(Russia) Lokomotiv Kuban	
2013–14	(United States) Drew Goudelock	(Russia) UNICS Kazan	
2014–15	(Montenegro) Tyrese Rice	(Russia) Khimki	
2015–16	(United States) Errick McCollum	(Turkey) Galatasaray	
2016–17	(Russia) Alexey Shved	(Russia) Khimki	
2017–18	(Turkey) Scottie Wilbekin	(Turkey) Darüşşafaka	
2018–19	(United States) Luke Sikma	(Germany) Alba Berlin	
2019–20	Not awarded ^{1}		
2020–21	(United States) Jamar Smith	(Russia) UNICS Kazan	
2021–22	(France) Mouhammadou Jaiteh	(Italy) Virtus Segafredo Bologna	
2022–23	(United States) Jerian Grant	(Turkey) Türk Telekom	
2023–24	(North Macedonia) T. J. Shorts	(France) Paris Basketball	
2024–25	(United States) Jared Harper	(Israel) Hapoel Jerusalem	
2025–26	(United States) Jared Harper (x2)	(Israel) Hapoel Jerusalem	

^1 There was no awarding in the 2019–20, because the season was cancelled due to the coronavirus pandemic in Europe.

== See also ==
- EuroCup awards
- EuroCup Finals MVP
- EuroLeague
- EuroLeague Awards
- EuroLeague MVP
- EuroLeague Final Four MVP
