= EuroCup Basketball Finals MVP =

Annual basketball club competition

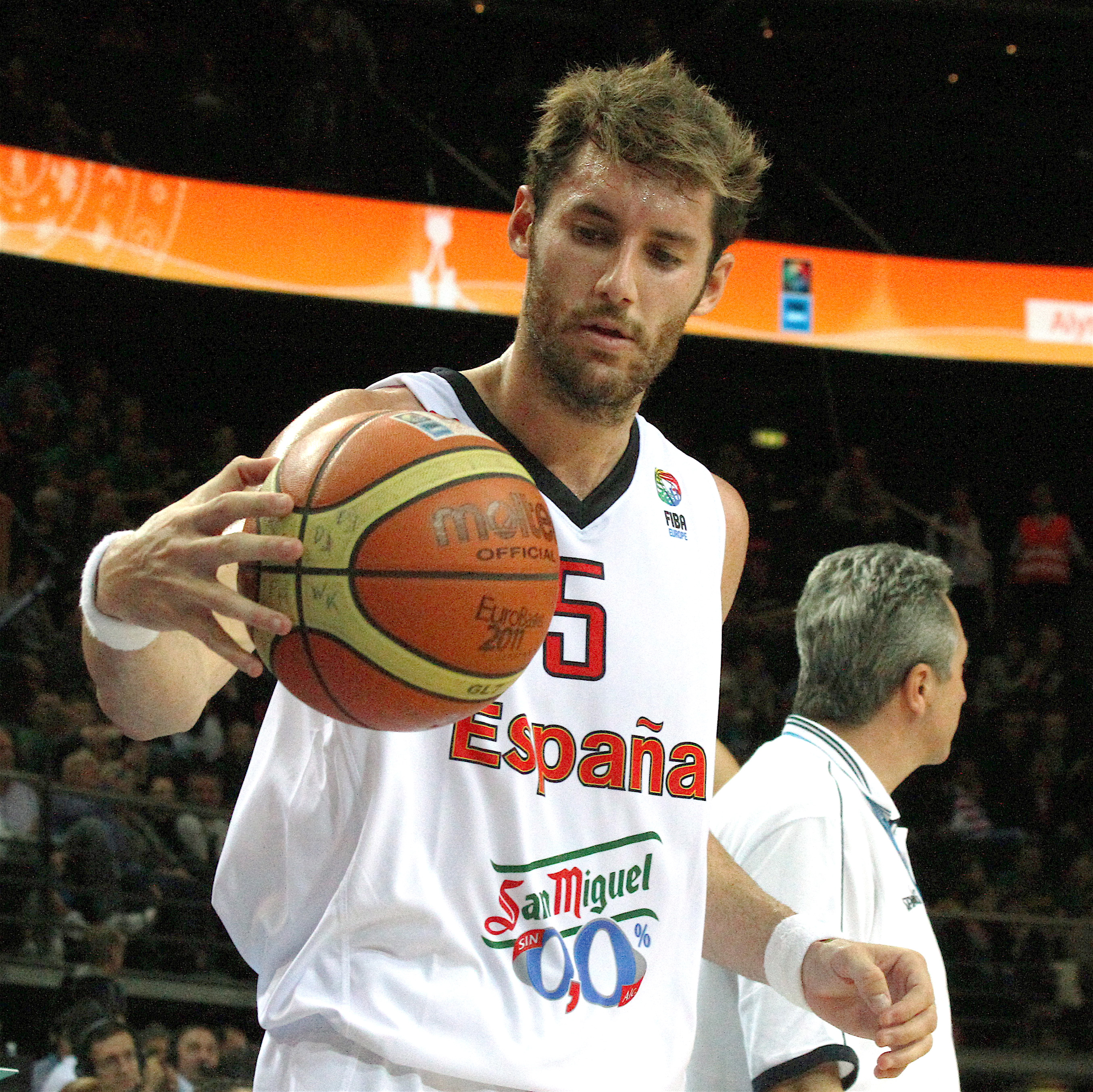
Rudy Fernández was the EuroCup Finals MVP in 2008.

The EuroCup Basketball Finals MVP, previously also known as the ULEB Cup Finals MVP and the ULEB Eurocup Finals MVP, is the yearly MVP award of the finals of the 2nd-tier level professional basketball league in Europe, the EuroCup Basketball League. The EuroCup Basketball League is the European-wide professional basketball league that is one tier level below the top-tier EuroLeague.

The EuroCup Basketball Finals MVP award began with the EuroCup Basketball 2002–03 season. Dejan Tomašević was the first winner of the award.

== EuroCup Basketball Finals MVP award winners ==
- Player nationality by national team.

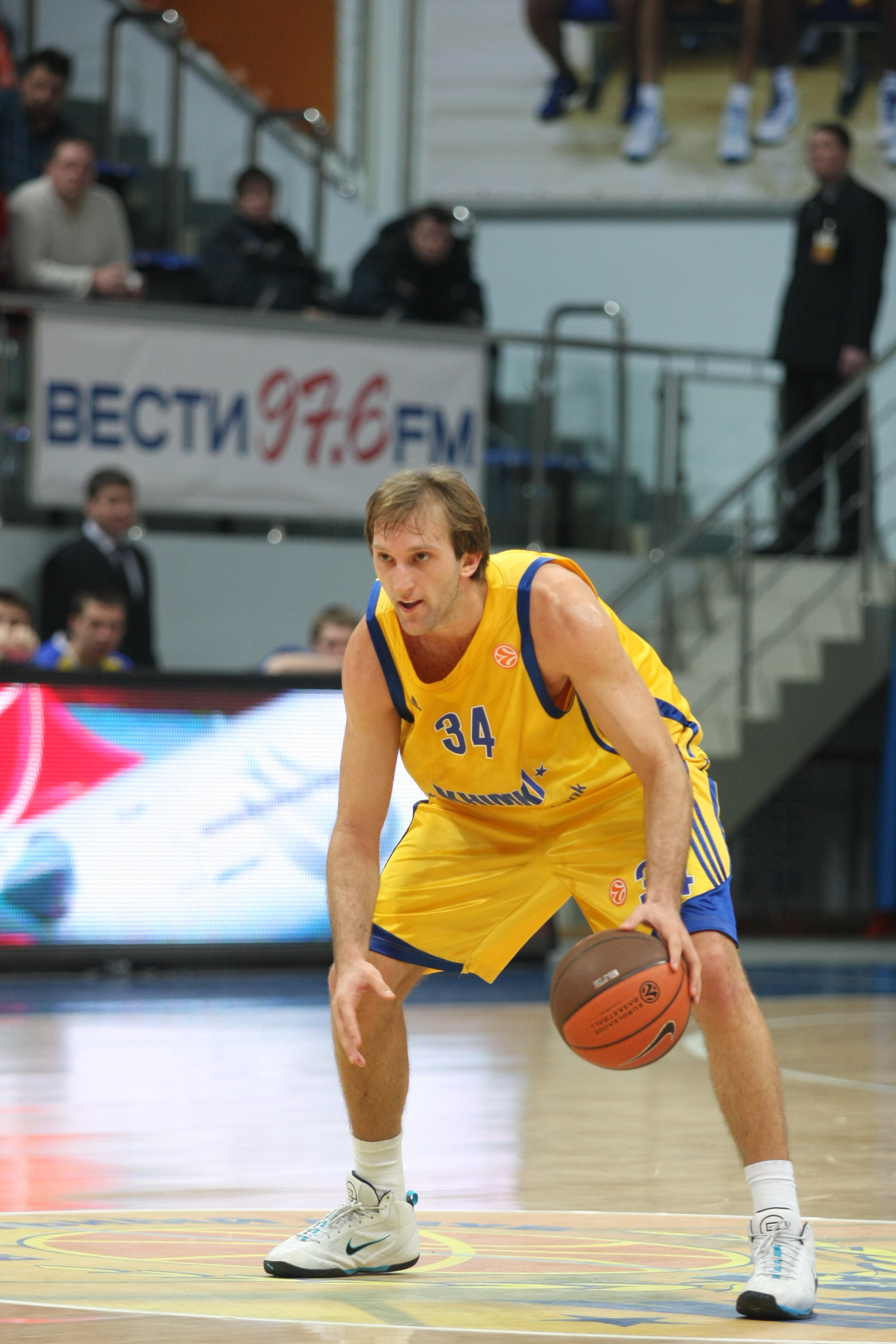
Zoran Planinić was the EuroCup Finals MVP in 2012.

Player (X)	Denotes the number of times the player was named Finals MVP.

Season	Finals MVP	Team	Ref.
2002–03	(Serbia and Montenegro) Dejan Tomašević	(Spain) Valencia	
2003–04	(Russia) Kelly McCarty	(Israel) Hapoel Jerusalem	
2004–05	(Lithuania) Robertas Javtokas	(Lithuania) Lietuvos Rytas	
2005–06	(Panama) Ruben Douglas	(Russia) Dynamo Moscow	
2006–07	(United States) Charles Smith	(Spain) Real Madrid	
2007–08	(Spain) Rudy Fernández	(Spain) Joventut Badalona	
2008–09	(Lithuania) Marijonas Petravičius	(Lithuania) Lietuvos Rytas	
2009–10	(Australia) Matt Nielsen	(Spain) Valencia	
2010–11	(Croatia) Marko Popović	(Russia) UNICS Kazan	
2011–12	(Croatia) Zoran Planinić	(Russia) Khimki	
2012–13	(North Macedonia) Richard Hendrix	(Russia) Lokomotiv Kuban	
2013–14	(Kosovo) Justin Doellman	(Spain) Valencia	
2014–15	(Montenegro) Tyrese Rice	(Russia) Khimki	
2015–16	(Gabon) Stéphane Lasme	(Turkey) Galatasaray Odeabank	
2016–17	(Spain) Alberto Díaz	(Spain) Unicaja	
2017–18	(United States) Scottie Wilbekin	(Turkey) Darüşşafaka	
2018–19	(Georgia (country)) Will Thomas	(Spain) Valencia	
2019–20	Not awarded ^{1}		
2020–21	(United States) Rob Gray	(France) Monaco	
2021–22	(Serbia) Miloš Teodosić	(Italy) Virtus Segafredo Bologna	
2022–23	(United States) John Shurna	(Spain) Gran Canaria	
2023–24	(North Macedonia) T. J. Shorts	(France) Paris Basketball	
2024–25	(United States) Johnathan Motley	(Israel) Hapoel Tel Aviv	
2025–26	(France) Adam Mokoka	(France) Cosea JL Bourg	

^1 There was no awarding in the 2019–20, because the season was cancelled due to the coronavirus pandemic in Europe.

== See also ==
- EuroCup awards
- EuroCup MVP
- EuroLeague Awards
- EuroLeague MVP
- EuroLeague Final Four MVP
