= 2020–21 EuroCup Basketball =

2020–21 7DAYS EuroCup^{1}
- Season: 2020–21
- Dates: 29 September 2020 – 30 April 2021
- Games played: 182
- Teams: 24

Regular season
- Season MVP: (United States) Jamar Smith

Finals
- Champions: (France) AS Monaco (1st title)
- Runners-up: (Russia) UNICS
- Semi-finalists: (Spain) Herbalife Gran Canaria (Italy) Virtus Segafredo Bologna
- Finals MVP: (United States) Rob Gray

Awards
- Rising Star: (Poland) Aleksander Balcerowski

Records
- Biggest home win: Bahçeşehir 108–74 Reyer Venezia (15 December 2020)
- Biggest away win: Promitheas 69–105 Cedevita Olimpija (16 December 2020)
- Highest scoring: Giants Antwerp 94–114 Lokomotiv (4 November 2020)
- Winning streak: 19 games Virtus Segafredo Bologna
- All statistics correct as of 30 April 2021.^{1} Sponsored name, referring to 7DAYS.

The 2020–21 EuroCup Basketball season was the 19th season of Euroleague Basketball's secondary level professional club basketball tournament. It was the 13th season since it was renamed from the ULEB Cup to the EuroCup, and the fifth season under the title sponsorship name of 7DAYS.

== Team allocation ==
A total of 24 teams from 10 leagues participated in the 2020–21 season of the EuroCup Basketball. In response to the premature end of the previous season caused by the COVID-19 pandemic, the eight teams that qualified for the quarterfinals were awarded with guaranteed spots. The remaining spots were awarded to teams qualifying through their domestic league's final standings. On 15 June 2020, the preliminary team list for the season was approved. On 22 June 2020, the team list was approved by the ECA shareholders executive board, selecting Dolomiti Energia Trento to replace Fraport Skyliners who had withdrawn from the competition. On 17 September 2020, Mornar Bar replaced Maccabi Rishon LeZion which was forced to withdraw due to logistical difficulties and financial concerns complicated by the COVID-19 pandemic.

=== Teams ===
The labels in the parentheses show how each team qualified for the place of its starting round:

- EC: EuroCup quarterfinalists
- 1st, 2nd, 3rd, 4th, etc.: League positions
- Abd-: League positions of abandoned season due to the COVID-19 pandemic as determined by the leagues

Qualified teams for 2020–21 EuroCup Basketball (by entry round)
Regular season
(France) AS Monaco (EC)	(Italy) Germani Brescia (Abd-3rd)	(Serbia) Partizan NIS (EC)	(Turkey) Frutti Extra Bursaspor (Abd-9th)
(France) Metropolitans 92 (Abd-4th)	(Italy) Dolomiti Energia Trento (Abd-9th)	(Montenegro) Budućnost VOLI (Abd-2nd)	(Turkey) Bahçeşehir Koleji (Abd-13th)
(France) JL Bourg (Abd-5th)	(Spain) Unicaja (EC)	(Slovenia) Cedevita Olimpija (Abd-4th)	(Belgium) Telenet Giants Antwerp (Abd-3rd)
(France) Nanterre 92 (Abd-7th)	(Spain) MoraBanc Andorra (9th)	(Montenegro) Mornar (Abd-5th)	(Germany) ratiopharm Ulm (3rd)
(Italy) Virtus Segafredo Bologna (EC)	(Spain) Herbalife Gran Canaria (11th)	(Russia) UNICS (EC)	(Greece) Promitheas (EC)
(Italy) Umana Reyer Venezia (EC)	(Spain) Joventut (12th)	(Russia) Lokomotiv Kuban (Abd-3rd)	(Lithuania) Lietkabelis (Abd-3rd)

Notes

1. ABA League (ABA): Budućnost VOLI, Cedevita Olimpija and Mornar qualified through the ABA League.
2. France (FRA): AS Monaco is a club based in Monaco (which does not qualify for European competitions), but participate in European competitions through one of the berths for France (any coefficient points it earns count toward France).
3. Spain (ESP): MoraBanc Andorra is a club based in Andorra (which does not qualify for European competitions), but participate in European competitions through one of the berths for Spain (any coefficient points it earns count toward Spain).

== Referees ==
A total of 70 Euroleague Basketball referees set to work on the 2020–21 season:

Referees of the 2020–21 season
(Spain) Jordi Aliaga; (Ukraine) Mykola Ambrosov; (Israel) Amit Balak; (Germany) Benjamin Barth; (Latvia) Ingus Baumanis; (Serbia) Ilija Belošević; (France) Joseph Bissang; (Slovenia) Matej Boltauzer; (Turkey) Huseyin Celik; (Greece) Christos Christodoulou; (Albania) Gentian Cici; (Switzerland) Sébastien Clivaz; (Spain) Carlos Cortés; (France) Mehdi Difallah; (Montenegro) Igor Dragojević; (Greece) Ioannis Foufis; (Spain) Juan Carlos García González; (Greece) Spiros Gkontas; (Croatia) Denis Hadžić; (Estonia) Aare Halliko; (Spain) Daniel Hierrezuelo; (Croatia) Tomislav Hordov; (Turkey) Sinan İşgüder; (Slovenia) Damir Javor	(Spain) Benjamín Jiménez; (Serbia) Milivoje Jovčić; (Serbia) Marko Juras; (Croatia) Luka Kardum; (Montenegro) Miloš Koljenšić; (Latvia) Kristaps Konstantinovs; (Greece) Elias Koromilas; (Poland) Marcin Kowalski; (Italy) Luigi Lamonica; (Latvia) Oļegs Latiševs; (Lithuania) Jurgis Laurinavičius; (Russia) Artem Lavrukhin; (Germany) Robert Lottermoser; (Slovenia) Mario Majkić; (Finland) Petri Mäntylä; (Turkey) Emin Moğulkoç; (Slovenia) Milan Nedović; (Serbia) Uroš Nikolić; (Serbia) Uroš Obrknežević; (Germany) Anne Panther; (Poland) Piotr Pastusiak; (Italy) Carmelo Paternicò; (Estonia) Rain Peerandi	(Spain) Miguel Ángel Pérez Pérez; (Spain) Emilio Pérez Pizarro; (Spain) Carlos Peruga; (Slovenia) Sašo Petek; (Slovenia) Saša Pukl; (Sweden) Saulius Racys; (Croatia) Josip Radojković; (Croatia) Sreten Radović; (Portugal) Fernando Rocha; (Italy) Michele Rossi; (Ukraine) Borys Ryzhyk; (Israel) Seffi Shemmesh; (Portugal) Sérgio Silva; (Lithuania) Artūras Šukys; (France) Hugues Thépénier; (Poland) Tomasz Trawicki; (Greece) Vasiliki Tsaroucha; (United Kingdom) Eduard Udyanskyy; (Russia) Stanislav Valeev; (Belgium) Nick Van den Broeck; (Lithuania) Gytis Vilius; (Czech Republic) Robert Vyklický; (Poland) Jakub Zamojski

== Round and draw dates ==
The schedule of the competition is as follows. On November 16, 2021, EuroCup Board adapt the competition calendar to the disruption caused by the COVID-19 pandemic. The Board agreed to delay the start of the Top 16 phase of the competition, which was set to start on December 30, 2020, with the new start date being set for January 13, 2021. The calendar modification provided an extended window for any remaining rescheduled games to be played ahead of the following phase, reducing risk of games being cancelled. Additionally, the deadlines to play any remaining rescheduled games ahead of the regular season and Top 16 were set on January 5, 2021 and March 16, 2021 respectively.

Schedule for 2020–21 EuroCup Basketball
Phase	Round	Draw date	First leg	Second leg	Third leg
Regular season	Round 1	10 July 2020	30 September 2020		
Regular season	Round 2	10 July 2020	7 October 2020		
Regular season	Round 3	10 July 2020	14 October 2020		
Regular season	Round 4	10 July 2020	21 October 2020		
Regular season	Round 5	10 July 2020	28 October 2020		
Regular season	Round 6	10 July 2020	4 November 2020		
Regular season	Round 7	10 July 2020	11 November 2020		
Regular season	Round 8	10 July 2020	18 November 2020		
Regular season	Round 9	10 July 2020	9 December 2020		
Regular season	Round 10	10 July 2020	16 December 2020		
Top 16	Round 1	10 July 2020	13 January 2021		
Top 16	Round 2	10 July 2020	20 January 2021		
Top 16	Round 3	10 July 2020	27 January 2021		
Top 16	Round 4	10 July 2020	3 February 2021		
Top 16	Round 5	10 July 2020	3 March 2021		
Top 16	Round 6	10 July 2020	10 March 2021		
Playoffs	Quarterfinals	10 July 2020	23 March 2021	26 March 2021	31 March 2021
Playoffs	Semifinals	10 July 2020	6 April 2021	9 April 2021	14 April 2021
Playoffs	Finals	10 July 2020	27 April 2021	30 April 2021	5 May 2021

The original schedule of the competition, as planned before the adjustments caused by the pandemic, was as follows.

Original schedule for 2020–21 EuroCup Basketball
Phase	Round	Draw date	First leg	Second leg	Third leg
Regular season	Round 1	10 July 2020	30 September 2020		
Regular season	Round 2	10 July 2020	7 October 2020		
Regular season	Round 3	10 July 2020	14 October 2020		
Regular season	Round 4	10 July 2020	21 October 2020		
Regular season	Round 5	10 July 2020	28 October 2020		
Regular season	Round 6	10 July 2020	4 November 2020		
Regular season	Round 7	10 July 2020	11 November 2020		
Regular season	Round 8	10 July 2020	18 November 2020		
Regular season	Round 9	10 July 2020	9 December 2020		
Regular season	Round 10	10 July 2020	16 December 2020		
Top 16	Round 1	10 July 2020	30 December 2020		
Top 16	Round 2	10 July 2020	6 January 2021		
Top 16	Round 3	10 July 2020	13 January 2021		
Top 16	Round 4	10 July 2020	20 January 2021		
Top 16	Round 5	10 July 2020	27 January 2021		
Top 16	Round 6	10 July 2020	3 February 2021		
Playoffs	Quarterfinals	10 July 2020	2 March 2021	5 March 2021	10 March 2021
Playoffs	Semifinals	10 July 2020	16 March 2021	19 March 2021	24 March 2021
Playoffs	Finals	10 July 2020	6 April 2021	9 April 2021	14 April 2021

=== Draw ===
The draw was held on 10 July 2020 in Barcelona, Spain. Media and clubs representatives were allowed to attend the draw due to COVID-19 pandemic restrictions.

The 24 teams were drawn into four groups of six, with the restriction that teams from the same league could not be drawn against each other. For the draw, the teams were seeded into six pots, in accordance with the Club Ranking, based on their performance in European competitions during a three-year period and the lowest possible position that any club from that league could occupy in the draw was calculated by adding the results of the worst performing team from each league.

Pot 1
Team	Pts
(Greece) Promitheas	135^{†}
(Spain) Unicaja	111
(Russia) UNICS	106
(Russia) Lokomotiv Kuban	99

Pot 4
Team	Pts
(Slovenia) Cedevita Olimpija	60
(Italy) Virtus Segafredo Bologna	58^{†}
(Italy) Umana Reyer Venezia	58^{†}
(Italy) Germani Brescia	58^{†}

Pot 2
Team	Pts
(Montenegro) Budućnost VOLI	82
(Spain) MoraBanc Andorra	78
(Spain) Herbalife Gran Canaria	73^{†}
(Spain) Joventut Badalona	73^{†}

Pot 5
Team	Pts
(France) AS Monaco	57
(Turkey) Frutti Extra Bursaspor	53^{†}
(Turkey) Bahçeşehir Koleji	53^{†}
(Germany) ratiopharm Ulm	49

Pot 3
Team	Pts
(Israel) Maccabi Rishon LeZion	70^{†}
(Lithuania) Lietkabelis	69^{†}
(Serbia) Partizan NIS	67
(Italy) Dolomiti Energia Trento	62

Pot 6
Team	Pts
(France) Nanterre 92	47^{†}
(France) Metropolitans 92	47^{†}
(France) JL Bourg	47^{†}
(Belgium) Telenet Giants Antwerp	0

Notes

^† Indicates teams with points applying the minimum for the league they play.

The fixtures were decided after the draw, using a computer draw not shown to public, with the following match sequence:

Note: Positions for scheduling do not use the seeding pots, e.g., Team 1 is not necessarily the team from Pot 1 in the draw.

Round	Matches
Round 1	6 v 3, 4 v 2, 5 v 1
Round 2	1 v 6, 2 v 5, 3 v 4
Round 3	6 v 4, 5 v 3, 1 v 2
Round 4	6 v 2, 3 v 1, 4 v 5
Round 5	5 v 6, 1 v 4, 2 v 3

Round	Matches
Round 6	1 v 5, 2 v 4, 3 v 6
Round 7	4 v 3, 5 v 2, 6 v 1
Round 8	2 v 1, 3 v 5, 4 v 6
Round 9	5 v 4, 1 v 3, 2 v 6
Round 10	3 v 2, 4 v 1, 6 v 5

There were scheduling restrictions: for example, teams from the same city in general were not scheduled to play at home in the same round (to avoid them playing at home on the same day or on consecutive days, due to logistics and crowd control).

== Regular season ==
Location of teams of the 2020-21 EuroCup regular season.
Red: Group A; Green: Group B; Blue: Group C; Yellow: Group D.

In each group, teams played against each other home-and-away in a round-robin format. The group winners, runners-up, third-placed teams and fourth-placed teams advanced to the Top 16, while the fifth-placed teams and sixth-placed teams were eliminated.

=== Group A ===
Pos	Team	Pld	W	L	PF	PA	PD	Qualification	CJB	UNK	JLB	PAR	BSK	URV
1	(Spain) Joventut	10	8	2	849	783	+66	Advance to Top 16	—	84–77	90–75	85–82	77–88	92–78
2	(Russia) UNICS	10	6	4	827	797	+30	Advance to Top 16	91–93	—	76–71	93–70	89–88	90–87
3	(France) JL Bourg	10	6	4	810	777	+33	Advance to Top 16	77–84	74–86	—	73–71	79–77	87–59 (Note: The rescheduled game was played in Venice instead of Bourg-en-Bresse by agreement between both teams.)
4	(Serbia) Partizan NIS	10	6	4	810	784	+26	Advance to Top 16	78–75	89–86	76–89	—	88–75	95–73
5	(Turkey) Bahçeşehir Koleji	10	2	8	810	827	−17		72–91	67–70	82–99	76–82	—	108–74
6	(Italy) Umana Reyer Venezia	10	2	8	744	882	−138		75–89	85–78	76–86	59–79	88–82	—

Source: EuroCup Basketball
Legend: Blue = home team win; Red = away team win.
Rules for classification: All points scored in extra period(s) were not counted in the standings, nor for any tie-break situation.

=== Group B ===
Pos	Team	Pld	W	L	PF	PA	PD	Qualification	MET	UNI	MOR	BUD	ULM	BRE
1	(France) Metropolitans 92	10	7	3	809	786	+23	Advance to Top 16	—	90–80	78–65	83–89	72–65	86–81
2	(Spain) Unicaja	10	7	3	875	811	+64	Advance to Top 16	96–88	—	98–72	91–87	90–94	86–69
3	(Montenegro) Mornar	10	5	5	788	807	−19	Advance to Top 16	89–78	90–80	—	85–82	66–82	95–76
4	(Montenegro) Budućnost VOLI	10	5	5	785	785	0	Advance to Top 16	71–73	66–90	78–84	—	73–68	93–81
5	(Germany) ratiopharm Ulm	10	4	6	786	773	+13		80–86	76–81	84–76	73–77	—	88–76
6	(Italy) Germani Brescia	10	2	8	751	832	−81		70–75	79–83	77–75	66–75	87–84	—

Source: EuroCup Basketball
Legend: Blue = home team win; Red = away team win.
Rules for classification: All points scored in extra period(s) were not counted in the standings, nor for any tie-break situation.

=== Group C ===
Pos	Team	Pld	W	L	PF	PA	PD	Qualification	VIR	LOK	ASM	MBA	LIE	ANT
1	(Italy) Virtus Segafredo Bologna	10	10	0	861	745	+116	Advance to Top 16	—	85–79	94–85	92–81	82–73	92–73
2	(Russia) Lokomotiv Kuban	10	8	2	910	811	+99	Advance to Top 16	83–89	—	76–72	76–61	94–90	89–72
3	(France) AS Monaco	10	6	4	786	724	+62	Advance to Top 16	68–74	72–88	—	66–64	82–57	96–64
4	(Spain) MoraBanc Andorra	10	3	7	746	776	−30	Advance to Top 16	66–82	100–106	76–82	—	76–66	82–69
5	(Lithuania) Lietkabelis	10	2	8	721	831	−110		61–76	76–105	64–88	77–69	—	80–73
6	(Belgium) Telenet Giants Antwerp	10	1	9	734	871	−137		76–95	94–114	67–75	60–71	86–77	—

Source: EuroCup Basketball
Legend: Blue = home team win; Red = away team win.
Rules for classification: All points scored in extra period(s) were not counted in the standings, nor for any tie-break situation.

=== Group D ===
Pos	Team	Pld	W	L	PF	PA	PD	Qualification	HGC	COL	TRE	NTR	BUR	PRO
1	(Spain) Herbalife Gran Canaria	10	8	2	831	765	+66	Advance to Top 16	—	90–82	71–61	94–82	89–76	98–83
2	(Slovenia) Cedevita Olimpija	10	7	3	838	737	+101	Advance to Top 16	84–68	—	87–65	75–63	104–88 (Note: The match, scheduled to be played on 7 October, was not played, and Cedevita Olimpija forfeited 0–20. But the decision was overturned. The rescheduled game was played in Bursa instead of Ljubljana by agreement between both teams.)	77–73
3	(Italy) Dolomiti Energia Trento	10	6	4	738	713	+25	Advance to Top 16	56–67	61–51	—	102–104	89–80	78–51
4	(France) Nanterre 92	10	4	6	791	806	−15	Advance to Top 16	90–74	80–76	65–71	—	90–91 (Note: The rescheduled game was played in Bursa instead of Nanterre by agreement between both teams.)	91–70
5	(Turkey) Frutti Extra Bursaspor	10	3	7	853	907	−54		76–94	80–97	86–93	102–92	—	84–93
6	(Greece) Promitheas	10	2	8	757	880	−123		75–86	69–105	80–89	88–72	75–100	—

Source: EuroCup Basketball
Legend: Blue = home team win; Red = away team win.
Rules for classification: All points scored in extra period(s) were not counted in the standings, nor for any tie-break situation.

== Top 16 ==
In each group, teams played against each other in a home-and-away round-robin format. The group winners and runners-up advanced to the playoffs, while the third-placed teams and fourth-placed teams were eliminated.

=== Group E ===
Pos	Team	Pld	W	L	PF	PA	PD	Qualification	ASM	CJB	NTR	UNI
1	(France) AS Monaco	6	5	1	548	480	+68	Advance to quarterfinals	—	97–82	98–94	90–71
2	(Spain) Joventut	6	4	2	523	523	0	Advance to quarterfinals	79–72	—	95–90	77–90
3	(France) Nanterre 92	6	2	4	509	538	−29		65–93	88–95	—	80–74
4	(Spain) Unicaja	6	1	5	493	532	−39		89–98	86–95	83–92	—

Source: EuroCup Basketball
Legend: Blue = home team win; Red = away team win.
Rules for classification: All points scored in extra period(s) were not counted in the standings, nor for any tie-break situation.

=== Group F ===
Pos	Team	Pld	W	L	PF	PA	PD	Qualification	MET	LOK	TRE	PAR
1	(France) Metropolitans 92	6	4	2	435	441	−6	Advance to quarterfinals	—	61–83	92–86	79–62
2	(Russia) Lokomotiv Kuban	6	3	3	489	464	+25	Advance to quarterfinals	79–83	—	100–86	74–67
3	(Italy) Dolomiti Energia Trento	6	3	3	441	446	−5		67–57	96–84	—	69–54
4	(Serbia) Partizan NIS	6	2	4	395	409	−14		70–75 (Note: The game was played in Ljubljana, Slovenia, instead of Belgrade by Metropolitans 92 rellocation request due to French legislation imposing quarantine measures on the team after travelling outside the European Union.)	71–69	71–43	—

Source: EuroCup Basketball
Legend: Blue = home team win; Red = away team win.
Rules for classification: All points scored in extra period(s) were not counted in the standings, nor for any tie-break situation.

=== Group G ===
Pos	Team	Pld	W	L	PF	PA	PD	Qualification	VIR	BUD	COL	JLB
1	(Italy) Virtus Segafredo Bologna	6	6	0	549	470	+79	Advance to quarterfinals	—	87–65	90–76	83–62
2	(Montenegro) Budućnost VOLI	6	3	3	504	495	+9	Advance to quarterfinals	89–99	—	79–66	108–80
3	(Slovenia) Cedevita Olimpija	6	3	3	478	486	−8		98–108	74–71	—	94–91
4	(France) JL Bourg	6	0	6	473	553	−80		87–99	89–92	64–77	—

Source: EuroCup Basketball
Legend: Blue = home team win; Red = away team win.
Rules for classification: All points scored in extra period(s) were not counted in the standings, nor for any tie-break situation.

=== Group H ===
Pos	Team	Pld	W	L	PF	PA	PD	Qualification	UNK	HGC	MBA	MOR
1	(Russia) UNICS	6	5	1	494	418	+76	Advance to quarterfinals	—	73–62	85–63	86–61
2	(Spain) Herbalife Gran Canaria	6	3	3	485	486	−1	Advance to quarterfinals	96–90	—	63–66	100–102
3	(Spain) MoraBanc Andorra	6	3	3	432	432	0		66–73	74–79	—	89–61
4	(Montenegro) Mornar	6	1	5	446	521	−75		70–87	81–85	71–74	—

Source: EuroCup Basketball
Legend: Blue = home team win; Red = away team win.
Rules for classification: All points scored in extra period(s) were not counted in the standings, nor for any tie-break situation.

== Playoffs ==
In the playoffs, teams play against each other must win two games to win the series. Thus, if one team wins two games before all three games have been played, the game that remains is omitted. The team that finished in the higher Top 16 place will play the first and the third (if it is necessary) legs of the series at home. The playoffs involves the eight teams which qualified as winners and runners-up of each of the four groups in the Top 16.

=== Bracket ===
Quarterfinals
(France) AS Monaco	76	74	90
(Montenegro) Budućnost VOLI	77	64	87
(France) Metropolitans 92	74	64
(Spain) Herbalife Gran Canaria	84	66
(Italy) Virtus Segafredo Bologna	80	84
(Spain) Joventut Badalona	75	78
(Russia) UNICS	94	74	82
(Russia) Lokomotiv Kuban	88	86	78

Semifinals
(France) AS Monaco	82	76
(Spain) Herbalife Gran Canaria	77	74
(Italy) Virtus Segafredo Bologna	80	81	100
(Russia) UNICS	76	85	107

Finals
(France) AS Monaco	89	86
(Russia) UNICS	87	83

=== Quarterfinals ===
The first legs were played on 23 March, the second legs on 26 March and the third legs on 31 March 2021, if necessary.

Team 1	Series	Team 2	Game 1	Game 2	Game 3
AS Monaco (France)	2–1	(Montenegro) Budućnost VOLI	76–77	74–64 (Note: The game was played in Ljubljana, Slovenia, instead of Podgorica by Monaco rellocation request due to French legislation imposing quarantine measures on the team after travelling outside the European Union.)	90–87
Metropolitans 92 (France)	0–2	(Spain) Herbalife Gran Canaria	74–84	64–66	–
Virtus Segafredo Bologna (Italy)	2–0	(Spain) Joventut Badalona	80–75	84–78	–
UNICS (Russia)	2–1	(Russia) Lokomotiv Kuban	94–88	74–86	82–78

=== Semifinals ===
The first legs were played on 6 April, the second legs on 9 April and the third legs on 14 April 2021, if necessary.

Team 1	Series	Team 2	Game 1	Game 2	Game 3
AS Monaco (France)	2–0	(Spain) Herbalife Gran Canaria	82–77	76–74	–
Virtus Segafredo Bologna (Italy)	1–2	(Russia) UNICS	80–76	81–85	100–107

=== Finals ===
The first leg was played on 27 April, the second leg on 30 April.

Team 1	Series	Team 2	Game 1	Game 2	Game 3
UNICS (Russia)	0–2	(France) AS Monaco	87–89	83–86	–

== Awards ==
All official awards of the 2020–21 EuroCup Basketball.

=== EuroCup MVP ===
Player	Team	Ref.
(United States) Jamar Smith	(Russia) UNICS Kazan	

=== Finals MVP ===
Player	Team	Ref.
(United States) Rob Gray	(France) AS Monaco	

=== All–7DAYS EuroCup Teams ===
All–7DAYS EuroCup First Team		All–7DAYS EuroCup Second Team		Ref
Player	Team	Player	Team	Ref
(Serbia) Miloš Teodosić	(Italy) Virtus Segafredo Bologna	(Lithuania) Mantas Kalnietis	(Russia) Lokomotiv Kuban	
(United States) Jamar Smith	(Russia) UNICS Kazan	(Slovenia) Jaka Blažič	(Slovenia) Cedevita Olimpija	
(France) Isaïa Cordinier	(France) Nanterre 92	(United States) Anthony Brown	(France) Metropolitans 92	
(France) Mathias Lessort	(France) AS Monaco	(United States) John Brown	(Russia) UNICS Kazan	
(United States) Willie Reed	(Montenegro) Budućnost VOLI	(United States) Vince Hunter	(Italy) Virtus Segafredo Bologna	

=== Coach of the Year ===
Player	Team	Ref.
(Montenegro) Zvezdan Mitrović	(France) Monaco	

=== Rising Star ===
Player	Team	Ref.
(Poland) Aleksander Balcerowski	(Spain) Herbalife Gran Canaria	

=== Regular Season MVP ===
Player	Team	Ref.
(Serbia) Miloš Teodosić	(Italy) Virtus Segafredo Bologna	

=== Top 16 MVP ===
Player	Team	Ref.
(United States) Vince Hunter	(Italy) Virtus Segafredo Bologna	

=== Quarterfinals MVP ===
Player	Team	Ref.
(France) Mathias Lessort	(France) AS Monaco	

=== Semifinals MVP ===
Player	Team	Ref.
(United States) Rob Gray	(France) AS Monaco	

=== MVP of the Week ===
Regular season
Week	Player	Team	PIR	Ref.
1	(United States) Troy Caupain	(Germany) ratiopharm Ulm	34	
2	(United States) Willie Reed	(Montenegro) Budućnost VOLI	30	
3	(United States) Alan Williams	(Russia) Lokomotiv Kuban	33	
4	(Lithuania) Gytis Masiulis	(Lithuania) Lietkabelis	38	
5	(France) Pierre Pelos	(France) JL Bourg	33	
6	(United States) Alan Williams (2)	(Russia) Lokomotiv Kuban	36	
7	(Germany) Dylan Osetkowski	(Germany) ratiopharm Ulm	41	
8	(United States) Jamal Jones	(Turkey) Bahçeşehir Koleji	38	
9	(United States) Isaiah Canaan	(Russia) UNICS Kazan	39	
10	(Egypt) Assem Marei	(France) Metropolitans 92	37	

Top 16
Week	Player	Team	PIR	Ref.
1	(United States) Isaiah Whitehead	(Montenegro) Mornar	30	
2	(United States) Luke Maye	(Italy) Dolomiti Energia Trento	34	
3	(Slovenia) Jaka Blažič	(Slovenia) Cedevita Olimpija	41	
4	(France) Alpha Kaba	(France) Nanterre 92	33	
5	(Spain) Jaime Fernández	(Spain) Unicaja	33	
6	(Lithuania) Mindaugas Kuzminskas	(Russia) Lokomotiv Kuban	33	

Quarterfinals
Game	Player	Team	PIR	Ref.
1–2	(United States) Willie Reed (2)	(Montenegro) Budućnost VOLI	35	
3	(France) Mathias Lessort	(France) AS Monaco	29	

Semifinals
Game	Player	Team	PIR	Ref.
1–2	(Serbia) Miloš Teodosić	(Italy) Virtus Segafredo Bologna	34	
3	(United States) John Brown	(Russia) UNICS Kazan	31	

== See also ==
- 2020–21 EuroLeague
- 2020–21 Basketball Champions League
- 2020–21 FIBA Europe Cup
