= 2008–09 Eurocup Basketball =

- League: Eurocup
- Sport: Men's basketball
- Season MVP: (United States) Chuck Eidson (Lietuvos rytas)
- Top scorer: (United States) Khalid El-Amin (Azovmash)

Finals
- Champions: (Lithuania) Lietuvos rytas (2nd title)
- Runners-up: (Russia) Khimki
- Finals MVP: (Lithuania) Marijonas Petravičius

Eurocup Basketball seasons
- ← 2007–08 2009–10 →

2008–09 Eurocup Basketball was the seventh edition of Europe's second-tier level transnational competition for men's professional basketball clubs, the EuroCup, and the first to be contested under the Eurocup name. From the inception of the competition in 2002, it had been known as the ULEB Cup. The EuroCup is the European-wide league level that is one tier below the EuroLeague level.

During this season, there were 48 teams, from 22 countries. After the preliminary rounds, there were 32 teams left for the regular season, with the 16 eliminated teams being relegated down and parachuting into Europe's third-tier transnational competition, the EuroChallenge. Lithuanian club Lietuvos Rytas of Vilnius, won the tournament and promotion to the top level EuroLeague for the next season.

== Teams of the 2008–2009 Eurocup ==
Country	Teams	Clubs (ranking in national league)				
Russia	5	Khimki (2nd)	Dynamo Moscow (3rd)	Ural Great Perm (4th)	UNICS (5th)	Triumph Lyubertsy (6th)
France	4	Chorale Roanne (2nd)	ASVEL (3rd)	Le Havre (5th)	Cholet (8th)	
Spain	4	Pamesa Valencia (6th)	Iurbentia Bilbao (7th)	Cajasol (8th)	Kalise Gran Canaria (9th)	
Germany	3	Telekom Baskets Bonn (2nd)	Artland Dragons (6th)	Brose Baskets (7th)		
Greece	3	Maroussi Costa Coffee (4th)	Aris (5th)	Panellinios (6th)		
Serbia	3	Hemofarm (2nd)	Crvena zvezda (3rd)	FMP (4th)		
Turkey	3	Türk Telekom (2nd)	Beşiktaş Cola Turka (3rd)	Galatasaray Café Crown (4th)		
Belgium	2	Spirou (2nd)	Telindus Oostende (5th)			
Italy	2	Fortitudo Bologna (8th)	Benetton Treviso (10th)			
Israel	2	Bnei HaSharon (3rd)	Hapoel Jerusalem (6th)			
Latvia	2	Barons LMT (1st)	ASK Riga (2nd)			
Lithuania	2	Lietuvos rytas (2nd)	Šiauliai (3rd)			
Poland	2	Turów Zgorzelec (2nd)	Energa Czarni Słupsk (10th)			
Ukraine	2	Azovmash (1st)	Kyiv (2nd)			
Austria	1	Allianz Swans Gmunden (1st)				
Bulgaria	1	Lukoil Academic (1st)				
Croatia	1	Zadar (1st)				
Czech Republic	1	ČEZ Nymburk (1st)				
Estonia	1	Tartu Ülikool Rock (1st)				
Montenegro	1	Budućnost (1st)				
Netherlands	1	MyGuide Amsterdam (1st)				
Switzerland	1	Benetton Fribourg (1st)				

== Format ==
The competition format was also revamped. A total of 48 clubs participated, down from 54 in the previous year's competition. The competition was jointly organized by Euroleague Basketball Company and FIBA Europe.

=== First preliminary round ===
Sixteen teams competed in the first preliminary round, which was organised by FIBA Europe. These teams were paired in two-legged matches, with winners decided on aggregate score. The eight winners advanced to the second preliminary round, and the eight losers parachuted into the third-tier European competition, the EuroChallenge. The matches were played from October 14 through October 21.

Due to a decision of the Italian Basketball Federation to revoke Capo d'Orlando's first division license, followed by an Italian National Olympic Committee (CONI) tribunal rejected appeal by the club, Capo d'Orlando lost the right to participate in European competitions. As a result, Benetton Treviso automatically qualified to the group stage, while Benetton Fribourg advanced to the second qualification round where they met Kalise Gran Canaria.

=== Second preliminary round ===
The second preliminary round, also organised by FIBA Europe, also featured 16 teams, with the eight winners from the first preliminary round joined by eight automatic qualifiers to that phase. As in the first preliminary round, matches were two-legged and decided on aggregate score, with the winners advancing to the Eurocup regular season and the losers parachuting into the EuroChallenge. Matches were played from November 4 to November 11.

=== Regular season ===
Thirty-two teams—24 automatic qualifiers and the eight survivors of the second preliminary round—entered the Regular Season. From this point onward, the competition is organised by Euroleague Basketball Company. The teams were divided into eight groups of four teams each, with each group playing a double round-robin schedule. The first and second-place teams in each group advanced to the Last 16. Regular Season matches were held from November 25, 2008 until January 13, 2009.

=== Last 16 ===
For the first time in the history of the competition, a second group phase was played. The survivors of the Regular Season were divided into four-team groups, each playing a double round-robin schedule. This phase has a direct analogue in the top-tier EuroLeague, which conducts an identical group phase, the Top 16, at the same stage of the competition. As in the EuroLeague Top 16, the first- and second-place teams in each group advance to the next phase. However, unlike the EuroLeague, which conducts a separate quarterfinal round before its Final Four, the Eurocup sent its surviving teams into a single knockout tournament, the Final Eight. Last 16 matches were played from January 27 to March 10, 2009.

=== Final eight ===
Like the Euroleague Final Four, this was a knockout tournament, conducted in one-off matches, held at a single site. The semifinal losers played a single match for third place, and the semifinal winners played a single match for the Eurocup title and an automatic place in the 2009-10 Euroleague. This phase was carried over from the prior ULEB Cup format. Matches were played from April 9 through April 12.

This was the last season for the Final Eight format. From 2009–10 onward, a quarterfinal round has been introduced, consisting of two-legged ties between a group winner and the runner-up from a separate group, with the winner of each tie determined on aggregate score. The quarterfinal winners will advance to the Eurocup Finals, with one-off semifinals followed by a one-off final.

== Preliminary rounds ==
Sixteen teams participated in the first preliminary round, and after the first preliminary round matches, sixteen teams played in a second preliminary round, with the top eight teams from the first preliminary round. Teams that were eliminated from the first or second preliminary round games competed in the EuroChallenge 2008-09.

=== First preliminary round ===
Team 1	Agg.	Team 2	1st leg	2nd leg
Šiauliai (Lithuania)	136–167	(Turkey) Galatasaray Café Crown	73–73	63–94
MyGuide Amsterdam (Netherlands)	133–143	(Serbia) FMP	66–60	67–83
Energa Czarni Słupsk (Poland)	126–151	(Russia) UNICS	76–62	50–89
Allianz Swans Gmunden (Austria)	146–139	(Estonia) Tartu Ülikool Rock	86–64	60–75
Panellinios (Greece)	154–124	(Germany) Telekom Baskets Bonn	69–54	85–70
Triumph Lyubertsy (Russia)	146–159	(Belgium) Telindus Oostende	78–78	68–81
ASK Riga (Latvia)	142–137	(France) Cholet	69–62	73–75

=== Second preliminary round ===
Team 1	Agg.	Team 2	1st leg	2nd leg
Galatasaray Café Crown (Turkey)	147–176	(Montenegro) Budućnost	85–83	62–93
FMP (Serbia)	138–118	(Russia) Ural Great Perm	69–61	69–57
UNICS (Russia)	161–142	(Israel) Hapoel Jerusalem	88–66	73–76
Allianz Swans Gmunden (Austria)	163–178	(Serbia) Crvena zvezda	82–82	81–96
Panellinios (Greece)	168–165	(Ukraine) Kyiv	96–69	72–96
Le Havre (France)	172–168	(Belgium) Telindus Oostende	84–85	88–83
Benetton Fribourg (Switzerland)	125–195	(Spain) Kalise Gran Canaria	64–92	61–103
ASK Riga (Latvia)	151–134	(Spain) Cajasol	83–69	68–65

== Regular season ==
Key to colors
Top two places in each group advance to Top 16

=== Group A ===
Pos	Team	Pld	W	L	PF	PA	PD	Pts	Qualification	MAR	ZAD	ASK	ROA
1	(Greece) Maroussi Costa Coffee	6	4	2	493	468	+25	10	Advanced to Top 16	—	91–75	82–77	88–73
2	(Croatia) Zadar	6	4	2	505	480	+25	10	Advanced to Top 16	87–79	—	83–68	82–70
3	(Latvia) ASK Riga	6	3	3	496	478	+18	9		84–70	106–94	—	86–70
4	(France) Chorale Roanne	6	1	5	430	498	−68	7		72–83	66–84	79–75	—

Source: Eurocup Basketball
Legend: Blue = home team win; Red = away team win.

=== Group B ===
Pos	Team	Pld	W	L	PF	PA	PD	Pts	Qualification	UNI	DYN	BAR	LUK
1	(Russia) UNICS	6	6	0	488	435	+53	12	Advanced to Top 16	—	80–71	76–55	79–72
2	(Russia) Dynamo Moscow	6	4	2	492	442	+50	10	Advanced to Top 16	77–87	—	84–74	94–78
3	(Latvia) Barons LMT	6	1	5	443	489	−46	7		81–86	61–80	—	84–88
4	(Bulgaria) Lukoil Academic	6	1	5	454	511	−57	7		79–80	62–86	75–88	—

Source: Eurocup Basketball
Legend: Blue = home team win; Red = away team win.

=== Group C ===
Pos	Team	Pld	W	L	PF	PA	PD	Pts	Qualification	KHI	BEN	BEŞ	LEH
1	(Russia) Khimki	6	5	1	459	400	+59	11	Advanced to Top 16	—	80–71	91–65	79–55
2	(Italy) Benetton Treviso	6	4	2	478	443	+35	10	Advanced to Top 16	77–59	—	80–89	91–67
3	(Turkey) Beşiktaş Cola Turka	6	3	3	459	471	−12	9		69–71	72–77	—	96–91
4	(France) Le Havre	6	0	6	413	495	−82	6		63–79	76–82	61–68	—

Source: Eurocup Basketball
Legend: Blue = home team win; Red = away team win.

=== Group D ===
Pos	Team	Pld	W	L	PF	PA	PD	Pts	Qualification	TÜR	PNE	ARI	BNE
1	(Turkey) Türk Telekom	6	4	2	393	344	+49	10	Advanced to Top 16	—	70–64	78–65	20–0
2	(Greece) Panellinios	6	3	3	453	435	+18	9	Advanced to Top 16	82–74	—	69–71	85–70
3	(Greece) Aris	6	3	3	457	459	−2	9		79–75	72–77	—	84–71
4	(Israel) Bnei HaSharon	6	2	4	362	427	−65	8		54–76	78–76	89–86	—

Source: Eurocup Basketball
Legend: Blue = home team win; Red = away team win.

=== Group E ===
	(Ukraine) AZO	(Lithuania) LRY	(France) ASV	(Spain) GRA
(Ukraine) AZO		76-66	87-74	92-90
(Lithuania) LRY	83-64		95-74	74-64
(France) ASV	85-83	93-90		69-81
(Spain) GRA	74-82	94-83	78-80	

	Team	Pld	W	L	PF	PA	Diff
1.	(Ukraine) Azovmash	6	4	2	484	472	+12
2.	(Lithuania) Lietuvos rytas	6	3	3	491	465	+26
3.	(France) ASVEL	6	3	3	475	514	-39
4.	(Spain) Kalise Gran Canaria	6	2	4	481	480	+1

=== Group F ===
	(Belgium) SPI	(Serbia) CZV	(Poland) TUR	(Germany) BRO
(Belgium) SPI		71-65	89-69	64-62
(Serbia) CZV	93-91		97-69	82-65
(Poland) TUR	61-86	76-86		67-56
(Germany) BRO	65-84	53-67	39-69	

	Team	Pld	W	L	PF	PA	Diff
1.	(Belgium) Spirou	6	5	1	485	415	+70
2.	(Serbia) Crvena zvezda	6	5	1	490	425	+65
3.	(Poland) PGE Turów	6	2	4	411	453	-42
4.	(Germany) Brose Baskets	6	0	6	340	433	-93

=== Group G ===
	(Spain) VAL	(Germany) ART	(Italy) FOR	(Serbia) FMP
(Spain) VAL		84-67	80-74	83-58
(Germany) ART	79-89		87-78	73-62
(Italy) FOR	71-77	89-93		88-61
(Serbia) FMP	65-84	93-65	59-70	

	Team	Pld	W	L	PF	PA	Diff
1.	(Spain) Pamesa Valencia	6	6	0	497	414	+83
2.	(Germany) Artland Dragons	6	3	3	464	495	-31
3.	(Italy) Fortitudo Bologna	6	2	4	470	457	+13
4.	(Serbia) FMP	6	1	5	398	463	-65

=== Group H ===
	(Spain) BIL	(Serbia) HEM	(Czech Republic) NYM	(Montenegro) BUD
(Spain) BIL		78-67	93-72	69-66
(Serbia) HEM	62-82		82-74	89-85
(Czech Republic) NYM	79-92	80-82		75-70
(Montenegro) BUD	65-67	70-59	63-66	

	Team	Pld	W	L	PF	PA	Diff
1.	(Spain) Iurbentia Bilbao	6	6	0	481	411	+70
2.	(Serbia) Hemofarm	6	3	3	441	469	-28
3.	(Czech Republic) ČEZ Nymburk	6	2	4	446	482	-36
4.	(Montenegro) Budućnost	6	1	5	419	425	-6

== Top 16 ==
The second grand stage begins from January 27, 2009.

Key to colors
Top two places in each group advance to final eight

=== Group I ===
	(Russia) DYN	(Russia) KHI	(Greece) MAR	(Greece) PNE
(Russia) DYN		73-68	94-73	91-84
(Russia) KHI	69-77		94-69	101-94
(Greece) MAR	76-80	71-58		83-85
(Greece) PNE	72-77	73-89	59-71	

	Team	Pld	W	L	PF	PA	Diff
1.	(Russia) Dynamo Moscow	6	6	0	492	442	+50
2.	(Russia) Khimki	6	3	3	479	457	+22
3.	(Greece) Maroussi Costa Coffee	6	2	4	443	470	-27
4.	(Greece) Panellinios	6	1	5	467	512	-45

=== Group J ===
	(Italy) BEN	(Croatia) ZAD	(Russia) UNI	(Turkey) TÜR
(Italy) BEN		94-81	68-66	89-87
(Croatia) ZAD	76-84		93-91	94-86
(Russia) UNI	81-59	69-71		72-57
(Turkey) TÜR	67-99	89-82	66-86	

	Team	Pld	W	L	PF	PA	Diff
1.	(Italy) Benetton Treviso	6	5	1	493	458	+35
2.	(Croatia) Zadar	6	3	3	497	513	-16
3.	(Russia) UNICS	6	3	3	465	414	+51
4.	(Turkey) Türk Telekom	6	1	5	452	522	-70

=== Group K ===
	(Spain) VAL	(Serbia) HEM	(Ukraine) AZO	(Serbia) CZV
(Spain) VAL		65-60	68-66	82-80
(Serbia) HEM	66-62		84-74	88-73
(Ukraine) AZO	91-88	89-71		62-74
(Serbia) CZV	73-85	65-91	72-95	

	Team	Pld	W	L	PF	PA	Diff
1.	(Spain) Pamesa Valencia	6	4	2	450	436	+14
2.	(Serbia) Hemofarm	6	4	2	460	428	+32
3.	(Ukraine) Azovmash	6	3	3	477	457	+20
4.	(Serbia) Crvena zvezda	6	1	5	437	503	-66

=== Group L ===
	(Spain) BIL	(Lithuania) LRY	(Belgium) SPI	(Germany) ART
(Spain) BIL		67-59	82-78	71-62
(Lithuania) LRY	73-71		77-56	105-64
(Belgium) SPI	59-79	78-74		88-79
(Germany) ART	84-79	70-79	82-94	

	Team	Pld	W	L	PF	PA	Diff
1.	(Spain) Iurbentia Bilbao	6	4	2	449	415	+34
2.	(Lithuania) Lietuvos rytas	6	4	2	467	406	+61
3.	(Belgium) Spirou	6	3	3	453	473	-20
4.	(Germany) Artland Dragons	6	1	5	441	516	-75

== Final eight ==
The Final Eight was the last stage of EuroCup 2008-09.

=== Quarter finals ===
April 2, Pala Alpitour, Turin

Team 1	Score	Team 2
Dynamo Moscow (Russia)	85–93	(Serbia) Hemofarm
Benetton Treviso (Italy)	79–85	(Lithuania) Lietuvos rytas

April 3, Pala Alpitour, Turin

Team 1	Score	Team 2
Pamesa Valencia (Spain)	73–76	(Russia) Khimki
Iurbentia Bilbao (Spain)	76–67	(Croatia) Zadar

=== Semi finals ===
April 4, Pala Alpitour, Turin

Team 1	Score	Team 2
Hemofarm (Serbia)	68–73	(Lithuania) Lietuvos rytas
Khimki (Russia)	79–73	(Spain) Iurbentia Bilbao

=== Final ===
April 5, Pala Alpitour, Turin

Team 1	Score	Team 2
Lietuvos rytas (Lithuania)	80–74	(Russia) Khimki

2008–09 Eurocup Champions

Lietuvos rytas
2nd title

== Individual statistics ==
=== Points ===
Rank	Name	Team	Games	Points	PPG
1.	(United States) Khalid El-Amin	(Ukraine) Azovmash	11	197	17.90

=== Rebounds ===
Rank	Name	Team	Games	Rebounds	RPG
1.	(United States) C. J. Wallace	(Italy) Benetton Treviso	13	96	7.38

=== Assists ===
Rank	Name	Team	Games	Assists	APG
1.	(United States) Khalid El-Amin	(Ukraine) Azovmash	11	58	5.27

== Awards ==
=== Eurocup 2008–09 MVP ===
- (United States) Chuck Eidson ( (Lithuania) Lietuvos rytas )

=== Eurocup 2008–09 Finals MVP ===
- (Lithuania) Marijonas Petravičius ( (Lithuania) Lietuvos rytas )

=== All-Eurocup team ===
Season	Position	All-Eurocup First Team	Club Team	All-Eurocup Second Team	Club Team
2008–09	G	(United States) Chuck Eidson	Lietuvos rytas	(United States) Khalid El-Amin	Türk Telekom
2008–09	G	(Russia) Kelly McCarty	Khimki	(United States) Gary Neal	Treviso
2008–09	F	(Slovenia) Boštjan Nachbar	Dynamo Moscow	(Russia) Travis Hansen	Dynamo Moscow
2008–09	F	(Croatia) Marko Banić	Bilbao	(Australia) Matt Nielsen	Valencia
2008–09	C	(North Macedonia) Todor Gečevski	Zadar	(Croatia) Sandro Nicević	Treviso

=== Rising Star ===
- (Serbia) Milan Mačvan ( (Serbia) Hemofarm )

=== Coach of the Year ===
- (Turkey) Oktay Mahmuti ( (Italy) Benetton Treviso )

== See also ==
- 2008–09 Euroleague
- EuroChallenge 2008–09
