= Marko Banić =

Croatian basketball player

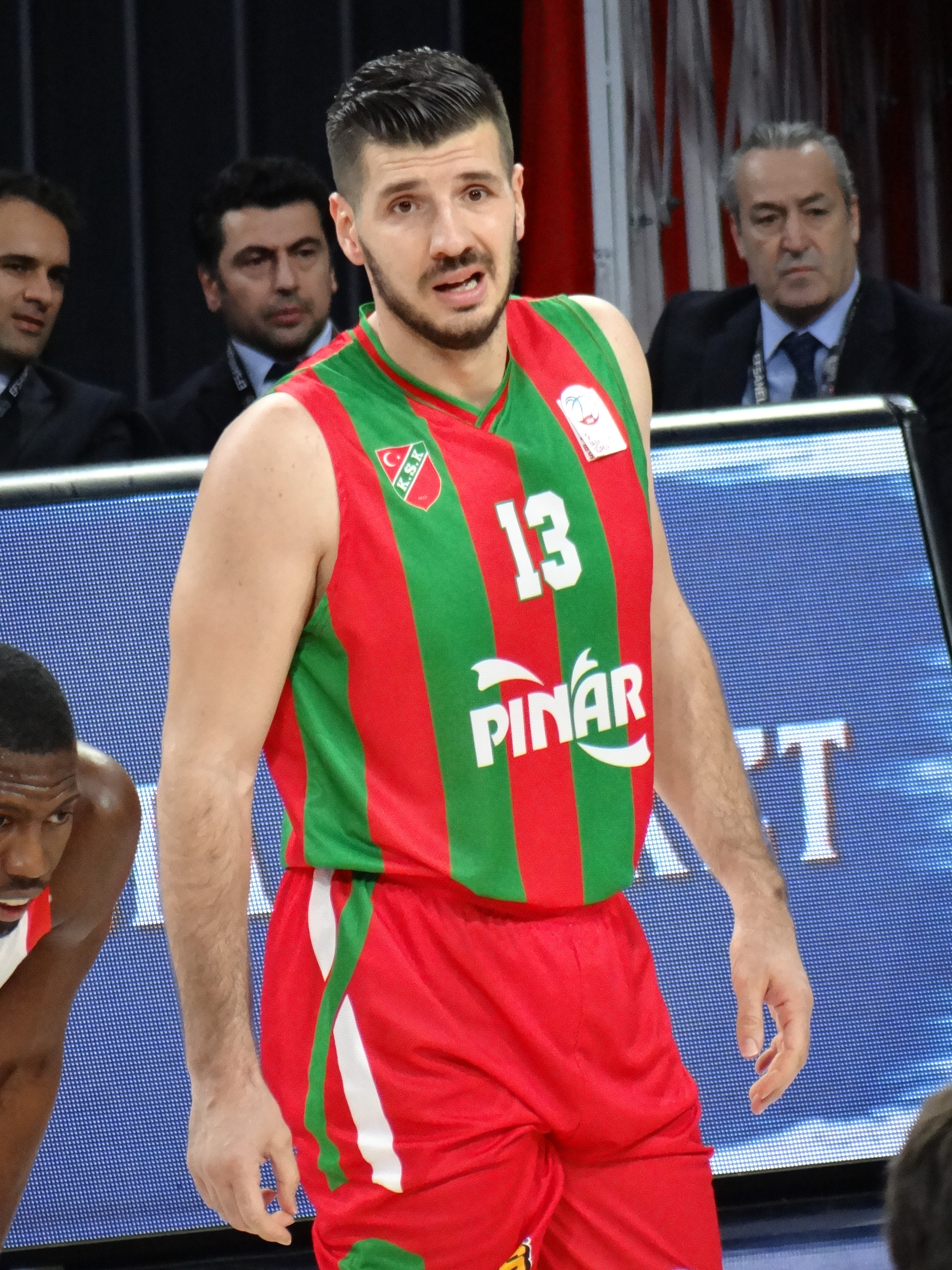
- Banić with Pınar Karşıyaka

Personal information
- Born: August 31, 1984 (age 42) Zadar, SR Croatia, SFR Yugoslavia
- Listed height: 2.06 m (6 ft 9 in)
- Listed weight: 250 lb (113 kg)

Career information
- NBA draft: 2006: undrafted
- Playing career: 2002–2019
- Position: Center / power forward

Career history
- 2002–2005: Zadar
- 2005–2012: Bilbao Basket
- 2012–2013: UNICS Kazan
- 2013–2014: Estudiantes
- 2014–2015: Alba Berlin
- 2015–2017: UNICS Kazan
- 2017–2018: Pınar Karşıyaka
- 2018–2019: Cedevita Zagreb

Career highlights
- Adriatic League champion (2003); Croatian League champion (2005); 3× Croatian Cup winner (2003, 2005, 2019); 2× All-EuroCup Team (2009, 2010); EuroCup MVP (2010)
Medals
Men's basketball
Representing Croatia
European U-18 Championship
| Gold medal – first place | 2002 Germany | U-18 Team |

Marko Banić (born August 31, 1984) is a Croatian former professional basketball player. He is 2.06 m (6 ft 9 in) tall, and he played at the center and power forward positions.

== Professional career ==
Banić has played with Zadar and Bilbao Berri. He was chosen as the EuroCup MVP in 2010.

In June 2012 he signed with a three-year contract with UNICS Kazan in Russia. He was released after suffering a knee injury.

In September 2013, he signed a two-year deal with the Spanish club CB Estudiantes. In September 2014, he left Estudiantes and signed a one-year deal with the German club Alba Berlin.

In September 2015, he returned to UNICS Kazan, signing a 1+1 year contract.

On December 13, 2017, he signed with Turkish club Pınar Karşıyaka.

On November 10, 2018, he signed with Croatian champion Cedevita Zagreb.

== Croatian national team ==
Banić was part of the Croatian national basketball teams at the EuroBasket 2007, the 2008 Olympic Basketball Tournament, the EuroBasket 2009.

== Post-playing career ==
After retiring from professional basketball, Marko Banić turned his focus to developing high-end real estate projects. In Sukošan, a small coastal town near Zadar, he is leading the development of an exclusive modern villa project inspired by the life and legacy of NBA legend Kobe Bryant. The project is characterized by contemporary architectural solutions, luxury amenities, and an emphasis on privacy and the serene atmosphere of the Mediterranean landscape (grace.hr). It combines top-tier design, smart technologies, and features such as infinity pools, private wellness areas, and panoramic sea views. Article about this project was published in New York Times.

== EuroLeague career statistics ==
Legend
| GP | Games played | GS | Games started | MPG | Minutes per game |
| FG% | Field-goal percentage | 3P% | 3-point field-goal percentage | FT% | Free-throw percentage |
| RPG | Rebounds per game | APG | Assists per game | SPG | Steals per game |
| BPG | Blocks per game | PPG | Points per game | PIR | Performance index rating |
| **Bold** | Career high |

| Year | Team | GP | GS | MPG | FG% | 3P% | FT% | RPG | APG | SPG | BPG | PPG | PIR |
|---|---|---|---|---|---|---|---|---|---|---|---|---|---|
| 2011–12 | Gescrap BB | 20 | **12** | **25.2** | .625 | **.200** | .794 | **4.0** | .7 | **.4** | .1 | **13.3** | **13.4** |
| 2014–15 | Alba Berlin | 23 | 8 | 19.5 | **.638** | .000 | **.878** | 2.9 | **.9** | **.4** | **.3** | 8.8 | 9.2 |
| 2016–17 | UNICS | **24** | 4 | 13.3 | .614 | .000 | .818 | 1.7 | .300 | .300 | .200 | 4.6 | 4 |
| Career | | 43 | 20 | 22.2 | .631 | .200 | .826 | 3.4 | .8 | .4 | .2 | 10.9 | 11.2 |
