= 2009–10 Eurocup Basketball =

- League: Eurocup
- Sport: Men's basketball
- Duration: October 20, 2009 – April 18, 2010
- Season MVP: (Croatia) Marko Banić (Bizkaia Bilbao)
- Top scorer: (North Macedonia) Darius Washington (Galatasaray Café Crown)

Finals
- Champions: (Spain) Power Electronics Valencia (2nd title)
- Runners-up: (Germany) Alba Berlin
- Finals MVP: (Australia) Matthew Nielsen (Power Electronics Valencia)

Eurocup Basketball seasons
- ← 2008–09 2010–11 →

2009–10 Eurocup Basketball was the eighth edition of Europe's second-tier level transnational competition for men's professional basketball clubs, the EuroCup. The EuroCup is the European-wide league level that is one tier below the EuroLeague level. It began with qualifying round matches on October 20, 2009, and ended with the Eurocup Finals on April 17 and 18, 2010, at Fernando Buesa Arena in Vitoria-Gasteiz, Basque Country, Spain. The competition was won by Spanish club Power Electronics Valencia, who won their second EuroCup title, and also secured a place in the 2010–11 edition of the EuroCup's parent competition, the EuroLeague.

For the first time, the EuroCup conducted a four-team final round, as in the EuroLeague. To accommodate this change, a quarterfinal round was introduced. As in the EuroLeague, where the top two teams from each of the four groups in its Top 16 phase advanced to the quarterfinals, the top two teams from each group in the analogous Last 16 phase advanced to the quarterfinals. However, the structure of the EuroCup quarterfinals was very different from that of the EuroLeague — instead of a best-of-5 series, as in the EuroLeague, each EuroCup quarterfinal was a two-legged tie, with the winner determined on aggregate score. Unlike virtually all other basketball competitions, the quarterfinals did not use overtime, unless necessary to break an aggregate tie.

== Teams of the 2009–2010 Eurocup ==
Group stage
Country (League)	Teams	Teams (rankings in 2008–09 national championships)		
Russia (Superleague A)	3	UNICS (3)	Spartak Saint Petersburg (4)	Triumph Lyubertsy (6)
Spain (Liga ACB)	2	DKV Joventut (5)	Gran Canaria 2014 (6)	
Turkey (TBL)	2	Türk Telekom Ankara (3)	Galatasaray Café Crown (4)	
Serbia (KLS)	2	Crvena zvezda (2)	Hemofarm (3)	
France (LNB PRO A)	2	Nancy (4)	Cholet (9)	
Italy (Serie A)	1	Lauretana Biella (4)		
Germany (BBL)	1	Telekom Baskets Bonn (2)		
Poland (PLK)	1	Turów Zgorzelec (2)		
Croatia (A1 League)	1	Zadar (2)		
Lithuania (LKL)	1	Šiauliai (3)		
Ukraine (SuperLeague)	1	Azovmash (1)		
Czech Republic (NBL)	1	ČEZ Nymburk (1)		
Losers of Euroleague 2009–10 qualifying rounds
Country (League)	Teams	Teams (rankings in 2008–09 national championships)		
Greece (ESAKE A1)	1	Aris (4)		
France (LNB PRO A)	1	Le Mans (3)		
Belgium (Ligue Ethias)	1	Spirou (1)		
Latvia (LBL)	1	Ventspils (1)		
Italy (Serie A)	1	Benetton Treviso (3)		
Germany (BBL)	1	Alba Berlin (3)		
Qualifying round
Country (League)	Teams	Teams (rankings in 2008–09 national championships)		
Spain (Liga ACB)	2	Power Electronics Valencia (7)	Bizkaia Bilbao (8)	
Russia (Superleague A)	1	Dynamo Moscow (6)		
Turkey (TBL)	1	Beşiktaş Cola Turka (5)		
France (LNB PRO A)	1	Chorale Roanne (5)		
Italy (Serie A)	1	BancaTercas Teramo (6)		
Greece (ESAKE A1)	1	Panellinios (5)		
Israel (BSL)	1	Hapoel Jerusalem (4)		
Germany (BBL)	1	Brose Baskets (4)		
Ukraine (SuperLeague)	1	Dontetsk (2)		
Belgium (Ligue Ethias)	1	Dexia Mons-Hainaut (2)		
Latvia (LBL)	1	VEF Rīga (3)		
Montenegro (Opportunity Liga)	1	Budućnost (1)		
Cyprus (Division A)	1	APOEL (1)		
Netherlands (FEB)	1	MyGuide Amsterdam (1)		
Austria (Admiral League)	1	Kraftwerk Wels (1)		

== Qualifying round ==
Team 1	Agg.	Team 2	1st leg	2nd leg
Amsterdam (Netherlands)	112–141	(Russia) Dynamo Moscow	64–63	48–78
Dexia Mons-Hainaut (Belgium)	139–142	(Spain) Power Electronics Valencia	78–63	61–79
Kraftwerk Wels (Austria)	155–169	(Turkey) Beşiktaş Cola Turka	74–69	81–100
VEF Rīga (Latvia)	158–168	(Greece) Panellinios	79–94	79–74
Brose Baskets (Germany)	129–128	(Montenegro) Budućnost	64–61	65–67
Donetsk (Ukraine)	150–153	(Spain) Bizkaia Bilbao	71–63	79–90
APOEL (Cyprus)	139–140	(Italy) Bancatercas Teramo	77–63	62–77
Chorale Roanne (France)	162–169	(Israel) Hapoel Jerusalem	83–81	79–88

== Regular season ==
Key to colors
Top two places in each group advance to Top 16

=== Group A ===
	Team	Pld	W	L	PF	PA	Diff
1.	(Germany) Alba Berlin	6	5	1	463	459	+4
2.	(Turkey) Galatasaray Café Crown	6	3	3	525	519	+6
3.	(Italy) BancaTercas Teramo	6	2	4	480	482	−2
4.	(Ukraine) Azovmash	6	2	4	496	504	−8

=== Group B ===
	Team	Pld	W	L	PF	PA	Diff	Tie-break
1.	(Spain) Power Electronics Valencia	6	5	1	420	411	+9	
2.	(France) Le Mans	6	3	3	482	445	+37	1–1, +12
3.	(Russia) Triumph Lyubertsy	6	3	3	430	473	−43	1–1, –12
4.	(Serbia) Hemofarm	6	1	5	477	480	−3	

=== Group C ===
	Team	Pld	W	L	PF	PA	Diff	Tie-break
1.	(Greece) Aris	6	5	1	492	450	+42	
2.	(Israel) Hapoel Jerusalem	6	3	3	503	487	+16	1–1, +2
3.	(Croatia) Zadar	6	3	3	500	486	+14	1–1, –2
4.	(Lithuania) Šiauliai	6	1	5	494	566	−72	

=== Group D ===
	Team	Pld	W	L	PF	PA	Diff
1.	(Russia) UNICS Kazan	6	5	1	498	421	+77
2.	(Spain) DKV Joventut	6	5	1	485	457	+28
3.	(Turkey) Beşiktaş Cola Turka	6	1	5	499	578	−79
4.	(Germany) Telekom Baskets Bonn	6	1	5	446	472	−26

=== Group E ===
	Team	Pld	W	L	PF	PA	Diff	Tie-break
1.	(Spain) Bizkaia Bilbao	6	6	0	510	432	+78	
2.	(Turkey) Türk Telekom	6	3	3	479	452	+27	1–1, +11
3.	(Russia) Spartak Saint Petersburg	6	3	3	456	462	−6	1–1, –11
4.	(Belgium) Spirou	6	0	6	384	483	−99	

=== Group F ===
	Team	Pld	W	L	PF	PA	Diff
1.	(Serbia) Crvena zvezda	6	5	1	498	452	+46
2.	(Italy) Benetton Treviso	6	4	2	494	475	+19
3.	(France) Cholet	6	3	3	442	438	+4
4.	(Russia) Dynamo Moscow	6	0	6	430	499	−69

=== Group G ===
	Team	Pld	W	L	PF	PA	Diff
1.	(Greece) Panellinios	6	4	2	457	415	+42
2.	(Spain) Gran Canaria 2014	6	4	2	425	416	+9
3.	(France) Nancy	6	3	3	445	444	+1
4.	(Poland) Turów Zgorzelec	6	1	5	444	496	−52

=== Group H ===
	Team	Pld	W	L	PF	PA	Diff	Tie-break
1.	(Czech Republic) ČEZ Nymburk	6	4	2	469	405	+64	2–2, +16
2.	(Germany) Brose Baskets	6	4	2	495	422	+73	2–2, +1
3.	(Italy) Lauretana Biella	6	4	2	460	437	+23	2–2, –17
4.	(Latvia) Ventspils	6	0	6	346	506	−160	

== Top 16 ==
Key to colors
Top two places in each group advance to quarterfinals

=== Group I ===
	Team	Pld	W	L	PF	PA	Diff	Tie-break
1.	(Germany) Alba Berlin	6	4	2	419	409	+10	
2.	(Greece) Aris	6	3	3	447	407	+40	1–1 +28
3.	(Spain) DKV Joventut	6	3	3	408	431	–23	1–1 –28
4.	(France) Le Mans	6	2	4	420	447	–27	

=== Group J ===
	Team	Pld	W	L	PF	PA	Diff
1.	(Spain) Power Electronics Valencia	6	5	1	487	465	+22
2.	(Israel) Hapoel Jerusalem	6	4	2	507	480	+27
3.	(Russia) UNICS	6	3	3	477	484	–7
4.	(Turkey) Galatasaray Café Crown	6	0	6	526	568	–42

=== Group K ===
	Team	Pld	W	L	PF	PA	Diff	Tie-break
1.	(Spain) Bizkaia Bilbao	6	4	2	447	400	+47	1–1 +13
2.	(Greece) Panellinios	6	4	2	462	457	+5	1–1 –13
3.	(Italy) Benetton Treviso	6	2	4	450	460	–10	1–1 +6
4.	(Germany) Brose Baskets	6	2	4	410	452	–42	1–1 –6

=== Group L ===
	Team	Pld	W	L	PF	PA	Diff	Tie-break
1.	(Spain) Gran Canaria 2014	6	4	2	440	431	+9	
2.	(Czech Republic) ČEZ Nymburk	6	3	3	447	446	+1	1–1 +13
3.	(Serbia) Crvena zvezda	6	3	3	440	426	+14	1–1 –13
4.	(Turkey) Türk Telekom	6	2	4	474	498	–24	

== Quarterfinals ==
The quarterfinals were two-legged ties determined on aggregate score. The first leg of the Bilbao–Nymburk tie was played on March 23, with all other first legs played on March 24. All return legs were played on March 31. The group winner in each tie, listed as "Team #1", hosted the second leg.

Team 1	Agg.	Team 2	1st leg	2nd leg
Alba Berlin (Germany)	133–126	(Israel) Hapoel Jerusalem	61–67	72–59
Power Electronics Valencia (Spain)	156–131	(Greece) Aris	71–64	85–67
Bizkaia Bilbao (Spain)	105–99	(Czech Republic) ČEZ Nymburk	59–47	46–52
Gran Canaria 2014 (Spain)	145–149	(Greece) Panellinios	70–81	75–68

== Final four ==
The first-ever "final four" in the history of the competition, officially called the Eurocup Finals, was held at Fernando Buesa Arena in Vitoria-Gasteiz, Spain. Euroleague Basketball Company was initially noncommital on whether it would schedule a third-place game, but ultimately decided to do so.

=== Semifinals ===
April 17, Fernando Buesa Arena, Vitoria-Gasteiz

Team 1	Score	Team 2
Alba Berlin (Germany)	77–70	(Spain) Bizkaia Bilbao
Power Electronics Valencia (Spain)	92–80	(Greece) Panellinios

=== 3rd place game ===
April 18, Fernando Buesa Arena, Vitoria-Gasteiz

Team 1	Score	Team 2
Bizkaia Bilbao (Spain)	76–67	(Greece) Panellinios

=== Final ===
April 19, Fernando Buesa Arena, Vitoria-Gasteiz

Team 1	Score	Team 2
Alba Berlin (Germany)	44–67	(Spain) Power Electronics Valencia

2009–10 Eurocup Champions

Power Electronics Valencia
2nd Title

=== Final standings ===
	Team
	(Spain) Power Electronics Valencia
Silver medal	(Germany) Alba Berlin
Bronze medal	(Spain) Bizkaia Bilbao
	(Greece) Panellinios

== Awards ==
=== MVP Weekly ===
==== Regular season ====
Week	Player	Team	Performance Index Rating
1.	(Slovakia) Radoslav Rančík	(Turkey) Galatasaray Café Crown	41
2.	(United States) Mire Chatman	(Turkey) Beşiktaş Cola Turka	42
3.	(Lithuania) Mindaugas Kuzminskas	(Lithuania) Šiauliai	34
4.	(North Macedonia) Darius Washington	(Turkey) Galatasaray Café Crown	45
5.	(United States) Brandon Hunter	(Israel) Hapoel Jerusalem	33
6.	(United States) Mike Taylor	(Serbia) Crvena zvezda	35

==== Top 16 ====
Week	Player	Team	Performance Index Rating
1.	(Croatia) Marko Popović (United States) Julius Jenkins	(Russia) UNICS Kazan (Germany) Alba Berlin	26
2.	(United States) Philip Ricci	(Czech Republic) ČEZ Nymburk	34
3.	(Australia) Matthew Nielsen	(Spain) Valencia	29
4.	(Spain) Víctor Claver (United States) Devin Smith	(Spain) Valencia (Greece) Panellinios	26
5.	(United States) Casey Jacobsen	(Germany) Brose Baskets	31
6.	(United States) Marc Salyers	(France) Le Mans	33

==== Quarterfinals ====
Game	Player	Team	Performance Index Rating
1.	(United States) Brandon Hunter	(Israel) Hapoel Jerusalem	32
2.	(Australia) Matthew Nielsen	(Spain) Valencia	25

=== Eurocup MVP ===
- (Croatia) Marko Banić (Bizkaia Bilbao Basket)

=== Eurocup Finals MVP ===
- (Australia) Matthew Nielsen (Power Electronics Valencia)

=== All-Eurocup Team ===
Position	All-Eurocup First Team	Club Team	All-Eurocup Second Team	Club Team
G	(France) Nando De Colo	(Spain) Valencia	(United States) Arthur Lee	(Czech Republic) ČEZ Nymburk
G	(United States) Immanuel McElroy	(Germany) ALBA Berlin	(Greece) Kostas Charalampidis	(Greece) Panellinios
F	(United States) Devin Smith	(Greece) Panellinios	(United States) Dijon Thompson	(Israel) Hapoel Jerusalem
F	(Croatia) Marko Banić	(Spain) Bilbao	(United States) James Augustine	(Spain) Gran Canaria
C	(Australia) Matthew Nielsen	(Spain) Valencia	(Montenegro) Blagota Sekulić	(Germany) ALBA Berlin

=== Coach of the Year ===
- (Greece) Ilias Zouros (Panellinios BC)

=== Rising Star ===
- (Spain) Víctor Claver (Power Electronics Valencia)

== Individual statistics ==
=== Points ===
Rank	Name	Team	Games	Points	PPG
1.	(North Macedonia) Darius Washington	(Turkey) Galatasaray Café Crown	11	238	21.64
2.	(United States) Gary Neal	(Italy) Benetton Basket	11	212	19.27
3.	(Slovakia) Radoslav Rančík	(Turkey) Galatasaray Café Crown	12	226	18.83
4.	(Croatia) Marko Popović	(Russia) UNICS Kazan	12	219	18.25
5.	(United States) Dewarick Spencer	(France) Le Mans	12	211	17.58

=== Rebounds ===
Rank	Name	Team	Games	Rebounds	RPG
1.	(United States) James Augustine	(Spain) Gran Canaria 2014	14	104	7.43
2.	(Slovakia) Radoslav Rančík	(Turkey) Galatasaray Café Crown	12	83	6.92
3	(North Macedonia) Mike Wilkinson	(Turkey) Galatasaray Café Crown	12	78	6.50
4.	(Lithuania) Simas Jasaitis	(Turkey) Galatasaray Café Crown	12	76	6.33
5.	(Turkey) Erwin Dudley	(Turkey) Türk Telekom	11	69	6.27

=== Assists ===
Rank	Name	Team	Games	Assists	APG
1.	(Croatia) Marko Popović	(Russia) UNICS Kazan	12	57	4.75
2.	(Latvia) Kristaps Valters	(Spain) DKV Joventut	12	56	4.67
3.	(North Macedonia) Darius Washington	(Turkey) Galatasaray Café Crown	11	50	4.55
4.	(Turkey) Tutku Açık	(Turkey) Türk Telekom	12	53	4.42
5.	(Israel) Yuval Naimy	(Israel) Hapoel Jerusalem	14	60	4.29
