= Tyrese Rice =

American basketball player (born 1987)

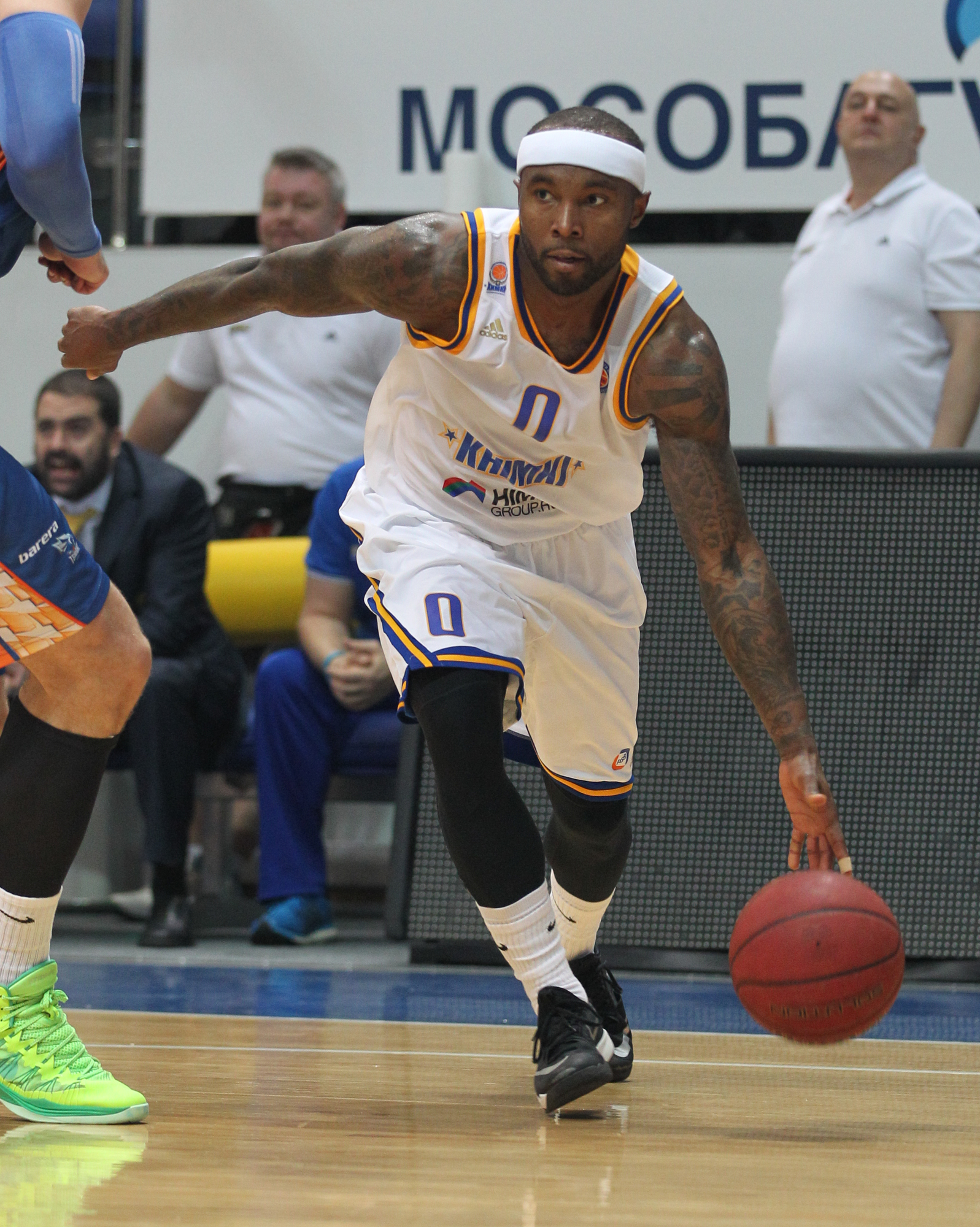
- Rice with Khimki in 2015

Personal information
- Born: May 15, 1987 (age 39) Richmond, Virginia, U.S.
- Listed height: 6 ft 1 in (1.85 m)
- Listed weight: 190 lb (86 kg)

Career information
- High school: L. C. Bird (Chesterfield, Virginia)
- College: Boston College (2005–2009)
- NBA draft: 2009: undrafted
- Playing career: 2009–2020
- Position: Point guard
- Number: 4, 6, 0, 2, 5

Career history
- 2009–2010: Panionios
- 2010–2011: Artland Dragons
- 2011–2012: Lietuvos rytas
- 2012–2013: Bayern Munich
- 2013–2014: Maccabi Tel Aviv
- 2014–2016: Khimki
- 2016–2018: Barcelona
- 2018: Shenzhen Leopards
- 2018–2019: Brose Bamberg
- 2019–2020: Panathinaikos
- 2020: AEK Athens

Career highlights
- EuroLeague champion (2014); EuroLeague Final Four MVP (2014); FIBA Champions League MVP (2019); All-FIBA Champions League Team (2019); EuroCup champion (2015); EuroCup MVP (2015); EuroCup Finals MVP (2015); All-EuroCup First Team (2015); Greek League champion (2020); Israeli Super League champion (2014); Israeli League Cup winner (2013); Israeli State Cup winner (2014); 2× All-Bundesliga First Team (2011, 2013); All-Bundesliga Second Team (2019); All-VTB United League First Team (2015); 2× All-VTB United League Second Team (2012, 2016); Lithuanian All-Star Game (2012); First-team All-ACC (2008); 2× Second-team All-ACC (2007, 2009)

Tyrese Jammal Rice (born May 15, 1987) is an American-born naturalized Montenegrin former professional basketball player. He represented the senior men's national team of Montenegro. Rice played college basketball with the Boston College Eagles.

== Early life ==
Rice was born in Salisbury, North Carolina, to Allison Rice and Wayne Jefferson. His parents ended their relationship soon afterward. Rice attended L. C. Bird High School in Chesterfield, Virginia, and played on the school's basketball team. In his junior and senior seasons, he earned AAA All-State honors from the Virginia High School Coaches Association. In the 2004–05 season, he led his team to a school-record 29 wins and a Central Region title, their first ever. Rice averaged 27.0 points, 6.2 assists and 5.0 rebounds per game that season. He earned 2004–05 Associated Press (Virginia) Co-Player of the Year honors and was named (Richmond) Times-Dispatch Player of the Year.

== Collegiate career ==
Rice signed his letter of intent to play basketball at and attend Boston College on April 28, 2005. As a freshman (2005–06), Rice played in all 36 games, averaging 9.3 points, 1.4 rebounds and 2.5 assists per game. He earned two ACC rookie honors: ACC Rookie of the Week on November 28, 2005, and was named to the ACC All-Freshman team. In his sophomore season (2006–07), Rice started all 33 games, averaging 36.6 minutes a game. He finished the season with stats of 17.6 points, 3.4 rebounds and 5.4 assists per game. Rice was named to the All-ACC second team, and garnered All-Tournament honors for that season's ACC tournament. In two NCAA tournament games, Rice averaged 24 points.

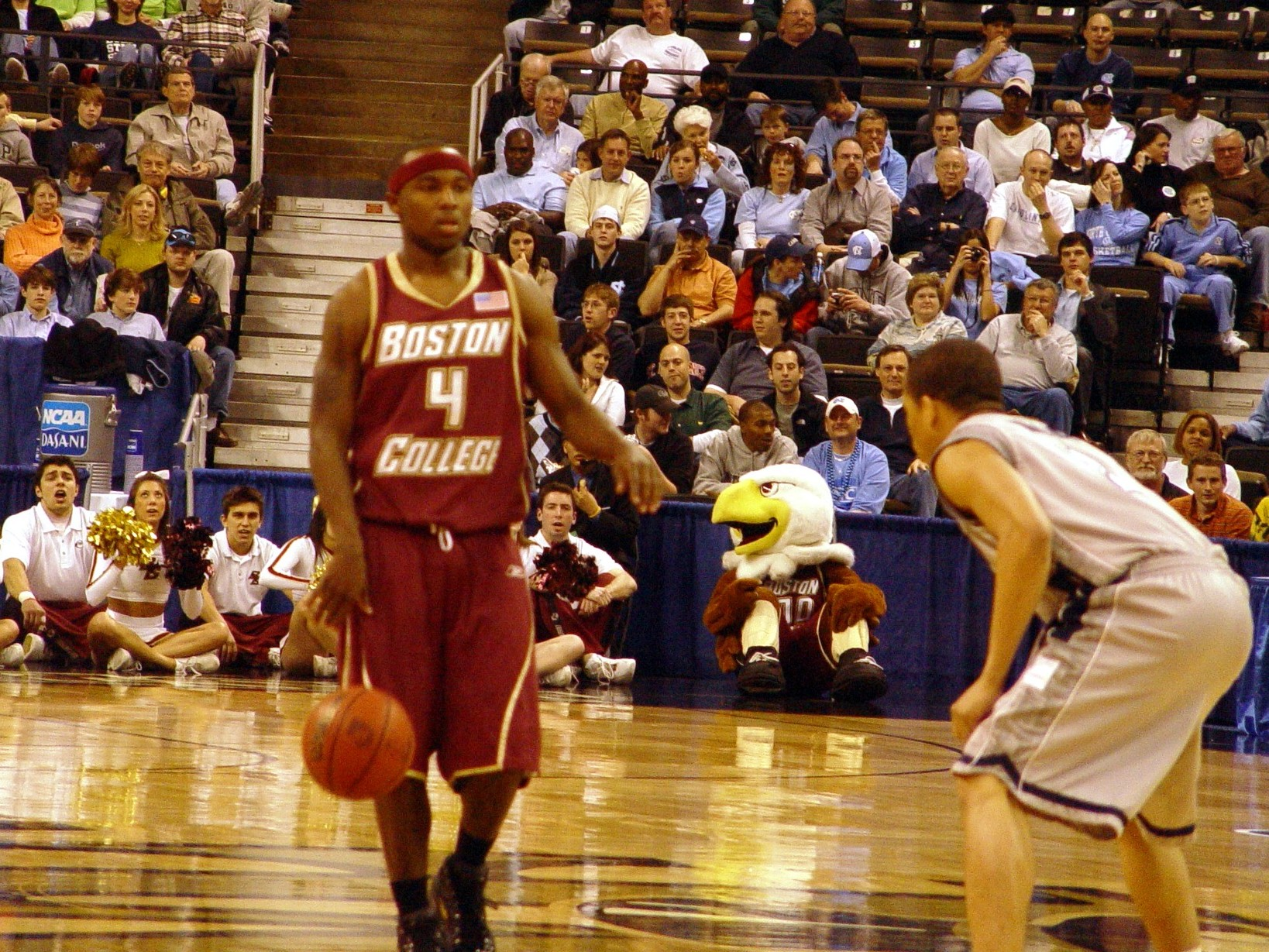
Rice during the 2007 NCAA tournament

A highlight of Rice's junior season (2007–08) was a career-high 46-point performance in a 90–80 home loss to North Carolina on March 1, 2008. He scored 34 points by halftime. Rice averaged 21.0 points, 3.3 rebounds and 5.0 assists per game. He again earned All-ACC honors, this time on the first team. In a scintillating senior year (2008–09), Rice experienced a dip in his scoring, averaging 16.9 points a game but improved in other statistical categories, averaging 3.8 rebounds and 5.4 assists a game. He scored 9 points in BC's only appearance of the 2009 NCAA tournament.

== Professional career ==
Rice went undrafted in the 2009 NBA draft; he had been projected to be selected in the second round or go undrafted. He then joined the Greek League club Panionios for the 2009–10 season.

Rice played for the Utah Jazz in the Orlando Pro Summer League and later with Sacramento Kings in the NBA Summer League in 2010. He was signed by the Artland Dragons for the 2010–11 season, a team in Germany's Basketball Bundesliga, the top league in the country.

In the 2011–12 season Rice played for Lietuvos rytas of the Lithuanian Basketball League. In the 2012–13 season he returned to Germany to play for Bayern Munich.

On July 11, 2013, Rice signed a two-year contract with the Israeli club Maccabi Tel Aviv. In his first season with Maccabi, he won the EuroLeague, with him averaging 9.5 points, 3.2 assists and 2.1 rebounds over 30 games. After beating favored Pallacanestro Olimpia Milano in a dramatic playoff series, Maccabi advanced to the EuroLeague Final Four. In the semifinal game, he was responsible for the 68–67 victory over CSKA Moscow by scoring the game-winner with 5.5 seconds left on the clock. In the championship final game against Real Madrid, he scored 26 points, leading his team to a sixth European title, after an overtime 98–86 victory. For such a performance, he was named the EuroLeague Final Four MVP.

On June 30, 2014, Rice signed a three-year deal with the Russian club Khimki. In the 2014–15 EuroCup season, he was named to the All-EuroCup First Team and selected the EuroCup season MVP. Khimki eventually won the EuroCup, and Rice was named the EuroCup Finals MVP.

On July 26, 2016, Rice signed a two-year contract with FC Barcelona.

On January 15, 2018, Rice parted ways with Barcelona and signed with the Chinese team Shenzhen Leopards for the rest of the season, as a replacement for Keith Langford.

On August 5, 2018, Rice returned to Germany for a third stint, signing a one-year deal with Brose Bamberg. With Bamberg, Rice played in the Basketball Champions League in which he was named the Most Valuable Player of the competition. He led Bamberg to the Final Four, where the team was defeated twice and thus ended in fourth place.

On July 1, 2019, Rice signed with Greek powerhouse Panathinaikos of the Greek Basket League. On December 6, 2019, Rice recorded a career-high 41 points, while shooting 13-of-23 from the field, leading Panathinaikos to a 99–93 overtime win over Olympiacos. In the middle of the year he announced that he would end his career at the end of the season despite his age (33). As a member of Panathinaikos he won the Greek championship. With the Greens he averaged 10.1 points, 4.6 assists and 2.3 rebounds per game in the A1 League and 10.0 points, 2.8 assists and 1.8 rebounds per game in the Euroleague. On August 17, 2020, Rice signed with AEK Athens.

== The Basketball Tournament ==
Rice led Boeheim's Army to The Basketball Tournament 2021 Championship. He was named MVP of the Tournament.

== National team career ==
In July 2013, Rice received a Montenegrin passport that allowed him to play for the senior men's Montenegrin national team at the EuroBasket 2013. He also played at the EuroBasket 2017.

== Career statistics ==
Legend
GP	Games played	GS	Games started	MPG	Minutes per game
FG%	Field-goal percentage	3P%	3-point field-goal percentage	FT%	Free-throw percentage
RPG	Rebounds per game	APG	Assists per game	SPG	Steals per game
BPG	Blocks per game	PPG	Points per game	PIR	Performance index rating
**Bold**	Career high

=== EuroLeague ===
†	Denotes season in which Rice won the EuroLeague
*	Led the league

Year	Team	GP	GS	MPG	FG%	3P%	FT%	RPG	APG	SPG	BPG	PPG	PIR
2013–14†	Maccabi	**30**	5	20.6	.409	**.382**	.850	**2.1**	3.2	.6	**.1**	9.5	9.6
2015–16	Khimki	24	23	29.2	.382	.308	.814	**2.1**	**6.1**	**1.2**	**.1**	12.4	**12.8**
2016–17	Barcelona	**30**	**30**	**29.4**	**.427**	.320	.822	1.6	4.9	1.1	**.1**	**13.0**	10.6
2019–20	Panathinaikos	28*	0	17.4	.408	.380	**.933**	1.1	2.8	.4	.0	10.0	8.6
Career		112	58	24.1	.391	.340	.856	1.7	4.2	.8	.1	11.2	10.3

Source: EuroLeague

=== Domestic leagues ===
Year	Team	League	GP	MPG	FG%	3P%	FT%	RPG	APG	SPG	BPG	PPG
2009–10	(Greece) Panionios	GBL	27	28.3	.488	.296	.814	2.3	2.4	1.1	.0	11.7
2010–11	(Germany) Artland Dragons	BBL	**43**	31.1	**.519**	.364	.810	2.8	5.1	.9	.0	17.2
2011–12	(Lithuania) Lietuvos rytas	LKL	25	20.9	.490	.380	.759	1.4	4.4	1.0	**.1**	9.7
2011–12	(Lithuania) Lietuvos rytas	VTB	21	26.0	.488	**.441**	.798	1.5	3.7	.7	.0	13.5
2012–13	(Germany) Bayern Munich	BBL	40	23.8	.516	.349	.882	1.9	4.4	.8	**.1**	15.8
2013–14	(Israel) Maccabi Tel Aviv	IPL	36	20.0	.511	.359	.750	1.9	2.8	.8	.0	10.2
2014–15	(Russia) Khimki	VTB	40	27.8	.421	.360	**.903**	2.4	6.0	**1.2**	**.1**	15
2015–16	(Russia) Khimki	VTB	34	26.6	.491	.440	.885	2.0	**6.2**	**1.2**	.0	16.2
2016–17	(Spain) Barcelona	ACB	34	25.4	.403	.283	.807	1.4	3.3	.7	.0	11.7
2017–18	(China) Shenzhen Leopards	CBA	18	**32.7**	.439	.341	.877	**2.9**	4.5	1.1	.0	**18.8**

Source: RealGM

=== College ===
Year	Team	GP	GS	MPG	FG%	3P%	FT%	RPG	APG	SPG	BPG	PPG
2005–06	Boston College	**36**	0	20.8	.432	**.391**	.773	1.4	2.5	.7	.1	9.3
2006–07	Boston College	33	**33**	36.6	**.458**	.322	.795	3.4	**5.4**	1.2	**.3**	17.6
2007–08	Boston College	30	30	**38.1**	.433	.358	.846	3.3	5.0	**1.6**	.2	**21.0**
2008–09	Boston College	33	**33**	33.4	.413	.347	**.856**	**3.8**	5.3	1.4	.2	16.9
Career		132	96	31.8	.434	.353	.825	2.9	4.5	1.2	.2	15.9
