= Charles Smith (basketball, born August 1975) =

American basketball player

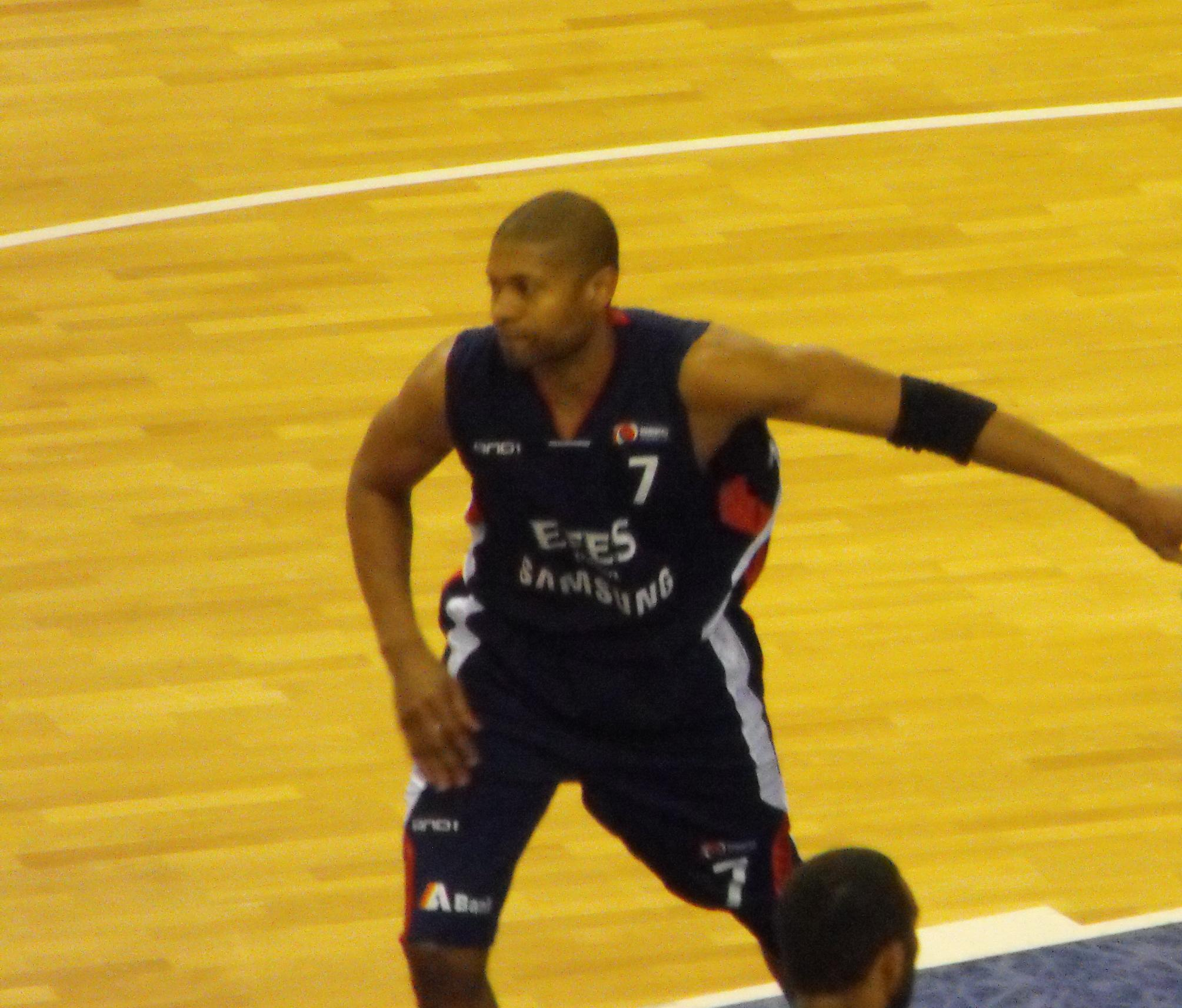
- Smith playing with Efes Pilsen in 2009

Personal information
- Born: August 22, 1975 (age 51) Fort Worth, Texas, U.S.
- Listed height: 6 ft 5 in (1.96 m)
- Listed weight: 200 lb (91 kg)

Career information
- High school: Paul Laurence Dunbar (Fort Worth, Texas)
- College: New Mexico (1993–1997)
- NBA draft: 1997: 1st round, 26th overall pick
- Drafted by: Miami Heat
- Playing career: 1997–2011
- Position: Shooting guard
- Number: 3, 14, 5, 7

Career history
- 1997–1998: Miami Heat
- 1998–1999: Los Angeles Clippers
- 1999–2000: Rockford Lightning
- 2000–2001: Snaidero Udine
- 2001–2002: San Antonio Spurs
- 2002–2003: Portland Trail Blazers
- 2003: Makedonikos
- 2003–2004: Virtus Bologna
- 2004–2005: Scavolini Pesaro
- 2005–2006: Portland Trail Blazers
- 2006: Denver Nuggets
- 2006: Efes Pilsen
- 2006–2008: Real Madrid
- 2008–2010: Efes Pilsen
- 2010–2011: Lottomatica Roma

Career highlights
- Turkish League champion (2009); Turkish Cup winner (2009); Turkish Cup MVP (2009); Turkish President's Cup winner (2009); Spanish League champion (2007); Alphonso Ford EuroLeague Top Scorer Trophy (2005); All-EuroLeague Second Team (2005); EuroCup champion (2007); EuroCup FInals MVP (2007); CBA Newcomer of the Year (2000); All-CBA Second Team (2000); 2× First-team All-WAC (1996, 1997)
- Stats at NBA.com
- Stats at Basketball Reference

Charles Cornelius Smith (born August 22, 1975) is an American former professional basketball player. He was the Alphonso Ford Trophy winner and an All-EuroLeague Second Team selection in 2005.

== High school ==
Smith played high school basketball at Dunbar High School, in Fort Worth.

== College career ==
Collegiately, Smith was a star at the University of New Mexico, with the Lobos.

== Professional career ==
Smith played with the Denver Nuggets, the Portland Trail Blazers, the Miami Heat, the Los Angeles Clippers, and the San Antonio Spurs in the NBA. A prolific scorer, he starred in European national leagues with Makedonikos Kozani, Virtus Bologna, and Efes Istanbul. With the Italian League team Scavolini Pesaro in 2005, he won the first-ever Alphonso Ford Trophy, as he was the best scorer in the 2004–05 EuroLeague season.

He was also named the Finals MVP of the ULEB Cup (now called EuroCup) in the 2006–07 season, while playing with the Spanish ACB League club Real Madrid. He moved back to the Turkish Basketball Super League for the 2008–09 season, when he signed with Efes Pilsen. He moved back to Italy for the 2010–11 season, when he signed a one-year contract with Lottomatica Roma.
