= 2019–20 EuroCup Basketball =

Basketball tournament

2019–20 7DAYS EuroCup^{1}
- Season: 2019–20
- Games played: 168
- Teams: 24

Finals
- Champions: Null and void

Records
- Biggest home win: Unicaja 108–68 Oldenburg (10 December 2019)
- Biggest away win: Rishon LeZion 55–88 Promitheas (2 October 2019)
- Highest scoring: Darüşşafaka 96–106 Bologna (5 March 2020)
- Winning streak: Umana Reyer Venezia; 8 games
- Losing streak: Budućnost VOLI; Maccabi Rishon LeZion; Asseco Arka Gdynia; Dolomiti Energia Trento; 6 games
- Highest attendance: 17,205; Partizan 99–81 Virtus Bologna (8 January 2020)
- Lowest attendance: 1,040; Rishon LeZion 96–92 Ulm (18 December 2019)
- ^{1} Sponsored name, referring to 7DAYS.

The 2019–20 EuroCup Basketball season, also known as 7DAYS EuroCup for sponsorship reasons, was the 18th season of Euroleague Basketball's secondary level professional club basketball tournament. It was the 12th season since it was renamed from the ULEB Cup to the EuroCup, and the fourth season under the title sponsorship name of 7DAYS.

On March 12, 2020, Euroleague Basketball temporarily suspended its competitions due to the COVID-19 pandemic. On May 25, 2020, Euroleague Basketball cancelled its competitions due to the COVID-19 pandemic.

== Team allocation ==
A total of 24 teams from 13 countries participated in the 2019–20 EuroCup Basketball.

=== Distribution by league ===
The following was the access criteria for this season, based on domestic league standings after playoffs.

Access list for 2019–20 EuroCup Basketball
	Teams entering in this round	Teams advancing from previous round
Regular season (24 teams)	3 teams from Adriatic League; 3 teams from United Basketball League; 3 teams from Spain; 2 teams from France; 2 teams from Germany; 2 teams from Italy; 2 teams from Turkey; 1 team from Greece; 1 team from Lithuania; 1 team from Poland; 1 team from either Belgium, Israel or Netherlands; 3 wild cards	
Top 16 (16 teams)		4 group winners from the regular season; 4 group runners-up from the regular season; 4 group third-placed teams from the regular season; 4 group fourth-placed teams from the regular season
Playoffs (8 teams)		4 group winners from the Top 16; 4 group runners-up from the Top 16

=== Teams ===
The labels in the parentheses show how each team qualified for the place of its starting round:

- 1st, 2nd, 3rd, etc.: League position after Playoffs
- WC: Wild card

Qualified teams for 2019–20 EuroCup Basketball (by entry round)
Regular season
(Italy) Umana Reyer Venezia (1st)	(Serbia) Partizan NIS (4th)	(France) Limoges CSP (WC)	(Russia) UNICS (3rd)
(Italy) Dolomiti Energia Trento (6th)	(Spain) Unicaja (6th)	(Turkey) Tofaş (3rd)	(Russia) Lokomotiv Kuban (5th)
(Italy) Segafredo Virtus Bologna (WC)	(Spain) Joventut (7th)	(Turkey) Galatasaray Doğa Sigorta (4th)	(Greece) Promitheas (2nd)
(Italy) Germani Brescia Leonessa (WC)	(Spain) MoraBanc Andorra (10th)	(Turkey) Darüşşafaka Tekfen (WC)	(Israel) Maccabi Rishon LeZion (2nd)
(Montenegro) Budućnost VOLI (2nd)	(France) AS Monaco (2nd)	(Germany) EWE Baskets Oldenburg (3rd)	(Lithuania) Rytas (2nd)
(Slovenia) Cedevita Olimpija (3rd)	(France) Nanterre 92 (4th)	(Germany) ratiopharm Ulm (6th)	(Poland) Asseco Arka Gdynia (3rd)

Notes

1. ABA League (ABA): Budućnost VOLI, Cedevita Olimpija and Partizan NIS qualified through the ABA League.
2. France (FRA): AS Monaco is a club based in Monaco (which does not qualify for European competitions), but participate in European competitions through one of the berths for France (any coefficient points it earns count toward France).
3. Spain (ESP): MoraBanc Andorra is a club based in Andorra (which does not qualify for European competitions), but participate in European competitions through one of the berths for Spain (any coefficient points it earns count toward Spain).

== Round and draw dates ==
The schedule of the competition was as follows.

Schedule for 2019–20 EuroCup Basketball
Phase	Round	Draw date	First leg	Second leg	Third leg
Regular season	Round 1	12 July 2019	1–2 October 2019		
Regular season	Round 2	12 July 2019	8–9 October 2019		
Regular season	Round 3	12 July 2019	15–16 October 2019		
Regular season	Round 4	12 July 2019	22–23 October 2019		
Regular season	Round 5	12 July 2019	29–30 October 2019		
Regular season	Round 6	12 July 2019	5–6 November 2019		
Regular season	Round 7	12 July 2019	12–13 November 2019		
Regular season	Round 8	12 July 2019	19–20 November 2019		
Regular season	Round 9	12 July 2019	10–11 December 2019		
Regular season	Round 10	12 July 2019	17–18 December 2019		
Top 16	Round 1	12 July 2019	7–8 January 2020		
Top 16	Round 2	12 July 2019	14–15 January 2020		
Top 16	Round 3	12 July 2019	21–22 January 2020		
Top 16	Round 4	12 July 2019	28–29 January 2020		
Top 16	Round 5	12 July 2019	4–5 February 2020		
Top 16	Round 6	12 July 2019	3–4 March 2020		
Playoffs	Quarterfinals	12 July 2019	17 March 2020	20 March 2020	25 March 2020
Playoffs	Semifinals	12 July 2019	31 March 2020	3 April 2020	8 April 2020
Playoffs	Finals	12 July 2019	21 April 2020	24 April 2020	27 April 2020

=== Draw ===
The draw was held on 12 July 2019 at the Mediapro Auditorium in Barcelona.

The 24 teams were drawn into four groups of six, with the restriction that teams from the same league could not be drawn against each other. For the draw, the teams were seeded into six pots, in accordance with the Club Ranking, based on their performance in European competitions during a three-year period and the lowest possible position that any club from that league can occupy in the draw is calculated by adding the results of the worst performing team from each league.

Pot 1
Team	Pts
(Greece) Promitheas	161^{†}
(Turkey) Darüşşafaka Tekfen	139
(Spain) Unicaja	121
(Russia) Lokomotiv Kuban	118

Pot 4
Team	Pts
(Spain) MoraBanc Andorra	58^{†}
(Spain) Joventut	58^{†}
(Germany) EWE Baskets Oldenburg	56^{†}
(France) Limoges CSP	47

Pot 2
Team	Pts
(Russia) UNICS	117
(Israel) Maccabi Rishon LeZion	95^{†}
(Turkey) Galatasaray Doğa Sigorta	80
(Lithuania) Rytas	77

Pot 5
Team	Pts
(Serbia) Partizan NIS	35
(Italy) Dolomiti Energia Trento	35^{†}
(France) AS Monaco	35^{†}
(Italy) Germani Brescia Leonessa	35^{†}

Pot 3
Team	Pts
(Montenegro) Budućnost VOLI	77
(Slovenia) Cedevita Olimpija	70
(Turkey) Tofaş	70^{†}
(Germany) ratiopharm Ulm	58

Pot 6
Team	Pts
(France) Nanterre 92	35^{†}
(Italy) Umana Reyer Venezia	35^{†}
(Italy) Segafredo Virtus Bologna	35^{†}
(Poland) Asseco Arka Gdynia	11

Notes

^† Indicates teams with points applying the minimum for the league they play.

The fixtures were decided after the draw, using a computer draw not shown to public, with the following match sequence:

Note: Positions for scheduling do not use the seeding pots, e.g., Team 1 is not necessarily the team from Pot 1 in the draw.

Round	Matches
Round 1	6 v 3, 4 v 2, 5 v 1
Round 2	1 v 6, 2 v 5, 3 v 4
Round 3	6 v 4, 5 v 3, 1 v 2
Round 4	6 v 2, 3 v 1, 4 v 5
Round 5	5 v 6, 1 v 4, 2 v 3

Round	Matches
Round 6	1 v 5, 2 v 4, 3 v 6
Round 7	4 v 3, 5 v 2, 6 v 1
Round 8	2 v 1, 3 v 5, 4 v 6
Round 9	5 v 4, 1 v 3, 2 v 6
Round 10	3 v 2, 4 v 1, 6 v 5

There were scheduling restrictions: for example, teams from the same city in general are not scheduled to play at home in the same round (to avoid them playing at home on the same day or on consecutive days, due to logistics and crowd control).

== Regular season ==
Location of teams of the 2019–20 EuroCup regular season.
Red: Group A; Green: Group B; Blue: Group C; Yellow: Group D.

In each group, teams played against each other home-and-away in a round-robin format. The group winners, runners-up, third-placed teams and fourth-placed teams advanced to the Top 16, while the fifth-placed teams and sixth-placed teams were eliminated. The rounds were 1–2 October, 8–9 October, 15–16 October, 22–23 October, 29–30 October, 5–6 November, 12–13 November, 19–20 November, 10–11 December, and 17–18 December 2019.

=== Group A ===
Pos	Team	Pld	W	L	PF	PA	PD	Qualification	VIR	MBA	ASM	PRO	MRL	ULM
1	(Italy) Segafredo Virtus Bologna	10	8	2	846	791	+55	Advance to Top 16	—	87–72	77–75	88–75	96–77	92–91
2	(Spain) MoraBanc Andorra	10	7	3	853	766	+87	Advance to Top 16	93–79	—	95–68	81–91	84–61	97–78
3	(France) Monaco	10	6	4	763	732	+31	Advance to Top 16	72–81	82–66	—	80–59	77–75	82–65
4	(Greece) Promitheas	10	6	4	771	751	+20	Advance to Top 16	78–69	66–80	74–77	—	88–77	82–77
5	(Israel) Maccabi Rishon LeZion	10	2	8	740	862	−122		79–85	67–86	77–72	55–88	—	96–92
6	(Germany) ratiopharm Ulm	10	1	9	793	864	−71		79–92	87–99	63–78	67–70	103–89	—

Source: EuroCup Basketball
Legend: Blue = home team win; Red = away team win.
Rules for classification: All points scored in extra period(s) were not counted in the standings, nor for any tie-break situation.

=== Group B ===
Pos	Team	Pld	W	L	PF	PA	PD	Qualification	URV	PAR	TOF	RYT	LOK	CSP
1	(Italy) Umana Reyer Venezia	10	8	2	759	713	+46	Advance to Top 16	—	63–66	76–65	76–74	66–61	93–85
2	(Serbia) Partizan NIS	10	7	3	767	722	+45	Advance to Top 16	69–83	—	93–80	86–81	80–71	77–58
3	(Turkey) Tofaş	10	5	5	804	822	−18	Advance to Top 16	73–80	82–72	—	91–81	92–90	84–71
4	(Lithuania) Rytas	10	4	6	800	811	−11	Advance to Top 16	72–81	61–66	99–83	—	92–86	92–78
5	(Russia) Lokomotiv Kuban	10	4	6	797	780	+17		77–63	83–76	69–72	82–87	—	86–75
6	(France) Limoges CSP	10	2	8	748	827	−79		71–78	60–82	91–82	82–61	77–92	—

Source: EuroCup Basketball
Legend: Blue = home team win; Red = away team win.
Rules for classification: All points scored in extra period(s) were not counted in the standings, nor for any tie-break situation.

=== Group C ===
Pos	Team	Pld	W	L	PF	PA	PD	Qualification	UNK	BRE	DTI	CJB	NTR	OLI
1	(Russia) UNICS	10	6	4	783	775	+8	Advance to Top 16	—	77–63	71–68	86–74	72–79	80–67
2	(Italy) Germani Brescia Leonessa	10	6	4	705	725	−20	Advance to Top 16	84–75	—	35–61	87–83	85–78	78–71
3	(Turkey) Darüşşafaka Tekfen	10	5	5	746	708	+38	Advance to Top 16	77–79	61–70	—	92–86	72–65	72–76
4	(Spain) Joventut	10	5	5	838	834	+4	Advance to Top 16	90–73	81–68	85–82	—	79–77	101–81
5	(France) Nanterre 92	10	4	6	792	809	−17		92–94	65–73	68–82	85–78	—	90–87
6	(Slovenia) Cedevita Olimpija	10	4	6	799	812	−13		81–76	73–62	73–79	103–81	87–93	—

Source: EuroCup Basketball
Legend: Blue = home team win; Red = away team win.
Rules for classification: All points scored in extra period(s) were not counted in the standings, nor for any tie-break situation.

=== Group D ===
Pos	Team	Pld	W	L	PF	PA	PD	Qualification	UNI	GAL	EWE	TRE	BUD	ARK
1	(Spain) Unicaja	10	7	3	845	774	+71	Advance to Top 16	—	88–83	108–68	93–74	83–70	91–69
2	(Turkey) Galatasaray Doğa Sigorta	10	6	4	813	792	+21	Advance to Top 16	91–80	—	92–79	76–81	84–83	92–73
3	(Germany) EWE Baskets Oldenburg	10	6	4	840	850	−10	Advance to Top 16	91–78	79–72	—	108–88	102–99	74–78
4	(Italy) Dolomiti Energia Trento	10	5	5	797	817	−20	Advance to Top 16	88–76	64–70	91–81	—	69–76	80–91
5	(Montenegro) Budućnost VOLI	10	3	7	784	775	+9		81–82	94–78	83–85	68–77	—	59–62
6	(Poland) Asseco Arka Gdynia	10	3	7	710	781	−71		59–66	78–83	61–73	78–85	61–78	—

Source: EuroCup Basketball
Legend: Blue = home team win; Red = away team win.
Rules for classification: All points scored in extra period(s) were not counted in the standings, nor for any tie-break situation.

== Top 16 ==
In each group, teams played against each other home-and-away in a round-robin format. The group winners and runners-up advanced to the playoffs, while the third-placed teams and fourth-placed teams were eliminated. The rounds were 7–8 January, 14–15 January, 21–22 January, 28–29 January, 4–5 February and 3–5 March 2020.

=== Group E ===
Pos	Team	Pld	W	L	PF	PA	PD	Qualification	PAR	VIR	DTI	TRE
1	(Serbia) Partizan NIS	6	5	1	489	418	+71	Advance to quarterfinals	—	99–81	69–57	91–75
2	(Italy) Segafredo Virtus Bologna	6	4	2	519	488	+31	Advance to quarterfinals	82–84	—	83–72	94–70
3	(Turkey) Darüşşafaka Tekfen	6	3	3	458	464	−6		65–63	96–106 (Note: Match was played at neutral court in Štark Arena, Belgrade, due to impossibility for the away team, Segafredo Virtus Bologna, to enter into Turkish territory, due to the COVID-19 pandemic.)	—	73–69
4	(Italy) Dolomiti Energia Trento	6	0	6	413	509	−96		58–83	67–73	74–95	—

Source: EuroCup Basketball
Legend: Blue = home team win; Red = away team win.
Rules for classification: All points scored in extra period(s) were not counted in the standings, nor for any tie-break situation.

=== Group F ===
Pos	Team	Pld	W	L	PF	PA	PD	Qualification	PRO	URV	EWE	BRE
1	(Greece) Promitheas	6	4	2	440	383	+57	Advance to quarterfinals	—	68–70	81–70	67–56
2	(Italy) Umana Reyer Venezia	6	4	2	452	462	−10	Advance to quarterfinals	52–70	—	82–78	68–60
3	(Germany) EWE Baskets Oldenburg	6	2	4	474	501	−27		72–97	98–87	—	89–84
4	(Italy) Germani Brescia Leonessa	6	2	4	421	441	−20		63–57	88–93	70–67	—

Source: EuroCup Basketball
Legend: Blue = home team win; Red = away team win.
Rules for classification: All points scored in extra period(s) were not counted in the standings, nor for any tie-break situation.

=== Group G ===
Pos	Team	Pld	W	L	PF	PA	PD	Qualification	ASM	UNK	RYT	GAL
1	(France) Monaco	6	4	2	494	443	+51	Advance to quarterfinals	—	85–60	86–61	73–85
2	(Russia) UNICS	6	3	3	481	483	−2	Advance to quarterfinals	78–84	—	82–69	94–69
3	(Lithuania) Rytas	6	3	3	468	482	−14		80–75	86–91	—	83–75
4	(Turkey) Galatasaray Doğa Sigorta	6	2	4	471	506	−35		79–91	90–76	73–89	—

Source: EuroCup Basketball
Legend: Blue = home team win; Red = away team win.
Rules for classification: All points scored in extra period(s) were not counted in the standings, nor for any tie-break situation.

=== Group H ===
Pos	Team	Pld	W	L	PF	PA	PD	Qualification	UNI	TOF	CJB	MBA
1	(Spain) Unicaja	6	4	2	510	500	+10	Advance to quarterfinals	—	76–68	90–84	84–75
2	(Turkey) Tofaş	6	4	2	493	479	+14	Advance to quarterfinals	84–82	—	91–76	97–94
3	(Spain) Joventut	6	3	3	528	528	0		101–86	88–84	—	90–87
4	(Spain) MoraBanc Andorra	6	1	5	497	521	−24		88–92	63–69	90–89	—

Source: EuroCup Basketball
Legend: Blue = home team win; Red = away team win.
Rules for classification: All points scored in extra period(s) were not counted in the standings, nor for any tie-break situation.

== Playoffs ==
It was planned, in the playoffs, teams play against each other must win two games to win the series. Thus, if one team wins two games before all three games have been played, the game that remains is omitted. The team that finished in the higher Top 16 place will play the first and the third (if it is necessary) legs of the series at home. The playoffs involves the eight teams which qualified as winners and runners-up of each of the four groups in the Top 16.

=== Bracket ===
Quarterfinals
(Serbia) Partizan NIS	—	—	—
(Russia) UNICS	—	—	—
(Greece) Promitheas	—	—	—
(Turkey) Tofaş	—	—	—
(France) Monaco	—	—	—
(Italy) Segafredo Virtus Bologna	—	—	—
(Spain) Unicaja	—	—	—
(Italy) Umana Reyer Venezia	—	—	—

Semifinals
—	—	—
—	—	—
—	—	—
—	—	—

Finals
—	—	—
—	—	—

=== Quarterfinals ===
The first legs were to be played on 17 March, the second legs on 20 March and the third legs on 25 March 2020, if necessary.

Team 1	Series	Team 2	Game 1	Game 2	Game 3
Partizan NIS (Serbia)	Game A	(Russia) UNICS	Cancelled	Cancelled	Cancelled
Promitheas (Greece)	Game B	(Turkey) Tofaş	Cancelled	Cancelled	Cancelled
Monaco (France)	Game C	(Italy) Segafredo Virtus Bologna	Cancelled	Cancelled	Cancelled
Unicaja (Spain)	Game D	(Italy) Umana Reyer Venezia	Cancelled	Cancelled	Cancelled

=== Semifinals ===
The first legs were to be played on 31 March, the second legs on 3 April and the third legs on 8 April 2020, if necessary.

Team 1	Series	Team 2	Game 1	Game 2	Game 3
Winner A or B		Winner A or B	Cancelled	Cancelled	Cancelled
Winner C or D		Winner C or D	Cancelled	Cancelled	Cancelled

=== Finals ===
The first leg were to be played on 21 April, the second leg on 24 April, and the third leg on 27 April 2020, if necessary.

Team 1	Series	Team 2	Game 1	Game 2	Game 3
			Cancelled	Cancelled	Cancelled

== Attendances ==
Pos	Team	Total	High	Low	Average	Change
1	(Serbia) Partizan NIS	71,230	17,205	4,530	8,904	+47.8%
2	(Spain) Unicaja	45,784	6,915	4,900	5,723	+4.7%
3	(Lithuania) Rytas	35,071	6,328	2,380	4,384	−14.6%
4	(Turkey) Tofaş	34,123	6,204	1,815	4,265	+86.7%
5	(France) Limoges	18,862	4,287	3,466	3,772	−5.0%
6	(Germany) ratiopharm Ulm	17,076	3,820	3,104	3,415	+4.0%
7	(Italy) Segafredo Virtus Bologna	25,835	4,578	2,786	3,229	n/a
8	(Turkey) Galatasaray Doğa Sigorta	25,755	4,826	1,935	3,219	+65.8%
9	(Italy) Umana Reyer Venezia	24,998	3,452	2,873	3,125	n/a
10	(Russia) UNICS	23,713	3,780	1,472	2,964	−19.4%
11	(Germany) EWE Baskets Oldenburg	23,019	5,750	1,757	2,877	n/a
12	(Italy) Germani Brescia Leonessa	19,148	3,312	2,324	2,735	+6.8%
13	(Russia) Lokomotiv Kuban	13,365	3,014	2,356	2,673	−11.5%
14	(Turkey) Darüşşafaka Tekfen	18,084	3,781	1,335	2,583	−4.0%^{1}
15	(Montenegro) Budućnost VOLI	12,295	3,584	1,830	2,459	−48.7%^{1}
16	(Spain) MoraBanc Andorra	19,597	3,614	1,790	2,450	−14.9%
17	(Spain) Joventut	18,280	2,860	1,221	2,285	n/a
18	(Greece) Promitheas	18,080	3,084	1,649	2,260	n/a
19	(Israel) Maccabi Rishon LeZion	9,184	3,092	1,040	1,837	n/a
20	(France) Monaco	12,318	2,054	1,422	1,760	+1.7%
21	(France) Nanterre 92	8,399	2,005	1,482	1,680	n/a
22	(Italy) Dolomiti Energia Trento	13,418	2,102	1,185	1,677	−4.6%
23	(Slovenia) Cedevita Olimpija	8,192	2,400	1,114	1,638	n/a
24	(Poland) Asseco Arka Gdynia	8,074	1,893	1,402	1,615	+4.7%
	League total	523,900	17,205	1,040	3,118	−19.1%

Source: EuroCup
Notes:
1: 2018–19 season average applied to EuroLeague games

== Awards ==
All official awards of the 2019–20 EuroCup Basketball.

=== Regular season MVP ===
Player	Team	Ref.
(Serbia) Miloš Teodosić	(Italy) Segafredo Virtus Bologna	

=== Top 16 MVP ===
Player	Team	Ref.
(United States) Devin Williams	(Turkey) Tofaş	

=== MVP of the Round ===
Regular season
Round	Player	Team	PIR	Ref.
1	(United States) Chris Babb	(Greece) Promitheas	29	
1	(Canada) Kenny Chery	(France) Nanterre 92	29	
1	(United States) Greg Whittington	(Turkey) Galatasaray Doğa Sigorta	29	
2	(Serbia) Rade Zagorac	(Serbia) Partizan NIS	35	
3	(United States) Alex Hamilton	(Israel) Maccabi Rishon LeZion	38	
4	(United States) Errick McCollum	(Russia) UNICS	41	
5	(Slovenia) Zoran Dragić	(Germany) ratiopharm Ulm	30	
5	(United States) Derek Willis	(Germany) ratiopharm Ulm	30	
6	(United States) Mitchell Watt	(Italy) Umana Reyer Venezia	37	
7	(United States) Hassan Martin	(Montenegro) Budućnost VOLI	29	
7	(Dominican Republic) Sammy Mejía	(Turkey) Tofaş	29	
8	(Greece) Michael Bramos	(Italy) Umana Reyer Venezia	28	
8	(United States) Tyler Larson	(Germany) EWE Baskets Oldenburg	28	
9	(Italy) Alessandro Gentile	(Italy) Dolomiti Energia Trento	39	
10	(United States) James Kelly	(Israel) Maccabi Rishon LeZion	40	

Top 16
Round	Player	Team	PIR	Ref.
1	(Austria) Rašid Mahalbašić	(Germany) EWE Baskets Oldenburg	38	
2	(Ivory Coast) Deon Thompson	(Spain) Unicaja	27	
3	(Slovenia) Klemen Prepelič	(Spain) Joventut	45	
4	(Greece) Loukas Mavrokefalidis	(Greece) Promitheas	37	
5	(United States) Corey Walden	(Serbia) Partizan NIS	33	
6	(United States) Devin Williams	(Turkey) Tofaş	32	

== See also ==
- 2019–20 EuroLeague
- 2019–20 Euroleague Basketball Next Generation Tournament
- 2019–20 Basketball Champions League
- 2019–20 FIBA Europe Cup
