= 2025–26 EuroCup Basketball regular season =

EuroCup Basketball regular season regular season
- Season: 2025–26
- Dates: 30 September 2025 – 11 February 2026
- Games played: 180
- Teams: 20 (from 13 countries)

The 2025–26 EuroCup Basketball regular season began on 30 September 2025 and ended on 11 February 2026. A total of 20 teams compete in the regular season to decide the 12 playoff spots.

== Draw ==
The draw was held on 4 July 2025 in Barcelona, Spain.

The 20 teams were drawn into two groups of 10, with the restriction that teams from the same league could not be drawn against each other, except when there were more than two teams from the same league participating in the regular season. For the draw, the teams were seeded into 10 pots, in accordance with the Club Ranking, based on their performance in European competitions during a three-year period and the lowest possible position that any club from that league can occupy in the draw is calculated by adding the results of the worst performing team from each league.

Pot 1 Team (Israeli Basketball Association) Hapoel Midtown Jerusalem (Turkish Basketball Federation) Türk Telekom	Pot 2 Team (French Federation of Basketball) Cosea JL Bourg (Spanish Basketball Federation) Baxi Manresa
Pot 3 Team (German Basketball Federation) ratiopharm Ulm (Romanian Basketball Federation) U-BT Cluj-Napoca	Pot 4 Team (Turkish Basketball Federation) Beşiktaş Gain (Turkish Basketball Federation) Bahçeşehir Koleji
Pot 5 Team (Italian Basketball Federation) Umana Reyer Venezia (Basketball Federation of Montenegro) Budućnost VOLI	Pot 6 Team (Hellenic Basketball Federation) Aris Betsson (Hellenic Basketball Federation) Panionios Cosmorama Travel
Pot 7 Team (Lithuanian Basketball Federation) Lietkabelis (Lithuanian Basketball Federation) Neptūnas	Pot 8 Team (Italian Basketball Federation) Dolomiti Energia Trento (Basketball Federation of Slovenia) Cedevita Olimpija
Pot 9 Team (German Basketball Federation) Veolia Towers Hamburg (German Basketball Federation) Niners Chemnitz	Pot 10 Team (British Basketball) London Lions (Polish Basketball Federation) Śląsk Wrocław

== Groups ==
=== Group A ===
Pos	Team	Pld	W	L	PF	PA	PD	Qualification
1	(Israeli Basketball Association) Hapoel Midtown Jerusalem	18	13	5	1702	1506	+196	Advance to quarterfinals
2	(Turkish Basketball Federation) Bahçeşehir Koleji	18	12 (Note: Bahçeşehir Koleji 159–135 Cedevita Olimpija)	6	1593	1475	+118	Advance to quarterfinals
3	(Basketball Federation of Slovenia) Cedevita Olimpija	18	12	6	1596	1413	+183	Advance to eighthfinals
4	(Italian Basketball Federation) Umana Reyer Venezia	18	11 (Note: Umana Reyer Venezia 188–168 Baxi Manresa)	7	1593	1538	+55	Advance to eighthfinals
5	(Spanish Basketball Federation) Baxi Manresa	18	11	7	1624	1619	+5	Advance to eighthfinals
6	(Romanian Basketball Federation) U-BT Cluj-Napoca	18	9	9	1714	1657	+57	Advance to eighthfinals
7	(Hellenic Basketball Federation) Aris Betsson	18	8	10	1500	1593	−93	
8	(Lithuanian Basketball Federation) Neptūnas	18	7	11	1637	1725	−88	
9	(Polish Basketball Federation) Śląsk Wrocław	18	5	13	1516	1680	−164	
10	(German Basketball Federation) Veolia Towers Hamburg	18	2	16	1472	1741	−269	

Source: EuroCup
Rules for classification: All points scored in extra period(s) will not be counted in the standings, nor for any tie-break situation.

==== Results ====
Home \ Away	ARI	BAH	MAN	COL	HAP	NEP	WRO	VEN	UBT	HAM
Aris Betsson (Hellenic Basketball Federation)	—	76–86	79–86	60–89	77–96	83–64	85–78	90–86	88–98	98–76
Bahçeşehir Koleji (Turkish Basketball Federation)	81–79	—	92–96	92–76	82–90	85–100	80–82	93–74	84–72	105–68
Baxi Manresa (Spanish Basketball Federation)	113–99	67–81	—	99–82	101–94	97–96	74–62	75–91	101–99	99–72
Cedevita Olimpija (Basketball Federation of Slovenia)	80–59	59–67	76–69	—	81–84	91–94	108–74	93–65	86–80	93–73
Hapoel Midtown Jerusalem (Israeli Basketball Association)	103–76	82–94	105–69	84–99	—	110–93	86–69	98–66	114–104	86–76
Neptūnas (Lithuanian Basketball Federation)	87–93	86–91	100–87	85–104	98–92	—	103–87	103–118	102–107	97–88
Śląsk Wrocław (Polish Basketball Federation)	107–113	99–91	90–96	81–114	72–115	95–85	—	92–104	94–93	92–81
Umana Reyer Venezia (Italian Basketball Federation)	81–85	94–85	97–93	86–84	83–80	89–69	103–76	—	90–83	90–55
U-BT Cluj-Napoca (Romania)	111–92	90–98	110–86	87–93	89–101	118–97	94–92	103–102	—	103–92
Veolia Towers Hamburg (German Basketball Federation)	89–92	85–106	94–116	74–88	85–100	94–98	99–96	95–87	76–95	—

Source: EuroCup
Legend: Blue = home team win; Red = away team win.
Matches with lighter background shading were decided after overtime.

=== Group B ===
Pos	Team	Pld	W	L	PF	PA	PD	Qualification
1	(Turkish Basketball Federation) Beşiktaş Gain	18	13 (Note: Beşiktaş Gain 193–159 Cosea JL Bourg)	5	1666	1489	+177	Advance to quarterfinals
2	(French Federation of Basketball) Cosea JL Bourg	18	13	5	1495	1383	+112	Advance to quarterfinals
3	(Basketball Federation of Montenegro) Budućnost VOLI	18	12 (Note: Budućnost VOLI 163–160 Türk Telekom)	6	1598	1461	+137	Advance to eighthfinals
4	(Turkish Basketball Federation) Türk Telekom	18	12	6	1562	1352	+210	Advance to eighthfinals
5	(Italian Basketball Federation) Dolomiti Energia Trento	18	11	7	1486	1513	−27	Advance to eighthfinals
6	(German Basketball Federation) Niners Chemnitz	18	9	9	1449	1458	−9	Advance to eighthfinals
7	(German Basketball Federation) ratiopharm Ulm	18	7	11	1470	1622	−152	
8	(British Basketball) London Lions	18	5 (Note: London Lions 132–127 Lietkabelis)	13	1335	1437	−102	
9	(Lithuanian Basketball Federation) Lietkabelis	18	5	13	1415	1502	−87	
10	(Hellenic Basketball Federation) Panionios Cosmorama Travel	18	3	15	1349	1608	−259	

Source: EuroCup
Rules for classification: All points scored in extra period(s) will not be counted in the standings, nor for any tie-break situation.

==== Results ====
Home \ Away	BES	BUD	BOU	TRE	LIE	LON	CHE	PAN	ULM	TTA
Beşiktaş Gain (Turkish Basketball Federation)	—	96–74	90–60	97–83	94–85	99–73	93–88	101–83	97–76	91–81
Budućnost VOLI (Basketball Federation of Montenegro)	82–79	—	96–84	96–107	95–81	94–63	97–81	91–63	101–71	91–81
Cosea JL Bourg (French Federation of Basketball)	99–103	88–73	—	73–91	93–65	86–85	85–82	81–79	97–66	88–80
Dolomiti Energia Trento (Italian Basketball Federation)	87–74	91–90	48–79	—	78–74	85–73	94–105	88–87	76–68	60–80
Lietkabelis (Lithuanian Basketball Federation)	85–79	91–98	73–86	93–94	—	61–74	79–85	89–62	94–98	74–100
London Lions (British Basketball)	98–96	59–86	68–72	87–71	58–66	—	70–78	97–72	72–73	77–89
Niners Chemnitz (German Basketball Federation)	97–95	71–84	88–82	81–67	86–67	67–68	—	73–68	89–78	63–87
Panionios Cosmorama Travel (Hellenic Basketball Federation)	74–114	97–85	56–66	87–91	72–79	79–78	89–86	—	69–94	61–106
ratiopharm Ulm (German Basketball Federation)	99–101	90–103	64–96	87–100	79–89	87–86	88–76	103–96	—	53–87
Türk Telekom (Turkish Basketball Federation)	84–93	79–72	76–80	92–86	85–75	88–63	79–62	95–67	93–96	—

Source: EuroCup
Legend: Blue = home team win; Red = away team win.
Matches with lighter background shading were decided after overtime.

== Matches ==
=== Gameday 1 ===
30 September 2025	Türk Telekom (Turkey)	93–96	(Germany) ratiopharm Ulm	Ankara Arena, Ankara
18:00	Scoring by quarter: 23–20, 16–28, 26–22, 28–26
	Pts: Usher 24; Rebs: Bankston 7 Asts: Smith 7 Eff: Bankston 24	Boxscore	Pts: 23 Smith; Rebs: 9 Osborne; Asts: 7 Smith; Eff: 27 Smith	Attendance: 4,732; Referees: Michele Rossi, Nick Van Den Broeck, Stefan Ćalić

30 September 2025	Śląsk Wrocław (Poland)	95–85	(Lithuania) Neptūnas	Centennial Hall, Wrocław
19:00	Scoring by quarter: 28–21, 19–24, 23–24, 25–16
	Pts: Gray 21; Rebs: Nizioł 9 Asts: Kirkwood 6 Eff: Nizioł 26	Boxscore	Pts: 16 Velička; Rebs: 6 Velička, Karnik; Asts: 10 Velička; Eff: 26 Velička	Attendance: 3,307; Referees: Amit Balak, Dragan Porobić, Noam Gordon

30 September 2025	Veolia Towers Hamburg (Germany)	85–100	(Israel) Hapoel Midtown Jerusalem	Inselpark Arena, Hamburg
19:30	Scoring by quarter: 26–32, 24–21, 18–21, 17–26
	Pts: Stewart, Reed 21; Rebs: Perrin 11; Asts: Tokoto 5 Eff: Stewart 21	Boxscore	Pts: 19 Carrington; Rebs: 11 Wiley; Asts: 5 Huber; Eff: 24 Smith	Attendance: 822; Referees: Ioannis Foufis, Denis Hadžić, Franko Gracin

30 September 2025	Umana Reyer Venezia (Italy)	81–85	(Greece) Aris Betsson	Palasport Taliercio, Venice
20:00	Scoring by quarter: 27–20, 22–29, 16–21, 16–15
	Pts: Bowman 14; Rebs: Horton 7 Asts: Valentine 6 Eff: Horton 22	Boxscore	Pts: 26 Jones; Rebs: 8 Jones; Asts: 6 Jones; Eff: 33 Jones	Attendance: 2,558; Referees: Carlos Cortés, Adar Peer, Arnau Padrós

1 October 2025	Lietkabelis (Lithuania)	85–79	(Turkey) Beşiktaş Gain	Kalnapilio Arena, Panevėžys
18:00	Scoring by quarter: 22–19, 13–24, 20–14, 30–22
	Pts: Kullamäe, Rubit 17; Rebs: Kullamäe, Danusevičius 7 Asts: Danusevičius 4 Eff: Rubit 22	Boxscore	Pts: 15 Mathews; Rebs: 5 Arslan; Asts: 4 Arslan, Brown; Eff: 15 Brown	Attendance: 1,533; Referees: Jakub Zamojski, Anne Panther, Christian Theis

1 October 2025	U-BT Cluj-Napoca (Romania)	90–98	(Turkey) Bahçeşehir Koleji	BTarena, Cluj-Napoca
18:00	Scoring by quarter: 22–25, 23–20, 26–25, 19–28
	Pts: Russell 21; Rebs: Miletić 7 Asts: Miletić, Taylor 5 Eff: Miletić 27	Boxscore	Pts: 24 Flynn; Rebs: 7 Flynn; Asts: 6 Sipahi; Eff: 32 Flynn	Attendance: 6,881; Referees: Luka Kardum, Marko Juras, Vassilis Pitsilkas

1 October 2025	Panionios Cosmorama Travel (Greece)	89–86(OT)	(Germany) Niners Chemnitz	National Athletic Center Makis Liougas, Glyfada
18:30	Scoring by quarter: 30–13, 19–32, 8–21, 20–11, Overtime: 12–9
	Pts: Lountzis 20; Rebs: Lountzis 9 Asts: Lountzis, Hands 6 Eff: Lountzis 33	Boxscore	Pts: 26 Davis Jr. Rebs: 11 Minchev; Asts: 4 Minchev; Eff: 24 Newman	Attendance: 1,583; Referees: Sašo Petek, Kerem Baki, Hüseyin Çelik

1 October 2025	Cedevita Olimpija (Slovenia)	76–69	(Spain) Baxi Manresa	Arena Stožice, Ljubljana
18:30	Scoring by quarter: 29–18, 13–9, 19–22, 15–20
	Pts: Nikolić 17; Rebs: Kennedy 11; Asts: Nikolić 6 Eff: Nikolić, Kennedy 19	Boxscore	Pts: 16 Reyes; Rebs: 9 Golden; Asts: 8 Benítez; Eff: 18 Golden	Attendance: 1,763; Referees: Joseph Bissang, Leandro Lezcano, Ioannis Tiganis

1 October 2025	Dolomiti Energia Trento (Italy)	48–79	(France) Cosea JL Bourg	BTS Arena, Trento
20:00	Scoring by quarter: 10–23, 20–17, 10–17, 8–22
	Pts: Steward 10; Rebs: Mawugbe 10; Asts: Jogėla 4 Eff: Mawugbe 13	Boxscore	Pts: 22 McGhee; Rebs: 9 Mokoka; Asts: 5 Mokoka; Eff: 21 Kokila	Attendance: 2,368; Referees: Uroš Obrknežević, Gentian Cici, Can Mavisu

2 October 2025	London Lions (United Kingdom)	59–86	(Montenegro) Budućnost VOLI	Copper Box, London
20:30	Scoring by quarter: 12–20, 13–26, 16–20, 18–20
	Pts: McGusty 13; Rebs: Williams 8 Asts: McGusty 5 Eff: McGusty 18	Boxscore	Pts: 13 Tanasković; Rebs: 10 Boutsiele; Asts: 3 Tres jugadores Eff: 19 Sulaimon	Attendance: 1,390; Referees: Hugues Thépénier, Mario Majkić, Sergio Manuel

=== Gameday 2 ===
7 October 2025	Neptūnas (Lithuania)	102–107	(Romania) U-BT Cluj-Napoca	Švyturio Arena, Klaipėda
18:00	Scoring by quarter: 28–19, 28–29, 22–29, 24–30
	Pts: Tarolis 21; Rebs: Pacevičius 7 Asts: Velička 7 Eff: Tarolis 28	Boxscore	Pts: 37 Russell; Rebs: 13 Mensah; Asts: 5 Russell; Eff: 38 Russell	Attendance: 2,087; Referees: Steve Bittner, Thomas Bissuel, Vasiliki Tsaroucha

7 October 2025	ratiopharm Ulm (Germany)	103–96	(Greece) Panionios Cosmorama Travel	Ratiopharm Arena, Ulm
19:00	Scoring by quarter: 28–22, 24–25, 25–24, 26–25
	Pts: Ledlum, Sengfelder 20; Rebs: Sengfelder 7 Asts: Smith 6 Eff: Sengfelder 22	Boxscore	Pts: 23 Hands; Rebs: 6 three players Asts: 11 Starks; Eff: 29 Hands	Attendance: 4,864; Referees: Marcin Kowalski, Maxime Boubert, Dragan Porobić

7 October 2025	Beşiktaş Gain (Turkey)	99–73	(United Kingdom) London Lions	BJK Akatlar Arena, Istanbul
19:00	Scoring by quarter: 26–15, 24–22, 24–16, 25–20
	Pts: Žižić 17; Rebs: Dotson 7 Asts: Dotson 5 Eff: Žižić 26	Boxscore	Pts: 14 Adamu; Rebs: 10 Williams; Asts: 5 McGusty; Eff: 22 Williams	Attendance: 1,450; Referees: Ioannis Foufis, Miloš Koljenšić, Nick Van den Broeck

8 October 2025	Bahçeşehir Koleji (Turkey)	93–74	(Italy) Umana Reyer Venezia	Sinan Erdem Dome, Istanbul
18:00	Scoring by quarter: 25–15, 21–28, 21–5, 26–26
	Pts: Flynn, Williams 16; Rebs: Williams 10; Asts: Flynn 8 Eff: Williams 21	Boxscore	Pts: 14 Cole; Rebs: 6 Tessitori, Horton; Asts: 6 Cole, Valentine; Eff: 18 Nikolić	Attendance: 2,202; Referees: Milivoje Jovčić, Kristaps Konstantinovs, Christian Theis

8 October 2025	Niners Chemnitz (Germany)	86–67	(Lithuania) Lietkabelis	Kalnapilio Arena, Panevėžys
19:00	Scoring by quarter: 28–17, 25–12, 18–17, 15–21
	Pts: Brewer 19; Rebs: Minchev 8 Asts: Davis Jr. 8 Eff: Yebo, Sibande 19	Boxscore	Pts: 13 Kullamäe; Rebs: 12 Danusevičius; Asts: 3 Radžius, Maldūnas; Eff: 15 Kullamäe	Attendance: 3,198; Referees: Igor Dragojević, Eduard Udyanskyy, Josip Radojković

8 October 2025	Aris Betsson (Greece)	98–76	(Germany) Veolia Towers Hamburg	Alexandreio Melathron, Thessaloniki
19:00	Scoring by quarter: 20–14, 25–14, 25–17, 28–31
	Pts: Jones 16; Rebs: Harrell 11; Asts: Jones 5 Eff: Mitrou-Long 18	Boxscore	Pts: 14 Perrin; Rebs: 14 Perrin; Asts: 6 Thorpe; Eff: 20 Perrin	Attendance: 5,138; Referees: Alberto Baena, Leandro Lezcano, Sergio Manuel

8 October 2025	Cosea JL Bourg (France)	88–80	(Turkey) Türk Telekom	Ekinox, Bourg-en-Bresse
19:30	Scoring by quarter: 31–17, 19–22, 10–24, 28–17
	Pts: McGhee, Gach 21; Rebs: McGhee 5 Asts: McGhee 7 Eff: McGhee 23	Boxscore	Pts: 27 Simonović; Rebs: 10 Simonović; Asts: 8 Özdemiroğlu; Eff: 33 Simonović	Referees: Tomasz Trawicki, Denis Hadžić, Marko Juras

8 October 2025	Hapoel Midtown Jerusalem (Israel)	84–99	(Slovenia) Cedevita Olimpija	Ranko Žeravica Sports Hall, Belgrade
20:00	Scoring by quarter: 29–29, 24–13, 13–30, 18–27
	Pts: Skapintsev 15; Rebs: Skapintsev 7 Asts: Winston 7 Eff: Skapintsev 24	Boxscore	Pts: 27 Stewart; Rebs: 8 Stewart; Asts: 6 Gibson; Eff: 41 Stewart	Attendance: 60; Referees: Jakub Zamojski, Piotr Pastusiak, Sergio Silva

8 October 2025	Budućnost VOLI (Montenegro)	96–107	(Italy) Dolomiti Energia Trento	Morača Sports Center, Podgorica
20:00	Scoring by quarter: 21–25, 35–28, 12–30, 28–24
	Pts: Mays 22; Rebs: Mays 8 Asts: Sulaimon, Ferrell 5 Eff: Mays 29	Boxscore	Pts: 24 Jones; Rebs: 8 Aldridge; Asts: 7 Jones; Eff: 29 Jones	Attendance: 2,628; Referees: Robert Vyklický, Artūras Šukys, Noam Gordon

8 October 2025	Baxi Manresa (Spain)	74–62	(Poland) Śląsk Wrocław	Nou Congost, Manresa
20:45	Scoring by quarter: 14–15, 22–13, 17–16, 21–18
	Pts: Golden 14; Rebs: Benítez 7 Asts: Benítez, Pérez 7 Eff: Golden 20	Boxscore	Pts: 9 three players Rebs: 7 Đorđević; Asts: 4 Kirkwood; Eff: 11 Kirkwood	Attendance: 3,260; Referees: Guido Giovannetti, Uroš Obrknežević, Sašo Petek

=== Gameday 3 ===
14 October 2025	Türk Telekom (Turkey)	79–72	(Montenegro) Budućnost VOLI	Ankara Arena, Ankara
18:00	Scoring by quarter: 26–15, 17–27, 16–16, 20–14
	Pts: Allman 16; Rebs: Alexander 7 Asts: Özdemiroğlu 6 Eff: Allman 19	Boxscore	Pts: 21 Mays; Rebs: 6 Morgan; Asts: 4 Ferrell; Eff: 25 Mays	Attendance: 4,683; Referees: Saulius Račys, Eduard Udyanskyy, Alberto Baena

14 October 2025	Cedevita Olimpija (Slovenia)	80–59	(Greece) Aris Betsson	Arena Stožice, Ljubljana
18:30	Scoring by quarter: 20–18, 24–17, 19–16, 17–8
	Pts: Gibson 19; Rebs: Stewart 7 Asts: Gibson, Blažič 5 Eff: Gibson 19	Boxscore	Pts: 19 Mitrou-Long; Rebs: 6 Mitrou-Long; Asts: 3 Jones; Eff: 23 Mitrou-Long	Attendance: 3,720; Referees: Jordi Aliaga, Gentian Cici, Kerem Baki

14 October 2025	Veolia Towers Hamburg (Germany)	85–106	(Turkey) Bahçeşehir Koleji	Inselpark Arena, Hamburg
19:30	Scoring by quarter: 16–18, 29–24, 13–29, 27–35
	Pts: Thorpe, Reed 17; Rebs: Perrin 7 Asts: Thorpe 4 Eff: Perrin 23	Boxscore	Pts: 21 Homesley, Flynn; Rebs: 7 Koprivica, Cavanaugh; Asts: 5 Cavanaugh, Williams; Eff: 26 Cavanaugh	Attendance: 1,439; Referees: Sašo Petek, Stefan Ćalić, Arnau Padrós

15 October 2025	Lietkabelis (Lithuania)	94–98	(Germany) ratiopharm Ulm	Kalnapilio Arena, Panevėžys
18:00	Scoring by quarter: 17–28, 25–33, 29–19, 23–18
	Pts: three players 18; Rebs: Danusevičius 10; Asts: Kullamäe 8 Eff: Rubit 21	Boxscore	Pts: 26 Ledlum; Rebs: 6 Jensen; Asts: 5 Ledlum; Eff: 29 Ledlum	Attendance: 1,654; Referees: Sérgio Silva, Hüseyin Çelik, Franko Gracin

15 October 2025	Panionios Cosmorama Travel (Greece)	56–66	(France) Cosea JL Bourg	National Athletic Center Makis Liougas, Glyfada
18:30	Scoring by quarter: 15–16, 10–18, 12–19, 19–13
	Pts: Tsalmpouris 11; Rebs: Watson 11; Asts: Starks 4 Eff: Watson 12	Boxscore	Pts: 17 McGhee; Rebs: 11 Kokila; Asts: 3 McGhee, McDowell-White; Eff: 20 Kokila	Attendance: 846; Referees: Amit Balak, Mario Majkić, Noam Gordon

15 October 2025	Beşiktaş Gain (Turkey)	93–88	(Germany) Niners Chemnitz	BJK Akatlar Arena, Istanbul
19:00	Scoring by quarter: 27–19, 28–28, 13–21, 25–20
	Pts: Arslan 19; Rebs: Žižić 7 Asts: Uğurlu 12; Eff: Uğurlu 24	Boxscore	Pts: 32 Yebo; Rebs: 11 Sibande; Asts: 11 Davis Jr. Eff: 32 Davis Jr.	Attendance: 1,496; Referees: Artūras Šukys, Hugues Thépénier, Dragan Porobić

15 October 2025	Śląsk Wrocław (Poland)	94–93	(Romania) U-BT Cluj-Napoca	Hala Orbita, Wrocław
19:00	Scoring by quarter: 22–24, 16–26, 32–23, 24–20
	Pts: Đorđević 19; Rebs: Đorđević 8 Asts: Gray, Niziol 6 Eff: Dordevic 27	Boxscore	Pts: 21 Russell; Rebs: 13 Miletić; Asts: 15 Russell; Eff: 30 Russell	Attendance: 2,417; Referees: Igor Dragojević, Nick Van den Broeck, Can Mavisu

15 October 2025	Umana Reyer Venezia (Italy)	89–69	(Lithuania) Neptūnas	Palasport Taliercio, Venice
20:00	Scoring by quarter: 27–10, 24–16, 23–21, 15–22
	Pts: Wheatle 13; Rebs: Horton 11; Asts: Cole 7 Eff: Horton 22	Boxscore	Pts: 13 Waterman; Rebs: 5 four players Asts: 9 Velička; Eff: 13 Velička, Waterman	Attendance: 2,226; Referees: Seffi Shemmesh, Josip Radojković, Ioannis Tiganis

15 October 2025	Baxi Manresa (Spain)	101–94	(Israel) Hapoel Midtown Jerusalem	Nou Congost, Manresa
20:45	Scoring by quarter: 20–24, 28–28, 21–19, 32–23
	Pts: Plummer 23; Rebs: Golden 8 Asts: Pérez 8 Eff: Plummer 23	Boxscore	Pts: 23 Smith; Rebs: 5 Smith, Lamb; Asts: 5 Harper; Eff: 27 Carrington	Attendance: 0 (Note: Match played behind closed doors.); Referees: Saša Pukl, Gytis Vilius, Vasiliki Tsaroucha

16 October 2025	London Lions (United Kingdom)	87–71	(Italy) Dolomiti Energia Trento	Copper Box, London
20:30	Scoring by quarter: 29–16, 26–8, 16–24, 16–23
	Pts: McGusty 22; Rebs: Williams 6 Asts: Phillip 7 Eff: Phillip 21	Boxscore	Pts: 22 Jones; Rebs: 6 Jakimovski, Bayehe; Asts: 5 Jogėla; Eff: 25 Jones	Attendance: 1,828; Referees: Kristaps Konstantinovs, Adar Peer, Vassilis Pitsilkas

=== Gameday 4 ===
21 October 2025	Neptūnas (Lithuania)	97–88	(Germany) Veolia Towers Hamburg	Švyturio Arena, Klaipėda
18:00	Scoring by quarter: 35–32, 22–15, 18–26, 22–15
	Pts: Tarolis 20; Rebs: Pacevičius 11; Asts: Velička 7 Eff: Pacevičius 21	Boxscore	Pts: 22 Thorpe; Rebs: 11 Perrin; Asts: 4 Thorpe; Eff: 24 Thorpe	Attendance: 1,794; Referees: Joseph Bissang, Marcin Kowalski, Noam Gordon

21 October 2025	ratiopharm Ulm (Germany)	99–101	(Turkey) Beşiktaş Gain	Ratiopharm Arena, Ulm
19:00	Scoring by quarter: 30–29, 24–25, 29–17, 16–30
	Pts: Ledlum 25; Rebs: Jensen 9 Asts: Weidemann, Ledlum 5 Eff: Ledlum 30	Boxscore	Pts: 19 Brown; Rebs: 8 Kamagate; Asts: 6 Uğurlu; Eff: 23 Kamagate	Attendance: 4,069; Referees: Saulius Račys, Amit Balak, Arnau Padrós

21 October 2025	Aris Betsson (Greece)	79–86	(Spain) Baxi Manresa	Alexandreio Melathron, Thessaloniki
19:00	Scoring by quarter: 18–27, 25–17, 21–22, 15–20
	Pts: Enoch 19; Rebs: Merkviladze 6 Asts: Bochoridis 7 Eff: Enoch 24	Boxscore	Pts: 20 Obasohan; Rebs: 9 Šteinbergs; Asts: 6 Pérez; Eff: 26 Obasohan	Attendance: 3,448; Referees: Borys Ryzhyk, Kristaps Konstantinovs, Stefan Ćalić

21 October 2025	Hapoel Midtown Jerusalem (Israel)	86–69	(Poland) Śląsk Wrocław	Ranko Žeravica Sports Hall, Belgrade
20:00	Scoring by quarter: 18–15, 31–13, 19–19, 18–22
	Pts: Harper 20; Rebs: Wiley 7 Asts: Harper 4 Eff: Harper 23	Boxscore	Pts: 15 Gray, Niziol; Rebs: 6 Đorđević; Asts: 4 Wiśniewski; Eff: 18 Gray, Niziol	Attendance: 44; Referees: Tomislav Hordov, Vassilis Pitsilkas, Franko Gracin

22 October 2025	U-BT Cluj-Napoca (Romania)	103–102(OT)	(Italy) Umana Reyer Venezia	BTarena, Cluj-Napoca
18:00	Scoring by quarter: 26–22, 30–22, 15–21, 18–24, Overtime: 14–13
	Pts: Molinar 22; Rebs: Miletić 13; Asts: Russell 6 Eff: Miletić 31	Boxscore	Pts: 20 Cole; Rebs: 11 Horton; Asts: 7 Cole; Eff: 25 Horton	Attendance: 7,962; Referees: Ioannis Foufis, Sergio Manuel, Hüseyin Çelik

22 October 2025	Bahçeşehir Koleji (Turkey)	92–76	(Slovenia) Cedevita Olimpija	Sinan Erdem Dome, Istanbul
18:00	Scoring by quarter: 27–14, 23–29, 22–16, 20–17
	Pts: Williams 18; Rebs: Williams 8 Asts: Homesley 6 Eff: Mitchell, Williams 20	Boxscore	Pts: 14 Nikolić, Škara; Rebs: 11 Blažič; Asts: 6 Gibson; Eff: 16 Nikolić, Škara	Attendance: 2,174; Referees: Carlos Cortés, Michele Rossi, Leandro Lezcano

22 October 2025	Budućnost VOLI (Montenegro)	91–63	(Greece) Panionios Cosmorama Travel	Morača Sports Center, Podgorica
19:00	Scoring by quarter: 28–13, 25–21, 20–10, 18–19
	Pts: Bouteille 16; Rebs: Tanasković 7 Asts: Sulaimon 7 Eff: Bouteille 20	Boxscore	Pts: 13 Lewis; Rebs: 4 Lountzis, Wahl; Asts: 4 Starks, Gkikas; Eff: 17 Lewis	Attendance: 2,100; Referees: Anne Panther, Adar Peer, Can Mavisu

22 October 2025	Niners Chemnitz (Germany)	67–68	(United Kingdom) London Lions	Chemnitz Arena, Chemnitz
19:00	Scoring by quarter: 16–22, 18–11, 13–21, 20–14
	Pts: Yebo 17; Rebs: Yebo 9 Asts: Davis Jr. 4 Eff: Yebo 22	Boxscore	Pts: 20 McGusty; Rebs: 7 Williams; Asts: 6 McGusty; Eff: 28 McGusty	Attendance: 3,394; Referees: Seffi Shemmesh, Denis Hadžić, Ioannis Tiganis

22 October 2025	Cosea JL Bourg (France)	93–65	(Lithuania) Lietkabelis	Ekinox, Bourg-en-Bresse
19:30	Scoring by quarter: 15–15, 32–16, 20–13, 26–21
	Pts: Labanca 18; Rebs: Lindo 9 Asts: McGhee 6 Eff: Mbaya 19	Boxscore	Pts: 16 Rubit; Rebs: 6 Tres jugadores Asts: 3 Bičkauskis; Eff: 15 Rubit	Attendance: 3,000; Referees: Milivoje Jovčić, Sašo Petek, Kerem Baki

22 October 2025	Dolomiti Energia Trento (Italy)	60–80	(Turkey) Türk Telekom	BTS Arena, Trento
20:00	Scoring by quarter: 22–16, 9–25, 19–17, 10–22
	Pts: Steward 11; Rebs: Jakimovski 9 Asts: Jones, Jogela 4 Eff: Aldridge 12	Boxscore	Pts: 14 Devoe; Rebs: 7 Usher; Asts: 6 Özdemiroğlu; Eff: 20 Usher	Attendance: 2,164; Referees: Miloš Koljenšić, Gentian Cici, Dragan Porobić

=== Gameday 5 ===
28 October 2025	Panionios Cosmorama Travel (Greece)	87–91	(Italy) Dolomiti Energia Trento	National Athletic Center Makis Liougas, Glyfada
18:30	Scoring by quarter: 19–17, 23–18, 30–28, 15–28
	Pts: Watson 20; Rebs: three players 6 Asts: Starks, Gkikas 6 Eff: Lewis 25	Boxscore	Pts: 20 Jones; Rebs: 7 Mawugbe; Asts: 4 Steward; Eff: 25 Jones	Attendance: 770; Referees: Rain Peerandi, Denis Hadžić, Hüseyin Çelik

28 October 2025	Veolia Towers Hamburg (Germany)	76–95	(Romania) U-BT Cluj-Napoca	Inselpark Arena, Hamburg
19:30	Scoring by quarter: 21–23, 9–29, 20–20, 26–23
	Pts: Thorpe 18; Rebs: Perrin 7 Asts: Thorpe 6 Eff: Perrin 25	Boxscore	Pts: 26 Russell; Rebs: 7 Mensah; Asts: 5 Richard; Eff: 23 Russell	Attendance: 1,940; Referees: Miloš Koljenšić, Vassilis Pitsilkas, Ioannis Tiganis

28 October 2025	Hapoel Midtown Jerusalem (Israel)	103–76	(Greece) Aris Betsson	Ranko Žeravica Sports Hall, Belgrade
20:00	Scoring by quarter: 23–21, 27–27, 31–20, 22–8
	Pts: three players 18; Rebs: Wiley 6 Asts: Harper 9 Eff: Harper 36	Boxscore	Pts: 18 Jones; Rebs: 8 Enoch; Asts: 5 Mitrou-Long; Eff: 18 Jones	Attendance: 55; Referees: Robert Vyklický, Sašo Petek, Christian Theis

29 October 2025	Beşiktaş Gain (Turkey)	90–60	(France) Cosea JL Bourg	BJK Akatlar Arena, Istanbul
17:00	Scoring by quarter: 26–13, 29–14, 11–19, 24–14
	Pts: Dotson, Arslan 16; Rebs: Žižić 14; Asts: Dotson 6 Eff: Žižić 30	Boxscore	Pts: 11 Lindo; Rebs: 7 McDowell-White; Asts: 3 Lindo, Mokoka; Eff: 8 McDowell-White, Lindo	Attendance: 2,172; Referees: Robert Lottermoser, Gentian Cici, Stefan Ćalić

29 October 2025	Lietkabelis (Lithuania)	91–98	(Montenegro) Budućnost VOLI	Kalnapilio Arena, Panevėžys
18:00	Scoring by quarter: 28–27, 22–32, 22–18, 19–21
	Pts: Flowers 20; Rebs: Mutic, Danusevičius 5 Asts: Morris 6 Eff: Rubit, Flowers 21	Boxscore	Pts: 17 Morgan; Rebs: 8 Boutsiele; Asts: 8 Ferrell; Eff: 30 Morgan	Attendance: 1,834; Referees: Amit Balak, Mario Majkić, Nick Van den Broeck

29 October 2025	Niners Chemnitz (Germany)	89–78	(Germany) ratiopharm Ulm	Chemnitz Arena, Chemnitz
19:00	Scoring by quarter: 26–20, 22–15, 12–27, 29–16
	Pts: Yebo 25; Rebs: Yebo 9 Asts: Kajami-Keane 9 Eff: Davis Jr. 32	Boxscore	Pts: 16 three players Rebs: 14 Osborne; Asts: 4 Jensen; Eff: 29 Osborne	Attendance: 3,304; Referees: Emin Moğulkoç, Adar Peer, Kerem Baki

29 October 2025	Śląsk Wrocław (Poland)	92–104	(Italy) Umana Reyer Venezia	Centennial Hall, Wrocław
19:00	Scoring by quarter: 26–26, 18–21, 27–22, 21–35
	Pts: Kirkwood, Penava 22; Rebs: Penava 6 Asts: three players 5 Eff: Penava 24	Boxscore	Pts: 18 Valentine; Rebs: 5 Tessitori, Horton; Asts: 6 Cole; Eff: 19 Tessitori, Cole	Attendance: 2,307; Referees: Hugues Thépénier, Dragan Porobić, Noam Gordon

29 October 2025	Cedevita Olimpija (Slovenia)	91–94	(Lithuania) Neptūnas	Arena Stožice, Ljubljana
19:30	Scoring by quarter: 16–34, 26–15, 25–21, 24–24
	Pts: Nikolić 19; Rebs: Steward 6 Asts: Gibson 8 Eff: Nikolić 28	Boxscore	Pts: 25 Lomažs; Rebs: 8 Karnik; Asts: 8 Velička; Eff: 28 Karnik	Attendance: 3,580; Referees: Kristaps Konstantinovs, Maxime Boubert, Can Mavisu

29 October 2025	London Lions (United Kingdom)	77–89	(Turkey) Türk Telekom	Copper Box, London
20:30	Scoring by quarter: 16–14, 26–31, 18–27, 17–17
	Pts: Scott, McGusty 16; Rebs: Rai 9 Asts: Phillip 4 Eff: Scott, McGusty 17	Boxscore	Pts: 22 Allman; Rebs: 10 Alexander; Asts: 6 Allman; Eff: 34 Allman	Attendance: 2,958; Referees: Michele Rossi, Leandro Lezcano, Franko Gracin

29 October 2025	Baxi Manresa (Spain)	67–81	(Turkey) Bahçeşehir Koleji	Nou Congost, Manresa
20:45	Scoring by quarter: 13–26, 19–18, 12–17, 23–20
	Pts: Ubal 15; Rebs: Ubal 5 Asts: Golden, Pérez 4 Eff: Ubal 21	Boxscore	Pts: 17 Hale; Rebs: 5 three players Asts: 5 Flynn; Eff: 20 Flynn	Attendance: 3,731; Referees: Uroš Obrknežević, Thomas Bissuel, Steve Bittner

=== Gameday 6 ===
4 November 2025	Türk Telekom (Turkey)	95–67	(Greece) Panionios Cosmorama Travel	Ankara Arena
17:00	Scoring by quarter: 24–23, 20–14, 32–9, 19–21
	Pts: Smith 20; Rebs: Devoe, Kahraman 6 Asts: Devoe 7 Eff: Devoe 26	Boxscore	Pts: 17 DeShields; Rebs: 4 Oikonomopoulos, Gontikas; Asts: 4 Gkikas; Eff: 14 DeShields	Attendance: 4,617; Referees: Saša Pukl, Uroš Obrknežević, Mario Majkić

4 November 2025	Budućnost VOLI (Montenegro)	82–79	(Turkey) Beşiktaş Gain	Morača Sports Center, Podgorica
19:00	Scoring by quarter: 21–26, 26–19, 23–16, 12–18
	Pts: Sulaimon 20; Rebs: Morgan 6 Asts: four players 2 Eff: Morgan 22	Boxscore	Pts: 15 A. Brown; Rebs: 7 A. Brown; Asts: 4 Žižić; Eff: 17 Dotson, V. Brown	Attendance: 3,200; Referees: Joseph Bissang, Leandro Lezcano, Christian Theis

4 November 2025	Cosea JL Bourg (France)	85–82	(Germany) Niners Chemnitz	Ekinox, Bourg-en-Bresse
19:30	Scoring by quarter: 16–18, 20–23, 22–24, 27–17
	Pts: Gach 18; Rebs: Kokila 11; Asts: McDowell-White 6 Eff: Gach 24	Boxscore	Pts: 25 Davis Jr. Rebs: 6 Kajami-Keane; Asts: 7 Kajami-Keane; Eff: 21 Davis Jr.	Attendance: 3,000; Referees: Luka Kardum, Vassilis Pitsilkas, Can Mavisu

4 November 2025	Dolomiti Energia Trento (Italy)	78–74	(Lithuania) Lietkabelis	BTS Arena, Trento
20:00	Scoring by quarter: 22–15, 20–16, 20–27, 16–16
	Pts: Jones 21; Rebs: Aldridge 10; Asts: Jones, Aldridge 4 Eff: Jones 31	Boxscore	Pts: 22 Flowers; Rebs: 6 Rubit; Asts: 7 Flowers; Eff: 29 Flowers	Attendance: 1,981; Referees: Steve Bittner, Noam Gordon, Franko Gracin

5 November 2025	U-BT Cluj-Napoca (Romania)	87–93	(Slovenia) Cedevita Olimpija	BTarena, Cluj-Napoca
18:00	Scoring by quarter: 22–15, 17–29, 28–25, 20–24
	Pts: Russell 21; Rebs: Mensah 9 Asts: Russell 7 Eff: Russell 25	Boxscore	Pts: 17 Stewart; Rebs: 8 Kennedy; Asts: 7 Gibson; Eff: 20 Gibson	Attendance: 6,631; Referees: Gytis Vilius, Amit Balak, Arnau Padrós

5 November 2025	Neptūnas (Lithuania)	100–87	(Spain) Baxi Manresa	Švyturio Arena, Klaipėda
18:00	Scoring by quarter: 27–17, 31–27, 22–20, 20–23
	Pts: Karnik 25; Rebs: Karnik 13; Asts: Velička 14; Eff: Karnik 37	Boxscore	Pts: 18 Obasohan; Rebs: 8 Golden; Asts: 10 Benítez; Eff: 20 Benítez	Attendance: 2,135; Referees: Robert Vyklický, Anne Panther, Ioannis Tiganis

5 November 2025	Bahçeşehir Koleji (Turkey)	82–90	(Israel) Hapoel Midtown Jerusalem	Aleksandar Nikolic Hall, Belgrade (Note: The match was held in Belgrade after consideration by the relevant authorities.)
18:00	Scoring by quarter: 22–27, 19–21, 15–18, 26–24
	Pts: Flynn 28; Rebs: Williams 11; Asts: Flynn 5 Eff: Flynn 32	Boxscore	Pts: 27 Harper; Rebs: 10 Wiley; Asts: 6 Winston; Eff: 37 Harper	Attendance: 50; Referees: Emilio Pérez, Igor Dragojević, Gentian Cici

5 November 2025	ratiopharm Ulm (Germany)	87–86	(United Kingdom) London Lions	Ratiopharm Arena, Ulm
19:00	Scoring by quarter: 23–23, 18–11, 19–22, 27–30
	Pts: Weidemann 17; Rebs: Osborne 5 Asts: three players 3 Eff: Schoormann 24	Boxscore	Pts: 23 Phillip; Rebs: 8 Williams; Asts: 4 Williams; Eff: 23 Phillip	Attendance: 5,088; Referees: Hugues Thépénier, Sergio Manuel, Hüseyin Çelik

5 November 2025	Aris Betsson (Greece)	85–78	(Poland) Śląsk Wrocław	Alexandreio Melathron, Thessaloniki
19:00	Scoring by quarter: 21–6, 29–24, 17–14, 18–34
	Pts: Jones 28; Rebs: Kulboka 7 Asts: Mitrou-Long, Jones 5 Eff: Jones 37	Boxscore	Pts: 20 Sanon; Rebs: 11 Urbaniak; Asts: 5 Gray; Eff: 20 Sanon	Attendance: 2,295; Referees: Eduard Udyanskyy, Adar Peer, Kerem Baki

5 November 2025	Umana Reyer Venezia (Italy)	90–55	(Germany) Veolia Towers Hamburg	Palasport Taliercio, Venice
20:00	Scoring by quarter: 22–18, 25–7, 20–13, 23–17
	Pts: Nikolić, Wiltjer 12; Rebs: Tessitori 10; Asts: Valentine 6 Eff: Horton 19	Boxscore	Pts: 17 Stewart; Rebs: 7 Perrin; Asts: 2 Breunig; Eff: 14 Stewart	Attendance: 2,223; Referees: Sašo Petek, Josip Radojković, Nick Van den Broeck

=== Gameday 7 ===
11 November 2025	ratiopharm Ulm (Germany)	64–96	(France) Cosea JL Bourg	Ratiopharm Arena, Ulm
19:00	Scoring by quarter: 17–28, 25–22, 5–14, 17–32
	Pts: Sengfelder 15; Rebs: Jensen, Smith 4 Asts: Smith, Miličić 5 Eff: Sengfelder 15	Boxscore	Pts: 23 Mokoka; Rebs: 6 Gach, Mbaya; Asts: 8 McGhee; Eff: 32 Mokoka	Attendance: 2,486; Referees: Saša Pukl, Sašo Petek, Nick Van den Broeck

11 November 2025	Aris Betsson (Greece)	76–86	(Turkey) Bahçeşehir Koleji	Alexandreio Melathron, Thessaloniki
19:00	Scoring by quarter: 23–16, 16–22, 20–19, 17–29
	Pts: Jones 16; Rebs: Kulboka 7 Asts: Jones 5 Eff: three players 10	Boxscore	Pts: 16 Mitchell; Rebs: 8 Cavanaugh; Asts: 4 three players Eff: 17 Flynn, Ponitka	Attendance: 3,351; Referees: Mehdi Difallah, Tomasz Trawicki, Amit Balak

11 November 2025	Śląsk Wrocław (Poland)	92–81	(Germany) Veolia Towers Hamburg	Centennial Hall, Wrocław
19:00	Scoring by quarter: 22–23, 27–23, 20–19, 23–16
	Pts: Sanon 19; Rebs: Kirkwood, Đorđević 6 Asts: Kirkwood 9 Eff: Sanon, Đorđević 21	Boxscore	Pts: 19 Perrin; Rebs: 6 four players Asts: 10 Thorpe; Eff: 20 Perrin	Attendance: 2,379; Referees: Rain Peerandi, Maxime Boubert, Hüseyin Çelik

11 November 2025	Hapoel Midtown Jerusalem (Israel)	110–93	(Lithuania) Neptūnas	Ranko Žeravica Sports Hall, Belgrade
20:30	Scoring by quarter: 29–28, 25–28, 28–27, 28–10
	Pts: Winston 35; Rebs: Wiley 9 Asts: Harper 8 Eff: Winston 37	Boxscore	Pts: 18 Waterman; Rebs: 8 Lomažs; Asts: 7 Lomažs; Eff: 21 Beručka	Attendance: 25; Referees: Uroš Obrknežević, Josip Radojković, Stefan Ćalić

12 November 2025	Beşiktaş Gain (Turkey)	97–83	(Italy) Dolomiti Energia Trento	BJK Akatlar Arena, Istanbul
18:00	Scoring by quarter: 24–31, 21–19, 31–13, 21–20
	Pts: Lemar 23; Rebs: Žižić 11; Asts: Dotson 8 Eff: Morgan 27	Boxscore	Pts: 16 Battle; Rebs: 6 Mawugbe, Jakimovski; Asts: 9 Steward; Eff: 16 Mawugbe	Attendance: 2,020; Referees: Igor Dragojević, Jordi Aliaga, Sergio Manuel

12 November 2025	U-BT Cluj-Napoca (Romania)	110–86	(Spain) Baxi Manresa	Nova PG Arena, Cluj-Napoca
18:00	Scoring by quarter: 30–24, 27–17, 25–26, 28–19
	Pts: Woodbury 26; Rebs: Miletić 12; Asts: Russell 8 Eff: Miletić, Woodbury 26	Boxscore	Pts: 17 Plummer; Rebs: 6 Benítez, Golden; Asts: 11 Benítez; Eff: 23 Plummer	Attendance: 2,973; Referees: Borys Ryzhyk, Vasiliki Tsaroucha, Noam Gordon

12 November 2025	Cedevita Olimpija (Slovenia)	93–65	(Italy) Umana Reyer Venezia	Arena Stožice, Ljubljana
18:30	Scoring by quarter: 19–13, 23–24, 27–14, 24–14
	Pts: Gibson 15; Rebs: Kennedy 8 Asts: Nikolić 6 Eff: Kennedy 23	Boxscore	Pts: 13 Nikolić; Rebs: 7 Horton; Asts: 5 Bowman; Eff: 13 Nikolić	Attendance: 3,875; Referees: Anne Panther, Adar Peer, Christian Theis

12 November 2025	Lietkabelis (Lithuania)	74–100	(Turkey) Türk Telekom	Kalnapilio Arena, Panevėžys
18:45	Scoring by quarter: 21–27, 21–26, 16–22, 16–25
	Pts: Rubit 20; Rebs: Kullamäe 6 Asts: Flowers 6 Eff: Rubit 26	Boxscore	Pts: 19 Usher, Özdemiroğlu; Rebs: 5 three players Asts: 8 Devoe; Eff: 26 Özdemiroğlu	Attendance: 1,685; Referees: Emilio Pérez, Denis Hadžić, Dragan Porobić

12 November 2025	Niners Chemnitz (Germany)	71–84	(Montenegro) Budućnost VOLI	Chemnitz Arena, Chemnitz
19:00	Scoring by quarter: 19–21, 20–16, 17–19, 15–28
	Pts: Yebo 20; Rebs: Yebo 7 Asts: Kajami-Keane 4 Eff: Yebo 20	Boxscore	Pts: 26 Bouteille; Rebs: 9 Bouteille; Asts: 4 Sulaimon; Eff: 34 Morgan, Bouteille	Attendance: 3,155; Referees: Marcin Kowalski, Guido Giovannetti, Franko Gracin

12 November 2025	London Lions (United Kingdom)	97–72	(Greece) Panionios Cosmorama Travel	Copper Box, London
20:30	Scoring by quarter: 24–18, 31–17, 24–13, 18–24
	Pts: Scott 18; Rebs: Scott, Price 6 Asts: Rai, McGusty 5 Eff: Scott 25	Boxscore	Pts: 17 DeShields; Rebs: 6 Watson; Asts: 5 DeShields; Eff: 17 DeShields	Attendance: 2,171; Referees: Sérgio Silva, Steve Bittner, Can Mavisu

=== Gameday 8 ===
18 November 2025	U-BT Cluj-Napoca (Romania)	89–101	(Israel) Hapoel Midtown Jerusalem	BTarena, Cluj-Napoca
18:00	Scoring by quarter: 21–38, 22–20, 32–18, 14–25
	Pts: Creek 26; Rebs: Russell, Richard 3 Asts: Russell 6 Eff: Creek 35	Boxscore	Pts: 17 Lamb; Rebs: 11 Wiley; Asts: 5 Harper, Winston; Eff: 24 Wiley	Attendance: 5,327; Referees: Milivoje Jovčić, Thomas Bissuel, Sergio Manuel

18 November 2025	Neptūnas (Lithuania)	87–93	(Greece) Aris Betsson	Švyturio Arena, Klaipėda
18:00	Scoring by quarter: 28–21, 18–29, 18–23, 23–20
	Pts: Lomažs 26; Rebs: Velička 5 Asts: Lomažs 7 Eff: Lomažs 28	Boxscore	Pts: 24 Noua; Rebs: 8 Jones, Noua; Asts: 7 Jones; Eff: 32 Noua	Attendance: 2,284; Referees: Guido Giovannetti, Igor Dragojević, Marko Juras

18 November 2025	Budućnost VOLI (Montenegro)	101–71	(Germany) ratiopharm Ulm	Morača Sports Center, Podgorica
19:00	Scoring by quarter: 26–21, 27–23, 26–7, 22–20
	Pts: Sulaimon 19; Rebs: Tanasković 7 Asts: Mays, Kovliar 4 Eff: Mays, Tanasković 21	Boxscore	Pts: 15 Jensen; Rebs: 5 Osborne; Asts: 11 Jensen; Eff: 27 Jensen	Attendance: 1,890; Referees: Gytis Vilius, Robert Vyklický, Mario Majkić

18 November 2025	Śląsk Wrocław (Poland)	99–91	(Turkey) Bahçeşehir Koleji	Centennial Hall, Wrocław
19:00	Scoring by quarter: 20–30, 24–17, 20–20, 35–24
	Pts: Kirkwood 21; Rebs: Urbaniak 6 Asts: Niziol 8 Eff: Đorđević 19	Boxscore	Pts: 20 Homesley; Rebs: 6 Koprivica, Williams; Asts: 4 Sipahi; Eff: 23 Homesley	Attendance: 2,507; Referees: Leandro Lezcano, Stefan Ćalić, Arnau Padrós

18 November 2025	Dolomiti Energia Trento (Italy)	94–105	(Germany) Niners Chemnitz	BTS Arena, Trento
20:00	Scoring by quarter: 20–19, 17–34, 26–23, 31–29
	Pts: Jakimovski 30; Rebs: Aldridge 9 Asts: Jones 5 Eff: Jakimovski 31	Boxscore	Pts: 33 Yebo; Rebs: 8 Yebo; Asts: 5 Davis Jr. Eff: 38 Yebo	Attendance: 2,272; Referees: Joseph Bissang, Vasiliki Tsaroucha, Denis Hadžić

19 November 2025	Türk Telekom (Turkey)	84–93	(Turkey) Beşiktaş Gain	Ankara Arena, Ankara
17:00	Scoring by quarter: 20–29, 19–21, 22–21, 23–22
	Pts: Alexander, Smith 15; Rebs: Alexander 7 Asts: Smith 7 Eff: Alexander 24	Boxscore	Pts: 20 Dotson; Rebs: 7 Kamagate; Asts: 5 Morgan; Eff: 26 Dotson	Attendance: 9,984; Referees: Miguel Ángel Pérez, Steve Bittner, Nick Van den Broeck

19 November 2025	Panionios Cosmorama Travel (Greece)	72–79	(Lithuania) Lietkabelis	National Athletic Center Makis Liougas, Glyfada
18:30	Scoring by quarter: 12–16, 19–19, 21–20, 20–24
	Pts: Lemon 20; Rebs: Watson 8 Asts: Starks 6 Eff: Lewis 20	Boxscore	Pts: 16 Morris; Rebs: 8 Rubit; Asts: 3 Flowers, Danusevičius; Eff: 20 Rubit	Attendance: 506; Referees: Josip Radojković, Hüseyin Çelik, Adar Peer

19 November 2025	Cedevita Olimpija (Slovenia)	93–73	(Germany) Veolia Towers Hamburg	Arena Stožice, Ljubljana
18:30	Scoring by quarter: 21–16, 27–19, 20–20, 25–18
	Pts: Stewart Jr. 17; Rebs: Kennedy 10; Asts: Gibson 6 Eff: Stewart, Kennedy 19	Boxscore	Pts: 19 Daniels IV; Rebs: 6 Perrin; Asts: 5 Daniels IV; Eff: 20 Daniels IV	Attendance: 1,911; Referees: Sérgio Silva, Noam Gordon, Can Mavisu

19 November 2025	Umana Reyer Venezia (Italy)	97–93	(Spain) Baxi Manresa	Palasport Taliercio, Venice
20:00	Scoring by quarter: 27–29, 27–16, 18–24, 25–24
	Pts: Wiltjer 20; Rebs: Horton 7 Asts: Valentine 6 Eff: Wiltjer 18	Boxscore	Pts: 21 Plummer; Rebs: 8 Olinde, Pérez; Asts: 8 Pérez; Eff: 17 Golden	Attendance: 2,315; Referees: Sreten Radović, Gentian Cici, Franko Gracin

19 November 2025	London Lions (United Kingdom)	68–72	(France) Cosea JL Bourg	Copper Box, London
20:30	Scoring by quarter: 15–21, 24–19, 13–13, 16–19
	Pts: Scott 23; Rebs: Scott 7 Asts: Phillip 5 Eff: Scott 32	Boxscore	Pts: 14 McGhee; Rebs: 7 Mokoka; Asts: 6 McGhee; Eff: 14 McGhee, Mitchell	Attendance: 1,645; Referees: Alberto Baena, Manuel Attard, Christian Theis

=== Gameday 9 ===
4 December 2025	Bahçeşehir Koleji (Turkey)	85–100	(Lithuania) Neptūnas	Sinan Erdem Dome, Istanbul
17:00	Scoring by quarter: 18–32, 18–20, 18–31, 31–17
	Pts: Koprivica, Ponitka 13; Rebs: Williams 9 Asts: Sipahi 4 Eff: Koprivica 24	Boxscore	Pts: 18 Velička; Rebs: 8 Waterman, Mockevičius; Asts: 6 Velička; Eff: 19 Velička	Attendance: 1,174; Referees: Jakub Zamojski, Robert Vyklický, Gentian Cici

4 December 2025	Cedevita Olimpija (Slovenia)	108–74	(Poland) Śląsk Wrocław	Arena Stožice, Ljubljana
18:30	Scoring by quarter: 24–19, 37–23, 24–19, 23–13
	Pts: Gibson 19; Rebs: McNair Jr. 5 Asts: Gibson 8 Eff: Gibson 24	Boxscore	Pts: 14 Kirkwood; Rebs: 6 Đorđević; Asts: 9 Kirkwood; Eff: 28 Kirkwood	Attendance: 2,822; Referees: Ioannis Foufis, Anne Panther, Christian Theis

4 December 2025	ratiopharm Ulm (Germany)	87–100	(Italy) Dolomiti Energia Trento	Ratiopharm Arena
19:00	Scoring by quarter: 22–24, 24–21, 18–28, 23–27
	Pts: Weidemann 21; Rebs: Osborne 7 Asts: Weidemann, Jensen 4 Eff: Smith 20	Boxscore	Pts: 19 Jones, Bayehe; Rebs: 9 Jakimovski; Asts: 4 Steward, Jones; Eff: 27 Jones	Attendance: 5,200; Referees: Damir Javor, Amit Balak, Sašo Petek

4 December 2025	Niners Chemnitz (Germany)	63–87	(Turkey) Türk Telekom	Chemnitz Arena, Chemnitz
19:00	Scoring by quarter: 14–20, 24–25, 10–20, 15–22
	Pts: Yebo, Sow 16; Rebs: Yebo 6 Asts: Kajami-Keane 4 Eff: Sow 20	Boxscore	Pts: 17 Smith; Rebs: 8 Alexander; Asts: 7 Devoe; Eff: 20 Bankston	Attendance: 3,285; Referees: Igor Dragojević, Leandro Lezcano, Ioannis Tiganis

4 December 2025	Lietkabelis (Lithuania)	61–74	(United Kingdom) London Lions	Kalnapilio Arena, Panevėžys
19:00	Scoring by quarter: 17–16, 10–20, 22–25, 12–13
	Pts: Morris 22; Rebs: Aimaq 9 Asts: four players 2 Eff: Morris 16	Boxscore	Pts: 15 Phillip, Williams; Rebs: 12 Phillip; Asts: 7 Phillip; Eff: 32 Phillip	Attendance: 1,517; Referees: Michele Rossi, Kerem Baki, Marko Juras

4 December 2025	Aris Betsson (Greece)	88–98	(Romania) U-BT Cluj-Napoca	Alexandreio Melathron, Thessaloniki
19:00	Scoring by quarter: 21–17, 20–21, 17–22, 30–38
	Pts: Noua, Anđušić 20; Rebs: Harrell 6 Asts: Jones 6 Eff: Noua 23	Boxscore	Pts: 27 Creek; Rebs: 6 Creek; Asts: 8 Molinar; Eff: 35 Creek	Attendance: 3,642; Referees: Juan Carlos García, Tomasz Trawicki, Mario Majkić

4 December 2025	Hapoel Midtown Jerusalem (Israel)	98–66	(Italy) Umana Reyer Venezia	Ranko Žeravica Sports Hall, Belgrade
20:00	Scoring by quarter: 21–16, 26–14, 20–18, 31–22
	Pts: Harper 18; Rebs: Lamb 10; Asts: Harper 9 Eff: Harper 27	Boxscore	Pts: 12 Cole; Rebs: 5 Horton; Asts: 6 Candi; Eff: 13 Candi	Attendance: 19; Referees: Miloš Koljenšić, Maxime Boubert, Denis Hadžić

5 December 2025	Beşiktaş Gain (Turkey)	101–83	(Greece) Panionios Cosmorama Travel	Basketbol Gelişim Merkezi, Istanbul
18:00	Scoring by quarter: 27–20, 28–26, 18–24, 28–13
	Pts: Žižić 18; Rebs: Žižić 13; Asts: Uğurlu 7 Eff: Žižić 36	Boxscore	Pts: 20 Tsalmpouris; Rebs: 7 Tsalmpouris; Asts: 7 Starks; Eff: 29 Tsalmpouris	Attendance: 9,000; Referees: Alberto Baena, Kristaps Konstantinovs, Stefan Ćalić

5 December 2025	Cosea JL Bourg (France)	88–73	(Montenegro) Budućnost VOLI	Ekinox, Bourg-en-Bresse
19:30	Scoring by quarter: 19–21, 26–14, 25–23, 18–15
	Pts: Gach 22; Rebs: McGhee, Kokila 6 Asts: McGhee 7 Eff: Gach 30	Boxscore	Pts: 18 Ferrell; Rebs: 5 three players Asts: 4 Ferrell; Eff: 25 Ferrell	Attendance: 3,400; Referees: Seffi Shemmesh, Arnau Padrós, Nick Van den Broeck

5 December 2025	Baxi Manresa (Spain)	99–72	(Germany) Veolia Towers Hamburg	Nou Congost, Manresa
20:45	Scoring by quarter: 19–20, 31–19, 28–19, 21–14
	Pts: Benítez 17; Rebs: Reyes 10; Asts: Benítez 10; Eff: Benítez 27	Boxscore	Pts: 20 Perrin; Rebs: 5 Perrin; Asts: 8 Thorpe; Eff: 25 Perrin	Attendance: 4,417; Referees: Eduard Udyanskyy, Uros Obrknezevic, Manuel Attard

=== Gameday 10 ===
9 December 2025	Beşiktaş Gain (Turkey)	94–85(OT)	(Lithuania) Lietkabelis	BJK Akatlar Arena, Istanbul
18:00	Scoring by quarter: 27–19, 20–19, 17–27, 16–15, Overtime: 14–5
	Pts: Žižić 16; Rebs: Žižić 7 Asts: Dotson 6 Eff: Žižić 25	Boxscore	Pts: 27 Flowers; Rebs: 7 Flowers; Asts: 3 Kullamäe; Eff: 35 Flowers	Attendance: 2,400; Referees: Hugues Thépénier, Vasiliki Tsaroucha, Christian Theis

9 December 2025	Hapoel Midtown Jerusalem (Israel)	86–76	(Germany) Veolia Towers Hamburg	Holon Toto Hall, Holon
19:00	Scoring by quarter: 27–21, 21–19, 16–17, 22–19
	Pts: Winston 21; Rebs: Skapintsev 12; Asts: Harper 3 Eff: Harper 25	Boxscore	Pts: 16 Daniels IV, Perrin; Rebs: 8 Perrin; Asts: 6 Thorpe; Eff: 21 Perrin	Attendance: 2,200; Referees: Marcin Kowalski, Sergio Manuel, Kerem Baki

9 December 2025	Niners Chemnitz (Germany)	73–68	(Greece) Panionios Cosmorama Travel	Chemnitz Arena, Chemnitz
19:00	Scoring by quarter: 20–18, 17–22, 16–24, 20–4
	Pts: Sow 19; Rebs: Sow 10; Asts: Davis Jr. 5 Eff: Sow 23	Boxscore	Pts: 19 Hands; Rebs: 6 Lemon, Kreuser; Asts: 3 three players Eff: 20 Hands	Attendance: 2,975; Referees: Uroš Obrknežević, Hüseyin Çelik, Manuel Attard

9 December 2025	Cose JL Bourg (France)	73–91	(Italy) Dolomiti Energia Trento	Ekinox, Bourg-en-Bresse
19:30	Scoring by quarter: 23–19, 12–27, 22–15, 16–30
	Pts: Gach 20; Rebs: McGhee 7 Asts: McGhee 5 Eff: Gach 22	Boxscore	Pts: 30 Jakimovski; Rebs: 9 Aldridge; Asts: 5 Jones; Eff: 43 Jakimovski	Attendance: 2,800; Referees: Luka Kardum, Adar Peer, Denis Hadžić

10 December 2025	Bahçeşehir Koleji (Turkey)	84–72	(Romania) U-BT Cluj-Napoca	Sinan Erdem Dome, Istanbul
17:00	Scoring by quarter: 22–20, 17–18, 17–24, 28–10
	Pts: Williams 22; Rebs: Williams 15; Asts: Flynn, Ponitka 6 Eff: Williams 28	Boxscore	Pts: 12 Creek; Rebs: 11 Ceaser; Asts: 5 Molinar; Eff: 19 Ceaser	Attendance: 714; Referees: Carlos Cortés, Sérgio Silva, Arnau Padrós

10 December 2025	Neptūnas (Lithuania)	103–87(OT)	(Poland) Śląsk Wrocław	Švyturio Arena, Klaipėda
18:00	Scoring by quarter: 16–30, 24–16, 24–19, 19–8, Overtime: 20–4
	Pts: Velička 22; Rebs: Beručka 7 Asts: Lomažs 4 Eff: Majauskas 18	Boxscore	Pts: 24 Gray; Rebs: 12 Đorđević; Asts: 6 Gray; Eff: 28 Gray	Attendance: 2,333; Referees: Igor Dragojević, Dragan Porobić, Leandro Lezcano

10 December 2025	ratiopharm Ulm (Germany)	53–87	(Turkey) Türk Telekom	Ratiopharm Arena, Ulm
19:00	Scoring by quarter: 4–10, 21–25, 13–24, 15–28
	Pts: Smith 17; Rebs: Simon 6 Asts: Jensen 5 Eff: Smith 19	Boxscore	Pts: 15 Bankston; Rebs: 13 Bankston; Asts: 7 Devoe; Eff: 24 Bankston	Attendance: 3,129; Referees: Eduard Udyanskyy, Mario Majkić, Marko Juras

10 December 2025	Budućnost VOLI (Montenegro)	94–63	(United Kingdom) London Lions	Morača Sports Center, Podgorica
19:00	Scoring by quarter: 24–25, 18–13, 30–16, 22–9
	Pts: Tanasković 20; Rebs: Morgan, Nikolić 7 Asts: Sulaimon 6 Eff: Sulaimon, Tanasković 21	Boxscore	Pts: 16 Phillip; Rebs: 5 J. Williams, D. Williams; Asts: 5 Phillip; Eff: 20 Phillip	Attendance: 2,050; Referees: Robert Vyklický, Gentian Cici, Vassilis Pitsilkas

10 December 2025	Aris Betsson (Greece)	90–86	(Italy) Umana Reyer Venezia	Alexandreio Melathron, Thessaloniki
19:00	Scoring by quarter: 33–22, 23–21, 14–20, 20–23
	Pts: Jones 20; Rebs: Forrester 7 Asts: Jones 12; Eff: Jones 33	Boxscore	Pts: 21 Bowman; Rebs: 8 Horton, Bowman; Asts: 6 Parks; Eff: 21 Bowman	Attendance: 3,563; Referees: Piotr Pastusiak, Josip Radojković, Franko Gracin

10 December 2025	Baxi Manresa (Spain)	99–82	(Slovenia) Cedevita Olimpija	Nou Congost, Manresa
20:45	Scoring by quarter: 23–15, 23–23, 32–18, 21–26
	Pts: Obasohan 16; Rebs: Ubal 6 Asts: Gaspà 4 Eff: Akobundu-Ehiogu 18	Boxscore	Pts: 16 Škara; Rebs: 5 Škara; Asts: 3 Girard III, Nikolić; Eff: 17 Gibson, Škara	Attendance: 3,300; Referees: Joseph Bissang, Amit Balak, Ioannis Tiganis

=== Gameday 11 ===
16 December 2025	Lietkabelis (Lithuania)	79–85	(Germany) Niners Chemnitz	Kalnapilio Arena, Panevėžys
18:00	Scoring by quarter: 21–26, 15–23, 23–19, 20–17
	Pts: Kullamäe 19; Rebs: Aimaq 12; Asts: Maldūnas 4 Eff: Aimaq 18	Boxscore	Pts: 17 Sibande; Rebs: 7 Minchev; Asts: 3 Yebo, Sow; Eff: 26 Yebo	Attendance: 1,563; Referees: Robert Vyklický, Franko Gracin, Can Mavisu

16 December 2025	Cedevita Olimpija (Slovenia)	81–84	(Israel) Hapoel Midtown Jerusalem	Arena Stožice, Ljubljana
18:30	Scoring by quarter: 15–20, 18–24, 16–15, 32–25
	Pts: Nikolić 27; Rebs: Blažič, Chougkaz 5 Asts: Gibson, Nikolic 4 Eff: Nikolić 34	Boxscore	Pts: 21 Harper; Rebs: 13 Wiley; Asts: 4 Harper, Lamb; Eff: 21 Wiley	Attendance: 3,888; Referees: Kristaps Konstantinovs, Guido Giovannetti, Arnau Padrós

16 December 2025	Dolomiti Energia Trento (Italy)	91–90(OT)	(Montenegro) Budućnost VOLI	BTS Arena, Trento
20:00	Scoring by quarter: 16–17, 26–19, 12–21, 26–23, Overtime: 11–10
	Pts: Jones 19; Rebs: Jakimovski 8 Asts: Steward 4 Eff: Jones 17	Boxscore	Pts: 23 Ferrell; Rebs: 8 Boutsiele; Asts: 6 Sulaimon; Eff: 28 Ferrell	Attendance: 2,046; Referees: Sergio Manuel, Vasiliki Tsaroucha, Christian Theis

17 December 2025	Türk Telekom (Turkey)	76–80	(France) Cosea JL Bourg	Ankara Arena, Ankara
17:00	Scoring by quarter: 13–19, 24–24, 17–20, 22–17
	Pts: Alexander 21; Rebs: Alexander 10; Asts: Devoe 5 Eff: Alexander 32	Boxscore	Pts: 14 McDowell-White; Rebs: 7 Agee; Asts: 7 McDowell-White; Eff: 18 Kokila	Attendance: 6,273; Referees: Uroš Obrknežević, Michele Rossi, Vassilis Pitsilkas

17 December 2025	U-BT Cluj-Napoca (Romania)	118–97	(Lithuania) Neptūnas	BTarena, Cluj-Napoca
17:00	Scoring by quarter: 38–18, 30–22, 24–33, 26–24
	Pts: Creek 40; Rebs: Ceaser, Miletić 8 Asts: Molinar 8 Eff: Creek 43	Boxscore	Pts: 20 Lomažs; Rebs: 9 Waterman; Asts: 5 Velička; Eff: 23 Girdžiūnas	Attendance: 4,837; Referees: Oļegs Latiševs, Anne Panther, Marko Juras

17 December 2025	Panionios Cosmorama Travel (Greece)	69–94	(Germany) ratiopharm Ulm	National Athletic Center Makis Liougas, Glyfada
18:30	Scoring by quarter: 15–23, 10–23, 16–24, 28–24
	Pts: Hands 16; Rebs: Wahl 8 Asts: Starks 6 Eff: Wahl 19	Boxscore	Pts: 21 Smith; Rebs: 7 Osborne, Simon; Asts: 7 Jensen; Eff: 24 Smith	Attendance: 315; Referees: Carlos Cortés, Thomas Bissuel, Nick Van den Broeck

17 December 2025	Śląsk Wrocław (Poland)	90–96	(Spain) Baxi Manresa	Centennial Hall, Wrocław
19:00	Scoring by quarter: 25–21, 29–22, 10–21, 26–32
	Pts: Kirkwood 19; Rebs: Đorđević 12; Asts: Gray 7 Eff: Urbaniak 20	Boxscore	Pts: 21 Ubal; Rebs: 8 Oriola; Asts: 6 Brooks; Eff: 31 Ubal	Attendance: 1,934; Referees: Rain Peerandi, Gentian Cici, Denis Hadžić

17 December 2025	Veolia Towers Hamburg (Germany)	89–92	(Greece) Aris Betsson	Inselpark Arena, Hamburg
19:30	Scoring by quarter: 27–23, 12–24, 26–17, 24–28
	Pts: Daniels IV 25; Rebs: Perrin 12; Asts: Thorpe 5 Eff: Daniels IV 22	Boxscore	Pts: 20 Jones; Rebs: 10 Noua; Asts: 8 Jones; Eff: 27 Jones	Attendance: 2,651; Referees: Joseph Bissang, Adar Peer, Dragan Porobić

17 December 2025	Umana Reyer Venezia (Italy)	94–85	(Turkey) Bahçeşehir Koleji	Palasport Taliercio, Venice
20:00	Scoring by quarter: 15–14, 14–28, 32–16, 33–27
	Pts: Parks 30; Rebs: Parks 8 Asts: Cole 9 Eff: Parks 34	Boxscore	Pts: 31 Flynn; Rebs: 11 Williams; Asts: 5 Sipahi; Eff: 33 Flynn	Attendance: 2,303; Referees: Miguel Ángel Pérez, Tomasz Trawicki, Noam Gordon

17 December 2025	London Lions (United Kingdom)	98–96(OT)	(Turkey) Beşiktaş Gain	Copper Box, London
20:30	Scoring by quarter: 24–21, 19–27, 23–25, 18–11, Overtime: 14–12
	Pts: Reynolds Jr. 20; Rebs: Williams, Rai 4 Asts: McGusty 4 Eff: Reynolds Jr. 21	Boxscore	Pts: 19 Brown; Rebs: 7 Morgan; Asts: 8 Mathews; Eff: 23 Brown, Žižić	Attendance: 5,422; Referees: Emilio Pérez, Mario Majkić, Ioannis Tiganis

=== Gameday 12 ===
23 December 2025	Niners Chemnitz (Germany)	97–95	(Turkey) Beşiktaş Gain	Chemnitz Arena, Chemnitz
19:00	Scoring by quarter: 29–23, 24–21, 24–25, 20–26
	Pts: Sow 27; Rebs: Newman III 5 Asts: Davis Jr. 6 Eff: Sow 22	Boxscore	Pts: 23 Žižić; Rebs: 10 Žižić; Asts: 5 Lemar; Eff: 35 Žižić	Attendance: 4,871; Referees: Manuel Attard, Marko Juras, Stefan Ćalić

30 December 2025	Bahçeşehir Koleji (Turkey)	105–68	(Germany) Veolia Towers Hamburg	Sinan Erdem Dome, Istanbul
17:00	Scoring by quarter: 32–23, 31–15, 22–14, 20–16
	Pts: Homesley, Flynn 17; Rebs: Williams 10; Asts: Flynn, Ponitka 7 Eff: Flynn 24	Boxscore	Pts: 22 Daniels IV; Rebs: 6 Breunig; Asts: 5 Williams; Eff: 21 Daniels IV	Attendance: 736; Referees: Milivoje Jovčić, Uroš Obrknežević, Ioannis Tiganis

30 December 2025	U-BT Cluj-Napoca (Romania)	94–92	(Poland) Śląsk Wrocław	BTarena, Cluj-Napoca
18:00	Scoring by quarter: 22–17, 27–34, 21–23, 24–18
	Pts: Russell 30; Rebs: Miletić 14; Asts: Russell 7 Eff: Russell 37	Boxscore	Pts: 17 Sanon; Rebs: 9 Đorđević; Asts: 4 Sanon; Eff: 25 Đorđević	Attendance: 4,168; Referees: Michele Rossi, Kerem Baki, Nick Van den Broeck

30 December 2025	Cosea JL Bourg (France)	81–79	(Greece) Panionios Cosmorama Travel	Ekinox, Bourg-en-Bresse
18:15	Scoring by quarter: 12–20, 24–16, 28–23, 17–20
	Pts: Gach 22; Rebs: Kokila 10; Asts: McGhee 7 Eff: Gach 27	Boxscore	Pts: 16 Kreuser; Rebs: 5 Watson, Kreuser; Asts: 5 Starks, Gkikas; Eff: 20 Watson	Attendance: 2,800; Referees: Igor Dragojević, Josip Radojković, Dragan Porobić

30 December 2025	Budućnost VOLI (Montenegro)	91–81	(Turkey) Türk Telekom	Morača Sports Center, Podgorica
19:00	Scoring by quarter: 20–23, 24–21, 20–18, 27–19
	Pts: Sulaimon 25; Rebs: Tanasković 13; Asts: Mays 5 Eff: Mays 24	Boxscore	Pts: 18 Smith; Rebs: 5 Alexander, Bankston; Asts: 5 Özdemiroğlu; Eff: 22 Allman	Attendance: 3,850; Referees: Tomasz Trawicki, Gentian Cici, Arnau Padrós

30 December 2025	Hapoel Midtown Jerusalem (Israel)	105–69	(Spain) Baxi Manresa	Pais Arena, Jerusalem
19:00	Scoring by quarter: 23–22, 22–27, 27–8, 33–12
	Pts: Winston 20; Rebs: Wiley 10; Asts: Harper 7 Eff: Wiley 24	Boxscore	Pts: 14 Oriola; Rebs: 4 Oriola, Obasohan; Asts: 9 Bassas; Eff: 13 Oriola	Referees: Ilija Belosevic, Marcin Kowalski, Franko Gracin

30 December 2025	Aris Betsson (Greece)	60–89	(Slovenia) Cedevita Olimpija	Alexandreio Melathron, Thessaloniki
19:30	Scoring by quarter: 15–19, 16–25, 11–22, 18–23
	Pts: Jones 13; Rebs: Noua 7 Asts: Mitrou-Long 5 Eff: Harrell 17	Boxscore	Pts: 23 Nikolić; Rebs: 11 Chougkaz; Asts: 7 Gibson; Eff: 24 Nikolić	Attendance: 5,138; Referees: Seffi Shemmesh, Hugues Thépénier, Noam Gordon

30 December 2025	Dolomiti Energia Trento (Italy)	85–73	(United Kingdom) London Lions	BTS Arena, Trento
20:00	Scoring by quarter: 13–18, 24–20, 26–18, 22–17
	Pts: Jones 33; Rebs: Jakimovski 13; Asts: Steward 4 Eff: Jones 37	Boxscore	Pts: 22 Reynolds Jr. Rebs: 5 Williams; Asts: 6 Reynolds Jr. Eff: 26 Reynolds Jr.	Attendance: 3,037; Referees: Thomas Bissuel, Adar Peer, Leandro Lezcano

2 January 2026	Neptūnas (Lithuania)	103–118	(Italy) Umana Reyer Venezia	Švyturio Arena, Klaipėda
17:00	Scoring by quarter: 35–29, 21–29, 31–31, 16–29
	Pts: Lomažs 28; Rebs: Mockevičius 8 Asts: Velička 12; Eff: Tarolis 23	Boxscore	Pts: 28 Wiltjer; Rebs: 6 Tessitori; Asts: 8 Valentine; Eff: 3 Wiltjer	Attendance: 2,422; Referees: Maxime Boubert, Steve Bittner, Denis Hadžić

2 January 2026	ratiopharm Ulm (Germany)	79–89	(Lithuania) Lietkabelis	Ratiopharm Arena, Ulm
19:00	Scoring by quarter: 25–29, 17–19, 23–14, 14–27
	Pts: Smith 18; Rebs: Simon 6 Asts: Jensen 6 Eff: Smith 19	Boxscore	Pts: 26 Flowers; Rebs: 10 Mutic; Asts: 4 Aimaq; Eff: 28 Flowers	Attendance: 3,881; Referees: Guido Giovannetti, Sergio Manuel, Can Mavisu

=== Gameday 13 ===
6 January 2026	Beşiktaş Gain (Turkey)	97–76	(Germany) ratiopharm Ulm	BJK Akatlar Arena, Istanbul
18:00	Scoring by quarter: 26–26, 21–12, 22–20, 28–18
	Pts: Brown 23; Rebs: Žižić 11; Asts: Dotson 8 Eff: Brown 26	Boxscore	Pts: 17 Ledlum; Rebs: 5 Ledlum; Asts: 5 Ledlum; Eff: 20 Ledlum	Attendance: 1,372; Referees: Ilija Belošević, Mario Majkić, Denis Hadžić

6 January 2026	Baxi Manresa (Spain)	113–99	(Greece) Aris Betsson	Nou Congost, Manresa
19:00	Scoring by quarter: 35–18, 28–20, 24–28, 26–33
	Pts: Obasohan 18; Rebs: Olinde 8 Asts: Obasohan 6 Eff: Obasohan 24	Boxscore	Pts: 27 Jones; Rebs: 9 Noua; Asts: 5 Mitrou-Long; Eff: 29 Jones	Attendance: 4,830; Referees: Rain Peerandi, Uroš Obrknežević, Manuel Attard

6 January 2026	KK Cedevita Olimpija (Slovenia)	59–67	(Turkey) Bahçeşehir Koleji	Arena Stožice, Ljubljana
19:00	Scoring by quarter: 14–13, 21–12, 10–22, 14–20
	Pts: Gibson 25; Rebs: Brajkovic 9 Asts: Gibson, Nikolić 3 Eff: Gibson 30	Boxscore	Pts: 13 Mitchell; Rebs: 11 Williams; Asts: 5 Williams; Eff: 23 Williams	Attendance: 2,702; Referees: Carlos Peruga, Amit Balak, Gentian Cici

7 January 2026	Türk Telekom (Turkey)	92–86	(Italy) Dolomiti Energia Trento	Ankara Arena, Ankara
17:00	Scoring by quarter: 27–24, 20–19, 22–16, 23–27
	Pts: Bankston 14; Rebs: Devoe, Usher 5 Asts: Allman, Smith 5 Eff: Alexander, Bankston 19	Boxscore	Pts: 16 Jogėla, Aldridge; Rebs: 6 Aldridge; Asts: 4 Steward, Jones; Eff: 17 Jones	Attendance: 5,324; Referees: Artūras Šukys, Anne Panther, Nick Van den Broeck

7 January 2026	Lietkabelis (Lithuania)	73–86	(France) Cosea JL Bourg	Kalnapilio Arena, Panevėžys
18:00	Scoring by quarter: 15–22, 16–16, 20–19, 22–29
	Pts: Morris 22; Rebs: Aimaq 12; Asts: Kullamäe, Flowers 4 Eff: Flowers 20	Boxscore	Pts: 19 Agee; Rebs: 7 Kokila, Mokoka; Asts: 5 McGhee; Eff: 25 Kokila	Attendance: 1,655; Referees: Robert Vyklický, Kerem Baki, Marko Juras

7 January 2026	Panionios Cosmorama Travel (Greece)	97–85	(Montenegro) Budućnost VOLI	National Athletic Center Makis Liougas, Glyfada
18:30	Scoring by quarter: 17–23, 26–21, 28–18, 26–23
	Pts: Tsalmpouris 18; Rebs: Lemon 5 Asts: Gkikas 9 Eff: Thomasson 29	Boxscore	Pts: 17 Tanasković; Rebs: 5 Tanasković; Asts: 5 Sulaimon; Eff: 22 Tanasković	Attendance: 361; Referees: Thomas Bissuel, Maxime Boubert, Adar Peer

7 January 2026	Śląsk Wrocław (Poland)	72–115	(Israel) Hapoel Midtown Jerusalem	Centennial Hall, Wrocław
19:00	Scoring by quarter: 22–32, 20–32, 22–31, 8–20
	Pts: Penava, Niziol 15; Rebs: Núñez, Coleman-Jones 5 Asts: Sanon 5 Eff: Penava, Niziol 21	Boxscore	Pts: 22 Winston; Rebs: 12 Wiley, Lamb; Asts: 8 Harper; Eff: 31 Wiley	Attendance: 1,807; Referees: Sašo Petek, Josip Radojković, Hüseyin Çelik

7 January 2026	Veolia Towers Hamburg (Germany)	94–98	(Lithuania) Neptūnas	Inselpark Arena, Hamburg
19:45	Scoring by quarter: 24–25, 20–23, 24–21, 26–29
	Pts: Williams 32; Rebs: three players 5 Asts: Thorpe 4 Eff: Williams 34	Boxscore	Pts: 33 Lomažs; Rebs: 10 Majauskas; Asts: 6 Lomažs; Eff: 36 Lomažs	Attendance: 1,201; Referees: Michele Rossi, Hugues Thépénier, Can Mavisu

7 January 2026	Umana Reyer Venezia (Italy)	90–83	(Romania) U-BT Cluj-Napoca	Palasport Taliercio, Venice
20:00	Scoring by quarter: 19–16, 22–18, 20–18, 29–31
	Pts: Nikolić 23; Rebs: Cole 8 Asts: Cole 4 Eff: Nikolić 26	Boxscore	Pts: 18 Woodbury, Creek; Rebs: 9 Miletić; Asts: 5 Molinar, Russell; Eff: 24 Creek	Attendance: 1,536; Referees: Alberto Baena, Leandro Lezcano, Ioannis Tiganis

7 January 2026	London Lions (United Kingdom)	70–78	(Germany) Niners Chemnitz	Copper Box, London
20:30	Scoring by quarter: 18–23, 23–17, 16–22, 13–16
	Pts: Phillip, Reynolds Jr. 15; Rebs: Williams 9 Asts: Phillip 5 Eff: Williams, Reynolds Jr. 16	Boxscore	Pts: 22 Mushidi; Rebs: 7 Newman III; Asts: 5 Yebo, Mushidi; Eff: 26 Mushidi	Attendance: 1,867; Referees: Sergio Manuel, Vassilis Pitsilkas, Noam Gordon

=== Gameday 14 ===
13 January 2026	Bahçeşehir Koleji (Turkey)	92–96	(Spain) Baxi Manresa	Sinan Erdem Dome, Istanbul
17:00	Scoring by quarter: 27–28, 12–24, 16–20, 37–24
	Pts: Flynn 21; Rebs: Williams 9 Asts: Hale 4 Eff: Williams 24	Boxscore	Pts: 20 Obasohan; Rebs: 6 Olinde; Asts: 4 Ubal, Golden; Eff: 24 Ubal	Attendance: 899; Referees: Mehdi Difallah, Steve Bittner, Vassilis Pitsilkas

13 January 2026	Neptūnas (Lithuania)	85–104	(Slovenia) Cedevita Olimpija	Švyturio Arena, Klaipėda
18:00	Scoring by quarter: 16–24, 25–23, 20–27, 24–30
	Pts: Waterman 15; Rebs: Waterman 7 Asts: Lomažs 6 Eff: Velička 17	Boxscore	Pts: 25 Gibson; Rebs: 8 Škara; Asts: 4 five players Eff: 28 Škara	Attendance: 1,789; Referees: Ioannis Foufis, Sergio Manuel RodríguezSergio Manuel, Manuel Attard

13 January 2026	U-BT Cluj-Napoca (Romania)	103–92	(Germany) Veolia Towers Hamburg	BTarena, Cluj-Napoca
18:00	Scoring by quarter: 27–14, 23–25, 28–18, 25–35
	Pts: Russell 23; Rebs: Guzmán 12; Asts: Guzman 7 Eff: Russell 30	Boxscore	Pts: 19 Perrin; Rebs: 13 Perrin; Asts: 9 Thorpe; Eff: 29 Perrin	Attendance: 3,347; Referees: Seffi Shemmesh, Josip Radojković, Noam Gordon

13 January 2026	Dolomiti Energia Trento (Italy)	88–87	(Greece) Panionios Cosmorama Travel	BTS Arena, Trento
20:00	Scoring by quarter: 25–15, 26–22, 13–32, 24–18
	Pts: Steward 16; Rebs: Aldridge 8 Asts: Jones 8 Eff: Jones 25	Boxscore	Pts: 19 Tsalmpouris; Rebs: 6 three players Asts: 8 Thomasson; Eff: 27 Thomasson	Attendance: 2,527; Referees: Joseph Bissang, Gentian Cici, Franko Gracin

14 January 2026	Türk Telekom (Turkey)	88–63	(United Kingdom) London Lions	Ankara Arena, Ankara
17:00	Scoring by quarter: 14–11, 16–21, 30–10, 28–21
	Pts: Trifunović 16; Rebs: Simonović 13; Asts: Özdemiroğlu 7 Eff: Simonović 21	Boxscore	Pts: 12 Sandy; Rebs: 6 Reynolds Jr. Asts: 6 Phillip; Eff: 13 Phillip, Reynolds Jr.	Attendance: 6,711; Referees: Kristaps Konstantinovs, Denis Hadžić, Ioannis Tiganis

14 January 2026	ratiopharm Ulm (Germany)	88–76	(Germany) Niners Chemnitz	Ratiopharm Arena, Ulm
19:00	Scoring by quarter: 22–19, 24–22, 18–23, 24–12
	Pts: Ledlum 24; Rebs: Osborne 11; Asts: Jensen 6 Eff: Ledlum 30	Boxscore	Pts: 20 Sow; Rebs: 11 Yebo; Asts: 10 Davis Jr. Eff: 21 Sow	Attendance: 4,971; Referees: Igor Dragojević, Leandro Lezcano, Nick Van den Broeck

14 January 2026	Budućnost VOLI (Montenegro)	95–81	(Lithuania) Lietkabelis	Morača Sports Center, Podgorica
19:00	Scoring by quarter: 25–25, 20–26, 26–16, 24–14
	Pts: Bouteille 22; Rebs: Thompson 9 Asts: Ferrell 10; Eff: Ferrell, Bouteille 23	Boxscore	Pts: 19 Aimaq, Danusevičius; Rebs: 6 Danusevičius; Asts: 6 Kullamäe; Eff: 26 Aimaq, Danusevičius	Attendance: 2,123; Referees: Jordi Aliaga, Christian Theis, Arnau Padrós

14 January 2026	Aris Betsson (Greece)	77–96	(Israel) Hapoel Midtown Jerusalem	Alexandreio Melathron, Thessaloniki
19:00	Scoring by quarter: 16–27, 21–19, 15–27, 25–23
	Pts: Jones 17; Rebs: Noua 5 Asts: Mitrou-Long 4 Eff: Jones 14	Boxscore	Pts: 17 Harper, Carrington; Rebs: 8 Wiley, Lamb; Asts: 5 Harper; Eff: 22 Carrington	Attendance: 2,536; Referees: Alberto Baena, Guido Giovannetti, Can Mavisu

14 January 2026	Cosea JL Bourg (France)	99–103	(Turkey) Beşiktaş Gain	Ekinox, Bourg-en-Bresse
19:30	Scoring by quarter: 24–26, 26–26, 26–24, 23–27
	Pts: McGhee 25; Rebs: Mokoka 7 Asts: McGhee 3 Eff: McGhee 25	Boxscore	Pts: 26 Žižić; Rebs: 6 Morgan; Asts: 5 Mathews; Eff: 34 Žižić	Attendance: 3,200; Referees: Milan Nedović, Uroš Obrknežević, Stefan Ćalić

14 January 2026	Umana Reyer Venezia (Italy)	103–76	(Poland) Śląsk Wrocław	Palasport Taliercio, Venice
20:00	Scoring by quarter: 31–21, 24–23, 22–18, 26–14
	Pts: Lever, Wheatle 19; Rebs: Horton 14; Asts: Cole 7 Eff: Wheatle 29	Boxscore	Pts: 15 Gray; Rebs: 6 Penava, Coleman-Jones; Asts: 7 Gray; Eff: 18 Gray	Attendance: 2,053; Referees: Miloš Koljenšić, Mario Majkić, Marko Juras

=== Gameday 15 ===
20 January 2026	Cedevita Olimpija (Slovenia)	86–80	(Romania) U-BT Cluj-Napoca	Tivoli Hall, Ljubljana
18:30	Scoring by quarter: 24–12, 13–22, 23–25, 26–21
	Pts: Stewart Jr. 25; Rebs: Stewart Jr. 6 Asts: three players 3 Eff: Stewart Jr. 32	Boxscore	Pts: 16 Guzmán, Miletić; Rebs: 13 Miletić; Asts: 10 Russell; Eff: 28 Miletić	Attendance: 2,991; Referees: Emin Moğulkoç, Tomasz Trawicki, Thomas Bissuel

20 January 2026	Hapoel Midtown Jerusalem (Israel)	82–94	(Turkey) Bahçeşehir Koleji	Ranko Žeravica Sports Hall, Belgrade
19:00	Scoring by quarter: 29–19, 20–30, 9–21, 24–24
	Pts: Carrington 25; Rebs: Wiley 10; Asts: Harper, Winston 4 Eff: Carrington 24	Boxscore	Pts: 22 Flynn; Rebs: 9 Ponitka; Asts: 4 Flynn; Eff: 18 Flynn	Attendance: 76; Referees: Ilija Belošević, Marko Juras, Ioannis Tiganis

20 January 2026	Niners Chemnitz (Germany)	88–82	(France) Cosea JL Bourg	Chemnitz Arena, Chemnitz
19:00	Scoring by quarter: 17–18, 24–20, 26–19, 21–25
	Pts: Davis Jr. 19; Rebs: Sow 8 Asts: Davis Jr. 7 Eff: Davis Jr. 23	Boxscore	Pts: 17 Gach; Rebs: 6 Gach, Lindo; Asts: 6 Agee; Eff: 20 Agee	Attendance: 3,098; Referees: Borys Ryzhyk, Ioannis Foufis, Denis Hadžić

20 January 2026	Śląsk Wrocław (Poland)	107–113(OT)	(Greece) Aris Betsson	Centennial Hall, Wrocław
19:00	Scoring by quarter: 19–24, 31–24, 21–24, 18–17, Overtime: 9–9, 9–15
	Pts: Kirkwood 24; Rebs: Sanon, Coleman-Jones 6 Asts: Kirkwood, Gray 7 Eff: Kirkwood 28	Boxscore	Pts: 26 Mitrou-Long, Anđušić; Rebs: 9 Noua; Asts: 6 Anđušić; Eff: 28 Anđušić	Attendance: 3,424; Referees: Milan Nedović, Gentian Cici, Igor Dragojević

21 January 2026	Lietkabelis (Lithuania)	93–94	(Italy) Dolomiti Energia Trento	Kalnapilio Arena, Panevėžys
18:00	Scoring by quarter: 15–29, 34–23, 25–17, 19–25
	Pts: Morris 24; Rebs: Aimaq 9 Asts: Kullamäe 4 Eff: Aimaq 18	Boxscore	Pts: 24 Jones; Rebs: 7 Aldridge; Asts: 10 Jones; Eff: 43 Jones	Attendance: 1,430; Referees: Eduard Udyanskyy, Hüseyin Çelik, Can Mavisu

21 January 2026	Beşiktaş Gain (Turkey)	96–74	(Montenegro) Budućnost VOLI	BJK Akatlar Arena, Istanbul
18:00	Scoring by quarter: 27–11, 22–26, 27–17, 20–20
	Pts: Brown 14; Rebs: Morgan, Žižić 8 Asts: Uğurlu, Žižić 5 Eff: Uğurlu 22	Boxscore	Pts: 18 Ferrell; Rebs: 4 Boutsiele; Asts: 3 three players Eff: 29 Ferrell	Attendance: 2,500; Referees: Robert Vyklický, Leandro Lezcano, Vassilis Pitsilkas

21 January 2026	Panionios Cosmorama Travel (Greece)	61–106	(Turkey) Türk Telekom	National Athletic Center Makis Liougas, Glyfada
18:30	Scoring by quarter: 17–20, 16–34, 15–23, 13–29
	Pts: Watson 19; Rebs: Watson 6 Asts: Taylor, Thomasson 4 Eff: Watson 19	Boxscore	Pts: 23 Allman; Rebs: 6 Alexander; Asts: 9 Devoe; Eff: 28 Allman	Attendance: 207; Referees: Guido Giovannetti, Mario Majkić, Noam Gordon

21 January 2026	Veolia Towers Hamburg (Germany)	95–87	(Italy) Umana Reyer Venezia	Inselpark Arena, Hamburg
19:30	Scoring by quarter: 26–21, 28–23, 10–20, 31–23
	Pts: Daniels IV, Perrin 21; Rebs: Perrin 12; Asts: Daniels IV 5 Eff: Perrin 33	Boxscore	Pts: 17 Cole; Rebs: 8 Horton; Asts: 3 Horton, Wheatle; Eff: 16 Parks	Attendance: 909; Referees: Uroš Obrknežević, Sergio Manuel, Kerem Baki

21 January 2026	London Lions (United Kingdom)	72–73	(Germany) ratiopharm Ulm	Copper Box, London
20:30	Scoring by quarter: 18–19, 14–17, 13–15, 27–22
	Pts: Phillip 19; Rebs: Brown Jr., Williams 5 Asts: Phillip, Reynolds Jr. 5 Eff: Phillip 24	Boxscore	Pts: 23 Sengfelder; Rebs: 8 Smith; Asts: 5 Jensen, Smith; Eff: 34 Sengfelder	Attendance: 2,060; Referees: Manuel Attard, Arnau Padrós, Franko Gracin

21 January 2026	Baxi Manresa (Spain)	97–96	(Lithuania) Neptūnas	Nou Congost, Manresa
20:45	Scoring by quarter: 22–24, 24–29, 16–20, 35–23
	Pts: Olinde 24; Rebs: Olinde 9 Asts: Bassas 9 Eff: Olinde 32	Boxscore	Pts: 25 Velička; Rebs: 6 Tarolis; Asts: 11 Velička; Eff: 37 Velička	Attendance: 3,262; Referees: Anne Panther, Christian Theis, Nick Van den Broeck

=== Gameday 16 ===
27 January 2026	Türk Telekom (Turkey)	85–75	(Lithuania) Lietkabelis	Ankara Arena, Ankara
17:00	Scoring by quarter: 25–20, 20–18, 21–19, 19–18
	Pts: Özdemiroğlu 22; Rebs: Durmaz 6 Asts: Özdemiroğlu 11; Eff: Özdemiroğlu 27	Boxscore	Pts: 14 Furmanavičius; Rebs: 15 Aimaq; Asts: 4 Morris, Flowers; Eff: 18 Furmanavičius	Attendance: 7,084; Referees: Ilija Belošević, Maxime Boubert, Stefan Ćalić

27 January 2026	Budućnost VOLI (Montenegro)	97–81	(Germany) Niners Chemnitz	Morača Sports Center, Podgorica
19:00	Scoring by quarter: 29–30, 31–14, 18–21, 19–16
	Pts: Mays 22; Rebs: Boutsiele 7 Asts: Morgan 7 Eff: Mays 29	Boxscore	Pts: 19 Mushidi; Rebs: 10 Yebo; Asts: 4 three players Eff: 22 Yebo	Attendance: 2,560; Referees: Michele Rossi, Guido Giovannetti, Hüseyin Çelik

27 January 2026	Dolomiti Energia Trento (Italy)	87–74	(Turkey) Beşiktaş Gain	BTS Arena, Trento
20:00	Scoring by quarter: 17–24, 25–9, 24–16, 21–25
	Pts: Steward 19; Rebs: Jakimovski 10; Asts: Jones 5 Eff: Steward 23	Boxscore	Pts: 17 Morgan; Rebs: 4 three players Asts: 4 Mathews; Eff: 17 Morgan	Attendance: 2,504; Referees: Ioannis Foufis, Hugues Thépénier, Arnau Padrós

28 January 2026	Bahçeşehir Koleji (Turkey)	81–79	(Greece) Aris Betsson	Sinan Erdem Dome, Istanbul
17:00	Scoring by quarter: 19–23, 20–19, 17–22, 25–15
	Pts: Cavanaugh 20; Rebs: Flynn, Williams 7 Asts: Flynn 6 Eff: Flynn 35	Boxscore	Pts: 16 Jones; Rebs: 6 Forrester; Asts: 4 Bochoridis, Anđušić; Eff: 20 Jones	Attendance: 2,060; Referees: Milivoje Jovčić, Manuel Attard, Dragan Porobić

28 January 2026	Neptūnas (Lithuania)	98–92	(Israel) Hapoel Midtown Jerusalem	Švyturio Arena, Klaipėda
18:00	Scoring by quarter: 33–25, 21–30, 23–17, 21–20
	Pts: Lomažs 31; Rebs: Šiliņš 10; Asts: Velička 12; Eff: Lomažs 33	Boxscore	Pts: 19 Harper; Rebs: 6 Wiley; Asts: 4 Harper; Eff: 24 Harper	Attendance: 1,667; Referees: Jordi Aliaga, Mario Majkic, Vassilis Pitsilkas

28 January 2026	Panionios Cosmorama Travel (Greece)	79–78	(United Kingdom) London Lions	National Athletic Center Makis Liougas, Glyfada
18:30	Scoring by quarter: 17–24, 21–17, 19–21, 22–16
	Pts: Taylor 20; Rebs: Watson 9 Asts: Taylor 7 Eff: Taylor 23	Boxscore	Pts: 16 three players Rebs: 8 Price; Asts: 6 Reynolds Jr. Eff: 21 Reynolds Jr.	Attendance: 159; Referees: Damir Javor, Robert Vyklický, Adar Peer

28 January 2026	Cosea JL Bourg (France)	97–66	(Germany) ratiopharm Ulm	Ekinox, Bourg-en-Bresse
19:30	Scoring by quarter: 19–9, 26–18, 32–19, 20–20
	Pts: Labanca 14; Rebs: Mitchell 9 Asts: Mokoka 7 Eff: Mitchell 23	Boxscore	Pts: 11 Osborne; Rebs: 6 Sengfelder; Asts: 6 Jensen; Eff: 9 Osborne	Attendance: 2,500; Referees: Alberto Baena, Vasiliki Tsaroucha, Kerem Baki

28 January 2026	Veolia Towers Hamburg (Germany)	99–96	(Poland) Śląsk Wrocław	Inselpark Arena, Hamburg
19:30	Scoring by quarter: 31–22, 24–28, 21–19, 23–27
	Pts: Daniels IV 26; Rebs: Perrin 8 Asts: Thorpe, Daniels IV 8 Eff: Daniels IV 33	Boxscore	Pts: 22 Gray; Rebs: 7 Núñez, Urbaniak; Asts: 10 Gray; Eff: 31 Gray	Attendance: 1,348; Referees: Joseph Bissang, Leandro Lezcano, Denis Hadžić

28 January 2026	Umana Reyer Venezia (Italy)	86–84	(Slovenia) Cedevita Olimpija	Palasport Taliercio, Venice
20:00	Scoring by quarter: 19–29, 22–17, 21–21, 24–17
	Pts: Parks 22; Rebs: three players 5 Asts: Candi 5 Eff: Parks 21	Boxscore	Pts: 19 Gibson; Rebs: 6 Brajkovic, Hurt; Asts: 5 Nikolić; Eff: 17 Hurt	Attendance: 2,830; Referees: Rain Peerandi, Amit Balak, Christian Theis

28 January 2026	Baxi Manresa (Spain)	101–99	(Romania) U-BT Cluj-Napoca	Nou Congost, Manresa
20:45	Scoring by quarter: 17–30, 35–22, 22–27, 27–20
	Pts: Obasohan 29; Rebs: Olinde 8 Asts: Bassas 5 Eff: Obasohan 33	Boxscore	Pts: 27 Creek; Rebs: 8 Miletić; Asts: 5 Russell; Eff: 34 Creek	Attendance: 3,775; Referees: Mehdi Difallah, Uroš Obrknežević, Marko Juras

=== Gameday 17 ===
3 February 2026	Bahçeşehir Koleji (Turkey)	80–82	(Poland) Śląsk Wrocław	Sinan Erdem Dome, Istanbul
17:00	Scoring by quarter: 18–20, 17–22, 22–18, 23–22
	Pts: Flynn 19; Rebs: Williams 10; Asts: Mitchell, Flynn 3 Eff: Flynn 25	Boxscore	Pts: 19 Gray; Rebs: 7 Đorđević; Asts: 10 Gray; Eff: 29 Gray	Attendance: 2,027; Referees: Artūras Šukys, Vasiliki Tsaroucha, Christian Theis

3 February 2026	ratiopharm Ulm (Germany)	90–103	(Montenegro) Budućnost VOLI	Ratiopharm Arena, Ulm
19:00	Scoring by quarter: 19–23, 26–22, 30–21, 15–37
	Pts: Ledlum 27; Rebs: Sengfelder 9 Asts: Jensen 4 Eff: Ledlum 18	Boxscore	Pts: 23 Ferrell; Rebs: 6 Tanasković; Asts: 5 Ferrell; Eff: 26 Ferrell	Attendance: 4,064; Referees: Seffi Shemmesh, Sergio Manuel, Nick Van den Broeck

3 February 2026	Lietkabelis (Lithuania)	89–62	(Greece) Panionios Cosmorama Travel	Kalnapilio Arena, Panevėžys
18:00	Scoring by quarter: 26–16, 20–11, 19–15, 24–20
	Pts: Aimaq, Kullamäe 19; Rebs: Aimaq 14; Asts: Danusevičius 5 Eff: Aimaq 26	Boxscore	Pts: 16 Thomasson; Rebs: 10 Patrikis; Asts: 4 Taylor, Gkikas; Eff: 17 Patrikis	Attendance: 1,243; Referees: Jordi Aliaga, Kerem Baki, Franko Gracin

3 February 2026	Beşiktaş Gain (Turkey)	91–81	(Turkey) Türk Telekom	BJK Akatlar Arena, Istanbul
18:00	Scoring by quarter: 19–23, 24–15, 25–22, 23–21
	Pts: Dotson 22; Rebs: Žižić 11; Asts: Mathews 5 Eff: Dotson, Žižić 25	Boxscore	Pts: 19 Smith; Rebs: 7 Usher; Asts: 4 Özdemiroğlu; Eff: 24 Alexander	Attendance: 2,629; Referees: Damir Javor, Gentian Cici, Dragan Porobić

4 February 2026	Hapoel Midtown Jerusalem (Israel)	114–104(OT)	(Romania) U-BT Cluj-Napoca	Pais Arena, Jerusalem
19:00	Scoring by quarter: 22–19, 26–14, 23–27, 25–36, Overtime: 18–8
	Pts: Harper 30; Rebs: Wiley 17; Asts: Harper 6 Eff: Harper 33	Boxscore	Pts: 28 Woodbury; Rebs: 7 Taylor; Asts: 6 Woodbury; Eff: 28 Woodbury	Attendance: 2,764; Referees: Miguel Ángel Pérez, Ioannis Foufis, Robert Vyklický

4 February 2026	Niners Chemnitz (Germany)	81–67	(Italy) Dolomiti Energia Trento	Chemnitz Arena, Chemnitz
19:00	Scoring by quarter: 18–17, 21–19, 21–21, 21–10
	Pts: Sibande 25; Rebs: Newman III 6 Asts: Davis Jr. 11; Eff: Sibande 29	Boxscore	Pts: 26 Steward; Rebs: 8 Jakimovski; Asts: 6 Jogėla; Eff: 19 Steward	Attendance: 3,817; Referees: Sérgio Silva, Vassilis Pitsilkas, Noam Gordon

4 February 2026	Cosea JL Bourg (France)	86–85	(United Kingdom) London Lions	Ekinox, Bourg-en-Bresse
19:30	Scoring by quarter: 22–19, 22–15, 10–26, 32–25
	Pts: Gach 19; Rebs: Mitchell 5 Asts: McGhee 9 Eff: McGhee 21	Boxscore	Pts: 21 Price; Rebs: 8 Williams; Asts: 10 Reynolds Jr. Eff: 26 Phillip	Attendance: 3,000; Referees: Anne Panther, Mario Majkić, Can Mavisu

4 February 2026	Aris Betsson (Greece)	83–64	(Lithuania) Neptūnas	Alexandreio Melathron, Thessaloniki
20:00	Scoring by quarter: 21–21, 19–13, 25–8, 18–22
	Pts: Jones, Noua 16; Rebs: Noua, Kulboka 5 Asts: Jones 6 Eff: Jones 21	Boxscore	Pts: 19 Lomažs; Rebs: 9 Velička; Asts: 8 Velička; Eff: 25 Lomažs	Attendance: 4,990; Referees: Joseph Bissang, Adar Peer, Marko Juras

4 February 2026	Baxi Manresa (Spain)	75–91	(Italy) Umana Reyer Venezia	Nou Congost, Manresa
20:45	Scoring by quarter: 24–24, 25–23, 17–19, 9–25
	Pts: Obasohan 17; Rebs: Olinde 9 Asts: Bassas 6 Eff: Obasohan 16	Boxscore	Pts: 25 Cole; Rebs: 9 Valentine; Asts: 5 Cole; Eff: 23 Cole	Attendance: 4,607; Referees: Hugues Thépénier, Denis Hadžić, Ioannis Tiganis

5 February 2026	Veolia Towers Hamburg (Germany)	74–88	(Slovenia) Cedevita Olimpija	Inselpark Arena, Hamburg
19:30	Scoring by quarter: 16–25, 16–25, 19–18, 23–20
	Pts: Williams 20; Rebs: Maronka 5 Asts: Thorpe 4 Eff: Williams 21	Boxscore	Pts: 15 Hurt; Rebs: 6 Hurt, Škara; Asts: 5 Nikolić; Eff: 19 Hurt	Attendance: 1,105; Referees: Sreten Radović, Hüseyin Çelik, Arnau Padrós

=== Gameday 18 ===
10 February 2026	Panionios Cosmorama Travel (Greece)	74–114	(Turkey) Beşiktaş Gain	National Athletic Center Makis Liougas, Glyfada
18:30	Scoring by quarter: 26–31, 11–28, 15–24, 22–31
	Pts: Watson 19; Rebs: Watson 6 Asts: Taylor, Nikolaidis 5 Eff: Watson 18	Boxscore	Pts: 15 A. Brown, V. Brown; Rebs: 10 Kamagate; Asts: 6 Uğurlu, Lemar; Eff: 20 Kamagate	Attendance: 381; Referees: Michele Rossi, Sergio Manuel, Marko Juras

10 February 2026	Śląsk Wrocław (Poland)	81–114	(Slovenia) Cedevita Olimpija	Centennial Hall, Wrocław
19:00	Scoring by quarter: 20–30, 11–35, 26–23, 24–26
	Pts: Niziol 13; Rebs: Đorđević 9 Asts: Sanon 6 Eff: Dordevic 15	Boxscore	Pts: 20 Gibson; Rebs: 7 Škara; Asts: 9 Gibson; Eff: 31 Gibson	Attendance: 2,319; Referees: Josip Radojković, Hugues Thépénier, Can Mavisu

10 February 2026	Dolomiti Energia Trento (Italy)	76–68	(Germany) ratiopharm Ulm	BTS Arena, Trento
20:00	Scoring by quarter: 19–21, 23–15, 13–16, 21–16
	Pts: Jones 24; Rebs: Steward, Mawugbe 7 Asts: Jones 6 Eff: Jones 27	Boxscore	Pts: 16 Faye; Rebs: 5 Faye, Simon; Asts: 4 Weidemann, Klepeisz; Eff: 15 Faye	Attendance: 3,044; Referees: Joseph Bissang, Hüseyin Çelik, Adar Peer

11 February 2026	U-BT Cluj-Napoca (Romania)	111–92	(Greece) Aris Betsson	BTarena, Cluj-Napoca
17:00	Scoring by quarter: 31–21, 24–22, 28–22, 28–27
	Pts: Molinar 20; Rebs: Ceaser 7 Asts: Russell 8 Eff: Guzmán 27	Boxscore	Pts: 24 Jones; Rebs: 9 Jones; Asts: 9 Jones; Eff: 32 Jones	Attendance: 10,000; Referees: Jakub Zamojski, Anne Panther, Kerem Baki

11 February 2026	Türk Telekom (Turkey)	79–62	(Germany) Niners Chemnitz	Ankara Arena, Ankara
17:00	Scoring by quarter: 20–17, 14–19, 22–16, 23–10
	Pts: Allman, Smith 14; Rebs: Alexander 6 Asts: Bankston 4 Eff: Allman 17	Boxscore	Pts: 14 Yebo; Rebs: 7 Bedime; Asts: 7 Davis Jr. Eff: 17 Bedime	Attendance: 6,216; Referees: Ioannis Foufis, Manuel Attard, Franko Gracin

11 February 2026	Budućnost VOLI (Montenegro)	96–84	(France) Cosea JL Bourg	Morača Sports Center, Podgorica
19:00	Scoring by quarter: 27–11, 25–20, 21–30, 23–23
	Pts: Ferrell 19; Rebs: Tanasković 8 Asts: Ferrell 6 Eff: Ferrell, Boutsiele 24	Boxscore	Pts: 18 Moularé; Rebs: 6 Lindo; Asts: 3 four players Eff: 17 Moulare	Attendance: 4,120; Referees: Juan Carlos García, Eduard Udyanskyy, Gentian Cici

11 February 2026	Neptūnas (Lithuania)	86–91	(Turkey) Bahçeşehir Koleji	Švyturio Arena, Klaipėda
19:00	Scoring by quarter: 21–30, 24–20, 22–20, 19–21
	Pts: Girdžiūnas 20; Rebs: Waterman 6 Asts: Velička 8 Eff: Velička 24	Boxscore	Pts: 23 Cavanaugh; Rebs: 10 Cavanaugh; Asts: 7 Flynn; Eff: 32 Cavanaugh	Attendance: 1,558; Referees: Sérgio Silva, Steve Bittner, Stefan Ćalić

11 February 2026	Veolia Towers Hamburg (Germany)	94–116	(Spain) Baxi Manresa	Inselpark Arena, Hamburg
19:30	Scoring by quarter: 33–31, 21–30, 23–32, 17–23
	Pts: Daniels IV 22; Rebs: Daniels IV 5 Asts: Thorpe 6 Eff: Daniels IV 20	Boxscore	Pts: 24 Ubal; Rebs: 9 Oriola; Asts: 10 Bassas; Eff: 27 Ubal	Attendance: 1,336; Referees: Milivoje Jovčić, Amit Balak, Dragan Porobić

11 February 2026	Umana Reyer Venezia (Italy)	83–80	(Israel) Hapoel Midtown Jerusalem	Palasport Taliercio, Venice
20:00	Scoring by quarter: 17–14, 25–21, 20–14, 21–31
	Pts: Wiltjer 22; Rebs: Wheatle 8 Asts: Candi 6 Eff: Wiltjer 25	Boxscore	Pts: 24 Harper; Rebs: 12 Wiley; Asts: 5 Harper; Eff: 18 Harper	Attendance: 2,252; Referees: Alberto Baena, Tomasz Trawicki, Arnau Padrós

11 February 2026	London Lions (United Kingdom)	58–66	(Lithuania) Lietkabelis	Copper Box, London
20:30	Scoring by quarter: 14–12, 11–23, 20–12, 13–19
	Pts: Reynolds Jr. 13; Rebs: Price 7 Asts: Phillip 5 Eff: Phillip 16	Boxscore	Pts: 20 Morris; Rebs: 14 Aimaq; Asts: 3 three players Eff: 17 Maldūnas	Attendance: 3,267; Referees: Luka Kardum, Vasiliki Tsaroucha, Leandro Lezcano
