= Miloš Koljenšić =

Montenegrin basketball referee

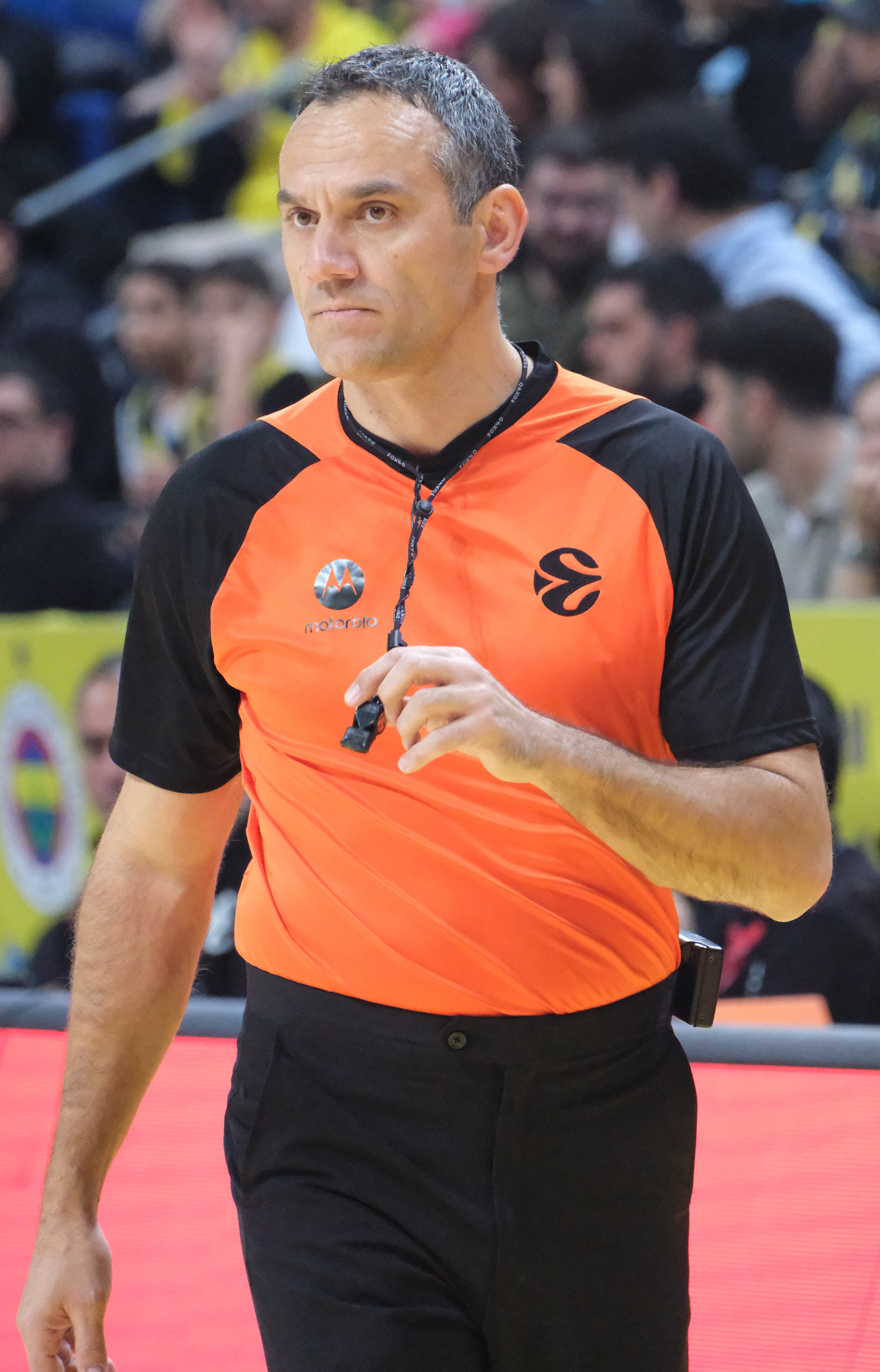
- Koljenšić in 2025

Personal information
- Born: Montenegro
- Position: Referee

Career highlights
- EuroLeague referee; EuroCup referee; ABA League referee; Selected for the 2026 EuroLeague Final Four; EuroLeague Playoffs referee (2024–present)

Miloš Koljenšić is a Montenegrin professional basketball referee who officiates in the EuroLeague, EuroCup, and ABA League.

He has served as one of the leading Montenegrin referees in European basketball, receiving appointments in EuroLeague regular season, playoff and EuroCup games.

== Refereeing career ==
Koljenšić developed through the Montenegrin refereeing system under the Basketball Federation of Montenegro. He later became an official in the ABA League and joined the EuroLeague Basketball officiating panel. He made European club assignments date back to the 2013–14 EuroCup season.

He continued to officiate EuroCup and EuroLeague games throughout the 2020s, including contests involving clubs such as Saski Baskonia, Virtus Bologna, Žalgiris Kaunas, Gran Canaria, Hapoel Tel Aviv and Turk Telekom.

In the 2025–26 season, Koljenšić officiated 25 EuroLeague games and 12 EuroCup games, including the first game of the EuroCup Finals between Beşiktaş and Burg.

In April 2026, Koljenšić was named among the 28 referees selected for the EuroLeague Playoffs. In May 2026, he was selected for the 2026 EuroLeague Final Four in Athens, becoming one of the first Montenegrin referees to receive such an appointment.

== Selected notable assignments ==
- EuroLeague Playoffs (2024–present)
- 2026 EuroLeague Final Four
- EuroCup Finals game one (2026)
- ABA League playoff games
