= Deane Williams =

British basketball player

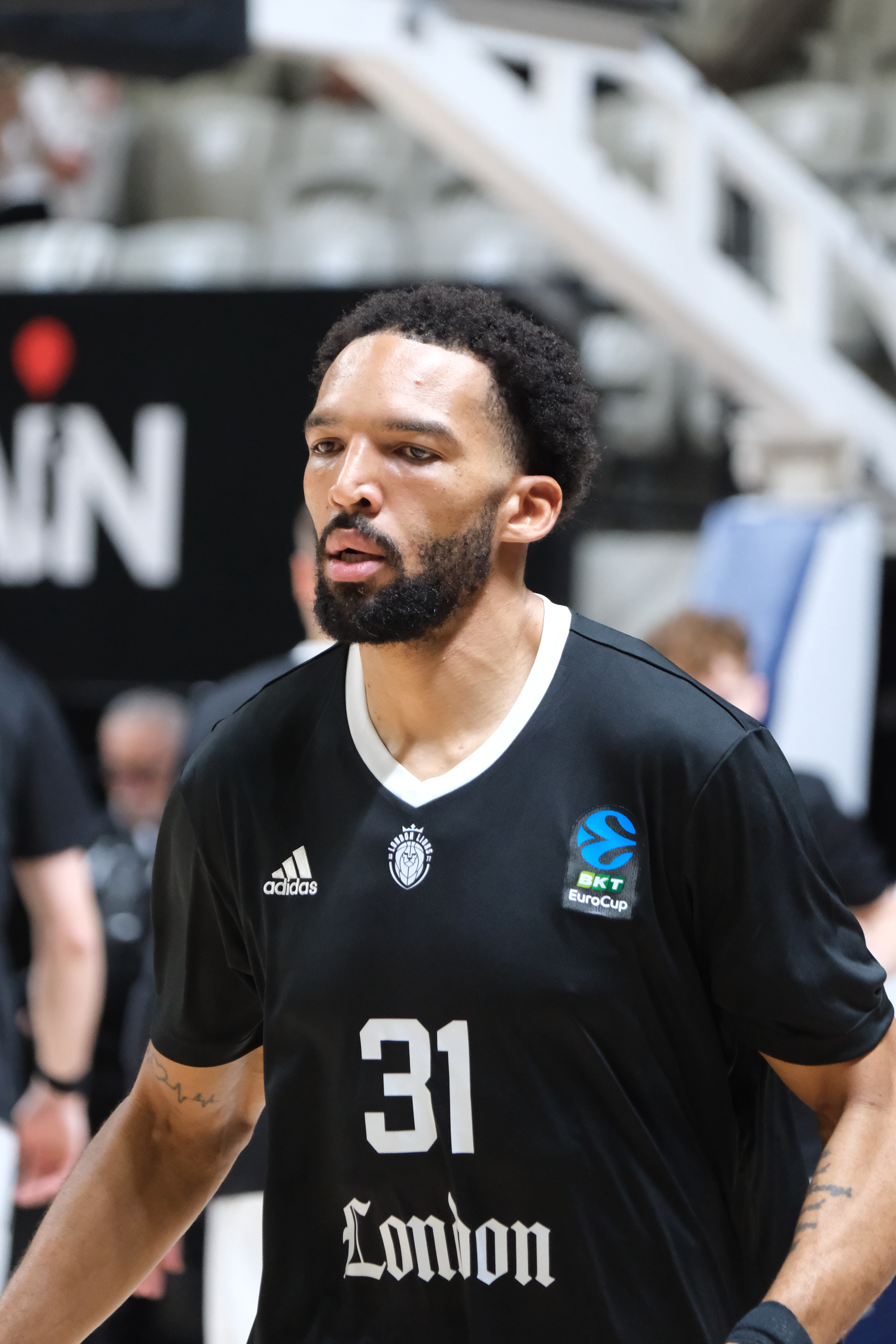
- Williams with the London Lions in 2025

No. 31 – London Lions
- Position: Power forward
- League: SLB; EuroCup

Personal information
- Born: 23 September 1996 (age 30) Bath, England
- Listed height: 203 cm (6 ft 8 in)
- Listed weight: 103 kg (227 lb)

Career information
- College: Augusta (2015–2019)
- Playing career: 2019–present

Career history
- 2019–2021: Keflavík
- 2021–2022: Saint-Quentin
- 2022–2023: Telekom Baskets Bonn
- 2023–2024: Baskets Oldenburg
- 2024: Napoli Basket
- 2024–2025: MHP Riesen Ludwigsburg
- 2024–2025: Anwil Włocławek
- 2025–present: London Lions

Career highlights
- Champions League champion (2023); Úrvalsdeild Foreign Player of the Year (2021); Peach Belt co-Player of the Year (2019); Peach Belt Defensive Player of the Year (2019); First-team All-Peach Belt (2019)

Deane Alexander Williams (born 23 September 1996) is a British professional basketball player for the London Lions of the British Super League Basketball (SLB) and the EuroCup. He played college basketball for the Augusta Jaguars where he was named the Peach Belt Co-Player of the Year and Defensive Player of the Year in 2019. In 2021, he was named the Úrvalsdeild Foreign Player of the Year.

== College career ==
Williams played college basketball for Augusta University from 2015 to 2019. He left the school eleventh on its all-time scoring list and finished in the top five in schools history in blocks and rebounds.

== Professional career ==
In the summer of 2019, Williams signed with Úrvalsdeild karla club Keflavík. During his first season, he averaged 15.6 points and 9.9 rebounds before the final game of the regular season and playoffs were canceled due to the 2020 coronavirus pandemic in Iceland. In April 2020, he re-signed with Keflavík. Following the season he was named the Úrvalsdeild Foreign Player of the Year.

In July 2021, Williams signed with LNB Pro B club Saint-Quentin.

On 28 June 2022 Williams signed with Telekom Baskets Bonn of the German Basketball Bundesliga.

On 18 July 2023 he signed with Baskets Oldenburg of the Basketball Bundesliga.

On 5 July 2024 he signed with Napoli Basket of the Italian Lega Basket Serie A (LBA).

On 11 November 2024, he signed with MHP Riesen Ludwigsburg of the Basketball Bundesliga (BBL).

On 13 March 2025, he signed with Anwil Włocławek of the Polish Basketball League (PLK).

== National team career ==
Williams played for the Great Britain national U-20 team in 2016.
