= Selom Mawugbe =

American basketball player

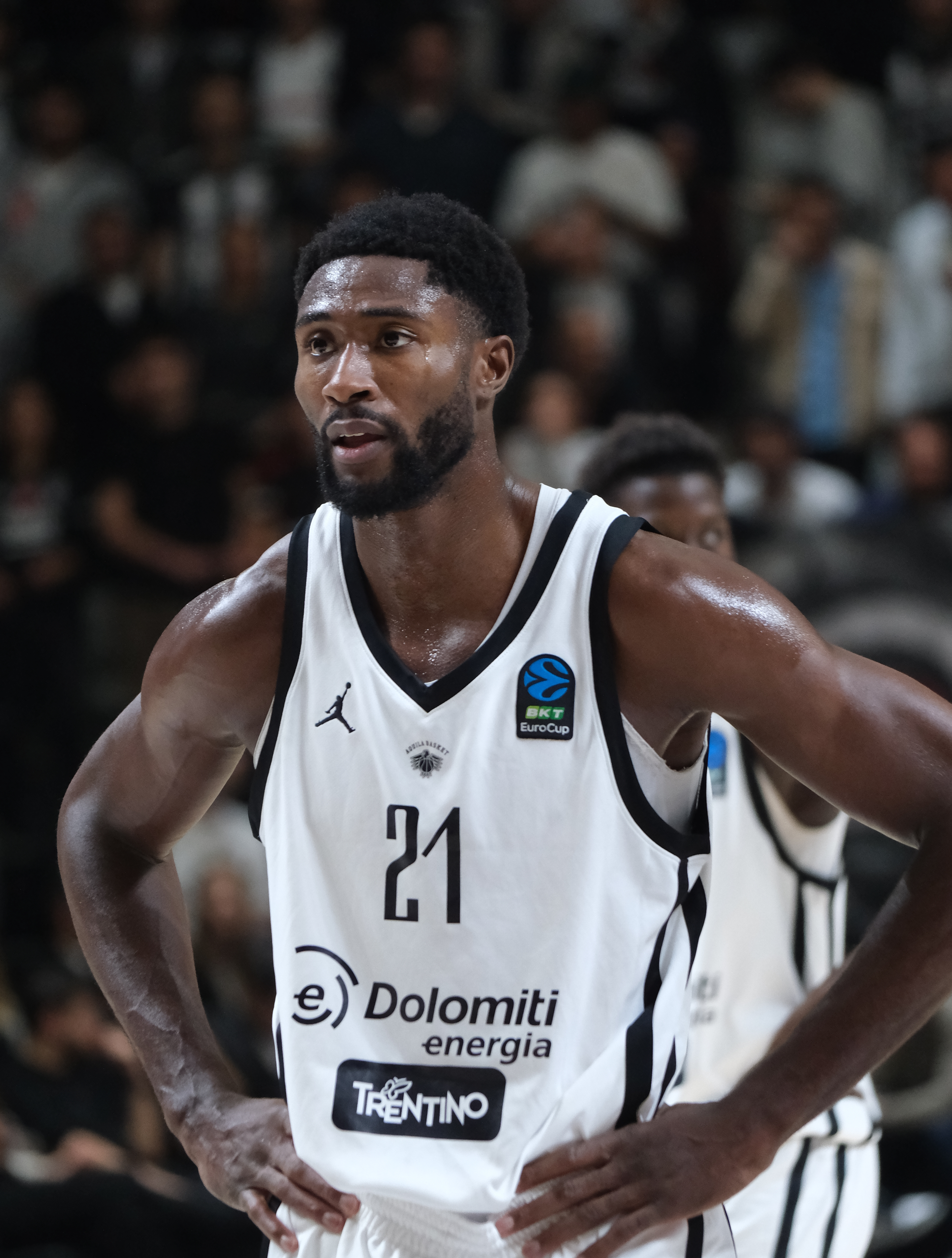
- Mawugbe with Aquila Trento in 2025

No. 21 – Dolomiti Energia Trento
- Position: Center
- League: LBA; EuroCup

Personal information
- Born: July 20, 1998 (age 28) Lancaster, California, U.S.
- Listed height: 6 ft 10 in (2.08 m)
- Listed weight: 230 lb (104 kg)

Career information
- High school: Canyon (Santa Clarita, California)
- College: Azusa Pacific (2016–2020)
- NBA draft: 2020: undrafted
- Playing career: 2020–present

Career history
- 2020–2022: Santa Cruz Warriors
- 2022–2023: Rostock Seawolves
- 2023–2024: Le Mans
- 2024: Manresa
- 2024–present: Aquila Trento

Career highlights
- Italian Cup winner (2025); Bundesliga Best Defender (2023); All-Bundesliga Second Team (2023); PacWest Player of the Year (2020); PacWest Defensive Player of the Year (2019)

Selom Kojo Mawugbe (born July 20, 1998) is an American professional basketball player for Dolomiti Energia Trento of the Italian Lega Basket Serie A (LBA) and the EuroCup. He played college basketball for the Azusa Pacific Cougars.

== Early life and high school career ==
Mawugbe was born in Lancaster, California to Ghanaian immigrant parents, moving to Santa Clarita, California at age eight. He attended Canyon High School, playing under coach Sean Delong. He grew up playing soccer and first began playing basketball at age 14. Mawugbe stood 6'1 as a freshman in high school and had a growth spurt, reaching 6'10. He was named first team All-Valley, and an All-Valley honorable mention as a junior. He committed to Azusa Pacific University, the only school to offer him a scholarship, which they did while recruiting one of his high school teammates.

== College career ==
Mawugbe studied biochemistry at Azusa Pacific University and emerged as an important player on their basketball team. He led the team with 40 blocks as a freshman and set a single-season Cougar record for blocks with 2.78 per game as a sophomore. That year, Mawugbe led the Pacific West Conference in blocked shots, finishing fifth in the nation in blocks with 89. In his junior year, he led the PacWest in blocked shots again with 107, finishing second in the nation in blocks with 3.45 blocks per game, breaking his own record that he set the year before. Mawaugbe also averaged 11.8 points and 8.0 rebounds per game. He was named PacWest Defensive Player of the Year. As a senior, Mawugbe led Division II in shooting percentage (71.7) and finished second in blocks per game (3.1), helping the Cougars to a PacWest championship before their season ended due to the cancellation of the NCAA Tournament. He averaged a double-double of 16.9 points and 10.4 rebounds per game, and was named PacWest Player of the Year. To help pay his bills, Mawugbe found work in the home and garden department at a Lowe's in Santa Clarita.

== Professional career ==
=== Santa Cruz Warriors (2021–2022) ===
On January 11, 2021, the Santa Cruz Warriors drafted Mawugbe with the 21st pick in the second round of the 2021 NBA G League draft. He was discovered by general manager Ryan Atkinson, who noticed his college highlights while reviewing film from several dozen prospects. Mawugbe averaged 5.3 points and 4.4 rebounds per game while shooting 83 percent from the field. He sat out the 108-96 playoff loss to the Lakeland Magic with a knee injury.

=== Rostock Seawolves (2022–2023) ===
Mawugbe saw the hardwood in 34 Bundesliga games (34 starts) to average 8.7 points, 6.6 rebounds and a league-leading 2.1 blocks per contest, while connecting on 74.1 percent from the field. He garnered Basketball Bundesliga Best Defender honours.

=== Le Mans Sarthe Basket (2023–2024) ===
On June 22, 2023, he put pen to paper on a contract with Le Mans Sarthe Basket of the French top-tier LNB Pro A.

=== Aquila Basket Trento (2024–present) ===
On June 22, 2024, he signed with Dolomiti Energia Trento of the Italian Lega Basket Serie A (LBA).

== Career statistics ==
Legend
GP	Games played	GS	Games started	MPG	Minutes per game
FG%	Field goal percentage	3P%	3-point field goal percentage	FT%	Free throw percentage
RPG	Rebounds per game	APG	Assists per game	SPG	Steals per game
BPG	Blocks per game	PPG	Points per game	**Bold**	Career high

=== NBA G League ===
==== Regular season ====
Year	Team	GP	GS	MPG	FG%	3P%	FT%	RPG	APG	SPG	BPG	PPG
2020–21	Santa Cruz	**12**	0	**19**	0.829	.000	**0.6**	**4.4**	**0.8**	**0.3**	2.5	5.3
