= Kevin Kokila =

French-Angolan basketball player (born 2001)

- Kokila with Virtus Bologna in 2026

No. 3 – Virtus Bologna
- Position: Center / power forward
- League: LBA; EuroLeague

Personal information
- Born: 3 September 2001 (age 25) Paris, France
- Listed height: 2.03 m (6 ft 8 in)
- Listed weight: 110 kg (243 lb)

Career information
- Playing career: 2021–present

Career history
- 2021–2022: CTC Lyon SO
- 2022–2026: JL Bourg
- 2026–present: Dubai Basketball
- 2026–present: →Virtus Bologna

Career highlights
- EuroCup champion (2026)
Medals
Men's basketball
Representing Angola
AfroBasket
| Gold medal – first place | 2025 Angola |

Kevin Kokila (born 3 September 2001) is a French-Angolan professional basketball player for Virtus Bologna of the Lega Basket Serie A (LBA) and the EuroLeague, on loan from Dubai Basketball. Born in Paris, France, he plays for the Angola national team. Kokila also holds dual citizenship in France and Angola.

== Youth career ==
Growing up in the Paris region, Kokila joined the ASVEL Basket junior program. He played for ASVEL's U18 team in the national championship.

== Professional career ==
=== CTC Lyon SO (2021–2022) ===
He made his senior debut with CTC Lyon SO in the Nationale Masculine 1 (NM1), the French third division league.

=== JL Bourg (2022–2026) ===
In 2022, he debuted for JL Bourg Basket in the LNB Élite.

=== Dubai Basketball (2026–present) ===
==== Loan to Virtus Bologna (2026–present) ====
On August 5, 2026, Kokila signed with Dubai Basketball of the ABA League and the EuroLeague, and was immediately loaned to Virtus Bologna of the Lega Basket Serie A (LBA) until the end of the 2026–27 season.

== National team career ==
Kokila plays with the Angola national team, and was a member of his country during the 2023 FIBA Basketball World Cup. He also played at the AfroBasket in 2025.
