= Sreten Radović =

Croatian basketball referee (born 1968)

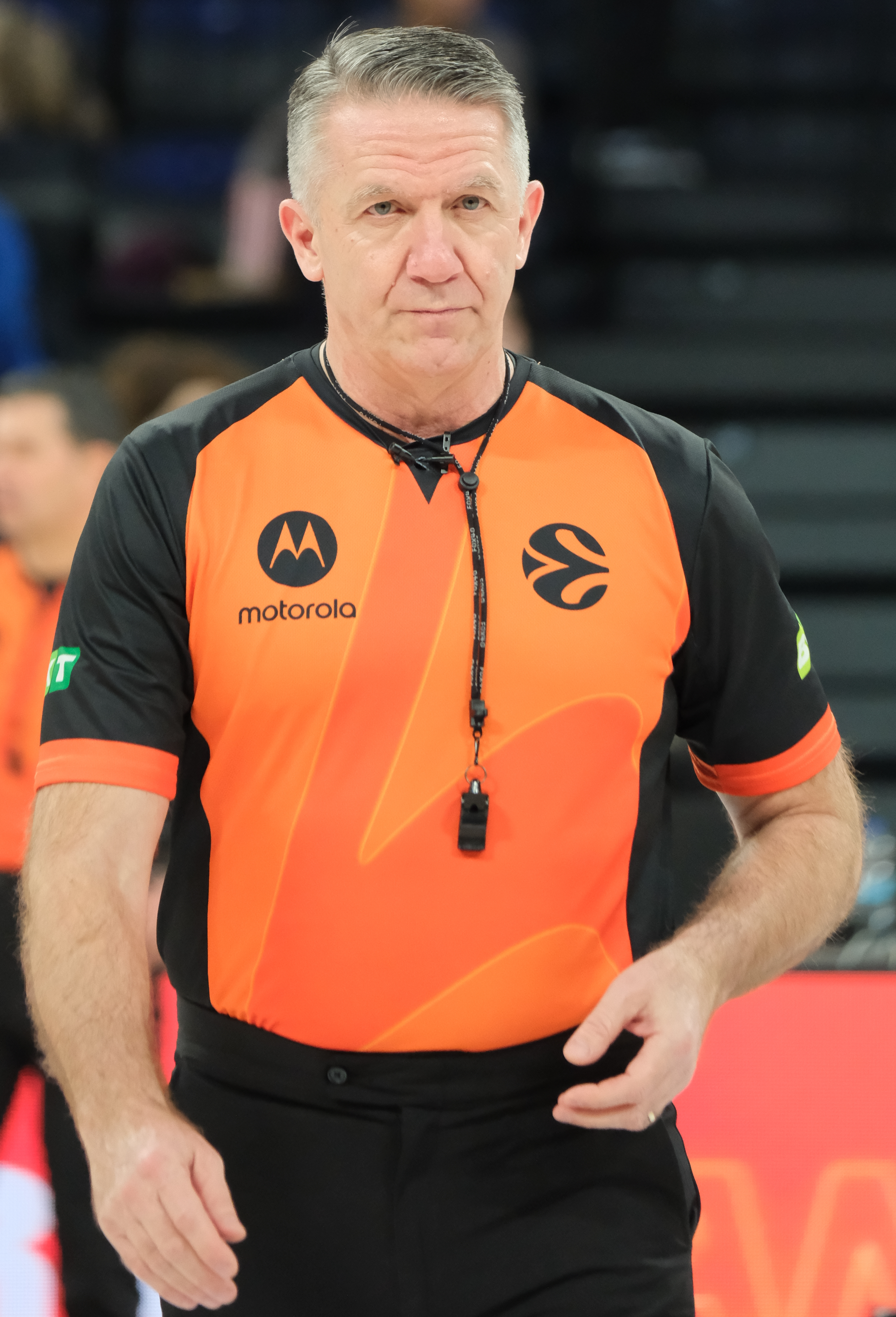

Personal information
- Born: June 28, 1968 (age 58) Croatia

Career information
- Position: Referee
- Officiating career: 1995–present

Career highlights
- FIBA international referee (2001–present); EuroLeague referee since 2007; Officiated at the 2016 Summer Olympics; Officiated at the 2014 FIBA Basketball World Cup; Officiated at the EuroBasket 2011 final; Multiple EuroLeague Final Four appearances; Long-time ABA League referee

Sreten Radović (Croatia, 28 June 1968) is a Croatian professional basketball referee who has officiated in major international competitions including the Olympic Games, FIBA World Cup, EuroBasket tournaments and the EuroLeague.

Radović has been a FIBA international referee since 2001 and has officiated in the EuroLeague since 2007. He has officiated numerous EuroLeague regular season, playoff and Final Four games, becoming one of the most experienced referees in European basketball.

== Refereeing career ==
Radović began refereeing in Croatia in 1995 after previously participating in several sports including swimming, water polo, karate and basketball. He became an international FIBA referee in 2001.

Among his major assignments was the final of the EuroBasket 2011 tournament and the semifinal of the 2014 FIBA Basketball World Cup in Spain. Radović also officiated at the 2016 Summer Olympics in Rio de Janeiro, including several men's and women's basketball games.

He has also been a long-time official in the ABA League, where he received a special award in 2020 for 20 years of service to the competition.

In the EuroLeague, Radović has officiated several high-profile games in EuroLeague, and has been selected several times for the EuroLeague Final Four. In May 2026, he was selected for his fifth EuroLeague Final Four appearance, and he officiated the championship game between Olympiakos and Real Madrid. This actually was the last game in his yearlong offitiating career.
