= Malik Osborne =

American basketball player (born 1998)

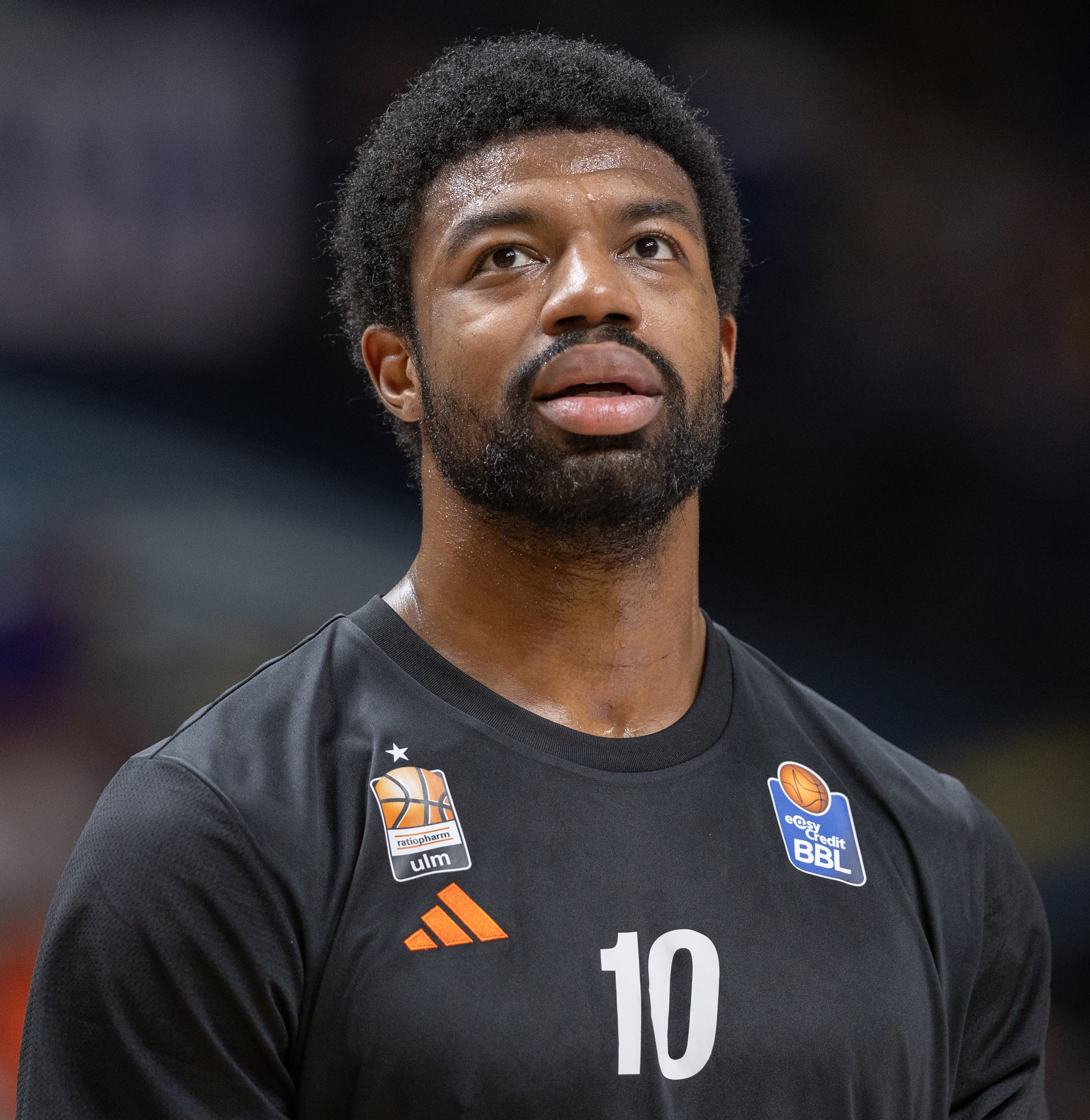
- Osborne with ratiopharm Ulm in 2025

Free Agent
- Position: Power forward / center

Personal information
- Born: April 9, 1998 (age 28) Matteson, Illinois, U.S.
- Listed height: 2.06 m (6 ft 9 in)
- Listed weight: 102 kg (225 lb)

Career information
- High school: Rich South (Richton Park, Illinois); Bosco Institute (Crown Point, Indiana)
- College: Rice (2017–2018); Florida State (2019–2022)
- NBA draft: 2022: undrafted
- Playing career: 2022–present

Career history
- 2022–2023: Kolossos Rodou
- 2023: Niners Chemnitz
- 2023–2024: Apollon Patras
- 2024–2025: Limoges CSP
- 2025: Rostock Seawolves
- 2025–2026: Ratiopharm Ulm

Malik Osborne (born April 9, 1998) is an American professional basketball player who last played for Ratiopharm Ulm of the German Basketball Bundesliga. After playing four years of college basketball at Rice and Florida State, Osborne entered the 2022 NBA draft, but he was not selected in the draft's two rounds.

== High school career ==
During high school, Osborne attended Rich South, in Richton Park, Illinois and Bosco Institute, in Crown Point, Indiana. In his last season at Bosco Institute, he averaged 14 points and 9 rebounds per game.

== College career ==
After high school, Osborne played college basketball at Rice, from 2017 to 2018. The following year, he was transferred to Florida State. In his senior year at Florida State, Osborne averaged 10 points and 6.9 rebounds per game. He was also the MVP in the Jacksonville Classic in 2022.

== Professional career ==
After failing to be drafted in the 2022 NBA draft, Osborne signed with Kolossos Rodou of the Greek Basket League. He finished the season with Niners Chemnitz in Germany.

On August 1, 2023, he joined Apollon Patras of the Greek Basket League. In 27 games, he averaged 10.2 points and 5.9 rebounds in 25 minutes of play.

On July 18, 2024, he signed with Limoges CSP of the LNB Pro A.

On January 13, 2025, he signed with Rostock Seawolves of the Basketball Bundesliga.

On July 22, 2025, he signed with Ratiopharm Ulm of the German Basketball Bundesliga.
