= Jake Forrester =

American basketball player (born 1999)

No. 8 – Iraklis Thessaloniki
- Position: Center / power forward
- League: Greek Basketball League; FIBA Europe Cup

Personal information
- Born: January 1, 1999 (age 27) West Chester, Pennsylvania, U.S.
- Listed height: 6 ft 9.5 in (2.07 m)
- Listed weight: 225 lb (102 kg)

Career information
- High school: Westtown School (West Chester, Pennsylvania)
- College: Indiana (2018–2019); Temple (2019–2022); Saint Louis (2022–2023)
- NBA draft: 2023: undrafted
- Playing career: 2023–present

Career history
- 2023–2024: Artland Dragons
- 2024–2025: PAOK Thessaloniki
- 2025–2026: Aris Thessaloniki
- 2026: SIG Strasbourg
- 2026: Promitheas Patras
- 2026–present: Iraklis Thessaloniki

Jakob Dwight "Jake" Forrester (born January 1, 1999) is an American professional basketball player for Iraklis Thessaloniki of the Greek Basketball League (GBL) and the FIBA Europe Cup. He primarily plays at the center position and can also play power forward. He played college basketball for the Indiana Hoosiers, Temple Owls and Saint Louis Billikens.

== High school career ==
Forrester attended Westtown School in Pennsylvania. As a senior, he averaged 12.2 points and 9.0 rebounds per game while helping Westtown to a 23–10 record and its fifth consecutive Friends Schools League championship.

As a junior, he helped Westtown finish 32–2 and win the Pennsylvania Independent Schools Athletic Association championship. He was also named first-team all-conference. Forrester finished his high school career with 1,392 points and played AAU basketball for the PSA Cardinals.

He was ranked among the top 150 prospects of the 2018 recruiting class by both Rivals and 247Sports before committing to Indiana.

== College career ==
=== Indiana (2018–2019) ===
Forrester began his college career at Indiana University during the 2018–19 season. As a freshman, he appeared in 13 games, averaging 2.1 points and 1.3 rebounds while shooting 54.5 percent from the field.

Following the season, he transferred from Indiana to Temple University.

=== Temple (2019–2022) ===
Forrester transferred to Temple, where he received an NCAA waiver allowing him to become immediately eligible during the 2019–20 season.

During the 2020–21 season, Forrester emerged as one of Temple's main frontcourt players. He finished third on the team in scoring with 9.3 points per game and led the Owls with 6.4 rebounds per game. He also shot 56.7 percent from the field, ranking among the leaders of the American Athletic Conference.

He spent three seasons with Temple before transferring to Saint Louis for his final year of college eligibility.

=== Saint Louis (2022–2023) ===
Forrester joined the Saint Louis Billikens for the 2022–23 season. He appeared in all 33 games and averaged 6.7 points and 4.9 rebounds per game while shooting 56.8 percent from the field. He ranked second on the team in both rebounding and blocked shots, recording 30 blocks.

He recorded a double-double with 14 points and 10 rebounds against VCU and collected a season-high 11 rebounds against Davidson.

Over his five-year college career at Indiana, Temple and Saint Louis, Forrester appeared in 103 games and averaged 6.5 points and 4.2 rebounds while shooting 54.9 percent from the field.

== Professional career ==
=== Artland Dragons (2023–2024) ===
On July 26, 2023, Forrester signed with the Artland Dragons of the German ProA to begin his professional career.

Forrester immediately became an important part of the Dragons' frontcourt. During the 2023–24 season, he appeared in 34 league games and averaged 12.3 points and 6.1 rebounds in approximately 20 minutes per game, while shooting 60.2 percent on two-point field goals.

Among his best performances was a 24-point, seven-rebound outing in a 101–80 victory over Nürnberg in April 2024. Three days later, he scored 27 points in a 98–88 road victory against Rasta Vechta II.

=== PAOK Thessaloniki (2024–2025) ===
On July 7, 2024, Forrester signed with PAOK Thessaloniki for the 2024–25 season, marking his first season in a top-tier European domestic league.

Forrester became a regular member of PAOK's frontcourt rotation. In the 2024–25 Greek Basket League, he averaged 8.2 points and 4.5 rebounds per game.

He also played an important role in PAOK's run to the 2024–25 FIBA Europe Cup Final. In 18 games in the competition, Forrester averaged 7.9 points and 4.7 rebounds per game. PAOK eventually finished as runners-up after losing the two-legged final to Bilbao Basket.

=== Aris Thessaloniki (2025–2026) ===
On August 1, 2025, Forrester remained in Thessaloniki and signed with PAOK's city rivals Aris for the 2025–26 season. The agreement included a club option for an additional season.

Forrester competed with Aris in both the Greek Basketball League and the EuroCup. In EuroCup play, he averaged 5.0 points and 3.3 rebounds per game. He remained part of Aris's regular frontcourt rotation through the end of the season and competed in the Greek League playoffs.

=== SIG Strasbourg (2026) ===
On July 7, 2026, Forrester signed with SIG Strasbourg ahead of the 2026–27 season, moving to the French LNB Élite. The move ended his two-year spell in Thessaloniki, where he had played consecutive seasons for rivals PAOK and Aris.

Strasbourg sporting director Nicola Alberani described Forrester as a player well suited to the team's system, emphasizing his defense, athleticism and basketball intelligence, while head coach Jānis Gailītis highlighted his ability to contribute to team play.

On September 30, 2026, Forrester and SIG Strasbourg parted ways.

=== Promitheas Patras (2026) ===
On September 30, 2026, Forrester signed with Promitheas Patras of the Greek Basketball League (GBL) and the Basketball Champions League (BCL).

=== Iraklis Thessaloniki (2026–present) ===
On November 9, 2026, Forrester signed with Iraklis Thessaloniki of the Greek Basketball League (GBL) and the FIBA Europe Cup.

== Career statistics ==
=== College ===
Year	Team	GP	PPG	RPG	APG
2018–19	Indiana	13	2.1	1.3	0.0
2019–20	Temple	26	7.5	3.8	0.3
2020–21	Temple	16	9.3	6.4	0.1
2021–22	Temple	15	5.5	3.9	0.3
2022–23	Saint Louis	33	6.7	4.9	0.8

== Personal life ==
Forrester is the son of Dwight and Colleen Forrester.
