= 2016–17 EuroCup Basketball Playoffs =

The 2016–17 EuroCup Basketball Playoffs were played from 28 February to 31 March or 5 April with the second or third leg, if necessary, of the 2017 EuroCup Finals, to decide the champions of the 2016–17 EuroCup Basketball. Eight teams competed in the playoffs.

Times up to 25 March 2017 (quarterfinals and semifinals) were CET (UTC+1), thereafter (finals) times were CEST (UTC+2).

== Format ==
In the playoffs, teams played against each other must win two games to win the series. Thus, if one team wins two games before all three games have been played, the game that remains is omitted. The team that finished in the higher Top 16 place will play the first and the third (if it is necessary) legs of the series at home. The playoffs involves the eight teams which qualified as winners and runners-up of each of the four groups in the Top 16.

== Qualified teams ==
| Group | Winners (Seeded in quarterfinals) | Runners-up (Unseeded in quarterfinals) |
|---|---|---|
| E | (Russia) Lokomotiv Kuban | (Spain) Herbalife Gran Canaria |
| F | (Germany) Bayern Munich | (Russia) Khimki |
| G | (Israel) Hapoel Jerusalem | (Russia) Zenit |
| H | (Spain) Valencia Basket | (Spain) Unicaja |

=== Standings ===
| Pos | Grp | Team | Pld | W | L | PF | PA | PD | Seeding |
|---|---|---|---|---|---|---|---|---|---|
| 1 | H | (Spain) Valencia Basket | 6 | 6 | 0 | 528 | 429 | +99 | Seeded in quarterfinals |
| 2 | F | (Germany) Bayern Munich | 6 | 6 | 0 | 479 | 430 | +49 | Seeded in quarterfinals |
| 3 | E | (Russia) Lokomotiv Kuban | 6 | 5 | 1 | 484 | 424 | +60 | Seeded in quarterfinals |
| 4 | G | (Israel) Hapoel Jerusalem | 6 | 5 | 1 | 521 | 484 | +37 | Seeded in quarterfinals |
| 5 | E | (Spain) Herbalife Gran Canaria | 6 | 4 | 2 | 491 | 465 | +26 | Unseeded in quarterfinals |
| 6 | F | (Russia) Khimki | 6 | 4 | 2 | 503 | 493 | +10 | Unseeded in quarterfinals |
| 7 | G | (Russia) Zenit | 6 | 3 | 3 | 549 | 522 | +27 | Unseeded in quarterfinals |
| 8 | H | (Spain) Unicaja | 6 | 3 | 3 | 436 | 443 | −7 | Unseeded in quarterfinals |

Source: EuroCup Basketball

== Bracket ==
Quarterfinals
(Russia) Lokomotiv Kuban | 75 | 88
(Russia) Zenit | 52 | 77
(Germany) Bayern Munich | 91 | 67 | 69
(Spain) Unicaja | 82 | 82 | 74
(Israel) Hapoel Jerusalem | 87 | 85
(Spain) Herbalife Gran Canaria | 67 | 79
(Spain) Valencia Basket | 88 | 74 | 92
(Russia) Khimki | 82 | 98 | 76

Semifinals
(Russia) Lokomotiv Kuban | 57 | 63
(Spain) Unicaja | 73 | 74
(Israel) Hapoel Jerusalem | 68 | 79 | 75
(Spain) Valencia Basket | 83 | 66 | 90

Finals
(Spain) Unicaja | 62 | 79 | 63
(Spain) Valencia Basket | 68 | 71 | 58

== Quarterfinals ==
The first legs were played on 28 February, the second legs on 3 March 2017 and the third legs, if necessary, on 8 March 2017.

| Team 1 | Series | Team 2 | Game 1 | Game 2 | Game 3 |
|---|---|---|---|---|---|
| Lokomotiv Kuban (Russia) | 2–0 | (Russia) Zenit | 75–52 | 88–77 | |
| Bayern Munich (Germany) | 1–2 | (Spain) Unicaja | 91–82 | 67–82 | 69–74 |
| Hapoel Jerusalem (Israel) | 2–0 | (Spain) Herbalife Gran Canaria | 87–67 | 85–79 | |
| Valencia Basket (Spain) | 2–1 | (Russia) Khimki | 88–82 | 74–98 | 92–76 |

=== First leg ===
| 28 February 2017 | Lokomotiv Kuban (Russia) | 75–52 (Series: 1–0) | (Russia) Zenit | Krasnodar |
| 18:00 | Scoring by quarter: 23–17, 17–13, 12–10, 23–12 |
| | Pts: Collins, Vougioukas 12; Rebs: Vougioukas 7 Asts: Janning, Rochestie 5 PIR: Vougioukas 17 | Boxscore | Pts: Karasev, Mbakwe 12; Rebs: Mbakwe 5 Asts: Karasev 4 PIR: Mbakwe 18 | Arena: Basket Hall; Attendance: 4,223; Referees: Emin Moğulkoç (TUR), Tomislav Hordov (CRO), David Romano (ISR) |

| 28 February 2017 | Hapoel Jerusalem (Israel) | 87–67 (Series: 1–0) | (Spain) Herbalife Gran Canaria | Jerusalem |
| 19:15 | Scoring by quarter: 16–17, 23–21, 25–19, 23–10 |
| | Pts: Dyson 20; Rebs: Peterson 8 Asts: Jerrells 7 PIR: Dyson 21 | Boxscore | Pts: McCalebb 12; Rebs: three players 5 Asts: Oliver 6 PIR: Báez 14 | Arena: Pais Arena; Attendance: 8,446; Referees: Sreten Radović (CRO), Matej Boltauzer (SLO), Oļegs Latiševs (LAT) |

| 28 February 2017 | Bayern Munich (Germany) | 91–82 (Series: 1–0) | (Spain) Unicaja | Munich |
| 20:00 | Scoring by quarter: 21–18, 21–18, 24–20, 25–26 |
| | Pts: Zirbes 15; Rebs: Kleber 6 Asts: Johnson 5 PIR: Redding 18 | Boxscore | Pts: Musli 15; Rebs: three players 4 Asts: Nedović 5 PIR: Brooks 19 | Arena: Audi Dome; Attendance: 6,265; Referees: Fernando Rocha (POR), Ioannis Foufis (GRE), Nick van den Broeck (BEL) |

| 28 February 2017 | Valencia Basket (Spain) | 88–82 (Series: 1–0) | (Russia) Khimki | Valencia |
| 20:45 | Scoring by quarter: 27–24, 32–18, 13–20, 16–20 |
| | Pts: San Emeterio 17; Rebs: Dubljević 11; Asts: San Emeterio 5 PIR: San Emeterio 29 | Boxscore | Pts: Shved 24; Rebs: Rowland, Shved 5 Asts: Rowland, Shved 7 PIR: Shved 24 | Arena: Fuente de San Luis; Attendance: 6,629; Referees: Milivoje Jovčić (SRB), Robert Vyklický (CZE), Renaud Geller (BEL) |

=== Second leg ===
| 3 March 2017 | Khimki (Russia) | 98–74 (Series: 1–1) | (Spain) Valencia Basket | Khimki |
| 17:30 | Scoring by quarter: 18–15, 27–26, 24–21, 29–12 |
| | Pts: Pullen 18; Rebs: Shved 8 Asts: Shved 11; PIR: Shved 22 | Boxscore | Pts: Sastre 18; Rebs: Thomas 7 Asts: San Emeterio 6 PIR: Sastre, Thomas 15 | Arena: Basketball Center of Moscow Region; Attendance: 3,500; Referees: Emin Moğulkoç (TUR), Tomislav Hordov (CRO), Igor Mitrovski (MKD) |

| 3 March 2017 | Zenit (Russia) | 77–88 (Series: 0–2) | (Russia) Lokomotiv Kuban | Saint Petersburg |
| 18:00 | Scoring by quarter: 10–25, 19–19, 27–23, 21–21 |
| | Pts: Marković 21; Rebs: Timma, Valiev 5 Asts: Marković 12; PIR: Marković 23 | Boxscore | Pts: Jones 17; Rebs: Ivlev, Jones 9 Asts: Rochestie 6 PIR: Zubkov 16 | Arena: Yubileyny Arena; Attendance: 4,183; Referees: Seffi Semmesh (ISR), Ioannis Foufis (GRE), Ingus Baumanis (LAT) |

| 3 March 2017 | Unicaja (Spain) | 82–67 (Series: 1–1) | (Germany) Bayern Munich | Málaga |
| 20:45 | Scoring by quarter: 17–19, 24–12, 28–25, 13–11 |
| | Pts: Musli 15; Rebs: three players 4 Asts: Nedović 5 PIR: Musli 16 | Boxscore | Pts: Gavel, Johnson 10; Rebs: Đedović 6 Asts: Đedović 6 PIR: Đedović 14 | Arena: Martín Carpena; Attendance: 8,464; Referees: Sreten Radović (CRO), Jakub Zamojski (POL), Aare Halliko (EST) |

| 3 March 2017 | Herbalife Gran Canaria (Spain) | 79–85 (Series: 0–2) | (Israel) Hapoel Jerusalem | Las Palmas |
| 21:30 | Scoring by quarter: 19–33, 22–17, 18–20, 20–15 |
| | Pts: Salin 17; Rebs: O'Neale 10; Asts: O'Neale 6 PIR: O'Neale 16 | Boxscore | Pts: Jerrells 23; Rebs: Stoudemire 8 Asts: Halperin 3 PIR: Stoudemire 20 | Arena: Gran Canaria Arena; Attendance: 5,202; Referees: Milivoje Jovčić (SRB), Robert Viklický (CZE), Siniša Herceg (CRO) |

=== Third leg ===
| 8 March 2017 | Bayern Munich (Germany) | 69–74 (Series: 1–2) | (Spain) Unicaja | Munich |
| 20:00 | Scoring by quarter: 10–17, 17–17, 17–18, 25–22 |
| | Pts: Redding 15; Rebs: Kleber 10; Asts: Gavel 4 PIR: Kleber 17 | Boxscore | Pts: Nedović 21; Rebs: Waczyński 9 Asts: Nedović 4 PIR: Musli 22 | Arena: Audi Dome; Attendance: 6,014; Referees: Luigi Lamonica (ITA), Petros Papapetrou (GRE), Sérgio Silva (POR) |

| 8 March 2017 | Valencia Basket (Spain) | 92–76 (Series: 2–1) | (Russia) Khimki | Valencia |
| 20:45 | Scoring by quarter: 15–19, 24–15, 27–20, 26–22 |
| | Pts: Van Rossom 17; Rebs: Dubljević 11; Asts: Sastre 9 PIR: Dubljević 26 | Boxscore | Pts: Shved 21; Rebs: Hummel 5 Asts: Rowland, Shved 4 PIR: Shved 18 | Arena: Fuente de San Luis; Attendance: 7,521; Referees: Ioannis Foufis (GRE), Siniša Herceg (CRO), Clemens Fritz (GER) |

== Semifinals ==
The first legs were played on 14 March, the second legs on 17 March, and the third legs, if necessary, on 22 March 2017.

| Team 1 | Series | Team 2 | Game 1 | Game 2 | Game 3 |
|---|---|---|---|---|---|
| Lokomotiv Kuban (Russia) | 0–2 | (Spain) Unicaja | 57–73 | 63–74 | |
| Valencia Basket (Spain) | 2–1 | (Israel) Hapoel Jerusalem | 83–68 | 66–79 | 90–75 |

=== First leg ===
| 14 March 2017 | Lokomotiv Kuban (Russia) | 57–73 (Series: 0–1) | (Spain) Unicaja | Krasnodar |
| 18:00 | Scoring by quarter: 19–15, 12–18, 13–15, 13–25 |
| | Pts: Jones 17; Rebs: Vougioukas 7 Asts: Rochestie 6 PIR: Rochestie 17 | Boxscore | Pts: Brooks 18; Rebs: Omić 7 Asts: Fogg 3 PIR: Brooks 20 | Arena: Basket Hall; Attendance: 5,744; Referees: Borys Ryzhyk (UKR), Emin Moğulkoç (TUR), Tomasz Trawicki (POL) |

| 14 March 2017 | Valencia Basket (Spain) | 83–68 (Series: 1–0) | (Israel) Hapoel Jerusalem | Valencia |
| 20:30 | Scoring by quarter: 20–19, 16–16, 19–13, 28–20 |
| | Pts: San Emeterio 21; Rebs: Dubljević 10; Asts: Martínez 6 PIR: San Emeterio 31 | Boxscore | Pts: Kinsey 22; Rebs: Stoudemire 8 Asts: Jerrells 5 PIR: Kinsey 25 | Arena: Fuente de San Luis; Attendance: 6,378; Referees: Fernando Rocha (POR), Aare Halliko (EST), Jurgis Laurinavičius (LTU) |

=== Second leg ===
| 17 March 2017 | Hapoel Jerusalem (Israel) | 79–66 (Series: 1–1) | (Spain) Valencia Basket | Jerusalem |
| 13:00 | Scoring by quarter: 24–14, 17–23, 12–20, 26–9 |
| | Pts: Kinsey 18; Rebs: Stoudemire 8 Asts: Jerrells 5 PIR: Kinsey 20 | Boxscore | Pts: Martínez 22; Rebs: Dubljević 9 Asts: Van Rossom 3 PIR: Martínez 24 | Arena: Pais Arena; Attendance: 10,091; Referees: Borys Ryzhyk (UKR), Sašo Petek (SLO), Uroš Obrknežević (SRB) |

| 17 March 2017 | Unicaja (Spain) | 74–63 (Series: 2–0) | (Russia) Lokomotiv Kuban | Málaga |
| 20:45 | Scoring by quarter: 27–11, 10–13, 16–18, 21–21 |
| | Pts: Nedović 21; Rebs: three players 6 Asts: Nedović 4 PIR: Nedović 23 | Boxscore | Pts: Jones 17; Rebs: Jones 10; Asts: Collins, Rochestie 5 PIR: Jones 19 | Arena: Martín Carpena; Attendance: 10,361; Referees: Carmelo Paternicò (ITA), Aare Halliko (EST), Ingus Baumanis (LAT) |

=== Third leg ===
| 22 March 2017 | Valencia Basket (Spain) | 90–75 (Series: 2–1) | (Israel) Hapoel Jerusalem | Valencia |
| 20:30 | Scoring by quarter: 21–17, 23–15, 31–18, 15–25 |
| | Pts: San Emeterio 15; Rebs: Dubljević 7 Asts: Martínez, San Emeterio 4 PIR: San Emeterio 21 | Boxscore | Pts: Jerrells 19; Rebs: Eliyahu 5 Asts: three players 3 PIR: Stoudemire 21 | Arena: Fuente de San Luis; Attendance: 7,203; Referees: Sreten Radović (CRO), Piotr Pastusiak (POL), Ingus Baumanis (LAT) |

== Finals ==
The first leg were played on 28 March, the second leg on 31 March, and the third leg, if necessary, on 5 April 2017.

| Team 1 | Series | Team 2 | Game 1 | Game 2 | Game 3 |
|---|---|---|---|---|---|
| Valencia Basket (Spain) | 1–2 | (Spain) Unicaja | 68–62 | 71–79 | 58–63 |

=== First leg ===
| 28 March 2017 | Valencia Basket (Spain) | 68–62 (Series: 1–0) | (Spain) Unicaja | Valencia |
| 20:30 | Scoring by quarter: 20–20, 15–15, 15–13, 18–14 |
| | Pts: Dubljević 14; Rebs: Dubljević 8 Asts: Van Rossom 6 PIR: Dubljević 23 | Boxscore | Pts: Brooks 11; Rebs: Omić 12; Asts: Smith 4 PIR: Omić 18 | Arena: Fuente de San Luis; Attendance: 7,583; Referees: Luigi Lamonica (ITA), Oļegs Latiševs (LAT), Spiros Gkontas (GRE) |

=== Second leg ===
| 31 March 2017 | Unicaja (Spain) | 79–71 (Series: 1–1) | (Spain) Valencia Basket | Málaga |
| 21:00 | Scoring by quarter: 21–16, 22–18, 21–17, 15–20 |
| | Pts: Smith 20; Rebs: Omić 10; Asts: Díaz 5 PIR: Smith 24 | Boxscore | Pts: Vives 14; Rebs: Dubljević 5 Asts: Van Rossom 5 PIR: Van Rossom 15 | Arena: Martín Carpena; Attendance: 10,367; Referees: Damir Javor (SLO), Ilija Belošević (SRB), Anne Panther (GER) |

=== Third leg ===
| 5 April 2017 | Valencia Basket (Spain) | 58–63 (Series: 1–2) | (Spain) Unicaja | Valencia |
| 20:30 | Scoring by quarter: 22–18, 11–12, 21–13, 4–20 |
| | Pts: Dubljević 16; Rebs: Dubljević 6 Asts: Vives 5 PIR: Dubljević 19 | Boxscore | Pts: Díaz 12; Rebs: Waczyński 6 Asts: Nedović 4 PIR: Díaz, Suárez 12 | Arena: Fuente de San Luis; Attendance: 7,813; Referees: Sreten Radović (CRO), Borys Ryzhyk (UKR), Mario Majkić (SLO) |
