= 2017 EuroCup Finals =

European club basketball fixture

2017 EuroCup finals
- Event: 2016–17 EuroCup Basketball
Valencia Basket	Unicaja
(Spain)	(Spain)
1	2

First leg
Valencia Basket	Unicaja
68	62
- Date: 28 March 2017
- Venue: Fuente de San Luis, Valencia
- MVP: Alberto Díaz (Unicaja)
- Attendance: 7,583

Second leg
Unicaja	Valencia Basket
79	71
- Date: 31 March 2017
- Venue: Martín Carpena, Málaga
- Attendance: 10,367

Third leg
Valencia Basket	Unicaja
58	63
- Date: 5 April 2017
- Venue: Fuente de San Luis, Valencia
- Attendance: 7,813

The 2017 EuroCup finals were the concluding games of the 2016–17 EuroCup season, the 15th season of Europe's secondary club basketball tournament organised by Euroleague Basketball, the ninth season since it was renamed from the ULEB Cup to the EuroCup, and the first season under the title sponsorship name of 7DAYS. The first leg was played at the Fuente de San Luis in Valencia, Spain, the second leg was played at the Martín Carpena in Málaga, Spain, on 31 March 2017 and the third leg was played at the Fuente de San Luis in Valencia, Spain, between Spanish sides Unicaja and Valencia Basket.

It was the first ever Finals appearance ever of Unicaja, after 15 seasons in EuroLeague and it was the third ever final appearance in any European competition after two consecutive finals in Korać Cup. For Valencia Basket, it was its fifth Finals appearance, after winning three of the previous four. Also, it was the seventh ever final appearance, including two losses in finals of the Saporta Cup. It was also the second EuroCup Finals that both finalists were from the same country.

Unicaja won the Finals 1–2, and qualified for the 2017–18 EuroLeague.

== Venues ==
The Fuente de San Luis was the first leg venue and, if necessary, the third leg venue as Valencia Basket venue. The arena was originally built in 1983. Valencia Basket started to play its games in the arena in 1987. The arena was also used as the home arena of the women's basketball team, Ros Casares Valencia, and the futsal team Valencia FS. In April 2010, La Fonteta hosted the 2009–10 EuroLeague Women Final Four, where Ros Casares Valencia was defeated in the final by Spartak Moscow Region. In 2016, Valencia Basket financed the renovation of the arena with €500,000, and also installed a new €150,000 center-hung scoreboard.

The Martín Carpena was the second leg venue as Unicaja venue. Martín Carpena arena opened in 1999. The arena originally had a seating capacity of 9,743 spectators, and an area of around 22,000 square meters. In 2007, a project was proposed to expand the capacity of the venue to 17,000 spectators, due to the high demand for seats and tickets by fans of Unicaja. Ultimately, the expansion project was approved, but to a new capacity of 13,000 spectators, rather than the originally planned 17,000. The expansion project was then scheduled to be completed in separate phases. The first expansion phase, which was completed in 2010, increased the seating capacity from 9,743 to 11,300.

Valencia	2017 EuroCup Finals (Europe)	Málaga
Fuente de San Luis	2017 EuroCup Finals (Europe)	Martín Carpena
Capacity: 8,500	2017 EuroCup Finals (Europe)	Capacity: 11,300

== Road to the Finals ==
Note: In the table, the score of the finalist is given first (H = home; A = away).

(Spain) Valencia Basket					Round	(Spain) Unicaja				
1st place (7–1) (Group D)					Regular season	4th place (4–4) (Group C)				
1st place (6–0) (Group H)					Top 16	2nd place (3–3) (Group H)				
Opponent	Series	1st leg	2nd leg	3rd leg	Playoffs	Opponent	Series	1st leg	2nd leg	3rd leg
(Russia) Khimki	2–1	88–82 (H)	74–98 (A)	92–76 (H)	Quarterfinals	(Germany) Bayern Munich	2–1	82–91 (A)	82–67 (H)	74–69 (A)
(Israel) Hapoel Jerusalem	2–1	83–68 (H)	66–79 (A)	90–75 (H)	Semifinals	(Russia) Lokomotiv Kuban	2–0	73–57 (A)	74–63 (H)	

== First leg ==
Bojan Dubljević became the all-time leading scorer in EuroCup history in the second quarter when he passed the mark of 1,189 which was set by teammate Rafa Martínez.

28 March 2017	Valencia Basket (Spain)	68–62 (Series: 1–0)	(Spain) Unicaja	Valencia
20:30	Scoring by quarter: 20–20, 15–15, 15–13, 18–14
	Pts: Dubljević 14; Rebs: Dubljević 8 Asts: Van Rossom 6 PIR: Dubljević 23	Boxscore	Pts: Brooks 11; Rebs: Omić 12; Asts: Smith 4 PIR: Omić 18	Arena: Fuente de San Luis; Attendance: 7,583; Referees: Luigi Lamonica (ITA), Oļegs Latiševs (LAT), Spiros Gkontas (GRE)

Starters:			Pts	Reb	Ast
PG	9	(Belgium) Sam van Rossom	5	3	6
SG	17	(Spain) Rafa Martínez	4	0	1
SF	10	(Central African Republic) Romain Sato	7	2	0
PF	43	(United States) Luke Sikma	5	5	2
C	14	(Montenegro) Bojan Dubljević	14	8	1
Reserves:					
PF	0	(United States) Will Thomas	8	6	0
PG	16	(Spain) Guillem Vives	3	0	1
C	18	(Spain) Pierre Oriola	5	3	0
SF	19	(Spain) Fernando San Emeterio	4	4	3
SF	30	(Spain) Joan Sastre	13	2	3
PG	42	(Spain) Luis Ferrando	DNP		
SF	52	(Croatia) Emil Savić	DNP		
Head coach:
(Spain) Pedro Martínez

Valencia Basket	Unicaja

Starters:			Pts	Reb	Ast
PG	9	(Spain) Alberto Díaz	3	0	2
SG	16	(Serbia) Nemanja Nedović	5	1	2
SF	21	(Poland) Adam Waczyński	3	1	0
PF	23	(United States) Jeff Brooks	11	4	2
C	92	(Slovenia) Alen Omić	8	12	0
Reserves:					
C	2	(Democratic Republic of the Congo) Viny Okouo	5	4	0
PG	8	(United States) Kyle Fogg	8	0	2
SF	11	(Spain) Dani Díez	7	3	1
SG	15	(United States) Jamar Smith	3	4	4
PG	20	(Croatia) Oliver Lafayette	4	0	2
SF	43	(Spain) Carlos Suárez	5	2	1
Head coach:
(Spain) Joan Plaza

== Second leg ==
31 March 2017	Unicaja (Spain)	79–71 (Series: 1–1)	(Spain) Valencia Basket	Málaga
21:00	Scoring by quarter: 21–16, 22–18, 21–17, 15–20
	Pts: Smith 20; Rebs: Omić 10; Asts: Díaz 5 PIR: Smith 24	Boxscore	Pts: Vives 14; Rebs: Dubljević 5 Asts: Van Rossom 5 PIR: Van Rossom 15	Arena: Martín Carpena; Attendance: 10,367; Referees: Damir Javor (SLO), Ilija Belošević (SRB), Anne Panther (GER)

Starters:			Pts	Reb	Ast
PG	9	(Spain) Alberto Díaz	7	4	5
SG	16	(Serbia) Nemanja Nedović	5	2	4
SF	21	(Poland) Adam Waczyński	6	3	1
PF	23	(United States) Jeff Brooks	9	4	0
C	92	(Slovenia) Alen Omić	12	10	0
Reserves:					
C	2	(Democratic Republic of the Congo) Viny Okouo	4	2	0
PG	8	(United States) Kyle Fogg	6	3	2
SF	11	(Spain) Dani Díez	4	1	0
SG	15	(United States) Jamar Smith	20	4	4
PG	20	(Croatia) Oliver Lafayette	DNP		
SF	43	(Spain) Carlos Suárez	6	3	3
Head coach:
(Spain) Joan Plaza

Unicaja	Valencia Basket

Starters:			Pts	Reb	Ast
PG	9	(Belgium) Sam van Rossom	11	2	5
SG	19	(Spain) Fernando San Emeterio	9	2	0
SF	30	(Spain) Joan Sastre	3	1	3
PF	43	(United States) Luke Sikma	2	3	2
C	14	(Montenegro) Bojan Dubljević	11	5	1
Reserves:					
PF	0	(United States) Will Thomas	2	3	0
PG	8	(France) Antoine Diot	DNP		
SF	10	(Central African Republic) Romain Sato	9	1	1
PG	16	(Spain) Guillem Vives	14	2	2
SG	17	(Spain) Rafa Martínez	8	2	4
C	18	(Spain) Pierre Oriola	2	0	0
PG	42	(Spain) Luis Ferrando	DNP		
Head coach:
(Spain) Pedro Martínez

== Third leg ==
Alen Omić was disqualified in the third quarter for entering the court to prevent an altercation. In the last quarter, Unicaja was trailing by 13 when it came back with an 18–0 run to win the title.

Unicaja was the first newcomer to win the EuroCup title since Hapoel Jerusalem in 2003–04. Joan Plaza became the third coach to have won multiple EuroCup titles.

5 April 2017	Valencia Basket (Spain)	58–63 (Series: 1–2)	(Spain) Unicaja	Valencia
20:30	Scoring by quarter: 22–18, 11–12, 21–13, 4–20
	Pts: Dubljević 16; Rebs: Dubljević 6 Asts: Vives 5 PIR: Dubljević 19	Boxscore	Pts: Díaz 12; Rebs: Waczyński 6 Asts: Nedović 4 PIR: Díaz, Suárez 12	Arena: Fuente de San Luis; Attendance: 7,813; Referees: Sreten Radović (CRO), Borys Ryzhyk (UKR), Mario Majkić (SLO)

Starters:			Pts	Reb	Ast
PG	16	(Spain) Guillem Vives	0	4	5
SG	17	(Spain) Rafa Martínez	3	2	1
SF	19	(Spain) Fernando San Emeterio	7	3	0
PF	0	(United States) Will Thomas	6	1	0
C	18	(Spain) Pierre Oriola	4	3	0
Reserves:					
SG	8	(France) Antoine Diot	DNP		
PG	9	(Belgium) Sam van Rossom	6	4	4
SF	10	(Central African Republic) Romain Sato	5	5	0
C	14	(Montenegro) Bojan Dubljević	16	6	1
SF	30	(Spain) Joan Sastre	8	1	2
PG	42	(Spain) Luis Ferrando	DNP		
PF	43	(United States) Luke Sikma	3	7	2
Head coach:
(Spain) Pedro Martínez

Valencia Basket	Unicaja

2016–17 EuroCup champions

Unicaja
(1st title)

Starters:			Pts	Reb	Ast
PG	9	(Spain) Alberto Díaz	12	0	2
SG	16	(Serbia) Nemanja Nedović	6	2	4
SF	21	(Poland) Adam Waczyński	3	6	0
PF	23	(United States) Jeff Brooks	9	5	1
C	92	(Slovenia) Alen Omić	8	3	0
Reserves:					
C	2	(Democratic Republic of the Congo) Viny Okouo	0	0	0
PG	8	(United States) Kyle Fogg	2	1	1
SF	11	(Spain) Dani Díez	9	3	0
SG	15	(United States) Jamar Smith	10	1	3
PG	20	(Croatia) Oliver Lafayette	0	0	0
SF	43	(Spain) Carlos Suárez	4	5	0
C	44	(Serbia) Dejan Musli	DNP		
Head coach:
(Spain) Joan Plaza

== Finals MVP ==
Pos	Player	Team	Ref
G	(Spain) Alberto Díaz	(Spain) Unicaja	

== See also ==
- 2017 EuroLeague Final Four
- 2017 Basketball Champions League Final Four
- 2017 FIBA Europe Cup Finals
