= Joan Sastre =

Joan Sastre may refer to:

- Joan Sastre (basketball)
- Joan Sastre (footballer)
