= Yotam Halperin =

Israeli basketball player (born 1984)

Yotam Halperin יותם הלפרין
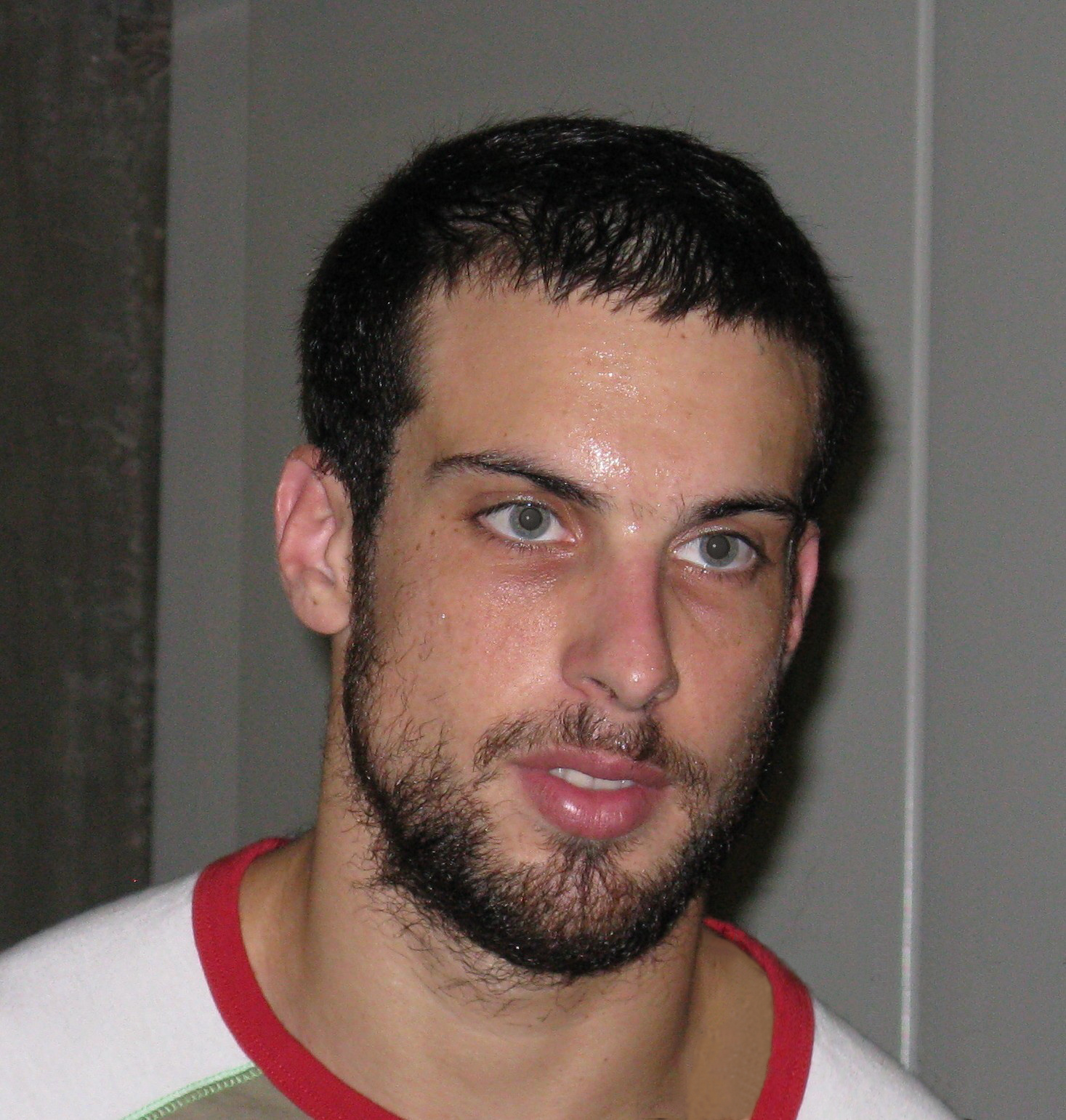

Hapoel Jerusalem
- Title: Sporting director
- League: Israeli Premier League; FIBA Champions League

Personal information
- Born: January 24, 1984 (age 42) Tel Aviv, Israel
- Listed height: 1.93 m (6 ft 4 in)
- Listed weight: 95 kg (209 lb)

Career information
- NBA draft: 2006: 2nd round, 53rd overall pick
- Drafted by: Seattle SuperSonics
- Playing career: 2001–2018
- Position: Shooting guard / point guard
- Number: 9, 10, 11, 13, 21
- Coaching career: 2018–present

Career history

Playing
- 2001–2005: Maccabi Tel Aviv
- 2005–2006: Union Olimpija
- 2006–2008: Maccabi Tel Aviv
- 2008–2011: Olympiacos
- 2011–2012: Spartak Saint Petersburg
- 2012–2013: Bayern Munich
- 2013–2018: Hapoel Jerusalem

Coaching
- 2018–present: Hapoel Jerusalem (Sporting director)
- 2021-2022: Hapoel Jerusalem (Interim HC)

Career highlights
- 2× EuroLeague champion (2004, 2005); All-EuroLeague Second Team (2008); 2× All-EuroCup Second Team (2012, 2014); 7× Israeli Super League champion (2002–2005, 2007, 2015, 2017); 4× Israeli State Cup winner (2002–2005); 3× Israeli League Cup winner (2007, 2014, 2016); Israeli League Cup MVP (2014); 2× Greek Cup winner (2010, 2011); Slovenian League champion (2006); Slovenian Cup winner (2006)
- Stats at Basketball Reference

Yotam Halperin (Hebrew: יותם הלפרין; born January 24, 1984) is an Israeli former professional basketball player. He is currently the sporting director for Hapoel Jerusalem of the Israeli Premier League and the Champions League. He is a 1.93 m (6 ft 4 in) tall combo guard. He was named to the 2007–08 All-EuroLeague Second Team.

== Early life ==
Halperin is Jewish, and was born in Tel Aviv, Israel. He played in the Maccabi Tel Aviv youth team and won two Israeli Youth League titles (2000–01, 2001–02). Simultaneously, He led his high school basketball team into winning the national title.

== Professional career ==
=== Maccabi Tel Aviv ===
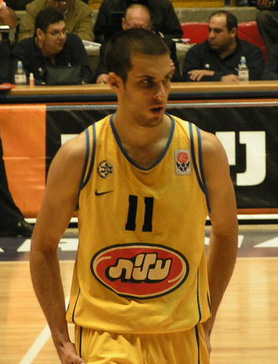
Halperin with Maccabi, 2004

Halperin debuted in Maccabi senior team at the age of 17 in a EuroLeague game against Alba Berlin. In his first years with Maccabi, Yotam barely recorded minutes, coming off the bench for stars such as Ariel McDonald and Šarūnas Jasikevičius. In his first three seasons he averaged 12.3 minutes per game in the Israeli BSL.

Halperin has won the 2003–04 Euroleague title with Maccabi. He scored 7 points and passed 4 assists in the final against Skipper Bologna. The team were able to win the 2004–05 Euroleague as well, but Halperin didn't have a major part in the success.

=== Union Olimpija ===
On August 31, 2005, Yotam signed a one-year contract with Slovenian League Champions Union Olimpija. Maccabi agreed to release Halperin, in order for him to gain experience at the EuroLeague level. Halperin immediately took a leading role in the team, averaging 13.9 points in 36 minutes per game during the 2005–06 Euroleague, but the team failed to reach the Top 16.

At the domestic level, he won the Slovenian National Cup and the Slovenian Championship, after winning 3–2 in the final series against Geoplin Slovan.

=== NBA draft ===
After his breakout season with Union Olimpija, Halperin declared himself as available for the 2006 NBA draft. The NBA Mock draft websites did not project him to be drafted at all. Despite the earlier predictions, Halperin was selected in the second round (53rd pick overall) by the Seattle SuperSonics.

=== Return To Maccabi Tel Aviv ===
After failing to gain a guaranteed contract in the NBA, Yotam signed a three-year deal with his former club Maccabi Tel Aviv. He fulfilled a bigger role in the team's rotation compared to his first term with the Maccabi, averaging more than 24 minutes per game and starting in 13 out of 19 games during the 2006–07 Euroleague Season.

In the 2007–08 Euroleague season Halperin helped Maccabi reach the EuroLeague final. His good performance had earned him a place in the All-EuroLeague 2nd Team.

=== Olympiacos Piraeus ===
On June 25, 2008, Yotam signed a deal with EuroLeague team Olympiacos Piraeus. The contract was worth 4.5 million USD spread over three years. The buy-out from Maccabi, in which he had a contract in, had cost Olympiacos 950,000USD. In Olympiacos Halperin joined his former teammate Nikola Vujcic, and former EuroLeague MVP Theodoros Papaloukas. The team has reached 2008–09 Euroleague final four losing to Arch enemies Panathinaikos in the semis. a year later they reached the 2009–10 Euroleague final but lost to FC Barcelona.

Before the 2010–11 season Olympiacos has placed Yotam in the inactive list, and ordered his agent to find him a new team. After his agent wasn't able to locate a team that agreed to carry Halperin's heavy contract, Olympiacos head coach Dušan Ivković agreed to give the player a second chance at the roster. eventually, he stayed in Olympiacos for the rest of the season.

=== Spartak Saint Petersburg ===
On June 20, 2011, Maccabi Tel Aviv announced the return of Halperin, who signed a contract for three years. Almost a month later, Maccabi has announced cancellation of the contract due to taxation problems.

After the fiasco with Maccabi, Halperin signed a 2-years contract with Russian team Spartak Saint Petersburg. Yotam had good season in the 2011–12 Eurocup, where his team reached the semi-finals. Yotam has awarded a place in the All-Eurocup 2nd Team, with his teammate Patrick Beverley gaining the MVP award.

Yotam was released from Spartak at the end of the season.

=== Bayern Munich ===
On July 17, 2012, Yotam signed a one-year contract with Bayern Munich of the Basketball Bundesliga (BBL). He finished a disappointing season with Bayern, averaging only 6.3 point per game.

=== Hapoel Jerusalem ===
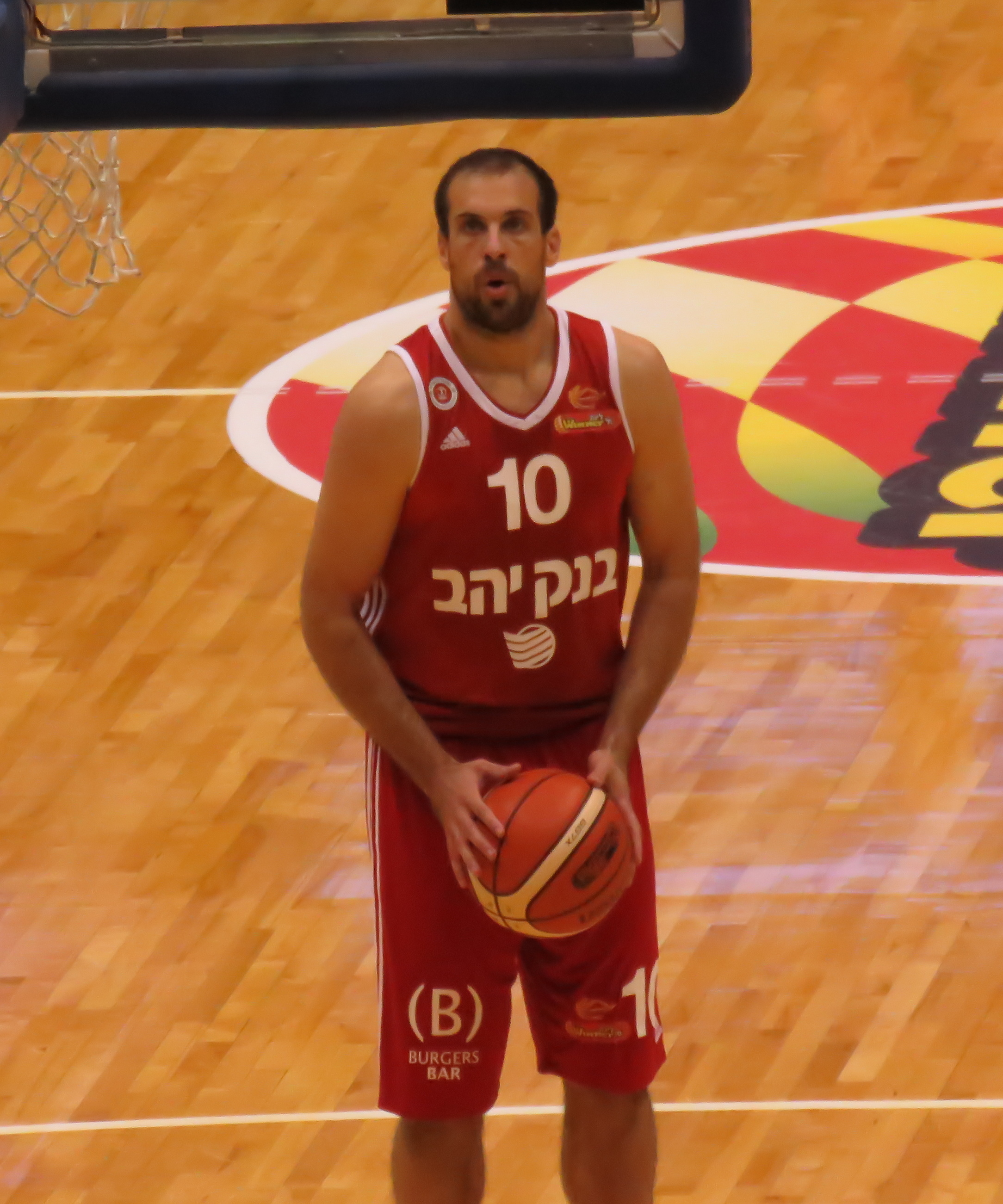
Halperin with Hapoel Jerusalem, 2015

Despite rumors of being close to Maccabi Tel Aviv, Yotam made a shock signing with their rIvals Hapoel Jerusalem for three years. From his first season he became the team captain. In 2013–14 Halperin averaged 11.7 points in EuroCup and reached with his team the quarterfinals of the competition. In 2014–15 season he led Hapoel Jerusalem to its first Israeli League championship.

In his fourth season with Jerusalem, he helped the team to win the 2016 Israeli League Cup and the 2017 Israeli League Championship, as well as reaching the 2017 EuroCup Semifinals, where they eventually were eliminated by Valencia.

On August 21, 2018, Halperin announced his retirement from playing professional basketball.

== Israeli national team ==
Halperin was a member of the Israel national U-21 team leading the team to the second place of the 2004 FIBA Europe Under-20 Championship. Yotam finished as the 2nd best scorer with an average of 20.4 points per game. He was also selected to the All-Tournament Team.

At the 2005 FIBA Under-21 World Championship Halperin finished as the top scorer, averaging 23.5 points per game as Israel finished at 10th place.

Halperin served as the captain of the Israeli national basketball team. He competed in 6 European Championships:2003, 2005, 2007, 2009, 2011, 2013.

== Coaching career ==
=== Hapoel Jerusalem ===
After retiring as a player, Halperin was hired as the Sporting Director for Hapoel Jerusalem in 2018. He served in this post until he was hired as the team's new interim head coach following the firing of Oren Amiel in 2021.

== Career statistics ==
Legend
GP	Games played	GS	Games started	MPG	Minutes per game
FG%	Field-goal percentage	3P%	3-point field-goal percentage	FT%	Free-throw percentage
RPG	Rebounds per game	APG	Assists per game	SPG	Steals per game
BPG	Blocks per game	PPG	Points per game	PIR	Performance index rating
**Bold**	Career high

=== EuroLeague ===
†	Denotes season in which Halperin won the EuroLeague
*	Led the league

Year	Team	GP	GS	MPG	FG%	3P%	FT%	RPG	APG	SPG	BPG	PPG	PIR
2001–02	Maccabi	3	1	2.0	.000	.000	—	—	—	—	—	0.0	-1.7
2002–03	Maccabi	8	0	4.0	**1.000**	**1.000**	.500	.3	.1	.1	—	1.0	0.6
2003–04†	Maccabi	17	0	6.2	.416	.273	.857	1.1	.8	.5	—	2.1	3.1
2004–05†	Maccabi	15	1	10.0	.424	.429	.636	1.1	.7	.5	.1	2.7	2.5
2005–06	Olimpija	14	11	**36.0**	.462	.373	.900	**3.1**	3.6	**2.2**	0.1	**13.9**	**15.4**
2006–07	Maccabi	19	13	24.4	.371	.348	.852	2.1	2.0	1.1	.1	6.5	5.8
2007–08	Maccabi	**25***	**23**	28.0	.536	.444	.873	2.1	**4.0**	1.0	.1	10.2	13.0
2008–09	Olympiacos	22	15	21.5	.539	.458	.795	1.6	1.5	1.0	.1	7.4	8.9
2009–10	Olympiacos	21	11	13.5	.609	.519	**.957**	0.9	1.0	0.6	.1	5.4	5.5
2010–11	Olympiacos	13	3	14.2	.547	.450	.750	1.9	1.3	.9	**.2**	4.5	5.7
Career		157	78	18.7	.492	.418	.851	1.6	1.8	.9	.1	6.3	7.2

== See also ==
- List of select Jewish basketball players
