= Jamar Smith =

American basketball player (born 1987)

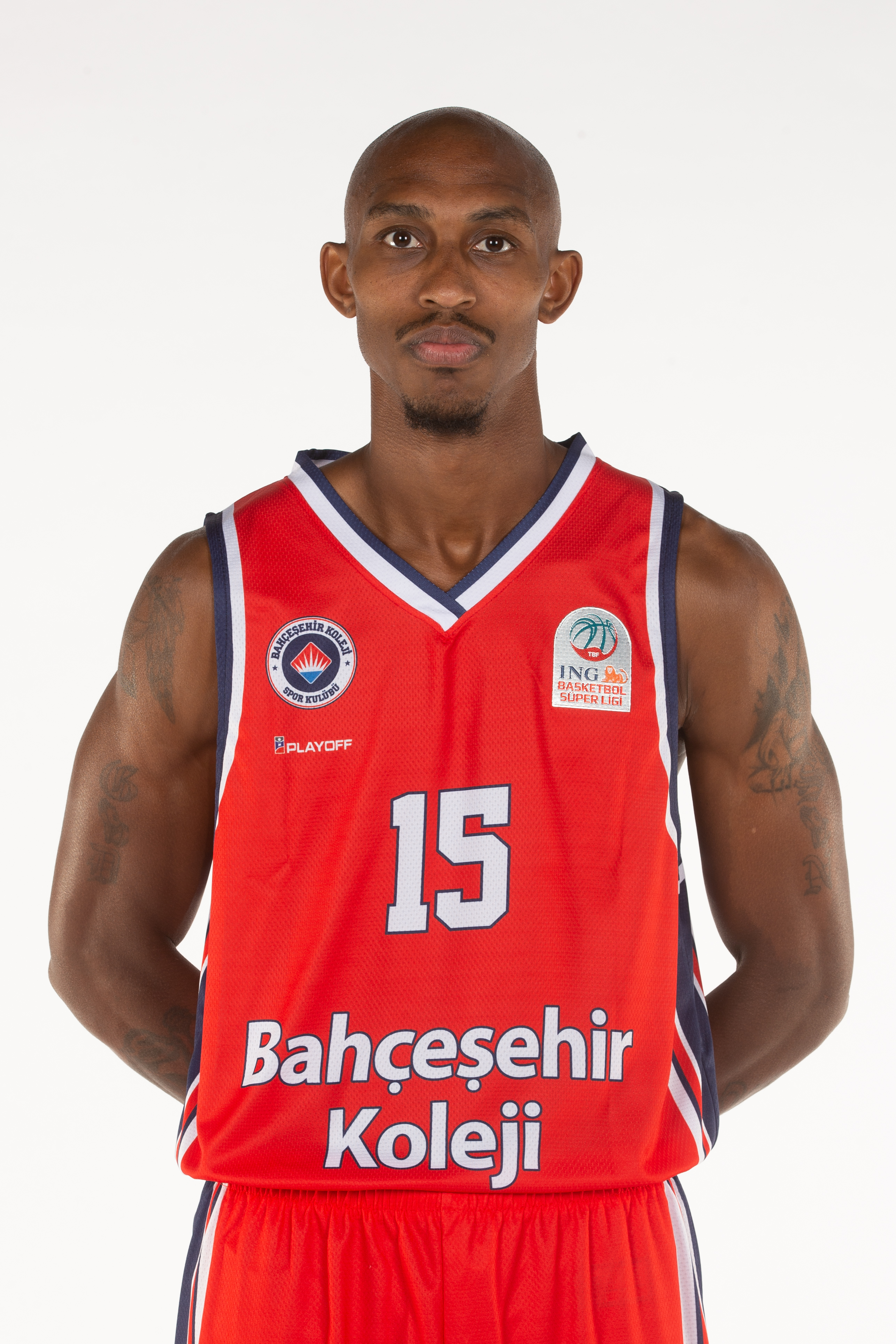
- Smith in 2021

Free Agent
- Position: Shooting guard

Personal information
- Born: April 7, 1987 (age 39) Peoria, Illinois, U.S.
- Listed height: 6 ft 3 in (1.91 m)
- Listed weight: 185 lb (84 kg)

Career information
- High school: Richwoods (Peoria, Illinois)
- College: Illinois (2005–2007); Southern Indiana (2008–2010)
- NBA draft: 2010: undrafted
- Playing career: 2010–present

Career history
- 2010–2011: Maine Red Claws
- 2011: Guaiqueríes de Margarita
- 2011–2012: Prostějov
- 2012–2013: Hapoel Gilboa Galil
- 2013–2014: Brose Baskets
- 2014–2015: Limoges CSP
- 2015–2017: Unicaja
- 2017–2021: UNICS Kazan
- 2021–2023: Bahçeşehir Koleji
- 2023–2026: Reggio Emilia

Career highlights
- EuroCup champion (2017); EuroCup MVP (2021); All-EuroCup First Team (2021); FIBA Europe Cup champion (2022); FIBA Europe Cup Final MVP (2022); VTB United League Sixth Man of the Year (2018); French League champion (2015); Pro A Sixth Man of the Year (2015); Balkan League champion (2013)

Jamar Desean Smith (born April 7, 1987) is an American professional basketball player who last played for Pallacanestro Reggiana of the Italian Lega Basket Serie A (LBA). Standing at 6 ft 3 in (1.91 m), he plays the shooting guard position. He played collegiate basketball at Illinois and then at Southern Indiana.

== Early life ==
On January 8, 2004, Smith, a three-star recruit out of Peoria (Illinois) Richwoods High School committed to the University of Illinois basketball program under then-Head Coach Bruce Weber.

== Collegiate career ==
=== Illinois ===
Smith began playing for Illinois in the 2005–2006 season. Illinois had just played in the NCAA National Championship game the previous March, and then lost junior guard Deron Williams to the NBA, so the natural shooter Smith seemed to be in a perfect position to step into a vacuum and become a team leader. Even though he was a bench player as a freshman, Smith still managed to be the fifth-highest Illinois scorer that year, appearing in 32 of 33 games; he led the Big Ten Conference in three-point shooting percentage (48.2%), and was a Big Ten All-Freshmen team selection.

The 2006-2007 sophomore season for Smith began with trouble, as he suffered a high ankle sprain in the season opener against Austin Peay when an opposing player stepped on his ankle. Smith missed the next six games, and also injured the other ankle compensating for the sprained ankle; Smith was never at full strength that season. On February 10, 2007, the Fighting Illini lost to basketball arch-rival Indiana University by a score of 61–65 in a game played at Bloomington, Indiana. It would be the last game Jamar Smith ever played in an Illinois jersey. (See DUI Arrest)

=== Southern Indiana ===
On December 30, 2008, after a nearly two-year absence from college basketball, Smith stepped onto the court as a member of the University of Southern Indiana Screaming Eagles. Rusty skills, nerves and embarrassment over having to play while wearing an ankle monitor led to a slow start in his first game for USI, but Smith was soon back to his old form, leading his team to a #2 national ranking in Division II, and was given Honorable Mention Division II All-American, and finished the season averaging 18.5 points per game. As a senior in 2010 Smith was named the Basketball Times Division II Player of the Year, with a career-high 21.6 points per game average.

=== Collegiate statistics ===
Smith played first two seasons in Division I, and the last two in Division II.

Year	Team	GP	GS	MPG	FG%	3P%	FT%	RPG	APG	SPG	BPG	PPG
2005–06	Illinois	32	0	19.2	.470	.482	.704	1.7	1.3	.5	.0	8.0
2006–07	Illinois	21	6	22.5	.333	.317	.788	1.6	1.9	.9	.1	8.1
2008–09	Southern Indiana	21	15	33.1	.472	.476	.764	2.5	2.5	1.7	.2	18.5
2009–10	Southern Indiana	26	26	32.3	.465	.427	.792	4.1	3.7	1.2	.4	21.6
Career		100	47	26.2	.447	.431	.765	2.5	2.3	.8	.2	13.8

== Professional career ==
Following his college career, Jamar Smith played in the 2010 NBA Summer League for the Minnesota Timberwolves. He went unselected in the NBA draft. On September 27, 2010, Smith was signed to a one-year unguaranteed minimum salary contract with the Boston Celtics, but was waived four days later. On October 30, the Celtics assigned him to their NBA Development League affiliate, the Maine Red Claws, where he was named to the D-League's All Rookie Second Team. Despite playing virtually all season with a foot injury, he averaged 13.5 points per game, including a double-double (20 points and 10 rebounds) and finished 4th in the league in 3-point shots made.

in April 2011 he was signed to play in Venezuela for Guaiqueries de Margerita, but was released about a week later. In August 2011 he was given a one-year contract by BK Prostejov in the Czech Republic, where he averaged 14.9 points per game.

Smith signed with the Boston Celtics on July 31, 2012 and played for the Celtics in the 2012 NBA Summer League. He appeared in four preseason games, averaging 2.3 points and 1.0 rebound per game. He was waived on October 16, 2012. On October 26, 2012, he signed a one-year deal with Hapoel Gilboa Galil of Israel.

In June 2013, Smith signed a two-year deal with Brose Baskets of Germany. He left them after one season.

On August 4, 2014, he signed a two-year deal with the French team Limoges CSP. With Limoges he won the 2014–15 LNB Pro A championship. On June 25, 2015, he parted ways with Limoges.

On June 26, 2015, Smith signed a two-year contract with the Spanish club Unicaja. In April 2017, Smith won the EuroCup with Unicaja after beating Valencia Basket in the Finals.

On July 17, 2017, Smith signed with Russian club UNICS for the 2017–18 season. On June 9, 2018, Smith won the VTB United League Sixth Man of the Year award. He averaged 15.4 points and 3.6 assists per game in the 2019–20 season. On July 8, 2020, Smith re-signed with the team.

On July 6, 2021, he has signed with Bahçeşehir Koleji of the Turkish Basketbol Süper Ligi (BSL). He guided the team to their first FIBA Europe Cup championship, while winning the FIBA Europe Cup Final MVP award.

On July 11, 2023, he signed two-year deal with Pallacanestro Reggiana of the Italian Lega Basket Serie A (LBA).

== Career statistics ==
Legend
GP	Games played	MPG	Minutes per game	FG%	Field goal percentage
3P%	3-point field goal percentage	FT%	Free throw percentage	RPG	Rebounds per game
APG	Assists per game	SPG	Steals per game	BPG	Blocks per game
PPG	Points per game	**Bold**	Career high		Led the league

Year	Team	League	GP	MPG	FG%	3P%	FT%	RPG	APG	SPG	BPG	PPG
2010–11	Maine Red Claws	NBA G-League	**48**	**33.8**	.461	.432	.872	2.3	**4.3**	1.0	.2	11.9
2013–14	Brose Bamberg	EuroLeague	10	21.2	.445	.481	.833	1.5	1.8	.5	.0	12.5
2014–15	Limoges CSP	EuroLeague	10	26.1	.515	.458	.818	**2.6**	3.1	**1.2**	.1	14.0
2015–16	Unicaja	EuroLeague	15	21.1	.328	.393	.875	1.3	2.4	.8	.0	7.8
2016–17	Unicaja	EuroCup	21	20.8	.436	.430	.783	1.7	2.2	.5	.1	10.3
2017–18	BC UNICS Kazan	VTB United League	29	29.2	.512	.481	.950	2.1	2.4	**1.2**	.2	14.4
2017–18	BC UNICS Kazan	EuroCup	19	31.2	.454	.394	**1.00**	1.8	2.9	**1.2**	.1	13.1
2018–19	BC UNICS Kazan	VTB United League	31	25.4	.515	.451	.972	**2.6**	3.2	1.0	.1	13.2
2019–20	BC UNICS Kazan	EuroCup	15	27.8	**.524**	**.528**	.778	2.0	3.7	1.1	**.3**	**15.2**
Career		All Leagues	198	27.7	.475	.449	.893	2.1	3.1	.9	.1	12.5

== Disciplinary and legal issues ==
=== DUI Arrest ===
On the night of February 12, 2007, Central Illinois experienced one of the biggest blizzards it had received in the previous ten years, dumping 15" of snow in the Champaign area, and making travel dangerous. At approximately 9 PM that night, Smith and Illini teammate Brian Carlwell, both age 19 at the time, began drinking at one of the apartments in the complex where they lived in the small town of Savoy, Illinois, about 10 minutes south of the Assembly Hall (now called State Farm Center), the University of Illinois basketball arena. Smith says he was engaged in a drinking game they called "Power Hour"—drinking a shot of tequila every 60 seconds, a dozen shots in total. According to witnesses, Smith and Carlwell left the apartment at approximately 11 PM after "things got really rowdy and out of control" and got into a 1996 Lexus belonging to Smith's grandfather; the two intoxicated players drove off into the blizzard toward the university campus on the snow-packed roads.

Shortly thereafter, Smith returned to the apartment, visibly shaken, and incoherent. About one mile from the apartment, Smith had lost control of the car in the snow, spun 180 degrees, and the passenger door of the car smashed into a tree on the opposite side of the road. He had driven the car back to the apartment complex and Brian Carlwell was still outside in the passenger side of the car—Smith said that Carlwell was dead. Witnesses said the Smith was so distraught over the thought of killing his friend that he broke a window and tried to harm himself and was restrained.

Witnesses outside the apartment saw the damaged car with a person inside who was not moving, and called 911. When authorities arrived, it turned out that Carlwell was not dead, but unconscious—he had suffered a severe concussion and was admitted to a local hospital where he was kept in an induced coma for four days after the accident. Amateur photos of the wrecked car Smith was driving were posted contemporaneously by the administrator of a major Illinois basketball discussion forum.

Carlwell, a 6'10" freshman reserve center for the Illini, rejoined the team a week later, but did not play in any of the final eight games of the season. He only played in three games for Illinois the following season, and in February 2008, one year after the accident, Carlwell announced that he was transferring to San Diego State University, where he played his final two college seasons.

Jamar Smith was charged by the Champaign County Sheriff with Aggravated DUI (because of Carlwell's severe injuries) and Leaving the Scene of an Accident Involving Personal Injury; both charges are felonies in Illinois. Smith's blood alcohol content that night was .176, more than twice the .08 legal limit. Three months after the accident Smith entered a plea of guilty to DUI with grievous bodily harm, and the leaving the scene charge was dropped as part of a plea agreement. Partly because Smith had no prior criminal record of any kind, he received a relatively light sentence—15 days in jail, an $850 fine, two years probation, and 75 hours community service. He was also ordered not to consume alcohol as a condition of his probation. After the guilty plea, the Illinois basketball program suspended Smith for one year, and permitted him to redshirt during that time, so as not to lose a year of NCAA eligibility during his suspension.

=== Probation Violation ===
Smith completed the university suspension in May 2008, and the NCAA basketball pundits were speculating about the effect that the return of Smith to the team would have for Illinois, since the team had struggled to find a consistent shooter. However Jamar Smith was still under the two year probation restrictions imposed by the court, when on July 25 of that year, police were called to the scene of a 2:30 AM altercation outside a campus-area bar. Smith was not involved in any way in the altercation, but police said they ordered Smith, and others who were at the scene, to stay back away from the altercation to avoid inflaming the incident. Police said that Smith walked away three times, but each time returned to the scene. Police then approached Smith, said he smelled like alcohol and asked him about it, and Smith admitted he had a few beers. As a well-known local athlete, the police knew who Smith was, and they also knew that his DUI sentence prohibited him from consuming alcohol. He was not arrested at that time but a few days later, the Champaign County States Attorney, Julia Reitz, asked a judge to revoke Smith's probation.

As a result of the probation violation, Smith was given a six-month suspended jail sentence, his probation period was extended an additional 18 months, he was ordered to enter an alcohol rehabilitation program, and to wear an alcohol monitoring anklet 24 hours a day until his probation was completed.

The University of Illinois announced that Smith was permanently dismissed from the basketball program. Smith arranged with court officials to move to Evansville, Indiana where he completed the ordered rehab, worked in a grocery store, and entered the University of Southern Indiana.

=== Aftermath ===
Jamar Smith is forthcoming about his alcoholism, the serious errors in judgment he made, and how he was given a second, and a third, chance to get his life together. From some reports, Smith, with the help of friends and family, has turned his life around. He has said that at some point he would like to travel and speak to young people about his experiences. Smith is still in contact with many people from his time at Illinois, including former head coach Bruce Weber, his best friend from the Illinois team, Chester Frazier, and Brian Carlwell, the player who was riding with 19-year-old Smith in the car on the night that changed the direction of his life.
