= Alen Omić =

Bosnian-born Slovenian basketball player (born 1992)

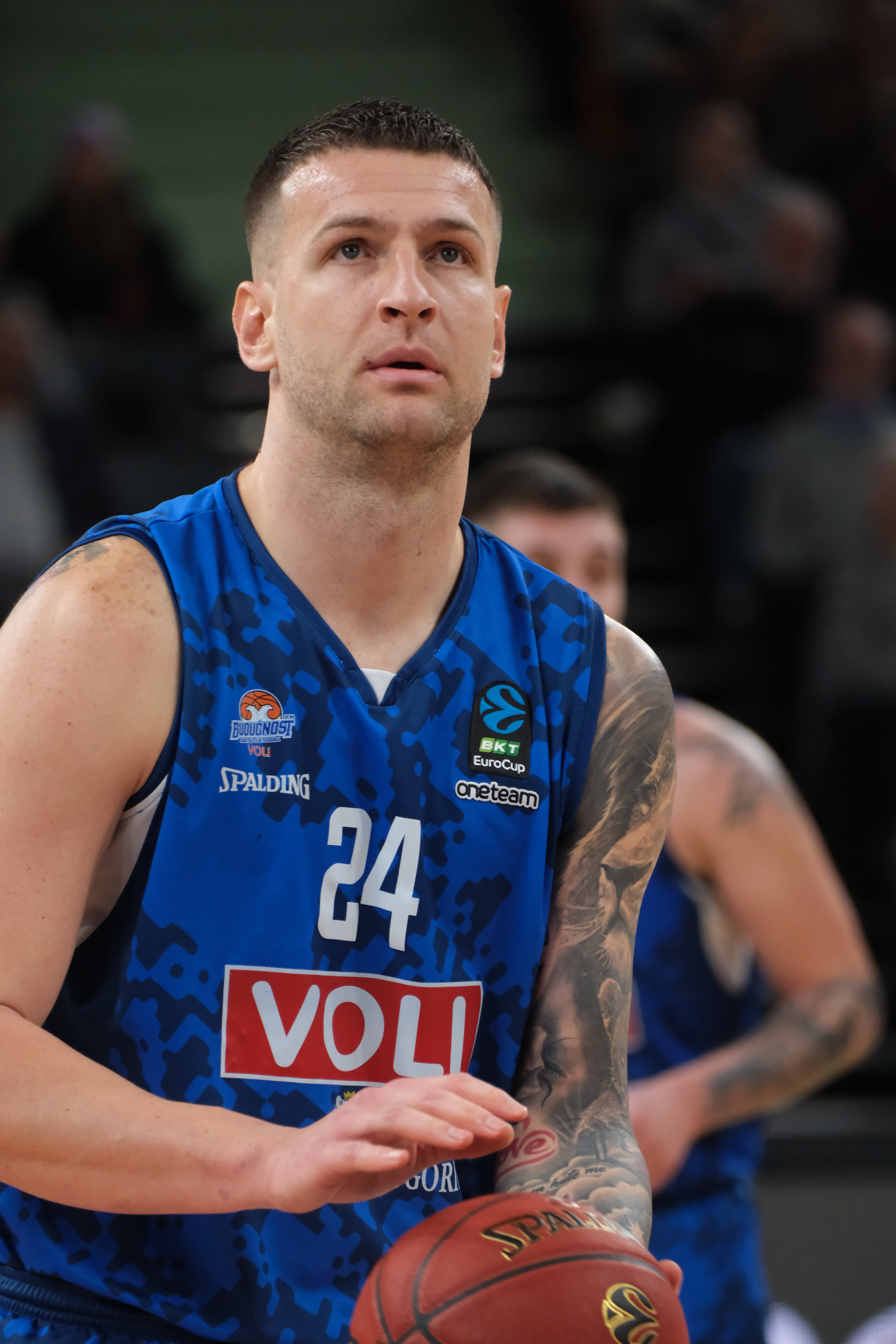

No. 24 – Spartak Subotica
- Position: Center
- League: KLS; ABA League; BCL

Personal information
- Born: 6 May 1992 (age 34) Tuzla, Bosnia and Herzegovina
- Listed height: 2.16 m (7 ft 1 in)
- Listed weight: 111 kg (245 lb)

Career information
- NBA draft: 2012: undrafted
- Playing career: 2009–present

Career history
- 2009–2012: Zlatorog
- 2012–2015: Olimpija
- 2015–2016: Gran Canaria
- 2016–2017: Anadolu Efes
- 2017: Unicaja Málaga
- 2017–2018: Hapoel Jerusalem
- 2018: Crvena zvezda
- 2018: Budućnost
- 2019: Olimpia Milano
- 2019–2020: Joventut Badalona
- 2020–2021: JL Bourg
- 2021–2023: Cedevita Olimpija
- 2023: Guangxi Rhinos
- 2023–2024: Metropolitans 92
- 2024: Cedevita Olimpija
- 2024–2025: Budućnost
- 2025–2026: Merkezefendi Denizli Basket
- 2026–present: Spartak Subotica

Career highlights
- EuroCup champion (2017); All-EuroCup First Team (2016); Serbian League champion (2018); Serbian League Playoffs MVP (2018); 3× Slovenian League champion (2022–2024); 2× Slovenian League Finals MVP (2022, 2024); Slovenian League All-Star (2012); 4× Slovenian Cup winner (2013, 2022–2024); 2× Slovenian Cup MVP (2023, 2024); 3× Slovenian Supercup winner (2013, 2014, 2022); Montenegrin League champion (2025); Montenegrin Cup winner (2025)

Alen Omić (born 6 May 1992) is a Slovenian professional basketball player for Spartak Subotica of the Serbian League (KLS), the ABA League and the Basketball Champions League (BCL).

== Professional career ==
Omić started playing professional basketball for Zlatorog Laško. In 2009, he signed with Zlatorog and stayed with the club for three seasons until 2012.

On 30 August 2012, Omić signed a four-year deal with Union Olimpija.

In July 2014, Omić joined the Brooklyn Nets for the 2014 NBA Summer League. He returned to the Summer League the following year, for the Denver Nuggets.

On 1 August 2015, Omić signed a two-year deal with Gran Canaria. He made a good impression with Gran Canaria right from the start, and was named to the season's All-EuroCup First Team.

On 28 June 2016, Omić signed a two-year deal with Turkish club Anadolu Efes. On 16 January 2017, he left Efes, and signed with Spanish club Unicaja, for the rest of the season. In April 2017, he won the EuroCup with Unicaja after beating Valencia Basket in the Finals.

On 28 July 2017, Omić signed with Israeli club Hapoel Jerusalem for the 2017–18 season. On 20 January 2018, he left Hapoel and signed with Serbian club Crvena zvezda for the rest of the season.

On 2 January 2019, he signed with Olimpia Milano for the rest of the season.

On 24 June 2019, he signed with Joventut Badalona of the Liga ACB. Omić averaged 11.1 points and 6.5 rebounds per game. On 11 September 2020, he signed with JL Bourg Basket of the LNB Pro A. Omić averaged 11.4 points, 9.0 rebounds and 1.9 assists per game. On 23 November 2021, he signed with Cedevita Olimpija of the ABA League.

On 6 May 2023, he broke the ABA League all-time Offensive Rebounds record with 434 in a Quarterfinals game against KK FMP.

On 3 August 2023, he signed with Guangxi Rhinos of the National Basketball League. He averaged 19.43 points, 14.14 rebounds, 3.57 assists in 33.54 minutes in 7 games.

On 6 November 2023, he signed with Metropolitans 92 of the French LNB Pro A.

On 8 February 2024, he was back in Cedevita Olimpija of fhe Slovenian Basketball League and the Adriatic League.

On 6 October 2024, he signed with Budućnost.

On 16 October 2025, Omić signed with Merkezefendi Belediyesi Denizli of the Basketbol Süper Ligi (BSL).

On 22 September 2026, Omić signed with Spartak Subotica of the Serbian League, the ABA League and the Basketball Champions League.

== International career ==
Omić made his debut for the senior Slovenian national team at the 2014 FIBA World Cup. He also represented Slovenia at the EuroBasket 2015, where they were eliminated by Latvia in the tournament's eighth finals.

== Career statistics ==
Legend
GP	Games played	GS	Games started	MPG	Minutes per game
FG%	Field-goal percentage	3P%	3-point field-goal percentage	FT%	Free-throw percentage
RPG	Rebounds per game	APG	Assists per game	SPG	Steals per game
BPG	Blocks per game	PPG	Points per game	PIR	Performance index rating
**Bold**	Career high

=== EuroLeague ===
Year	Team	GP	GS	MPG	FG%	3P%	FT%	RPG	APG	SPG	BPG	PPG	PIR
2012–13	Union Olimpija	10	0	12.8	.417	.000	**.625**	3.8	.1	.1	**.3**	5.0	5.8
2016–17	Anadolu Efes	**17**	1	8.2	.550	—	.375	1.5	.4	.2	—	2.9	2.4
2017–18	Crvena zvezda	11	0	17.4	**.704**	—	.516	3.9	.8	.2	.2	8.4	**10.7**
2018–19	Budućnost	15	**15**	**21.0**	.611	**.333**	.615	**4.7**	**1.1**	.3	**.3**	**8.9**	10.6
2018–19	Olimpia Milano	14	2	12.5	.447	.000	.167	3.6	.5	**.4**	.2	2.5	4.1
Career		67	18	14.2	.570	.167	.532	3.4	.6	.2	.2	5.4	6.5

=== EuroCup ===
†	Denotes season in which Omić won the EuroCup

Year	Team	GP	GS	MPG	FG%	3P%	FT%	RPG	APG	SPG	BPG	PPG	PIR
2013–14	Union Olimpija	16	12	22.5	.596	—	.617	5.3	.4	.3	**1.1**	9.3	12.4
2014–15	Union Olimpija	15	11	24.5	.538	.000	**.661**	7.0	1.2	**.7**	.7	12.0	16.2
2015–16	Gran Canaria	**21**	13	24.5	633	—	.640	7.6	1.4	.4	.2	**14.0**	**19.2**
2016–17†	Unicaja	11	5	20.2	.542	—	.462	5.5	.6	.3	.3	6.4	9.7
2017–18	Hapoel Jerusalem	10	6	17.0	.517	—	.450	4.4	.3	.4	—	8.0	7.3
2019–20	Joventut Badalona	15	13	23.0	.597	—	.462	6.5	1.9	.7	.3	11.1	15.4
2020–21	JL Bourg	11	11	24.8	.592	.000	.545	7.0	1.5	.5	.5	8.2	14.5
2021–22	Cedevita Olimpija	15	15	22.5	**.725**	**.667**	.535	7.3	**2.0**	.5	.3	8.8	15.7
2022–23	Cedevita Olimpija	17	**17**	**25.5**	.548	.000	.714	**8.9**	1.3	.7	.2	10.8	17.3
2024–25	Budućnost	17	0	14.3	.484	.000	.528	4.4	.8	.2	.2	4.6	7.5
Career		148	103	22.1	.355	.118	.586	6.5	1.2	.5	.4	9.6	14.0
