= Dejan Musli =

Serbian basketball player

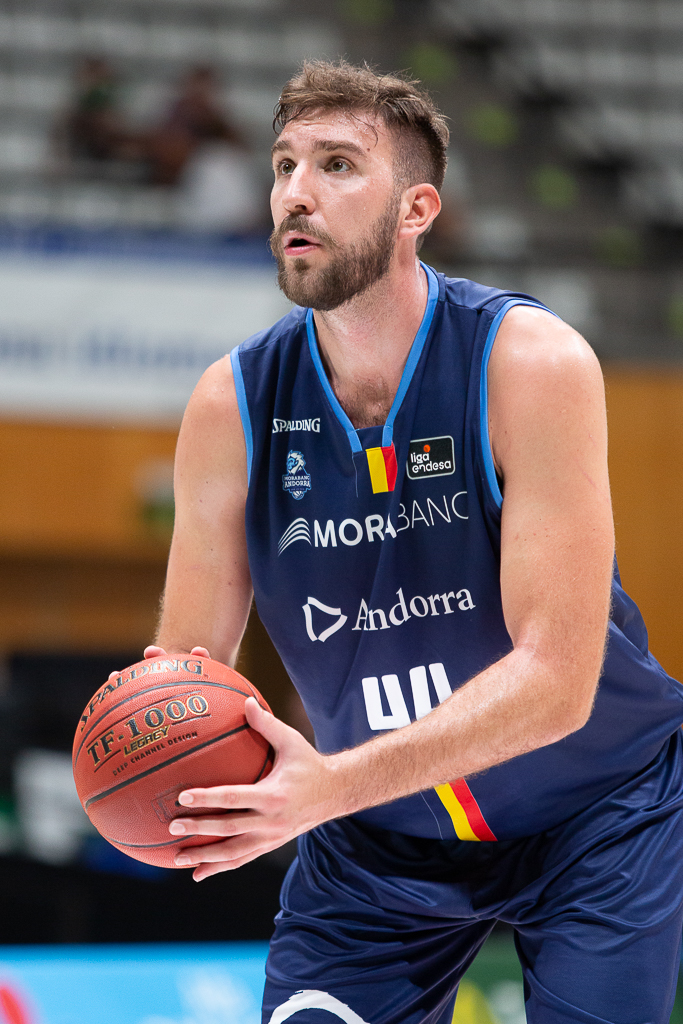

Personal information
- Born: 3 January 1991 (age 35) Prizren, SR Serbia, SFR Yugoslavia
- Listed height: 7 ft 0 in (2.13 m)
- Listed weight: 265 lb (120 kg)

Career information
- NBA draft: 2013: undrafted
- Playing career: 2008–2020
- Position: Center

Career history
- 2008–2010: FMP
- 2010–2012: Caja Laboral
- 2011: →Fuenlabrada
- 2012: →Mega Vizura
- 2012–2014: Partizan
- 2015: Mega Leks
- 2015–2016: Manresa
- 2016–2017: Unicaja
- 2017–2018: Brose Bamberg
- 2019: Hebei Xianglan
- 2019–2020: Andorra

Career highlights
- EuroCup champion (2017); All-EuroCup First Team (2017); ABA League champion (2013); 2× Serbian League champion (2013, 2014); All-Spanish League Second Team (2016); FIBA U16 European Championship MVP (2007); 2× EB Next Generation Tournament MVP (2008, 2009)
Medals
Men's basketball
Representing Serbia
U18 European Championship
Gold medal – first place	2009 France	U18 National Team
U16 European Championship
Gold medal – first place	2007 Greece	U16 National Team
Representing Serbia and Montenegro
U16 European Championship
Bronze medal – third place	2006 Spain	U16 National Team

Dejan Musli (Serbian Cyrillic: Дејан Мусли; born 3 January 1991) is a Serbian former professional basketball player. Standing at 7 ft 0 in (2.13 m), he played at the center position.

== Professional career ==
=== FMP (2008–10) ===
In the youth Musli won the Euroleague Basketball Nike International Junior Tournament twice with FMP dominating in the paint and winning MVP awards, which made him one of the most promising young players of his generation. In January 2009, Musli signed his first professional four-year contract with FMP, team where he spent previous 2 seasons at the junior level. In the summer of 2009, he won with his team the 2009 EuroLeague's NIJT junior tournament, after defeating the Lithuanian Lietuvos rytas. He scored 31 points and grabbed 17 rebounds in the final game, while also guarding Jonas Valančiūnas who scored 22 points. Despite being one of the most promising European players, in March 2010 Musli decided not to enter the 2010 NBA draft.

=== Caja Laboral (2010–12) ===
On 22 September 2010 Musli signed a five-year contract with the Spanish team Caja Laboral. In first season with the team, he saw very little playing time, also having played only two games in his first EuroLeague season.

In February 2011, Musli was loaned to the Italian team Montegranaro until the end of season, but was quickly sent back due to concerns about his poor work ethic and questionable attitude. Officially, he didn't play any game for Montegranaro due to illness. In October 2011 he was loaned on one-month assignment to the Spanish side Fuenlabrada, in order to return his game shape.

In February 2012, he was once again loaned, this time to Mega Vizura until the end of the season. Over the course of season, he averaged 9.1 points and 6.4 rebounds in the Basketball League of Serbia. He played just ten games over two years in all competitions with Caja Laboral.

=== Partizan (2012–14) ===
On 18 July 2012, shortly after terminating his contract with Caja Laboral, Musli signed a three-year contract with Partizan Belgrade, with option to leave after two seasons. In the first EuroLeague season with Partizan, he averaged 9.5 points and 4.9 rebounds over 10 games. After solid first season in Partizan, Musli's minutes per game dropped slightly in his second season with the team, which also reflected on his stats. He averaged 5.3 points and 3.1 rebounds over 23 EuroLeague games. In April 2014, at the Basketball League of Serbia game against Crnokosa, he scored season-high 22 points and added 5 rebounds while spending only 13 minutes on the court. In 2014, he won his second straight and club's 13th consecutive Serbian League defeating Red Star Belgrade with 3-1 in the final series.

=== Mega Leks ===
On 30 December 2014 Musli signed with Mega Leks for the rest of the season. In a debut for the new team against Cibona, he scored 26 points and grabbed 5 rebounds. Over 10 games in the Adriatic League, he averaged 15 points and 9.2 rebounds per game.

=== Bàsquet Manresa (2015–16) ===
On 17 August 2015, Musli signed a one-year contract with the Spanish club Bàsquet Manresa. On 25 October 2015, Musli was named ACB Player of the Month of October after averaging 14.7 points and 9.0 rebounds in the first three games of the season.

He finished the season as the top rated player with 19.7 Performance Index Rating points per game and was part of the All-ACB Second Team.

=== Unicaja (2016–17) ===
On 9 June 2016, Musli signed a two-year contract with the Spanish club Unicaja. In April 2017, Musli won the EuroCup with Unicaja after beating Valencia BC in the Finals. On 7 December 2017 he parted ways with Unicaja.

=== Brose Bamberg (2017–18) ===
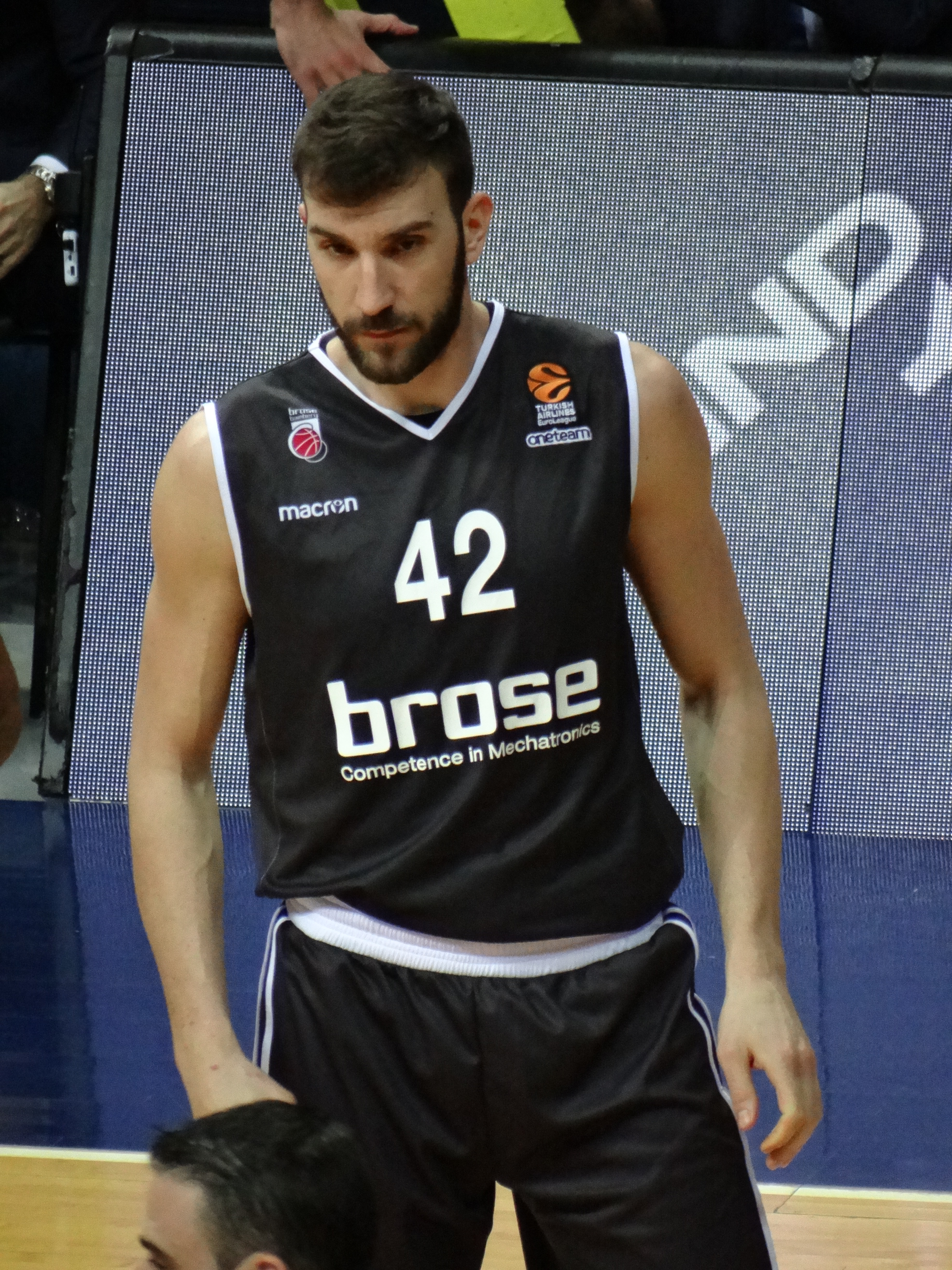
Musli, playing for Bamberg in 2018.

On 8 December 2017 Musli signed with German club Brose Bamberg for the rest of the 2017–18 season.

=== Andorra (2019–20) ===
In July 2019, after missing almost the entire 2018–19 season with the Chinese team Hebei Xianglan due to an injury, Musli signed a contract with the Spanish team Andorra. Over 17 ACB League games, Musli averaged 9.5 points and 5.7 rebounds on 52.8% shooting from the field.

== International career ==
Musli played for Serbian national team at the 2007 FIBA Europe Under-16 Championship in Greece and won a gold medal. He was named the tournament MVP averaging 16.3 points, 11.8 rebounds and 5.1 blocks per game.

== Career statistics ==
Legend
GP	Games played	GS	Games started	MPG	Minutes per game
FG%	Field-goal percentage	3P%	3-point field-goal percentage	FT%	Free-throw percentage
RPG	Rebounds per game	APG	Assists per game	SPG	Steals per game
BPG	Blocks per game	PPG	Points per game	PIR	Performance index rating
**Bold**	Career high

=== EuroLeague ===
Year	Team	GP	GS	MPG	FG%	3P%	FT%	RPG	APG	SPG	BPG	PPG	PIR
2010–11	Baskonia	2	0	2.0	.000	.000	.500	1.0	.0	.0	.0	.5	-2.0
2012–13	Partizan	10	**8**	**21.6**	.527	.000	**.773**	4.9	1.0	**.8**	**.4**	9.5	9.8
2013–14	Partizan	**23**	7	14.6	.495	.000	.538	3.1	.3	.3	.1	5.3	5.4
2017–18	Unicaja	9	1	11.2	.576	.000	.550	2.7	.4	.0	.3	5.4	6.9
2017–18	Bamberg	15	**8**	19.8	**.594**	.000	.678	**6.1**	**1.4**	.3	.3	**10.4**	**14.4**
Career		68	25	15.5	.542	.000	.632	4.1	.7	.3	.2	7.2	8.2
