= Alberto Díaz =

Spanish basketball player (born 1994)

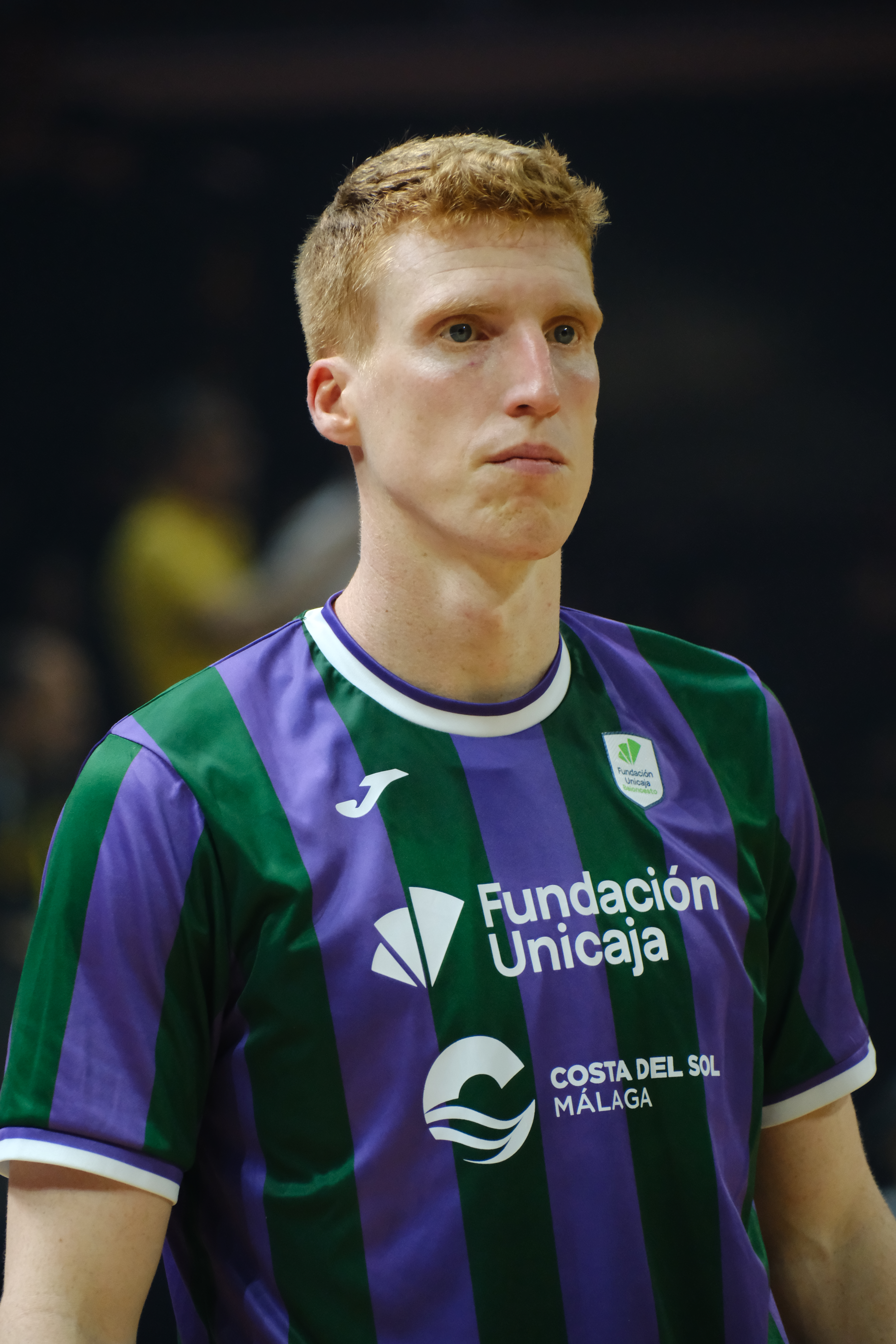
- Díaz with Unicaja Málaga in 2025

No. 9 – Unicaja Málaga
- Position: Point guard
- League: Liga ACB

Personal information
- Born: 23 April 1994 (age 32) Málaga, Spain
- Listed height: 1.91 m (6 ft 3 in)
- Listed weight: 86 kg (190 lb)

Career information
- NBA draft: 2016: undrafted
- Playing career: 2011–present

Career history
- 2011–2014: Clínicas Rincón
- 2012–present: Unicaja Málaga
- 2014: →Bilbao
- 2014–2015: →Fuenlabrada

Career highlights
- 2× FIBA Intercontinental Cup champion (2024, 2025); 2× FIBA Champions League champion (2024, 2025); 2× FIBA Champions League Defensive Player of the Year (2023, 2025); EuroCup champion (2017); EuroCup Finals MVP (2017); 2× Spanish Cup winner (2023, 2025); Spanish Supercup winner (2024)
Medals
Men's basketball
Representing Spain
EuroBasket
Gold medal – first place	2022 Czech Republic–Georgia–Italy–Germany
FIBA Europe Under-20 Championship
Silver medal – second place	2014 Greece	Under-20 team

Alberto Díaz Ortiz (born 23 April 1994) is a Spanish professional basketball player for Unicaja Málaga of the Liga ACB. At a height of 1.91 m (6 ft 3 in) in shoes, and a weight of 86 kg (190 lb), he plays at the point guard position.

== Professional career ==
Díaz started his professional career at Clínicas Rincón, an affiliated team of Unicaja. He played simultaneously with both teams until March 2014, when he was loaned to Bilbao Basket, until the end of the 2013–14 season.

Díaz was loaned again for the next season, this time to Baloncesto Fuenlabrada, a team that finished in the last position of the 2014–15 ACB season.

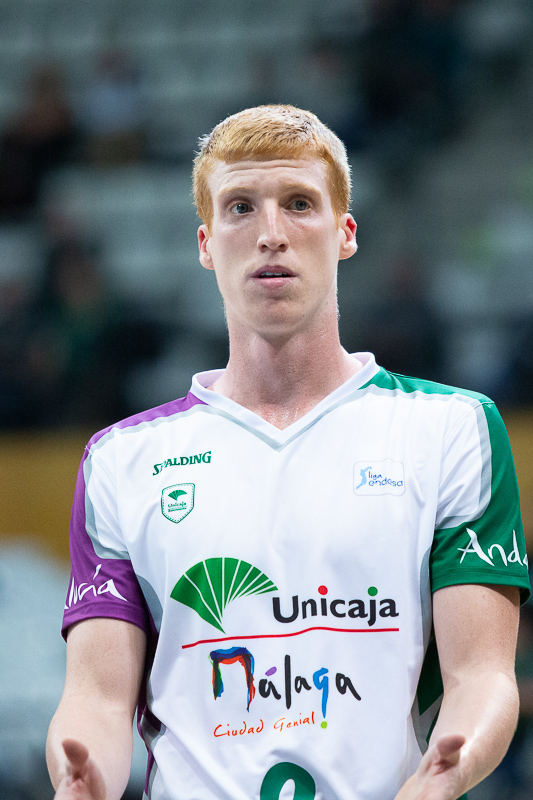
Díaz with Unicaja Málaga in 2025

Finally, in the summer of 2015, he came back to Unicaja, and definitively took a role in the team in the 2015–16 season. In the 2016–17 season, Díaz won the European-wide 2nd-tier level EuroCup, with Unicaja, after beating Valencia Basket in the Finals. Along with winning the EuroCup trophy, Díaz was also named the EuroCup Finals MVP, after he averaged 7.3 points, 3.0 assists, and 1.3 steals, in 21.8 minutes per game, over the three-game series.

Diaz signed a four-year contract extension on 7 August 2020.

In 2023–24, Díaz won the Basketball Champions League title with Unicaja. He won his second BCL Best Defender award in the 2024–25 season.

== International career ==
Díaz took part of the Spain national under-18 basketball team that won the Albert Schweitzer Tournament in 2012.

In July 2014, he won the silver medal at the Under-20 championship played in Greece.

After being cut from the final roster of the Spanish NT for EuroBasket 2022, he rejoined the team at the eleventh hour in the wake of Sergio Llull's injury, eventually being an integral part of the Spanish gold medal run, particularly in terms of providing defensive balance to the team, with averages of 5.7 points, 1.1 rebounds and 1.4 assists. He was praised for his defence on Dennis Schröder in the 4th quarter of the semifinals.

== Player profile ==
According to Fotis Katsikaris, Díaz "has an incredible mentality as an athlete. He always plays at 110% and does not know how to practice at a slower pace. I think he's one of the best, if not the best, perimeter defenders in Europe".

== Achievements ==
With Unicaja

- EuroCup: (1)
  - 2016–17

With Spain

- Albert Schweitzer Tournament: (1)
  - 2012

=== Individual awards ===
- EuroCup Finals MVP: 2016–17
- Basketball Champions League Best Defender: 2022–23, 2024–25
