= Fernando San Emeterio =

Spanish basketball player

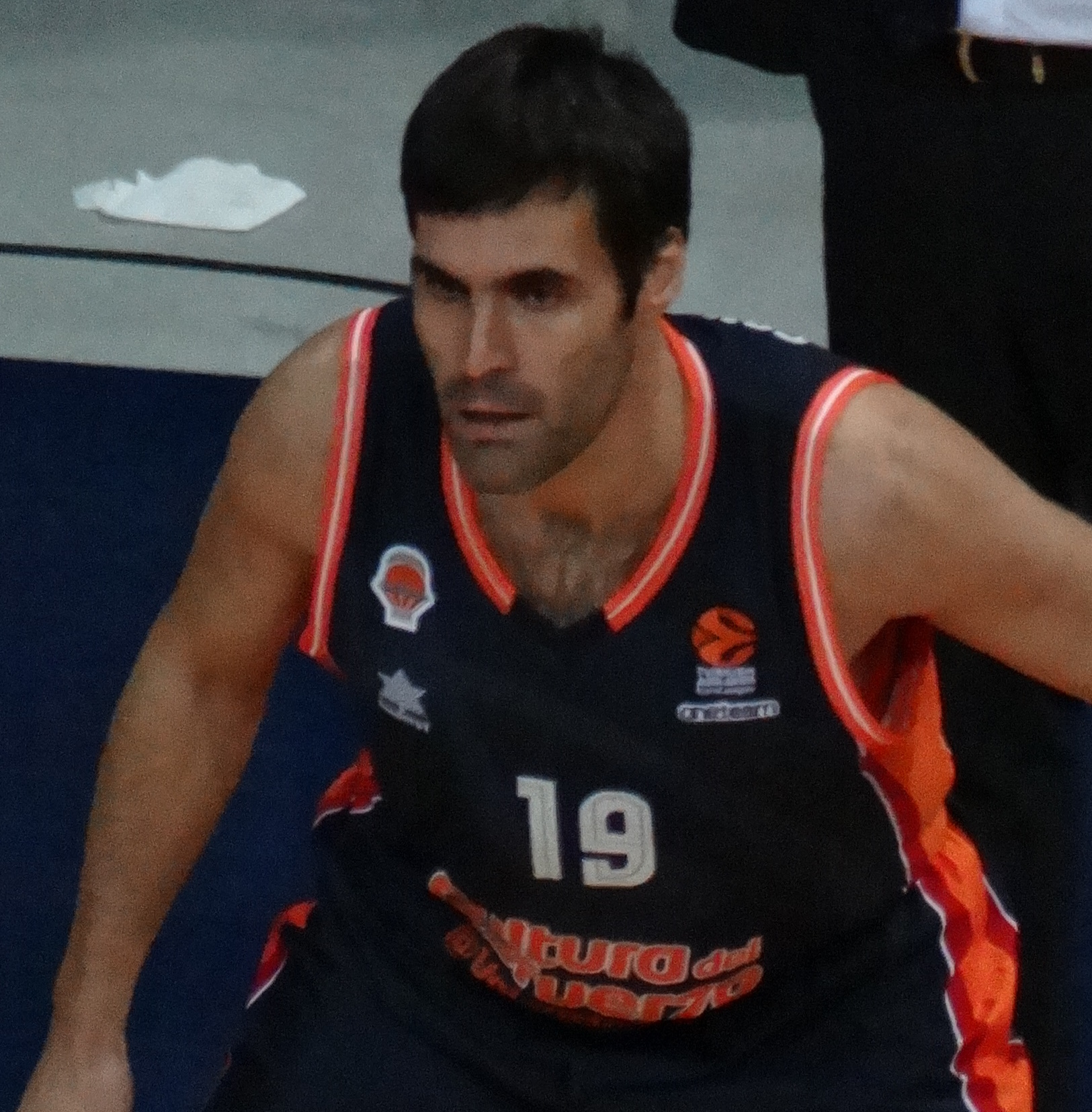
- San Emeterio in 2017, with the Valencia Basket.

Personal information
- Born: 1 January 1984 (age 42) Santander, Spain
- Listed height: 6 ft 6.5 in (1.99 m)
- Listed weight: 232 lb (105 kg)

Career information
- NBA draft: 2006: undrafted
- Playing career: 2001–2021
- Position: Small forward / shooting guard

Career history

Playing
- 2001–2006: Valladolid
- 2006–2008: Girona
- 2008–2015: Baskonia
- 2015–2021: Valencia

Coaching
- 2021–2024: Valencia (assistant)

Career highlights
- EuroCup champion (2019); 2× Liga ACB champion (2010, 2017); All-EuroCup Second Team (2017); All-EuroLeague First Team (2011); All-Liga ACB Team (2011); Liga ACB MVP (2011); Liga ACB Domestic Player of the Year (2011)
Medals
Men's basketball
Representing Spain
Olympic Games
Silver medal – second place	2012 London	Team
EuroBasket
Gold medal – first place	2011 Lithuania
Gold medal – first place	2015 France–Croatia–Germany–Latvia
Bronze medal – third place	2013 Slovenia
Bronze medal – third place	2017 Finland–Israel–Romania–Turkey
Mediterranean Games
Bronze medal – third place	2005 Almería	Team

Fernando San Emeterio Lara (born 1 January 1984) is a Spanish professional basketball coach and former player. He last worked as an assistant coach for Valencia of the Spanish Liga ACB and the EuroLeague.

He was an All-EuroLeague First Team selection in 2011, as well as the ACB MVP the same year.

== Professional career ==
San Emeterio began his professional career with Valladolid, during the 2001–02 season. In 2006, he joined Girona. In 2008, he moved to Baskonia. He was named the ACB MVP in 2011. In 2011, he signed a new four-year contract extension with Baskonia. On 30 June 2015, he parted ways with Baskonia. On 8 July 2015, he signed a two-year contract with Valencia Basket. San Emeterio signed a contract extension on 13 July 2020.

== Retirement ==
On 1 July 2021 San Emeterio announced his retirement from professional basketball.

== Coaching career ==
Following retirement, he has started his coaching career by becoming assistant coach for Valencia Basket of the Spanish Liga ACB.

== Spain national team ==
San Emeterio was a part of the Spain national team that won the bronze medal at the 2005 Mediterranean Games. He also was a member of the senior men's Spain national team that participated at the 2010 FIBA World Championship, and won the gold medal at the EuroBasket 2011. He also won the silver medal at the 2012 Summer Olympics, the bronze medal at the EuroBasket 2013, and the gold medal at the EuroBasket 2015.

== Career statistics ==
Legend
GP	Games played	GS	Games started	MPG	Minutes per game
FG%	Field-goal percentage	3P%	3-point field-goal percentage	FT%	Free-throw percentage
RPG	Rebounds per game	APG	Assists per game	SPG	Steals per game
BPG	Blocks per game	PPG	Points per game	PIR	Performance index rating
**Bold**	Career high

=== EuroLeague ===
*	Led the league

Year	Team	GP	GS	MPG	FG%	3P%	FT%	RPG	APG	SPG	BPG	PPG	PIR
2008–09	Baskonia	20	4	11.0	.403	.286	.882	1.8	.6	.3	**.1**	3.5	3.0
2009–10	Baskonia	20	18	27.9	.484	.426	.800	3.8	2.3	**.8**	—	11.8	14.1
2010–11	Baskonia	20	20	**33.8**	**.569**	**.500***	.771	**5.5**	**2.4**	**.8**	**.1**	**13.7**	**19.1***
2011–12	Baskonia	10	5	28.1	.472	.343	**.960**	4.6	2.1	**.8**	—	12.0	13.4
2012–13	Baskonia	**28**	9	24.3	.464	.338	.772	3.3	2.1	.5	—	9.0	10.1
2013–14	Baskonia	21	**21**	26.7	.496	.435	.793	2.8	2.0	.3	—	9.3	9.2
2014–15	Baskonia	24	7	23.2	.421	.319	.797	3.0	1.8	.5	—	10.3	10.3
2017–18	Valencia	20	10	22.2	.450	.403	.793	2.8	2.3	.3	—	9.4	8.9
2019–20	Valencia	24	15	17.8	.479	.468	.750	1.8	1.6	.4	—	7.3	8.5
2020-21	Valencia	24	5	13.3	.414	.362	.950	1.3	1.3	.3	—	4.9	5.0
Career		211	114	22.4	.473	.393	.806	2.9	1.8	.5	.0	8.9	9.8

== Awards and accomplishments ==
=== Professional career ===
- FIBA EuroCup: 2006–07, 2018–19
- Spanish King's Cup: 2009
- Spanish Super Cup: 2008, 2018
- 2× Spanish ACB League: 2009–10, 2016–17

==== Individual awards ====
- All-EuroLeague First Team: 2010–11
- All-Liga ACB Team: 2010–11
- ACB MVP: 2010–11
- All-EuroCup Second Team: 2016–17

=== Spain national team ===
- 2005 Mediterranean Games: Bronze
- EuroBasket 2011: Gold
- 2012 Summer Olympics: Silver
- EuroBasket 2013: Bronze
- EuroBasket 2015: Gold
- EuroBasket 2017: Bronze
