= Guillem Vives =

Spanish basketball player

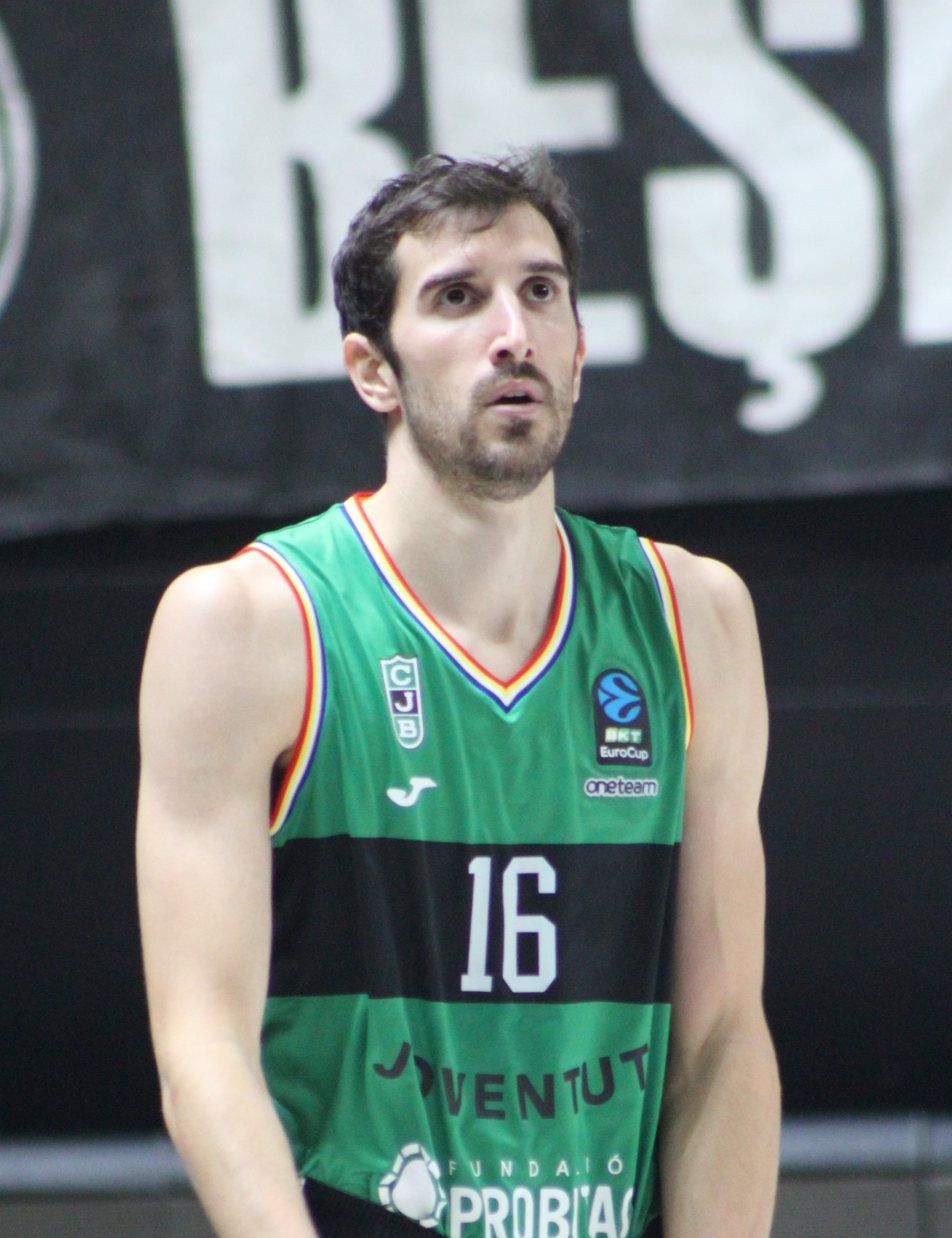
- Vives with Joventut in 2024

No. 16 – Basket Zaragoza
- Position: Point guard
- League: Liga ACB

Personal information
- Born: 16 June 1993 (age 33) Barcelona, Spain
- Listed height: 192 cm (6 ft 4 in)
- Listed weight: 190 lb (86 kg)

Career information
- NBA draft: 2015: undrafted
- Playing career: 2011–present

Career history
- 2011–2013: Prat
- 2013–2014: Joventut
- 2014–2021: Valencia
- 2021–2026: Joventut
- 2026–present: Zaragoza

Career highlights
- Spanish League champion (2017); EuroCup champion (2019); Spanish League Best Young Player (2014); 2x Spanish League All-Young Players Team (2014, 2015)
Medals
Men's basketball
Representing Spain
EuroBasket
Gold medal – first place	2015 France–Croatia–Germany–Latvia
Bronze medal – third place	2017 Finland–Israel–Romania–Turkey
European U-20 Championship
Bronze medal – third place	2013 Estonia	Team
European U-18 Championship
Gold medal – first place	2011 Poland	Team

Guillem Vives Torrent (born 16 June 1993) is a Spanish professional basketball player for Basket Zaragoza of the Spanish Liga ACB. He is also a member of the senior Spain national team. At a height of 1.92 m (6'3 3/4"), he plays primarily at the point guard position.

== Professional career ==
On 7 July 2014 he signed a three-year contract with the Spanish team Valencia Basket.

On 1 July 2021 he signed with Joventut Badalona of the Spanish Liga ACB.

On 2 July 2026 he signed with Basket Zaragoza of the Spanish Liga ACB.

== Spain national team ==
Vives was a member of the junior national teams of Spain. With Spain's junior national teams, he played at the 2011 FIBA Europe Under-18 Championship, where he won a gold medal, and at the 2013 FIBA Europe Under-20 Championship, where he won a bronze medal.

Vives has also been a member of the senior Spain national team. With Spain's senior national team, he played at the EuroBasket 2015, where he won a gold medal, and at the EuroBasket 2017.
