= 2016–17 EuroCup Basketball =

2016–17 7DAYS EuroCup^{1}
- Season: 2016–17
- Duration: 12 October 2016 – 5 April 2017 (competition proper)
- Games played: 146
- Teams: 20 (competition proper)

Regular season
- Season MVP: (Russia) Alexey Shved

Finals
- Champions: (Spain) Unicaja (1st title)
- Runners-up: (Spain) Valencia Basket
- Semi-finalists: (Russia) Lokomotiv Kuban (Israel) Hapoel Jerusalem
- Finals MVP: (Spain) Alberto Díaz

Awards
- Coach of the Year: (Spain) Pedro Martínez
- Rising Star: (Latvia) Rolands Šmits

Statistical leaders
Points	(Russia) Alexey Shved	22.1
Rebounds	(United States) Drew Gordon	9.6
Assists	(Serbia) Stefan Marković	9.1
Index Rating	(Russia) Alexey Shved	22.0

Records
- Biggest home win: Valencia Basket 95–58 ratiopharm Ulm (12 October 2016)
- Biggest away win: Nizhny Novgorod 63–97 Lietuvos rytas (17 January 2017)
- Highest scoring: Alba Berlin 124–115 Lietuvos rytas (2 November 2016)
- Winning streak: 13 games Valencia Basket
- Losing streak: 8 games Budućnost VOLI; MZT Skopje Aerodrom
- Highest attendance: 10,367; Unicaja 79–71 Valencia Basket (31 March 2017)
- Lowest attendance: 80; Budućnost VOLI 95–97 Zenit Saint Petersburg (7 December 2016)
- Attendance: 628,354
- Average attendance: 4,304
- All statistics correct as of 5 April 2017.^{1} Sponsored name, referring to 7DAYS.

The 2016–17 EuroCup Basketball season, also known as 7DAYS EuroCup, for sponsorship reasons, was the 15th season of Euroleague Basketball's secondary level professional club basketball tournament. It was the ninth season since it was renamed from the ULEB Cup to the EuroCup, and the first season under the title sponsorship name of 7DAYS.

The 2017 EuroCup Finals were played between Unicaja and Valencia Basket, and won by Unicaja, which was their first EuroCup title, and their second title overall in a European-wide competition, after they previously won the FIBA Korać Cup 16 years earlier. As the winners of the 2016–17 EuroCup Basketball competition, Unicaja qualified for the European top-tier level 2017–18 EuroLeague season.

== Format changes ==
In April 2016, Euroleague Basketball agreed on a new competition format, with 24 teams that will compete in four groups of six teams, with a double round-robin format. The four first qualified teams of the four groups will compete in four groups of four teams, with a double round-robin format. The two first qualified teams of the four groups will play quarterfinals, semifinals, and the finals, with a best-of-three playoffs.

== Team allocation ==
A total of 24 teams from 12 countries were expected to participate in the 2016–17 EuroCup Basketball, but finally 20 teams from 9 countries participated in the competition.

=== Distribution ===
The table below shows the default access list.

	Teams entering in this round	Teams advancing from previous round
Regular season (24 teams)	4 best-placed teams from Spain; 3 best-placed teams from Adriatic; 3 best-placed teams from Germany; 3 best-placed teams from Italy; 3 best-placed teams from Russia; 1 best-placed teams from Greece; 1 best-placed teams from Israel; 1 best-placed teams from Lithuania; 1 best-placed teams from Poland; 4 wild cards	
Top 16 (16 teams)		4 group winners from the regular season; 4 group runners-up from the regular season; 4 group third-placed teams from the regular season; 4 group fourth-placed teams from the regular season
Playoffs (8 teams)		4 group winners from the Top 16; 4 group runners-up from the Top 16

=== FIBA–Euroleague Basketball controversy ===
In July 2016, Italian clubs withdrew from the competition after several threats from FIBA, and were replaced by Lietkabelis, Krasny Oktyabr, MZT Skopje Aerodrom and Montakit Fuenlabrada. In September 2016, after the withdrawal of AEK, Partizan NIS and Stelmet Zielona Góra due to the pressures and threats they received from FIBA and National Federations, Euroleague Basketball announced that will review candidate clubs to fill the vacancies, but finally reduced to 20 teams.

=== Teams ===
The labels in the parentheses show how each team qualified for the place of its starting round:

- 1st, 2nd, 3rd, etc.: League position after Playoffs
- WC: Wild card
- AV: Allocated vacancy from any withdrawal

Regular season
(Spain) Valencia Basket (3rd)	(Spain) Montakit Fuenlabrada (AV)	(Montenegro) Budućnost VOLI (3rd)	(Germany) Bayern Munich (4th)
(Spain) Herbalife Gran Canaria (5th)	(Russia) Zenit Saint Petersburg (3rd)	(Croatia) Cedevita (4th)	(Germany) Alba Berlin (7th)
(Spain) Unicaja (6th)	(Russia) Khimki (4th)	(Slovenia) Union Olimpija (WC)	(Lithuania) Lietuvos rytas (3rd)
(Spain) UCAM Murcia (7th)	(Russia) Lokomotiv Kuban (5th)	(North Macedonia) MZT Skopje Aerodrom (AV)	(Lithuania) Lietkabelis (AV)
(Spain) RETAbet Bilbao Basket (WC)	(Russia) Nizhny Novgorod (WC)	(Germany) ratiopharm Ulm (2nd)	(Israel) Hapoel Jerusalem (2nd)

== Round and draw dates ==
The schedule of the competition is as follows.

Phase	Round	Draw date	First leg	Second leg	Third leg
Regular season	Round 1	7 July 2016	12 October 2016		
Regular season	Round 2	7 July 2016	18–19 October 2016		
Regular season	Round 3	7 July 2016	26 October 2016		
Regular season	Round 4	7 July 2016	2 November 2016		
Regular season	Round 5	7 July 2016	9 November 2016		
Regular season	Round 6	7 July 2016	16 November 2016		
Regular season	Round 7	7 July 2016	23 November 2016		
Regular season	Round 8	7 July 2016	30 November 2016		
Regular season	Round 9	7 July 2016	7 December 2016		
Regular season	Round 10	7 July 2016	14 December 2016		
Top 16	Round 1	7 July 2016	4 January 2017		
Top 16	Round 2	7 July 2016	10–11 January 2017		
Top 16	Round 3	7 July 2016	17–18 January 2017		
Top 16	Round 4	7 July 2016	24–25 January 2017		
Top 16	Round 5	7 July 2016	31 January–1 February 2017		
Top 16	Round 6	7 July 2016	8 February 2017		
Playoffs	Quarterfinals	7 July 2016	28 February 2017	3 March 2017	8 March 2017
Playoffs	Semifinals	7 July 2016	14 March 2017	17 March 2017	22 March 2017
Playoffs	Finals	7 July 2016	28 March 2017	31 March 2017	5 April 2017

=== Draw ===
The draw was held on 7 July 2016, 13:15 CEST, at the Mediapro Auditorium in Barcelona. The 24 teams were drawn into four groups of six, with the restriction that teams from the same country could not be drawn against each other. For this purpose, Adriatic League worked as only one country. For the draw, the teams were seeded into six pots, in accordance with the Club Ranking, based on their performance in European competitions during a three-year period and the lowest possible position that any club from that league can occupy in the draw is calculated by adding the results of the worst performing team from each league.

Pot 1 Team (Russia) Lokomotiv Kuban (Russia) Khimki (Russia) Nizhny Novgorod (Spain) Unicaja	Pot 2 Team (Spain) Valencia Basket (Germany) Alba Berlin (Germany) Bayern Munich (Spain) Herbalife Gran Canaria	Pot 3 Team (Croatia) Cedevita (Spain) RETAbet Bilbao Basket (Spain) UCAM Murcia (Slovenia) Union Olimpija
Pot 4 Team (Israel) Hapoel Jerusalem (Lithuania) Lietuvos rytas (Italy) Banco di Sardegna Sassari (Poland) Stelmet Zielona Góra	Pot 5 Team (Russia) Zenit Saint Petersburg (Italy) FoxTown Cantù (Greece) AEK (Germany) ratiopharm Ulm	Pot 6 Team (Montenegro) Budućnost VOLI (Serbia) Partizan NIS (Italy) Dolomiti Energia Trento (Italy) Grissin Bon Reggio Emilia

== Regular season ==
Location of teams of the 2016–17 EuroCup regular season.
Red: Group A; Green: Group B; Blue: Group C; Yellow: Group D.

In each group, teams played against each other home-and-away in a round-robin format. The four first qualified teams advanced to the Top 16, while the last teams were eliminated. The rounds were 12 October, 18–19 October, 26 October, 2 November, 9 November, 16 November, 23 November, 30 November, 7 December, and 14 December 2016.

=== Group A ===
Pos	Team	Pld	W	L	PF	PA	PD	Qualification	HGC	CED	NIZ	LIE	MZT
1	(Spain) Herbalife Gran Canaria	8	7	1	758	630	+128	Advance to Top 16	—	101–76	98–87	86–67	87–75
2	(Croatia) Cedevita	8	6	2	678	644	+34	Advance to Top 16	97–90	—	92–77	76–80	95–61
3	(Russia) Nizhny Novgorod	8	4	4	659	693	−34	Advance to Top 16	80–106	82–84	—	91–89	88–74
4	(Lithuania) Lietkabelis	8	3	5	626	658	−32	Advance to Top 16	73–92	68–69	72–75	—	90–89
5	(North Macedonia) MZT Skopje Aerodrom	8	0	8	617	713	−96		75–98	85–89	82–97	80–87	—

Source: EuroCup Basketball
Legend: Blue = home team win; Red = away team win.
Rules for classification: All points scored in extra period(s) were not counted in the standings, nor for any tie-break situation.

=== Group B ===
Pos	Team	Pld	W	L	PF	PA	PD	Qualification	KHI	FUE	ALB	LRY	RBB
1	(Russia) Khimki	8	6	2	728	636	+92	Advance to Top 16	—	96–84	88–77	76–71	99–78
2	(Spain) Montakit Fuenlabrada	8	4	4	696	695	+1	Advance to Top 16	89–85	—	105–80	81–70	89–78
3	(Germany) Alba Berlin	8	4	4	681	734	−53	Advance to Top 16	72–102	88–81	—	124–115	88–92
4	(Lithuania) Lietuvos rytas	8	3	5	683	674	+9	Advance to Top 16	93–91	101–84	97–99	—	83–71
5	(Spain) RETAbet Bilbao Basket	8	3	5	645	694	−49		72–91	97–83	77–85	80–76	—

Source: EuroCup Basketball
Legend: Blue = home team win; Red = away team win.
Rules for classification: All points scored in extra period(s) were not counted in the standings, nor for any tie-break situation.

=== Group C ===
Pos	Team	Pld	W	L	PF	PA	PD	Qualification	ZEN	BAY	UCA	UNI	BUD
1	(Russia) Zenit Saint Petersburg	8	6	2	692	655	+37	Advance to Top 16	—	80–77	83–85	82–72	84–79
2	(Germany) Bayern Munich	8	6	2	641	583	+58	Advance to Top 16	88–99	—	92–84	72–69	80–66
3	(Spain) UCAM Murcia	8	4	4	642	646	−4	Advance to Top 16	77–90	79–90	—	83–75	86–77
4	(Spain) Unicaja	8	4	4	623	607	+16	Advance to Top 16	93–86	62–74	89–86	—	93–75
5	(Montenegro) Budućnost VOLI	8	0	8	573	680	−107		95–97	44–68	75–86	62–86	—

Source: EuroCup Basketball
Legend: Blue = home team win; Red = away team win.
Rules for classification: All points scored in extra period(s) were not counted in the standings, nor for any tie-break situation.

=== Group D ===
Pos	Team	Pld	W	L	PF	PA	PD	Qualification	VBC	JER	ULM	LOK	UOL
1	(Spain) Valencia Basket	8	7	1	657	570	+87	Advance to Top 16	—	77–81	95–58	78–77	87–74
2	(Israel) Hapoel Jerusalem	8	5	3	639	640	−1	Advance to Top 16	84–86	—	69–64	90–79	81–69
3	(Germany) ratiopharm Ulm	8	4	4	612	638	−26	Advance to Top 16	60–86	103–77	—	105–101	87–82
4	(Russia) Lokomotiv Kuban	8	3	5	610	605	+5	Advance to Top 16	64–73	88–68	62–77	—	77–64
5	(Slovenia) Union Olimpija	8	1	7	575	640	−65		72–75	74–89	76–72	64–72	—

Source: EuroCup Basketball
Legend: Blue = home team win; Red = away team win.
Rules for classification: All points scored in extra period(s) were not counted in the standings, nor for any tie-break situation.

== Top 16 ==
In each group, teams played against each other home-and-away in a round-robin format. The two first qualified teams advanced to the quarterfinals, while the two last teams will be eliminated. The rounds were 4 January, 10–11 January, 17–18 January, 24–25 January, 31 January–1 February, and 8 February 2017.

=== Group E ===
Pos	Team	Pld	W	L	PF	PA	PD	Qualification	LOK	HGC	FUE	UCA
1	(Russia) Lokomotiv Kuban	6	5	1	484	424	+60	Advance to quarterfinals	—	66–68	86–61	70–60
2	(Spain) Herbalife Gran Canaria	6	4	2	491	465	+26	Advance to quarterfinals	71–86	—	100–76	94–85
3	(Spain) Montakit Fuenlabrada	6	2	4	469	508	−39		87–91	85–75	—	85–69
4	(Spain) UCAM Murcia	6	1	5	445	492	−47		77–85	67–83	87–75	—

Source: EuroCup Basketball
Legend: Blue = home team win; Red = away team win.
Rules for classification: All points scored in extra period(s) were not counted in the standings, nor for any tie-break situation.

=== Group F ===
Pos	Team	Pld	W	L	PF	PA	PD	Qualification	BAY	KHI	LIE	ULM
1	(Germany) Bayern Munich	6	6	0	479	430	+49	Advance to quarterfinals	—	90–74	85–69	101–98
2	(Russia) Khimki	6	4	2	503	493	+10	Advance to quarterfinals	74–96	—	88–80	85–84
3	(Lithuania) Lietkabelis	6	2	4	470	505	−35		72–78	77–89	—	86–84
4	(Germany) ratiopharm Ulm	6	0	6	482	506	−24		57–68	90–95	81–86	—

Source: EuroCup Basketball
Legend: Blue = home team win; Red = away team win.
Rules for classification: All points scored in extra period(s) were not counted in the standings, nor for any tie-break situation.

=== Group G ===
Pos	Team	Pld	W	L	PF	PA	PD	Qualification	JER	ZEN	LRY	NIZ
1	(Israel) Hapoel Jerusalem	6	5	1	521	484	+37	Advance to quarterfinals	—	97–81	84–77	98–76
2	(Russia) Zenit Saint Petersburg	6	3	3	549	522	+27	Advance to quarterfinals	101–81	—	88–79	90–66
3	(Lithuania) Lietuvos rytas	6	3	3	514	472	+42		76–80	86–84	—	99–73
4	(Russia) Nizhny Novgorod	6	1	5	464	570	−106		73–81	113–105	63–97	—

Source: EuroCup Basketball
Legend: Blue = home team win; Red = away team win.
Rules for classification: All points scored in extra period(s) were not counted in the standings, nor for any tie-break situation.

=== Group H ===
Pos	Team	Pld	W	L	PF	PA	PD	Qualification	VBC	UNI	CED	ALB
1	(Spain) Valencia Basket	6	6	0	508	429	+79	Advance to quarterfinals	—	86–62	71–58	85–80
2	(Spain) Unicaja	6	3	3	436	443	−7	Advance to quarterfinals	70–78	—	73–59	83–77
3	(Croatia) Cedevita	6	2	4	452	480	−28		86–89	74–71	—	99–83
4	(Germany) Alba Berlin	6	1	5	475	519	−44		73–99	69–77	93–76	—

Source: EuroCup Basketball
Legend: Blue = home team win; Red = away team win.
Rules for classification: All points scored in extra period(s) were not counted in the standings, nor for any tie-break situation.

== Playoffs ==
In the playoffs, teams played against each other must win two games to win the series. Thus, if one team wins two games before all three games have been played, the game that remains is omitted. The team that finished in the higher Top 16 place will play the first and the third (if it is necessary) legs of the series at home. The playoffs involves the eight teams which qualified as winners and runners-up of each of the four groups in the Top 16.

=== Bracket ===
Quarterfinals
(Russia) Lokomotiv Kuban	75	88
(Russia) Zenit	52	77
(Germany) Bayern Munich	91	67	69
(Spain) Unicaja	82	82	74
(Israel) Hapoel Jerusalem	87	85
(Spain) Herbalife Gran Canaria	67	79
(Spain) Valencia Basket	88	74	92
(Russia) Khimki	82	98	76

Semifinals
(Russia) Lokomotiv Kuban	57	63
(Spain) Unicaja	73	74
(Israel) Hapoel Jerusalem	68	79	75
(Spain) Valencia Basket	83	66	90

Finals
(Spain) Unicaja	62	79	63
(Spain) Valencia Basket	68	71	58

=== Quarterfinals ===
The first legs were played on 28 February, the second legs on 3 March 2017 and the third legs, if necessary, on 8 March 2017.

Team 1	Series	Team 2	Game 1	Game 2	Game 3
Lokomotiv Kuban (Russia)	2–0	(Russia) Zenit	75–52	88–77	
Bayern Munich (Germany)	1–2	(Spain) Unicaja	91–82	67–82	69–74
Hapoel Jerusalem (Israel)	2–0	(Spain) Herbalife Gran Canaria	87–67	85–79	
Valencia Basket (Spain)	2–1	(Russia) Khimki	88–82	74–98	92–76

=== Semifinals ===
The first legs were played on 14 March, the second legs on 17 March, and the third legs, if necessary, on 22 March 2017.

Team 1	Series	Team 2	Game 1	Game 2	Game 3
Lokomotiv Kuban (Russia)	0–2	(Spain) Unicaja	57–73	63–74	
Valencia Basket (Spain)	2–1	(Israel) Hapoel Jerusalem	83–68	66–79	90–75

=== Finals ===
The first leg were played on 28 March, the second leg on 31 March, and the third leg, if necessary, on 5 April 2017.

Team 1	Series	Team 2	Game 1	Game 2	Game 3
Valencia Basket (Spain)	1–2	(Spain) Unicaja	68–62	71–79	58–63

== Attendances ==
Attendances include playoff games:

Pos	Team	Total	High	Low	Average	Change
1	(Israel) Hapoel Jerusalem	77,304	10,091	6,940	8,589	+25.5%
2	(Germany) Alba Berlin	47,435	8,666	5,429	6,776	−9.1%
3	(Spain) Unicaja	64,518	10,367	4,292	6,452	+0.2%^{1}
4	(Spain) Valencia Basket	75,951	7,813	3,996	5,842	−18.9%
5	(Germany) Bayern Munich	48,914	6,265	4,257	5,435	+2.7%
6	(Spain) RETAbet Bilbao Basket	21,658	6,438	4,132	5,415	+12.9%
7	(Lithuania) Lietuvos rytas	37,498	5,933	4,153	5,357	+97.7%
8	(Spain) UCAM Murcia	34,699	5,671	4,321	4,957	n/a
9	(Russia) Lokomotiv Kuban	39,669	5,744	3,166	4,408	−19.6%^{1}
10	(Germany) ratiopharm Ulm	28,779	5,560	3,055	4,111	−7.9%
11	(Lithuania) Lietkabelis	27,063	4,415	3,416	3,866	n/a
12	(Spain) Herbalife Gran Canaria	29,896	5,202	2,393	3,737	−10.1%
13	(Russia) Zenit Saint Petersburg	23,121	4,471	2,065	2,890	+24.6%
14	(Spain) Montakit Fuenlabrada	18,253	3,594	1,251	2,608	n/a
15	(Montenegro) Budućnost VOLI	8,902	4,016	80	2,226	+34.6%
16	(Russia) Khimki	15,750	3,500	1,350	1,969	−29.9%^{1}
17	(Slovenia) Union Olimpija	7,359	2,371	1,000	1,840	−33.4%
18	(Russia) Nizhny Novgorod	9,369	1,927	754	1,338	−20.3%
19	(North Macedonia) MZT Skopje Aerodrom	5,175	3,432	554	1,294	n/a
20	(Croatia) Cedevita	7,041	1,482	513	1,006	−73.2%^{1}
	League total	628,354	10,367	80	4,304	n/a

Updated to match(es) played on 5 April 2017. Source: EuroCup Basketball
Notes:
1: 2015–16 season average applied to Euroleague games.

== Individual statistics ==
=== Index Rating ===
Rank	Name	Team	Games	Index Rating	PIR
1.	(Russia) Alexey Shved	(Russia) Khimki	14	308	22.00
2.	(United States) DeAndre Kane	(Russia) Nizhny Novgorod	14	301	21.50
3.	(Poland) David Logan	(Lithuania) Lietuvos rytas	14	278	19.86

=== Points ===
Rank	Name	Team	Games	Points	PPG
1.	(Russia) Alexey Shved	(Russia) Khimki	14	310	22.14
2.	(Bosnia and Herzegovina) Elmedin Kikanović	(Germany) Alba Berlin	13	255	19.62
3.	(United States) Ryan Toolson	(Russia) Zenit Saint Petersburg	14	265	18.93

=== Rebounds ===
Rank	Name	Team	Games	Rebounds	RPG
1.	(United States) Drew Gordon	(Lithuania) Lietuvos rytas	14	134	9.57
2.	(United States) DeAndre Kane	(Russia) Nizhny Novgorod	14	107	7.64
3.	(Montenegro) Bojan Dubljević	(Spain) Valencia Basket	20	135	6.75

=== Assists ===
Rank	Name	Team	Games	Assists	APG
1.	(Serbia) Stefan Marković	(Russia) Zenit Saint Petersburg	14	128	9.14
2.	(Argentina) Facundo Campazzo	(Spain) UCAM Murcia	13	87	6.69
3.	(Poland) David Logan	(Lithuania) Lietuvos rytas	14	81	5.79

=== Other statistics ===
Category	Name	Team	Games	Stat
Steals per game	(Argentina) Facundo Campazzo	(Spain) UCAM Murcia	13	2.23
Blocks per game	(Slovenia) Mirza Begić	(Croatia) Cedevita	14	1.29
2PT %	(Lithuania) Artūras Jomantas	(Lithuania) Lietuvos rytas	12	78.00 %
3PT %	(Serbia) Dragan Milosavljević	(Germany) Alba Berlin	13	73.68 %
FT %	(United States) Billy Baron	(Spain) UCAM Murcia	14	90.91 %

=== Game highs ===
Category	Name	Team	Stat
Index Rating	(United States) Ryan Boatright	(Croatia) Cedevita	51
Points	(United States) Pierre Jackson	(Croatia) Cedevita	38
Rebounds	(Lithuania) Artūras Gudaitis	(Lithuania) Lietuvos rytas	16
Assists	(Serbia) Stefan Marković	(Russia) Zenit Saint Petersburg	14
Steals	(United States) Aaron White	(Russia) Zenit Saint Petersburg	7
Blocks	(Slovenia) Mirza Begić	(Croatia) Cedevita	5
Blocks	(Senegal) Hamady N'Diaye	(Spain) Unicaja	5

== Awards ==
=== 7DAYS EuroCup MVP ===
Player	Team	Ref.
(Russia) Alexey Shved	(Russia) Khimki	

=== 7DAYS EuroCup Finals MVP ===
Player	Team	Ref.
(Spain) Alberto Díaz	(Spain) Unicaja	

=== All–7DAYS EuroCup Teams ===
Position	All–7DAYS EuroCup First Team		All–7DAYS EuroCup Second Team		Ref
Position	Player	Club	Player	Club	Ref
G	(United States) Curtis Jerrells	(Israel) Hapoel Jerusalem	(United States) Kyle Fogg	(Spain) Unicaja	
G	(Russia) Alexey Shved	(Russia) Khimki	(United States) Kyle Kuric	(Spain) Herbalife Gran Canaria	
F	(United States) Mardy Collins	(Russia) Lokomotiv Kuban	(Spain) Fernando San Emeterio	(Spain) Valencia Basket	
F	(Serbia) Dejan Musli	(Spain) Unicaja	(Germany) Maxi Kleber	(Germany) Bayern Munich	
C	(Montenegro) Bojan Dubljević	(Spain) Valencia Basket	(United States) Amar'e Stoudemire	(Israel) Hapoel Jerusalem	

=== Coach of the Year ===
Player	Team	Ref.
(Spain) Pedro Martínez	(Spain) Valencia Basket	

=== Rising Star ===
Player	Team	Ref.
(Latvia) Rolands Šmits	(Spain) Montakit Fuenlabrada	

=== Round MVP ===
Regular season

Round	Player	Team	PIR	Ref.
1	(United States) Kyle Kuric	(Spain) Herbalife Gran Canaria	25	
2	(United States) Kyle Kuric (2)	(Spain) Herbalife Gran Canaria	25	
2	(Lithuania) Žygimantas Skučas	(Lithuania) Lietkabelis	25	
2	(Lithuania) Kšyštof Lavrinovič	(Lithuania) Lietkabelis	25	
3	(Georgia (country)) Jacob Pullen	(Russia) Khimki	32	
4	(Bosnia and Herzegovina) Elmedin Kikanović	(Germany) Alba Berlin	35	
5	(United States) Pierre Jackson	(Croatia) Cedevita	37	
6	(Lithuania) Gintaras Leonavičius	(Lithuania) Lietkabelis	31	
7	(United States) Kyle Fogg	(Spain) Unicaja	33	
8	(Russia) Ivan Strebkov	(Russia) Nizhny Novgorod	36	
9	(Bosnia and Herzegovina) Elmedin Kikanović (2)	(Germany) Alba Berlin	33	
10	(Latvia) Jānis Timma	(Russia) Zenit Saint Petersburg	36	

Top 16

Round	Player	Team	PIR	Ref.
1	(United States) DeAndre Kane	(Russia) Nizhny Novgorod	39	
2	(Latvia) Jānis Timma (2)	(Russia) Zenit Saint Petersburg	31	
3	(Poland) David Logan	(Lithuania) Lietuvos rytas	38	
4	(Russia) Alexey Shved	(Russia) Khimki	37	
5	(United States) Tarence Kinsey	(Israel) Hapoel Jerusalem	33	
6	(United States) Royce O'Neale	(Spain) Herbalife Gran Canaria	34	

Quarterfinals

Game	Player	Team	PIR	Ref.
1	(Spain) Fernando San Emeterio	(Spain) Valencia Basket	29	
2	(Russia) Alexey Shved (2)	(Russia) Khimki	22	
3	(Montenegro) Bojan Dubljević	(Spain) Valencia Basket	26	

Semifinals

Game	Player	Team	PIR	Ref.
1	(Spain) Fernando San Emeterio (2)	(Spain) Valencia Basket	31	
2	(Serbia) Nemanja Nedović	(Spain) Unicaja	23	
3	(Spain) Fernando San Emeterio (3)	(Spain) Valencia Basket	21	

== See also ==
- 2016–17 EuroLeague
- 2016–17 Basketball Champions League
- 2016–17 FIBA Europe Cup
