= Bojan Dubljević =

Montenegrin basketball player (born 1991)

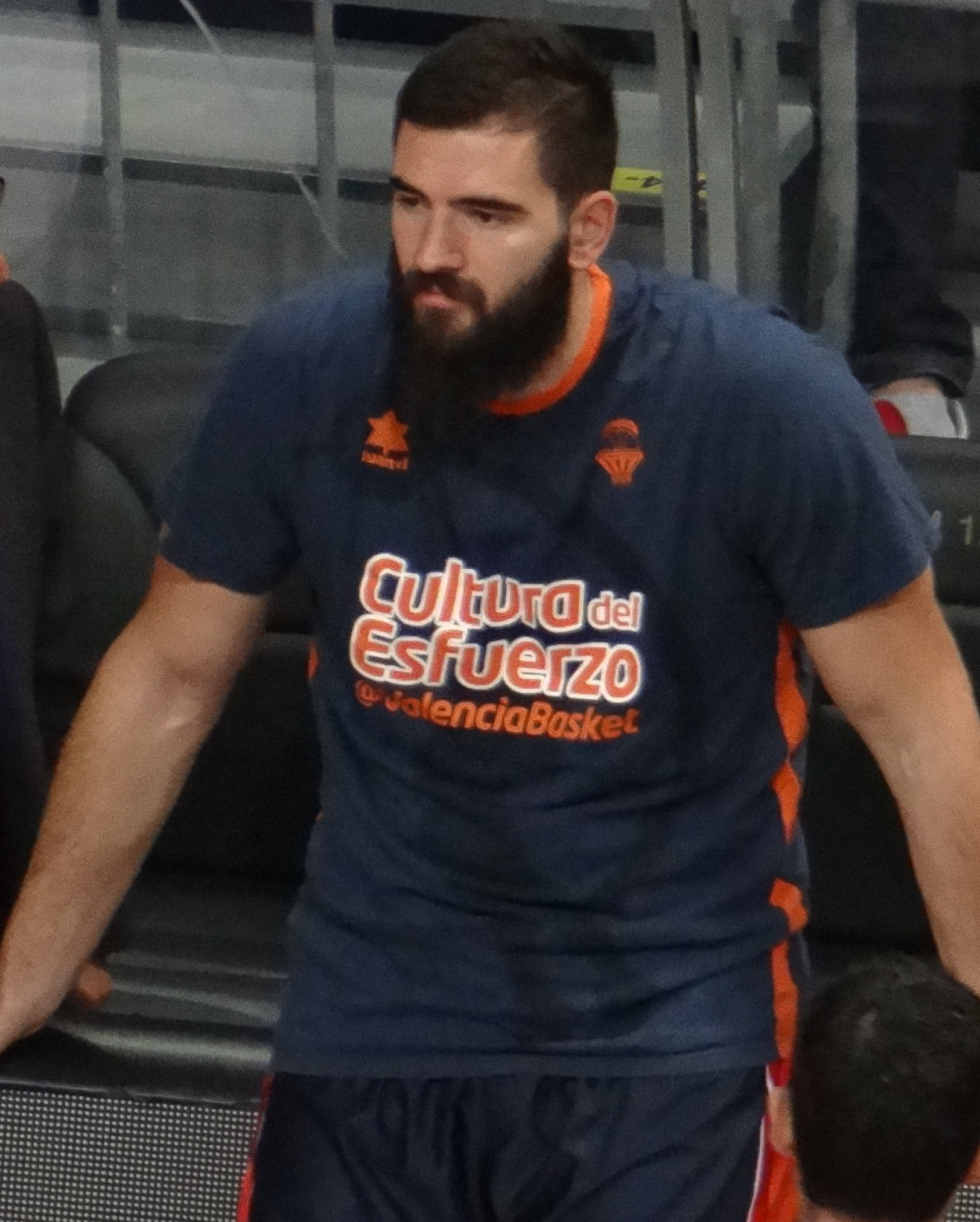
- Dubljević with Valencia in 2017

Personal information
- Born: 24 October 1991 (age 35) Nikšić, SR Montenegro, SFR Yugoslavia
- Listed height: 2.05 m (6 ft 9 in)
- Listed weight: 118 kg (260 lb)

Career information
- NBA draft: 2013: 2nd round, 59th overall pick
- Drafted by: Minnesota Timberwolves
- Playing career: 2009–2026
- Position: Center / power forward
- Number: 14

Career history
- 2009–2010: Lovćen
- 2010–2012: Budućnost
- 2012–2023: Valencia
- 2023–2024: Zenit Saint Petersburg
- 2024–2026: Casademont Zaragoza

Career highlights
- 2× EuroCup champion (2014, 2019); 2× All-EuroCup First Team (2017, 2019); 3× All-EuroCup Second Team (2012, 2014, 2022); 2× EuroCup Rising Star (2013, 2014); Liga ACB champion (2017); 2× Montenegrin League champion (2011, 2012); 2× Montenegrin Cup winner (2011, 2012); Spanish Supercup winner (2017); VTB United League Supercup winner (2023); Liga ACB Finals MVP (2017); 2× All-Liga ACB First Team (2017, 2019); All-Liga ACB Second Team (2018)
- Stats at Basketball Reference

Bojan Dubljević (Serbian Cyrillic: Бојан Дубљевић; born 24 October 1991) is a Montenegrin former professional basketball player. He played 11 seasons for Valencia Basket of the Liga ACB, winning multiple individual and team honors. He also represented the senior Montenegrin national basketball team in national team competitions. Standing at 2.05 m (6 ft 8 3/4 in) tall barefoot, he played at the power forward and center positions.

== Professional career ==
Dubljević started his career in 2009, with Lovćen Cetinje, and he played from 2010 to 2012, with Budućnost Podgorica, before signing with the Liga ACB team Valencia Basket, on a three-year contract. In his first season at Valencia, Dubljević was named the EuroCup 2012–13 season Rising Star of the Year.

In June 2013, he extended his contract with Valencia Basket through the 2015–16 season. The contract included an NBA buyout clause, in the original amount of €1 million. The buyout amount, however, decreased to 200,000 euros in the summer of 2015. In 2017, he won his first Liga ACB championship with Valencia, after beating Real Madrid 1–3 in the finals. Dubljević displayed a strong loyalty to Valencia. In 2018, he referred to playing for the club as his "dream" over going to the NBA.

On 30 June 2023, Dubljević amicably parted ways with the Spanish club after eleven whole seasons together and on 10 July, he signed with Zenit Saint Petersburg of the VTB United League. Dubljević left Valencia as the club's all-time leader in points and rebounds.

On 2 July 2024, Dubljević signed with Casademont Zaragoza of the Liga ACB.

On 14 June 2026, Dubljević announced his retirement from professional basketball.

=== NBA draft rights ===
The Minnesota Timberwolves selected Dubljević in the 2013 NBA draft, at 59th overall. In 2019, his draft rights were traded to the Portland Trail Blazers. On 9 February 2023, Dubljević's draft rights were traded to the New York Knicks in a four-team trade involving the Trail Blazers, Philadelphia 76ers and Charlotte Hornets.

== National team career ==
Dubljević played with the junior national teams of Montenegro, being a part of the All-Tournament team at the 2011 FIBA Europe Under-20 Championship. With the senior Montenegrin national basketball team, Dubljević played at the 2013 EuroBasket and the 2017 EuroBasket.

== Career statistics ==
Legend
GP	Games played	GS	Games started	MPG	Minutes per game
FG%	Field-goal percentage	3P%	3-point field-goal percentage	FT%	Free-throw percentage
RPG	Rebounds per game	APG	Assists per game	SPG	Steals per game
BPG	Blocks per game	PPG	Points per game	PIR	Performance index rating
**Bold**	Career high	†	Won a EuroLeague championship	*	Led the league

=== EuroLeague ===
Year	Team	GP	GS	MPG	FG%	3P%	FT%	RPG	APG	SPG	BPG	PPG	PIR
2014–15	Valencia	8	2	22.9	.511	**.429**	**.917**	4.1	.9	**.9**	**.3**	**15.5**	16.5
2017–18	Valencia	24	17	20.2	.471	.371	.814	5.0	1.4	.5	.1	10.8	13.3
2019–20	Valencia	26	11	**23.5**	**.514**	.349	.828	**6.5**	1.7	.6	.2	14.2	**18.0**
2020–21	Valencia	**29**	**24**	22.4	.457	.333	.797	5.8	**2.4**	**.9**	.2	9.8	13.6
Career		87	64	22.1	.486	.358	.824	5.6	1.8	.7	.2	11.9	15.1

== Awards and accomplishments ==
Valencia

- EuroCup: 2014, 2019
- Liga ACB: 2017
- Supercopa: 2017

Individual

- All-EuroCup First Team: 2017, 2019
- All-EuroCup Second Team: 2012, 2014, 2022
- EuroCup Rising Star: 2013, 2014
- All-ACB First Team: 2016–17, 2018–19
- All-ACB Second Team: 2017–18
- Spanish League Finals MVP: 2017

Montenegrin junior national team

- 2011 FIBA Europe Under-20 Championship: All-Tournament Team
