= Joan Sastre (basketball) =

Spanish basketball player

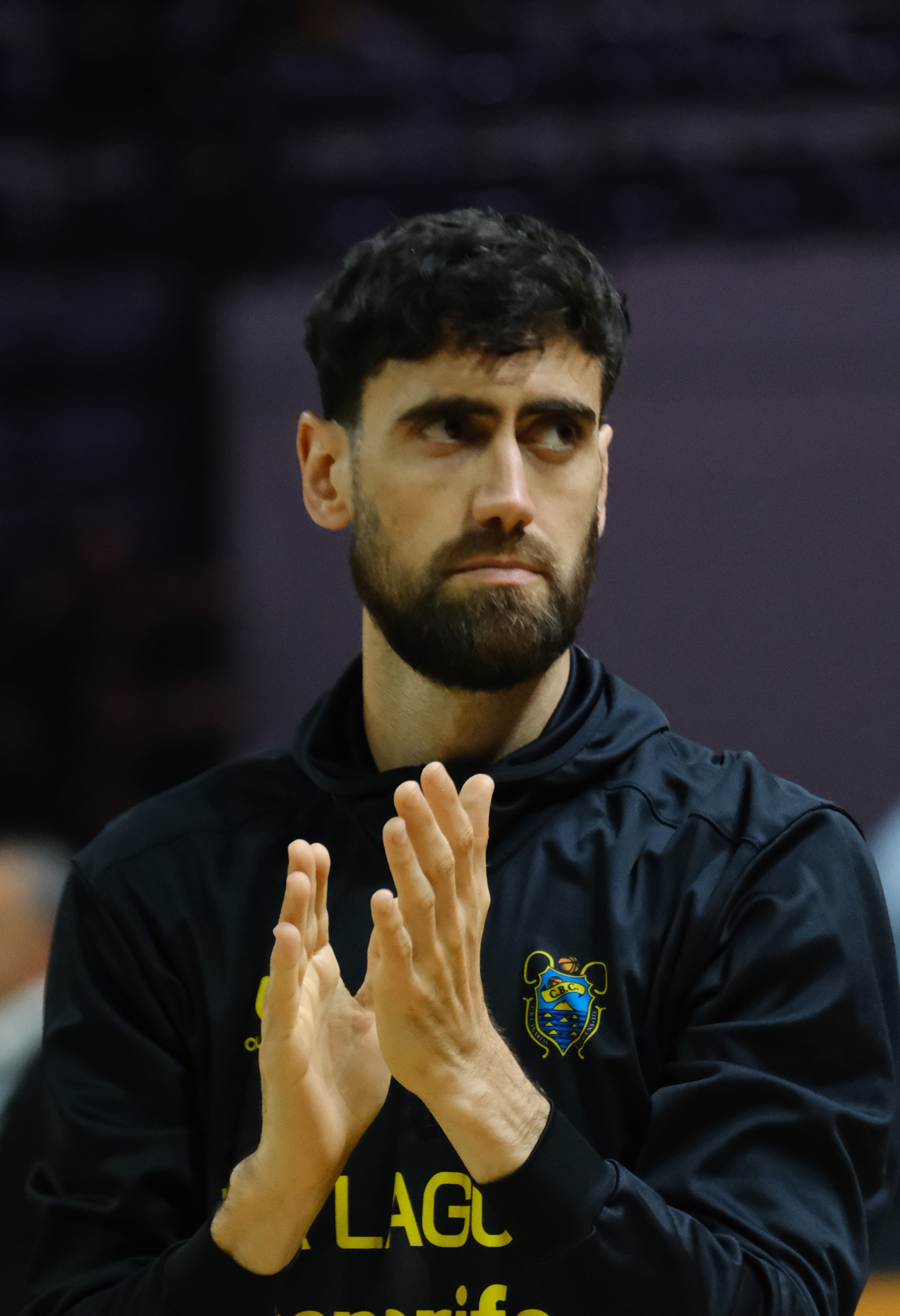
- Sastre with La Laguna Tenerife in 2025

No. 43 – Palmer Basket
- Position: Small forward / Shooting guard
- League: Primera FEB

Personal information
- Born: December 10, 1991 (age 34) Inca, Spain
- Listed height: 2.01 m (6 ft 7 in)
- Listed weight: 86 kg (190 lb)

Career information
- Playing career: 2008–present

Career history
- 2008: Inca
- 2008–2009: Mallorca
- 2009–2014: Sevilla
- 2009–2010: →CB Qalat
- 2014–2016: Zaragoza
- 2016–2021: Valencia
- 2021–2026: Tenerife
- 2026–present: Palmer Basket

Career highlights
- EuroCup champion (2019); Champions League champion (2022); FIBA Intercontinental Cup champion (2023); Spanish League champion (2017)
Medals
Men's basketball
Representing Spain
EuroBasket
Bronze medal – third place	2017 Finland–Israel–Romania–Turkey
European U-20 Championship
Bronze medal – third place	2010 Croatia	Team
Gold medal – first place	2011 Spain	Team

Joan Sastre Morro (born December 10, 1991) is a Spanish professional basketball player for Palmer Basket of the Primera FEB. He is a 2.01 m (6 ft 7 in) tall swingman, as he plays at both the shooting guard and small forward positions.

== Professional career ==
Born in Inca, Balearic Islands, Spain, Sastre spent all of his youth basketball playing career on the Balearic Islands. In 2008, at the age of 17, Sastre debuted in the Spanish 2nd-tier level LEB Oro, with Bàsquet Inca, where he played two games, before signing his first professional contract with Bàsquet Mallorca.

One year later, Sastre agreed with Cajasol, where he would make his debut in the Spanish top-tier level Liga ACB, despite that he was loaned in his first year to Cajsol's affiliated team, CB Qalat of the Spanish 3rd-tier level LEB Plata.

Sastre played in Sevilla for five years, before signing with the Spanish club CAI Zaragoza. Two years later, he moved to the Spanish club Valencia Basket.

On July 2, 2021, he has signed with Tenerife of the Spanish Liga ACB.

On October 11, 2026, Sastre signed with Palmer Basket of the Primera FEB.

== International career ==
Sastre was a member of the junior national teams of Spain. With Spain's junior national teams, he played at the 2009 FIBA Europe Under-18 Championship, the 2010 FIBA Europe Under-20 Championship, where he won a bronze medal, and he also won a gold medal at the 2011 FIBA Europe Under-20 Championship, which was held in Bilbao, while playing with the Spanish under-20 national team.

He has also been a member of the senior Spain national team. With Spain's senior team he played at the EuroBasket 2017.
