= 2026 EuroCup Basketball Playoffs =

Europe secondary club basketball tournament

The 2026 EuroCup Basketball Playoffs began on 11 March with the eighthfinals and ended on 28 April 2026 with the Finals to decide the champions of the 2025–26 EuroCup Basketball. A total of 12 teams from nine countries competed in the playoffs.

Times are CET/CEST, (Note: CET (UTC+1) for dates up to 18 March 2025 (eighthfinals and quarterfinals), and CEST (UTC+2) for dates thereafter (semifinals and finals).) as listed by Euroleague Basketball (local times, if different, are in parentheses).

== Format ==
In the playoffs, teams play against each other in a knockout tournament into four rounds from eighthfinals to finals. At the end of the regular season, the six teams from each group with the most wins qualified for the playoffs. The two top teams from each regular season group received a bye and qualified directly to the quarterfinals. The remaining eight qualified teams entered the eighthfinals to compete in a single-game format in which the third-placed teams of each group faced off against the sixth-placed teams of the opposite groups and the fourth-placed teams of each group faced off against the fifth-placed teams of the opposite groups. The four winning teams from eighthfinals entered the quarterfinals to faced off in a single-game format in the home of the two top teams from each regular season group. The higher-placed regular season team in each matchup enjoyed home court advantage in eighthfinals and quarterfinals. From semifinals onwards, teams play in best-of-three series with the first leg and third leg, if necessary, in the home court of the higher-placed regular season team to crown the EuroCup champion.

== Qualified teams ==
Pos	Group A	Group B	Qualification
1	(Israeli Basketball Association) Hapoel Midtown Jerusalem	(Turkish Basketball Federation) Beşiktaş Gain	Advance to quarterfinals
2	(Turkish Basketball Federation) Bahçeşehir Koleji	(French Federation of Basketball) Cosea JL Bourg	Advance to quarterfinals
3	(Basketball Federation of Slovenia) Cedevita Olimpija	(Basketball Federation of Montenegro) Budućnost VOLI	Advance to eighthfinals
4	(Italian Basketball Federation) Umana Reyer Venezia	(Turkish Basketball Federation) Türk Telekom	Advance to eighthfinals
5	(Spanish Basketball Federation) Baxi Manresa	(Italian Basketball Federation) Dolomiti Energia Trento	Advance to eighthfinals
6	(Romanian Basketball Federation) U-BT Cluj-Napoca	(German Basketball Federation) Niners Chemnitz	Advance to eighthfinals

Source: EuroCup

== Bracket ==
Eighthfinals
(Italian Basketball Federation) Umana Reyer Venezia	90
(Italian Basketball Federation) Dolomiti Energia Trento	94
(Basketball Federation of Montenegro) Budućnost VOLI	82
(Romanian Basketball Federation) U-BT Cluj-Napoca	100
(Basketball Federation of Slovenia) Cedevita Olimpija	73
(German Basketball Federation) Niners Chemnitz	65
(Turkish Basketball Federation) Türk Telekom	98
(Spanish Basketball Federation) Baxi Manresa	81

Quarterfinals
(Turkish Basketball Federation) Beşiktaş Gain	77
(Italian Basketball Federation) Dolomiti Energia Trento	76
(Turkish Basketball Federation) Bahçeşehir Koleji	75
(Romanian Basketball Federation) U-BT Cluj-Napoca	72
(French Federation of Basketball) Cosea JL Bourg	83
(Basketball Federation of Slovenia) Cedevita Olimpija	79
(Israeli Basketball Association) Hapoel Midtown Jerusalem	90
(Turkish Basketball Federation) Türk Telekom	91

Semifinals
(Turkish Basketball Federation) Beşiktaş Gain	91	82	–	2
(Turkish Basketball Federation) Bahçeşehir Koleji	72	72	–	0
(French Federation of Basketball) Cosea JL Bourg	71	76	94	2
(Turkish Basketball Federation) Türk Telekom	99	73	78	1

Finals
(Turkish Basketball Federation) Beşiktaş Gain	60	71	–	0
(French Federation of Basketball) Cosea JL Bourg	72	73	–	2

== Eighthfinals ==
=== Summary ===
The eighthfinals were played on 11 March 2026.

Home team	Score	Away team
Cedevita Olimpija (Basketball Federation of Slovenia)	73–65	(German Basketball Federation) Niners Chemnitz
Türk Telekom (Turkish Basketball Federation)	98–81	(Spanish Basketball Federation) Baxi Manresa
Budućnost VOLI (Basketball Federation of Montenegro)	82–100	(Romanian Basketball Federation) U-BT Cluj-Napoca
Umana Reyer Venezia (Italian Basketball Federation)	90–94	(Italian Basketball Federation) Dolomiti Energia Trento

=== Matches ===
11 March 2026	Türk Telekom (Turkish Basketball Federation)	98–81	(Spanish Basketball Federation) Baxi Manresa	Ankara, Turkey
18:00 (20:00 TRT)	Scoring by quarter: 32–19, 27–29, 19–22, 20–11
	Pts: Bankston, Devoe 18; Rebs: Alexander, Bankston 5 Asts: Devoe 7 PIR: Devoe 22	Boxscore	Pts: Brooks 16; Rebs: Oriola 6 Asts: Bassas, Oriola 4 PIR: Oriola 20	Arena: Ankara Arena; Attendance: 7,113; Referees: Milivoje Jovčić, Sašo Petek, Vassilis Pitsilkas

11 March 2026	Cedevita Olimpija (Basketball Federation of Slovenia)	73–65	(German Basketball Federation) Niners Chemnitz	Ljubljana, Slovenia
19:00	Scoring by quarter: 16–15, 20–24, 18–7, 19–19
	Pts: Stewart 14; Rebs: Kennedy 6 Asts: Gibson 6 PIR: Nikolić 21	Boxscore	Pts: Sow 13; Rebs: Sow 7 Asts: Davis 4 PIR: Yebo 16	Arena: Arena Stožice; Attendance: 5,792; Referees: Ioannis Foufis, Eduard Udyanskyy, Ioannis Tiganis

11 March 2026	Budućnost VOLI (Basketball Federation of Montenegro)	82–100	(Romanian Basketball Federation) U-BT Cluj-Napoca	Podgorica, Montenegro
19:00	Scoring by quarter: 20–29, 18–23, 25–20, 19–28
	Pts: Ferrell 17; Rebs: Boutsiele, Ferrell 6 Asts: Sulaimon 4 PIR: Sulaimon 16	Boxscore	Pts: Molinar 34; Rebs: Ceaser 8 Asts: Russell 7 PIR: Molinar 39	Arena: Morača; Attendance: 3,150; Referees: Carlos Cortés, Vasiliki Tsaroucha, Tomasz Trawicki

11 March 2026	Umana Reyer Venezia (Italian Basketball Federation)	90–94(OT)	(Italian Basketball Federation) Dolomiti Energia Trento	Venice, Italy
20:00	Scoring by quarter: 21–26, 24–21, 19–18, 17–16, Overtime: 9–13
	Pts: Wiltjer 16; Rebs: Wiltjer 7 Asts: Wheatle 6 PIR: Cole, Wheatle 16	Boxscore	Pts: Jones 38; Rebs: Jogėla 12; Asts: Jones, Steward 6 PIR: Jones 38	Arena: Palasport Taliercio; Attendance: 3,413; Referees: Miloš Koljenšić, Maxime Boubert, Hüseyin Çelik

== Quarterfinals ==
=== Summary ===
The quarterfinals were played on 17–18 March 2026.

Home team	Score	Away team
Hapoel Midtown Jerusalem (Israeli Basketball Association)	90–91	(Turkish Basketball Federation) Türk Telekom
Cosea JL Bourg (French Federation of Basketball)	83–79	(Basketball Federation of Slovenia) Cedevita Olimpija
Beşiktaş Gain (Turkish Basketball Federation)	77–76	(Italian Basketball Federation) Dolomiti Energia Trento
Bahçeşehir Koleji (Turkish Basketball Federation)	75–72	(Romanian Basketball Federation) U-BT Cluj-Napoca

=== Matches ===
17 March 2026	Bahçeşehir Koleji (Turkish Basketball Federation)	75–72	(Romanian Basketball Federation) U-BT Cluj-Napoca	Istanbul, Turkey
17:00 (19:00 TRT)	Scoring by quarter: 18–18, 21–20, 22–18, 14–16
	Pts: Flynn 16; Rebs: Williams 16; Asts: Homesley 7 PIR: Williams 17	Boxscore	Pts: Russell 23; Rebs: Ceaser, Guzmán 10; Asts: Russell 4 PIR: Russell 21	Arena: Sinan Erdem Dome; Attendance: 3,248; Referees: Joseph Bissang, Anne Panther, Mario Majkić

17 March 2026	Cosea JL Bourg (French Federation of Basketball)	83–79	(Basketball Federation of Slovenia) Cedevita Olimpija	Bourg-en-Bresse, France
19:30	Scoring by quarter: 18–23, 23–16, 21–16, 21–24
	Pts: Mokoka 20; Rebs: Lindo, McDowell-White 6 Asts: McDowell-White 7 PIR: three players 17	Boxscore	Pts: Kennedy 17; Rebs: Kennedy 8 Asts: Gibson 7 PIR: Kennedy 27	Arena: Ekinox; Attendance: 3,300; Referees: Marcin Kowalski, Manuel Attard, Arnau Padrós

18 March 2026	Beşiktaş Gain (Turkish Basketball Federation)	77–76	(Italian Basketball Federation) Dolomiti Energia Trento	Istanbul, Turkey
18:00 (20:00 TRT)	Scoring by quarter: 17–16, 23–16, 21–25, 16–19
	Pts: Mathews 23; Rebs: Žižić 8 Asts: Lemar 4 PIR: Žižić 20	Boxscore	Pts: Steward 20; Rebs: Jogėla 8 Asts: Jogėla, Steward 3 PIR: Steward 30	Arena: BJK Akatlar Arena; Attendance: 2,850; Referees: Jordi Aliaga, Thomas Bissuel, Sergio Manuel

18 March 2026	Hapoel Midtown Jerusalem (Israeli Basketball Association)	90–91	(Turkish Basketball Federation) Türk Telekom	Belgrade, Serbia
20:00	Scoring by quarter: 25–19, 25–27, 17–17, 23–28
	Pts: Harper 29; Rebs: Wiley 10; Asts: Harper, Winston 4 PIR: Wiley 22	Boxscore	Pts: Allman, Smith 25; Rebs: Alexander 6 Asts: Allman 8 PIR: Allman 31	Arena: Ranko Žeravica Sports Hall; Attendance: 102; Referees: Rain Peerandi, Michele Rossi, Franko Gracin

== Semifinals ==
=== Summary ===
The first legs were played on 31 March, the second legs on 3 April and the third legs on 8 April 2026.

Team 1	Series	Team 2	1st leg	2nd leg	3rd leg
Cosea JL Bourg (French Federation of Basketball)	2–1	(Turkish Basketball Federation) Türk Telekom	71–99	76–73	94–78
Beşiktaş Gain (Turkish Basketball Federation)	2–0	(Turkish Basketball Federation) Bahçeşehir Koleji	91–72	82–72	—

=== First leg ===
31 March 2026	Beşiktaş Gain (Turkish Basketball Federation)	91–72	(Turkish Basketball Federation) Bahçeşehir Koleji	Istanbul, Turkey
19:00 (20:00 TRT)	Scoring by quarter: 14–25, 23–14, 30–15, 24–18
	Pts: Mathews 21; Rebs: Žižić 6 Asts: Dotson 6 PIR: Dotson, Mathews 21	Boxscore	Pts: Flynn 19; Rebs: Williams 7 Asts: Flynn 3 PIR: Flynn 24	Arena: BJK Akatlar Arena; Attendance: 3,200; Referees: Alberto Baena, Hugues Thépénier, Christian Theis

31 March 2026	Cosea JL Bourg (French Federation of Basketball)	71–99	(Turkish Basketball Federation) Türk Telekom	Bourg-en-Bresse, France
20:00	Scoring by quarter: 13–32, 13–22, 27–23, 18–22
	Pts: Mokoka 16; Rebs: Gach, Kokila 4 Asts: McGhee 4 PIR: Gach, Mokoka 15	Boxscore	Pts: Allman 19; Rebs: Bankston, Simonović 7 Asts: Özdemiroğlu 6 PIR: Allman 27	Arena: Ekinox; Attendance: 3,520; Referees: Kristaps Konstantinovs, Uroš Obrknežević, Dragan Porobić

=== Second leg ===
3 April 2026	Bahçeşehir Koleji (Turkish Basketball Federation)	72–82	(Turkish Basketball Federation) Beşiktaş Gain	Istanbul, Turkey
18:00 (19:00 TRT)	Scoring by quarter: 22–22, 14–15, 20–26, 16–19
	Pts: Flynn 16; Rebs: Williams 12; Asts: Cavanaugh 4 PIR: Williams 15	Boxscore	Pts: Lemar 18; Rebs: Žižić 7 Asts: Uğurlu 5 PIR: Dotson, Lemar 21	Arena: Sinan Erdem Dome; Attendance: 12,525; Referees: Miguel Ángel Pérez, Thomas Bissuel, Guido Giovannetti

3 April 2026	Türk Telekom (Turkish Basketball Federation)	73–76	(French Federation of Basketball) Cosea JL Bourg	Ankara, Turkey
19:00 (20:00 TRT)	Scoring by quarter: 18–26, 21–9, 20–21, 14–20
	Pts: Allman 25; Rebs: Simonović 8 Asts: Allman, Özdemiroğlu 3 PIR: Allman 26	Boxscore	Pts: Gach, Moularé 15; Rebs: Kokila 9 Asts: McDowell-White 5 PIR: McDowell-White 16	Arena: Ankara Arena; Attendance: 9,871; Referees: Emilio Pérez, Steve Bittner, Stefan Ćalić

=== Third leg ===
8 April 2026	Cosea JL Bourg (French Federation of Basketball)	94–78	(Turkish Basketball Federation) Türk Telekom	Bourg-en-Bresse, France
19:30	Scoring by quarter: 26–16, 17–23, 25–20, 26–19
	Pts: Gach 21; Rebs: Gach, Lindo 6 Asts: McGhee 7 PIR: Gach 26	Boxscore	Pts: Smith 18; Rebs: Bankston 5 Asts: Devoe 5 PIR: Bankston, Smith 16	Arena: Ekinox; Attendance: 3,500; Referees: Ioannis Foufis, Carlos Cortés, Josip Radojković

== Finals ==
=== Summary ===
The first leg was played on 22 April, the second leg on 28 April and the third leg on 1 May 2026, if necessary.

Team 1	Series	Team 2	1st leg	2nd leg	3rd leg
Beşiktaş Gain (Turkish Basketball Federation)	0–2	(French Federation of Basketball) Cosea JL Bourg	60–72	71–73	—

=== First leg ===
22 April 2026	Beşiktaş Gain (Turkish Basketball Federation)	60–72	(French Federation of Basketball) Cosea JL Bourg	Istanbul, Turkey
19:00 (20:00 TRT)	Scoring by quarter: 10–18, 16–17, 15–20, 19–17
	Pts: Brown 14; Rebs: Žižić 8 Asts: Dotson 6 PIR: Žižić 22	Boxscore	Pts: Mokoka 14; Rebs: Lindo, Mokoka 9 Asts: McDowell-White 5 PIR: Mokoka 19	Arena: BJK Akatlar Arena; Attendance: 3,100; Referees: Miguel Angel Perez, Milos Koljensic, Alberto Baena

=== Second leg ===
28 April 2026	Cosea JL Bourg (French Federation of Basketball)	73–71	(Turkish Basketball Federation) Beşiktaş Gain	Bourg-en-Bresse, France
19:30	Scoring by quarter: 25–17, 13–23, 17–12, 18–19
	Pts: Kokila 18; Rebs: Mokoka 10; Asts: Lindo 4 PIR: Kokila 27	Boxscore	Pts: Mathews 18; Rebs: Žižić 8 Asts: Uğurlu 4 PIR: Žižić 23	Arena: Ekinox; Attendance: 3,500; Referees: Tomislav Hordov, Marcin Kowalski, Manuel Attard

== See also ==
- 2026 EuroLeague Playoffs
- 2025–26 EuroCup Basketball
