= Ramel Curry =

American professional basketball player

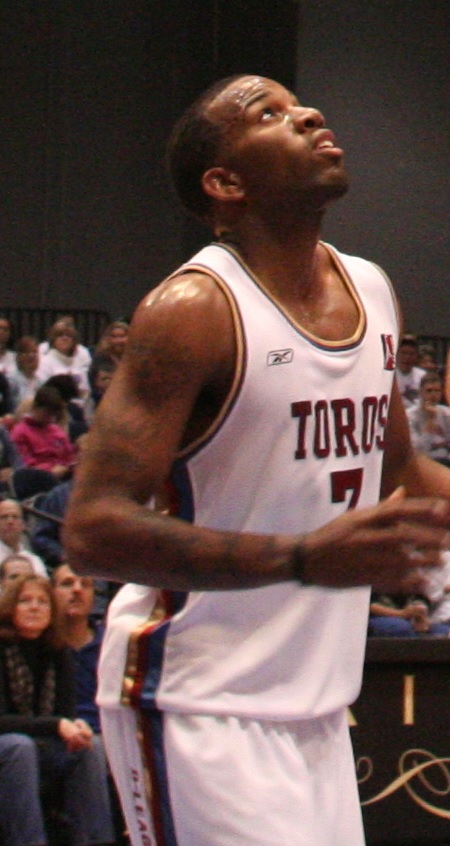
- Curry with the Austin Toros in 2006

Personal information
- Born: April 17, 1980 (age 46) Brooklyn, New York, U.S.
- Listed height: 6 ft 3.75 in (1.92 m)
- Listed weight: 200 lb (91 kg)

Career information
- High school: Martin Van Buren (Queens Village, New York)
- College: Fresno CC (1998–2000); Cal State Bakersfield (2000–2002)
- NBA draft: 2002: undrafted
- Playing career: 2002–2019
- Position: Point guard / shooting guard

Career history
- 2002: Kern County Vipers
- 2003–2004: Tijuana Diablos
- 2004–2005: Long Beach Jam
- 2005: Columbus Riverdragons
- 2005: Cocodrilos de Caracas
- 2005–2006: Austin Toros
- 2006: Constituyentes de San Cristobal
- 2006–2007: Scandone Avellino
- 2007–2008: Hapoel Jerusalem
- 2008–2009: Scavolini Pesaro
- 2009: Erdemirspor
- 2010–2011: Azovmash
- 2011–2013: Donetsk
- 2013–2014: Panathinaikos
- 2014–2015: Limoges CSP
- 2015: Virtus Roma
- 2015–2018: Al Mouttahed Tripoli
- 2019: Sagesse Club

Career highlights
- 2× Ukrainian League MVP (2011–2012); VTB United League MVP (2011); EuroCup Top Scorer (2012); All-EuroCup Second Team (2012); Greek Cup Finals MVP (2014); Greek Cup Finals Top Scorer (2014)

Ramel Antwone Curry (born April 17, 1980) is an American former professional basketball player. Standing at 6 ft 3.75 in (1.92 m), he played both guard positions.

== College career ==
After playing high school basketball, Curry played college basketball at Fresno City College and at NCAA Division II California State University, Bakersfield. Curry played two seasons with the Cal State Bakersfield Roadrunners from 2000 to 2002.

== Professional career ==
Curry won the Israeli Cup with Hapoel Jerusalem in 2008. He won the Ukrainian League championship in 2010 with Azovmash, and in 2012 with Donetsk. After winning the Greek League championship with Panathinaikos in 2013, he re-signed with the club.

His next season was successful, as he won the Greek Cup, being named the MVP of the final, and the Greek League championship with Panathinaikos. In 2014, Panathinaikos released him.

For the 2014–15 season, Curry signed with the Pro A and EuroLeague team Limoges CSP. On March 10, 2015, he left Limoges and signed with Virtus Roma of the Italian LBA for the rest of the season.

== Awards and accomplishments ==
=== College career ===
- NABC NCAA Division II All-District First Team: (2002)
- Daktronics West Region First Team: (2002)
- California Collegiate Athletic Association Player of the Year: (2002)
- NCAA Division II Third Team All American: (2002)

=== Pro career ===
- Israeli Cup Winner: (2008)
- 2× Ukrainian League Champion: (2010, 2012)
- 2× Ukrainian League MVP: (2011, 2012)
- VTB United League MVP: (2011)
- EuroCup Top Scorer: (2012)
- All-EuroCup Second Team: (2012)
- 2× Greek League Champion: (2013, 2014)
- Greek Cup Winner: (2014)
- Greek Cup Final Top Scorer: (2014)
- Greek Cup Final MVP: (2014)
