= 2025–26 EuroCup Basketball =

European basketball competition

2025–26 BKT EuroCup^{1}
- Season: 2025–26
- Dates: 30 September 2025 – 1 May 2026
- Teams: 20

Regular season
- Season MVP: (United States) Jared Harper (Hapoel Jerusalem)

Finals
- Champions: (French Federation of Basketball) Cosea JL Bourg (1st title)
- Runners-up: (Turkish Basketball Federation) Beşiktaş Gain
- Semi-finalists: (Turkish Basketball Federation) Bahçeşehir Koleji (Turkey) Türk Telekom
- Finals MVP: (France) Adam Mokoka

Awards
- Coach of the Year: (Serbia) Dušan Alimpijević
- Rising Star: (Denmark) Tobias Jensen

Statistical leaders
Points	(Romania) Daron Russell	19.8
Rebounds	(United States) Austin Wiley	9.5
Assists	(Lithuania) Arnas Velička	7.7
Steals	(Turkey) Doğuş Özdemiroğlu	2.0
Blocks	(Nigeria) Akobundu-Ehiogu	1.6
Index Rating	(United States) DeVante' Jones	23.3

Records
- Biggest home win: Bahçeşehir Koleji 105–68 Hamburg Towers (30 December 2025)
- Biggest away win: Panionios 61–106 Türk Telekom (21 January 2026)
- Highest scoring: Neptūnas 103–118 Reyer Venezia (2 January 2026)
- Lowest scoring: Panionios 56–66 JL Bourg (15 October 2025)
- ^{1} Sponsored name, referring to BKT.

The 2025–26 EuroCup Basketball season is the 24th season of Euroleague Basketball's secondary level professional club basketball tournament. It is the 18th season since it was renamed from the ULEB Cup to the EuroCup, and the third season under the new title sponsorship name of BKT. The season began on 30 September 2025 and will end at the latest on 1 May 2026 with the Finals.

== Team allocation ==
The 2025–26 EuroCup season features 20 teams from 13 countries. On June 19, 2025, Euroleague Basketball confirmed the team list for the season.

=== Teams ===
League positions after the playoffs of the previous season are shown in parentheses.

Qualified teams for 2025–26 EuroCup Basketball (by entry round)
Regular season
(German Basketball Federation) ratiopharm Ulm (2nd)	(Italian Basketball Federation) Dolomiti Energia Trento (5th)
(German Basketball Federation) Niners Chemnitz (6th)	(Italian Basketball Federation) Umana Reyer Venezia (8th)
(German Basketball Federation) Veolia Towers Hamburg (13th)	(Lithuanian Basketball Federation) Lietkabelis (3rd)
(Turkish Basketball Federation) Beşiktaş Gain (2nd)	(Lithuanian Basketball Federation) Neptūnas (8th)
(Turkish Basketball Federation) Bahçeşehir Koleji (4th)	(French Federation of Basketball) Cosea JL Bourg (4th)
(Turkish Basketball Federation) Türk Telekom (8th)	(Israeli Basketball Association) Hapoel Midtown Jerusalem
(Basketball Federation of Montenegro) Budućnost VOLI (2nd)	(Polish Basketball Federation) Śląsk Wrocław (9th)
(Basketball Federation of Slovenia) Cedevita Olimpija (6th)	(Romanian Basketball Federation) U-BT Cluj-Napoca (1st)
(Hellenic Basketball Federation) Panionios Cosmorama Travel (7th)	(Spanish Basketball Federation) Baxi Manresa (10th)
(Hellenic Basketball Federation) Aris Betsson (9th)	(British Basketball) London Lions (1st)

Notes

1. ABA League (ABA): Budućnost VOLI and Cedevita Olimpija qualified through the ABA League.
2. Israel (ISR): Hapoel Bank Yahav Jerusalem finished as finalist of the Israeli League that was cancelled before the last championship game of the Finals due to the Twelve-Day War.

== Round and draw dates ==
The schedule of the competition is as follows.

Schedule for 2025–26 EuroCup Basketball
Phase	Round	Draw date	First leg	Second leg	Third leg
Regular season	Round 1	4 July 2025	30 September–1 October 2025		
Regular season	Round 2	4 July 2025	7–8 October 2025		
Regular season	Round 3	4 July 2025	14–15 October 2025		
Regular season	Round 4	4 July 2025	21–22 October 2025		
Regular season	Round 5	4 July 2025	28–29 October 2025		
Regular season	Round 6	4 July 2025	4–5 November 2025		
Regular season	Round 7	4 July 2025	11–12 November 2025		
Regular season	Round 8	4 July 2025	18–19 November 2025		
Regular season	Round 9	4 July 2025	4–5 December 2025		
Regular season	Round 10	4 July 2025	9–10 December 2025		
Regular season	Round 11	4 July 2025	16–17 December 2025		
Regular season	Round 12	4 July 2025	30 December 2025–2 January 2026		
Regular season	Round 13	4 July 2025	6–7 January 2026		
Regular season	Round 14	4 July 2025	13–14 January 2026		
Regular season	Round 15	4 July 2025	20–21 January 2026		
Regular season	Round 16	4 July 2025	27–28 January 2026		
Regular season	Round 17	4 July 2025	3–4 February 2026		
Regular season	Round 18	4 July 2025	10–11 February 2026		
Playoffs	Eighthfinals	4 July 2025	10–11 March 2026		
Playoffs	Quarterfinals	4 July 2025	17–18 March 2026		
Playoffs	Semifinals	4 July 2025	31 March 2026	3 April 2026	8 April 2026
Playoffs	Finals	4 July 2025	22 April 2026	28 April 2026	1 May 2026

=== Draw ===
The draw was held on 4 July 2025 in Barcelona, Spain.

The 20 teams were drawn into two groups of 10, with the restriction that teams from the same league could not be drawn against each other, except when there were more than two teams from the same league participating in the regular season. For the draw, the teams were seeded into 10 pots, in accordance with the Club Ranking, based on their performance in European competitions during a three-year period and the lowest possible position that any club from that league can occupy in the draw is calculated by adding the results of the worst performing team from each league.

Pot 1 Team (Israeli Basketball Association) Hapoel Midtown Jerusalem (Turkish Basketball Federation) Türk Telekom	Pot 2 Team (French Federation of Basketball) Cosea JL Bourg (Spanish Basketball Federation) Baxi Manresa
Pot 3 Team (German Basketball Federation) ratiopharm Ulm (Romanian Basketball Federation) U-BT Cluj-Napoca	Pot 4 Team (Turkish Basketball Federation) Beşiktaş Gain (Turkish Basketball Federation) Bahçeşehir Koleji
Pot 5 Team (Italian Basketball Federation) Umana Reyer Venezia (Basketball Federation of Montenegro) Budućnost VOLI	Pot 6 Team (Hellenic Basketball Federation) Aris Betsson (Hellenic Basketball Federation) Panionios Cosmorama Travel
Pot 7 Team (Lithuanian Basketball Federation) Lietkabelis (Lithuanian Basketball Federation) Neptūnas	Pot 8 Team (Italian Basketball Federation) Dolomiti Energia Trento (Basketball Federation of Slovenia) Cedevita Olimpija
Pot 9 Team (German Basketball Federation) Veolia Towers Hamburg (German Basketball Federation) Niners Chemnitz	Pot 10 Team (British Basketball) London Lions (Polish Basketball Federation) Śląsk Wrocław

The fixtures were decided after the draw, using a computer draw not shown to public, with the following match sequence:

Note: Positions for scheduling do not use the seeding pots, e.g., Team 1 is not necessarily the team from Pot 1 in the draw.

Round	Matches
Round 1	10 v 5, 6 v 4, 7 v 3, 8 v 2, 9 v 1
Round 2	1 v 10, 2 v 9, 3 v 8, 4 v 7, 5 v 6
Round 3	10 v 6, 7 v 5, 8 v 4, 9 v 3, 1 v 2
Round 4	2 v 10, 3 v 1, 4 v 9, 5 v 8, 6 v 7
Round 5	10 v 7, 8 v 6, 9 v 5, 1 v 4, 2 v 3
Round 6	3 v 10, 4 v 2, 5 v 1, 6 v 9, 7 v 8
Round 7	10 v 8, 9 v 7, 1 v 6, 2 v 5, 3 v 4
Round 8	10 v 4, 5 v 3, 6 v 2, 7 v 1, 8 v 9
Round 9	9 v 10, 1 v 8, 2 v 7, 3 v 6, 4 v 5

Round	Matches
Round 10	5 v 10, 4 v 6, 3 v 7, 2 v 8, 1 v 9
Round 11	10 v 1, 9 v 2, 8 v 3, 7 v 4, 6 v 5
Round 12	6 v 10, 5 v 7, 4 v 8, 3 v 9, 2 v 1
Round 13	10 v 2, 1 v 3, 9 v 4, 8 v 5, 7 v 6
Round 14	7 v 10, 6 v 8, 5 v 9, 4 v 1, 3 v 2
Round 15	10 v 3, 2 v 4, 1 v 5, 9 v 6, 8 v 7
Round 16	8 v 10, 7 v 9, 6 v 1, 5 v 2, 4 v 3
Round 17	4 v 10, 3 v 5, 2 v 6, 1 v 7, 9 v 8
Round 18	10 v 9, 8 v 1, 7 v 2, 6 v 3, 5 v 4

There were scheduling restrictions: for example, teams from the same city in general were not scheduled to play at home on the same round (to avoid them playing at home on the same day or on consecutive days, due to logistics and crowd control).

== Regular season ==
Location of teams of the 2025–26 EuroCup regular season.
Red: Group A; Green: Group B.

The regular season began on 30 September 2025 and concluded on 11 February 2026. In each group, teams played against each other home-and-away in a round-robin format where only six teams advanced to the playoffs. Moreover, the top two teams in each regular season group received first round playoff byes, skipping the eighthfinals to be placed directly into the quarterfinals. At the tail end of the standings, four teams from each group were eliminated after the regular season.

Alongside 14 returning teams from last season, London Lions and Śląsk Wrocław returned to the EuroCup two years later, Neptūnas returned 10 years later, Panionios returned 12 years later, while Baxi Manresa and Niners Chemnitz will make their debut appearance in the EuroCup.

=== Group A ===
==== Standings ====
Pos	Team	Pld	W	L	PF	PA	PD	Qualification
1	(Israeli Basketball Association) Hapoel Midtown Jerusalem	18	13	5	1702	1506	+196	Advance to quarterfinals
2	(Turkish Basketball Federation) Bahçeşehir Koleji	18	12 (Note: Bahçeşehir Koleji 159–135 Cedevita Olimpija)	6	1593	1475	+118	Advance to quarterfinals
3	(Basketball Federation of Slovenia) Cedevita Olimpija	18	12	6	1596	1413	+183	Advance to eighthfinals
4	(Italian Basketball Federation) Umana Reyer Venezia	18	11 (Note: Umana Reyer Venezia 188–168 Baxi Manresa)	7	1593	1538	+55	Advance to eighthfinals
5	(Spanish Basketball Federation) Baxi Manresa	18	11	7	1624	1619	+5	Advance to eighthfinals
6	(Romanian Basketball Federation) U-BT Cluj-Napoca	18	9	9	1714	1657	+57	Advance to eighthfinals
7	(Hellenic Basketball Federation) Aris Betsson	18	8	10	1500	1593	−93	
8	(Lithuanian Basketball Federation) Neptūnas	18	7	11	1637	1725	−88	
9	(Polish Basketball Federation) Śląsk Wrocław	18	5	13	1516	1680	−164	
10	(German Basketball Federation) Veolia Towers Hamburg	18	2	16	1472	1741	−269	

Source: EuroCup
Rules for classification: All points scored in extra period(s) will not be counted in the standings, nor for any tie-break situation.

==== Results ====
Home \ Away	ARI	BAH	MAN	COL	HAP	NEP	WRO	VEN	UBT	HAM
Aris Betsson (Hellenic Basketball Federation)	—	76–86	79–86	60–89	77–96	83–64	85–78	90–86	88–98	98–76
Bahçeşehir Koleji (Turkish Basketball Federation)	81–79	—	92–96	92–76	82–90	85–100	80–82	93–74	84–72	105–68
Baxi Manresa (Spanish Basketball Federation)	113–99	67–81	—	99–82	101–94	97–96	74–62	75–91	101–99	99–72
Cedevita Olimpija (Basketball Federation of Slovenia)	80–59	59–67	76–69	—	81–84	91–94	108–74	93–65	86–80	93–73
Hapoel Midtown Jerusalem (Israeli Basketball Association)	103–76	82–94	105–69	84–99	—	110–93	86–69	98–66	114–104	86–76
Neptūnas (Lithuanian Basketball Federation)	87–93	86–91	100–87	85–104	98–92	—	103–87	103–118	102–107	97–88
Śląsk Wrocław (Polish Basketball Federation)	107–113	99–91	90–96	81–114	72–115	95–85	—	92–104	94–93	92–81
Umana Reyer Venezia (Italian Basketball Federation)	81–85	94–85	97–93	86–84	83–80	89–69	103–76	—	90–83	90–55
U-BT Cluj-Napoca (Romania)	111–92	90–98	110–86	87–93	89–101	118–97	94–92	103–102	—	103–92
Veolia Towers Hamburg (German Basketball Federation)	89–92	85–106	94–116	74–88	85–100	94–98	99–96	95–87	76–95	—

Source: EuroCup
Legend: Blue = home team win; Red = away team win.
Matches with lighter background shading were decided after overtime.

=== Group B ===
==== Standings ====
Pos	Team	Pld	W	L	PF	PA	PD	Qualification
1	(Turkish Basketball Federation) Beşiktaş Gain	18	13 (Note: Beşiktaş Gain 193–159 Cosea JL Bourg)	5	1666	1489	+177	Advance to quarterfinals
2	(French Federation of Basketball) Cosea JL Bourg	18	13	5	1495	1383	+112	Advance to quarterfinals
3	(Basketball Federation of Montenegro) Budućnost VOLI	18	12 (Note: Budućnost VOLI 163–160 Türk Telekom)	6	1598	1461	+137	Advance to eighthfinals
4	(Turkish Basketball Federation) Türk Telekom	18	12	6	1562	1352	+210	Advance to eighthfinals
5	(Italian Basketball Federation) Dolomiti Energia Trento	18	11	7	1486	1513	−27	Advance to eighthfinals
6	(German Basketball Federation) Niners Chemnitz	18	9	9	1449	1458	−9	Advance to eighthfinals
7	(German Basketball Federation) ratiopharm Ulm	18	7	11	1470	1622	−152	
8	(British Basketball) London Lions	18	5 (Note: London Lions 132–127 Lietkabelis)	13	1335	1437	−102	
9	(Lithuanian Basketball Federation) Lietkabelis	18	5	13	1415	1502	−87	
10	(Hellenic Basketball Federation) Panionios Cosmorama Travel	18	3	15	1349	1608	−259	

Source: EuroCup
Rules for classification: All points scored in extra period(s) will not be counted in the standings, nor for any tie-break situation.

==== Results ====
Home \ Away	BES	BUD	BOU	TRE	LIE	LON	CHE	PAN	ULM	TTA
Beşiktaş Gain (Turkish Basketball Federation)	—	96–74	90–60	97–83	94–85	99–73	93–88	101–83	97–76	91–81
Budućnost VOLI (Basketball Federation of Montenegro)	82–79	—	96–84	96–107	95–81	94–63	97–81	91–63	101–71	91–81
Cosea JL Bourg (French Federation of Basketball)	99–103	88–73	—	73–91	93–65	86–85	85–82	81–79	97–66	88–80
Dolomiti Energia Trento (Italian Basketball Federation)	87–74	91–90	48–79	—	78–74	85–73	94–105	88–87	76–68	60–80
Lietkabelis (Lithuanian Basketball Federation)	85–79	91–98	73–86	93–94	—	61–74	79–85	89–62	94–98	74–100
London Lions (British Basketball)	98–96	59–86	68–72	87–71	58–66	—	70–78	97–72	72–73	77–89
Niners Chemnitz (German Basketball Federation)	97–95	71–84	88–82	81–67	86–67	67–68	—	73–68	89–78	63–87
Panionios Cosmorama Travel (Hellenic Basketball Federation)	74–114	97–85	56–66	87–91	72–79	79–78	89–86	—	69–94	61–106
ratiopharm Ulm (German Basketball Federation)	99–101	90–103	64–96	87–100	79–89	87–86	88–76	103–96	—	53–87
Türk Telekom (Turkish Basketball Federation)	84–93	79–72	76–80	92–86	85–75	88–63	79–62	95–67	93–96	—

Source: EuroCup
Legend: Blue = home team win; Red = away team win.
Matches with lighter background shading were decided after overtime.

== Playoffs ==
The playoffs began on 11 March with the eighthfinals and will end at the latest on 1 May 2026 with the Finals. In the playoffs, teams play against each other in a knockout tournament into four rounds from eighthfinals to finals. At the end of the regular season, the six teams from each group with the most wins qualified for the playoffs. The two top teams from each regular season group received a bye and qualified directly to the quarterfinals. The remaining eight qualified teams entered the eighthfinals to compete in a single-game format in which the third-placed teams of each group faced off against the sixth-placed teams of the opposite groups and the fourth-placed teams of each group faced off against the fifth-placed teams of the opposite groups. The four winning teams from eighthfinals entered the quarterfinals to faced off in a single-game format in the home of the two top teams from each regular season group. The higher-placed regular season team in each matchup enjoyed home court advantage in eighthfinals and quarterfinals. From semifinals onwards, teams play in best-of-three series with the first leg and third leg, if necessary, in the home court of the higher-placed regular season team to crown the EuroCup champion.

=== Bracket ===
Eighthfinals
(Italian Basketball Federation) Umana Reyer Venezia	90
(Italian Basketball Federation) Dolomiti Energia Trento	94
(Basketball Federation of Montenegro) Budućnost VOLI	82
(Romanian Basketball Federation) U-BT Cluj-Napoca	100
(Basketball Federation of Slovenia) Cedevita Olimpija	73
(German Basketball Federation) Niners Chemnitz	65
(Turkish Basketball Federation) Türk Telekom	98
(Spanish Basketball Federation) Baxi Manresa	81

Quarterfinals
(Turkish Basketball Federation) Beşiktaş Gain	77
(Italian Basketball Federation) Dolomiti Energia Trento	76
(Turkish Basketball Federation) Bahçeşehir Koleji	75
(Romanian Basketball Federation) U-BT Cluj-Napoca	72
(French Federation of Basketball) Cosea JL Bourg	83
(Basketball Federation of Slovenia) Cedevita Olimpija	79
(Israeli Basketball Association) Hapoel Midtown Jerusalem	90
(Turkish Basketball Federation) Türk Telekom	91

Semifinals
(Turkish Basketball Federation) Beşiktaş Gain	91	82	–	2
(Turkish Basketball Federation) Bahçeşehir Koleji	72	72	–	0
(French Federation of Basketball) Cosea JL Bourg	71	76	94	2
(Turkish Basketball Federation) Türk Telekom	99	73	78	1

Finals
(Turkish Basketball Federation) Beşiktaş Gain	60	71	–	0
(French Federation of Basketball) Cosea JL Bourg	72	73	–	2

=== Eighthfinals ===
The eighthfinals were played on 11 March 2026.

Home team	Score	Away team
Cedevita Olimpija (Basketball Federation of Slovenia)	73–65	(German Basketball Federation) Niners Chemnitz
Türk Telekom (Turkish Basketball Federation)	98–81	(Spanish Basketball Federation) Baxi Manresa
Budućnost VOLI (Basketball Federation of Montenegro)	82–100	(Romanian Basketball Federation) U-BT Cluj-Napoca
Umana Reyer Venezia (Italian Basketball Federation)	90–94	(Italian Basketball Federation) Dolomiti Energia Trento

=== Quarterfinals ===
The quarterfinals were played on 17–18 March 2026.

Home team	Score	Away team
Hapoel Midtown Jerusalem (Israeli Basketball Association)	90–91	(Turkish Basketball Federation) Türk Telekom
Cosea JL Bourg (French Federation of Basketball)	83–79	(Basketball Federation of Slovenia) Cedevita Olimpija
Beşiktaş Gain (Turkish Basketball Federation)	77–76	(Italian Basketball Federation) Dolomiti Energia Trento
Bahçeşehir Koleji (Turkish Basketball Federation)	75–72	(Romanian Basketball Federation) U-BT Cluj-Napoca

=== Semifinals ===
The first legs were played on 31 March, the second legs on 3 April and the third legs on 8 April 2026.

Team 1	Series	Team 2	1st leg	2nd leg	3rd leg
Cosea JL Bourg (French Federation of Basketball)	2–1	(Turkish Basketball Federation) Türk Telekom	71–99	76–73	94–78
Beşiktaş Gain (Turkish Basketball Federation)	2–0	(Turkish Basketball Federation) Bahçeşehir Koleji	91–72	82–72	—

=== Finals ===
The first leg was played on 22 April, the second leg on 28 April and the third leg on 1 May 2026, if necessary.

Team 1	Series	Team 2	1st leg	2nd leg	3rd leg
Beşiktaş Gain (Turkish Basketball Federation)	0–2	(French Federation of Basketball) Cosea JL Bourg	60–72	71–73	—

== Awards ==
All official awards of the 2025–26 EuroCup.

=== EuroCup MVP ===
Player	Team	Ref.
(United States) Jared Harper	(Israeli Basketball Association) Hapoel Jerusalem	

=== EuroCup Final MVP ===
Player	Team	Ref.
(France) Adam Mokoka	(France) Cosea JL Bourg	

=== All–EuroCup Teams ===
All–EuroCup First Team		All–EuroCup Second Team		Ref
Player	Team	Player	Team	Ref
(United States) Jared Harper	(Israel) Hapoel Jerusalem	(United States) Darius McGhee	(France) Cosea JL Bourg	
(United States) DeVante' Jones	(Italy) Dolomiti Energia Trento	(Romania) Daron Russell	(Romania) U-BT Cluj-Napoca	
(Turkey) Malachi Flynn	(Turkey) Bahçeşehir Koleji	(United States) Anthony Brown	(Turkey) Beşiktaş Gain	
(Montenegro) Kyle Allman	(Turkey) Türk Telekom	(South Sudan) Both Gach	(France) Cosea JL Bourg	
(Croatia) Ante Žižić	(Turkey) Beşiktaş Gain	(Australia) Mitch Creek	(Romania) U-BT Cluj-Napoca	

=== Coach of the Year ===
Coach	Team	Ref.
(Serbia) Dušan Alimpijević	(Turkey) Beşiktaş Gain	

=== Rising Star ===
Player	Team	Ref.
(Denmark) Tobias Jensen	(German Basketball Federation) ratiopharm Ulm	

=== MVP of the Round ===
Regular season

Round	Player	Team	PIR	Ref.
1	(United States) Bryce Jones	(Hellenic Basketball Federation) Aris Thessaloniki	33	
1	(Greece) Michalis Lountzis	(Greece) Panionios	33	
2	(United States) D.J. Stewart	(Basketball Federation of Slovenia) Cedevita Olimpija	41	
3	(United States) Chris Ledlum	(German Basketball Federation) Ratiopharm Ulm	29	
4	(Serbia) Dušan Miletić	(Romanian Basketball Federation) U-BT Cluj-Napoca	31	
5	(United States) Jared Harper	(Israeli Basketball Association) Hapoel Bank Yahav Jerusalem	36	
6	(United States) Jared Harper (x2)	(Israeli Basketball Association) Hapoel Bank Yahav Jerusalem	37	
6	(United States) Bryce Jones (x2)	(Hellenic Basketball Federation) Aris Thessaloniki	37	
6	(Canada) (Czech Republic) James Karnik	(Lithuania) Neptūnas Klaipėda	37	
7	(United States) Cassius Winston	(Israeli Basketball Association) Hapoel Bank Yahav Jerusalem	37	
8	(Germany) Kevin Yebo	(German Basketball Federation) Niners Chemnitz	38	
9	(Croatia) Ante Žižić	(Turkish Basketball Federation) Beşiktaş Gain	36	
10	(North Macedonia) Andrej Jakimovski	(Italian Basketball Federation) Dolomiti Energia Trento	43	
11	(Australia) Mitch Creek	(Romanian Basketball Federation) U-BT Cluj-Napoca	43	
12	(United States) DeVante' Jones	(Italian Basketball Federation) Dolomiti Energia Trento	37	
12	(United States) Fatts Russell	(Romanian Basketball Federation) U-BT Cluj-Napoca	37	
13	(Latvia) Rihards Lomažs	(Lithuania) Neptūnas Klaipėda	36	
14	(Croatia) Ante Žižić (x2)	(Turkish Basketball Federation) Beşiktaş Gain	34	
15	(United States) DeVante' Jones (x2)	(Italian Basketball Federation) Dolomiti Energia Trento	43	
16	(United States) Malachi Flynn	(Turkish Basketball Federation) Bahçeşehir Koleji	35	
17	(United States) Jared Harper (x3)	(Israeli Basketball Association) Hapoel Bank Yahav Jerusalem	33	
18	(United States) Tyler Cavanaugh	(Turkish Basketball Federation) Bahçeşehir Koleji	32	

==== Playoffs ====
Round	Player	Team	PIR	Ref.
Eighthfinals	(Panama) Iverson Molinar	(Romanian Basketball Federation) U-BT Cluj-Napoca	39	
Quarterfinals	(United States) Kyle Allman	(Turkish Basketball Federation) Türk Telekom	31	
Semifinals	(United States) Devon Dotson	(Turkish Basketball Federation) Beşiktaş Gain	21.0	

== See also ==
- 2025–26 EuroLeague
- 2025–26 Basketball Champions League
- 2025–26 FIBA Europe Cup
