= DeVante' Jones =

American basketball player (born 1998)

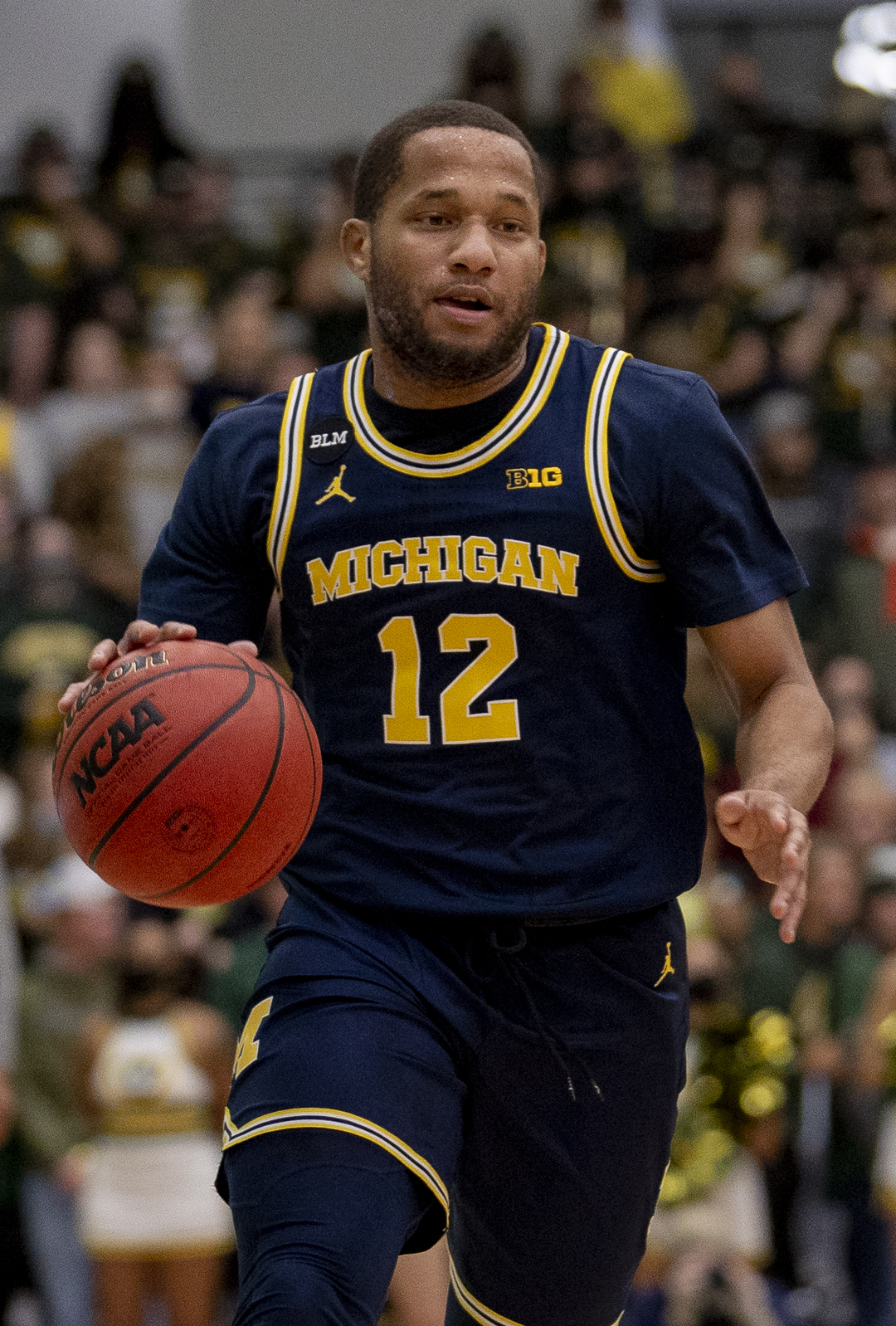
- Jones with Michigan in 2021

No. 3 – London Lions
- Position: Point guard
- League: SLB; EuroCup

Personal information
- Born: April 9, 1998 (age 28) New Orleans, Louisiana, U.S.
- Listed height: 6 ft 0 in (1.83 m)
- Listed weight: 190 lb (86 kg)

Career information
- High school: Tyner Academy (Chattanooga, Tennessee); St. Augustine (New Orleans, Louisiana); Notre Dame Prep (Fitchburg, Massachusetts)
- College: Coastal Carolina (2018–2021); Michigan (2021–2022)
- NBA draft: 2022: undrafted
- Playing career: 2022–present

Career history
- 2022–2023: Metropolitans 92
- 2023–2024: Le Mans
- 2024–2025: Cedevita Olimpija
- 2025–2026: Aquila Trento
- 2026–present: London Lions

Career highlights
- All-EuroCup First Team (2026); Slovenian League champion (2025); Slovenian Cup winner (2025); Sun Belt Player of the Year (2021); First-team All-Sun Belt (2021); Second-team All-Sun Belt (2020); Sun Belt Freshman of the Year (2019)

DeVante' Jones (born April 9, 1998) is an American professional basketball player for the London Lions of the British Super League Basketball (SLB) and the EuroCup. He played college basketball for the Michigan Wolverines of the Big Ten Conference. He previously played for the Coastal Carolina Chanticleers.

== High school career ==
Jones attended Tyner Academy in Chattanooga, Tennessee and led his team to the Region 3-AA championship in 2014. As a sophomore, he averaged 16 points, 4 rebounds and 5.9 assists per game. For his last two years of high school, he transferred to St. Augustine High School in New Orleans, where he helped his team achieve a combined 52–9 record. As a junior, he averaged 16.5 points, 4 rebounds and 6 assists per game. As a senior, he averaged 17 points, 5 rebounds, 6.5 assists and 3 steals per game. Jones played for Notre Dame Preparatory School in Fitchburg, Massachusetts for a postgraduate season where he averaged 25 points, 5 rebounds and 4 assists per game. He committed to playing college basketball for Coastal Carolina.

== College career ==
Jones was ruled ineligible by Coastal Carolina for the 2017–18 season for academic reasons and was granted a redshirt for the second half of the season. He suffered an injury during his second career game and missed his next 12 games. On March 25, 2019, Jones posted a freshman season-high 32 points, seven rebounds and seven assists in a 109–91 win over West Virginia in the second round of the College Basketball Invitational. As a freshman, he averaged 14 points, 3.9 rebounds and 3.6 assists per game, earning Sun Belt Freshman of the Year honors.

Prior to his sophomore season, Jones suffered a broken bone in his left foot during a pick-up game. On March 7, 2020, he recorded 31 points, 14 rebounds and five assists in a 63–62 victory over UT Arlington in the first round of the Sun Belt tournament. As a sophomore, he averaged 17.4 points, 5.8 rebounds, 5.7 assists and 1.7 steals per game. He was named to the Second Team All-Sun Belt after leading the conference in assists. On December 17, Jones reached 1,000 career points while tallying 33 points, seven rebounds and six steals to help his team defeat Delaware State, 99–73. In his following game, he recorded 35 points and five steals in an 86–63 win over Alice Lloyd. As a junior, Jones averaged 19.3 points, 7.2 rebounds, 2.9 assists and 2.8 steals per game. He ranked second nationally in steals per game was selected as Sun Belt Player of the Year and First Team All-Sun Belt.

On May 1, 2021, Jones transferred to Michigan, choosing the Wolverines over offers from Texas Tech, Texas and Memphis.

== Professional career ==
On July 25, 2022, he has signed with Metropolitans 92 of the LNB Pro A.

On June 27, 2023, he signed with Le Mans of the LNB Pro A.

On July 11, 2024, he signed with Cedevita Olimpija of the Slovenian Basketball League and ABA League.

On June 26, 2025, he signed with Dolomiti Energia Trento of the Italian Lega Basket Serie A (LBA).

On June 22, 2026, he signed with the London Lions of the British Super League Basketball (SLB).

== Career statistics ==
Legend
GP	Games played	GS	Games started	MPG	Minutes per game
FG%	Field goal percentage	3P%	3-point field goal percentage	FT%	Free throw percentage
RPG	Rebounds per game	APG	Assists per game	SPG	Steals per game
BPG	Blocks per game	PPG	Points per game	**Bold**	Career high

=== College ===
Year	Team	GP	GS	MPG	FG%	3P%	FT%	RPG	APG	SPG	BPG	PPG
2017–18	Coastal Carolina	Redshirt										
2018–19	Coastal Carolina	23	20	29.8	.461	.337	.818	3.9	3.6	1.3	.0	14.0
2019–20	Coastal Carolina	32	31	**32.8**	**.488**	.296	**.867**	5.8	**5.7**	1.7	**.2**	17.4
2020–21	Coastal Carolina	26	26	**32.8**	.487	**.368**	.862	**7.2**	2.9	**2.8**	**.2**	**19.3**
2021–22	Michigan	**33**	**33**	28.8	.463	.342	.792	4.5	4.6	.9	.1	10.3
Career		114	110	31.0	.477	.336	.845	5.3	4.3	1.7	.1	15.1
