= Horace Jenkins =

American basketball player (born 1974)

Personal information
- Born: October 14, 1974 (age 52) Elizabeth, New Jersey, U.S.
- Listed height: 6 ft 1 in (1.85 m)
- Listed weight: 180 lb (82 kg)

Career information
- High school: Elizabeth (Elizabeth, New Jersey)
- College: Union County (1993–1994); William Paterson (1998–2001)
- NBA draft: 2001: undrafted
- Playing career: 2001–2009
- Position: Point guard
- Number: 5

Career history
- 2001–2002: C.S. Borgomanero
- 2002–2003: Virtus Roma
- 2003–2004: AEK Athens
- 2004–2005: Detroit Pistons
- 2005–2006: Hapoel Jerusalem
- 2006–2007: Efes Pilsen
- 2007: Hapoel Jerusalem
- 2007–2008: Fortitudo Bologna
- 2008–2009: Juvecaserta Basket

Career highlights
- EuroCup Top Scorer (2006); NABC Division III Player of the Year (2001)
- Stats at NBA.com
- Stats at Basketball Reference

Horace Jenkins (born October 14, 1974) is an American former professional basketball player who played in the National Basketball Association (NBA) and several teams in Europe and Israel.

== High school ==
Jenkins graduated from New Jersey's Elizabeth High School in 1993.

== College career ==
Jenkins played one season at Union County College, before leaving to tend to the birth of his son, Hakeem. Over the next three and a half years, Jenkins worked for the United States Postal Service, as an electrician, and on the back of a garbage truck. Once he saved up some money, he decided he wanted to go back to college, and play basketball.

While at William Paterson University, Jenkins was a three-time Division III Player of the Year (1999, 2000, and 2001). He was also a three-time Division III All-American. He holds numerous school records, and also was named 2001 Basketball Times Division III Player of the Year. Jenkins was also the winner of the 2001 ESPN NCAA dunk contest, beating former Division I standout Jeff Trepagnier. USC's Trepagnier, one of college's most prolific high flyers, missed his last dunk attempt, and the 6-foot-1-inch (1.85 m) Jenkins, had one up his sleeve, wrapping it up with a foul line two-foot leaner.

== Professional career ==
Jenkins attended all three NBA pre-draft camps, but he was undrafted in the 2001 NBA draft. In the summer of 2001, Jenkins attended rookie camp with the Orlando Magic, and also received an invitation to training camp with Orlando. However, he declined the invitation, and signed with Cimberio Borgomanero, a team in the Italian second league. He received a guaranteed one-year contract. He spent the 2002 NBA Summer League with the New York Knicks, and the 2003 Summer League with the Seattle SuperSonics.

Horace Jenkins got his break in the summer of 2004, playing in the NBA Summer League with the Detroit Pistons. He was previously playing with AEK Athens of the Greek Basket League, with Pistons draft pick Andreas Glyniadakis. Pistons President Joe Dumars was watching film of Glyniadakis, and spotted Jenkins. Jenkins averaged 20.1 points, 3.3 assists, and 1.8 steals in 12 EuroLeague games with AEK Athens. Impressed, Dumars invited Jenkins to summer camp in 2004. In summer camp, he averaged 8.2 points and 2.8 assists per game in 5 games. That was enough to garner a guaranteed contract from the Pistons, which he signed on August 4, 2004. His contract was a one-year deal worth $385,277.

Jenkins started the 2004–05 NBA season on the injured list, but he did see NBA game action 15 times. He was on the bench for the raising of the Pistons' 2004 championship banner, as well as the Pacers–Pistons brawl. Rumors circulated that he was being traded to the Chicago Bulls, and also that he was going to leave the Pistons, and return to Italy. His NBA debut was a two-minute stint against the San Antonio Spurs. He scored 9 points the next night against the New Orleans Hornets. Jenkins scored a career-high 10 points on December 10, 2004, against the Atlanta Hawks. He was one of only three Pistons to score in double figures in that game. He scored 2 points in his home state of New Jersey against the Nets on February 5, 2005. Five nights later, in a rematch of the 2004 NBA Finals, Jenkins scored 8 points, in only 6 minutes against the Los Angeles Lakers.

Jenkins' final NBA game was on April 20, 2005, in a 86–97 loss to the Charlotte Bobcats where he recorded 6 points, 2 rebounds and 1 steal in 20 minutes of playing time (the most minutes he ever played in a game).

Although he was left off the playoff roster, the Pistons made the NBA Finals for the second straight year. Jenkins was notable for being one of the oldest rookies in the NBA, and his life story was the subject of a short presentation narrated by Jamie Foxx, on ABC, during the 2005 NBA Finals. Jenkins took the long route to the NBA, working to support his family, and then playing in Europe, before signing his first NBA contract, at the age of 29.

In 2005, Jenkins signed a contract with the Israeli team Hapoel Jerusalem, who had gotten sponsored by billionaire Arkadi Gaydamak shortly before. He quickly became the star of the team (rivaling the former star from 2 years prior, Will Solomon, who played for their arch rivals Maccabi Tel Aviv that season), and led it to the EuroCup semifinals and to the Israeli League Finals.

In the summer of 2006, he signed with the Turkish League giants Efes Pilsen. In the middle of the 2006–07 season, he returned to Hapoel Jerusalem, after personal problems with his Turkish head coach arose (after the accusation from the previous year had been dropped), and he helped the team reach the Israeli league Final Four, in which the team lost to arch rivals Maccabi Tel Aviv. On August 3, 2007, Jenkins signed with the Italian League team Climamio Bologna, on a one-year contract.

== Awards and accomplishments ==
=== Pro career ===
- NABC NCAA Division III Player of the Year: 2000–01
- EuroLeague MVP of the Round: 2003–04 Regular season Round 13
- ULEB Cup Top Scorer: 2005–06
- 2005–06 ULEB Cup Most points per game: 20.4
