= EuroCup Basketball All-EuroCup Team =

Annual award of the EuroCup

The EuroCup Basketball All-EuroCup Team is an annual award of the secondary level European-wide professional club basketball league, the EuroCup. The EuroCup is the European-wide professional basketball league that is one tier level below the top-tier level EuroLeague. It is an award for the top ten players of each season of the EuroCup. The award began with the 2008–09 season.

== Selection criteria ==
The All-EuroCup Team was originally selected solely by a panel of the league's basketball experts, from the 2008–09 season, through the 2015–16 season. Starting with the 2016–17 season, online fan voting was added to the award's selection process.

== EuroCup Basketball All-EuroCup Team by season ==
=== All-EuroCup Team prior to online fan voting ===
Player (X)	Denotes the number of times the player was selected to either the First or Second Team.

Player nationality by national team.

Season	Ref.	Pos.	All-EuroCup First Team		All-EuroCup Second Team	
Season	Ref.	Pos.	Player	Club	Player	Club
2008–09		G	(United States) Chuck Eidson	(Lithuania) Lietuvos Rytas	(United States) Khalid El-Amin	(Turkey) Türk Telekom
2008–09		G	(Russia) Kelly McCarty	(Russia) Khimki	(United States) Gary Neal	(Italy) Treviso
2008–09		F	(Slovenia) Boštjan Nachbar	(Russia) Dynamo Moscow	(Russia) Travis Hansen	(Russia) Dynamo Moscow
2008–09		F	(Croatia) Marko Banić	(Spain) Bilbao	(Australia) Matt Nielsen	(Spain) Valencia
2008–09		C	(North Macedonia) Todor Gečevski	(Croatia) Zadar	(Croatia) Sandro Nicević	(Italy) Treviso
2009–10		G	(France) Nando De Colo	(Spain) Valencia	(United States) Arthur Lee	(Czech Republic) ČEZ Nymburk
2009–10		G	(United States) Immanuel McElroy	(Germany) Alba Berlin	(Greece) Kostas Charalampidis	(Greece) Panellinios
2009–10		F	(United States) Devin Smith	(Greece) Panellinios	(United States) Dijon Thompson	(Israel) Hapoel Jerusalem
2009–10		F	(Croatia) Marko Banić (2)	(Spain) Bilbao	(United States) James Augustine	(Spain) Gran Canaria
2009–10		C	(Australia) Matt Nielsen (2)	(Spain) Valencia	(Montenegro) Blagota Sekulić	(Germany) Alba Berlin
2010–11		G	(Croatia) Dontaye Draper	(Croatia) Cedevita Zagreb	(United States) Bracey Wright	(Croatia) Cedevita Zagreb
2010–11		G	(United States) Terrell Lyday	(Russia) UNICS Kazan	(United States) Dwayne Anderson	(Germany) Göttingen
2010–11		F	(United States) Devin Smith (2)	(Italy) Treviso	(Russia) Kelly McCarty (2)	(Russia) UNICS Kazan
2010–11		F	(France) Tariq Kirksay	(Spain) Sevilla	(Azerbaijan) Nik Caner-Medley	(Spain) Estudiantes
2010–11		C	(Poland) Maciej Lampe	(Russia) UNICS Kazan	(United States) Paul Davis	(Spain) Sevilla
2011–12		G	(United States) Patrick Beverley	(Russia) Spartak St. Petersburg	(Israel) Yotam Halperin	(Russia) Spartak St. Petersburg
2011–12		G	(Lithuania) Renaldas Seibutis	(Lithuania) Lietuvos Rytas	(United States) Ramel Curry	(Ukraine) Donetsk
2011–12		F	(Croatia) Zoran Planinić	(Russia) Khimki	(Czech Republic) Pavel Pumprla	(Czech Republic) ČEZ Nymburk
2011–12		F	(Azerbaijan) Nik Caner-Medley (2)	(Spain) Valencia	(North Macedonia) Jeremiah Massey	(Russia) Lokomotiv Kuban
2011–12		C	(Lithuania) Jonas Valančiūnas	(Lithuania) Lietuvos Rytas	(Montenegro) Bojan Dubljević	(Montenegro) Budućnost
2012–13		G	(United States) Malcolm Delaney	(Ukraine) Budivelnyk	(United States Virgin Islands) Walter Hodge	(Poland) Zielona Góra
2012–13		G	(Greece) Nick Calathes	(Russia) Lokomotiv Kuban	(United States) Chuck Eidson (2)	(Russia) UNICS Kazan
2012–13		F	(Greece) Kostas Vasileiadis	(Spain) Bilbao	(United States) Derrick Brown	(Russia) Lokomotiv Kuban
2012–13		F	(Kosovo) Justin Doellman	(Spain) Valencia	(United States) Lamont Hamilton	(Spain) Bilbao
2012–13		C	(United States) John Bryant	(Germany) Ratiopharm Ulm	(Greece) Loukas Mavrokefalidis	(Russia) Spartak St. Petersburg
2013–14		G	(Serbia) DeMarcus Nelson	(Serbia) Crvena Zvezda	(Israel) Yotam Halperin (2)	(Israel) Hapoel Jerusalem
2013–14		G	(United States) Drew Goudelock	(Russia) UNICS Kazan	(United States) Reggie Redding	(Germany) Alba Berlin
2013–14		F	(United States) Dijon Thompson (2)	(Russia) Nizhny Novgorod	(United States) Caleb Green	(Italy) Dinamo Sassari
2013–14		F	(Kosovo) Justin Doellman (2)	(Spain) Valencia	(Lithuania) Darjuš Lavrinovič	(Ukraine) Budivelnyk
2013–14		C	(Montenegro) Vladimir Golubović	(Turkey) TED Ankara Kolejliler	(Montenegro) Bojan Dubljević (2)	(Spain) Valencia
2014–15		G	(Montenegro) Tyrese Rice	(Russia) Khimki	(Turkey) Bobby Dixon	(Turkey) Karşıyaka
2014–15		G	(Finland) Petteri Koponen	(Russia) Khimki	(United States) Keith Langford	(Russia) UNICS Kazan
2014–15		F	(Dominican Republic) Sammy Mejía	(Turkey) Banvit	(Slovakia) Kyle Kuric	(Spain) Gran Canaria
2014–15		F	(United States) Derrick Brown (2)	(Russia) Lokomotiv Kuban	(Slovenia) Anthony Randolph	(Russia) Lokomotiv Kuban
2014–15		C	(Cape Verde) Walter Tavares	(Spain) Gran Canaria	(United States) Sharrod Ford	(France) Paris-Levallois
2015–16		G	(United States) Errick McCollum	(Turkey) Galatasaray	(Canada) Kevin Pangos	(Spain) Gran Canaria
2015–16		G	(United States) Mardy Collins	(France) Strasbourg IG	(United States) Victor Rudd	(Russia) Nizhny Novgorod
2015–16		F	(Serbia) Vladimir Micov	(Turkey) Galatasaray	(Poland) Mateusz Ponitka	(Poland) Zielona Góra
2015–16		F	(Italy) Davide Pascolo	(Italy) Aquila Trento	(United States) Julian Wright	(Italy) Aquila Trento
2015–16		C	(Slovenia) Alen Omić	(Spain) Gran Canaria	(Gabon) Stéphane Lasme	(Turkey) Galatasaray

=== All-EuroCup Team since addition of online fan voting ===
Player (X)	Denotes the number of times the player was selected to either the First or Second Team.

Season	Ref.	Pos.	All-EuroCup First Team		All-EuroCup Second Team	
Season	Ref.	Pos.	Player	Club	Player	Club
2016–17		G	(United States) Curtis Jerrells	(Israel) Hapoel Jerusalem	(United States) Kyle Fogg	(Spain) Unicaja Málaga
2016–17		G	(United States) Mardy Collins (2)	(Russia) Lokomotiv Kuban	(Slovakia) Kyle Kuric (2)	(Spain) Gran Canaria
2016–17		F	(Russia) Alexey Shved	(Russia) Khimki	(Spain) Fernando San Emeterio	(Spain) Valencia
2016–17		F	(Montenegro) Bojan Dubljević (3)	(Spain) Valencia	(Germany) Maxi Kleber	(Germany) Bayern Munich
2016–17		C	(Serbia) Dejan Musli	(Spain) Unicaja Málaga	(United States) Amar'e Stoudemire	(Israel) Hapoel Jerusalem
2017–18		G	(Spain) Quino Colom	(Russia) UNICS Kazan	(Montenegro) Nikola Ivanović	(Montenegro) Budućnost
2017–18		G	(Turkey) Scottie Wilbekin	(Turkey) Darüşşafaka	(Slovakia) Kyle Kuric (3)	(Russia) Zenit Saint Petersburg
2017–18		F	(Italy) Amedeo Della Valle	(Italy) Reggiana	(Russia) Dmitry Kulagin	(Russia) Lokomotiv Kuban
2017–18		F	(Australia) Ryan Broekhoff	(Russia) Lokomotiv Kuban	(United States) JaJuan Johnson	(Turkey) Darüşşafaka
2017–18		C	(United States) Devin Booker	(Germany) Bayern Munich	(Czech Republic) Ondřej Balvín	(Spain) Gran Canaria
2018–19		G	(France) Andrew Albicy	(Spain) MoraBanc Andorra	(United States) Pierria Henry	(Russia) UNICS Kazan
2018–19		G	(United States) Errick McCollum (2)	(Russia) UNICS Kazan	(Belgium) Sam Van Rossom	(Spain) Valencia
2018–19		F	(Lithuania) Rokas Giedraitis	(Germany) Alba Berlin	(Canada) Dylan Ennis	(Spain) MoraBanc Andorra
2018–19		F	(United States) Luke Sikma	(Germany) Alba Berlin	(France) Mathias Lessort	(Spain) Unicaja Málaga
2018–19		C	(Montenegro) Bojan Dubljević (4)	(Spain) Valencia	(Croatia) Miro Bilan	(France) ASVEL Villeurbanne
2020–21		G	(Serbia) Miloš Teodosić	(Italy) Virtus Segafredo Bologna	(Lithuania) Mantas Kalnietis	(Russia) Lokomotiv Kuban
2020–21		G	(United States) Jamar Smith	(Russia) UNICS Kazan	(Slovenia) Jaka Blažič	(Slovenia) Cedevita Olimpija
2020–21		F	(France) Isaïa Cordinier	(France) Nanterre 92	(United States) Anthony Brown	(France) Metropolitans 92
2020–21		F	(France) Mathias Lessort (2)	(France) Monaco	(United States) John Brown	(Russia) UNICS Kazan
2020–21		C	(United States) Willie Reed	(Montenegro) Budućnost VOLI	(United States) Vince Hunter	(Italy) Virtus Segafredo Bologna
2021–22		G	(Serbia) Miloš Teodosić (2)	(Italy) Virtus Segafredo Bologna	(United States) Kevin Punter	(Serbia) Partizan NIS Belgrade
2021–22		G	(United States) Will Cummings	(France) Metropolitans 92	(Slovenia) Jaka Blažič (2)	(Slovenia) Cedevita Olimpija
2021–22		G	(United States) Derek Needham	(Turkey) Frutti Extra Bursaspor	(United States) Semaj Christon	(Germany) ratiopharm Ulm
2021–22		F	(United States) Jaron Blossomgame	(Germany) ratiopharm Ulm	(United States) Caleb Homesley	(Germany) Hamburg Towers
2021–22		C	(France) Mam Jaiteh	(Italy) Virtus Segafredo Bologna	(Montenegro) Bojan Dubljević (5)	(Spain) Valencia Basket
2022–23		G	(United States) Jerian Grant	(Turkey) Türk Telekom	(United States) J'Covan Brown	(Israel) Hapoel Tel Aviv
2022–23		F	(United States) D. J. Stephens	(Ukraine) Prometey	(Turkey) Onuralp Bitim	(Turkey) Frutti Extra Bursaspor
2022–23		F	(France) Axel Bouteille	(Turkey) Türk Telekom	(United States) Sam Dekker	(United Kingdom) London Lions
2022–23		F	(United States) John Shurna	(Spain) Gran Canaria	(Brazil) Bruno Caboclo	(Germany) ratiopharm Ulm
2022–23		C	(Croatia) Ante Tomić	(Spain) Joventut	(United States) Tyrique Jones	(Turkey) Türk Telekom
2023–24		G	(North Macedonia) T. J. Shorts	(France) Paris Basketball	(Dominican Republic) Andrés Feliz	(Spain) Joventut
2023–24		G	(United States) Matt Morgan	(United Kingdom) London Lions	(United States) Patrick Richard	(Romania) U-BT Cluj-Napoca
2023–24		F	(Canada) Isiaha Mike	(France) JL Bourg	(France) Nadir Hifi	(France) Paris Basketball
2023–24		F	(United States) Trevion Williams	(Germany) Ratiopharm Ulm	(Lithuania) Deividas Sirvydis	(Lithuania) Lietkabelis
2023–24		C	(United Kingdom) Gabriel Olaseni	(United Kingdom) London Lions	(Romania) Emanuel Cățe	(Romania) U-BT Cluj-Napoca
2024–25		G	(United States) Jared Harper	(Israel) Hapoel Jerusalem	(United States) Zavier Simpson	(Romania) U-BT Cluj-Napoca
2024–25		G	(Dominican Republic) Jean Montero	(Spain) Valencia	(United States) Anthony Brown (2)	(Turkey) Türk Telekom
2024–25		F	(Croatia) Jaleen Smith	(Turkey) Bahçeşehir Koleji	(Spain) Xabier López-Arostegui	(Spain) Valencia
2024–25		F	(United States) Johnathan Motley	(Israel) Hapoel Tel Aviv	(United States) Semi Ojeleye	(Spain) Valencia
2024–25		C	(Canada) Mfiondu Kabengele	(Italy) Reyer Venezia	(United States) Devin Robinson	(Slovenia) Cedevita Olimpija
2025–26		G	(United States) Jared Harper	(Israel) Hapoel Jerusalem	(United States) Darius McGhee	(France) Cosea JL Bourg
2025–26		G	(United States) DeVante' Jones	(Italy) Dolomiti Energia Trento	(Romania) Fatts Russell	(Romania) U-BT Cluj-Napoca
2025–26		G	(Turkey) Malachi Flynn	(Turkey) Bahçeşehir Koleji	(United States) Anthony Brown (3)	(Turkey) Beşiktaş Gain
2025–26		F	(Montenegro) Kyle Allman	(Turkey) Türk Telekom	(South Sudan) Both Gach	(France) Cosea JL Bourg
2025–26		C	(Croatia) Ante Žižić	(Turkey) Beşiktaş Gain	(Australia) Mitch Creek	(Romania) U-BT Cluj-Napoca

== See also ==
- EuroCup awards
- EuroCup MVP
- EuroCup Finals MVP
- All-EuroLeague Team
- EuroLeague awards
- EuroLeague MVP
- EuroLeague Final Four MVP
