= EuroCup Basketball Top Scorer =

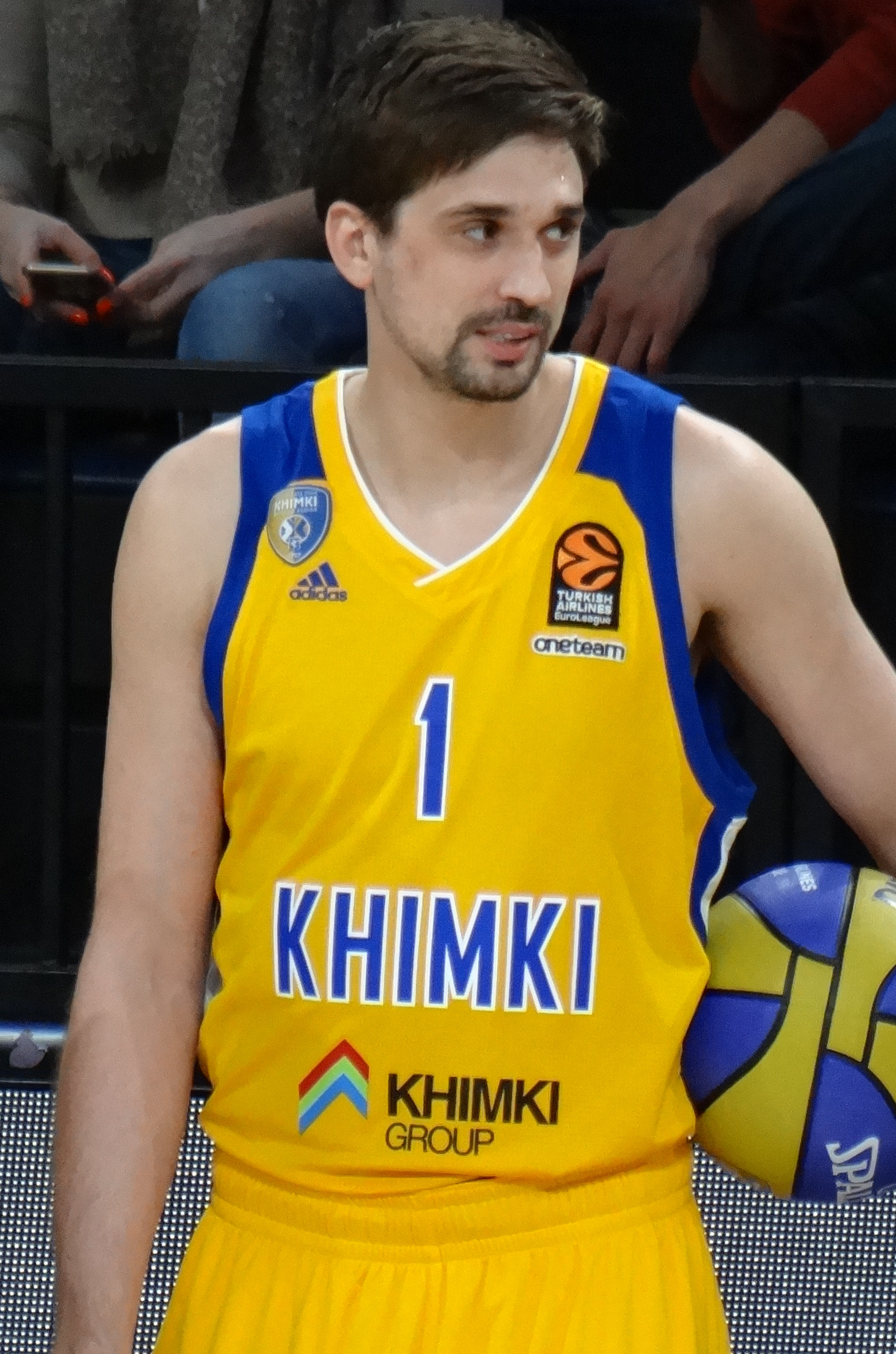
Alexey Shved was the EuroCup Top scorer in 2018.

The EuroCup Basketball Top Scorer, also known as the EuroCup Basketball Best Scorer, is the annual award that is given to the professional club basketball league EuroCup's Top scorer throughout the EuroCup season. The EuroCup is the European-wide 2nd-tier level league. It is the European-wide league that is one tier level below the European top-tier level EuroLeague.

== EuroCup Basketball Top Scorers ==
Season	Position	Top scorer	Team	PPG	Ref.
2002–03	PF	(United States) (Israel) Jamie Arnold	(Slovenia) Krka Novo Mesto	20.3	
2003–04	SG	(United States) Rasheed Brokenborough	(Austria) Kapfenberg Bulls	26.6	
2004–05	SG/SF	(Bulgaria) Todor Stoykov	(Bulgaria) Academic Sofia	23.9	
2005–06	PG	(United States) Horace Jenkins	(Israel) Hapoel Jerusalem	20.4	
2006–07	SF	(Serbia) (Greece) Milan Gurović	(Serbia) Red Star Belgrade	25.9	
2007–08	SG	(United States) (Austria) De'Teri Mayes	(Austria) Swans Gmunden	21.1	
2008–09	PG	(United States) Khalid El-Amin	(Ukraine) Azovmash Mariupol	17.9	
2009–10	PG/SG	(United States) (North Macedonia) Darius Washington	(Turkey) Galatasaray Istanbul	21.6	
2010–11	SG	(United States) (Azerbaijan) Jaycee Carroll	(Spain) Gran Canaria Las Palmas	19.0	
2011–12	SG	(United States) Ramel Curry	(Ukraine) Donetsk	16.4	
2012–13	PG	(United States Virgin Islands) (Puerto Rico) Walter Hodge	(Poland) Zielona Góra	21.2	
2013–14	SG	(United States) Errick McCollum	(Greece) Panionios	20.2	
2014–15	PG/SG	(United States) Randy Culpepper	(Russia) Red October Volgograd	19.2	
2015–16	SG	(United States) Keith Langford	(Russia) UNICS Kazan	19.7	
2016–17	SG	(Russia) Alexey Shved	(Russia) Khimki Moscow	22.1	
2017–18	SG	(United States) (Bosnia and Herzegovina) Scottie Wilbekin	(Turkey) Darüşşafaka	19.7	
2018–19	PG	(United States) Peyton Siva	(Germany) Alba Berlin	15.2	
2019–20	PG/SG	(Serbia) Miloš Teodosić	(Italy) Segafredo Virtus Bologna	17.8	
2020–21	SG/SF	(Slovenia) Jaka Blažič	(Slovenia) Cedevita Olimpija	19.1	
2021–22	SG	(United States) Errick McCollum	(Russia) Lokomotiv Kuban	22.3	
2022–23	PG	(United States) Yogi Ferrell	(Slovenia) Cedevita Olimpija	18.4	
2023–24	SG/SF	(Lithuania) Deividas Sirvydis	(Lithuania) Lietkabelis	18.9	
2024–25	PG	(United States) Jared Harper	(Israel) Hapoel Jerusalem	22.8	
2025–26	PG	(Romanian Basketball Federation) Daron Russell	(Romanian Basketball Federation) U-BT Cluj-Napoca	19.8	
