= Adam Mokoka =

French basketball player (born 1998)

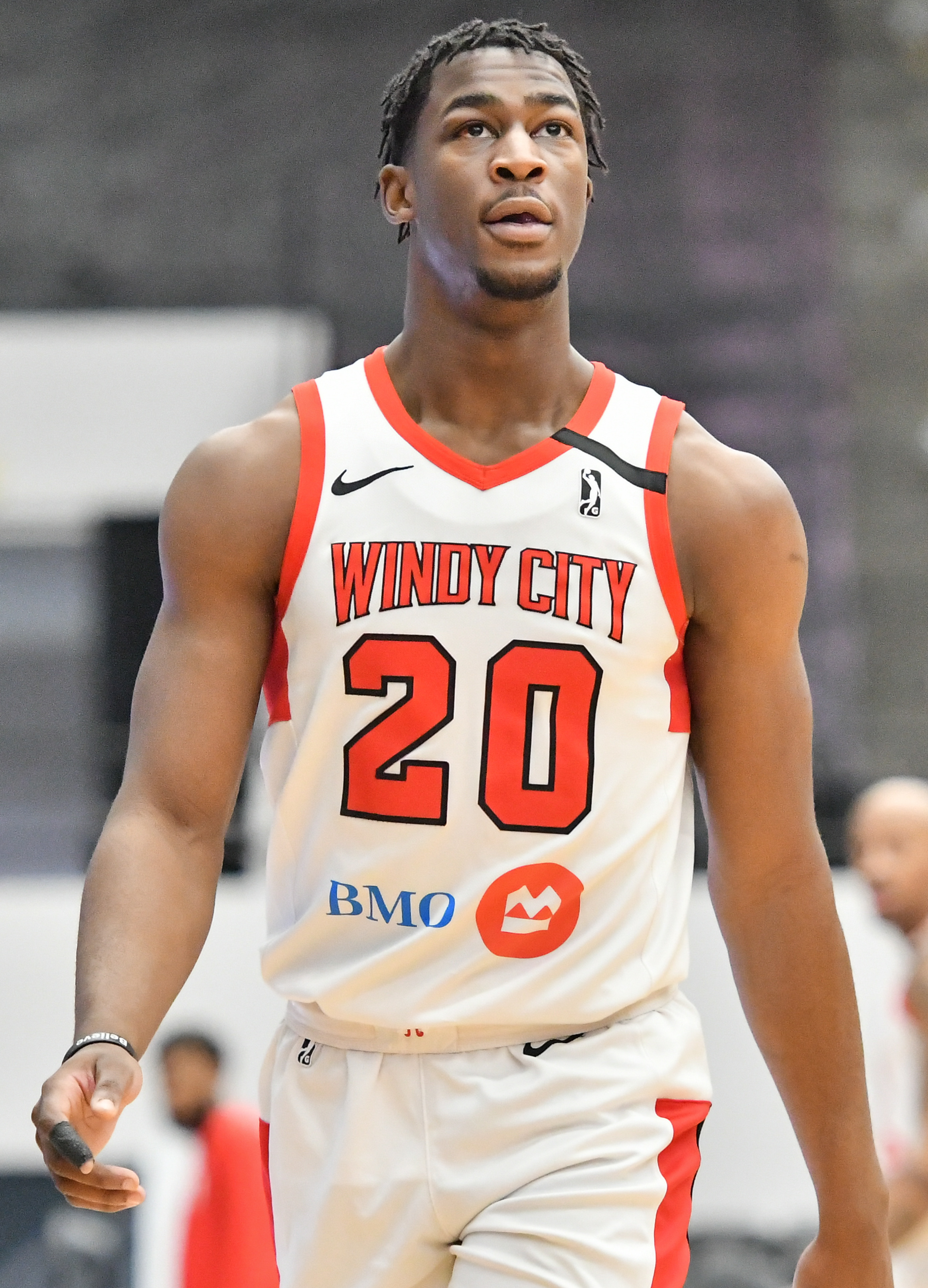
- Mokoka with the Windy City Bulls in 2020

No. 95 – Aris Thessaloniki
- Position: Shooting guard / small forward
- League: GBL; EuroCup

Personal information
- Born: 18 July 1998 (age 28) Paris, France
- Listed height: 6 ft 5 in (1.96 m)
- Listed weight: 190 lb (86 kg)

Career information
- NBA draft: 2019: undrafted
- Playing career: 2015–present

Career history
- 2015–2018: BCM Gravelines-Dunkerque
- 2018–2019: Mega
- 2019–2021: Chicago Bulls
- 2019–2020: →Windy City Bulls
- 2021: →Austin Spurs
- 2021–2022: Nanterre 92
- 2022–2023: Oklahoma City Blue
- 2023: Reyer Venezia
- 2023–2025: U-BT Cluj-Napoca
- 2025–2026: JL Bourg
- 2026–present: Aris Thessaloniki

Career highlights
- EuroCup champion (2026); EuroCup Finals MVP (2026); All-LNB Élite Second Team (2026); Romanian League champion (2024, 2025); Romanian Cup winner (2024); LNB Élite Best Young Player (2018)
- Stats at NBA.com
- Stats at Basketball Reference
Medals
Men's basketball
Representing France
FIBA Europe Under-18 Championship
Gold medal – first place	2016 Turkey	U-18 Team
FIBA Europe Under-16 Championship
Gold medal – first place	2014 Latvia	U-16 Team

Adam Mokoka (born 18 July 1998) is a French professional basketball player for Aris Thessaloniki of the Greek Basketball League (GBL) and the EuroCup. He primarily plays at the shooting guard position.

== Early career ==
Mokoka came through the youth academy of BCM Gravelines-Dunkerque. He won the national U21 championship with the BCM in 2014 and 2015.

== Professional career ==
=== BCM Gravelines-Dunkerque (2015–2018) ===
Mokoka made his debut for BCM's men's squad in the French top-flight Pro A during the 2015–16 season. In April 2018, he declared for the 2018 NBA draft. In May 2018, we was named the LNB Pro A Best Young Player, after averaging 3.2 points and 1.7 rebounds over the 2017–18 season.

=== Mega Bemax (2018–2019) ===
On 10 July 2018, Mokoka signed with Serbian club Mega Bemax.

On 12 June 2018, Mokoka withdrew from the 2018 NBA draft on the deadline, rather focusing on the 2019 NBA draft where he (at that time) was considered a second-round draft prospect. In April 2019, he declared for the 2019 draft, but went undrafted.

=== Chicago Bulls (2019–2021) ===
On 2 July 2019, Mokoka signed with the Chicago Bulls to a two-way contract. He moved to the Austin Spurs as a two-way flex-transfer on 27 February 2021.

=== Nanterre 92 (2021–2022) ===
On 25 November 2021, Mokoka was signed by Nanterre 92, thus returning to the French league.

On 12 October 2022, Mokoka was signed by the Oklahoma City Thunder and waived three days later.

=== Oklahoma City Blue (2022–2023) ===
On 3 November 2022, Mokoka was named to the opening night roster for the Oklahoma City Blue.

=== Reyer Venezia (2023) ===
On 31 March 2023 Mokoka signed with Reyer Venezia of the Italian Lega Basket Serie A (LBA).

=== U-BT Cluj-Napoca (2023–2025) ===
On 21 September 2023 he inked a deal with U-BT Cluj-Napoca of the Romanian Liga Națională and the EuroCup. He played in Romania for two seasons, helping his team win two Romanian League titles, a Romanian Cup, and reach the EuroCup quarterfinals twice in a row. Mokoka appeared in 110 games for Cluj, including 70 in the Liga Națională de Baschet, 37 in the EuroCup, and 3 in the Romanian Cup.

=== JL Bourg (2025–2026) ===
On June 15, 2025, he signed with JL Bourg of the LNB Pro A.

=== Aris (2026–present) ===
On August 7, 2026, Mokoka signed a two-year contract with Aris Thessaloniki of the Greek Basketball League (GBL) and the EuroCup.

== National team career ==
Mokoka was a member of gold-winning French teams at the 2014 U16 and 2016 U18 European Championships. He competed for France in the 2017 FIBA Under-19 Basketball World Cup, averaging 6.4 points a contest.

== Career statistics ==
Legend
GP	Games played	GS	Games started	MPG	Minutes per game
FG%	Field goal percentage	3P%	3-point field goal percentage	FT%	Free throw percentage
RPG	Rebounds per game	APG	Assists per game	SPG	Steals per game
BPG	Blocks per game	PPG	Points per game	**Bold**	Career high

=== NBA ===
Year	Team	GP	GS	MPG	FG%	3P%	FT%	RPG	APG	SPG	BPG	PPG
2019–20	Chicago	11	0	**10.2**	**.429**	**.400**	**.500**	**.9**	**.4**	**.4**	.0	**2.9**
2020–21	Chicago	**14**	0	4.0	.368	.100	.000	.4	**.4**	.1	**.1**	1.1
Career		25	0	6.7	.404	.280	.400	.6	.4	.2	.0	1.9

=== LNB Pro A ===
Year	Team	GP	GS	MPG	FG%	3P%	FT%	RPG	APG	SPG	BPG	PPG
2015–16	BCM Gravelines-Dunkerque	1	0	1.0	.000	.000	.000	0.0	0.0	0.0	0.0	0.0
2016–17	BCM Gravelines-Dunkerque	12	0	6.8	**.368**	.125	**.667**	0.3	0.2	0.2	0.0	1.4
2017–18	BCM Gravelines-Dunkerque	**34**	**22**	**14.0**	.345	**.222**	.553	**1.7**	**0.9**	**0.4**	**0.1**	**3.2**
Career		47	22	7.3	.357	.174	.610	1.0	0.6	0.3	0.1	2.3
