= Fatts Russell =

American-Romanian basketball player (born 1998)

- Russell with Anadolu Efes in 2026

No. 11 – Anadolu Efes
- Position: Point guard
- League: BSL; EuroLeague

Personal information
- Born: May 6, 1998 (age 28) Philadelphia, Pennsylvania, U.S.
- Listed height: 5 ft 11 in (1.80 m)
- Listed weight: 165 lb (75 kg)

Career information
- High school: Imhotep Charter (Philadelphia, Pennsylvania)
- College: Rhode Island (2017–2021); Maryland (2021–2022)
- NBA draft: 2022: undrafted
- Playing career: 2022–present

Career history
- 2022–2023: Mornar
- 2023: Galatasaray
- 2023–2024: Glint Manisa
- 2024–2025: Karşıyaka Basket
- 2025: New Taipei CTBC DEA
- 2025–2026: U-BT Cluj-Napoca
- 2026–present: Anadolu Efes

Career highlights
- All-EuroCup Second Team (2026); EuroCup Top Scorer (2026); ABA League assists leader (2026); VTB United League Supercup winner (2026); Romanian League champion (2026); Romanian Cup winner (2026); Romanian League Finals MVP (2026); First-team All-Atlantic 10 (2020); Third-team All-Atlantic 10 (2021); Atlantic 10 All-Defensive Team (2020)

Daron "Fatts" Russell (born May 6, 1998) is an American-Romanian professional basketball player for Anadolu Efes of the Basketbol Süper Ligi (BSL) and the EuroLeague. He played college basketball for four years for Rhode Island, and after graduating he played one season for the Maryland Terrapins.

== Early life and high school career ==
Russell grew up in Philadelphia, Pennsylvania, and looked up to basketball player Kobe Bryant, who was born in the same city. His mother gave him the nickname "Fatts," which he has been called his entire life, because he was chubby as a baby. Russell played for Imhotep Institute Charter High School in Philadelphia, where he was coached by Andre Noble. Russell became its all-time leader in points, assists and steals. As a senior, he led his team, which was considered one of the best in the country, to a 31–2 record and the Pennsylvania Interscholastic Athletic Association (PIAA) 4A state championship, scoring 25 points in the title game. Russell was named Philadelphia Public League and Pennsylvania Class 4A most valuable player (MVP). He was a consensus three-star recruit and committed to play collegiately for Rhode Island over offers from Seton Hall, SMU and Western Kentucky, among others.

== College career ==
On December 4, 2017, Russell was named Atlantic 10 freshman of the week after scoring 20 points in wins over Brown and Providence. As a freshman, Russell averaged 7.0 points per game. In the NCAA Tournament, he scored 15 points including two clinching free throws with 11 seconds remaining and had five assists and two steals in a 83–78 overtime win against Oklahoma. Russell scored a career-high 41 points on March 5, 2019, in a 86–85 overtime win against St. Joseph's. It was the highest scoring effort by a Rhode Island player in a road game. Russell finished his sophomore season averaging 14.2 points and 3.7 assists per game.

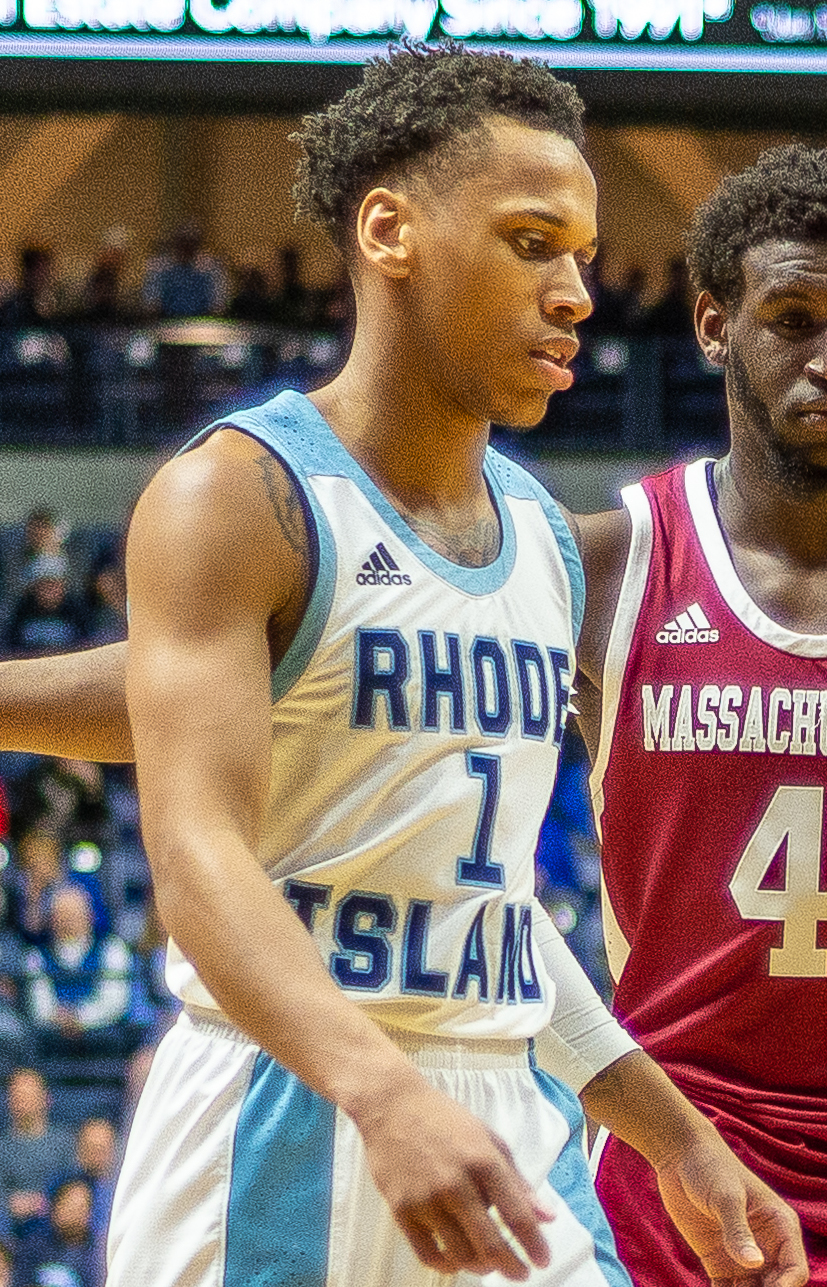
Russell with Rhode Island in 2020

On January 15, 2020, Russell scored 25 points against St. Joseph's and surpassed the 1,000 point threshold. He scored 30 points on January 30, in a 87–75 win over VCU. On February 13, Russell was named to the midseason watch list for the Naismith Trophy. At the close of the regular season, Russell was named to the First Team All-Atlantic 10 and the Defensive Team. He was named the U.S. Basketball Writer's Association District I Player of the Year and was selected to the National Association of Basketball Coaches 2019–20 Division I All-District 4 First Team. Russell averaged 18.8 points and 2.9 steals per game, second in Division I. Following the season, he declared for the 2020 NBA draft but intended to keep his college eligibility. On February 16, 2021, in a game against Dayton, Russell became Rhode Island's all-time leader in steals. As a senior, he averaged 14.7 points, 4.5 rebounds and 4.5 assists per game, earning Third Team All-Atlantic 10 honors. After the season, Russell transferred to Maryland.

On February 27, 2022, Russell scored a career-high 27 points and surpassed the 2,000 point mark in a 75–60 win over Ohio State. He was named Honorable Mention All-Big Ten, after averaging 15.1 points, 4.1 rebounds, 3.7 assists, and 1.3 steals per game.

== Professional career ==
=== Mornar (2022–2023) ===
On July 7, 2022, Russell signed with Mornar of the ABA League and the Montenegrin League. On October 1, Russell made his professional debut, scoring 41 points on 14-of-29 shooting, leading his team to a 91–83 win over Igokea in the first round of the 2022–23 ABA League. He also added six rebounds and six assists for a PIR of 39. In the second round on October 9, he broke the league's all-time record for points scored in a single game by recording 47 points, four rebounds, four assists and four steals (48 PIR) in a 100–91 victory over KK Zadar. In 15 ABA League games with Mornar, he averaged 26.8 points, 7.3 assists and 1.5 steals per game, leading the league in scoring and assists.

=== Galatasaray Nef (2023) ===
On January 21, 2023, he signed with Galatasaray Nef of the Basketbol Süper Ligi (BSL) and the Basketball Champions League (BCL). On January 23, he made his debut in the BCL, coming off the bench to score 20 points in a 100–73 victory over Limoges CSP. Russell appeared in 17 games throughout the 2022–23 BSL season, in which he averaged 13.1 points, 5.1 assists and 1.4 steals per contest, helping the team reach the quarterfinals.

=== Manisa BB (2023–2024) ===
On June 21, 2023, he signed with Manisa BB of the Turkish Basketbol Süper Ligi.

=== Karşıyaka Basket (2024–2025) ===
On June 28, 2024, he signed with Karşıyaka Basket of the Basketbol Süper Ligi (BSL).

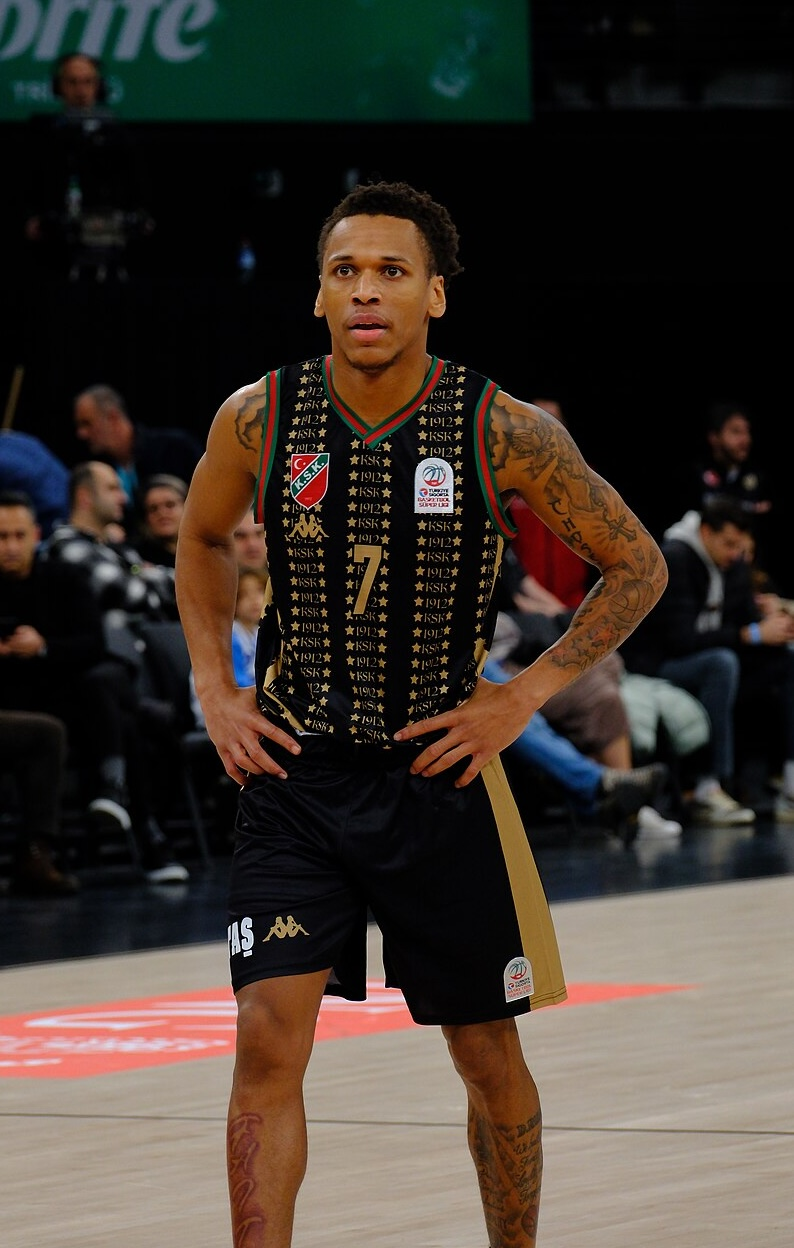
Russell with Karşıyaka in 2024

=== New Taipei CTBC DEA (2025) ===
On February 25, 2025, Russell signed with the New Taipei CTBC DEA of the Taiwan Professional Basketball League (TPBL).

=== U-BT Cluj-Napoca (2025–2026) ===
On July 25, 2025, Russell signed with U-BT Cluj-Napoca of the Romanian Liga Națională (LNBM), the ABA League and the EuroCup.

=== Anadolu Efes (2026–present) ===
On August 14, 2026, Russell signed with Anadolu Efes of the Turkish Basketbol Süper Ligi (BSL) and the EuroLeague.

== National team career ==
In October 2025, Russell obtained Romanian citizenship. Russell represented Romania in the FIBA Basketball World Cup 2027 European Qualifiers.

== Career statistics ==
Legend
GP	Games played	GS	Games started	MPG	Minutes per game
FG%	Field goal percentage	3P%	3-point field goal percentage	FT%	Free throw percentage
RPG	Rebounds per game	APG	Assists per game	SPG	Steals per game
BPG	Blocks per game	PPG	Points per game	**Bold**	Career high

=== College ===
Year	Team	GP	GS	MPG	FG%	3P%	FT%	RPG	APG	SPG	BPG	PPG
2017–18	Rhode Island	**34**	0	17.9	.352	.298	.810	1.6	1.6	.8	.0	7.0
2018–19	Rhode Island	32	**32**	34.1	.338	.223	.737	2.7	3.7	1.8	**.3**	14.2
2019–20	Rhode Island	30	29	**35.7**	**.388**	**.357**	**.824**	3.4	**4.6**	**2.9**	.2	**18.8**
2020–21	Rhode Island	23	22	33.2	.337	.235	.799	**4.5**	4.5	1.9	.1	14.7
Career		119	83	29.7	.356	.281	.790	2.9	3.5	1.8	.2	13.4

== Personal life ==
Russell's older brother DeWayne played college basketball for Grand Canyon before playing professionally overseas.
