= Tyner Academy =

Secondary school in Tennessee, United States

Coordinates: 35.0612°N 85.1542°W

Tyner Middle High Academy
- Chattanooga, Tennessee; United States

Information
- Established: 1907
- Principal: Rashaad Williams
- Grades: 9–12
- Colors: Maroon, gold and white
- Team name: Rams
- Website: https://tyner.hcde.org/

Tyner Middle High Academy is located in Chattanooga, Tennessee, United States. It was built in 1907 as the first secondary school in Hamilton County east of the Missionary Ridge at the site of the current Tyner Middle Academy. The first class consisted of 25 students. The school was moved to the current location, which has had many additions and changes since 1937. Today Tyner Academy serves around 876 students, in grades 6–12, in three Career Academies and a Freshman Academy. They moved to a brand new $90 million building in March of 2025.

The school colors are maroon and gold and the school mascot is the Ram.

== Current administration and faculty ==
The school is currently governed by Principal Rashaad Williams, as well as Assistant Principals Ron Davis, Amy Myhan, Tasha Flowers, and Katrich Hale. There are 29 full-time teachers at the school.

== Academies ==
Each student at Tyner Academy belongs to one of four Future Ready Institutes. All freshmen are a part of the Freshman Academy. During their first year, students learn about the four institutes: Teaching as a Profession, Early Childhood Education, Health Sciences, and EPB. Then, they are allowed to decide which they would like to belong to for their remaining three years. The purpose of the Career Academies is to prepare students for jobs in these fields.

== Athletics ==
Tyner Academy's sports teams include:

- Football: Coach Mainor
- Baseball: Coach Frias
- Boys' basketball: Coach Ward
- Girls' basketball: Coach Marshall
- Cheerleading: Coach Spivey
- Cross Country: Coach Ward and Coach Marshall
- Marching band: Ms. Wolugbums
- Boys' Soccer:
- Softball: Coach Wright
- Boys' track
- Girls' track
- Volleyball: Coach Bryant
- Wrestling : Coach Mainor

== Demographics and statistics ==
Of the 575 students attending Tyner Academy, 52% are male and 48% are female. 96% are minorities. The student to teacher ratio is 13:1.

== Milestones ==
Over the past 100 years, Tyner Academy has achieved many milestones under its 13 principals.

- September 9, 1907 – first day of school at Tyner Baptist Church, as the school building wasn't ready
- November 26, 1907 – dedication of the school
- 1922 – Running water
- 1924 – Electric lights
- 1926 – Cafeteria added
- 1931 – First choral and instrumental programs
- 1937 – New building with classrooms, cafeteria, gymnasium, library and offices
- 1942 – First yearbook, Talley Ho
- 1946 — Tyner Memorial Field dedicated (inaugurating night football)
- 1955 – Ram became the official school mascot
- 1958 – Ninth grade moved to the middle school
- 1962 – Auditorium and annex added
- 1967 – New football stadium constructed
- 1974 – Annexed into city limits of Chattanooga and became part of Chattanooga City Schools
- 1975 – New gymnasium built
- 1981 – New vocational building constructed
- 1984 – Montice B. Howard Library dedicated
- 1986 – New cafeteria and science labs built
- 1989 – Ninth grade returned
- 1998 – Became part of Hamilton County Schools when Chattanooga City Schools was merged with the county school system
- 1999 – Renamed Tyner Academy of Math, Science, and Technology
- 1999 – First lottery students from magnet grant and science labs upgraded
- 2004 – Second magnet grant awarded, implemented Career Academies
- 2007 – 100-year anniversary
- 2022 – Original building deconstructed for new Middle/High school.
- 2025 - New building constructed on the other side of the street.
