= Malachi Flynn =

American basketball player (born 1998)

- Flynn with Bahçeşehir Koleji in 2026

No. 22 – Bahçeşehir Koleji
- Position: Point guard
- League: Basketbol Süper Ligi

Personal information
- Born: May 9, 1998 (age 28) Tacoma, Washington, U.S.
- Listed height: 6 ft 1 in (1.85 m)
- Listed weight: 185 lb (84 kg)

Career information
- High school: Bellarmine Prep (Tacoma, Washington)
- College: Washington State (2016–2018); San Diego State (2019–2020)
- NBA draft: 2020: 1st round, 29th overall pick
- Drafted by: Toronto Raptors
- Playing career: 2020–present

Career history
- 2020–2023: Toronto Raptors
- 2020–2022: →Raptors 905
- 2023–2024: New York Knicks
- 2024: Detroit Pistons
- 2024–2025: Austin Spurs
- 2025: Charlotte Hornets
- 2025–present: Bahçeşehir Koleji

Career highlights
- All-EuroCup First Team (2026); All-NBA G League First Team (2025); All-NBA G League Second Team (2021); NBA G League All-Rookie Team (2021); Consensus second-team All-American (2020); Mountain West Player of the Year (2020); First-team All-Mountain West (2020); Mountain West Defensive Player of the Year (2020)
- Stats at NBA.com
- Stats at Basketball Reference

Malachi Emmanuel Flynn (born May 9, 1998) (/ˈmæləkaɪ/) is an American-born naturalized Turkish professional basketball player for Bahçeşehir Koleji of the Turkish Basketbol Süper Ligi (BSL). He represents Turkey internationally. He played college basketball for the Washington State Cougars and the San Diego State Aztecs. He was selected 29th by the Toronto Raptors in the first round of the 2020 NBA draft.

== High school career ==
Flynn is the youngest of seven children. He stood 5'2 during his freshman season in high school, then grew to 5'6 as a sophomore before a growth spurt took him to his current height of 6'1. As a senior at Bellarmine Prep, Flynn averaged 29.7 points, 6.0 rebounds and 4.0 assists per game, while shooting 48 percent from the floor. He earned a host of accolades, including The News Tribune's All-Area player of the year, Associated Press Washington player of the year, the Class 4A player of the year by the Washington Interscholastic Basketball Coaches Association, and the 4A Narrows League MVP as a senior. His 743 points as a senior set the single-season mark at Bellarmine Prep, and he finished with 1,625 career points, second only to Abdul Gaddy. Flynn originally committed to Pacific before reopening his recruitment late in the signing period. He signed with the Washington State Cougars on April 13, 2016.

== College career ==
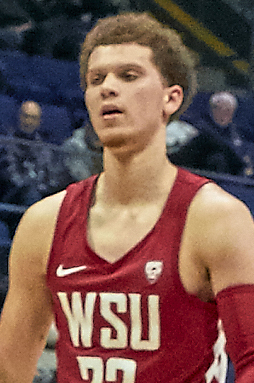
Flynn with Washington State in 2018

In November 2016, Flynn scored 27 points in an 83–76 victory over Utah Valley, which is sixth most for a Cougar freshman in history. As a freshman at Washington State, he averaged 9.7 points per game and shot 38.7 percent from three-point range. Flynn averaged 15.8 points and 4.3 assists per game while shooting 41.3 percent from the field as a sophomore. He was the top player on a team that finished 12–19. Following the season, Flynn announced he was transferring. After receiving interest from Gonzaga, Texas A&M, Baylor and Creighton, Flynn signed with San Diego State in May 2018.

Coming into his redshirt junior season, Flynn was named the preseason Mountain West player of the year by Mountain West Wire. In a game in which he otherwise shot poorly, Flynn hit a last-second three-point shot on December 8 to defeat San Jose State 59–57. He was named to the midseason watchlist for the Wooden Award. On February 29, 2020, Flynn scored a career-high 36 points, the most by any Aztec since 2005, shooting 13-of-20 from the floor in an 83–76 comeback win over Nevada. At the conclusion of the regular season, Flynn was named Mountain West Player of the Year and Defensive Player of the Year. He averaged 17.6 points, 5.1 assists, and 4.5 rebounds per game. Following the season, Flynn declared for the 2020 NBA draft.

== Professional career ==
=== Toronto Raptors (2020–2023) ===
Flynn was selected with the 29th pick in the first round of the 2020 NBA draft by the Toronto Raptors, the first San Diego State player to be drafted in the first round since Kawhi Leonard in 2011. He made his debut for the Raptors on December 23, 2020, playing one minute against the New Orleans Pelicans. On February 3, 2021, Flynn was assigned to the Raptors' NBA G League affiliate, the Raptors 905. On February 18, 2021, Flynn was recalled from his NBA G League assignment. On April 10, 2021, Flynn scored a then career-high 20 points and dished out a career-high 11 assists with two rebounds and steals in a 135–115 win against the Cleveland Cavaliers. On April 14, 2021, Flynn scored a then career-high 22 points with five rebounds, three assists and two steals in a 103–108 loss against the Atlanta Hawks. On May 4, 2021, Flynn was named Eastern Conference Rookie of the Month for April 2021.

On March 4, 2022, Flynn scored a season-high 20 points, alongside three rebounds and eight assists, in a 97–103 loss to the Orlando Magic.

=== New York Knicks (2023–2024) ===
On December 30, 2023, Flynn, along with O.G. Anunoby and Precious Achiuwa, were traded to the New York Knicks in exchange for RJ Barrett, Immanuel Quickley and a second-round pick.

=== Detroit Pistons (2024) ===
On February 8, 2024, Flynn, Ryan Arcidiacono, Evan Fournier, Quentin Grimes and two second-round picks were traded to the Detroit Pistons in exchange for Bojan Bogdanović and Alec Burks.

On April 3, Flynn scored a career-high 50 points against the Atlanta Hawks, tying him with Nick Anderson for the second-highest amount of points scored by a player coming off the bench in NBA history, behind Jamal Crawford. Additionally, he became the player with the lowest career scoring average with 5.2 to score 50 points in an NBA game, a record previously set by Terrence Ross, who averaged 7.4 points per game at the time.

=== Austin Spurs (2024–2025) ===
On August 7, 2024, Flynn signed with the San Antonio Spurs, but was waived on October 19. On October 29, he joined the Austin Spurs.

=== Charlotte Hornets (2025) ===
On February 28, 2025, Flynn signed a 10-day contract with the Charlotte Hornets. Flynn made four appearances for the Hornets, recording averages of 4.0 points, 1.8 rebounds, and 1.8 assists.

=== Bahçeşehir Koleji (2025–present) ===
On June 1, 2025, Flynn signed with Bahçeşehir Koleji of the Basketbol Süper Ligi (BSL). On November 5, Flynn received a Hoops Agents Player of the Week Award for Round 6. He had the game-high 36 points, 4 rebounds, and 5 assists for his team's victory. In the regular season of the 2025-26 EuroCup Flynn led Bahçeşehir in points (17.8), assists (4.0), steals (1.7) per game and PIR (18.9).

On June 16, 2026, Flynn re–signed with the team on a one–year contract.

== National team career ==
Flynn with the Turkey national team in 2026

On January 29, 2026, Flynn received Turkish citizenship and became eligible to play for the senior Turkish national team. On July 6, 2026, he made his debut for Turkey in a 2027 FIBA World Cup qualification game against Switzerland, recording eight points and four assists.

== Career statistics ==
Legend
GP	Games played	GS	Games started	MPG	Minutes per game
FG%	Field goal percentage	3P%	3-point field goal percentage	FT%	Free throw percentage
RPG	Rebounds per game	APG	Assists per game	SPG	Steals per game
BPG	Blocks per game	PPG	Points per game	**Bold**	Career high

=== NBA ===
==== Regular season ====
Year	Team	GP	GS	MPG	FG%	3P%	FT%	RPG	APG	SPG	BPG	PPG
2020–21	Toronto	47	**14**	**19.7**	.374	.321	.804	**2.5**	**2.9**	**.8**	.1	7.5
2021–22	Toronto	44	5	12.2	.393	.333	.625	1.4	1.6	.5	.1	4.3
2022–23	Toronto	**53**	2	13.0	.360	**.353**	.758	1.4	1.3	.4	.1	4.6
2023–24	Toronto	31	0	15.3	.409	.350	.773	2.1	2.4	.6	**.2**	5.1
2023–24	New York	14	0	4.3	.391	.308	.818	.4	.4	.1	.0	2.2
2023–24	Detroit	24	0	14.3	**.430**	.316	.684	1.8	2.1	**.8**	.1	**8.0**
2024–25	Charlotte	4	0	10.9	.385	.250	**.833**	1.8	1.8	**.8**	.0	4.0
Career		217	21	14.2	.387	.333	.747	1.7	1.9	.6	.1	5.5

==== Playoffs ====
Year	Team	GP	GS	MPG	FG%	3P%	FT%	RPG	APG	SPG	BPG	PPG
2022	Toronto	6	0	6.0	.000	.000	—	.5	.5	.2	.0	.0
Career		6	0	6.0	.000	.000	—	.5	.5	.2	.0	.0

=== College ===
Year	Team	GP	GS	MPG	FG%	3P%	FT%	RPG	APG	SPG	BPG	PPG
2016–17	Washington State	31	30	33.1	.395	**.387**	.735	2.9	2.9	.7	.0	9.7
2017–18	Washington State	31	30	**33.4**	.413	.338	.846	3.4	4.3	1.6	**.1**	15.8
2018–19	San Diego State	Redshirt										
2019–20	San Diego State	**32**	**32**	**33.4**	**.441**	.373	**.857**	**4.5**	**5.1**	**1.8**	**.1**	**17.6**
Career		94	92	33.3	.420	.363	.833	3.6	4.1	1.3	.1	14.4
