= Anthony Brown (basketball) =

American basketball player (born 1992)

- Brown with Beşiktaş in 2026

No. 21 – Beşiktaş Fuzul
- Position: Small forward / shooting guard
- League: Basketbol Süper Ligi; EuroCup

Personal information
- Born: October 10, 1992 (age 34) Bellflower, California, U.S.
- Listed height: 6 ft 7 in (2.01 m)
- Listed weight: 224 lb (102 kg)

Career information
- High school: Ocean View (Huntington Beach, California)
- College: Stanford (2010–2015)
- NBA draft: 2015: 2nd round, 34th overall pick
- Drafted by: Los Angeles Lakers
- Playing career: 2015–present

Career history
- 2015–2016: Los Angeles Lakers
- 2015–2016: →Los Angeles D-Fenders
- 2016–2017: Erie BayHawks
- 2016: New Orleans Pelicans
- 2017: Orlando Magic
- 2017–2018: Minnesota Timberwolves
- 2017–2018: →Iowa Wolves
- 2018: Partizan
- 2019: Lakeland Magic
- 2019: Limoges CSP
- 2019–2020: Fuenlabrada
- 2020–2021: Metropolitans 92
- 2021–2022: Bursaspor
- 2022: Maccabi Rishon LeZion
- 2022–2023: UNICS Kazan
- 2023–2024: Bursaspor
- 2024–2025: Türk Telekom
- 2025–present: Beşiktaş

Career highlights
- 3× All-EuroCup Second Team (2021, 2025, 2026); NBA D-League All-Star (2017)
- Stats at NBA.com
- Stats at Basketball Reference

Anthony LeJohn Brown (born October 10, 1992) is an American professional basketball player for Beşiktaş of the Basketbol Süper Ligi (BSL) and the EuroCup. He played college basketball for the Stanford Cardinal.

== High school career ==
Brown attended Ocean View High School where he averaged 14.0 points and 6.0 rebounds per game as a junior, while being named league MVP. That year he led the Seahawks to a CIF Southern Section championship and state runner-up finish and was named CIF Southern Section Player of the Year and a member of the first-team all-state. His high school jersey was retired and he was inducted into the Hall of Fame. He was the No. 7-ranked small forward, No. 41 player overall and a four-star recruit by Scout.com.

== College career ==
Brown attended Stanford from 2010 to 2015. Brown had a medical redshirt in his true junior season of 2012–13 due to a hip injury. In his redshirt junior season of 2013–14, he averaged 12.3 points and 5.0 rebounds per game and shot 47.5% from the floor, 45.3% from beyond the arc and 78.5% on free throws. He was named the Pac-12's Most Improved Player as the Cardinal reached the Sweet 16 of the NCAA Tournament.

As a senior Brown led Stanford to the NIT championship while averaging 14.8 points (10th in the Pac-12), a team-high 6.9 rebounds (8th), and 2.5 assists per game. He had the eighth best free-throw percentage in the Pac-12, at 79.4 per cent. During his career he averaged 10.8 points, 4.8 rebounds and 1.6 assists per game.

Brown completed his bachelor's degree in communication in May 2014 and was enrolled in Stanford's Master of Arts program in media studies in his redshirt senior season.

== Professional career ==
=== Los Angeles Lakers (2015–2016) ===
On June 25, 2015, Brown was selected with the 34th overall pick in the 2015 NBA draft by the Los Angeles Lakers. On July 9, he signed with the Lakers. He made his debut for the Lakers on October 30, scoring five points off the bench in a loss to the Sacramento Kings. During his rookie season, he had multiple assignments to the Los Angeles D-Fenders, the Lakers' D-League affiliate. On October 24, 2016, he was waived by the Lakers.

=== Erie BayHawks and NBA stints (2016–2017) ===
On October 30, 2016, Brown was selected by the Erie BayHawks with the first overall pick in the 2016 NBA Development League Draft. After averaging 29.3 points, 4.3 rebounds and 4.3 assists in three games, Brown signed with the New Orleans Pelicans on November 21. On December 9, he was waived by the Pelicans. In nine games, he averaged 3.9 points and 2.5 rebounds in 15.9 minutes. Three days later, he returned to Erie.

On January 22, 2017, Brown signed a 10-day contract with the Orlando Magic. On February 2, 2017, after the 10-day contract expired, Brown returned to the BayHawks. Four days later, he was named in the Eastern Conference All-Star team for the 2017 NBA D-League All-Star Game.

=== Minnesota Timberwolves/Iowa Wolves (2017–2018) ===
On August 1, 2017, Brown was signed to a two-way contract by the Minnesota Timberwolves. Under the terms of the deal, he will split time between the Timberwolves and their G-League affiliate, the Iowa Wolves. He became the first player in franchise history to sign a two-way contract.

On August 29, 2018, Brown signed with the Philadelphia 76ers on a training camp contract. On October 10, 2018, Brown was waived by the 76ers.

=== Partizan (2018) ===
On October 23, 2018, Brown signed with Serbian club Partizan for the rest of the 2018–19 season. On November 27, 2018, he parted ways with Partizan.

=== Lakeland Magic (2019) ===
On January 10, 2019, the Lakeland Magic announced via their Twitter account that they had added Brown.

=== Limoges (2019) ===
On October 28, 2019, he signed with Limoges CSP of the LNB Pro A.

=== Montakit Fuenlabrada (2019–2020) ===
On December 30, 2019, he signed with Montakit Fuenlabrada of the Liga ACB.

=== Metropolitans 92 (2020–2021) ===
On July 6, 2020, he signed with Metropolitans 92 of LNB Pro A.

=== Frutti Extra Bursaspor (2021–2022) ===
On October 29, 2021, he signed with Frutti Extra Bursaspor of the Turkish Basketbol Süper Ligi (BSL).

=== Maccabi Rishon LeZion (2022) ===
On January 12, 2022, he signed with Maccabi Rishon LeZion in the Israeli Basketball Premier League.

=== BC UNICS (2022–2023) ===
On August 27, 2022, he signed with UNICS Kazan of the VTB United League.

=== Return to Bursaspor (2023–2024) ===
On July 27, 2023, he signed with Bursaspor of the Turkish Basketbol Süper Ligi (BSL) for a second stint.

=== Türk Telekom (2024–2025) ===
On June 5, 2024, he signed with Türk Telekom of the Turkish Basketbol Süper Ligi (BSL).

=== Beşiktaş (2025–present) ===
On July 9, 2025, he signed with Beşiktaş Gain of the Basketbol Süper Ligi (BSL).

== National team ==
Following the close of his freshman year at Stanford University, Brown was selected to represent USA Basketball on the team sent to Latvia for the 2011 FIBA Under −19 World Championship. Brown appeared in five games with his best performance against Egypt, 10 points, five rebounds and three assists. The United States finished 7–2.

== NBA career statistics ==
Legend
GP	Games played	GS	Games started	MPG	Minutes per game
FG%	Field goal percentage	3P%	3-point field goal percentage	FT%	Free throw percentage
RPG	Rebounds per game	APG	Assists per game	SPG	Steals per game
BPG	Blocks per game	PPG	Points per game	**Bold**	Career high

=== Regular season ===
Year	Team	GP	GS	MPG	FG%	3P%	FT%	RPG	APG	SPG	BPG	PPG
2015–16	L.A. Lakers	**29**	**11**	**20.7**	.310	.286	**.850**	2.4	.7	.5	**.2**	4.0
2016–17	New Orleans	9	0	15.9	.341	.250	–	2.9	.7	**.6**	.1	3.8
2016–17	Orlando	2	0	8.0	.444	.333	–	**3.5**	**1.0**	.0	.0	**4.5**
2017–18	Minnesota	1	0	4.0	**1.000**	**1.000**	–	.0	**1.0**	.0	.0	3.0
Career		41	11	18.6	.328	.286	.850	2.5	.7	.5	.1	3.9
