= Doğuş Özdemiroğlu =

Turkish basketball player (born 1996)

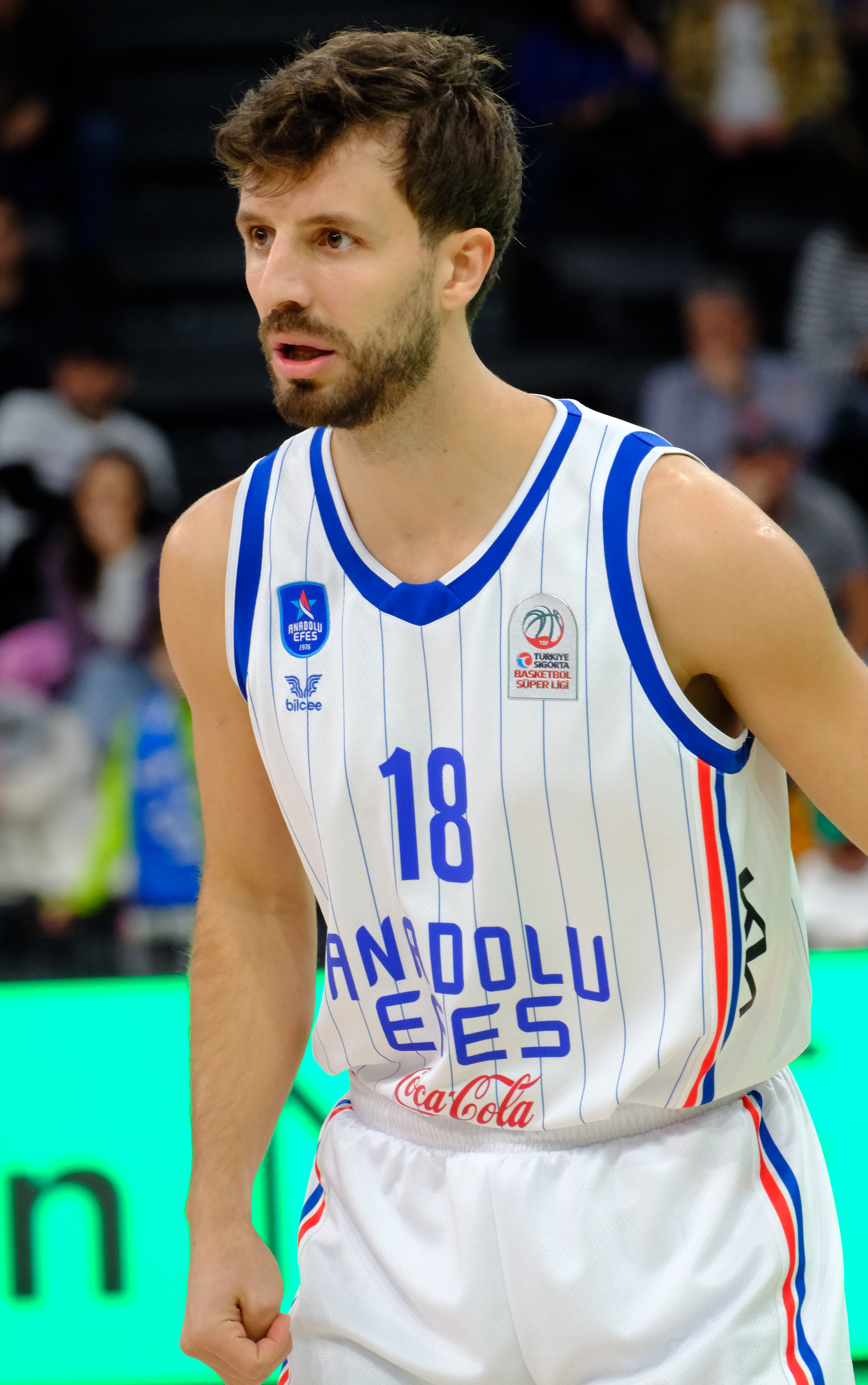

No. 18 – Türk Telekom
- Position: Point guard
- League: BSL; EuroCup

Personal information
- Born: April 17, 1996 (age 30) Balıkesir, Turkey
- Listed height: 6 ft 3 in (1.91 m)
- Listed weight: 194 lb (88 kg)

Career information
- NBA draft: 2018: undrafted
- Playing career: 2013–present

Career history
- 2013–2023: Darüşşafaka
- 2014–2015: → Acıbadem Üniversitesi
- 2015–2016: → Bahçeşehir
- 2016–2017: → Yeşilgiresun
- 2023–2025: Anadolu Efes
- 2025–present: Türk Telekom

Career highlights
- EuroCup champion (2018); EuroCup steals leader (2026); All-Champions League Defensive Team (2023); Turkish Super Cup winner (2024)

Doğuş Özdemiroğlu (born April 17, 1996) is a Turkish professional basketball player for Türk Telekom of the Turkish Basketbol Süper Ligi (BSL) and the EuroCup. He plays at the point guard position.

== Professional career ==
At age 17, Özdemiroğlu joined the Basketball Super League and played in the 2013–14 season for the Darüşşafaka basketball club. He played 17 games over three seasons from 2013 to 2016 and averaged 6.3 points, 3.4 rebounds and 2.9 assists.

During the 2015–16 season he played for Bahçeşehir Koleji S.K., playing 27 games and averaged 6.0 points, 2.9 rebounds and 1.9 assists per game.

During the 2014–15 season Özdemiroğlu was loaned to Acıbadem Üniversitesi to play for the A.Ü. Sports Klub and averaged 3.0 three-point baskets and 6.0 field goals made. He returned to play during the 2015–16 season, starting 18 out of 33 total games.

During the 2016–17 season, Özdemiroğlu was loaned to the Yeşilgiresun basketball club, playing 30 games with the team. He averaged 6.0 points, 2.8 rebounds and 1.8 assists per game.

Özdemiroğlu declared for the 2018 NBA draft in which he was not selected.

From 2017 to 2023, Özdemiroğlu continually played for Darüşşafaka and eventually became team captain. During the 2022-2023 campaign, in 30 BSL games, he averaged a career-high of 14.6 points, 4.8 rebounds, 6.4 assists and 2.4 steals per contest.

On June 24, 2023, Özdemiroğlu signed a two-year contract with Turkish powerhouse Anadolu Efes.

On July 3, 2025, he signed with Türk Telekom of the Turkish Basketbol Süper Ligi (BSL).

== Career statistics ==
Legend
GP	Games played	GS	Games started	MPG	Minutes per game
FG%	Field-goal percentage	3P%	3-point field-goal percentage	FT%	Free-throw percentage
RPG	Rebounds per game	APG	Assists per game	SPG	Steals per game
BPG	Blocks per game	PPG	Points per game	PIR	Performance index rating
**Bold**	Career high

=== EuroLeague ===
Year	Team	GP	GS	MPG	FG%	3P%	FT%	RPG	APG	SPG	BPG	PPG	PIR
2015–16	Darüşşafaka	1	1	5.0	—	.000	—	—	—	—	—	—	-2.0
2018–19	Darüşşafaka	**28**	**3**	**11.5**	**.400**	**.279**	**.680**	**1.2**	**1.2**	**.9**	.0	**3.3**	**2.8**
Career		29	4	11.3	.395	.273	.680	1.2	1.1	.8	.0	3.2	2.6
