= Jaron Blossomgame =

American basketball player (born 1993)

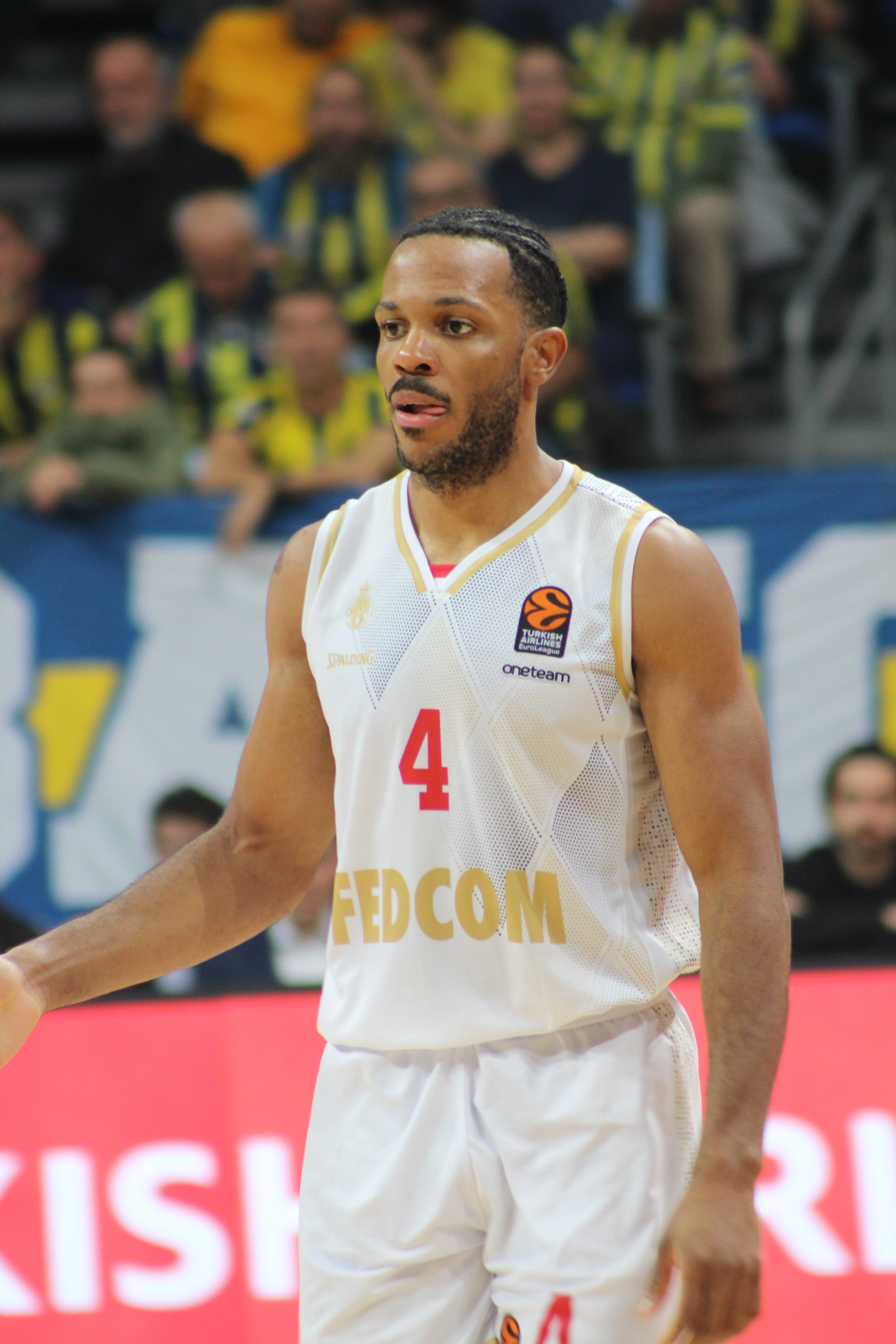
- Blossomgame with AS Monaco in 2024

No. 4 – Dubai Basketball
- Position: Power forward / small forward
- League: ABA League; EuroLeague

Personal information
- Born: September 16, 1993 (age 33) Atlanta, Georgia, U.S.
- Listed height: 6 ft 7 in (2.01 m)
- Listed weight: 220 lb (100 kg)

Career information
- High school: Chattahoochee (Johns Creek, Georgia)
- College: Clemson (2013–2017)
- NBA draft: 2017: 2nd round, 59th overall pick
- Drafted by: San Antonio Spurs
- Playing career: 2017–present

Career history
- 2017–2018: Austin Spurs
- 2018: Canton Charge
- 2018–2019: Cleveland Cavaliers
- 2018–2019: →Canton Charge
- 2019–2020: Rio Grande Valley Vipers
- 2020: Windy City Bulls
- 2020–2021: Ironi Nahariya
- 2021–2022: ratiopharm Ulm
- 2022–2026: AS Monaco
- 2026–present: Dubai Basketball

Career highlights
- All-EuroCup First Team (2022); 3× LNB Élite champion (2023, 2024, 2026); 2× French Cup winner (2023, 2026); French League Cup winner (2026); French Supercup winner (2025); All-LNB Élite Second Team (2025); All-Bundesliga First Team (2022); NBA G League champion (2018); Third-team All NBA G League (2018); First-team All-ACC (2016); Third-team All-ACC (2017); ACC Most Improved Player (2016)
- Stats at NBA.com
- Stats at Basketball Reference

Jaron Samuel Blossomgame (born September 16, 1993) is an American professional basketball player for Dubai Basketball of the ABA League and the EuroLeague. Blossomgame played college basketball for Clemson University and was selected in the second round of the 2017 NBA draft by the San Antonio Spurs.

== High school career ==
Blossomgame attended Chattahoochee High School in Johns Creek, Georgia. He played high school basketball for the Cougars under Head Coach Kacey Martin and Assistants Mason Singletary, Lorenzo Withright, and Haaris Quraishy. After his junior season, he earned first-team all-region and second-team all-state honors after averaging 24 points and 8.8 rebounds per game. As a senior, Blossomgame helped Chattahoochee end the season with a 25–5 record, as his team advanced all the way to the elite 8 before losing to Southwest Dekalb. He joined the Georgia Stars of the Amateur Athletic Union (AAU) in 2011 and led his team with 15.7 points per game. However, that year, Blossomgame broke his leg while trying to dunk with his trainer. His bone protruded from his left leg at the time. After the injury, he expected to wear a cast for the following six to eight weeks.

== College career ==
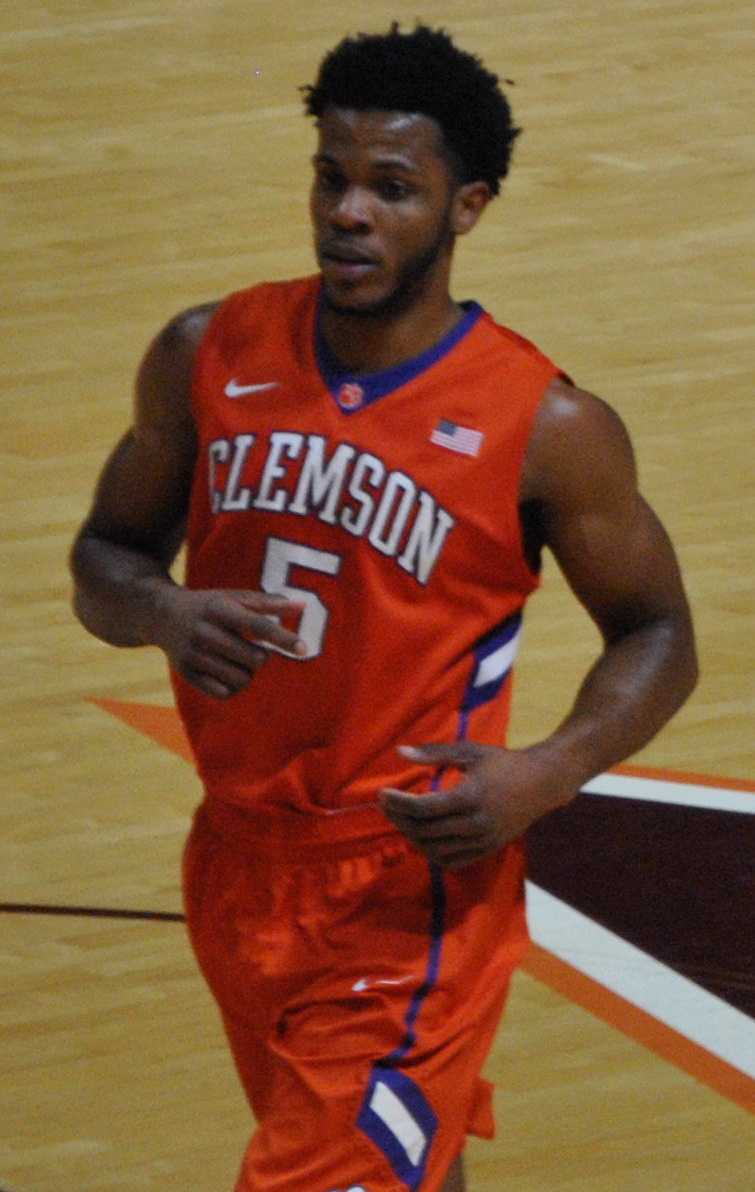
Blossomgame with Clemson in 2016

Blossomgame chose Clemson over VCU, Wichita State, Tennessee Tech and Gardner-Webb. He elected to redshirt the 2012–13 season due to the broken leg suffered in AAU.

After two seasons of steadily-improving production, Blossomgame enjoyed a breakout junior season in 2015–16. Blossomgame averaged 18.7 points and 6.7 rebounds per game and became the 13th Clemson player to be named first-team All-Atlantic Coast Conference (ACC). He was also named the conference's Most Improved Player for the season. Following the season, Blossomgame declared his eligibility for the 2016 NBA draft, and was invited to the NBA Draft Combine. Ultimately, he chose to return to Clemson for his senior season.

Blossomgame was named to the preseason All-ACC team and was named a preseason All-American by several publications. Blossomgame averaged 17.7 points and 6.3 rebounds and led the Tigers to the 2017 National Invitation Tournament, earning third-team All-ACC honors. He was also a finalist for the Senior CLASS Award, earning second-team senior All-American honors. After his last year at Clemson ended, Blossomgame was invited to his second straight NBA Draft Combine event, becoming one of the first players to ever get invited to the event multiple times in different years.

== Professional career ==
=== Austin Spurs (2017–2018) ===
Blossomgame was drafted with the 59th pick in the 2017 NBA draft by the San Antonio Spurs. Blossomgame was later included in the 2017 NBA Summer League roster. In November 2017, Blossomgame joined the Austin Spurs of the NBA G League. In April 2018, he helped Austin win the 2017–18 G League championship. He was subsequently named in the All-NBA G League Third Team.

On September 24, 2018, Blossomgame was included in the training camp roster for the San Antonio Spurs, but was later waived by the Spurs on October 8 after appearing in three preseason games. On October 22, 2018, Blossomgame was included in the training camp roster of the Austin Spurs, and on October 31, Blossomgame was included in Austin's opening night roster.

=== Canton Charge (2018) ===
On November 19, 2018, Canton Charge announced that they had acquired Blossomgame from Austin Spurs in exchange for the returning right of John Holland.

=== Cleveland Cavaliers (2018–2019) ===
After ten games in the G League (in which he averaged 20.9 points and 7.5 rebounds per game), Blossomgame was signed by the Cleveland Cavaliers to a two-way contract with the Charge. On December 5, 2018, Blossomgame made his debut in NBA, coming off the bench in a 105–129 loss to the Golden State Warriors with a rebound. Five days later on December 10, 2018, Blossomgame had his first double-double, coming off the bench in a 92–108 loss to the Milwaukee Bucks with eleven points, ten rebounds, two assists and a block. On June 23, 2019, Blossomgame become an unrestricted free agent.

=== Rio Grande Valley Vipers (2019–2020) ===
On September 27, 2019, Blossomgame signed a training camp contract with the Houston Rockets. Blossomgame was released by the Houston Rockets on October 18. On October 24, the Rio Grande Valley Vipers acquired Blossomgame's rights in exchange for Gary Payton II. Blossomgame was later included in the training camp roster of the Rio Grande Valley Vipers.

=== Windy City Bulls (2020) ===
On February 1, 2020, the Rio Grande Valley Vipers announced that they had traded Blossomgame to the Windy City Bulls with the returning rights to Jonathan Gibson and Kyle Davis in a three-team trade in acquiring Jarell Martin from the Stockton Kings, who received a 1st round draft pick of 2020 NBA G League Draft and the returning right to Charles Cooke from the Bulls.

=== Ironi Nahariya (2020–2021) ===
On August 13, 2020, the Ironi Nahariya announced that they had signed Blossomgame.

=== ratiopharm Ulm (2021–2022) ===
On July 21, 2021, Blossomgame signed with ratiopharm Ulm in Germany.

=== AS Monaco (2022–2026) ===
On July 19, 2022, he signed with AS Monaco of the LNB Pro A. In round 10 of the 2023–24 EuroLeague competition he scored the game winner in a 77–75 win against Baskonia on a tip-in dunk with two seconds remaining on the clock.

=== Dubai Basketball (2026–present) ===
On July 15, 2026, Blossomgame signed a two-year deal with Dubai Basketball of the ABA League and the EuroLeague.

== Career statistics ==
Legend
GP	Games played	GS	Games started	MPG	Minutes per game
FG%	Field-goal percentage	3P%	3-point field-goal percentage	FT%	Free-throw percentage
RPG	Rebounds per game	APG	Assists per game	SPG	Steals per game
BPG	Blocks per game	PPG	Points per game	PIR	Performance index rating
**Bold**	Career high

=== NBA ===
==== Regular season ====
Year	Team	GP	GS	MPG	FG%	3P%	FT%	RPG	APG	SPG	BPG	PPG
2018–19	Cleveland	27	4	16.3	.443	.256	.769	3.6	.5	.3	.3	4.2
Career		27	4	16.3	.443	.256	.769	3.6	.5	.3	.3	4.2

=== EuroLeague ===
Year	Team	GP	GS	MPG	FG%	3P%	FT%	RPG	APG	SPG	BPG	PPG	PIR
2022–23	Monaco	38	**17**	17.3	.435	.250	.556	2.7	.2	.3	.2	5.1	4.4
2023–24	Monaco	**39**	15	**19.6**	**.486**	**.259**	**.656**	**3.3**	**.3**	**.5**	**.3**	**6.6**	**6.4**
Career		77	32	18.5	.464	.255	.597	3.0	.2	.4	.2	5.8	5.4

=== EuroCup ===
Year	Team	GP	GS	MPG	FG%	3P%	FT%	RPG	APG	SPG	BPG	PPG	PIR
2021–22	ratiopharm Ulm	19	19	33.4	.504	.419	.767	7.6	1.3	.9	.6	16.2	19.8
Career		19	19	33.4	.504	.419	.767	7.6	1.3	.9	.6	16.2	19.8

=== Domestic leagues ===
Year	Team	League	GP	MPG	FG%	3P%	FT%	RPG	APG	SPG	BPG	PPG
2017–18	(United States) Austin Spurs	G League	50	29.6	.547	.301	.785	8.1	1.3	.8	.4	16.5
2018–19	(United States) Austin Spurs	G League	6	36.2	.539	.417	.737	8.2	3.3	.3	1.3	23.8
2018–19	(United States) Canton Charge	G League	29	32.7	.440	.301	.695	7.0	2.0	.8	1.2	17.4
2019–20	(United States) R.G. Valley Vipers	G League	27	26.7	.505	.217	.787	6.8	1.4	.6	.6	15.4
2019–20	(United States) Windy City Bulls	G League	15	33.5	.465	.314	.857	8.5	2.6	1.1	.3	16.9
2020–21	(Israel) Ironi Nahariya	Ligat HaAl	30	33.9	.531	.392	.750	6.5	.7	1.0	.9	18.5
2021–22	(Germany) ratiopharm Ulm	BBL	37	31.1	.510	.379	.783	5.4	1.1	.8	.6	15.8
2022–23	(France) Monaco	LNB Élite	36	21.6	.510	.419	.769	3.0	.6	.4	.2	10.1
2023–24	(France) Monaco	LNB Élite	40	20.3	.483	.376	.750	3.0	.5	.3	.4	8.1

=== College ===
Year	Team	GP	GS	MPG	FG%	3P%	FT%	RPG	APG	SPG	BPG	PPG
2012–13	Clemson	Redshirt										
2013–14	Clemson	**33**	30	23.5	.395	.200	.596	5.0	.4	.3	.4	4.9
2014–15	Clemson	31	31	30.9	.486	.288	.708	**8.2**	1.0	**.8**	.4	13.1
2015–16	Clemson	31	31	34.2	**.513**	**.446**	**.782**	6.7	**1.5**	.7	**1.3**	**18.7**
2016–17	Clemson	**33**	**33**	**34.3**	.499	.255	.714	6.3	**1.5**	**.8**	.9	17.7
Career		128	125	30.7	.488	.316	.724	6.5	1.1	.6	.7	13.5
