= David Michineau =

French basketball player (born 1994)

- Michineau with Bursaspor in 2024

No. 6 – Al-Ula
- Position: Point guard
- League: Saudi Basketball League

Personal information
- Born: June 6, 1994 (age 32) Les Abymes, Guadeloupe
- Listed height: 6 ft 4 in (1.93 m)
- Listed weight: 180 lb (82 kg)

Career information
- NBA draft: 2016: 2nd round, 39th overall pick
- Drafted by: New Orleans Pelicans
- Playing career: 2013–present

Career history
- 2013–2016: Élan Chalon
- 2013–2014: →Châlons-Reims
- 2016–2017: Hyères-Toulon
- 2017–2018: Cholet
- 2017–2022: Metropolitans 92
- 2022–2023: Napoli Basket
- 2023–2025: Bursaspor
- 2025–2026: AS Monaco
- 2026: Dar City
- 2026–present: Al-Ula

Career highlights
- French League Cup winner (2026); French Supercup winner (2025)
- Stats at Basketball Reference

David Benoit Michineau (born June 6, 1994) is a French professional basketball player for Al-Ula of the Saudi Basketball League. He was drafted by the New Orleans Pelicans in the 2016 NBA draft, with his rights being traded to the Los Angeles Clippers not too long afterwards.

== Professional career ==
Born in the French overseas department of Guadeloupe, Michineau made his professional debut for French LNB Pro A outfit ES Chalon-Sur-Saône during the 2013–14 season. In the 2015–16 season, Michineau helped Chalon advance to the final of the Leaders Cup and to the Final Four of the FIBA Europe Cup. He also saw the court in 34 Pro A contests that season with per-game averages of 5.6 points, one rebound and 1.5 assists.

On July 22, 2016, Michineau returned to France, signing with Hyères-Toulon.

Michineau re-signed with Levallois Metropolitans on May 4, 2020.

In the off-season 2022, he left for Italy, agreeing terms with Napoli Basket of the Lega Basket Serie A.

On August 4, 2023, Michineau signed with Bursaspor of the Turkish Basketbol Süper Ligi (BSL).

=== NBA draft rights ===
On June 23, 2016, Michineau was selected by the New Orleans Pelicans in the 2016 NBA draft and was then traded to the Los Angeles Clippers on draft night. He joined the Clippers for the 2016 NBA Summer League.

On February 10, 2022, Michineau's draft rights were traded to the Sacramento Kings as part of a four-team trade. On February 8, 2023, the Kings traded the draft rights to Michineau to the Brooklyn Nets in exchange for Kessler Edwards and cash considerations.

== National team career ==
In 2012, Michineau played the Albert-Schweitzer-Tournament in Germany with the French under 18 national team.
