= Alpha Diallo (basketball, born 1997) =

American basketball player (born 1997)

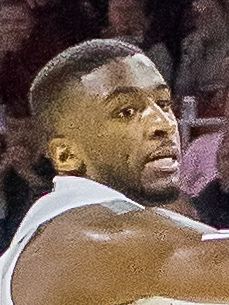
- Diallo with Providence in 2018

No. 11 – Denver Nuggets
- Position: Shooting guard
- League: NBA

Personal information
- Born: June 29, 1997 (age 29) New York City, New York, U.S.
- Listed height: 6 ft 7 in (2.01 m)
- Listed weight: 210 lb (95 kg)

Career information
- High school: West (Denver, Colorado); Frederick Douglass Academy (Harlem, New York); Brewster Academy (Wolfeboro, New Hampshire)
- College: Providence (2016–2020)
- NBA draft: 2020: undrafted
- Playing career: 2020–present

Career history
- 2020–2021: Lavrio
- 2021–2026: AS Monaco
- 2026–present: Denver Nuggets

Career highlights
- EuroLeague Best Defender (2026); EuroLeague steals leader (2026); 3× LNB Élite champion (2023, 2024, 2026); 2× French Cup winner (2023, 2026); French League Cup winner (2026); French Supercup winner (2025); 2× All-LNB Élite First Team (2022, 2025); 2× All-LNB Élite Second Team (2023, 2026); 2× LNB Élite Best Defender (2025, 2026); 2× Second-team All-Big East (2019, 2020)
- Stats at NBA.com
- Stats at Basketball Reference
Medals
Representing the United States
Pan American Games
| Bronze medal – third place | 2019 Lima | National team |

Alpha Saliou Diallo (born June 29, 1997) is an American and Guinean professional basketball player for the Denver Nuggets of the National Basketball Association (NBA). He played college basketball for the Providence Friars and for the AS Monaco of the French LNB Pro A and the EuroLeague. Diallo plays for the Guinea national team internationally.

== High school career ==
Diallo was born and grew up in New York City but moved to Denver, Colorado with his mother. He played at Denver West High School as a sophomore and led the team to the Sweet 16 in the Class 4A tournament. He was declared ineligible by the Colorado High School Activities Association after attempting to transfer to Abraham Lincoln High School, coached by his mentor Vince Valdez. Diallo played two seasons at Frederick Douglass Academy in Harlem. He did a postgraduate year at Brewster Academy and averaged 16.5 points and 6.5 rebounds per game. He scored 35 points and had eight rebounds and eight assists against eventual national champion Hargrave Military Academy. Diallo represented Team Africa in the adidas Nations circuit and averaged 20.5 points and 10.7 rebounds per game. Diallo was ranked the 95th best player in his class and signed with Providence after Junior Lomomba's transfer opened up a scholarship. He chose the Friars over offers from Oklahoma State and VCU.

== College career ==
As a freshman, Diallo averaged 5.7 points and 3.2 rebounds per game. Diallo averaged 13.2 points, 6.6 rebounds, and 2.3 assists per game as a sophomore and often defended the opposing team's best player. However, he only shot 21 percent from three-point range, and worked on his shooting in the summer. As a junior, Diallo was named to the Second Team All-Big East. He averaged 16 points, 8.1 rebounds, 3.1 assists, and 1.6 steals per game, leading the team in all four categories. Diallo declared for the 2019 NBA draft but decided to return to Providence. Coming into his senior season, he was named to the Preseason First Team All-Big East. On February 16, 2020, Diallo scored a career-high 35 points in a 74–71 upset of tenth-ranked Seton Hall, shooting 11-of-15 from the floor. He was named Big East Player of the Week on February 17. As a senior, Diallo averaged 14.1 points and 7.8 rebounds per game and was a repeat selection to the Second Team All-Big East.

== Professional career ==
=== Lavrio ===
On September 9, 2020, Diallo signed his first professional contract with Lavrio of the Greek Basket League. During the very successful 2020–2021 campaign, where the club reached the Greek Basket League finals for the first time, Diallo averaged 12.9 points, 5.4 rebounds, 2 assists, and 1.5 steals per game.

=== AS Monaco ===
On July 24, 2021, Diallo signed a three-year contract with Greek League champions and EuroLeague mainstays Panathinaikos, but never appeared in a single official game with them. On August 30 of the same year, he signed with AS Monaco of the French LNB Pro A.

On May 18, 2022, he was named to the All-LNB Pro A First Team. Diallo helped Monaco reach the Finals of the Pro A, where they lost to LDLC ASVEL.

On April 19, 2025, Diallo renewed his contract with Monaco for an additional three seasons. In the 2024–25 EuroLeague, Monaco surprisingly advanced to the final of the Final Four, becoming the first French team in 32 years to reach the European final. In the final, Diallo scored a team-high 19 points, however, Monaco lost to Fenerbahçe to finish as runners-up. Diallo was the top scorer of the final four with a combined 41 points over two games.

=== Denver Nuggets ===
On July 12, 2026, Diallo signed a one–year, $1.4 million contract with the Denver Nuggets of the National Basketball Association.

== National team career ==
In the summer of 2019, Diallo was a part of the United States national team that competed at the Pan American Games in Peru. The team won bronze, defeating the Dominican Republic 92–83 with 23 points and five rebounds from Diallo. Diallo led the team in scoring (15.0), rebounding (5.6) and steals (1.6) per game.

Later, Diallo switched to play for the Guinea national team. He represented them at the FIBA AfroBasket 2025, where he averaged 23.8 points per game.

== Career statistics ==
Legend
| GP | Games played | GS | Games started | MPG | Minutes per game |
| FG% | Field-goal percentage | 3P% | 3-point field-goal percentage | FT% | Free-throw percentage |
| RPG | Rebounds per game | APG | Assists per game | SPG | Steals per game |
| BPG | Blocks per game | PPG | Points per game | PIR | Performance index rating |
| **Bold** | Career high |

=== EuroLeague ===
| * | Led the league |

| Year | Team | GP | GS | MPG | FG% | 3P% | FT% | RPG | APG | SPG | BPG | PPG | PIR |
|---|---|---|---|---|---|---|---|---|---|---|---|---|---|
| 2021–22 | Monaco | 34 | 26 | 24.6 | .494 | .382 | .732 | **4.8** | 1.7 | **1.4** | .3 | 9.6 | 11.5 |
| 2022–23 | Monaco | **41*** | 15 | 24.8 | .459 | .298 | .750 | 4.2 | **2.0** | 1.3 | .3 | 10.5 | 11.1 |
| 2023–24 | Monaco | 38 | 16 | 26.9 | .485 | .389 | .750 | 4.2 | 1.7 | 1.1 | .4 | 10.6 | 11.8 |
| 2024–25 | Monaco | 35 | 27 | 26.5 | **.563** | **.440** | .667 | 4.0 | 1.7 | 1.0 | .3 | 11.5 | 13.1 |
| 2025–26 | Monaco | **41** | **41** | **27.5** | .490 | .314 | **.796** | 4.4 | 1.4 | **1.4** | **.5** | **11.9** | **13.6** |
| Career | | 189 | 125 | 25.4 | .496 | .353 | .745 | 4.3 | 1.7 | 1.2 | .4 | 10.9 | 12.1 |

=== Domestic leagues ===
| Year | Team | League | GP | MPG | FG% | 3P% | FT% | RPG | APG | SPG | BPG | PPG |
|---|---|---|---|---|---|---|---|---|---|---|---|---|
| 2020–21 | (Greece) Lavrio | GBL | 33 | 29.6 | .529 | .411 | .651 | 5.4 | 2.0 | 1.3 | .5 | 12.5 |
| 2021–22 | (France) Monaco | LNB Élite | 36 | 26.3 | .517 | .420 | .701 | 5.2 | 1.9 | 1.0 | .3 | 11.3 |
| 2022–23 | (France) Monaco | LNB Élite | 37 | 22.4 | .544 | .355 | .827 | 4.4 | 2.1 | .7 | .2 | 10.9 |
| 2023–24 | (France) Monaco | LNB Élite | 39 | 21.9 | .500 | .392 | .735 | 3.8 | 1.9 | .8 | .1 | 9.9 |
| 2024–25 | (France) Monaco | LNB Élite | 38 | 25.5 | .535 | .382 | .640 | 4.1 | 1.7 | .8 | .4 | 10.9 |
| 2025–26 | (France) Monaco | LNB Élite | 28 | 22.5 | .489 | .360 | .679 | 4.3 | 2.0 | .9 | .4 | 10.9 |

=== College ===
| Year | Team | GP | GS | MPG | FG% | 3P% | FT% | RPG | APG | SPG | BPG | PPG |
|---|---|---|---|---|---|---|---|---|---|---|---|---|
| 2016–17 | Providence | 33 | 16 | 21.4 | .407 | .243 | **.738** | 3.2 | 1.2 | .9 | .2 | 5.7 |
| 2017–18 | Providence | 32 | 31 | 30.7 | **.466** | .214 | .733 | 6.6 | 2.3 | 1.0 | .3 | 13.2 |
| 2018–19 | Providence | **34** | **34** | **35.4** | .420 | **.333** | .674 | **8.1** | **3.1** | **1.6** | .5 | **16.0** |
| 2019–20 | Providence | 31 | 30 | 32.7 | .414 | .313 | .632 | 7.8 | 2.5 | 1.5 | **.9** | 14.1 |
| Career | | 130 | 111 | 30.0 | .429 | .291 | .684 | 6.4 | 2.3 | 1.3 | .5 | 12.2 |
