= Mike James (basketball, born 1990) =

American basketball player (born 1990)

- James with Anadolu Efes in 2026

No. 55 – Anadolu Efes
- Position: Point guard
- League: BSL; EuroLeague

Personal information
- Born: August 18, 1990 (age 36) Portland, Oregon, U.S.
- Listed height: 1.86 m (6 ft 1 in)
- Listed weight: 196 lb (89 kg)

Career information
- High school: Grant (Portland, Oregon)
- College: Eastern Arizona (2008–2010); Lamar (2010–2012)
- NBA draft: 2012: undrafted
- Playing career: 2012–present

Career history
- 2012: Zagreb
- 2013: Hapoel Galil Elyon
- 2013–2014: Paffoni Omegna
- 2014: Kolossos Rodou
- 2014–2016: Baskonia
- 2016–2017: Panathinaikos
- 2017: Phoenix Suns
- 2018: New Orleans Pelicans
- 2018: Panathinaikos
- 2018–2019: Olimpia Milano
- 2019–2021: CSKA Moscow
- 2021: Brooklyn Nets
- 2021–2026: AS Monaco
- 2026–present: Anadolu Efes

Career highlights
- EuroLeague MVP (2024); 2× All-EuroLeague First Team (2022, 2024); 3× All-EuroLeague Second Team (2019, 2023, 2025); Alphonso Ford EuroLeague Top Scorer Trophy (2019); EuroLeague 25th Anniversary Team (2025); 3× French League champion (2023, 2024, 2026); 2× French Cup winner (2023, 2026); French League Cup winner (2026); French Supercup winner (2025); 2× All-LNB Élite First Team (2024, 2025); All-LNB Élite Second Team (2023); LNB Élite Finals MVP (2024); French Supercup MVP (2025); LNB All-Star (2023); LNB All-Star Game MVP (2023); VTB United League champion (2021); 2× VTB United League Supercup winner (2021, 2026); All-VTB United League First Team (2020); VTB United League Supercup MVP (2026); 2× Greek League champion (2017, 2018); Greek Cup winner (2017); 2× Greek League Finals MVP (2017, 2018); Greek League Most Spectacular Player (2017); Italian Supercup winner (2018); First-team All-Southland (2012); EuroLeague career stats leaders: EuroLeague all-time leading scorer
- Stats at NBA.com
- Stats at Basketball Reference

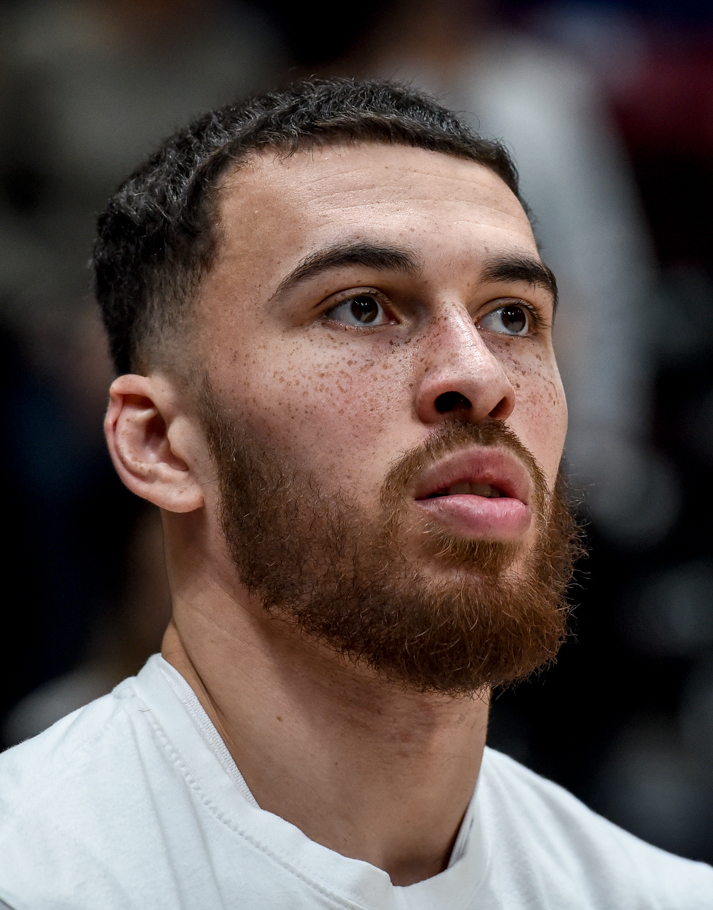
James in 2019

Michael Perry James (born August 18, 1990) is an American professional basketball player for Anadolu Efes of the Turkish Basketbol Süper Ligi (BSL) and the EuroLeague.

He was a high school basketball standout playing for Grant High School in Portland, and played college basketball for Eastern Arizona College and Lamar University. James was the first player in NBA history to go from a two-way contract to a regular contract, all while never being sent down to the NBA G League in the process.

James started his professional career in Europe in 2012 and is five-time All-EuroLeague selection. He was the EuroLeague scoring champion in 2019. Since 2024, James is the all-time scoring leader in EuroLeague history. He was also named EuroLeague MVP of the 2023–24 season.

== Early life and career ==
James was born and raised in Portland, Oregon. While in Portland, he played basketball for Grant High School under coach Tony Broadous. In 2007–08, as a senior, he was ranked the No. 3 player in the state and No. 184 overall. He was also only recruited by Division III universities at the time. James averaged 15 points, 4 rebounds and 3 steals per game. The team went on to win the 2008 Oregon state championship, defeating Oregon City for it.

== College career ==
=== Eastern Arizona College ===
James started his college career at Eastern Arizona College, a national junior college where he played under coach Maurice Leitzke. In his first year, he averaged 20 points per game shooting 42 percent overall, 33.3 percent from three-point range and 78 percent free throws. He was named all-conference and all-region teams as well as being ranked No. 40 best junior college player by Rivals.com. As a sophomore, he was the fourth-leading scorer in the NJCAA Division I recording 26 points per game. In addition he contributed 5 rebounds, 4 assists and 2 steals.

=== Lamar University ===
In 2010, James transferred to an NCAA Division I school, Lamar University in Beaumont, Texas where he played under coach Steve Roccaforte in 2010–11 and coach Pat Knight in the 2011–12 NCAA season. Playing a little over 18 minutes a game, he averaged 12.5 points, 2.4 rebounds, 1.8 assists and 1.1 steals. He led the team in scoring, even though he only started two out of twenty-four games for the season. He registered a 52-point game on January 4, 2011, against Louisiana College, which the Lamar Cardinals won 114–62, breaking the previous record of 50 set by Mike Oliver in 1980. In addition, he broke Lamar University's Montagne Center record for most points scored in a single game with 52, field goals made with 18, field goal attempts with 35, three-pointers made with 11, and three-point attempts with 21. In his senior season (2011–12), he averaged 17.1 points, 3.2 rebounds, 2 assists and 1.6 steals per game shooting 45.3 percent overall. One notable game of his was against the 2012 NCAA champion University of Kentucky, in which he scored 29 points. His senior season ended in the first round of the 2012 NCAA tournament with a loss against Vermont. By the end of his season, he was named All-Southland First Team, Southland Tournament MVP and Southland Conference Player of the Week three times in four weeks. He had majored in general studies during his time there.

== Professional career ==
=== Zagreb (2012) ===
In August 2012, James signed with Zagreb of Croatia for the 2012–13 season. In December 2012, he left Zagreb.

=== Hapoel Galil Elyon (2013) ===
In February 2013, he signed with Hapoel Galil Elyon of the Israeli second-tier league for the rest of the season.

=== Paffoni Omegna (2013–2014) ===
In July 2013, James signed with Paffoni Omegna of Italy under their DNA Silver Basket league name for the 2013–14 season. That season, they finished in fourth place for the DNA Silver portion of the league.

=== Kolossos Rodou (2014) ===
In August 2014, James signed a one-year contract with Kolossos Rodou of Greece.

=== Baskonia (2014–2016) ===
On December 2, 2014, he left Kolossos and signed with the Spanish club Laboral Kutxa Baskonia of the Liga ACB for the rest of the season.

In July 2015, James joined the Phoenix Suns for the 2015 NBA Summer League. That same month, after a successful Summer League performance, he re-signed with Baskonia for one more season. During that season, Saski Baskonia would reach the EuroLeague Final Four, losing to the Fenerbahçe Ülker and the PBC Lokomotiv Kuban for a fourth-place performance.

=== Panathinaikos (2016–2017) ===
On July 3, 2016, James signed with Panathinaikos in Greece for the 2016–17 season. That year saw him perform his best work in the EuroLeague yet. He helped the Panathinaikos win both the Greek Cup title and the Greek Basket League championship in the 2016–17 season. He was later named the Greek Basket League's Most Spectacular Player that year as well.

=== Phoenix Suns (2017) ===
On July 3, 2017, James signed with the Phoenix Suns and joined the team for the 2017 NBA Summer League. In the 2017 Summer League, he led the team in points and assists, averaging 20.5 points off of 53.8% shooting and 5.0 assists per game, as well as recording 5.2 rebounds and 1.8 steals in 33.2 minutes per game for the six games the Suns played during the event. James's contract with the team was a two-way affiliate deal, their first in franchise history. He also became the first player to sign a two-way contract in the NBA after spending multiple years overseas in international leagues. While James was eligible to split his time between Phoenix and their Northern Arizona Suns G League affiliate, he never joined the G League team during his two-way contract. James made his NBA debut on October 18, 2017, against the Portland Trail Blazers, recording 12 points that night. James became the first player to sign a two-way contract to also start with the team that signed him on, as he became the starting point guard on the October 23 game against the Sacramento Kings under interim head coach Jay Triano, recording 18 points and a team-high 7 assists in a 117–115 win. During his first four games of the season, James recorded at least 10 or more points with increased minute production in each game. On Halloween night, James recorded his first 20-point game with 24 points scored and four steals recorded in a 122–114 win over the Brooklyn Nets. On November 26, 2017, he scored a career-high 26 points in a 119–108 loss to the Minnesota Timberwolves. James would play his last game under his original two-way contract on December 5 against the Toronto Raptors, recording 10 points in a 126–113 loss. During this time, James would be considered the biggest success story to date revolving around the NBA's newest implemented system.

On December 7, 2017, James's contract with the Suns was converted to a one-year regular season deal, after Phoenix waived Derrick Jones Jr. However, on December 23, 2017, over two weeks after signing his one-year deal, James was waived by the Suns.

=== New Orleans Pelicans (2018) ===
On January 14, 2018, the New Orleans Pelicans signed James to a new two-way contract. Much like his tenure with Phoenix, James was never assigned to the NBA G League during his two-way contract with New Orleans. On February 10, 2018, he was waived by the Pelicans after appearing in four games.

=== Return to Panathinaikos ===
On February 13, 2018, Panathinaikos announced the return of James. He started the season playing shooting guard for the Greens, alongside Nick Calathes. On March 22, James scored the game-winning shot with 5.8 seconds left against Maccabi Tel Aviv. He finished the game with 27 points.

=== Olimpia Milano (2018–2019) ===
On July 13, 2018, Olimpia Milano signed James to a multi-year contract. Over 30 games of the 2018–19 EuroLeague season, he averaged league-high 19.8 points, along with 6.8 assists and 3.8 rebounds per game. He won the Alphonso Ford Trophy, given to the top scorer of the EuroLeague.

But despite the statistically excellent season, the incoming Olimpia Milano coach, Ettore Messina, declared Mike James wouldn't be part of the 2019–20 team plans. James and the Italian team eventually reached an agreement and mutually parted ways on July 29, 2019.

=== CSKA Moscow (2019–2021) ===
On August 5, 2019, James signed a one-year contract with CSKA Moscow of the VTB United League and the EuroLeague. On June 1, 2020, he signed a three-year contract extension with CSKA. On April 21, 2021, he and CSKA came to an agreement that allowed the player to become a free agent until the end of the 2020–21 season. James averaged 19.3 points and 5.7 assists per game in the 2020–21 EuroLeague season. On September 11, 2021, James and the Russian club officially reached a buy-out agreement in order to terminate their mutual contract.

=== Brooklyn Nets (2021) ===
On April 23, 2021, James signed a 10-day contract with the Brooklyn Nets. On the same day of his signing, James debuted for the Nets against the Boston Celtics, logging eight points on 3-of-8 shooting from the field and 1-of-1 from three-point range to go along with two rebounds and two assists across 21 minutes in a 109–104 win. On May 3, James signed a second 10-day contract with the Nets. On May 13, James was signed for the rest of the 2020–21 season.

=== Monaco (2021–2026) ===
==== 2021–22 season ====
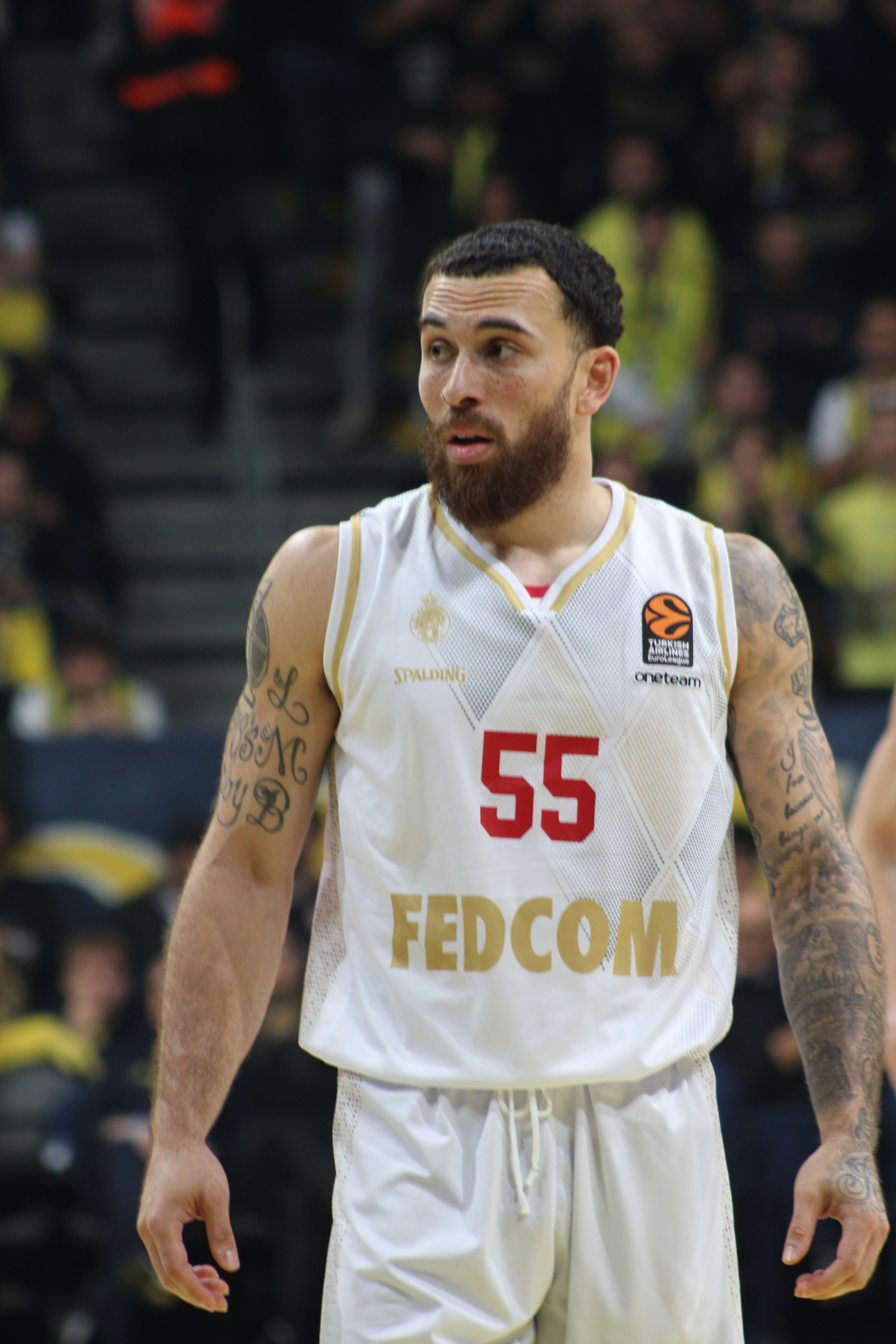
James in a EuroLeague game with Monaco in 2024

On September 17, 2021, James signed with AS Monaco Basket of the French LNB Pro A. On July 14, 2022, James signed a two-year contract extension with Monaco.

==== 2022–23 season: First EuroLeague Final Four appearance ====
On March 14, 2023, Monaco temporarily suspended James for an internal violation of team rules. After this episode, he went on to lead the team to the 2023 EuroLeague Final Four, the first ever appearance of the club in the Final Four. He scored 17 points in Monaco's loss in semi-finals.

On October 26, 2023, after scoring 24 points against Maccabi Tel Aviv, James became the fastest player in EuroLeague history to reach 4,000 career points, doing so in 248 games.

==== 2023–24 season: EuroLeague MVP and French title ====
James was named to the LNB All-Star Game in the 2023–24 season, and on December 31, led Team World to a victory over Team France. He scored 34 points and was named the All-Star Game MVP.

On March 7, 2024, Mike James became the EuroLeague's all-time leading scorer during a regular season game against Red Star Belgrade. He surpassed Vassilis Spanoulis after having scored 4,464 points after the game. On May 14, James was named the EuroLeague MVP for the 2023–24 season after leading Monaco to a club record in wins and scoring in double-digits in all of his games. He averaged 17.9 points, a career-high 4.9 rebounds and 5.1 assists per game. Monaco just failed to reach the playoffs, losing in five games to Fenerbahce in the quarterfinals, losing a crucial Game 5 at home.

On June 14, 2024, James officially signed a lucrative three-year extension that would keep him in Monaco through 2027.

==== 2024–25 season: EuroLeague runners-up ====
In the 2024–25 EuroLeague, James led Monaco to a second Final Four appearance, returning after a one-year absence. In the quarterfinal series against Barcelona, James was crucial as he scored the game-winner in the deciding Game 5. In the surprisingly advanced to the final of the Final Four, becoming the first French team in 32 years to reach the European final. In the semi-final against favored Olympiacos, James had 17 points, 7 rebounds, 7 assists, leading the team to a 75–65 victory. In the final, however, Monaco lost 70–81 to Fenerbahçe to finish as runners-up, despite James adding 17 points and five rebounds.

During the season, James was also recognised for his historical performance in the EuroLeague, as he was named to the All-25 EuroLeague Team, composed of the best twenty-five players in league history.

==== 2025–2026 ====
On November 21, 2025, James was suspended for three games after receiving two technical fouls being ejected during a French League game. On April 18, 2026, he was ejected during a league game against ASVEL Basket, once again receiving a three-game suspension. In the same month, he received a conditionally suspended one-game ban and a fine after being ejected during a 2026 EuroLeague Playoffs game against Olympiacos.

=== Anadolu Efes (2026–present) ===
On July 11, 2026, James signed with Anadolu Efes of the Turkish Basketbol Süper Ligi (BSL).

== The Basketball Tournament ==
James has played for Team Maryland and Team Hines in The Basketball Tournament (TBT), an annual single-elimination winner-take-all tournament on ESPN. In two games with Team Maryland in TBT 2016, Mike James averaged 28.5 points, 4.0 assists and 6.5 rebounds per game. James's most impressive outing was a 35-point, seven-rebound outburst in a 104–92 loss against Team Foe. Three years later in TBT 2019, James led Team Hines to the Semifinal Round in which they lost to the Golden Eagles, 68–62. In five games, James averaged 16.4 points and 5.4 assists per game, while shooting 36.8 percent from the field.

== Controversial comment ==
In early August 2022, James received media attention after making critical comments about NBA star Stephen Curry. James referred to Curry as being "one-dimensional" and negatively compared Curry to other NBA stars such as LeBron James, Kevin Durant, Joel Embiid, Giannis Antetokounmpo and Luka Dončić. Curry himself later jokingly referred to the "one-dimensional" jab from James while talking with the media at a basketball camp he was hosting for elite high school players.

== Career statistics ==
Legend
GP	Games played	GS	Games started	MPG	Minutes per game
FG%	Field-goal percentage	3P%	3-point field-goal percentage	FT%	Free-throw percentage
RPG	Rebounds per game	APG	Assists per game	SPG	Steals per game
BPG	Blocks per game	PPG	Points per game	PIR	Performance index rating
**Bold**	Career high

=== NBA ===
==== Regular season ====
Year	Team	GP	GS	MPG	FG%	3P%	FT%	RPG	APG	SPG	BPG	PPG
2017–18	Phoenix	32	10	20.9	.388	.268	.762	2.8	3.7	.8	.2	10.4
2017–18	New Orleans	4	0	4.5	.222	.000	—	.2	1.5	.2	—	1.0
2020–21	Brooklyn	13	1	18.2	.370	.355	.778	2.5	4.1	.5	.1	7.7
Career		49	11	18.8	.380	.287	.766	2.5	3.7	.7	.2	8.9

==== Playoffs ====
Year	Team	GP	GS	MPG	FG%	3P%	FT%	RPG	APG	SPG	BPG	PPG
2021	Brooklyn	9	0	11.4	.326	.313	—	1.8	1.3	.2	—	3.7
Career		9	0	11.4	.326	.313	—	1.8	1.3	.2	—	3.7

=== EuroLeague ===
*	Led the league

Year	Team	GP	GS	MPG	FG%	3P%	FT%	RPG	APG	SPG	BPG	PPG	PIR
2014–15	Baskonia	16	6	19.2	.401	.226	.844	2.4	1.9	1.1	.0	11.1	8.0
2015–16	Baskonia	29	0	21.2	.424	.368	**.864**	2.6	2.7	.6	**.1**	10.0	10.1
2016–17	Panathinaikos	25	1	22.6	**.490**	.340	.688	2.2	3.0	.9	**.1**	13.1	13.1
2017–18	Panathinaikos	12	11	25.3	.478	.242	.707	2.8	4.1	**1.3**	**.1**	16.2	15.7
2018–19	Olimpia Milano	30	30	**33.9***	.404	.326	.826	3.8	6.4	**1.3**	.0	19.8*	20.2*
2019–20	CSKA Moscow	28*	25	28.6	.440	**.420**	.833	3.3	4.3	.7	**.1**	**21.1**	20.9
2020–21	CSKA Moscow	27	16	31.1	.430	.354	.814	3.1	5.7	1.0	**.1**	19.3	19.7*
2021–22	Monaco	38	32	31.1	.411	.313	.833	3.2	5.8	1.2	**.1**	16.4	18.1
2022–23	Monaco	38	38	30.3	.382	.273	.783	3.7	4.4	1.0	.0	15.9	16.3
2023–24	Monaco	39	39	31.7*	.426	.372	.772	**4.1**	5.1	1.2	**.1**	17.9	19.4
2024–25	Monaco	**41**	**41**	29.2	.397	.330	.789	3.0	5.8	1.1	.0	15.9	17.4
2025–26	Monaco	39	39	29.9	.423	.327	.860	3.5	**6.5**	.9	.1	16.4	19.1
Career		362	278	28.7	.420	.333	.808	3.2	4.9	1.0	.1	16.3	17.1

=== Domestic leagues ===
Year	Team	League	GP	MPG	FG%	3P%	FT%	RPG	APG	SPG	BPG	PPG
2012–13	(Croatia) Zagreb	Premijer liga	9	28.7	.466	.313	.679	3.1	2.7	2.3	.3	19.1
2013–14	(United States) Portland Chinooks	IBL	2	45.0	.466	.200	.640	8.5	6.0	3.0	.5	44.5
2013–14	(United States) Seattle Flight	IBL	1	25.0	.333	.000	1.000	2.0	1.0	—	—	9.0
2013–14	(Italy) Fulgor Omegna	Serie A2	27	35.1	.499	.355	.789	5.6	5.1	1.9	.2	22.9
2014–15	(Greece) Kolossos Rodou	GBL	8	33.6	.457	.400	.889	5.1	3.4	.9	.2	21.0
2014–15	(Spain) Baskonia	ACB	27	22.6	.456	.379	.881	2.3	2.9	1.1	.1	12.9
2015–16	(Spain) Baskonia	ACB	41	20.6	.437	.302	.816	2.0	2.8	.7	.1	10.2
2016–17	(Greece) Panathinaikos	GBL	24	21.3	.422	.278	.884	2.7	2.9	.9	.1	12.0
2017–18	(Greece) Panathinaikos	GBL	12	21.0	.431	.295	.815	2.6	3.4	.7	.1	13.6
2018–19	(Italy) Olimpia Milano	LBA	28	25.6	.399	.339	.781	3.4	5.0	1.4	.1	15.6
2019–20	(Russia) CSKA Moscow	VTBUL	18	22.9	.462	.438	.825	2.4	4.4	.9	.1	17.6
2020–21	(Russia) CSKA Moscow	VTBUL	14	20.3	.520	.435	.857	2.4	3.9	.9	.1	14.7
2021–22	(France) Monaco	LNB Élite	29	30.1	.383	.294	.753	3.5	5.4	1.2	.1	16.4
2022–23	(France) Monaco	LNB Élite	31	24.5	.389	.274	.738	3.0	5.4	.9	.1	13.0
2023–24	(France) Monaco	LNB Élite	31	23.0	.415	.367	.794	3.0	3.4	.9	.1	14.1
2024–25	(France) Monaco	LNB Élite	18	23.3	.397	.406	.875	2.2	4.2	1.1	.1	14.0
2025–26	(France) Monaco	LNB Élite	15	23.7	.485	.429	.863	2.9	4.9	1.0	.0	16.0

=== College ===
Year	Team	GP	GS	MPG	FG%	3P%	FT%	RPG	APG	SPG	BPG	PPG
2010–11	Lamar	24	2	18.4	.420	.357	.800	2.4	1.8	1.1	.1	12.5
2011–12	Lamar	32	27	31.1	.453	.325	.806	3.2	2.0	1.6	.1	17.1
Career		56	29	25.7	.441	.339	.803	2.8	1.9	1.4	.1	15.1
