= Nadir Hifi =

French-Algerian basketball player (born 2002)

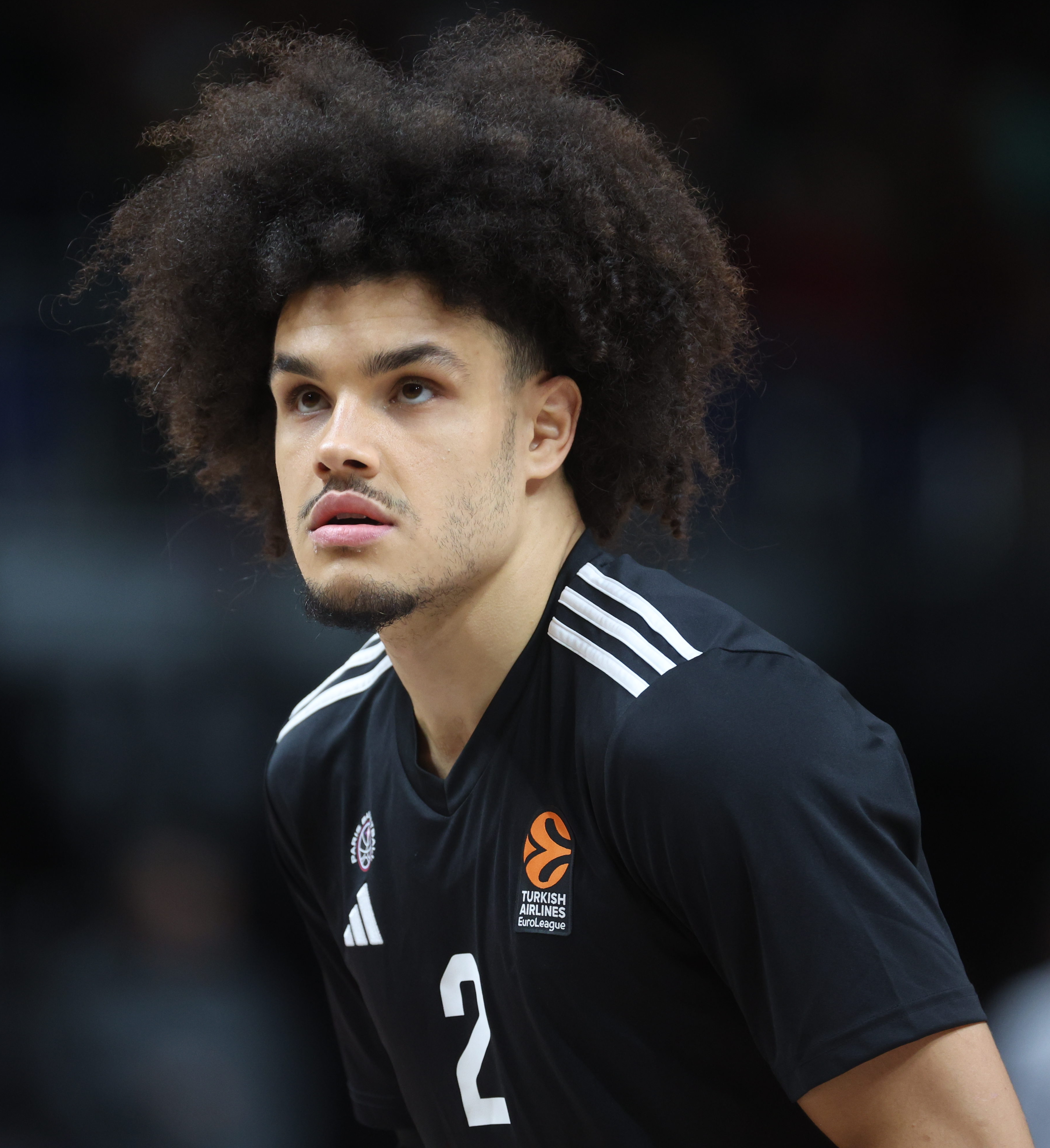
- Hifi in 2024

No. 2 – Paris Basketball
- Position: Shooting guard / point guard
- League: LNB Élite; EuroLeague

Personal information
- Born: 16 July 2002 (age 24) Strasbourg, France
- Listed height: 5 ft 11 in (1.80 m)
- Listed weight: 180 lb (82 kg)

Career information
- NBA draft: 2023: undrafted
- Playing career: 2020–present

Career history
- 2020–2023: Le Portel
- 2023–present: Paris Basketball

Career highlights
- EuroLeague Rising Star (2025); EuroCup champion (2024); All-EuroCup Second Team (2024); LNB Élite champion (2025); French Cup winner (2025); Leaders Cup winner (2024); French Supercup winner (2026); 2× All-LNB Élite First Team (2024, 2026); All-LNB Élite Second Team (2025); 2× LNB Élite Top Scorer (2025, 2026); French Cup Final MVP (2025); French Supercup MVP (2026)

Nadir Hifi (born 16 July 2002) is a French-Algerian basketball player for Paris Basketball of the French LNB Élite and the EuroLeague. Standing at 5 ft 11 in (1.80 m), Hifi plays at the shooting guard and point guard positions.

== Professional career ==
Hifi's professional career began with Le Portel in 2020, following years spent in the youth academy of SIG Strasbourg, his local club. Hifi would spend three seasons with Le Portel, and had a breakout season in 2022–23, averaging almost seventeen points per game.

Hifi declared for the 2023 NBA draft, but would go undrafted.

=== Paris Basketball (2023–present) ===
Following the 2022–23 season, Hifi signed with Paris Basketball. On 29 November 2023, Hifi was named to the LNB All-Star Game.

On 8 April 2024, Hifi was named to the All-EuroCup Second Team after being fourth in the league in scoring with 16.3 points per game and second with three-pointers made going into the finals. On 12 May, Hifi was given a spot in the All-LNB Élite First Team.

On 15 April 2025, Hifi was voted best young player in the Euroleague.

During the 2025–26 season, Hifi averaged 20.1 points, 4.0 assists, and 2.7 rebounds. On 9 July 2026, he re–signed with Paris.

== Career statistics ==
Legend
GP	Games played	GS	Games started	MPG	Minutes per game
FG%	Field-goal percentage	3P%	3-point field-goal percentage	FT%	Free-throw percentage
RPG	Rebounds per game	APG	Assists per game	SPG	Steals per game
BPG	Blocks per game	PPG	Points per game	PIR	Performance index rating
**Bold**	Career high

=== EuroLeague ===
Year	Team	GP	GS	MPG	FG%	3P%	FT%	RPG	APG	SPG	BPG	PPG	PIR
2024–25	Paris Basketball	**38**	0	19.5	.402	.343	**.857**	2.1	1.3	.6	**.1**	15.1	10.6
2025–26	Paris Basketball	37	**19**	**22.1**	**.415**	**.351**	.842	**2.3**	**3.8**	.**9**	.0	**18.9**	**17.6**
Career		75	19	21.0	.409	.347	.848	2.2	2.5	.8	.1	17.0	14.0

=== EuroCup ===
Year	Team	GP	GS	MPG	FG%	3P%	FT%	RPG	APG	SPG	BPG	PPG	PIR
2023–24†	Paris Basketball	23	23	22.0	.460	.364	.921	1.7	2.4	.8	.0	16.6	12.7
Career		23	23	22.0	.460	.364	.921	1.7	2.4	.8	.0	16.6	12.7

=== Domestic leagues ===
Year	Team	League	GP	MPG	FG%	3P%	FT%	RPG	APG	SPG	BPG	PPG
2020–21	(France) Le Portel	LNB Élite	3	5.7	.250	.333	.000	.0	.0	.0	.0	2.0
2021–22	(France) Le Portel	LNB Élite	24	21.6	.449	.373	.739	1.5	2.3	.7	.0	6.8
2022–23	(France) Le Portel	LNB Élite	33	30.5	.465	.345	.841	2.7	3.4	1.3	.0	16.8
2023–24	(France) Paris Basketball	LNB Élite	46	21.7	.444	.380	.821	2.0	1.9	.8	.0	15.7
2024–25	(France) Paris Basketball	LNB Élite	40	23.1	.430	.374	.882	2.5	2.6	.9	.1	17.8
2025–26	(France) Paris Basketball	LNB Élite	39	22.1	.446	.360	.893	2.7	4.0	1.0	.1	20.1
