= Élie Okobo =

French basketball player (born 1997)

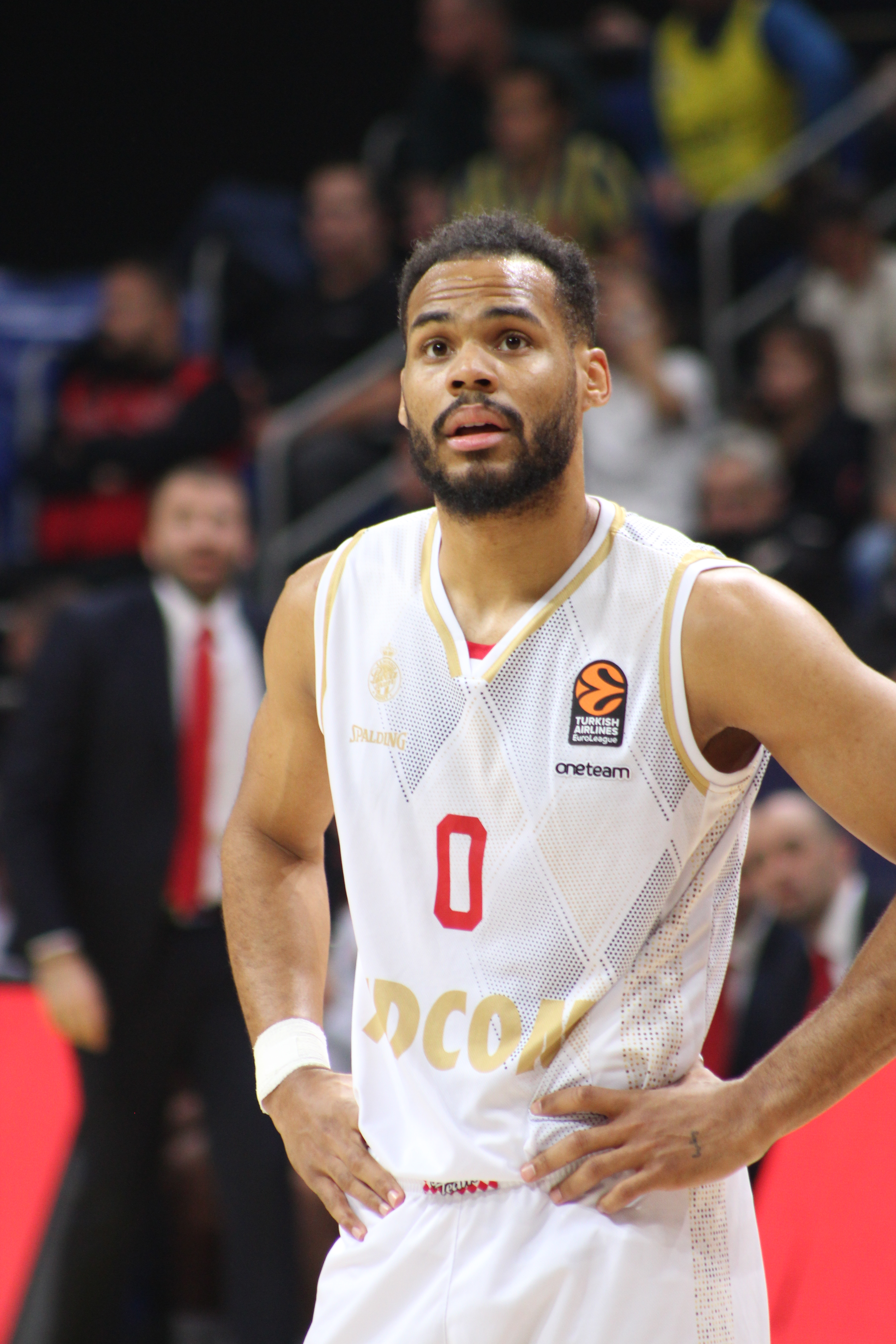
- Okobo with AS Monaco in 2024

No. 0 – Dubai Basketball
- Position: Point guard / shooting guard
- League: ABA League; EuroLeague

Personal information
- Born: 23 October 1997 (age 29) Bordeaux, France
- Listed height: 191 cm (6 ft 3 in)
- Listed weight: 86 kg (190 lb)

Career information
- NBA draft: 2018: 2nd round, 31st overall pick
- Drafted by: Phoenix Suns
- Playing career: 2015–present

Career history
- 2015–2018: Élan Béarnais
- 2018–2020: Phoenix Suns
- 2018–2019: →Northern Arizona Suns
- 2021: Long Island Nets
- 2021–2022: ASVEL
- 2022–2026: AS Monaco
- 2026–present: Dubai Basketball

Career highlights
- 4× LNB Élite champion (2022–2024, 2026); 2× French Cup winner (2023, 2026); French League Cup winner (2026); French Supercup winner (2025); LNB Élite MVP (2026); 2× LNB Élite Finals MVP (2022, 2026); All-LNB Élite First Team (2026); All-LNB Élite Second Team (2023); French League Cup MVP (2026); French Cup Final MVP (2023); LNB All-Star (2018)
- Stats at NBA.com
- Stats at Basketball Reference
Medals
Men's basketball
Representing France
EuroBasket
| Silver medal – second place | 2022 Czech Republic–Georgia–Italy–Germany |
FIBA Europe Under-20 Championship
| Bronze medal – third place | 2017 Greece | National team |

Élie-Franck Okobo (born 23 October 1997) is a French professional basketball player for Dubai Basketball of the ABA League and the EuroLeague. A 6 ft 3 in (1.91 m) tall combo guard, the Bordeaux native began his club career at age 16. Okobo subsequently competed for the youth team of Élan Béarnais Pau-Lacq-Orthez, reaching the LNB Espoirs title game in 2016. In the 2016–17 season, he assumed a greater role with the senior team, and in the following year, he became a regular starter.

Okobo has represented France at international competition on multiple occasions. He was a key player for the under-20 team at the FIBA Europe Under-20 Championship, which he took part in twice, winning a bronze medal in 2017. Okobo has also suited up for the senior national team at FIBA World Cup qualification. He has been considered one of the top international prospects, and at one point was considered a potential first-round selection, for the 2018 NBA draft. However, he was taken as the 31st overall pick in the second round by the Phoenix Suns that year.

== Early life and career ==
Okobo was born in Bordeaux, France to a Congolese father and French mother. He has one sister and two brothers: his older brother plays handball and competes in track and field, while his younger brother also plays basketball. In addition, Okobo's father has basketball experience as well.

At age 16, Okobo joined JSA Bordeaux Basket of the Nationale Masculine 1 (NM1), the amateur level third-tier division of French basketball. He made his senior men's club debut on February 8, 2014, shooting 0-of-1 from the field in one minute of playing time against Basket Club Montbrison. He scored his only points of the season, on March 8 versus JA Vichy-Clermont Métropole, with 2 points. In four contests, he averaged 0.5 points and 0.3 steals per game, in 2.2 minutes per game.

In the 2014–15 season, Okobo began playing for Espoirs Pau-Lacq-Orthez in the LNB Espoirs youth league. In his debut on September 20, 2014, he chipped in 23 points and 4 steals as his team lost to Espoirs Châlons-Reims. On December 23, he scored a season-high 24 points, shooting 6-of-7 from the three-point line, in a 79–78 win over Espoirs Nancy. After 29 games, Okobo averaged 9.8 points, 3.0 rebounds, 1.9 assists, and 1.2 steals per game.

== Professional career ==
=== Élan Béarnais (2015–2018) ===
==== Youth success (2015–16) ====
On June 13, 2016, Okobo signed a three-year contract with Élan Béarnais Pau-Lacq-Orthez of the LNB Pro A, the highest professional division of France. Through the 2015–16 season, he primarily played with Espoirs Pau-Lacq-Orthez in the youth league, seeing limited minutes for the senior team in the Pro A. On October 6, 2016, Okobo opened his second LNB Espoirs campaign by recording 17 points, 5 rebounds, and 8 assists in a 102–56 victory against Espoirs Monaco. He made his Pro A debut for Pau-Orthez on October 24, 2015, grabbing one rebound in a minute versus Paris-Levallois. On March 25, 2016, Okobo erupted for 34 points and 10 rebounds, both season-bests, in a youth league win over Espoirs Le Havre. In the following week against AS Monaco Basket, he scored 5 points—his first and only of the Pro A season. By the end of the season, Espoirs Pau-Lacq-Orthez had the best record in its league, at 29–5, but lost in the championship game to Espoirs Paris-Levallois. In the youth league season, Okobo averaged 15.5 points, 4.4 rebounds, 3.2 assists, and 2.2 steals per game.

==== Increased role (2016–17) ====
In the 2016–17 season, Okobo played sparingly in LNB Espoirs, instead receiving significant minutes off the bench for Pau-Orthez in the Pro A. On September 24, 2016, he made his season debut in the Pro A, recording 5 points, 2 rebounds, and 2 assists against Cholet Basket. In his second appearance of the LNB Espoirs season, Okobo posted a double-double of 21 points and 12 rebounds on October 15 versus Espoirs Gravelines-Dunkerque. On October 25, he debuted in the FIBA Europe Cup, the fourth-tier inter-continental European competition, notching 6 points and 2 rebounds in a win over Tartu. Later in the week, Okobo had another double-double in the LNB Espoirs, adding 18 points and 13 assists, along with 6 rebounds, against Espoirs Orleans. On November 28, he scored 11 points in a 96–76 loss for his first career double-digit scoring effort in the Pro A.

Okobo recorded a season-high 20 points, 6 rebounds, 10 assists, and 1 turnover in a 101–66 victory over JIP Pardubice in the second round of the FIBA Europe Cup on December 13. He had another notable performance on January 24, 2017, against Alba Fehérvár, scoring 10 points and hitting a game-winning three-pointer with under 10 seconds left to send his team to the FIBA Europe Cup Round of 16. He scored 8 points in the fourth quarter alone, with starting point guard D. J. Cooper being ejected in the final minutes of the game. On February 5, 2017, Okobo scored a season-best 15 points, with 5 rebounds and 4 assists, in a Pro A win over Élan Chalon. He closed the season averaging 4.6 points, 2.1 rebounds, and 1.5 assists per game in the Pro A, and 8.2 points, 3.3 rebounds, and 2.1 assists per game in the FIBA Europe Cup. Okobo was the runner-up for the LNB Pro A Best Young Player award, which was won by Frank Ntilikina of SIG Strasbourg.

==== Breakout season (2017–18) ====
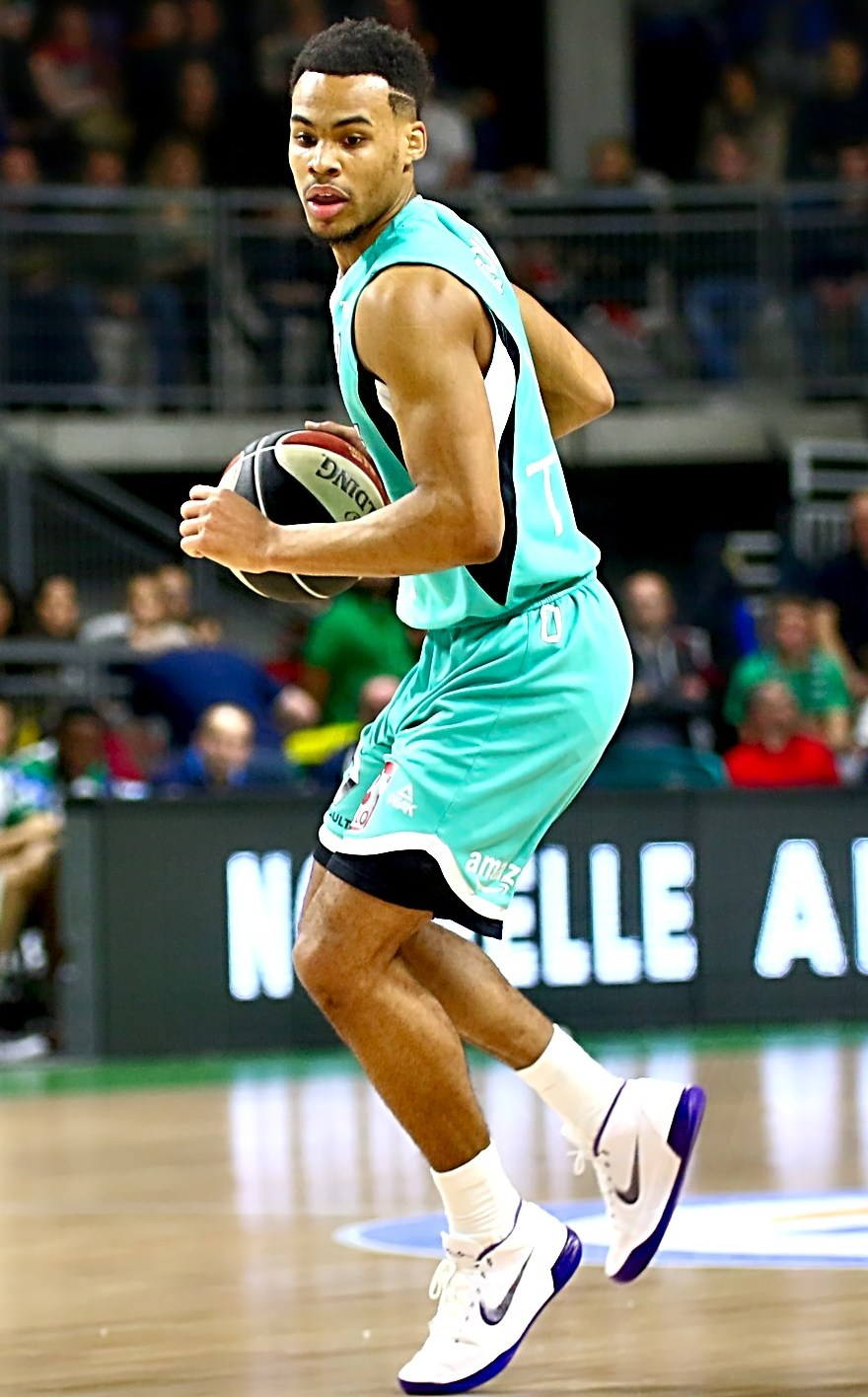
Okobo with Élan Béarnais in 2017

In his first game of the 2017–18 season, Okobo made his starting lineup debut in the Pro A on September 23, 2017, chipping in 14 points and 8 assists to help defeat Élan Chalon. On October 7, he led all scorers with 21 points and 3 steals against HTV Basket. Okobo had another notable performance on December 10, posting a team-high 23 points in a win over Levallois Metropolitans. He once again eclipsed the 20-point barrier on February 3, 2018, versus ASVEL Basket, scoring 24 points to lead Pau-Orthez to victory. On February 10, Okobo scored a career-high 30 points, along with 8 assists and 4 rebounds, in a 105–93 win over Élan Chalon. The performance earned him Player of the Week honors from the website Eurobasket.com. He announced plans to enter the 2018 NBA draft on April 11, saying, "I'm progressing every day and I see how I'm continuing to improve. I am very happy with the training I have received at Pau-Lacq-Orthez, and I know I will improve even more with NBA conditions and NBA training." At the time, ESPN considered him to be a possible first-round selection, and three weeks later, analyst David Aldridge projected him as a late first-round or early second-round prospect. With Pau-Orthez, Okobo reached the playoffs as the eight-seed. On May 23, during Game 1 of the series against first-seeded Monaco, Okobo scored a career-high 44 points in a 99–97 loss. That game would help Okobo's draft stock rise from a likely second round pick to a potential mid-first round selection. At the June 11 international draft day deadline, Okobo would be one of only 11 truly international prospects to remain in the 2018 NBA Draft. Okobo would later be taken as the 31st pick by the Phoenix Suns ten days later.

=== Phoenix Suns (2018–2020) ===
On June 21, 2018, Okobo was drafted with the 31st pick in the 2018 NBA draft by the Phoenix Suns. It was around this time that the franchise's general manager, Ryan McDonough, mentioned that Okobo would be playing with the official, 15-man roster for the team this season. Three days after the draft, it was reported the Okobo would agree to a four-year deal worth $6 million, with his third and fourth years being team options. Okobo would then be announced as a player for the Suns' 2018 NBA Summer League squad. He would officially sign the aforementioned deal on July 6. In his NBA debut on October 17, Okobo recorded two points and an assist in a 121–100 win over the Mavericks. On October 28, Okobo recorded 18 points, 5 rebounds and 7 assists in a 117–110 loss to the Oklahoma City Thunder. Three days later, Okobo made his first start in the NBA, recording eight points, four rebounds, and five assists in 28 minutes of action in a 120–90 loss to the San Antonio Spurs. On November 13, 2018, Okobo was assigned to the Northern Arizona Suns, playing for the team the same night in a loss against the Santa Cruz Warriors, and continued to play with both Phoenix and Northern Arizona throughout 2018. His highest scoring game in his rookie season occurred on November 28, scoring 19 points in a 115–99 loss to the Los Angeles Clippers. On February 2, 2019, Okobo recorded a season-high 11 assists in a 118–112 loss against the Atlanta Hawks. Okobo was later assigned to Northern Arizona once again on March 14, returning to Phoenix just a day later. He was waived by the Suns on November 25, 2020.

On December 16, 2020, Okobo was signed by the Brooklyn Nets. He was waived at the conclusion of training camp.

=== Long Island Nets (2021) ===
On January 27, 2021, Okobo was included in the roster of the Long Island Nets. Over 14 games with Long Island Nets, he averaged 8.9 points, 5 assists and 3.4 rebounds per game.

=== ASVEL (2021–2022) ===
On July 10, 2021, Okobo signed a one-year deal with French powerhouse ASVEL of the LNB Pro A and the EuroLeague. On February 2, 2022, he was ruled out for six weeks after undergoing surgery on a shoulder cyst.

Okobo helped ASVEL win its 21st LNB Pro A championship and was named the Finals MVP, after helping the team defeat Monaco 3–2 in the league Finals. He scored 20 points, 7 rebounds and 9 assists in the decisive Game 5 overtime win.

=== AS Monaco (2022–2026) ===
On July 15, 2022, he signed with AS Monaco of the LNB Pro A. On April 22, 2023, Okobo won the French Basketball Cup with Monaco, the first in the team's history. He was named the Cup Final MVP after he had 20 points, 6 rebounds and 7 assists in the final against his former team ASVEL.

In the 2024–25 EuroLeague, Okobo and Monaco advanced to the final of the Final Four, becoming the first French team in 32 years to reach the European final. In the final, however, Monaco lost to Fenerbahçe to finish as runners-up. In May 2026, Okobo was named the LNB Élite MVP for the 2025–26 season.

=== Dubai Basketball (2026–present) ===
On July 17, 2026, Okobo signed with Dubai Basketball of the ABA League and the EuroLeague.

== National team career ==
Okobo was a member of the French under-20 national basketball team, making his first international appearance at the 2016 FIBA Europe Under-20 Championship in Finland. He had his best performance of the event on July 23, 2017, notching 23 points, 7 rebounds, and 4 steals in a 74–60 victory over Finland. He was the third-leading scorer at the tournament, averaging 18.9 points, 3.9 rebounds, 1.6 assists, and 1.9 steals per game, shooting .429 from the three-point line. He also played with France's Under-20 junior national team, at the 2017 FIBA Europe Under-20 Championship, where he won a bronze medal. He averaged 12.3 points, 3.3 rebounds, and 4.0 assists per game at the tournament. He represented France at EuroBasket 2025, leading the French team with 5.0 assists per game to the round of 16.

== Career statistics ==
Legend
| GP | Games played | GS | Games started | MPG | Minutes per game |
| FG% | Field-goal percentage | 3P% | 3-point field-goal percentage | FT% | Free-throw percentage |
| RPG | Rebounds per game | APG | Assists per game | SPG | Steals per game |
| BPG | Blocks per game | PPG | Points per game | PIR | Performance index rating |
| **Bold** | Career high |

=== NBA ===
==== Regular season ====
| Year | Team | GP | GS | MPG | FG% | 3P% | FT% | RPG | APG | SPG | BPG | PPG |
|---|---|---|---|---|---|---|---|---|---|---|---|---|
| 2018–19 | Phoenix | 53 | **16** | **18.1** | .393 | .295 | **.787** | **1.8** | **2.4** | **.6** | **.1** | **5.7** |
| 2019–20 | Phoenix | **55** | 3 | 13.1 | **.398** | **.352** | .704 | 1.6 | 2.1 | .4 | **.1** | 4.0 |
| Career | | 108 | 19 | 15.5 | .395 | .315 | .737 | 1.7 | 2.2 | .5 | .1 | 4.8 |

=== EuroLeague ===
| * | Led the league |

| Year | Team | GP | GS | MPG | FG% | 3P% | FT% | RPG | APG | SPG | BPG | PPG | PIR |
|---|---|---|---|---|---|---|---|---|---|---|---|---|---|
| 2021–22 | ASVEL | 27 | **23** | **27.6** | **.462** | .368 | .827 | **2.8** | 3.9 | .7 | .1 | **14.5** | **13.5** |
| 2022–23 | Monaco | **41*** | 6 | 26.0 | .443 | .335 | .838 | 2.1 | 3.6 | 1.0 | **.2** | 12.6 | 12.0 |
| 2023–24 | Monaco | 37 | 3 | 24.8 | .413 | .301 | .828 | 2.6 | 3.1 | .7 | .0 | 11.0 | 10.2 |
| 2024–25 | Monaco | 35 | 9 | 25.2 | **.462** | **.393** | **.878** | 1.9 | **4.1** | **1.1** | .0 | 12.5 | 12.6 |
| Career | | 140 | 41 | 25.4 | .456 | .346 | .843 | 2.3 | 3.7 | .9 | .1 | 12.5 | 12.1 |

=== FIBA Europe Cup ===
| Year | Team | GP | GS | MPG | FG% | 3P% | FT% | RPG | APG | SPG | BPG | PPG |
|---|---|---|---|---|---|---|---|---|---|---|---|---|
| 2016–17 | Élan Béarnais | 11 | 3 | 20.8 | .431 | .324 | .800 | 3.3 | 2.1 | .4 | .4 | 8.2 |
| Career | | 11 | 3 | 20.8 | .431 | .324 | .800 | 3.3 | 2.1 | .4 | .4 | 8.2 |

=== Domestic leagues ===
| Year | Team | League | GP | MPG | FG% | 3P% | FT% | RPG | APG | SPG | BPG | PPG |
|---|---|---|---|---|---|---|---|---|---|---|---|---|
| 2013–14 | (France) JSA Bordeaux | NM1 | 3 | 3.3 | .250 | .000 | — | — | — | .3 | — | 0.7 |
| 2015–16 | (France) Élan Béarnais | Pro A | 8 | 3.0 | .200 | .167 | — | .6 | .1 | .1 | — | 0.6 |
| 2016–17 | (France) Élan Béarnais | Pro A | 20 | 13.4 | .434 | .357 | .846 | 2.0 | 1.5 | .6 | .1 | 4.6 |
| 2017–18 | (France) Élan Béarnais | Pro A | 36 | 26.5 | .489 | .418 | .835 | 2.7 | 4.7 | .9 | .2 | 13.8 |
| 2018–19 | (United States) N.A. Suns | G League | 9 | 35.8 | .389 | .294 | .743 | 4.7 | 7.4 | 1.3 | .3 | 18.1 |
| 2020–21 | (United States) Long Island Nets | G League | 14 | 27.2 | .384 | .304 | .563 | 3.4 | 5.1 | 1.2 | .1 | 8.9 |
| 2021–22 | (France) ASVEL | LNB Élite | 37 | 24.8 | .466 | .322 | .883 | 3.9 | 3.8 | .9 | .0 | 14.6 |
| 2022–23 | (France) Monaco | LNB Élite | 37 | 24.2 | .482 | .382 | .857 | 2.3 | 4.4 | 1.3 | .1 | 12.7 |
| 2023–24 | (France) Monaco | LNB Élite | 39 | 23.8 | .518 | .403 | .829 | 2.6 | 4.7 | .7 | .2 | 13.8 |
| 2024–25 | (France) Monaco | LNB Élite | 39 | 25.0 | .423 | .277 | .872 | 2.8 | 4.9 | .6 | .3 | 11.5 |
| 2025–26 | (France) Monaco | LNB Élite | 35 | 26.8 | .578 | .483 | .871 | 2.5 | 5.4 | 1.0 | .1 | 17.1 |
