= Bastien Vautier =

French basketball player (born 1998)

- Vautier with Bilbao in 2026

No. 34 – Bilbao Basket
- Position: Center
- League: Liga ACB

Personal information
- Born: November 15, 1998 (age 27) Noisy-le-Sec, France
- Listed height: 2.10 m (6 ft 11 in)
- Listed weight: 110 kg (243 lb)

Career information
- NBA draft: 2020: undrafted
- Playing career: 2016–present

Career history
- 2016–2021: SLUC Nancy
- 2017–2018: →Caen Basket Calvados
- 2021–2022: Béliers de Kemper
- 2022–2023: Lille Métropole BC
- 2023–2024: ESSM Le Portel
- 2024–2025: Cholet
- 2025–2026: ASVEL Basket
- 2026–present: Bilbao

Career highlights
- All-LNB Élite First Team (2024); All-LNB Élite Second Team (2025)

Bastien Vautier (born November 15, 1998) is a French professional basketball player for Bilbao Basket of the Spanish Liga ACB. Standing at a height of 2.10 m (6 ft 10 1/2 in), Vautier plays at the center position.

== Early life and youth career ==
Born in Noisy-le-Sec, a suburb of Paris, Vautier practiced football, tennis and other sports before focusing on basketball at 13 years old. He played in Rozay-en-Brie and Marne-la-Vallée before joining the youth ranks of SLUC Nancy Basket at 16.

== Professional career ==
Vautier made his professional debut with SLUC Nancy Basket in the 2016–17 Pro A. The next season, he was loaned out to Caen Basket Calvados in the Pro B. He would be recalled by Nancy at the end of the season to take part in the 2018 Pro B playoffs. In April 2021, he suffered an ACL injury which would sideline him for an extended period.

In January 2022, 9 months after his injury, Vautier signed for Béliers de Kemper in the Pro B until the end of the season. In June 2022, he signed with Lille Métropole, also playing in the Pro B. Reaching the promotion playoffs with Lille, Vautier was between the three nominees to the season MVP award of the 2022–23 Pro B.

In May 2023, he signed with ESSM Le Portel of the LNB Élite. Vautier's performances with Le Portel during the 2023–24 season earned him a spot on the All-LNB first team.

=== Cholet Basket (2024–2025) ===
On June 6, 2024, Vautier signed with Cholet Basket, signing a two season deal with the LNB Élite, Europe Cup and BCL team. One of his best performances with Cholet came during a Europe Cup win against Antwerp Giants, in which Vautier scored 29 points. He was selected MVP for the month of October in the 2024–25 FIBA Europe Cup. Reaching the playoffs with Cholet, he was selected to the All-LNB second team at the end of the season.

=== LDLC ASVEL (2025–2026) ===
On July 3, 2025, ASVEL Basket of the French LNB Élite and the EuroLeague announced Vautier as a new player, signing a two-year deal. During the 2025–26 EuroLeague, he was the Round 18 MVP scoring 29 points and recording a PIR of 31 in a home win against Anadolu Efes.

=== Bilbao Basket (2026–present) ===
On July 3, 2025, Vautier signed with Bilbao Basket of the Liga ACB on a one-season contract.

== Career statistics ==
Legend
GP	Games played	GS	Games started	MPG	Minutes per game
FG%	Field goal percentage	3P%	3-point field goal percentage	FT%	Free throw percentage
RPG	Rebounds per game	APG	Assists per game	SPG	Steals per game
BPG	Blocks per game	PPG	Points per game	**Bold**	Career high

=== Europe Cup ===
Year	Team	League	GP	MPG	FG%	3P%	FT%	RPG	APG	SPG	BPG	PPG
2024–25	Cholet	14	14	19.5	.646	—	.673	5.8	1.6	.9	.5	12.9
Career		14	14	19.5	.646	—	.673	5.8	1.6	.9	.5	12.9

=== Domestic leagues ===
Year	Team	League	GP	MPG	FG%	3P%	FT%	RPG	APG	SPG	BPG	PPG
2023–24	(France) Le Portel	LNB	32	24.0	.707	.0	.759	5.6	1.9	.6	.7	14.8
2024–25	(France) Cholet	LNB	24	20.3	.641	.0	.683	4.9	2.4	.5	.3	11.3
