= 2024–25 French Basketball Cup =

- Season: 2024–25
- Duration: 23 September 2024 – 26 April 2025
- Teams: 64

Finals
- Champions: Paris Basketball
- Runners-up: Le Mans

Awards
- Final MVP: (France) Nadir Hifi

The 2024–25 French Basketball Cup season (French: 2024–25 Coupe de France de Basket) was the 48th season of the domestic cup competition of French basketball.The previous winner of the cup was JDA Dijon. The competition started on 23 September 2024 and ended 26 April 2025. Paris Basketball won the competition.

== Bracket ==
Round of 16
Élan Béarnais	78
Paris Basketball	107
JDA Dijon	91
Le Portel	82
ASA	81
Chorale Roanne Basket	68
Poitiers Basket 86	89
JL Bourg	94
ADA Blois	84
AS Monaco	99
Saint-Quentin Basket	54
ASVEL	76
Tours Métropole Basket	72
Le Mans	94
Nanterre 92	84
Cholet Basket	97

Quarterfinals
Paris Basketball	93
JDA Dijon	78
ASA	64
JL Bourg	65
AS Monaco	83
ASVEL	70
Le Mans	101
Cholet Basket	82

Semifinals
Paris Basketball	99
JL Bourg	91
AS Monaco	99
Le Mans	102

Final
Paris Basketball	91
Le Mans	80

== Final ==
26 April 2025	Le Mans	80–91	Paris Basketball	Paris
18:15 (CET)	Scoring by quarter: 26–28, 16–20, 12–21, 26–22
	Pts: Hudgins 22; Rebs: Penda 6 DiLeo 6 Asts: Buchanan 3 Yeguete 3	Boxscore	Pts: Hifi 20; Rebs: Malcolm 6 Asts: Shorts 7	Arena: Accor Arena

== See also ==
- 2024–25 Pro A season
