= Nelly Junior Joseph =

Nigerian basketball player (born 2001)

- Junior Joseph with in 2026

No. 23 – AEK Athens
- Position: Center / power forward
- League: GBL

Personal information
- Born: November 20, 2001 (age 24) Lagos, Nigeria
- Listed height: 6 ft 9 in (2.06 m)
- Listed weight: 240 lb (109 kg)

Career information
- College: Iona (2020–2023); New Mexico (2023–2025)
- NBA draft: 2025: undrafted
- Playing career: 2025–present

Career history
- 2025–2026: SIG Strasbourg
- 2026–present: AEK Athens

Career highlights
- All-LNB Élite Second Team (2026); LNB Élite rebounding leader (2026); 2× First-team All-MAAC (2022, 2023); MAAC Rookie of the Year (2021)

Nelly Junior Joseph (born November 20, 2001) is a Nigerian professional basketball player for AEK Athens of the Greek Basketball League (GBL). He previously played for the Iona Gaels, Metro Atlantic Athletic Conference (MAAC) and New Mexico Lobos of the Mountain West Conference.

== Early life ==
Junior Joseph grew up in Benin City, Nigeria and was friends with future NBA player Charles Bassey. At the age of 13, a local coach noticed his height and suggested he play basketball. Junior Joseph initially declined, as he wanted to focus on soccer, but was able to dunk after two weeks of practice. He attended high school for a year in Japan. Former NBA player Olumide Oyedeji informed NBA Academy Africa director Roland Houston about Junior Joseph, and he joined the academy after impressing Houston at a tryout. Junior Joseph played at the academy for two years and occasionally competed against NBA players such as Gorgui Dieng. Junior Joseph initially committed to playing college basketball for Wichita State, but received a late offer from Iona coach Rick Pitino, and he switched his commitment to the Gaels.

== College career ==
Due to the COVID-19 pandemic, embassies in Africa were closed, and Junior Joseph was unable to secure a visa to the United States. He was eventually able to reach Iona on October 29, 2020, shortly before the season started. Junior Joseph averaged 11.1 points and 7.5 rebounds per game as a freshman. He was named MAAC Freshman of the Week four times, and earned MAAC Freshman of the Year honors at the conclusion of the regular season. On November 13, 2021, Junior Joseph scored a career-high 28 points in a 90–87 overtime win against Harvard. Junior Joseph averaged 13 points and 8.2 rebounds per game as a sophomore. He was named to the First Team All-MAAC. As a junior, Junior Joseph averaged 14.9 points and 9.3 rebounds per game, repeating on the First Team All-MAAC. After coach Rick Pitino left the team to coach St. John's, Junior Joseph transferred to New Mexico to play for Pitino's son Richard. Junior Joseph averaged 8.8 points and 8.1 rebounds per game for the Lobos, helping the team reach the NCAA Tournament.

== Professional career ==
=== SIG Strasbourg (2025–2026) ===
On July 23, 2025, he signed with SIG Strasbourg of the French LNB Pro A. He was named the LNB Pro A rebounding leader of the 2025–26 LNB Élite season.

=== AEK Athens (2026–present) ===
On June 28, 2026, he moved to AEK Athens of the Greek Basketball League.

== Career statistics ==
Legend
GP	Games played	GS	Games started	MPG	Minutes per game
FG%	Field goal percentage	3P%	3-point field goal percentage	FT%	Free throw percentage
RPG	Rebounds per game	APG	Assists per game	SPG	Steals per game
BPG	Blocks per game	PPG	Points per game	**Bold**	Career high

=== College ===
Year	Team	GP	GS	MPG	FG%	3P%	FT%	RPG	APG	SPG	BPG	PPG
2020–21	Iona	18	16	27.7	.596	.000	.638	7.5	1.3	.6	1.6	11.1
