= 2025–26 LNB Élite season =

French professional basketball season

2025–26 LNB Élite season^{1}
- Season: 2025–26
- Dates: 26 September 2025 – 16 May 2026 (regular season)
- Teams: 16

Regular season
- Top seed: Paris Basketball
- Season MVP: (France) Élie Okobo (Monaco)
- Relegated: ESSM Le Portel

Finals
- Champions: AS Monaco 3rd title
- Runners-up: Paris Basketball
- Semi-finalists: Cholet; Nanterre 92
- Finals MVP: (France) Élie Okobo (Monaco)

Statistical leaders
Points	(France) Nadir Hifi (Paris)	20.4
Rebounds	(Nigeria) Nelly Joseph (Strasbourg)	9.0
Assists	(United States) Marcus Keene (Strasbourg)	6.4
- ^{1} Sponsored league name, referring to Betclic.

The 2025–26 LNB Élite season, also known as Betclic Élite for sponsorship reasons, was the 104th season of the LNB Élite, France's top basketball league. It began on 26 September 2025 with the regular season and concluded in June 2026 with the playoffs.

Paris Basketball were the defending champions.

== Teams ==
A total of 16 teams participate in the league, including 15 teams from the 2024–25 season and one promoted from the Élite 2. Boulazac was promoted after winning the 2024–25 Élite 2 championship, while Stade Rochelais was relegated to the Élite 2 after being promoted the previous season.

=== Promotion and relegation (pre-season) ===
▲ Promoted from Élite 2	▼ Relegated to Élite 2
Boulazac	Stade Rochelais

=== Venues and locations ===
Location of teams in 2025–26 LNB Élite

Team	Home city	Arena	Capacity
AS Monaco	Fontvieille, Monaco	Salle Gaston Médecin	5,000
BCM Gravelines-Dunkerque	Gravelines–Dunkirk	Stade des Flandres	2,500
Boulazac	Boulazac	Le Palio	5,200
Cholet	Cholet	La Meilleraie	5,191
Élan Chalon	Chalon-sur-Saône	Le Colisée	4,540
ESSM Le Portel	Le Portel	Le Chaudron	3,500
JDA Dijon	Dijon	Palais des Sports J.M. Geoffroy	5,000
JL Bourg	Bourg-en-Bresse	Ekinox	3,548
LDLC ASVEL	Lyon–Villeurbanne	Astroballe	5,556
Le Mans Sarthe	Le Mans	Antarès	6,023
Limoges CSP	Limoges	Palais des Sports de Beaublanc	6,506
Nanterre 92	Nanterre	Palais des Sports Maurice Thorez	3,000
Paris Basketball	Paris	Adidas Arena	8,000
Saint-Quentin	Saint-Quentin, Aisne	Palais des Sports Pierre Ratte	3,800
SIG Strasbourg	Strasbourg	Rhénus Sport	6,200
SLUC Nancy	Nancy	Palais des Sports Jean Weille	6,027

== Regular season ==
=== League table ===
Pos	Team	Pld	W	L	PF	PA	PD	PCT	Qualification or relegation
1	Paris Basketball	30	22	8	2973	2577	+396	.733	Qualification to playoffs
2	AS Monaco (Note: Monaco was deducted a victory due to the non-payment of a luxury tax.)	29	22	7	2830	2622	+208	.759	Qualification to playoffs
3	Nanterre 92	30	21	9	2599	2431	+168	.700	Qualification to playoffs
4	LDLC ASVEL	30	20	10	2625	2399	+226	.667	Qualification to playoffs
5	Cholet	30	19	11	2631	2514	+117	.633	Qualification to playoffs
6	Le Mans Sarthe	30	19	11	2705	2567	+138	.633	Qualification to playoffs
7	JL Bourg	30	18	12	2622	2515	+107	.600	Qualification to play-in
8	SIG Strasbourg	30	17	13	2596	2596	0	.567	Qualification to play-in
9	Élan Chalon	30	16	14	2597	2554	+43	.533	Qualification to play-in
10	SLUC Nancy	30	13	17	2571	2607	−36	.433	Qualification to play-in
11	JDA Dijon	30	12	18	2704	2721	−17	.400	
12	Boulazac	30	12	18	2474	2524	−50	.400	
13	Limoges CSP	30	11	19	2506	2651	−145	.367	
14	BCM Gravelines-Dunkerque	30	8	22	2478	2709	−231	.267	
15	Saint-Quentin	30	8	22	2426	2596	−170	.267	Qualification to relegation playoffs
16	ESSM Le Portel (Note: Le Portel was deducted a victory due to presenting false or inaccurate financial records.)	29	0	29	2174	2928	−754	.000	Relegation to Élite 2

Updated to match(es) played on 16 May 2026. Source: LNB.fr

=== Results ===
Home \ Away	ASV	BOU	CHA	CHO	DIJ	GRA	JLB	LIM	MON	MSB	NAN	NTR	PAB	POR	STQ	STR
ASVEL	—	94–77	85–86	85–87	85–80	88–79	91–77	90–73	98–102	91–66	115–71	64–77	93–98	104–58	86–70	89–81
Boulazac	72–67	—	94–90	68–77	79–78	97–67	68–82	92–80	92–74	86–97	65–87	84–95	73–94	94–64	94–76	95–76
Élan Chalon	87–89	90–74	—	87–77	90–74	86–81	100–84	109–56	78–92	71–89	93–84	78–86	67–107	93–58	84–82	69–75
Cholet	93–85	92–81	98–77	—	111–74	91–85	102–96	91–88	72–95	80–84	94–91	76–78	93–99	105–58	93–80	92–74
JDA Dijon	99–90	103–85	94–91	76–64	—	109–83	101–83	86–101	86–99	89–91	90–75	88–97	76–92	102–82	119–127	95–89
Gravelines	62–83	91–92	86–78	97–98	93–85	—	75–84	79–84	77–89	83–96	107–79	80–85	66–109	100–78	91–75	81–87
JL Bourg	81–79	73–70	82–80	87–93	101–81		—	92–71	104–81	98–86	89–77	86–83	75–91	109–79	71–89	77–80
Limoges	65–81	80–72	95–83	70–78	80–76	93–64	96–84	—	77–94	83–110	97–79	90–87	80–86	74–79	80–62	82–86
AS Monaco	83–87	92–85	99–104	89–79	108–95	101–82	89–91	99–88	—	99–85	86–94	105–98	95–123	113–86	92–84	88–74
Le Mans	88–91	108–94	87–93	89–94	92–86	87–66	84–82	101–84	84–93	—	102–74	79–71	95–89	107–68	90–74	72–84
Nancy	82–88	83–72	102–80	91–87	96–94	88–93	80–88	117–85	79–93	76–78	—	84–91	97–90	95–50	84–71	82–86
Nanterre 92	73–76	85–78	88–82	66–79	87–69	101–79	101–93	91–89	76–81	98–88	86–72	—	99–83	81–74	80–75	102–88
Paris	87–76	87–103	103–105	107–84	97–92	109–115	85–95	115–93	94–99	110–92	102–73	96–92	—	110–80	99–69	96–67
Le Portel	88–98	68–75	78–87	84–94	80–126	87–92	63–92	83–105	63–84	72–94	85–97	59–90	57–120	—	72–108	65–102
Saint-Quentin	76–81	88–81	65–86	77–68	77–83	86–74	75–88	77–86	73–98	85–88	72–84	65–89	90–103	97–81	—	109–87
Strasbourg	81–96	86–82	90–91	94–89	96–98	89–72	87–83	100–82	114–118	103–96	86–82	84–74	86–92	80–75	84–72	—

Source: LNB.fr
Legend: Blue = home team win; Red = away team win.
Matches with lighter background shading were decided after overtime.

== Play-in ==
Under the current format, the 7th to 10th-ranked teams faced each other in the play-in. Each game is hosted by the team with the higher regular season record. The format was similar to the first two rounds of the Page–McIntyre system for a four-team playoff that was identical to that of the NBA play-in tournament. First, the 7th seed will host the 8th seed, with the winner advancing to the playoffs as the 7th seed; likewise the 9th seed will host the 10th seed, with the loser eliminated. Then the loser of the 7-v-8 game will host the winner of the 9-v-10 game, with the winner of that game getting the final playoff spot, as the 8th seed.

Play-in games
7	JL Bourg	91
8	SIG Strasbourg	71
9	Élan Chalon	91
10	SLUC Nancy	75

No. 8 seed game
8	SIG Strasbourg	102
9	Élan Chalon	81

Final seeds
JL Bourg	No. 7 seed
SIG Strasbourg	No. 8 seed

== Playoffs ==
Quarterfinals will be played best-of-three format (1–1–1), semifinals and finals will be played in a best-of-five format (2–2–1).

=== Bracket ===
Quarterfinals
1	Paris Basketball	2
8	SIG Strasbourg	1
4	ASVEL Basket	1
5	Cholet	2
2	AS Monaco	2
7	JL Bourg	0
3	Nanterre 92	2
6	Le Mans Sarthe	0

Semifinals
1	Paris Basketball	3
5	Cholet	1
2	AS Monaco	3
3	Nanterre 92	1

Finals
1	Paris Basketball	2
2	AS Monaco	3

=== Quarterfinals ===
Team 1	Series	Team 2	Game 1	Game 2	Game 3
Paris Basketball	2–1	SIG Strasbourg	95–64	82–87	89–75
LDLC ASVEL	1–2	Cholet	75–67	65–77	75–80
AS Monaco	2–0	JL Bourg	81–75	114–103	—
Nanterre 92	2–0	Le Mans Sarthe	90–74	64–55	—

=== Semifinals ===
Team 1	Series	Team 2	Game 1	Game 2	Game 3	Game 4	Game 5
Paris Basketball	3–1	Cholet	89–90	100–77	95–86	94–91	—
AS Monaco	3–1	Nanterre 92	103–88	89–98	83–61	89–78	—

=== Finals ===
Team 1	Series	Team 2	Game 1	Game 2	Game 3	Game 4	Game 5
Paris Basketball	2–3	AS Monaco	95—91	90—102	88—77	84—96	92—101

=== Game 1 ===
14 June 2026	Paris Basketball	95–91	AS Monaco	Paris
17:00 (CET)	Scoring by quarter: 22—28, 29—24, 16—24, 28—15
	Pts: Hifi 23; Rebs: Shahrvin 8 Asts: three players 3	Boxscore	Pts: Diallo 21; Rebs: Diallo 8 Asts: Strazel 9	Arena: Adidas Arena

=== Game 2 ===
17 June 2026	Paris Basketball	90–102	AS Monaco	Paris
20:30 (CET)	Scoring by quarter: 15—28, 26—25, 25—24, 24—25
	Pts: Hifi 20; Rebs: Faye 6 Asts: Hifi 8	Boxscore	Pts: Diallo, Strazel 22; Rebs: Begarin 6 Asts: Strazel 9	Arena: Adidas Arena

=== Game 3 ===
19 June 2026	AS Monaco	77–88	Paris Basketball	Monaco
21:00 (CET)	Scoring by quarter: 26—17, 18—23, 17—18, 16—30
	Pts: Okobo 15; Rebs: four players 4 Asts: Okobo, Strazel 3	Boxscore	Pts: Stevens 24; Rebs: Cavalière, Shahrvin 9 Asts: Hifi 6	Arena: Salle Gaston Médecin

=== Game 4 ===
21 June 2026	AS Monaco	96–84	Paris Basketball	Monaco
18:00 (CET)	Scoring by quarter: 27—16, 27—17, 29—22, 13—29
	Pts: Strazel 20; Rebs: Diallo, Strazel 5 Asts: Strazel 9	Boxscore	Pts: Hifi 20; Rebs: Cavalière 7 Asts: Robinson 4	Arena: Salle Gaston Médecin

=== Game 5 ===
23 June 2026	Paris Basketball	92–101	AS Monaco	Paris
21:10 (CET)	Scoring by quarter: 24—27, 28—28, 29—18, 11—28
	Pts: Robinson 12; Rebs: Faye 7 Asts: Robinson 5	Boxscore	Pts: Blossomgame 27; Rebs: Begarin 9 Asts: Okobo 15	Arena: Adidas Arena

== Individual awards ==
Award	Winner	Club	Ref.
MVP	Élie Okobo	Monaco	
Finals MVP	Élie Okobo	Monaco	
Best Young Player	Hugo Yimga-Moukouri	Nanterre 92	
Best Coach	Julien Mahé	Nanterre 92	
Most Improved Player	Gérald Ayayi	Cholet	
Best Defender	Alpha Diallo	Monaco	
Best Scorer	Nadir Hifi	Paris Basketball	
Best Passer	Marcus Keene	Strasbourg	
Best Rebounder	Nelly Joseph	Strasbourg	
Best Blocker	Lucas Dufeal	Le Mans	

=== Best Five of the Season ===
Pos.	First Team		Second Team	
Pos.	Player	Team	Player	Team
G	(France) Nadir Hifi	Paris Basketball	(United States) Marcus Keene	Strasbourg
G	(France) Élie Okobo	Monaco	(United States) Trevor Hudgins	Le Mans
F	(France) Gérald Ayayi	Cholet	(France) Adam Mokoka	JL Bourg
F	(United States) Landers Nolley II	Nancy	(Nigeria) Nelly Joseph	Strasbourg
C	(France) Mathis Dossou-Yovo	Nanterre 92	(Guinea) Alpha Diallo	Monaco

== French clubs in European competitions ==
Team	Competition	Progress
Monaco	EuroLeague	Playoffs
LDLC ASVEL	EuroLeague	Regular Season
Paris Basketball	EuroLeague	Regular Season
JL Bourg	EuroCup	Champion
Élan Chalon	Champions League	Round of 16
Cholet Basket	Champions League	Play-ins
Le Mans	Champions League	Round of 16
JDA Dijon	FIBA Europe Cup	Regular Season
