= 2025 Match des Champions =

Le Mans	AS Monaco
79	104
- Date: 20–21 September 2025
- Venue: Stade Roland Garros - Court Central Philippe Chatrier, Paris
- MVP: (United States) Mike James

The 2025 Match des Champions was the 13th edition of the Match des Champions and the 1st after 8 years of absence. This year for the first time, a Final four format was introduced to determine the champion.

AS Monaco beat Le Mans 79–104. Mike James was named the games Most Valuable Player.

== Format ==
The competition will be played in a final-four format and single elimination games, between the previous season champions of the LNB Élite, French Basketball Cup, Leaders Cup and Élite 2.

=== Qualified teams ===
The following four teams qualified for the tournament.

Team	Method of qualification	Appearance	Previous appearances
Paris Basketball	2024–25 LNB Élite Champion, 2024–25 French Basketball Cup Winner	1st	None
Le Mans	2025 Pro A Leaders Cup Winner	4th	2006, 2009, 2016
AS Monaco	2024–25 LNB Élite Runners-Up	1st	None
Boulazac	2024–25 Élite 2 Champion	1st	None

== Bracket ==
Semifinals; 20 September 2025
Boulazac	70
AS Monaco	95
Le Mans	90
Paris Basketball	87

Finals; 21 September 2025
AS Monaco	104
Le Mans	79
Third place
Boulazac	96
Paris Basketball	80

== Final ==
21 September 2025	Le Mans	79–104	AS Monaco Basket	Stade Roland Garros - Court Central Philippe Chatrier, Paris
17:00 (CET)	Scoring by quarter: 16–30, 16–17, 23–31, 24–26
	Pts: Bogues 24; Rebs: Bogues 6 Asts: Hudgins 4	Boxscore	Pts: James 18; Rebs: Hayes 7 Asts: Okobo, Diallo 7
