= 2023–24 LNB Élite season =

French basketball league season

- Association: Ligue Nationale de Basket (LNB)
- League: LNB Élite
- Sport: Basketball
- Duration: 16 September 2023 – 11 May 2024 (regular season)
- Teams: 18

Regular season
- Season champions: Monaco 2nd title
- Runners-up: Paris
- Top seed: Monaco
- Season MVP: T. J. Shorts (Paris)
- Top scorer: T. J. Shorts (Paris)
- Relegated: Metropolitans 92; Roanne; Blois

Playoffs

Seasons
- ← 2022–23 2024–25 →

The 2023–24 LNB Élite season, known as Betclic Élite due to sponsorship from online gambling company Betclic, was the 102nd season of the LNB Élite, the top basketball league in France organised by the Ligue Nationale de Basket (LNB).

The regular season began on 16 September 2023 and ended on 11 May 2024. Via promotion and relegation with LNB Pro B, Saint-Quentin BB and Élan Chalon joined the league, replacing Élan Béarnais and Fos Provence Basket.

In the 2023–24 season, clubs ranked 16th, 17th, and 18th were relegated to LNB Pro B.

== Teams ==
Location of teams in the 2023-24 Pro A season

=== Locations and arenas ===
Team	Home city	Stadium	Capacity
AS Monaco	Fontvieille, Monaco	Salle Gaston Médecin	5,000
ASVEL	Lyon–Villeurbanne	Astroballe	5,556
BCM Gravelines-Dunkerque	Gravelines	Sportica	3,500
Blois	Blois	Jeu de Paume	2,525
Cholet	Cholet	La Meilleraie	5,191
Élan Sportif Chalonnais	Chalon-sur-Saône	Le Colisée	5,000
ESSM Le Portel	Le Portel	Le Chaudron	3,500
JDA Dijon	Dijon	Palais des Sports de Dijon	5,000
JL Bourg	Bourg-en-Bresse	Ekinox	3,548
Le Mans Sarthe	Le Mans	Antarès	6,003
Limoges CSP	Limoges	Beaublanc	6,000
Metropolitans 92	Levallois	Palais des Sports Marcel Cerdan	4,000
Nanterre 92	Nanterre	Palais des Sports de Nanterre	3,000
Paris Basketball	Paris	Adidas Arena	8,000
Roanne	Roanne	Halle André Vacheresse	5,000
Saint-Quentin BB	Saint-Quentin	Palais des Sports Pierre Ratte	3,800
SIG Strasbourg	Strasbourg	Rhénus Sport	6,200
SLUC Nancy	Nancy	Palais des Sports Jean Weille	6,027

== Regular season ==
=== League table ===
Pos	Team	Pld	W	L	PF	PA	PD	Qualification or relegation
1	Monaco	34	29	5	2914	2535	+379	Advance to playoffs
2	Paris Basketball	34	27	7	2952	2531	+421	Advance to playoffs
3	LDLC ASVEL	34	25	9	2866	2621	+245	Advance to playoffs
4	JL Bourg	34	25	9	2876	2565	+311	Advance to playoffs
5	Nanterre 92	34	20	14	2832	2835	−3	Advance to playoffs
6	Saint-Quentin BB	34	17	17	2591	2546	+45	Advance to playoffs
7	Cholet	34	17	17	2710	2712	−2	Advance to playoffs
8	ESSM Le Portel	34	17	17	2730	2863	−133	Advance to playoffs
9	JDA Dijon	34	16	18	2655	2547	+108	
10	Nancy	34	16	18	2689	2829	−140	
11	Le Mans Sarthe	34	15	19	2749	2802	−53	
12	SIG Strasbourg	34	15	19	2643	2709	−66	
13	Limoges CSP	32	14	18	2667	2757	−90	
14	Élan Chalon	34	14	20	2755	2867	−112	
15	BCM Gravelines	34	12	22	2534	2622	−88	
16	Blois	34	11	23	2737	2905	−168	Relegation to Pro B
17	Roanne	34	10	24	2750	2969	−219	Relegation to Pro B
18	Metropolitans 92	34	4	30	2674	3109	−435	Relegation to Pro B

Source: LNB.fr
Rules for classification: 1) points; 2) Head-to-head; 3) Points difference; 4) Points scored.

=== Results ===
Home \ Away	ASV	BLO	CHA	CHO	DIJ	GRA	JLB	LIM	MON	MET	MSB	NAN	NTR	PAB	POR	ROA	STQ	STR
LDLC ASVEL	—	85–77	79–72	100–95	79–74	86–83	84–61	77–66	79–87	102–76	89–75	89–64	100–76	66–86	85–70	93–88	79–77	91–72
Blois	72–98	—	92–95	78–80	85–84	81–73	102–93	75–73	73–89	95–84	78–80	99–98	78–89	88–92	71–80	77–80	60–75	68–73
Élan Chalon	88–87	93–75	—	79–81	76–84	79–63	62–89	80–78	68–104	86–92	73–68	70–74	89–97	73–84	94–65	105–86	97–90	101–91
Cholet	69–73	71–80	84–77	—	79–88	72–84	78–88	71–67	69–75	112–83	111–96	67–76	70–67	70–77	89–82	90–86	73–69	78–90
JDA Dijon	71–73	81–63	73–66	60–62	—	90–69	66–84	90–60	72–80	94–54	87–77	88–73	82–84	72–80	92–80	99–82	77–69	80–68
BCM Gravelines-Dunkerque	74–79	82–73	81–83	66–59	71–55	—	64–75	79–83	68–72	106–76	71–84	83–76	80–79	66–77	77–83	82–67	69–78	67–56
JL Bourg	74–80	81–66	90–67	78–80	66–60	90–82	—	77–67	74–70	94–73	86–67	103–78	85–67	83–81	106–74	81–84	86–71	77–74
Limoges CSP	79–68	86–78	107–88	81–90	93–77	88–63	86–90	—	59–72	98–88	79–78	102–99	79–68	65–83	73–76	80–77	83–80	73–80
AS Monaco	89–71	99–81	82–69	66–79	88–74	91–76	78–67	94–56	—	84–72	78–74	86–100	91–82	84–62	101–67	116–73	77–75	92–78
Metropolitans 92	79–103	81–87	75–83	78–92	82–77	72–74	82–101	67–90	77–85	—	88–100	80–89	80–90	77–93	62–78	90–83	69–73	85–107
Le Mans Sarthe	87–100	110–96	98–72	85–88	76–67	78–68	64–80	101–75	84–95	110–96	—	98–66	76–89	55–88	73–67	90–80	76–77	86–78
SLUC Nancy	58–83	93–96	92–83	77–85	66–56	69–59	59–85	67–75	94–86	85–69	68–60	—	91–71	81–78	76–91	84–79	69–77	79–75
Nanterre 92	85–81	103–106	83–72	91–87	67–87	78–75	105–98	113–77	80–86	94–86	93–81	89–88	—	67–98	109–88	83–77	80–75	76–68
Paris Basketball	92–86	72–65	85–70	92–90	81–64	97–78	84–80	101–77	85–92	93–86	112–71	113–71	102–68	—	86–90	90–61	87–65	78–67
ESSM Le Portel	66–101	94–89	99–96	87–84	81–75	91–82	66–99	76–66	67–74	104–79	85–76	88–93	72–84	66–80	—	91–76	85–76	96–77
Roanne	66–69	83–81	82–93	82–69	92–105	69–78	87–111	79–76	92–99	105–93	70–71	107–80	72–86	83–76	84–83	—	90–96	82–98
Saint-Quentin	91–71	75–64	75–70	75–60	77–73	68–76	92–61	75–83	71–69	68–82	81–64	71–78	87–82	65–81	88–67	57–64	—	86–66
SIG Strasbourg	82–80	80–88	82–86	79–76	64–81	68–65	65–83	80–87	67–83	74–61	71–80	88–78	71–57	89–86	90–75	97–82	78–66	—

Legend: Blue = home team win; Red = away team win.
Matches with lighter background shading were decided after overtime.

== Playoffs ==
The top 8 teams will advance to the playoffs when the 2023-2024 season ends on 11 May, 2024. The quarter-finals will be played in a best-of-three format, while the semi-finals and finals were played in a best-of-five format.

Quarterfinals
1	Monaco	2
8	ESSM Le Portel	0
4	JL Bourg	2
5	Nanterre 92	1
2	Paris Basketball	2
7	Cholet	1
3	LDLC ASVEL	2
6	Saint-Quentin BB	0

Semifinals
1	Monaco	3
4	JL Bourg	1
2	Paris Basketball	3
3	LDLC ASVEL	2

Finals
1	Monaco	3
2	Paris Basketball	1

=== Quarterfinals ===
Team 1	Series	Team 2	Game 1	Game 2	Game 3
Monaco	2–0	ESSM Le Portel	85–78	101–70	
JL Bourg	2–1	Nanterre 92	92–82	84–90	90–74
Paris Basketball	2–1	Cholet	81–91	90–72	74–62
LDLC ASVEL	2–0	Saint-Quentin BB	91–75	92–89	

=== Semifinals ===
Team 1	Series	Team 2	Game 1	Game 2	Game 3	Game 4	Game 5
Monaco	3–1	JL Bourg	85–72	73–83	85–81	76–71	
Paris Basketball	3–2	LDLC ASVEL	94–81	85–89	77–86	103–98	98–92

=== Finals ===
Team 1	Series	Team 2	Game 1	Game 2	Game 3	Game 4	Game 5
Monaco	3–1	Paris Basketball	90–80	70–77	88–59	115–76	

=== Game 1 ===
4 June 2024	Monaco	90–80	Paris Basketball
18:30 (CET)	Scoring by quarter: 23–18, 23–12, 27–23, 17–27
	Pts: James 31; Rebs: Hall 10; Asts: James 3 Okobo 3 Strazel 3	Boxscore	Pts: Hifi 18; Shorts 17; Rebs: Shorts 7 Asts: Shorts 6	Arena: Salle Gaston Medecin

=== Game 2 ===
6 June 2024	Monaco	70–77	Paris Basketball
18:30 (CET)	Scoring by quarter: 11–25, 25–13, 15–17, 19–22
	Pts: Okobo 15; Rebs: Hall 7 Cornelie 6 Asts: Okobo 6	Boxscore	Pts: Hifi 24; Shorts 21; Rebs: Shahrvin 10; Asts: Shorts 4	Arena: Salle Gaston Medecin

=== Game 3 ===
9 June 2024	Paris Basketball	59–88	Monaco
18:30 (CET)	Scoring by quarter: 14–28, 21–18, 10–18, 14–24
	Pts: Hifi 15; Rebs: Ward 6 Asts: Hifi 4	Boxscore	Pts: Okobo 20; Rebs: Hall 8 Okobo 7 Asts: Okobo 5	Arena: Adidas Arena

=== Game 4 ===
12 June 2024	Paris Basketball	76–115	Monaco
21:05 (CET)	Scoring by quarter: 18–37, 19–26, 18–30, 21–22
	Pts: Jantunen 12; Malcolm 12; Shorts 12; Rebs: Simon 5 Asts: Shorts 6	Boxscore	Pts: James 27; Okobo 23; Rebs: Hall 7 Asts: James 4 Okobo 4	Arena: Adidas Arena

== Individual awards ==
The annual LNB Awards were handed out on 13 May 2024 in Paris.

Award	Winner	Club
MVP	T. J. Shorts	Paris Basketball
Finals MVP	Mike James	Monaco
Best Young Player	Zaccharie Risacher	JL Bourg
Best Coach	Tuomas Iisalo	Paris Basketball
Best Defender	John Brown	Monaco
Best Scorer	T. J. Shorts	Paris Basketball
Best Blocker	Ibrahima Fall Faye	Nanterre 92

=== Best Five of the Season ===
Pos.	First Team		Second Team	
Pos.	Player	Team	Player	Team
G	(North Macedonia) T. J. Shorts	Paris Basketball	(United States) D. J. Cooper	Chorale Roanne
G	(United States) Mike James	Monaco	(United States) Justin Bibbins	Nanterre 92
F	(France) Nadir Hifi	Paris Basketball	(France) Élie Okobo	Monaco
F	(Canada) Isiaha Mike	JL Bourg	(Jamaica) Shevon Thompson	Nancy
C	(France) Bastien Vautier	ESSM Le Portel	(France) Youssoupha Fall	LDLC ASVEL

== French clubs in European competitions ==
Team	Competition	Progress
Monaco	EuroLeague	Playoffs
LDLC ASVEL	EuroLeague	Regular Season
JL Bourg	EuroCup	Runners-up
Paris Basketball	EuroCup	Champions
JDA Dijon	Champions League	Round of 16
Le Mans	Champions League	Play-ins
Cholet Basket	Champions League	Round of 16
SIG Strasbourg	Champions League	Round of 16
BCM Gravelines-Dunkerque	FIBA Europe Cup	Second round
