= 2025–26 French Basketball Cup =

- Season: 2025–26
- Duration: 12 September 2025 – 25 April 2026
- Teams: 64

Finals
- Champions: AS Monaco
- Runners-up: Le Mans

Awards
- Final MVP: (France) Matthew Strazel

The 2025–26 French Basketball Cup season (French: 2025–26 Coupe de France de Basket) was the 49th season of the domestic cup competition of French basketball.The previous winner of the cup was Paris Basketball. The competition started on 12 September 2025 and ended 25 April 2026. AS Monaco won the competition.

== Bracket ==
Round of 16
Hyères-Toulon | 112
JDA Dijon | 110
Tours Métropole | 84
Élan Chalon | 100
Stade Rochelais | 101
Le Mans | 108
SIG Strasbourg | 93
Cholet Basket | 85
ADA Blois | 83
JL Bourg | 78
Antibes Sharks | 70
Nanterre 92 | 97
ASVEL | 99
Saint-Quentin | 74
AS Monaco | 109
Paris Basketball | 103

Quarterfinals
Hyères-Toulon | 116
Élan Chalon | 112
Le Mans | 88
SIG Strasbourg | 74
ADA Blois | 80
Nanterre 92 | 109
ASVEL | 95
AS Monaco | 98

Semifinals
Hyères-Toulon | 73
Le Mans | 82
Nanterre 92 | 83
AS Monaco | 88

Final
Le Mans | 83
AS Monaco | 87

== Final ==
| 25 April 2026 | Le Mans | 83–87 | AS Monaco | Paris |
| 18:30 (CET) | Scoring by quarter: 19–21, 10–24, 28–19, 26–23 |
| | Pts: Hudgins 22; Rebs: Thomas 12; Asts: Yeguete 4 | Boxscore | Pts: Diallo 21; Rebs: Theis 7 Asts: Strazel 9 | Arena: Accor Arena |

== See also ==
- 2025–26 LNB Élite season
