= 2026 Pro A Leaders Cup =

- Season: 2025–26
- Duration: 20–22 February 2026
- Games played: 7
- Teams: 8

Regular season
- Season MVP: (France) Elie Okobo

Finals
- Champions: AS Monaco (4th title)
- Runners-up: Le Mans

The 2026 LNB Pro A Leaders Cup season was the 28th edition of this tournament, the eleventh since it was renamed as Leaders Cup. The event included the eight top teams from the first half of the 2025–26 Pro A regular season and was played in Chasseneuil-du-Poitou. AS Monaco won their fourth title after beating Le Mans in the Final.

== Bracket ==
Quarterfinals
ASVEL	82
Cholet Basket	93
AS Monaco	90
SIG Strasbourg	89
Nanterre 92	67
Le Mans	82
Paris Basketball	74
JL Bourg	78

Semifinals
Cholet Basket	83
AS Monaco	115
Le Mans	79
JL Bourg	77

Final
AS Monaco	103
Le Mans	79

== Final ==
February 22, 2026	AS Monaco	103–79	Le Mans	Arena Futuroscope, Chasseneuil-du-Poitou
19:00 (CET)	Scoring by quarter: 30-12, 23-28, 23-18, 27-21
	Pts: Okobo 19; Rebs: Theis 9 Asts: James 9	Boxscore	Pts: Berhanemeskel 22; Rebs: Doumbia 6 Asts: Hudgins 8
