= 2024–25 LNB Élite season =

French professional basketball season

2024–25 LNB Élite season^{1}
- Season: 2024–25
- Dates: 20 September 2024 – 17 May 2025 (regular season)
- Teams: 16

Regular season
- Top seed: Paris Basketball
- Season MVP: (North Macedonia) T. J. Shorts (Paris)
- Relegated: Stade Rochelais

Finals
- Champions: Paris Basketball 1st title
- Runners-up: AS Monaco
- Semi-finalists: JL Bourg; LDLC ASVEL
- Finals MVP: (North Macedonia) T. J. Shorts (Paris)

Statistical leaders
Points	(France) Nadir Hifi (Paris)	18.2
Rebounds	(Poland) Dominik Olejniczak (Saint-Quentin)	7.3
Assists	(North Macedonia) T. J. Shorts (Paris)	7.9
- ^{1} Sponsored league name, referring to Betclic.

The 2024–25 LNB Élite season, also known as Betclic Élite for sponsorship reasons, was the 103rd season of the LNB Élite, France's top basketball league. It began on 20 September 2024 with the regular season and concluded on 24 June 2025 with the playoffs.

AS Monaco were the back-to-back defending champions.

== Format changes ==
For this season, the league was reduced from 18 to 16 teams. After the regular season, the play-in will be introduced in which the teams that finish between 7th and 10th will play for the last two playoffs spots like other European leagues. On the other hand, the 15th team from regular season will join to Pro B promotion playoffs to avoid relegation to the latter league.

== Teams ==
A total of 16 teams participate in the league, including 15 teams from the 2023–24 season and one promoted from the Pro B. Stade Rochelais (which will debut in the French top flight) was promoted after winning promotion playoffs, while ADA Blois, Chorale Roanne and Metropolitans 92 (relegated after two, five and 15 years in the French top flight, respectively) were relegated to Pro B, though the last team would further relegate themselves downward into the Nationale Masculine 1 instead due to bankruptcy issues that occurred after their demotion.

=== Promotion and relegation (pre-season) ===
▲ Promoted from Pro B	▼ Relegated to Pro B
Stade Rochelais	ADA Blois; Chorale Roanne; Metropolitans 92

=== Venues and locations ===
Location of teams in 2024–25 LNB Élite

Team	Home city	Arena	Capacity
AS Monaco	Fontvieille, Monaco	Salle Gaston Médecin	5,000
BCM Gravelines-Dunkerque	Gravelines–Dunkirk	Stade des Flandres	2,500
Cholet	Cholet	La Meilleraie	5,191
Élan Chalon	Chalon-sur-Saône	Le Colisée	4,540
ESSM Le Portel	Le Portel	Le Chaudron	3,500
JDA Dijon	Dijon	Palais des Sports J.M. Geoffroy	5,000
JL Bourg	Bourg-en-Bresse	Ekinox	3,548
LDLC ASVEL	Lyon–Villeurbanne	Astroballe	5,556
Le Mans Sarthe	Le Mans	Antarès	6,023
Limoges CSP	Limoges	Palais des Sports de Beaublanc	6,506
Nanterre 92	Nanterre	Palais des Sports Maurice Thorez	3,000
Paris Basketball	Paris	Adidas Arena	8,000
Saint-Quentin	Saint-Quentin, Aisne	Palais des Sports Pierre Ratte	3,800
SIG Strasbourg	Strasbourg	Rhénus Sport	6,200
SLUC Nancy	Nancy	Palais des Sports Jean Weille	6,027
Stade Rochelais	La Rochelle	Salle Gaston-Neveur	1,994

== Regular season ==
=== League table ===
Pos	Team	Pld	W	L	PF	PA	PD	PCT	Qualification or relegation
1	Paris Basketball	30	23	7	2847	2547	+300	.767	Qualification to playoffs
2	LDLC ASVEL	30	23	7	2676	2464	+212	.767	Qualification to playoffs
3	AS Monaco	30	23	7	2610	2297	+313	.767	Qualification to playoffs
4	Cholet	30	21	9	2551	2441	+110	.700	Qualification to playoffs
5	JL Bourg	30	18	12	2685	2489	+196	.600	Qualification to playoffs
6	Le Mans Sarthe	30	18	12	2639	2513	+126	.600	Qualification to playoffs
7	Élan Chalon	30	15	15	2610	2579	+31	.500	Qualification to play-in
8	JDA Dijon	30	15	15	2533	2532	+1	.500	Qualification to play-in
9	SLUC Nancy	30	14	16	2544	2660	−116	.467	Qualification to play-in
10	Saint-Quentin	30	13	17	2316	2373	−57	.433	Qualification to play-in
11	BCM Gravelines-Dunkerque	30	12	18	2421	2516	−95	.400	
12	SIG Strasbourg	30	12	18	2382	2502	−120	.400	
13	Nanterre 92	30	11	19	2478	2588	−110	.367	
14	Limoges CSP	30	10	20	2397	2583	−186	.333	
15	ESSM Le Portel	30	8	22	2222	2490	−268	.267	Qualification to relegation playoffs
16	Stade Rochelais	30	4	26	2171	2508	−337	.133	Relegation to Pro B

Updated to match(es) played on 18 May 2025. Source: LNB.fr

=== Results ===
Home \ Away	ASV	CHA	CHO	DIJ	GRA	JLB	LIM	MON	MSB	NAN	NTR	PAB	POR	ROC	STQ	STR
LDLC ASVEL	—	116–95	87–101	84–83	90–83	89–80	84–69	88–71	85–71	92–82	109–103	98–92	88–67	105–75	81–75	95–70
Élan Chalon	109–107	—	105–72	86–93	77–67	86–93	92–76	90–65	88–84	103–73	107–84	87–102	106–76	65–62	91–63	86–78
Cholet	75–94	88–74	—	95–89	106–74	67–102	96–86	84–95	86–92	95–74	88–78	90–80	80–65	83–77	82–59	105–75
JDA Dijon	92–71	87–94	67–93	—	93–77	97–95	89–83	77–78	76–74	93–84	65–66	83–97	90–82	88–95	85–91	91–94
BCM Gravelines-Dunkerque	60–81	78–71	70–73	83–84	—	75–83	70–56	74–83	91–85	84–87	83–89	89–85	104–80	94–68	91–75	78–72
JL Bourg	85–94	103–77	86–89	88–91	94–84	—	74–70	94–109	94–87	81–93	100–97	91–98	98–69	87–67	96–85	89–96
Limoges CSP	84–81	74–68	69–75	87–73	110–122	63–87	—	84–96	92–90	97–89	90–87	71–78	77–98	83–62	74–70	80–87
AS Monaco	86–94	109–82	89–72	76–74	90–59	73–100	91–52	—	74–86	117–96	89–74	94–63	78–56	82–62	86–72	77–65
Le Mans Sarthe	97–80	112–86	91–68	98–71	83–78	96–92	101–77	74–81	—	85–96	94–87	84–76	77–74	81–71	69–83	90–70
SLUC Nancy	85–91	96–84	71–78	85–104	80–63	84–79	90–86	77–98	97–89	—	96–81	86–105	85–78	64–56	83–74	74–80
Nanterre 92	74–88	91–70	97–104	72–77	93–80	61–86	96–87	73–81	67–85	97–75	—	78–92	74–65	63–76	95–102	76–75
Paris Basketball	111–96	100–97	90–77	95–96	109–66	98–89	96–88	111–104	106–103	115–97	102–86	—	109–65	84–75	86–88	106–74
ESSM Le Portel	74–77	87–81	87–80	74–86	69–82	65–94	79–89	67–91	92–75	76–85	90–70	78–87	—	83–62	56–58	67–65
Stade Rochelais	75–79	77–86	64–78	92–90	76–88	78–86	80–86	48–86	98–100	79–88	77–98	73–90	96–73	—	57–94	71–78
Saint-Quentin	63–77	83–87	71–77	85–72	83–86	81–83	72–67	68–66	89–91	104–96	67–76	65–97	71–54	75–59	—	81–70
SIG Strasbourg	77–75	83–80	83–94	58–77	91–88	70–76	110–90	81–95	88–95	96–76	88–95	79–87	75–76	71–63	83–69	—

Source: LNB.fr
Legend: Blue = home team win; Red = away team win.
Matches with lighter background shading were decided after overtime.

== Play-in ==
Under the new format, the 7th to 10th-ranked teams faced each other in the play-in. Each game is hosted by the team with the higher regular season record. The format was similar to the first two rounds of the Page–McIntyre system for a four-team playoff that was identical to that of the NBA play-in tournament. First, the 7th seed will host the 8th seed, with the winner advancing to the playoffs as the 7th seed; likewise the 9th seed will host the 10th seed, with the loser eliminated. Then the loser of the 7-v-8 game will host the winner of the 9-v-10 game, with the winner of that game getting the final playoff spot, as the 8th seed.

Play-in games
7	Élan Chalon	106
8	JDA Dijon	85
9	SLUC Nancy	81
10	Saint-Quentin	88

No. 8 seed game
8	JDA Dijon	92
10	Saint-Quentin	79

Final seeds
Élan Chalon	No. 7 seed
JDA Dijon	No. 8 seed

== Playoffs ==
Quarterfinals will be played best-of-three format (1–1–1), semifinals and finals will be played in a best-of-five format (2–2–1).

=== Bracket ===
Quarterfinals
1	Paris Basketball	2
8	JDA Dijon	1
4	Cholet	0
5	JL Bourg	2
2	LDLC ASVEL	2
7	Élan Chalon	1
3	AS Monaco	2
6	Le Mans Sarthe	1

Semifinals
1	Paris Basketball	3
5	JL Bourg	0
2	LDLC ASVEL	1
3	AS Monaco	3

Finals
1	Paris Basketball	3
3	AS Monaco	2

=== Quarterfinals ===
Team 1	Series	Team 2	Game 1	Game 2	Game 3
Paris Basketball	2–1	JDA Dijon	100–87	79–80	114–88
Cholet	0–2	JL Bourg	71–95	89–94	—
LDLC ASVEL	2–1	Élan Chalon	100–96	69–76	99–75
AS Monaco	2–1	Le Mans Sarthe	76–69	87–88	85–76

=== Semifinals ===
Team 1	Series	Team 2	Game 1	Game 2	Game 3	Game 4	Game 5
Paris Basketball	3–0	JL Bourg	100–89	117–103	103–93	—	—
LDLC ASVEL	1–3	AS Monaco	94–74	77–94	64–74	86–91	—

=== Finals ===
Team 1	Series	Team 2	Game 1	Game 2	Game 3	Game 4	Game 5
Paris Basketball	3–2	AS Monaco	94–82	92–67	78–81	74–80	99–93

=== Game 1 ===
15 June 2025	Paris Basketball	94–82	Monaco	Paris
16:30 (CET)	Scoring by quarter: 22–23, 27–15, 25–23, 20–21
	Pts: Shorts 30; Rebs: Hayes 7 Asts: Shorts 6	Boxscore	Pts: Jaiteh 17; Rebs: Jaiteh 9 Asts: Okobo 9	Arena: Adidas Arena

=== Game 2 ===
17 June 2025	Paris Basketball	92–67	Monaco	Paris
20:30 (CET)	Scoring by quarter: 20–13, 21–15, 29–17, 22–22
	Pts: Shorts 28; Rebs: Hayes, Ward 7 Asts: Hifi, Shorts 5	Boxscore	Pts: Jaiteh 14; Rebs: Jaiteh 7 Asts: Okobo 4	Arena: Adidas Arena

=== Game 3 ===
20 June 2025	Monaco	81–78	Paris Basketball	Monaco
20:30 (CET)	Scoring by quarter: 12–23, 21–22, 30–15, 18–18
	Pts: Blossomgame 26; Rebs: Jaiteh 5 Asts: Okobo 10	Boxscore	Pts: Shorts 20; Rebs: Jantunen 9 Asts: Shorts 6	Arena: Salle Gaston Médecin

=== Game 4 ===
22 June 2025	Monaco	80–74	Paris Basketball	Monaco
16:30 (CET)	Scoring by quarter: 20–16, 20–27, 15–13, 25–18
	Pts: Strazel 20; Rebs: Tarpey 10; Asts: Calathes 4	Boxscore	Pts: Shorts 13; Rebs: Hayes, Sy 6 Asts: Shorts 6	Arena: Salle Gaston Médecin

=== Game 5 ===
24 June 2025	Paris Basketball	99–93	Monaco	Paris
20:30 (CET)	Scoring by quarter: 29–21, 25–29, 19–31, 26–12
	Pts: Shorts 27; Rebs: Shorts 7 Ward 7 Asts: Shorts 10	Boxscore	Pts: Diallo 18; Rebs: Tarpey 7 Asts: Strazel 4	Arena: Adidas Arena

== Individual awards ==
The annual LNB Awards were handed out on 17 May 2025 in Paris.

Award	Winner	Club
MVP	T. J. Shorts	Paris Basketball
Finals MVP	T. J. Shorts	Paris Basketball
Best Young Player	Noah Penda	Le Mans Sarthe
Best Coach	Fabrice Lefrançois	Cholet
Most Improved Player	Clément Frisch	Nancy
Best Defender	Alpha Diallo	Monaco
Best Scorer	Nadir Hifi	Paris Basketball
Best Passer	T. J. Shorts	Paris Basketball
Best Rebounder	Dominik Olejniczak	Saint-Quentin
Best Blocker	Georgios Papagiannis	Monaco

=== Best Five of the Season ===
Pos.	First Team		Second Team	
Pos.	Player	Team	Player	Team
G	(North Macedonia) T. J. Shorts	Paris Basketball	(United States) André Roberson	LDLC ASVEL
G	(United States) Mike James	Monaco	(United States) Trevor Hudgins	Le Mans Sarthe
F	(France) Théo Maledon	LDLC ASVEL	(France) Nadir Hifi	Paris Basketball
F	(Guinea) Alpha Diallo	Monaco	(United States) Jaron Blossomgame	Monaco
C	(Jamaica) Shevon Thompson	Nancy	(France) Bastien Vautier	Cholet

== French clubs in European competitions ==
Team	Competition	Progress
Monaco	EuroLeague	Runners-up
LDLC ASVEL	EuroLeague	Regular Season
Paris Basketball	EuroLeague	Playoffs
JL Bourg	EuroCup	Regular Season
Nanterre 92	Champions League	Playoffs
Saint-Quentin	Champions League	Play-ins
Cholet Basket	Champions League	Qualifying rounds
Cholet Basket	FIBA Europe Cup	Semifinals
ESSM Le Portel	FIBA Europe Cup	Second round
JDA Dijon	FIBA Europe Cup	Semifinals
