= ESSM Le Portel =

- Leagues: Élite 2
- Founded: 1931; 95 years ago
- History: ESSM Le Portel (1931–present)
- Arena: Le Chaudron
- Capacity: 3,500
- Location: Le Portel, France
- Team colors: Green, Dark Grey, White
- Head coach: Kenny Grant
- Website: essm-basket.fr
Home	Away

Étoile Sportive Saint-Michel Le Portel Côte d'Opale, commonly known as ESSM Le Portel or simply Le Portel, is a professional basketball team based in Le Portel, France. The team currently plays in the Élite 2, the second tier in France, following their relegation from LNB Élite at the end of the 2025–26 season.

== History ==
In the 2014–15 season, ESSM had a historic run to the Coupe de France Final. They beat Pro A teams Le Mans, Le Havre, ASVEL and reigning French champion Limoges CSP to qualify for their first cup final ever. In the Final they lost 74–87 to SIG Strasbourg.

In the 2015–16 season, Le Portel won the Pro B play-offs which gained the team promotion to the LNB Pro A. In the first Pro A season of the club, they reached the playoffs after they captured the eight-seed. In the following 2017–18 season, Le Portel made its European debut in the FIBA Europe Cup. In this competition, the team reached the quarter-finals, where it lost to Bakken Bears.

== Arenas ==
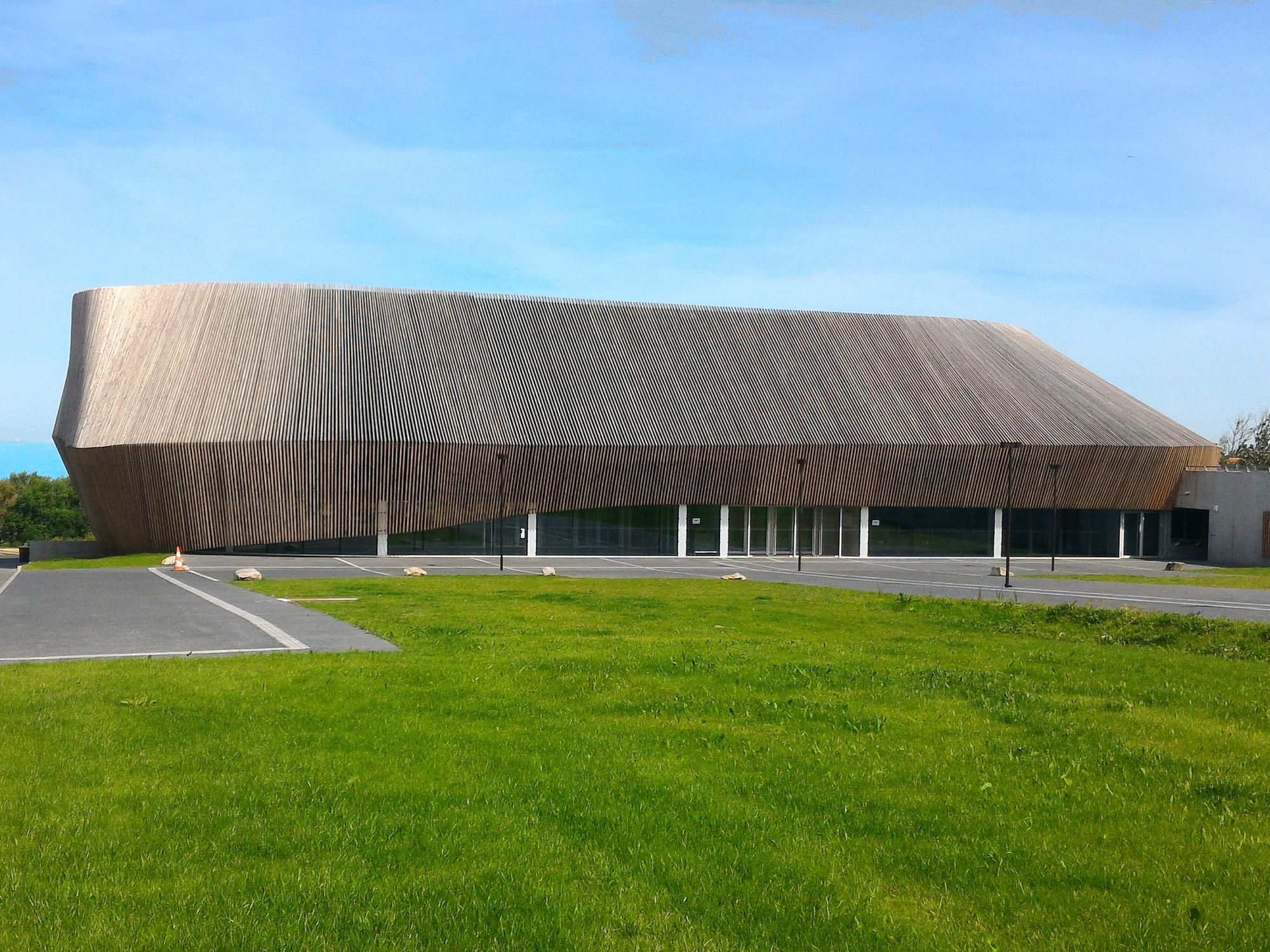
Le Chaudron, the home arena of ESSM since 2015

- Georges Carpentier (2003–2007)
- Salle Damrémont (2007–2013)
- Lycée Giraux-Sannier (2013–2015)
- Le Chaudron (2015–present)

== Honours ==
- Coupe de France:
  - Runners-up (1): 2014–15

== European record ==
Season	Competition	Round	Club	Home	Away
2017–18	FIBA Europe Cup	QR2	(Israel) Bnei Herzliya	74–55	74–74
2017–18	FIBA Europe Cup	RS	(Netherlands) Donar	60–49	77–72
2017–18	FIBA Europe Cup	RS	(Bosnia and Herzegovina) Bosna	101–51	66–86
2017–18	FIBA Europe Cup	RS	(Belgium) Antwerp Giants	94–79	70–73
2017–18	FIBA Europe Cup	SR	(Turkey) İstanbul BB	86–49	80–83
2017–18	FIBA Europe Cup	SR	(Russia) Nizhny Novgorod	79–72	57–76
2017–18	FIBA Europe Cup	SR	(Finland) Kataja	90–68	77–82
2017–18	FIBA Europe Cup	R16	(Italy) Dinamo Sassari	100–81	72–55
2017–18	FIBA Europe Cup	QF	(Denmark) Bakken Bears	86–80	76–62
2024–25	FIBA Europe Cup	RS	(Estonia) Kalev/Cramo	54–77	63–66
2024–25	FIBA Europe Cup	RS	(Hungary) Alba Fehérvár	104–73	104–80
2024–25	FIBA Europe Cup	RS	(Bulgaria) Rilski Sportist	74–60	80–60
2024–25	FIBA Europe Cup	SR	(France) Cholet	60–92	82–85
2024–25	FIBA Europe Cup	SR	(Spain) Surne Bilbao Basket	74–78	65–74
2024–25	FIBA Europe Cup	SR	(Italy) Banco di Sardegna Sassari	83–76	70–80

== Season by season ==
Former logo of the team (2007–2015)

Season	Tier	League	Pos.	W–L	French Cup	European competitions		
2013–14	2	Pro B	5th		Round of 32			
2014–15	2	Pro B	9th		Runner-up			
2015–16	2	Pro B	2nd		Round of 32			
2016–17	1	Pro A	8th	19–17	Quarterfinalist			
2017–18	1	Pro A	11th	16–18	Round of 16	4 FIBA Europe Cup	QF	14–1–3
2018–19	1	Pro A	16th	10–24	Round of 16			
2019–20	1	Pro A	18th^{1}	4–20^{1}	Round of 64			
2020–21	1	Pro A	13th	13–21	Round of 32			
2021–22	1	Pro A	14th	13–21	Round of 64			
2022–23	1	Pro A	12th	15–19	Round of 16			
2023–24	1	Pro A	8th	17–17	Quarterfinalist			
2024–25	1	Pro A	15th	8–22	Round of 16	4 FIBA Europe Cup	2R	5–7

^1 Cancelled due to the COVID-19 pandemic in Europe.

== Players ==
=== Current roster ===
Note: Flags indicate national team eligibility at FIBA-sanctioned events. Players may hold other non-FIBA nationalities not displayed.

ESSM Le Portel roster
Players
Coaches

Pos.	No.	Nat.	Name	Ht.	Age
C	0	(United States)	Crawford, Tyshaun	2.16 m (7 ft 1 in)	27 – 10 August 1999
SG	1	(France)	Fischer, Lucas	1.93 m (6 ft 4 in)	22 – 1 August 2004
G	2	(France)	Ebunangombe, Christopher	1.93 m (6 ft 4 in)	19 – 26 July 2007
SG	3	(United States)	Wertz, Trey	1.96 m (6 ft 5 in)	26 – 6 December 1999
G/F	5	(France)	Konaté, Lahaou	1.96 m (6 ft 5 in)	34 – 17 November 1991
F/C	11	(United States)	Lee, Greg	2.05 m (6 ft 9 in)	28 – 4 February 1998
F/C	22	(France)	Boyer, Mathieu	2.08 m (6 ft 10 in)	30 – 22 October 1995
PF	23	(France)	Fevrier, Ivan	2.06 m (6 ft 9 in)	27 – 8 February 1999
C	32	(United States)	Quinn, Neal	2.18 m (7 ft 2 in)	25 – 31 May 2001
SG	44	(Croatia)	Krušlin, Filip	1.96 m (6 ft 5 in)	37 – 18 March 1989

Head coach

- (United States) Kenny Grant

Assistant coach(es)

- (France) Arnaud Ricoux
- (France) Vladimir Nestorovic

Legend

- (C) Team captain
- Injured

- Roster
Updated: October 12, 2025

=== Notable players ===
Note: Flags indicate national team eligibility at FIBA-sanctioned events. Players may hold other non-FIBA nationalities not displayed.

Criteria

To appear in this section a player must have either:

- Set a club record or won an individual award while at the club
- Played at least one official international match for their national team at any time
- Played at least one official NBA match at any time.

- (United States) Devin Davis
- (United States) Jakim Donaldson
- (Finland) Shawn Huff
- (Finland) Edon Maxhuni
