= List of 2023–24 EuroLeague transactions =

This is a list of all personnel changes for the 2023 EuroLeague off-season and 2023–24 EuroLeague season.

== Retirements ==
Date	Name	EuroLeague Team(s) and played (years)	Age	Notes	Ref.
June 23	(Serbia) Stefan Marković	(Spanish Basketball Federation) Unicaja Málaga (2014–2016); (Russian Basketball Federation) Khimki (2017–2019); (Basketball Federation of Serbia) Crvena zvezda (2021–2023)	35	Eurocup all-time leader in assists; Eurocup all-time leader in steals	
July 7	(Italy) Luigi Datome	(Italian Basketball Federation) Siena (2004–2006); (Italian Basketball Federation) Virtus Roma (2008–2011); (Turkish Basketball Federation) Fenerbahçe (2015–2020); (Italian Basketball Federation) Olimpia Milano (2020–2023)	35	EuroLeague champion (2017); All-EuroLeague Second Team (2016)	
August 7	(Israel) Guy Pnini	(Israeli Basketball Association) Maccabi Tel Aviv (2009–2017, 2022–2023)	39	EuroLeague champion (2014)	
August 31	(United States) Othello Hunter	(Italian Basketball Federation) Siena (2013–2014); (Hellenic Basketball Federation) Olympiacos (2014–2016); (Spanish Basketball Federation) Real Madrid (2016–2017); (Russian Basketball Federation) CSKA Moscow (2017–2019); (Israeli Basketball Association) Maccabi Tel Aviv (2019–2021); (German Basketball Federation) Bayern Munich (2021–2023)	37	EuroLeague champion (2019)	

== Managerial changes ==
=== Managerial changes ===
Team	Outgoing manager	Manner of departure	Date of vacancy	Position in table	Replaced with	Date of appointment
(German Basketball Federation) Bayern Munich	(Italian Basketball Federation) Andrea Trinchieri	Mutual agreement	2 June 2023	Pre-season	(Spanish Basketball Federation) Pablo Laso	12 June 2023
(Hellenic Basketball Federation) Panathinaikos	(Hellenic Basketball Federation) Christos Serelis	End of contract	20 June 2023	Pre-season	(Turkish Basketball Federation) Ergin Ataman	20 June 2023
(Turkish Basketball Federation) Anadolu Efes	(Turkish Basketball Federation) Ergin Ataman	Signed by Panathinaikos	20 June 2023	Pre-season	(Turkish Basketball Federation) Erdem Can	20 June 2023
(Spanish Basketball Federation) Barcelona	(Lithuanian Basketball Federation) Šarūnas Jasikevičius	End of contract	26 June 2023	Pre-season	(Spanish Basketball Federation) Roger Grimau	26 June 2023
(Italian Basketball Federation) Virtus Bologna	(Italian Basketball Federation) Sergio Scariolo	Sacked	15 September 2023	Pre-season	(Italian Basketball Federation) Luca Banchi	15 September 2023
(French Federation of Basketball) ASVEL	(French Federation of Basketball) T. J. Parker	Sacked	20 October 2023	18th (0–4)	(Italian Basketball Federation) Gianmarco Pozzecco	25 October 2023
(Basketball Federation of Serbia) Crvena zvezda	(Basketball Federation of Montenegro) Duško Ivanović	Sacked	21 October 2023	13th (1–3)	(Hellenic Basketball Federation) Ioannis Sfairopoulos	22 October 2023
(Spanish Basketball Federation) Baskonia	(Spanish Basketball Federation) Joan Peñarroya	Sacked	30 October 2023	16th (1–4)	(Basketball Federation of Montenegro) Duško Ivanović	30 October 2023
(Turkish Basketball Federation) Fenerbahçe	(Hellenic Basketball Federation) Dimitrios Itoudis	Sacked	13 December 2023	12th (6–7)	(Lithuanian Basketball Federation) Šarūnas Jasikevičius	14 December 2023
(Lithuanian Basketball Federation) Žalgiris	(Lithuanian Basketball Federation) Kazys Maksvytis	Sacked	30 December 2023	16th (5–12)	(Italian Basketball Federation) Andrea Trinchieri	30 December 2023
(French Federation of Basketball) ASVEL	(Italian Basketball Federation) Gianmarco Pozzecco	Sacked	6 January 2024	17th (3–16)	(French Federation of Basketball) Pierric Poupet	6 January 2024
(Turkish Basketball Federation) Anadolu Efes	(Turkish Basketball Federation) Erdem Can	Sacked	1 February 2024	16th (9–15)	(Croatian Basketball Federation) Tomislav Mijatovic	1 February 2024
(Spanish Basketball Federation) Valencia	(Spanish Basketball Federation) Álex Mumbrú	Sacked	5 April 2024	13th (14–19)	(Spanish Basketball Federation) Xavi Albert	5 April 2024

== Player movements ==
=== Between two EuroLeague teams ===
Date	Player	From	To	Contract years	Ref.
June 22	(Greece) Kostas Antetokounmpo	(Turkish Basketball Federation) Fenerbahçe	(Hellenic Basketball Federation) Panathinaikos	2	
June 26	(Argentina) Luca Vildoza	(Basketball Federation of Serbia) Crvena zvezda	(Hellenic Basketball Federation) Panathinaikos	3	
June 27	(France) Mouhammadou Jaiteh	(Italian Basketball Federation) Virtus Bologna	(French Federation of Basketball) Monaco	2	
June 27	(France) Mathias Lessort	(Basketball Federation of Serbia) Partizan	(Hellenic Basketball Federation) Panathinaikos	2	
June 27	(Italy) Nico Mannion	(Italian Basketball Federation) Virtus Bologna	(Spanish Basketball Federation) Baskonia	2	
June 27	(Canada) Naz Mitrou-Long	(Italian Basketball Federation) Olimpia Milano	(Lithuanian Basketball Federation) Žalgiris	1+1	
June 28	(United States) Nigel Williams-Goss	(Spanish Basketball Federation) Real Madrid	(Hellenic Basketball Federation) Olympiacos	2	
July 1	(Nigeria) Semi Ojeleye	(Italian Basketball Federation) Virtus Bologna	(Spanish Basketball Federation) Valencia	2	
July 5	(Uganda) Brandon Davies	(Italian Basketball Federation) Olimpia Milano	(Spanish Basketball Federation) Valencia	2	
July 5	(United States) James Webb III	(Spanish Basketball Federation) Valencia	(Israeli Basketball Association) Maccabi Tel Aviv	2	
July 7	(United States) Darius Thompson	(Spanish Basketball Federation) Baskonia	(Turkish Basketball Federation) Anadolu Efes	3	
July 8	(Greece) Kostas Sloukas	(Hellenic Basketball Federation) Olympiacos	(Hellenic Basketball Federation) Panathinaikos	3	
July 11	(Serbia) Miloš Teodosić	(Italian Basketball Federation) Virtus Bologna	(Basketball Federation of Serbia) Crvena zvezda	1	
July 12	(Hungary) Ádám Hanga	(Spanish Basketball Federation) Real Madrid	(Basketball Federation of Serbia) Crvena zvezda	2	
July 12	(Israel) Yam Madar	(Basketball Federation of Serbia) Partizan	(Turkish Basketball Federation) Fenerbahçe	2+1	
July 12	(Greece) Ioannis Papapetrou	(Basketball Federation of Serbia) Partizan	(Hellenic Basketball Federation) Panathinaikos	2	
July 13	(Serbia) Ognjen Dobrić	(Basketball Federation of Serbia) Crvena zvezda	(Italian Basketball Federation) Virtus Bologna	2	
July 13	(Serbia) Ognjen Jaramaz	(German Basketball Federation) Bayern Munich	(Basketball Federation of Serbia) Partizan	2	
July 13	(Poland) Mateusz Ponitka	(Hellenic Basketball Federation) Panathinaikos	(Basketball Federation of Serbia) Partizan	2	
July 13	(Turkey) Sertaç Şanlı	(Spanish Basketball Federation) Barcelona	(Turkish Basketball Federation) Fenerbahçe	2	
July 13	(United States) Luke Sikma	(German Basketball Federation) Alba Berlin	(Hellenic Basketball Federation) Olympiacos	2	
July 14	(Russia) Joel Bolomboy	(Hellenic Basketball Federation) Olympiacos	(Basketball Federation of Serbia) Crvena zvezda	1	
July 14	(Slovenia) Mike Tobey	(Spanish Basketball Federation) Barcelona	(Basketball Federation of Serbia) Crvena zvezda	1	
July 15	(Lithuania) Rokas Giedraitis	(Spanish Basketball Federation) Baskonia	(Basketball Federation of Serbia) Crvena zvezda	1	
July 15	(Greece) Georgios Papagiannis	(Hellenic Basketball Federation) Panathinaikos	(Turkish Basketball Federation) Fenerbahçe	2	
July 16	(United States) Shabazz Napier	(Italian Basketball Federation) Olimpia Milano	(Basketball Federation of Serbia) Crvena zvezda	2	
July 17	(Israel) Tamir Blatt	(German Basketball Federation) ALBA Berlin	(Israeli Basketball Association) Maccabi Tel Aviv	2	
July 18	(Argentina) Facundo Campazzo	(Basketball Federation of Serbia) Crvena zvezda	(Spanish Basketball Federation) Real Madrid	4	
July 19	(France) Petr Cornelie	(Spanish Basketball Federation) Real Madrid	(French Federation of Basketball) Monaco	3	
July 19	(Nigeria) Chima Moneke	(French Federation of Basketball) Monaco	(Spanish Basketball Federation) Baskonia	2	
July 20	(Cameroon) Paris Lee	(Hellenic Basketball Federation) Panathinaikos	(French Federation of Basketball) ASVEL	1	
July 20	(Croatia) Jaleen Smith	(German Basketball Federation) ALBA Berlin	(Italian Basketball Federation) Virtus Bologna	2	
July 21	(United States) Carsen Edwards	(Turkish Basketball Federation) Fenerbahçe	(German Basketball Federation) Bayern Munich	1	
July 22	(Germany) Maodo Lô	(German Basketball Federation) ALBA Berlin	(Italian Basketball Federation) Olimpia Milano	2	
July 24	(United States) Devin Booker	(Turkish Basketball Federation) Fenerbahçe	(German Basketball Federation) Bayern Munich	2	
July 28	(Ivory Coast) Alex Poythress	(Israeli Basketball Association) Maccabi Tel Aviv	(Italian Basketball Federation) Olimpia Milano	1	
July 30	(Cuba) Jasiel Rivero	(Spanish Basketball Federation) Valencia	(Israeli Basketball Association) Maccabi Tel Aviv	1	
August 3	(France) Timothé Luwawu-Cabarrot	(Italian Basketball Federation) Olimpia Milano	(French Federation of Basketball) ASVEL	1	
August 3	(Spain) Nikola Mirotić	(Spanish Basketball Federation) Barcelona	(Italian Basketball Federation) Olimpia Milano	3	
August 7	(United States) Matt Thomas	(Hellenic Basketball Federation) Panathinaikos	(German Basketball Federation) Alba Berlin	1	
August 25	(Armenia) Bryant Dunston	(Turkish Basketball Federation) Anadolu Efes	(Italian Basketball Federation) Virtus Bologna	1+1	
September 12	(Serbia) Nemanja Bjelica	(Turkish Basketball Federation) Fenerbahçe	(Basketball Federation of Serbia) Crvena zvezda	1	
September 24	(Lithuania) Ignas Brazdeikis	(Lithuanian Basketball Federation) Žalgiris	(Hellenic Basketball Federation) Olympiacos	2+1	
November 21	(Canada) Naz Mitrou-Long	(Lithuanian Basketball Federation) Žalgiris	(Hellenic Basketball Federation) Olympiacos	3	
December 18	(United States) Freddie Gillespie	(German Basketball Federation) Bayern Munich	(Basketball Federation of Serbia) Crvena zvezda	1	
December 21	(United States) Shabazz Napier	(Basketball Federation of Serbia) Crvena zvezda	(Italian Basketball Federation) Olimpia Milano	1	
December 24	(Croatia) Jaleen Smith	(Italian Basketball Federation) Virtus Bologna	(Basketball Federation of Serbia) Partizan	1	
December 30	(Canada) Kevin Pangos	(Italian Basketball Federation) Olimpia Milano	(Spanish Basketball Federation) Valencia	1	
December 31	(Croatia) Ante Žižić	(Turkish Basketball Federation) Anadolu Efes	(Italian Basketball Federation) Virtus Bologna	3	

=== To a EuroLeague team ===
^{*}	Denotes Euroleague rookie players

Date	Player	From	To	Contract years	Ref.
June 16	(Senegal) Mbaye Ndiaye*	(French Federation of Basketball) Blois	(French Federation of Basketball) ASVEL	3	
June 22	(France) Terry Tarpey*	(French Federation of Basketball) Le Mans	(French Federation of Basketball) Monaco	3	
June 23	(Greece) Dimitris Moraitis*	(Hellenic Basketball Federation) Peristeri	(Hellenic Basketball Federation) Panathinaikos	3	
June 24	(United States) Tyrique Jones*	(Turkish Basketball Federation) Türk Telekom	(Turkish Basketball Federation) Anadolu Efes	2	
June 24	(Serbia) Nikola Milutinov	(Russian Basketball Federation) CSKA Moscow	(Hellenic Basketball Federation) Olympiacos	2	
June 24	(Turkey) Doğuş Özdemiroğlu	(Turkish Basketball Federation) Darüşşafaka	(Turkish Basketball Federation) Anadolu Efes	2	
June 25	(United States) Derek Willis*	(Italian Basketball Federation) Reyer Venezia	(Turkish Basketball Federation) Anadolu Efes	1+1	
June 25	(Turkey) Erkan Yılmaz*	(Turkish Basketball Federation) Türk Telekom	(Turkish Basketball Federation) Anadolu Efes	2	
June 27	(Italy) Guglielmo Caruso*	(Italian Basketball Federation) Varese	(Italian Basketball Federation) Olimpia Milano	4	
June 29	(Serbia) Dejan Davidovac	(Russian Basketball Federation) CSKA Moscow	(Basketball Federation of Serbia) Crvena zvezda	3	
July 3	(Lithuania) Danielius Lavrinovičius*	(Lithuanian Basketball Federation) Nevėžis	(Lithuanian Basketball Federation) Žalgiris	1+1	
July 3	(Greece) Nikos Rogkavopoulos*	(Turkish Basketball Federation) Merkezefendi	(Spanish Basketball Federation) Baskonia	3	
July 4	(France) Boris Dallo	(French Federation of Basketball) Cholet	(French Federation of Basketball) ASVEL	1	
July 4	(Senegal) Boubacar Toure*	(Turkish Basketball Federation) Tofaş	(Spanish Basketball Federation) Valencia	2	
July 5	(Nigeria) John Egbunu*	(Turkish Basketball Federation) Gaziantep	(French Federation of Basketball) ASVEL	1	
July 5	(Italy) Bruno Mascolo*	(Italian Basketball Federation) Brindisi	(Italian Basketball Federation) Virtus Bologna	1	
July 6	(Greece) Dinos Mitoglou	free agent	(Hellenic Basketball Federation) Panathinaikos	3	
July 7	(France) Damien Inglis*	(Spanish Basketball Federation) Gran Canaria	(Spanish Basketball Federation) Valencia	2	
July 7	(United States) Frank Jackson*	(USA Basketball) Salt Lake City Stars	(French Federation of Basketball) ASVEL	1	
July 7	(Spain) Joel Parra*	(Spanish Basketball Federation) Joventut Badalona	(Spanish Basketball Federation) Barcelona	4	
July 8	(Montenegro) Marko Simonović*	(USA Basketball) Chicago Bulls	(Basketball Federation of Serbia) Crvena zvezda	2	
July 10	(United States) Devontae Cacok*	(Russian Basketball Federation) CSKA Moscow	(Italian Basketball Federation) Virtus Bologna	2	
July 10	(United States) Jerian Grant	(Turkish Basketball Federation) Türk Telekom	(Hellenic Basketball Federation) Panathinaikos	1	
July 12	(Spain) Willy Hernangómez	(USA Basketball) New Orleans Pelicans	(Spanish Basketball Federation) Barcelona	3	
July 13	(Spain) Darío Brizuela*	(Spanish Basketball Federation) Málaga	(Spanish Basketball Federation) Barcelona	3	
July 14	(Senegal) Khalifa Diop	(Spanish Basketball Federation) Gran Canaria	(Spanish Basketball Federation) Baskonia		
July 14	(United States) Kyle Guy*	(Spanish Basketball Federation) Joventut Badalona	(Hellenic Basketball Federation) Panathinaikos	2	
July 14	(United States) Nate Sestina*	(Turkish Basketball Federation) Türk Telekom	(Turkish Basketball Federation) Fenerbahçe	1+1	
July 15	(Greece) Georgios Tanoulis*	(Hellenic Basketball Federation) Promitheas Patras	(Hellenic Basketball Federation) Olympiacos	4	
July 17	(Brazil) Yago dos Santos*	(German Basketball Federation) Ratiopharm Ulm	(Basketball Federation of Serbia) Crvena zvezda	3	
July 17	(Bulgaria) Codi Miller-McIntyre*	(Turkish Basketball Federation) Gaziantep	(Spanish Basketball Federation) Baskonia	2	
July 17	(Canada) Kassius Robertson*	(Spanish Basketball Federation) Obradoiro	(Spanish Basketball Federation) Valencia	2	
July 19	(United States) Justin Bean*	(USA Basketball) Memphis Hustle	(German Basketball Federation) Alba Berlin	3	
July 19	(Argentina) Leandro Bolmaro	(Spanish Basketball Federation) Tenerife	(German Basketball Federation) Bayern Munich	2	
July 19	(France) Ismaël Kamagate*	(French Federation of Basketball) Paris	(Italian Basketball Federation) Olimpia Milano	2	
July 20	(France) Sylvain Francisco*	(Hellenic Basketball Federation) Peristeri	(German Basketball Federation) Bayern Munich	2	
July 21	(United States) Brady Manek*	(Turkish Basketball Federation) Tofaş	(Lithuanian Basketball Federation) Žalgiris	1+1	
July 21	(United States) Kemba Walker*	(USA Basketball) Dallas Mavericks	(French Federation of Basketball) Monaco	1	
July 27	(United States) Antonius Cleveland*	(Israeli Basketball Association) Hapoel Eilat	(Israeli Basketball Association) Maccabi Tel Aviv	2	
July 27	(Spain) Juancho Hernangómez*	(Canada Basketball) Toronto Raptors	(Hellenic Basketball Federation) Panathinaikos	2	
July 28	(Poland) Aleksander Balcerowski	(Spanish Basketball Federation) Gran Canaria	(Hellenic Basketball Federation) Panathinaikos	2	
July 31	(Italy) Diego Flaccadori	(Italian Basketball Federation) Trento	(Italian Basketball Federation) Olimpia Milano	2	
July 31	(United States) Nate Reuvers*	(Italian Basketball Federation) Reggio Emilia	(Spanish Basketball Federation) Valencia	3	
July 31	(United States) Mike Scott*	(French Federation of Basketball) Nancy	(French Federation of Basketball) ASVEL	1	
August 4	(France) Edwin Jackson	(Spanish Basketball Federation) Menorca	(French Federation of Basketball) ASVEL	1	
August 5	(Brazil) Raul Neto*	(USA Basketball) Cleveland Cavaliers	(Turkish Basketball Federation) Fenerbahçe	1+1	
August 7	(United States) Jabari Parker*	free agent	(Spanish Basketball Federation) Barcelona	1	
August 9	(Italy) Matteo Spagnolo*	(Italian Basketball Federation) Trento	(German Basketball Federation) Alba Berlin	3	
August 12	(United States) PJ Dozier*	(USA Basketball) Sacramento Kings	(Basketball Federation of Serbia) Partizan	3	
August 14	(Turkey) Ercan Osmani*	(Turkish Basketball Federation) Darüşşafaka	(Turkish Basketball Federation) Anadolu Efes	1+1	
August 14	(Turkey) Burak Can Yıldızlı*	(Turkish Basketball Federation) Beşiktaş	(Turkish Basketball Federation) Anadolu Efes	1	
August 15	(United States) Sterling Brown*	(Canada Basketball) Raptors 905	(German Basketball Federation) Alba Berlin	2	
August 17	(United States) Frank Kaminsky*	(USA Basketball) Houston Rockets	(Basketball Federation of Serbia) Partizan	1	
August 23	(Germany) Justus Hollatz*	(Basketball Federation of Slovenia) Cedevita Olimpija	(Turkish Basketball Federation) Anadolu Efes	1	
September 16	(Spain) Serge Ibaka	(USA Basketball) Milwaukee Bucks	(German Basketball Federation) Bayern Munich	1	
September 18	(Latvia) Artūrs Žagars*	(Lithuanian Basketball Federation) Nevėžis	(Turkish Basketball Federation) Fenerbahçe	3	
September 19	(Serbia) Stefan Jović	(Spanish Basketball Federation) Zaragoza	(Spanish Basketball Federation) Valencia	1	
October 31	(United States) Kendrick Nunn*	(USA Basketball) Washington Wizards	(Hellenic Basketball Federation) Panathinaikos	1	
November 1	(United States) Chris Chiozza*	(Spanish Basketball Federation) Murcia	(Spanish Basketball Federation) Baskonia	1	
November 7	(Brazil) Bruno Caboclo*	(German Basketball Federation) Ratiopharm Ulm	(Basketball Federation of Serbia) Partizan	2	
November 27	(Serbia) Filip Petrušev	(USA Basketball) Sacramento Kings	(Hellenic Basketball Federation) Olympiacos	3	
November 29	(United States) Mike Daum*	(Italian Basketball Federation) Tortona	(Turkish Basketball Federation) Anadolu Efes	1+1	
November 29	(United States) Edmond Sumner*	(USA Basketball) Brooklyn Nets	(Lithuanian Basketball Federation) Žalgiris	1	
December 4	(United States) Daniel Oturu*	(Turkish Basketball Federation) Merkezefendi	(Turkish Basketball Federation) Anadolu Efes	1	
December 14	(Turkey) Rıdvan Öncel*	(Turkish Basketball Federation) Darüşşafaka	(Turkish Basketball Federation) Anadolu Efes	1	
December 24	(United States) Justin Anderson*	(Spanish Basketball Federation) Breogán	(Spanish Basketball Federation) Valencia	1 month	
December 26	(Serbia) Nikola Topić*	(Basketball Federation of Serbia) Mega	(Basketball Federation of Serbia) Crvena zvezda	4	
December 29	(Latvia) Rihards Lomažs	(Turkish Basketball Federation) Merkezefendi	(Italian Basketball Federation) Virtus Bologna	1	
January 22	(France) Amine Noua	(Italian Basketball Federation) Derthona	(Turkish Basketball Federation) Fenerbahçe	1 month	

=== Leaving a EuroLeague team ===
Date	Player	From	To	Ref.
June 10	(France) Antoine Diot	(French Federation of Basketball) ASVEL	(French Federation of Basketball) Roanne	
June 14	(Belgium) Sam Van Rossom	(Spanish Basketball Federation) Valencia	(Basketball Belgium) Oostende	
June 16	(France) Zaccharie Risacher	(French Federation of Basketball) ASVEL	(French Federation of Basketball) Bourg	
June 20	(United States) Zylan Cheatham	(German Basketball Federation) Bayern Munich	(Basketball New Zealand) New Zealand Breakers	
June 24	(Turkey) Buğrahan Tuncer	(Turkish Basketball Federation) Anadolu Efes	(Turkish Basketball Federation) Galatasaray	
June 21	(Slovenia) Žan Mark Šiško	(German Basketball Federation) Bayern Munich	(Spanish Basketball Federation) Breogán	
June 26	(Turkey) İsmet Akpınar	(Turkish Basketball Federation) Fenerbahçe	(Turkish Basketball Federation) Galatasaray	
June 27	(United States) Jalen Adams	(Israeli Basketball Association) Maccabi Tel Aviv	(Turkish Basketball Federation) Türk Telekom	
June 29	(Slovakia) Kyle Kuric	(Spanish Basketball Federation) Barcelona	(Russian Basketball Federation) Zenit Saint Petersburg	
June 29	(United States) Hassan Martin	(Basketball Federation of Serbia) Crvena zvezda	(Japan Basketball Association) Shimane Susanoo Magic	
June 30	(France) Amath M'Baye	(Turkish Basketball Federation) Anadolu Efes	(Russian Basketball Federation) CSKA Moscow	
July 3	(Italy) Tommaso Baldasso	(Italian Basketball Federation) Olimpia Milano	(Italian Basketball Federation) Derthona	
July 3	(Armenia) Steven Enoch	(Spanish Basketball Federation) Baskonia	(Turkish Basketball Federation) Türk Telekom	
July 5	(United States) Jonah Mathews	(French Federation of Basketball) ASVEL	(Turkish Basketball Federation) Beşiktaş	
July 6	(Turkey) Samet Geyik	(Turkish Basketball Federation) Fenerbahçe	(Turkish Basketball Federation) Galatasaray	
July 9	(Israel) Yovel Zoosman	(German Basketball Federation) Alba Berlin	(Israeli Basketball Association) Hapoel Jerusalem	
July 10	(Italy) Davide Alviti	(Italian Basketball Federation) Olimpia Milano	(Italian Basketball Federation) Trento	
July 10	(Serbia) Corey Walden	(German Basketball Federation) Bayern Munich	(Turkish Basketball Federation) Galatasaray	
July 11	(United States) Kyle Weems	(Italian Basketball Federation) Virtus Bologna	(Italian Basketball Federation) Derthona	
July 11	(Germany) Paul Zipser	(German Basketball Federation) Bayern Munich	(German Basketball Federation) Heidelberg	
July 14	(Belgium) Retin Obasohan	(French Federation of Basketball) ASVEL	(Italian Basketball Federation) Derthona	
July 15	(Australia) Dante Exum	(Basketball Federation of Serbia) Partizan	(USA Basketball) Dallas Mavericks	
July 17	(Serbia) Filip Petrušev	(Basketball Federation of Serbia) Crvena zvezda	(USA Basketball) Philadelphia 76ers	
July 18	(Serbia) Vasilije Micić	(Turkish Basketball Federation) Anadolu Efes	(USA Basketball) Oklahoma City Thunder	
July 18	(United States) Cassius Winston	(German Basketball Federation) Bayern Munich	(Turkish Basketball Federation) Tofaş	
July 19	(United States) Deshaun Thomas	(Italian Basketball Federation) Olimpia Milano	(Spanish Basketball Federation) Joventut Badalona	
July 19	(Bulgaria) Sasha Vezenkov	(Hellenic Basketball Federation) Olympiacos	(USA Basketball) Sacramento Kings	
July 20	(Nigeria) Tonye Jekiri	(Turkish Basketball Federation) Fenerbahçe	(Russian Basketball Federation) CSKA Moscow	
July 21	(Lithuania) Artūras Gudaitis	(Hellenic Basketball Federation) Panathinaikos	(Japan Basketball Association) Alvark Tokyo	
July 26	(Canada) Kyle Alexander	(Spanish Basketball Federation) Valencia	(Israeli Basketball Association) Hapoel Tel Aviv	
July 27	(Puerto Rico) John Holland	(Basketball Federation of Serbia) Crvena zvezda	(Israeli Basketball Association) Hapoel Tel Aviv	
July 28	(United States) D.J. Seeley	(German Basketball Federation) Bayern Munich	(Romanian Basketball Federation) Cluj-Napoca	
July 29	(Montenegro) Nikola Ivanović	(Basketball Federation of Serbia) Crvena zvezda	(Russian Basketball Federation) Runa	
August 1	(United States) Ben Lammers	(German Basketball Federation) Alba Berlin	(Spanish Basketball Federation) Gran Canaria	
August 1	(France) Amine Noua	(French Federation of Basketball) ASVEL	(Israeli Basketball Association) Hapoel Holon	
August 3	(Latvia) Artūrs Kurucs	(Spanish Basketball Federation) Baskonia	(Hellenic Basketball Federation) Promitheas Patras	
August 12	(Greece) Lefteris Bochoridis	(Hellenic Basketball Federation) Panathinaikos	(Hellenic Basketball Federation) Aris	

== See also ==
- List of 2023–24 NBA season transactions
