= 2022–23 EuroCup Basketball =

European basketball season

2022–23 7DAYS EuroCup^{1}
- Season: 2022–23
- Dates: 11 October 2022 – 3 May 2023
- Games played: 195
- Teams: 20

Regular season
- Season MVP: Jerian Grant (Türk Telekom)

Finals
- Champions: (Spanish Basketball Federation) Gran Canaria (1st title)
- Runners-up: (Turkish Basketball Federation) Türk Telekom
- Semi-finalists: (Spanish Basketball Federation) Joventut (Ukraine) Prometey
- Finals MVP: John Shurna (Gran Canaria)

Awards
- Coach of the Year: Erdem Can
- Rising Star: Aleksander Balcerowski

Statistical leaders
Points	Yogi Ferrell	18.4
Rebounds	Alpha Kaba	10.5
Assists	J'Covan Brown	6.7
Index Rating	Yogi Ferrell	21.4

Records
- Biggest home win: Hapoel Tel Aviv 108–69 Promitheas (28 March 2023)
- Biggest away win: Śląsk Wrocław 58–98 Budućnost VOLI (18 October 2022)
- Highest scoring: Prometey 105–106 ratiopharm Ulm (30 November 2022)
- Highest attendance: 9,869; Gran Canaria 71–67 Türk Telekom (3 May 2023)
- Lowest attendance: 240; Prometey 105–82 U-BT Cluj-Napoca (14 December 2022)
- ^{1} Sponsored name, referring to 7DAYS.

The 2022–23 EuroCup Basketball season was the 21st season of Euroleague Basketball's secondary level professional club basketball tournament. It is the 15th season since it was renamed from the ULEB Cup to the EuroCup, and the seventh and final season under the title sponsorship name of 7DAYS. The season began on 11 October 2022 and ended on 3 May 2023.

Gran Canaria defeated Türk Telekom in the final, which was played at the Gran Canaria Arena in Las Palmas, to win their first EuroCup title. As winners, Gran Canaria automatically qualified for the 2023–24 EuroLeague. However, Gran Canaria gave up their spot in the league due to financial reasons.

The defending champions were Virtus Bologna, who were unable to defend their title as they played in the 2022–23 EuroLeague.

== Team allocation ==
A total of 20 teams from 13 leagues participated in the 2022–23 EuroCup Basketball season.

=== Teams ===
League positions after playoffs of the previous season shown in parentheses.

Qualified teams for 2022–23 EuroCup Basketball (by entry round)
Regular season
(Italian Basketball Federation) Germani Brescia (5th)	(French Federation of Basketball) Mincidelice JL Bourg (11th)	(Spanish Basketball Federation) Gran Canaria (8th)	(Lithuanian Basketball Federation) Lietkabelis (2nd)
(Italian Basketball Federation) Umana Reyer Venezia (6th)	(French Federation of Basketball) Paris Basketball (15th)	(Turkish Basketball Federation) Frutti Extra Bursaspor (8th)	(Polish Basketball Federation) Śląsk Wrocław (1st)
(Italian Basketball Federation) Dolomiti Energia Trento (13th)	(German Basketball Federation) ratiopharm Ulm (5th)	(Turkish Basketball Federation) Türk Telekom (11th)	(Romanian Basketball Federation) U-BT Cluj-Napoca (1st)
(Basketball Federation of Montenegro) Budućnost VOLI (3rd)	(German Basketball Federation) Veolia Towers Hamburg (7th)	(Hellenic Basketball Federation) Promitheas (3rd)	(Basketball Federation of Ukraine) Prometey (Abd-1st)
(Basketball Federation of Slovenia) Cedevita Olimpija (4th)	(Spanish Basketball Federation) Joventut (3rd)	(Israeli Basketball Association) Hapoel Tel Aviv (7th)	(British Basketball) London Lions (2nd)

Notes

1. ABA League (ABA): Budućnost VOLI and Cedevita Olimpija qualified through the ABA League.
2. Ukraine (UKR): The 2021–22 Ukrainian Basketball SuperLeague was abandoned due to the 2022 Russian invasion of Ukraine. The top team of the league at the time of the abandonment (Prometey) was selected to play in the 2022–23 EuroCup Basketball.

== Round and draw dates ==
The schedule of the competition was as follows.

Schedule for 2022–23 EuroCup Basketball
Phase	Round	Draw date	Round date
Regular season	Round 1	8 July 2022	11–12 October 2022
Regular season	Round 2	8 July 2022	18–19 October 2022
Regular season	Round 3	8 July 2022	25–26 October 2022
Regular season	Round 4	8 July 2022	1–2 November 2022
Regular season	Round 5	8 July 2022	22–23 November 2022
Regular season	Round 6	8 July 2022	29–30 November 2022
Regular season	Round 7	8 July 2022	6–7 December 2022
Regular season	Round 8	8 July 2022	13–14 December 2022
Regular season	Round 9	8 July 2022	20–21 December 2022
Regular season	Round 10	8 July 2022	10–11 January 2023
Regular season	Round 11	8 July 2022	17–18 January 2023
Regular season	Round 12	8 July 2022	24–25 January 2023
Regular season	Round 13	8 July 2022	31 January–1 February 2023
Regular season	Round 14	8 July 2022	7–8 February 2023
Regular season	Round 15	8 July 2022	7–8 March 2023
Regular season	Round 16	8 July 2022	14–15 March 2023
Regular season	Round 17	8 July 2022	21–22 March 2023
Regular season	Round 18	8 July 2022	28–29 March 2023
Playoffs	Eighthfinals	8 July 2022	12–13 April 2023
Playoffs	Quarterfinals	8 July 2022	18–19 April 2023
Playoffs	Semifinals	8 July 2022	25–26 April 2023
Playoffs	Final	8 July 2022	3 May 2023

=== Draw ===
The draw was held on 8 July 2022 in Barcelona, Spain.

The 20 teams were drawn into two groups of 10, with the restriction that teams from the same league could not be drawn against each other, except when there were more than two teams from the same league participating in the regular season. For the draw, the teams were seeded into 10 pots, in accordance with the Club Ranking, based on their performance in European competitions during a three-year period and the lowest possible position that any club from that league can occupy in the draw is calculated by adding the results of the worst performing team from each league.

Pot 1 Team (Israeli Basketball Association) Hapoel Tel Aviv (Spanish Basketball Federation) Joventut	Pot 2 Team (Spanish Basketball Federation) Gran Canaria (Basketball Federation of Slovenia) Cedevita Olimpija	Pot 3 Team (Basketball Federation of Montenegro) Budućnost VOLI (Italian Basketball Federation) Umana Reyer Venezia	Pot 4 Team (Italian Basketball Federation) Dolomiti Energia Trento (Turkish Basketball Federation) Frutti Extra Bursaspor
Pot 5 Team (Turkish Basketball Federation) Türk Telekom (Lithuanian Basketball Federation) Lietkabelis	Pot 6 Team (Hellenic Basketball Federation) Promitheas (French Federation of Basketball) Mincidelice JL Bourg	Pot 7 Team (French Federation of Basketball) Paris Basketball (German Basketball Federation) ratiopharm Ulm	Pot 8 Team (Italian Basketball Federation) Germani Brescia (German Basketball Federation) Veolia Towers Hamburg
Pot 9 Team (Polish Basketball Federation) Śląsk Wrocław (Romanian Basketball Federation) U-BT Cluj-Napoca	Pot 10 Team (British Basketball) London Lions (Basketball Federation of Ukraine) Prometey

The fixtures were decided after the draw, using a computer draw not shown to public, with the following match sequence:

Note: Positions for scheduling do not use the seeding pots, e.g., Team 1 is not necessarily the team from Pot 1 in the draw.

Round	Matches
Round 1	10 v 5, 6 v 4, 7 v 3, 8 v 2, 9 v 1
Round 2	1 v 10, 2 v 9, 3 v 8, 4 v 7, 5 v 6
Round 3	10 v 6, 7 v 5, 8 v 4, 9 v 3, 1 v 2
Round 4	2 v 10, 3 v 1, 4 v 9, 5 v 8, 6 v 7
Round 5	10 v 7, 8 v 6, 9 v 5, 1 v 4, 2 v 3
Round 6	3 v 10, 4 v 2, 5 v 1, 6 v 9, 7 v 8
Round 7	10 v 8, 9 v 7, 1 v 6, 2 v 5, 3 v 4
Round 8	10 v 4, 5 v 3, 6 v 2, 7 v 1, 8 v 9
Round 9	9 v 10, 1 v 8, 2 v 7, 3 v 6, 4 v 5

Round	Matches
Round 10	5 v 10, 4 v 6, 3 v 7, 2 v 8, 1 v 9
Round 11	10 v 1, 9 v 2, 8 v 3, 7 v 4, 6 v 5
Round 12	6 v 10, 5 v 7, 4 v 8, 3 v 9, 2 v 1
Round 13	10 v 2, 1 v 3, 9 v 4, 8 v 5, 7 v 6
Round 14	7 v 10, 6 v 8, 5 v 9, 4 v 1, 3 v 2
Round 15	10 v 3, 2 v 4, 1 v 5, 9 v 6, 8 v 7
Round 16	8 v 10, 7 v 9, 6 v 1, 5 v 2, 4 v 3
Round 17	4 v 10, 3 v 5, 2 v 6, 1 v 7, 9 v 8
Round 18	10 v 9, 8 v 1, 7 v 2, 6 v 3, 5 v 4

There were scheduling restrictions: for example, teams from the same city in general were not scheduled to play at home on the same round (to avoid them playing at home on the same day or on consecutive days, due to logistics and crowd control).

== Regular season ==
Location of teams of the 2021–22 EuroCup.
Red: Group A; Green: Group B. Team in italics will play its home games in a different cities due to the Russo-Ukrainian War.

The 20 teams are divided into two groups of 10 teams each. In each group, teams will play against each other home-and-away in a round-robin format for a total of 18 games played by each team. The top eight teams from each group will advance to the playoffs, while the last two teams from each group will be eliminated. The regular season started on 18 October 2022 and will end on 5 April 2023.

=== Group A ===
==== Standings ====
Pos	Team	Pld	W	L	PF	PA	PD	Qualification
1	(Basketball Federation of Ukraine) Prometey	18	14	4	1585	1483	+102	Advance to eighthfinals
2	(Spanish Basketball Federation) Joventut	18	13	5	1521	1408	+113	Advance to eighthfinals
3	(German Basketball Federation) ratiopharm Ulm	18	11	7	1513	1504	+9	Advance to eighthfinals
4	(Lithuanian Basketball Federation) Lietkabelis	18	10	8	1425	1458	−33	Advance to eighthfinals
5	(French Federation of Basketball) Mincidelice JL Bourg	18	9	9	1477	1505	−28	Advance to eighthfinals
6	(Italian Basketball Federation) Umana Reyer Venezia	18	9	9	1453	1388	+65	Advance to eighthfinals
7	(Italian Basketball Federation) Germani Brescia	18	8	10	1423	1429	−6	Advance to eighthfinals
8	(Turkish Basketball Federation) Frutti Extra Bursaspor	18	8	10	1520	1526	−6	Advance to eighthfinals
9	(Romanian Basketball Federation) U-BT Cluj-Napoca	18	5	13	1517	1607	−90	
10	(Basketball Federation of Slovenia) Cedevita Olimpija	18	3	15	1499	1625	−126	

Source: EuroCup
Rules for classification: All points scored in extra period(s) will not be counted in the standings, nor for any tie-break situation.

==== Results ====
Home \ Away	CJB	COL	URV	FEB	LIE	JLB	ULM	BRE	CLU	PMT
Joventut	—	96–91	90–87	83–82	81–60	80–85	82–76	80–63	104–81	82–77
Cedevita Olimpija	78–100	—	77–73	73–81	87–94	75–88	108–78	80–83	80–88	89–94
Umana Reyer Venezia	74–80	76–68	—	78–65	74–71	73–79	89–69	90–64	95–90	71–75
Frutti Extra Bursaspor	81–72	111–93	73–89	—	75–69	92–82	86–90	86–76	95–80	92–94
Lietkabelis	76–90	104–98	87–84	88–85	—	92–88	80–76	79–70	89–84	72–80
Mincidelice JL Bourg	65–86	90–91	86–79	80–89	86–73	—	78–85	66–74	88–85	92–85
ratiopharm Ulm	54–68	97–85	81–80	92–86	78–69	110–98	—	90–98	91–71	78–83
Germani Brescia	85–75	84–82	60–80	110–74	65–74	69–71	72–85	—	103–84	104–70
U-BT Cluj-Napoca	98–82	94–76	80–85	87–83	75–77	79–88	81–84	91–86	—	87–96
Prometey	95–90	94–68	93–76	90–84	82–71	96–82	105–106	79–72	105–82	—

Source: EuroCup
Legend: Blue = home team win; Red = away team win.
Matches with lighter background shading were decided after overtime.

=== Group B ===
==== Standings ====
Pos	Team	Pld	W	L	PF	PA	PD	Qualification
1	(Spanish Basketball Federation) Gran Canaria	18	15	3	1535	1411	+124	Advance to eighthfinals
2	(Turkish Basketball Federation) Türk Telekom	18	13	5	1516	1412	+104	Advance to eighthfinals
3	(Israeli Basketball Association) Hapoel Tel Aviv	18	13	5	1589	1395	+194	Advance to eighthfinals
4	(Hellenic Basketball Federation) Promitheas	18	11	7	1482	1504	−22	Advance to eighthfinals
5	(French Federation of Basketball) Paris Basketball	18	10	8	1545	1539	+6	Advance to eighthfinals
6	(Basketball Federation of Montenegro) Budućnost VOLI	18	9	9	1396	1348	+48	Advance to eighthfinals
7	(British Basketball) London Lions	18	8	10	1454	1454	0	Advance to eighthfinals
8	(German Basketball Federation) Hamburg Towers	18	6	12	1459	1535	−76	Advance to eighthfinals
9	(Italian Basketball Federation) Dolomiti Energia Trento	18	4	14	1315	1471	−156	
10	(Polish Basketball Federation) Śląsk Wrocław	18	1	17	1312	1534	−222	

Source: EuroCup
Rules for classification: All points scored in extra period(s) will not be counted in the standings, nor for any tie-break situation.

==== Results ====
Home \ Away	HTA	GCA	BUD	TRE	TTA	PRO	PRS	HHT	WKS	LLI
Hapoel Tel Aviv	—	92–70	64–70	93–63	84–82	108–69	95–79	91–85	103–73	76–59
Gran Canaria	85–83	—	79–71	94–88	89–79	91–72	118–99	86–73	92–81	87–69
Budućnost VOLI	89–79	69–94	—	73–58	71–84	95–89	74–77	66–73	82–71	78–68
Dolomiti Energia Trento	60–78	75–72	79–76	—	72–80	76–89	86–91	85–80	72–61	70–84
Türk Telekom	89–77	81–88	77–72	81–66	—	85–75	75–90	98–74	76–63	102–74
Promitheas	83–100	93–82	81–72	84–71	83–98	—	84–81	81–77	90–66	67–77
Paris Basketball	86–100	81–89	103–87	86–75	96–77	71–74	—	87–84	89–85	85–96
Veolia Towers Hamburg	98–91	76–83	59–87	89–87	83–88	103–105	91–74	—	87–83	75–103
Śląsk Wrocław	76–87	79–91	58–98	80–57	71–75	76–78	69–77	64–100	—	76–83
London Lions	93–95	57–60	78–87	80–75	84–89	89–93	80–93	83–66	97–80	—

Source: EuroCup
Legend: Blue = home team win; Red = away team win.
Matches with lighter background shading were decided after overtime.

== Playoffs ==
=== Bracket ===
The tournament bracket is shown below, with bold denoting the winners of each match.

Eighthfinals
**(Spanish Basketball Federation) Gran Canaria**	**72**
(Turkish Basketball Federation) Frutti Extra Bursaspor	66
(Lithuanian Basketball Federation) Lietkabelis	97
**(French Federation of Basketball) Paris Basketball**	**98**
**(Spanish Basketball Federation) Joventut**	**89**
(British Basketball) London Lions	78
**(Israeli Basketball Association) Hapoel Tel Aviv**	**90**
(Italian Basketball Federation) Umana Reyer Venezia	80
**(Basketball Federation of Ukraine) Prometey**	**87**
(German Basketball Federation) Veolia Towers Hamburg	79
**(Hellenic Basketball Federation) Promitheas**	**89**
(French Federation of Basketball) Mincidelice JL Bourg	75
**(Turkish Basketball Federation) Türk Telekom**	**77**
(Italian Basketball Federation) Germani Brescia	69
**(German Basketball Federation) ratiopharm Ulm**	**92**
(Basketball Federation of Montenegro) Budućnost VOLI	83

Quarterfinals
**(Spanish Basketball Federation) Gran Canaria**	**104**
(French Federation of Basketball) Paris Basketball	74
**(Spanish Basketball Federation) Joventut**	**82**
(Israeli Basketball Association) Hapoel Tel Aviv	74
**(Basketball Federation of Ukraine) Prometey**	**80**
(Hellenic Basketball Federation) Promitheas	57
**(Turkish Basketball Federation) Türk Telekom**	**86**
(German Basketball Federation) ratiopharm Ulm	76

Semifinals
**(Spanish Basketball Federation) Gran Canaria**	**89**
(Spanish Basketball Federation) Joventut	86
(Basketball Federation of Ukraine) Prometey	74
**(Turkish Basketball Federation) Türk Telekom**	**76**

Final
**(Spanish Basketball Federation) Gran Canaria**	**71**
(Turkish Basketball Federation) Türk Telekom	67

=== Eighthfinals ===
==== Summary ====
The eighthfinals were played on 11–12 April 2023.

Team 1	Score	Team 2
**Prometey** (Basketball Federation of Ukraine)	87–79	(German Basketball Federation) Veolia Towers Hamburg
**Promitheas** (Hellenic Basketball Federation)	89–75	(French Federation of Basketball) Mincidelice JL Bourg
**Türk Telekom** (Turkish Basketball Federation)	77–69	(Italian Basketball Federation) Germani Brescia
**ratiopharm Ulm** (German Basketball Federation)	92–83	(Basketball Federation of Montenegro) Budućnost VOLI
**Gran Canaria** (Spanish Basketball Federation)	72–66	(Turkish Basketball Federation) Frutti Extra Bursaspor
Lietkabelis (Lithuanian Basketball Federation)	97–98	(French Federation of Basketball) **Paris Basketball**
**Joventut** (Spanish Basketball Federation)	89–78	(British Basketball) London Lions
**Hapoel Tel Aviv** (Israeli Basketball Association)	90–80	(Italian Basketball Federation) Umana Reyer Venezia

==== Matches ====
11 April 2023	**Prometey** (Ukraine)	**87**–79	(Germany) Hamburg Towers	Riga
18:00	Scoring by quarter: **28**–20, 20–20, **21**–16, 18–**23**
	Pts: Sydorov 21; Rebs: Stephens 9 Asts: Clavell 7 PIR: Balvín 25	Boxscore	Pts: Childs, Cleary 19; Rebs: Childs 12; Asts: Samar 5 PIR: Childs 23	Arena: Arena Riga (Note: Due to the Russian invasion of Ukraine, Ukrainian teams were required to play their home matches at neutral venues. Therefore, Prometey played at Arena Riga, Riga, Latvia, instead of their regular arena Sportkompleks Slobozhanskyy, Slobozhanske.); Attendance: 1,708; Referees: Carlos Cortes (SPA), Artūras Šukys (LTU), Sébastien Clivaz (SUI)

12 April 2023	Lietkabelis (Lithuania)	97–**98**	(France) **Paris Basketball**	Panevėžys
18:00	Scoring by quarter: **24**–19, 21–**27**, **29**–25, 23–**27**
	Pts: Morris 23; Rebs: Lipkevičius 9 Asts: Kullamäe 5 PIR: Golomán 24	Boxscore	Pts: Begarin 22; Rebs: Kamagate 9 Asts: Wallace 10; PIR: Wallace 24	Arena: Kalnapilis Arena; Attendance: 4,261; Referees: Miguel Ángel Pérez (SPA), Igor Dragojević (SRB), Denis Hadžić (BIH)

12 April 2023	**ratiopharm Ulm** (Germany)	**92**–83	(Montenegro) Budućnost VOLI	Neu-Ulm
19:30	Scoring by quarter: 16–**30**, **26**–23, **26**–9, **24**–21
	Pts: Caboclo 19; Rebs: Caboclo 11; Asts: Yago 7 PIR: Caboclo 24	Boxscore	Pts: Green 29; Rebs: Kaba 11; Asts: Bell-Haynes 10; PIR: Green 30	Arena: Ratiopharm Arena; Attendance: 2,663; Referees: Daniel Hierrenzuelo (SPA), Leandro Lezcano (ARG), Huseyin Celik (TUR)

12 April 2023	**Joventut** (Spain)	**89**–78	(United Kingdom) London Lions	Badalona
20:00	Scoring by quarter: **19**–12, **20**–19, 25–**27**, **25**–20
	Pts: Tomić 16; Rebs: Tomić 9 Asts: Guy 7 PIR: Tomić 24	Boxscore	Pts: Zubčić 19; Rebs: four players 3 Asts: Nelson, Oni 5 PIR: Zubčić 22	Arena: Palau Badalona; Attendance: 7,105; Referees: Saša Pukl (SLO), Maxime Boubert (FRA), Noam Gordon (ISR)

12 April 2023	**Hapoel Tel Aviv** (Israel)	**90**–80	(Italy) Umana Reyer Venezia	Tel Aviv
20:00	Scoring by quarter: **24**–16, **24**–16, **29**–23, 15–**25**
	Pts: Munford, Timor 13; Rebs: Munford 9 Asts: Brown 8 PIR: Munford 18	Boxscore	Pts: Granger 18; Rebs: three players 5 Asts: De Nicolao 4 PIR: Granger, Willis 21	Arena: Shlomo Group Arena; Attendance: 3,475; Referees: Anne Panther (GER), Hughues Thepenier (FRA), Marko Juras (SRB)

12 April 2023	**Promitheas** (Greece)	**89**–75	(France) Mincidelice JL Bourg	Patras
20:00	Scoring by quarter: **24**–13, 17–**20**, 20–**22**, **28**–20
	Pts: Cowan, Kulboka 20; Rebs: Conditt, Cowan 6 Asts: Cowan 10; PIR: Cowan 32	Boxscore	Pts: Floyd 16; Rebs: Pelos 10; Asts: Julien 9 PIR: Pelos 19	Arena: Dimitris Tofalos Arena; Attendance: 1,459; Referees: Gytis Vilius (LTU), Jakub Zamojski (POL), Eduard Udyanskyy (GBR)

12 April 2023	**Gran Canaria** (Spain)	**72**–66	(Turkey) Frutti Extra Bursaspor	Las Palmas
21:15	Scoring by quarter: 14–**18**, **19**–17, **17**–14, **22**–17
	Pts: Shurna 17; Rebs: Brussino 7 Asts: Albicy 5 PIR: Shurna 18	Boxscore	Pts: Bitim 22; Rebs: Auguste 14; Asts: Clemmons, Dudzinski 3 PIR: Auguste 22	Arena: Gran Canaria Arena; Attendance: 6,203; Referees: Mehdi Difallah (FRA), Sérgio Silva (POR), Thomas Bissuel (FRA)

13 April 2023	**Türk Telekom** (Turkey)	**77**–69	(Italy) Germani Brescia	Ankara
18:45	Scoring by quarter: **17**–15, 19–**23**, **23**–20, **18**–11
	Pts: Bouteille 21; Rebs: Yılmaz 12; Asts: Grant, Taylor 6 PIR: Jones 25	Boxscore	Pts: Massinburg 20; Rebs: Gabriel 8 Asts: Della Valle 5 PIR: Massinburg 20	Arena: Ankara Arena; Attendance: 6,296; Referees: Oļegs Latiševs (LAT), Robert Vyklický (CZE), Dragan Porobić (BIH)

=== Quarterfinals ===
==== Summary ====
The quarterfinals were played on 19 April 2023.

Team 1	Score	Team 2
**Prometey** (Basketball Federation of Ukraine)	80–57	(Hellenic Basketball Federation) Promitheas
**Türk Telekom** (Turkish Basketball Federation)	86–76	(German Basketball Federation) ratiopharm Ulm
**Gran Canaria** (Spanish Basketball Federation)	104–74	(French Federation of Basketball) Paris Basketball
**Joventut** (Spanish Basketball Federation)	82–74	(Israeli Basketball Association) Hapoel Tel Aviv

==== Matches ====
19 April 2023	**Prometey** (Ukraine)	**80**–57	(Greece) Promitheas	Riga
18:00	Scoring by quarter: **25**–16, **18**–13, **19**–11, **18**–17
	Pts: Stephens 17; Rebs: Balvín 8 Asts: Agada 7 PIR: Stephens 15	Boxscore	Pts: Thomasson 15; Rebs: Dangubić 5 Asts: Cowan 4 PIR: Conditt, Thomasson 15	Arena: Arena Riga; Attendance: 2,427; Referees: Mehdi Difallah (FRA), Tomasz Trawicki (POL), Dragan Porobić (BIH)

19 April 2023	**Türk Telekom** (Turkey)	**86**–76	(Germany) ratiopharm Ulm	Ankara
17:30	Scoring by quarter: 14–**22**, **20**–15, 16–**20**, **36**–19
	Pts: Grant, Jones 20; Rebs: Sestina 8 Asts: Grant 7 PIR: Grant 31	Boxscore	Pts: dos Santos 21; Rebs: Caboclo 10; Asts: dos Santos 5 PIR: Caboclo 26	Arena: Ankara Arena; Attendance: 6,723; Referees: Milan Nedović (SVN), Joseph Bissang (FRA), Adar Peer (ISR)

19 April 2023	**Gran Canaria** (Spain)	**104**–74	(France) Paris Basketball	Las Palmas
21:45	Scoring by quarter: **32**–30, **29**–18, **21**–12, **22**–14
	Pts: Inglis 23; Rebs: five players 4 Asts: Bassas 5 PIR: Inglis 25	Boxscore	Pts: Bégarin 18; Rebs: Kamagate 6 Asts: Wallace 5 PIR: Kamagate 18	Arena: Gran Canaria Arena; Attendance: 8,093; Referees: Robert Lottermoser (GER), Luka Kardum (CRO), Eduard Udyanskyy (GBR)

19 April 2023	**Joventut** (Spain)	**82**–74	(Israel) Hapoel Tel Aviv	Badalona
20:00	Scoring by quarter: **22**–7, 18–**22**, 20–**22**, 22–**23**
	Pts: Brodziansky, Tomić 16; Rebs: Feliz 8 Asts: Guy 8 PIR: Brodziansky, Tomić 22	Boxscore	Pts: Brown 21; Rebs: Onuaku 10; Asts: Brown 4 PIR: Brown 23	Arena: Palau Badalona; Attendance: 7,217; Referees: Gytis Vilius (LTU), Tomislav Hordov (CRO), Rain Peerandi (EST)

=== Semifinals ===
==== Summary ====
The semifinals were played on 26 April 2023.

Team 1	Score	Team 2
Prometey (Basketball Federation of Ukraine)	74–76	(Turkish Basketball Federation) **Türk Telekom**
**Gran Canaria** (Spanish Basketball Federation)	89–86	(Spanish Basketball Federation) Joventut

==== Matches ====
26 April 2023	Prometey (Ukraine)	74–**76**	(Turkey) **Türk Telekom**	Riga
18:00	Scoring by quarter: **25**–16, 13–**25**, 18–**20**, **18**–15
	Pts: Clavell 19; Rebs: Balvín 9 Asts: Balvín 5 PIR: Balvín 20	Boxscore	Pts: Grant 19; Rebs: Jones 14; Asts: Grant 6 PIR: Bouteille 22	Arena: Arena Riga; Attendance: 4,344; Referees: Matej Boltauzer (SVN), Piotr Pastusiak (POL), Saulius Racys (LTU)

26 April 2023	**Gran Canaria** (Spain)	**89**–86	(Spain) Joventut	Las Palmas
21:00	Scoring by quarter: **16**–15, 24–**28**, **23**–13, 24–**30**
	Pts: Albicy 17; Rebs: Diop 6 Asts: Slaughter 6 PIR: Brussino 20	Boxscore	Pts: Feliz 21; Rebs: Brodziansky, Tomić 7 Asts: Feliz 6 PIR: Feliz 23	Arena: Gran Canaria Arena; Attendance: 8,936; Referees: Milivoje Jovčić (SRB), Amit Balak (ISR), Gentian Cici (ALB)

=== Final ===
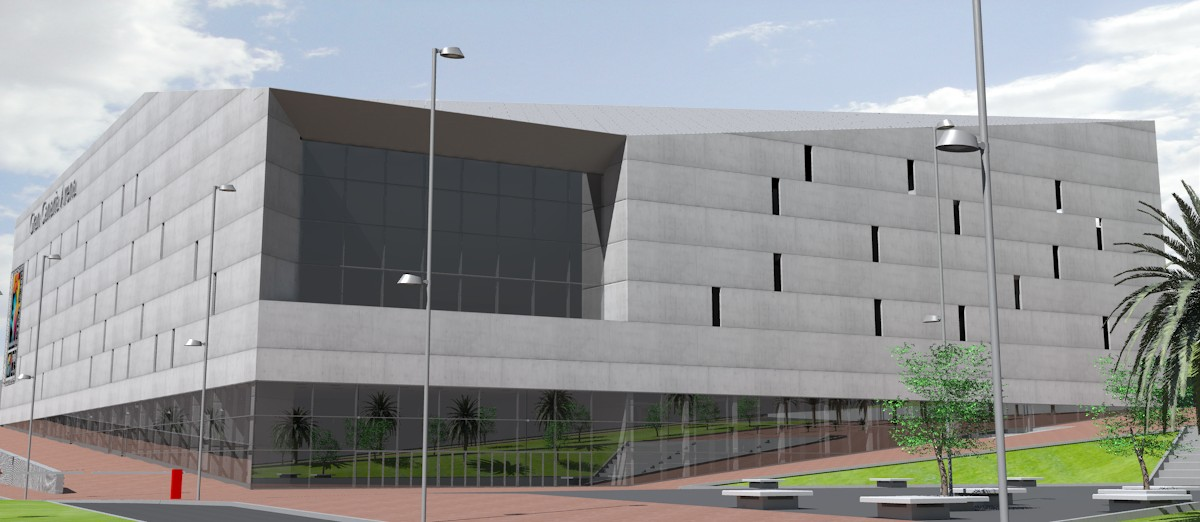

==== Summary ====
The final was played on 3 May 2023 at the Gran Canaria Arena in Las Palmas.

Team 1	Score	Team 2
**Gran Canaria** (Spanish Basketball Federation)	71–67	(Turkish Basketball Federation) Türk Telekom

==== Match details ====
3 May 2023	**Gran Canaria** (Spanish Basketball Federation)	**71**–67	(Turkish Basketball Federation) Türk Telekom	Las Palmas
21:00	Scoring by quarter: **29**–23, **21**–10, 11–**22**, 10–**12**
	Pts: Shurna 18; Rebs: Balcerowski 5 Asts: Albicy, Slaughter 3 PIR: Albicy 18	Boxscore	Pts: Bouteille, Jones 17; Rebs: Jones 11; Asts: Grant, Taylor 4 PIR: Jones 27	Arena: Gran Canaria Arena; Attendance: 9,869; Referees: Saša Pukl, Rain Peerandi, Anne Panther

== Awards ==
=== EuroCup MVP ===
Player	Team	Ref.
(United States) Jerian Grant	(Turkish Basketball Federation) Türk Telekom	

=== EuroCup Final MVP ===
Player	Team	Ref.
(United States) John Shurna	(Spanish Basketball Federation) Gran Canaria	

=== All–7DAYS EuroCup Teams ===
All–7DAYS EuroCup First Team		All–7DAYS EuroCup Second Team		Ref
Player	Team	Player	Team	Ref
(United States) Jerian Grant	(Turkish Basketball Federation) Türk Telekom	(United States) J'Covan Brown	(Israeli Basketball Association) Hapoel Tel Aviv	
(United States) D. J. Stephens	(Basketball Federation of Ukraine) Prometey	(Turkey) Onuralp Bitim	(Turkish Basketball Federation) Frutti Extra Bursaspor	
(France) Axel Bouteille	(Turkish Basketball Federation) Türk Telekom	(United States) Sam Dekker	(British Basketball) London Lions	
(United States) John Shurna	(Spanish Basketball Federation) Gran Canaria	(Brazil) Bruno Caboclo	(German Basketball Federation) ratiopharm Ulm	
(Croatia) Ante Tomić	(Spanish Basketball Federation) Joventut	(United States) Tyrique Jones	(Turkish Basketball Federation) Türk Telekom	

=== Coach of the Year ===
Coach	Team	Ref.
(Turkey) Erdem Can	(Turkey) Türk Telekom	

=== Rising Star ===
Player	Team	Ref.
(Poland) Aleksander Balcerowski	(Spanish Basketball Federation) Gran Canaria	

=== MVP of the round ===
==== Regular season ====
Round	Player	Team	PIR	Ref.
1	(Lithuania) Arnoldas Kulboka	(Hellenic Basketball Federation) Promitheas Patras	31	
2	(United States) J'Covan Brown	(Israel) Hapoel Tel Aviv	39	
2	(United Kingdom) Ovie Soko	(United Kingdom) London Lions	39	
2	(United States) Joe Young	(Greece) Promitheas Patras	39	
3	(United States) Jordan Floyd	(French Federation of Basketball) Mincidelice JL Bourg en Bresse	31	
4	(United States) (France) Jaylen Hoard	(Israeli Basketball Association) Hapoel Tel Aviv	33	
5	(United States) Dave Dudzinski	(Turkish Basketball Federation) Frutti Extra Bursaspor	28	
6	(France) Ismaël Kamagate	(French Federation of Basketball) Paris Basketball	41	
7	(United States) Derek Willis	(Italian Basketball Federation) Umana Reyer Venezia	31	
8	(Czech Republic) Ondřej Balvín	(Basketball Federation of Ukraine) Prometey	34	
9	(United States) Jordan McRae	(Israeli Basketball Association) Hapoel Tel Aviv	32	
10	(United States) Jordan McRae (2)	(Israeli Basketball Association) Hapoel Tel Aviv	40	
11	(United States) J'Covan Brown (2)	(Israel) Hapoel Tel Aviv	33	
12	(Lithuania) Arnoldas Kulboka (2)	(Greece) Promitheas Patras	36	
13	(United States) Chinanu Onuaku	(Israel) Hapoel Tel Aviv	35	
14	(United States) Jordan McRae (3)	(Israeli Basketball Association) Hapoel Tel Aviv	31	
15	(United States) Mitchell Watt	(Italian Basketball Federation) Umana Reyer Venezia	34	
16	(United States) Anthony Cowan	(Hellenic Basketball Federation) Promitheas Patras	34	
17	(United States) Anthony Cowan (2)	(Hellenic Basketball Federation) Promitheas Patras	38	
18	(United States) (France) Jaylen Hoard (2)	(Israeli Basketball Association) Hapoel Tel Aviv	34	

==== Playoffs ====
Round	Player	Team	PIR	Ref.
Eighthfinals	(United States) Anthony Cowan	(Hellenic Basketball Federation) Promitheas Patras	32	
Quarterfinals	(United States) Jerian Grant	(Turkish Basketball Federation) Türk Telekom	31	
Semifinals	(France) Axel Bouteille	(Turkish Basketball Federation) Türk Telekom	22	

== See also ==
- 2022–23 EuroLeague
- 2022–23 Basketball Champions League
- 2022–23 FIBA Europe Cup
