= 2024–25 Paris Basketball season =

The 2024–25 Paris Basketball season is the 7th season of Paris Basketball, their 4th season in the LNB Élite, and is their first season in the European top-level EuroLeague. The club is participating in the LNB Élite, LNB Pro A Leaders Cup, French Basketball Cup, and in the EuroLeague this season. It is the second season playing in the Adidas Arena, which was inaugurated the previous season. It is the first season under new head coach Tiago Splitter, who replaced Tuomas Iisalo.

Paris Basketball drew an average home attendance of 7,044 in the 2024-25 EuroLeague.

== Overview ==
Coming off of their first EuroCup championship, on 17 June, EuroLeague Basketball officially confirmed Paris' participation in the 2024–25 EuroLeague. Jérôme de Chaunac was appointed Chief Business Officer (CBO) in September.

== Roster ==
=== Overview ===
Paris Basketball roster
Players
Coaches

Pos.	No.	Nat.	Name	Ht.		Age
PG	0	(North Macedonia)	Shorts, T. J.	1.75 m (5 ft 9 in)	73 kg (161 lb)	28 – 15 October 1997
G/F	1	(United States)	Malcolm, Collin	2.01 m (6 ft 7 in)	98 kg (216 lb)	28 – 2 July 1997
G	2	(France)	Hifi, Nadir	1.84 m (6 ft 0 in)	82 kg (181 lb)	23 – 16 July 2002
SF	3	(United States)	Ward, Tyson	1.98 m (6 ft 6 in)	86 kg (190 lb)	28 – 26 July 1997
PF	4	(France)	Cavalière, Léopold	2.03 m (6 ft 8 in)	95 kg (209 lb)	29 – 27 April 1996
F/C	5	(France)	Sy, Bandja	2.05 m (6 ft 9 in)	100 kg (220 lb)	35 – 30 July 1990
SG	7	(Chile)	Herrera, Sebastian	1.93 m (6 ft 4 in)	86 kg (190 lb)	28 – 1 November 1997
C	8	(Germany)	Kratzer, Leon	2.11 m (6 ft 11 in)	110 kg (243 lb)	29 – 4 February 1997
G/F	9	(France)	Denis, Gauthier	2.01 m (6 ft 7 in)		28 – 1 April 1997
G	12	(Germany)	Lô, Maodo	1.91 m (6 ft 3 in)	82 kg (181 lb)	33 – 31 December 1992
C	13	(Central African Republic)	Hayes, Kevarrius	2.06 m (6 ft 9 in)	103 kg (227 lb)	28 – 5 March 1997
F/C	18	(France)	Shahrvin, Enzo	2.00 m (6 ft 7 in)		23 – 13 February 2003
PF	20	(Finland)	Jantunen, Mikael	2.03 m (6 ft 8 in)	100 kg (220 lb)	25 – 20 April 2000
G/F	24	(France) (Ghana)	Ouattara, Yakuba	1.92 m (6 ft 4 in)	84 kg (185 lb)	34 – 24 January 1992
PF	34	(United States)	Hommes, Daulton	2.03 m (6 ft 8 in)	98 kg (216 lb)	29 – 4 July 1996

Head coach

- (Brazil) Tiago Splitter

Assistant coach(es)

- (Hungary) Adrián Kovács
- (France) Bienvenue Kindoki
- (France) Emmanuel Mavomo

Legend

- (C) Team captain
- Injured

- Roster
Updated: June 24, 2024

=== Depth chart ===
Pos.	Starting 5	Bench 1	Bench 2
C	Kevarrius Hayes	Leon Kratzer	Daulton Hommes
PF	Mikael Jantunen	Bandja Sy	Enzo Shahrvin
SF	Tyson Ward	Léopold Cavalière	Gauthier Denis
SG	Nadir Hifi	Yakuba Ouattara	Sebastian Herrera
PG	T. J. Shorts	Maodo Lô

== Pre-season ==
Paris Basketball began its pre-season on 27 August 2024. They also faced fellow EuroLeague tema Partizan, losing on a game winner by Brandon Davies.

27 August 2024	Paris Basketball	Cancelled	Évreux	Paris
				Arena: Halle Carpentier

6 September 2024 Epicbet Cup	Kalev (Estonia)	64–97	(France) Paris Basketball	Tallinn, Estonia
		Report

8 September 2024 Epicbet Cup	Paris Basketball (France)	85–77	(Spain) Bilbao Basket	Tallinn, Estonia
		Report

15 September 2024	Paris Basketball (France)	63–71	(Greece) AEK Athens	Belgrade, Serbia
		Report

16 September 2024	Partizan (Serbia)	83–82	(France) Paris Basketball	Belgrade, Serbia
		Report
