= Sebastián Herrera (basketball) =

Chilean-German basketball player, born 1997

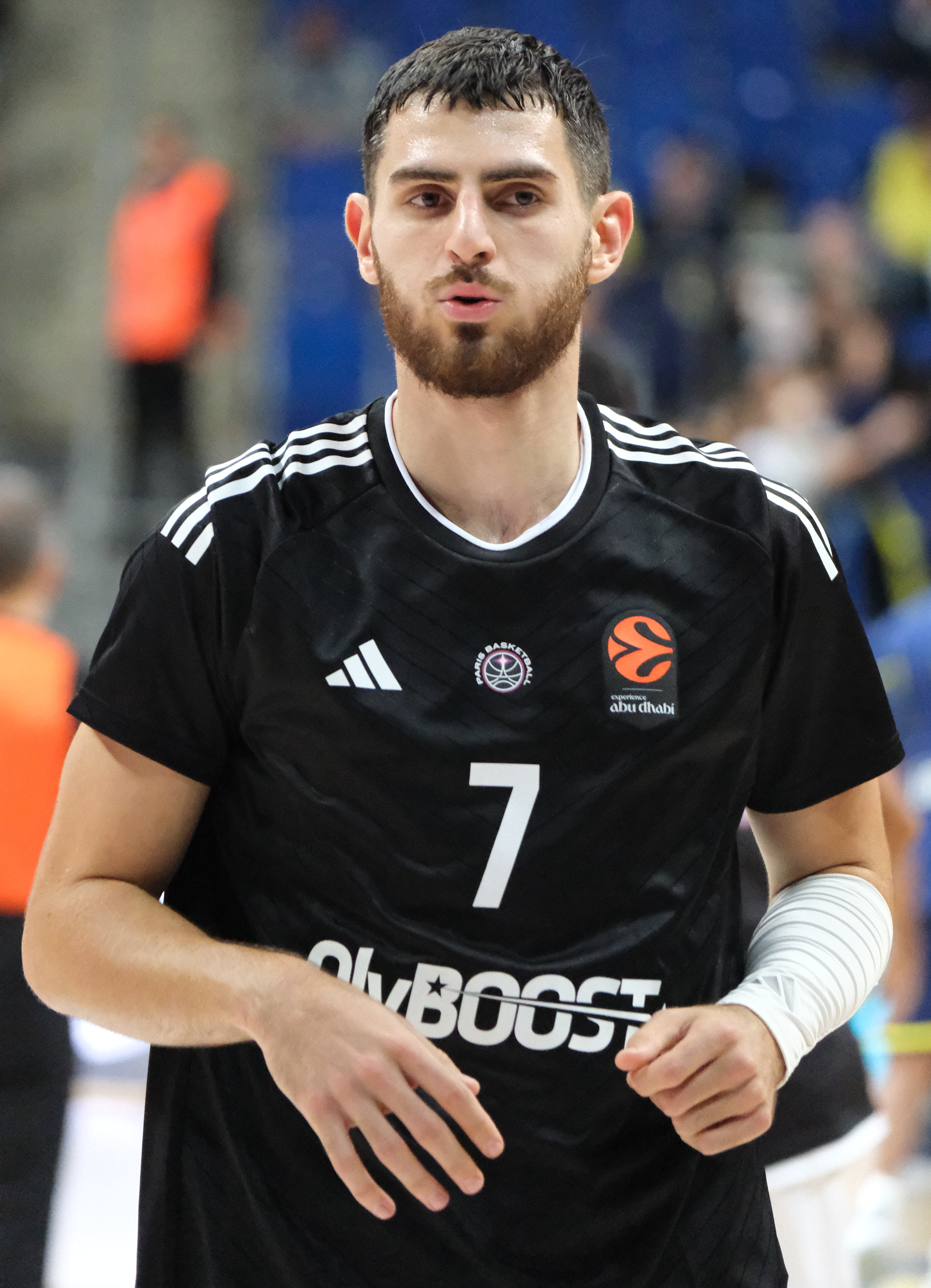
- Herrera with Paris in 2025

No. 7 – Paris Basketball
- Position: Shooting guard / small forward
- League: LNB Élite; EuroLeague

Personal information
- Born: 1 November 1997 (age 29) Vitacura, Chile
- Listed height: 1.93 m (6 ft 4 in)
- Listed weight: 90 kg (198 lb)

Career information
- Playing career: 2015–present

Career history
- 2015–2017: Gladiators Trier
- 2017–2020: Crailsheim Merlins
- 2020–2022: EWE Baskets Oldenburg
- 2022–2023: Telekom Baskets Bonn
- 2023–present: Paris Basketball

Career highlights
- EuroCup champion (2024); FIBA Champions League champion (2023); LNB Élite champion (2025); French Cup winner (2025); French League Cup winner (2024)

Sebastián Esteban Herrera Kratzborn (born 1 November 1997) is a Chilean-German professional basketball player and the team captain for Paris Basketball in the LNB Élite and the EuroLeague. He has also played for the Chile national team.

== Early life ==
Herrera was born on 1 November 1997 in the commune of Vitacura, Chile, to a Chilean father and a German mother who has lived in Chile for over 40 years.

== Professional career ==
After starting his career in German second-tier team Gladiators Treves in 2015, Herrera joined Crailsheim Merlins in 2017, coached by Tuomas Iisalo. At the end of the season they were promoted to Basketball Bundesliga, and Herrera played with Merlins until 2020, when he moved to EWE Baskets Oldenburg.

For the 2022–23 season, he reunited with coach Iisalo after signing with Telekom Baskets Bonn. They went on to win the 2022–23 FIBA Champions League title.

In 2023, he followed coach Iisalo to French team Paris Basketball. They won the 2023–24 EuroCup title, and were promoted to EuroLeague. Next season Herrera debuted in EuroLeague on 15 October 2024, in a home win against reigning champions Panathinaikos. After the 2024–25 season, he signed a two-year contract extension with Paris.

== National team career ==
Herrera has played for the Chile national basketball team since 2016, representing Chile in South American Basketball Championship, FIBA World Cup qualifiers, FIBA Americup qualifiers and FIBA Olympic qualifying tournament.

== Career statistics ==
Legend
GP	Games played	GS	Games started	MPG	Minutes per game
FG%	Field goal percentage	3P%	3-point field goal percentage	FT%	Free throw percentage
RPG	Rebounds per game	APG	Assists per game	SPG	Steals per game
BPG	Blocks per game	PPG	Points per game	**Bold**	Career high

†	Denotes season in which Herrera won the EuroCup
†	Denotes season in which Herrera won the Champions League

=== EuroLeague ===
Year	Team	GP	GS	MPG	FG%	3P%	FT%	RPG	APG	SPG	BPG	PPG	PIR
2024–25	Paris	17	9	11.5	.333	.333	.800	1.1	.5	.4	.0	4.0	1.8

=== EuroCup ===
Year	Team	GP	GS	MPG	FG%	3P%	FT%	RPG	APG	SPG	BPG	PPG	PIR
2023–24†	Paris	16	12	19.0	.416	.441	.833	1.3	1.8	.8	.2	6.2	5.6

=== FIBA Champions League ===
Year	Team	GP	GS	MPG	FG%	3P%	FT%	RPG	APG	SPG	BPG	PPG
2021–22	Oldenburg	6		20.2	**.500**	**.444**	**1.000**	**3.0**	1.8	**.8**	**.2**	5.0
2022–23†	Bonn	**17**		**22.0**	.417	.409	.895	1.8	**2.0**	**.8**	**.2**	**9.4**
