= David Kahn (sports executive) =

American sports executive

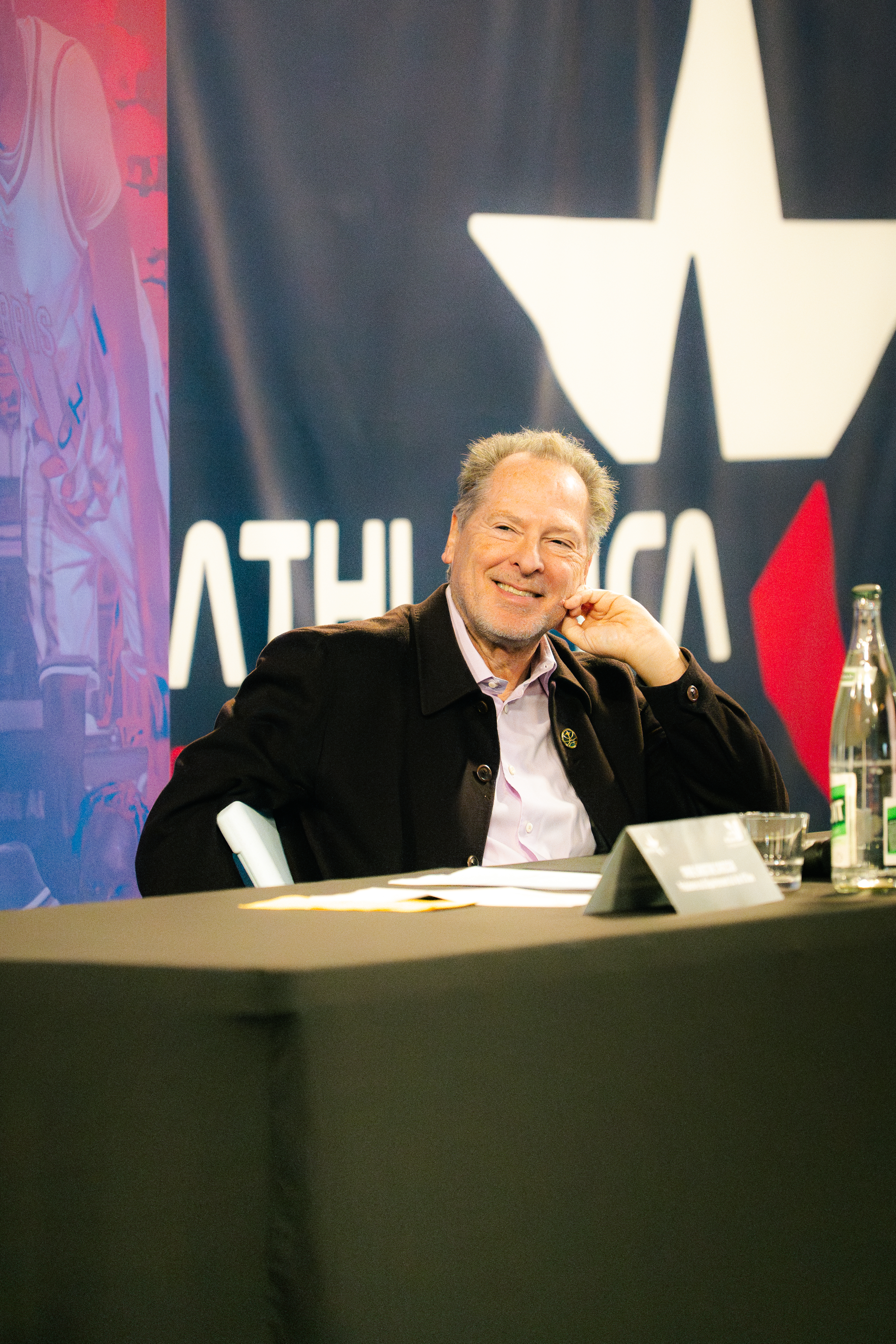
- Kahn in 2025
- Born: July 30, 1961 (age 65); Portland, Oregon
- Education: UCLA; NYU Law
- Occupation: President
- Organisation: Paris Basketball

David Kahn (born July 30, 1961) is an American sports executive, attorney, and former sportswriter. He is the former president of basketball operations for the Minnesota Timberwolves of the National Basketball Association and is the current president of Paris Basketball currently representing both the LNB Élite and the EuroLeague. Of most note, in the 2009 NBA draft, he twice passed on drafting Stephen Curry, instead choosing 2 other point guards (Ricky Rubio at #5 and then Jonny Flynn at #6).

== Early life and career ==
Kahn was born to a Jewish family in Portland, Oregon with three siblings Robert Kahn, now living in Jerusalem, Steven Kahn, a personal injury lawyer in Portland, and Sarah Kahn Glass. His father, Garry L. Kahn, was the founder of personal injury firm Kahn & Kahn which his brother now runs.

He attended Woodrow Wilson High School (Portland, Oregon) before matriculating to UCLA, where he graduated with a degree in English in 1983. While at UCLA, he was sports editor for the Daily Bruin for two years and a Los Angeles Times intern. Upon his graduation, he returned to his hometown of Portland and worked as a sportswriter for The Oregonian from 1983 through 1989, where he covered the local and national sports scene, including the NBA's Portland Trail Blazers.

After leaving the Oregonian, Kahn received his J.D. degree from NYU and worked with Proskauer Rose, the same law firm that represents the big four North American sports leagues (NFL, NBA, MLB, and NHL) in many of their legal matters, for several years.

== Basketball career ==
=== National Basketball Association ===
Kahn was hired by the Indiana Pacers of the National Basketball Association (NBA) in 1995, remaining with the organization until 2004, working mostly on the business side of the franchise. After his tenure with the Pacers, Kahn returned to Portland and spearheaded an effort to lure the Montreal Expos or another major-league team to Portland; the Expos ultimately relocated to Washington, D.C., and became the Nationals. Kahn's attempts to bring Major League Baseball to Portland were unsuccessful. Kahn was also involved in real estate ventures in the Portland area. In 2005, he purchased several teams in the NBA D-League.

2009 NBA Draft

On May 22, 2009, Kahn was hired by the Minnesota Timberwolves as president of basketball operations to replace Kevin McHale. In the 2009 NBA draft, Minnesota held the #5 and #6 picks. Kahn selected point guard Ricky Rubio at #5 and then Jonny Flynn at #6, thus twice passing on selecting on Stephen Curry, who was selected by the Golden State Warriors at #7. Although Rubio went on to have a long NBA career, Flynn played only two seasons. Curry (as of 2022) became a multiple-time All-Star, All-NBA, Finals MVP, MVP, all-time three-point leader, and league champion. Kahn has had little to say about passing on Curry. When asked in 2019, he deflected, noting that many other teams had also passed on Curry. Despite Minnesota having the #5 and #6 picks meaning only four out of the 28 other NBA teams besides Minnesota and Golden State passed on him.

Curry himself (in 2018 on the Ringer and 2022 on Draymond Green's podcast) relayed the rumor that his love of golf and Minnesota's inclement weather was a reason Kahn / Minnesota passed on him.

Kahn also drafted multiple players who are considered busts, such as Wesley Johnson and Derrick Williams. Echoing comments some columnists made after Kahn made several controversial moves in the summer of 2010, ESPN writers Chad Ford and John Hollinger called his tenure "baffling".

On May 2, 2013, Kahn was released from the Timberwolves after they did not exercise their option on his contract, instead hiring Flip Saunders for a second stint with the team.

=== France ===
On July 12, 2018, Kahn was announced as the president of Paris Basketball in the LNB Pro B. In 2021, Kahn's Paris Basketball team was promoted to the LNB Pro A after gaining the second-best record in the 2020–21 LNB Pro B season behind only Fos Provence Basket. During the 2023–24 LNB Élite season, under his leadership behind the scenes, Paris Basketball would win both the EuroCup Championship and the LNB Élite Leaders Cup, as well as be the runners-up to the championship-winning AS Monaco Basket in that season's playoffs.
