= Ismaël Kamagate =

French basketball player (born 2001)

- Kamagate with Beşiktaş in 2026

No. 17 – Openjobmetis Varese
- Position: Center
- League: LBA; Champions League

Personal information
- Born: 17 January 2001 (age 25) Paris, France
- Listed height: 2.11 m (6 ft 11 in)
- Listed weight: 100 kg (220 lb)

Career information
- NBA draft: 2022: 2nd round, 46th overall pick
- Drafted by: Detroit Pistons
- Playing career: 2019–present

Career history
- 2019–2023: Paris Basketball
- 2023–2025: Olimpia Milano
- 2024–2025: →Derthona
- 2025–2026: Beşiktaş
- 2026–present: Varese

Career highlights
- All-FIBA Champions League First Team (2025); EuroCup blocks leader (2023); LNB Pro A Best Defender (2022); LNB Pro A Domestic Player of the Year (2022); LNB All-Star (2021)
- Stats at NBA.com
- Stats at Basketball Reference

Ismaël Sindou Kamagate (born 17 January 2001) is an Ivorian-French professional basketball player for Pallacanestro Varese of the Lega Basket Serie A (LBA). His draft rights are retained by the Cleveland Cavaliers of the National Basketball Association (NBA).

== Early life and career ==
Kamagate was born in the 19th arrondissement of Paris to Ivorian parents. He grew up playing football as a goalkeeper, which he did not enjoy, before being introduced to basketball by age 11 at the Jeunesse Athlétique de Montrouge. At age 12, Kamagate began playing basketball for a local youth club Basket Paris 14 and he moved to Paris-Levallois three years later. In 2017, he started a two-season stint with Orléans Loiret, competing for the club's under-18 and second teams.

== Professional career ==
On 27 July 2019, Kamagate signed with Paris Basketball of the LNB Pro B. In his first season with the club, he split playing time between the Pro B and with Centre Fédéral de Basket-ball in the Nationale Masculine 1. In the 2021–22 season, his team was promoted to the LNB Pro A and he assumed a greater role. On 9 October 2021, Kamagate posted 18 points, nine blocks and five rebounds in a 98–97 loss to Chorale Roanne. He became the fifth player in league history with at least nine blocks in a game and was one short of Derrick Lewis' record (10). Kamagate was selected to play in the LNB All-Star Game, where he was the youngest player. He was named LNB Pro A Best Defender for the season.

On 16 August 2022, Kamagate, along with other Frenchman draftee Juhann Begarin returned for another year with the Paris Basketball.

On 19 July 2023, Kamagate signed a two-year deal with Italian powerhouse Olimpia Milano. On 16 January 2024, he was loaned to Derthona Basket. On June 28, 2024, it was announced, his loan contract with Derthona Basket has been extended for one more year.

On July 11, 2025, Kamagate signed with Beşiktaş Gain of the Turkish Basketbol Süper Ligi.

On July 29, 2026, he signed with Pallacanestro Varese of the Lega Basket Serie A (LBA).

=== NBA rights ===
On 22 April 2022, Kamagate declared for the 2022 NBA draft, where analysts considered him a possible first-round pick.

On 23 June 2022, Kamagate was selected by the Detroit Pistons with the 46th pick. He was then traded to the Portland Trail Blazers and then to the Denver Nuggets. On 8 February 2024, his rights were acquired by the Los Angeles Clippers. On 20 August 2026, his rights were acquired by the Cleveland Cavaliers in a five-team trade.

== National team career ==
Kamagate represented France at the 2019 FIBA U18 European Championship in Greece, where he averaged 4.6 points and 3.9 rebounds per game. At the 2021 FIBA U20 European Challengers, he averaged 10.2 points, 3.8 rebounds, and 2.4 blocks per game.

== Career statistics ==
Legend
GP	Games played	GS	Games started	MPG	Minutes per game
FG%	Field-goal percentage	3P%	3-point field-goal percentage	FT%	Free-throw percentage
RPG	Rebounds per game	APG	Assists per game	SPG	Steals per game
BPG	Blocks per game	PPG	Points per game	PIR	Performance index rating
**Bold**	Career high

=== EuroLeague ===
Year	Team	GP	GS	MPG	FG%	3P%	FT%	RPG	APG	SPG	BPG	PPG	PIR
2023–24	Olimpia Milano	9	1	2.6	.556	—	.000	.2	.1	—	—	1.1	.7
Career		9	1	2.6	.556	—	.000	.2	.1	—	—	1.1	.7
