= Daulton Hommes =

American basketball player (born 1996)

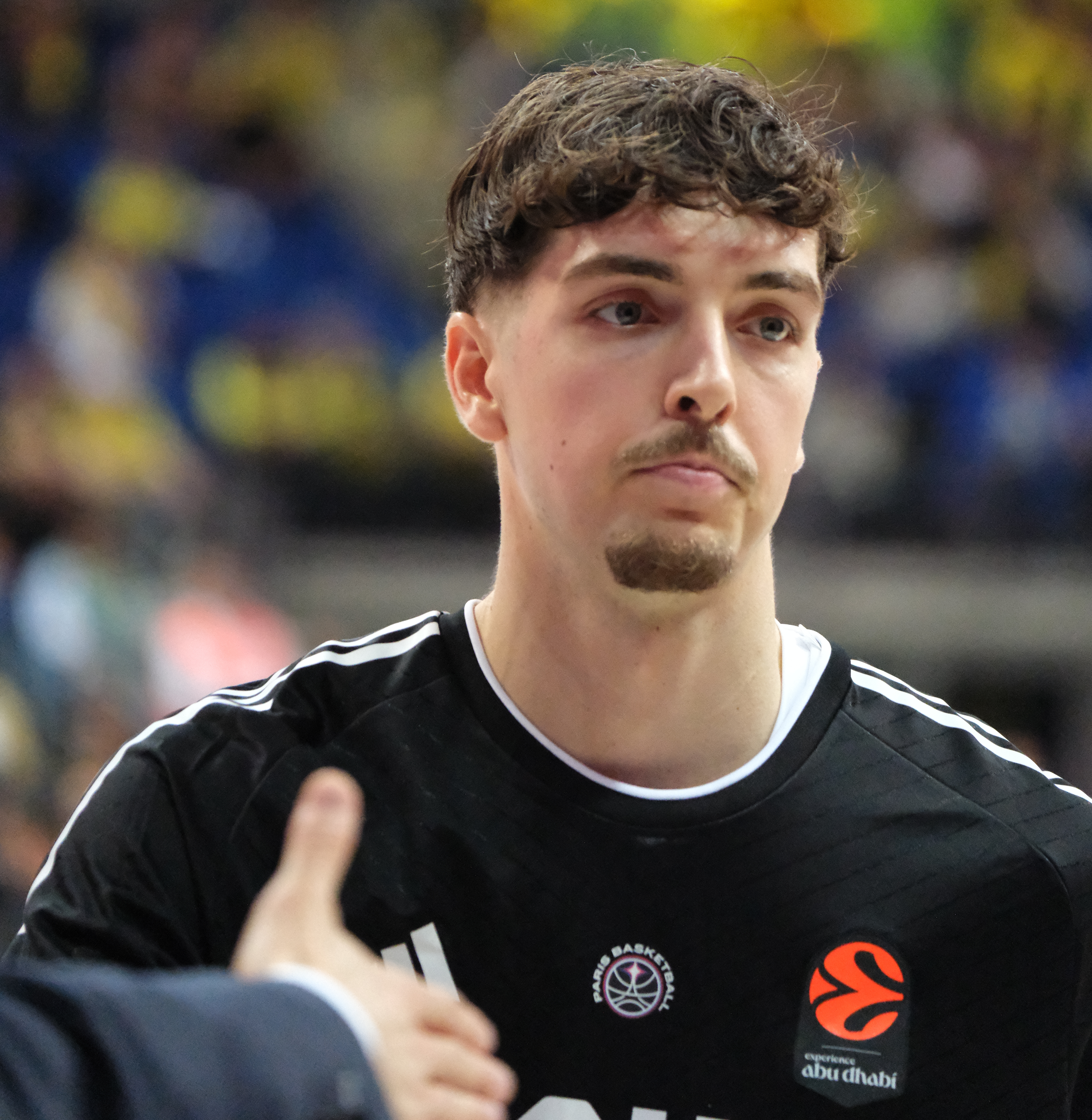
- Hommes with Paris Basketball in 2025

No. 34 – Paris Basketball
- Position: Power forward
- League: LNB Pro A EuroLeague

Personal information
- Born: July 4, 1996 (age 30) Bellingham, Washington, U.S.
- Listed height: 6 ft 8 in (2.03 m)
- Listed weight: 215 lb (98 kg)

Career information
- High school: Lynden Christian (Lynden, Washington)
- College: Western Washington (2016–2018); Point Loma Nazarene (2018–2019)
- NBA draft: 2019: undrafted
- Playing career: 2019–present

Career history
- 2019–2020: Austin Spurs
- 2020–2021: Vanoli Cremona
- 2022: Birmingham Squadron
- 2022–2023: Saski Baskonia
- 2024: Aquila Basket Trento
- 2024–present: Paris Basketball

Career highlights
- NABC Division II Player of the Year (2019); First-team Division II All-American (2019); PacWest Player of the Year (2019); First-team All-PacWest (2019); First-team All-GNAC (2018)
- Stats at NBA.com
- Stats at Basketball Reference

Daulton Hommes (born July 4, 1996) is an American professional basketball player for Paris Basketball of the LNB Pro A and the EuroLeague. After graduating high school, he played college basketball for Point Loma Nazarene University, where he was named the NABC Division II National Player of the Year for the 2018–19 season.

== College career ==
After missing his junior and senior seasons at Lynden Christian High School due to an ACL injury, Hommes signed with NCAA Division II school Western Washington as a walk-on, where he also sat out his freshman season to heal. He made his college debut in the 2016–17 season, averaging 12.5 points per game and earning All-Great Northwest Athletic Conference (GNAC) honorable mention recognition. In his sophomore season, Hommes averaged 18.1 points per game and was a unanimous All-GNAC pick. Following the 2017–18 season, he decided to transfer to Point Loma Nazarene.

In the 2018–19 season, Hommes joined the Sea Lions as a starter. He averaged 21.9 points and 5.8 rebounds per game and led the team to Pacific West Conference regular-season and conference tournament titles. During the season, he began to garner NBA scout attention. Hommes led the team to the 2019 NCAA Division II tournament title game for the first time in school history, where the Sea Lions fell to Northwest Missouri State. For the season, Hommes earned PacWest Player of the Year and Newcomer of the Year honors and nationally was named the NABC Division II National Player of the Year and an All-American.

Following his junior season, Hommes contemplated staying at Point Loma or transferring up to a Division I school. Ultimately, he decided to forego his final year of eligibility and declare himself eligible for the 2019 NBA draft.

== Professional career ==
=== Austin Spurs (2019–2020) ===
After going undrafted in the 2019 NBA draft, he was signed by the Milwaukee Bucks as a part of their 2019 NBA Summer League team.

On August 16, 2019, Hommes signed an Exhibit 10 contract with the San Antonio Spurs, ultimately securing him a spot in training camp and then with the Spurs’ NBA G League affiliate, the Austin Spurs. On February 22, 2020, Hommes had 23 points, seven rebounds, three assists and two steals in a win over the South Bay Lakers. He averaged 8 points and 3 rebounds per game in 36 games for Austin.

=== Vanoli Cremona (2020–2021) ===
On August 14, 2020, Hommes signed a one-year contract with Vanoli Cremona of the Italian Lega Basket Serie A (LBA).

=== Birmingham Squadron (2022) ===
On August 19, 2021, Hommes signed a two-way contract with the New Orleans Pelicans. However, he was waived on December 21, without playing a game for the Pelicans nor their NBA G League affiliate, the Birmingham Squadron.

On February 19, 2022, Hommes was traded from the Austin Spurs to the Birmingham Squadron in exchange for Jarrod Uthoff.

=== Saski Baskonia (2022–2023) ===
On July 10, 2022, Hommes signed with Saski Baskonia of the Spanish Liga ACB and the EuroLeague. On July 3, 2023, he parted ways with the club.

=== Aquila Basket Trento (2024) ===
On April 24, 2024, Hommes signed with Aquila Basket Trento of the Lega Basket Serie A (LBA).

=== Paris Basketball (2024–present) ===
On July 23, 2024, he signed with Paris Basketball of the LNB Pro A.

== Personal life ==
Hommes married Tivona Tinsley in August 2024.

== Career statistics ==
Legend
GP	Games played	GS	Games started	MPG	Minutes per game
FG%	Field-goal percentage	3P%	3-point field-goal percentage	FT%	Free-throw percentage
RPG	Rebounds per game	APG	Assists per game	SPG	Steals per game
BPG	Blocks per game	PPG	Points per game	PIR	Performance index rating
**Bold**	Career high

=== EuroLeague ===
Year	Team	GP	GS	MPG	FG%	3P%	FT%	RPG	APG	SPG	BPG	PPG	PIR
2022–23	Baskonia	31	22	19.9	.429	.361	.902	2.9	1.6	.4	.4	7.0	7.5
Career		31	22	19.9	.429	.361	.902	2.9	1.6	.4	.4	7.0	7.5
