= 2021–22 Pro A season =

Professional basketball season in France

2021–22 Pro A
- Season: 2021–22
- Dates: 1 October 2021 – 17 May 2022 (regular season)
- Teams: 18

Regular season
- Top seed: LDLC ASVEL
- Relegated: Orléans Loiret; Champagne Châlons Reims

Finals
- Champions: LDLC ASVEL (21st title)
- Runners-up: AS Monaco
- Semifinalists: Élan Béarnais Pau-Lacq-Orthez; JDA Dijon

The 2021–22 Pro A season, known as Betclic Élite due to sponsorship from online gambling company Betclic, was the 100th season of the Pro A, the top basketball league in France organised by the Ligue Nationale de Basket (LNB). The regular season began on 1 October 2021 and the play-offs finished on 25 June 2022. Via promotion and relegation with LNB Pro B, Fos Provence Basket (Fos-sur-mer) and Paris Basketball joined the league, replacing Élan Chalon and Boulazac Basket Dordogne.

LDLC ASVEL won its 20th league championship by defeating AS Monaco in the final.

== Format ==
Different from previous seasons, the playoffs were played in a single-elimination format.

== Teams ==
Location of teams in the 2019–20 Pro A season

=== Locations and arenas ===
Team	Home city	Stadium	Capacity
AS Monaco	Fontvieille, Monaco	Salle Gaston Médecin	3,700
ASVEL	Lyon–Villeurbanne	Astroballe	5,556
BCM Gravelines-Dunkerque	Gravelines	Sportica	3,500
Champagne Châlons Reims	Reims	Complexe René-Tys	3,000
Cholet	Cholet	La Meilleraie	5,191
Élan Béarnais Pau-Lacq-Orthez	Pau	Palais des Sports de Pau	7,707
Fos	Fos-sur-Mer	Complexe sportif Parsemain	2,000
ESSM Le Portel	Le Portel	Le Chaudron	3,500
JDA Dijon	Dijon	Palais des Sports de Dijon	5,000
JL Bourg	Bourg-en-Bresse	Ekinox	3,548
Le Mans Sarthe	Le Mans	Antarès	6,003
Limoges CSP	Limoges	Beaublanc	6,000
Metropolitans 92	Levallois	Palais des Sports Marcel Cerdan	4,000
Nanterre 92	Nanterre	Palais des Sports de Nanterre	3,000
Orléans Loiret	Orléans	Palais des Sports	3,222
Paris Basketball	Paris	Halle Georges Carpentier	5,000
Roanne	Roanne	Halle André Vacheresse	5,000
SIG Strasbourg	Strasbourg	Rhénus Sport	6,200

== Regular season ==
=== League table ===
Pos	Team	Pld	W	L	PF	PA	PD	Qualification or relegation
1	LDLC ASVEL	34	26	8	2919	2642	+277	Advance to playoffs
2	Monaco	34	25	9	2951	2732	+219	Advance to playoffs
3	Metropolitans 92	34	24	10	2956	2730	+226	Advance to playoffs
4	Limoges CSP	34	20	14	2700	2554	+146	Advance to playoffs
5	JDA Dijon	34	20	14	2769	2773	−4	Advance to playoffs
6	ÉB Pau-Lacq-Orthez	34	19	15	2794	2791	+3	Advance to playoffs
7	SIG Strasbourg	34	19	15	2889	2755	+134	Advance to playoffs
8	Cholet	34	18	16	2778	2790	−12	Advance to playoffs
9	Le Mans Sarthe	34	17	17	2810	2741	+69	
10	Nanterre 92	34	17	17	2877	2835	+42	
11	JL Bourg	34	15	19	2661	2606	+55	
12	BCM Gravelines	34	13	21	2792	2845	−53	
13	Roanne	34	13	21	2905	3021	−116	
14	ESSM Le Portel	34	13	21	2634	2797	−163	
15	Paris Basketball	34	13	21	2772	2963	−191	
16	Fos Provence Basket	34	12	22	2576	2744	−168	
17	Orléans Loiret (R)	34	12	22	2680	2915	−235	Relegation to Pro B
18	Champagne Châlons Reims (R)	34	10	24	2793	3022	−229	Relegation to Pro B

Source: LNB.fr
Rules for classification: 1) points; 2) Head-to-head; 3) Points difference; 4) Points scored.
(R) Relegated

== Playoffs ==
The quarter-finals were played in a best-of-three format, while the semi-finals and finals were played in a best-of-five format.

Quarterfinals
1	LDLC ASVEL	2
8	Cholet	1
4	Limoges CSP	0
5	JDA Dijon	2
2	Monaco	2
7	SIG Strasbourg	1
3	Metropolitans 92	0
6	ÉB Pau-Lacq-Orthez	2

Semifinals
1	LDLC ASVEL	3
5	JDA Dijon	0
2	Monaco	3
6	ÉB Pau-Lacq-Orthez	1

Finals
1	LDLC ASVEL	3
2	Monaco	2

== Awards ==
- Season MVP: Will Cummings (Metropolitans 92)
- Finals MVP: Élie Okobo (LDLC ASVEL)
- Best Young Player: Victor Wembanyama (LDLC ASVEL)
- Best Defender: Ismael Kamagate (Paris Basketball)
- Best Scorer: Brandon Jefferson (Élan Béarnais)
- Best Blocker: Chris Horton (Nanterre 92)
- Best Coach: Vincent Collet (Metropolitans 92)
- LNB Pro A 1st Team:

Role	Player	Team
PG	Will Cummings	Metropolitans 92
G/F	Nicolas Lang	Limoges CSP
SF	Alpha Diallo	AS Monaco
F/C	TaShawn Thomas	Le Mans
F/C	Chris Horton	Nanterre 92
