= Pierric Poupet =

French basketball coach and former player

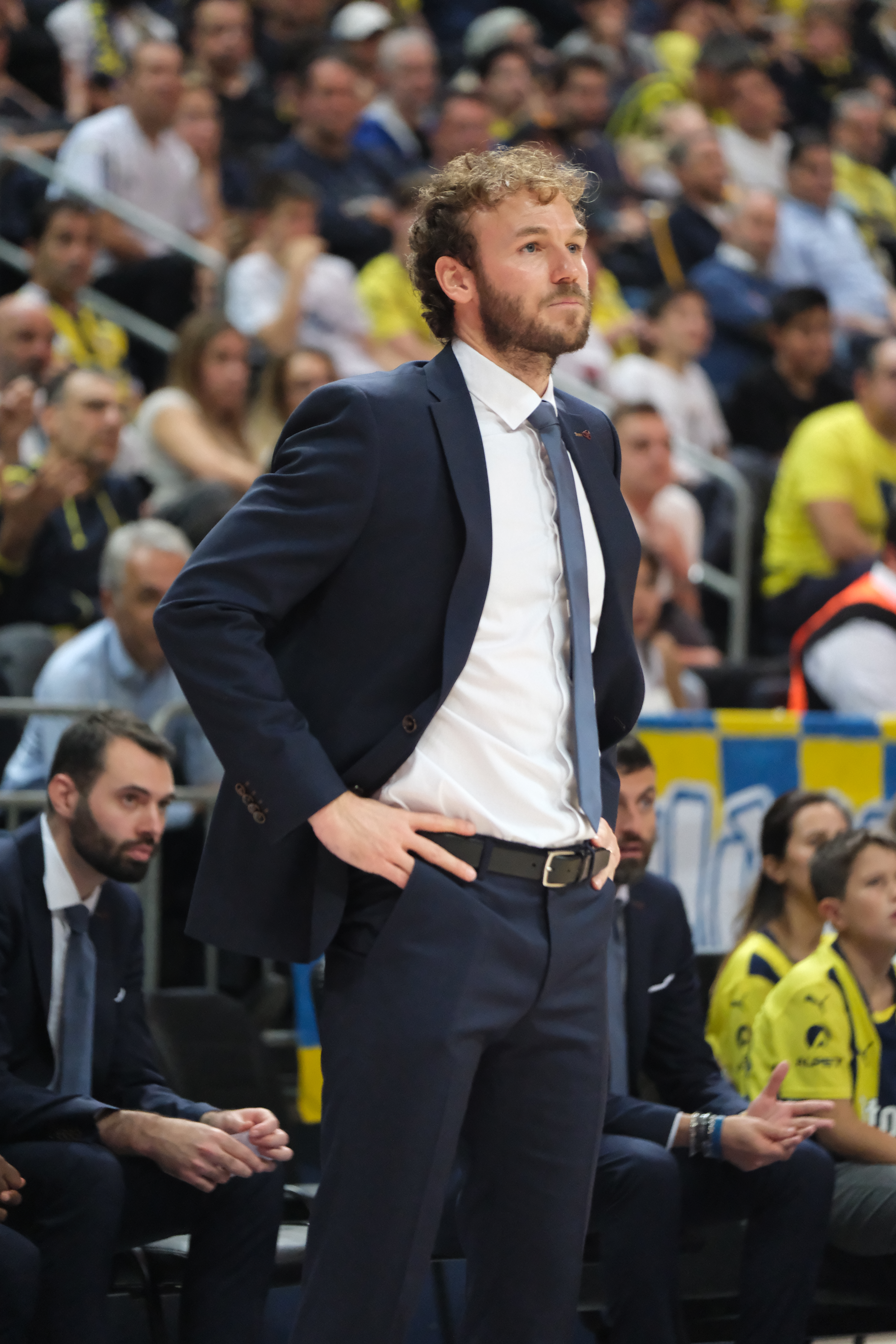
- Poupet with ASVEL in 2025

Paris Basketball
- Title: Assistant coach
- League: LNB Élite; EuroLeague

Personal information
- Born: August 18, 1984 (age 42) Mont-Saint-Aignan, France
- Listed height: 6 ft 4 in (1.93 m)
- Listed weight: 176 lb (80 kg)

Career information
- NBA draft: 2006: undrafted
- Playing career: 2002–2020
- Position: Point guard
- Coaching career: 2023–present

Career history

Playing
- 2002–2003: Golbay Epinal
- 2003–2004: CSP Limoges
- 2004–2006: JL Bourg-en-Bresse
- 2006–2007: Entente Orleans
- 2007–2009: Chorale Roanne Basket
- 2009–2012: SPO Rouen Basket
- 2012–2013: Chalons-Reims
- 2013–2014: Denain ASC Voltaire
- 2014–2016: BC Orchies
- 2016–2020: Denain ASC Voltaire

Coaching
- 2023–2024: ASVEL (assistant)
- 2024–2026: ASVEL
- 2026–present: Paris Basketball (assistant)

Pierric Poupet is a French professional basketball coach and former player who currently serves as the assistant coach for Paris Basketball of the French LNB Elite and the EuroLeague.

== Playing career ==
Poupet had a long professional basketball career in France, lasting 18 years from 2002 until his 2020 retirement. He was undrafted in the 2006 NBA Draft.

== Coaching career ==
Poupet began his coaching career as an assistant coach with LDLC ASVEL before being elevated to head coach in January 2024.

On April 17, 2024, Poupet received a two year extension with LDLC ASVEL after leading the team to a 6-9 record in the EuroLeague.

On June 15, 2026, Poupet was dismissed as head coach of LDLC ASVEL after finishing with a 27-60 record over two and a half seasons.

On July 22, 2026, Poupet was named as an associate head coach at Paris Basketball under head coach Maxime Lefèvre.

== Coaching record ==
Legend
G	Games coached	W	Games won	L	Games lost	W–L %	Win-loss %

Note: The EuroLeague is not the only competition in which the team played during the season. He also coached in domestic competition, and regional competition if applicable.

=== EuroLeague ===
Team	Year	G	W	L	W–L%	Result
LDLC ASVEL	2023–24	15	6	9	.400	Eliminated in the regular season
LDLC ASVEL	2024–25	34	13	21	.382	Eliminated in the regular season
LDLC ASVEL	2025–26	38	8	30	.211	Eliminated in the regular season
Career		87	27	60	.310	
