= Léopold Cavalière =

French basketball player (born 1996)

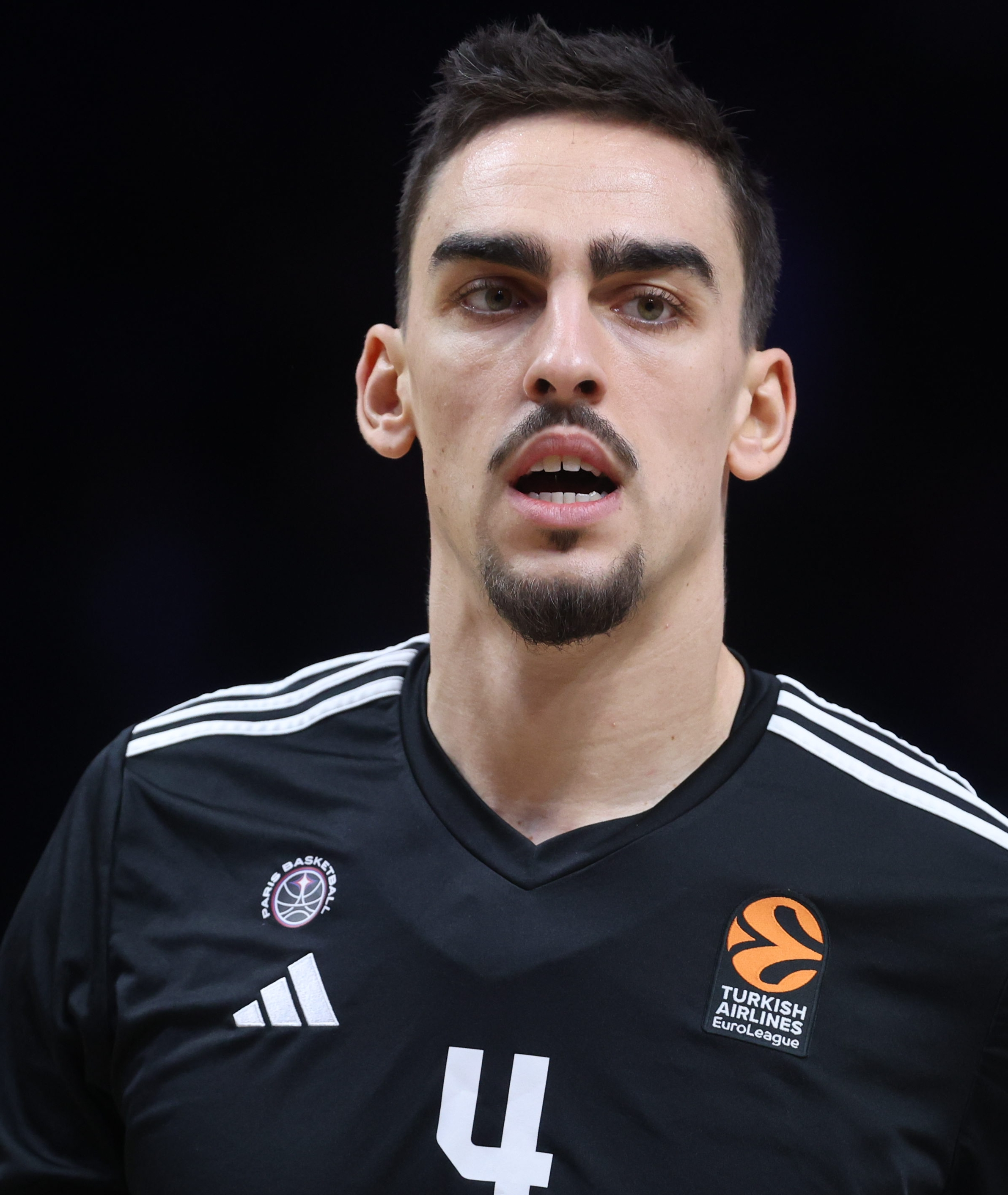
- Cavalière in 2024 with Paris

No. 4 – Paris Basketball
- Position: Power forward
- League: LNB Élite; EuroLeague

Personal information
- Born: 27 April 1996 (age 30) Albi, France
- Listed height: 2.03 m (6 ft 8 in)
- Listed weight: 95 kg (209 lb)

Career history
- 2013–2020: Élan Béarnais
- 2020–2024: SIG Strasbourg
- 2024–present: Paris Basketball

Career highlights
- French U21 Champion (2014); French U21 Championship best player (2014); LNB Pro A Champion (2017); French National 3x3 Champion (2020)

Léopold Cavalière (born 27 April 1996) is a French professional basketball player for Paris Basketball of the LNB Élite and the EuroLeague. Standing at 2.03 m (6 ft 8 in), he primarily plays at the power forward position.

== Professional career ==
In 2013/14, he was crowned French U21 champion with Élan Chalon where he averaged 16.9 points per gane, 7.6 rebounds and 21.2 efficiency over the season. He was named best player in the U21 championship, while making fifteen appearances for the professional team from Pau, when he was not yet 18 years old.

For the 2018/19 LNB Pro A season, he averaged 7.9 points, 5.6 rebounds and 10.8 efficiency. In the 2019/20 final season with Élan Chalon, he averaged 3.9 points, 4.2 rebounds and 7,5 efficiency as team captain.

In May 2020, at 24 years old, Cavalière joined SIG Strasbourg alongside Yannis Morin. He left Pau-Orthez after playing there for nine years.

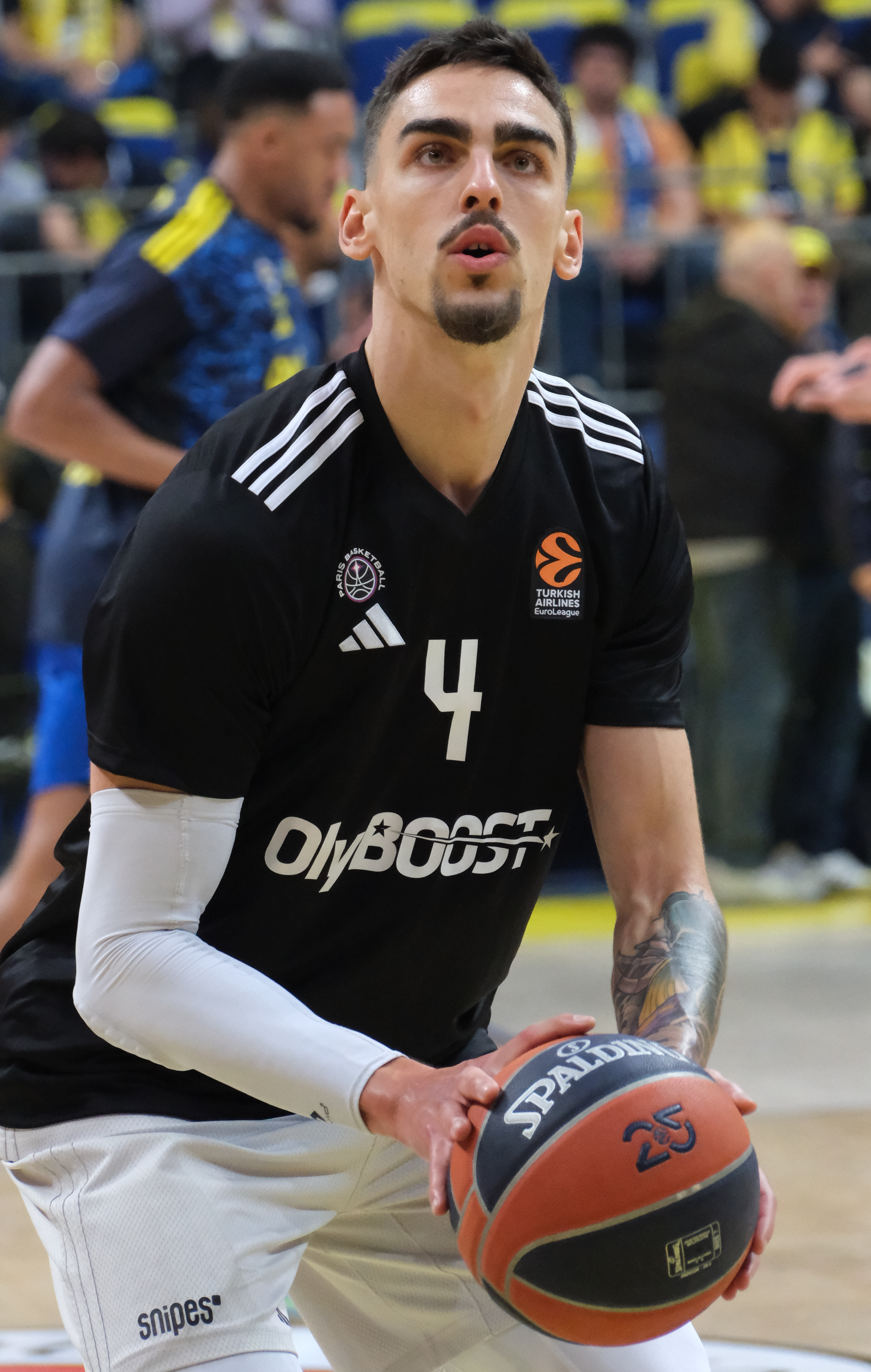
Cavalière in 2025

On June 24, 2024, he signed with Paris Basketball of the LNB Pro A.

== 3x3 career ==
As part of Team Paris, Cavalière won the 2020 French Championship alongside teammates Angelo Tsagarakis, Johan Passave-Ducteil and Antoine Eito.
