= Juhann Begarin =

French basketball player (born 2002)

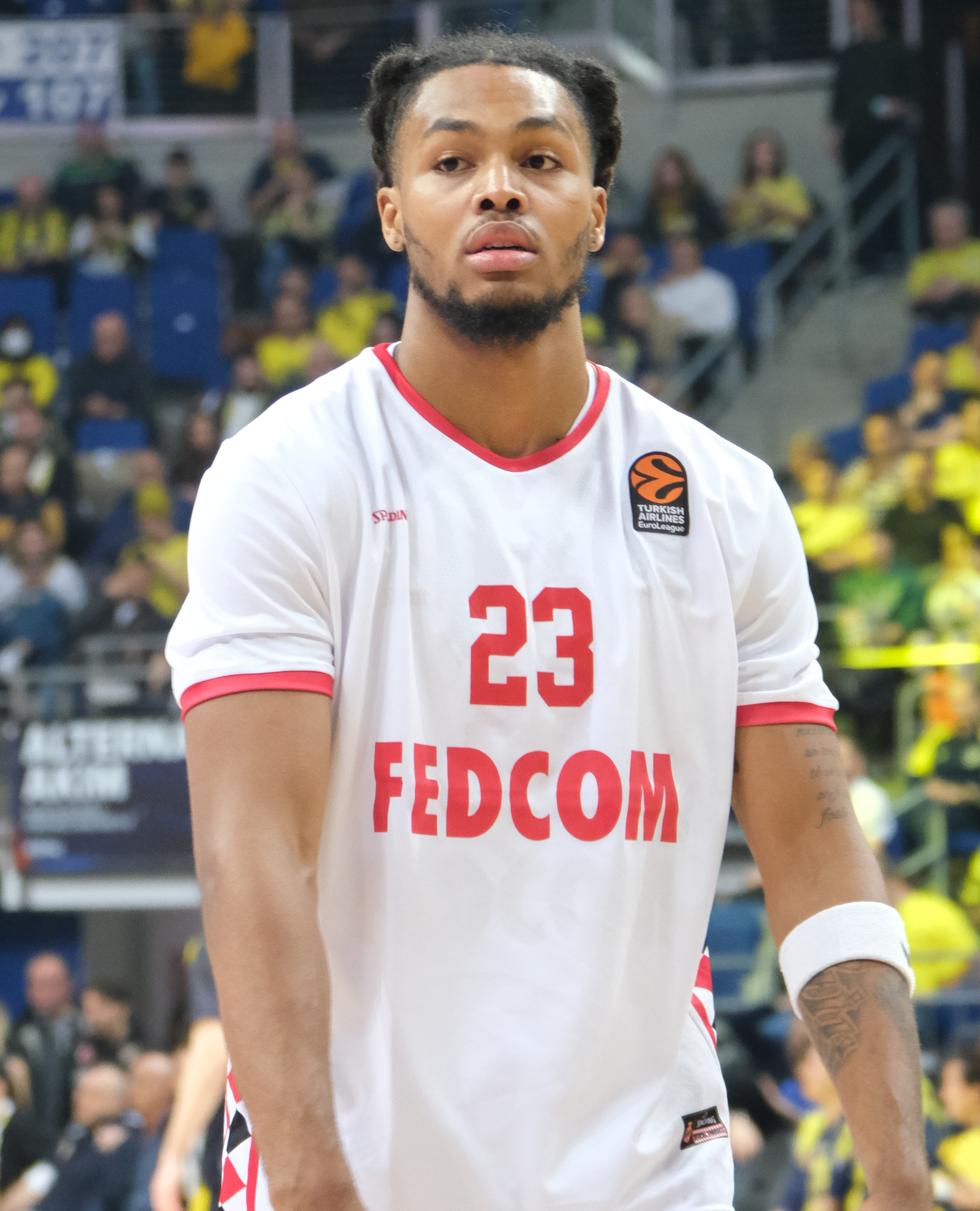
- Begarin with AS Monaco in 2024

Free agent
- Position: Small forward / shooting guard

Personal information
- Born: 7 August 2002 (age 24) Les Abymes, Guadeloupe
- Listed height: 1.97 m (6 ft 6 in)
- Listed weight: 84 kg (185 lb)

Career information
- NBA draft: 2021: 2nd round, 45th overall pick
- Drafted by: Boston Celtics
- Playing career: 2019–present

Career history
- 2019–2023: Paris Basketball
- 2023–2024: Nanterre 92
- 2024–2026: AS Monaco
- 2026: ASVEL

Career highlights
- French League champion (2026); French Cup winner (2026); French League Cup winner (2026); French Supercup winner (2025)
- Stats at Basketball Reference

Juhann Mathieu Begarin (born 7 August 2002) is a French professional basketball player who last played for ASVEL of the LNB Élite and the EuroLeague. Standing at 1.96 m (6 ft 5 in), he plays the small forward and shooting guard positions.

== Early life and career ==
Begarin was born and raised in the French overseas region of Guadeloupe in the Southern Caribbean. He initially tried to register to play football, but when he could not find the coach, he decided to play basketball. He played for Baie-Mahault BC and then ASC Ban-E-Lot, winning multiple regional titles in his age group.

Begarin moved to Corbeil-Essonnes, a suburb of Paris, with his family when he was 16 years old to pursue a basketball career. He joined INSEP, a prestigious sports institute in Paris, and played for affiliated club Centre Fédéral in the Nationale Masculine 1 (NM1), the third-tier league of France. In the 2018–19 season, Begarin averaged 11.6 points, 3.4 rebounds and two steals per game in the NM1. In February 2019, he averaged 19.8 points, 6.5 rebounds and 4.3 steals per game at the Adidas Next Generation Tournament Kaunas. In June 2019, Begarin was named most valuable player of the Basketball Without Borders Europe camp in Riga, Latvia. Later in the month, he parted ways with Centre Fédéral.

== Professional career ==
=== Paris Basketball (2019–2023) ===
On 8 July 2019, Begarin signed with Paris Basketball of the LNB Pro B. He made his debut on 11 October 2019, scoring seven points in a 70–68 win over Fos Provence. In the 2019–20 season, Begarin averaged 4.8 points, 2.1 rebounds and 1.2 assists per game. In the following season, he averaged 11.7 points, 3.5 rebounds and 2.9 assists per game, helping his team earn promotion to the LNB Pro A. On 20 August 2021, it was announced he would return to Paris. In 29 games for the 2021–2022 season playing for Paris Basketball of the LNB Pro A Begarin maintained per game averages of 11.1 points, 4.2 rebounds, 1.5 assists, 1.5 steals, and 0.3 blocks over a 28-minute average. Begarin shot 43.2% on FG's which breaks down to 51.2% on 2pt shots, and 30.9% on 3pt shots, along with 56.3% from the free throw line.

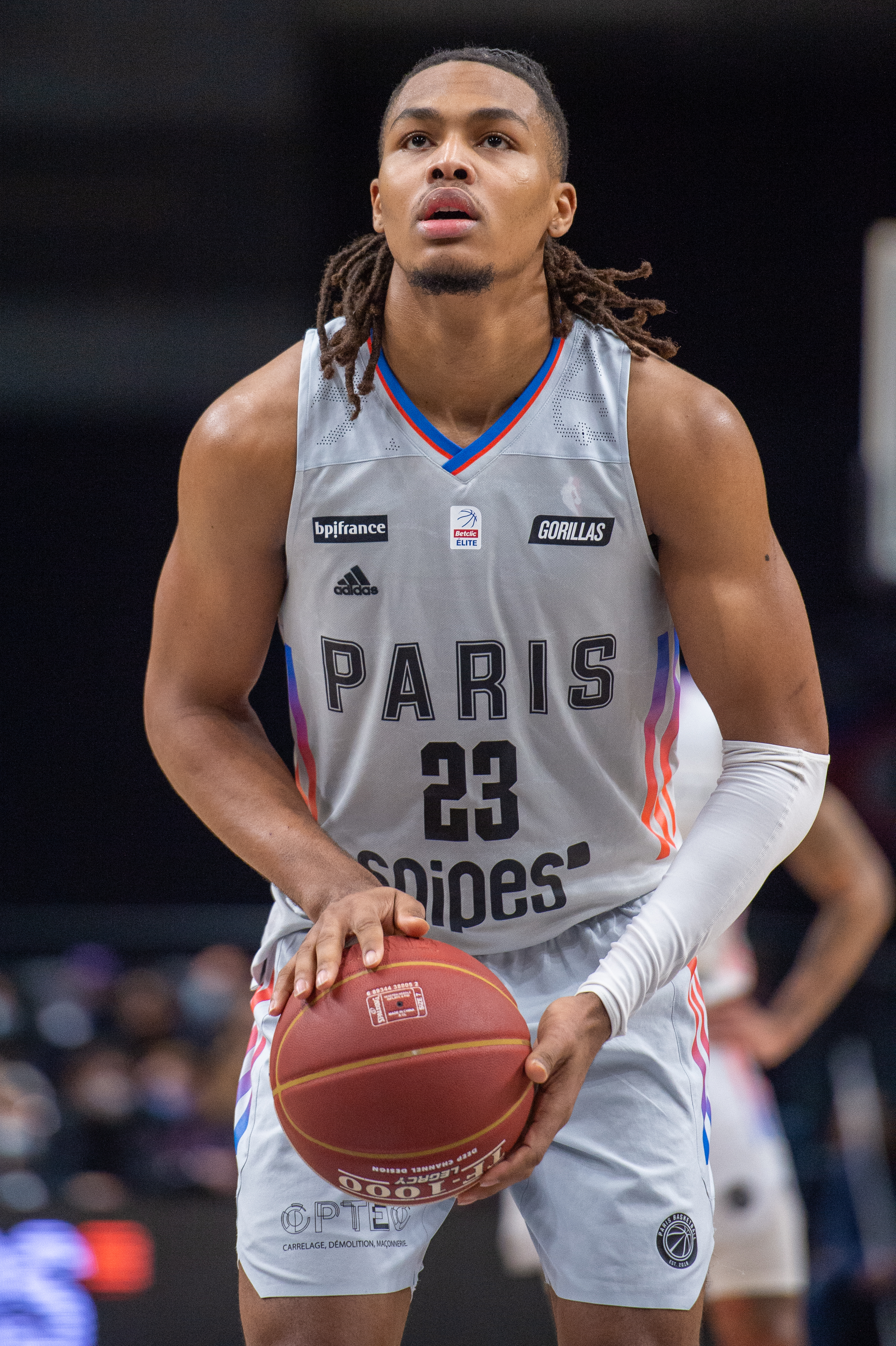
Begarin with Paris Basketball in 2021

=== Nanterre 92 (2023–2024) ===
On 8 June 2023, Begarin signed a two-year deal with Nanterre 92.

=== AS Monaco (2024–2026) ===
On 12 July 2024, Begarin signed with AS Monaco of the LNB Élite.

=== ASVEL (2026) ===
On 7 October 2026, Begarin signed a one-month deal with ASVEL of the LNB Élite and the EuroLeague.

=== NBA draft rights ===
In July 2021, Begarin was drafted by the Boston Celtics with the 45th overall pick in the 2021 NBA draft. He played for the Celtics in the 2021 NBA Summer League.

== National team career ==
Begarin played for France at the 2018 FIBA U16 European Championship in Novi Sad, Serbia. He averaged 15.6 points, three rebounds and 2.3 steals per game, leading his team to fourth place. Bégarin represented France at the 2019 FIBA U18 European Championship in Volos, Greece, where he averaged 7.9 points, three rebounds and 1.9 steals per game. He played alongside Malcolm Cazalon and helped his team to a fifth-place finish.

== Personal life ==
Begarin's older brother, Jessie, has played basketball professionally in France, including in the LNB Pro A, the first-tier league. Both of his parents played and coached basketball in Guadeloupe.
