= Paris Basketball =

French professional basketball club

- Nickname: Club de la capitale (Club of the capital)
- Leagues: LNB Élite; EuroLeague
- Founded: 12 July 2018; 8 years ago
- History: Paris Basketball; 2018–present
- Arena: Adidas Arena
- Capacity: 8,000
- Location: Paris, France
- Main sponsor: OlyBet
- President: David Kahn
- Head coach: Maxime Lefèvre
- Team captain: Sebastián Herrera
- Ownership: Paris Basketball Investments
- Championships: 1 EuroCup; 1 French Championship; 1 French Cup; 1 French League Cup; 1 French Supercup
- Website: parisbasketball.com
Home	Away	Third

Paris Basketball is a French professional basketball club based in Paris. The club currently plays in the LNB Élite, the first division of basketball in France, since 2021 and in the EuroLeague, the first division of basketball in Europe, since 2024.

Founded in 2018, Paris plays its home games at the Adidas Arena. Three years after its establishment, Paris was promoted to the first-level LNB Élite, then known as LNB Pro A, for the first time, in 2021. In 2024, the team won the Leaders Cup and the 2023–24 EuroCup titles, and one year later they won the club's first French championship title and the French Cup.

== History ==
=== Early history (2018–2022) ===
The club started as a project to bring a big basketball club to the city of Paris, led by David Kahn, former director of the Minnesota Timberwolves of the National Basketball Association (NBA). In July 2018, the creation of the professional club was announced. At the revealing, the ambitions were to be a team in the EuroLeague, the highest-level European league, by 2022. The future home arena of the team would be an arena in Quartier de La Chapelle, that was constructed for the 2024 Olympics. The team immediately entered the LNB Pro B, the national second-tier league, as the club bought the licence of HTV Basket. The club would play its home games in the Halle Georges Carpentier, waiting for the construction of the Paris Arena II.

The team began in the Pro B under head coach Jean-Cristophe "JC" Prat, who developed an effective style of play, which showcased young players such as Ismaël Kamagate, Juhann Begarin and Dustin Sleva.

In the 2020–21 season, Paris finished in the second place in the LNB Pro B championship and thus were promoted to LNB Pro A for the first time in club history. During that season, rapper Sheck Wes also played for the team for three games while coming off the bench for Paris.

=== European success (2022–present) ===
In July 2022, Paris signed Will Weaver as the team's new head coach. Paris Basketball was selected to play in the 2022–23 season of the EuroCup, its debut in European competition.

In June 2023, Paris signed Finnish head coach Tuomas Iisalo, who had led Bonn to a maiden Basketball Champions League title in the previous year. The team also acquired a number of Bonn's key players, including T. J. Shorts, Tyson Ward and Collin Malcolm. On 18 February 2024, Paris won their first trophy in team history, as they won the 2024 Leaders Cup title, by defeating Nanterre 90–85 in the final, with a 26-point performance of the MVP T. J. Shorts.

In the Pro A, Paris set a French basketball record with 25 consecutive wins, and finished second after losing to Monaco in the league finals. The team had more success on the international stage – Paris won the 2023–24 EuroCup, following a 2–0 finals win over fellow French team JL Bourg. Following their championship, Paris Basketball earned their promotion to the 2024–25 season of the EuroLeague. The club also announced that it will also launch its women's team.

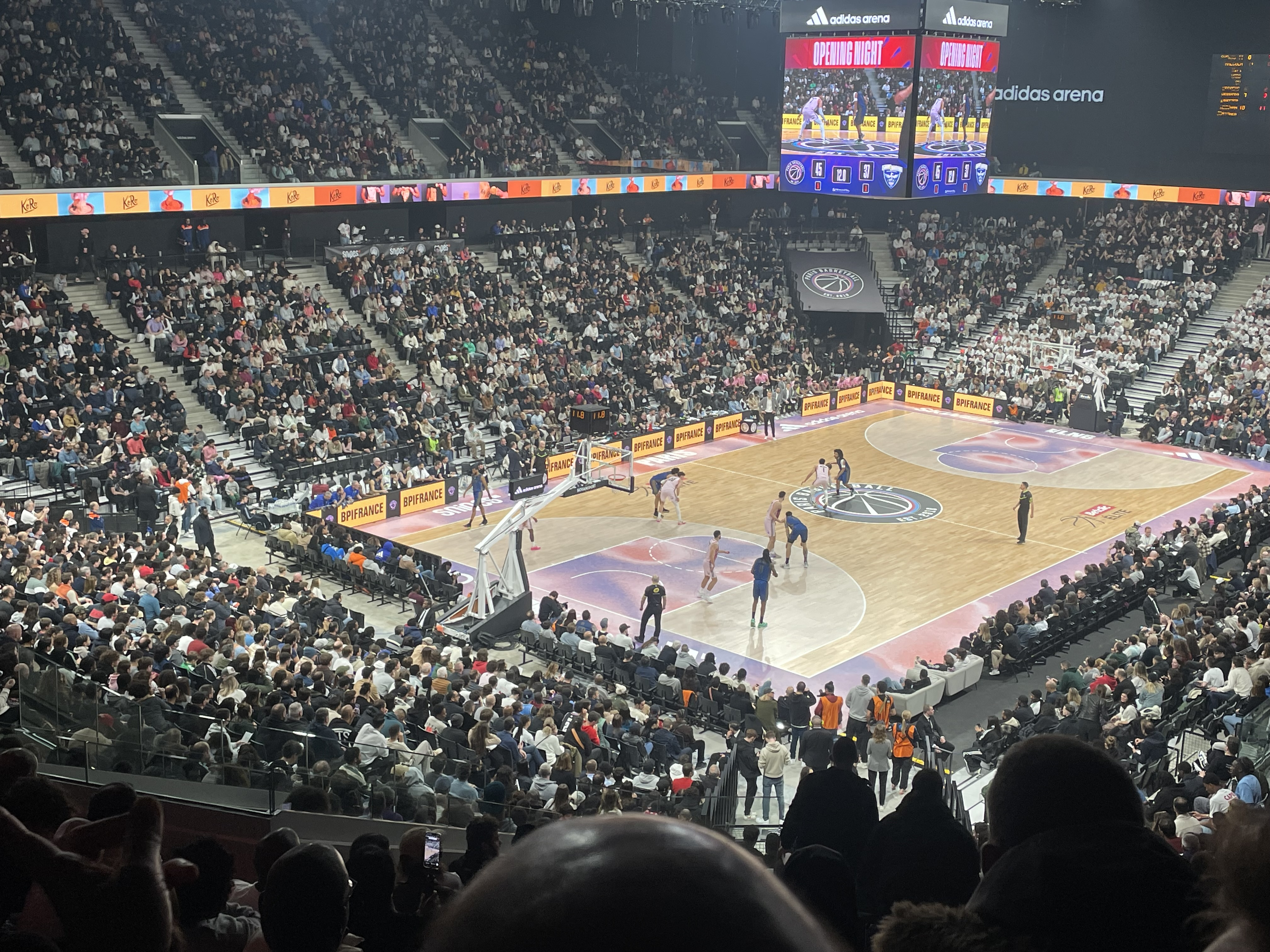
A LNB Pro A home game in the Adidas Arena in February 2024

After their EuroCup-winning season, coach Iisalo left the team to be an assistant coach (and later interim turned official head coach) for the Memphis Grizzlies of the National Basketball Association (NBA). In June 2024, Tiago Splitter was signed as his replacement, which was Splitter's first head coaching job.

In the 2024–25 season, Paris made its debut in the EuroLeague, the highest level of European basketball. The team managed to qualify for the playoffs through the play-ins, and was eventually defeated by Fenerbahçe in the quarterfinals.

== Honours and other achievements ==
Honours
Type	Competition	Titles	Seasons
International	EuroCup	1	2023–24
Domestic	French League	1	2024–25
Domestic	French Cup	1	2024–25
Domestic	French League Cup	1	2024
Domestic	French Supercup	1	2026

=== Other achievements ===
==== Domestic competitions ====
- French League
  - Runners-up (2): 2023–24, 2025–26
- LNB Pro B
  - Runners-up (1): 2020–21

== Season by season ==
Season	Tier	League	Pos.	W–L	French Cup	Leaders Cup	European competitions	
2018–19	2	Pro B	11th	16–18	Round of 64	Quarterfinalist		
2019–20	2	Pro B	10th^{1}	11–12	Round of 32	Quarterfinalist		
2020–21	2	Pro B	2nd	23–11	Round of 64	Semifinalist		
2021–22	1	Pro A	15th	13–21	Quarterfinalist			
2022–23	1	Pro A	9th	16–18	Round of 32		2 EuroCup	QF
2023–24	1	Élite	2nd	27–7	Round of 64	Champion	2 EuroCup	C
2024–25	1	Élite	1st	31–10	Champion	Quarterfinalist	1 EuroLeague	PO
2025–26	1	Élite	2nd	29–13	Round of 16	Quarterfinalist	1 EuroLeague	RS

^1 Cancelled due to the COVID-19 pandemic in Europe.

== International record ==
Season	Achievement	Notes
EuroLeague
2024–25	Quarterfinals	Eliminated 3–0 by Fenerbahçe, 83–78 (L) & 89–72 (L) in Istanbul, 88–98 (L) in Paris.
EuroCup
2022–23	Quarterfinals	Eliminated by CB Gran Canaria, 104–74 (L) in Las Palmas.
2023–24	Champions	Defeated 2–0 JL Bourg Basket, 77–64 (W) in Paris, 81–89 (W) in Bourg-en-Bresse, in the final of the EuroCup.

== The road to the EuroCup triumph ==
2023–24 EuroCup Basketball

Round	Team	Home	Away
RS	(Lithuania) BC Wolves	105-78	79-110
RS	(Italy) Reyer Venezia	100-70	75-81
RS	(Germany) Hamburg Towers	120-91	69-105
RS	(United Kingdom) London Lions	94-77	102-106
RS	(Ukraine) BC Prometey	93-72	79-96
RS	(Israel) Hapoel Tel Aviv B.C.	114-87	86-104
RS	(Spain) Joventut Badalona	89-82	94-101
RS	(Turkey) Beşiktaş	63-68	72-95
RS	(Slovenia) KK Cedevita Olimpija	119-66	77-93
QF	(Spain) Joventut Badalona	86-70	
SF	(United Kingdom) London Lions	99-86	85-93
F	(France) JL Bourg Basket	77-64	81-89

== Home arenas ==
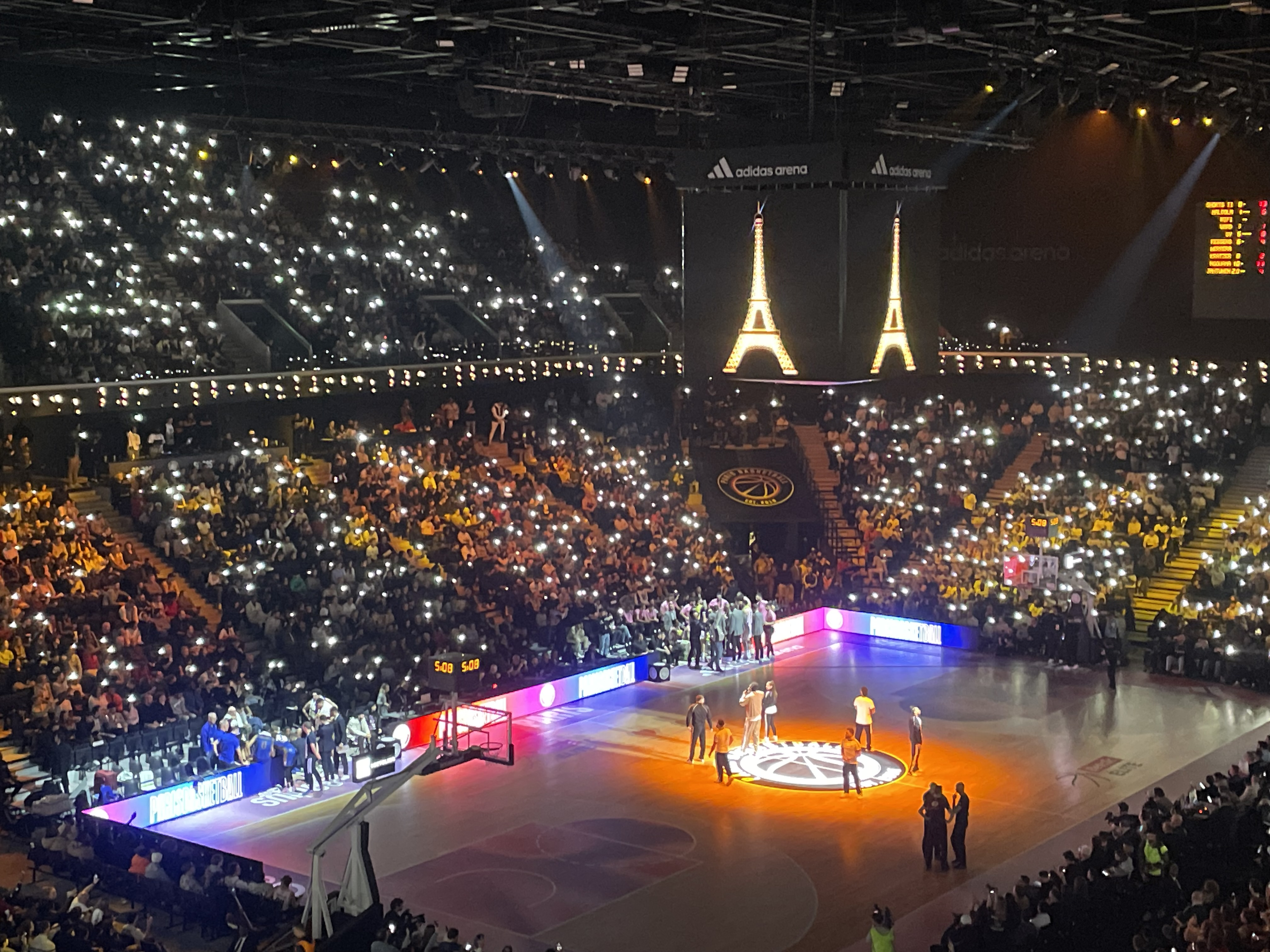
A Paris Basketball home game inside the Adidas Arena.

The team's home arena is called Adidas Arena, which seats 8,000 spectators.

=== Secondary home arena ===
The team's secondary home arena is called Accor Arena, which seats 15,705 spectators.

=== Former arena ===
The team's home arena from 2018 to 2024 is called Halle Georges Carpentier, which seats 5,009 spectators.

== Players ==
=== Current roster ===
Note: Flags indicate national team eligibility at FIBA-sanctioned events. Players may hold other non-FIBA nationalities not displayed.

Paris Basketball roster
Players
Coaches

Pos.	No.	Nat.	Name	Ht.		Age
F	1	(United States)	Warren, T. J.	2.03 m (6 ft 8 in)	100 kg (220 lb)	33 – 5 September 1993
G	2	(France)	Hifi, Nadir	1.84 m (6 ft 0 in)	82 kg (181 lb)	24 – 16 July 2002
G/F	3	(France)	Tarpey, Terry	1.96 m (6 ft 5 in)	95 kg (209 lb)	32 – 2 March 1994
F/C	4	(France)	Cavalière, Léopold	2.03 m (6 ft 8 in)	95 kg (209 lb)	30 – 27 April 1996
PG	5	(France)	Ntilikina, Frank	1.93 m (6 ft 4 in)	91 kg (201 lb)	28 – 28 July 1998
G/F	7	(Chile)	Herrera, Sebastián (C)	1.93 m (6 ft 4 in)	86 kg (190 lb)	29 – 1 November 1997
G/F	8	(United States)	Rhoden, Jared	1.96 m (6 ft 5 in)	95 kg (209 lb)	27 – 27 August 1999
PG	9	(United States)	Etienne, Tyson	1.85 m (6 ft 1 in)	91 kg (201 lb)	27 – 17 September 1999
SG	11	(France)	Ayayi, Joël	1.96 m (6 ft 5 in)	82 kg (181 lb)	26 – 5 March 2000
C	13	(France)	Dokossi, Allan	2.03 m (6 ft 8 in)	97 kg (214 lb)	27 – 14 October 1999
C	15	(Senegal)	Faye, Momo	2.05 m (6 ft 9 in)	100 kg (220 lb)	21 – 5 February 2005
F	16	(France)	Boungou Colo, Nobel	2.02 m (6 ft 8 in)	90 kg (198 lb)	38 – 26 April 1988
G/F	20	(United States)	Morgan, Jeremy	1.98 m (6 ft 6 in)	87 kg (192 lb)	31 – 8 May 1995
F/C	24	(United States)	Johnson, Alize	2.03 m (6 ft 8 in)	96 kg (212 lb)	30 – 22 April 1996
PF	34	(United States)	Hommes, Daulton	2.03 m (6 ft 8 in)	98 kg (216 lb)	30 – 4 July 1996
F	45	(Brazil)	Pereira, Mãozinha	2.03 m (6 ft 8 in)	80 kg (176 lb)	26 – 28 August 2000

Head coach

- (France) Maxime Lefèvre

Assistant coach(es)

- (France) Pierric Poupet
- (France) Bienvenu Kindoki

Legend

- (C) Team captain
- Injured

- Roster
Updated: October 6, 2026

=== Depth chart ===
Pos.	Starting 5	Bench 1	Bench 2	Bench 3
C	Momo Faye ^	Allan Dokossi †	Léopold Cavalière †	Mãozinha Pereira *
PF	T. J. Warren *	Alize Johnson *		Daulton Hommes *
SF	Sebastián Herrera °	Jeremy Morgan *		Nobel Boungou Colo †
SG	Nadir Hifi †	Jared Rhoden *	Joël Ayayi †	Terry Tarpey †
PG	Frank Ntilikina †	Tyson Etienne *

Notes: The LNB Élite strictly enforces a "JFL" (Joueur Formé Localement) system to protect domestic talent, alongside limits on international transfers. Blue † – JFL player; (Note: A JFL player is a player that played for at least three years between the ages of 12 and 21 on a French team. To qualify as a JFL, a player does not necessarily need French citizenship but must have spent at least three seasons training in a French club’s youth academy system between the ages of 12 and 21. Minimum of 4 JFL players must be included on the active roster. In EuroLeague, the team did not have any limitations regarding the number of JFL players.) Red * – foreign player; (Note: A foreign player is a player from outside France. Maximum of 4 "Foreigners" (Non-EU / Non-Cotonou) are allowed. Players from the United States or Canada typically fall under this category.) Purple °; – Cotonou player (Note: "Cotonou+" players: Players holding passports from European Union nations or countries party to the Cotonou Agreement do not count against the 4-"Foreigner" cap, but they do count toward the overall 6 non-JFL maximum. In EuroLeague, the team did not have any limitations regarding the number of Cotonou players.) Gold ^; – non-JFL player (Note: "Non-JFL" players: players who do not qualify as "Locally Trained" (Joueur Formé Localement) under French basketball regulations. A maximum of 6 non-JFL players are allowed on a game sheet.) Green ‡ – youth player (Note: "Youth" players: players who are under the age of 20. In LNB Élite, there is no strict mandatory minimum requirement forcing teams to put youth players on their active 12-man game sheet. However, the league uses a highly integrated structure that connects senior squads directly to youth development through the "Espoirs" (U21) system.)

=== Notable players ===
Note: Flags indicate national team eligibility at FIBA-sanctioned events. Players may hold other non-FIBA nationalities not displayed.

Criteria

To appear in this section a player must have either:

- Set a club record or won an individual award while at the club
- Played at least one official international match for their national team at any time
- Played at least one official NBA match at any time.

- (Australia) Chris Goulding
- (Canada) Kris Joseph
- (Chile) (Germany) Sebastián Herrera
- (Finland) Mikael Jantunen
- (France) (Benin) Joël Ayayi
- (France) Milan Barbitch
- (France) Juhann Begarin
- (France) Nobel Boungou Colo
- (France) Léopold Cavalière
- (France) Pacôme Dadiet
- (France) Gauthier Denis
- (France) Mohamed Diawara
- (France) Gary Florimont
- (France) Sylvain Francisco
- (France) (Algeria) Nadir Hifi
- (France) Ismaël Kamagate
- (France) Amath M'Baye
- (France) Yakuba Ouattara
- (France) Amara Sy
- (France) Bandja Sy
- (France) Axel Toupane
- (Germany) Leon Kratzer
- (Germany) Maodo Lô
- (Nigeria) Ben Uzoh
- (United States) Kyle Allman Jr.
- (United States) (Armenia) Ryan Boatright
- (United States) Jeremy Evans
- (United States) Kevarrius Hayes
- (United States) Daulton Hommes
- (United States) Collin Malcolm
- (United States) Kyle O'Quinn
- (United States) Jared Rhoden
- (United States) Justin Robinson
- (United States) (North Macedonia) T. J. Shorts
- (United States) Aamir Simms
- (United States) Justin Simon
- (United States) Dustin Sleva
- (United States) Lamar Stevens
- (United States) Tyrone Wallace
- (United States) Tyson Ward

=== Players at the NBA draft ===
*	Denotes player who has been selected for at least one All-Star Game and All-NBA Team
^{#}	Denotes player who has never appeared in an NBA regular-season or playoff game
^{~}	Denotes player who has been selected as Rookie of the Year

Position	Player	Year	Round	Pick	Drafted by
SG	(France) Juhann Begarin	2021	2nd round	45th	Boston Celtics
C	(France) Ismaël Kamagate	2022	2nd round	46th	Detroit Pistons

== Head coaches ==
No.	Name	From	To	Ref.
1	(France) Jean-Christophe Prat	2018	2022	
2	(United States) Will Weaver	2022	2023	
3	(Finland) Tuomas Iisalo	2023	2024	
4	(Brazil) Tiago Splitter	2024	2025	
5	(Italy) Francesco Tabellini	2025	2026	
6	(Germany) Julius Thomas	2026	2026	
7	(France) Maxime Lefèvre	2026		

== Individual awards ==
All-EuroLeague First Team

- T. J. Shorts – 2024–25

EuroLeague Rising Star

- Nadir Hifi – 2025

EuroLeague Play-In MVP

- T. J. Shorts – 2025

EuroLeague MVP of the Month

- T. J. Shorts – November 2024

EuroLeague MVP of the Round

- T. J. Shorts – 2024–25, Regular Season, Round 5.
- T. J. Shorts – 2024–25, Regular Season, Round 10.
- T. J. Shorts – 2024–25, Regular Season, Round 30.
- T. J. Shorts – 2024–25, Regular Season, Round 32.

EuroCup Basketball MVP

- T. J. Shorts – 2024

EuroCup Basketball Finals MVP

- T. J. Shorts – 2024

EuroCup Basketball Coach of the Year

- Tuomas Iisalo – 2024

All-EuroCup First Team

- T. J. Shorts – 2023–24

All-EuroCup Second Team

- Nadir Hifi – 2023–24

EuroCup Basketball MVP of the Week

- Ismaël Kamagate – 2022–23, Regular Season, Round 6.
- T. J. Shorts – 2023–24, Regular Season, Round 1.
- T. J. Shorts – 2023–24, Regular Season, Round 10.
- T. J. Shorts – 2023–24, Regular Season, Round 12.
- T. J. Shorts – 2023–24, Playoffs, Quarterfinals.
- T. J. Shorts – 2023–24, Playoffs, Semifinals.

== Sponsorships ==
Official Shirt Sponsor	OlyBet
Official Sport Clothing Manufacturer	Adidas

== Esports ==
The official Paris Basketball NBA 2K esports team was founded in July 2024. The team currently competes in the Cyber EuroLeague.
