= Yakuba Ouattara =

Ghanaian-French basketball player

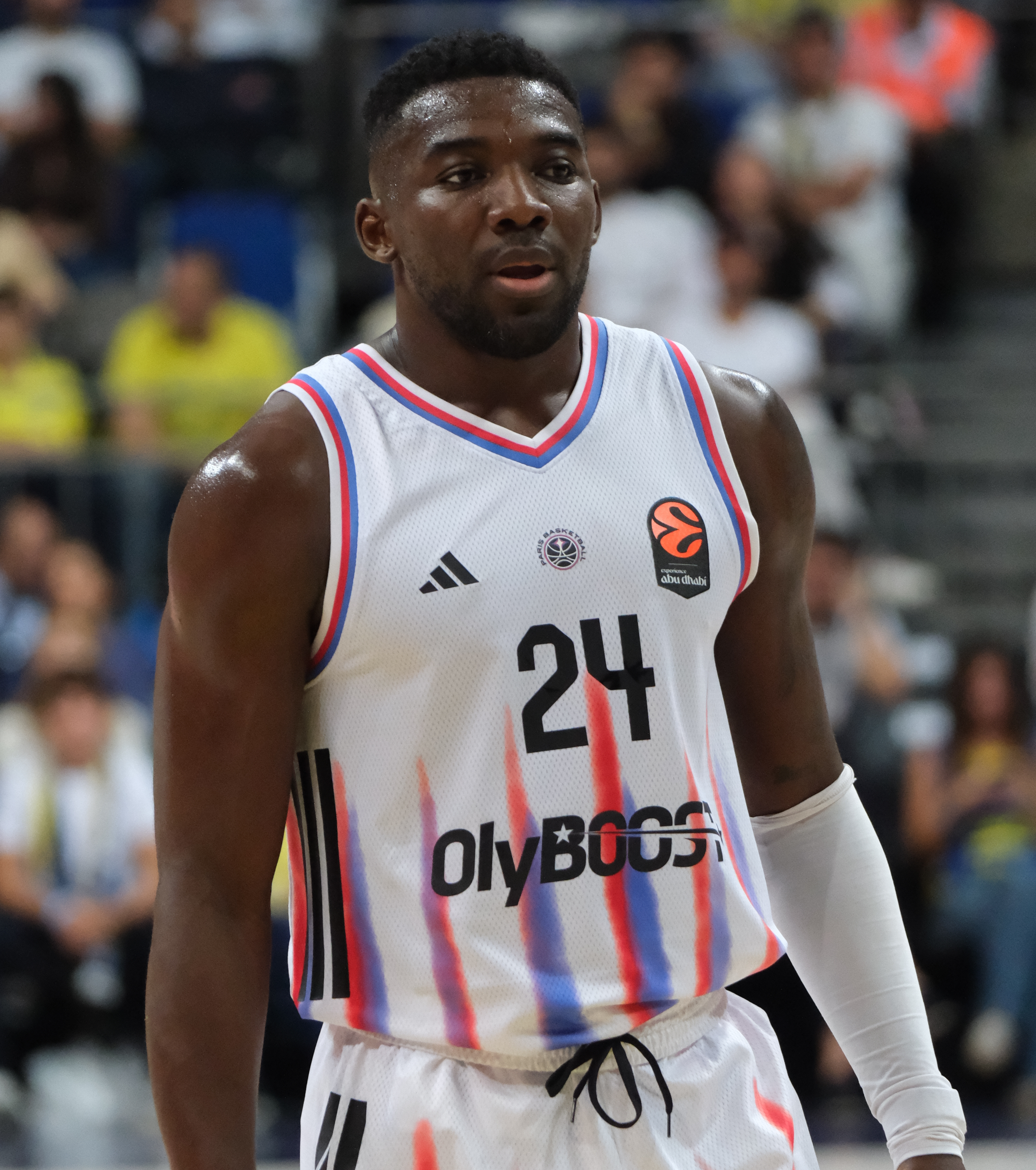
- Ouattara with Paris Basketball in 2025

No. 24 – Karşıyaka Basket
- Position: Shooting guard / small forward
- League: Basketbol Süper Ligi

Personal information
- Born: January 24, 1992 (age 34) Tepa, Ghana
- Listed height: 6 ft 4 in (1.93 m)
- Listed weight: 220 lb (100 kg)

Career information
- NBA draft: 2014: undrafted
- Playing career: 2012–present

Career history
- 2012–2014: Élan Chalon
- 2014–2015: Denain Voltaire
- 2015–2017: AS Monaco
- 2017–2018: Long Island Nets
- 2018–2020: AS Monaco
- 2020–2021: Real Betis
- 2021–2024: AS Monaco
- 2024–2026: Paris Basketball
- 2026–present: Karşıyaka Basket

Career highlights
- 3× French League champion (2023–2025); 2× French Cup winner (2023, 2025); 2× French League Cup winner (2016, 2017)
- Stats at Basketball Reference

Billy Yakuba Ouattara (born January 24, 1992, in Tepa, Ghana) is a Ghanaian-French professional basketball player for Karşıyaka Basket of the Turkish Basketbol Süper Ligi (BSL).

== Professional career ==
Ouattara first began his professional career out in France with the Élan Chalon of the LNB Pro A in 2012 as a 20-year-old. He played with that team for two seasons before signing a one-year deal with the ASC Denain-Voltaire PH, who were a part of the LNB Pro B at that time. During that year, he helped the team make it to the LNB Pro B Finals before ultimately losing the series to Hyères-Toulon Var Basket. On July 24, 2015, Ouattara signed with the AS Monaco Basket out in Monaco, returning to the Pro A that year. During his second season at Monaco, Ouattara was named a French Pro A All-Star and helped Monaco win the Leaders Cup Championship over the ASVEL Basket in 2017.

Ouattara signed a two-way contract with the Brooklyn Nets of the NBA on July 21, 2017, becoming the first foreign born player to sign a two-way deal with an NBA team. Under the terms of the deal, he would have planned to split time between the Brooklyn Nets and their G League affiliate, the Long Island Nets, with a majority of his time being spent with the Long Island affiliate team. However, due to injury problems throughout the year, he would never get a chance to play with the Brooklyn Nets squad, having only played in one G League game with the Long Island Nets during that time. On December 17, 2017, Ouattara was waived by the Nets. On January 17, 2018, Ouattara was reacquired by the Long Island Nets.

On March 30, 2018, Ouattara signed for the remainder of the 2017–18 season with Monaco.

On July 17, 2020, he signed with Coosur Real Betis of the Liga ACB.

On July 20, 2021, he signed with AS Monaco of the French LNB Pro A and the EuroLeague.

On August 7, 2024, he signed with Paris Basketball of the LNB Pro A.

On October 13, 2026, he signed with Karşıyaka Basket of the Turkish Basketbol Süper Ligi (BSL).

== National team career ==
Because of the unavailability of a Ghanaian national team, he has been a member of the French national team.

== Career statistics ==
Legend
GP	Games played	GS	Games started	MPG	Minutes per game
FG%	Field-goal percentage	3P%	3-point field-goal percentage	FT%	Free-throw percentage
RPG	Rebounds per game	APG	Assists per game	SPG	Steals per game
BPG	Blocks per game	PPG	Points per game	PIR	Performance index rating
**Bold**	Career high

=== EuroLeague ===
Year	Team	GP	GS	MPG	FG%	3P%	FT%	RPG	APG	SPG	BPG	PPG	PIR
2021–22	Monaco	30	**21**	**14.2**	.500	**.500**	**.727**	**1.9**	**.3**	.3	.0	4.1	**3.6**
2022–23	Monaco	**35**	15	11.2	.460	.354	.500	1.0	**.3**	**.4**	—	3.7	2.4
2023–24	Monaco	26	20	11.9	**.513**	.479	.714	1.5	.1	.2	.0	**4.2**	3.3
Career		91	56	12.4	.488	.434	.654	1.4	.2	.3	.0	4.0	3.0

=== EuroCup ===
Year	Team	GP	GS	MPG	FG%	3P%	FT%	RPG	APG	SPG	BPG	PPG	PIR
2013–14	Élan Chalon	8	0	6.1	.429	.167	—	.9	.4	.1	—	1.6	0.9
2018–19	Monaco	14	**7**	**24.0**	.429	**.469**	**.824**	**3.4**	**1.1**	.6	.1	**10.4**	**9.2**
2019–20	Monaco	**16**	4	22.9	**.451**	.441	.640	3.1	.8	**.7**	**.2**	9.0	8.6
Career		38	11	19.8	.439	.392	.714	2.7	.8	.6	.1	8.0	7.2

=== Basketball Champions League ===
Year	Team	GP	GS	MPG	FG%	3P%	FT%	RPG	APG	SPG	BPG	PPG
2016–17	Monaco	16	15	24.0	.458	.389	.682	2.6	.7	.9	.1	10.4
Career		16	15	24.0	.458	.389	.682	2.6	.7	.9	.1	10.4

=== Domestic leagues ===
Year	Team	League	GP	MPG	FG%	3P%	FT%	RPG	APG	SPG	BPG	PPG
2012–13	(France) Élan Chalon	Pro A	3	3.7	.400	—	—	1.0	—	—	—	1.3
2013–14	(France) Élan Chalon	Pro A	15	5.9	.385	.308	.714	.5	.1	.1	.1	2.6
2014–15	(France) Denain Voltaire	Pro B	41	17.8	.456	.309	.803	2.5	1.1	.5	.2	9.1
2015–16	(France) Monaco	Pro A	38	26.3	.510	.382	.688	2.9	.9	.9	.2	12.4
2016–17	(France) Monaco	Pro A	32	23.9	.514	.400	.782	3.3	.9	.7	.1	11.8
2017–18	(France) Monaco	Pro A	1	21.0	.583	.667	—	3.0	1.0	1.0	1.0	12.0
2017–18	(United States) Long Island Nets	G League	12	15.7	.427	.176	.765	2.0	.3	.5	.2	7.4
2018–19	(France) Monaco	LNB Élite	39	25.3	.463	.421	.746	3.7	1.3	.7	.3	11.5
2019–20	(France) Monaco	LNB Élite	25	25.4	.458	.418	.625	4.4	.6	.6	.3	11.0
2020–21	(Spain) Real Betis	ACB	30	22.2	.438	.308	.811	4.1	.6	.9	.0	9.1
2021–22	(France) Monaco	LNB Élite	43	20.9	.470	.402	.800	2.9	.6	.5	.1	7.0
2022–23	(France) Monaco	LNB Élite	38	17.7	.478	.388	.857	2.0	.7	.4	.1	7.0
2023–24	(France) Monaco	LNB Élite	40	17.5	.430	.333	.719	2.2	.5	.4	.0	6.0
