= Sergiy Gladyr =

Ukrainian basketball player (born 1988)

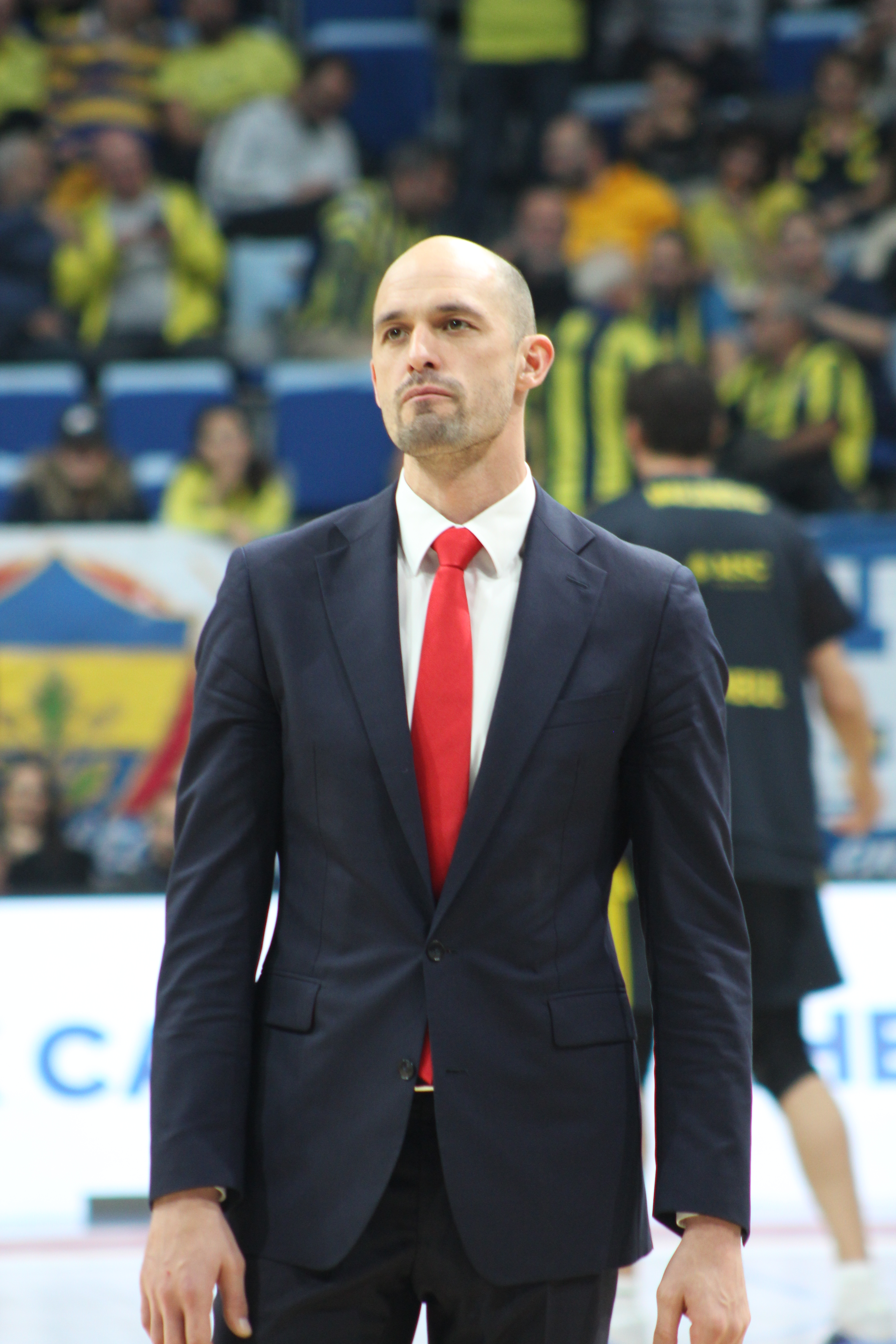
- Gladyr in 2024

Galatasaray
- Title: Assistant coach
- League: Basketbol Süper Ligi; Champions League

Personal information
- Born: 17 October 1988 (age 38) Mykolaiv, Ukrainian SSR, Soviet Union
- Listed height: 6 ft 5 in (1.96 m)
- Listed weight: 190 lb (86 kg)

Career information
- NBA draft: 2009: 2nd round, 49th overall pick
- Drafted by: Atlanta Hawks
- Playing career: 2004–2019
- Position: Shooting guard

Career history

Playing
- 2004–2005: Mykolaiv-2
- 2005–2006: Orlan Symferopol
- 2006–2009: Mykolaiv
- 2009–2012: Manresa
- 2012–2013: Fuenlabrada
- 2013–2014: JSF Nanterre
- 2014–2015: SLUC Nancy
- 2015–2019: AS Monaco

Coaching
- 2021–2026: AS Monaco (assistant)
- 2026: AS Monaco (interim)
- 2026–present: Galatasaray (assistant)

Career highlights
- As player: French Cup winner (2014); 3× French League Cup winner (2016–2018); French League Cup MVP (2017); As head coach: French League champion (2026); French Cup winner (2026); As assistant coach: EuroCup champion (2021); 2× French League champion (2023, 2024); French Cup winner (2023); French League Cup winner (2026); French Supercup winner (2025)
- Stats at Basketball Reference

Sergiy Viktorovych Gladyr (Ukrainian: Сергій Вікторович Гладир; born 17 October 1988) is a Ukrainian professional basketball coach and former player who is currently an assistant coach for Galatasaray of the Turkish Basketbol Süper Ligi and the Champions League (BCL). He was selected with the 49th overall pick by the Atlanta Hawks in the 2009 NBA draft.

== Professional career ==
Gladyr began his career with one of the smallest teams in the Ukrainian Super League, MBС Mykolaiv.

Gladyr shot 47% on three-point shots and 90% on free throws in the Ukrainian Super League, during the 2007–08 season, before taking a slight step back in his shooting percentages in the 2008–09 season (shooting 36% from three-point range and 81% from the free throw line respectively). During the 2008–09 season, he exploded for a season high of 36 points against Khimik Yuzhny, in a game where he got to the free throw line 19 times. Gladyr helped MBС Mykolaiv to a fifth-place finish in the Ukrainian Super League in the 2008–09 season, by averaging 15.4 points per game. In April 2009, he was selected for the Ukrainian Basketball All-Star Game, where he recorded a game-high 24 points and nine assists. At the same event, he also won the 3-point shootout competition by defeating BC Kyiv's Manuchar Markoishvili in the final round.

In July 2009, Gladyr signed a three-year deal with Bàsquet Manresa of the Liga ACB. In August 2012, he signed with Baloncesto Fuenlabrada for the 2012–13 season.

On 1 October 2013 Gladyr signed a one-year deal with the French EuroLeague team JSF Nanterre.

On 21 August 2014 he signed with SLUC Nancy Basket for the 2014–15 season. In 33 games of the French Pro A he averaged 12.1 points and 3.5 rebounds per game.

On 25 August 2015 it was announced that he signed with İstanbul BB of the Turkish Basketball League, however the team rescinded the contract after he failed the physical. On September 9, he signed with AS Monaco Basket of the French LNB Pro A.

=== NBA ===
Gladyr was drafted by the NBA team the Atlanta Hawks in the second round of the 2009 NBA draft, with the 49th pick overall. He did not play for an NBA summer league team after the draft since the Atlanta Hawks did not field a team, but he did show up for the Hawks rookie mini-camp. He played for the Hawks in the NBA Summer League in 2010 and 2013.

In 2017, his draft rights were traded to the Cleveland Cavaliers.

== National team career ==
=== Youth national teams ===
Gladyr represented Ukraine at the youth levels. He played at the 2006 FIBA Europe Under-18 Championship, where he averaged 17.3 points, 5.7 rebounds, and 1.3 assists while shooting 39.6% from three-point range. He later appeared for the national team at the 2008 FIBA Europe Under-20 Championship in Riga, Latvia, acting as the team's primary offensive option. Over 8 tournament games, he averaged 17.1 points, 3.8 rebounds, and 2.4 assists in 29.5 minutes per game. He also helped the U20 squad secure a silver medal at the 2007 FIBA Europe Under-20 Championship Division B tournament.

=== Senior national team ===
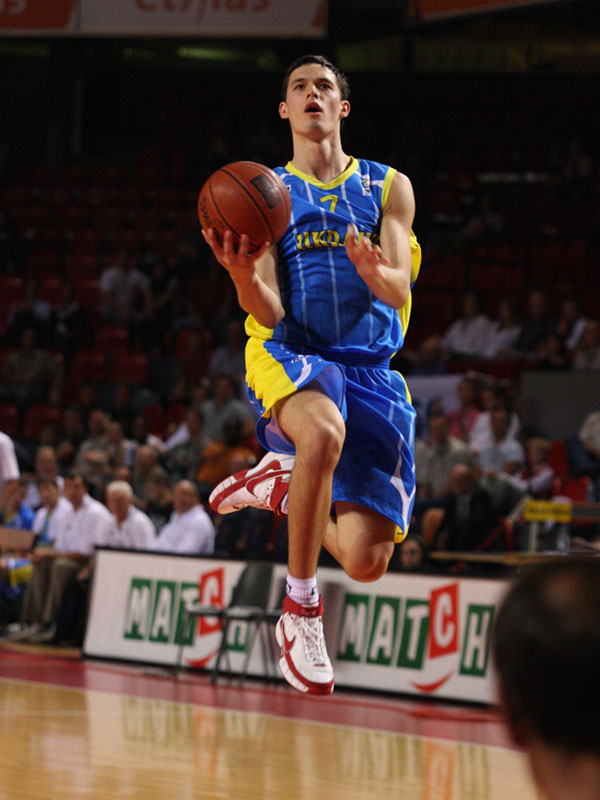
Gladyr playing for Ukraine in 2008

As a member of the senior Ukrainian national team, Gladyr made his debut during the FIBA EuroBasket 2009 qualification tournament in 2008. He later played at the FIBA EuroBasket 2011 in Lithuania, where he averaged 4.5 points and 3.0 rebounds per contest. Following an impressive qualification round in 2012 where he averaged 13.6 points per game, Gladyr played a pivotal role for Ukraine at FIBA EuroBasket 2013 in Slovenia. He appeared in all 11 matches, posting 12.0 points, 5.0 rebounds, and 1.5 assists per game, helping Ukraine secure a historic sixth-place finish and qualify for their first-ever global tournament. The following year, Gladyr represented Ukraine at the 2014 FIBA Basketball World Cup in Spain. He played in all 5 group stage games, averaging 6.0 points and 1.0 rebounds before Ukraine was eliminated. He later returned to the national side in 2017 during the 2019 World Cup qualifiers, averaging of 10.9 points, 5.0 rebounds, and 2.3 assists over 8 games.

== Player profile ==
Standing at 1.97 m (6 ft 5 1/2 in), Gladyr mainly played as a shooting guard. He was primarily known for his long-range shooting, which was his main offensive strength. During his tenure with AS Monaco, he made 9 out of 10 three-point attempts in a single game. His athleticism also enabled him to drive past defenders to finish at the basket.

== Personal life ==
Sergiy Gladyr is married to Olena Khomrova, a Ukrainian fencer. They have a daughter.
