= 2023 Pro A Leaders Cup =

- Season: 2022-23
- Duration: 17–19 February 2023
- Games played: 7
- Teams: 8

Regular season
- Season MVP: (France) Nando De Colo

Finals
- Champions: ASVEL (2nd title)
- Runners-up: JL Bourg

The 2023 LNB Pro A Leaders Cup season was the 25th edition of this tournament, the ninth since it was renamed as Leaders Cup. The event included the eight top teams from the first half of the 2022–23 Pro A regular season and was played in Saint-Chamond, Loire. The two previous years the competition was cancelled, in 2021 due to the COVID-19 pandemic and in 2022 due to lack of funds. ASVEL won their second ever title after beating JL Bourg in the Final.

== Bracket ==
Quarterfinals
JDA Dijon	83
Limoges CSP	65
AS Monaco	92
JL Bourg	102
Cholet Basket	77
Le Mans	84
Metropolitans 92	65
ASVEL	72

Semifinals
JDA Dijon	77
JL Bourg	94
Le Mans	65
ASVEL	90

Final
JL Bourg	74
ASVEL	83

== Final ==
February 19, 2023	JL Bourg	74–83	ASVEL	Arena Saint-Etienne Métropole, Lyon
18:30 (CET)	Scoring by quarter: 17-22, 8-23, 22-19, 27-19
	Pts: Floyd 23; Rebs: Mike 10; Asts: Benitez 6	Boxscore	Pts: De Colo 20; Rebs: Kahudi 9 Asts: Bost 4
