= Georgy Adams =

French Polynesian basketballer (born 1967)

Georgy Adams (born 9 March 1967) is a former French Polynesian basketball player who played as a winger. He was the first French Polynesian selected for the France men's national basketball team.

Adams was born in Papeete, but moved to France when he was 16 to pursue a career as a professional basketballer. He played with Olympique Antibes, Limoges CSP and ASVEL Basket. He was selected 73 times for the French team, and played for France in EuroBasket 1991, EuroBasket 1993, and EuroBasket 1997. He later coached AS Monaco Basket. He currently manages the Polynesian Basketball Federation. He began a hotel business in Papeete after the 2013 FIFA Beach Soccer World Cup.
