= Jordan Loyd =

American basketball player (born 1993)

- Loyd with Anadolu Efes in 2026

No. 3 – Anadolu Efes
- Position: Shooting guard / point guard
- League: BSL; EuroLeague

Personal information
- Born: July 27, 1993 (age 33) Chicago, Illinois, U.S.
- Listed height: 6 ft 4 in (1.93 m)
- Listed weight: 210 lb (95 kg)

Career information
- High school: Milton (Alpharetta, Georgia)
- College: Furman (2011–2012); Indianapolis (2013–2016)
- NBA draft: 2016: undrafted
- Playing career: 2016–present

Career history
- 2016–2017: Fort Wayne Mad Ants
- 2017–2018: Hapoel Eilat
- 2018–2019: Toronto Raptors
- 2018–2019: →Raptors 905
- 2019–2020: Valencia
- 2020–2021: Crvena zvezda
- 2021–2022: Zenit Saint Petersburg
- 2022–2024: AS Monaco
- 2024: Maccabi Tel Aviv
- 2024–2025: AS Monaco
- 2025–present: Anadolu Efes

Career highlights
- NBA champion (2019); VTB United League Supercup winner (2026); 2× French League champion (2023, 2024); VTB United League champion (2022); ABA League champion (2021); Serbian League champion (2021); French Cup winner (2023); Serbian Cup winner (2021); French League Finals MVP (2023); All-ABA League Team (2021); All-NBA G League First Team (2019); All-VTB United League Second Team (2022); All-Israeli Premier League Second Team (2018); Israeli Premier League League All-Star (2018); First-team All-GLVC (2016); GLVC All-Defensive Team (2016)
- Stats at NBA.com
- Stats at Basketball Reference

Jordan Kenneth Loyd (born July 27, 1993) is an American–born naturalised Polish professional basketball player for Anadolu Efes of the Turkish Basketbol Süper Ligi (BSL) and the EuroLeague, and Poland national team. He won an NBA championship in 2019 with the Toronto Raptors. He played college basketball for the Furman Paladins and Indianapolis Greyhounds.

== Early life and college career ==
Loyd attended Milton High School in Milton, Georgia, where he led Milton to a playoff appearance in each of his final two seasons, including a state championship as a junior in 2009–10. Loyd earned all-conference and team MVP honors as a senior after leading his squad to a top-five national ranking.

In 2011–12 in his freshman year at Furman University, he averaged 6 points, 3.4 rebounds and 1.7 assists per game. In 2012-13 he redshirted. In 2013–14 in his sophomore year, Loyd transferred from Furman to the University of Indianapolis, where he quickly became a key part of the UIndy bench, averaging double-digits minutes. On 2014–15 in his junior year he averaged 15.6 points, 4.5 rebounds, and 2.9 assists per game with a .484 field goal percentage, and a .420 percentage from 3-point range.

In 2015-16 Loyd finished his final Greyhound season averaging 20.9 points, 6.3 rebounds, and 2.9 assists, while shooting 50 percent from the field, 41 percent from 3-point range and 86 percent from the foul line. Loyd's name is all over the UIndy record book, as he finishes 25th all-time in scoring (1,213), fifth in career free throw percentage (.839), seventh in free throws made (329), 10th in 3-point percentage (.424), tied for 12th in 3-pointers made (132) and 16th in career scoring average (16.2). On March 2, 2016, Loyd earned a spot in the All-GLVC First team and Defensive team.

== Professional career ==
=== Fort Wayne Mad Ants (2016–2017) ===
Loyd went undrafted in the 2016 NBA draft. On October 31, 2016, Loyd was selected with the 48th overall pick in the 2016 NBA D-League draft by the Fort Wayne Mad Ants. In 49 games played during the 2016–17 season, Loyd averaged 15.1 points, 4.2 rebounds and 4 assists per game.

=== Hapoel Eilat (2017–2018) ===
On June 27, 2017, Loyd joined the Indiana Pacers and the Toronto Raptors for the 2017 NBA Summer League.

On August 2, 2017, Loyd signed with the Israeli team Hapoel Eilat for the 2017–18 season. On January 4, 2018, Loyd recorded a career-high 30 points, along with 11 rebounds and 2 assists in an 85–69 win over Ironi Nes Ziona, he was subsequently named Israeli League Round 11 MVP. On March 2, 2018, Loyd participated in the Israeli League All-Star Game as a replacement for Derwin Kitchen.

Loyd led Eilat to the 2018 Israeli League Playoffs, where they eventually lost to Hapoel Holon. Loyd finished the season as the league third-leading scorer with 17.4 points per game and also averaged 4.9 rebounds, 3.6 assists and 1.6 steals per game, with an .860 free three percentage (7th in the league). On June 8, 2018, Loyd earned a spot in the All-Israeli League Second Team.

=== Toronto Raptors (2018–2019) ===
On June 25, 2018, Loyd signed a two-year deal with the Turkish team Darüşşafaka. Four days later, Loyd joined the Toronto Raptors and the Boston Celtics for the 2018 NBA Summer League. On August 7, 2018, after impressing during the Summer League, Loyd opted out of his deal with Darüşşafaka and signed a two-way contract with the Toronto Raptors. On October 29, 2018, he made his NBA debut playing two minutes in a 109–124 loss to the Milwaukee Bucks.

Loyd won a championship with the Raptors after they defeated the Golden State Warriors in the 2019 NBA Finals. Loyd became known as the "Random Guy in a Suit" due to being beside Kawhi Leonard during the famous Game 7 buzzer beater in the Eastern Conference Semifinals against the Philadelphia 76ers, which he recognized by wearing a shirt with this slogan during the Raptors Championship parade. Although Loyd did not play in the playoffs nor Finals, Loyd was credited as an important part of the Raptors' championship versus the Warriors, as Loyd was used as a fill-in for Stephen Curry during Raptors' practices, simulating Curry for defensive game planning.

On August 2, 2019, Loyd was waived by the Raptors.

=== Valencia (2019–2020) ===
On August 5, 2019, Loyd signed a one-year deal with Valencia of the Spanish Liga ACB and the EuroLeague. On October 13, 2019, Loyd tied his career-high 30 points in his third league game with Valencia. He also recorded four rebounds, two assists and three steals in a 94–97 loss to Barcelona. He averaged 12.0 points, 2.2 assists and 1.0 steal per game.

=== Crvena Zvezda (2020–2021) ===
On July 1, 2020, Loyd signed with Crvena Zvezda. He was named Euroleague Round 2 MVP after scoring 30 points and adding 6 rebounds, 2 assists and 2 steals in a 90–73 win over Saski Baskonia. For the season, he averaged 16.2 points, 3.1 assists, and 1.0 steals while shooting .888 from the free throw line.

=== Zenit Saint Petersburg (2021–2022) ===
On June 14, 2021, Loyd signed a two-year contract, though he only played with the team for one year, with Russian club Zenit Saint Petersburg of the VTB United League and the EuroLeague. In 2021-22 he averaged 12.6 points, 4.2 rebounds, 4.4 assists, and 1.2 steals per game while shooting .849 from the free throw line.

=== AS Monaco (2022–2024) ===
On July 16, 2022, Loyd signed with AS Monaco Basket of the LNB Pro A and the EuroLeague, forming a formidable backcourt with Mike James and Élie Okobo. In 2022-23 he averaged 12.4 points, 2.7 rebounds, 3.0 assists, and 1.2 steals per game, while shooting .874 from the free throw line. In 2023–24 with the team he averaged 10.5 points, 2.8 rebounds, 2.0 assists, and 0.7 steals per game, while shooting .893 from the free throw line.

=== Maccabi Tel Aviv (2024) ===
On July 14, 2024, Loyd signed a two-year contract with Israeli powerhouse Maccabi Tel Aviv. On October 10, Loyd mutually parted ways with the Israeli club due to the unstable political situation in the region.

=== AS Monaco (2024–2025) ===
On October 12, 2024, Loyd returned to the AS Monaco after leaving Maccabi Tel Aviv in Israel due to war concerns. He signed until 2026. Loyd would be immediately available for the team despite having already played twice in the Euroleague with another team.

=== Anadolu Efes (2025–present) ===
On September 20, 2025, Loyd signed with Anadolu Efes of the Basketbol Süper Ligi (BSL). He made 34 appearances for the team during the 2025–26 season, averaging 11.4 points, 2.5 rebounds, and 1.9 assists.

On June 16, 2026, Loyd and the Efes agreed to a one–year contract extension.

== National team career ==
In August 2025, Loyd and fellow American-born player Jerrick Harding received Polish citizenship, and became eligible to play for the Poland national team. In the game against Slovenia at EuroBasket 2025, he scored 32 points, thanks to which Poland defeated the rival 105–95. Loyd, together with Mateusz Ponitka, led Poland to the quarterfinals, finished as the 5th top scorer of the tournament, and was selected to the FIBA EuroBasket All-Tournament Second Team.

== Career statistics ==
Legend
GP	Games played	GS	Games started	MPG	Minutes per game
FG%	Field-goal percentage	3P%	3-point field-goal percentage	FT%	Free-throw percentage
RPG	Rebounds per game	APG	Assists per game	SPG	Steals per game
BPG	Blocks per game	PPG	Points per game	PIR	Performance index rating
**Bold**	Career high

=== NBA ===
†	Denotes seasons in which Loyd won the NBA Finals

==== Regular season ====
Year	Team	GP	GS	MPG	FG%	3P%	FT%	RPG	APG	SPG	BPG	PPG
2018–19†	Toronto	12	0	4.6	.444	.500	.818	.7	.5	—	—	2.4
Career		12	0	4.6	.444	.500	.818	.7	.5	—	—	2.4

=== National team ===
Tournament	Pos.	GP	MPG	FG%	3P%	FT%	RPG	APG	SPG	BPG	PPG
EuroBasket 2025	6/24	7	32	49.0	42.2	87.5	3.3	2	1.3	0.3	22.4

=== EuroLeague ===
Year	Team	GP	GS	MPG	FG%	3P%	FT%	RPG	APG	SPG	BPG	PPG	PIR
2019–20	Valencia	18	9	21.5	.417	**.429**	.774	1.9	2.4	.7	.1	11.1	8.8
2020–21	Crvena zvezda	29	27	27.2	.425	.311	.906	3.6	3.2	1.2	**.2**	**17.3**	**16.5**
2021–22	Zenit	23	22	27.1	.497	.347	.833	**4.0**	**3.9**	1.0	.1	13.2	14.4
2022–23	Monaco	**34**	**29**	25.3	.441	.371	.899	2.4	2.7	**1.3**	.1	12.3	13.4
2023–24	Monaco	20	12	22.5	.392	.349	.902	2.7	2.0	.8	.1	10.5	8.9
2024–25	Maccabi Tel Aviv	2	2	**28.0**	**.522**	.286	**1.000**	2.5	1.5	.5	.0	15.5	13.5
2024–25	Monaco	33	17	20.8	.436	.374	.890	2.9	1.7	.6	.1	9.0	9.3
Career		159	116	25.2	.431	.359	.881	2.9	2.6	.9	.1	12.4	12.1

=== Domestic leagues ===
Year	Team	League	GP	MPG	FG%	3P%	FT%	RPG	APG	SPG	BPG	PPG
2016–17	(United States) F. W. Mad Ants	D-League	49	28.4	.436	.342	.871	4.2	4.0	.9	.3	15.1
2017–18	(Israel) Hapoel Eilat	Ligat HaAl	38	33.3	.482	.399	.860	4.9	3.6	1.7	.2	17.4
2018–19	(United States) Raptors 905	G League	41	35.5	.480	.363	.865	5.5	6.1	1.8	.3	22.5
2019–20	(Spain) Valencia	ACB	23	22.7	.464	.404	.843	1.7	2.1	1.2	.1	12.8
2020–21	(Serbia) Crvena zvezda	ABA	30	25.2	.443	.385	.872	2.8	3.2	1.0	.2	16.0
2021–22	(Russia) Zenit	VTBUL	21	27.0	.374	.284	.859	4.5	5.0	1.3	.3	12.1
2022–23	(France) Monaco	LNB Élite	25	25.1	.466	.430	.845	3.2	3.6	1.3	.1	12.3
2023–24	(France) Monaco	LNB Élite	22	21.0	.462	.420	.900	3.3	1.8	.7	.0	11.3
2024–25	(France) Monaco	LNB Élite	31	22.7	.458	.428	.915	2.8	2.2	.9	.0	11.5

=== College ===
Year	Team	GP	GS	MPG	FG%	3P%	FT%	RPG	APG	SPG	BPG	PPG
2011–12	Furman	27	12	20.9	.370	.264	.684	3.4	1.7	.6	.1	6.0
2012–13	Furman	Redshirt										
2013–14	Indianapolis	16	2	17.2	.544	.488	.786	3.9	1.1	.4	.1	8.7
2014–15	Indianapolis	30	29	29.0	.484	.420	.833	4.5	2.9	1.1	.3	15.6
2015–16	Indianapolis	29	29	31.0	.501	.411	.858	6.3	2.5	1.8	.2	20.9
Career		102	72	25.6	.478	.401	.820	4.6	2.2	1.0	.2	13.5
