= AS Monaco Basket =

French-Monégasque basketball club

AS Monaco
- Nickname: La Roca Team; Les Rouges et Blancs (The Red and Whites); Roca Boys
- Founded: 1928; 98 years ago
- Dissolved: 2026; 0 years ago
- Arena: Salle Gaston Médecin
- Capacity: 5,000
- Location: Fontvieille, Monaco
- Team colors: Red, White and Gold
- Championships: 1 EuroCup; 3 French Championships; 2 French Cups; 4 French League Cup; 1 French Supercup
- Website: asmonaco.basketball
Home	Away

AS Monaco Basket, commonly referred to as AS Monaco or simply Monaco, was a French-registered Monaco-based professional basketball club. They were part of the Monaco-based multi-sports club of A.S. Monaco, which was founded in 1924, with the club's basketball section founded four years later in 1928. Monaco was the runner-up of the EuroLeague in 2025, and has won the EuroCup title in 2021. In domestic competitions, they won three French League titles, two French Cups, four Leaders Cups, and one French Supercup. They played their home games at Salle Gaston Médecin.

The club was excluded from the top division LNB Élite before the start of the 2026–27 season, due to financial difficulties, eventually announcing insolvency and restarting at an amateur level at the fifth tier Nationale Masculine 3.

== History ==
About four years after the parent athletic club, A.S. Monaco, was itself founded, A.S. Monaco Basket was founded in 1928. They finished as runners-up in the French top-tier level Nationale 1 (current LNB Élite) following the 1950 season, which is regarded as one of their greatest successes in their history. Monaco also won the LNB Pro B (French 2nd Division) championship in the 1973 season, with one of the greatest offenses on the European continent.

A.S. Monaco Basket joined the Nationale 1 for the 1973–74 season, where they finished in ninth place. They made their first appearance in the European 3rd-tier level FIBA Korać Cup in the 1974–75 season, where they lost in the group stage to other notable teams, such as the French League club ASVEL Basket, the Bulgarian League club Levski Sofia, and the Italian League club AMG Sebastiani Basket. They entered the same tournament again in the 1982–83 season, but lost to Dynamo Moscow in the semifinals qualification battle, in the Top 16 group stage, despite a far better finish in the tournament overall.

Entering the 1980s, Monaco was in the process of securing their title as one of the most dangerous teams in French basketball. They reached the finals game of the French Federation Cup, where they lost to Limoges CSP, by a score of 96–81. The Red and Whites also became a threat in the LNB Élite (French 1st Division), what the league had been renamed to, after former NBA player, Robert Smith, joined the team in 1985. Smith was named the 1987 French League All-Star Game MVP.

After Smith left the team, Monaco found themselves descending in the league. They were relegated to the second division LNB Pro B, later in the decade, and eventually ended up in the Nationale 1 Division. They would not return to the LNB Pro A, the highest division of basketball in France, for many years to come. In 2014, A.S. Monaco Basket was crowned the champions of the French third-tier league, the Nationale Masculine 1 (NM1), and they returned to the LNB Pro B (French 2nd Division).

In the 2014–15 season, Monaco became the French 2nd-tier LNB Pro B champions, and they were finally promoted back to the top-tier league in France, the LNB Pro A. In 2015, the Ukrainian businessman and philanthropist, Sergey Dyadechko, became the President of A.S. Monaco Basket. In the 2015–16 season, Monaco won the 2016 edition of the French Pro A League Cup, after beating Élan Chalon in the finals, by a score of 99–74. Monaco player, Jamal Shuler, was named the French Pro A Leaders Cup MVP.

In the 2016–17 season, Monaco returned to European-wide competitions, when it qualified for one of the pan-European secondary level competitions, the FIBA Basketball Champions League. They finished the season in third place. In 2017, the charity fund, DSF, founded by the club's owner, Dyadechko, became a sponsor of A.S. Monaco Basket. The club also played in the FIBA Champions League, during the 2017–18 season, in which they finished in second place, after they lost to the Greek League club AEK Athens in the final, by a score of 100–94. The club won the 2017 French Pro A League Cup and the 2018 French Pro A League Cup titles. They also finished in second place in the French Pro A League, in the 2017–18 season.

In European-wide competitions, Monaco spent the next three seasons (2018–19, 2019–20, and 2020–21) playing in the other pan-European secondary level competition, the EuroCup, subsequently winning it in 2020–21. In the 2021–22 season, Monaco made its debut in the EuroLeague, the highest pan-European level. Finishing seventh in the regular season with a 15–13 record, Monaco qualified for the playoffs where they lost 2–3 to the second-seeded Olympiacos.

The following season, Monaco was eligible for another EuroLeague season because of their good performance the previous season. They made the playoffs for a second season in a row.

On April 22, 2023, Monaco won its first major trophy when it won its maiden French Basketball Cup, after beating ASVEL in the final. Élie Okobo was the cup final's MVP after his 20-point performance. In the same 2022–23 season, Monaco reached new height on the continental level after reaching the 2023 EuroLeague Final Four after beating Maccabi Tel Aviv in the playoffs. They became the third French League club ever to reach the Final Four (after ASVEL and Limoges) and the first to do so in 26 years.

In the 2024–25 season, the Vassilis Spanoulis-coached team made it to the EuroLeague Final Four, and advanced to the final after upsetting first-seed Olympiacos. Monaco became the first French team in 32 years to play in the final of the European highest level league, and only the second team to reach the stage, following Limoges CSP in the 1992–93 FIBA European League. In the championship game, the Roca Team eventually lost to Fenerbahçe.

== Arena ==
A.S. Monaco Basket plays its home games at the 5,000 seat Salle Gaston Médecin, which is a part of the Stade Louis II sports complex.

Monaco was originally supposed to play its 2021–22 EuroLeague games in the 5,249 seat Azur Arena, which is located nearby in Antibes. The decision was later overturned, and the team instead played in its usual home arena in Monaco.

== Logos ==
A.S. Monaco Basket Amateur

A.S. Monaco Basket

== Honours and other achievements ==
Honours
Type	Competition	Titles	Seasons
International	EuroCup	1	2020–21
Domestic	French League	3	2022–23, 2023–24, 2025–26
Domestic	French Cup	2	2022–23, 2025–26
Domestic	French League Cup	4	2016, 2017, 2018, 2026
Domestic	French Supercup	1	2025

- Record title holders

=== Other Achievements ===
==== International competitions ====
- EuroLeague
  - Runners-up (1): 2024–25
  - Third place (1): 2022–23
- EuroCup
  - Champions (1): 2020–21
- FIBA Champions League
  - Runners-up (1): 2017–18
  - Third place (1): 2016–17

==== Domestic competitions ====
- French League
  - Champions (3): 2022–23, 2023–24, 2025–26
  - Runners-up (5): 1949–50, 2017–18, 2018–19, 2021–22, 2024–25
- French Cup
  - Champions (2): 2022–23, 2025–26
  - Runners-up (1): 1982–83
- French League Cup
  - Champions (4): 2016, 2017, 2018, 2026
  - Runners-up (1): 2025
- French Supercup
  - Champions (1): 2025
- French Pro B
  - Champions (2): 1972–73, 2014–15
- French NM1
  - Champions (1): 2013–14

==== Other competitions ====
- Berlin, Germany Invitational Game
  - Winners (1): 2019

== Season by season ==
Season	Tier	Division	Pos.	French Cup	Leaders Cup	European competitions		
2008–09	4	NM2	9th					
2009–10	4	NM2	7th					
2010–11	4	NM2	1st					
2011–12	4	NM2	1st	Round of 44				
2012–13	3	NM1	1st	Round of 40				
2013–14	3	NM1	1st	Round of 44				
2014–15	2	Pro B	1st	Round of 16				
2015–16	1	Pro A	3rd	Quarterfinals	Champion			
2016–17	1	Pro A	5th	Quarterfinals	Champion	3 Champions League	3rd	17–4
2017–18	1	Pro A	2nd	Quarterfinals	Champion	3 Champions League	RU	17–4
2018–19	1	Pro A	2nd	Round of 16		2 EuroCup	T16	9–7
2019–20	1	Pro A	–^{1}	–^{1}	Semifinalist	2 EuroCup	QF	10–6
2020–21	1	Pro A	4th	Quarterfinalist		2 EuroCup	C	17–6
2021–22	1	Pro A	2nd	Semifinalist		1 EuroLeague	PO	17–16
2022–23	1	Pro A	1st	Champion	Quarterfinalist	1 EuroLeague	3rd	25–16
2023–24	1	Élite	1st	Semifinalist	Semifinalist	1 EuroLeague	PO	25–14
2024–25	1	Élite	2nd	Semifinalist	Runner-up	1 EuroLeague	RU	25–16
2025–26	1	Élite	1st	Champion	Champion	1 EuroLeague	PO	23–20

^1 Cancelled due to the COVID-19 pandemic in Europe.

== Players ==
=== Notable players ===
Note: Flags indicate national team eligibility at FIBA-sanctioned events. Players may hold other non-FIBA nationalities not displayed.

Criteria

To appear in this section a player must have either:

- Set a club record or won an individual award while at the club
- Played at least one official international match for their national team at any time
- Played at least one official NBA match at any time.

France:

- (France) Georgy Adams
- (France) Cyril Akpomedah
- (France) Éric Beugnot
- (France) Petr Cornelie
- (France) Moustapha Fall
- (France) Damien Inglis
- (France) Mouhammadou Jaiteh
- (France) Paul Lacombe
- (France) Yoan Makoundou
- (France) Elie Okobo
- (France) Yakuba Ouattara
- (France) Jean Perniceni
- (France) Amara Sy
- (France) Philip Szanyiel
- (France) / (United States) Terry Tarpey
- (France) Kim Tillie
- (France) Ali Traoré
- (France) Léo Westermann

Europe:

- (Greece) / (United States) Nick Calathes
- (Greece) Georgios Papagiannis
- (Serbia) Danilo Anđušić
- (Croatia) Ivan Buva
- (Croatia) Damjan Rudež
- (Bosnia and Herzegovina) Elmedin Kikanović
- (Lithuania) Donatas Motiejūnas
- (Poland) Aaron Cel
- (Ukraine) Kyrylo Fesenko
- (Ukraine) Sergii Gladyr

United States:

- (United States) Dwayne Bacon
- (United States) / (Bulgaria) Dee Bost
- (United States) John Brown
- (United States) Eric Buckner
- (United States) / (Azerbaijan) Nik Caner-Medley
- (United States) / (Kazakhstan) Anthony Clemmons
- (United States) Norris Cole
- (United States) D.J. Cooper
- (United States) Aaron Craft
- (United States) / (Uganda) Brandon Davies
- (United States) Chris Evans
- (United States) Rob Gray
- (United States) / (Azerbaijan) Donta Hall
- (United States) Mike James
- (United States) / (Hungary) Jarrod Jones
- (United States) Dru Joyce
- (United States) / (Cameroon) Paris Lee
- (United States) Jordan Loyd
- (United States) Darrel Mitchell
- (United States) / (Montenegro) Derek Needham
- (United States) / (Serbia) DeMarcus Nelson
- (United States) J.J. O'Brien
- (United States) Gerald Robinson
- (United States) Jamal Shuler
- (United States) Robert Smith
- (United States) Mike Stewart
- (United States) / (Georgia (country)) Will Thomas
- (United States) Kemba Walker
- (United States) / (Bosnia and Herzegovina) Zack Wright

Rest of Americas & Oceania & Middle East:

- (Canada) Dylan Ennis
- (Israel) (Trinidad and Tobago) (United States) Khadeen Carrington
- (Jamaica) Adrian Uter
- (Australia) Brock Motum

Africa:

- (Senegal) Ibrahima Fall Faye
- (Tunisia) Mehdi Hafsi
- (Nigeria) Derrick Obasohan

== Head coaches ==
Head Coach	Years
(United States) Bill Sweek	1985–1990
(France) Jean-Pierre Baldwin	1999–2000
(France) Philippe Beorchia	2000–2003
(France) Claude Palanca	2003–2004
(France) Stéphane Dao	2004–2007
(France) Georgy Adams	2007–2010
(France) Jean-Michel Sénégal	2010–2013
(Montenegro) Savo Vučević	2013–2015
(France) Philippe Beorchia	2015
(Montenegro) Zvezdan Mitrović	2015–2018
(Slovenia) Sašo Filipovski	2018–2019
(Serbia) Saša Obradović	2019–2020
(Montenegro) Zvezdan Mitrović	2020–2021
(Serbia) Saša Obradović	2021–2024
(Greece) Vassilis Spanoulis	2024–2026
(Ukraine) Sergiy Gladyr (Georgia (country)) Manuchar Markoishvili	2026
