= 2020 Pro A Leaders Cup =

- Season: 2019-20
- Duration: 14–16 February 2020
- Games played: 7
- Teams: 8

Regular season
- Season MVP: (United States) Rasheed Sulaimon

Finals
- Champions: JDA Dijon (2nd title)
- Runners-up: ASVEL

The 2020 LNB Pro A Leaders Cup season was the 24th edition of this tournament, the eighth since it was renamed as Leaders Cup. The event included the eight top teams from the first half of the 2019–20 Pro A regular season and was played in Disneyland Paris. JDA Dijon won their second ever title after beating ASVEL in the Final.

== Bracket ==
Quarterfinals
ASVEL	91
SIG Strasbourg	72
Metropolitans 92	82
Cholet Basket	74
AS Monaco	82
Nanterre 92	70
JDA Dijon	104
JL Bourg	79

Semifinals
ASVEL	88
Metropolitans 92	59
AS Monaco	81
JDA Dijon	83

Finals
ASVEL	69
JDA Dijon	77

== Final ==
February 16, 2020	ASVEL	69–77	JDA Dijon	Disneyland Paris, Paris
17:00 (CET)	Scoring by quarter: 13-23, 23-17, 13-13, 20-24
	Pts: Taylor 17; Rebs: Kahudi 7 Asts: Taylor 7	Boxscore	Pts: Sulaimon 20; Rebs: Chassang 10; Asts: Julien 7
