= 2024 Pro A Leaders Cup =

- Season: 2023-24
- Duration: 16–18 February 2024
- Games played: 7
- Teams: 8

Regular season
- Season MVP: (United States) (North Macedonia) T. J. Shorts

Finals
- Champions: Paris Basketball (1st title)
- Runners-up: Nanterre 92

The 2024 LNB Pro A Leaders Cup season was the 26th edition of this tournament, the tenth since it was renamed as Leaders Cup. The event included the eight top teams from the first half of the 2023–24 Pro A regular season and was played in Saint-Chamond, Loire. Paris Basketball won the title for the first time beating Nanterre 92 in the Final.

== Bracket ==
Quarterfinals
AS Monaco	94
Le Mans	81
Paris Basketball	71
Saint-Quentin	67
JL Bourg	109
SLUC Nancy Basket	79
ASVEL	78
Nanterre 92	82

Semifinals
AS Monaco	93
Paris Basketball	98
JL Bourg	95
Nanterre 92	100

Final
Paris Basketball	90
Nanterre 92	85

== Final ==
February 18, 2024	Paris Basketball	90–85	Nanterre 92	Arena Saint-Etienne Métropole, Lyon
18:30 (CET)	Scoring by quarter: 26-20, 22-22, 17-27, 25-16
	Pts: Shorts 23; Rebs: Jantunen 8 Asts: Ngouama 5	Boxscore	Pts: Bibbins 20; Rebs: Fall-Faye 7 Asts: Rodriguez 5
