= 2019 Pro A Leaders Cup =

- Season: 2018-19
- Duration: 15–17 February 2019
- Games played: 7
- Teams: 8

Regular season
- Season MVP: (United States) Jarell Eddie

Finals
- Champions: SIG Strasbourg (2nd title)
- Runners-up: JL Bourg

The 2019 LNB Pro A Leaders Cup season was the 23rd edition of this tournament, the seventh since it was renamed as Leaders Cup. The event included the eight top teams from the first half of the 2018–19 Pro A regular season and was played in Disneyland Paris. SIG Strasbourg won their second ever title after beating JL Bourg in the Final.

== Bracket ==
Quarterfinals
Élan Béarnais	87
Levallois Metropolitans	94
ASVEL	86
JL Bourg	88
JDA Dijon	79
SIG Strasbourg	89
Nanterre 92	75
Limoges CSP	98

Semifinals
Levallois Metropolitans	79
JL Bourg	86
SIG Strasbourg	72
Limoges CSP	63

Finals
JL Bourg	97
SIG Strasbourg	98

== Final ==
February 17, 2019	SIG Strasbourg	98–97	JL Bourg	Disneyland Paris, Paris
17:00 (CET)	Scoring by quarter: 24-28, 18-22, 30-17, 26-30
	Pts: Eddie 26; Green 26; Rebs: Eddie 6 Asts: Beyhurst 5	Boxscore	Pts: Peacock 28; Rebs: Ndoye 7 Asts: Sim 9
