= 2018 Pro A Leaders Cup =

- Season: 2017-18
- Duration: 16–18 February 2018
- Games played: 7
- Teams: 8

Regular season
- Season MVP: (United States) D. J. Cooper

Finals
- Champions: Monaco (3rd title)
- Runners-up: Le Mans Sarthe

The 2018 LNB Pro A Leaders Cup season was the 22nd edition of this tournament, the sixth since it was renamed as Leaders Cup. The event included the eight top teams from the first half of the 2017–18 Pro A regular season and was played in Disneyland Paris. AS Monaco Basket won their third consecutive title after beating Le Mans Sarthe in the Final.

== Bracket ==
Quarterfinals
Monaco	93
JL Bourg	66
SIG Strasbourg	70
ASVEL	77
Le Mans Sarthe	71
Cholet	61
Limoges CSP	74
Nanterre 92	84

Semifinals
Monaco	79
ASVEL	66
Le Mans Sarthe	82
Nanterre 92	74

Finals
Monaco	83
Le Mans Sarthe	78

== Final ==
February 18, 2018	AS Monaco	83–78	Le Mans Sarthe	Disneyland Paris, Paris
17:00 (UTC +1)	Scoring by quarter: 27-16, 19-22, 17-17, 20-23
	Pts: Robinson 19; Rebs: Craft 7 Asts: Cooper 7	Boxscore	Pts: Riley 20; Rebs: Travis 8 Asts: Cobbs 6

Monaco	Le Mans Sarthe
