= 2025 Pro A Leaders Cup =

- Season: 2024-25
- Duration: 14–16 February 2025
- Games played: 7
- Teams: 8

Regular season
- Season MVP: (United States) Trevor Hudgins

Finals
- Champions: Le Mans (4th title)
- Runners-up: AS Monaco

The 2025 LNB Pro A Leaders Cup season was the 27th edition of this tournament, the eleventh since it was renamed as Leaders Cup. The event included the eight top teams from the first half of the 2024–25 Pro A regular season and was played in Caen. Le Mans won their fourth title after beating AS Monaco in the Final.

== Bracket ==
Quarterfinals
AS Monaco	101
JL Bourg	88
ASVEL	90
SIG Strasbourg	75
Cholet Basket	91
Le Mans	93
Paris Basketball	86
Saint-Quentin	92

Semifinals
AS Monaco	91
ASVEL	78
Le Mans	88
Saint-Quentin	85

Final
AS Monaco	96
Le Mans	104

== Final ==
February 16, 2025	AS Monaco	96–104	Le Mans	Palais des Sports de Caen la mer, Caen
19:00 (CET)	Scoring by quarter: 14-28, 25-27, 27-22, 30-27
	Pts: James 29; Rebs: Jaiteh 9 Asts: James 5 Okobo 5	Boxscore	Pts: Hudgins 25; Rebs: Delaunay 8 Asts: DiLeo 5
