= Mathieu Wojciechowski =

French-Polish basketball player

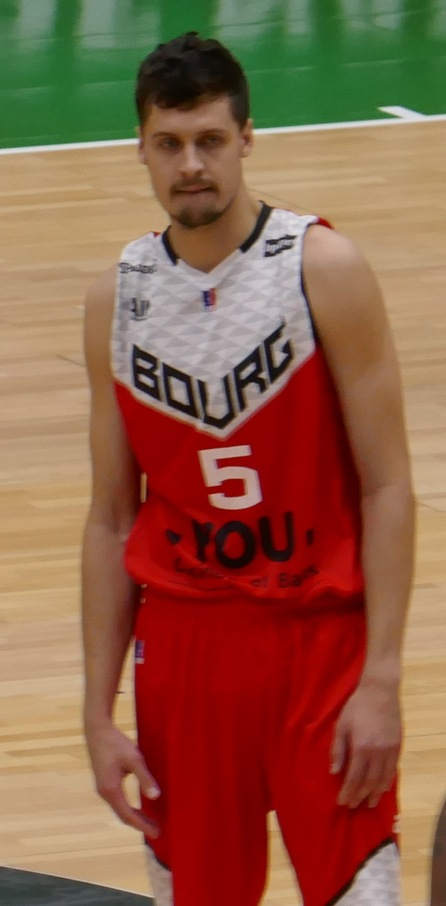
- Wojciechowski with JL Bourg in 2017.

No. 1 – Legia Warsaw
- Position: Power forward
- League: PLK

Personal information
- Born: 20 October 1992 (age 34) Calais, France
- Listed height: 6 ft 8 in (2.03 m)
- Listed weight: 208 lb (94 kg)

Career information
- NBA draft: 2012: undrafted
- Playing career: 2011–present

Career history
- 2011–2013: BCM Gravelines
- 2013–2015: ESSM Le Portel
- 2015–2017: Limoges CSP
- 2017–2018: JL Bourg
- 2018–2019: MKS Dąbrowa Górnicza
- 2019–2020: Śląsk Wrocław
- 2020–2022: ESSM Le Portel
- 2022–2023: CSP Limoges
- 2024–2025: Fos Provence Basket
- 2025–2026: Chorale Roanne Basket
- 2026–present: Legia Warsaw

Career highlights
- Pro B champion (2026); French 2nd Division Most Improved Player (2015)

Mathieu Wojciechowski (born 20 October 1992) is a French-Polish basketball player for Legia Warsaw of the Polish Basketball League (PLK). Wojciechowski usually plays at the power forward position.

== Professional career ==
In July 2015, Wojciechowski signed with Limoges CSP of the French LNB Pro A. He spent the 2017-18 season with JL Bourg, but left the team on 16 August 2018 with two years remaining on his contract.

On 11 July 2019 he signed with Śląsk Wrocław of the PLK.

On 22 June 2020 he signed with ESSM Le Portel of the LNB Pro A.

On 8 June 2022 he signed with CSP Limoges of the LNB Pro A.

On January 8, 2024, he signed with Fos Provence Basket of the LNB Pro A.

On August 7, 2026, he signed with Legia Warsaw of the Polish Basketball League (PLK).
