= 2022–23 French Basketball Cup =

- Season: 2022–23
- Duration: 20 September 2022 – 22 April 2023
- Teams: 64

Finals
- Champions: AS Monaco
- Runners-up: ASVEL

Awards
- Final MVP: (France) Elie Okobo

The 2022–23 French Basketball Cup season (French: 2022–23 Coupe de France de Basket) was the 46th season of the domestic cup competition of French basketball.The previous winner of the cup was Élan Béarnais. The competition started on 20 September 2022 and ended 22 April 2023. AS Monaco won the competition.

== Bracket ==
Round of 16
SLUC Nancy Basket	78
Le Mans	86
Antibes Sharks	85
Dijon	89
Élan Béarnais	92
Le Portel	83
AS Monaco	107
Metropolitans 92	76
Limoges CSP	79
JL Bourg	94
SIG Strasbourg	101
Boulazac	83
ASVEL	89
Chorale Roanne Basket	88
Saint-Chamond Basket	76
Cholet Basket	93

Quarterfinals
Le Mans	89
Dijon	77
Élan Béarnais	78
AS Monaco	98
JL Bourg	71
SIG Strasbourg	88
ASVEL	85
Cholet Basket	79

Semifinals
Le Mans	78
AS Monaco	87
SIG Strasbourg	69
ASVEL	85

Final
AS Monaco	90
ASVEL	70

== Final ==
22 April 2023	AS Monaco	90–70	ASVEL	Paris
16:45 (CET)	Scoring by quarter: 33–15, 16–17, 25–18, 16–20
	Pts: James 20; Okobo 20; Rebs: Brown 8 Asts: Okobo 7	Boxscore	Pts: De Colo 12; Rebs: Fall 8 Asts: De Colo 5	Arena: Accor Arena

== See also ==
- 2022–23 Pro A season
