= Leaders Cup =

French professional basketball competition

- Current season, competition or edition: 2026 Pro A Leaders Cup
- Formerly: Tournoi des As Cup (1988–1993); Semaine des As Cup (2003–2012)
- Sport: Basketball
- Founded: Founded: 1988 (Tournoi des As Cup); Re-founded: 2003 (Semaine des As Cup)
- No. of teams: 8
- Country: France
- Continent: Europe
- Most recent champion: AS Monaco (4th title) (2026)
- Most titles: Pau-Orthez; Le Mans; AS Monaco (4 titles each)
- Broadcaster: Sport+
- Related competitions: LNB Élite; French Cup (French Federation Cup); Match des Champions (French Supercup)
- Website: LNB.fr (in French)

The Leaders Cup, sometimes referred to as the French Basketball League Cup and previously known as the Tourney des As Cup and Semaine des As Cup, is the annual national league cup competition for teams from the top-tier level of French professional basketball, the LNB Élite. It was created in its current form in 2003 (after originally being founded in 1988). It is organized by the Ligue Nationale de Basketball (LNB), which also organizes the top two leagues of French professional basketball (Pro A, and Pro B).

Inspired by the Spanish Copa del Rey (Spanish Basketball King's Cup), the Final Eight format has always been used. At the end of the first half of the regular season, the top eight teams (or the top seven teams and the tournament's host team) from the first division French LNB Élite League qualify. The eight teams compete in a playoff that is held at one venue over four days, which eventually produces a winner. The Final Eight is one of the highlights of the French basketball calendar. At one point in time, the winner of the competition was entitled to a place in the now defunct FIBA EuroChallenge competition.

== History ==
=== Tournoi des As (1988 – 1993) ===
The Tournoi des As (Tournament of Aces) was the ancestor competition of the current Leaders Cup, being held from 1988 to 1993. At the end of the season, the top 4 teams from the top-tier level French League qualified. Over 2 days of competition, the first placed team of the regular season faced the fourth placed team, and the second placed team faced the third placed team, in semifinals games. The 2 losing teams of the first day would meet for the third place spot, while the two semifinals winners would compete for the cup title.

=== Semaine des As (2003 – 2012) ===
After being interrupted for ten years, the cup returned in 2003, as the Semaine des As (Week of Aces), and it was largely inspired by the Spanish Copa del Rey (Spanish Basketball King's Cup) format. The first edition was organised in Pau, France. The competition was traditionally organized in February. It featured the top eight placed teams of the top-tier level French League, at the end of the regular season's halfway point. It was held in a playoff format over a period of four days. The competition was often highly disputed, producing a different winner every year, except in 2009, when Le Mans won its second title, after previously winning the 2006 edition.

=== Leaders Cup (2013 – present) ===
The Leaders Cup is the current name of the competition. Gravelines beat Strasbourg, by a score of 77–69, in the first edition of the cup competition, that was played under the Leaders Cup name.

== Results ==
Season	Winner	Score	Runners-up	Venue	Location	MVP
Tournoi des As (Tournament of Aces)
1988	Limoges CSP	88–85	Pitch Cholet			
1989	Mulhouse	82–80	Pitch Cholet			
1990	Limoges CSP	87–84	Pitch Cholet			
1991	Orthez	68–65	Limoges CSP			
1992	Pau-Orthez	83–75	Limoges CSP			
1993	Pau-Orthez	71–58	Pitch Cholet			
Semaine des As (Week of Aces)
2003	Pau-Orthez	101–80	Le Havre	Palais des Sports de Pau	Pau	
2004	JDA Dijon	62–60	Le Mans Sarthe	Palais des Sports de Mulhouse	Mulhouse	
2005	SLUC Nancy	112–76	BCM Gravelines	Maison des Sports de C-F	Clermont-Ferrand	
2006	Le Mans Sarthe	78–60	JL Bourg-en-Bresse	Palais des Sports de Dijon	Dijon	(United States) Eric Campbell
2007	Chorale Roanne	87–82	Le Mans Sarthe	Palais des Sports Jean Weille	Nancy	(United States) Marc Salyers
2008	Cholet	67–40	JA Vichy	Palais des Sports de Toulon	Toulon	(France) Nando de Colo
2009	Le Mans Sarthe	74–64	Orléans	Salle des Docks Océane	Le Havre	(Israel) David Blu
2010	ASVEL	70–69	Orléans	Astroballe	Villeurbanne	(Lithuania) Mindaugas Lukauskis
2011	BCM Gravelines	79–71	Élan Chalon	Palais des Sports de Pau	Pau	(France) Yannick Bokolo
2012	Élan Chalon	73–66	BCM Gravelines	Halle André Vacheresse	Roanne	(United States) Blake Schilb
Leaders Cup
2013	BCM Gravelines	77–69	SIG	Disneyland Paris	Paris	(France) Ludovic Vaty
2014	Le Mans Sarthe	74–64	JSF Nanterre	Disneyland Paris	Paris	(Brazil) João Paulo Batista
2015	SIG	60–58	Le Mans Sarthe	Disneyland Paris	Paris	(France) Antoine Diot
2016	Monaco	99–74	Élan Chalon	Disneyland Paris	Paris	(United States) Jamal Shuler
2017	Monaco	95–91	ASVEL	Disneyland Paris	Paris	(Ukraine) Sergii Gladyr
2018	Monaco	83–78	Le Mans Sarthe	Disneyland Paris	Paris	(United States) D. J. Cooper
2019	SIG	98–97	JL Bourg-en-Bresse	Disneyland Paris	Paris	(United States) Jarell Eddie
2020	JDA Dijon	77–69	ASVEL	Disneyland Paris	Paris	(United States) Rasheed Sulaimon
2021	Cancelled due to the COVID-19 pandemic in France					
2022	Cancelled due to economic problems					
2023	ASVEL	83–74	JL Bourg-en-Bresse	Arena Saint-Étienne Métropole	Saint-Chamond, Loire	(France) Nando de Colo
2024	Paris	90–85	Nanterre	Arena Saint-Étienne Métropole	Saint-Chamond, Loire	(North Macedonia) T. J. Shorts
2025	Le Mans	104–96	Monaco	Palais des Sports de Caen la mer	Caen	(United States) Trevor Hudgins
2026	Monaco	103–79	Le Mans	Arena Futuroscope	Chasseneuil-du-Poitou	(France) Elie Okobo

== Titles by team ==
Team	Winners	Runners-up	Winning years
Le Mans Sarthe	4	5	2006, 2009, 2014, 2025
Pau-Lacq-Orthez	4	0	1991, 1992, 1993, 2003
Monaco	4	1	2016, 2017, 2018, 2026
Limoges CSP	2	2	1988, 1990
BCM Gravelines	2	2	2011, 2013
ASVEL	2	2	2010, 2023
SIG	2	1	2015, 2019
JDA Dijon	2	0	2004, 2020
Cholet	1	4	2008
Élan Chalon	1	2	2012
Mulhouse	1	0	1989
SLUC Nancy	1	0	2005
Chorale Roanne	1	0	2007
Paris	1	0	2024
JL Bourg-en-Bresse	0	3	
Orléans	0	2	
Nanterre 92	0	2	
Le Havre	0	1	
JA Vichy	0	1	

== See also ==
- LNB Élite (French League)
- French Cup (French Federation Cup)
- Match des Champions (French Supercup)
