= 2017 Pro A Leaders Cup =

- Season: 2016–17
- Duration: 17–19 February 2017
- Games played: 7
- Teams: 8

Regular season
- Season MVP: (Ukraine) Sergiy Gladyr

Finals
- Champions: Monaco (2nd title)
- Runners-up: ASVEL

The 2017 LNB Pro A Leaders Cup season was the 21st edition of this tournament, the fifth since it was renamed as Leaders Cup. The event included the eight top teams from the first half of the 2016–17 Pro A regular season and was played in Disneyland Paris. AS Monaco Basket won their second consecutive title after beating ASVEL in the Final.

== Bracket ==
Quarterfinals
Pau-Orthez	76
Paris-Levallois Basket	65
Élan Chalon	62
ASVEL	80
Nanterre 92	77
SIG Strasbourg	71
Monaco	90
BCM Gravelines	85

Semifinals
Pau-Orthez	80
ASVEL	94
Nanterre 92	76
Monaco	81

Finals
ASVEL	91
Monaco	95

== Final ==
February 19, 2017	AS Monaco	95–91	ASVEL	Disneyland Paris, Paris
17:00 (UTC +1)	Scoring by quarter: 19-28, 46-48, 66-70, 95-91
	Pts: Gladyr, Bost 22; Rebs: Fofana 10; Asts: Wright 7	Boxscore	Pts: Hodge, Dragovic 18; Rebs: Nelson 7 Asts: Nelson 6

Monaco	ASVEL
