= Limoges CSP =

French professional basketball club

- Leagues: Pro A Champions League
- Founded: 1929; 97 years ago
- History: Limoges CSP (1929–present)
- Arena: Beaublanc
- Capacity: 6,506
- Location: Limoges, France
- Team colors: Green, white, gold
- Head coach: Arnaud Tessier
- Championships: 1 EuroLeague; 1 Saporta Cup; 3 Korać Cup; 11 French Championships; 6 French Cup; 2 French League Cup; 1 French Basketball Supercup
- Retired numbers: 3 (4, 7, 8)
- Website: limogescsp.com
Home	Away

Limoges Cercle Saint-Pierre, commonly referred to as Limoges CSP or CSP, is a professional basketball club based in the city of Limoges, France. The club competes in the highest tier, the LNB Élite, and has won the French championship 11 times, as well as the EuroLeague once, in 1993.

== History ==
The club was founded in 1929, but its peak was during the 1980s and 1990s, when they became the first French club to win a major European-wide title in a team sport, by winning the FIBA European League (EuroLeague) in 1993.

In the 1999–2000 season, Limoges won its 9th top-tier level French League title, but it was relegated to the French second division LNB Pro B, after winning it, because of financial problems. The club didn't get back to its old state for a long time, as it spent the next 3 years in the Pro A, but was relegated again in 2004 after finishing dead last. Starting with the 2004–05 season, Limoges played in the NM1, the French third division, due to continued financial problems. It took the club six seasons to eventually return to the Pro A.

In the 2013–14 season, Limoges returned to its old glory, as the team captured its 10th French League national championship, by beating Strasbourg IG 0–3 in the French League Finals. Alex Acker was named Finals MVP.

The club thus qualified for the 2014–15 EuroLeague by winning the French League championship, which would be their first appearance in the top European-wide league in 17 seasons. In the EuroLeague, Limoges lost 8 out of 10 games, managing to win against UNICS and Cedevita, before being relegated to the European-wide second tier level EuroCup. In the EuroCup Round of 32, Limoges was eliminated, after finishing 3rd in Group J. In the French Pro A, Limoges once again had a successful season. In the regular season, Limoges finished in 3rd place behind JSF Nanterre and Strasbourg IG, but in the French League playoffs, they made up for that. In the French League Finals, Limoges beat Strasbourg 1–3, to win back-to-back French League titles. Ousmane Camara was named Finals MVP. Under pressure from local authorities and after considering various options, Céline Forte finally agreed to the sale of the club on june 9. Following its takeover by Lionel Peluhet, the CSP was ultimately accepted into the BetClic Elite for the 2024-2025 season. On january 13, 2025 the day after a loss to Le Portel (77-98), head coach Jean-Marc Dupraz was suspended and replaced by his assistant Mikko Larkas. In april 2026, following a string of losses (10 out of the last 13 games), Dario Gjergja was suspended and replaced on an interim basis by Arnaud Tessier

== Arena ==
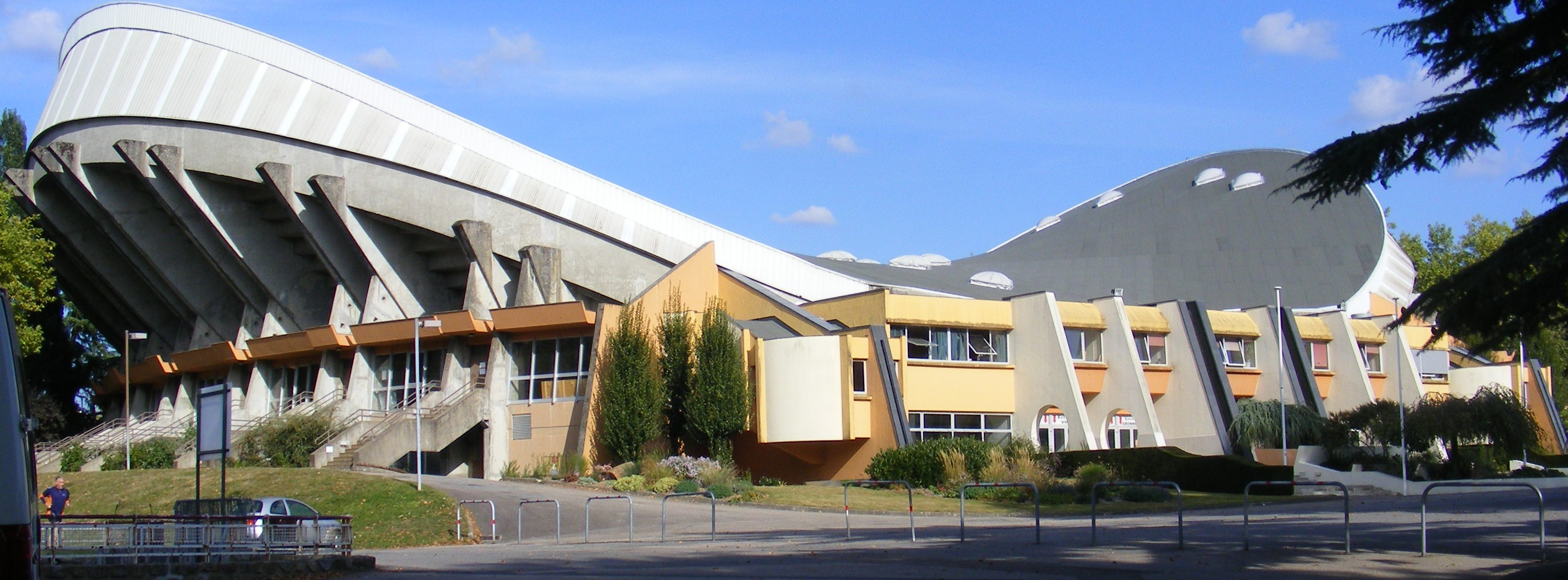
Palais des Sports de Beaublanc, the home arena of Limoges.

Limoges plays its home games at the Palais des Sports de Beaublanc, which has a seating capacity of 6,500 people. The Palais des sports was inaugurated on november 28, 1981, in the presence of Minister Charles Hernu and the senator-mayor of Limoges Louis Longequeue, CSP hosts ASVEL Basket for the occasion although the first match had already taken place on october 14, 1981. The project for a Palais des sports first emerged in 1955: at the initiative of Albert Chaminade (1912-2009), a proposal was put forward to roof over the 4,000-seat Beaublanc basketball court a facility that had been abandoned since the early 1960s.

The city of Limoges, through its mayor, Emile-Roger Lombertie has initiated the transformation of the Beaublanc site; the project includes the construction of two annex halls for the Beaublanc sports hall. The provisional schedule targets the completion of these two annex halls by mid-2027, followed by the restructuring of the sports hall itself (2027-2029).

== Roster ==
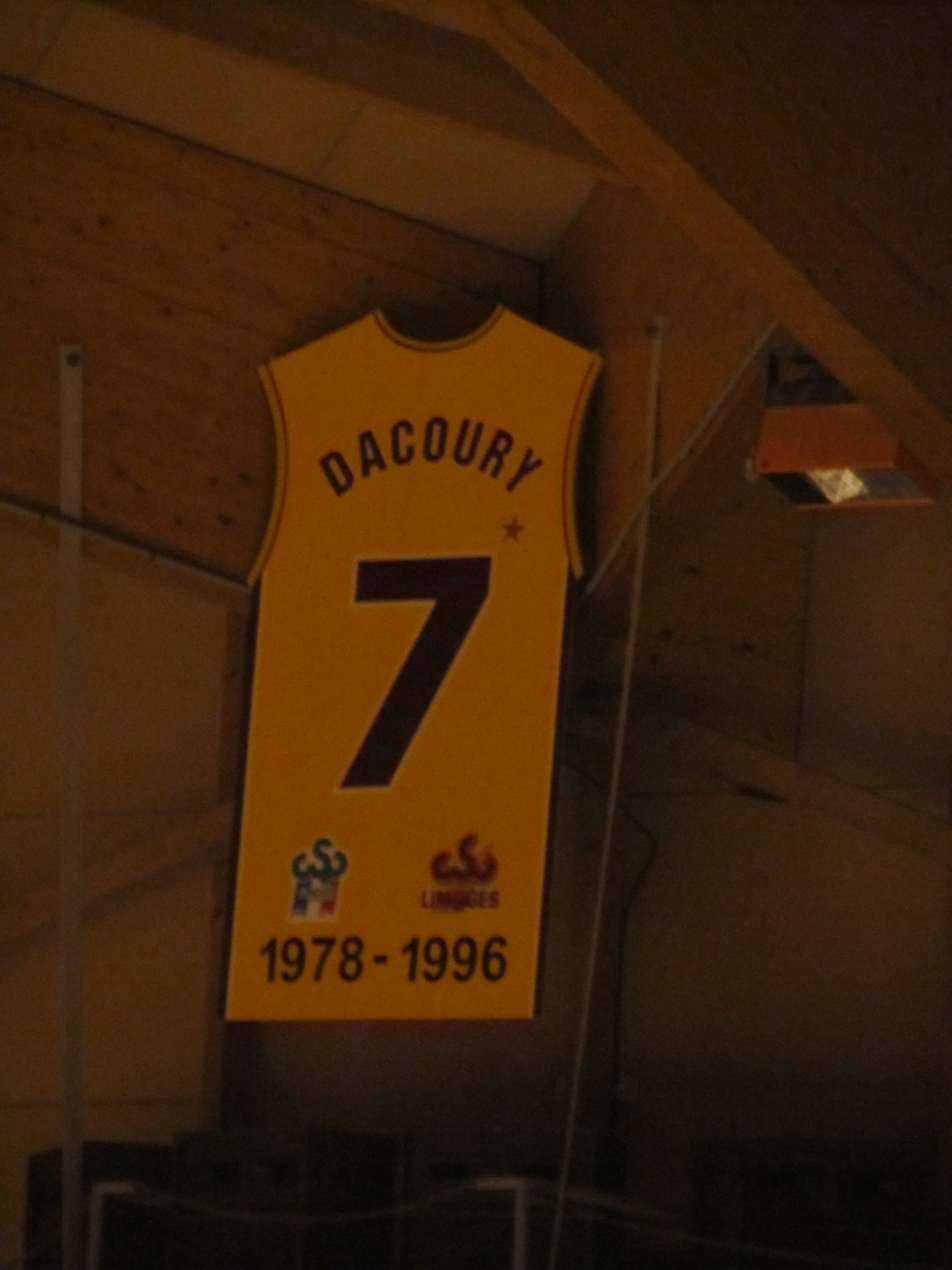
Dacoury's retired number 7 jersey

=== Retired numbers ===
Limoges CSP retired numbers
No.	Nat.	Player	Position	Tenure	Date Retired
4	(France)	Frédéric Forte	PG	1988–1989, 1991–1997	2020
7	(France)	Richard Dacoury	SG/SF	1978–1996	2010
8	(United States)	Ed Murphy	SG/SF	1981–1985	2016

=== Current roster ===
Note: Flags indicate national team eligibility at FIBA-sanctioned events. Players may hold other non-FIBA nationalities not displayed.

Limoges CSP roster
Players
Coaches

Pos.	No.	Nat.	Name	Ht.	Age
PG	0	(United States)	Horne, DJ	1.85 m (6 ft 1 in)	26 – 31 October 2000
PG	6	(France)	Albicy, Andrew	1.78 m (5 ft 10 in)	36 – 21 March 1990
PG	9	(New Zealand)	Webster, Tai	1.93 m (6 ft 4 in)	31 – 29 May 1995
C	13	(France)	Labeyrie, Louis	2.09 m (6 ft 10 in)	34 – 11 February 1992
SF	14	(France)	Invernizzi, Hugo	1.96 m (6 ft 5 in)	33 – 7 January 1993
G/F	15	(France)	Lang, Nicolas	1.98 m (6 ft 6 in)	36 – 1 May 1990
C	20	(United States)	Ware, Gavin	2.06 m (6 ft 9 in)	33 – 19 October 1993
C	27	(France)	Dossou, Jean-Fabrice	2.11 m (6 ft 11 in)	26 – 6 April 2000
G/F	29	(France)	Dubos, Clement	1.95 m (6 ft 5 in)	19 – 16 July 2007
SF	32	(Belgium)	Guisse, Mamadou	1.96 m (6 ft 5 in)	24 – 15 December 2001
SG	37	(Slovenia)	Stergar, Leon	1.93 m (6 ft 4 in)	26 – 17 March 2000
F/C	44	(Senegal)	Sene, Sidy	2.08 m (6 ft 10 in)	20 – 6 May 2006
G	73	(France)	Masdieu-Reynaert, Noam	1.91 m (6 ft 3 in)	21 – 21 January 2005
G	87	(France)	Masdieu-Reynaert, Yael	1.90 m (6 ft 3 in)	18 – 7 March 2008

Head coach

- (France) Arnaud Tessier

Assistant coach(es)

- (Croatia) Vladimir Nestorović
- (France) Jules Bosse

Legend

- (C) Team captain
- Injured

- Roster
Updated: November 3, 2026

== Honours ==
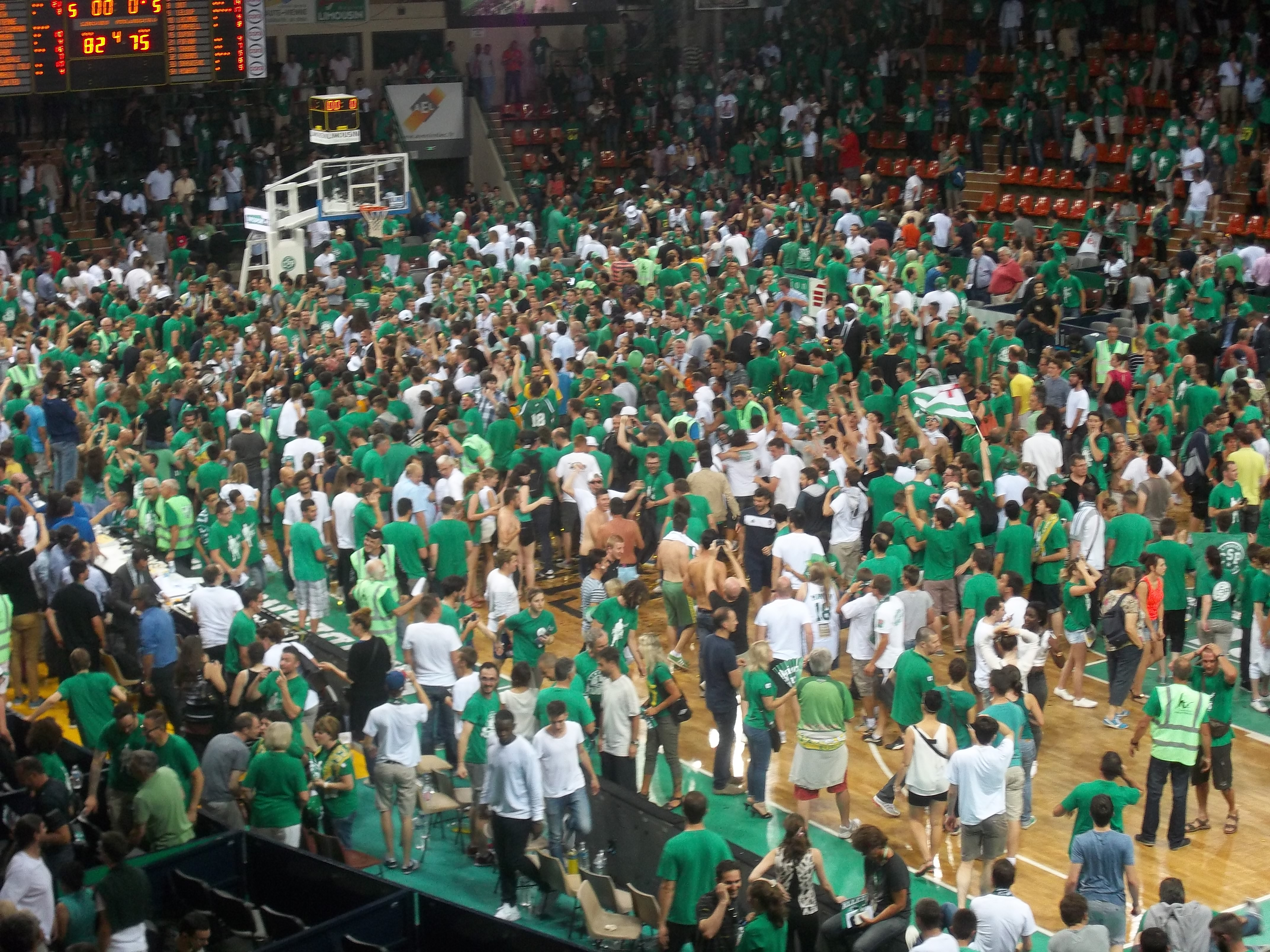
Limoges fans celebrating on their home floor, after winning the 2015 LNB Pro A championship

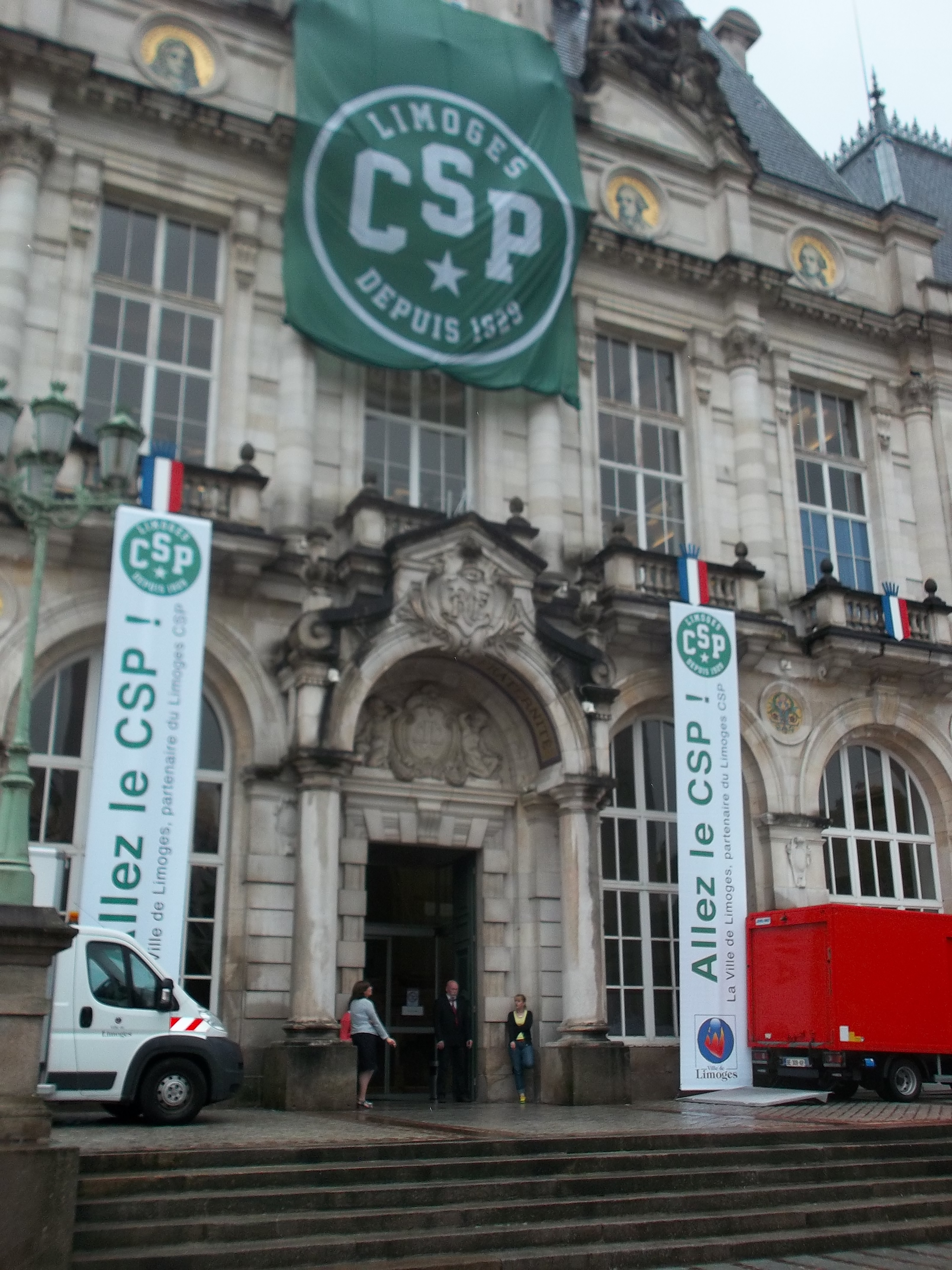
The city hall of Limoges, decorated in the colours of the team

=== Domestic competitions ===
- French League

Winners (11): 1982–83, 1983–84, 1984–85, 1987–88, 1988–89, 1989–90, 1992–93, 1993–94, 1999–00, 2013–14, 2014–15
Runners-up (4): 1986–87, 1990–91, 1991–92, 1997–98

- French Cup

Winners (1): 1999–00
Runners-up (2): 2010–11, 2011–12

- Leaders Cup

Winners (2): 1988, 1990
Runners-up (2): 1991, 1992

- French Super Cup

Winners (1): 2012

- Federation Cup (defunct)

Winners (3): 1981–82, 1982–83, 1984–85

- League Cup (defunct)

Winners (2): 1993–94, 1994–95

- French League Pro B

Winners (2): 2000–01, 2011–12

=== European competitions ===
- EuroLeague

Winners (1): 1992–93
3rd place (1): 1989–90
4th place (1): 1994–95
Final Four (3): 1990, 1993, 1995

- FIBA Saporta Cup (defunct)

Winners (1): 1987–88

- FIBA Korać Cup (defunct)

Winners (3): 1981–82, 1982–83, 1999–00
Runners-up (1): 1986–87

- European Basketball Club Super Cup (semi-official, defunct)

Runners-up (1): 1985

=== Worldwide competitions ===
- McDonald's Championship

3rd place (1): 1991
4th place (1): 1993

=== Other competitions ===
- FIBA International Christmas Tournament (defunct)

4th place (1): 1990

- Tournoi de Beaublanc

Winners (1): 2014

- Tournoi de Bourge

Winners (1): 2014

- Tarere, France Invitational Game

Winners (1): 2015

- St. Chamond & St. Étienne, France Invitational Game

Winners (1): 2015

=== Individual club awards ===
- Small Triple Crown

Winners (3): 1982–83, 1987–88, 1999–00

== Successive shirts ==
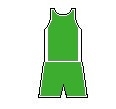
1929–1992

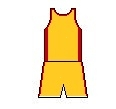
1992–2004

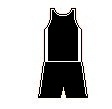
2004–2011

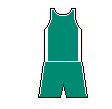
2011

== Supporters and rivalries ==
The club has a large fan-base, with a dedicated ultras group called Ultras Green.

== Season by season ==
Season by season results of the club in national league, national cup and European-wide competitions.

Season	Tier	League	Pos.	French Cup	Leaders Cup	European competitions	
1997–98	1	Pro A	2nd			1 Euroleague	GS
1998–99	1	Pro A	7th			2 Saporta Cup	R32
1999–00	1	Pro A	1st (Note: Relegated to Pro B due to financial problems.)	Champion		3 Korać Cup	C
2000–01	2	Pro B	1st				
2001–02	1	Pro A	11th				
2002–03	1	Pro A	14th				
2003–04	1	Pro A	18th (Note: Relegated one more league, until NM1, due to financial problems.)				
2004–05	3	NM 1	3rd				
2005–06	3	NM 1	2nd	Round of 32			
2006–07	2	Pro B	7th	Round of 32			
2007–08	2	Pro B	5th	Round of 32			
2008–09	2	Pro B	3rd	Quarterfinalist			
2009–10	2	Pro B	2nd	Semifinalist			
2010–11	1	Pro A	16th	Runner-up			
2011–12	2	Pro B	1st	Runner-up			
2012–13	1	Pro A	13th	Quarterfinalist			
2013–14	1	Pro A	1st	Round of 32	Quarterfinalist		
2014–15	1	Pro A	1st	Semifinalist	Quarterfinalist	1 Euroleague	RS
2015–16	1	Pro A	10th	Quarterfinalist		1 Euroleague	RS
2015–16	1	Pro A	10th	Quarterfinalist		2 Eurocup	R16
2016–17	1	Pro A	10th	Round of 16			
2017–18	1	Pro A	4th	Round of 64	Quarterfinalist	2 EuroCup	T16
2018–19	1	Pro A	7th	Round of 16	Semifinalist	2 EuroCup	T16
2019–20	1	Pro A	— (Note: Cancelled due to the COVID-19 pandemic in Europe.)	—		2 EuroCup	RS
2020–21	1	Pro A	9th	Semifinalist	—	Champions League	RS
2021–22	1	Pro A	5th	Round of 16	— (Note: Cancelled due to economic problems)		
2022–23	1	Pro A	15th	Round of 16	Quarterfinals	Champions League	R16
2023–24	1	Pro A	13th	Round of 32			
2024–25	1	Pro A	14th	Round of 64			

== International record ==
Season	Achievement	Notes
EuroLeague
1983–84	Semi-final group stage	6th place in a group with FC Barcelona, Banco di Roma Virtus, Jollycolombani Cantù, Bosna and Maccabi Tel Aviv
1985–86	Semi-final group stage	6th place in a group with Cibona, Žalgiris, Simac Milano, Real Madrid and Maccabi Tel Aviv
1988–89	Quarter-finals	5th place in a group with Maccabi Tel Aviv, FC Barcelona, Jugoplastika, Aris, Scavolini Pesaro, CSKA Moscow and Nashua EBBC
1989–90	Final Four	3rd place in Zaragoza, lost to Jugoplastika 83–101 in the semi-final, defeated Aris 103–91 in the 3rd place game
1990–91	Quarter-finals	8th place in a group with FC Barcelona, Pop 84, Scavolini Pesaro, Maccabi Tel Aviv, Aris, Bayer 04 Leverkusen and Kingston Kings
1992–93	Champions	defeated Real Madrid Teka 62–52 in the semi-final, defeated Benetton Treviso 59–55 in the final of the Final Four in Athens
1993–94	Quarter-finals	eliminated 2–1 by Panathinaikos, 75–68 (W) in Limoges, 48–59 (L) and 73–87 (L) in Athens
1994–95	Final Four	4th place in Zaragoza, lost to Real Madrid Teka 49–62 in the semi-final, lost to Panathinaikos 77–91 in the 3rd place game
FIBA Saporta Cup
1987–88	Champions	defeated Ram Joventut 96–89 in the final of European Cup Winners' Cup in Grenoble
1991–92	Quarter-finals	3rd place in a group with PAOK, Glaxo Verona, Sunair Oostende, Maccabi Rishon LeZion and Alba Berlin
1995–96	Quarter-finals	3rd place in a group with Taugrés, Žalgiris, Partizan, Bnei Herzliya and Sunair Oostende
FIBA Korać Cup
1981–82	Champions	defeated Šibenka, 90–84 in the final of Korać Cup in Padua
1982–83	Champions	defeated Šibenka, 94–86 in the final of Korać Cup in West Berlin
1986–87	Final	lost to FC Barcelona, 86–106 (L) in Barcelona and 86–97 (L) in Limoges
1999–00	Champions	defeated Unicaja, 80–58 (W) in Limoges and 51–60 (L) in Málaga in the double finals of Korać Cup
McDonald's Championship
1991	3rd	3rd place in Paris, lost to Los Angeles Lakers 101–132 in the semi-final, defeated Slobodna Dalmacija 105–91 in the 3rd place game
1993	4th	4th place in Munich, lost to Buckler Beer Bologna 85–101 in the semi-final, lost to Real Madrid Teka 119–123 in the 3rd place game

== The road to the European Cup victories ==
1981–82 FIBA Korać Cup

Round	Team	Home	Away
1st round	(Luxembourg) T71 Dudelange	108–56	92–83
2nd round	(Greece) Aris	106–77	77–88
Top 16	(Soviet Union) Spartak Leningrad	76–69	106–89
Top 16	(Spain) Cotonificio	101–90	89–93
Top 16	(Italy) Carrera Venezia	105–101	84–107
Semi-finals	(Socialist Federal Republic of Yugoslavia) Zadar	99–78	84–92
Final	(Socialist Federal Republic of Yugoslavia) Šibenka	90–84	

1982–83 FIBA Korać Cup

Round	Team	Home	Away
2nd round	Bye as title holder		
Top 16	(Socialist Federal Republic of Yugoslavia) Crvena zvezda	80–78	83–93
Top 16	(Czechoslovakia) Nová huť Ostrava	90–82	89–76
Top 16	(Italy) Banco di Roma	87–80	74–73
Semi-finals	(Soviet Union) Dynamo Moscow	92–79	86–93
Final	(Socialist Federal Republic of Yugoslavia) Šibenka	94–86	

1987–88 FIBA European Cup Winners' Cup

Round	Team	Home	Away
2nd round	(Finland) UU	108–104	123–94
Quarter-finals	(England) Polycell Kingston	122–109	108–106
Quarter-finals	(West Germany) Bayer 04 Leverkusen	93–86	111–92
Quarter-finals	(Socialist Federal Republic of Yugoslavia) IMT	114–103	102–93
Semi-finals	(Italy) Scavolini Pesaro	102–86	91–93
Final	(Spain) Ram Joventut	96–89	

1992–93 FIBA European League

Round	Team	Home	Away
2nd round	(England) Guildford Kings	71–57	72–72
Top 16	(Federal Republic of Yugoslavia) Partizan	Bye	
Top 16	(Greece) PAOK	60–58	57–67
Top 16	(Italy) Knorr Bologna	63–76	67–70
Top 16	(Spain) Marbella Joventut	65–73	78–62
Top 16	(Croatia) Cibona	83–52	62–58
Top 16	(Italy) Scavolini Pesaro	61–47	76–61
Top 16	(Israel) Maccabi Tel Aviv	75–63	69–70
Quarter-finals	(Greece) Olympiacos	59–53	67–70
Quarter-finals	(Greece) Olympiacos	60–58	67–70
Semi-final	(Spain) Real Madrid Teka	62–52	
Final	(Italy) Benetton Treviso	59–55	

1999–00 FIBA Korać Cup

Round	Team	Home	Away
1st round	Bye		
2nd round	(Portugal) Ovarense Aerosoles	93–84	80–66
2nd round	(Belgium) Telindus Racing Antwerpen	81–75	56–59
2nd round	(Spain) Jabones Pardo Fuenlabrada	90–77	73–63
Top 32	(Russia) UNICS	93–69	86–64
Top 16	(Ukraine) CSKA Kyiv	86–73	100–71
Quarter-finals	(Turkey) Türk Telekom	71–57	67–75
Semi-finals	(Spain) Casademont Girona	69–57	77–77
Finals	(Spain) Unicaja	80–58	51–60

== Notable players ==
Note: Flags indicate national team eligibility at FIBA-sanctioned events. Players may hold other non-FIBA nationalities not displayed.

Criteria

To appear in this section a player must have either:

- Set a club record or won an individual award while at the club
- Played at least one official international match for their national team at any time
- Played at least one official NBA match at any time.

- (France) Gregor Beugnot
- (France) Jim Bilba
- (France) Yann Bonato
- (France) Nobel Boungou Colo
- (France) Axel Bouteille
- (France) Ousmane Camara
- (France) Richard Dacoury
- (France) Yakhouba Diawara
- (France) Sekou Doumbouya
- (France) Stéphane Dumas
- (France) Vasco Evtimov
- (France) Apollo Faye
- (France) Mickaël Gelabale
- (France) Joseph Gomis
- (France) William Howard
- (France) Damien Inglis
- (France) Mouhammadou Jaiteh
- (France) Adrien Moerman
- (France) Jacques Monclar
- (France) Hugues Occansey
- (France) Stéphane Ostrowski
- (France) Johan Petro
- (France) Jonathan Rousselle
- (France) Thierry Rupert
- (France) Jean-Michel Sénégal
- (France) Steed Tchicamboud
- (France) Ali Traoré
- (France) Georges Vestris
- (France) Frédéric Weis
- (France) Léo Westermann
- (Bosnia and Herzegovina) Edin Bavčić
- (Bosnia and Herzegovina) Zack Wright
- (Brazil) João Paulo Batista
- (Brazil) Bruno Caboclo
- (Republic of the Congo) Dwight Hardy
- (England) John Amaechi
- (England) Spencer Dunkley
- (Finland) Ville Kaunisto
- (Georgia (country)) Taurean Green
- (Germany) Yassin Idbihi
- (Germany) Heiko Schaffartzik
- (Greece) Angelos Tsamis
- (Canada) Jermaine Bucknor
- (Ivory Coast) Pape-Philippe Amagou
- (Ivory Coast) Fréjus Zerbo
- (Jamaica) Samardo Samuels
- (Latvia) Siim-Sander Vene
- (North Macedonia) Bo McCalebb
- (Montenegro) J. R. Reynolds
- (Poland) Mathieu Wojciechowski
- (Slovenia) Klemen Prepelič
- (Slovenia) Jure Zdovc
- (Slovakia) Radoslav Rančík
- (Serbia) Mileta Lisica
- (Serbia) Dragan Lukovski
- (Serbia) Branko Milisavljević
- (Spain) Óscar Yebra
- (Ukraine) Eugene Jeter
- (Ukraine) Jerome Randle
- (United States) Alex Acker
- (United States) Tommy Adams
- (United States) Cedrick Banks
- (United States) Travarus Bennett
- (United States) Steffon Bradford
- (United States) Kevin Braswell
- (United States) Michael Brooks
- (United States) Anthony Brown
- (United States) Marcus Brown
- (United States) Don Collins
- (United States) Brian Conklin
- (United States) Randy Culpepper
- (United States) Ramel Curry
- (United States) Will Daniels
- (United States) Leon Douglas
- (United States) Grant Gondrezick
- (United States) R.T. Guinn
- (United States) Kenny Hayes
- (United States) Dru Joyce
- (United States) Clarence Kea
- (United States) Billy Knight
- (United States) J. R. Koch
- (United States) Kyle McAlarney
- (United States) Kevin McGee
- (United States) George Montgomery
- (United States) Glenn Mosley
- (United States) Ed Murphy
- (United States) Zamal Nixon
- (United States) Mark Payne
- (United States) London Perrantes
- (United States) Dawan Robinson
- (United States) Clinton Smith
- (United States) Jamar Smith
- (United States) Jordan Taylor
- (United States) Ronnie Taylor
- (United States) Carl Thomas
- (United States) Kelly Tripucka
- (United States) Joah Tucker
- (United States) Ty Walker
- (United States) Brad Wanamaker
- (United States) Harper Williams
- (United States) DaShaun Wood
- (United States) Michael Young

== Head coaches ==
- (France) André Buffière: (1980–83)
- (France) Pierre Dao: (1983–86)
- (France) Michel Gomez: (1986–90)
- (Federal Republic of Yugoslavia) Božidar Maljković: (1992–95)
- (Israel) Zvi Sherf: (1995–96)
- (Federal Republic of Yugoslavia) Bogdan Tanjević: (1996–97)
- (Federal Republic of Yugoslavia) Duško Ivanović: (1999–00)
- (Greece) Panagiotis Giannakis: (2012–13)
- (France) Jean-Marc Dupraz: (2013–2015)
- (France) Philippe Hervé: (2015–2016)
- (Serbia) Duško Vujošević: (2016–2017)
- (France) Kyle Milling: (2017–2018)
- (France) François Peronnet: (2018–2019)
- (Spain) Alfred Julbe: (2019)
- (France) Mehdy Mary: (2019–2021)
- (Italy) Massimo Cancellieri: (2021–2023)
- (Greece) Ilias Kantzouris: (2023–2024)
- (France) Jean-Marc Dupraz: (2024–2025)
- (Finland) Mikko Larkas: (2025)
- (Croatia) Dario Gjergja: (2025–2026)
