= 2016 Pro A Leaders Cup =

- Season: 2015–16
- Duration: 19–21 February 2016
- Games played: 7
- Teams: 8

Regular season
- Season MVP: (United States) Jamal Shuler

Finals
- Champions: Monaco (1st title)
- Runners-up: Élan Chalon

The 2016 LNB Pro A Leaders Cup season was the 20th edition of this tournament, the fourth since it was renamed as Leaders Cup. The event included the eight top teams from the first half of the 2015–16 LNB Pro A regular season and was played in Disneyland Paris. AS Monaco Basket, a newcomer in the Pro A, took the title and Jamal Shuler was named the tournament's MVP.

== Bracket ==
Quarterfinals
ASVEL	79
JDA Dijon	69
Le Mans	79
Élan Chalon	87
AS Monaco	70
JSF Nanterre	68
BCM Gravelines-Dunkerque	73
Strasbourg IG	83

Semifinals
ASVEL	70
Élan Chalon	91
AS Monaco	82
Strasbourg IG	65

Finals
Élan Chalon	74
AS Monaco	99

== Final ==
February 21, 2016	Élan Chalon	74–99	AS Monaco	Disneyland Paris, Paris
17:00 (UTC +1)	Scoring by quarter: 21-29, 48-52, 76-67, 99-74
	Pts: Roberson 19; Rebs: Booker 7 Asts: Roberson 7	Boxscore	Pts: Shuler 31; Rebs: 2 players 6 Asts: Cooper 7

Chalon	Monaco
