= SIG Strasbourg =

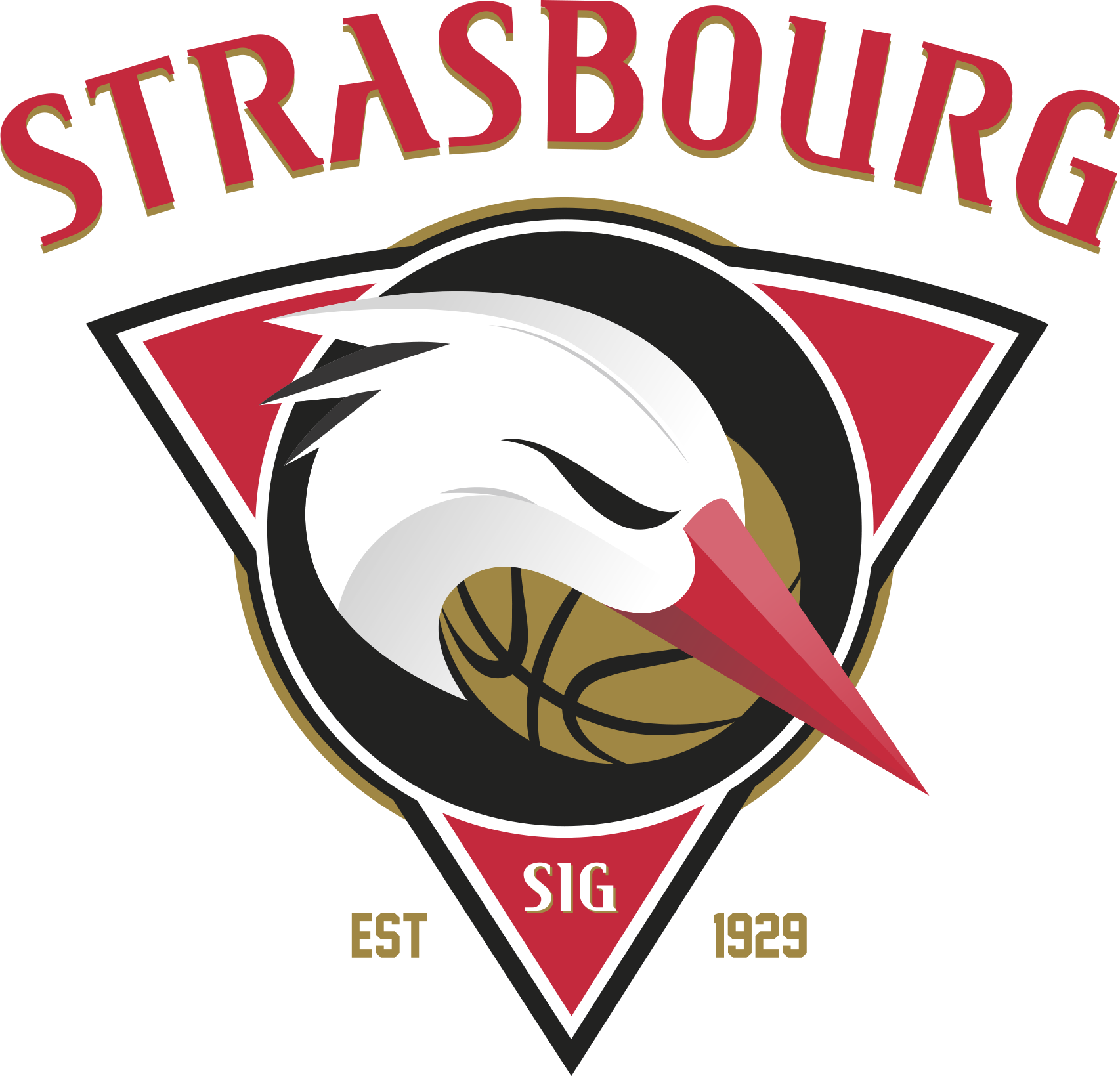
- Leagues: LNB Élite; Champions League
- Founded: 1929; 97 years ago
- Arena: Rhénus Sport
- Capacity: 6,200
- Location: Strasbourg, France
- Team colors: Red and White
- President: Jérôme Rosenstiehl
- Head coach: Jānis Gailītis
- Championships: 1 French Championship; 2 French Cup; 2 French League Cup; 1 Match des Champions; 1 French Second Division
- Website: sigstrasbourg.fr
Home	Away	Third

Strasbourg Illkirch-Graffenstaden Basket, commonly known as SIG Basket or SIG Strasbourg, is a French professional basketball club that is based in Strasbourg. The club was founded in 1929, and competes domestically in the French LNB Élite, the top division. Strasbourg team colors are red and white, and the club's home games are played at the Rhénus Sport Arena.

== History ==
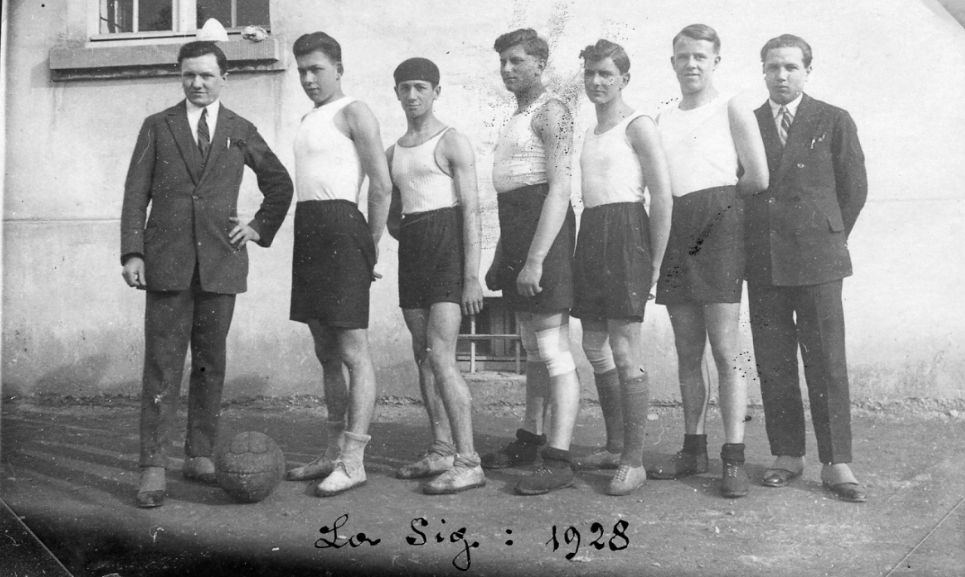
SIG Strasbourg team in 1928

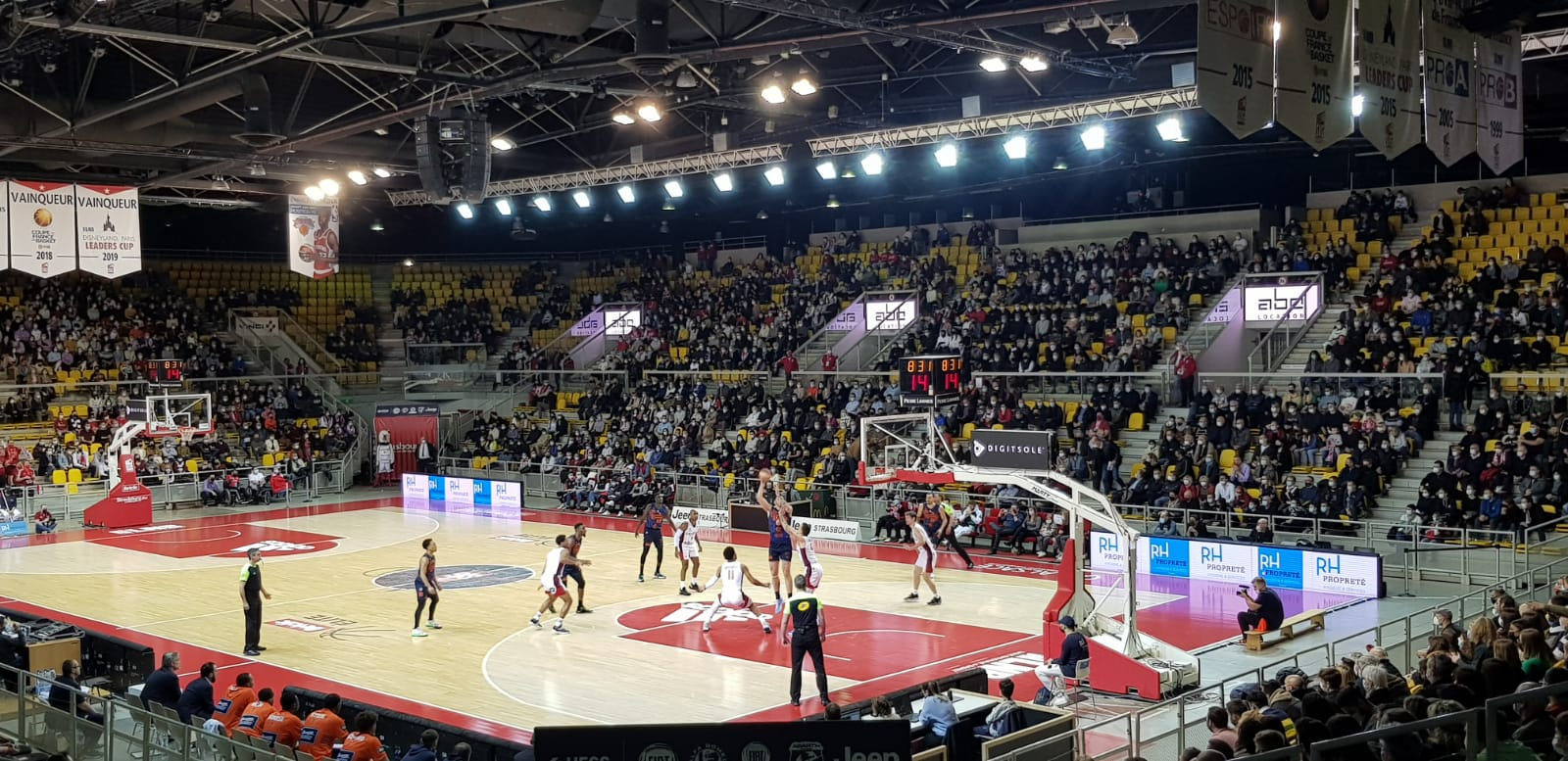
SIG Strasbourg home game against Gravelines in February 2022

The club was founded in 1929, and reached the top-tier of French basketball for the first time in 1938.

Starting from the 2004–05 season, new head coach Éric Girard took over the team. In the regular season, SIG finished 3rd and Giard was named Coach of the Year. Strasbourg won the top-tier French League for the first time in the 2004–05 season. SIG beat its rival SLUC Nancy 72–68.

In the 2005–06 season, Strasbourg played in the EuroLeague. The team had some outstanding results, as they beat top-tier team Saski Baskonia. In the Pro A, the team was defeated by Nancy 1–2 in the Semi-finals.

In the 2006–07 season, the team wouldn't reach further than the Quarter-finals. After some down years, the team started to revive when Vincent Collet took over as head coach in 2012. The team reached the Pro A Finals for three straight years in 2013, 2014, 2015. Along with that, the team won the 2015 Leaders Cup and 2014–15 French Basketball Cup. Important players for the team were Antoine Diot and Louis Campbell, who won MVP Awards in the won competitions.

In 2020, Vincent Collet left the team after he had served as head coach for almost a decade. For the 2020–21 Pro A season, the team started a recommencement as new head coach Lassi Tuovi recruited almost entirely new players. Strasbourg aims to regain success in both the national league as well as in the 2020–21 Basketball Champions League.

== Arenas ==
The 6,200 seat Rhénus Sport has been used as the home arena of SIG. In January 2017, the club announce plans for a new arena that would accommodate 10,000 people.

== Rivalries ==
=== The Eastern Rivalry ===
The Eastern Derby is the name of the matches that are played between Strasbourg IG and SLUC Nancy. The rivalry has a strong emotional history.

== Budgets ==
According to Ligue Nationale de Basket (LNB) guidelines, SIG has to publish its budget for each season.

Season	Budget
2012–13	€5,700,000
2013–14	€6,500,000 ▲
2014–15	€5,900,000 ▼
2015–16	€6,200,000 ▲
2016–17	€6,700,000 ▲
2017–18	€7,700,000 ▲
2018–19	€7,700,000
2019–20	€7,600,000 ▼
2020–21	€6,300,000 ▼
2021–22	€7,000,000 ▲
2022–23	€7,000,000
2023–24	€7,000,000
2024–25	€7,100,000 ▲

== Players ==
=== Current roster ===
Note: Flags indicate national team eligibility at FIBA-sanctioned events. Players may hold other non-FIBA nationalities not displayed.

SIG Strasbourg roster
Players
Coaches

Pos.	No.	Nat.	Name	Ht.	Wt.	Age
SF	1	(United States)	Chenery, Tymu	1.97 m (6 ft 6 in)	86 kg (190 lb)	26 – 15 September 2000
G	2	(France)	Lemoine, Maxence	1.91 m (6 ft 3 in)	84 kg (185 lb)	19 – 19 June 2007
PF	5	(France)	Pfister, William	2.05 m (6 ft 9 in)	104 kg (229 lb)	31 – 5 January 1995
G	6	(France)	Difuidi, Neftali	1.93 m (6 ft 4 in)	92 kg (203 lb)	25 – 3 November 2001
C	7	(France)	Omoruyi, Clifford	2.11 m (6 ft 11 in)	109 kg (240 lb)	25 – 11 October 2001
G	11	(France)	N'Doye, Abdoulaye	1.95 m (6 ft 5 in)	83 kg (183 lb)	30 – 9 March 1996
PF	12	(United States)	Gregg, Ben	2.08 m (6 ft 10 in)	102 kg (225 lb)	24 – 14 October 2002
F/C	16	(France)	Cingala-Mata, Bruno	2.05 m (6 ft 9 in)	110 kg (243 lb)	33 – 19 March 1993
SF	22	(United States)	McKoy, Justin	2.02 m (6 ft 8 in)	98 kg (216 lb)	25 – 7 January 2001
G	50	(United States)	Hands, Jaylen	1.91 m (6 ft 3 in)	86 kg (190 lb)	27 – 12 February 1999
F	64	(Republic of Ireland)	Alajiki, Samuel	2.01 m (6 ft 7 in)	104 kg (229 lb)	24 – 12 November 2002

Head coach

- (Latvia) Jānis Gailītis

Assistant coach(es)

- (Italy) Massimo Maffezzoli
- (France) Maxime Bureau

Legend

- (C) Team captain
- Injured

- Roster
Updated: November 19, 2026

=== Depth chart ===
Pos.	Starting 5	Bench
C	Ben Gregg	Bruno Cingala-Mata
PF	Samuel Alajiki	William Pfister
SF	Justin McKoy	Tymu Chenery
SG	Abdoulaye N'Doye	Neftali Difuidi
PG	Jaylen Hands	Maxence Lemoine

== Season by season ==
Season	Tier	League	Pos.	French Cup	Leaders Cup	European competitions	
2006–07	1	Pro A	5th	Round of 16	Quarterfinalist		
2007–08	1	Pro A	12th	Round of 16			
2008–09	1	Pro A	8th	Semifinalist	Quarterfinalist		
2009–10	1	Pro A	14th	Round of 16		3 EuroChallenge	RS
2010–11	1	Pro A	11th	Round of 32			
2011–12	1	Pro A	10th		Round of 16		
2012–13	1	Pro A	2nd	Quarterfinalist	Runner-up		
2013–14	1	Pro A	2nd	Round of 32	Semifinalist	1 Euroleague	RS
2013–14	1	Pro A	2nd	Round of 32	Semifinalist	2 Eurocup	L32
2014–15	1	Pro A	2nd	Champion	Champion	2 Eurocup	L32
2015–16	1	Pro A	2nd	Round of 32	Semifinalist	1 Euroleague	RS
2015–16	1	Pro A	2nd	Round of 32	Semifinalist	2 Eurocup	RU
2016–17	1	Pro A	2nd	Round of 32	Quarterfinalist	3 Champions League	POQ
2017–18	1	Pro A	3rd	Champion	Quarterfinalist	3 Champions League	QF
2018–19	1	Pro A	6th	Round of 16	Champion	3 Champions League	RS
2019–20 (Note: The 2019–20 season was canceleld prematurely because of the COVID-19 pandemic.)	1	Pro A	10th		Quarterfinalist	3 Champions League	RS
2020–21	1	Pro A	3rd	Quarterfinalist		3 Champions League	4th
2021–22	1	Pro A	7th	Runner-up		3 Champions League	QF
2022–23	1	Pro A	8th	Semifinalist		2 Champions League	QF
2023–24	1	Pro A	12th	Runner-up		2 Champions League	R16
2024–25	1	Pro A	12th	Round of 32	Quarterfinalist		

== Honours ==
- French League

Winners (1): 2004–05

- French Cup

Winners (2): 2014–15, 2017–18
Runners-up (2): 1998–99, 2021–22, 2023–24

- Leaders Cup

Winners (2): 2015, 2019
Runners-up (1): 2013

- Match des Champions

Winners (1): 2015

- French Second Division

Winners (1): 1998–99

- Brussels, Belgium Invitational Game

Winners (1): 2015

- Luxeuil-les-Bains, France Invitational Game

Winners (1): 2015

- Besançon, France Invitational Game

Winners (1): 2015

== Notable players ==
Note: Flags indicate national team eligibility at FIBA-sanctioned events. Players may hold other non-FIBA nationalities not displayed.

Criteria

To appear in this section a player must have either:

- Set a club record or won an individual award while at the club
- Played at least one official international match for their national team at any time
- Played at least one official NBA match at any time.

- (France) Alexis Ajinça
- (France) Rodrigue Beaubois
- (France) Léopold Cavalière
- (France) Malcolm Cazalon
- (France) Boris Dallo
- (France) Alain Digbeu
- (France) Antoine Diot
- (France) Youssoupha Fall
- (France) Mickaël Gelabale
- (France) Bruno Hamm
- (France) Thomas Heurtel
- (France) Damien Inglis
- (France) Mouhammadou Jaiteh
- (France) Aymeric Jeanneau
- (France) Louis Labeyrie
- (France) Nicolas Lang
- (France) Paul Lacombe
- (France) Jérémy Leloup
- (France) Abdoulaye M'Baye
- (France) Amine Noua
- (France) Frank Ntilikina
- (France) Crawford Palmer
- (France) Florent Piétrus
- (France) Axel Toupane
- (France) Ali Traoré
- (Australia) David Andersen
- (Belarus) Artsiom Parakhouski
- (Belgium) Quentin Serron
- (Bosnia and Herzegovina) Zack Wright
- (Bulgaria) Dee Bost
- (Canada) Thomas Scrubb
- (Cameroon) Jérémy Nzeulie
- (Croatia) Miro Bilan
- (Dominican Republic) Jeff Greer
- (Dominican Republic) Ricardo Greer
- (Finland) Edon Maxhuni
- (Finland) Erik Murphy
- (Finland) Luukas Vaara
- (Georgia (country)) Michael Dixon
- (Hungary) Kornél Dávid
- (Israel) Afik Nissim
- (Italy) Anthony Dobbins
- (South Korea) Moon Tae-jong
- (Lithuania) Mindaugas Timinskas
- (North Macedonia) Romeo Travis
- (Netherlands) Nicolas de Jong
- (Poland) David Logan
- (Poland) A. J. Slaughter
- (Senegal) Youssoupha Fall
- (Serbia) Tadija Dragićević
- (Serbia) Vladimir Golubović
- (Uganda) / (United States) Ish Wainright
- (United States) Tim Abromaitis
- (United States) Michael Brooks
- (United States) Louis Campbell
- (United States) Mardy Collins
- (United States) Bonzie Colson
- (United States) Tremmell Darden
- (United States) Jarell Eddie
- (United States) Chuck Eidson
- (United States) Malik Fitts
- (United States) Mike Green
- (United States) Matt Howard
- (United States) Rick Hughes
- (United States) Keith Jennings
- (United States) Matt Mitchell
- (United States) J. R. Reid
- (United States) Scottie Reynolds
- (United States) Anthony Roberson
- (United States) Brion Rush
- (United States) John Shurna
- (United States) Terence Stansbury
- (United States) Bootsy Thornton
- (United States) Erving Walker
- (United States) Kyle Weems
- (United States) K'zell Wesson
- (United States) Gabe York

== Head coaches ==
Nat.	Coach	Tenure
(France)	Vincent Collet	2011–2016
(Finland)	Henrik Dettmann	2016
(France)	Vincent Collet	2016–2020
(Finland)	Lassi Tuovi	2020–2022
(Italy)	Luca Banchi	2022–2023
(Italy)	Massimo Cancellieri	2023–2024
(France)	Laurent Vila	2024–2025
(Latvia)	Jānis Gailītis	2025–present
