= 2022–23 Pro A season =

Professional basketball season in France

2022–23 Pro A
- Season: 2022–23
- Dates: 23 September 2022 – 16 May 2023 (regular season)
- Teams: 18
- TV partner: BeIN Sports

Regular season
- Top seed: Monaco
- Season MVP: Victor Wembanyama (Metropolitans 92)
- Relegated: ÉB Pau-Lacq-Orthez; Fos Provence Basket

Finals
- Champions: Monaco (1st title)
- Runners-up: Metropolitans 92
- Semi-finalists: ASVEL; JL Bourg
- Playoffs MVP: Jordan Loyd (Monaco)

The 2022–23 Pro A season, known as Betclic Élite due to sponsorship from online gambling company Betclic, was the 101st season of the Pro A, the top basketball league in France organised by the Ligue Nationale de Basket (LNB). The regular season began on 23 September 2022 and ended on 16 May 2023. Via promotion and relegation with LNB Pro B, SLUC Nancy Basket and ADA Blois Basket 41 joined the league, replacing Orléans Loiret and Champagne Châlons Reims.

== Teams ==
Location of teams in the 2019–20 Pro A season

=== Locations and arenas ===
Team	Home city	Stadium	Capacity
AS Monaco	Fontvieille, Monaco	Salle Gaston Médecin	5,000
ASVEL	Lyon–Villeurbanne	Astroballe	5,556
BCM Gravelines-Dunkerque	Gravelines	Sportica	3,500
Blois	Blois	Jeu de Paume	2,525
Cholet	Cholet	La Meilleraie	5,191
Élan Béarnais Pau-Lacq-Orthez	Pau	Palais des Sports de Pau	7,707
Fos	Fos-sur-Mer	Complexe sportif Parsemain	2,000
ESSM Le Portel	Le Portel	Le Chaudron	3,500
JDA Dijon	Dijon	Palais des Sports de Dijon	5,000
JL Bourg	Bourg-en-Bresse	Ekinox	3,548
Le Mans Sarthe	Le Mans	Antarès	6,003
Limoges CSP	Limoges	Beaublanc	6,000
Metropolitans 92	Levallois	Palais des Sports Marcel Cerdan	4,000
Nanterre 92	Nanterre	Palais des Sports de Nanterre	3,000
Paris Basketball	Paris	Halle Georges Carpentier	5,000
Roanne	Roanne	Halle André Vacheresse	5,000
SIG Strasbourg	Strasbourg	Rhénus Sport	6,200
SLUC Nancy	Nancy	Palais des Sports Jean Weille	6,027

== Regular season ==
=== League table ===
Pos	Team	Pld	W	L	PF	PA	PD	Qualification or relegation
1	Monaco	34	26	8	3035	2755	+280	Advance to playoffs
2	Metropolitans 92	34	23	11	2920	2812	+108	Advance to playoffs
3	LDLC ASVEL	34	23	11	2926	2627	+299	Advance to playoffs
4	JDA Dijon	34	21	13	2943	2861	+82	Advance to playoffs
5	JL Bourg	34	19	15	2914	2866	+48	Advance to playoffs
6	Le Mans Sarthe	34	19	15	3005	2855	+150	Advance to playoffs
7	Cholet	34	18	16	2790	2807	−17	Advance to playoffs
8	SIG Strasbourg	34	17	17	2796	2789	+7	Advance to playoffs
9	Paris Basketball	34	16	18	2984	3059	−75	
10	BCM Gravelines	34	16	18	2695	2757	−62	
11	Roanne	34	15	19	3111	3097	+14	
12	ESSM Le Portel	34	15	19	2705	2704	+1	
13	Nanterre 92	34	14	20	2709	2839	−130	
14	Nancy	34	14	20	2789	2856	−67	
15	Limoges CSP	34	14	20	2656	2787	−131	
16	Blois	34	14	20	2805	2952	−147	
17	ÉB Pau-Lacq-Orthez	34	12	22	2673	2820	−147	Relegation to Pro B
18	Fos Provence Basket	34	10	24	2594	2807	−213	Relegation to Pro B

Source: LNB.fr
Rules for classification: 1) points; 2) Head-to-head; 3) Points difference; 4) Points scored.

== Playoffs ==
The quarter-finals were played in a best-of-three format, while the semi-finals and finals were played in a best-of-five format.

Quarterfinals
1	Monaco	2
8	SIG Strasbourg	0
4	JDA Dijon	0
5	JL Bourg	2
2	Metropolitans 92	2
7	Cholet	1
3	LDLC ASVEL	2
6	Le Mans Sarthe	0

Semifinals
1	Monaco	3
5	JL Bourg	0
2	Metropolitans 92	3
3	LDLC ASVEL	1

Finals
1	Monaco	3
2	Metropolitans 92	0

== Awards ==
- Season MVP: Victor Wembanyama (Metropolitans 92)
- Finals MVP: Jordan Loyd (Monaco)
- Best Young Player: Victor Wembanyama (Metropolitans 92)
- Best Defender: Victor Wembanyama (Metropolitans 92)
- Best Scorer: Victor Wembanyama (Metropolitans 92)
- Best Blocker: Victor Wembanyama (Metropolitans 92)
- Best Coach: Laurent Vila (Cholet)
- All-LNB Pro A Teams:

Pos.	First Team		Second Team	
Pos.	Player	Team	Player	Team
G	(United States) Matt Morgan	Le Mans Sarthe	(United States) Mike James	Monaco
G	(France) Nando de Colo	LDLC ASVEL	(France) Élie Okobo	Monaco
F	(United States) Ronald March	Chorale Roanne	(Guinea) Alpha Diallo	Monaco
F	(France) Victor Wembanyama	Metropolitans 92	(United States) Markis McDuffie	Dijon
C	(Zimbabwe) Vitalis Chikoko	Élan Béarnais	(Lithuania) Donatas Motiejūnas	Monaco

== French clubs in European competitions ==
Team	Competition	Progress
Monaco	EuroLeague	Regular Season
LDLC ASVEL	EuroLeague	Regular Season
JL Bourg	EuroCup	Regular Season
Paris Basketball	EuroCup	Regular Season
JDA Dijon	Champions League	Round of 16
Limoges CSP	Champions League	Round of 16
SIG Strasbourg	Champions League	Quarterfinals
Cholet	FIBA Europe Cup	Semifinals
