= JL Bourg Basket =

French basketball team

JL Bourg
- Nickname: La Jeu; La JL
- Leagues: LNB Élite; EuroCup
- Founded: 1910; 116 years ago
- Arena: Ekinox
- Capacity: 3,548
- Location: Bourg-en-Bresse, France
- Team colors: Red, white
- President: Julien Desbottes
- Head coach: Frédéric Fauthoux
- Team captain: Lionel Gaudoux
- Championships: 1 EuroCup
- Website: jlbourg-basket.com
Home	Away

Jeunesse Laïque de Bourg-en-Bresse, commonly known as JL Bourg or simply Bourg, is a basketball club based in Bourg-en-Bresse, France that plays in the LNB Élite, the national top division. Their home arena is Ekinox, which has a capacity of 3,548 people.

Bourg has also represented France in European competition, including the second level EuroCup.

== History ==
The club was officially founded in 1910 by Henri Mamet, who also became the first president of JL Bourg. In 1956, the team won its first title when it won the Ain regional championship.

The team joined professional competition in 1996 when it entered the LNB Pro B, the national second division.

In 2014, JL Bourg adopted its new home arena, Ekinox, with a capacity of 3,500 spectators. This replaced the Salle des Sports which had a capacity of 2,300. In the same year, the team also promoted to the Pro A after it won the Pro B Playoffs. They relegated back after the 2014–15 season.

In the 2019–20 season, Bourg was in the 5th place until the season was cancelled due to the COVID-19 pandemic. In the 2020–21 season, Bourg will make its European debut when it will play in the EuroCup.

During the 2023–24 season, Bourg had the first pick of the 2024 NBA draft Zaccharie Risacher on its roster which was on a loaned from LDLC ASVEL. In the EuroCup, Bourg had its most successful European season in club history after reaching the finals following a 2–1 semifinal win over Beşiktaş. But however, they lost to Paris Basketball in the 2024 EuroCup Finals.

Bourg returned later in this season’s EuroCup finals, and Bourg eventually win the first EuroCup title and their club’s first championship in European competition after they beat Beşiktaş 2–0 in the finals, but they refuse to promote to the following season’s EuroLeague due to financial problems.

== Honours ==
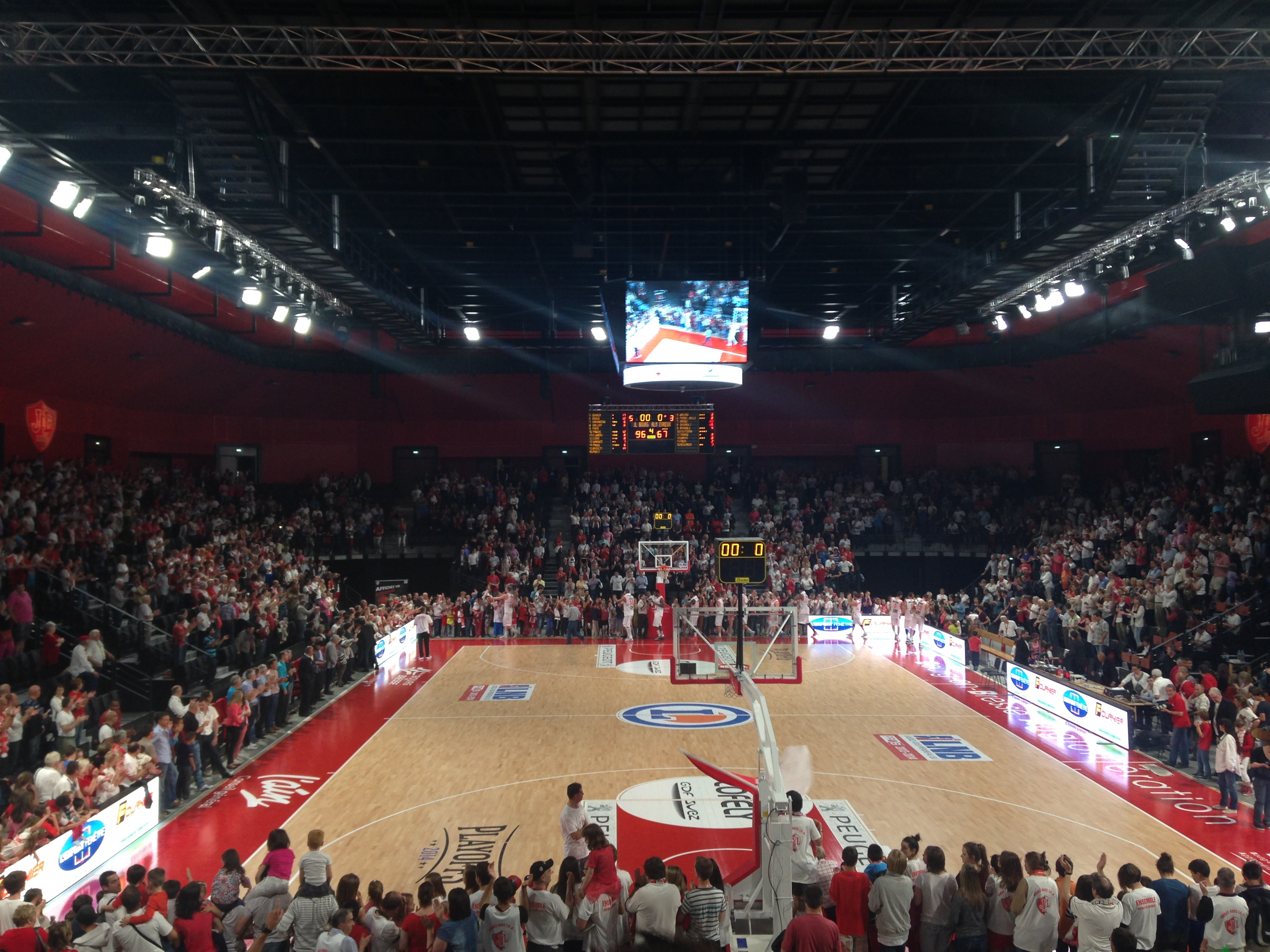
JL Bourg playing a home game at the Ekinox

=== Domestic competitions ===
- LNB Pro A Leaders Cup

Runners-up (3): 2006, 2019, 2023

- Pro B

Winners (1) 2016–17

- Pro B Leaders Cup

Winners (1) 2016

=== European competitions ===
- EuroCup

Winners (1): 2026
Runners-up (1): 2024

== Season by season ==
Season	Tier	League	Pos.	Record	French Cup	Other competitions		European competitions	
2011–12	2	Pro B	9th						
2012–13	2	Pro B	8th						
2013–14	2	Pro B	2nd						
2014–15	1	Pro A	18th						
2015–16	2	Pro B	5th			Pro B Leaders Cup	C		
2016–17	2	Pro B	1st			Pro B Leaders Cup	SF		
2017–18	1	Pro A	9th	17–17	Eightfinalist				
2018–19	1	Pro A	9th	19–15	Round of 32				
2019–20 (Note: The 2019–20 season was cancelled prematurely because of the COVID-19 pandemic. Bourg played only 25 games and had a 16–9 record.)	1	Pro A	5th	16–9	Eightfinalist				
2020–21	1	Pro A	5th	22–12				2 EuroCup	R16
2021–22	1	Pro A	11th	15–19	Quarterfinalist			2 EuroCup	RS
2022–23	1	Pro A	4th	19–15	Quarterfinalist	Pro A Leaders Cup	RU	2 EuroCup	EF
2023–24	1	Pro A	4th	25–9	Eightfinalist	Pro A Leaders Cup	SF	2 EuroCup	RU
2024–25	1	Pro A	4th	20–15	Semifinalist	Pro A Leaders Cup	QF	2 EuroCup	RS

== Players ==
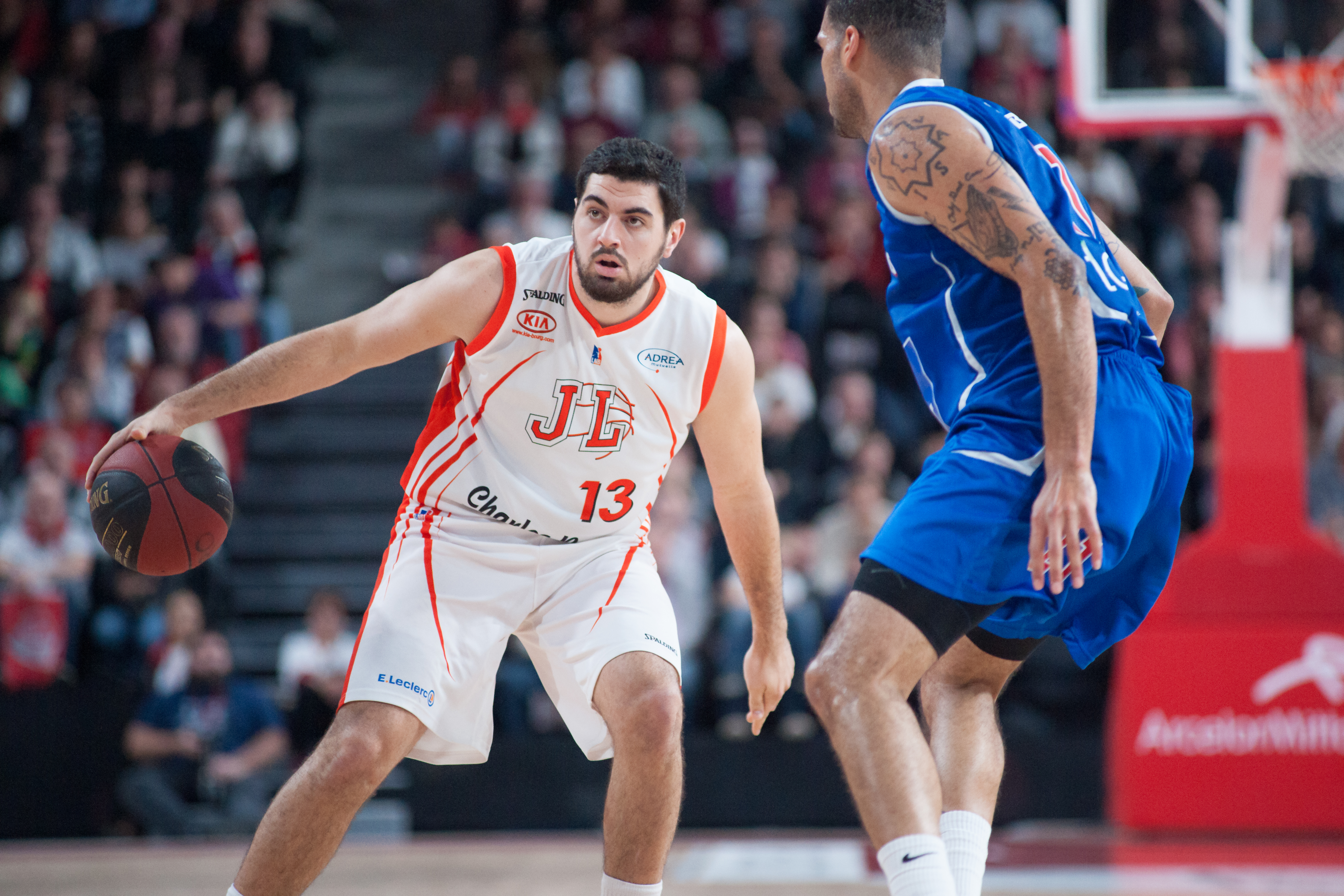
Jérome Sanchez wearing the Bourg jersey in 2014

=== Current roster ===
Note: Flags indicate national team eligibility at FIBA-sanctioned events. Players may hold other non-FIBA nationalities not displayed.

JL Bourg roster
Players
Coaches

Pos.	No.	Nat.	Name	Ht.	Age
F/C	0	(Senegal)	Ba, Oumar	2.05 m (6 ft 9 in)	19 – 12 November 2006
SF	2	(United States)	Jordan, Keith	1.98 m (6 ft 6 in)	28 – 25 March 1998
G	3	(Ivory Coast) (France)	Moularé, Assémian	1.83 m (6 ft 0 in)	23 – 23 January 2003
F	4	(United States)	Nelson, Adrian	2.02 m (6 ft 8 in)	27 – 5 October 1999
PF	5	(Canada)	Samuel, Tyrese	2.06 m (6 ft 9 in)	26 – 10 March 2000
SG	8	(France)	Labanca, Antony (injured)	1.92 m (6 ft 4 in)	32 – 30 July 1994
SG	9	(Canada)	Berhanemeskel, Johnny	1.88 m (6 ft 2 in)	34 – 30 October 1992
PG	10	(United States)	Campbell, Tyger	1.80 m (5 ft 11 in)	26 – 9 January 2000
PG	12	(United States)	Walker, Tyson	1.85 m (6 ft 1 in)	26 – 18 September 2000
PF	13	(France)	Gaudoux, Lionel (C)	1.98 m (6 ft 6 in)	31 – 30 May 1995
F	14	(France)	Soliman, Nathan	2.01 m (6 ft 7 in)	17 – 15 June 2009
C	21	(United States)	Shedrick, Kadin	2.10 m (6 ft 11 in)	25 – 27 July 2001
G	22	(United States)	Woodbury, Trey	1.93 m (6 ft 4 in)	27 – 17 September 1999
PG	23	(France)	Selebangue, Morgan	1.77 m (5 ft 10 in)	19 – 17 October 2007
SG	55	(France)	Monnet, Leni	1.95 m (6 ft 5 in)	20 – 23 June 2006
SG	87	(France)	Robineau, Hugo	1.93 m (6 ft 4 in)	26 – 27 February 2000

Head coach

- (France) Frédéric Fauthoux

Assistant coach(es)

- (Lithuania) Marius Leonavičius
- (France) Jonathan Nebout
- (Dominican Republic) Sammy Mejía

Legend

- (C) Team captain
- Injured

- Roster
Updated: October 14, 2026

=== Depth chart ===
Pos.	Starting 5	Bench 1	Bench 2	Inactive
C	Kadin Shedrick	Adrian Nelson	Oumar Ba
PF	Tyrese Samuel	Lionel Gaudoux	Leni Monnet
SF	Keith Jordan	Nathan Soliman	Hugo Robineau
SG	Trey Woodbury	Assémian Moularé	Johnny Berhanemeskel	Antony Labanca (injured)
PG	Tyson Walker	Tyger Campbell	Morgan Selebangue

=== Notable players ===
Note: Flags indicate national team eligibility at FIBA-sanctioned events. Players may hold other non-FIBA nationalities not displayed.

Criteria

To appear in this section a player must have either:

- Set a club record or won an individual award while at the club
- Played at least one official international match for their national team at any time
- Played at least one official NBA match at any time.

- (France) Antoine Gomis
- (France) Marc-Antoine Pellin
- (France) Zaccharie Risacher
- (France) Jérôme Sanchez
- (France) (Israel) Arthur Rozenfeld
- (Czech Republic) Tomáš Kyzlink
- (Poland) Mathieu Wojciechowski
- (Senegal) Youssou Ndoye
- (United States) Kadeem Allen
- (United States) Devin Booker
- (United States) Rob Gray
- (United States) Chris Johnson
- (United States) Jalen Jones
- (United States) Trey Lewis
- (United States) Garrett Sim
- (United States) Chase Simon
- (United States) Steven Smith
- (United States) Jordan Theodore
- (United States) LaMonte Ulmer
- (United States) (Haiti) Frantz Massenat

== Individual awards ==
- Pro A Most Valuable Player
  - Zachery Peacock – 2018
