= Doğa (disambiguation) =

Doğa is a Turkish environmental non-governmental organization.

Doğa may also refer to:

- Doğa (name), a Turkish given name
- Doğa, Bandırma, a neighbourhood in Balıkesir Province, Turkey
- Doğa International Schools, an educational institution in Northern Cyprus
- Doğa Schools, a private school chain in Turkey
