= Çepni =

Çepni can refer to:

- Chepni (tribe), one of the Oghuz tribes
- Çepni, Bandırma, a village in Balıkesir Province, Turkey
- Çepni, Mudanya, a village in Bursa Province, Turkey
- Çepni, Tosya, a village in Kastamonu Province, Turkey
