= Erikli =

Erikli (literally "with plums") is a Turkic place name that may refer to:

- Ərikli, a village in the Lachin Rayon, Azerbaijan
- Erikli, Bandırma, a village
- Erikli, Bozüyük, a village in the district of Bozüyük, Bilecik Province
- Erikli, Burdur
- Erikli, Kahta, a village in the district of Kahta, Adıyaman Province
- Erikli, Keşan
- Erikli, Sason, a village in the district of Sason, Batman Province
- Erikli, Şavşat, a village in the district of Şavşat, Artvin Province
- Erikli Raid, a raid made by Turkish forces on the Greeks during the Greco-Turkish War
