= List of 2024–25 EuroLeague transactions =

This is a list of all personnel changes for the 2024 EuroLeague off-season and 2024–25 EuroLeague season.

== Retirements ==
Date	Name	EuroLeague Team(s) and played (years)	Age	Notes	Ref.
June 19	(Spain) Sergio Rodríguez	(Spain) Estudiantes (2004–2005); (Spain) Real Madrid (2010–2016) (2022–2024); (Russia) CSKA Moscow (2017–2019); (Italy) Olimpia Milano (2019–2022)	38	3× EuroLeague champion (2015, 2019, 2023); EuroLeague MVP (2014); All-EuroLeague First Team (2014); All-EuroLeague Second Team (2018)	
July 1	(Spain) Víctor Claver	(Spain) Valencia (2010–2011) (2022–2024); (Russia) Lokomotiv (2015–2016); (Spain) Barcelona (2016–2021)	35		
July 2	(United States) Kemba Walker	(France) Monaco (2023–2024)	34		
July 11	(United States) Will Thomas	(Spain) Unicaja (2014–2016) (2017–2018); (Spain) Valencia (2017–2018); (Russia) Zenit (2019–2021); (France) Monaco (2021–2022)	38		
July 12	(Spain) Carlos Suárez	(Spain) Estudiantes (2004–2005); (Spain) Real Madrid (2010–2013); (Spain) Unicaja (2013–2016) (2017–2018)	38		
August 7	(United States) Kyle Guy	(Greece) Panathinaikos (2023–2024)	26		
August 16	(Spain) Rudy Fernández	(Spain) Joventut (2006–2007); (Spain) Real Madrid (2012–2024)	39	3× EuroLeague champion (2015, 2018, 2023); 2× All-EuroLeague First Team (2013, 2014); All-EuroLeague Second Team (2015); EuroLeague Rising Star (2007)	
September 4	(United States) Kyle Hines	(Germany) Bamberg (2010–2011); (Greece) Olympiacos (2011–2013); (Russia) CSKA Moscow (2013–2020); (Italy) Olimpia Milano (2020–2024)	38	4× EuroLeague champion (2012, 2013, 2016, 2019); EuroLeague 2010–20 All-Decade Team (2020); 3× EuroLeague Best Defender (2016, 2018, 2022); EuroLeague all-time leader in games played	
September 26	(United States) Greg Monroe	(Germany) Bayern Munich (2019–2020); (Russia) Khimki (2020–2021)	34		
October 10	(United States) Danny Green	(Slovenia) Olimpija (2011–2012)	37		
October 12	(United States) Billy Baron	(Serbia) Crvena zvezda (2018–2020); (Russia) Zenit (2020–2022); (Italy) Olimpia Milano (2022–2024)	33		
October 17	(Australia) Aron Baynes	(Lithuania) Rytas (2009–2010); (Slovenia) Olimpija (2012–2013)	37		
December 13	(Slovenia) Anthony Randolph	(Russia) Lokomotiv (2015–2016); (Spain) Real Madrid (2016–2023)	35	2x EuroLeague champion (2018, 2023); All-EuroLeague Second Team (2016)	
December 23	(United States) Diante Garrett	(Croatia) Zagreb (2011–2012)	36		
January 10	(United States) Orlando Johnson	(Spain) Baskonia (2014–2015); (Russia) UNICS Kazan (2016–2017)	35		
February 5	(Turkey) Semih Erden	(Serbia) Partizan (2004–2005); (Turkey) Fenerbahçe (2005–2010) (2014–2015); (Turkey) Anadolu Efes (2012–2014); (Turkey) Darüşşafaka (2015–2017)	38		
February 25	(Spain) Quino Colom	(Russia) UNICS Kazan (2016–2017); (Spain) Valencia (2019–2020); (Serbia) Crvena Zvezda (2020–2021)	36		

== Managerial changes ==
=== Managerial changes ===
Team	Outgoing manager	Manner of departure	Date of vacancy	Position in table	Replaced with	Date of appointment
(Spain) Baskonia	(Montenegro) Duško Ivanović	End of contract	27 May 2024	Pre-season	(Spain) Pablo Laso	28 June 2024
(Spain) Barcelona	(Spain) Roger Grimau	Sacked	8 June 2024	Pre-season	(Spain) Joan Peñarroya	14 June 2024
(Germany) Bayern Munich	(Spain) Pablo Laso	Resigned	28 June 2024	Pre-season	(Canada) Gordon Herbert	25 July 2024
(France) Paris Basketball	(Finland) Tuomas Iisalo	Resigned	8 July 2024	Pre-season	(Brazil) Tiago Splitter	15 July 2024
(France) Monaco	(Serbia) Saša Obradović	Sacked	18 November 2024	7th (6-4)	(Greece) Vassilis Spanoulis	26 November 2024
(Italy) Virtus Bologna	(Italy) Luca Banchi	Resigned	5 December 2024	18th (2-11)	(Montenegro) Duško Ivanović	5 December 2024
(Turkey) Anadolu Efes	(Croatia) Tomislav Mijatović	Resigned	7 January 2025	10th (10-9)	(Italy) Luca Banchi	7 January 2025
(Germany) ALBA Berlin	(Spain) Israel González	Sacked	12 March 2025	18th (4-24)	(Spain) Pedro Calles	12 March 2025

== Player movements ==
=== Between two EuroLeague teams ===
Date	Player	From	To	Contract years	Ref.
Off-season
June 12	(France) Timothé Luwawu-Cabarrot	(France) ASVEL	(Spain) Baskonia	2	
June 15	(Latvia) Rolands Šmits	(Lithuania) Žalgiris	(Turkey) Anadolu Efes	2	
June 17	(Serbia) Vanja Marinković	(Spain) Baskonia	(Serbia) Partizan	2	
June 17	(United States) Devon Hall	(Italy) Olimpia Milano	(Turkey) Fenerbahçe	2	
June 17	(Greece) Nick Calathes	(Turkey) Fenerbahçe	(France) Monaco	2	
June 19	(United States) Kevin Punter	(Serbia) Partizan	(Spain) Barcelona	1	
June 19	(United States) Isaiah Canaan	(Greece) Olympiacos	(Serbia) Crvena zvezda	2	
June 20	(Denmark) Gabriel Lundberg	(Italy) Virtus Bologna	(Serbia) Partizan	2	
June 21	(Serbia) Nikola Kalinić	(Spain) Barcelona	(Serbia) Crvena zvezda	3	
June 24	(Slovenia) Josh Nebo	(Israel) Maccabi Tel Aviv	(Italy) Olimpia Milano	2	
June 25	(Azerbaijan) Zach LeDay	(Serbia) Partizan	(Italy) Olimpia Milano	2	
June 25	(Italy) Nicolò Melli	(Italy) Olimpia Milano	(Turkey) Fenerbahçe	2	
June 25	(France) Vincent Poirier	(Spain) Real Madrid	(Turkey) Anadolu Efes	3	
June 25	(Spain) Lorenzo Brown	(Israel) Maccabi Tel Aviv	(Greece) Panathinaikos	3	
June 26	(United States) Mike Daum	(Turkey) Anadolu Efes	(Serbia) Crvena zvezda	1	
June 28	(Serbia) Alen Smailagić	(Serbia) Partizan	(Lithuania) Žalgiris	1+1	
June 28	(United States) Bonzie Colson	(Israel) Maccabi Tel Aviv	(Turkey) Fenerbahçe	2+1	
July 1	(Greece) Tyler Dorsey	(Turkey) Fenerbahçe	(Greece) Olympiacos	3	
July 1	(Turkey) Erten Gazi	(Turkey) Anadolu Efes	(Turkey) Fenerbahçe	1	
July 1	(France) Sylvain Francisco	(Germany) Bayern Munich	(Lithuania) Žalgiris	1+1	
July 2	(Argentina) Luca Vildoza	(Greece) Panathinaikos	(Greece) Olympiacos	2	
July 3	(Bulgaria) Codi Miller-McIntyre	(Spain) Baskonia	(Serbia) Crvena zvezda	2	
July 4	(Germany) Oscar da Silva	(Spain) Barcelona	(Germany) Bayern Munich	3	
July 6	(United States) Keenan Evans	(Lithuania) Žalgiris	(Greece) Olympiacos	3	
July 8	(Argentina) Leandro Bolmaro	(Germany) Bayern Munich	(Italy) Olimpia Milano	2	
July 9	(Greece) Georgios Papagiannis	(Turkey) Fenerbahçe	(France) Monaco	1	
July 10	(United States) Wade Baldwin	(Israel) Maccabi Tel Aviv	(Turkey) Fenerbahçe	1+1	
July 14	(United States) Jordan Loyd	(France) Monaco	(Israel) Maccabi Tel Aviv	2	
July 16	(Israel) Yam Madar	(Turkey) Fenerbahçe	(Germany) Bayern Munich	2	
July 17	(Armenia) Bryant Dunston	(Italy) Virtus Bologna	(Lithuania) Žalgiris	1	
July 20	(United States) Will Clyburn	(Turkey) Anadolu Efes	(Italy) Virtus Bologna	1+1	
July 21	(Serbia) Ognjen Dobrić	(Italy) Virtus Bologna	(Serbia) Crvena zvezda	3	
July 23	(Central African Republic) Kevarrius Hayes	(Lithuania) Žalgiris	(France) Paris	1	
July 23	(Azerbaijan) Donta Hall	(France) Monaco	(Spain) Baskonia	2	
July 24	(Lithuania) Ignas Brazdeikis	(Greece) Olympiacos	(Lithuania) Žalgiris	2	
July 24	(Lithuania) Rokas Jokubaitis	(Spain) Barcelona	(Israel) Maccabi Tel Aviv	3	
July 24	(France) Fabien Causeur	(Spain) Real Madrid	(Italy) Olimpia Milano	1	
July 26	(Spain) Serge Ibaka	(Germany) Bayern Munich	(Spain) Real Madrid	1	
July 31	(Senegal) Youssoupha Fall	(France) ASVEL	(Spain) Barcelona	1	
August 8	(France) Yakuba Ouattara	(France) Monaco	(France) Paris	1	
August 14	(Germany) Johannes Voigtmann	(Italy) Olimpia Milano	(Germany) Bayern Munich	3	
August 16	(Germany) Maodo Lô	(Italy) Olimpia Milano	(France) Paris	1	
August 19	(Germany) Isaac Bonga	(Germany) Bayern Munich	(Serbia) Partizan	2	
August 19	(United States) Tyrique Jones	(Turkey) Anadolu Efes	(Serbia) Partizan	2	
August 19	(United States) Sterling Brown	(Germany) ALBA Berlin	(Serbia) Partizan	2	
August 27	(Serbia) Ognjen Jaramaz	(Serbia) Partizan	(Spain) Baskonia	1	
September 4	(Puerto Rico) Shabazz Napier	(Italy) Olimpia Milano	(Germany) Bayern Munich	1	
In-season
October 12	(United States) Jordan Loyd	(Israel) Maccabi Tel Aviv	(France) Monaco	2	
October 23	(Serbia) Filip Petrušev	(Greece) Olympiacos	(Serbia) Crvena Zvezda	Loan	
November 8	(Turkey) Onuralp Bitim	(Turkey) Fenerbahçe	(Germany) Bayern Munich	Loan	
November 25	(United States) David McCormack	(Italy) Olimpia Milano	(Germany) ALBA Berlin	1	
December 22	(United States) Trevion Williams	(Germany) ALBA Berlin	(Israel) Maccabi Tel Aviv	2	
December 23	(South Sudan) Wenyen Gabriel	(Israel) Maccabi Tel Aviv	(Greece) Panathinaikos	1	
January 10	(Germany) Michael Kessens	(France) Paris	(Germany) ALBA Berlin	1	
January 23	(Germany) Justus Hollatz	(Turkey) Anadolu Efes	(Germany) Bayern Munich	4	

=== To a EuroLeague team ===
^{*}	Denotes Euroleague rookie players

Date	Player	From	To	Contract years	Ref.
Off-season
May 15	(Australia) Will McDowell-White*	New Zealand Breakers	(Germany) ALBA Berlin	2	
June 8	(Serbia) Uroš Plavšić*	(Serbia) Mega	(Serbia) Crvena zvezda	3	
June 9	(United States) Kamar Baldwin*	(Italy) Trento	(Spain) Baskonia	2	
June 18	(Lithuania) Deividas Sirvydis*	(Lithuania) Lietkabelis	(Lithuania) Žalgiris	2+1	
June 19	(United States) Armoni Brooks*	(United States) Ontario Clippers	(Italy) Olimpia Milano	2	
June 20	(France) Neal Sako*	(France) Cholet	(France) ASVEL	2	
June 20	(France) Frank Ntilikina	(United States) Charlotte Hornets	(Serbia) Partizan	2	
June 22	(North Macedonia) Nenad Dimitrijević*	(Russia) UNICS Kazan	(Italy) Olimpia Milano	2	
June 25	(France) Léopold Cavalière*	(France) Strasbourg	(France) Paris	2	
June 27	(United States) Matt Mitchell*	(Turkey) Beşiktaş	(Lithuania) Žalgiris	1+1	
June 27	(United States) Vitto Brown*	(Turkey) Karşıyaka	(France) Monaco	2	
June 28	(United Kingdom) Admiral Schofield*	(United States) Orlando Magic	(France) ASVEL	1	
July 2	(France) Jaylen Hoard*	(Israel) Hapoel Tel Aviv	(Israel) Maccabi Tel Aviv	2	
July 2	(United States) Shaquille Harrison*	(United States) South Bay Lakers	(France) ASVEL	1	
July 3	(United States) Levi Randolph*	(Israel) Hapoel Jerusalem	(Israel) Maccabi Tel Aviv	1+1	
July 3	(Dominican Republic) Andrés Feliz*	(Spain) Joventut	(Spain) Real Madrid	3	
July 3	(Senegal) Ousmane Diop*	(Italy) Dinamo Sassari	(Italy) Olimpia Milano	2	
July 4	(United States) Stanley Johnson*	(United States) Stockton Kings	(Turkey) Anadolu Efes	1	
July 5	(Ivory Coast) Kevin Yebo*	(Germany) Niners Chemnitz	(Germany) Bayern Munich	2	
July 10	(South Sudan) Wenyen Gabriel*	(Puerto Rico) Vaqueros de Bayamón	(Israel) Maccabi Tel Aviv	1+1	
July 10	(United States) Tyrone Wallace*	(Turkey) Türk Telekom	(Lithuania) Žalgiris	1	
July 11	(United States) Tarik Black	(Italy) Reggiana	(France) ASVEL	1	
July 11	(United States) Trevion Williams*	(Germany) Ratiopharm Ulm	(Germany) ALBA Berlin	2	
July 12	(Canada) Xavier Rathan-Mayes*	(Russia) Enisey	(Spain) Real Madrid	2	
July 12	(France) Juhann Begarin*	(France) Nanterre 92	(France) Monaco	3	
July 20	(United States) Matt Morgan*	(United Kingdom) London Lions	(Italy) Virtus Bologna	1+1	
July 20	(Latvia) Andrejs Gražulis*	(Italy) Trento	(Italy) Virtus Bologna	1+1	
July 20	(Italy) Nicola Akele*	(Italy) Brescia	(Italy) Virtus Bologna	1+1	
July 20	(Italy) Mouhamet Diouf*	(Spain) Breogán	(Italy) Virtus Bologna	1+1	
July 20	(Italy) Riccardo Visconti*	(Italy) Pesaro	(Italy) Virtus Bologna	1+1	
July 23	(France) Melvin Ajinça*	(France) Saint-Quentin	(France) ASVEL	1	
July 23	(United States) Daulton Hommes	(Italy) Trento	(France) Paris	1	
July 25	(United States) Justin Anderson	(Spain) Valencia	(Spain) Barcelona	1	
July 25	(Bulgaria) Sasha Vezenkov	(Canada) Toronto Raptors	(Greece) Olympiacos	5	
July 26	(Spain) Juan Núñez	(Germany) Ratiopharm Ulm	(Spain) Barcelona	3	
July 27	(United States) Rayjon Tucker*	(Italy) Reyer Venezia	(Italy) Virtus Bologna	1+1	
July 29	(Lithuania) Mantas Rubštavičius	New Zealand Breakers	(Lithuania) Žalgiris	4	
July 30	(Nigeria) Chimezie Metu*	(United States) Detroit Pistons	(Spain) Barcelona	1	
August 3	(United States) David McCormack*	(Turkey) Galatasaray	(Italy) Olimpia Milano	1	
August 5	(Croatia) Luka Šamanić*	(United States) Utah Jazz	(Turkey) Fenerbahçe	2	
August 5	(Nigeria) Jordan Nwora*	(Canada) Toronto Raptors	(Turkey) Anadolu Efes	1	
August 7	(Turkey) Furkan Korkmaz	(United States) Philadelphia 76ers	(France) Monaco	1+1	
August 8	(United States) Trent Forrest*	(United States) Atlanta Hawks	(Spain) Baskonia	2	
August 11	(United States) Daryl Macon	(China) Shenzhen Leopards	(Israel) Maccabi Tel Aviv	1+1	
August 14	(France) Théo Maledon	(United States) Sioux Falls Skyforce	(France) ASVEL	1	
August 19	(Uganda) Brandon Davies	(Spain) Valencia	(Serbia) Partizan	2	
August 19	(Canada) Isiaha Mike*	(France) Bourg	(Serbia) Partizan	2	
August 19	(Serbia) Arijan Lakić*	(Croatia) Zadar	(Serbia) Partizan	1	
August 19	(United States) Duane Washington Jr.*	(United States) Westchester Knicks	(Serbia) Partizan	1	
August 19	(Serbia) Aleksej Pokuševski	(United States) Charlotte Hornets	(Serbia) Partizan	3	
August 19	(Croatia) Mario Nakić	(Bosnia and Herzegovina) Igokea	(Serbia) Partizan	2	
August 19	(South Sudan) Carlik Jones*	(China) Zhejiang Golden Bulls	(Serbia) Partizan	2	
August 20	(Spain) Usman Garuba	(United States) Golden State Warriors	(Spain) Real Madrid	3	
August 22	(Israel) Will Rayman*	(France) Saint-Quentin	(Israel) Maccabi Tel Aviv	2	
August 30	(Turkey) Ömer Yurtseven	(United States) Utah Jazz	(Greece) Panathinaikos	1+1	
September 2	(France) Evan Fournier*	(United States) Detroit Pistons	(Greece) Olympiacos	2	
September 7	(Turkey) Cedi Osman	(United States) San Antonio Spurs	(Greece) Panathinaikos	1	
September 11	(Canada) Khem Birch	(Spain) Girona	(Turkey) Fenerbahçe	1	
September 18	(Serbia) Boban Marjanović	(United States) Houston Rockets	(Turkey) Fenerbahçe	1	
September 27	(Guinea) Alpha Kaba*	(Spain) Valencia	(Israel) Maccabi Tel Aviv	6 weeks	
In-season
October 13	(United States) Saben Lee*	(Turkey) Manisa	(Israel) Maccabi Tel Aviv	2	
October 18	(United States) Skylar Mays*	(United States) Minnesota Timberwolves	(Turkey) Fenerbahçe	1	
October 31	(United States) Lonnie Walker IV*	(United States) Boston Celtics	(Lithuania) Žalgiris	1	
November 4	(United States) David DeJulius*	(Greece) Aris	(Israel) Maccabi Tel Aviv	1	
November 4	(Italy) Nico Mannion	(Italy) Varese	(Italy) Olimpia Milano	3	
November 8	(United States) André Roberson*	(France) Cholet	(France) ASVEL	1	
November 8	(Turkey) Onuralp Bitim	(United States) Chicago Bulls	(Turkey) Fenerbahçe	4	
November 13	(South Sudan) Marial Shayok	(China) Liaoning Flying Leopards	(Israel) Maccabi Tel Aviv	2	
November 20	(United States) Freddie Gillespie	New Zealand Breakers	(Italy) Olimpia Milano	1	
November 25	(Brazil) Raul Neto*	(Brazil) Pinheiros	(Spain) Barcelona	1	
December 9	(United States) John Brown		(Serbia) Crvena zvezda	1+1	
December 11	(Ghana) Nathan Mensah*	(United States) Austin Spurs	(Greece) Olympiacos	1	
December 30	(Croatia) Luka Šamanić*	(Croatia) Cibona	(Spain) Baskonia	1+1	
January 10	(United States) Errick McCollum	(Turkey) Karşıyaka	(Turkey) Fenerbahçe	1	
January 12	(United States) PJ Dozier	(United States) Minnesota Timberwolves	(Turkey) Anadolu Efes	1	
January 16	(United States) Dennis Smith Jr.*	(United States) Wisconsin Herd	(Spain) Real Madrid	1	
January 22	(Ghana) Ben Bentil	(Italy) Napoli	(France) ASVEL	1	
January 24	(Angola) Bruno Fernando*	(Canada) Toronto Raptors	(Spain) Real Madrid	2	
February 1	(United States) Justin Holiday*	(United States) Denver Nuggets	(Italy) Virtus Bologna	1	
February 3	(Angola) Jilson Bango*	(Spain) Zaragoza	(Turkey) Fenerbahçe	3	
February 10	(Germany) Daniel Theis	(United States) New Orleans Pelicans	(France) Monaco	1	
February 19	(United States) Jimmy Clark III*	(Israel) Bnei Herzliya	(Israel) Maccabi Tel Aviv	3	
February 26	(Germany) Tibor Pleiß	(Italy) Trapani Shark	(Greece) Panathinaikos	1	
February 26	(United States) Isaiah Wong*	(United States) Charlotte Hornets	(Lithuania) Žalgiris	1	
February 26	(United States) Robert Baker*	(United States) Osceola Magic	(Germany) ALBA Berlin		
February 26	(United States) Saben Lee	(Turkey) Manisa	(Greece) Olympiacos		

=== Contract extensions ===
Date	Player	Team	New contract	Ref.
Off-season
June 5	(Lithuania) Rokas Giedraitis	(Serbia) Crvena zvezda	2026	
June 7	(Estonia) Sander Raieste	(Spain) Baskonia	2025	
June 9	(Serbia) Branko Lazić	(Serbia) Crvena zvezda	2026	
June 13	(Serbia) Miloš Teodosić	(Serbia) Crvena zvezda	2025	
June 14	(United States) Mike James	(France) Monaco	2027	
June 21	(United States) Jaron Blossomgame	(France) Monaco	2026	
June 27	(France) Charles Kahudi	(France) ASVEL	2025	
June 28	(Italy) Stefano Tonut	(Italy) Olimpia Milano	2026	
June 28	(Brazil) Yago dos Santos	(Serbia) Crvena zvezda	2027	
July 2	(Croatia) Mario Hezonja	(Spain) Real Madrid	2029	
July 4	(United States) Nigel Hayes-Davis	(Turkey) Fenerbahçe	2027	
July 4	(France) Edwin Jackson	(France) ASVEL	2025	
July 5	(Cape Verde) Edy Tavares	(Spain) Real Madrid	2029	
July 8	(Bosnia and Herzegovina) Džanan Musa	(Spain) Real Madrid	2025	
July 9	(Germany) Elias Harris	(Germany) Bayern Munich	2026	
July 10	(Germany) Nick Weiler-Babb	(Germany) Bayern Munich	2026	
July 10	(United States) Jerian Grant	(Greece) Panathinaikos	2026	
July 11	(Lithuania) Marius Grigonis	(Greece) Panathinaikos	2027	
July 11	(France) Nando de Colo	(France) ASVEL	2025	
July 15	(Israel) John DiBartolomeo	(Israel) Maccabi Tel Aviv	2026	
July 15	(Lithuania) Donatas Motiejūnas	(France) Monaco	2026	
July 18	(Israel) Roman Sorkin	(Israel) Maccabi Tel Aviv	2029	
July 25	(Spain) Sergio Llull	(Spain) Real Madrid	2025	
July 29	(Israel) Jake Cohen	(Israel) Maccabi Tel Aviv	2025	
August 1	(United States) Carsen Edwards	(Germany) Bayern Munich	2025	
August 4	(Israel) Tamir Blatt	(Israel) Maccabi Tel Aviv	2026	
August 4	(France) Élie Okobo	(France) Monaco	2026	
August 6	(Israel) Rafi Menco	(Israel) Maccabi Tel Aviv	2025	
August 7	(United States) Matt Thomas	(Germany) ALBA Berlin	2025	
August 8	(Turkey) Melih Mahmutoğlu	(Turkey) Fenerbahçe	2025	
August 13	(Turkey) Mert Ekşioğlu	(Turkey) Fenerbahçe	2026	
August 14	(France) Matthew Strazel	(France) Monaco	2027	
September 3	(Spain) Alberto Abalde	(Spain) Real Madrid	2027	
September 15	(Israel) Omer Mayer	(Israel) Maccabi Tel Aviv	2027	
In-season
December 31	(France) Mathias Lessort	(Greece) Panathinaikos	2028	
January 4	(Spain) Juancho Hernangómez	(Greece) Panathinaikos	2027	
March 11	(France) Sylvain Francisco	(Lithuania) Žalgiris	2027	
April 1	(Germany) Niels Giffey	(Germany) Bayern Munich	2027	
April 1	(United States) Kevin Punter	(Spain) Barcelona	2028	
April 10	(United States) Kendrick Nunn	(Greece) Panathinaikos	2028	
April 15	(Turkey) Cedi Osman	(Greece) Panathinaikos	2027	
April 19	(United States) Alpha Diallo	(France) Monaco	2028	
April 25	(United States) Sterling Brown	(Serbia) Partizan	2027	

=== Leaving a EuroLeague team ===
Date	Player	From	To	Ref.
Off-season
June 7	(United States) Mike Scott	(France) ASVEL	(Puerto Rico) Gigantes de Carolina	
June 18	(Spain) Carlos Alocén	(Spain) Real Madrid	(Spain) Gran Canaria	
June 18	(United States) Nate Sestina	(Turkey) Fenerbahçe	(Spain) Valencia	
June 25	(United States) Johnathan Motley	(Turkey) Fenerbahçe	(Israel) Hapoel Tel Aviv	
June 25	(United States) Chris Chiozza	(Spain) Baskonia	(Turkey) Manisa	
June 25	(North Macedonia) Jordan Theodore	(Spain) Baskonia	(Germany) Skyliners Frankfurt	
June 25	(Spain) Ricky Rubio	(Spain) Barcelona		
June 26	(Ivory Coast) Alex Poythress	(Italy) Olimpia Milano	(Russia) Zenit	
June 26	(Canada) Kassius Robertson	(Spain) Valencia	(Spain) Joventut	
June 28	(Israel) Noam Yaacov	(France) ASVEL	(Israel) Hapoel Tel Aviv	
June 28	(Greece) Lefteris Mantzoukas	(Greece) Panathinaikos	(Greece) Aris	
June 30	(Senegal) Boubacar Toure	(Spain) Valencia	(China) Liaoning Flying Leopards	
July 1	(Germany) Nelson Weidemann	(Germany) Bayern Munich	(Germany) Ratiopharm Ulm	
July 1	(Germany) Jan Niklas Wimberg	(Germany) Bayern Munich	(Germany) Hamburg Towers	
July 2	(Lithuania) Nedas Montvila	(Lithuania) Žalgiris	(Lithuania) Nevėžis	
July 2	(United States) Javonte Smart	(Serbia) Crvena zvezda	(United States) Osceola Magic	
July 3	(Lithuania) Karolis Lukošiūnas	(Lithuania) Žalgiris	(Lithuania) Juventus	
July 3	(Italy) Bruno Mascolo	(Italy) Virtus Bologna	(Italy) Treviso	
July 3	(United States) Luke Sikma	(Greece) Olympiacos		
July 4	(Hungary) Ádám Hanga	(Serbia) Crvena zvezda	(Spain) Joventut	
July 4	(Spain) Dani Díez	(Spain) Baskonia	(Spain) San Pablo Burgos	
July 6	(Serbia) Nikola Topić	(Serbia) Crvena zvezda	(United States) Oklahoma City Thunder	
July 9	(Estonia) Maik Kotsar	(Spain) Baskonia	(Japan) Yokohama B-Corsairs	
July 10	(Slovenia) Mike Tobey	(Serbia) Crvena zvezda	(Spain) Gran Canaria	
July 11	(United States) James Webb	(Israel) Maccabi Tel Aviv	(Turkey) Karşıyaka	
July 12	(Lithuania) Danielius Lavrinovičius	(Lithuania) Žalgiris	(Lithuania) Lietkabelis	
July 12	(Turkey) Şehmus Hazer	(Turkey) Fenerbahçe	(Turkey) Bahçeşehir Koleji	
July 13	(Croatia) Jaleen Smith	(Serbia) Partizan	(Turkey) Bahçeşehir Koleji	
July 15	(United States) PJ Dozier	(Serbia) Partizan	(United States) Minnesota Timberwolves	
July 17	(Germany) Johannes Thiemann	(Germany) ALBA Berlin	(Japan) Gunma Crane Thunders	
July 18	(Spain) Oriol Paulí	(Spain) Barcelona	(Spain) Lleida	
July 20	(United States) Antonius Cleveland	(Israel) Maccabi Tel Aviv	(Russia) Lokomotiv	
July 20	(Latvia) Rihards Lomažs	(Italy) Virtus Bologna	(Turkey) Merkezefendi	
July 20	(United States) Jordan Mickey	(Italy) Virtus Bologna	(China) Qingdao Eagles	
July 21	(Italy) Awudu Abass	(Italy) Virtus Bologna	(United Arab Emirates) Dubai	
July 22	(Greece) Georgios Tanoulis	(Greece) Olympiacos	(Greece) Maroussi	
July 23	(Poland) Mateusz Ponitka	(Serbia) Partizan	(Turkey) Bahçeşehir Koleji	
July 23	(Serbia) Danilo Anđušić	(Serbia) Partizan	(United Arab Emirates) Dubai	
July 23	(United States) Jared Harper	(Spain) Valencia	(Israel) Hapoel Jerusalem	
July 25	(Serbia) Aleksa Avramović	(Serbia) Partizan	(Russia) CSKA Moscow	
July 25	(United States) Freddie Gillespie	(Serbia) Crvena zvezda	New Zealand Breakers	
July 29	(Greece) Michalis Lountzis	(Greece) Olympiacos	(Greece) Promitheas	
July 29	(Lithuania) Mantas Rubštavičius	(Lithuania) Žalgiris	(Lithuania) Lietkabelis	
July 31	(France) Amine Noua	(Turkey) Fenerbahçe	(Spain) Granada	
August 1	(United States) Trey Thompkins	(Serbia) Crvena zvezda	(Spain) Coruña	
August 1	(Croatia) Krešimir Nikić	(Germany) ALBA Berlin	(Spain) Zamora	
August 2	(Canada) Kevin Pangos	(Spain) Valencia	(Italy) Napoli	
August 4	(Nigeria) James Nnaji	(Spain) Barcelona	(Spain) Girona	
August 8	(Germany) Tibor Pleiß	(Turkey) Anadolu Efes	(Italy) Trapani Shark	
August 9	(Georgia (country)) Joe Thomasson	(Israel) Maccabi Tel Aviv	(Spain) Gran Canaria	
August 13	(Montenegro) Dino Radončić	(Germany) Bayern Munich	(Spain) Real Betis	
August 14	(Turkey) Melih Tunca	(Turkey) Anadolu Efes	(Turkey) Türk Telekom	
August 21	(United States) James Nunnally	(Serbia) Partizan	(China) Zhejiang Lions	
August 23	(United States) Edmond Sumner	(Lithuania) Žalgiris	(China) Sichuan Blue Whales	
August 29	(France) Guerschon Yabusele	(Spain) Real Madrid	(United States) Philadelphia 76ers	
August 30	(Brazil) Bruno Caboclo	(Serbia) Partizan	(Israel) Hapoel Tel Aviv	
August 31	(Serbia) Uroš Trifunović	(Serbia) Partizan	(Turkey) Tofaş	
September 1	(France) Damien Inglis	(Spain) Valencia	(Japan) Yokohama B-Corsairs	
September 2	(Poland) Aleksander Balcerowski	(Greece) Panathinaikos	(Spain) Unicaja	
September 10	(United States) John Brown	(France) Monaco		
September 12	(Serbia) Stefan Lazarević	(Serbia) Crvena zvezda	(Serbia) FMP	
September 12	(United States) Daryl Macon	(Israel) Maccabi Tel Aviv		
September 13	(Croatia) Luka Šamanić	(Turkey) Fenerbahçe	(Croatia) Cibona	
September 13	(United States) Deshaun Thomas	(France) ASVEL		
September 26	(United States) Frank Kaminsky	(Serbia) Partizan	(United States) Phoenix Suns	
In-season
November 14	(United States) Devontae Cacok	(Italy) Virtus Bologna		
November 19	(Chad) Khalifa Koumadje	(Germany) ALBA Berlin	(China) Shandong Hi-Speed Kirin	
November 22	(United States) Saben Lee	(Israel) Maccabi Tel Aviv	(Turkey) Manisa	
November 27	(United Kingdom) Admiral Schofield	(France) ASVEL		
November 28	(Israel) Yam Madar	(Germany) Bayern Munich	(Israel) Hapoel Tel Aviv	
December 2	(Serbia) Dalibor Ilić	(Serbia) Crvena Zvezda	(Serbia) Spartak Subotica	
December 18	(Guinea) Alpha Kaba	(Israel) Maccabi Tel Aviv	(South Korea) Goyang Sono Skygunners	
December 25	(Turkey) Erten Gazi	(Turkey) Fenerbahçe	(Italy) Dinamo Sassari	
December 27	(Serbia) Uroš Plavšić	(Serbia) Crvena Zvezda	(Turkey) Beşiktaş	
December 29	(Serbia) Boban Marjanović	(Turkey) Fenerbahçe	(China) Zhejiang Lions	
December 30	(Turkey) Furkan Korkmaz	(France) Monaco	(Turkey) Bahçeşehir Koleji	
January 2	(Brazil) Raul Neto	(Spain) Barcelona		
January 13	(United States) Tyrone Wallace	(Lithuania) Žalgiris	(Turkey) Galatasaray	
January 27	(Slovenia) Žiga Samar	(Germany) ALBA Berlin	(Spain) Gran Canaria	
February 5	(United States) Skylar Mays	(Turkey) Fenerbahçe	(United States) Iowa Wolves	
February 11	(United States) Stanley Johnson	(Turkey) Anadolu Efes	(United States) South Bay Lakers	
February 12	(Greece) Kostas Antetokounmpo	(Greece) Panathinaikos	(Spain) UCAM Murcia	
February 20	(Lithuania) Tomas Dimša	(Lithuania) Žalgiris	(Spain) Zaragoza	
February 21	(United States) Lonnie Walker IV	(Lithuania) Žalgiris	(United States) Philadelphia 76ers	
February 21	(United States) David DeJulius	(Israel) Maccabi Tel Aviv	(Turkey) Bursaspor	

== See also ==
- List of 2024–25 NBA season transactions
