= Bandırma =

- District and municipality
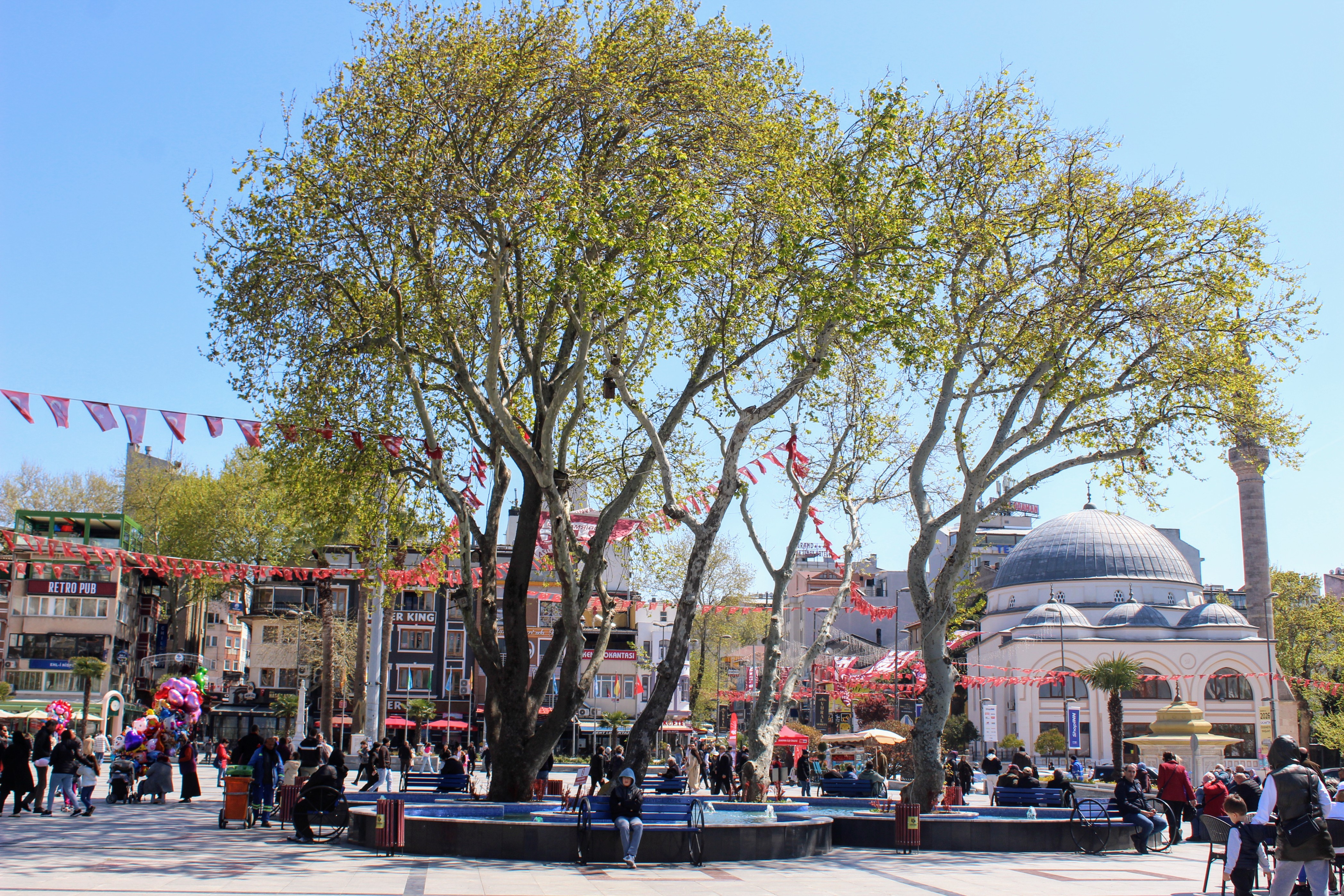
- Cumhuriyet Square in Bandırma

- Logo

- Map showing Bandırma District in Balıkesir Province

- Location within Turkey Location within Marmara
- Coordinates: 40°21′14″N 27°58′15.5″E
- Country: Turkey
- Province: Balıkesir

Government
  - Mayor: Dursun Mirza (CHP)
- Area: 755 km^{2} (292 sq mi)
- Elevation: 20 m (66 ft)
- Population (2024): 167,363
  - Density: 222/km^{2} (574/sq mi)
- Time zone: UTC+3 (TRT)
- Postal code: 10200
- Area code: 0266
- Website: www.bandirma.bel.tr

Bandırma (Turkish: [banˈdɯɾma]) is a city, municipality and district of Balıkesir Province, northwestern Turkey. Its area is 755 km^{2}, and its population is 167,363 (2024). Bandırma is located in the south of the Marmara Sea, in the bay with the same name, and is an important port city. It is approximately two hours away from Istanbul, İzmir and Bursa.

Bandırma may be reached by land, sea, air and rail. Regular ship trips are made to Tekirdağ and Istanbul from Bandırma every day. The accelerated train services between İzmir and Bandırma, which are made every day in connection with the ferry, offer a different transportation alternative.

Bandırma is home to the fifth-largest port in Turkey, second in the Marmara sea to Istanbul. The annual average trade volume of Bandırma Port, which meets 90% of the exports from Balıkesir Province, is 800 million dollars.

== History ==
=== Pre Byzantine and Byzantine period ===
Bandırma, which has been named as Cyzicus (in greek Κύζικος) or Pànormos (in greek Πάνορμος) in the past, is a very old settlement center. It is thought that Bandırma was founded between the 8th century and the 10th century BC from a sarcophagus found during excavations in Cyzicus, for which there is no exact information about its establishment.

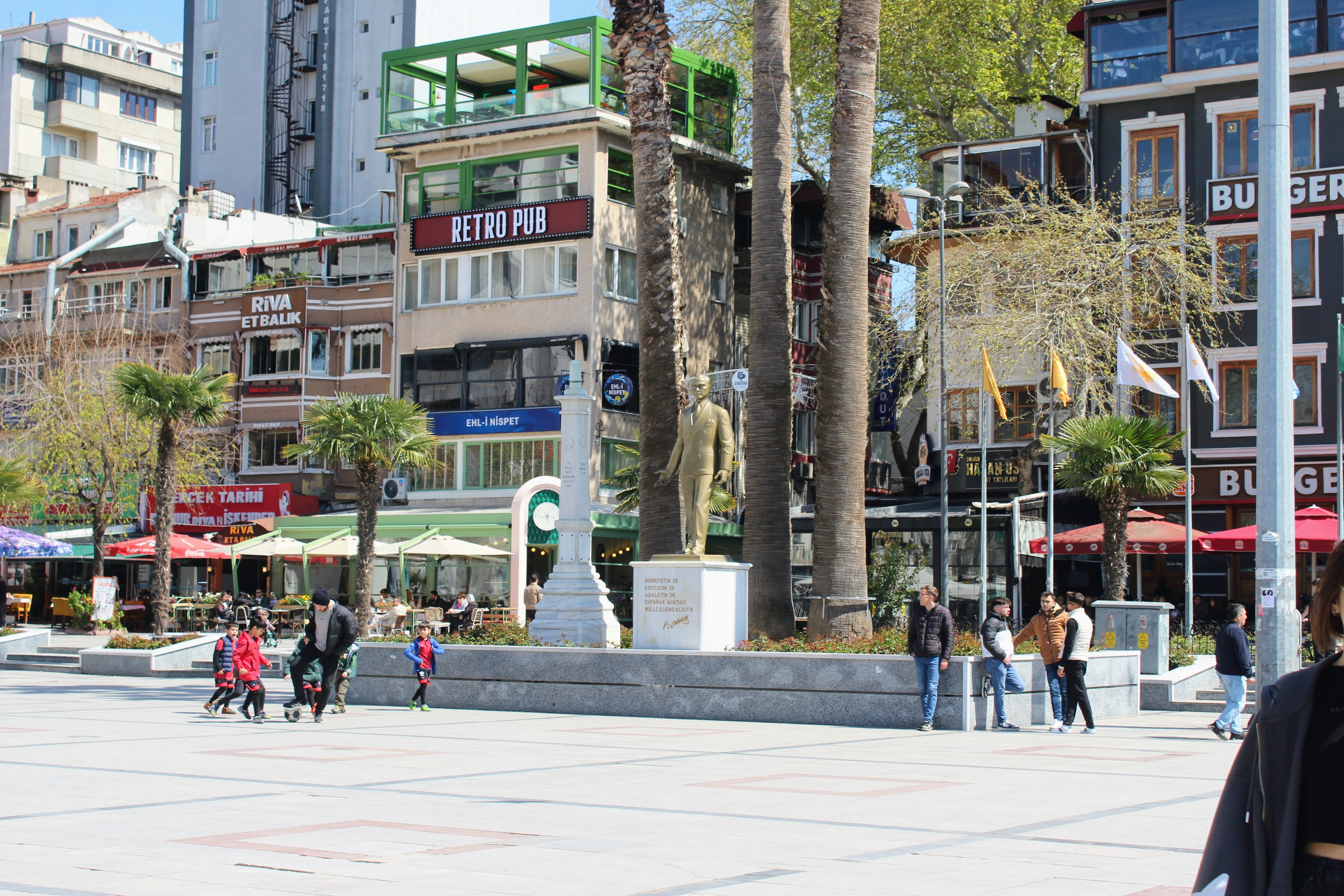
A statue of Atatürk in Cumhuriyet Square, Bandırma.

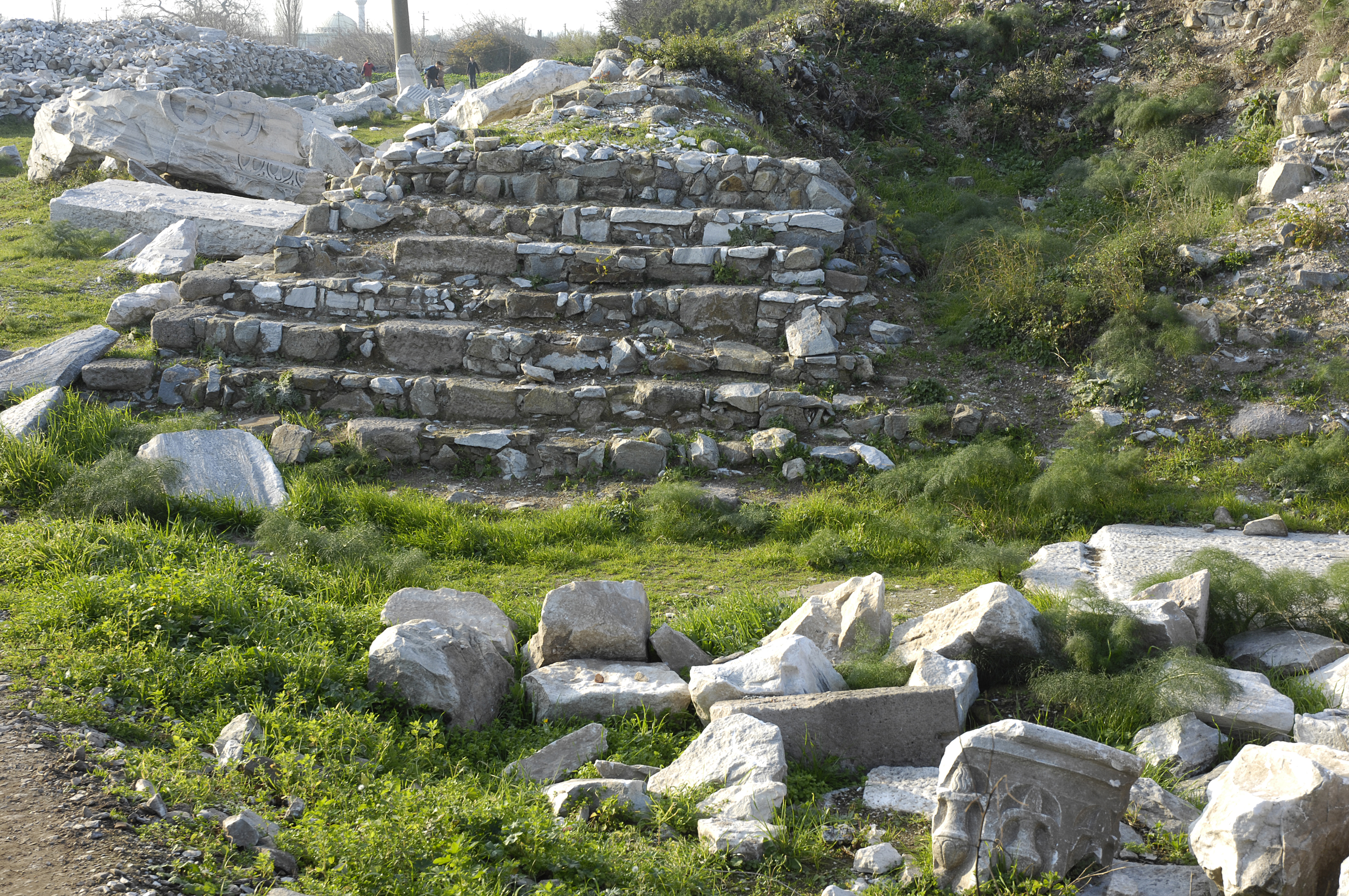
Bandırma Cyzicus Zeus temple

The first archaeological research about the region was carried out by Kurt Bittel in 1952 and in the light of the archaeological data obtained as a result of excavations and geographical information provided by the ancient texts, from late Neolithic Age. Scientific studies were carried out in 1954 by Prof. Dr. Ekrem Akurgal. The excavation continued until 1960, and in 1988, Prof. Dr. It was restarted by Tomris Bakır. Common archaeological data in both excavations reveal the history of the region, determining that there are Neolithic settlements dating back to the middle of the 6th millennium BC and Chalcolithic settlements from the end of the 5th millennium BC. The ancient ruins of Daskyleion are also in the region. It is thought that the first settlement was inhabited between 7,000 BC and 5,000 BC. The settlement of Panormos, which means "safe harbor", was within the ancient region of Mysia. In 334 BC, Alexander the Great captured the territory from the Persians. After the death of Alexander, the region ended up as part of the Kingdom of Pergamon until it was conquered by the Romans. Bandırma, which remained in the Eastern Roman Empire after the division of the Roman Empire in 330, was captured by Suleiman ibn Qutalmish of the Sultanate of Rum in 1076; however, the region passed back to the Eastern Roman Empire in 1106.

=== Ottoman period ===
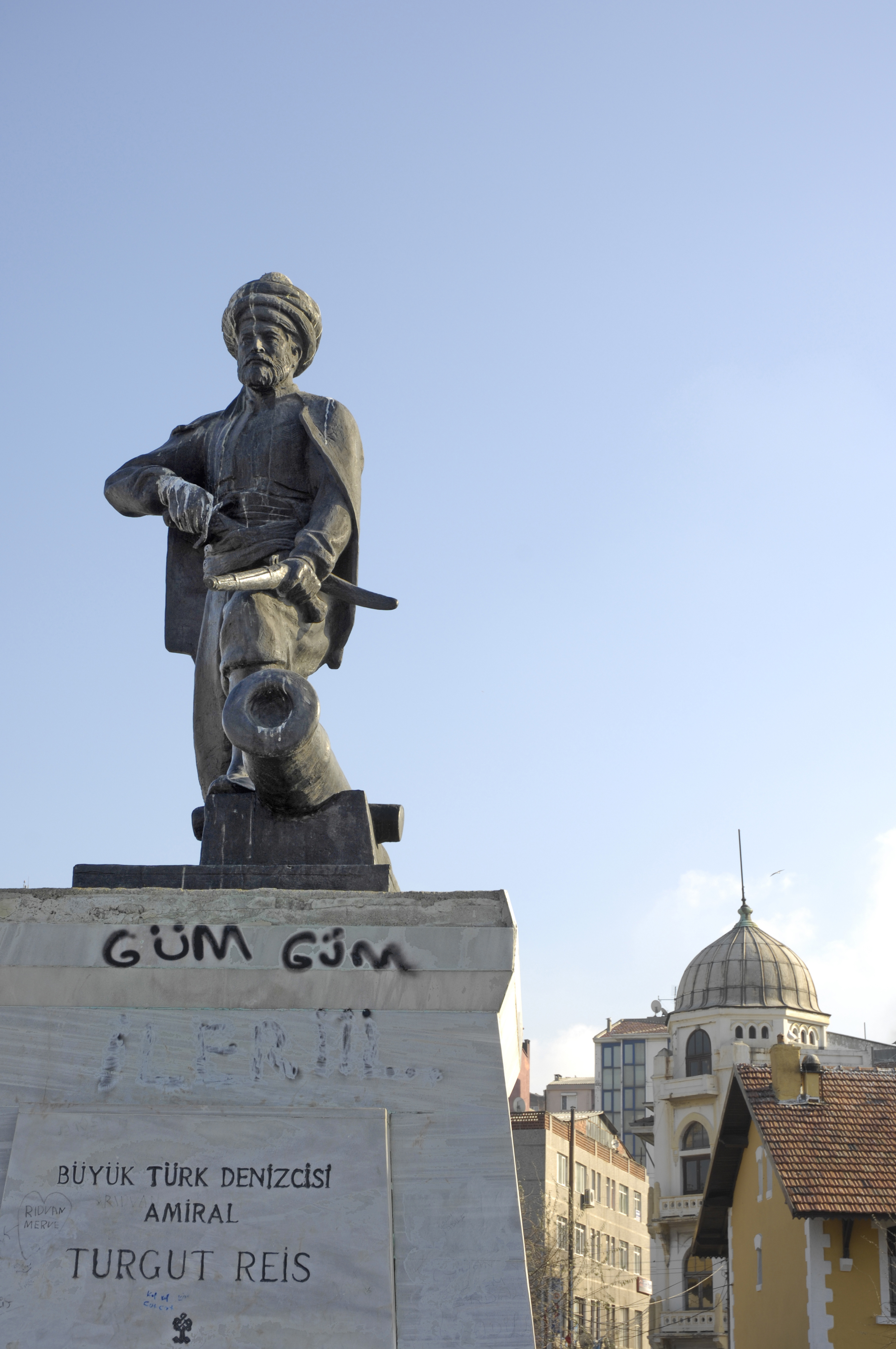
Bandırma Turgut Reis monument

It was attached to the Kapıdağı District of Erdek District in 1830 and became a separate district after the Tanzimat. Bandırma, which suffered a great fire in 1874, was populated further with the arrival of Crimean and Romanian immigrants after the Ottoman-Russian War of 1877–78. Bandirma was then occupied by the Greek Army in 1920 but was destroyed by the Greeks on their retreat. It was liberated on the early morning of September 17, 1922. During its destruction many of its Turkish inhabitants were burned inside the mosque.

== Geography ==
Bandırma's lands are quite flat in the coastal zone. These plains, cut with slight hills, rise to the south. Kocaavşa Creek, which springs within Bandırma, flows into Kuş Lake. Originating from Çanakkale Province, Gönen Stream passes through the north of the district and flows into the Sea of Marmara from the west of the Kapıdağ Peninsula. To the south of Bandırma is Lake Kuş, also known as Lake Manyas or Bird Paradise. The area of 24,047 hectares where this lake is located was declared a national park in 1959 with the name Kuş Cenneti National Park. Evliya Çelebi said "It is not that deep, and it's as if its water is the water of life (âb-ı hayat). Trout, pike, and a variety of delicious fish are caught in it. There are hunters who pay taxes to the state. So not everyone can fish for pleasure and for trade. In winter, this lake, It is filled with geese, ducks, swans, cormorants, mallards, gulls, goldfinches and other beautiful birds." about this lake. There are 239 bird species in the park according to the periods. This park was included in the Ramsar Convention in 1998.

=== Location ===
To the north of Bandırma is the Kapıdağ Peninsula, which is part of Erdek district, and the sea of Marmara. Manyas district and lake are to the south, Gönen is to the west and Karacabey of Bursa province is located to the east of Bandırma.

=== Composition ===
There are 55 neighbourhoods in Bandırma District:

- 100. Yıl
- Akçapınar
- Aksakal
- Altıyüzevler
- Ayyıldız
- Bentbaşı
- Bereketli
- Beyköy
- Bezirci
- Çakılköy
- Çalışkanlar
- Çarıkköy
- Çepni
- Çınarlı
- Çinge
- Dedeoba
- Dere
- Doğa
- Doğanpınar
- Doğruca
- Dutliman
- Edincik
- Emre
- Ergili
- Erikli
- Eskiziraatli
- Gölyaka
- Günaydın
- Hacıyusuf
- Haydarçavuş
- Hıdırköy
- İhsaniye
- Karaçalılık
- Kayacık
- Kirazlı
- Külefli
- Kuşcenneti
- Levent
- Mahbubeler
- Misakça
- Ömerli
- Onyedieylül
- Orhaniye
- Paşabayır
- Paşakent
- Paşakonak
- Paşamescit
- Şirinçavuş
- Sunullah
- Yeni
- Yenice
- Yenisığırcı
- Yeniyenice
- Yeniziraatli
- Yeşilçonlu

=== Climate ===
Bandırma has a hot-summer Mediterranean climate (Köppen: Csa).

Climate data for Bandırma (1991–2020)
Month	Jan	Feb	Mar	Apr	May	Jun	Jul	Aug	Sep	Oct	Nov	Dec	Year
Mean daily maximum °C (°F)	9.1 (48.4)	10.2 (50.4)	13.1 (55.6)	17.4 (63.3)	22.1 (71.8)	26.7 (80.1)	28.7 (83.7)	28.7 (83.7)	25.3 (77.5)	20.6 (69.1)	15.5 (59.9)	10.8 (51.4)	19.1 (66.4)
Daily mean °C (°F)	5.4 (41.7)	6.1 (43.0)	8.5 (47.3)	12.3 (54.1)	17.2 (63.0)	21.9 (71.4)	24.4 (75.9)	24.7 (76.5)	20.9 (69.6)	16.3 (61.3)	11.2 (52.2)	7.2 (45.0)	14.7 (58.5)
Mean daily minimum °C (°F)	2.3 (36.1)	2.8 (37.0)	4.7 (40.5)	8.0 (46.4)	12.6 (54.7)	17.2 (63.0)	20.3 (68.5)	21.1 (70.0)	16.7 (62.1)	12.5 (54.5)	7.5 (45.5)	4.0 (39.2)	10.8 (51.4)
Average precipitation mm (inches)	85.74 (3.38)	80.6 (3.17)	68.18 (2.68)	49.32 (1.94)	35.42 (1.39)	22.47 (0.88)	16.04 (0.63)	12.47 (0.49)	54.64 (2.15)	82.73 (3.26)	77.99 (3.07)	116.2 (4.57)	701.8 (27.63)
Average precipitation days (≥ 1.0 mm)	9.1	8.8	8.5	7.2	4.9	3.5	2.0	2.6	4.4	6.7	7.5	11.4	76.6
Average relative humidity (%)	79.5	77.8	74.9	72.8	71.8	68.5	68.9	71.6	70.6	75.8	77.5	79.6	74.1
Source: NOAA

== Economy ==
Bandırma, according to a ranking made in 2004 of all provincial centers and towns across Turkey, in one of Turkey's most advanced 23 districts. In addition, the district ranked 3rd among 87 districts in the list of provincial districts prepared according to various criteria. The district is the fastest growing district among the districts of Balıkesir province. Today, Bandırma has become the economic center of Balıkesir in the industrial branch. According to 2008 data, 34 out of 100 companies paying the highest corporate tax in Balıkesir province and 4 out of the top 10 companies are in Bandırma district. The share of the district's corporate tax throughout the province is 20.6%. Again, according to 2008 data, 17 out of 100 people who pay the highest income tax in the province and 5 out of 10 people are in Bandırma district. With these numbers, the share of taxpayers from Bandırma throughout the province is 29%.

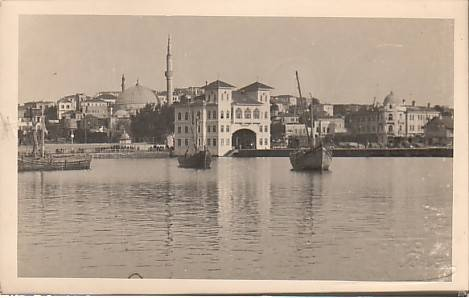
Town Hall and Harbor, 1920s

The district economy employs 10,000 people. 50% of this employment volume is employed in industry, 20% in agriculture and 30% in services. 30% of the population working in the industrial sector works in the agriculture-based industry, 10% in the chemical industry, 5% in the mining industry and 5% in the machinery industry.

While 25% of Balıkesir province economy is produced in Altıeylül and Karesi, 14% is produced by Bandırma.

=== Foundations ===
In the district, Bandırma Chamber of Commerce was established by Yahya Sezai Uzay in 1926 and Bandırma Commodity Exchange in 1940. Bandirma Commodity Exchange is the twenty-third oldest stock exchange in Turkey. Bandırma Missile Club – Husat, founded in 1957 by the students of Şehit Mehmet Gönenç High School, is another important organization.

=== Trade ===
Trade in Bandırma is usually done by sea. Bandırma Port, the second largest after Istanbul's on the Marmara Sea, is Turkey's fifth largest port. The depth of the port is 12 meters and 15 ships up to 20 thousand gross tonnage can load and unload at the same time. Bandırma's export products consist of mines, chicken meat, eggs and seafood. The trade volume made is about $800 million.

=== Agriculture and livestock ===
The most intensive activity in rural areas in Bandırma is crop production. Corn, oats, sugar beets and broad beans are the most produced products. Wine grapes are produced in the vineyards. Parsley production is important in the district where vegetable growing is also developed.

Cattle and sheep are also raised in the district. In the Merino breeding farm established in the district, breeding rams and sheep are raised. Poultry farming, which is generally concentrated in big cities and its surroundings, is an important source of income in the district. In addition, fishing is carried out on the shores of the Marmara Sea and Lake Manyas.

=== Boron industry ===
Bandırma is the logistics hub for Turkey's boron industry, and it also hosts a lot of the country's boron refining facilities. Raw materials are primarily shipped from the Kırka mine by truck or train, although some also comes from the Emet mine. The refining facilities, which are operated by the state-controlled company Eti Maden, opened in 1967 and currently produce about 400,000 tonnes of refined boron products per year. The refining and logistics facilities are connected to the port of Bandırma, which exports about 900,000 tonnes of boron products per year.

== Transportation ==
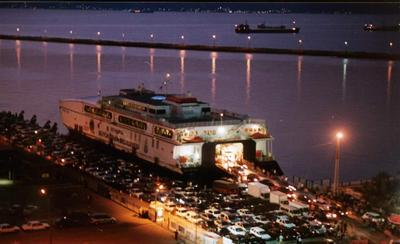
Bandırma Harbour and İDO

Bandırma is one of TCDD's main seaports, therefore the city sees much freight railroad traffic. Two passenger trains also operate from Bandırma to İzmir daily. These being the "6 Eylül Ekspresi", and the "17 Eylül Ekspresi". A new railway project will connect Bandırma with Bursa. İDO also connects Bandırma with Istanbul, via ferry. There is also a ferryboat from Tekirdağ to Bandırma.

== Education ==
There is one public university in Bandırma: Bandırma Onyedi Eylül University.

In 2003 Bandırma Archaeology Museum was founded by, amongst others, Tomris Bakır.

== Population ==
Historical population

Year	Pop.	±% p.a.
1965	55,967	—
1970	62,853	+2.35%
1975	69,680	+2.08%
1980	80,951	+3.04%
1985	93,358	+2.89%
1990	102,300	+1.85%

Year	Pop.	±% p.a.
1997	112,742	+1.40%
2000	120,753	+2.31%
2007	128,603	+0.90%
2012	139,874	+1.69%
2017	152,480	+1.74%
2022	164,965	+1.59%

Source: Population censuses (1965-1997) and TÜIK (2007-2022)

According to the census made on the basis of states in 1893, the population of Bandırma District of Karesi Sanjak is 40,912. Of this population, 20,065 are women and 20,847 are men. Considering the ethnic composition of the population, there are 14,519 Muslim women, 15,473 Muslim men, 2762 Greek women, 2725 Greek men, 2282 Armenian women, 2175 Armenian men, 443 Catholic women, 406 Catholic men, 59 foreign women, 68 foreign men.

According to the year 2000, the total population of Bandırma district is 120,753. Of this population, 59,882 are men and 60,871 are women. The urban population in the district is more than the rural population. 97,419 of the total population live in the city and 23,334 in the countryside. While 48,074 of the population living in the city is male and 49,345 female, this number is 11,808 males and 11,526 females in the villages. There are 204 people per km^{2} in the district.

In the district, 34,490 people are primary school graduates, 3900 people are primary school graduates, 7358 people are secondary school graduates, 404 people are secondary school equivalent vocational high school graduates, 10.067 are high school graduates, 5655 are high school equivalent vocational high school graduates, 7089 are higher education graduates. In the district where 5172 people are illiterate, 1286 of them are men and 3886 of them are women. While the remaining 83,958 people can read and write, 14,930 people in the district have not graduated from any school.

== Twin towns – sister cities ==
Bandırma is twinned with:

- Kamen, Germany since 1999
- Tongxiang, China since 2002
- Cary, United States since 2022

== Gallery ==
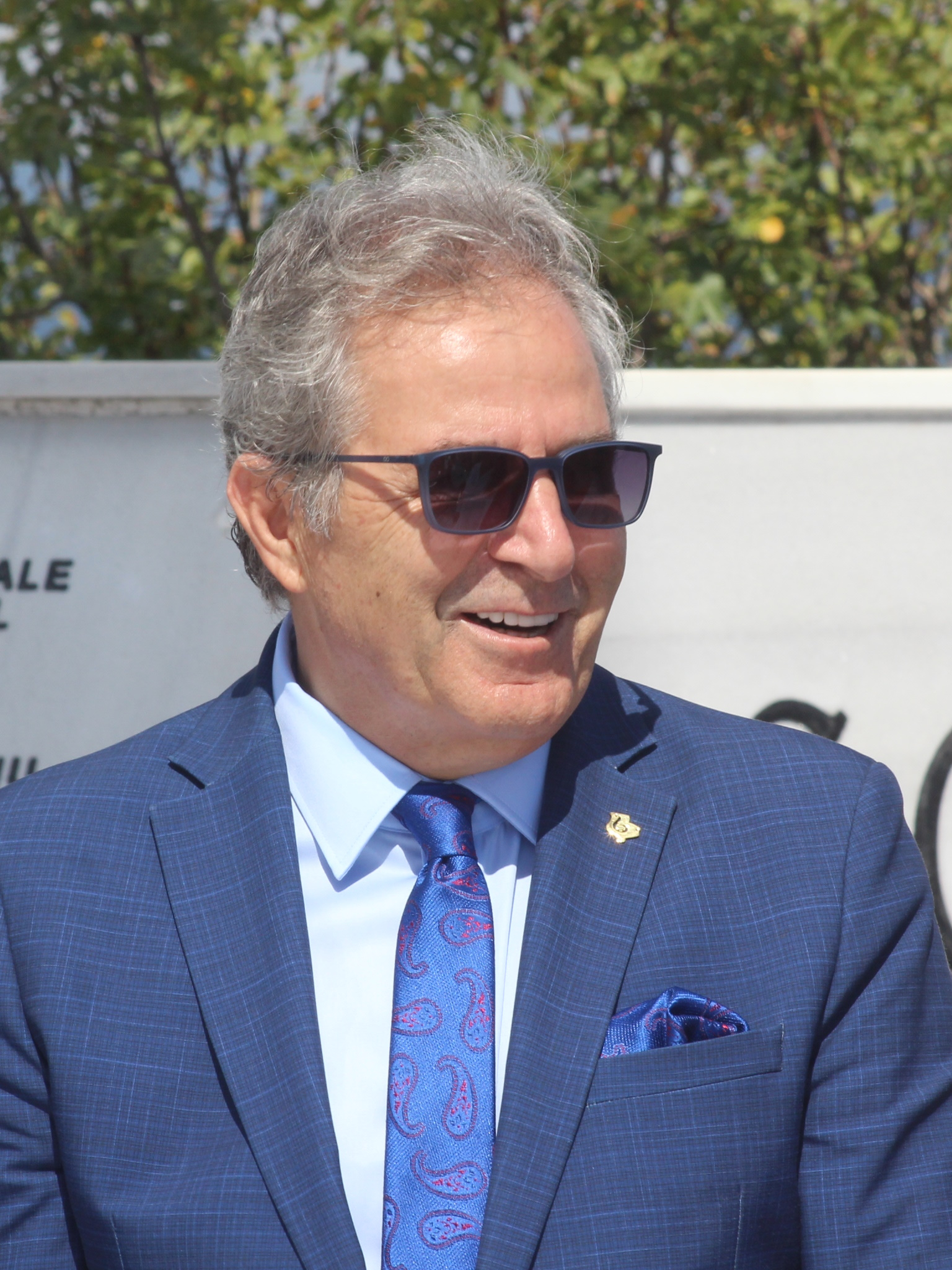
Dursun Mirza, current mayor of Bandırma

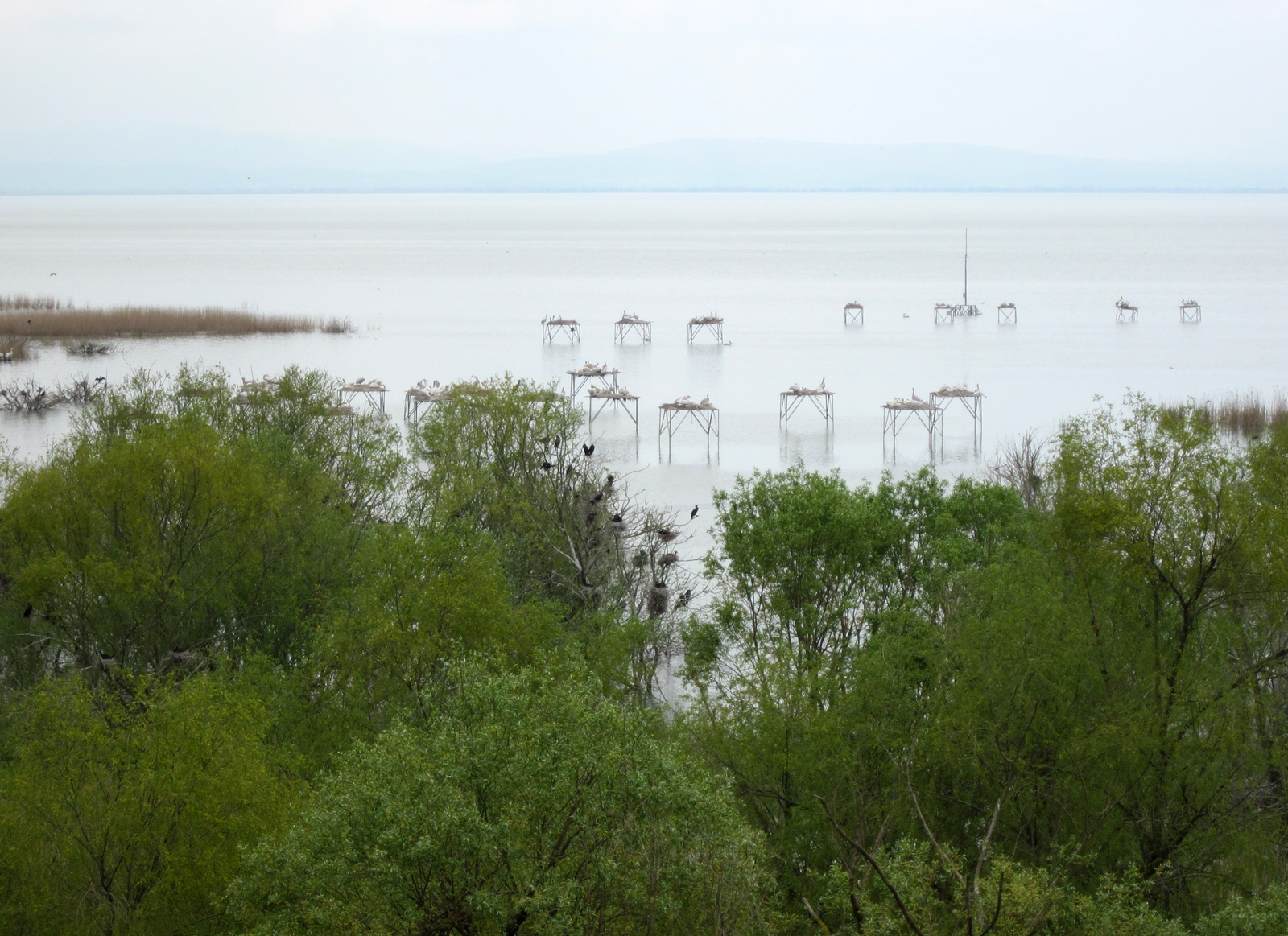
Lake Kuş, Bandırma

== Notable people ==
- Bekir Sami Günsav, Military officer in the Ottoman and Turkish armies
- Ahmet Nuri Öztekin, Military officer in the Ottoman and Turkish armies
- Mehmet Ülkü (1877–1946), businessman and politician
- Ethem Psheu, Ottoman – Circassian partisan leader and fighter in the Turkish War of Independence
- Hande Erçel, actress and model
