= The Last Bullet Monument =

Last bullets of Turkish War of Independence.

Last Bullet Memorial
- Son Kurşun Anıtı
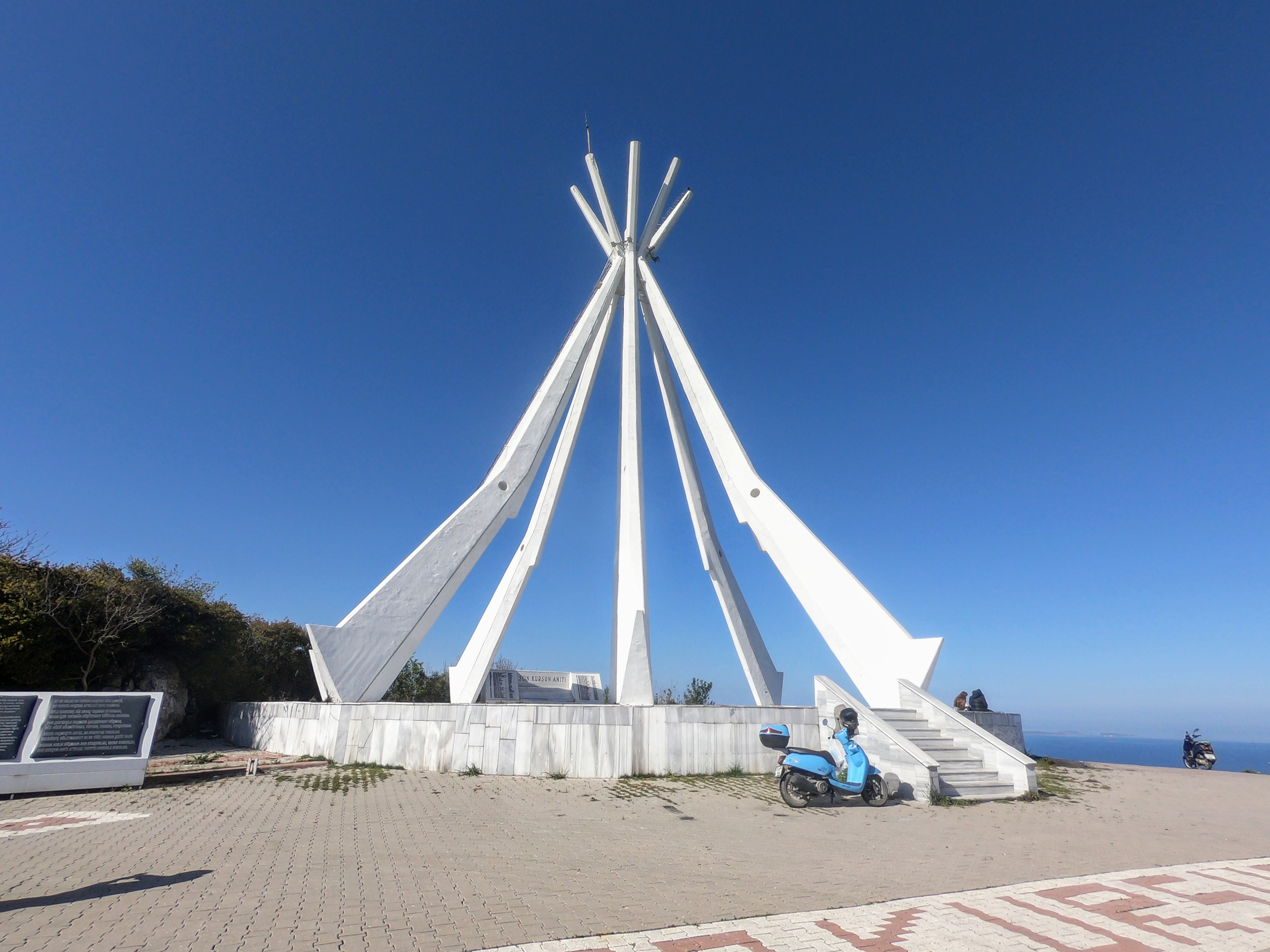
- Interactive map of Last Bullet Memorial
- Location: Çalışkanlar, Bandırma, Balıkesir, Turkey
- Coordinates: 40°21′30″N 27°54′37″E
- Type: War Memorial
- Height: 25 m (82 ft)
- Opening date: 1974
- Dedicated to: Turkish War of Independence

Last Bullet Memorial, located at Bandırma district of Balıkesir represents last bullets of Turkish War of Independence.

== History ==
Last conflict happened at Ayyıldız Tepe and last bullet fired at this place made Turkish victory decisive. 80 soldiers, including Regiment Commander Vecihibey became martyrs here. In 50th anniversary of Republic talks started for a memorial for martyrs of Turkish War of Independence and an association was formed in Bandırma. Prof. Dr. Gündüz Özdeş, a city planner from Istanbul Technical University planned a project and first phase of it, crossed guns memorial part was built with economic help from Bandırma citizens and ministry in 1974. Eight guns represent last bullets fired that showed the victory is represented, won against enemies and guns are no longer needed.
