= Şirinçavuş, Bandırma =

Village in Turkey

Şirinçavuş
- Neighbourhood
- Location in Turkey Şirinçavuş (Marmara)
- Coordinates: 40°18′15″N 27°42′43″E
- Country: Turkey
- Province: Balıkesir
- District: Bandırma
- Population (2022): 168
- Time zone: UTC+3 (TRT)

Şirinçavuş is a neighbourhood in the municipality and district of Bandırma, located in Balıkesir Province, Turkey. As of 2022, the population is 168.
