= Akseki, Tosya =

Village in Turkey

Akseki
- Village
- Location in Turkey
- Coordinates: 41.078°N 34.128°E
- Country: Turkey
- Province: Kastamonu
- District: Tosya
- Population (2021): 87
- Time zone: UTC+3 (TRT)

Akseki is a village in the Tosya District of Kastamonu Province in Turkey. Its population is 87 (2021).
