= Külefli, Bandırma =

Village in Turkey

Külefli
- Neighbourhood
- Location in Turkey Külefli (Marmara)
- Coordinates: 40°15′37″N 27°55′33″E
- Country: Turkey
- Province: Balıkesir
- District: Bandırma
- Population (2022): 312
- Time zone: UTC+3 (TRT)

Külefli is a neighbourhood in the municipality and district of Bandırma, located in Balıkesir Province, Turkey. As of 2022, the population is 312.
