= Dedeoba, Bandırma =

Village in Turkey

Dedeoba
- Neighbourhood
- Location in Turkey Dedeoba (Marmara)
- Coordinates: 40°19′50″N 28°10′30″E
- Country: Turkey
- Province: Balıkesir
- District: Bandırma
- Population (2022): 420
- Time zone: UTC+3 (TRT)

Dedeoba is a neighbourhood in the municipality and district of Bandırma, located in Balıkesir Province, Turkey. As of 2022, the population is 420.
