= Kirazlı, Bandırma =

Village in Turkey

Kirazlı
- Neighbourhood
- Location in Turkey Kirazlı (Marmara)
- Coordinates: 40.195°N 28.115°E
- Country: Turkey
- Province: Balıkesir
- District: Bandırma
- Population (2022): 129
- Time zone: UTC+3 (TRT)

Kirazlı is a neighbourhood in the municipality and district of Bandırma, located in Balıkesir Province, Turkey. As of 2022, the population is 129.
