= Kuşçular, Tosya =

Village in Turkey

Kuşçular
- Village
- Location in Turkey
- Coordinates: 41.000°N 34.168°E
- Country: Turkey
- Province: Kastamonu
- District: Tosya
- Population (2021): 208
- Time zone: UTC+3 (TRT)

Kuşçular is a village in the Tosya District of Kastamonu Province in Turkey. Its population is 208 (2021).
