= Tosya District =

District of Kastamonu Province, Turkey

- District
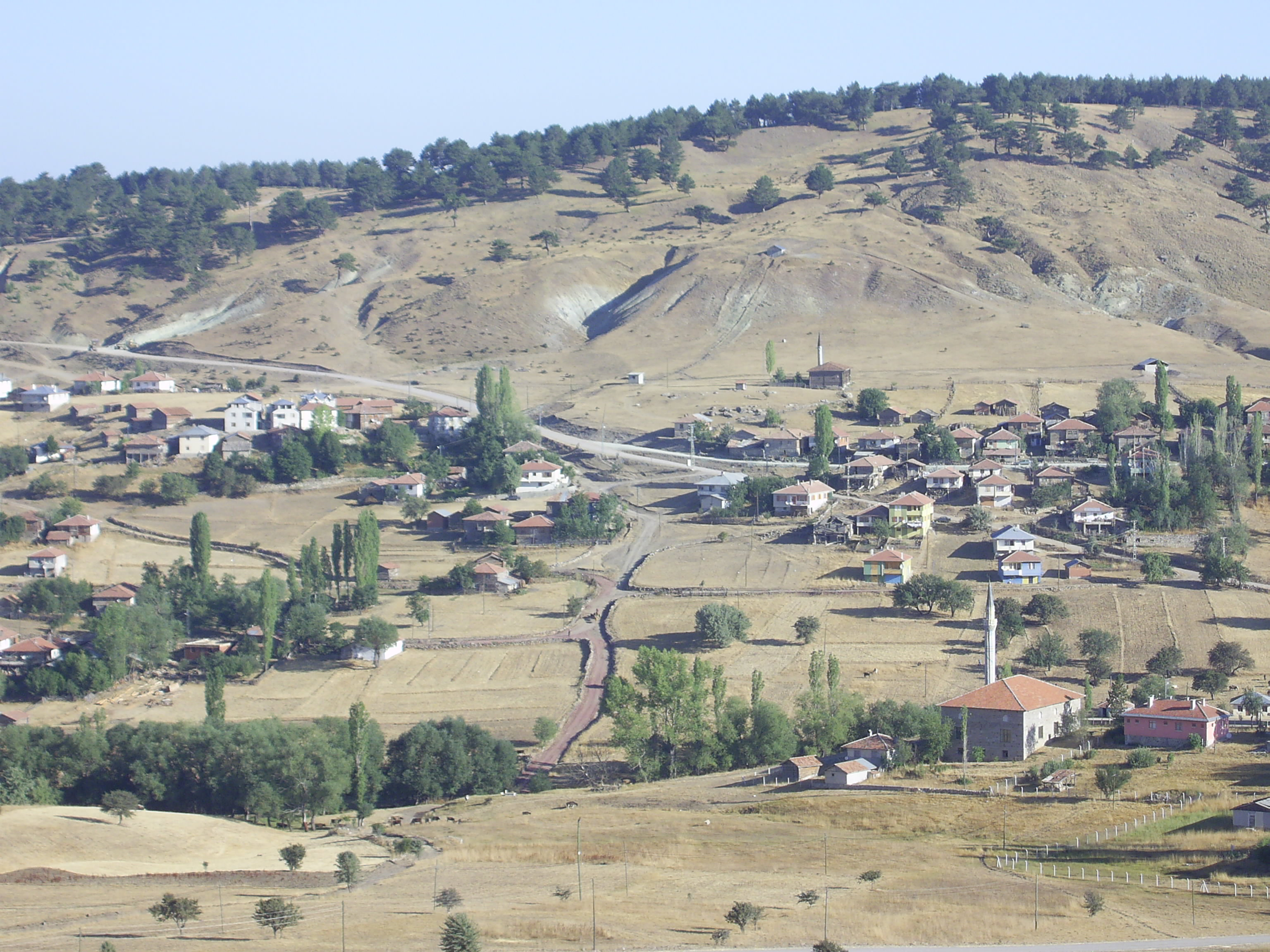
- Kilkuyu village

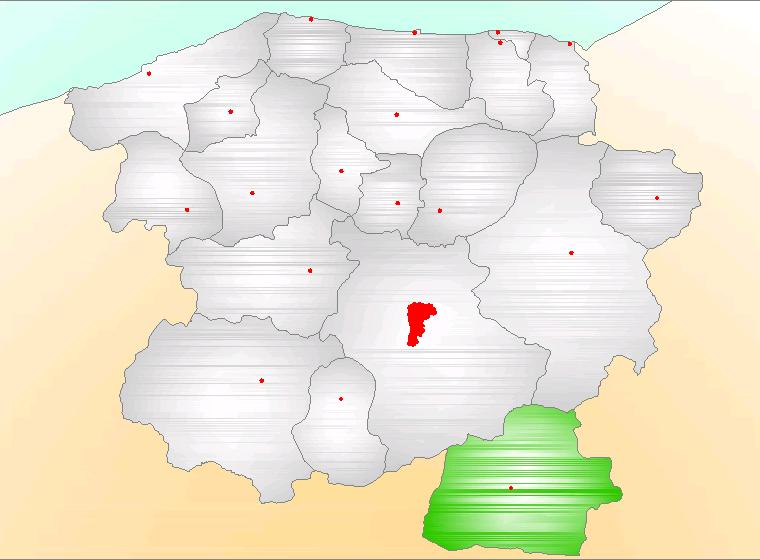
- Map showing Tosya District (green) in Kastamonu Province

- Location within Turkey
- Coordinates: 41°06′N 34°02′E
- Country: Turkey
- Province: Kastamonu
- Seat: Tosya

Government
  - Kaymakam: Suat Hatam
- Area: 1,302 km^{2} (503 sq mi)
- Population (2021): 39,708
  - Density: 30.50/km^{2} (78.99/sq mi)
- Time zone: UTC+3 (TRT)
- Website: www.tosya.gov.tr

Tosya District is a district of the Kastamonu Province of Turkey. Its seat is the town of Tosya. Its area is 1,302 km^{2}, and its population is 39,708 (2021). The district produces a third of Turkey's total rice harvest. Timber is another important industry in Tosya. The area which consists of Tosya and İskilip district of Çorum Province was known as Tarittara or Turmitta during the Hittite era.

== Composition ==
There is one municipality in Tosya District:

- Tosya

There are 54 villages in Tosya District:

- Ahmetoğlu
- Akbük
- Akseki
- Aşağıberçin
- Aşağıdikmen
- Aşağıkayı
- Bayat
- Bürnük
- Çakırlar
- Çaybaşı
- Çaykapı
- Çeltikçi
- Çepni
- Çevlik
- Çifter
- Çukurköy
- Dağardı
- Dağçatağı
- Dedem
- Ekincik
- Ermelik
- Gökçeöz
- Gökomuz
- Gövrecik
- İncebel
- Karabey
- Karaköy
- Karasapaça
- Kargın
- Kayaönü
- Keçeli
- Kınık
- Kızılca
- Kilkuyu
- Kösen
- Küçükkızılca
- Küçüksekiler
- Kuşçular
- Mısmılağaç
- Musaköy
- Ortalıca
- Özboyu
- Sapaca
- Şarakman
- Sekiler
- Sevinçören
- Sofular
- Suluca
- Yağcılar
- Yenidoğan
- Yukarıberçin
- Yukarıdikmen
- Yukarıkayı
- Zincirlikuyu
