= Ömerli, Bandırma =

Village in Turkey

Ömerli
- Neighbourhood
- Location in Turkey Ömerli (Marmara)
- Coordinates: 40.312°N 28.047°E
- Country: Turkey
- Province: Balıkesir
- District: Bandırma
- Population (2022): 5,057
- Time zone: UTC+3 (TRT)

Ömerli is a neighbourhood in the municipality and district of Bandırma, located in Balıkesir Province,Turkey. As of 2022, the population is 5,057.
