= Doğa International Schools =

- Kazafani, Kyrenia, Northern Cyprus

Information
- Type: Private
- Established: 2001
- Principal: Erbil Aydınova
- Grades: Year 1-5, pre-school
- Enrollment: 146 (primary); 100 (pre-school)
- Affiliation: Doğa Schools, Cambridge International School
- Founders: Mark Unwin, Hayran Unwin
- Website: kibrisdoga.com

Doğa International Schools, DIS founded by Mark and Hayran Unwin in 2001, was the first school to offer the English National Curriculum in Northern Cyprus. It is located in Kazafani, Kyrenia.

== Overview ==
DIS was opened under the name of Sunny Lane School in 2001 as an independent primary school with just 12 pupils. It has expanded into a school with both primary and secondary departments, catering for children from two and a half to sixteen years of age; its numbers have risen to around 250 and its teachers to over 25.

On 25 June 2010, the name of the school became The British Academy of Northern Cyprus (BA). Doğa Schools acquired the school in August 2011, naming it Doğa Koleji British Academy (Doğa College British Academy).

The name of the school changed into Doğa International Schools, leaving its Karavas side and moving to Kazafani in 2016.

== Today ==
DIS has 146 primary school students and 100 pre-school students from age 3 to 5.
