= Mahbubeler, Bandırma =

Village in Turkey

Mahbubeler
- Neighbourhood
- Location in Turkey Mahbubeler (Marmara)
- Coordinates: 40°17′36″N 28°07′15″E
- Country: Turkey
- Province: Balıkesir
- District: Bandırma
- Population (2022): 132
- Time zone: UTC+3 (TRT)

Mahbubeler is a neighbourhood in the municipality and district of Bandırma, located in Balıkesir Province, Turkey. As of 2022, the population is 132.
