= Mehmet Ülkü =

Turkish politician

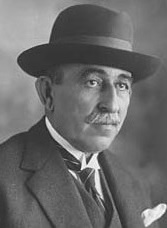

Member of the Grand National Assembly

Personal details
- Born: 1877 Bandırma, Ottoman Empire
- Died: 2 July 1946 (aged 68–69)

Mehmet Ülkü (1877 – 2 July 1946) was a Turkish businessman and politician, who was one of the early industrialists of the Turkish Republic.
