= Bürnük, Tosya =

Village in Turkey

Bürnük
- Village
- Location in Turkey
- Coordinates: 41.155°N 34.061°E
- Country: Turkey
- Province: Kastamonu
- District: Tosya
- Population (2021): 116
- Time zone: UTC+3 (TRT)

Bürnük is a village in the Tosya District of Kastamonu Province in Turkey. Its population is 116 (2021).
