= Sahil Yenice, Bandırma =

Village in Turkey

Yenice
- Neighbourhood
- Location in Turkey Yenice (Marmara)
- Coordinates: 40.387°N 28.115°E
- Country: Turkey
- Province: Balıkesir
- District: Bandırma
- Population (2022): 704
- Time zone: UTC+3 (TRT)

Sahil Yenice is a neighbourhood in the municipality and district of Bandırma, located in Balıkesir Province,Turkey. As of 2022, the population is 704.

Previously known as Yenice, the neighbourhood's name was officially changed to Sahil Yenice in December 2023.
