= Doğruca, Bandırma =

Village in Turkey

Doğruca
- Neighbourhood
- Location in Turkey Doğruca (Marmara)
- Coordinates: 40.277°N 28.028°E
- Country: Turkey
- Province: Balıkesir
- District: Bandırma
- Population (2022): 672
- Time zone: UTC+3 (TRT)

Doğruca is a neighbourhood in the municipality and district of Bandırma, located in Balıkesir province, Turkey. As of 2022, the population is 672.
