= Yeniyenice, Bandırma =

Village in Turkey

Yeniyenice
- Neighbourhood
- Location within Turkey Location within Marmara
- Coordinates: 40°16′28″N 28°09′13″E
- Country: Turkey
- Province: Balıkesir
- District: Bandırma
- Population (2026): 566
- Time zone: UTC+3 (TRT)

Yeniyenice is a neighbourhood in the municipality and district of Bandırma, located in Balıkesir Province, Turkey. As of 2026, the population is 566.

== History ==
The origins of Yeniyenice are believed to date back to 1420-1430. While multiple theories exist regarding its establishment, the most widely accepted account suggests that a man named Kocabey settled in the area with his family. Initially founded as a farm, the settlement gradually expanded, eventually becoming a village during the Early Ottoman Era.
