= Orhaniye, Bandırma =

Village in Turkey

Orhaniye
- Neighbourhood
- Location in Turkey Orhaniye (Marmara)
- Coordinates: 40°14′48″N 27°50′34″E
- Country: Turkey
- Province: Balıkesir
- District: Bandırma
- Population (2022): 210
- Time zone: UTC+3 (TRT)

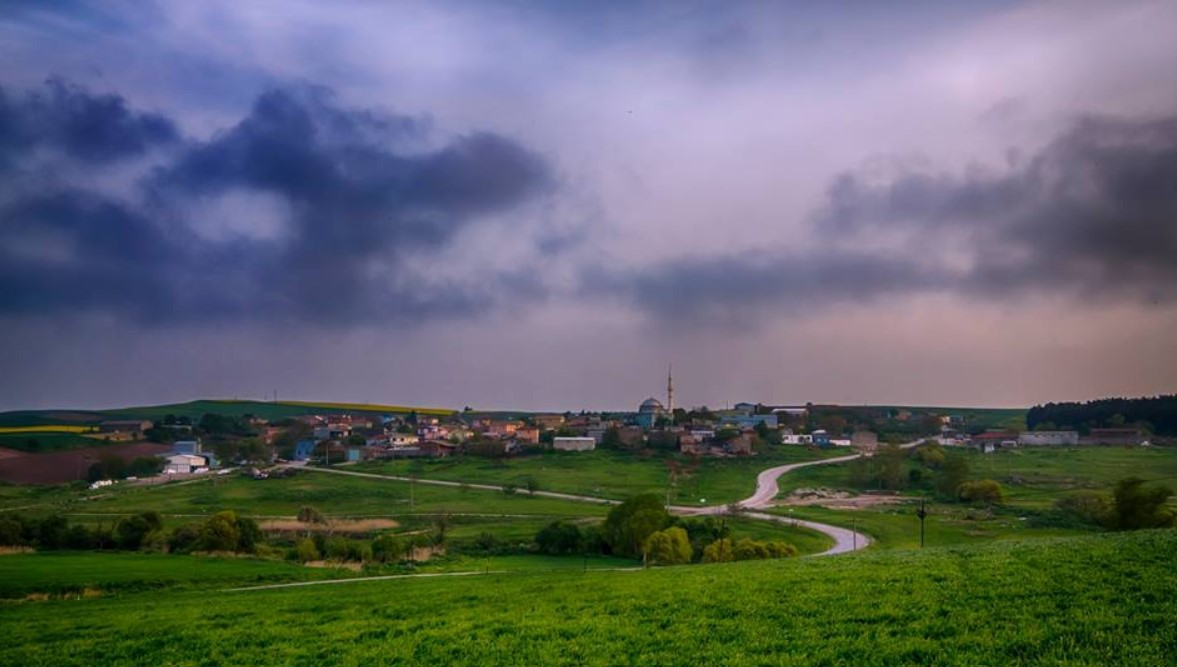

Orhaniye is a neighbourhood in the municipality and district of Bandırma, located in Balıkesir Province, Turkey. As of 2022, the population is 210.
