= Doğanpınar, Bandırma =

Village in Turkey

Doğanpınar
- Neighbourhood
- Location in Turkey Doğanpınar (Marmara)
- Coordinates: 40.297°N 27.895°E
- Country: Turkey
- Province: Balıkesir
- District: Bandırma
- Population (2022): 293
- Time zone: UTC+3 (TRT)

Doğanpınar is a neighbourhood in the municipality and district of Bandırma, located in Balıkesir Province, Turkey. As of 2022, the population is 293.
