= Çaykapı, Tosya =

Village in Turkey

Çaykapı
- Village
- Location in Turkey
- Coordinates: 41°01′23″N 34°08′57″E
- Country: Turkey
- Province: Kastamonu
- District: Tosya
- Population (2021): 167
- Time zone: UTC+3 (TRT)

Çaykapı is a village in the Tosya District of Kastamonu Province in Turkey. Its population is 167 (2021).
