= Kınık, Tosya =

Village in Turkey

Kınık
- Village
- Location in Turkey
- Coordinates: 40°55′55″N 34°02′26″E
- Country: Turkey
- Province: Kastamonu
- District: Tosya
- Population (2021): 89
- Time zone: UTC+3 (TRT)

Kınık is a village in the Tosya District of Kastamonu Province in Turkey. Its population is 89 (2021).
