= Tomris Bakır =

Turkish classical archaeologist (1941–2020)

- Born: Tomris Akbaşoğlu; 5 November 1941
- Died: 25 February 2020 (aged 78)
- Citizenship: Turkey
- Occupation: Archaeologist
- Known for: Director of Excavations at Daskyleion

Academic background
- Education: Heidelberg University
- Thesis: Der Kolonnettenkrater in Korinth und Attika (1974)
- Doctoral advisor: Roland Hampe

Academic work
- Discipline: Classical archaeology

Tomris Bakır (5 November 1941 - 25 February 2020) was a classical archaeologist from Turkey, who specialised in ceramics, and was the Director of Excavations at Daskyleion.

== Biography ==
Tomris Akbaşoğlu was born on 5 November 1941. She studied at Ankara University, where she obtained her undergraduate degree. She was awarded a doctoral degree at the Archaeological Institute of Heidelberg University, doctoral advisor was Roland Hampe. She was married to the archaeologist Güven Bakır (de).

From 1977, after returning to Turkey, Bakır taught as Assistant Professor at Ataturk University in Erzurum. In 1988 she was appointed Professor at Ege University in Izmir, where she worked until her retirement in 2010. From 1988 to 2010 she was the Director of the Excavations in Daskyleion. In particular, Bakır's excavations focused on the residence of the Persian satrap at the site. During her time running excavations at the site, a building interpreted as a Zoroastrian temple was excavated. Significant finds that were excavated from other site contexts under her directorship, included: two seals and one bulla; imported amphoras; as well as many sherds of pottery. She was instrumental in the foundation of Bandırma Archaeology Museum in 2003. In addition, she was an internationally respected researcher: she was a member of the German Archaeological Institute (DAI), as well as other organisations.

Bakır died on 25 February 2020 and her body was interred at Yakaköy Cemetery on 26 February, following prayer at Güven Mosque.

== Reception ==
Bakır's work on Corinthian column-kraters, Der Kolonnettenkrater in Korinth und Attika, was described as a "methodical and painstaking examination" of the pottery. At her death, the Turkish Ministry of Culture and Tourism described her as an "esteemed teacher, who introduced Daskyleion Ancient City to the world [and] opened new horizons in Turkish Archaeology".

== Selected publications ==
- Der Kolonnettenkrater in Korinth und Attika zwischen 625 und 550 v. Chr (Triltsch, Würzburg 1974).
- Korinth seramiğinde aslan figürünün gelişimi (Ege Üniversitesi Sosyal Bilimler Fakültesi, Izmir 1982).
- 'Archäologische Beobachtungen über die Residenz in Daskyleion', Pallas. Revue d’études antiques (1995).
- Herausgeberin mit Heleen Sancisi-Weerdenburg: Achaemenid Anatolia. Proceedings of the First International Symposium on Anatolia in the Achaemenid Period, Bandirma, 15–18 August 1997 (Nederlands Instituut voor het Nabije Oosten, Leiden 2001).
- Daskyleion (Balıkesir Valiliği, Balıkesir 2011).
