= Çarıkköy, Bandırma =

Village in Turkey

Çarıkköy
- Neighbourhood
- Location in Turkey Çarıkköy (Marmara)
- Coordinates: 40.265°N 27.833°E
- Country: Turkey
- Province: Balıkesir
- District: Bandırma
- Population (2022): 147
- Time zone: UTC+3 (TRT)

Çarıkköy is a neighbourhood in the municipality and district of Bandırma, located in Balıkesir province, Turkey. As of 2022, the population is 147.
