= Çakılköy, Bandırma =

Village in Turkey

Çakılköy
- Neighbourhood
- Location within Turkey Location within Marmara
- Coordinates: 40.339°N 28.128°E
- Country: Turkey
- Province: Balıkesir
- District: Bandırma
- Population (2022): 265
- Time zone: UTC+3 (TRT)

Çakılköy is a neighbourhood in the municipality and district of Bandırma, located in Balıkesir Province, Turkey. As of 2022, the population is 265.
