= Tosya =

- Municipality
- Coat of arms

- Location within Turkey
- Coordinates: 41°01′2″N 34°02′18″E
- Country: Turkey
- Province: Kastamonu
- District: Tosya

Government
  - Mayor: Volkan Kavaklıgil (MHP)
- Elevation: 880 m (2,890 ft)
- Population (2021): 28,963
- Time zone: UTC+3 (TRT)
- Postal code: 37300
- Area code: 0366
- Climate: Cfa
- Website: tosya.bel.tr

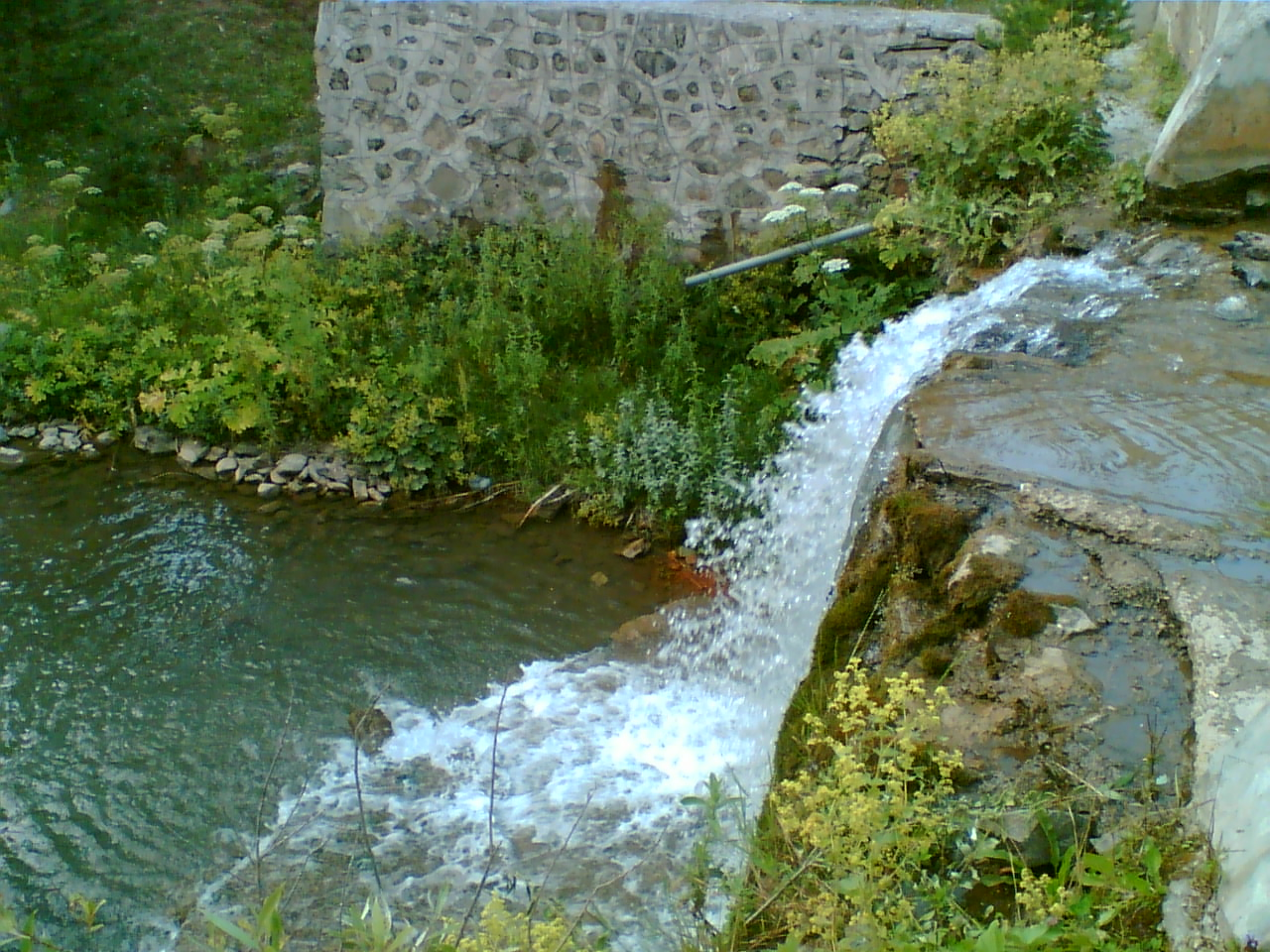
Cukurhan.jpg

Tosya (Ottoman Turkish: طوسيه), previously called Theodosia (Greek: Θεοδοσία) or Doceia (Greek: Δοκεία) under the Byzantine Empire, is a town in Kastamonu Province in the Black Sea region of Turkey. It is the seat of Tosya District. Its population is 28,963 (2021). It is the home town of the famous Boyner family and the birthplace of Markos Vafeiadis (1906–1992), a famous Greek politician and Hasan Riza Pasha,(1817- 1913) a Turkish commander during the Siege of Scutari

The North Anatolian Fault is located in this area. This caused a major earthquake in 1943.

== Climate ==
Climate data for Tosya(1991-2020)
Month	Jan	Feb	Mar	Apr	May	Jun	Jul	Aug	Sep	Oct	Nov	Dec	Year
Mean daily maximum °C (°F)	3.4 (38.1)	6.3 (43.3)	11.2 (52.2)	16.5 (61.7)	21.5 (70.7)	25.7 (78.3)	29.2 (84.6)	29.5 (85.1)	24.9 (76.8)	18.6 (65.5)	10.9 (51.6)	5.1 (41.2)	16.9 (62.4)
Daily mean °C (°F)	0.1 (32.2)	2.1 (35.8)	6 (43)	10.8 (51.4)	15.5 (59.9)	19.2 (66.6)	22.3 (72.1)	22.5 (72.5)	18.4 (65.1)	13.4 (56.1)	6.8 (44.2)	1.9 (35.4)	11.6 (52.9)
Mean daily minimum °C (°F)	−2.4 (27.7)	−1.2 (29.8)	1.8 (35.2)	5.9 (42.6)	10.2 (50.4)	13.5 (56.3)	15.9 (60.6)	16.2 (61.2)	12.8 (55.0)	9 (48)	3.4 (38.1)	−0.6 (30.9)	7.0 (44.7)
Average precipitation mm (inches)	43.22 (1.70)	34.26 (1.35)	40.91 (1.61)	46.31 (1.82)	57.51 (2.26)	56.22 (2.21)	27.01 (1.06)	25.35 (1.00)	27.61 (1.09)	35.22 (1.39)	27.76 (1.09)	47.67 (1.88)	469.05 (18.46)
Average precipitation days (≥ 1 mm)	7	5.9	7.1	8	9.3	8	3.8	3.7	3.7	5.5	4.9	7.2	74.1
Average relative humidity (%)	77.9	70	63	59.5	61.4	60.3	53.9	53.7	55.8	63.5	68.4	79	63.9
Source: NOAA NCEI
