= Çinge, Bandırma =

Village in Turkey

Çinge
- Neighbourhood
- Location in Turkey Çinge (Marmara)
- Coordinates: 40.303°N 27.870°E
- Country: Turkey
- Province: Balıkesir
- District: Bandırma
- Population (2022): 44
- Time zone: UTC+3 (TRT)

Çinge is a neighbourhood in the municipality and district of Bandırma, located in Balıkesir Province, Turkey. As of 2022, the population is 44.
