= Emre, Bandırma =

Village in Turkey

Emre
- Neighbourhood
- Location in Turkey Emre (Marmara)
- Coordinates: 40.315°N 28.1547°E
- Country: Turkey
- Province: Balıkesir
- District: Bandırma
- Population (2022): 226
- Time zone: UTC+3 (TRT)

Emre is a neighbourhood in the municipality and district of Bandırma, located in Balıkesir Province, Turkey. As of 2022, the population is 226.
