= Kuşcenneti, Bandırma =

Village in Turkey

Kuşcenneti
- Neighbourhood
- Location in Turkey Kuşcenneti (Marmara)
- Coordinates: 40°13′45″N 28°03′15″E
- Country: Turkey
- Province: Balıkesir
- District: Bandırma
- Population (2022): 469
- Time zone: UTC+3 (TRT)

Kuşcenneti is a neighbourhood in the municipality and district of Bandırma, located in Balıkesir Province, Turkey. As of 2022, the population is 469.
