= Gölyaka, Bandırma =

Village in Turkey

Gölyaka
- Neighbourhood
- Location in Turkey Gölyaka (Marmara)
- Coordinates: 40°11′04″N 27°52′15″E
- Country: Turkey
- Province: Balıkesir
- District: Bandırma
- Population (2022): 229
- Time zone: UTC+3 (TRT)

Gölyaka is a neighbourhood in the municipality and district of Bandırma, located in Balıkesir Province, Turkey. As of 2022, the population is 229.
