= Erten Gazi =

Turkish basketball player (born 1997)

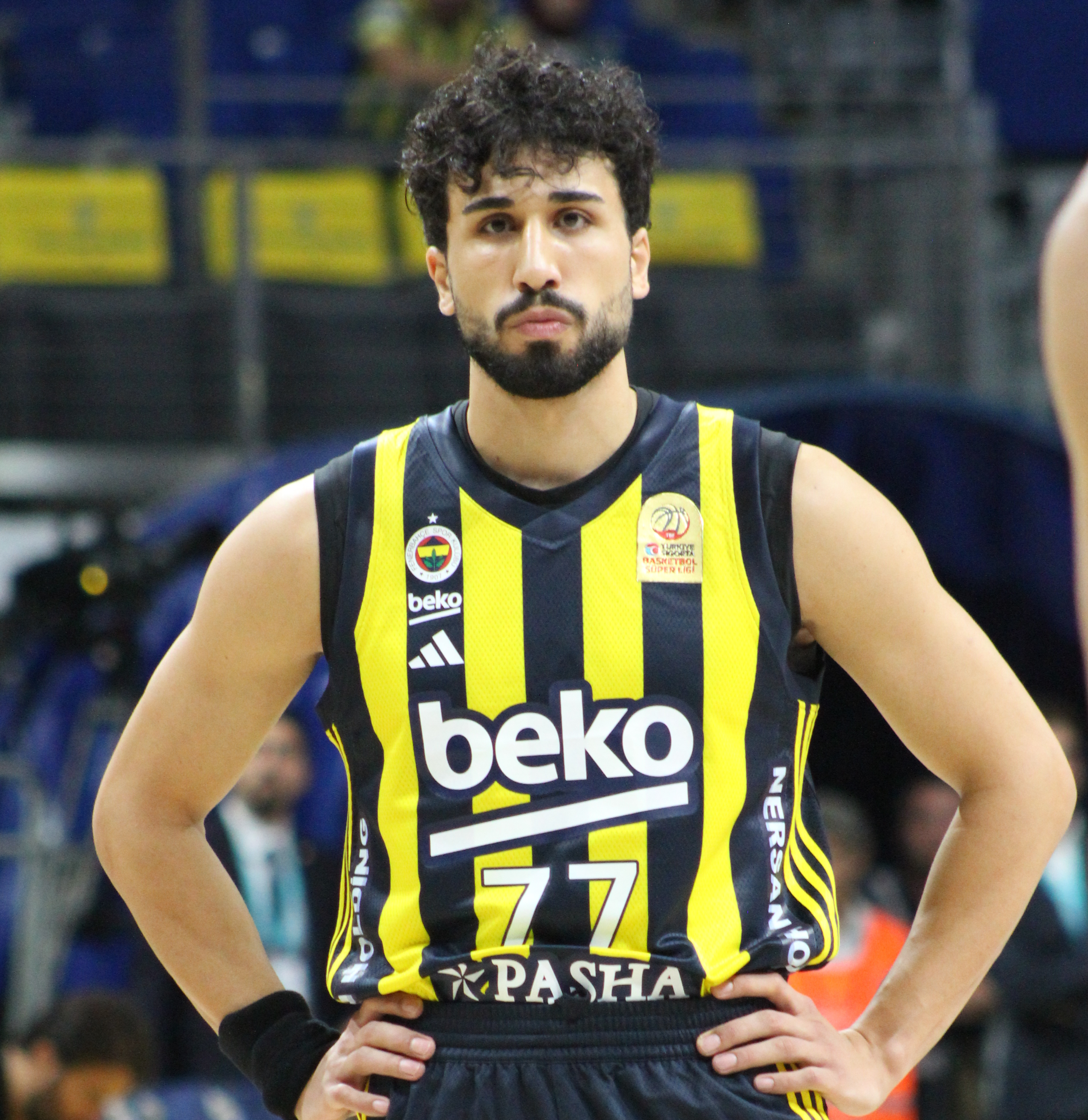

No. 11 – Denizli Basket
- Position: Shooting guard
- League: BSL

Personal information
- Born: June 15, 1997 (age 29) Nicosia, Cyprus
- Listed height: 6 ft 3 in (1.91 m)
- Listed weight: 205 lb (93 kg)

Career information
- High school: Güzelyurt Türk Maarif Koleji (Morphou); Bostancı Doğa Koleji (Ataşehir, Istanbul)
- College: DePaul (2015–2017); Fordham (2018–2020)
- NBA draft: 2020: undrafted
- Playing career: 2013–present

Career history
- 2013–2024: Anadolu Efes
- 2013–2015: →Pertevniyal
- 2024: Fenerbahçe
- 2024–2025: Dinamo Sassari
- 2025–2026: Esenler Erokspor
- 2026–present: Denizli Basket

Career highlights
- 2× EuroLeague champion (2021, 2022); 2× Turkish League champion (2021, 2023); Turkish Cup winner (2022); Turkish Super Cup winner (2022)
- Stats at Basketball Reference
Medals
Men's basketball
Representing Turkey
European U-18 Championship
Silver medal – second place	2015 Greece	Team

Erten Gazi (born June 15, 1997) is a Turkish Cypriot professional basketball player who plays for Denizli Basket of the Basketbol Süper Ligi (BSL).

== Early life ==
Erten Gazi was born in North Nicosia to Turkish Cypriot parents Ayten (née Zabit) and Uğur Gazi. Ayten Gazi was a former track and field athlete from Paphos while Uğur Gazi was a volleyball player from Gazimağusa. Erten grew up in Güzelyurt. He started playing basketball in 2004 for Güzelyurt Basketbol İhtisas Spor Derneği, coached by his parents. Gazi scored 48 points for his club in the final game of North Cyprus national U14 championship in 2011, losing the game 80–59. He won the national U16 championship in 2012. He attended Şehit Turgut Ortaokulu from 2008 to 2011, receiving national third place in 2009 and championship in 2010. Gazi enrolled Güzelyurt Türk Maarif Koleji upon achieving fifth-place in the entrance examination. During his freshman year he led his team to the national high schools' final game, where they lost and ended in second place.

In 2012, he moved to Istanbul since he was signed by Anadolu Efes to play for their U16 and U18 teams. He won the Turkish national U16 championship in 2013 with Efes. He was assigned to Pertevniyal, Efes' feeder club. He won the Turkish national U18 championship in 2014 with Pertevniyal. He played high schools' basketball with Bostancı Doğa Koleji. He led his team to the high schools' city (Istanbul) championship, the national (Turkey) championship and the World Championship in his senior year. Gazi committed to DePaul University to play college basketball in the United States.

== College career ==
Gazi started five games and appeared in 30 in his freshman season, averaging 2.2 points in 14.6 minutes per game for Blue Demons. However, after only appearing in 13 games and averaging 1.4 points in 4.2 minutes per game in his sophomore season he left the program. He transferred to Fordham University and sat out the 2017–18 season as per the NCAA rules.

He was injured twice in his redshirt junior season playing only in five games and starting in two, averaging 5.2 points in 16.8 minutes per game for Rams. Gazi played in 22 games and started in 16, averaging 8.9 points in 25.3 minutes during his senior year. His team reached to the second round of the 2020 Atlantic 10 men's basketball tournament, but the season was concluded at that point due to the COVID-19 pandemic.

== Professional career ==
Gazi made his professional debut with Pertevniyal in Turkish Basketball First League (TBL) during the 2013–2014 season, playing against Maliye Milli Piyango. In 2014, he was named to the Anadolu Efes training camp roster in Slovenia. He made his debut for Efes' first team aged 16, playing in the friendly game against Olimpija. He scored his first points against Zlatorog Laško. He moved back to Pertevniyal and played in the 2014–2015 TBL season.

Upon his graduation from college, Gazi returned to Efes on 6 August 2020. He made his Basketbol Süper Ligi (BSL) debut on 26 September 2020, against Galatasaray. He had his first start in third game, recording 14 points in 21 minutes against Ormanspor on 10 October 2020 as his personal record in BSL. He made his EuroLeague debut on 13 October 2020 against Alba Berlin. On 5 November 2020, he received his first start in a EuroLeague game against Maccabi Tel Aviv. He played in 22 games to help Efes finish 2020–21 BSL regular season with top record, winning 29 out of 30 games. On June 26, 2023, Gazi renewed his contract with Efes for another two years.

On July 1, 2024, he signed with Fenerbahçe Beko of the Turkish Basketbol Süper Ligi (BSL).

On December 25, 2024, he signed with Dinamo Sassari of the Lega Basket Serie A (LBA).

On July 12, 2025, he signed with Esenler Erokspor of the Basketbol Süper Ligi (BSL).

On August 9, 2026, he signed with Yukatel Denizli Basket of the Basketbol Süper Ligi (BSL).

== International career ==
Gazi has chosen to represent Turkey on the international level. He played for the under 16, and the under 18 national teams. He received the silver medal in 2015 FIBA Europe Under-18 Championship, where he played in all 9 games, averaging 5.6 points and 2.8 rebounds in 18.7 minutes per game, while starting in the final game. He also represented Turkey in 2013 FIBA Europe Under-16 Championship, finishing in the seventh place. Gazi was called up to the national B team for their training camp in August 2021.

== Personal life ==
Gazi was elected as a member of the first term of the Turkish Cypriot Youth Senate following elections held under the auspices of the Turkish Cypriot Youth Federation. The Senate is composed of selected young representatives from diverse sectors and backgrounds, both domestically and abroad, representing the Turkish Cypriot community.

== Career statistics ==
Legend
GP	Games played	GS	Games started	MPG	Minutes per game
FG%	Field-goal percentage	3P%	3-point field-goal percentage	FT%	Free-throw percentage
RPG	Rebounds per game	APG	Assists per game	SPG	Steals per game
BPG	Blocks per game	PPG	Points per game	PIR	Performance index rating
**Bold**	Career high

=== EuroLeague ===
†	Denotes seasons in which Gazi won the EuroLeague

Year	Team	GP	GS	MPG	FG%	3P%	FT%	RPG	APG	SPG	BPG	PPG	PIR
2020–21†	Anadolu Efes	9	1	5.4	**.417**	**.375**	.500	**.7**	**.6**	.2	—	**1.6**	**1.3**
2021–22†	Anadolu Efes	**14**	0	4.9	.222	.200	.500	.4	.4	.1	—	.5	-0.2
2022–23	Anadolu Efes	11	1	4.6	.182	.000	**.800**	**.7**	.1	**.3**	—	.7	0.1
2023–24	Anadolu Efes	10	**3**	**8.7**	.130	.059	.500	.5	.4	.1	—	.9	-0.4
Career		44	5	5.8	.218	.135	.600	.5	.3	.2	—	.9	-0.1

=== Domestic leagues ===
Year	Team	League	GP	MPG	FG%	3P%	FT%	RPG	APG	SPG	BPG	PPG
2013–14	(Turkey) Pertevniyal	TB2L	6	5.6	.500	1.000	1.000	.2	—	—	—	0.8
2014–15	(Turkey) Pertevniyal	TB2L	25	14.6	.413	.381	.607	1.2	.6	.6	.3	4.4
2020–21	(Turkey) Anadolu Efes	TBSL	28	11.2	.477	.447	.900	1.4	.8	.5	.1	4.2
2021–22	(Turkey) Anadolu Efes	TBSL	38	13.6	.400	.390	.800	1.8	.7	.4	.1	5.1
2022–23	(Turkey) Anadolu Efes	TBSL	28	8.0	.472	.486	.500	.5	.4	.2	—	2.5
2023–24	(Turkey) Anadolu Efes	TBSL	16	21.4	.485	.413	.846	1.6	.8	.7	.2	8.3

=== College ===
Year	Team	GP	GS	MPG	FG%	3P%	FT%	RPG	APG	SPG	BPG	PPG
2015–16	DePaul	**30**	5	14.6	.446	.174	**.688**	1.3	**1.2**	.3	.1	2.2
2016–17	DePaul	13	0	4.2	**.667**	**.500**	**1.000**	.9	.2	.1	—	1.4
2018–19	Fordham	5	2	16.8	.500	.222	—	2.4	.6	.6	—	5.2
2019–20	Fordham	22	**16**	**25.3**	.454	.372	.625	**3.0**	1.1	**.8**	**.3**	**8.9**
Career		70	23	16.2	.464	.328	.682	1.8	.9	.4	.1	4.3
