= Mısmılağaç, Tosya =

Village in Turkey

Mısmılağaç
- Village
- Location in Turkey
- Coordinates: 40.883°N 34.229°E
- Country: Turkey
- Province: Kastamonu
- District: Tosya
- Population (2021): 72
- Time zone: UTC+3 (TRT)

Mısmılağaç is a village in the Tosya District of Kastamonu Province in Turkey. Its population is 72 (2021).
