= Yeniziraatli, Bandırma =

Village in Turkey

Yeniziraatli
- Neighbourhood
- Location in Turkey Yeniziraatli (Marmara)
- Coordinates: 40°18′18″N 28°05′27″E
- Country: Turkey
- Province: Balıkesir
- District: Bandırma
- Population (2022): 145
- Time zone: UTC+3 (TRT)

Yeniziraatli is a neighbourhood in the municipality and district of Bandırma, located in Balıkesir Province, Turkey. As of 2022, the population is 145.
