= Eskiziraatli, Bandırma =

Village in Turkey

Eskiziraatli
- Neighbourhood
- Location in Turkey Eskiziraatli (Marmara)
- Coordinates: 40°17′57″N 28°04′32″E
- Country: Turkey
- Province: Balıkesir
- District: Bandırma
- Population (2022): 155
- Time zone: UTC+3 (TRT)

Eskiziraatli is a neighbourhood in the municipality and district of Bandırma, located in Balıkesir Province, Turkey. As of 2022, the population is 155.
