= Ekincik, Tosya =

Village in Turkey

Ekincik
- Village
- Location in Turkey
- Coordinates: 41.076°N 34.010°E
- Country: Turkey
- Province: Kastamonu
- District: Tosya
- Population (2021): 389
- Time zone: UTC+3 (TRT)

Ekincik is a village in the Tosya District of Kastamonu Province in Turkey. Its population is 389 (2021).
