= Beyköy, Bandırma =

Village in Turkey

Beyköy
- Neighbourhood
- Location in Turkey Beyköy (Marmara)
- Coordinates: 40.247°N 27.806°E
- Country: Turkey
- Province: Balıkesir
- District: Bandırma
- Population (2022): 94
- Time zone: UTC+3 (TRT)

Beyköy is a neighbourhood in the municipality and district of Bandırma, located in Balıkesir Province, Turkey. As of 2022, the population is 94.
