= Hıdırköy, Bandırma =

Village in Turkey

Hıdırköy
- Neighbourhood
- Location in Turkey Hıdırköy (Marmara)
- Coordinates: 40.309°N 27.806°E
- Country: Turkey
- Province: Balıkesir
- District: Bandırma
- Population (2022): 140
- Time zone: UTC+3 (TRT)

Hıdırköy is a neighbourhood in the municipality and district of Bandırma, located in Balıkesir Province, Turkey. As of 2022, the population is 140.
