= Doğa (name) =

- Gender: Unisex
- Language: Turkish

Origin
- Language: Turkic
- Meaning: Nature

Doğa is a common unisex Turkish given name. In Turkish, "Doğa" means "nature".

== People ==
- Doğa Bekleriz (born 1977), Turkish model
- Doğa Rutkay (born 1978), Turkish actress
