= Sekiler, Tosya =

Village in Turkey

Sekiler
- Village
- Location in Turkey
- Coordinates: 40.909°N 34.034°E
- Country: Turkey
- Province: Kastamonu
- District: Tosya
- Population (2021): 349
- Time zone: UTC+3 (TRT)

Sekiler is a village in the Tosya District of Kastamonu Province in Turkey. Its population is 349 (2021).
