= Çepni, Bandırma =

Village in Turkey

Çepni
- Neighbourhood
- Location in Turkey Çepni (Marmara)
- Coordinates: 40.233°N 27.881°E
- Country: Turkey
- Province: Balıkesir
- District: Bandırma
- Population (2022): 194
- Time zone: UTC+3 (TRT)

Çepni is a neighbourhood in the municipality and district of Bandırma, located in Balıkesir Province, Turkey. As of 2022, the population is 194.
