= Çepni, Tosya =

Village in Turkey

Çepni
- Village
- Location in Turkey
- Coordinates: 40.921°N 33.962°E
- Country: Turkey
- Province: Kastamonu
- District: Tosya
- Population (2021): 240
- Time zone: UTC+3 (TRT)

Çepni is a village in the Tosya District of Kastamonu Province in Turkey. Its population is 240 (2021).
