= Ərikli =

- Location within Azerbaijan Location within East Zangezur Economic Region
- Coordinates: 39°51′02″N 46°24′18″E
- Country: Azerbaijan
- District: Lachin

Population (2015)
  - Total: 12
- Time zone: UTC+4 (AZT)

Ərikli (Arikli) or Arakhish (Armenian: Արախիշ) is a village in the Lachin District of Azerbaijan.

== History ==
The village was located in the Armenian-occupied territories surrounding Nagorno-Karabakh, coming under the control of ethnic Armenian forces during the First Nagorno-Karabakh War in the early 1990s. The village subsequently became part of the breakaway Republic of Artsakh as part of its Kashatagh Province, where it was known as Arakhish (Armenian: Արախիշ). It was returned to Azerbaijan as part of the 2020 Nagorno-Karabakh ceasefire agreement.

== Historical heritage sites ==
Historical heritage sites in and around the village include khachkars from between the 9th and 11th centuries, two cemeteries from between the 9th and 17th centuries, a 12th-century tombstone, the 12th/13th-century church of Arakhish (Արախիշ), the church of Zorakhach (Armenian: Զորախաչ) from 1246, a tombstone from 1295, a 15th/16th-century rock-cut khachkar, a 16th/17th-century khachkar, and two 17th-century tombstones.

== Demographics ==
The village had 50 inhabitants in 2005, and 12 inhabitants in 2015.
