= Kırka mine =

Boron mine in Turkey

Coordinates: 39.295742°N 30.493194°E

- Interactive map of Kırka mine
- Location: Kırka, Eskişehir, Turkey
- Products: Boron

The Kırka mine is a large boron ore mine located at Eskişehir Province in western Turkey. Kırka represents one of the largest boron reserves in Turkey having an estimated reserve of 750.6 million tonnes of ore grading 28% boron. This is mainly in the form of tincal, although other borate minerals are present in smaller amounts. The Kırka deposit is the single largest tincal deposit in the world, accounting for 18% of the world's total reserves. It produces 2.5 megatonnes of ore per year and its reserves expected to last for another 300 years at current rates.

The Kırka mine is managed by the state-controlled company Eti Maden. It was established in 1970. An on-site refinery was added in 1984, producing about 840,000 tonnes of borax pentahydrate annually, mostly for use in cleaning products. The mining and refining facilities at Kırka employ a total of over 2,000 people.
