= Doğa Bekleriz =

Turkish actress and model (born 1997)

Doğa Bekleriz (born 28 November 1977, Istanbul) is a Turkish model, actress, and TV presenter. She also started a singing career with a group named Adrenalin, formed with two other Turkish models, Gizem Özdilli and Nigar Talibova.

== Biography ==
Bekleriz made her first public appearances in 1996 and 1998, where she took part in two successive modelling competitions, organized by the Star TV and ATV TV channels respectively. She, since early 2005, has been modelling for brand-names in Turkey. She also played supporting roles in several TV series.

Bekleriz married Yusuf Berat Komşu in 2016 and settled in Mersin.

== Filmography ==
- 1998 - Aynalı Tahir (TV series)
- 2001 - 90-60-90 (TV series)
- 2002 - İki Arada (TV series)
- 2005 - Kızma Birader (TV series)
- 2007 - Amerikalılar Karadeniz'de
