= Eti Maden =

Turkish mining and chemical company

- Native name: Eti Maden İşletmeleri Genel Müdürlüğü
- Type: Government-owned corporation
- Industry: Borate minerals mining and refining
- Founded: 1935
- Headquarters: Ankara, Turkey
- Revenue: ▲ ₺26.17 billion (2023)
- Operating income: ▲ ₺16.27 billion (2023)
- Net income: ▲ ₺14.48 billion (2023)
- Total assets: ▲ ₺47 billion (2023)
- Total equity: ▲ ₺42.06 billion (2023)
- Owner: Turkey Wealth Fund
- Website: https://etimaden.gov.tr/en

Eti Maden is a Turkish state-owned mining and chemicals company focusing on boron products. It holds a government monopoly on the mining of borate minerals in Turkey, which possesses 73% of the world's known deposits. In 2012, it held a 47% share of global production of borate minerals, ahead of its main competitor, Rio Tinto Group, which held 23%. It is owned by the Turkey Wealth Fund.

In 2012, it was the forty-first largest industrial company in Turkey, with an annual revenue of $850 million.

It was founded in 1935 as Etibank, a bank created to finance Turkish natural resource extraction; in 1993, the company's banking activities were privatized, and its mining activities separated under the name Eti Holding A.Ş. In 2004, the company was restructured again and named Eti Mine Works.

== Etiproducts ==
Etiproducts was established in 1982 by Etibank. In 1993 Outokumpu's share was transferred to Etimine SA, sister company of Ab Etiproducts Oy, responsible for the marketing of Turkish boron products in western Europe. In 2005, Ab Etiproducts Oy established a subsidiary company Etiproducts LLC, in Russia.

The company presently operates in Scandinavia (Finland, Sweden, Norway), the Baltic states (Estonia, Latvia, Lithuania), the African continent, Moldova, Ukraine, Belarus, Russia, CIS countries.

== Products ==
Boron minerals, chemicals and refined products include:

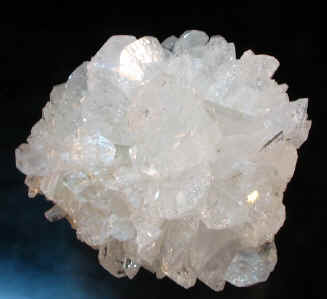
Colemanite

- Boric Acid (Granular and Powder) (Normal - Low - Ultra Low Sulphate) (Nuclear Grade)
- Boron Oxide (Granular and Powder)
- Etibor-48 (Disodium Tetraborate Pentahydrate)
- Borax Deca (Disodium Tetraborate Decahydrate)
- Etibor-68 (Disodium Tetraborate Anhydrous)
- Etidot-67 (Disodium Octaborate Tetrahydrate)

Natural Boron Minerals:

- Colemanite (Ground, Granular, Compacted, Concentrated)
- Ulexite
- Tincal

Natural Boron Chemicals:

- Lithium

== Boron to lithium discovery ==
In 2021 the chair of the Economics Department at the Turkish-German University (TAÜ) wrote that boron could turn into lithium. Eti Maden would open its Lithium Carbonate Production at the end of December 2020. It was built entirely on domestic research and development (R&D) activities and intended to produce lithium from liquid waste, that was generated during the processing of refined boron. During the start of the plant it would only generate 10 tons of lithium per year, but when it finishes its final stage of operation then it would generate 600 tons of lithium per year. This is substantial because it is half of Turkey’s lithium requirements of 1200 tons of lithium per year and having at least half of that on one company is great. The Ministry of Energy and Natural Resources of Turkey notes that this lithium production is the first in the world to be exclusively used by Eti Maden, due to this we can confirm that they are not intending to spread it anywhere else and only use the technique in Eti Maden.

== Positive impact on economy ==
Turkey has 73% of boron deposits, they are: Balikesir’s Bigadic, Kürahya’s Emet and Eskisehir’s Kirka districts. The deposits contain a lot of lithium (in boron waste). However, because the method was only found in 2020, it wasn’t used to make lithium, instead it sat there untouched until the method was found and the boron waste could be turned into lithium by using it. As a result of the R&D activities that Eti Maden did over the last 3 years, the production of lithium from liquid waste will start. Lithium carbonate and marketable boron products will be produced during this process, which separates lithium from boron from each other in waste products. In recent years, Eti Maden has reached significant success in the cleaning products market by producing cleaning materials from boron products. The $20 million of lithium that Turkey keep importing will stop, as they have made something that will do more than the imports and it will be less expensive to maintain. The Turkish government has made 2 million and 23 thousand cleaning products in the span of 18 years (2002-2020) it seems like the method has been successful as Eti Maden and the Turkish government are getting money from the lithium that it creates and they can use it for other things.
