= Erikli, Bandırma =

Village in Turkey

Erikli
- Neighbourhood
- Location in Turkey Erikli (Marmara)
- Coordinates: 40.349°N 28.094°E
- Country: Turkey
- Province: Balıkesir
- District: Bandırma
- Population (2022): 472
- Time zone: UTC+3 (TRT)

Erikli is a neighbourhood in the municipality and district of Bandırma, located in Balıkesir Province, Turkey. As of 2022, the population is 472.
