= Doğa, Bandırma =

Village in Turkey

Doğa
- Neighbourhood
- Location in Turkey Doğa (Marmara)
- Coordinates: 40.154°N 28.111°E
- Country: Turkey
- Province: Balıkesir
- District: Bandırma
- Population (2022): 571
- Time zone: UTC+3 (TRT)

Doğa is a neighbourhood in the municipality and district of Bandırma, located in Balıkesir Province, Turkey. as of 2022, the population is 571.
