= Doğa Schools =

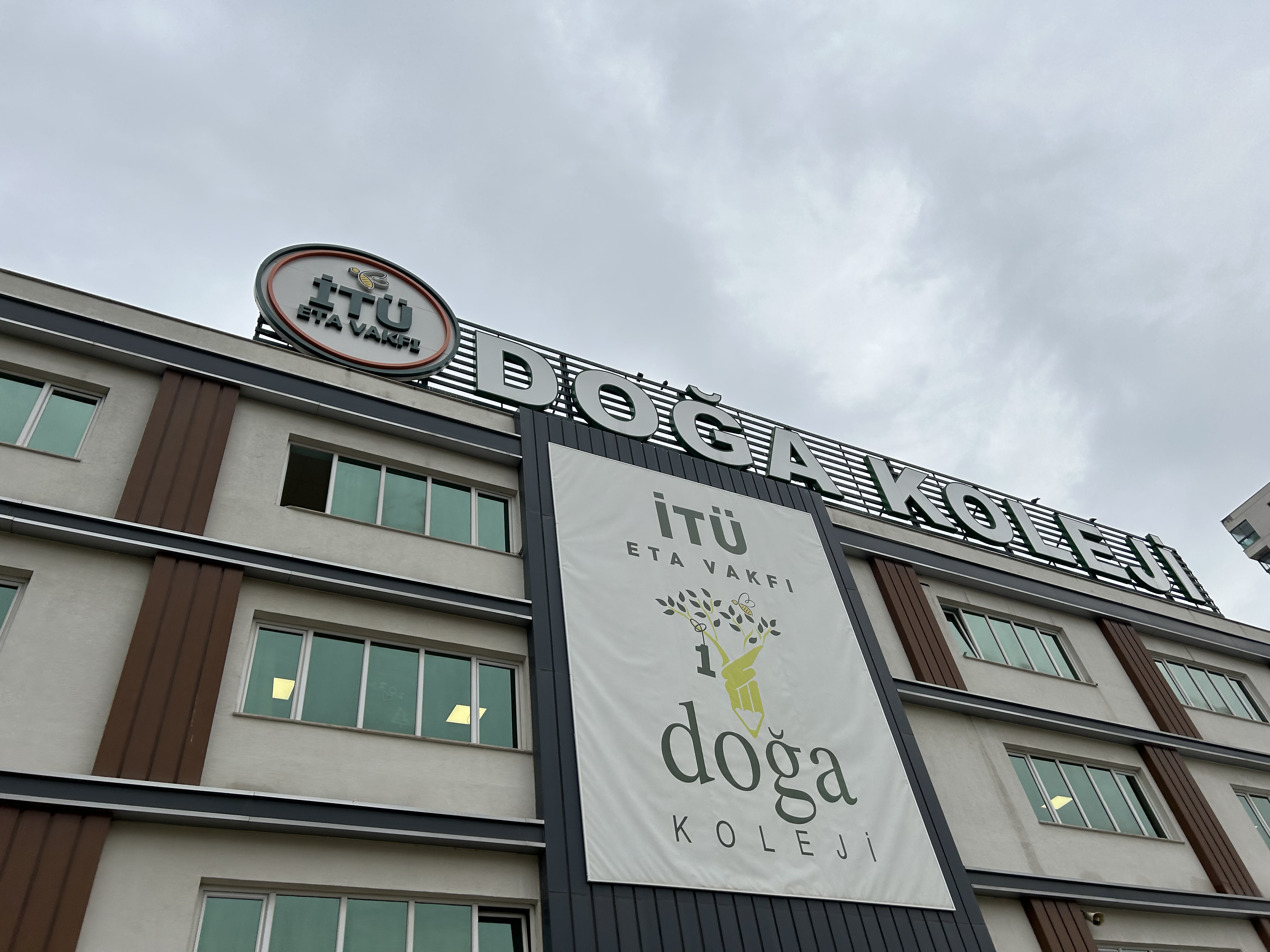
- Doga College in Ankara
- Turkey

Information
- Other name: Doğa College
- Type: Private, coeducational,
- Established: 2002; 24 years ago
- Enrollment: 60,000
- Colors: Orange and green
- Website: www.dogakoleji.k12.tr

Doğa Schools, or Arı İnovasyon ve Bilim Eğitim Hizmetleri Anonim Şirketi, is a chain of private educational institutions in Turkey that offers education from kindergarten through high school. The chain owns nearly 100 schools, over 20 of which are in Istanbul.

== History ==
Fethi Şimsek opened the first Doğa School in 2002 in Beykoz. Şimsek had a background in running chains of preparatory schools for high school and university entrance exams, and English Time, a chain of English language courses.

== Financial problems ==
In 2019, the teachers in several different Doğa Schools protested because upper management had delayed paying their salaries one to five months. The ownership no longer had the money to keep the schools running. As a result, in 2020 Istanbul Technical University bought the chain for 12 million TL. The chain was later purchased by Can Education Group, which also owns the private Istanbul Bilgi University, in 2022.
