= LNB All-Star Game =

All-Star Game in the LNB

- Frequency: Annual
- Inaugurated: 1987
- Organizer: Ligue nationale de basket

The LNB All-Star Game is the annual All-Star Game that is organised by France's professional club basketball governing body, the LNB. The LNB organizes both of the top two French men's pro club competitions, the top-level LNB Pro A, and the second-level LNB Pro B. The event was first held in 1987, and is loosely based on the NBA All-Star Game.

== History ==
From 1987 through 1991, the LNB All-Star Game was played under a "East" versus "West" format. Since 1992, the game is played under a French players versus foreign players (non-French players) format.

== LNB All-Star games ==
Year Held	Location (Venue)	Results	MVP
1987	Limoges	West 134–128 East	(United States) Robert Smith (AS Monaco)
1988	Mulhouse	West 164–136 East	(United States) Graylin Warner (Cholet)
1989	Cholet	West 148–141 East	(United States) Graylin Warner (Cholet)
1990	Nancy	East 170–146 West	(United States) Robert Smith (Antibes)
1991	Pau	West 151–121 East	(Dominican Republic) José Vargas (Saint-Quentin)
1992	Gravelines	French 159–137 Foreigners	(France) Hugues Occansey (Antibes)
1993	Évreux	Foreigners 127–125 French	(France) Jim Bilba (CSP Limoges)
1994	Tours	Foreigners 110–108 French	(France) Hervé Dubuisson (ASA Sceaux)
1995	Pau	Foreigners 147–137 French	(United States) David Rivers (Antibes)
1996	Villeurbanne	French 134–127 Foreigners	(United States) Tony White (Antibes)
1997	Montpellier	Foreigners 115–109 French	(France) Stéphane Risacher (PSG Racing)
1998	Dijon	French 112–98 Foreigners	(United States) Jerry McCullough (BCM Gravelines)
1999	Paris (Coubertin)	Foreigners 124–122 French (OT)	(United States) Keith Hill (SLUC Nancy)
2000 (January); 2000 (December)	Nancy; Antibes	Foreigners 103–93 French; French 123–117 Foreigners	(United States) Stanley Jackson (JDA Dijon) (France) Jim Bilba (ASVEL)
2001	Chalon-sur-Saone	Foreigners 104–97 French	(Croatia) Nikola Radulović (ASVEL)
2002	Paris (POPB)	Foreigners 131–118 French	(Serbia) Dragan Lukovski (Pau-Orthez)
2003	Paris (POPB)	French 126–113 Foreigners	(France) Cyril Julian (Pau-Orthez)
2004	Paris (POPB)	French 105–94 Foreigners	(France) Amara Sy (Le Mans)
2005	Paris (POPB)	Foreigners 96–85 French	(United States) K'Zell Wesson (BCM Gravelines)
2006	Paris (POPB)	Foreigners 124–108 French	(United States) Dewarick Spencer (Chorale Roanne)
2007	Paris (POPB)	French 94–82 Foreigners	(France) Nando de Colo (Cholet)
2008	Paris (POPB)	Foreigners 108–101 French	(France) Laurent Sciarra (Orléans)
2009	Paris (POPB)	French 89–88 Foreigners	(France) Steed Tchicamboud (SLUC Nancy)
2010	Paris (POPB)	Foreigners 103–90 French	(United States) Davon Jefferson (ASVEL)
2011	Paris (POPB)	French 130–123 Foreigners	(France) Amara Sy (Orléans)
2012	Paris (POPB)	Foreigners 111–107 French	(United States) Dwight Buycks (BCM Gravelines)
2013	Paris (POPB)	French 130–117 Foreigners	(France) Nobel Boungou Colo (CSP Limoges)
2014	Paris (Zénith de Paris)	French 137–135 Foreigners (OT)	(United States) Adrien Moerman (CSP Limoges)
2015	Paris (AccorHotels Arena)	French 146–119 Foreigners	(France) Andrew Albicy (BCM Gravelines)
2016	Paris (AccorHotels Arena)	Foreigners 130–129 French	(United States) John Roberson (Élan Chalon)
2017	Paris (AccorHotels Arena)	French 181–175 Foreigners (OT)	(France) Amara Sy (AS Monaco)
2018	Paris (AccorHotels Arena)	French 153–147 Foreigners	(France) Lahaou Konaté (Nanterre)
2019	Paris (AccorHotels Arena)	Foreigners 129–119 French (OT)	(United States) Eric Buckner (AS Monaco)
2021	Paris (AccorHotels Arena)	Foreigners 111–110 French	Brandon Taylor (BCM Gravelines-Dunkerque)
2022	Paris (AccorHotels Arena)	Foreigners 128–136 French	(France) Victor Wembanyama (Metropolitans 92)

=== Players with most MVP awards ===
Player	Wins	Editions
(France) Amara Sy	3	2004, 2011, 2017
(France) Jim Bilba	2	1993, 2000

== ULEB All-Star Game score sheet (1994) ==
3rd ULEB All-Star Game 1994–95
Pavelló Municipal Font de Sant Lluís, Valencia, November 14, 1994: Lega Basket All-Stars - LNB All-Stars 58–54
Pavelló Municipal Font de Sant Lluís, Valencia, November 14, 1994: Liga ACB All-Stars - LNB All-Stars 59–43
Pavelló Municipal Font de Sant Lluís, Valencia, November 14, 1994: Lega Basket All-Stars - Liga ACB All-Stars 53–48
Lega Basket All-Stars (Coaches: Alberto Bucci, Bogdan Tanjević): Wendell Alexis, Joe Binion, Dejan Bodiroga, Dallas Comegys, Emanual Davis, Sasha Đjorđjević, Dan Gay, Gerald Glass, Billy McCaffrey, Petar Naumoski, Jeff Sanders, John Turner.
Liga ACB All-Stars (Coaches: Aíto García Reneses, Manu Moreno): Darrell Armstrong, Michael Curry, Roy Fisher, Dan Godfread, Kenny Green, Warren Kidd, Darryl Middleton, Oscar Schmidt, Corny Thompson, Andy Toolson, Andre Turner.
LNB All-Stars (Coaches: Božidar Maljković, Jacques Monclar): Ron Anderson, Winston Crite, Ron Curry, Tim Kempton, Conrad McRae, David Rivers, Michael Ray Richardson, Delaney Rudd, Rickie Winslow, Michael Young.

== Slam Dunk Contest winners ==
Year Held (Season)	Slam Dunk Champion	Team	Runner-up	Team
1995; 1994–95	(France) Jean-Jacques Bissouma	Union Sportive Pau Nord-Est	(United States) Rickie Winslow	Pau-Orthez
1996; 1995–96	(France) Alain Digbeu	ASVEL	(United States) George Gilmore	Montpellier
1997; 1996–97	(France) Thierry Zig	Levallois	(France) Laurent Cazalon	Dijon
1998; 1997–98	(France) Laurent Cazalon	Dijon		
1999; 1998–99	(United States) Harold Doyal	STB Le Havre	(United States) Aaron Mitchell	Aix Maurienne
2000; 1999–00	(Central African Republic) Salomon Sami	ASVEL		
2000 (II); 2000–01	(France) Laurent Cazalon (2)	Roanne	(Russia) Aleksandr Miloserdov	Olympique d'Antibes
2001; 2001–02	(France) Boris Diaw	Pau-Orthez		
2002; 2002–03	(France) Steve Lobel	professional dunker	(France) Boris Diaw	Pau-Orthez
2003; 2003–04	(United Kingdom) Stefan Gill	professional dunker	(France) Abdoulaye Bamba	professional dunker
2004; 2004–05	(France) Steve Lobel (2)	professional dunker	(France) Yannick Bokolo	Le Mans Sarthe Basket
2005; 2005–06	(France) Kadour Ziani	professional dunker	(France) Brice de Blaine	professional dunker
2006; 2006–07	(France) Guy Dupuy	professional dunker	(United States) Dwayne Mitchell	Paris Basket Racing
2007; 2007–08	(Central African Republic) Max Kouguere	Gravelines	Guy Dupuy	professional dunker
2008; 2008–09	(Canada) Justin Darlington	professional dunker	(France) Yann de Blaine	professional dunker
2009; 2009–10	(United States) Kevin Kemp	professional dunker	(France) Guy Dupuy	professional dunker
2010; 2010–11	(United States) Zack Wright	Limoges	(United States) Mark Haynes	Élan Chalon
2011; 2011–12	(United States) Dar Tucker	Aix Maurienne	(Central African Republic) Max Kouguere	Le Mans Sarthe Basket
2012; 2012–13	(United States) L. D. Williams	Bourg-en-Bresse	(United States) Jared Newson	HTV Basket
2013; 2013–14	(United States) Travis Leslie	ASVEL	(United States) Mark Lyons	Roanne
2014; 2014–15	(Ghana) (France) Yakuba Ouattara	AS Denain Voltaire	(United States) James Southerland	Limoges
2015; 2015–16	(Ghana) (France) Yakuba Ouattara (2)	AS Monaco	(United States) Akil Mitchell	Antibes Sharks
2016; 2016–17	(France) Jérémy Nzeulie	Élan Sportif Chalonnais	(United States) Deonte Burton	Lille
2017; 2017–18	(United States) D.J. Stephens	Le Mans Sarthe Basket	(France) Sylvain Francisco	Levallois Metropolitans
2018; 2018–19	(United States) Kevin Harley	Poitiers Basket 86	(United States) Travis Cohn	UJAP Quimper 29
2019; 2019–20	(United States) D.J. Stephens (2)	Le Mans Sarthe Basket	(France) Isaïa Cordinier	Nanterre 92
2022 2022–23	(France) Yves Pons	ASVEL	(France) Juhann Begarin	Paris

== All-Star Game rosters 1987–2019 ==
=== 80s ===
1st All-Star Game 1986–87
Palais de Sports de Beaublanc, Limoges, att: 5000, May 6, 1987: West - East 134–128
EAST (George Fisher): Pierre Bressant 11, Billy Joe Williams 14, Robert Smith 24, Bill Varner 23, Jean-Aimé Toupane 6, Jean-Louis Hersin, Christian Garnier 2, Lionel Rigo 2, Jean-Luc Deganis 15, Frédéric Monetti 6, Éric Beugnot 11, Mick Pitts 12.
WEST (Michel Gomez): Freddy Hufnagel 6, Valéry Demory 12, Patrick Cham 11, Richard Dacoury 20, Howard Carter 24, Jacques Monclar 4, Paul Thompson, Hervé Dubuisson 13, Benkali Kaba 2, Tom Scheffler 8, Georges Vestris 6, Stéphane Ostrowski 15, Clarence Kea 13.

2nd All-Star Game 1987–88
Mulhouse Sports Palace, att: 4,000, May 20, 1988: West - East 164–136
EAST: Pierre Bressant, Hervé Dubuisson, James Hardy, Skeeter Jackson, Robert Smith, Jean-Aimé Toupane, Ron Davis, Christian Monschau, Vincent Collet, Damien Pastrès, Christophe Soulé.
WEST: Gregor Beugnot, Jacques Monclar, Hugues Occansey, Stéphane Ostrowski, Don Collins, Georges Vestris, Graylin Warner, Didier Gadou, Andrew Fields, Franck Butter.

3d All-Star Game 1988–89
La Meilleraie, Cholet, May 12, 1989: West - East 146–141
EAST (Francis Charneux): Pierre Bressant, Robert Smith 20, Jacques Monclar, Billy Joe Williams, Éric Occansey, Pat Burtey, Georgy Adams, Ron Davis 24, Philip Szanyiel, Hervé Dubuisson, Rick Raivio 22, Franck Butter and Benkali Kaba, Apollo Faye, Willie Redden.
WEST (Jean Galle): Gregor Beugnot, Bruno Lejeune, Valéry Demory, Richard Dacoury, Freddy Hufnagel, Stéphane Ostrowski 33, Graylin Warner 29, Don Collins, Michael Brooks 34, Georges Vestris, Jean-Luc Deganis, Stéphane Lauvergne and Andrew Fields, Didier Gadou, Christophe Soulé.

4th All-Star Game 1989–90
Palais des Sports Jean-Weille, Nancy, att: 4,000, June 1, 1990: East - West 170–146
EAST: Jean-Aimé Toupane, Ron Davis 24, Franck Butter, Philip Szanyiel, Robert Smith, Georgi Adams, Lee Johnson 26, Hugues Occansey 24, Eric Occansey 8, Greg Beugnot.
WEST: Michael Brooks 40, Ken Dancy, Stéphane Ostrowski, Richard Dacoury, Valéry Demory, Jim Bilba, Antoine Rigaudeau, Freddy Hufnagel.

=== 90s ===
8th All-Star Game 1993–94
Palais des Sports, Tours, att: 4,000, March 6, 1994: Foreign Stars - French Stars 110–108
FOREIGN STARS (Laurent Buffard, Jacques Monclar): Don Collins, Skeeter Henry 24, Bill Jones, George Montgomery, David Rivers, Delaney Rudd, José Vargas, Michael Young, Marcus Webb.
FRENCH STARS (Božidar Maljković, Jean-Luc Monschau): Jim Bilba, Yann Bonato, Richard Dacoury, Hervé Dubuisson 30, Frédéric Forte, Marc M'Bahia, Stéphane Ostrowski, Antoine Rigaudeau, Moustapha Sonko

9th All-Star Game 1994–95
Palais des Sports de Pau, Pau, att: 8,000, March 9, 1995: Foreign Stars - French Stars 147–137
FOREIGN STARS: David Rivers 22, Delaney Rudd, Michael Young, Ron Curry 24, Michael Ray Richardson 24, Ron Anderson, Conrad McRae, Rickie Winslow, Ian Lockhart, Tim Kempton.
FRENCH STARS: Jim Bilba, Yann Bonato 44, Richard Dacoury 20, Frédéric Forte, Stéphane Ostrowski 21, Antoine Rigaudeau, Thierry Gadou, Laurent Foirest, Bruno Coqueran, Moustapha Sonko, Stéphane Risacher.

11th All-Star Game 1996–97
Pierre-de-Coubertin Sports Palace, Montpellier, att: 5,000, March 29, 1997: Foreign Stars - French Stars 115–109
FOREIGN STARS (Bogdan Tanjevic): Delaney Rudd, Skeeter Henry, David Booth, Paul Fortier, Brad Sellers, James Blackwell, Ron Anderson, Michael Ray Richardson, Steve Payne, Josh Grant.
FRENCH STARS (Jacques Monclar: Moustapha Sonko, Yann Bonato, Alain Digbeu, Jim Bilba, Frédéric Weis, Frédéric Forte, Georgy Adams, Stéphane Risacher, Cyril Julian, Stéphane Ostrowski.

12th All-Star Game 1997–98
Palais des Sports de Dijon, att: 4,000, April 25, 1998: French Stars - Foreign Stars 170–146
FOREIGN STARS: Keith Hill 16, Nenad Marković 16, Jerry McCullough 14, Delaney Rudd 11, Nikola Lončar 9, Paul Graham 8, Josh Grant 8, Jean-Jacques Conceição 6, Eric Struelens 6, Derek Durham 4.
FRENCH STARS: Alain Digbeu 27, Stéphane Risacher 20, Moustapha Sonko 18, Paul Fortier 14, Jim Bilba 9, Bruno Hamm 8, Derrick Lewis 7, Laurent Foirest 6, Thierry Gadou 3, Frédéric Weis.

13th All-Star Game 1998–99
Coubertin, Paris, January 2, 1999: Foreign Stars - French Stars 124–122
FOREIGN STARS: Delaney Rudd 14, Nenad Marković 14, Juan Aisa 2, Keith Jennings 10, Jerome Robinson 7, Ron Anderson 21, Keith Hill 21, Josh Grant 19, Darius Hall 13, Gary Alexander 3.
FRENCH STARS: Moustapha Sonko 26, Laurent Sciarra 9, Laurent Foirest 12, Alain Digbeu 19, Christophe Dumas 8, Crawford Palmer 10, Cyril Julian 8, Georgy Adams 9, Jim Bilba 17, Frédéric Weis 4.

14th All-Star Game 1999–00
Nancy, January 2, 2000: Foreign Stars - French Stars 103–93
FOREIGN STARS: Marlon Maxey 21, Ray Minlend 19, Jay Larranaga 13, Dante Calabria 13, Stanley Jackson 10, Derek Durham 9, Steve Payne 5, Keith Gatlin 5, Gary Alexander 6, Harper Williams 2.
FRENCH STARS: Thierry Gadou 15, Stéphane Risacher 14, Laurent Sciarra 12, Moustapha Sonko 10, Jim Bilba 10, Yann Bonato 8, Frédéric N'Kembe 7, Makan Dioumassi 6, Cyril Julian 6, Frédéric Weis 5.

=== 2000s ===
15th All-Star Game 2000–01
Azur Arena, Antibes, December 29, 2000: French Stars - Foreign Stars 123–117
FRENCH STARS (Gregor Beugnot, Jean-Louis Borg): : Laurent Sciarra, Mickaël Piétrus, David Gautier, Jim Bilba, Cyril Julian, Tony Parker, Yann Mollinari, Laurent Bernard, Laurent Pluvy, Willem Laure, David Frigout, and Fabien Dubos.
FOREIGN STARS (Vincent Collet, Didier Dobbels): Shawnta Rogers, Roger Esteller, Zakhar Pashutin, Art Long, Gary Alexander, Stevin Smith, Curtis McCants, Chris King, Skeeter Henry, Andre Riddick and Geof Lear.

16th All-Star Game 2001–02
Le Colisée, Chalon-sur-Saone, December 28, 2001: Foreign Stars - French Stars 104–97
FRENCH STARS (Claude Bergeaud): Laurent Pluvy, Yann Mollinari, Florent Piétrus, Yann Bonato, Mickaël Piétrus, David Gautier, Fabien Dubos, Boris Diaw, Cyril Julian, Sacha Giffa.
FOREIGN STARS (Jean-Luc Monschau): Nikola Radulovic, Brian Howard, Nikola Vujcic, Danny Strong, Marc Brown, Roger Esteller, Andre Riddick, Robert Gulyas, Larry Terry.

17th All-Star Game 2002–03
Paris-Bercy, Paris, December 28, 2002: Foreign Stars - French Stars 131–118
FRENCH STARS (Philippe Hervé, Ruddy Nelhomme): Laurent Bernard, Babacar Cisse, Mickaël Piétrus, Laurent Sciarra, Yann Bonato, Makan Dioumassi, Vincent Masingue, Florent Piétrus, Jim Bilba, David Gautier, Vasco Evtimov, Cyril Julian.
FOREIGN STARS (Jean-Luc Monschau, Michel Veyronnet): Keith Jennings, Shawnta Rogers, Dragan Lukovski, Scooter Barry, Danny Strong, Jermaine Guice, Ricardo Greer, Rico Hill, K'zell Wesson, Rahshon Turner, Robert Gulyas, Rod Sellers.

18th All-Star Game 2003–04
Paris-Bercy, Paris, December 28, 2003: French Stars - Foreign Stars 126–113
FRENCH STARS (Vincent Collet: Paccelis Morlende, Stéphane Dondon, Laurent Foirest 27, Vincent Masingue, Cyril Julian 20, Laurent Sciarra, Babacar Cisse, Frédéric N’Kembe, Mickaël Gelabale, Thierry Rupert, Claude Marquis, Thierry Gadou.
FOREIGN STARS (Frédéric Sarre): Randolph Childress, Jermaine Guice, Danny Strong 20, Rahshon Turner, Sandro Nicević, Jason Rowe*, Dragan Lukovski, Hollis Price 18, Rowan Barrett 14, Vakhtang Natsvlishvili, Rick Hughes, T.J. Lux
*Jason Rowe replaced injured Shawnta Rogers.

19th All-Star Game 2004–05
Paris-Bercy, Paris, att: 14,700, December 29, 2004: French Stars - Foreign Stars 105–94
FRENCH STARS (Erman Kunter): Laurent Sciarra 11, Pape-Philippe Amagou, Mickael Mokongo 12, Mamoutou Diarra, Yannick Bokolo, Laurent Foirest 24, Amara Sy 26, Luc-Arthur Vebobe 11, Maxime Zianveni, Cyril Akpomedah, Claude Marquis, Alain Koffi.
FOREIGN STARS (Eric Girard): Marques Green, Hollis Price, Terrell Lyday, Jermaine Guice, Thabo Sefolosha 17, Tariq Kirksay, Boniface Ndong, K'Zell Wesson, Sharif Fajardo, Hüseyin Beşok, Clint Cotis Harrison*, Rahshon Turner 24.
*Clint Cotis Harrison was injured

20th All-Star Game 2005–06
Paris-Bercy, Paris, December 18, 2005: French Stars - Foreign Stars 96–85
FRENCH STARS (Didier Gadoum John Douaglin): Yohann Sangare, Amara Sy, Pape-Philippe Amagou 12, Babacar Cisse, Mamoutou Diarra, Yakhouba Diawara, Maxime Zianveni 13, Claude Marquis 12, Thomas Dubiez, Victor Samnick, Cyril Julian. Ian Mahinmi.
FOREIGN STARS (Claude Bergeaud, German Castano): K'zell Wesson 19, Jimmy Baxter, Loonie Cooper, Ricardo Greer, John Linehan, Mike Bauer, Jason Rowe 12, Tyson Wheeler, Hüseyin Beşok, Kelvin Torbert, Mario Bennett, Lamayn Wilson.

21st All-Star Game 2006–07
Paris-Bercy, Paris, December 18, 2006: Foreign Stars - French Stars 124–108
FRENCH STARS (Jean-Luc Monschau, Franck Le Goff): Ahmed Fellah 4, Ali Traore 24, Cyril Julian 21, Mamoutou Diarra 17, Yannick Bokolo 4, Maxime Zianveni, Marc-Antoine Pellin, Georgi Joseph, Tariq Kirksay 7, Laurent Sciarra 9, Pape Badiane 10, Yohann Sangare 11.
FOREIGN STARS (Grégor Beugnot, Jean-Louis Borg): Cedrick Banks 12, Kenny Gregory 14, Aaron Harper 5, Ricardo Greer 6, Terrell Everett 10, Dewarick Spencer 19, Jermaine Guice 9, Eric Campbell 12, Mario Bennett, Marc Salyers 20, Terence Dials 10, Michael Wright 7.

22nd All-Star Game 2007–08
Paris-Bercy, Paris, att: 14,828, December 29, 2007: French Stars - Foreign Stars 94–82
FRENCH STARS (Yves Baratet, Ruddy Nelhomme: Nicolas Batum, Dounia Issa, Alain Koffi, Steed Tchicamboud, Pape Badiane, Marc-Antoine Pellin, Nando de Colo 13, Victor Samnick, Cyril Julian 16, Laurent Foirest, Vincent Masingue, Cyril Akpomedah, Yohann Sangare 15.
FOREIGN STARS (Jean-Luc Monschau, Michel Veyronnet: John Cox, Jimmal Ball, Sean Colson, Lamayn Wilson, Chevon Troutman 18, Jeff Greer, Brion Rush 8, Uche Nsonwu-Amadi, Tony Williams, Sam Clancy Jr., Ricardo Greer 20, Marc Salyers.

23rd All-Star Game 2008–09
Paris-Bercy, Paris, att: 14,658, December 28, 2008: Foreign Stars - French Stars 108–101

FRENCH STARS (Philippe Hervé, Didier Dobbels): Amara Sy 17, Abdoulaye M'Baye, Laurent Foirest, Alain Koffi, Yannick Bokolo, Stéphane Risacher, Nando de Colo 15, Ali Traoré, Victor Samnick, Laurent Sciarra 25. On hold: Marc-Antoine Pellin, Cheikhou Thioune.
FOREIGN STARS (Vincent Collet, Jean-Marc Dupraz): Cedrick Banks, Lamayn Wilson 23, Zack Wright 18, Kevin Houston, Brion Rush, Damir Krupalija, Tony Skinn, Eric Campbell 15, Austin Nichols, Chevon Troutman. On hold: Hrvoje Perincic, Rashaun Freeman.

24th All-Star Game 2009–10
Paris-Bercy, Paris, December 30, 2009: French Stars - Foreign Stars 89–88
FOREIGN STARS (Erman Kunter, Éric Girard: John Linehan, Derrick Obasohan, Ricardo Greer, Uche Nsonwu-Amadi, Dewarick Spencer, Ben Woodside, Cedrick Banks, Angel Daniel Vassallo, Sean Marshall, Mouhamed Sene. Reserves: Kareem Reid, Akinlolu Akingbala.
FRENCH STARS (JD Jackson, Didier Dobbels: Steed Tchicamboud, Antoine Diot, Cyril Akpomedah, Dounia Issa, Ali Traore, Edwin Jackson, Fabien Causeur, David Melody, Mickael Gelabale, Pape Badiane. Reserves: Abdoulaye MBaye, Pierre-Yves Guillard.

=== 2010s ===
25th All-Star Game 2010–11
Paris-Bercy, Paris, att: 14,700, December 30, 2010: Foreign Stars - French Stars 103–90
FRENCH STARS (Jean-Luc Monschau): Yannick Bokolo, Pape-Philippe Amagou 13, Mickael Gelabale 20, Cyril Akpomedah, Alain Koffi, Andrew Albicy, Steed Tchicamboud, Antoine Mendy, Luc-Arthur Vebobe 14, Dounia Issa.
FOREIGN STARS (Jean-Denys Choulet): Ben Woodside, Bernard King 10, Sammy Mejia, Tremmell Darden, Chris Massie 10, Marquez Haynes, Demetric Bennett 13, K. C. Rivers 10, Davon Jefferson 21, Akin Akingbala 10.

26th All-Star Game 2011–12
Paris-Bercy, Paris, att: 14,590, December 29, 2011: French Stars - Foreign Stars 130–123
FRENCH STARS (Christian Monschau): Amara Sy 23, Charles Lombahe-Kahudi 15, Fabien Causeur 11, Yannick Bokolo 4, Paccelis Morlende 2, Evan Fournier 14, Nicholas Pope 7, Victor Samnick 14, Ludovic Vaty 8, Adrien Moerman 22, Andrew Albicy 10, Kim Tillie.
FOREIGN STARS (Jean-Luc Monschau): Eric Chatfield 6, Akin Akingbala 12, Teddy Gipson 5, Alade Aminu 15, Cedrick Banks 8, Taylor Rochestie 11, Blake Schilb 12, Andre Barrett 8, John Holland 10, John Linehan 2, Jawad Williams 13, Lamont Hamilton 21.

27th All-Star Game 2012–13
Paris-Bercy, Paris, att: 14,570, December 30, 2012: Foreign Stars - French Stars 111–107
FRENCH STARS (Gregor Beugnot, Alain Weisz: Antoine Diot, Edwin Jackson 13, Amara Sy 14, Ilian Evtimov, Alexis Ajinça 13, Marc-Antoine Pellin, Steed Tchicamboud, Pape-Philippe Amagou, Nobel Boungou Colo, Charles Kahudi, Ludovic Vaty 17, Rudy Gobert.
FOREIGN STARS ((JD Jackson, Claude Bergeaud): Dwight Buycks 17, Bernard King 14, Blake Schilb 13, Jawad Williams 13, Sean May, Khalid El-Amin 13, Souleymane Diabate, Kyle McAlarney, Marcus Goree, Darryl Monroe, Ahmad Nivins.

28th All-Star Game 2013–14
Zénith Arena, Paris, December 29, 2013: French Stars - Foreign Stars 130–117
FRENCH STARS (Jean-Marc Dupraz, Nikola Antić): Andrew Albicy, Edwin Jackson, Nobel Boungou Colo 28, Florent Piétrus, Johan Passave-Ducteil 22, Antoine Diot, David Denave, Charles Lombahe-Kahudi, Jérémy Leloup, Adrien Moerman, Mouhammadou Jaiteh, Amara Sy*.
FOREIGN STARS (Philippe Hervé, Germain Castano) : Taurean Green, A. J. Slaughter, Austin Nichols, J.K. Edwards, Randal Falker, Trenton Meacham, Kyle McAlarney, David Lighty, Anthony Dobbins, Brian Greene, Lamayn Wilson, Ahmad Nivins 28.
*Amara Sy did not play due to injury

29th All-Star Game 2014–15
AccorHotels Arena, Paris, January 3, 2015: French Stars - Foreign Stars 137–135 aet 121–121
FRENCH STARS (Vincent Collet, Frédéric Brouillaud): Charles Lombahe-Kahudi 9, Antoine Diot 8, Leo Westermann, Pape Sy 8, Johan Passave-Ducteil 10, Mouhammadou Jaiteh 24, Nobel Boungou Colo, Adrien Moerman 40, Florent Pietrus, Andrew Albicy 3, Rodrigue Beaubois*, Alain Koffi 9.
FOREIGN STARS (Jean-Marc Dupraz, Savo Vučević: Sharrod Ford 18, Mark Payne 11, Jamar Smith 19, Kenny Boynton 4, Mykal Riley 15, Erving Walker 14, Zachery Peacock 7, Marcus Dove 6, Daequan Cook 13, Steven Gray 11, Kyle Weems 17, Darius Adams**.
*Rodrigue Beaubois did not play due to injury.
**Darius Adams replaced injured Ricardo Greer.

30th All-Star Game 2015–16
AccorHotels Arena, Paris, att: 15,000, December 30, 2015: French Stars - Foreign Stars 146–119
FRENCH STARS (JD Jackson, Christophe Denis): Rodrigue Beaubois, Mickaël Gelabale, Charles Lombahe-Kahudi, Mouhammadou Jaiteh, Ali Traoré, Andrew Albicy 12, Antoine Eito, Billy Yakuba Ouattara, Nobel Boungou Colo 22, Ilian Evtimov, Wilfried Yeguete, Louis Labeyrie 34.
FOREIGN STARS (Zvezdan Mitrović, Laurent Pluvy): Heiko Schaffartzik, Willie Solomon 22, Mykal Riley 18, David Andersen, Marcus Dove, Michael Thompson, Chris Jones, Jeremy Hazell, Ángel Daniel Vassallo, Drew Gordon, Tim Blue, Darryl Watkins.

30th All-Star Game 2016–17
AccorHotels Arena, Paris, att: 15,000, December 29, 2016: Foreign Stars - French Stars 130–129
FOREIGN STARS (Jean-Denys Choulet, Rémi Giuitta): D.J. Cooper, Serhiy Hladyr, Spencer Butterfield, Tim Blue 21, Darryl Watkins, Cameron Clark 18, Dario Hunt, Jakim Donaldson, Jason Rich, John Robertson 17, Mark Payne, Walter Hodge.
FRENCH STARS (Zvezdan Mitrović, Cédric Heitz): Axel Julien, Paul Lacombe, William Howard, Wilfried Yeguete 21, Moustapha Fall, Alain Koffi, Édouard Choquet, Jérémy Nzeulie, Nicolas Lang 19, David Michineau, Vincent Poirier 19, Ousmane Camara.

30th All-Star Game 2017–18
AccorHotels Arena, Paris, att: 15,000, December 29, 2017: French Stars - Foreign Stars 181–175 aet 164–164
FOREIGN STARS (Zvezdan Mitrović, Germain Castano): John Roberson, Gerald Robinson, David Logan, Zachery Peacock, Miro Bilan, Zack Wright, Kenny Hayes, Klemen Prepelič, Trae Golden, Raymond Cowels, D.J. Stephens, Elmedin Kikanović.
FRENCH STARS (Éric Bartecheky, Laurent Pluvy): Élie Okobo, Paul Lacombe, William Howard, Amara Sy 20, Louis Labeyrie 35, Benjamin Sene, Jérémy Nzeulie, Charles Lombahe-Kahudi, Alain Koffi, Amine Noua, Youssoupha Fall, Boris Diaw*
*Axel Bouteille was injured and replaced by Boris Diaw.

31st All-Star Game 2018–19
AccorHotels Arena, Paris, att: 15,988, December 29, 2018: French Stars - Foreign Stars 153–147
FOREIGN STARS (Laurent Legname, Germain Castano): Justin Robinson 21, David Lighty, Julian Wright, Devin Ebanks, Youssou Ndoye, Donta Smith, Karvel Anderson, David Holston, Vitalis Chikoko, Roko Ukic, Mardy Collins, Mouphtaou Yarou 22.
FRENCH STARS (Zvezdan Mitrović, Laurent Pluvy): Yakuba Ouattara, Paul Lacombe, Lahaou Konaté 33, Amine Noua 21, Youssoupha Fall 22, Théo Maledon, Nicolas De Jong, Antoine Eito, Jeremy Leloup*, Alain Koffi, Ali Traoré, Benoît Mangin.
*Charles Lombahe-Kahudi was injured and replaced by Jeremy Leloup.

32nd All-Star Game 2019–20
AccorHotels Arena, Paris, att: 15,000, December 29, 2019: Foreign Stars - French Stars 129–119
FRENCH STARS (Zvezdan Mitrović, Stéphane Eberlin): Antoine Diot, Edwin Jackson, Isaïa Cordinier, Damien Inglis 29, Yannis Morin, Antoine Eito (c) 15, Axel Julian, Jean-Batiste Maille, Benoît Mangin, Alpha Kaba, Livio Jean-Charles, Abdoulaye Ndoye.
FOREIGN STARS (Frédéric Fauthoux, Rémy Valin): Dee Bost, Briante Weber, Chris Horton, David Holston, Vitalis Chikoko, Eric Buckner* 27, Norris Cole, Tonye Jekiri, Miralem Halilovic*, J. J. O'Brien, Justin Robinson, Rob Gray 21.
*Zack Wright, and Semaj Christon withdrew due to injury and replaced by Miralem Halilovic and MVP Erik Buckner.

== Players with the most appearances ==
Player	All-Star Appearances	Years	All-Star Game MVP	Notes
(France) Stéphane Ostrowski	13	1987–1998, 2000	-	6× FIBA European Selection
(France) Jim Bilba	12	1990–2001	1993, 2000	1× FIBA EuroStar
(France) Cyril Julian	8	1999, 2000, 2000 (I), 2003	2003	
(France) Laurent Sciarra	8	1999, 2000 (I), 2000 (II), 2001, 2002, 2003, 2004, 2006, 2008)	2008	
(France) Moustapha Sonko	7	1994–2000	-	
(France) Yann Bonato	7	1994–1997, 2000, 2002, 2003	-	1× FIBA EuroStar
(France) Stéphane Risacher	6	1995–1998, 2000, 2008	1997	
(France) Richard Dacoury	6	1987, 1989, 1990, 1991, 1994, 1995	-	3× FIBA European Selection; 1× FIBA EuroStar
(France) Amara Sy	6	2004, 2005, 2008, 2011, 2012, 2017	2004, 2011, 2017	Withdrew from 2013, due to injury.
(France) Charles Lombahe-Kahudi	6	2011, 2012, 2013, 2014, 2015, 2018	-	Withdrew from 2017, due to injury.
(France) Antoine Diot	5	2010, 2012, 2013, 2015, 2019	-	
(United States) Delaney Rudd	5	1994–1999	-	1x FIBA EuroStar; 1x ULEB All-Star
(United States) Ricardo Greer	5	2002, 2005, 2006, 2007, 2009	-	
(France) Hervé Dubuisson	4	1987, 1988, 1989, 1994	1994	1× FIBA European Selection
(France) Mickael Gelabale	4	2003, 2009, 2010, 2015	-	
(France) Nobel Boungou Colo	4	2012–2015	2013	
(France) Frédéric Weis	4	1997, 1998, 1999, 2000	-	

== Distinctions ==
=== FIBA Hall of Fame ===
- (Angola) Jean-Jacques Conceição
- (Socialist Federal Republic of Yugoslavia) Bogdan Tanjević (coach)
- (France) Antoine Rigaudeau

=== Basketball Hall of Fame ===
- (France) Tony Parker

=== EuroLeague Hall of Fame ===
- (Croatia) Nikola Vujčić
