= 2008–09 Pro A season =

2008–09 LNB Pro A season
- League: LNB Pro A
- Sport: Basketball
- Games: 240 (regular season)
- Teams: 16
- TV partner: Sport+

Regular Season
- Top seed: Lyon-Villeurbanne
- Season MVP: (United States) Austin Nichols (Hyères-Toulon) (France) Alain Koffi (Le Mans)
- Top scorer: (United States) Austin Nichols (Hyères-Toulon)

2008-09 Finals
- Champions: Lyon-Villeurbanne
- Runners-up: Orléans

LNB Pro A seasons
- ← 2007–08 2009–10 →

The 2008–09 LNB Pro A season was the 87th season of the French Basketball Championship and the 22nd season since inception of the Ligue Nationale de Basketball (LNB). The regular season started on October 3, 2008 and ended on May 11, 2009. The play-offs were held from May 22, 2009 until June 20, 2009.

ASVEL Lyon-Villeurbanne, after finishing at the top seed of the regular season, won the French Pro A League by defeating Orléans in playoffs final (55-41).

== Promotion and relegation ==
At the beginning of the 2008-09 season

Teams promoted from 2007–08 Pro B (French 2nd division)

- Rouen
- Besançon

Teams relegated to 2008–09 Pro B

- Paris-Levallois
- Clermont-Ferrand

At the end of the 2008-09 season

2008-09 Pro A Champion: ASVEL Lyon-Villeurbanne

Teams promoted from 2008–09 Pro B

- Poitiers
- Paris-Levallois

Teams relegated to 2009–10 Pro B

- Besançon
- Pau-Orthez

== Team arenas ==
Location of teams in Pro A League 2008–09

Team	Home city	Stadium	Capacity
Besançon BCD	Besançon	Palais des Sports de Besançon	4,200
ÉS Chalon-sur-Saône	Chalon-sur-Saône	Le Colisée	5,000
Cholet Basket	Cholet	La Meilleraie	5,191
JDA Dijon	Dijon	Palais des Sports Jean-Michel Geoffroy	5,000
BCM Gravelines Dunkerque	Gravelines	Sportica	3,500
Hyères Toulon Var Basket	Hyères – Toulon	Palais des Sports de Toulon; Espace 3000	4,700; 2,200
STB Le Havre	Le Havre	Salle des Docks Océane	3,598
Le Mans Sarthe Basket	Le Mans	Antarès	6,003
ASVEL Basket	Lyon – Villeurbanne	Astroballe	5,643
SLUC Nancy Basket	Nancy	Palais des Sports Jean Weille	6,027
Orléans Loiret Basket	Orléans	Zénith d'Orléans	5,338
Élan Béarnais Pau-Orthez	Pau-Orthez	Palais des Sports de Pau	7,813
Chorale Roanne Basket	Roanne	Halle André Vacheresse	5,020
SPO Rouen Basket	Rouen	Salle des Cotonniers	1,300
Strasbourg IG	Strasbourg	Rhénus Sport	6,200
JA Vichy	Vichy	Palais des Sports Pierre Coulon	3,300

== Team standings ==
Clinched playoff berth
Relegated

#	Team	Pld	W	L	PF	PA
1	Lyon-Villeurbanne	30	22	8	2367	2133
2	Orléans	30	21	9	2243	2058
3	Le Mans	30	20	10	2338	2029
4	Nancy	30	20	10	2432	2338
5	Roanne	30	19	11	2393	2345
6	Gravelines-Dunkerque	30	17	13	2322	2230
7	Chalon-sur-Saône	30	16	14	2279	2257
8	Strasbourg	30	16	14	2378	2324
9	Cholet	30	15	15	2310	2307
10	Vichy	30	13	17	2027	2090
11	Hyères Toulon	30	13	17	2368	2436
12	Dijon	30	11	19	2448	2564
13	Rouen	30	11	19	2251	2389
14	Le Havre	30	10	20	2286	2471
15	Besançon	30	9	21	2268	2479
16	Pau-Orthez	30	7	23	2235	2595

== Playoffs ==
Quarter Finals
1	Lyon-Villeurbanne	2
8	Strasbourg	1
4	Nancy	2
5	Roanne	1
2	Orléans	2
7	Chalon-sur-Saône	0
3	Le Mans	2
6	Gravelines-Dunkerque	0

Semifinals
1	Lyon-Villeurbanne	2
4	Nancy	1
2	Orléans	2
3	Le Mans	1

Finals
1	Lyon-Villeurbanne	55
2	Orléans	41

== Awards ==
=== Regular season MVPs ===
- Foreign MVP: (United States) Austin Nichols (Hyères-Toulon)
- French MVP: (France) Alain Koffi (Le Mans)

=== Best Coach ===
- (France) fr:Philippe Hervé (Orléans)

=== Most Improved Player ===
- (France) Rodrigue Beaubois (Cholet)

=== Best Defensive Player ===
- (Italy) Tony Dobbins (Orléans)

=== Rising Star Award ===
- (France) Thomas Heurtel (Pau-Orthez)

=== Player of the month ===
Month	Player	Team
October	(United States) Cedrick Banks	Orléans
November	(France) Laurent Foirest	Lyon-Villeurbanne
December	(Mali) Amara Sy	Lyon-Villeurbanne
January	(France) Cyril Julian	Nancy
February	(United States) Dewarick Spencer	Le Mans
March	(Turkey) Bobby Dixon	Le Mans
April	(Dominican Republic) Ricardo Greer	Nancy
