= LNB Élite Best Young Player =

The LNB Élite Best Young Player Award (French: Meilleur Jeune de LNB Pro A) is an annual LNB Pro A award given to the top player under the age of 22 years old.

Antoine Rigaudeau and Victor Wembanyama jointly hold the record for most awards as they both won three awards.

== Winners ==
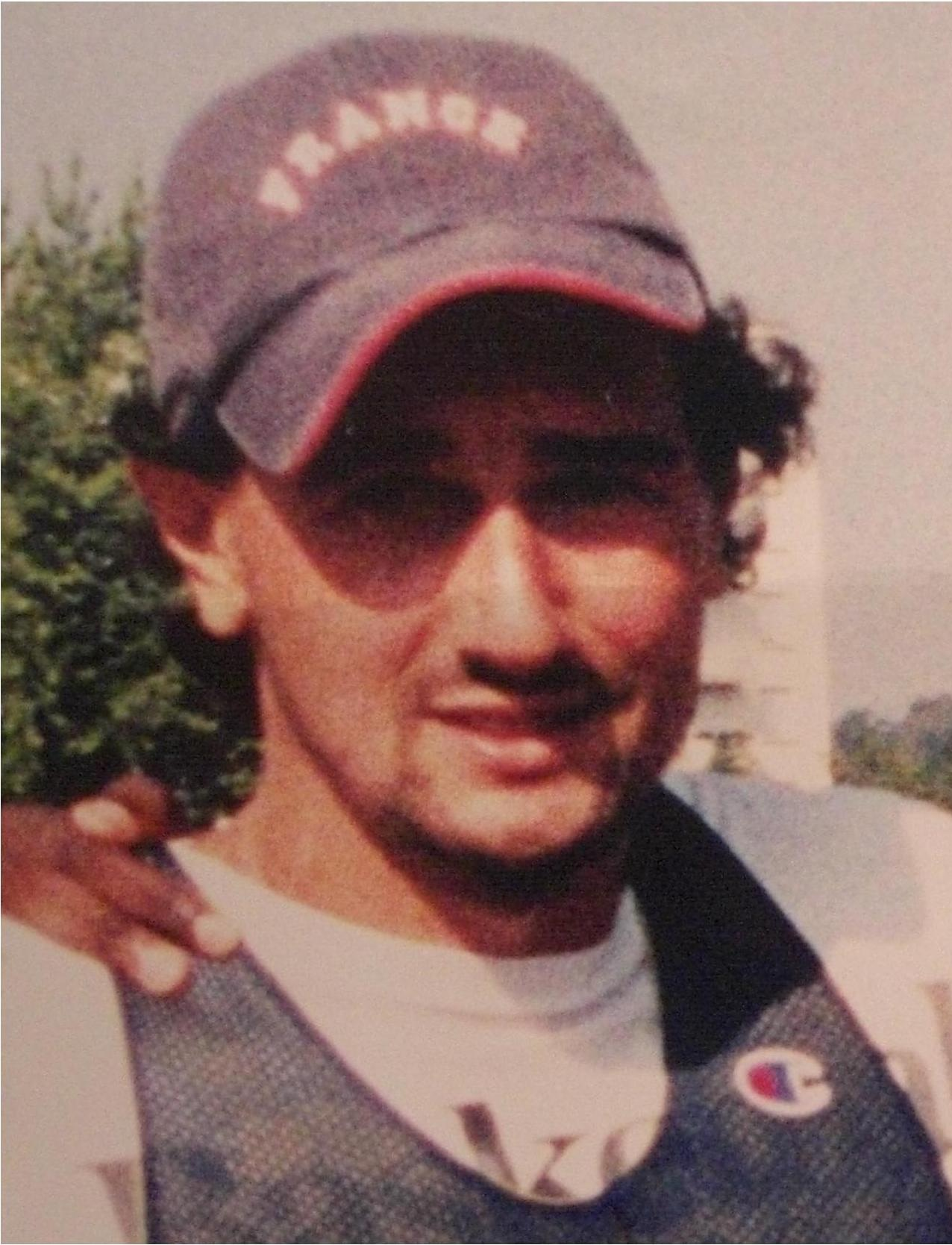
Yann Bonato won the award in 1993

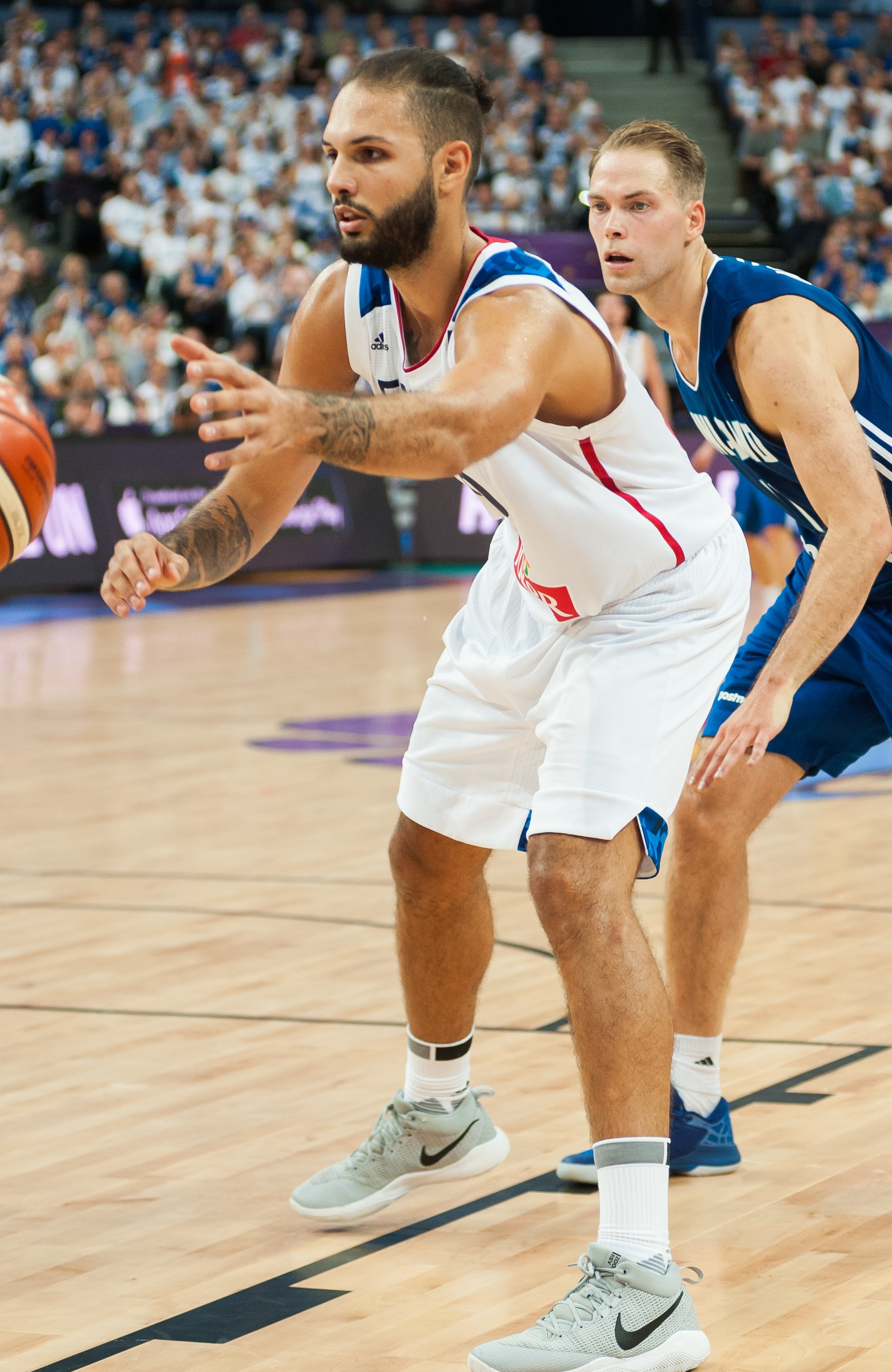
Guard Evan Fournier won the award in 2011 and 2012

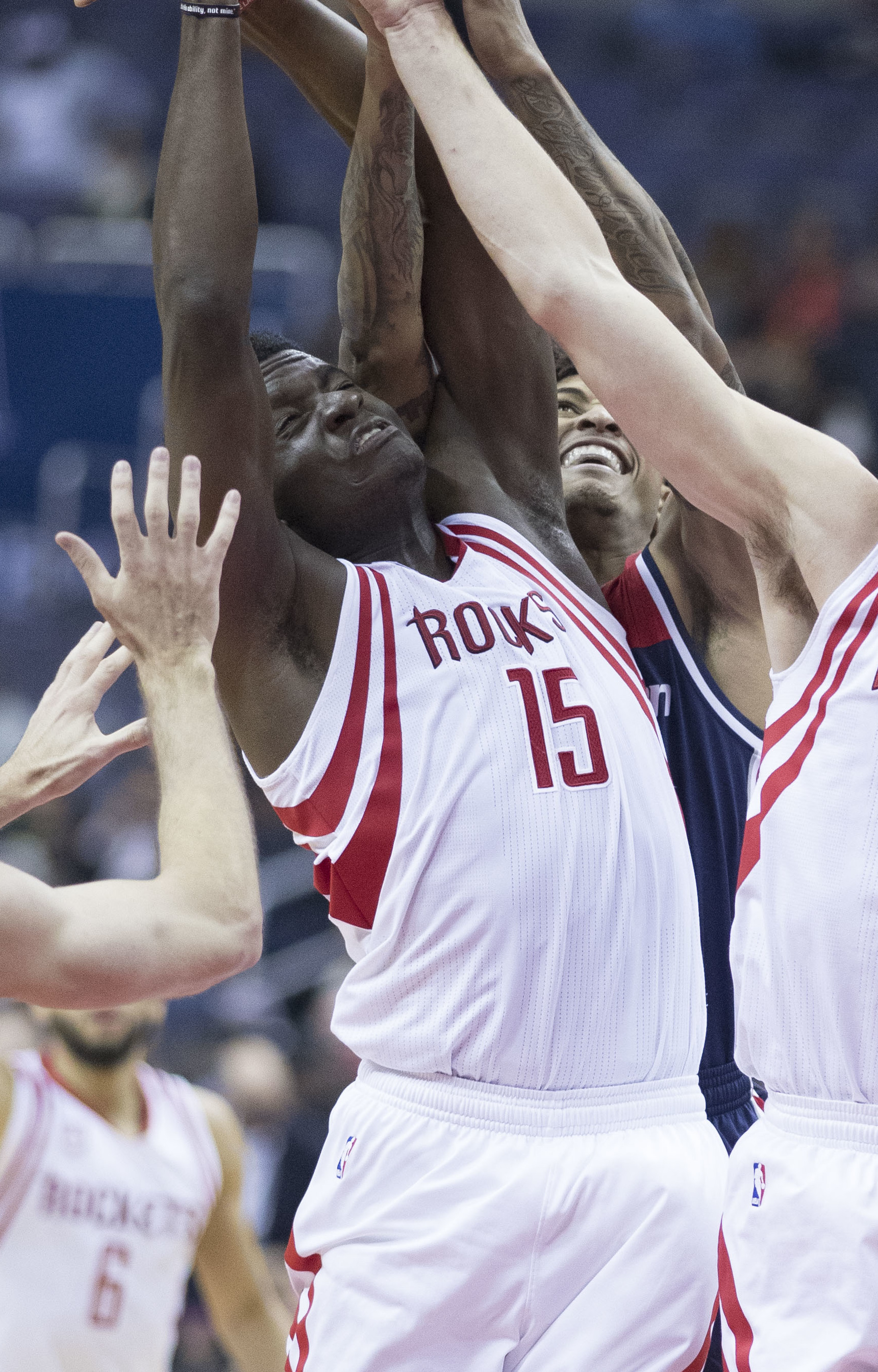
Clint Capela was the first Swiss player to win the award in 2014

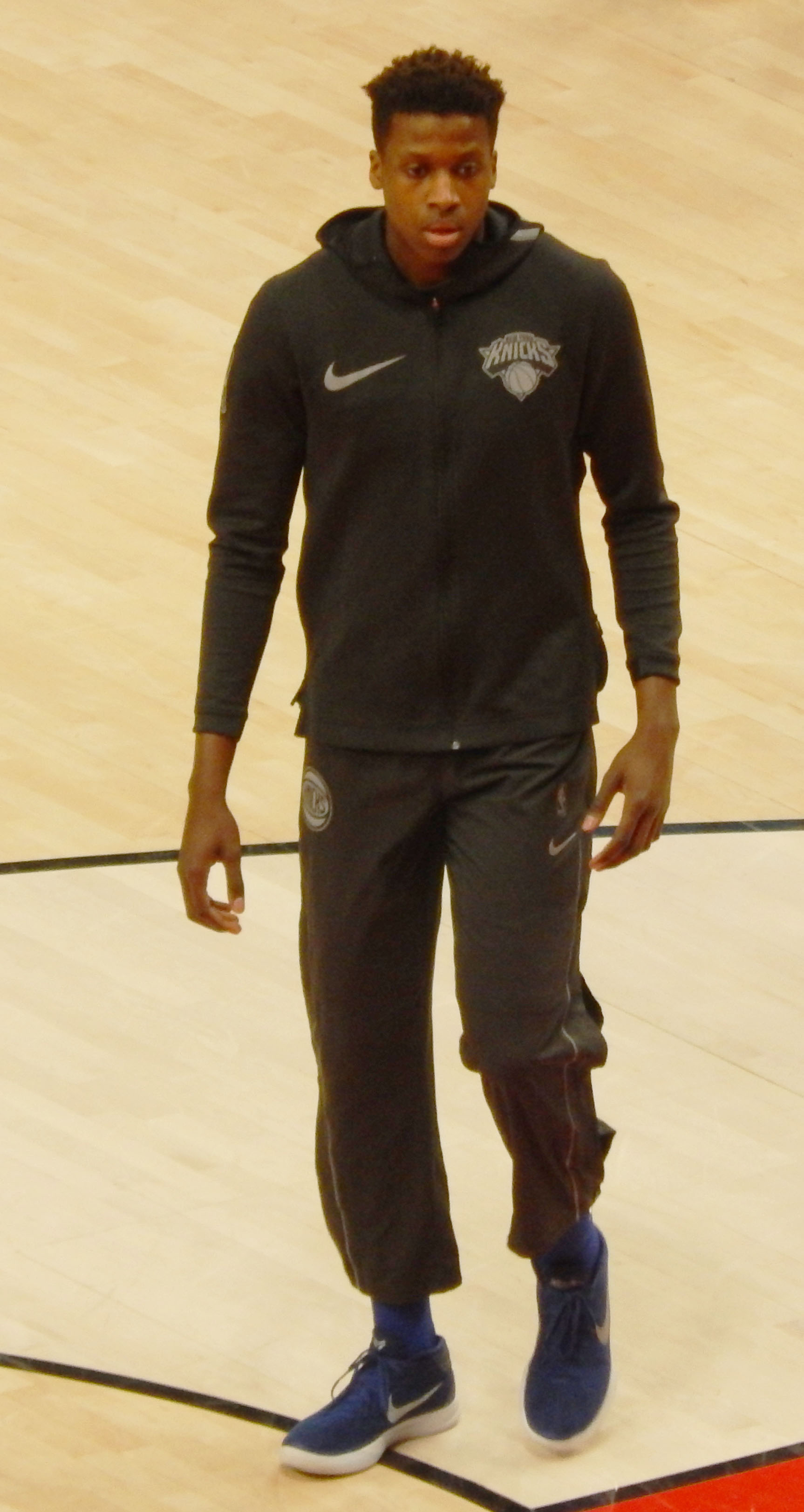
Frank Ntilikina won the award in 2017 and 2018

| ^ | Denotes player who is still active in the Pro A |
| * | Inducted into the FIBA Hall of Fame or the French Basketball Academy |
| Player (X) | Denotes the number of times the player has received the award |

| Season | Player | Position | Nationality | Team |
|---|---|---|---|---|
| 1982–83 | Valéry Demory | Guard | France | Stade Français |
| 1983–84 | Stéphane Ostrowski* | Forward | France | Le Mans |
| 1984–85 | Valéry Demory (2) | Guard | France | Stade Français |
| 1985–86 | Christian Garnier | Forward | France | Monaco |
| 1986–87 | Didier Gadou | Forward | France | Pau-Orthez |
| 1987–88 | Hugues Occansey | Forward | France | Limoges CSP |
| 1988–89 | Jim Bilba | Forward | France | Cholet |
| 1989–90 | Antoine Rigaudeau* | Guard | France | Cholet |
| 1990–91 | Antoine Rigaudeau* (2) | Guard | France | Cholet |
| 1991–92 | Antoine Rigaudeau* (3) | Guard | France | Cholet |
| 1992–93 | Yann Bonato | Forward | France | Olympique Antibes |
| 1993–94 | Alain Digbeu | Forward | France | ASVEL |
| 1994–95 | Alain Digbeu (2) | Forward | France | ASVEL |
| 1995–96 | Fabien Dubos | Forward | France | Pau-Orthez |
| 1996–97 | Frédéric Weis | Center | France | Limoges CSP |
| 1997–98 | Willem Laure | Forward | France | JDA Dijon |
| 1998–99 | Frédéric Weis (2) | Center | France | Limoges CSP |
| 1999–2000 | David Gautier | Forward | France | Cholet |
| 2000–01 | Tony Parker | Guard | France | Racing Paris |
| 2001–02 | Boris Diaw | Forward | France | Élan Béarnais Pau-Orthez |
| 2002–03 | Pape-Philippe Amagou | Guard | Ivory Coast (Note: Amagou, born in Maisons-Laffitte, also owns the French nationality.) | Le Mans |
| 2003–04 | Pape-Philippe Amagou (2) | Guard | Ivory Coast | Le Mans |
| 2004–05 | Michael Mokongo | Guard | Central Africa (Note: Michael Mokongo, born in Bimbo, Central African Republic, also owns the French nationality.) | Élan Chalon |
| 2005–06 | Ian Mahinmi | Center | France | STB Le Havre |
| 2006–07 | Nicolas Batum | Forward | France | Le Mans |
| 2007–08 | Nicolas Batum (2) | Forward | France | Le Mans |
| 2008–09 | Thomas Heurtel | Guard | France | Élan Béarnais Pau-Lacq-Orthez |
| 2009–10 | Andrew Albicy | Guard | France | Paris-Levallois |
| 2010–11 | Evan Fournier | Guard | France | Poitiers |
| 2011–12 | Evan Fournier (2) | Guard | France | Poitiers |
| 2012–13 | Livio Jean-Charles | Forward | France | ASVEL |
| 2013–14 | Clint Capela | Center | Switzerland | Cholet |
| 2014–15 | Petr Cornelie | Forward | France | Le Mans |
| 2015–16 | Frank Ntilikina | Guard | France | SIG Strasbourg |
| 2016–17 | Frank Ntilikina (2) | Guard | France | SIG Strasbourg |
| 2017–18 | Adam Mokoka^ | Guard | France | BCM Gravelines |
| 2018–19 | Théo Maledon | Guard | France | LDLC ASVEL |
| 2019–20 | Not awarded (Note: There was no awarding in the 2019–20, because the season was cancelled due to the coronavirus pandemic in Europe.) | | | |
| 2020–21 | Victor Wembanyama^ | Center | France | Nanterre 92 |
| 2021–22 | Victor Wembanyama (2)^ | Center | France | LDLC ASVEL |
| 2022–23 | Victor Wembanyama (3)^ | Center | France | Metropolitans 92 |
| 2023–24 | Zaccharie Risacher | Forward | France | JL Bourg |
| 2024–25 | Noah Penda | Forward | France | Le Mans |
| 2025–26 | Hugo Yimga-Moukouri | Forward | France | Nanterre 92 |

== Awards by player ==
| Player | Total |
|---|---|
| Antoine Rigaudeau | 3 |
| Victor Wembanyama | 3 |
| Alain Digbeu | 2 |
| Pape-Philippe Amagou | 2 |
| Evan Fournier | 2 |
| Frank Ntilikina | 2 |
| Frédéric Weis | 2 |

== Awards by nationality ==
| Player | Total |
|---|---|
| France | 38 |
| Ivory Coast | 2 |
| Switzerland | 1 |
| Central Africa | 1 |
