= 2016 LNB All-Star Game =

- Event: 2016–17 Pro A season
French Players	Foreign Players
129	130
- Date: 29 December 2016
- Venue: AccorHotels Arena, Paris
- MVP: (United States) John Roberson

2016 LNB All-Star Game was the French All-Star Game event of the LNB Pro A as a part of the 2016–17 Pro A season. The event took place on 29 December 2016 and the game was played at the AccorHotels Arena in Paris. The Foreign Team won the game 129–130 and John Roberson of Élan Chalon was named All-Star Game MVP.

== All-Star Game ==
(France) Team National
Pos	Player	Team
Starters
G	Axel Julien	JDA Dijon
F	Billy Ouattara	AS Monaco
F	William Howard	Hyères-Toulon
C	Will Yeguete	Le Mans
C	Moustapha Fall	Élan Chalon
Reserves
G	Edouard Choquet	Châlons-Reims
G	Paul Lacombe	SIG Strasbourg
G	Jérémy Nzeulie	Élan Chalon
F	Nicolas Lang	ASVEL
F	Ousmane Camara	Limoges CSP
F	Alain Koffi	Pau-Lacq-Orthez
C	Vincent Poirier	Paris-Levallois
Head coach: (Montenegro) Zvezdan Mitrović (AS Monaco)

Team International
Pos	Player	Team
Starters
G	(United States) D.J. Cooper	Pau-Lacq-Orthez
G	(United States) Spencer Butterfield	Nanterre 92
F	(Ukraine) Sergiy Gladyr	AS Monaco
F	(United States) Tim Blue	Antibes Sharks
C	(United States) Darryl Watkins	ASVEL
Reserves
G	(United States Virgin Islands) Walter Hodge	ASVEL
G	(United States) John Roberson	Élan Chalon
G	(United States) Jason Rich	Paris-Levallois
F	(United States) Mark Payne	Châlons-Reims
F	(United States) Cameron Clark	Élan Chalon
F	(United States) Jakim Donaldson	ESSM Le Portel
C	(United States) Dario Hunt	SLUC Nancy
Head coach: (France) Jean-Denys Choulet (Élan Chalon)

=== Game ===
29 December 2016	French Players	129–130	Foreign Players	Paris
19:00	Scoring by quarter: 34–32, 35–39, 31–34, 29–25
	Pts: Yeguete 21; Rebs: Yeguete 8 Asts: Lang 9 PIR: Yeguete 33	Boxscore	Pts: Blue 21; Rebs: Watkins 8 Asts: Cooper 11; PIR: Blue 28	Arena: AccorHotels Arena; Referees: Hosselet / Hamzaoui / Dubois
