= 2010–11 Pro A season =

French basketball championship

- Season: 2010–11
- Teams: 18

Regular season
- Relegated: JA Vichy; Limoges CSP

Finals
- Champions: SLUC Nancy (2nd title)
- Runners-up: Cholet Basket
- Finals MVP: (United States) John Linehan

Awards
- Foreign MVP: (Dominican Republic) Sammy Mejia
- Domestic MVP: (France) Mickaël Gelabale

The 2010–11 LNB Pro A season was the 89th season of the French Basketball Championship and the 24th season since inception of the Ligue Nationale de Basketball (LNB). The regular season started on October 9, 2010, and ended on May 10, 2011. The play-offs were held from May 17, 2011, till June 11, 2011.
SLUC Nancy became the 2010–11 Pro A champions and gained its second French League title after beating defending champion Cholet Basket in the single-game Final, with a score of 74–76.

== Promotion and relegation ==
At the beginning of the 2010–11 season

Teams promoted from 2009 to 2010 Pro B (French 2nd division)

- Pau-Lacq-Orthez
- Limoges

Teams relegated to 2010-11 Pro B

- Dijon
- Rouen

At the end of the 2010–11 season

- 2010-11 Pro A Champion: Nancy

Teams promoted from 2010 to 2011 Pro B

- Nanterre
- Dijon

Teams relegated to 2011–12 Pro B

- Vichy
- Limoges

== Team Arenas ==
Location of teams in Pro A League 2010–11

Team	Home city	Stadium	Capacity
ÉS Chalon-sur-Saône	Chalon-sur-Saône	Le Colisée	5,000
Cholet Basket	Cholet	La Meilleraie	5,191
BCM Gravelines Dunkerque	Gravelines	Sportica	3,500
Hyères Toulon Var Basket	Hyères – Toulon	Palais des Sports de Toulon; Espace 3000	4,700; 2,200
STB Le Havre	Le Havre	Salle des Docks Océane	3,598
Le Mans Sarthe Basket	Le Mans	Antarès	6,003
CSP Limoges	Limoges	Palais des Sports de Fetes	5,516
ASVEL Basket	Lyon – Villeurbanne	Astroballe	5,643
SLUC Nancy Basket	Nancy	Palais des Sports Jean Weille	6,027
Orléans Loiret Basket	Orléans	Zénith d'Orléans	5,338
Paris-Levallois Basket	Paris – Levallois	Stade Pierre de Coubertin; Palais des Sports Marcel Cerdan	4,200; 4,000
Élan Béarnais Pau-Lacq-Orthez	Pau-Orthez	Palais des Sports de Pau	7,813
Poitiers Basket 86	Poitiers	Les Arènes	4,300
Chorale Roanne Basket	Roanne	Halle André Vacheresse	5,020
Strasbourg IG	Strasbourg	Rhénus Sport	6,200
JA Vichy	Vichy	Palais des Sports Pierre Coulon	3,300

== Team standings ==
Clinched playoff berth
Relegated

#	Team	Pld	W	L	PF	PA
1	Cholet	30	22	8	2217	2069
2	Nancy	30	21	9	2272	2207
3	Chalon-sur-Saône	30	20	10	2269	2155
4	Gravelines-Dunkerque	30	20	10	2223	2006
5	Roanne	30	18	12	2279	2185
6	Lyon-Villeurbanne	30	17	13	2277	2243
7	Hyères-Toulon	30	15	15	2235	2252
8	Le Mans	30	14	16	2154	2104
9	Pau-Lacq-Orthez	30	13	17	2164	2234
10	Orléans	30	12	18	2083	2086
11	Strasbourg	30	12	18	2116	2208
12	STB Le Havre	30	12	18	2133	2169
13	Paris-Levallois	30	12	18	2157	2335
14	Poitiers	30	12	18	2065	2167
15	Vichy	30	11	19	2060	2179
16	Limoges	30	9	21	2163	2268

== Playoffs ==
Quarter Finals
1	Cholet	2
8	Le Mans	0
4	Gravelines-Dunkerque	2
5	Roanne	1
2	Nancy	2
7	Hyères-Toulon	1
3	Chalon-sur-Saône	1
6	Lyon-Villeurbanne	2

Semifinals
1	Cholet	2
4	Gravelines-Dunkerque	0
2	Nancy	2
6	Lyon-Villeurbanne	1

Finals
1	Cholet	74
2	Nancy	76

== Stats Leaders ==
Statistic	Player	Team	Average
Points per Game	(United States) Rick Hughes	Hyères-Toulon	19.10
Ranking per Game	(United States) fr:Chris Massie	Limoges	21.28
Rebounds per Game	(United States) fr:Chris Massie	Limoges	9.20
Assists per Game	(United States) Teddy Gipson	Pau-Lacq-Orthez	5.87
Steals per Game	(United States) John Linehan	Nancy	3.08
Blocks per Game	(France) Cyril Akpomedah	Gravelines-Dunkerque	2.00

== Awards ==
=== Regular season MVPs ===
- "Foreign" MVP: (Dominican Republic) Sammy Mejia (Cholet)
- "French" MVP: (France) Mickaël Gelabale (Lyon-Villeurbanne)

=== Finals MVP ===
- (United States) John Linehan (Nancy)

=== Best Coach ===
- (France) – (Turkey) Erman Kunter (Cholet)

=== Most Improved Player ===
- (France) Evan Fournier (Poitiers)

=== Best Defensive Player ===
- (United States) John Linehan (Nancy)

=== Rising Star Award ===
- (France) Evan Fournier (Poitiers)

=== Player of the month ===
Month	Player	Team
November	(France) Yannick Bokolo	Gravelines-Dunkerque
December	(United States) Tremmell Darden	Nancy
January	(Czech Republic) Blake Schilb	Chalon-sur-Saône
February	(United States) Tremmell Darden	Nancy
March	(United Kingdom) Pops Mensah-Bonsu	Lyon-Villeurbanne
April	(Dominican Republic) Sammy Mejia	Cholet
