= 2009–10 Pro A season =

2009–10 LNB Pro A season
- League: LNB Pro A
- Sport: Basketball
- Games: 240 (regular season)
- Teams: 16
- TV partner: Sport+

Regular Season
- Top seed: Cholet Basket
- Season MVP: (Dominican Republic) Ricardo Greer (SLUC Nancy) (France) Ali Traore (ASVEL)
- Top scorer: (Nigeria) Derrick Obasohan (Hyères-Toulon)

2009-10 Finals
- Champions: Cholet Basket
- Runners-up: Le Mans SB
- Finals MVP: (France) Mickaël Gelabale

LNB Pro A seasons
- ← 2008–09 2010–11 →

The 2009–10 LNB Pro A season was the 88th season of the French Basketball Championship and the 23rd season since inception of the Ligue Nationale de Basketball (LNB). The regular season started on October 3, 2009 and ended on May 11, 2010. The play-offs were held from May 18, 2010 till June 13, 2010.

Cholet Basket, after finishing first of the regular season, won the French Pro A League by defeating Le Mans SB in playoffs final (81-65).

== Promotion and relegation ==
At the beginning of the 2009–10 season

Teams promoted from 2008 to 2009 Pro B (French 2nd division)

- Poitiers
- Paris-Levallois

Teams relegated to 2009–10 Pro B

- Besançon
- Pau-Orthez

At the end of the 2009–10 season

- 2009-10 Pro A Champion: Cholet Basket

Teams promoted from 2009 to 2010 Pro B

- Pau-Lacq-Orthez
- Limoges

Teams relegated to 2010–11 Pro B

- Rouen
- Dijon

== Team arenas ==
Location of teams in Pro A League 2010–11

Team	Home city	Stadium	Capacity
ÉS Chalon-sur-Saône	Chalon-sur-Saône	Le Colisée	5,000
Cholet Basket	Cholet	La Meilleraie	5,191
JDA Dijon	Dijon	Palais des Sports Jean-Michel Geoffroy	5,000
BCM Gravelines Dunkerque	Gravelines	Sportica	3,500
Hyères Toulon Var Basket	Hyères – Toulon	Palais des Sports de Toulon; Espace 3000	4,700; 2,200
STB Le Havre	Le Havre	Salle des Docks Océane	3,598
Le Mans Sarthe Basket	Le Mans	Antarès	6,003
ASVEL Basket	Lyon – Villeurbanne	Astroballe	5,643
SLUC Nancy Basket	Nancy	Palais des Sports Jean Weille	6,027
Orléans Loiret Basket	Orléans	Zénith d'Orléans	5,338
Paris-Levallois Basket	Paris – Levallois	Stade Pierre de Coubertin; Palais des Sports Marcel Cerdan	4,200; 4,000
Poitiers Basket 86	Poitiers	Les Arènes	4,300
Chorale Roanne Basket	Roanne	Halle André Vacheresse	5,020
SPO Rouen Basket	Rouen	Salle des Cotonniers	1,300
Strasbourg IG	Strasbourg	Rhénus Sport	6,200
JA Vichy	Vichy	Palais des Sports Pierre Coulon	3,300

== Team standings ==
Clinched playoff berth
Relegated

#	Team	Pld	W	L	PF	PA
1	Cholet	30	23	7	2296	2125
2	Le Mans	30	22	8	2390	2151
3	Roanne	30	21	9	2490	2324
4	Gravelines-Dunkerque	30	20	10	2322	2254
5	Nancy	30	19	11	2431	2212
6	Orléans	30	18	12	2331	2168
7	Paris-Levallois	30	15	15	2378	2370
8	Poitiers	30	15	15	2183	2223
9	Lyon-Villeurbanne	30	14	16	2233	2127
10	Vichy	30	13	17	2140	2111
11	Hyères Toulon	30	13	17	2441	2506
12	Chalon-sur-Saône	30	12	18	2343	2412
13	Le Havre	30	10	20	2223	2466
14	Strasbourg	30	10	20	2412	2542
15	Rouen	30	8	22	2290	2521
16	Dijon	30	7	23	2172	2563

== Playoffs ==
Quarter Finals
1	Cholet	2
8	Poitiers	0
4	Gravelines-Dunkerque	2
5	Nancy	0
2	Le Mans	2
7	Paris-Levallois	0
3	Roanne	2
6	Orléans	1

Semifinals
1	Cholet	2
4	Gravelines-Dunkerque	1
2	Le Mans	2
3	Roanne	1

Finals
1	Cholet	81
2	Le Mans	65

== Stats Leaders ==
Statistic	Player	Team	Average
Points per Game	(Nigeria) Derrick Obasohan	Hyères-Toulon	19.8
Ranking per Game	(Dominican Republic) Ricardo Greer	Nancy	21.6
Rebounds per Game	(Senegal) Saer Sene	Hyères-Toulon	11.4
Assists per Game	(United States) Kareem Reid	Vichy	7.8
Steals per Game	(United States) John Linehan	Cholet	2.8
Blocks per Game	(Senegal) Saer Sene	Hyères-Toulon	2.4

== Awards ==
=== Regular season MVPs ===
- Foreign MVP: (Dominican Republic) Ricardo Greer (Nancy)
- French MVP: (France) Ali Traore (Lyon-Villeurbanne)

=== Finals MVP ===
- (France) Mickaël Gelabale (Cholet)

=== Best Coach ===
- (France) Ruddy Nelhomme (Poitiers)

=== Most Improved Player ===
- (France) Kevin Seraphin (Cholet)

=== Best Defensive Player ===
- (United States) John Linehan (Cholet)

=== Rising Star Award ===
- (France) Andrew Albicy (Paris-Levallois)

=== Player of the month ===
Month	Player	Team
October	(United States) Sean Marshall	Dijon
November	(Dominican Republic) Ricardo Greer	Nancy
December	(United States) Dewarick Spencer	Le Mans
January	(Dominican Republic) Sammy Mejia	Cholet
February	(United States) Cedrick Banks	Orléans
March	(United States) Ralph Mims	Roanne
April	(United States) Dylan Page	Roanne
