= Cyril Akpomedah =

French basketball player (born 1979)

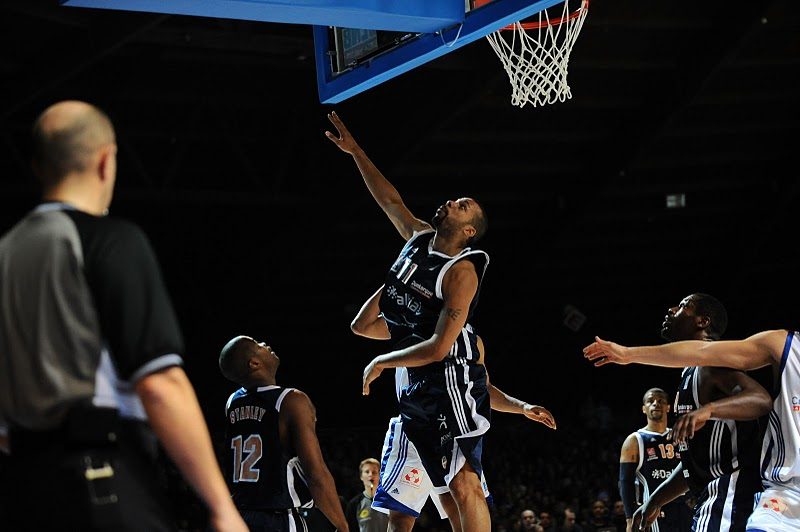
- Akpomedah with BCM Gravelines, in 2010.

Personal information
- Born: 2 May 1979 (age 47) Enghien-les-Bains, France
- Listed height: 6 ft 8 in (2.03 m)
- Listed weight: 218 lb (99 kg)

Career information
- NBA draft: 2001: undrafted
- Playing career: 1999–2016
- Position: Power forward
- Number: 11

Career history
- 1999–2003: Châlons-en-C
- 2003–2005: Cholet Basket
- 2005–2007: Spirou Charleroi
- 2007: HKK Široki
- 2007–2008: Paris-Levallois
- 2008–2014: BCM Gravelines
- 2014–2016: AS Monaco

Career highlights
- 2× French Federation Cup winner (1998, 1999); Bosnian League champion (2007); French League Cup winner (2011); 4× French League All-Star Game (2004, 2007, 2009, 2010); French 2nd Division French Player's MVP (2003)

Cyril Akpomedah (born 2 May 1979) is a French former professional basketball player.

== Youth career ==
- 1997–99: (France) Cholet Basket (Youth championship)

== Professional career ==
During his pro career, Akpomedah played in the top-tier level French League, with AS Monaco.

== National team career ==
Akpomedah was a member of the senior French national team, in 2005.

== Awards and honors ==
- French League Cup Winner: (2011)
- 2× French Federation Cup Winner: (1998, 1999)
- Bosnia and Herzegovina League Champion: (2007)
- 4× French League All-Star: (2004, 2007, 2009, 2010)
- French League blocks leader: (2011)
