= Yohann Sangaré =

French basketball player

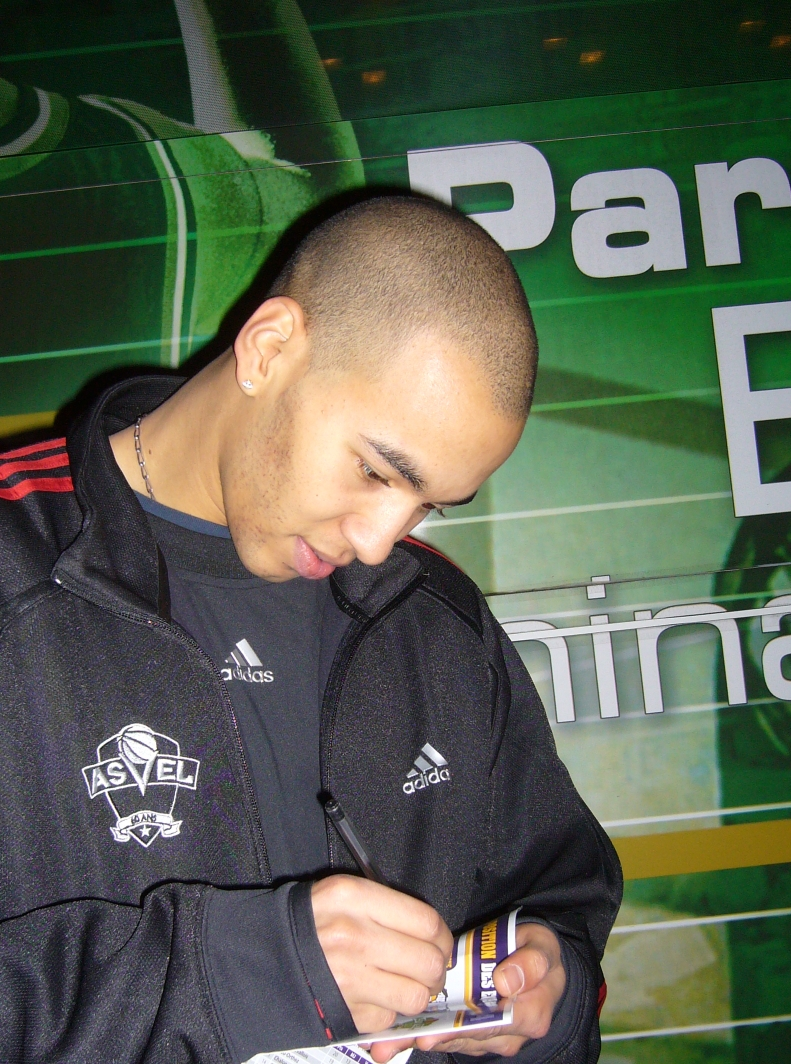
- Yohann Sangaré

Personal information
- Born: 5 April 1983 (age 43) Poissy, France
- Listed height: 6 ft 4 in (1.93 m)
- Listed weight: 180 lb (82 kg)

Career information
- Playing career: 2001–2015
- Position: Point guard / shooting guard

Career history
- 2001–2002: Grupo AZ Ferrol
- 2002–2003: CB Valladolid
- 2003: Melilla Baloncesto
- 2003–2004: UB La Palma
- 2004–2008: ASVEL Basket
- 2008–2009: Armani Jeans Milano
- 2009–2010: Carife Ferrara
- 2010–2011: STB Le Havre
- 2011–2012: Orléans Loiret Basket
- 2012–2014: Chorale Roanne Basket
- 2014–2015: ASVEL Basket

Career highlights
- 3x French League All-Star (2006–2008)

Yohann Sangaré (born 5 April 1983) is a French former professional basketball player.

== Professional career ==
Sangare played in French League for ASVEL Basket, STB Le Havre, Orléans Loiret Basket and Chorale Roanne Basket. He also played two seasons in Italian Lega Basket Serie A for Armani Jeans Milano and Carife Ferrara.

== National team ==
Sangaré played for the France national basketball team at the FIBA EuroBasket 2007.
