= Stéphane Risacher =

French basketball player

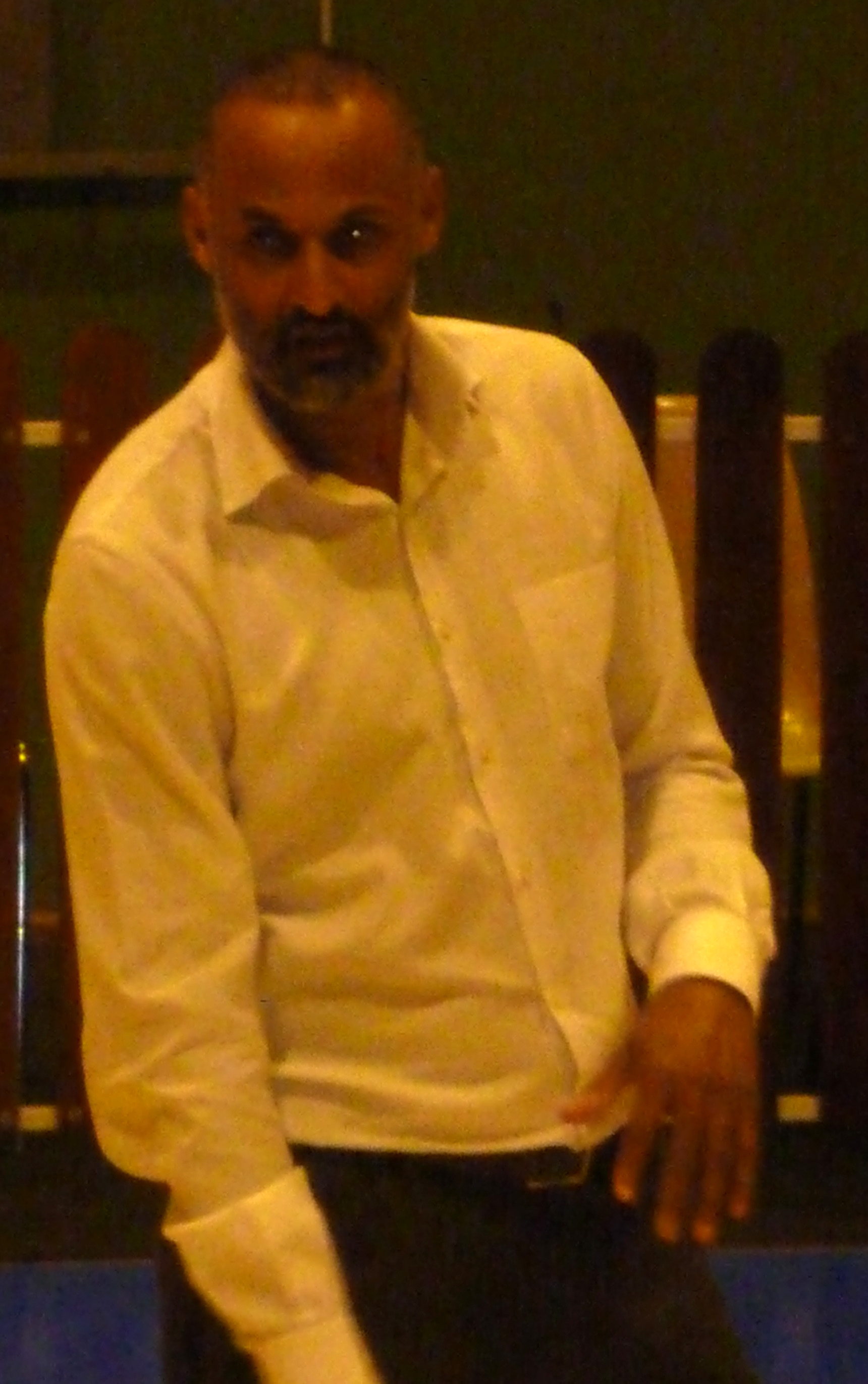
- Risacher, in Clermont-Ferrand, on March 23rd, 2013.

Personal information
- Born: August 26, 1972 (age 54) Moulins, Allier, France
- Listed height: 6 ft 8 in (2.03 m)
- Listed weight: 220 lb (100 kg)

Career information
- Playing career: 1987–2010
- Position: Small forward / power forward
- Number: 10

Career history
- 1987–1988: Stade Clermontois
- 1988–1989: JA Vichy
- 1989–1990: Tours
- 1990–1994: CRO Lyon
- 1994–1999: PSG Racing
- 1999–2000: Pau Orthez
- 2000–2002: Olympiacos Piraeus
- 2002–2006: Málaga
- 2006–2008: Murcia
- 2008–2010: Élan Chalon

Career highlights
- Spanish League champion (2006); Spanish Cup winner (2005); Greek Cup winner (2002); Greek League All-Star (2001); French League champion (1997); 6× French League All-Star (1995–1998, 2000, 2008); French League All-Star Game MVP (1997); French 2nd Division champion (1991); French Basketball Hall of Fame (2019)
Medals
Men's basketball
Representing France
Summer Olympic Games
| Silver medal – second place | 2000 Sydney |
FIBA Under-21 World Cup
| Silver medal – second place | 1993 Spain |

Stéphane Rémy Daniel Risacher (born 26 August 1972) is a French former professional basketball player. During his pro club career, he was a six-time French League All-Star, as well as the French League All-Star Game's MVP in 1997. He was also a long-time member of the senior French national team. He was inducted into the French Basketball Hall of Fame in 2019.

== Youth career ==
Risacher played youth club basketball with INSEP's Centre Fédéral.

== Professional career ==
Risacher began his pro basketball club career in 1987, with the French club Stade Clermontois BA. Risacher won the French Second Division league championship in 1991, with CRO Lyon. He also won the French First Division league championship in 1997, with Paris Saint Germain.

With the Greek Basket League club Olympiacos Piraeus, he won the Greek Cup title in 2002. With the Spanish club Málaga, he won the Spanish Cup title in 2005, and the Spanish ACB League championship in 2006. Risacher played in Europe's top-tier basketball competition, the EuroLeague, in a total of eight different seasons (1997–98, 1999–00,2000–01, 2001–02, 2002–03, 2003–04, 2004–05, and 2005–06). He retired from playing professional basketball in 2010, after ending his career with the French club Élan Chalon.

== National team career ==
=== French junior national team ===
Risacher was a member of the French junior national teams. With France's junior national team, he played at the 1989 FIBA Europe Under-16 Championship, and at the 1990 FIBA Europe Under-18 Championship. He also won the silver medal at the 1993 FIBA Under-21 World Cup.

=== French senior national team ===
Risacher was also a member of the senior men's French national team. With France, he played at the 1993 FIBA EuroBasket, the 1997 FIBA EuroBasket, the 1999 FIBA EuroBasket, the 2000 Summer Olympic Games, and the 2001 FIBA EuroBasket. He won a silver medal with France, at the 2000 Summer Olympics.

== Personal life ==
Risacher is of Martiniquais descent through his parents. His son, Zaccharie, and his daughter, Aïnhoa, are also basketball players. Zaccharie was selected with the first overall pick of the 2024 NBA draft by the Atlanta Hawks.
