= Dock Océane =

Indoor sporting arena in Le Havre, France

Coordinates: 49.491116°N 0.132641°E

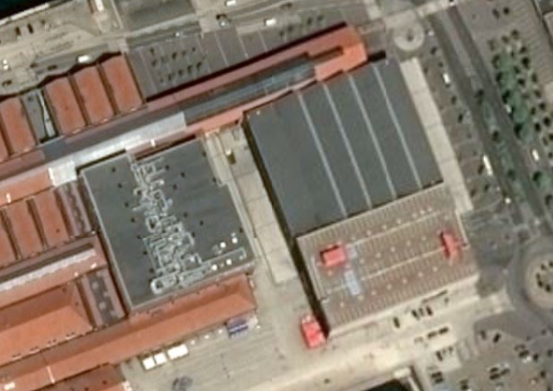
- Interactive map of Dock Océane

Dock Océane is an indoor sporting arena located in Le Havre, France. The capacity of the arena is 3,598 people. It is currently home to the STB Le Havre basketball team. It is located near Le Havre AC's Stade Océane.

== History ==
The area was created following a revitalisation of the docklands district.

== Sport ==
Dock Océane is home to Le Havre's two basketball clubs, STB Le Havre and HAC Handball.

=== Basketball ===
STB Le Havre has been playing at Docks Océane since the venue opened in 2000.

=== Handball ===
HAC Handball plays its major French championship and European cup matches at Docks Océane.
