= Yann Bonato =

French basketball player (born 1972)

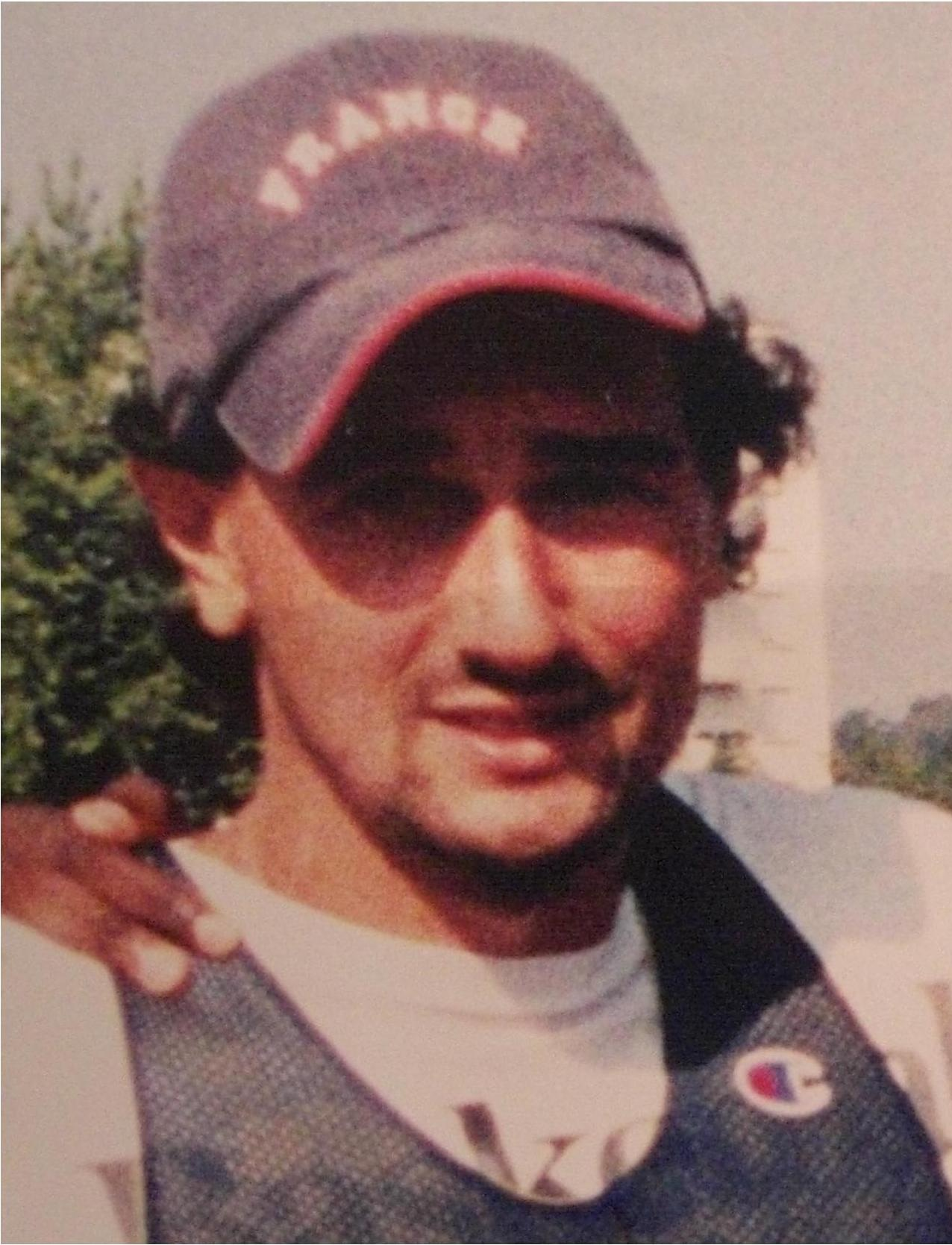
- Bonato in 2003

Personal information
- Born: 4 March 1972 (age 54) Cannes, France
- Listed height: 6 ft 7.5 in (2.02 m)
- Listed weight: 210 lb (95 kg)

Career information
- College: VCU (1990–1991)
- NBA draft: 1994: undrafted
- Playing career: 1991–2004
- Position: Shooting guard / small forward

Career history
- 1991–1993: Olympique Antibes
- 1993–1995: PSG Racing
- 1995–1997: CSP Limoges
- 1997–1998: VL Pesaro
- 1998–1999: Reggiana
- 1999–2000: CSP Limoges
- 2000–2003: ASVEL Lyon-Villeurbanne
- 2003–2004: CSP Limoges

Career highlights
- FIBA EuroStar (1996); FIBA Korać Cup champion (2000); 2× French League champion (2000, 2002); 2× French Federation Cup winner (2000, 2001); 2× French League French Player's MVP (1995, 1997); 4× French League All-Star (1994–1996, 2000); French Basketball Hall of Fame (2015); Italian League All-Star (1998)
Medals
Representing France
Men's basketball
Summer Olympics
Silver medal – second place	2000 Sydney

Yann Jean Claude Bonato (born 4 March 1972 in Cannes) is a former professional basketball player from France, who won the silver medal at the 2000 Summer Olympics with the senior French men's national team. He was inducted into the French Basketball Hall of Fame in 2015.

== College career ==
Bonato played college basketball for the Virginia Commonwealth Rams.

== Professional career ==
After college, Bonato moved back to France, where he played for several different teams, such as CSP Limoges and ASVEL Basket. He was twice elected the Most Valuable French Player in the French League, in 1995 and 1997. He also played two seasons in Italy.

== National team career ==
Bonato played with the senior men's French national basketball team in 92 caps. With France, he played at the 1993 EuroBasket, the 1995 EuroBasket, the 1997 EuroBasket, and the 2000 Summer Olympics, where he won a silver medal.
