= Bangaly Kaba =

French basketball player

Personal information
- Nationality: French
- Born: 17 February 1959 (age 66); Dakar, Senegal

Sport
- Sport: Basketball

Bangaly Kaba (born 17 February 1959) is a French basketball player. He competed in the men's tournament at the 1984 Summer Olympics.
