= Éric Occansey =

French basketball player (born 1954)

Éric Occansey (born 17 August 1954 in Jœuf) is a French basketball player who played 44 times for the France men's national basketball team between 1986 and 1989.
