= Laurent Cazalon =

French basketball player

Laurent Cazalon (born 1 October 1979 in Mulhouse) is a retired French former professional basketball player.

== Professional career ==
Cazalon was the French 2nd Division French Player's MVP in 2001.

== National team career ==
Cazalon played in six games with the senior men's French national basketball team, in 2008.
