= Amara Sy =

Malian-French basketball player

Personal information
- Born: 28 August 1981 (age 45) Paris, France
- Listed height: 6 ft 7.5 in (2.02 m)
- Listed weight: 220 lb (100 kg)

Career information
- NBA draft: 2003: undrafted
- Playing career: 1999–2022
- Position: Small forward
- Number: 5

Career history
- 1999–2002: ASVEL Basket
- 2002–2005: Le Mans
- 2005–2007: ASVEL Basket
- 2007–2008: AEK Athens
- 2008–2009: ASVEL Basket
- 2009–2010: Bakersfield Jam
- 2010: Murcia
- 2010–2012: Entente Orléanaise
- 2012–2015: ASVEL Basket
- 2015–2019: AS Monaco Basket
- 2019–2022: Paris Basketball

Career highlights
- French League Finals MVP (2009); 2× French League champion (2002, 2009); 2× French Federation Cup winner (2001, 2004); 3× French League Cup winner (2016, 2017, 2018); 3× French League All-Star Game MVP (2004, 2011, 2017); 7× French League All-Star (2004, 2005, 2008, 2011–2013, 2017); No. 5 retired by ASVEL

Sy in 2020

Amara Sy (born 28 August 1981) is a Malian-French former professional basketball player who played at the small forward position.

== Professional career ==
On 31 July 2015, Sy signed with AS Monaco, after a three-year run with ASVEL Basket.

== National team career ==
Sy was a member of the senior Malian national team.
