= Vincent Masingue =

French basketball player

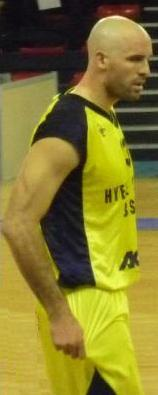
Vincent Masingue during the Pro A Championship Game against ASVEL in January 2009

Vincent Masingue, born 31 January 1976 in Saint-Martin-d'Hères, Isère, is a French former professional basketball player, who plays at N°5 (2.05 m).

== Clubs ==
- 1993-1996 : France Levallois Sporting Club Basket (Pro A)
- 1996-1997 : France AS Bondy (NM1)
- 1997-1999 : France Levallois Sporting Club Basket (Pro B)
- 1999-2001 : France Élan Béarnais Pau-Orthez (Pro A)
- 2001-2001 : France Montpellier Paillade Basket (Pro A)
- 2001-2004 : France SLUC Nancy (Pro A)
- 2005-2007 : France ASVEL Villeurbanne (Pro A)
- 2007-2008 : France Hyères Toulon Var Basket (Pro A)

== Titles ==
=== Club ===
- Winner of the Korac Cup in 2002 with Nancy
- Winner of Semaine des As in 2005 with Nancy
- Champion de France Pro B in 1998 with Levallois

=== With France ===
- 30 selections (165 points) as of 22-02-07

== Sources ==
- Maxi Basket
