= Pape-Philippe Amagou =

French–Ivorian basketball player

Personal information
- Born: 27 February 1985 (age 41) Maisons-Laffitte, Yvelines, France
- Listed height: 1.85 m (6 ft 1 in)
- Listed weight: 80 kg (176 lb)

Career information
- NBA draft: 2006: undrafted
- Playing career: 2002–2018
- Position: Point guard
- Number: 6, 7, 17

Career history
- 2002–2007: Le Mans
- 2007–2008: SLUC Nancy
- 2008–2009: Kavala
- 2009–2011: Chorale Roanne
- 2011–2012: SLUC Nancy
- 2012–2014: Chorale Roanne
- 2014–2015: Limoges CSP
- 2015–2018: Le Mans

Career highlights
- 4× Pro A champion (2006, 2008, 2015, 2018); 2× French Cup champion (2004, 2016); 2× Pro A Best Young Player (2003, 2004)
Medals
Men's basketball
Representing Ivory Coast
FIBA AfroBasket
| Silver medal – second place | 2009 Libya |

Pape-Philippe Amagou (born 27 February 1985) is a French-born Ivorian retired basketball player. During his career, he played for several teams in France and Greece and was a member of the Côte d'Ivoire national basketball team. He is a four-time Pro A champion.

== Professional career ==
In 2005–06 season, Amagou became a French national basketball champion with his team Le Mans Sarthe after previously capturing the French National Cup in 2004. Amagou also participated in the French All-Star Game in 2005 and 2006. He was an early entry candidate in the 2006 NBA draft but was not selected.

Amagou played with Kavala of the Greek League in the 2008–09 season. He averaged 8.0 points and 2.2 assists per game. From 2009 to 2012, he played with Chorale Roanne. In August 2011, he signed one-year deal with SLUC Nancy. In 2012, he returned to Chorale Roanne and stayed with them for two seasons.

In June 2014, he signed a two-year deal with Limoges CSP. In July 2015, he left Limoges and signed a three-year deal with his first-team Le Mans Sarthe.

== National team career ==
Amagou was a member of the Côte d'Ivoire team that finished second at the 2009 FIBA Africa Championship. He was named to the All-Tournament First Team after he finished with 11.4 PPG and 2.4 APG.
