= Yannick Bokolo =

French basketball player (born 1985)

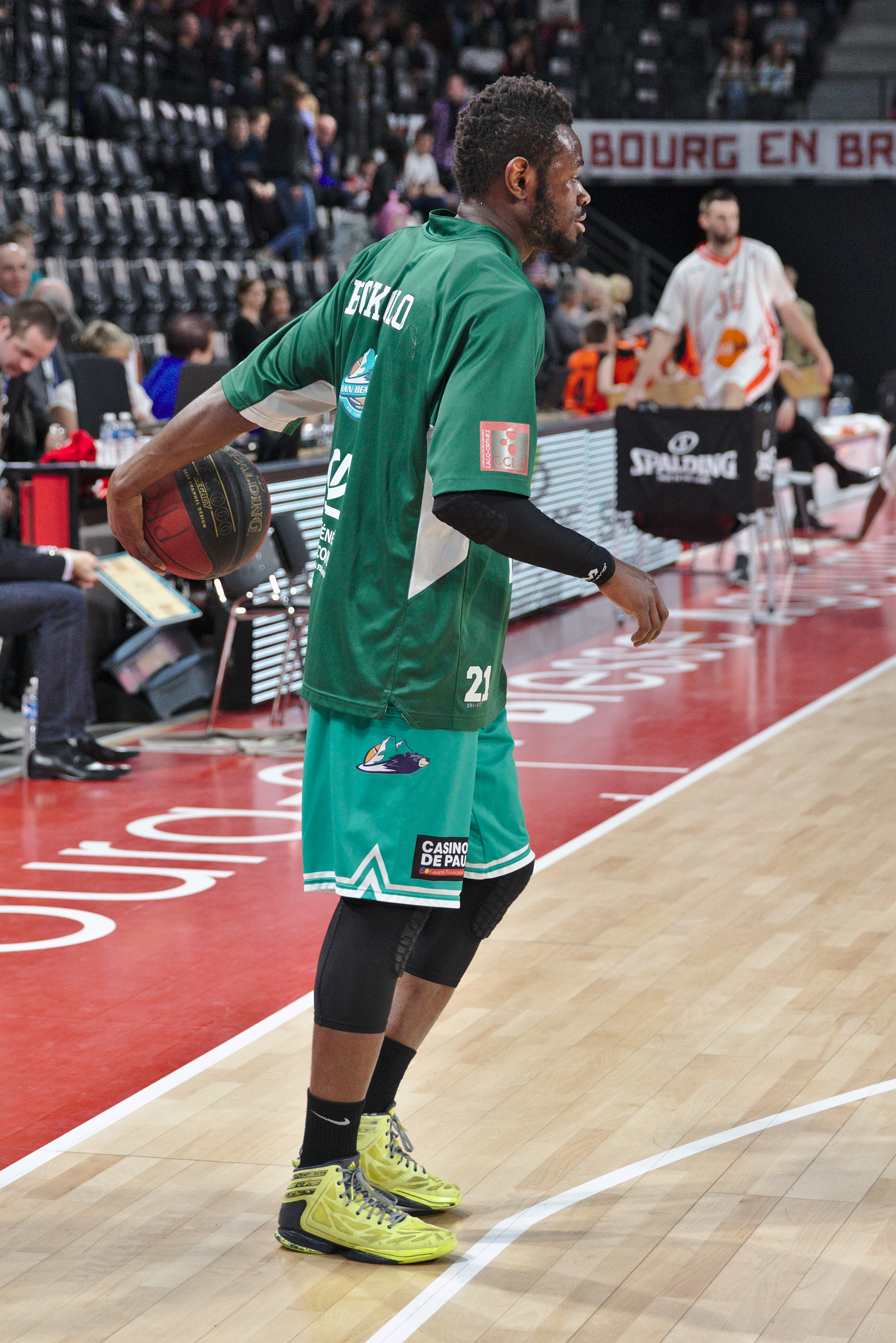
- Bokolo for Pau-Orthez in 2015

Personal information
- Born: June 19, 1985 (age 41) Kinshasa, DR Congo
- Listed height: 6 ft 3 in (1.91 m)

Career information
- Playing career: 2000–2019
- Position: Point guard / shooting guard

Career history
- 2000–2003: Centre Fédéral
- 2003–2008: Le Mans
- 2008–2014: BCM Gravelines
- 2014–2019: Élan Béarnais Pau-Orthez

Career highlights
- French League champion (2006); French Cup champion (2004); Semaine des As champion (2006); NM1 All-Star (2003); 2x Pro A All-Star (2004, 2006)

Yannick Bokolo (born June 19, 1985) is a retired French professional basketball player who last played for Élan Béarnais Pau-Orthez of the LNB Pro A.

== Biography ==
Born in Kinshasa, Zaire in 1985, Bokolo left the country aged 3 to move to Belgrade, Yugoslavia. At the age of 5, he moved to Strasbourg, France. Later, he joined the National basketball academy (INSEP), alongside Johan Petro and Terence Parker. Due to his successful international career with France youth, he then joined Le Mans, the team with whom he would win his first honors. He caught the eyes of the world with strong performances at the 2006 World Championships. After five years in Sarthe, Bokolo joined BCM Gravelines in 2008.

In May 2014, he signed a three-year deal with Élan Béarnais Pau-Orthez.

== Awards and accomplishments ==
=== Club career ===
- French Basketball Cup : 2004
- Semaine des As : 2006
- French champion :2006
- Participation in All Star Game Nationale 1 : 2003
- Participation in All Star Game : 2004 and 2006

=== French national team ===
- FIBA World Championship :
  - 5th in the 2006 FIBA World Championship in Japan
- European Championships :
  - Played in the 2005 under-20 European Championships in Russia
  - Played in the 2002 under-18 European Championships in Germany
  - Played in the 2001 under-16 European Championships in Lithuania
- Others :
  - French international since 2001
  - France A international since 6 against Belgium
