= Philippe Hervé =

French water polo player (born 1959)

Personal information
- Nationality: French
- Born: 16 April 1959 (age 66); Le Havre, France

Sport
- Sport: Water polo

Philippe Hervé (born 16 April 1959) is a French water polo player. He competed in the men's tournament at the 1988 Summer Olympics.
