= Zvezdan Mitrović =

Montenegrin basketball coach

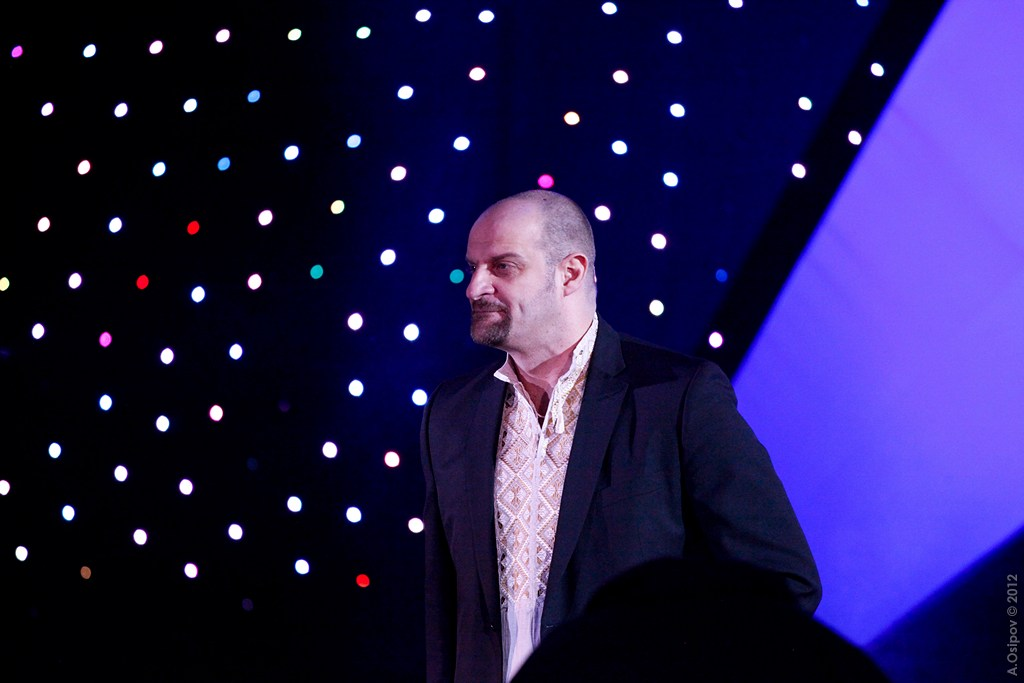

Cedevita Olimpija
- Position: Head coach
- League: 1. SKL; ABA League; EuroCup

Personal information
- Born: 19 February 1970 (age 56) Titograd, SR Montenegro, SFR Yugoslavia
- Coaching career: 1992–present

Career history

Coaching
- 1992–1995: Pikadili
- 1995–2000: Budućnost (assistant)
- 2000–2001: Mogren
- 2001–2002: Budućnost
- 2002–2007: Khimik
- 2007–2011: Krivbas
- 2011–2012: Budivelnyk
- 2012–2013: Khimik
- 2013: Montenegro (assistant)
- 2014: Azovmash
- 2015–2018: AS Monaco
- 2017–2019: Montenegro
- 2018–2020: ASVEL Villeurbanne
- 2020–2021: AS Monaco
- 2023–2024: Galatasaray Nef
- 2024–present: Cedevita Olimpija
- 2025–present: Montenegro

Career highlights
- As head coach: EuroCup Coach of The Year (2021); EuroCup champion (2021); French Pro A League champion (2019); 3× French League Cup winner (2016, 2017, 2018); 3× French League Best Coach (2017, 2018, 2021); French 2nd Division champion (2015); Ukrainian League champion (2009); Ukrainian Cup winner (2012); Ukrainian League Coach of the Year (2009); 2× Slovenian League champion (2025, 2026); 2× Slovenian Cup champion (2025, 2026); 2× Slovenian Supercup winner (2024, 2025); ABA League Coach of the Season (2026); As assistant coach: YUBA League champion (1999)

Zvezdan Mitrović (Serbian Cyrillic: Звездан Митровић; born 19 February 1970) is a Montenegrin professional basketball coach for Cedevita Olimpija.

== Coaching career ==
=== Ukrainian League (2002–2014) ===
During twelve years in the Ukrainian Basketball SuperLeague, Mitrović coached Khimik, Krivbasbasket, Budivelnyk Kyiv and Azovmash Mariupol.

=== Monaco (2015–2018) ===
As a new head coach, Mitrović joined AS Monaco in March 2015. He won the LNB Pro B league championship (French 2nd-tier league) in the 2014–15 season. AS Monaco was promoted to the LNB Pro A (French 1st-tier league) for the 2015–16 season. At the end of the season, he finished 2nd in the Best Coach of the Year voting.

In the 2015–16 season, his team finished first place in the regular season, and lost against ASVEL in the league's playoff semifinals. Mitrović was selected as the head coach of the International Team of the 2016 French All-Star Game. In the 2017–18 season, Mitrović led Monaco to the championship game of the Basketball Champions League, where the club lost to AEK Athens. On 16 May 2018, he was named the French Pro A League's Best Coach, for the second consecutive season.

=== ASVEL (2018–2020) ===
On 26 June 2018 Mitrović signed a three-year contract with ASVEL Basket. In the 2018–19 season, he guided the team to the French national championship title and to winning the French Cup. He was fired by ASVEL in May 2020 and contested the decision of the club.

=== Monaco (2020–2021) ===
On 2 July 2020 he returned to AS Monaco. He parted ways with the club on 13 December 2021.

=== Galatasaray (2023–2024) ===
On 11 May 2023, he became the head coach of Galatasaray Nef of the Turkish BSL.

On 30 January 2024, Galatasaray Ekmas lost 96–93 to the French representative JDA Dijon, which it hosted in the second match of Group J of the Champions League Round of 16. After the match, there was an argument between the yellow-red fans who wanted the resignation of Head Coach Mitrović and Mitrovic. Meanwhile, a controversy broke out when Mitrovic responded to the fans who reacted to him. Galatasaray staff took the experienced head coach to the dressing room.

On 31 January 2024, Galatasaray Ekmas announced that he had parted ways with head coach Mitrović, who had an argument with the fans in the JDA Dijon match.

=== Cedevita Olimpija (2024–present) ===
On 3 June 2024, he became the head coach of Cedevita Olimpija where he signed a two-year contract.

== National team coaching career ==
Mitrović was an assistant coach for the senior Montenegro men's national team at the EuroBasket 2013, under head coach Luka Pavićević.

On 6 October 2017 Mitrović was named the head coach of Montenegro senior men's national team until 2019.

== Coaching record ==
Legend
G	Games coached	W	Games won	L	Games lost	W–L %	Win-loss %

Note: The EuroLeague is not the only competition in which the team played during the season. He also coached in domestic competition, and regional competition if applicable.

=== EuroCup ===
Team	Year	G	W	L	W–L%	Result
AS Monaco	2020–21	22	16	6	.727	Won EuroCup Championship

=== EuroLeague ===
Team	Year	G	W	L	W–L%	Result
LDLC ASVEL Villeurbanne	2019–20	25	10	15	.400	Season cancelled due to the COVID-19 pandemic
AS Monaco	2020–21	14	5	9	.357	Left his position in December 2021
Career		39	15	24	.385	

== Career achievements and awards ==
As a head coach

- French Pro A Leaders Cup winner: 3 (with AS Monaco: 2016, 2017, 2018)
- French Second League champion: 1 (with AS Monaco: 2014–15)
- Ukrainian League champion: 1 (with Krivbasbasket: 2008–09)
- Ukrainian Cup winner: 1 (with Budivelnyk Kyiv: 2011–12)
- Basketball Champions League third place: 1 (with AS Monaco: 2017)
- FIBA EuroCup Challenge runner-up: 1 (with Khimik Yuzhne: 2005–06)

As an assistant coach

- Yugoslav Cup winner: 2 (with Budućnost: 1995–96, 1997–98)

Individual

- French League Coach of the Year: 2017 2018
- Ukrainian League Coach of the Year: 2009

== See also ==
- List of EuroCup-winning head coaches
