= Ricardo Greer =

Dominican-American professional basketball player and coach

Dayton Flyers
- Title: Associate head coach
- League: Atlantic 10 Conference

Personal information
- Born: August 18, 1977 (age 49) New York City, New York, U.S.
- Listed height: 6 ft 5 in (1.96 m)
- Listed weight: 200 lb (91 kg)

Career information
- High school: George Washington (New York City, New York); Cheshire Academy (Cheshire, Connecticut)
- College: Pittsburgh (1997–2001)
- NBA draft: 2001: undrafted
- Playing career: 2001–2015
- Position: Small forward
- Coaching career: 2017–present

Career history

Playing
- 2001: Los Prados
- 2001–2002: BC Kyiv
- 2002: Diablos de La Vega
- 2002–2003: STB Le Havre
- 2003–2004: London Towers
- 2004: BCM Gravelines
- 2004–2006: Strasbourg IG
- 2006–2007: EB Pau-Orthez
- 2007–2010: SLUC Nancy
- 2010: Zadar
- 2010–2014: Strasbourg IG
- 2014–2015: STB Le Havre
- 2015: Indios de San Francisco de Macorís

Coaching
- 2017–2021: Dayton (assistant)
- 2021–present: Dayton (associate HC)

Career highlights
- 2× French League champion (2005, 2008); French Cup winner (2007); French League Foreign Player's MVP (2010); French League Finals MVP (2005); 5× French League All-Star (2002, 2005–2007, 2009); British League All-Star (2004); Big East Conference Men's Basketball Most Improved Player (2000); 2x Second-team All-Big East (2000, 2001)

Ricardo Greer (born August 18, 1977) is a Dominican-American former professional basketball player who is currently an assistant coach at the University of Pittsburgh.

== National team career ==
Greer was part of the Dominican Republic national team from 1999 to 2009 helping the team at the 1999 and 2009 FIBA Americas Championships as well as the 2002 Caribebasket tournament.

== Awards and honors ==
- 2× French Pro A Champion: 2005, 2008
- French National Cup Winner: (2007)
- French Pro A Foreign MVP (2010)
- French Pro A Final MVP (2005)
- 3× French Pro A "Foreign" First Team: 2005, 2008, 2010
- BBL First Team: 2004
- 5× LNB All-star: 2002, 2005, 2006, 2007, 2009

== Personal life ==
Ricardo has a son named RJ and a daughter named Maddison. Ricardo has a younger brother, Jeff Greer, who also played in French Pro A League and for the Dominican Republic national team.
