= Lamayn Wilson =

American professional basketball player (born 1980)

Free agent
- Position: Small forward / power forward

Personal information
- Born: June 11, 1980 (age 46) Crenshaw County, Alabama
- Listed height: 6 ft 8 in (2.03 m)
- Listed weight: 220 lb (100 kg)

Career information
- High school: Highland Home (Highland Home, Alabama)
- College: Pearl River CC (1998–2000); Troy (2000–2002)
- NBA draft: 2002: undrafted
- Playing career: 2002–present

Career history
- 2002–2003: Skonto
- 2003–2004: Avtodor Saratov
- 2004–2005: Ludwigsburg
- 2005–2006: Cholet
- 2006–2007: Cantù
- 2007–2008: ASVEL
- 2008–2009: SLUC Nancy
- 2009–2010: Türk Telekom
- 2010–2011: Budivelnyk
- 2011–2012: ČEZ Nymburk
- 2012: Armia
- 2013: Capitanes de Arecibo
- 2013: Krasnye Krylia
- 2013–2014: Cholet
- 2014–2015: Ironi Nes Ziona
- 2015–2016: Kataja
- 2016–2017: ADA Blois 41

Career highlights
- EuroChallenge champion (2013); Russian Cup winner (2013); Czech League champion (2012); Ukrainian League champion (2011); French Cup winner (2008)

Layman Wilson

Lamayn E Wilson (born June 11, 1980) is an American professional basketball player who last played for ADA Blois Basket 41 of the LNB Pro B.

== Playing career ==
After finishing collegiate career at the Troy State, Lamayn started his pro career in Latvia with BK Skonto. It turned into efficient career as he later also played for teams in Russia, Germany, France, Italy, Ukraine, China, Turkey, Philippines, Puerto Rico, Georgia.

During the 2007–08 season, he Wilson played for ASVEL Basket, where he averaged 17.1 points and 5.8 rebounds in ULEB Cup, helping the team to reach the elimination rounds. With ASVEL he also won French Cup. In the following season Wilson played in Euroleague for SLUC Nancy Basket.

In 2010–11 season, he played key role in BC Budivelnyk success, which resulted in making quarterfinals of Eurocup and winning Ukrainian championship. For the 2011–12 season Lamayn signed with Czech Republic's ČEZ Basketball Nymburk, helping them to reach Eurocup playoffs and win domestic league title.

On August 24, 2014, he signed with Ironi Nes Ziona B.C. from Israel.

== EuroLeague career statistics ==
Legend
GP	Games played	GS	Games started	MPG	Minutes per game
FG%	Field-goal percentage	3P%	3-point field-goal percentage	FT%	Free-throw percentage
RPG	Rebounds per game	APG	Assists per game	SPG	Steals per game
BPG	Blocks per game	PPG	Points per game	PIR	Performance index rating
**Bold**	Career high

Year	Team	GP	GS	MPG	FG%	3P%	FT%	RPG	APG	SPG	BPG	PPG	PIR
2008–09	SLUC Nancy	9	9	30.1	.448	.317	.556	4.1	.8	1.4	.3	12.1	9.3
Career		9	9	30.1	.448	.317	.556	4.1	.8	1.4	.3	12.1	9.3
