= Laurent Bernard =

French basketball player (born 1971)

Laurent Bernard (born June 15, 1971, in Chatenay-Malabry) is a French basketball player who played 9 times for the French men's national basketball team between 2000 and 2001.
