= Cyril Julian =

French basketball player

Medal record

Representing France

Men's basketball

Olympic Games
Silver medal – second place	2000 Sydney	

European U-18 Championship
Gold medal – first place	1992 Hungary	U-18 Team

Cyril Julian (born 29 March 1974 in Castres, Tarn) is a French former men's professional basketball player. He spent most of his club career with the pro club SLUC Nancy in France. Julian was a 3 time French League French Player's MVP (2002, 2006, 2007). Julian also played with the senior men's French national basketball team. He won a silver medal at the 2000 Summer Olympics, while playing with France's national team. He was inducted into the French Basketball Hall of Fame in 2021.

== Club career ==
After a stint in Tarbes where he started at 15 in Nationale 3, he joined the elite of French basketball by signing at SLUC Nancy. He played there for four seasons before joining the PSG Racing club where he played for two seasons before returning to his former club Nancy. During this period, he played alongside Laurent Sciarra and then during the second season of Tony Parker who made his debut in the professional world.

The 2001-2002 season brought its first successes to the Nancy club. The club won the last edition of the Korać Cup against Russian club Mineralnye Vody. At the end of that same season, Julian was awarded the title of MVP as an individual.

He then signed for the Pau-Orthez club [2]. This season is the last for the Boris Diaw generation, Mickaël and Florent Piétrus under the colors of Élan. The club achieved the grand slam on the national level, winning the Semaine des As, the Coupe de France and the French Championship. On the European level, the club narrowly misses its qualification for the Top 16 of the Euroleague.

The following season was again marked by a title of champion of France, the first for Didier Gadou who replaced Alain Sarre during the season, despite qualifying for the Top 16 in the Euroleague.

After his two seasons in Pau, he tries an experience abroad. He joined the Liga ACB at Pamesa Valence then Casademont Girona.

For the following season, he finds the club of Nancy, which has just played the final of the championship of France [3].

The club, which has retained most of its executives, has the ambition to win the title. His club reached the final again and was opposed to the Le Mans club. The latter, thanks in particular to a final contribution of 12 points in the last quarter time [4] won a long-contested meeting. The title of French MVP is not enough to mitigate the disappointment of Julian, who has achieved 18 double doubles this season.

The 2006-07 season resembles the previous one, with SLUC dropping the title in its third consecutive final, after having long dominated the future winner Roanne. Julian, after having achieved one of the best seasons of his career (14.8 points, 8.4 rebounds and 19.7 evaluation), obtains his third French MVP title.

The 2007-2008 season will allow Nancy and Cyril Julian to obtain the title of Champion of France against Roanne and access the Euroleague for the 2008-2009 season. During this competition, SLUC won only two matches, for eight losses, in its group of the first round. Julian, whose best performance is 21 points and 7 rebounds against Montepaschi Siena, ends this competition with statistics of 13.8 points, 7.3 rebounds in 24:03 [5]. He retired at the end of the 2008-2009 season, at the end of the lost series of semi-finals against Villeurbanne.

== National team career ==
After having evolved with the French team of hopes, he made his debut for the French team in 1996, against Lithuania [6]. He quickly became one of the pillars of the national team, participating in the 1997 European Championships and then in the 1999 European Championships which took place in France. The fourth place obtained during this last tournament gives France a participation in the Olympic Games of 2000. France disappoints in the first round, but, thanks to a favorable combination of circumstances, victory for Canada over Yugoslavia in the other group, its course in the final phase is easier. After eliminating Canada in the quarter, then Australia in the semi, France finds itself opposed to the United States in the final. The French offer good resistance to the American stars of the NBA but ultimately lose by ten points.

The following year, France finished in sixth place. In 2003, she was among the favorites. It aligns indeed NBA players, Jérôme Moïso, Tariq Abdul-Wahad and Tony Parker. After a start to the competition that met expectations, France failed against Lithuania in the semi-final, before dropping the match for fourth place against Italy. This last defeat puts an end to the hopes of a new participation in the games.

During the 2005 European Championships, which takes place in Serbia, the French team meets Antoine Rigaudeau. France put an end to the hopes of the home side in the play-off, then eliminated defending champion Lithuania in the quarter-finals before facing Greece. France which leads by 7 points at 47 seconds from the end, suffered a comeback from the Greeks before finally losing on the score of 66 to 67. France however manages to re-motivate itself to win the medal of bronze against Spain.

The 2005 European campaign granted France the right to participate in the 2006 World Championships. Julian's ambition is to end his international career there. But, the trainer Claude Bergeaud finally prefers a youngster, Johan Petro, in order to give him the possibility of acquiring an experience of international competitions [7].

Julian then announces the end of his career with the French team. However, in 2008, he no longer excludes a return to the French team, while declaring that this could not be done in the context of qualifying for the European Championship 2009. He wishes to take advantage of the summer break to have the foot operated.

== Post-playing career ==
In June 2009, he retired from professional sports. He works as a speaker for companies on performance, stress management, high level.

In September 2014, with two partners, he opened a first center under the En Formes brand, specializing in the care and sports rehabilitation of obese people.

The concept of this center is based on a physical and sports rehabilitation program for people with obesity, whether or not they require bariatric surgery. This program is aimed at children and adolescents as well as adults.

Currently, very few sports centers or clubs are suitable for welcoming and caring for obese people, resulting in a low physical practice for this population (stigmatization, low motivation or rapid failure due to lack of suitable programs and facilities. .). However, this physical and sporting activity is essential in the surgical management of obese patients, because it optimizes and ensures the sustainability of weight loss while limiting muscle wasting and bone and joint disorders. This need is now well known, as the scientific literature insists on the need to supervise weight loss with physical activity of at least 150 minutes per week, data taken up by the Haute Autorité de Santé.

Designed by healthcare professionals and a former high-level athlete, this program offers care over twenty weeks at the rate of one session in the center and two sessions at home per week, following an adapted and specific program.

Specialized in adapted sport, he designed his working method recognized in the medical world.

He works for the hospitals of the SOS santé group as well as for the dialysis patients of the ASA.

Cyril Julian is now a triathlete, he runs ironmans 70.3 and 140.6 and is destined to finish the trilogy of extreme triathlons which are the Norseman, Celtman and Swissman.
