= William Howard (basketball) =

French basketball player (born 1993)

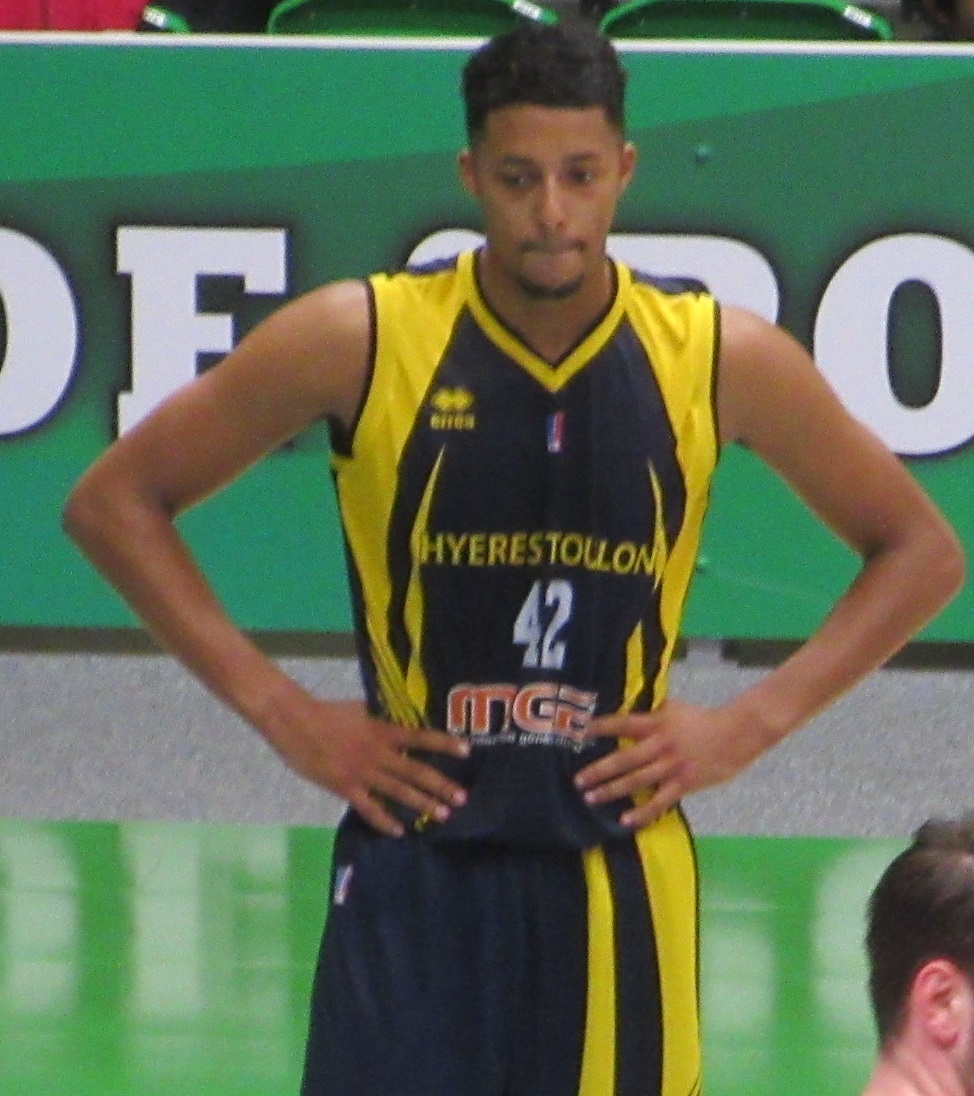
- Howard in 2017

No. 25 – Covirán Granada
- Position: Small forward / power forward
- League: Liga ACB

Personal information
- Born: October 25, 1993 (age 33) Montbrison, France
- Listed height: 6 ft 8 in (2.03 m)
- Listed weight: 207 lb (94 kg)

Career information
- High school: New Hope Academy (Forestville, Maryland)
- NBA draft: 2015: undrafted
- Playing career: 2012–present

Career history
- 2012–2014: Gravelines-Dunkerque
- 2014–2015: Denain Voltaire
- 2015–2017: Hyères-Toulon
- 2017–2019: Limoges
- 2019: Salt Lake City Stars
- 2019–2020: Houston Rockets
- 2019–2020: →Rio Grande Valley Vipers
- 2020–2022: ASVEL
- 2022: Joventut
- 2024: Le Mans
- 2024: Bàsquet Girona
- 2025: Nanterre 92
- 2025–present: Covirán Granada

Career highlights
- 2x Pro A champion (2021, 2022); French Cup winner (2021)
- Stats at NBA.com
- Stats at Basketball Reference

William Howard (born October 25, 1993) is a French professional basketball player for Covirán Granada of the Liga ACB. Howard started his basketball career in his home country, France.

== Professional career ==
=== Gravelines-Dunkerque (2012–2014) ===
In June 2012, while preparing to enter the University of Washington, he returned to France because he was ineligible for the NCAA because of a low score on an English exam. A month later, he signed with BCM Gravelines-Dunkerque.

On June 25, 2014, he was extended for two years by Gravelines-Dunkerque.

=== Loan to Denain Voltaire (2014–2015) ===
On July 12, 2014, he was sent on loan to Denain Voltaire Basket in Pro B.

=== Hyères-Toulon (2015–2017) ===
Between June 20 and June 25, 2015, he participated in an internship in Vichy with the France A team.

On June 25, 2015, he joined Hyères-Toulon.

=== Limoges CSP (2017–2019) ===
On May 27, 2017, Howard joined Limoges CSP. On June 15, 2018, the Limoges re-signed with Howard for another year.

=== Salt Lake City Stars (2019) ===
On July 15, 2019, he received an offer to join the Utah Jazz, who helped buy out his contract with Limoges. Howard officially signed with the Jazz on July 17. He was ultimately waived and added to their NBA G League affiliate, the Salt Lake City Stars.

=== Houston Rockets (2019–2020) ===
On December 27, 2019, the Houston Rockets announced via Twitter that they had signed Howard to a two-way contract.

=== ASVEL (2020–2022) ===
On July 16, 2020, ASVEL announced that they had signed with Howard.

=== Joventut Badalona (2022) ===
On July 21, 2022, he has signed with Joventut Badalona of the Spanish Liga ACB.

=== Bàsquet Girona (2024) ===
On October 30, 2024, he has signed with Bàsquet Girona of the Spanish Liga ACB.

=== Nantarre 92 (2025) ===
On January 3, 2025, he signed with Nanterre 92 of the LNB Pro A.

=== Covirán Granada (2025–present) ===
On December 4, 2025, he signed with Covirán Granada of the Liga ACB.

== Career statistics ==
Legend
GP	Games played	GS	Games started	MPG	Minutes per game
FG%	Field-goal percentage	3P%	3-point field-goal percentage	FT%	Free-throw percentage
RPG	Rebounds per game	APG	Assists per game	SPG	Steals per game
BPG	Blocks per game	PPG	Points per game	PIR	Performance index rating
**Bold**	Career high

=== NBA ===
Year	Team	GP	GS	MPG	FG%	3P%	FT%	RPG	APG	SPG	BPG	PPG
2019–20	Houston	2	0	6.5	.000	.000	—	1.0	.5	.0	.0	.0
Career		2	0	6.5	.000	.000	—	1.0	.5	.0	.0	.0

=== EuroLeague ===
Year	Team	GP	GS	MPG	FG%	3P%	FT%	RPG	APG	SPG	BPG	PPG	PIR
2020–21	ASVEL	**22**	2	17.8	**.544**	**.515**	**.935**	3.0	**1.2**	**1.1**	.1	**8.5**	**10.3**
2021–22	ASVEL	21	**11**	**22.6**	.450	.432	.826	**3.5**	.7	1.0	**.2**	6.1	7.3
Career		43	13	20.2	.500	.482	.889	3.2	1.0	1.0	.2	7.3	8.8
