= Laurent Foirest =

French basketball player

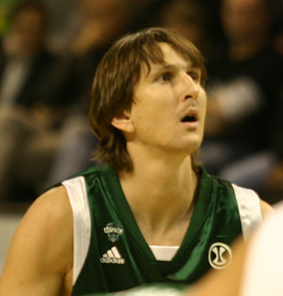

Metropolitans 92
- Title: Head coach
- League: LNB Pro A

Personal information
- Born: 18 September 1973 (age 53) Marseille, France
- Listed height: 6 ft 6 in (1.98 m)
- Listed weight: 209 lb (95 kg)

Career information
- Playing career: 1989–2011
- Position: Small forward
- Coaching career: 2014–present

Career history

Playing
- 1989–1996: Olympique Antibes
- 1996–1999: Pau-Orthez
- 1999–2003: TAU Cerámica
- 2003–2006: Pau-Orthez
- 2006–2011: ASVEL Basket

Coaching
- 2014–2015: France (assistant)
- 2015–2023: Béliers de Kemper
- 2017–present: France (assistant)
- 2023–present: Metropolitans 92

Career highlights
- 6× French League champion (1991, 1995, 1998, 1999, 2004, 2009); French Cup winner (2008); 2× French League French Player's MVP (1999, 2004); French Basketball Hall of Fame (2018); Spanish League champion (2002); Spanish King's Cup winner (2002)
Medals
Representing France
Men's basketball
Olympic Games
Silver medal – second place	2000 Sydney	{{{2}}}
European U-18 Championship
Gold medal – first place	1992 Hungary	U-18 Team

Laurent Foirest (born 18 September 1973) is a French professional basketball coach and former player who played at the small forward position. He is at a height of 6 ft 6 in (1.98 m) tall. He is current head coach for Metropolitans 92 of the LNB Pro A. He was inducted into the French Basketball Hall of Fame in 2018.

== Professional career ==
Foirest played professionally with Saski Baskonia of the Spanish Liga ACB.

== National team career ==
Foirest won a silver medal with the senior French national basketball team at the 2000 Summer Olympic Games.
