= Hugues Occansey =

French basketball player

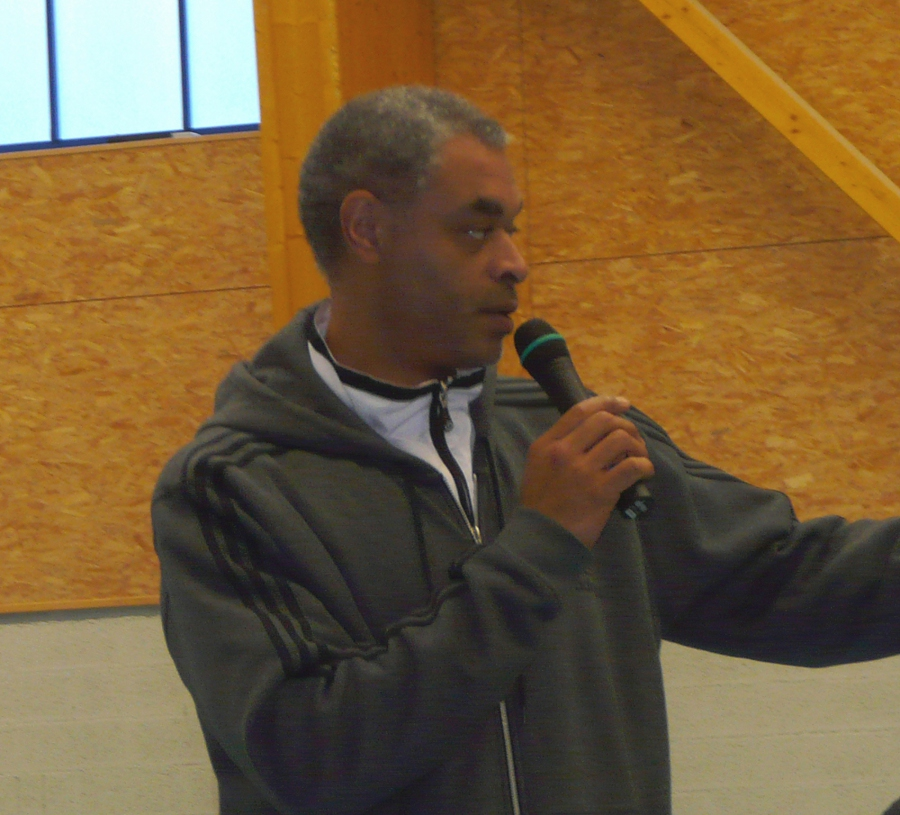
- Hugues Occansey in 2012

Personal information
- Born: 18 December 1966 (age 59) Moyeuvre-Grande, France
- Listed height: 6 ft 7 in (2.01 m)

Career information
- Playing career: 1982–2002
- Position: Small forward

Career history
- 1982–1988: Limoges (France)
- 1988–1993: Antibes (France)
- 1993–1994: Montpellier Basket (France)
- 1994–1995: ASVEL Villeurbane (France)
- 1995–1998: Limoges (France)
- 1998–2000: Peristeri (Greece)
- 2000–2001: Pamesa Valencia (Spain)
- 2001: ALM Évreux Basket (France)
- 2001–2002: Strasbourg IG (France)

Hugues Occansey (born 18 December 1966 in Moyeuvre-Grande, France) is a French basketball player who played 83 times for the men's French national basketball team between 1985 and 1995.
