= John Linehan (basketball) =

American basketball player (born 1978)

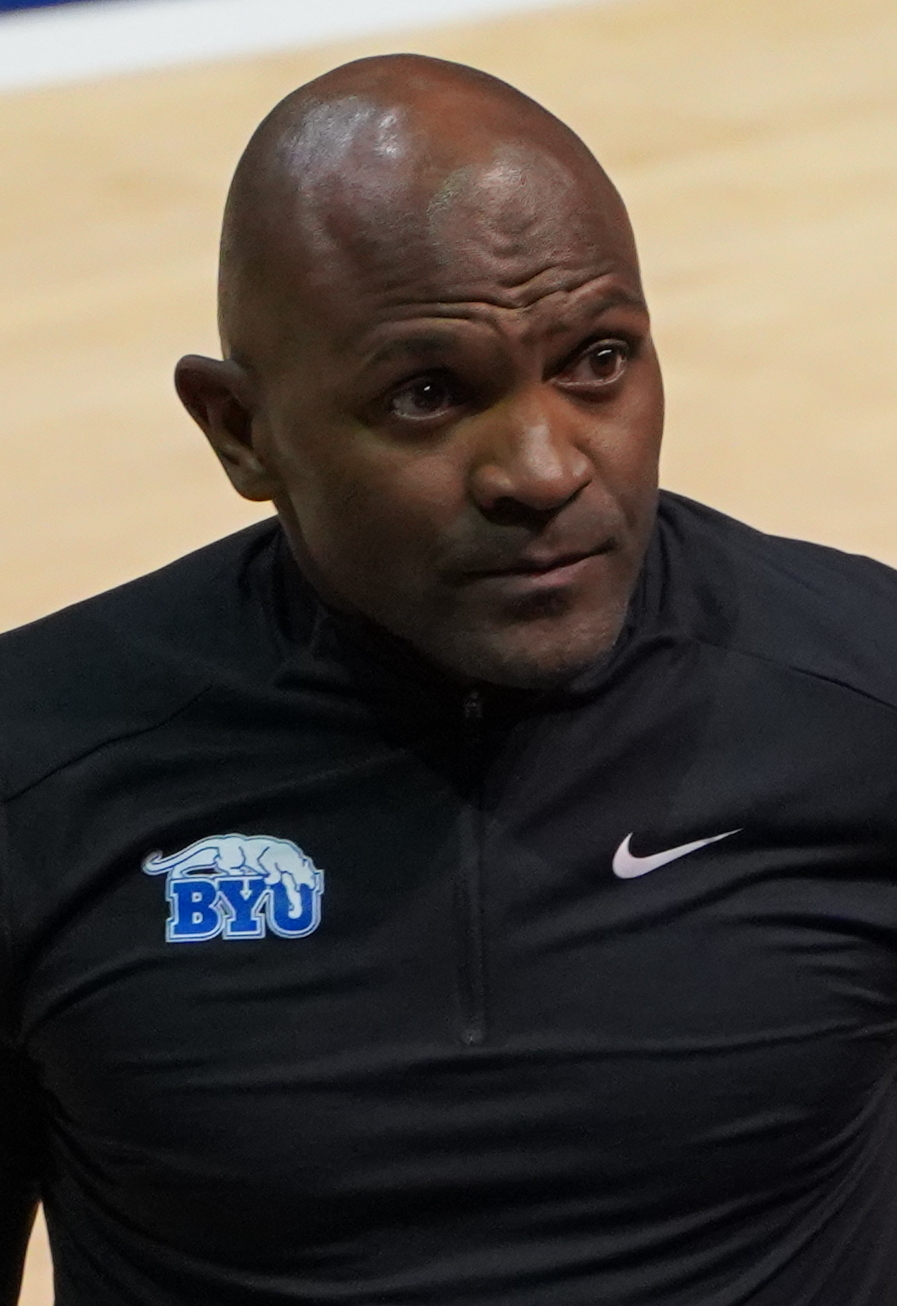
- Linehan with BYU in 2024

BYU Cougars
- Title: Assistant coach
- League: Big 12 Conference

Personal information
- Born: May 1, 1978 (age 48) Chester, Pennsylvania, U.S.
- Listed height: 5 ft 9 in (1.75 m)
- Listed weight: 165 lb (75 kg)

Career information
- High school: Chester (Chester, Pennsylvania); Winchendon (Winchendon, Massachusetts)
- College: Providence (1997–2002)
- NBA draft: 2002: undrafted
- Playing career: 2002–2013
- Position: Point guard
- Coaching career: 2015–present

Career history

Playing
- 2002–2003: Greenville Groove
- 2003–2004: Dakota Wizards
- 2004–2006: Paris Racing
- 2006: SIG Strasbourg
- 2006–2007: SLUC Nancy
- 2008–2009: BC Kalev
- 2009–2010: Cholet
- 2010–2013: SLUC Nancy

Coaching
- 2015–2016: Drexel (operations asst.)
- 2016–2017: Brown (assistant)
- 2017–2019: Hartford (assistant)
- 2019–2022: Georgia (assistant)
- 2022–2024: Saint Joseph's (assistant)
- 2024–present: BYU (assistant)

Career highlights
- 3× French League Best Defender (2006, 2010, 2011); ALL-KML Defensive Player of the Year (2009); French League Finals MVP (2011); NABC Defensive Player of the Year (2002); 2× Big East Defensive Player of the Year (2001, 2002); 2× Second-team All-Big East (2001, 2002)

John Lewis Linehan (born May 1, 1978) is an American professional basketball coach and former player who is an assistant coach for the Brigham Young University (BYU) men's basketball team. Linehan has held various coaching roles at the professional, minor league, and collegiate levels in the United States and in other countries. As a player, Linehan played point guard and spent a decade playing professionally in the U.S. and internationally.

== High school ==
Born in Chester, Pennsylvania, Linehan played competitive high school basketball, first at Chester High School, and then at Winchendon School, in Winchendon, Massachusetts.

== College career ==
Linehan played college basketball for Providence College's Friars, from 1997 to 2002. He led the Big East Conference in steals, in three different seasons, and also earned the Big East Defensive Player of the Year and second-team All-Big East honors his last two seasons. As a senior, in the 2001–02 season, he averaged 12.5 points, 3.8 rebounds, 4.4 assists, and 4.5 steals per game, finishing second in the nation in steals.

As a result, he was awarded the Henry Iba Corinthian Award, as the National Association of Basketball Coaches' Defensive Player of the Year, for that season. He finished his collegiate career as the NCAA Division I's all-time career leader in steals, with 385. On December 5, 2021, Richmond's Jacob Gilyard broke Linehan's nearly 20-year old record after recording his 386th steal in a win over Northern Iowa.

== Professional playing career ==
Linehan was not drafted into the National Basketball Association (NBA). He played for the Greenville Groove, of the National Basketball Development League (NBDL). In the 2003–04 season, he played for the Dakota Wizards of the Continental Basketball Association (CBA), and won the league's championship with the team.

After winning the CBA championship, Linehan moved to Europe, and signed with Paris Basket Racing of the LNB Pro A in France, where he also played two years (2006–08) for SLUC Nancy. In the 2008–09 season, he played for Kalev/Cramo, in Estonia. With the team, he won the Estonian Cup and the Estonian League championship. Around this time, Linehan was nicknamed "Le Virus" (English: "The Virus").

In July 2009, he signed a one-year contract with the French Pro A team Cholet Basket. He won the 2009–10 season's French League championship with the team.

In July 2010, Linehan signed a contract with the French club SLUC Nancy, and in the 2010–11 season, he won the French League championship with them. Linehan at one time held the record for the most assists in a single EuroLeague game, with 15 assists. On the 3 November 2011, he delivered 15 assists, in a EuroLeague game against Fenerbahçe. The record was later broken.

== Coaching career ==
Linehan began his career as a basketball coach in 2015, and has coached at Drexel, Brown, Hartford, Georgia, and Saint Joseph's. On June 5, 2024, Linehan was announced as an assistant coach for BYU.

== See also ==
- List of NCAA Division I men's basketball players with 11 or more steals in a game
- List of NCAA Division I men's basketball career steals leaders
