= Zénith d'Orléans =

Sporting arena and concert hall in Orléans, France

- Interactive map of Zénith d'Orléans
- Location: Orléans, Loiret; France
- Coordinates: 47.870446°N 1.913126°E
- Operator: S.A. Orléans Spectacles
- Capacity: Concerts: 6,900; Basketball: 5,338

Construction
- Opened: September 26, 1996
- Architects: Chaix & Morel et associés

Zénith d'Orléans (French pronunciation: [zenit dɔʁleɑ̃]) is an indoor sporting arena and concert hall that is located in the city of Orléans, France. The arena, one of a series of similar venues throughout France, has a seating capacity of 5,338 for basketball games and 6,900 for concerts.

== History ==
While the arena has mainly been used for concerts, it has also served as the home arena of the French Pro A League professional basketball team Entente Orléanaise, for European cup matches like EuroLeague and EuroCup games.

== See also ==
- List of indoor arenas in France
