= Alain Koffi =

French basketball player (born 1983)

Personal information
- Born: 23 November 1983 (age 42) Abidjan, Ivory Coast
- Listed height: 6 ft 9.5 in (2.07 m)
- Listed weight: 240 lb (109 kg)

Career information
- NBA draft: 2005: undrafted
- Playing career: 2002–2021
- Position: Power forward / center

Career history
- 2002–2009: Le Mans Sarthe
- 2009–2010: Joventut Badalona
- 2010–2014: Le Mans Sarthe
- 2014–2016: Rouen Métropole Basket
- 2016–2018: Élan Béarnais Pau-Orthez
- 2018–2020: BCM Gravelines-Dunkerque
- 2020–2021: Le Mans Sarthe

Career highlights
- French League French Player's MVP (2009)

Alain Koffi (born 23 November 1983) is a French former professional basketball player.

== Professional career ==
Koffi was the French League French Player's MVP, in 2009.

Koffi spent the 2019-20 season with BCM Gravelines-Dunkerque and averaged 8 points and 5 rebounds per game. He initially signed a two-month contract with Le Mans Sarthe, however, on 8 October 2020 he extended his contract until the end of the season.

== French national team ==
Koffi was a member of the senior French national basketball team.

== Honors ==
Le Mans

- French Cup Winner: 2
  - 2004 2009
- French League Champion: 1
  - 2006
