= STB Le Havre =

- Nickname: STB
- Leagues: Élite 2
- Founded: 1924
- History: 1924–present
- Arena: Dock Océane
- Capacity: 3,598
- Location: Le Havre, France
- Team colors: Red, White
- President: Thierry Picard
- Head coach: Eric Bartecheky
- Website: stblehavre.com
| Home | Away |

Saint Thomas Basket Le Havre or simply STB Le Havre is a French professional basketball club based in the city of Le Havre, that plays its home games in their arena Dock Océane. The team currently competes in the second division Élite 2, having won promotion from the Ligue nationale de basket in the most recent, 2025–26 season.

== History ==
The Saint Thomas d'Aquin sports club was founded in 1903 and its basketball division opened in 1924 by brothers Louis and Roger Pineau. STB Le Havre was the first team to register with the French Basketball Federation when it was established 1932.

In 1952, under coach Edouard Barq, Le Havre qualified for the top league and finished its debut season with a winning record (9-8). In 1955, Claude Josephau carried Le Havre all the way to the French Cup semifinals where the club lost to Paris University Club, 55–50, in front of a crowd of 1,200.

In the late 1980s, Le Havre battled its way back up the ladder and in 1993 secured a spot in the LNB Pro B division of the Ligue Nationale de Basket (LNB). In 1995, the club made the semifinals of the French Cup. The team joined the French Pro A League in 2000. Despite hiring former France national team coach Michel Gomez for the first season in Pro A, the team struggled mightily and fired Gomez to avoid relegation. The team hired Eric Girard and brought in future stars Jermaine Guice and Ricardo Greer, who helped lead the club to the Semaine des As finals in 2003.

STB took 6th place in Group A of the 2003-2004 FIBA Europe League with a record of 4 wins and 8 losses. STB then made the semifinals of the 2004 French Cup. At the 2004-2005 Eurocup, the team took 3rd place in Group B with a record of 6 wins and 4 losses. At the 2008-2009 Europcup, STB lost all 6 of their games to finish 4th place in Group C.

== Season by season ==
| Season | Tier | Division | Pos. | French Cup | European competitions | |
|---|---|---|---|---|---|---|
| 2009–10 | 1 | Pro A | 13th | | | |
| 2010–11 | 1 | Pro A | 13th | | | |
| 2011–12 | 1 | Pro A | 14th | | | |
| 2012–13 | 1 | Pro A | 11th | | | |
| 2013–14 | 1 | Pro A | 14th | | | |
| 2014–15 | 1 | Pro A | 6th | | | |
| 2015–16 | 1 | Pro A | 18th | | 3 FIBA Europe Cup | R32 |
| 2016–17 | 2 | Pro B | 7th | | | |

== Notable players ==
Note: Flags indicate national team eligibility at FIBA-sanctioned events. Players may hold other non-FIBA nationalities not displayed.

Criteria

To appear in this section a player must have either:

- Set a club record or won an individual award while at the club
- Played at least one official international match for their national team at any time
- Played at least one official NBA match at any time.

- (Saint Vincent and the Grenadines) Shawn King
- (Canada) Eric Hinrichsen (2002-2003)
- Allen Mack, Jr.
