= LNB Pro A Best Defender =

Basketball award given in the top tier French division

The LNB Pro A Best Defender Award is an annual professional basketball award that is given by the top tier division in France, the LNB Pro A. It is awarded to the most valuable defensive player in each Pro A regular season.

== Winners ==
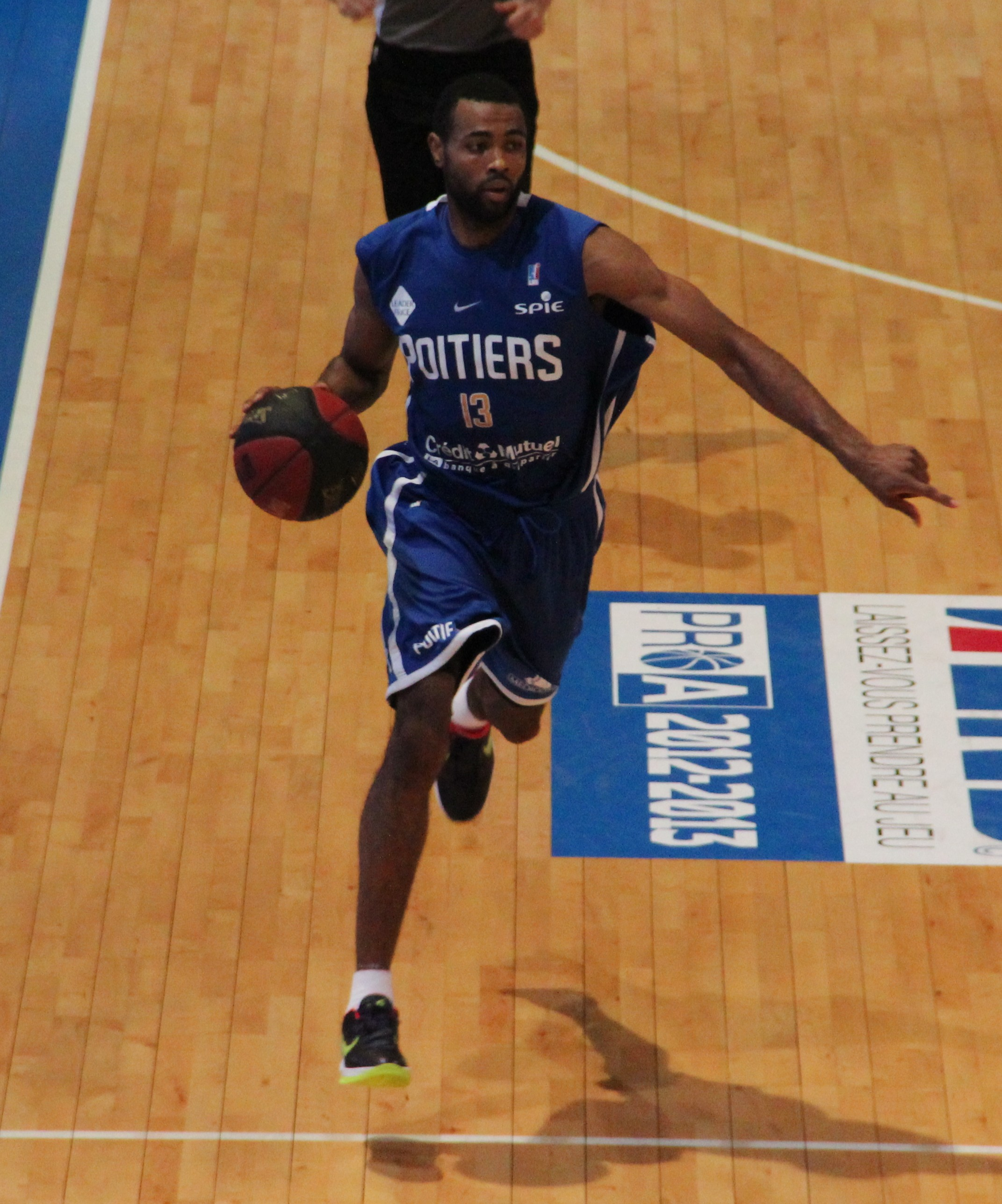
Guard Anthony Dobbins won the award three times – in 2009, 2013 and 2014

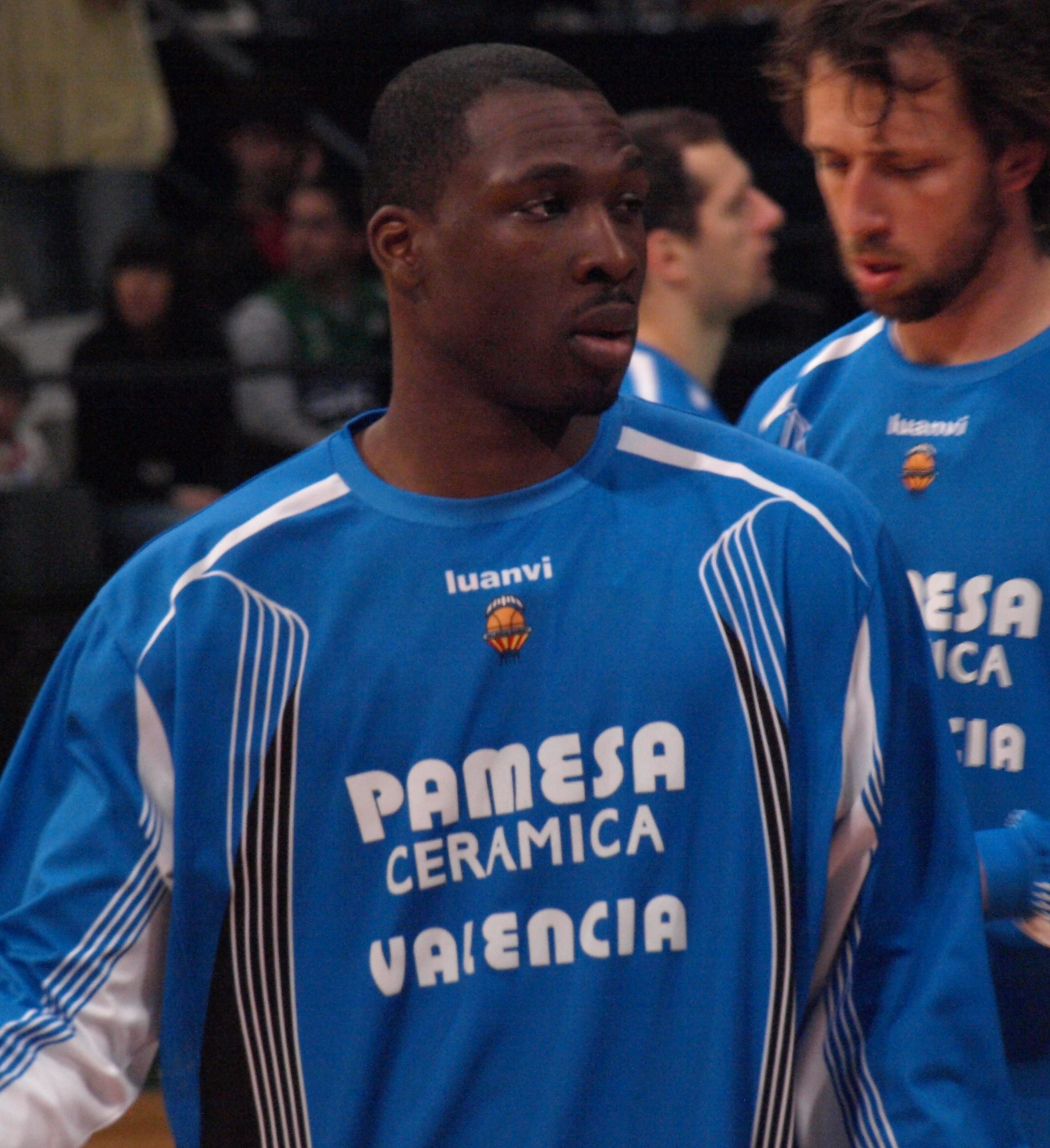
Florent Piétrus won the award twice, in 2002 and 2015

^	Denotes player who is still active in the Pro A
*	Inducted into the FIBA Hall of Fame or the French Basketball Academy
Player (X)	Denotes the number of times the player has received the award

Season	Player	Position	Nationality	Team
1985–86	Allen Bunting	Forward	United States	Olympique Antibes
1986–87	Richard Dacoury*	Guard/forward	France	Limoges CSP
1987–88	Richard Dacoury* (2)	Guard/forward	France	Limoges CSP
1988–89	Richard Dacoury* (3)	Guard/forward	France	Limoges CSP
1989–90	Richard Dacoury* (4)	Guard/forward	France	Limoges CSP
1990–91	Richard Dacoury* (5)	Guard/forward	France	Limoges CSP
1991–92	Richard Dacoury* (6)	Guard/forward	France	Limoges CSP
1992–93	Richard Dacoury* (7)	Guard/forward	France	Limoges CSP
1993–94	Richard Dacoury* (8)	Guard/forward	France	Limoges CSP
1994–95	Richard Dacoury* (9)	Guard/forward	France	Limoges CSP
1995–96	Arsène Ade-Mensah	Guard	France	Olympique Antibes
1996–97	Jim Bilba	Center	France	ASVEL
1997–98	Arsène Ade-Mensah (2)	Guard	France	Paris Basket Racing
1998–99	Jim Bilba (2)	Center	France	ASVEL
1999–2000	Jim Bilba (3)	Center	France	ASVEL
2000–01	Jim Bilba (4)	Center	France	ASVEL
2001–02	Florent Piétrus	Forward	France	Pau-Orthez
2002–03	Makan Dioumassi	Guard	France	Hyères-Toulon
2003–04	Thierry Rupert	Forward	France	SIG Strasbourg
2004–05	Michael Mokongo	Guard	Central Africa (Note: Mokongo, born in Bimbo, Central African Republic, also owns the French nationality.)	Élan Chalon
2005–06	John Linehan	Forward	United States	Racing Paris/SIG Strasbourg
2006–07	Marc-Antoine Pellin	Guard	France	Chorale Roanne
2007–08	Dounia Issa	Forward	France	JA Vichy
2008–09	Tony Dobbins	Guard	Italy	Orléans Loiret
2009–10	John Linehan (2)	Guard	United States	Cholet
2010–11	John Linehan (3)	Guard	United States	SLUC Nancy
2011–12	Andrew Albicy	Guard	France	BCM Gravelines
2012–13	Tony Dobbins (2)	Guard	Italy	Poitiers
2013–14	Tony Dobbins (3)	Guard	Italy	JDA Dijon
2014–15	Florent Piétrus (2)	Forward	France	SLUC Nancy
2015–16	Charles Lombahe-Kahudi^	Guard/forward	France (Note: Charles Lombahe-Kahudi, born in Kinshasa, also owns the Congolese nationality.)	ASVEL
2016–17	Moustapha Fall	Center	France	Élan Chalon
2017–18	Aaron Craft	Guard	United States	Monaco
2018–19	Lahaou Konaté^	Shooting guard	France	Nanterre 92
2019–20	Not awarded (Note: There was no awarding in the 2019–20, because the season was cancelled due to the coronavirus pandemic in Europe.)			
2020–21	Moustapha Fall (2)^	Center	France	ASVEL
2021–22	Ismaël Kamagate	Center	France	Paris Basketball
2022–23	Victor Wembanyama	Forward/center	France	Metropolitans 92
2023–24	John Brown	Forward	United States	AS Monaco Basket
2024–25	Alpha Diallo	Forward	Guinea (Note: Alpha Diallo, born in New York City, also owns American nationality.)	AS Monaco Basket
2025–26	Alpha Diallo	Forward	Guinea	AS Monaco Basket

== Awards by players ==
Rank	Player	Awards
1	Richard Dacoury	9
2	Jim Bilba	4
3	John Lineman	3
3	Tony Dobbins	3
5	Florent Piétrus	2
5	Moustapha Fall	2
5	Alpha Diallo	2
