= 2020–21 Pro A season =

Professional basketball season in France

2020–21 Pro A
- Season: 2020–21
- Dates: 26 September 2020 – 26 June 2021
- Teams: 18

Regular season
- Relegated: Élan Chalon; Boulazac Basket Dordogne

Finals
- Champions: LDLC ASVEL (20th title)
- Runners-up: JDA Dijon
- Semi-finalists: AS Monaco Basket; SIG Strasbourg

The 2020–21 Pro A season, for sponsorships reasons the Jeep Élite, was the 99th season of the Pro A, the top basketball league in France organised by the Ligue Nationale de Basket (LNB). It was the fourth season with Jeep as main sponsor. The season began on 26 September 2020 and ended on 26 June 2021.

LDLC ASVEL won its 20th league championship by defeating JDA Dijon in the final.

== Format ==
Different from previous seasons, the playoffs were played in a single-elimination format.

== Teams ==
Location of teams in the 2019–20 Pro A season

Because the 2019–20 season was curtailed due to the COVID-19 pandemic no teams were relegated and promoted.

=== Locations and arenas ===
Team	Home city	Stadium	Capacity
AS Monaco	Fontvieille, Monaco	Salle Gaston Médecin	3,700
ASVEL	Lyon–Villeurbanne	Astroballe	5,556
BCM Gravelines-Dunkerque	Gravelines	Sportica	3,500
Boulazac Dordogne	Boulazac	Le Palio	5,200
Champagne Châlons Reims	Reims	Complexe René-Tys	3,000
Cholet	Cholet	La Meilleraie	5,191
Élan Béarnais Pau-Lacq-Orthez	Pau	Palais des Sports de Pau	7,707
Élan Chalon	Chalon-sur-Saône	Le Colisée	5,000
ESSM Le Portel	Le Portel	Le Chaudron	3,500
JDA Dijon	Dijon	Palais des Sports de Dijon	5,000
JL Bourg	Bourg-en-Bresse	Ekinox	3,548
Le Mans Sarthe	Le Mans	Antarès	6,003
Limoges CSP	Limoges	Beaublanc	6,000
Metropolitans 92	Levallois	Palais des Sports Marcel Cerdan	4,000
Nanterre 92	Nanterre	Palais des Sports de Nanterre	3,000
Orléans Loiret	Orléans	Palais des Sports	3,222
Roanne	Roanne	Halle André Vacheresse	5,000
SIG Strasbourg	Strasbourg	Rhénus Sport	6,200

== Regular season ==
=== League table ===
Pos	Team	Pld	W	L	PF	PA	PD	Qualification or relegation
1	JDA Dijon	34	27	7	3083	2655	+428	Advance to playoffs
2	LDLC ASVEL	34	27	7	3083	2655	+428	Advance to playoffs
3	SIG Strasbourg	34	24	10	2814	2698	+116	Advance to playoffs
4	Monaco	34	24	10	2834	2594	+240	Advance to playoffs
5	JL Bourg	34	22	12	2910	2729	+181	Advance to playoffs
6	Metropolitans 92	34	20	14	2730	2626	+104	Advance to playoffs
7	Le Mans Sarthe	34	19	15	2909	2870	+39	Advance to playoffs
8	Orléans Loiret	34	19	15	2891	2732	+159	Advance to playoffs
9	Limoges CSP	34	17	17	2583	2664	−81	
10	Nanterre 92	34	17	17	2849	2870	−21	
11	ÉB Pau-Lacq-Orthez	34	16	18	2753	2819	−66	
12	Champagne Châlons Reims	34	13	21	2754	2896	−142	
13	ESSM Le Portel	34	13	21	2754	2751	+3	
14	Cholet	34	12	22	2712	2836	−124	
15	BCM Gravelines	34	11	23	2871	2863	+8	
16	Roanne	34	11	23	2712	2836	−124	
17	Élan Chalon (R)	34	10	24	2771	2961	−190	Relegation to Pro B
18	Boulazac Basket Dordogne (R)	34	4	30	2629	2626	+3	Relegation to Pro B

Source: LNB.fr
Rules for classification: 1) points; 2) Head-to-head; 3) Points difference; 4) Points scored.
(R) Relegated

== Playoffs ==
The playoffs were played in a single-elimination format and began on 20 June 2021 and ended 26 June 2021. The semifinals and finals were played at the Kindarena in Rouen.

Quarter-finals
20 June
JDA Dijon	83
Orléans	59
21 June
Monaco	91
JL Bourg	72
21 June
LDLC ASVEL	97
Metropolitans 92	79
21 June
SIG Strasbourg	79
Le Mans	68

Semi-finals
24 June – Rouen
JDA Dijon	79
Monaco	68
24 June – Rouen
LDLC ASVEL	83
SIG Strasbourg	67

Final
26 June – Rouen
JDA Dijon	74
LDLC ASVEL	87

== Awards ==
- MVP: Bonzie Colson (SIG Strasbourg)
- Final MVP David Lighty (LDLC ASVEL)
- Best Young Player: Victor Wembanyama (LDLC ASVEL)
- Best Defender: Moustapha Fall (Élan Chalon)
- Best Sixth Man: Pierre Pelos (JL Bourg)
- Best Coach: Zvezdan Mitrović (Monaco)

=== All-Pro A Team ===
Role	Player	Team
PG	Thomas Heurtel	LDLC ASVEL
G/F	Danilo Anđušić	JL Bourg
SF	Bonzie Colson	SIG Strasbourg
F/C	Ovie Soko	Le Mans
F/C	Moustapha Fall	Élan Chalon
