= Randal Falker =

American basketball player

CSU Sibiu
- Position: Power forward / center
- League: Romanian League

Personal information
- Born: July 22, 1985 (age 41) St. Louis, Missouri, U.S.
- Listed height: 6 ft 7 in (2.01 m)
- Listed weight: 254 lb (115 kg)

Career information
- High school: Gateway (St. Louis, Missouri)
- College: Southern Illinois (2004–2008)
- NBA draft: 2008: undrafted
- Playing career: 2008–present

Career history
- 2008–2012: Cholet
- 2012–2013: Beşiktaş
- 2013–2016: Nancy
- 2016–2017: AEK Athens
- 2017: Steaua Bucharest
- 2017–2018: Salta Basket
- 2018: Steaua Bucharest
- 2018–present: Sibiu

Career highlights
- French League Foreign Player's MVP (2014); French League Top Rebounder (2014); French League champion (2010); Match des Champions winner (2010); 2× First-team All-MVC (2007, 2008); 2x MVC All-Defensive Team (2007, 2008); MVC Defensive MVP (2007); MVC Most-Improved Team (2006)

Randal Alan Falker (born July 22, 1985) is an American professional basketball player for CSU Sibiu of the Romanian League. He is 2.01 m (6 ft 7 in) tall and weighs 115 kg (254 lb) power forward-center.

== High school career ==
Falker played high school basketball at Gateway. He was rated by Scout.com as a two-star prospect, the No. 3 power forward in the state of Missouri, and the No. 85 overall prospect nationally, in the class of 2003.

== College career ==
Falker played 3 seasons (2004–2007) in the NCAA college basketball championship, playing for Southern Illinois University's Salukis under coach Chris Lowery. As a sophomore, Falker's explosive rebounding and shot-blocking won him MVP honors at the Missouri Valley Conference. As a junior, the 6-foot-7-inch forward averaged 12.3 points and 7.7 rebounds per game for the Salukis. Falker led the league in blocked shots and helped SIU advance to the Sweet 16 round of the NCAA basketball tournament.

== Professional career ==
After not being drafted at the NBA's 2008 NBA draft, Falker decided to initiate his pro career in Europe. To this end, in the summer of 2008, he signed with Cholet Basket (French Pro A League), where he became a major player of the team, under head coach Erman Kunter, and one of the best rebounders of the league. With Cholet, he also played in European-wide competitions, such as the EuroChallenge 2008–09 season, where his team reached the Final game, the EuroCup 2009–10 season, and the EuroLeague 2010–11 season. In 2010, he won the French Pro A League championship with Cholet.

On September 26, 2012, Falker signed with Beşiktaş – one of the Turkish Basketball Super League teams, for the 2012–13 season.

On July 3, 2013, Falker signed a one-year contract with SLUC Nancy Basket of France. In February 2014, he extended his contract until 2016. At the end of the 2013–14 LNB Pro A season, he was named the league's best foreign player of the season.

On October 10, 2016, Falker signed with Greek club AEK Athens and on January 29, 2017, he signed with Steaua București of the Liga Națională. On August 13, 2018, Falker joined CSU Sibiu of the Romanian League.
