= LNB Pro A Best Sixth Man =

Basketball award

The LNB Pro A Best Sixth Man is an annual professional basketball award that is given by the top tier division in France, the LNB Pro A. It is awarded to the best sixth man: a player in a given season who regularly came off the bench. The award was introduced in 2014.

== Winners ==
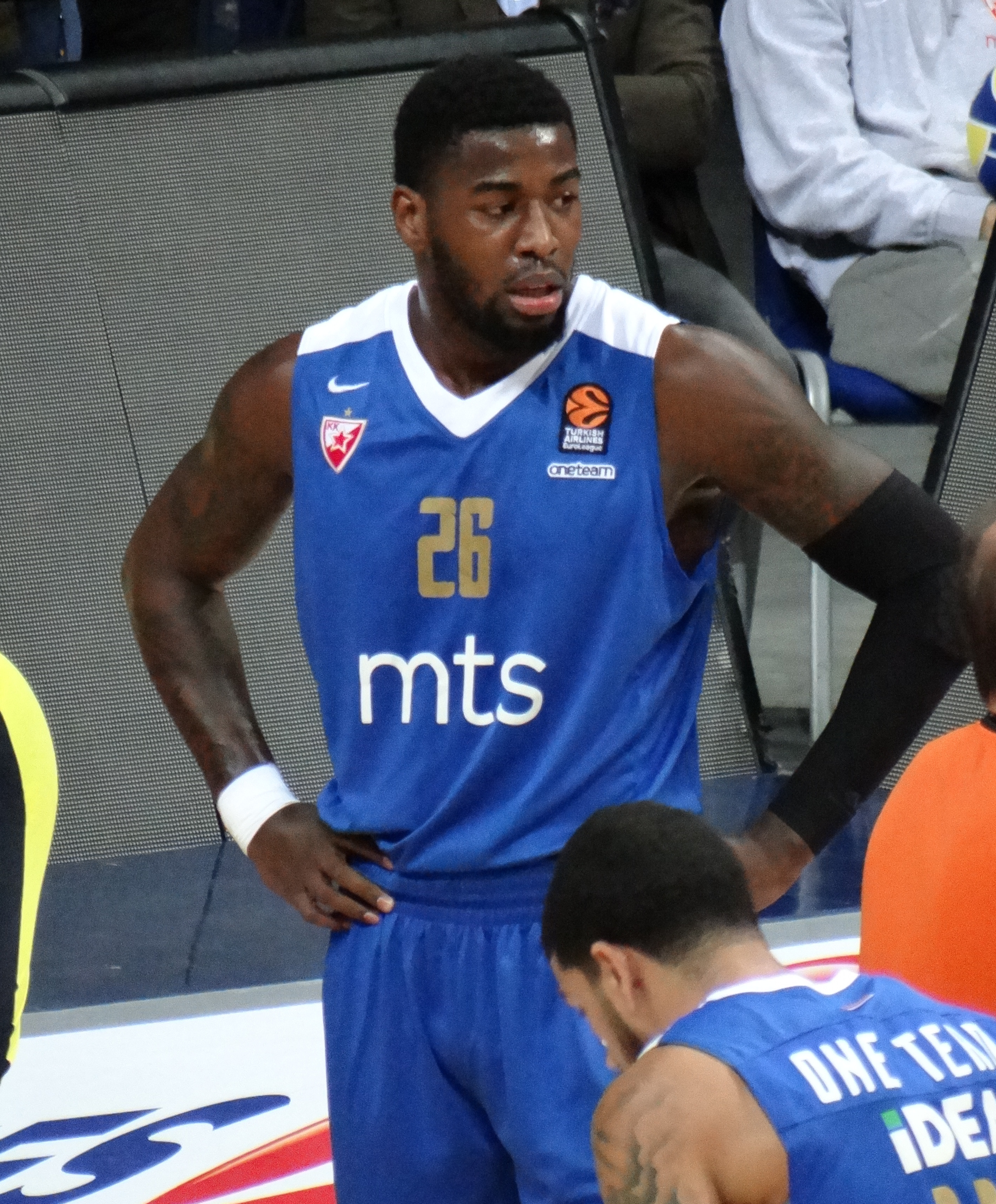
Mathias Lessort won the award in 2016

^	Denotes player who is still active in the Pro A
*	Inducted into the FIBA Hall of Fame
Player (X)	Denotes the number of times the player has received the award

Season	Player	Position	Nationality	Team
2014–15 (Note: Denotes season in which co-winners were awarded.)	Jamar Smith	Guard	United States	Limoges CSP
2014–15	Darnell Harris	Forward	United States	Orléans Loiret
2015–16	Mathias Lessort	Forward/center	France	Élan Chalon
2015–16	Matt Howard	Forward	United States	SIG Strasbourg
2016–17	Louis Labeyrie	Forward	France	SIG Strasbourg
2017–18	D. J. Stephens	Forward	United States	Le Mans
2018–19	Ali Traoré	Center	France	Strasbourg IG
2019–20	Not awarded (Note: There was no awarding in the 2019–20, because the season was cancelled due to the coronavirus pandemic in Europe.)			
2020–21	Pierre Pelos	Forward/center	France	JL Bourg
