= Adrien Moerman =

French basketball player (born 1988)

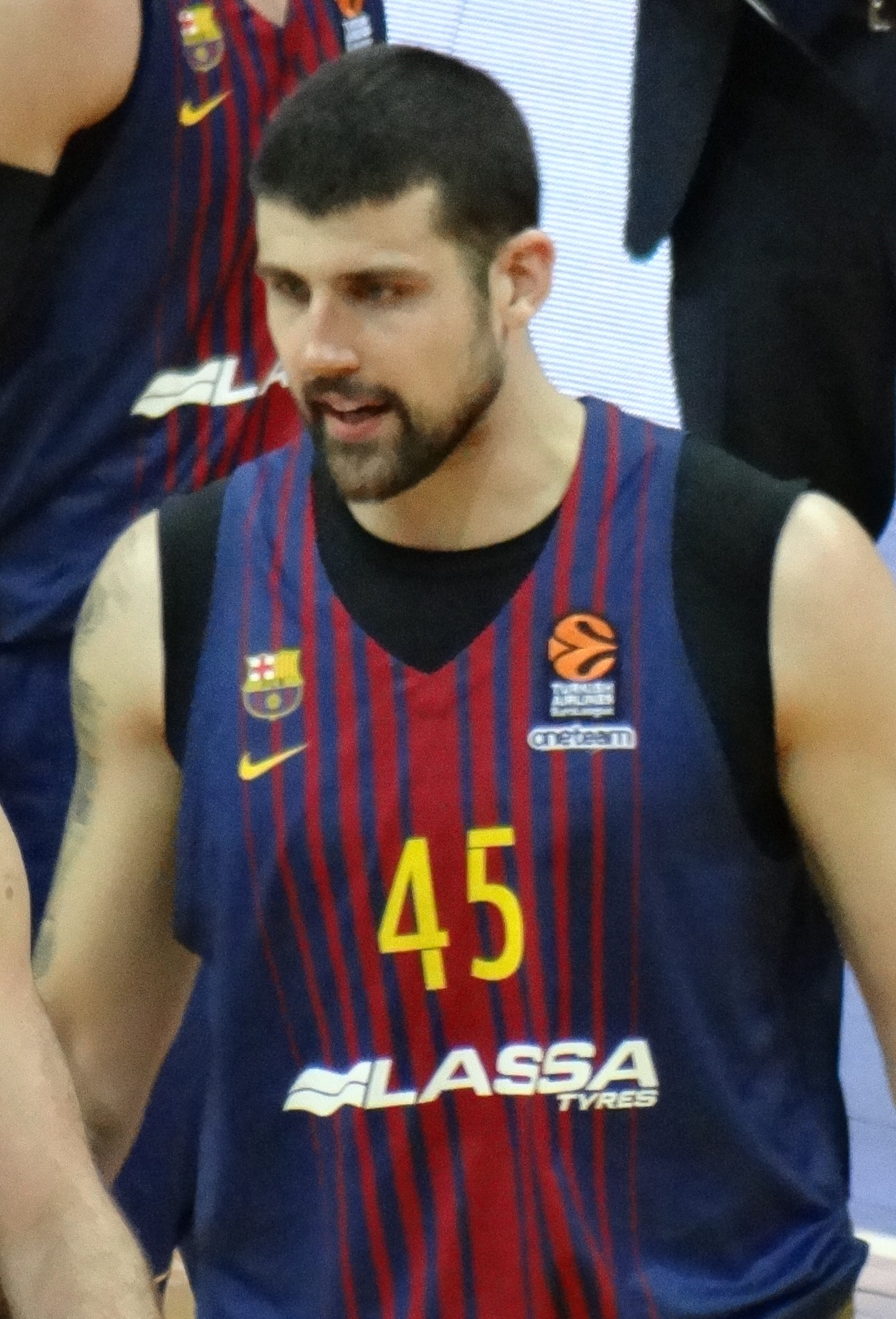
- Moerman with FC Barcelona in 2018

No. 18 – Fribourg Olympic
- Position: Power forward
- League: Swiss Basketball League

Personal information
- Born: 7 August 1988 (age 38) Fontenay-aux-Roses, France
- Listed height: 2.02 m (6 ft 8 in)
- Listed weight: 108 kg (238 lb)

Career information
- NBA draft: 2010: undrafted
- Playing career: 2005–present

Career history
- 2005–2007: Chorale Roanne
- 2007–2008: Nanterre
- 2008–2011: Orléans Loiret
- 2011–2012: Nancy
- 2012–2013: Bilbao
- 2013–2015: Limoges
- 2015–2016: Banvit
- 2016–2017: Darüşşafaka
- 2017–2018: FC Barcelona
- 2018–2022: Anadolu Efes
- 2022–2023: AS Monaco Basket
- 2023–2024: Zenit Saint Petersburg
- 2025: Taipei Taishin Mars
- 2026: Chorale Roanne
- 2026–present: Fribourg Olympic

Career highlights
- Turkish Cup winner (2022); VTB United League Supercup winner (2023); 2× EuroLeague champion (2021, 2022); 2× Turkish League champion (2019, 2021); 2× Turkish Presidential Cup winner (2018, 2019); Spanish Cup winner (2018); Turkish League Top Scorer (2016); Turkish League rebounding leader (2016); Turkish All-Star (2016); 3× LNB Pro A champion (2007, 2014, 2015); Pro B champion (2026); LNB Pro A MVP (2015); French Leaders Cup winner (2007); French Federation Cup winner (2010); 2× LNB Pro A All-Star (2012, 2014); LNB Pro A All-Star MVP (2014); LNB Pro B MVP (2008)
Medals
Men's basketball
Representing France
FIBA Under-19 World Cup
Bronze medal – third place	2007 Serbia	U-19
FIBA Europe Under-18 Championship
Gold medal – first place	2006 Greece	U-18
FIBA Europe Under-16 Championship
Gold medal – first place	2004 Greece	U-16

Adrien Rene Moerman (born 7 August 1988) is a French professional basketball player for Fribourg Olympic of the Swiss Basketball League. He was also a member of the senior French national team.

== Early years ==
Moerman was born in Fontenay-aux-Roses. He played youth age basketball with the French clubs Levallois Sporting Club Basket, from 2001 to 2003, and Chorale Roanne Basket, from 2003 to 2005.

== Professional career ==
Moerman began his pro career in 2005, with the senior men's team of Chorale Roanne Basket. He played for Roanne for two seasons. For the 2007–08 season, he signed with JSF Nanterre of the French 2nd Division. From 2008 to 2011, he played with the French club Orléans Loiret Basket. In July 2011, he signed with the French club SLUC Nancy Basket.

In June 2012, he signed a three-year deal with Bilbao Basket of the Spanish Liga ACB. After one season with the club, he left Bilbao. In June 2013, he returned to France, and signed a two-year deal with Limoges CSP. With Limoges, he won the 2013–14 French Pro A season's championship. In the 2014–15 season, Moerman was named the league MVP of the French Pro League.

In July 2015, he signed with the Turkish Super League club Banvit. After one season, he parted ways with Banvit. On 14 July 2016, he signed a 1+1 deal with the Turkish club Darüşşafaka Doğuş. The Turkish team opted out of their deal on 24 June 2017.

On 12 July 2017, he signed with the Spanish club FC Barcelona Lassa, for the 2017–18 season.

On 1 July 2018, Moerman signed a two year (1+1) deal with the Turkish club Anadolu Efes. He averaged 6.4 points, 4.6 rebounds, and 1.1 assists per game during the 2020–21 season. On 18 June 2021, Moerman renewed his contract with the Turkish club. On 29 June 2022, Moerman officially parted ways with the Turkish club after four seasons.

On July 22, 2022, he signed a one year deal with AS Monaco Basket.

On January 26, 2023, he signed with Zenit Saint Petersburg.

On January 22, 2025, Moerman signed with the Taipei Taishin Mars of the Taiwan Professional Basketball League (TPBL).

On September 22, 2026, he signed with Fribourg Olympic.

== Career statistics ==
Legend
GP	Games played	GS	Games started	MPG	Minutes per game
FG%	Field-goal percentage	3P%	3-point field-goal percentage	FT%	Free-throw percentage
RPG	Rebounds per game	APG	Assists per game	SPG	Steals per game
BPG	Blocks per game	PPG	Points per game	PIR	Performance index rating
**Bold**	Career high

=== EuroLeague ===
†	Denotes season in which Moerman won the EuroLeague
*	Led the league

Year	Team	GP	GS	MPG	FG%	3P%	FT%	RPG	APG	SPG	BPG	PPG	PIR
2009–10	Orléans	10	6	19.9	.328	.290	.833	2.9	.5	.7	**.7**	6.2	5.4
2011–12	Nancy	10	7	**29.4**	.431	.375	.684	5.6	.8	**1.4**	.5	11.9	10.9
2014–15	Limoges	10	9	27.0	.417	.237	.867	**6.9**	1.2	.8	.2	9.2	11.9
2016–17	Darüşşafaka	33	21	21.7	.396	.333	.769	5.1	.8	.9	.2	8.1	8.2
2017–18	Barcelona	30	23	22.3	.446	.324	.632	5.5	1.0	.6	.2	7.6	8.3
2018–19	Anadolu Efes	37*	**36***	29.1	.516	.401	**.872**	6.1	**1.5**	1.1	.3	**12.0**	**15.2**
2019–20	Anadolu Efes	12	0	14.2	**.581**	.385	.700	3.1	.4	.5	—	5.2	6.5
2020–21†	Anadolu Efes	**41***	22	20.5	.486	.343	.567	4.6	1.1	.6	.1	6.4	8.5
2021–22†	Anadolu Efes	40*	28	24.7	.486	**.415**	.714	5.3	.6	.4	.5	8.4	10.7
2022–23	Monaco	16	2	14.6	.239	.227	.500	2.8	.7	.4	—	2.9	2.1
Career		239	154	22.8	.453	.351	.730	5.0	.9	.7	.3	8.0	9.4

== National team career ==
Moerman was a member of the junior national basketball teams of France. With France's junior national teams, he won gold medals at the 2004 FIBA Europe Under-16 Championship, and the 2006 FIBA Europe Under-18 Championship. He also won the bronze medal at the 2007 FIBA Under-19 World Cup.

Moerman has also been a member of the senior French national team. He played with France at the 2016 Manila FIBA World Olympic Qualifying Tournament.
