= Ousmane Camara (basketball) =

French basketball player (born 1989)

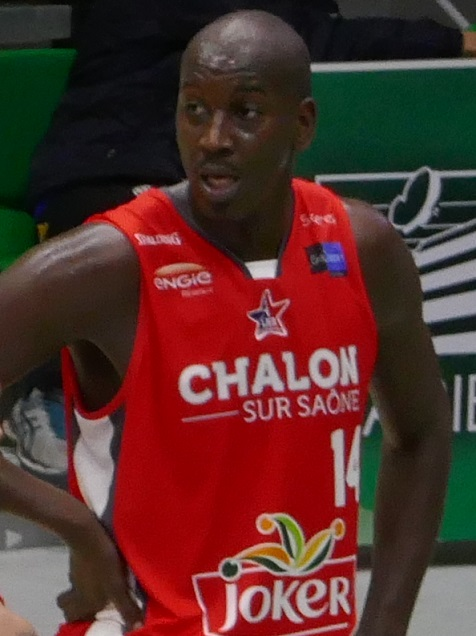

Free Agent
- Position: Center

Personal information
- Born: 12 May 1989 (age 37) Mont-Saint-Aignan, France
- Listed height: 2.02 m (6 ft 8 in)

Career information
- NBA draft: 2011: undrafted
- Playing career: 2009–present

Career history
- 2009–2012: STB Le Havre
- 2012–2014: BCM Gravelines
- 2014–2017: Limoges CSP
- 2017–2021: Élan Chalon
- 2022: Rouen Métropole Basket
- 2022–2023: ALM Évreux Basket
- 2023–present: AS Loon Plage Basket

Career highlights
- French League Finals MVP (2015); French Leaders Cup winner (2013); French League champion (2015)

Ousmane Camara (born 12 May 1989) is a French professional basketball player for AS Loon Plage Basket of the Nationale Masculine 1 (NM1).

== Professional career ==
In the 2014–15 season, Camara played his first season for Limoges CSP. With the team he won the LNB Pro A championship, after Limoges beat Strasbourg IG 3–1 in the Finals. Camara was named the Finals MVP, after averaging 7.25 points per game in the series.

== Statistics ==
Season	Team	League	PPG	RPG	APG	EFF
2012–13	BCM Gravelines	Pro A	5.6	5.7	0.3	9.3
2013–14	BCM Gravelines	Pro A	7.5	8.1	0.7	12.8
2014–15	Limoges	Pro A	4.0	3.9	0.5	5.7

Champions
