= Pierre Pelos =

French basketball player (born 1992)

- Pelos with Gran Canaria in 2024

No. 13 – Gran Canaria
- Position: Power forward / center
- League: Liga ACB; EuroLeague

Personal information
- Born: August 19, 1992 (age 34) Agen, France
- Listed height: 2.05 m (6 ft 9 in)
- Listed weight: 105 kg (231 lb)

Career information
- Playing career: 2012–present

Career history
- 2012–2014: Élan Béarnais
- 2013–2014: →Pau Nord-Est
- 2014–2015: Union Tarbes-Lourdes
- 2015–2016: Saint-Chamond
- 2016–2017: JL Bourg
- 2017–2019: Fos Provence
- 2019–2023: JL Bourg
- 2023–present: Gran Canaria

Career highlights
- LNB Pro A Best Sixth Man (2021)
Medals
Men's basketball
Representing France
Silver medal – second place	2012 Slovenia	U20 Team

Pierre Pelos (born August 19, 1992) is a French professional basketball player for Gran Canaria of the Primera FEB. Standing at a height of 2.05 m (6 ft 8 1/2 in), Pelos plays both as a power forward and a center. He has also represented the French national team internationally.

== Early life and youth career ==
Pelos grew up in the Gers region. Born into a family with a basketball background, he started playing for local club Association Sportive Montaltaise. Pelos also played for Union Gascogne Basket and Auch Basket Club before being recruited by Élan Béarnais in 2011.

== Professional career ==
Pelos started his professional career with Élan Béarnais, making his debut in the LNB Pro B. He would go on to play for Union Tarbes-Lourdes in the Nationale Masculine 1 and for Saint-Chamond in the LNB Pro B. On June 24, 2016, Pelos signed with JL Bourg of the LNB Pro B on a one-season contract.

=== Fos Provence (2017–2019) ===
In June 2017, Pelos signed with Fos Provence of the LNB Pro B. Pelos helped Fos Provence achieve promotion to the 2018–19 Pro A season after winning the 2017–18 Pro B promotion playoffs, in which he was selected as the final's MVP.

=== JL Bourg (2019–2023) ===
On May 22, 2019, Pelos returned to JL Bourg for the 2019–20 Pro A season. With Bourg, he won the Best Sixth Man award for the 2020–21 Pro A season. On June 4, 2021, Bourg announced it had reached an agreement to extend Pelos' contract through 2024. On July 27, 2023, Bourg announced it had reached an agreement to part ways with Pelos.

=== Gran Canaria (2023–present) ===
On July 28, 2023, Pelos signed with Gran Canaria of the Liga ACB and the EuroCup, signing a one-season deal. On July 2, 2024, Pelos signed a one-season contract extension with the Canarians. In July 2026, Gran Canaria announced Pelos would remain for the next season after the team's relegation to Primera FEB.

== National team career ==
Pelos has represented France internationally. In 2012, he was selected for the France U20 national team that took part in the 2012 U20 European Championship in which they were runners-up. He made his debut with the senior French national team in a 2023 World Cup qualifier against the Czech Republic.

== Career statistics ==
Legend
GP	Games played	GS	Games started	MPG	Minutes per game
FG%	Field goal percentage	3P%	3-point field goal percentage	FT%	Free throw percentage
RPG	Rebounds per game	APG	Assists per game	SPG	Steals per game
BPG	Blocks per game	PPG	Points per game	**Bold**	Career high

=== EuroCup ===
Year	Team	GP	GS	MPG	FG%	3P%	FT%	RPG	APG	SPG	BPG	PPG	PIR
2020–21	JL Bourg	16	1	23.5	.523	.382	.900	5.7	1.0	.7	.6	11.5	13.1
2021–22	JL Bourg	16	7	20.6	.538	.463	.913	3.8	.9	.6	.4	10.9	11.8
2022–23	JL Bourg	19	2	18.8	.581	.490	.875	5.4	.6	.4	.4	9.9	12.3
2023–24	Gran Canaria	19	7	17.0	.529	.429	.786	2.9	.9	.5	.4	6.1	6.6
2024–25	Gran Canaria	25	2	16.9	.588	.489	.545	3.0	.7	.6	.2	6.7	6.8
Career		95	19	19.0	.553	.450	.840	4.1	.8	.5	.4	8.7	9.8

=== Domestic leagues ===
Year	Team	League	GP	MPG	FG%	3P%	FT%	RPG	APG	SPG	BPG	PPG
2023–24	(Spain) Gran Canaria	ACB	34	18.2	.469	.372	.806	4.0	.8	.6	.5	7.1
2024–25	(Spain) Gran Canaria	ACB	34	18.1	.483	.430	.862	3.5	.8	.7	.4	6.6
2025–26	(Spain) Gran Canaria	ACB	34	21.5	.536	.412	.789	5.1	1.1	.8	.5	9.4
