= Piétrus =

Piétrus is a surname. Notable people with the surname include:

- Florent Piétrus (born 1981), French basketball player
- Mickaël Piétrus (born 1982), French basketball player, brother of Florent
