= Sam Scarber =

American football player and actor (1949–2026

No. 30
- Position: Fullback

Personal information
- Born: June 24, 1949; St. Louis, Missouri, U.S.
- Died: March 8, 2026 (aged 76)
- Listed height: 6 ft 3 in (1.91 m)
- Listed weight: 230 lb (104 kg)

Career information
- High school: John O'Fallon Tech (St. Louis)
- College: New Mexico
- NFL draft: 1971: 3rd round, 69th overall pick

Career history
- Dallas Cowboys (1971)*; Los Angeles Rams (1971)*; Edmonton Eskimos (1972–1973); Detroit Wheels (1974); San Diego Chargers (1975–1976); Oakland Raiders (1978)
- * Offseason or practice squad member only

Awards and highlights
- All-WAC (1970)

Career NFL statistics
- Rushing attempts: 76
- Rushing yards: 304
- Rushing TDs: 2
- Stats at Pro Football Reference

Sam Willis Scarber Jr. (June 24, 1949 – March 8, 2026) was an American actor and American football fullback in the National Football League (NFL) for the San Diego Chargers. He played college football at the University of New Mexico and was selected by the Dallas Cowboys in the third round (69th overall) of the 1971 NFL draft.

== Early life ==
Scarber was born in St. Louis, Missouri, on June 24, 1949. He attended John O'Fallon Technical High School. He moved on to play at Northeastern Junior College, before transferring to the University of New Mexico, where the team used a triple-option running offense.

In 1968, he registered the school's second longest pass play (88 yards) against the University of Texas at El Paso. In 1969, he was the team's leading rusher (534 yards) and had a school record 38 carries against the University of Kansas.

In 1970, the team led the nation averaging 350 rushing yards per game and he was the conference's leading rusher (961 yards with a 5.2 average). He set season school records in scoring (78 points), touchdowns (13) and received All-WAC honors.

He finished his college career as the school's second all-time career rusher (1,531 yards) behind Don Perkins. He also practiced basketball.

== Professional career ==
=== Dallas Cowboys ===
Scarber was selected by the Dallas Cowboys in the third round (69th overall) of the 1971 NFL draft. He was waived on August 31.

=== Los Angeles Rams ===
Scarber signed with the Los Angeles Rams as a free agent on September 2 1971. He was waived on September 16.

=== Edmonton Eskimos ===
The Edmonton Eskimos signed him before the start of their training camp in 1972. He was limited physically during the season, after separating both shoulders in different incidents. He was waived on July 27, 1973.

=== Detroit Wheels ===
In 1974, he signed with the Detroit Wheels of the World Football League, where he was the starter at running back and their leading rusher with 606 yards (4.4 average). The Wheels were the first WFL franchise to fold in 1974. The league held a dispersal draft for their players and he was selected by the Southern California Sun.

=== San Diego Chargers ===
On June 20, 1975, the San Diego Chargers signed him to serve as a backup running back. He was waived on August 29, 1977.

=== Oakland Raiders ===
In 1978, he was signed by the Oakland Raiders. He was released on August 16.

== Acting career ==
=== Television appearances ===
On Cheers, Scarber played the role of Lewis, one of Cliff's co-workers at the post office. On "Santa Barbara" Scarber played Zachary Terry, the robber who attacked Eden Capwell and took Alice Jackson, Caroline Wilson and Lionel Lockridge as hostages. On Hill Street Blues, he played Dr. Otis Redman, an ER doctor who was a former professional American Football player.

=== Film appearances ===
After supporting roles in Shocker, Against All Odds, and The Karate Kid, Sam played arm wrestler Harry Boscoe in the 1987 Sylvester Stallone film Over The Top.

== Death ==
Scarber died on March 8, 2026, at the age of 76.
