= Alex Acker =

American-Italian basketball player

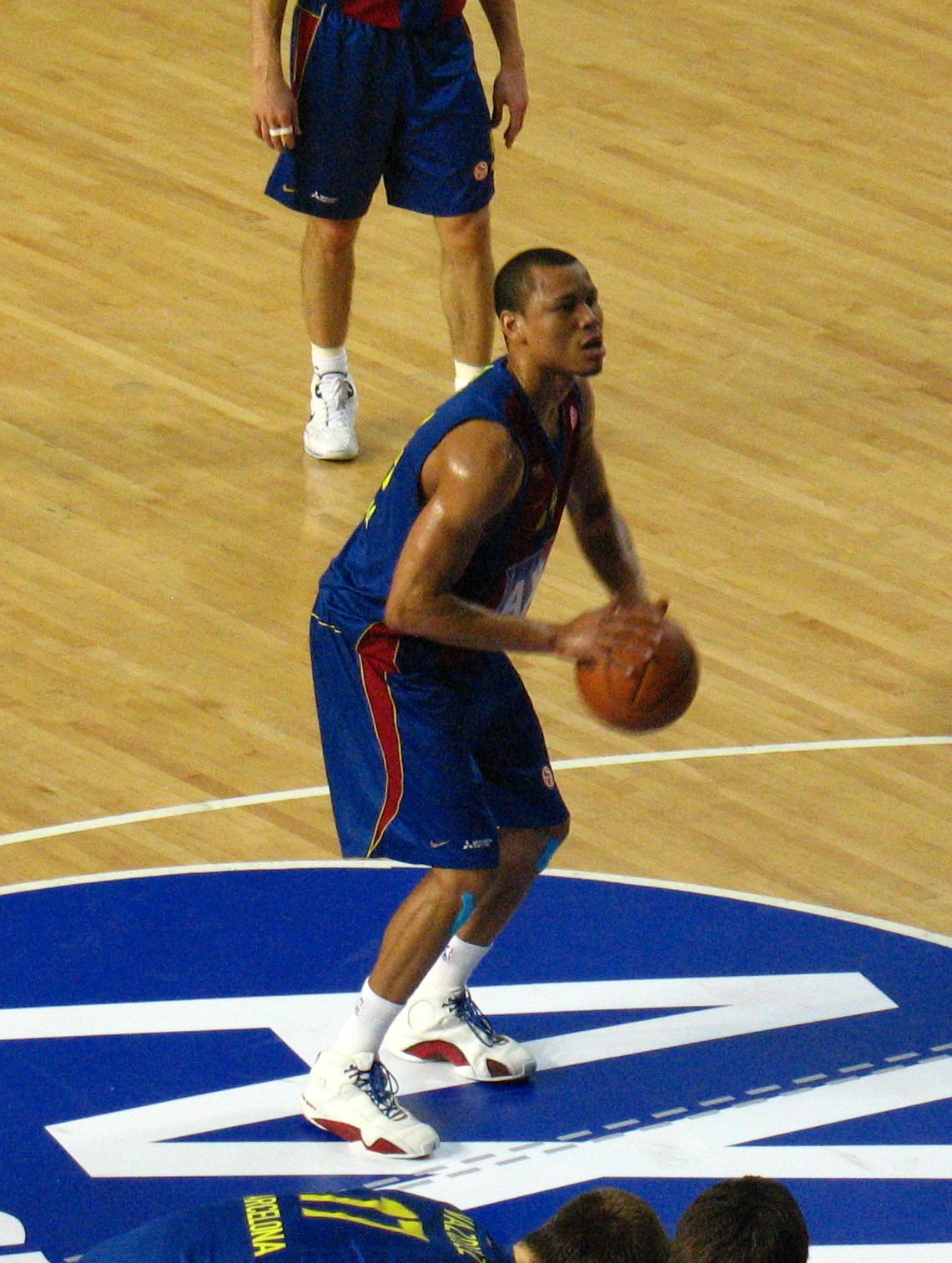
- Acker with FC Barcelona in 2008

Personal information
- Born: January 21, 1983 (age 43) Compton, California, U.S.
- Listed height: 6 ft 5 in (1.96 m)
- Listed weight: 185 lb (84 kg)

Career information
- High school: Eisenhower (Rialto, California)
- College: Pepperdine (2002–2005)
- NBA draft: 2005: 2nd round, 60th overall pick
- Drafted by: Detroit Pistons
- Playing career: 2005–2021
- Position: Shooting guard
- Number: 6, 3

Career history
- 2005–2006: Detroit Pistons
- 2006: →Fayetteville Patriots
- 2006–2007: Olympiacos
- 2007–2008: FC Barcelona
- 2008–2009: Detroit Pistons
- 2009: →Fort Wayne Mad Ants
- 2009: Los Angeles Clippers
- 2009–2010: Olimpia Milano
- 2010–2012: Le Mans Sarthe
- 2012: Asseco Prokom Gdynia
- 2013: Boulazac Dordogne
- 2013: ASVEL
- 2013–2014: Limoges
- 2014: İstanbul BB
- 2015: ASVEL
- 2015–2016: Sidigas Avellino
- 2016–2017: Pallacanestro Cantù
- 2017–2018: Apollon Patras
- 2020–2021: Gallarate Basket

Career highlights
- LNB Pro A champion (2014); LNB Pro A Finals MVP (2014); First-team All-WCC (2005)
- Stats at NBA.com
- Stats at Basketball Reference

Alexander Maurice Acker (born January 21, 1983) is an American-Italian former professional basketball player. He played college basketball for Pepperdine University. Acker was selected by the Detroit Pistons as the final pick of the 2005 NBA draft and spent two seasons in the National Basketball Association (NBA) with the Pistons and Los Angeles Clippers.

== College career ==
Acker attended Pepperdine University, where he played college basketball with the Pepperdine Waves, from 2002 to 2005.

== Professional career ==
=== NBA ===
After college, Acker was selected by the Detroit Pistons, with the last pick in the second round (60th overall) of the 2005 NBA draft. He played with the Pistons in 5 games, during the 2005–06 season, and he was also assigned to the NBA Development League's Fayetteville Patriots, on February 27, 2006.

=== Europe ===
From 2006 to 2008, Acker played with the Greek club Olympiacos, for whom he averaged 14.3 points, 5.6 rebounds, 2.4 assists, and 1.8 steals, in 22 games played (2006–07 EuroLeague season), and with the Spanish club AXA FC Barcelona, averaging 5.5 points, 1.9 rebounds and 0.7 assists and 0.7 steals, in 22 games played (2007–08 EuroLeague season).

=== Return to NBA ===
On September 29, 2008, it was announced that Acker had signed a deal with his former NBA team, the Detroit Pistons. On February 16, 2009, Acker was traded by Detroit to the Los Angeles Clippers, along with a second-round draft pick in the 2011 NBA draft, in exchange for a conditional second-round draft pick in the 2013 NBA draft. This trade was completed primarily for the Pistons to clear salary cap space, and to open up a roster spot for trade flexibility.

=== Return to Europe ===
On August 22, 2009, Acker signed with Armani Jeans Milano of Italy's LBA, for the 2009–10 season. In September 2010, Acker signed a one-year deal with Le Mans of France's LNB Pro A. On June 30, 2011, he re-signed with Le Mans for one more season.

On October 16, 2012, Acker signed a one-year contract with Asseco Prokom Gdynia of Poland's PLK. On December 21, 2012, he parted ways with Prokom. On February 14, 2013, he signed a two-month deal with Boulazac Dordogne of France.

On May 2, 2013, he signed with ASVEL of France, for the rest of the season. On June 28, 2013, he signed a one-year deal with Limoges of France. With Limoges, he won the 2013–14 LNB Pro A championship, and he was named the MVP of the Finals.

On October 25, 2014, Acker signed with İstanbul BB of Turkey. On December 29, 2014, he returned to France, and signed with his former team, ASVEL Basket. On July 10, 2015, he parted ways with ASVEL.

On August 26, 2015, Acker signed with Sidigas Avellino for the 2015–16 season. On October 27, 2016, Acker signed with Pallacanestro Cantù for the 2016–17 season. On October 25, 2017, Acker signed with Apollon Patras, of the Greek 2nd Division.

== Career statistics ==
Legend
GP	Games played	GS	Games started	MPG	Minutes per game
FG%	Field-goal percentage	3P%	3-point field-goal percentage	FT%	Free-throw percentage
RPG	Rebounds per game	APG	Assists per game	SPG	Steals per game
BPG	Blocks per game	PPG	Points per game	PIR	Performance index rating
**Bold**	Career high

=== NBA ===
==== Regular season ====
Year	Team	GP	GS	MPG	FG%	3P%	FT%	RPG	APG	SPG	BPG	PPG
2005–06	Detroit	5	0	7.0	.250	.200	.000	1.0	**.8**	.2	.0	1.8
2008–09	Detroit	7	0	2.9	.364	.000	**.500**	.3	.1	**.3**	.1	1.3
2008–09	L.A. Clippers	**18**	0	**9.9**	**.400**	**.438**	**.500**	**1.2**	.6	.2	**.2**	**3.5**
Career		30	0	7.8	.370	.320	.500	1.0	.5	.2	.1	2.7

=== EuroLeague ===
Year	Team	GP	GS	MPG	FG%	3P%	FT%	RPG	APG	SPG	BPG	PPG	PIR
2006–07	Olympiacos	**22**	**22**	**32.6**	.492	.318	**.868**	**5.6**	**2.4**	**1.6**	**.4**	**14.3**	**15.7**
2007–08	FC Barcelona	**22**	17	17.3	.477	.279	.821	1.9	.7	.7	.2	5.5	4.7
2009–10	Olimpia Milano	4	4	27.3	**.542**	.222	.375	2.8	1.5	1.5	.3	8.8	5.3
2012–13	Asseco Prokom Gdynia	9	7	22.5	.300	**.381**	.818	2.7	0.7	0.3	.1	6.3	2.4
Career		57	50	24.7	.469	.307	.826	3.5	1.4	1.1	.2	9.2	8.6
