= Boulazac Basket Dordogne =

- Nickname: BBD
- Leagues: LNB Élite
- Founded: 1992; 34 years ago
- Arena: Le Palio
- Capacity: 5,200
- Location: Boulazac, France
- Team colors: White, Black, Purple and Green
- President: Laurent Serres
- Head coach: Alexandre Ménard
- Championships: 1 Second Division; 1 Third Division; 1 Fourth Division
- Website: boulazac-basket-dordogne.com
Home	Away	Third

Boulazac Basket Dordogne, also known as BBD or simply Boulazac, is a French professional basketball club, based in Boulazac. The team currently plays in the LNB Élite, the highest level of basketball in France. The club plays its games in its home arena Le Palio, which can host up to 5,200 spectators.

== History ==
Originally playing in Périgueux as US périgourdine, the club moved to the city of Boulazac (suburb of Périgueux) in 1992 when a new sport hall was constructed. The club evolved in French Pro B from 2005 to 2012. The club finished 2nd in the 2011–12 LNB Pro B and was finalist in the play-offs, gaining the right to compete in top Pro A league for the 2012–13 season.

In 2024–25, Boulazac won the LNB Pro B championship for the first time in club history and earned promotion back to the Betclic ÉLITE. In its first season back in the top division, Boulazac finished the 2025–26 regular season in 12th place with a 12–18 record. Boulazac secured third place in the LNB SuperCup third place play off by defeating Paris Basketball (96-80) at Roland-Garros on september 20, 2025.

== Season by season ==
Champions	Runners-up	Playoff berth	Promoted

Season	Tier	League	Finish	Wins	Losses	Win%	Playoffs	French Cup	Head coach
Boulazac
2011–12	II	Pro B	2nd	25	9	.735	Won quarterfinals (SOMB Boulogne), 2–1; Won semifinals (Châlons-Reims), 2–0; Lost finals (Limoges CSP), 0–1		Sylvain Lautié
2012–13	I	Pro A	15th	11	19	.367	–		Sylvain Lautié
2013–14	II	Pro B	13th	19	25	.432			Sylvain Lautié
2014–15	II	Pro B	4th	24	15	.615	Won quarterfinals (Roanne), 2–0; Lost semifinals (Denain), 1–2		Sylvain Lautié; Antoine Michon (interim)
2015–16	II	Pro B	4th	23	15	.605	Won quarterfinals (Nantes), 2–0; Lost semifinals (Évreux), 1–2		Antoine Michon
2016–17	II	Pro B	2nd	25	17	.595	Won quarterfinals (Le Havre), 2–1; Won semifinals (Évreux), 2–0; Won finals (Nantes), 2–1		Claude Bergeaud
2017–18	I	Pro A	17th (Note: In 2018, Boulazac stayed in the Pro A after Hyères-Toulon Var Basket lost its license.)	12	22	.353	–	Runner-up	Thomas Andrieux
2018–19	I	Pro A	10th	16	17	.485			Thomas Andrieux
2019–20	I	Pro A	17th	7	17	.292			Thomas Andrieux
2020–21	I	Pro A	18th	4	30	.118			Thomas Andrieux
2021–22	II	Pro B	5th	21	13	.618	Won quarterfinals (Sharks Antibes), 2–1; Lost semifinals (Elan Chalon), 0–2		Nikola Antic; Alexandre Ménard
2022–23	II	Pro B	12th	15	19	.441			Alexandre Ménard
2023–24	II	Pro B	3rd	22	12	.647	Won quarterfinals (Champagne Basket), 2–0; Won semifinals (JA Vichy), 2–1; Lost finals (Stade Rochelais), 0–2		Alexandre Ménard
2024–25	II	Pro B	1st	29	9	.763	Promoted		Alexandre Ménard
2025–26	I	Betclic ÉLITE	12th	12	18	.400	–	Lost Round of 32 (La Rochelle), 79–90	Alexandre Ménard

== Players ==
Boulazac logo used until 2019

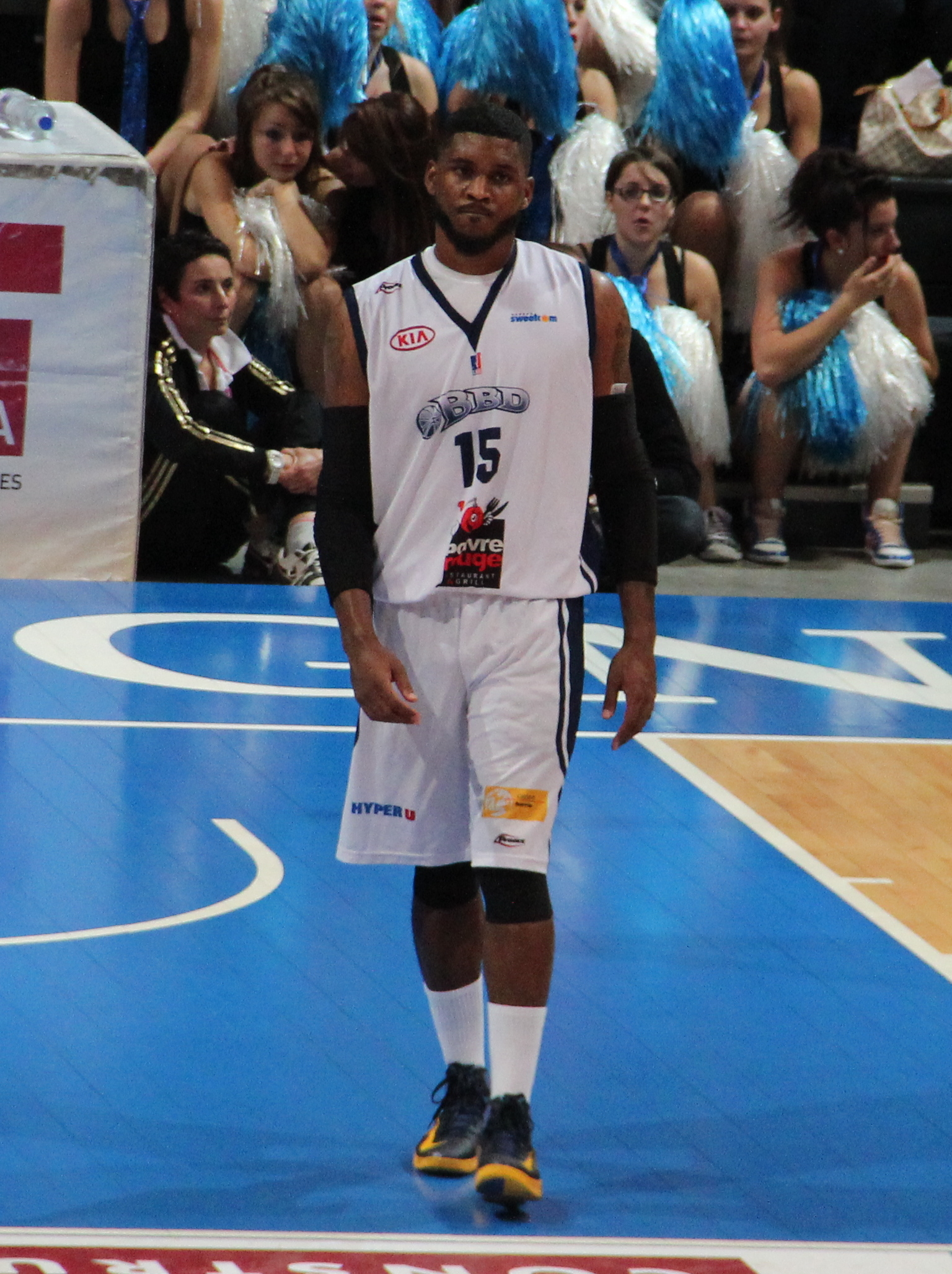
Darryl Monroe

=== Current roster ===
Note: Flags indicate national team eligibility at FIBA-sanctioned events. Players may hold other non-FIBA nationalities not displayed.

Boulazac Basket Dordogne roster
Players
Coaches

Pos.	No.	Nat.	Name	Ht.	Wt.	Age
G	1	(United States)	Estrada, Aaron	1.91 m (6 ft 3 in)	86 kg (190 lb)	25 – 3 February 2001
F/C	2	(Nigeria)	Anochili-Killen, Obinna	2.05 m (6 ft 9 in)	90 kg (198 lb)	25 – 27 September 2001
PG	4	(France)	Pierrot, Yanis (Y)	1.82 m (6 ft 0 in)	72 kg (159 lb)	17 – 12 May 2009
F	7	(France)	Eliezer-Vanerot, Cyrille	2.02 m (6 ft 8 in)	91 kg (201 lb)	30 – 1 August 1996
PG	8	(France)	Eito, Antoine	1.88 m (6 ft 2 in)	83 kg (183 lb)	38 – 6 April 1988
F	9	(United Kingdom)	Uduje, Joshua	1.98 m (6 ft 6 in)	79 kg (174 lb)	24 – 27 April 2002
G	11	(United States)	Bogues, Shannon	1.90 m (6 ft 3 in)	88 kg (194 lb)	29 – 20 February 1997
C	12	(Canada)	Moncrieffe, Matthew-Alexander	2.01 m (6 ft 7 in)	98 kg (216 lb)	25 – 22 March 2001
C	13	(France)	Miyem, Essomé	2.10 m (6 ft 11 in)	100 kg (220 lb)	25 – 15 July 2001
PG	21	(United States)	Beverley, Patrick (injured)	1.88 m (6 ft 2 in)	82 kg (181 lb)	38 – 12 July 1988
C	23	(Nigeria)	Omenaka, Godwin	2.06 m (6 ft 9 in)	99 kg (218 lb)	26 – 9 October 2000
F	24	(France)	Courant, Bastien	2.01 m (6 ft 7 in)	70 kg (154 lb)	20 – 2 March 2006
G	25	(France)	Ville, Thomas	1.88 m (6 ft 2 in)	84 kg (185 lb)	31 – 6 May 1995
F	32	(United States)	Shumate, J. T.	2.03 m (6 ft 8 in)	95 kg (209 lb)	27 – 28 June 1999
G	87	(France)	Lasalvary, Hugo (Y)	1.90 m (6 ft 3 in)	80 kg (176 lb)	19 – 22 April 2007

Head coach

- (France) Alexandre Ménard

Assistant coach(es)

- (France) Jordan Faligant
- (France) Maxime Nelaton

Legend

- (C) Team captain
- (IN) Inactive
- (Y) Youth player
- Injured

- Roster
Updated: October 28, 2026

=== Depth chart ===
Pos.	Starting 5	Bench 1	Bench 2	Bench 3	Inactive
C	Essomé Miyem †	Obinna Anochili-Killen ^	Godwin Omenaka ^	Matthew-Alexander Moncrieffe *
PF	Cyrille Eliezer-Vanerot †	Bastien Courant †
SF	Joshua Uduje °	J. T. Shumate *
SG	Shannon Bogues *	Aaron Estrada *		Hugo Lasalvary ‡
PG	Antoine Eïto †	Thomas Ville †	Yanis Pierrot ‡		Patrick Beverley * (injured)

Notes: The LNB Élite strictly enforces a "JFL" (Joueur Formé Localement) system to protect domestic talent, alongside limits on international transfers. Blue † – JFL player; (Note: A JFL player is a player that played for at least three years between the ages of 12 and 21 on a French team. To qualify as a JFL, a player does not necessarily need French citizenship but must have spent at least three seasons training in a French club’s youth academy system between the ages of 12 and 21. Minimum of 4 JFL players must be included on the active roster.) Red * – foreign player; (Note: A foreign player is a player from outside France. Maximum of 4 "Foreigners" (Non-EU / Non-Cotonou) are allowed. Players from the United States or Canada typically fall under this category.) Purple °; – Cotonou player (Note: "Cotonou+" players: Players holding passports from European Union nations or countries party to the Cotonou Agreement do not count against the 4-"Foreigner" cap, but they do count toward the overall 6 non-JFL maximum.) Gold ^; – non-JFL player (Note: "Non-JFL" players: players who do not qualify as "Locally Trained" (Joueur Formé Localement) under French basketball regulations. A maximum of 6 non-JFL players are allowed on a game sheet.) Green ‡ – youth player (Note: "Youth" players: players who are under the age of 20. In LNB Élite, there is no strict mandatory minimum requirement forcing teams to put youth players on their active 12-man game sheet. However, the league uses a highly integrated structure that connects senior squads directly to youth development through the "Espoirs" (U21) system.)

== Notable players ==
Note: Flags indicate national team eligibility at FIBA-sanctioned events. Players may hold other non-FIBA nationalities not displayed.

Criteria

To appear in this section a player must have either:

- Set a club record or won an individual award while at the club
- Played at least one official international match for their national team at any time
- Played at least one official NBA match at any time.

- (France) Alpha Kaba
- (Algeria) Mehdi Cheriet
- (Canada) Johnny Berhanemeskel
- (Canada) Kenny Chery
- (Czech Republic) Patrik Auda
- (Finland) Jacob Grandison
- (Greece) Vassilis Toliopoulos
- (Netherlands) Nicolas de Jong
- (Switzerland) David Ramseier
- (Panama) Akil Mitchell
- (Poland) Aaron Cel
- (United Kingdom) Ovie Soko
- (United States) Alex Acker
- (United States) Karvel Anderson
- (United States) Patrick Beverley
- (United States) Kyle Gibson
- (United States) Frank Hassell
- (United States) Travis Leslie
- (United States) Trenton Meacham
- (United States) Darryl Monroe
- (United States) Ryan Pearson
- (United States) Quinton Ross
- (United States) Tony Snell
