= Sylvain Lautié =

French basketball coach

SLUC Nancy Basket
- Position: Head coach
- League: LNB Élite

Personal information
- Born: 11 June 1968 (age 58) Saint-Cloud, France
- Coaching career: 1990–present

Career history

Coaching
- 1990–1994: Levallois SC (assistant)
- 1994–1995: Poissy-Chatou Basket (assistant)
- 1996–1999: Poissy-Chatou Basket
- 1999–2000: Montepellier
- 2000–2001: SLUC Nancy (assistant)
- 2001: SLUC Nancy
- 2001–2002: SLUC Nancy (assistant)
- 2002: SLUC Nancy
- 2004–2007: Levallois SC
- 2005: Mali (women)
- 2007–2008: Besançon BCD
- 2010–2014: Boulazac
- 2014–2016: ES Gardonne
- 2015: Mali (men)
- 2016: SAP Vaucluse
- 2017–2018: Basket Esch
- 2017–2021: Mali (women)
- 2021–present: SLUC Nancy Basket

Sylvain Lautié (born 11 June 1968 in Saint-Cloud) is a French professional basketball coach, currently working as head coach of SLUC Nancy Basket of the LNB Élite. He has worked in various positions for the Mali national team, he coached the men at the 2015 Afrobasket, and the women's team at the 2017, 2019, and 2021 Women's AfroBasket.
