= Florent Piétrus =

French basketball player

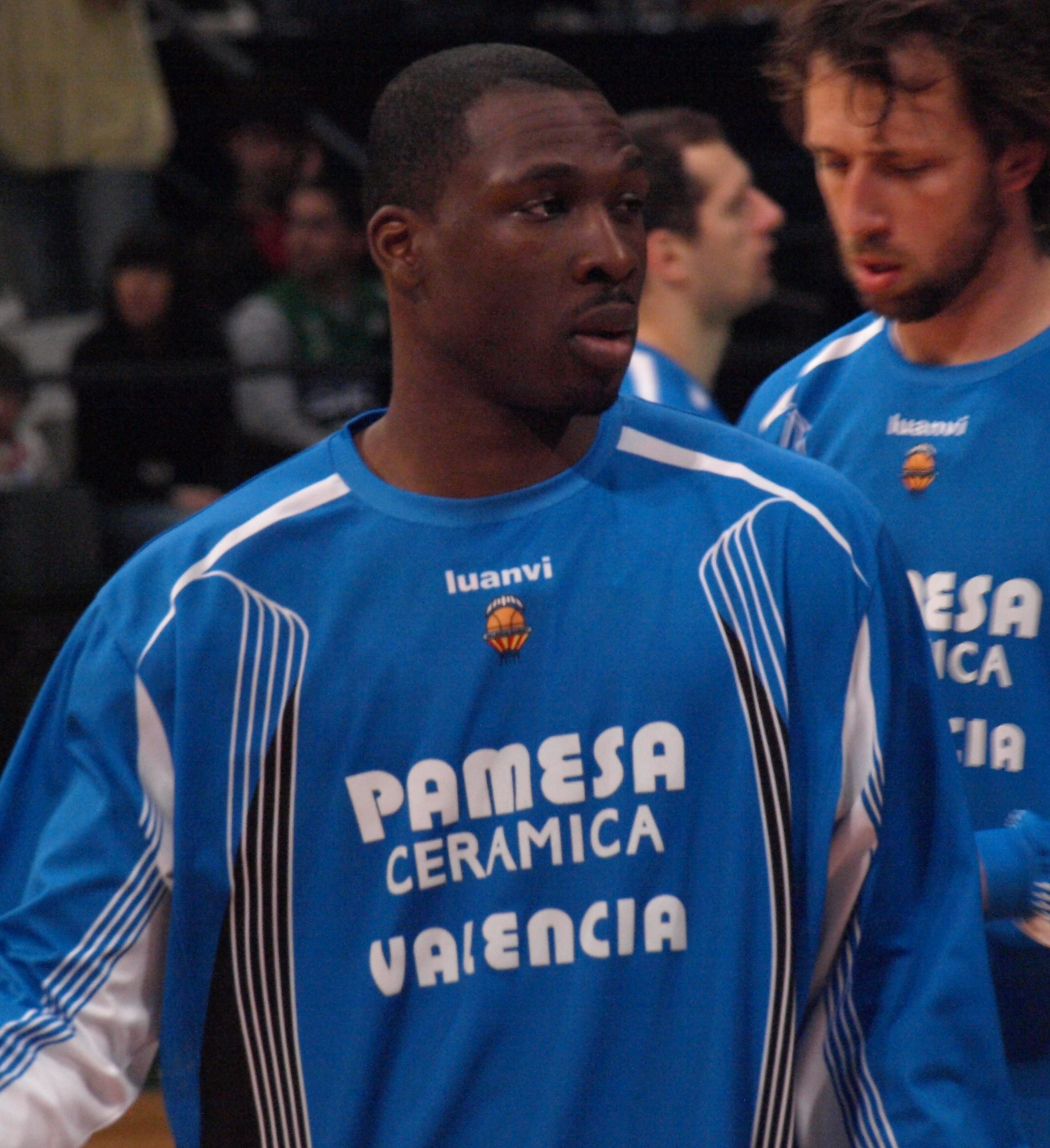
- Piétrus with Valencia, in 2009.

LDLC ASVEL
- Title: Assistant general manager
- League: LNB Élite; EuroLeague

Personal information
- Born: 19 January 1981 (age 45) Les Abymes, Guadeloupe
- Listed height: 6 ft 7 1/2 in (2.02 m)
- Listed weight: 235 lb (107 kg)

Career information
- NBA draft: 2003: undrafted
- Playing career: 1999–2020
- Position: Power forward

Career history
- 1999–2004: Élan Béarnais Pau-Orthez
- 2004–2007: Unicaja Málaga
- 2007–2008: Estudiantes
- 2008–2010: Valencia
- 2010: Caja Laboral
- 2010–2013: Valencia
- 2013–2016: SLUC Nancy
- 2016–2017: BCM Gravelines
- 2017: Levallois Metropolitans
- 2018–2020: SIG Strasbourg
- 2020: Orléans Loiret Basket

Career highlights
- Leaders Cup winner (2019); EuroCup champion (2010); 3× Pro A champion (2001, 2003, 2004); Spanish League champion (2006); 3× French Cup winner (2002, 2003, 2018); Spanish Cup winner (2005); 2x Pro A Best Defender (2002, 2015)
Medals
Men's basketball
Representing France
FIBA Basketball World Cup
Bronze medal – third place	2014 Spain
EuroBasket
Gold medal – first place	2013 Slovenia
Silver medal – second place	2011 Lithuania
Bronze medal – third place	2005 Serbia and Montenegro
Bronze medal – third place	2015 France–Croatia–Germany–Latvia

Florent Marius Piétrus (born 19 January 1981) is a French former professional basketball player and executive who is currently the assistant general manager for LDLC ASVEL of the French LNB Élite and the EuroLeague. His younger brother, Mickaël Piétrus, played in the National Basketball Association (NBA).

== Professional career ==
Piétrus began his career with the French League club Élan Béarnais Pau-Orthez (1999–04). He went undrafted in the 2003 NBA draft. Since then, he has played in the Spanish League with Unicaja Málaga (2004–07), MMT Estudiantes (2007–08), Valencia (2008–10), Caja Laboral (2010), and again with Valencia (2010–13).

On 22 July 2013 Piétrus signed with the French club SLUC Nancy Basket. He joined the French club BCM Gravelines in 2016. On 1 September 2017 Piétrus signed a short-term deal with Levallois Metropolitans. On 3 February 2018 he signed with Strasbourg IG for the rest of the season. On 9 July 2018 Piétrus signed a one-year contract extension with Strasbourg IG.

On 12 January 2020 he signed with Orléans Loiret Basket of the LNB Pro A.

== National team career ==
In September 2005, Piétrus won the bronze medal at the EuroBasket 2005 with the senior French National Team. He also won the silver medal at the EuroBasket 2011, the gold medal at the EuroBasket 2013, and the bronze medal at the EuroBasket 2015. He also played at EuroBasket 2003, EuroBasket 2007, and EuroBasket 2009.

Piétrus also played with France at the 2006 FIBA World Championship, at the 2010 FIBA World Championship in Turkey, at the 2012 Summer Olympics, at the 2014 FIBA World Cup, where he won a bronze medal, and at the 2016 Summer Olympics.

=== French national team stats ===
Tournament	Games played	Points per game	Rebounds per game	Assists per game
EuroBasket 2003	6	6.8	5.3	0.7
EuroBasket 2005	7	7.6	7.1	0.7
2006 World Championship	9	9.7	6.7	0.6
EuroBasket 2007	7	8.9	3.7	0.6
EuroBasket 2009	8	6.5	2.9	1.1
2010 World Championship	4	4.5	4.8	1.5
EuroBasket 2011	11	2.6	3.4	0.8
2012 Summer Olympics	6	4.5	2.8	0.5
EuroBasket 2013	11	1.9	3.5	0.2
2014 World Cup	9	3.1	3.7	0.9
EuroBasket 2015	9	1.2	2.9	0.2
2016 Summer Olympics	11	0.8	0.7	0.7

== Personal life ==
Piétrus is the older brother of Mickaël Piétrus, who played in the NBA. His son Illan is also a basketball player.
