= Sheldon Richardson =

American football player (born 1990)

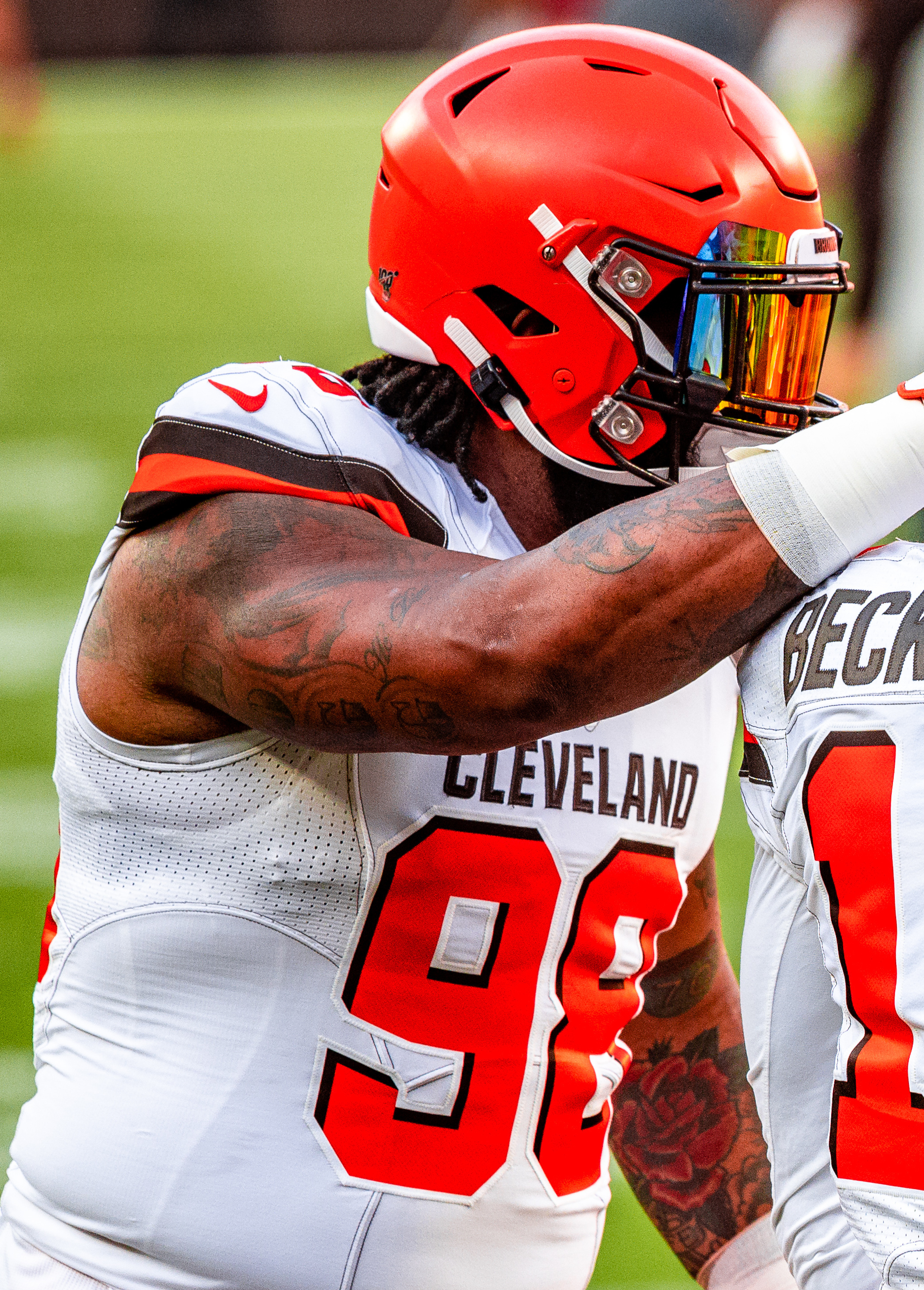
- Richardson with the Cleveland Browns in 2019

No. 91, 93, 98, 90
- Position: Defensive tackle

Personal information
- Born: November 29, 1990 (age 35); St. Louis, Missouri, U.S.
- Listed height: 6 ft 3 in (1.91 m)
- Listed weight: 290 lb (132 kg)

Career information
- High school: Gateway Tech (St. Louis)
- College: Missouri (2011–2012)
- NFL draft: 2013: 1st round, 13th overall pick

Career history
- New York Jets (2013–2016); Seattle Seahawks (2017); Minnesota Vikings (2018); Cleveland Browns (2019–2020); Minnesota Vikings (2021)

Awards and highlights
- NFL Defensive Rookie of the Year (2013); Pro Bowl (2014); PFWA All-Rookie Team (2013); First-team All-SEC (2012)

Career NFL statistics
- Total tackles: 500
- Sacks: 33.5
- Forced fumbles: 11
- Fumble recoveries: 6
- Interceptions: 1
- Pass deflections: 18
- Total touchdowns: 2
- Stats at Pro Football Reference

Sheldon Adam Richardson (born November 29, 1990) is an American former professional football player who was a defensive tackle in the National Football League (NFL). He played college football for the Missouri Tigers, and was selected by the New York Jets in the first round of the 2013 NFL draft. Richardson has also played for the Seattle Seahawks, Cleveland Browns and Minnesota Vikings twice.

== Early life ==
Richardson was born in St. Louis, Missouri on November 29, 1990, the son to Michael and Zelda (née Robinson) Richardson. He attended Gateway Institute of Technology High School in St. Louis, where he played for the Gateway Jaguars high school football team. He recorded 88 tackles and 19 quarterback sacks while adding seven fumble recoveries, five forced fumbles, and one interception. He also scored six defensive touchdowns on the year, as well, while adding 27 receptions for 541 yards and eight touchdowns at the tight end position. Richardson also lettered in baseball, basketball, and track at Gateway.

Following his senior season, USA Today recognized Richardson as a high school All-American. He was considered the No. 1 defensive tackle, and No. 4 best player overall, in the nation by recruit rating service Rivals.com.

College recruiting
Name	Hometown	School	Height	Weight	40^{‡}	Commit date
Sheldon Richardson; Defensive tackle	St. Louis, Missouri	Gateway High School	6 ft 4 in (1.93 m)	292 lb (132 kg)	4.72	Jun 12, 2007
Sheldon Richardson; Defensive tackle	Recruit ratings: Scout: Rivals:					
Overall recruit ranking: Scout: 4 (DT) Rivals: 4 (DE), 1 (MO)
‡ Refers to 40-yard dash; Note: In many cases, Scout, Rivals, 247Sports, On3, and ESPN may conflict in their listings of height, weight and 40 time.; In these cases, the average was taken. ESPN grades are on a 100-point scale.; Sources: "Missouri Football Commitments". Rivals.; "2009 Missouri Football Recruiting Commits". Scout.; "Scout.com Team Recruiting Rankings". Scout.; "2009 Team Ranking". Rivals.com.

== College career ==
Richardson attended the College of the Sequoias in Visalia, California for two years. After his sophomore year, he transferred to the University of Missouri, where he played for coach Gary Pinkel's Missouri Tigers football team in 2011 and 2012. He announced on November 30, 2012, that he would enter the NFL draft instead of finishing his senior year as a Missouri Tiger. He finished the season tied for second on the team with 75 tackles, a figure that led all defensive tackles in the Southeastern Conference. He also had 10.5 tackles for loss, four quarterback sacks, seven quarterback hurries, and three forced fumbles.

== Professional career ==
=== Pre-draft ===
Coming out of Missouri, Richardson was a projected first round pick by NFL draft experts and scouts. He received an invitation to the NFL combine and nearly completed all of the required combine drills, but was unable to perform the short shuttle and three-cone drill due to a hip injury. On March 7, 2013, he participated at Missouri's pro day and opted to perform the short shuttle and three-cone drill, as well as positional drills. 20 team representatives and scouts from 17 NFL teams attended to scout Richardson, Zaviar Gooden, T. J. Moe, Kendial Lawrence, Kip Edwards, and seven other players. During the pre-draft process, Richardson cited the Kansas City Chiefs, Miami Dolphins, Oakland Raiders, Jacksonville Jaguars, and Seattle Seahawks as the teams who expressed the most interest. He also had a private meeting with the Cleveland Browns. He was ranked as the second best defensive tackle in the draft by NFL analyst Mike Mayock and was ranked as the third best defensive tackle by NFLDraftScout.com.

Pre-draft measurables
Height	Weight	Arm length	Hand span	40-yard dash	10-yard split	20-yard split	20-yard shuttle	Three-cone drill	Vertical jump	Broad jump	Bench press
6 ft 2 1/2 in (1.89 m)	294 lb (133 kg)	34 1/2 in (0.88 m)	10 1/2 in (0.27 m)	5.02 s	1.75 s	2.91 s	4.59 s	7.33 s	32 in (0.81 m)	9 ft 8 in (2.95 m)	30 reps
All values from NFL Combine/Missouri's pro day

=== New York Jets ===
==== 2013 ====
The New York Jets selected Richardson in the first round (13th overall) of the 2013 NFL draft. He was the first defensive tackle to be selected in the draft. The pick was originally acquired from the Tampa Bay Buccaneers in a trade that sent Darrelle Revis to Tampa Bay.

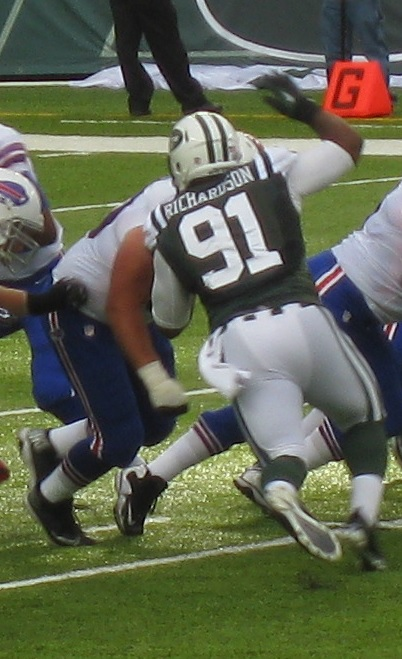
Richardson playing against the Buffalo Bills in his rookie season.

On July 25, 2013, the Jets signed Richardson to a four-year, $10.05 million contract that was fully guaranteed and included a signing bonus of $5.69 million.

He was named the starting defensive end in the 2013 season. During November, Richardson won the NFL Rookie of the Month award, becoming the first Jets player to do so since Mark Sanchez in 2009. The Jets used Richardson as a fullback in six plays during the 2013 season in games against the Atlanta Falcons, the Buffalo Bills, the Carolina Panthers, and the Miami Dolphins. In a week 15 game against the Panthers, Richardson became the first NFL defensive lineman to score a rushing touchdown since B. J. Raji did so for the Green Bay Packers in 2011. He ran for his second career touchdown of the season in the Jets' week 17 finale against Miami. Richardson played 16 games (started 15) in 2013 making 78 tackles, a pass defended, a forced fumble, 3.5 sacks, and 2 rushing touchdowns. On February 2, 2014, it was announced that Richardson had won the 2013 NFL Defensive Rookie of the Year award, edging out Buffalo Bills linebacker Kiko Alonso by a margin of 23 votes to 19. He was named to the PFWA All-Rookie Team.

==== 2014 ====
On September 20, 2014, Richardson was fined $8,268 for his role in an endzone fracas during Week 2 against the Green Bay Packers. During the 2014 year, Richardson started all 16 games making 66 tackles, 8 sacks, 1 pass defended, 1 forced fumble, and 1 safety enforced. For his efforts, he was a Pro Bowl selection for the first time in his career.

==== 2015 ====
On July 2, 2015, Richardson was suspended for the first four games of the 2015 regular season due to failing the league's substance abuse policy related to marijuana. He was activated by the team on October 12, 2015.

On October 15, 2015, Richardson played in his first game of the season and recorded three combined tackles, and was credited with half a sack on Washington Redskins' quarterback Kirk Cousins in a 34–20 victory.

Playing 11 games in 2015, Richardson finished the year with 35 tackles, 5 sacks, 2 passes defended, and 2 forced fumbles.

==== 2016 ====
On April 18, 2016, the Jets picked up Richardson's fifth-year option on his rookie contract that was worth $8.06 million for 2017 and fully guaranteed. On June 30, he was suspended one game for violating the off-the-field personal conduct policy regarding his arrest the previous year (see personal life).

After serving his one-game suspension during the New York Jets' season-opener, he made his season debut the following week against the Buffalo Bills and recorded four solo tackles during the 37–31 victory. On September 25, 2016, Richardson recorded five combined tackles and was credited with half a sack on Alex Smith, as the Jets were defeated by the Kansas City Chiefs 3-24. During a Week 6 matchup against the Arizona Cardinals, he collected a season-high seven solo tackles in a 3–28 loss. The following game, he earned six combined tackles and made his only solo sack of the season on Baltimore Raven' quarterback Joe Flacco in a 24–16 victory. Overall, he had 15 starts in 15 games and finished with a total of 62 combined tackles (38 solo), 1.5 sacks, two passes defended, and a forced fumble. He played 618 snaps (84%) at defensive lineman and 87 snaps (12%) at linebacker.

Throughout the season, the New York Jets fielded offers to trade Richardson and made multiple attempts. During the week of the 2017 NFL draft they had discussions with many teams that included the Washington Redskins and Dallas Cowboys about trading him. Before the beginning of the 2017 season, the New York Jets fielded offers from the Dallas Cowboys, Denver Broncos, and Seattle Seahawks. Richardson cited that the Redskins and Seahawks were interested but wanted him to take a pay cut, which he refused.

=== Seattle Seahawks ===
On September 1, 2017, Richardson was traded to the Seattle Seahawks for Jermaine Kearse and a 2018 second-round draft pick.

Upon arrival, he was switched positions from defensive end to defensive tackle. Head coach Pete Carroll named Richardson a starting defensive tackle along with Jarran Reed. Upon a season-ending neck injury to defensive end Cliff Avril, the starting defensive line for the remainder of the season consisted of Richardson and Reed on the interior, with Frank Clark and Michael Bennett anchoring the defensive end positions.

He made his Seattle Seahawks debut in their season-opening 9–17 loss to the Green Bay Packers and recorded four solo tackles. On October 8, 2017, Richardson intercepted a pass attempt from Los Angeles Rams' quarterback Jared Goff and also returned a fumble recovery for 20-yards during a 16–10 victory. During Week 13 against the Philadelphia Eagles, Richardson forced a fumble on the Eagles quarterback Carson Wentz at the Seahawks' 1-yard-line, preventing an Eagles touchdown and turning it into a touchback for Seattle instead. During Week 14 against the Jacksonville Jaguars, Richardson was ejected for the first time in his NFL career after being involved in a brawl that occurred during the closing seconds of the fourth quarter.

On the season he had 15 starts in 15 games and finished with a total of 44 combined tackles (27 solo), 1 sack, 1 pass defended, 1 interception, and a forced fumble.

=== Minnesota Vikings (first stint) ===
On March 16, 2018, Richardson signed a one-year contract with the Minnesota Vikings. He started all 16 games, recording 49 combined tackles and 4.5 sacks.

=== Cleveland Browns ===
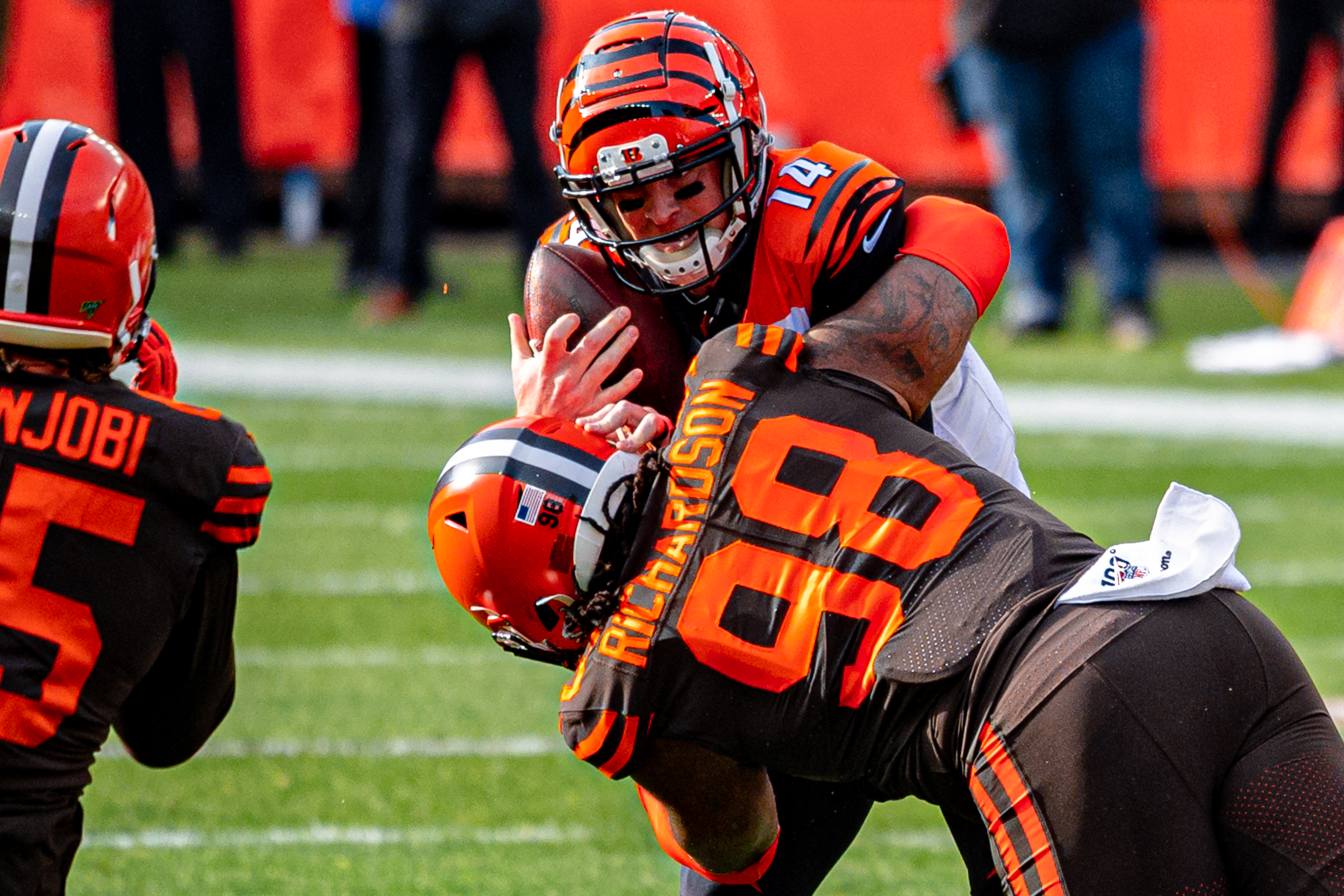
Richardson sacking Bengals quarterback, Andy Dalton, in 2019.

On March 14, 2019, the Cleveland Browns signed Richardson to a three-year, $36 million contract, with $21 million guaranteed. In week 12 against the Miami Dolphins, Richardson recorded his first two sacks of the season on Ryan Fitzpatrick in the 41–24 win.

In Week 2 of the 2020 season against the Cincinnati Bengals on Thursday Night Football, Richardson recorded his first sack of the season on Joe Burrow during the 35–30 win.

On April 16, 2021, Richardson was released from the Browns.

=== Minnesota Vikings (second stint) ===
On June 15, 2021, Richardson returned to the Vikings on a one-year, $3.6 million contract.

== NFL career statistics ==
Year	Team	Games		Tackles					Interceptions						Fumbles	
Year	Team	GP	GS	Cmb	Solo	Ast	Sck	SFTY	PD	Int	Yds	Avg	Lng	TD	FF	FR
2013	NYJ	16	15	78	42	36	3.5	–	1	–	–	0.0	–	–	1	0
2014	NYJ	16	16	67	42	25	8.0	1	1	–	–	0.0	–	–	1	1
2015	NYJ	11	11	35	20	15	5.0	–	2	–	–	0.0	–	–	2	0
2016	NYJ	15	14	62	38	24	1.5	–	2	–	–	0.0	–	–	1	2
2017	SEA	15	15	44	27	17	1.0	–	1	1	5	5.0	5	0	1	2
2018	MIN	16	16	49	26	23	4.5	–	0	–	–	0.0	–	–	0	0
2019	CLE	16	15	62	43	19	3.0	–	4	–	–	0.0	–	–	3	0
2020	CLE	15	15	64	34	30	4.5	–	3	–	–	0.0	–	–	1	0
2021	MIN	17	7	39	24	15	2.5	–	4	–	–	0.0	–	–	1	1
Total		138	121	500	297	203	33.5	1	18	1	5	5.0	5	0	11	6

=== Career awards and highlights ===
- Pro Bowl selection (2014)
- AP NFL Defensive Rookie of the Year (2013)
- NFL Defensive Rookie of the Month (November 2013)
- PFWA NFL All-Rookie Team (2013)
- Pro Football Focus All-Rookie Team (2013)
- 2× NFL Top 100 — 94th (2014), 55th (2015),

== Personal life ==
On July 14, 2015, less than two weeks after receiving his suspension for failing the league's substance abuse policy, Richardson was arrested in St. Charles County, Missouri and charged with resisting arrest and traffic violations. He was reportedly street racing in excess of 140 miles per hour before attempting to evade the authorities pursuing him. Two other men and a 12-year-old were found to be in the car, all of whom smelled of marijuana. A loaded handgun was found beneath the driver's seat. He was not charged with any drug charges or child endangerment since according to the prosecutor, there was not enough evidence for a case that was beyond a reasonable doubt. There was no gun charge since guns are legal in Missouri and Richardson was in proper possession of them.

On January 26, 2016, he was found guilty of reckless driving and resisting arrest. He was fined $1,050, received 2 years of probation, and was ordered to undergo 100 hours of community service.
