= 2013–14 Pro A season =

2013–14 Pro A
- Season: 2013–14
- Duration: 4 October 2013 – 12 May 2014
- Games played: 30
- Teams: 16
- TV partners: Sport+, Canal+ Sport

Regular season
- Top seed: Strasbourg IG
- Season MVP: (France) Antoine Diot (United States) Randal Falker
- Relegated: Antibes Sharks; Chorale Roanne

Finals
- Champions: Limoges CSP; 10th title
- Runners-up: Strasbourg IG
- Semifinalists: SLUC Nancy; JDA Dijon
- Finals MVP: (Italy) Alex Acker

Awards
- Coach o/t Year: (France) Jean-Louis Borg
- Best Young Player: (Switzerland) Clint Capela
- Most Improved: (Switzerland) Clint Capela
- Best Defender: (United States) Anthony Dobbins

Statistical leaders
Points	(France) Edwin Jackson	18.0
Rebounds	(United States) Randal Falker	9.4
Assists	(France) Andrew Albicy	6.8
- All statistics correct as of 11 September 2014.

The 2013–14 LNB Pro A season was the 92nd season of the French Basketball Championship and the 27th season since inception of the Ligue Nationale de Basketball (LNB).

The regular season started on October 4, 2013 and ended on May 5, 2014. The Playoffs started on May 12. Limoges CSP won their 10th French title and their first since 2000. Strasbourg IG was runner-up.

== Teams ==
Location of teams in Pro A League 2011–12

Team	Home city	Stadium	Capacity
Antibes	Antibes	Salle Salusse-Santoni	1,300
Élan sportif chalonnais	Chalon-sur-Saône	Le Colisée	5,000
Cholet Basket	Cholet	La Meilleraie	5,191
JDA Dijon	Dijon	Palais des Sports Jean-Michel Geoffroy	5,000
BCM Gravelines Dunkerque	Gravelines	Sportica	3,500
STB Le Havre	Le Havre	Salle des Docks Océane	3,598
Le Mans Sarthe Basket	Le Mans	Antarès	6,003
Limoges Cercle Saint-Pierre	Limoges	Beaublanc	6,000
ASVEL Basket	Lyon – Villeurbanne	Astroballe	5,643
SLUC Nancy Basket	Nancy	Palais des Sports Jean Weille	6,027
JSF Nanterre	Nanterre	Palais des Sports de Nanterre	3,000
Orléans Loiret Basket	Orléans	Zénith d'Orléans	5,338
Paris-Levallois Basket	Paris – Levallois	Stade Pierre de Coubertin; Palais des Sports Marcel Cerdan	4,200; 4,000
Élan Béarnais Pau-Orthez	Pau	Palais des Sports de Pau	7,707
Chorale Roanne Basket	Roanne	Halle André Vacheresse	5,020
Strasbourg IG	Strasbourg	Rhénus Sport	6,200

== Regular season ==
Pos	Teams	GP	W	L	PF	PA	Qualification or relegation
1	Strasbourg	30	20	10	2363	2231	Playoffs
2	Limoges	30	20	10	2317	2252	Playoffs
3	Le Mans	30	19	11	2168	2122	Playoffs
4	Nancy	30	18	12	2297	2178	Playoffs
5	Paris-Levallois	30	18	12	2295	2219	Playoffs
6	Dijon	30	18	12	2131	2103	Playoffs
7	Lyon-Villeurbanne	30	17	13	2285	2152	Playoffs
8	Chalon-sur-Saône	30	17	13	2484	2342	Playoffs
9	Nanterre	30	16	14	2319	2275	
10	Orléans	30	16	14	2257	2246	
11	Pau-Orthez	30	15	15	2297	2345	
12	Gravelines-Dunkerque	30	13	16	2220	2231	
13	Cholet	30	12	18	2291	2404	
14	Le Havre	30	9	21	2238	2365	
15	Roanne	30	6	24	2049	2252	Relegation to Pro B
16	Antibes	30	6	24	2104	2398	Relegation to Pro B

== Playoffs ==
Quarterfinals
1	Strasbourg	2
8	Chalon-sur-Saône	1
4	Nancy	2
5	Paris-Levallois	1
2	Limoges	2
7	Lyon-Villeurbanne	0
3	Le Mans	0
6	Dijon	2

Semifinals
1	Strasbourg	3
4	Nancy	2
2	Limoges	3
6	Dijon	2

Finals
1	Strasbourg	0
2	Limoges	3

== Statistics leaders ==
=== Individual leaders ===
Category	Player	Team	Statistics
Points per game	(France) Edwin Jackson	ASVEL	18.0
Rebounds per game	(United States) Randal Falker	SLUC Nancy	8.0
Assists per game	(France) Andrew Albicy	BCM Gravelines	6.8
Steals per game	(France) Andrew Albicy	BCM Gravelines	2.2
Blocks per game	(United States) Randal Falker	SLUC Nancy	2.1
Turnovers per game	(United States) Mykal Riley	JDA Dijon	2.8
Minutes per game	(United States) Andre Harris	JDA Dijon	35.1
FG%	(France) Bangaly Fofana	STB Le Havre	62.8%
FT%	(France) Nicolas Lang	Paris-Levallois	95.0%
3FG%	(United States) Darnell Harris	Orléans Loiret	48.2%

=== Individual game highs ===
Category	Player	Statistics
Points	(France) Edwin Jackson	44
Rebounds	(France) Sarra Camara	19
Rebounds	(United States) Randal Falker	19
Assists	(United States) Dashaun Wood	15
Steals	(United States) D. J. Strawberry	8
Blocks	(Switzerland) Clint Capela	6
Three Pointers	(Bulgaria) Ilian Evtimov	7
Three Pointers	(United States) Cedrick Banks	7

== Awards ==
French MVP

- (France) Antoine Diot (Strasbourg IG)

Foreign MVP

- (United States) Randal Falker (SLUC Nancy)

Top scorer

- (France) Edwin Jackson (ASVEL Basket)

Best Young Player

- (Switzerland) Clint Capela (Élan Chalon)

Best Defender

- (Italy) Tony Dobbins (JDA Dijon)

Most Improved Player

- (Switzerland) Clint Capela (Élan Chalon)

Finals MVP

- (Italy) Alex Acker (CSP Limoges)

Best Coach

- (France) Jean-Louis Borg (JDA Dijon)
