= Gateway STEM High School =

American magnet high school in St. Louis

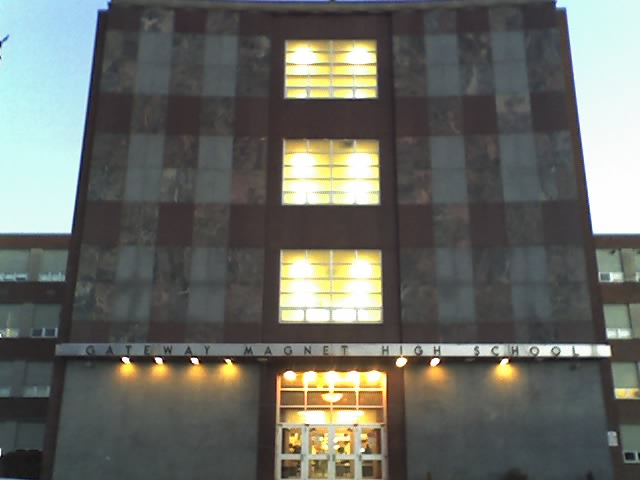
- Entrance to Gateway STEM High School

Location
- 5101 McRee Avenue; St. Louis, Missouri 63110; United States; 38.621°N 90.269°W

Information
- Former name: Gateway Institute of Technology (1992–2012)
- Type: Magnet high school
- Established: August 1992; 34 years ago
- School district: St. Louis Public Schools
- Superintendent: Millicent Borishade (Interim)
- Principal: June Berry
- Staff: 72.40 (on an FTE basis)
- Grades: 9–12
- Enrollment: 825 (2022–23)
- Student to teacher ratio: 11.40
- Campus type: Urban
- Colors: Blue and black
- Athletics conference: Public High League
- Nickname: Jaguars
- Website: stem.slps.org

Gateway STEM High School, formerly known as Gateway Institute of Technology, is a public magnet high school focused on STEM education in the Hill neighborhood in St. Louis, Missouri, United States.

== History ==
Gateway opened as John O'Fallon Technical High School in 1956, named in honor of John O'Fallon. Under its former name it opened in August 1992, in response to a court order mandating the establishment of a high technology magnet school. The school integrates a strong academic curriculum emphasizing mathematics and science with career preparation in highly technical fields. Accelerated and advanced placement courses are available for students. Inquiry, innovation, creativity and exploration are encouraged throughout the school. In June 2012 The School was renamed as Gateway STEM High School or Gateway Science Technology Engineering and Mathematics High School.

Gateway was one of ten schools recognized as a New American High School by the United States Department of Education in 1996. Gateway serves as a model school and is visited regularly by educators from the U.S. and elsewhere. The school also has the long time Music and Band instructor Steven Hill who has been at the school since its opening in 1992.

== Student body ==
The school has 970 students, who are accepted on a lottery basis. Approximately 200 of the students have disabilities, including severe orthopedic disabilities, learning disabilities, and behavior challenges. Gateway accepts gifted students.

== Academics ==
At the ninth and tenth grade level students are in 'houses' of 85 to 100 students supported by four teachers (covering English, social studies, math, and science, respectively) and a counselor. The school is designed to integrate academic and technological education in career clusters that require students to have a strong background in mathematics and science. All the students take a broad mathematics curriculum, biology, chemistry, and physics.

Going into their junior year, students pick a career strand, or 'major', within one of several specialty areas:

- Agricultural, Biological, and Health Sciences.
- Applied Physical Sciences.
- Computer Science and Mathematics.
- Engineering Technology, which can include an Aviation Maintenance Program that lasts five years and is certified by the Federal Aviation Administration.
- Public Safety- Gateway is also home to SLPS Public Safety Academy. Students choose between Law Enforcement, Fire, and EMS. They have a fully operational Fire Truck and Ambulance and respond to medical calls in the building operating as an Emergency Medical Response Agency under the direction of a licensed paramedic and board certified medical director. Students completing the Fire program are eligible to test for Missouri Fire 1 & 2 and become certified firefighters. Students completing the EMT program are eligible to test for NREMT certification allowing state licensure in Missouri.

== Partnerships with businesses ==
The school has partnerships with local businesses. Monsanto Company and two medical schools in St. Louis provide assistance and internships in the area of agricultural, health and biological sciences; Mallinckrodt Chemical, in physical sciences; McDonnell-Douglas, in engineering technology; and Lucent Technologies Bell Labs, as well as the computer divisions of Monsanto, Mallinckrodt Chemical, and McDonnell-Douglas, in computer science and mathematics. Lucent Technologies staff also help the students. Abbott EMS offers second semester internships to seniors who have completed the EMT program and are eligible to test for the NREMT certification.

== Notable alumni ==
- Sheldon Richardson - Minnesota Vikings (defensive tackle).
- Sam Scarber - San Diego Chargers (running back)
