= 2014–15 Pro A season =

2014–15 Pro A
- Season: 2014–15
- Duration: September 26, 2014 – June 20, 2015
- Games played: 34
- Teams: 18
- TV partners: Sport+, Canal+ Sport

Regular season
- Top seed: SIG Strasbourg
- Season MVP: (France) Adrien Moerman
- Relegated: SOMB Boulogne-sur-Mer; JL Bourg-en-Bresse

Finals
- Champions: Limoges (11th title)
- Runners-up: SIG Strasbourg
- Finals MVP: (France) Ousmane Camara

Statistical leaders
Points	(United States) Steven Gray	16.8
Rebounds	(Saint Vincent and the Grenadines) Shawn King	9.8
Assists	(United States) Mike Green	7.2
- All statistics correct as of 28 April 2015.

The 2014–15 LNB Pro A season was the 93rd season of the French Basketball Championship and the 28th season since inception of the LNB.

The season started on September 26, 2014, and ended on June 20, 2015.

This season the number of teams was increased to 18, after SOMB Boulogne-sur-Mer and JL Bourg-en-Bresse promoted from the LNB Pro B and Champagne Châlons Reims Basket and SPO Rouen Basket were offered spots through a wild card.

== Teams ==
=== Promotion and relegation ===
- Relegated to Pro B
  - Chorale Roanne Basket (15th)
  - Antibes (16th)
- Promoted from Pro B
  - SOMB Boulogne-sur-Mer (Champion)
  - JL Bourg-en-Bresse (Playoffs winner)
- Wild-cards offered by LNB
  - Champagne Châlons Reims
  - SPO Rouen Basket

=== Venues and locations ===
Location of teams in Pro A League 2014–15

Team	Home city	Stadium	Capacity
SOMB Boulogne-sur-Mer	Boulogne-sur-Mer	Salle Damrémont	2,000
JL Bourg-en-Bresse	Bourg-en-Bresse	Ekinox	3,548
Champagne Châlons Reims	Reims	Complexe René-Tys	2,926
SPO Rouen Basket	Rouen	Kindarena	6,000
Élan Chalon	Chalon-sur-Saône	Le Colisée	5,000
Cholet Basket	Cholet	La Meilleraie	5,191
JDA Dijon	Dijon	Palais des Sports Jean-Michel Geoffroy	5,000
BCM Gravelines Dunkerque	Gravelines	Sportica	3,500
STB Le Havre	Le Havre	Salle des Docks Océane	3,598
Le Mans Sarthe Basket	Le Mans	Antarès	6,003
Limoges Cercle Saint-Pierre	Limoges	Beaublanc	6,000
ASVEL Basket	Lyon – Villeurbanne	Astroballe	5,556
SLUC Nancy Basket	Nancy	Palais des Sports Jean Weille	6,027
JSF Nanterre	Nanterre	Palais des Sports de Nanterre	3,000
Orléans Loiret Basket	Orléans	Zénith d'Orléans	5,338
Paris-Levallois Basket	Paris – Levallois	Stade Pierre de Coubertin; Palais des Sports Marcel Cerdan	4,200; 4,000
Élan Béarnais Pau-Orthez	Pau	Palais des Sports de Pau	7,707
Strasbourg IG	Strasbourg	Rhénus Sport	6,200

== Managerial changes ==
=== Before the start of the season ===
Team	Outgoing manager	Manner of departure	Date of vacancy	Replaced by	Date of appointment
SPO Rouen Basket	(France) Laurent Sciarra	Sacked	13 June 2014	(France) Christophe Denis	13 June 2014
Le Mans Sarthe Basket	(Canada) JD Jackson	End of contract	30 June 2014	(Turkey) (France) Erman Kunter	1 July 2014
Orléans Loiret Basket	(France) Philippe Hervé	End of contract	30 June 2014	(France) François Péronnet	1 July 2014

== Regular season ==
=== League table ===
Pos	Team	Pld	W	L	PF	PA	PR	Qualification or relegation
1	SIG Strasbourg	34	30	4	2592	2230	1.162	Advance to playoffs
2	Nanterre	34	25	9	2797	2517	1.111	Advance to playoffs
3	Limoges	34	22	12	2766	2593	1.067	Advance to playoffs
4	Le Mans Sarthe	34	19	15	2553	2537	1.006	Advance to playoffs
5	ASVEL	34	19	15	2536	2465	1.029	Advance to playoffs
6	STB Le Havre	34	19	15	2585	2568	1.007	Advance to playoffs
7	SLUC Nancy	34	18	16	2608	2565	1.017	Advance to playoffs
8	Élan Chalon	34	18	16	2618	2575	1.017	Advance to playoffs
9	BCM Gravelines-Dunkerque	34	18	16	2533	2441	1.038	
10	JDA Dijon	34	17	17	2584	2595	0.996	
11	Paris Levallois	34	17	17	2611	2551	1.024	
12	Champagne Châlons-Reims	34	17	17	2712	2702	1.004	
13	Élan Béarnais Pau-Lacq-Orthez	34	13	21	2539	2648	0.959	
14	Cholet	34	13	21	2661	2770	0.961	
15	SPO Rouen	34	12	22	2544	2718	0.936	
16	Entente Orléanaise	34	10	24	2535	2751	0.921	
17	JL Bourg	34	9	25	2635	2851	0.924	Relegation to Pro B
18	SOMB	34	9	25	2632	2964	0.888	Relegation to Pro B

Source: LNB

=== Results ===
Home \ Away	ASV	BSM	BEB	CHS	CHR	CHO	DIJ	GRA	HAV	MSB	LIM	NCY	NTR	ORL	PAR	PAU	ROU	SIG
ASVEL Basket		89–65	86–64	56–64	89–75	67–56	79–67	79–56	54–65	80–67	74–83	69–67	65–88	64–60	77–71	84–59	74–79	75–90
SOMB Boulogne-sur-Mer	90–99		80–79	66–61	80–84	103–79	86–70	64–79	102–103	57–74	85–96	82–89	74–95	86–92	66–95	79–73	61–66	70–93
JL Bourg-en-Bresse	65–95	94–80		99–88	62–81	90–80	96–101	71–78	73–81	65–87	67–99	83–68	83–99	75–98	76–84	88–67	87–72	82–86
Élan Chalon	79–80	100–78	73–80		89–84	95–88	66–76	52–57	80–78	73–88	81–72	81–64	96–72	85–69	70–64	84–72	94–82	52–56
Châlons-Reims	88–71	87–91	85–87	84–80		88–70	86–80	85–84	84–96	74–83	103–92	69–76	80–83	69–49	84–85	85–75	70–76	69–73
Cholet Basket	75–73	115–90	91–77	79–81	77–80		81–73	74–73	79–84	83–85	66–78	87–84	77–88	89–67	78–85	78–79	80–75	52–67
JDA Dijon Basket	86–71	81–78	117–113	68–71	78–57	68–70		68–62	72–67	80–79	63–76	73–87	100–105	81–73	77–58	64–76	90–81	70–74
BCM Gravelines	61–50	66–80	68–62	65–74	75–66	90–71	73–53		69–78	69–63	78–81	66–71	92–84	83–61	87–68	95–86	92–49	62–76
STB Le Havre	73–85	116–77	77–76	79–70	80–76	76–81	83–63	62–78		71–85	85–79	72–78	79–105	79–66	73–87	69–61	71–63	59–72
Le Mans Sarthe Basket	92–76	68–61	96–83	68–66	79–88	61–82	63–80	78–73	70–56		59–74	74–70	63–81	82–89	73–67	83–78	61–63	76–83
Limoges CSP	79–81	83–88	79–70	78–63	77–65	83–73	78–67	87–83	84–77	89–83		75–56	72–90	102–66	73–65	96–89	92–62	68–87
SLUC Nancy Basket	72–66	105–74	94–68	74–59	72–77	98–94	64–73	67–61	78–84	71–74	101–107		70–79	73–64	64–74	75–83	96–83	65–78
JSF Nanterre	76–65	84–70	84–62	89–66	106–88	84–71	61–73	74–68	61–68	73–61	72–75	77–84		94–81	60–71	82–46	101–89	73–69
Orléans Loiret Basket	72–78	79–86	76–74	98–80	77–64	72–79	79–62	88–73	73–71	81–86	91–85	71–80	73–89		68–88	75–89	83–87	60–82
Paris-Levallois Basket	64–60	86–69	80–76	84–94	87–66	89–96	75–87	99–107	81–59	74–65	92–66	64–77	80–76	76–77		70–71	83–73	68–83
Élan Béarnais Pau-Orthez	67–78	90–59	77–64	73–90	83–91	92–81	80–77	67–69	75–84	85–91	79–69	76–79	77–91	72–60	70–59		83–55	58–86
Rouen Métropole Basket	82–89	98–84	68–81	70–77	84–97	98–66	84–90	76–83	68–76	75–68	76–74	66–67	60–69	88–86	64–58	88–69		76–89
Strasbourg IG	68–58	93–71	76–63	85–84	56–63	77–63	63–56	77–58	63–54	67–68	56–65	82–72	69–49	80–61	89–80	70–62	77–68	

Legend: Blue = home team win; Yellow = draw; Red = away team win.

== Playoffs ==
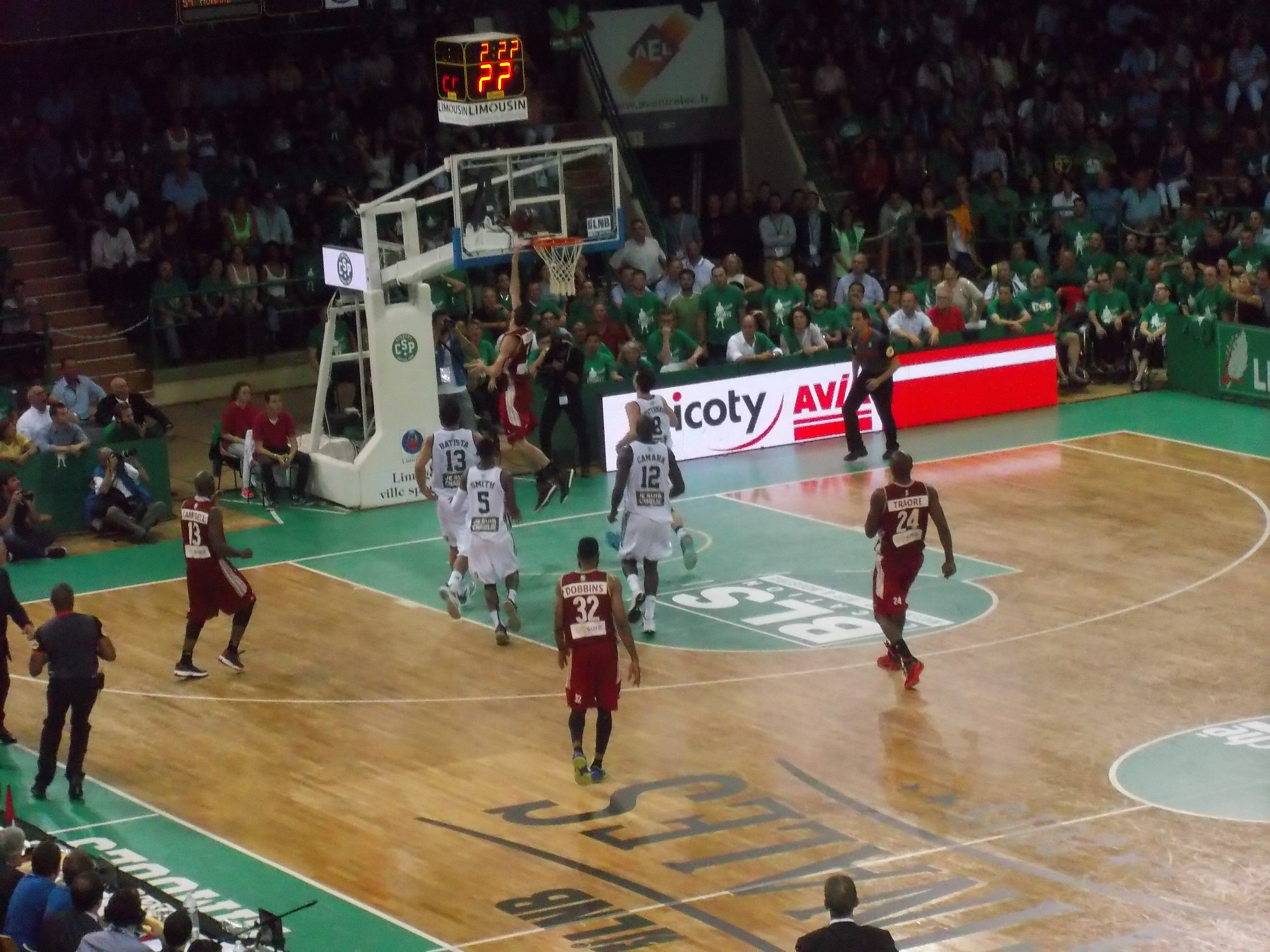
Game 3 of the Finals between Limoges and Strasbourg

Quarterfinals
1	Strasbourg	2
8	Chalon-sur-Saône	1
4	Le Mans	2
5	ASVEL	1
2	Nanterre	0
7	Nancy	2
3	Limoges	2
6	Le Havre	0

Semifinals
1	Strasbourg	3
4	Le Mans	0
7	Nancy	0
3	Limoges	3

Finals
1	Strasbourg	1
3	Limoges	3

== Awards ==
Awards	Player	Team
MVP	(France) Adrien Moerman	Limoges
Finals MVP	(France) Ousmane Camara	Limoges
Best Coach	(France) Vincent Collet	Strasbourg
Best Young Player	(France) Petr Cornelie	Le Mans
Best Defender	(France) Florent Piétrus	Nancy
Most Improved Player	(France) Benjamin Sene	Nancy

== All-Star Game ==
(France) Team National
Pos	Player	Team
Starters
G	Antoine Diot	Strasbourg IG
G	Pape Sy	BCM Gravelines
F	Charles Kahudi	Le Mans
F	Adrien Moerman	CSP Limoges
C	Mam Jaiteh	JSF Nanterre
Reserves
G	Andrew Albicy	BCM Gravelines
G	Léo Westermann	CSP Limoges
G	Rodrigue Beaubois	Le Mans
F	Nobel Boungou Colo	CSP Limoges
F	Florent Piétrus	SLUC Nancy
C	Johan Passave-Ducteil	JSF Nanterre
C	Alain Koffi	SPO Rouen
Head coach: Vincent Collet (Strasbourg IG)

Team International
Pos	Player	Team
Starters
G	(United States) Erving Walker	JDA Dijon
G	(United States) Jamar Smith	CSP Limoges
F	(United States) Mykal Riley	JSF Nanterre
F	(United States) Kyle Weems	JSF Nanterre
C	(United States) Sharrod Ford	Paris-Levallois
Reserves
G	(United States) Steven Gray	JDA Dijon
G	(United States) Mark Payne	Châlons-Reims
G	(United States) Kenny Boynton	SOM Boulogne
F	(United States) Daequan Cook	SPO Rouen
F	(Dominican Republic) Ricardo Greer	STB Le Havre
C	(United States) Zachery Peacock	Cholet
C	(United States) Marcus Dove	Elan Chalon
Head coach: Jean-Marc Dupraz (CSP Limoges)
