= Tony Dobbins =

American-Italian basketball player

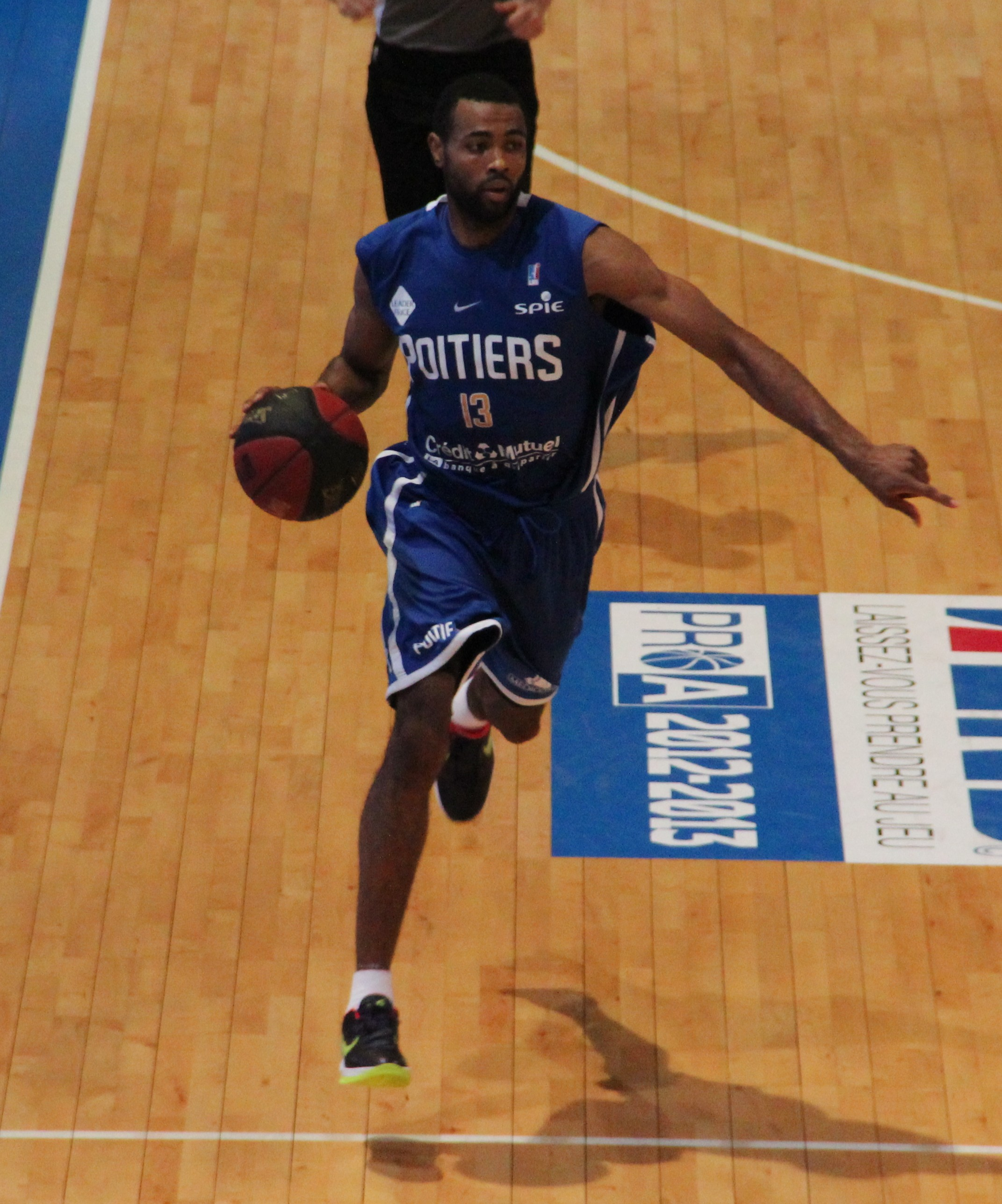
- Dobbins with Poitiers 86 in 2012

Boston Celtics
- Title: Assistant coach
- League: NBA

Personal information
- Born: August 23, 1981 (age 45) Washington, D.C., U.S.
- Listed height: 6 ft 5 in (1.96 m)
- Listed weight: 190 lb (86 kg)

Career information
- High school: Maret School (Washington, D.C.)
- College: Virginia Tech (1999–2000); Richmond (2001–2004)
- NBA draft: 2004: undrafted
- Playing career: 2004–2017
- Position: Shooting guard
- Coaching career: 2020–present

Career history

Playing
- 2004: St. Louis SkyHawks
- 2004–2005: Asheville Altitude
- 2005: Oklahoma Storm
- 2005: Trapani
- 2005–2006: Livorno
- 2006: Makedonikos
- 2007–2008: Cholet
- 2008–2010: Entente Orléanaise
- 2010: Murcia
- 2010–2011: Hyères-Toulon
- 2012–2013: Poitiers 86
- 2013–2014: JDA Dijon
- 2014–2015: SIG Strasbourg
- 2015–2016: Viola Reggio Calabria
- 2016: BCM Gravelines
- 2016–2017: Scafati

Coaching
- 2020–present: Boston Celtics (assistant)

Career highlights
- As player: 2× French Cup winner (2010, 2015); 2× Leaders Cup winner (2008, 2015); 3× Pro A Best Defensive Player (2009, 2013, 2014); NBDL champion (2005); As assistant coach: NBA champion (2024)

Anthony Dobbins (born August 23, 1981) is an American-Italian professional basketball coach and former player who is an assistant coach for the Boston Celtics of the National Basketball Association (NBA).

== Professional career ==
On August 6, 2013, he signed with JDA Dijon for the 2013–14 season. At the end of the season, he was again named the French League Best Defensive player of the Year.

On July 17, 2014, Dobbins signed with French club Strasbourg IG for the 2014–15 season.

On November 13, 2015, he signed with Viola Reggio Calabria for the 2015–16 Serie A2 Basket season.

On September 8, 2016, he signed with French club BCM Gravelines. On November 6, 2016, he parted ways with Gravelines after appearing in seven league games and three FIBA Europe Cup games. On December 17, 2016, he returned to Italian Serie A2 and signed with Scafati Basket.

== Coaching career ==
In 2020, he was promoted as an assistant coach by the Boston Celtics after spending two years as video team with the Celtics. Dobbins became an NBA champion when the Celtics defeated the Dallas Mavericks in 5 games in the 2024 NBA Finals.
