= Le Palio (Boulazac) =

Indoor sports arena in Boulazac, Périgueux, France

Coordinates: 45.1838°N 0.7607°E

- Le Palio
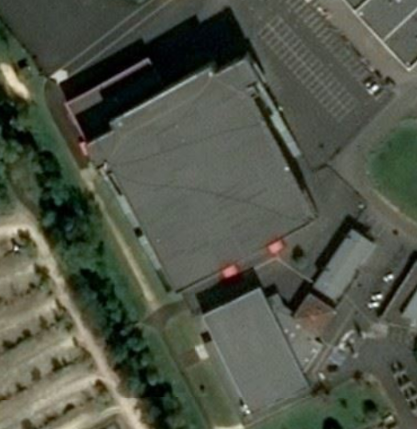
- Interactive map of Le Palio (Boulazac)
- Full name: Salle des sports du Palio (Boulazac)
- Location: Boulazac, Périgueux, France
- Capacity: Basketball: 5,200
- Surface: Parquet

Construction
- Opened: 2008
- Renovated: 2011
- Expanded: 2011
- Cost: €13 million (2008) €700,000 (2011)

Le Palio, or Salle des sports du Palio, is an indoor sports arena that is located in Boulazac, Périgueux, Dordogne, France. It is used to host sports competitions and concerts. The arena has a seating capacity of 5,200 people for basketball games.

== History ==
The arena was originally opened in the year 2008. The arena has been used as the home arena of the professional basketball team, Boulazac Basket Dordogne, since 2008. In December 2011, the arena's seating capacity for basketball games was increased to 5,200.

On November 12, 2015, CSP Limoges used the arena to host a Euroleague 2015–16 season game against Olimpia Milano.

== Dimensions ==
- 73 m × 70 m
- Height 21.73 m
- Floor area 5,110 m2
- Dressing rooms: 500 m2
- Reception area 200 m2
- Catering 100 and 90 m2
- Hall area 1,500 m2
