= 2019–20 Pro A season =

2019–20 Pro A
- Season: 2019–20
- Dates: 21 September 2019 – 27 March 2020
- Games played: 326
- Teams: 18

Regular season
- Top seed: ASVEL
- Champions League: JDA Dijon; SIG Strasbourg; Limoges CSP; Cholet
- EuroCup: Metropolitans 92; JL Bourg; Nanterre 92

Finals
- Champions: None named due to COVID-19 pandemic

The 2019–20 Pro A season, for sponsorships reasons the Jeep Élite, was the 98th season of the Pro A, the top basketball league in France organised by the Ligue Nationale de Basket (LNB). It was the third season with Jeep as main sponsor. The season started on 21 September 2019. On 31 March 2020, the league was suspended until further notice due to the COVID-19 pandemic. On 27 May 2020, the league was declared void and cancelled. No champion was named for the first time in the history of the league.

== Teams ==
Location of teams in the 2019–20 Pro A season

=== Promotion and relegation ===
Fos Provence and Antibes Sharks were relegated after the 2018–19 season after the teams ended in the last two places.

Roanne and Orléans were promoted from the Pro B League.

=== Locations and arenas ===
Team	Home city	Stadium	Capacity
AS Monaco	Fontvieille, Monaco	Salle Gaston Médecin	3,700
ASVEL	Lyon–Villeurbanne	Astroballe	5,556
BCM Gravelines-Dunkerque	Gravelines	Sportica	3,500
Boulazac Dordogne	Boulazac	Le Palio	5,200
Champagne Châlons Reims	Reims	Complexe René-Tys	3,000
Cholet	Cholet	La Meilleraie	5,191
Élan Béarnais Pau-Lacq-Orthez	Pau	Palais des Sports de Pau	7,707
Élan Chalon	Chalon-sur-Saône	Le Colisée	5,000
ESSM Le Portel	Le Portel	Le Chaudron	3,500
JDA Dijon	Dijon	Palais des Sports de Dijon	5,000
JL Bourg	Bourg-en-Bresse	Ekinox	3,548
Le Mans Sarthe	Le Mans	Antarès	6,003
Limoges CSP	Limoges	Beaublanc	6,000
Metropolitans 92 (Note: Renamed from Levallois Metropolitans in the 2019 offseason.)	Levallois	Palais des Sports Marcel Cerdan	4,000
Nanterre 92	Nanterre	Palais des Sports de Nanterre	3,000
Orléans Loiret	Orléans	Palais des Sports	3,222
Roanne	Roanne	Halle André Vacheresse	5,000
SIG Strasbourg	Strasbourg	Rhénus Sport	6,200

== Regular season ==
=== League table ===
Pos	Team	Pld	W	L	PF	PA	PD	Qualification or relegation
1	Monaco	24	21	3	2028	1706	+322	Qualification for Eurocup
2	JDA Dijon	25	21	4	2124	1868	+256	Qualification for Basketball Champions League (Note: Because the season was cancelled, the BCL selected French clubs based upon their BCL club ranking.)
3	LDLC ASVEL	24	20	4	2045	1842	+203	Qualification for EuroLeague (Note: LDLC ASVEL holds a wild card for the 2020–21 EuroLeague and does not need to qualify based on domestic position.)
4	Metropolitans 92	25	18	7	2251	2186	+65	Qualification for Eurocup
5	JL Bourg	25	16	9	2082	2023	+59	Qualification for Eurocup
6	Cholet	25	14	11	2004	1977	+27	Qualification for Basketball Champions League (Note: Because the season was cancelled, the BCL selected French clubs based upon their BCL club ranking.)
7	Nanterre 92	25	14	11	2135	2057	+78	Qualification for Eurocup
8	Limoges CSP	25	12	13	2031	2032	−1	Qualification for Basketball Champions League (Note: Because the season was cancelled, the BCL selected French clubs based upon their BCL club ranking.)
9	Le Mans Sarthe	25	11	14	2048	2089	−41	
10	SIG Strasbourg	24	10	14	1961	1987	−26	Qualification for Basketball Champions League (Note: Because the season was cancelled, the BCL selected French clubs based upon their BCL club ranking.)
11	ÉB Pau-Lacq-Orthez	25	10	15	1969	2065	−96	
12	Élan Chalon	25	10	15	2056	2201	−145	
13	Orléans Loiret	25	10	15	2105	2162	−57	
14	Champagne Châlons Reims	25	9	16	2084	2138	−54	
15	Boulazac Basket Dordogne	25	8	17	2057	2124	−67	
16	Roanne (Note: As the league was cancelled prematurely, the LNB ruled there would be no relegation this season.)	25	8	17	2027	2210	−183	
17	BCM Gravelines	25	7	18	1896	2029	−133	
18	ESSM Le Portel	24	4	20	1826	2033	−207	

Source: LNB.fr
Rules for classification: 1) points; 2) Head-to-head; 3) Points difference; 4) Points scored.

=== Results ===
Home \ Away	ASV	MET	JLB	DIJ	MON	CHO	GRA	BOU	CHA	LMS	ORL	STR	ELA	LIM	NAN	PAU	ROA	POR
LDLC ASVEL	—	69–79	104–71			85–76	103–86	78–69	83–76	101–85	97–80		95–70	94–84		76–68		94–69
Metropolitans 92	76–86	—	88–78	64–72	80–71		88–63		121–115		93–87	97–89	92–88	108–106	101–90		86–83	
JL Bourg	82–85		—	73–101		74–72	89–80	96–72		86–55	90–79	80–72	109–85		85–89	84–62	83–71	94–82
JDA Dijon	70–79		84–70	—	71–85	97–68	95–76			100–74	90–71			79–73	84–80	96–57	74–77	88–85
Monaco	79–59	98–67	94–89	80–67	—			86–71	88–74		108–76	86–70			79–69	89–76	71–65	
Cholet	80–91	74–86	88–60	72–85	71–84	—	83–65	94–90	76–68		70–67		93–99	90–79			85–59	80–72
BCM Gravelines		70–80		80–88	63–79	73–79	—	108–106	71–74			73–91	63–64	92–80		64–59	90–61	64–58
Boulazac Basket Dordogne	66–68	97–101		68–78	71–68			—	94–84	78–72	93–97	80–86	70–73	84–81	91–62	83–84	96–77	80–74
Champagne Châlons Reims			79–81	86–88	89–100			100–89	—	78–87	91–99			80–77	98–91	83–88	74–76	97–87
Le Mans Sarthe	85–74	104–83	91–93		73–66	81–75	70–74	99–78	63–72	—		82–90	88–80	102–84	79–85			109–80
Orléans Loiret		85–84		65–85		80–83	90–78			91–99	—	77–86	125–129	78–84	79–78	88–87	105–72	110–62
SIG Strasbourg	88–89	81–97		72–82	83–98	75–80			69–83		77–80	—	95–75	105–100	90–93	69–65		
Élan Chalon	99–96	90–98	64–79	78–90	56–80	89–79		71–85	75–83	84–83		79–82	—		75–73		85–84	95–84
Limoges CSP	69–75		80–83		66–86	79–74	77–71	88–75	92–79	78–55	99–87	77–61	75–73	—		77–70		66–65
Nanterre 92	66–91	66–81	85–70			86–101	98–80	85–78	104–84	98–79	63–68	85–70		93–71	—	101–89	108–79	
ÉB Pau-Lacq-Orthez		110–114	87–93	64–81	75–101	82–83	89–80		75–82	85–64	82–60	74–73	92–86			—		64–57
Roanne	69–73	116–108		87–93			81–109	83–68	96–89	100–84	82–81	83–84	108–94	73–89	79–102	97–100	—	
ESSM Le Portel		98–79	74–90	84–86	60–83	71–78	80–61	97–88		76–85		72–103			76–85	84–85	79–69	—

Updated to match(es) played on 9 March 2020. Source: LNB
Legend: Blue = home team win; Red = away team win.
Matches with lighter background shading were decided after overtime.

== Statistical leaders ==
Regular season
Category	Player	Club	Average
Points per game	(Bosnia and Herzegovina) Miralem Halilović	Orléans	17.6
Rebounds per game	(United States) Chris Horton	Cholet	8.9
Assists per game	(United States) Brandon Taylor	Le Mans	7
Steals per game	(United States) Briante Weber	Boulogne-Levallois	2,7
Blocks per game	(Zimbabwe) Vitalis Chikoko	Boulogne-Levallois	1,9
FG%	(Mali) Nianta Diarra	Cholet	68,2 %
Three-point %	(Nigeria) Obi Emegano	Le Mans	50,6 %
Free throw %	(Canada) Kenny Chery	Nanterre	97,9 %
Evaluation	(United States) Chris Horton	Cholet	23,6

== French clubs in European competitions ==
Team	Competition	Progress
LDLC ASVEL	EuroLeague	Regular season
Monaco	EuroCup	Quarterfinals
Limoges	EuroCup	Regular season
Nanterre 92	EuroCup	Regular season
JDA Dijon	Champions League	Round of 16
Pau-Lacq Orthez	Champions League	Regular season
SIG Strasbourg	Champions League	Regular season
