= SLUC Nancy Basket =

- Nickname: Couguars (The Cougars)
- Leagues: LNB Pro A Europe Cup
- Founded: 1967; 59 years ago
- Arena: Jean Weille
- Capacity: 6,027
- Location: Nancy, France
- Team colors: Red, white, grey, black
- President: Aurélien Fortier
- Head coach: Sylvain Lautié
- Championships: 1 Korać Cup; 2 French Championships; 1 French League Cup; 2 Match des Champions
- Website: sluc-basket.fr
Home	Away

Stade Lorrain Université Club Nancy Basket, commonly referred to as SLUC Nancy Basket, is a French professional basketball club based in Nancy. The club currently competes in the LNB Pro A, the top league in France, and holds two league titles. SLUC was also a regular member of the EuroCup competition.

== History ==
SLUC Nancy was founded in 1967. The club won the French 2nd Division championship in 1994. The club won the French 1st Division championship in the years 2008 and 2011. They also won the French Leaders Cup title in 2005, and the French Super Cup title in 2008 and 2011.

In pan European competition, SLUC Nancy won the European-wide 3rd-tier level league, the FIBA Korać Cup, in the 2001–02 season.

== Arena ==
SLUC Nancy plays its home games at the 6,027 seat Palais des Sports Jean Weille.

== Titles ==
=== Domestic ===
French League

- Winners (2): 2007–08, 2010–11

LNB Pro B

- Winners (2): 1993–94, 2021–22

Leaders Cup

- Winners (1): 2005

French Super Cup

- Winners (2): 2008, 2011

=== European ===
FIBA Korać Cup

- Winners (1): 2001–02

=== Other competitions ===
Nancy, France Basketball Tournament

- Winners (1): 2008

== Logos ==
Primary logo (since 2015).

== Players ==
=== Current roster ===
Note: Flags indicate national team eligibility at FIBA-sanctioned events. Players may hold other non-FIBA nationalities not displayed.

SLUC Nancy Basket roster
Players
Coaches

Pos.	No.	Nat.	Name	Ht.	Age
G	0	(United States)	Hammond, Marcus	1.91 m (6 ft 3 in)	26 – 30 June 2000
G/F	2	(United States)	Marshall Jr., Carlos	1.98 m (6 ft 6 in)	27 – 27 April 1999
SG	6	(Iran)	Amini, Mohammad	2.01 m (6 ft 7 in)	21 – 26 April 2005
F	8	(France) (Martinique)	Marsillon-Noléo, Kevin	2.01 m (6 ft 7 in)	24 – 6 May 2002
PG	10	(France)	Goudou-Sinha, Enzo	1.82 m (6 ft 0 in)	27 – 26 November 1998
F/C	13	(France)	Gombauld, Stephane	2.05 m (6 ft 9 in)	29 – 5 March 1997
G	14	(France)	Issa-Pavy, Noah	1.87 m (6 ft 2 in)	19 – 28 February 2007
F	17	(France)	Ntsontso Djoni, Erwan	1.99 m (6 ft 6 in)	19 – 6 July 2007
SG	20	(United States)	Weathers, Michael	1.91 m (6 ft 3 in)	29 – 5 August 1997
G	21	(France)	Villain, Axel	1.93 m (6 ft 4 in)	20 – 2 February 2006
F/C	26	(Cameroon)	Eyaga Bidias, Brice	2.03 m (6 ft 8 in)	27 – 26 November 1998
F/C	50	(United States)	Cozart, Isaiah	2.00 m (6 ft 7 in)	25 – 13 April 2001
G	97	(Ivory Coast)	Chaney, Theo	1.92 m (6 ft 4 in)	19 – 23 November 2006

Head coach

- (France) Sylvain Lautié

Assistant coach(es)

- (France) Quentin Boullet
- (France) Jessy Valet

Legend

- (C) Team captain
- Injured

- Roster
Updated: October 13, 2026

=== Depth chart ===
Pos.	Starting 5	Bench 1	Bench 2
C	Stephane Gombauld	Brice Eyaga Bidias	Kany N'Kouka
PF	Isaiah Cozart	Yaphet-Wilfried Moundi	Erwan Ntsontso Djoni
SF	Carlos Marshall Jr.	Kevin Marsillon-Noléo	Axel Villain
SG	Michael Weathers	Mohammad Amini	Theo Chaney
PG	Enzo Goudou-Sinha	Marcus Hammond	Noah Issa-Pavy

=== Notable players ===
Note: Flags indicate national team eligibility at FIBA-sanctioned events. Players may hold other non-FIBA nationalities not displayed.

Criteria

To appear in this section a player must have either:

- Set a club record or won an individual award while at the club
- Played at least one official international match for their national team at any time
- Played at least one official NBA match at any time.

- (France) Nicolas Batum
- (France) Hervé Dubuisson
- (France) Joseph Gomis
- (France) Jonathan Jeanne
- (France) Cyril Julian
- (France) Tariq Kirksay
- (France) Vincent Masingue
- (France) Mickaël Piétrus
- (France) Maxime Zianveni
- (Dominican Republic) Ricardo Greer
- (Finland) Pekka Markkanen
- (United States) Brandon Brown
- (United States) Tremmell Darden
- (United States) Willie Deane
- (United States) Donte Grantham
- (United States) Phil Handy
- (United States) Dario Hunt
- (United States) Mike James
- (United States) Derrick Lewis
- (United States) Jimmy Oliver
- (United States) Mike Scott
- (United States) Marcus Slaughter
- (Venezuela) John Cox

== Head coaches ==
- (France) Hervé Dubuisson
- (France) Grégor Beugnot
