= Eurocup Basketball 2011–12 Regular Season Group A =

Standings and Results for Group A of the Regular Season phase of the 2011–12 Eurocup basketball tournament.

== Standings ==
Key to colors
Top two teams advance to Last 16

	Team	Pld	W	L	PF	PA	Diff
1.	(France) Gravelines	6	5	1	517	430	+87
2.	(Ukraine) Donetsk	6	5	1	463	443	+20
3.	(Israel) Hapoel Jerusalem	6	2	4	463	493	−30
4.	(Croatia) Cibona	6	0	6	456	533	−77

== Fixtures and results ==
All times given below are in Central European Time.

=== Game 1 ===
15 November 2011
18:00

Report

Cibona (Croatia)	71–101	(France) Gravelines
Scoring by quarter: 12–27, 20–24, 21–25, 18–25
Pts: Rozić 18; Rebs: Zubčić, Rozić 5 Asts: Zubčić, Rozić 3		Pts: Albicy 21; Rebs: Edwards, Vaty 7 Asts: Albicy 4

Dražen Petrović Basketball Hall, Zagreb
Attendance: 1,500
Referees: Recep Ankarali (TUR), Marius Ciulin (ROU), Aleksandar Milojevik (MKD)

15 November 2011
18:00

Report

Donetsk (Ukraine)	80–71	(Israel) Hapoel Jerusalem
Scoring by quarter: 23–20, 17–14, 23–20, 17–17
Pts: Gliebov 15; Rebs: Lee 13; Asts: three players 3		Pts: Strawberry 22; Rebs: Randle 5 Asts: Strawberry 2

Meridian Sports Complex, Kyiv
Attendance: 1,500
Referees: Dubravko Muhvic (CRO), Sergey Mikhaylov (RUS), Nikola Lepetic (MNE)

=== Game 2 ===
22 November 2011
18:00

Report

Hapoel Jerusalem (Israel)	89–73	(Croatia) Cibona
Scoring by quarter: 19–16, 28–17, 20–20, 22–20
Pts: Randle 16; Rebs: Varnado 7 Asts: Naimy 6		Pts: Žižić 16; Rebs: Žižić 7 Asts: Zubčić, Kus 4

Malha Arena, Jerusalem
Attendance: 1,600
Referees: Christos Christodoulou (GRE), Rüstü Nuran (TUR), Jasmina Juras (SRB)

22 November 2011
20:00

Report

Gravelines (France)	78–53	(Ukraine) Donetsk
Scoring by quarter: 19–12, 23–16, 15–17, 21–8
Pts: Sy 16; Rebs: Vaty 8 Asts: Sy 3		Pts: Avdalović 16; Rebs: Lee 11; Asts: Radenović 4

Gravelines Sportica, Gravelines
Attendance: 2,500
Referees: Tolga Sahin (ITA), Elias Koromilas (GRE), Francisco Araña (ESP)

=== Game 3 ===
29 November 2011
18:00

Report

Donetsk (Ukraine)	98–81	(Croatia) Cibona
Scoring by quarter: 21–17, 30–18, 28–21, 19–25
Pts: Curry 23; Rebs: Radenović 6 Asts: Curry, Jackson 4		Pts: Kus 14; Rebs: Žižić 5 Asts: Barbour, Kus 3

Druzhba Palace of Sports, Donetsk
Attendance: 4,166
Referees: Murat Biricik (TUR), Oscar Lefwerth (SWE), Marcin Kowalski (POL)

29 November 2011
18:45

Report

Hapoel Jerusalem (Israel)	75–91	(France) Gravelines
Scoring by quarter: 17–22, 24–31, 26–18, 8–20
Pts: Strawberry 20; Rebs: Varnado 11; Asts: Naimy 6		Pts: Jomby 19; Rebs: Edwards, Issa 7 Asts: Albicy 4

Malha Arena, Jerusalem
Attendance: 1,800
Referees: Zoran Sutulovic (MNE), Ioannis Foufis (GRE), Haris Bijedic (BIH)

=== Game 4 ===
6 December 2011
18:00

Report

Cibona (Croatia)	76–78	(Ukraine) Donetsk
Scoring by quarter: 15–16, 19–22, 21–23, 21–17
Pts: Žižić 16; Rebs: Žižić 12; Asts: Zubčić 3		Pts: Curry 16; Rebs: Kravtsov 9 Asts: Curry, Avdalović 4

Dražen Petrović Basketball Hall, Zagreb
Attendance: 1,000
Referees: Radomir Vojinovic (MNE), Enrico Sabetta (ITA), Omer Esteron (ISR)

6 December 2011
20:00

Report

Gravelines (France)	97–74	(Israel) Hapoel Jerusalem
Scoring by quarter: 27–13, 24–20, 23–22, 22–19
Pts: Jomby 23; Rebs: Issa 8 Asts: Albicy 10		Pts: Kadir 14; Rebs: Kadir 7 Asts: Strawberry, Naimy 3

Gravelines Sportica, Gravelines
Attendance: 2,500
Referees: Vicente Bulto (ESP), Boris Shulga (UKR), Oscar Perea (ESP)

=== Game 5 ===
13 December 2011
18:45

Report

Hapoel Jerusalem (Israel)	68–74	(Ukraine) Donetsk
Scoring by quarter: 22–17, 14–25, 22–15, 10–17
Pts: Grunfeld 17; Rebs: Grunfeld 8 Asts: Varnado 4		Pts: Curry 19; Rebs: Radenović 10; Asts: Avdalović 4

Malha Arena, Jerusalem
Attendance: 1,800
Referees: Tasos Piloidis (GRE), Aleksandar Milojevic (MKD), Gentian Cici (ALB)

13 December 2011
20:00

Report

Gravelines (France)	81–77	(Croatia) Cibona
Scoring by quarter: 21–15, 19–21, 16–21, 25–20
Pts: Vaty 20; Rebs: Vaty 7 Asts: Bokolo, Albicy 5		Pts: Žižić 20; Rebs: Žižić 8 Asts: Rozić, Kus 3

Gravelines Sportica, Gravelines
Attendance: 2,500
Referees: Luis Lopes (POR), M. A. Perez Niz (ESP), Seffi Shemmesh (ISR)

=== Game 6 ===
20 December 2011
20:00

Report

Donetsk (Ukraine)	80–69	(France) Gravelines
Scoring by quarter: 19–24, 24–17, 22–11, 15–17
Pts: Curry 21; Rebs: Curry 8 Asts: Radenović 5		Pts: Reynolds 17; Rebs: three players 6 Asts: Bokolo 4

Druzhba Palace of Sports, Donetsk
Attendance: 3,492
Referees: Andrej Lovsin (SLO), Sergey Mikhaylov (RUS), Jurgis Laurinavicius (LTU)

20 December 2011
20:00

Report

Cibona (Croatia)	78–86	(Israel) Hapoel Jerusalem
Scoring by quarter: 18–19, 18–26, 20–25, 22–16
Pts: Chase 15; Rebs: Zubčić 9 Asts: Chase, Kus 2		Pts: Randle 17; Rebs: three players 4 Asts: Izraely 3

Dražen Petrović Basketball Hall, Zagreb
Attendance: 800
Referees: Andrej Jersan (SLO), Damir Javor (SLO), Miroslav Tomov (BUL)
