= Eurocup Basketball 2011–12 Last 16 Group I =

Standings and Results for Group I of the Last 16 phase of the 2011–12 Eurocup basketball tournament.

== Standings ==
Key to colors
Top two places in each group advance to the Quarterfinals

	Team	Pld	W	L	PF	PA	Diff	Tie-break
1.	(Spain) Valencia Basket	6	6	0	463	387	+76	
2.	(Czech Republic) Nymburk	6	3	3	484	441	+43	1–1 (+6)
3.	(Latvia) VEF Rīga	6	3	3	432	456	–24	1–1 (–6)
4.	(France) Gravelines	6	0	6	370	465	–95	

== Fixtures and results ==
All times given below are in Central European Time.

=== Game 1 ===
19 January 2012
18:30

Report

VEF Rīga (Latvia)	81–91	(Czech Republic) Nymburk
Scoring by quarter: 20–21, 10–27, 21–26, 30–17
Pts: Valters, Kavaliauskas 19; Rebs: Kavaliauskas 8 Asts: Valters 4		Pts: Benda 24; Rebs: Pumprla 9 Asts: Lawrence 4

Arena Riga, Riga
Attendance: 2,200
Referees: Sinisa Herceg (CRO), Renaud Geller (BEL), Sergiy Chebyshev (UKR)

19 January 2012
20:00

Report

Gravelines (France)	63–69	(Spain) Valencia Basket
Scoring by quarter: 14–15, 10–27, 19–14, 20–13
Pts: Johnson 14; Rebs: Edwards, Jomby 6 Asts: Bokolo, Edwards 4		Pts: de Colo 19; Rebs: Caner-Medley 14; Asts: de Colo 7

Gravelines Sportica, Gravelines
Attendance: 3,200
Referees: Fernando Rocha (POR), Gianluca Mattioli (ITA), Petar Obradovic (BIH)

=== Game 2 ===
24 January 2012
18:15

Report

Nymburk (Czech Republic)	79–62	(France) Gravelines
Scoring by quarter: 10–17, 21–11, 31–17, 17–17
Pts: Simmons 25; Rebs: Naymick 9 Asts: Simmons 7		Pts: Edwards 16; Rebs: Jomby, Vaty 4 Asts: Reynolds, Issa 2

ČEZ Aréna, Pardubice
Attendance: 1,440
Referees: Luigi Lamonica (ITA), Seffi Shemmesh (ISR), Sasa Maricic (SRB)

24 January 2012
20:30

Report

Valencia Basket (Spain)	80–49	(Latvia) VEF Rīga
Scoring by quarter: 25–10, 24–7, 21–13, 10–19
Pts: de Colo 18; Rebs: Faverani, Caner-Medley 7 Asts: de Colo 4		Pts: Bērziņš, Cain 10; Rebs: Cain 6 Asts: Three players 3

Pabellon Municipal Fuente San Luis, Valencia
Attendance: 4,500
Referees: Ilija Belosevic (SRB), Carmelo Paternico (ITA), Aleksandar Milojevik (MKD)

=== Game 3 ===
31 January 2012
17:00

Report

Nymburk (Czech Republic)	71–80	(Spain) Valencia Basket
Scoring by quarter: 12–20, 18–25, 26–14, 15–21
Pts: Simmons 20; Rebs: Three players 6 Asts: Lawrence 7		Pts: de Colo 32; Rebs: Caner-Medley 8 Asts: de Colo 5

ČEZ Aréna, Pardubice
Attendance: 2,832
Referees: Christos Christodoulou (GRE), Luis Lopes (POR), Roberto Chiari (ITA)

31 January 2012
18:30

Report

VEF Rīga (Latvia)	78–61	(France) Gravelines
Scoring by quarter: 27–18, 18–20, 16–12, 17–11
Pts: Kavaliauskas 23; Rebs: Cain 9 Asts: Valters 6		Pts: Akpomedah, Vaty 14; Rebs: Vaty 6 Asts: Reynolds, Albicy 3

Arena Riga, Riga
Attendance: 1,600
Referees: Srdan Dozai (CRO), Apostolos Kalpakas (SWE), Marcin Kowalski (POL)

=== Game 4 ===
7 February 2012
20:00

Report

Gravelines (France)	62–69	(Latvia) VEF Rīga
Scoring by quarter: 19–20, 19–21, 8–13, 16–15
Pts: Johnson 12; Rebs: Issa 7 Asts: Edwards 6		Pts: Bērziņš 19; Rebs: Bērziņš 6 Asts: Bertāns 6

Gravelines Sportica, Gravelines
Attendance: 2,000
Referees: Emilio Perez Pizarro (ESP), Andrej Jersan (SLO), Zdravko Rutesic (MNE)

7 February 2012
20:30

Report

Valencia Basket (Spain)	73–72	(Czech Republic) Nymburk
Scoring by quarter: 19–11, 21–17, 20–23, 13–21
Pts: Martínez 15; Rebs: Faverani 7 Asts: de Colo 10		Pts: Benda, Pumprla 18; Rebs: Benda 8 Asts: Křemen 6

Pabellon Municipal Fuente San Luis, Valencia
Attendance: 5,800
Referees: Sasa Pukl (SLO), Tolga Sahin (ITA), Moritz Reiter (GER)

=== Game 5 ===
21 February 2012
18:00

Report

Nymburk (Czech Republic)	80–84 (OT)	(Latvia) VEF Rīga
Scoring by quarter: 25–23, 14–13, 9–19, 20–13, Overtime: 12–16
Pts: Benda 22; Rebs: Nečas 10; Asts: Nečas 3		Pts: Bertāns 21; Rebs: Zavackas 11; Asts: Millage 7

ČEZ Aréna, Pardubice
Attendance: 1,500
Referees: Sergey Mikhaylov (RUS), Marko Juras (SRB), Tomas Trawicki (POL)

21 February 2012
20:30

Report

Valencia Basket (Spain)	79–61	(France) Gravelines
Scoring by quarter: 19–19, 22–17, 13–9, 25–16
Pts: Lishouk 14; Rebs: Lishouk 7 Asts: Marković 5		Pts: Albicy 18; Rebs: Vaty 8 Asts: Albicy 3

Pabellon Municipal Fuente San Luis, Valencia
Attendance: 6,500
Referees: Paolo Taurino (ITA), Carmelo Paternico (ITA), Sergio Silva (POR)

=== Game 6 ===
28 February 2012
18:00

Report

Gravelines (France)	61–91	(Czech Republic) Nymburk
Scoring by quarter: 22–25, 14–21, 13–23, 12–22
Pts: Bokolo 14; Rebs: Reynolds 6 Asts: Three players 2		Pts: Wilson 22; Rebs: Wilson 9 Asts: Lawrence 5

Gravelines Sportica, Gravelines
Attendance: 2,300
Referees: Dani Hierrezuelo (ESP), Fernando Rocha (POR), Oscar Perea (ESP)

28 February 2012
18:00

Report

VEF Rīga (Latvia)	71–82	(Spain) Valencia Basket
Scoring by quarter: 20–13, 15–19, 17–23, 13–29
Pts: Zavackas 17; Rebs: Zavackas 8 Asts: Millage 5		Pts: Ogilvy 20; Rebs: Caner-Medley 7 Asts: Newley 3

Arena Riga, Riga
Attendance: 5,000
Referees: Christos Christodoulou (GRE), Jakub Zamojski (POL), Jurgis Laurinavicius (LTU)
