= 2009–10 Euroleague Regular Season Group B =

Standings and Results for Group B of the regular season phase of the 2009–10 Euroleague basketball tournament.

== Standings ==
Key to colors
Top four places in each group advance to Top 16
Eliminated

	Team	Pld	W	L	PF	PA	Diff	Tie-break
1.	(Greece) Olympiacos Piraeus	10	8	2	884	787	+97	
2.	(Spain) Unicaja Málaga	10	7	3	784	775	+9	
3.	(Serbia) Partizan Belgrade	10	5	5	745	757	−12	
4.	(Turkey) Efes Pilsen Istanbul	10	4	6	808	793	+15	1–1 +8
5.	(Lithuania) Lietuvos Rytas Vilnius	10	4	6	741	784	−43	1–1 −8
6.	(France) Entente Orléans Loiret	10	2	8	722	788	−66	

== Fixtures and results ==
All times given below are in Central European Time.

Unless otherwise indicated, all attendance totals are from the corresponding match report posted on the official Euroleague site and included with each game summary.

=== Game 1 ===
21 October 2009
18:15

Report

Olympiacos Piraeus (Greece)	94–72	(France) Entente Orléans Loiret
Scoring by quarter: 18-15, 26-15, 22-19, 28-23
Pts: Kleiza 23; Rebs: Kleiza 9 Asts: Papaloukas 4		Pts: Covile, Nichols 18; Rebs: Covile 6 Asts: Curti 4

Peace and Friendship Stadium
Attendance: 7,000
Referees: José Martín (ESP), Marko Juras (SRB), Sergiy Chebyshev (UKR)

22 October 2009
18:45

Report

Lietuvos Rytas Vilnius (Lithuania)	77–70	(Turkey) Efes Pilsen Istanbul
Scoring by quarter: 21-16, 17-9, 24-21, 15-24
Pts: Gecevičius 21; Rebs: Zavackas, Baynes 6 Asts: Popović 10		Pts: Shumpert 12; Rebs: Kasun 5 Asts: Rakočević, Thornton 4

Siemens Arena
Attendance: 7,000
Referees: Grzegorz Ziemblicki(POL), Milija Vojinovic (SRB), Boris Shulga (UKR)

22 October 2009
20:45

Report

Partizan Belgrade (Serbia)	64–72	(Spain) Unicaja Málaga
Scoring by quarter: 25-19, 16-13, 11-17, 12-23
Pts: McCalebb 15; Rebs: Marić 6 Asts: McCalebb 5		Pts: Freeland 19; Rebs: Jiménez, Freeland, Blanco 4 Asts: Cook 6

Pionir Hall
Attendance: 6,173
Referees: Leonidas Spiridonos (GRE), Tolga Sahin(TUR), Marius Ciulin (ROU)

=== Game 2 ===
28 October 2009
20:45

Report

Unicaja Málaga (Spain)	86–68	(Greece) Olympiacos Piraeus
Scoring by quarter: 30-18, 18-20, 23-12, 15-18
Pts: Dean 19; Rebs: Freeland 11; Asts: Cook 5		Pts: Vujčić 17; Rebs: Kleiza 8 Asts: Papaloukas 6

Jose Maria Martin Carpena Arena
Attendance: 8,900
Referees: Luigi Lamonica (ITA), Fernando Rocha (POR), Renaud Geller (BEL)

29 October 2009
19:15

Report

Efes Pilsen Istanbul (Turkey)	77–67	(Serbia) Partizan Belgrade
Scoring by quarter: 15-15, 20-22, 22-16, 20-14
Pts: Smith 18; Rebs: Peker 8 Asts: Tunçeri, Arslan 5		Pts: Marić 19; Rebs: Vraneš 7 Asts: McCalebb 7

Abdi İpekçi Arena
Attendance: 8,000
Referees: José Martín (ESP), Costas Mouzakis (GRE), Paolo Taurino (ITA)

29 October 2009
19:15

Report

Entente Orléans Loiret (France)	62–69	(Lithuania) Lietuvos Rytas Vilnius
Scoring by quarter: 11-20, 18-21, 17-20, 16-8
Pts: Banks, Doellman 15; Rebs: Vaty, Dobbins 4 Asts: Sciarra 7		Pts: Gecevičius 16; Rebs: Borovnjak 8 Asts: Popović 9

Zénith d'Orléans
Attendance: 5,127
Referees: Saša Pukl (SLO), Gianpaolo Cicoria (ITA), Robert Lottermoser (GER)

=== Game 3 ===
4 November 2009
18:00

Report

Olympiacos Piraeus (Greece)	97–73	(Lithuania) Lietuvos Rytas Vilnius
Scoring by quarter: 25-14, 27-17, 23-19, 22-23
Pts: Kleiza 20; Rebs: Kleiza 6 Asts: Papaloukas, Teodosić 4		Pts: Bjelica 16; Rebs: Babrauskas, Borovnjak, Gecevičius 4 Asts: Gecevičius 4

Peace and Friendship Stadium
Attendance: 4,400
Referees: Dani Hierrezuelo (ESP), Sradan Dozai (CRO), Zdravko Rutešić (MNE)

5 November 2009
20:45

Report

Partizan Belgrade (Serbia)	78–71	(France) Entente Orléans Loiret
Scoring by quarter: 22-22, 23-18, 17-20, 16-11
Pts: Marić 18; Rebs: Marić 9 Asts: McCalebb 4		Pts: Doellman 16; Rebs: Doellman 8 Asts: Curti 5

Pionir Hall
Attendance: 5,038
Referees: Juan Carlos García González (ESP), Roberto Chiari (ITA), Sergey Mikhaylov (RUS)

5 November 2009
20:45

Report

Unicaja Málaga (Spain)	93–88 (OT) (OT)	(Turkey) Efes Pilsen Istanbul
Scoring by quarter: 23-20, 20-16, 16-19, 14-18, Overtime: 20-15
Pts: Dean 17; Rebs: Freeland 9 Asts: Cook 10		Pts: Thornton 19; Rebs: Peker 7 Asts: Arslan 8

Jose Maria Martin Carpena Arena
Attendance: 7,900
Referees: Shmuel Bachar (ISR), Jakub Zamojski (POL), Luis Lopes (POR)

=== Game 4 ===
11 November 2009
19:00

Report

Entente Orléans Loiret (France)	74–86	(Spain) Unicaja Málaga
Scoring by quarter: 13-12, 15-30, 27-28, 19-16
Pts: Vaty 15; Rebs: Vaty 10; Asts: Sciarra 9		Pts: Dean 30; Rebs: Freeland 11; Asts: Cook 6

Zénith d'Orléans
Attendance: 5,000
Referees: Costas Mouzakis (GRE), Siniša Herceg (CRO), Oliver Krause (GER)

12 November 2009
18:45

Report

Lietuvos Rytas Vilnius (Lithuania)	78–56	(Serbia) Partizan Belgrade
Scoring by quarter: 26-22, 18-17, 22-7, 12-10
Pts: Gecevičius 19; Rebs: Borovnjak 5 Asts: Gecevičius, Popović 5		Pts: Marić, McCalebb 16; Rebs: Marić 10; Asts: Rasic 4

Siemens Arena
Attendance: 8,500
Referees: Luigi Lamonica (ITA), Jakub Zamosjki (POL), Anna Cardus (ESP)

12 November 2009
20:00

Report

Olympiacos Piraeus (Greece)	105–90	(Turkey) Efes Pilsen Istanbul
Scoring by quarter: 24-27, 22-21, 30-21, 29-21
Pts: Bourousis 23; Rebs: Kleiza 11; Asts: Papaloukas 8		Pts: Kasun, Rakočević 15; Rebs: Kasun 12; Asts: Tunçeri 4

Peace and Friendship Stadium
Attendance: 7,200
Referees: Romualdas Brazauskas (LTU), Emilio Perez Pizarro (ESP), Carmelo Paternico (ITA)

=== Game 5 ===
26 November 2009
19:15

Report

Efes Pilsen Istanbul (Turkey)	77–64	(France) Entente Orléans Loiret
Scoring by quarter: 20-14, 20-15, 18-15, 19-20
Pts: Nachbar 12; Rebs: Kasun 6 Asts: Thornton 7		Pts: Nichols 16; Rebs: Doelman, Vaty 6 Asts: Curti 4

Ayhan Şahenk Arena
Attendance: 2,800
Referees: Fabio Facchini (ITA), Apostolos Kalpakas (SWE), Anna Cardus (ESP)

26 November 2009
20:45

Report

Unicaja Málaga (Spain)	91–84	(Lithuania) Lietuvos Rytas Vilnius
Scoring by quarter: 26-20, 23-19, 19-25, 23-20
Pts: Cook 16; Rebs: Jiménez 9 Asts: Cook 6		Pts: Jomantas 16; Rebs: Jomantas, Popović, Borovnjak 4 Asts: Gecevičius 4

Jose Maria Martin Carpena Arena
Attendance: 7,900
Referees: Carl Jungebrand (FIN), Milivoje Jovcic (SRB), Spiros Gontas (GRE)

26 November 2009
20:45

Report

Partizan Belgrade (Serbia)	86–80	(Greece) Olympiacos Piraeus
Scoring by quarter: 19-19, 19-24, 22-18, 26-19
Pts: Rašić 25; Rebs: Marić 15; Asts: Rašić 5		Pts: Childress, Kleiza 18; Rebs: Childress 7 Asts: Halperin 4

Pionir Hall
Attendance: 6,852
Referees: Shmuel Bachar (ISR), Guerrino Cerebuch (ITA), Antonio Conde (ESP)

=== Game 6 ===
2 December 2009
20:45

Report

Entente Orléans Loiret (France)	84–88	(Greece) Olympiacos Piraeus
Scoring by quarter: 27-18, 21-22, 18-18, 18-30
Pts: Doellman 17; Rebs: Doellman 6 Asts: Curti 6		Pts: Halperin 22; Rebs: Vasilopoulus 6 Asts: Papaloukas 14

Zénith d'Orléans
Referees: Juan Carlos Arteaga (ESP), Dubravko Muhvic (CRO), Vicente Bulto (ESP)

2 December 2009
20:45

Report

Unicaja Málaga (Spain)	64–72	(Serbia) Partizan Belgrade
Scoring by quarter: 18-21, 11-11, 15-17, 20-23
Pts: Freeland 12; Rebs: Lewis 7 Asts: Williams 4		Pts: Kecman 16; Rebs: Roberts 12; Asts: McCalebb 5

Jose Maria Martin Carpena Arena
Attendance: 7,000
Referees: Fabio Facchini (ITA), Robert Vyklicky (CZE), Murat Biricik (TUR)

3 December 2009
19:00

Report

Efes Pilsen Istanbul (Turkey)	77–62	(Lithuania) Lietuvos Rytas Vilnius
Scoring by quarter: 15-13, 17-21, 25-19, 20-9
Pts: Santiago 17; Rebs: Santiago 6 Asts: Tunçeri 7		Pts: Popović, Jomantas 12; Rebs: Jomantas 5 Asts: Popović 6

Ayhan Şahenk Arena
Attendance: 2,500
Referees: Juan Carlos Mitjana (ESP), Oliver Krause (GER), Oscar Perea (ESP)

=== Game 7 ===
9 December 2009
18:45

Report

Lietuvos Rytas Vilnius (Lithuania)	77–72	(France) Entente Orléans Loiret
Scoring by quarter: 23-10, 15-24, 23-21, 16-17
Pts: Zavackas 20; Rebs: Jomantas 7 Asts: Popović 7		Pts: Nichols 16; Rebs: Nichols, Vaty 6 Asts: Sciarra 5

Siemens Arena
Attendance: 5,000
Referees: Recep Ankarali (TUR), Robert Lottermoser (GER), Juan Carlos García González (ESP)

10 December 2009
20:00

Report

Olympiacos Piraeus (Greece)	89–68	(Spain) Unicaja Málaga
Scoring by quarter: 16-20, 30-15, 20-20, 23-13
Pts: Kleiza 15; Rebs: Kleiza 10; Asts: Papaloukas 7		Pts: Cook 18; Rebs: Printezis 7 Asts: Dean 3

Peace and Friendship Stadium
Attendance: 7,200
Referees: Grzegorz Ziemblicki (POL), Sreten Radović (CRO), David Chambon (FRA)

10 December 2009
20:45

Report

Partizan Belgrade (Serbia)	93–92	(Turkey) Efes Pilsen Istanbul
Scoring by quarter: 19-20, 27-28, 25-24, 22-20
Pts: Marić 34; Rebs: Marić 16; Asts: Kecman 6		Pts: Rakočević 24; Rebs: Peker 7 Asts: Rakočević, Tunçeri 3

Pionir Hall
Attendance: 7,022
Referees: Dani Hierrezuelo (ESP), Vicente Bulto (ESP), Marek Ćmikiewicz (POL)

=== Game 8 ===
16 December 2009
18:45

Report

Lietuvos Rytas Vilnius (Lithuania)	83–89 (OT)	(Greece) Olympiacos Piraeus
Scoring by quarter: 22-13, 12-20, 23-20, 17-21, Overtime: 9-15
Pts: Popović 19; Rebs: Zavackas 7 Asts: Jomantas 6		Pts: Bourousis, Kleiza 19; Rebs: Kleiza 11; Asts: Papaloukas 10

Siemens Arena
Attendance: 9,000
Referees: Juan Carlos Mitjana (ESP), Paolo Taurino (ITA), Emilio Pérez Pizarro (ESP)

17 December 2009
19:15

Report

Efes Pilsen Istanbul (Turkey)	77–79	(Spain) Unicaja Málaga
Scoring by quarter: 19-17, 20-24, 16-19, 22-19
Pts: Rakočević 21; Rebs: Peker 7 Asts: Smith 4		Pts: Printezis 15; Rebs: Jiménez 8 Asts: Cook 5

Ayhan Şahenk Spor Salonu
Attendance: 4,000
Referees: Luigi Lamonica (ITA), Christos Christodoulou (GRE), Milija Vojinovic (SRB)

17 December 2009
21:00

Report

Entente Orléans Loiret (France)	75–72	(Serbia) Partizan Belgrade
Scoring by quarter: 20-27, 19-7, 18-15, 18-23
Pts: Banks 19; Rebs: Moerman 7 Asts: Banks 7		Pts: Marić 20; Rebs: Marić 11; Asts: McCalebb 4

Palais des Sports 4
Attendance: 2,009
Referees: Lazaros Voreadis (GRE), Tomas Jasevicius (LTU), Oscar Perea (ESP)

=== Game 9 ===
6 January 2010
20:45

Report

Partizan Belgrade (Serbia)	97–67	(Lithuania) Lietuvos Rytas Vilnius
Scoring by quarter: 26-18, 24-21, 22-22, 25-6
Pts: Rašić 26; Rebs: Vraneš 9 Asts: McCalebb 4		Pts: Popović 17; Rebs: Bjelica 6 Asts: Popović 4

Pionir Hall
Attendance: 6,828
Referees: Luigi Lamonica(ITA), David Chambon (FRA), Panagiotis Anastopoulos (GRE)

7 January 2010
19:15

Report

Efes Pilsen Istanbul (Turkey)	85–93 (OT)	(Greece) Olympiacos Piraeus
Scoring by quarter: 21-19, 14-22, 18-17, 23-18, Overtime: 9-17
Pts: Smith, Peker 18; Rebs: Kasun, Peker 7 Asts: Tunçeri 8		Pts: Childress 23; Rebs: Kleiza 9 Asts: Teodosić 12

Abdi İpekçi Arena
Attendance: 11,000
Referees: Carl Jungebrand (FIN), Jakub Zamojski (POL), Fernando Rocha (POR)

7 January 2010
20:45

Report

Unicaja Málaga (Spain)	72–88	(France) Entente Orléans Loiret
Scoring by quarter: 21-14, 15-17, 21-25, 15-32
Pts: Printezis 18; Rebs: Printezis 7 Asts: Cook 11		Pts: Banks 23; Rebs: Covile, Moerman 8 Asts: Sciarra 3

Jose Maria Martin Carpena Arena
Attendance: 5,700
Referees: Romualdas Brazauskas (LTU), Sergiy Chebyshev (UKR), Petri Mäntylä (FIN)

=== Game 10 ===
13 January 2010
20:00

Report

Entente Orléans Loiret (France)	60–75	(Turkey) Efes Pilsen Istanbul
Scoring by quarter: 15-23, 16-14, 12-18, 17-20
Pts: Nichols 17; Rebs: Covile, Dobbins 5 Asts: Herve, Sciarra 3		Pts: Shumpert 21; Rebs: Thornton, Peker 6 Asts: Smith 7

Zénith d'Orléans
Attendance: 5,200
Referees: Zoran Šutulović (MNE), Spiros Gkontas (GRE), Gianluca Mattioli (ITA)

13 January 2010
20:00

Report

Lietuvos Rytas Vilnius (Lithuania)	71–73	(Spain) Unicaja Málaga
Scoring by quarter: 13-20, 22-13, 12-22, 24-18
Pts: Gecevičius 19; Rebs: Jomantas 9 Asts: Popović 5		Pts: Printezis 17; Rebs: Printezis 7 Asts: Cook 6

Siemens Arena
Attendance: 10,500
Referees: Lazaros Voreadis (GRE), Sradan Dozai (CRO), Sergey Mikhaylov (RUS)

13 January 2010
20:00

Report

Olympiacos Piraeus (Greece)	81–60	(Serbia) Partizan Belgrade
Scoring by quarter: 20-15, 16-18, 27-16, 18-11
Pts: Kleiza 16; Rebs: Vujčić 6 Asts: Teodosić 9		Pts: Roberts, McCalebb 14; Rebs: Veselý, Vraneš 7 Asts: McCalebb 3

Peace and Friendship Stadium
Attendance: 6,200
Referees: Juan Carlos Mitjana (ESP), Juan Carlos García González (ESP), Roberto Chiari (ITA)
