= 2013–14 Euroleague Regular Season Group D =

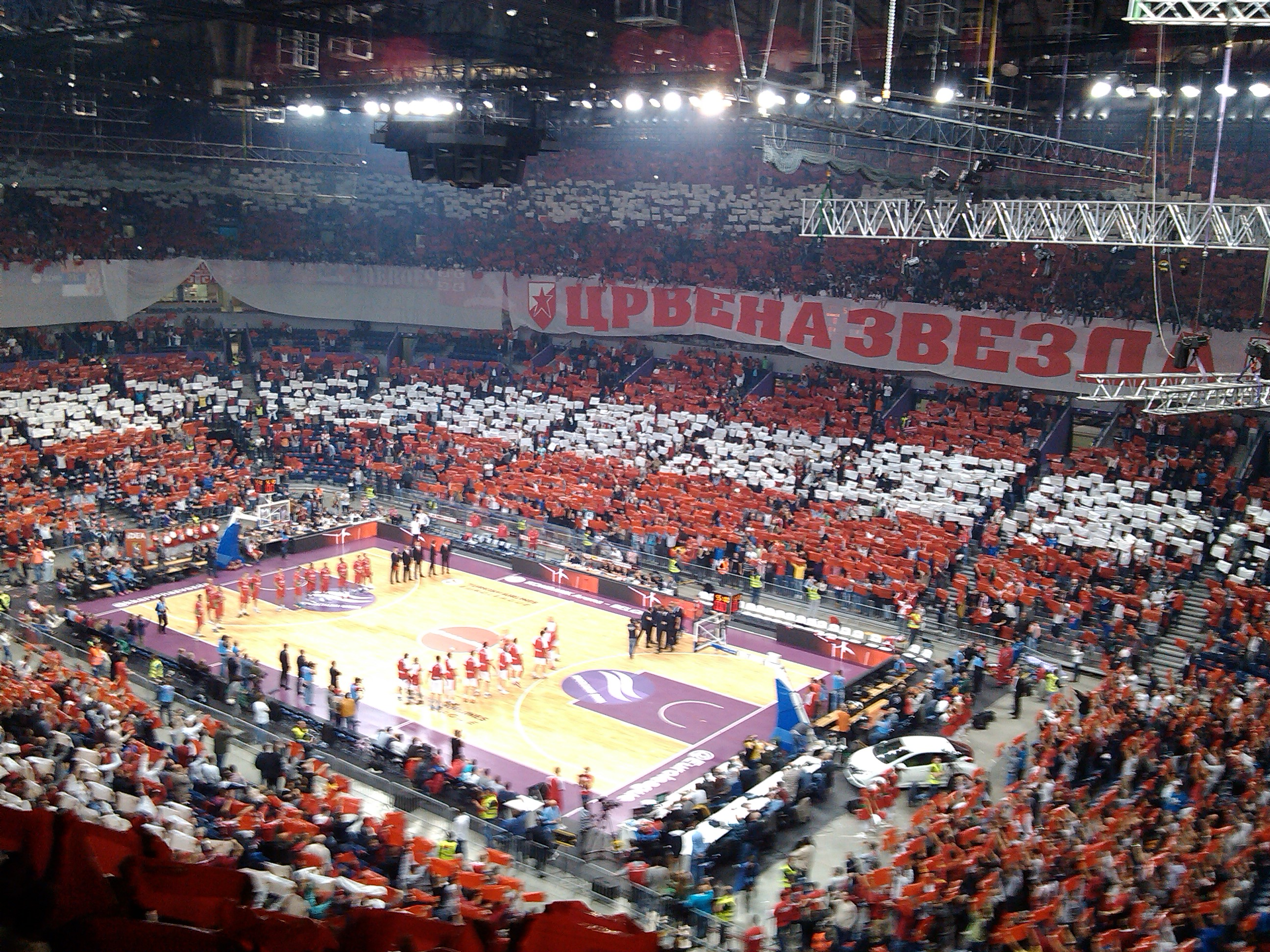
Belgrade's Kombank Arena with 19,000 spectators ahead of the Crvena zvezda vs. Lokomotiv Kuban game in October 2013, the home team's return to Euroleague after 14 seasons. The Krasnodar visitors ended up winning 84–87.

Standings and Results for Group D of the Regular Season phase of the 2013–14 Euroleague basketball tournament.

== Standings ==
Key to colors
Top four places advance to Top 16
Bottom two teams enter 2013–14 Eurocup Basketball Last 32 round

Pos	Team	Pld	W	L	PF	PA	PD	Tie
1	(Israel) Maccabi Tel Aviv	10	8	2	764	711	+53	
2	(Spain) Laboral Kutxa	10	6	4	767	754	+13	1–1 (+12)
3	(Russia) Lokomotiv Kuban	10	6	4	740	729	+11	1–1 (–12)
4	(Greece) Panathinaikos	10	5	5	768	736	+32	
5	(Serbia) Crvena Zvezda	10	4	6	804	779	+25	
6	(Lithuania) Lietuvos Rytas	10	1	9	686	820	−134	

== Fixtures and results ==
All times given below are in Central European Time.

=== Game 1 ===
17 October 2013
19:00

Boxscore

Crvena Zvezda Telekom (Serbia)	84–87	(Russia) Lokomotiv Kuban
Scoring by quarter: 20–30, 22–8, 17–20, 25–29
Pts: Schilb 17; Rebs: Marjanović 10; Asts: Schilb 6		Pts: Williams 23; Rebs: Hendrix 9 Asts: Kalnietis 7

Kombank Arena, Belgrade
Attendance: 19,000
Referees: Marek Cmikiewicz (POL), Carlos Cortes (ESP), Ersan Kartal (TUR)

17 October 2013
20:45

Boxscore

Laboral Kutxa (Spain)	84–80	(Israel) Maccabi Tel Aviv
Scoring by quarter: 24–18, 24–20, 14–23, 22–19
Pts: Hamilton 15; Rebs: Hamilton, Pleiß 8 Asts: Heurtel 5		Pts: Hickman 20; Rebs: Blu, Smith 5 Asts: Ohayon 5

Fernando Buesa Arena, Vitoria-Gasteiz
Attendance: 10,846
Referees: Ilija Belosevic (SRB), Luis Lopes (ESP), Joseph Bissang (FRA)

17 October 2013
20:45

Boxscore

Lietuvos Rytas (Lithuania)	84–83 (OT)	(Greece) Panathinaikos
Scoring by quarter: 25–25, 17–17, 17–18, 15–14, Overtime: 10–9
Pts: Seibutis 19; Rebs: Songaila 8 Asts: Cook 11		Pts: Mačiulis 13; Rebs: Mačiulis 8 Asts: Diamantidis 7

Siemens Arena, Vilnius
Attendance: 8,450
Referees: Juan Carlos Garcia Gonzalez (ESP), Srdan Dozai (CRO), Gianluca Mattioli (ITA)

=== Game 2 ===
24 October 2013
18:00

Boxscore

Lokomotiv Kuban (Russia)	68–53	(Lithuania) Lietuvos Rytas
Scoring by quarter: 19–10, 20–17, 16–14, 13–12
Pts: Brown 22; Rebs: Hendrix 11; Asts: Williams 9		Pts: Gecevičius, Glyniadakis 11; Rebs: Gecevičius, Palacios 5 Asts: Babrauskas, Seibutis 3

Basket-Hall, Krasnodar
Attendance: 4,274
Referees: Grzegorz Ziemblicki (POL), Seffi Shemmesh (ISR), Zdravko Rutesic (MNE)

24 October 2013
20:05

Boxscore

Maccabi Tel Aviv (Israel)	96–82	(Serbia) Crvena Zvezda Telekom
Scoring by quarter: 21–14, 22–18, 30–24, 23–26
Pts: Ingles 16; Rebs: Schortsanitis 5 Asts: 3 players 5		Pts: Marjanović 20; Rebs: Marjanović 13; Asts: Jenkins, Blazic 3

Nokia Arena, Tel Aviv
Attendance: 10,728
Referees: Christos Chsristodoulou (GRE), Sergiy Chebyshev (UKR), Petros Papapetrou (GRE)

25 October 2013
20:30

Boxscore

Panathinaikos (Greece)	95–74	(Spain) Laboral Kutxa
Scoring by quarter: 26–16, 24–19, 27–21, 18–18
Pts: Bramos 21; Rebs: Fotsis 6 Asts: Diamantidis 9		Pts: Nocioni 23; Rebs: Nocioni 12; Asts: Heurtel 5

Eleftheria Indoor Hall, Nicosia
Attendance: 6,200
Referees: Guerrino Cerebuch (ITA), Matej Boltauzer (SLO), Rustu Nuran (TUR)

=== Game 3 ===
31 October 2013
18:45

Boxscore

Lietuvos Rytas (Lithuania)	64–85	(Spain) Laboral Kutxa
Scoring by quarter: 20–25, 21–20, 13–17, 10–23
Pts: Gecevičius 14; Rebs: Palacios 9 Asts: Cook 10		Pts: Nocioni 20; Rebs: Nocioni 9 Asts: Hodge 5

Siemens Arena, Vilnius
Attendance: 6,700
Referees: Borys Ryzhyk (UKR), Olegs Latisevs (LAT), Damir Javor (SLO)

1 November 2013
17:00

Boxscore

Lokomotiv Kuban (Russia)	58–73	(Israel) Maccabi Tel Aviv
Scoring by quarter: 14–22, 18–24, 14–14, 12–13
Pts: Kalnietis 13; Rebs: Brown 5 Asts: Kalnietis 5		Pts: Hickman, Ingles 14; Rebs: Ingles 10; Asts: Hickman 6

Basket-Hall, Krasnodar
Attendance: 6,331
Referees: Guerrino Cerebuch (ITA), Milija Vojinovic (SRB), Tomasz Trawicki (POL)

1 November 2013
20:30

Boxscore

Crvena Zvezda Telekom (Serbia)	86–90 (OT)	(Greece) Panathinaikos
Scoring by quarter: 26–22, 22–11, 8–15, 18–26, Overtime: 12–16
Pts: Schilb 19; Rebs: Simonović 7 Asts: Schilb 5		Pts: Pappas 24; Rebs: Fotsis, Mačiulis 4 Asts: Diamantidis 9

Hala Pionir, Belgrade
Attendance: 7,500
Referees: Tolga Sahin (ITA), Antonio Conde (ESP), Carmelo Paternico (ITA)

=== Game 4 ===
7 November 2013
18:00

Boxscore

Lietuvos Rytas (Lithuania)	74–76	(Israel) Maccabi Tel Aviv
Scoring by quarter: 18–26, 15–19, 22–14, 19–17
Pts: Gecevičius 24; Rebs: Palacios 10; Asts: Cook 5		Pts: Smith 18; Rebs: Schortsanitis 7 Asts: Ingles 6

Siemens Arena, Vilnius
Attendance: 6,950
Referees: Vicente Bulto (ESP), Tolga Sahin (ITA), Robert Vyklicky (CZE)

7 November 2013
20:30

Boxscore

Laboral Kutxa (Spain)	63–73	(Serbia) Crvena Zvezda Telekom
Scoring by quarter: 15–25, 17–6, 19–23, 12–19
Pts: Bjelica 14; Rebs: Bjelica 7 Asts: Jelínek 3		Pts: Nelson 22; Rebs: Mitrović, Nelson 7 Asts: Radenović 3

Fernando Buesa Arena, Vitoria-Gasteiz
Attendance: 9,728
Referees: Fernando Rocha (POR), Spiros Gkontas (GRE), Miroslav Tomov (BUL)

7 November 2013
20:30

Boxscore

Panathinaikos (Greece)	69–72	(Russia) Lokomotiv Kuban
Scoring by quarter: 12–17, 19–19, 10–17, 28–19
Pts: Gist 18; Rebs: Mačiulis 6 Asts: Diamantidis 8		Pts: Jasaitis 14; Rebs: Hendrix 9 Asts: Kalnietis 6

Heraklion Arena, Heraklion
Attendance: 5,192
Referees: Recep Ankarali (TUR), Paolo Taurino (ITA), Petar Obradovic (BIH)

=== Game 5 ===
14 November 2013
17:00

Boxscore

Lokomotiv Kuban (Russia)	85–84	(Spain) Laboral Kutxa
Scoring by quarter: 21–13, 19–29, 21–16, 24–26
Pts: Brown 23; Rebs: Hendrix 9 Asts: Williams 9		Pts: Bjelica 16; Rebs: Pleiß 10; Asts: Hodge 8

Basket-Hall, Krasnodar
Attendance: 5,156
Referees: Christos Christodoulou (GRE), Robert Lottermoser (GER), Marcin Kowalski (POL)

14 November 2013
20:05

Boxscore

Maccabi Tel Aviv (Israel)	75–68	(Greece) Panathinaikos
Scoring by quarter: 25–12, 11–17, 20–18, 19–21
Pts: Ingles, Blu 14; Rebs: Blu 8 Asts: Hickman 6		Pts: Lasme 13; Rebs: Fotsis, Lasme 7 Asts: Diamantidis 8

Nokia Arena, Tel Aviv
Attendance: 10,728
Referees: Dani Hierrezuelo (ESP), Milivoje Jovcic (SRB), Boris Shulga (UKR)

15 November 2013
20:00

Boxscore

Crvena Zvezda Telekom (Serbia)	88–77	(Lithuania) Lietuvos Rytas
Scoring by quarter: 19–16, 23–24, 20–16, 26–21
Pts: Blažič 16; Rebs: Nelson 9 Asts: Marjanović, Mitrović 3		Pts: Gecevičius, Seibutis 17; Rebs: Palacios 5 Asts: Cook 10

Hala Pionir, Belgrade
Attendance: 7,500
Referees: Emilio Perez Pizarro (ESP), Roberto Chiari (ITA), Oscar Perea (ESP)

=== Game 6 ===
21 November 2013
20:30

Boxscore

Panathinaikos (Greece)	80–72	(Lithuania) Lietuvos Rytas
Scoring by quarter: 16–18, 9–20, 25–8, 30–26
Pts: Gist 24; Rebs: Fotsis 7 Asts: Ukić, Diamantidis 5		Pts: Jelovac 19; Rebs: Seibutis 7 Asts: Cook 6

O.A.C.A., Athens
Attendance: 7,000
Referees: Sreten Radovic (CRO), Miguel Angel Perez Niz (ESP), Milija Vojinovic (SRB)

21 November 2013
20:45

Boxscore

Maccabi Tel Aviv (Israel)	65–70	(Spain) Laboral Kutxa
Scoring by quarter: 16–20, 19–14, 14–17, 16–19
Pts: James 16; Rebs: Smith 7 Asts: Rice, Hickman 3		Pts: Pleiß 16; Rebs: Bjelica 10; Asts: Heurtel 5

Nokia Arena, Tel Aviv
Attendance: 10,728
Referees: Luigi Lamonica (ITA), Eddie Viator (FRA), Elias Koromilas (GRE)

22 November 2013
17:00

Boxscore

Lokomotiv Kuban (Russia)	79–72	(Serbia) Crvena Zvezda Telekom
Scoring by quarter: 18–19, 21–16, 19–21, 21–16
Pts: Brown 16; Rebs: Hendrix, Jasaitis 6 Asts: Williams 8		Pts: Simonović 12; Rebs: Katić, Marjanović 5 Asts: Schilb 6

Basket-Hall, Krasnodar
Attendance: 5,611
Referees: Jose Ramon Garcia Ortiz (ESP), Jakub Zamojski (POL), Anastasios Piloidis (GRE)

=== Game 7 ===
28 November 2013
18:30

Boxscore

Lietuvos Rytas (Lithuania)	53–84	(Russia) Lokomotiv Kuban
Scoring by quarter: 24–16, 7–23, 9–22, 13–23
Pts: Seibutis 15; Rebs: Gecevičius, Seibutis 5 Asts: Cook 4		Pts: Brown 20; Rebs: Brown 8 Asts: Williams 6

Siemens Arena, Vilnius
Attendance: 4,900
Referees: Ilija Belosevic (SRB), Marko Juras (SRB), Benjamin Jimenez (ESP)

28 November 2013
19:00

Boxscore

Crvena Zvezda Telekom (Serbia)	76–78	(Israel) Maccabi Tel Aviv
Scoring by quarter: 22–18, 11–17, 13–27, 30–16
Pts: Nelson, Radenović 12; Rebs: Mitrović 8 Asts: Nelson 5		Pts: Schortsanitis 22; Rebs: Tyus 7 Asts: Ohayon 9

Hala Pionir, Belgrade
Attendance: 7,500
Referees: Juan Carlos Arteaga (ESP), Rustu Nuran (TUR), Piotr Pastusiak (POL)

29 November 2013
20:30

Boxscore

Laboral Kutxa (Spain)	79–77	(Greece) Panathinaikos
Scoring by quarter: 34–19, 21–25, 10–18, 14–15
Pts: Bjelica 17; Rebs: Bjelica 6 Asts: San Emeterio, Kelati 4		Pts: Diamantidis, Mačiulis 19; Rebs: Mačiulis 8 Asts: Diamantidis 7

Fernando Buesa Arena, Vitoria-Gasteiz
Attendance: 14,196
Referees: Borys Ryzhyk (UKR), Olegs Latisevs (LAT), Marek Cmikiewicz (POL)

=== Game 8 ===
5 December 2013
20:05

Boxscore

Maccabi Tel Aviv (Israel)	75–73	(Russia) Lokomotiv Kuban
Scoring by quarter: 18–17, 21–23, 24–13, 12–20
Pts: Schortsanitis 15; Rebs: Ingles 7 Asts: Ingles 6		Pts: Kalnietis 18; Rebs: Hendrix 9 Asts: Kalnietis 6

Nokia Arena, Tel Aviv
Attendance: 10,728
Referees: José Martín (ESP), Tolga Sahin (ITA), Sasa Maricic (SRB)

6 December 2013
20:30

Boxscore

Laboral Kutxa (Spain)	79–63	(Lithuania) Lietuvos Rytas
Scoring by quarter: 18–17, 12–21, 23–11, 26–14
Pts: Hamilton 17; Rebs: three players 5 Asts: Hodge, Heurtel 3		Pts: Songaila 14; Rebs: Palacios 5 Asts: Seibutis 3

Fernando Buesa Arena, Vitoria-Gasteiz
Attendance: 10,264
Referees: Sasa Pukl (SLO), Jakub Zamojski (POL), Petri Mantyla (FIN)

6 December 2013
20:30

Boxscore

Panathinaikos (Greece)	69–63	(Serbia) Crvena Zvezda Telekom
Scoring by quarter: 20–21, 17–13, 15–14, 17–15
Pts: Curry 16; Rebs: Lasme 6 Asts: Ukic 5		Pts: Nelson 16; Rebs: Marjanović 9 Asts: Nelson 5

O.A.C.A., Athens
Attendance: 14,000
Referees: Miguel Perez Perez (ESP), Nicola Maestre (FRA), Alexey Davydov (RUS)

=== Game 9 ===
12 December 2013
18:45

Boxscore

Crvena Zvezda Telekom (Serbia)	81–65	(Spain) Laboral Kutxa
Scoring by quarter: 25–6, 20–20, 16–25, 20–14
Pts: Blažič 24; Rebs: Marjanović 9 Asts: Nelson 4		Pts: Hodge 15; Rebs: Hamilton, Nocioni 6 Asts: three players 3

Kombank Arena, Belgrade
Attendance: 7,000
Referees: Robert Lottermoser (GER), Boris Shulga (UKR), Panagiotis Anastopoulos (GRE)

12 December 2013
20:45

Boxscore

Maccabi Tel Aviv (Israel)	78–71	(Lithuania) Lietuvos Rytas
Scoring by quarter: 11–19, 26–13, 24–19, 17–20
Pts: three players 14; Rebs: Ingles, Tyus 7 Asts: Rice 6		Pts: Dowdell 16; Rebs: Songaila 9 Asts: Seibutis 6

Nokia Arena, Tel Aviv
Attendance: 10,800
Referees: Matej Boltauzer (SLO), Antonio Conde (ESP), Carmelo Paternico (ITA)

13 December 2013
17:00

Boxscore

Lokomotiv Kuban (Russia)	63–82	(Greece) Panathinaikos
Scoring by quarter: 23–21, 7–25, 14–20, 19–16
Pts: Jasaitis 13; Rebs: Hendrix 6 Asts: Brown, Grigoryev 3		Pts: Fotsis, Ukić 17; Rebs: Fotsis 6 Asts: Diamantidis 7

Basket-Hall, Krasnodar
Attendance: 7,153
Referees: Luigi Lamonica (ITA), Eddie Viator (FRA), Murat Biricik (TUR)

=== Game 10 ===
19 December 2013
20:45

Boxscore

Panathinaikos (Greece)	55–68	(Israel) Maccabi Tel Aviv
Scoring by quarter: 14-23, 13-13, 8-22, 20-10
Pts: Lasme 16; Rebs: Bramos, Lasme 8 Asts: Diamantidis 9		Pts: Blu 13; Rebs: Tyus 7 Asts: Ohayon, Rice 4

O.A.C.A., Athens
Attendance: 8,500
Referees: Sasa Pukl (SLO), Srdan Dozai (CRO), Emilio Perez Pizarro (ESP)

20 December 2013
18:45

Boxscore

Lietuvos Rytas (Lithuania)	75–99	(Serbia) Crvena Zvezda Telekom
Scoring by quarter: 17-28, 13-23, 21-27, 24-21
Pts: Palacios 26; Rebs: Jelovac 7 Asts: Seibutis 4		Pts: Marjanović 25; Rebs: Marjanović 11; Asts: Jenkins 4

Siemens Arena, Vilnius
Attendance: 3,350
Referees: Recep Ankarali (TUR), Roberto Chiari (ITA), Oscar Perea (ESP)

20 December 2013
20:30

Boxscore

Laboral Kutxa (Spain)	84–71	(Russia) Lokomotiv Kuban
Scoring by quarter: 20-27, 21-20, 16-11, 27-13
Pts: Bjelica 15; Rebs: three players 5 Asts: Heurtel 4		Pts: Williams 19; Rebs: three players 5 Asts: Williams 4

Fernando Buesa Arena, Vitoria-Gasteiz
Attendance: 10,819
Referees: Milivoje Ovcic (SRB), Elias Koromilas (GRE), Rustu Nuran (TUR)
