= Charles Jenkins (basketball) =

American basketball player (born 1989)

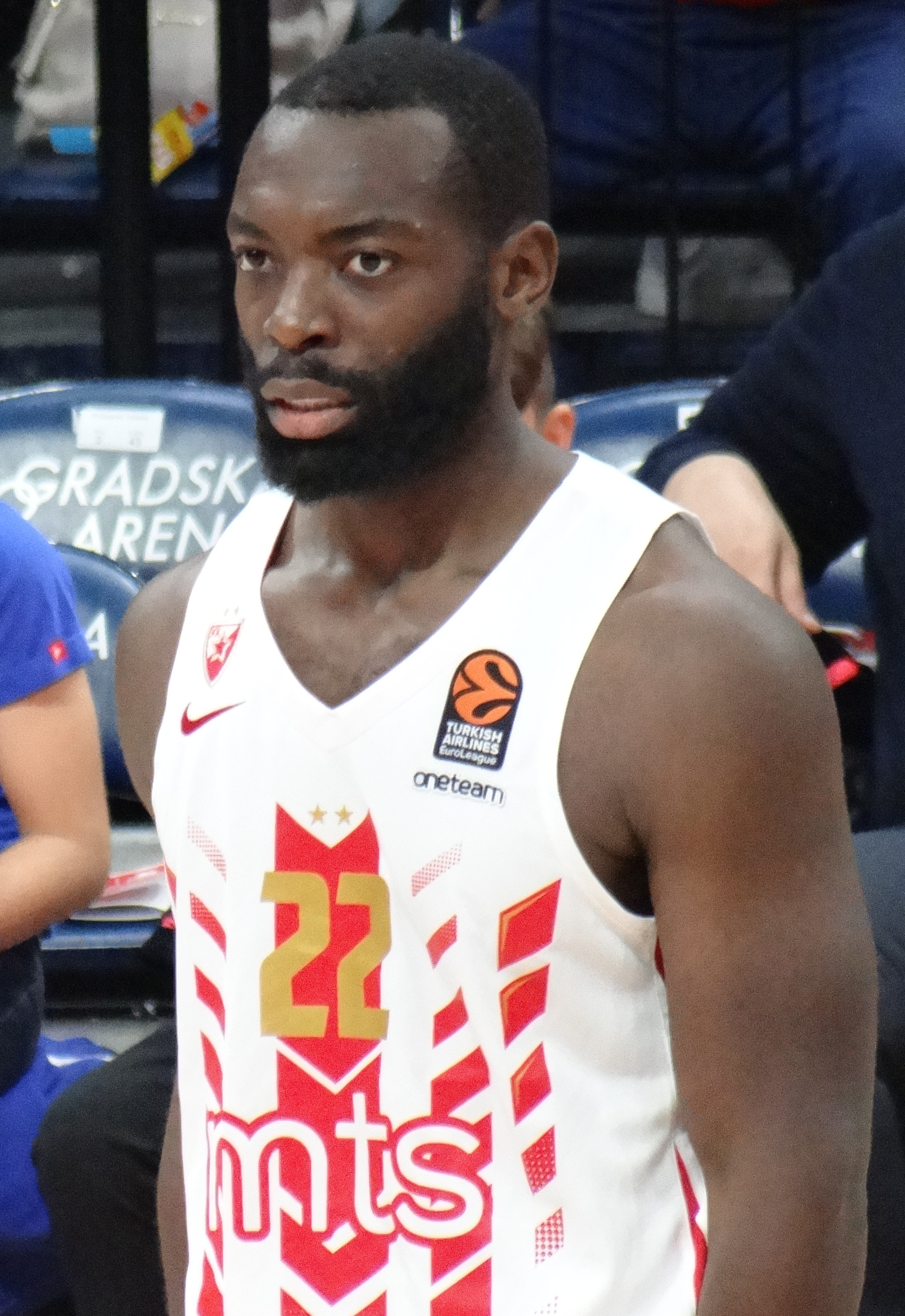
- Jenkins with Crvena zvezda in 2019

Personal information
- Born: February 28, 1989 (age 37) Brooklyn, New York, U.S.
- Listed height: 6 ft 3 in (1.91 m)
- Listed weight: 220 lb (100 kg)

Career information
- High school: Holy Cross (Queens, New York); Springfield Gardens (Queens, New York)
- College: Hofstra (2007–2011)
- NBA draft: 2011: 2nd round, 44th overall pick
- Drafted by: Golden State Warriors
- Playing career: 2011–2023
- Position: Shooting guard / point guard

Career history
- 2011–2013: Golden State Warriors
- 2013: Philadelphia 76ers
- 2013–2015: Crvena zvezda
- 2015–2016: Olimpia Milano
- 2016–2017: Crvena zvezda
- 2017–2019: Khimki
- 2019–2020: Crvena zvezda
- 2020–2021: Olympiacos
- 2021: Iberostar Tenerife
- 2022–2023: FMP

Career highlights
- 2× Adriatic League champion (2015, 2017); Adriatic League Finals MVP (2017); All-Adriatic League Team (2017); 2× Serbian League champion (2015, 2017); 3× Serbian Cup winner (2014, 2015, 2017); EuroLeague steals leader (2017); Italian League champion (2016); Italian Cup winner (2016); Third-team All-American – SN (2011); 3× Haggerty Award winner (2009–2011); Chip Hilton Player of the Year (2011); 2× CAA Player of the Year (2010, 2011); 3× First-team All-CAA (2009–2011); No. 22 retired by Hofstra Pride
- Stats at NBA.com
- Stats at Basketball Reference

Charles T. Jenkins (born February 28, 1989) is an American former professional basketball player. He was drafted by the Golden State Warriors in the 2011 NBA draft after finishing his four-year college career with the Hofstra Pride. In addition to being a citizen of the United States, Jenkins also has Serbian citizenship.

While attending Hempstead, New York's Hofstra University, Jenkins, a 6 ft 3 in (1.91 m) guard for the Hofstra Pride men's basketball team, had already amassed 1,767 points, 440 rebounds, 331 assists and 156 steals through his first three seasons. He is Hofstra's all-time leading scorer (2,463), breaking Antoine Agudio's record (2,286) set in 2007–08, and graduated as the second leading scorer in Colonial Athletic Association history behind Hall of Famer David Robinson, who scored 2,669 points at Navy. Jenkins had his jersey retired by Hofstra prior to his final home game of his senior season, making him the fourth player in school history to be so honored, and the first to have it retired while still active.

== Early life ==
Jenkins was born in Brooklyn, New York, where he lived in the Brownsville section for six years until moving to Rosedale, Queens.

The youngster took to basketball under the influence of two close family members: his father who had played collegiate ball for the Navy before transferring to Virginia Western Community College as well as his older brother who had played some high school basketball. Teenage Jenkins commuted to Holy Cross High School until transferring to Springfield Gardens High School, where he played high school basketball for three seasons. As a senior in 2005–06, he averaged 21.1 points, 7.2 assists and 5.1 rebounds en route to a New York Post selection to the All-New York City Team.

== College career ==
=== Freshman ===
After redshirting his true freshman season of 2006–07, Jenkins began competing for the Hofstra University Pride in 2007–08. He played in 29 games and averaged 15.0 points and 4.6 rebounds, led his team in free throw percentage (78.0), and finished 10th in the Colonial Athletic Association (CAA) in scoring (first among freshmen). Jenkins was named the CAA Rookie of the Year, Metropolitan New York Rookie of the Year and to the Third Team All-Metropolitan New York.

=== Sophomore ===
In 2008–09, Jenkins averaged 19.7 points and 4.8 rebounds in 32 games played. In the last game of the regular season against UNC Wilmington, he surpassed the 1,000-point milestone, joining Agudio as the only two sophomores to reach 1,000 points prior to their junior seasons. At the season's end, his 1,065 points stood 47 points more than Agudio's pace at the end of his respective sophomore season. Jenkins garnered numerous awards for his year. Among them was the coveted Haggerty Award, which is an award given annually to the greater New York Metropolitan area's best Division I men's basketball player. He became just the fifth sophomore overall (and first since Ron Artest in 1998–99) to earn it in the 73-year history of the award to that point.

=== Junior ===
As a junior in 2009–10, Jenkins once again increased most of his season averages. He scored 20.6 points, grabbed 4.5 rebounds, dished out 3.9 assists and shot 40.9% from three-point range. On November 30, 2009, in an 84–80 win versus Fairfield, he scored a career-high 38 points on 12-for-17 shooting and went 9-for-9 in free throw attempts. Although the Pride would finish the year with a 19–15 overall record, Jenkins' personal play was good enough to make him the Colonial Athletic Association Men's Basketball Player of the Year. Additionally, he became just the ninth repeat winner of the Haggerty Award.

=== Senior ===
Jenkins became just the third player all-time to win the Haggerty Award three times, joining Jim McMillian (Columbia, 1968–70) and Chris Mullin (St. John's, 1983–85), both of whom later achieved great success at the NBA and/or Olympic levels of competition.

== Professional career ==
=== NBA: Golden State Warriors ===
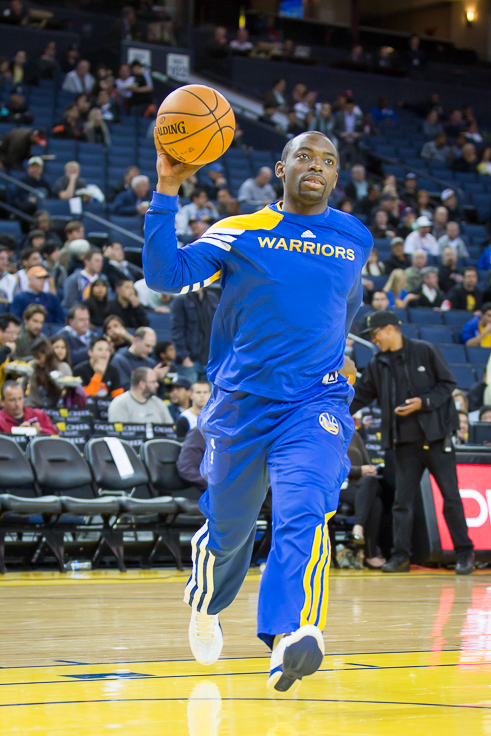
Jenkins with the Golden State Warriors in 2012

In the 2011 NBA draft, combo guard Jenkins was selected in the second round (44th overall) by the Golden State Warriors after the team had taken shooting guard Klay Thompson with their first-round pick (11th) earlier in the night. Due to the 2011 NBA lockout, Jenkins signed with the Italian team Teramo Basket of the Lega Basket Serie A on November 24, 2011. However, the lockout ended within two weeks and he left Teramo without playing any games for the club.

On December 9, 2011, he officially signed with the Warriors, coached by Mark Jackson. Twenty-two-year-old Jenkins made his NBA debut on December 25, 2011, in the Warriors' 2011–12 season opener against the Los Angeles Clippers. Briefly entering the contest, he finished with one assist in 1 minute of action. Settling into the role of fighting for the twenty-three-year-old starting point guard Steph Curry's backup minutes, rookie Jenkins ended up getting unexpected opportunities towards the end of the lockout-shortened season due to the third-year player Curry's persistent ankle injuries. Though the team had signed Nate Robinson early into the season to take most of Curry's point guard backup minutes, Jenkins would end up often starting in place of injured Curry. The rookie's minutes especially increased from March 2012, as Curry was ruled out for the rest of the season and Monta Ellis got traded. On March 24, 2012, Jenkins scored career-high 27 points in a 90–87 loss to the Portland Trail Blazers, continuing to post improved numbers until the end of the season and finishing with an average of 5.8 points and 3.3 assists in 51 games, 28 of them starts. The Warriors failed to make the playoffs; several days after their season ended, the team demoted their GM Larry Riley to a scouting position while simultaneously promoting the assistant general manager, former player agent Bob Myers, to be the new general manager.

Heading into his second season at Golden State, twenty-three-year-old Jenkins participated in the NBA Summer League in Las Vegas throughout July 2012. Playing alongside Warriors teammates such as rookie Harrison Barnes and fellow second-year player Klay Thompson, Jenkins had a good showing as the team won each of its five games with Jenkins the top scorer in two of them. Just before the Summer League, in anticipation of Robinson leaving, the team had signed point guard Jarrett Jack with the question of who would be Curry's primary backup in the upcoming season, Jack or Jenkins, initially left open.

Once the season began, Jenkins saw his role on the team diminished severely, getting very little playing time with Curry back healthy and newly-acquired Jack getting most of the backup minutes. On February 21, 2013, Jenkins was traded to the Philadelphia 76ers for a second-round draft pick.

=== Philadelphia 76ers ===
Joining the struggling Sixers, a team well out of the playoff spots and on the verge of tanking for a better draft position, Jenkins was again relegated to the bench, getting sporadic minutes way down in the pecking order behind guards preferred by head coach Doug Collins such as Jrue Holiday, Evan Turner, Nick Young, Damien Wilkins, and even the newly-acquired Justin Holiday who joined several weeks after Jenkins.

At the end of the season, with no firm NBA offers other than several training camp invitations, Jenkins began considering Europe as an option via instructing his agent to pursue those opportunities as well, revealing in later interviews he first got alerted to professional basketball outside the U.S. by fellow Philadelphia benchwarmer Jeremy Pargo who had explained the European club basketball system to him during one of their Sixers team flights while offering personal advice "not to settle for an NBA journeyman career since there is life in European basketball".

=== Moving to Europe: KK Crvena zvezda ===
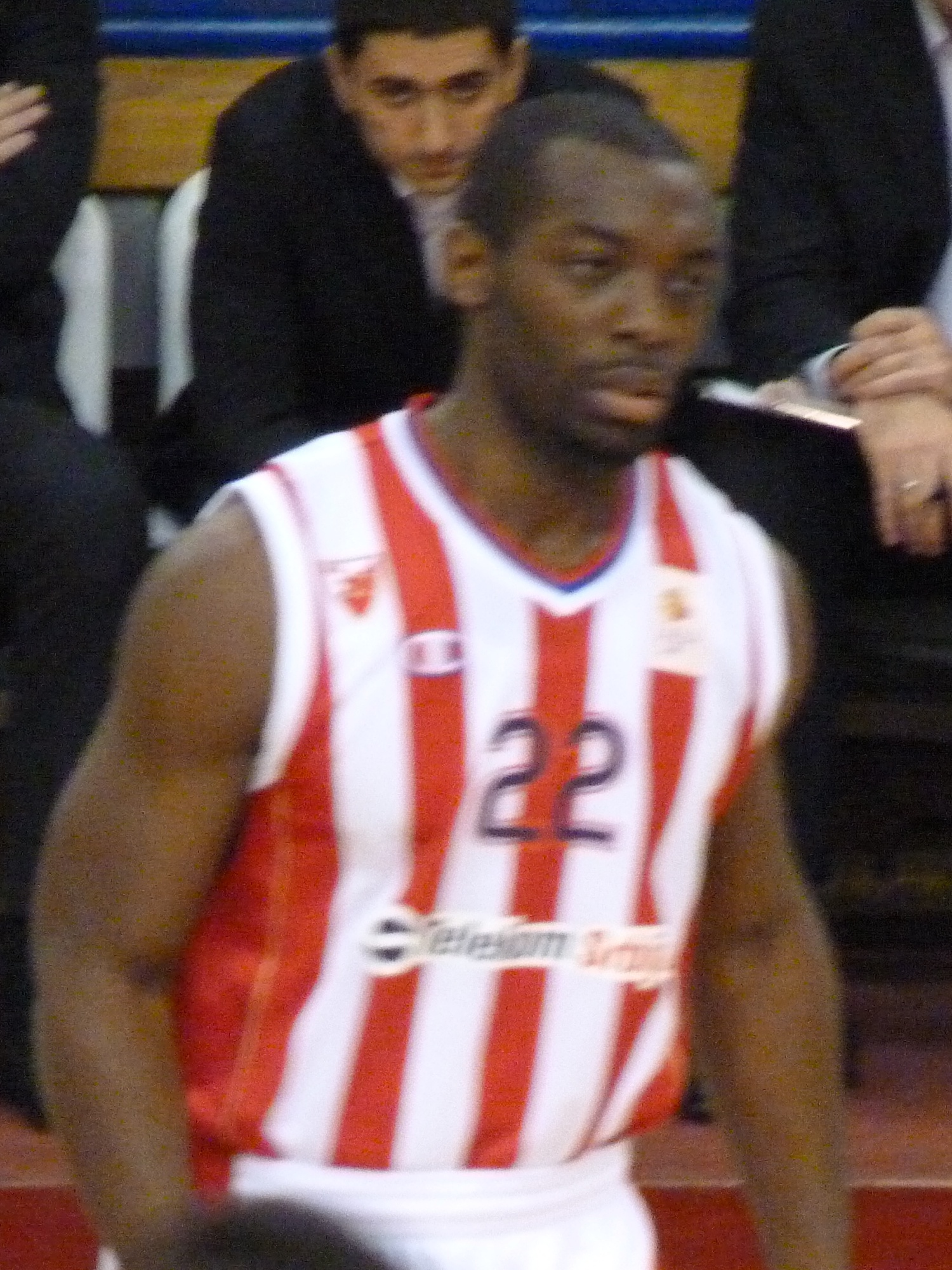
Jenkins with Crvena zvezda in December 2013

On July 30, 2013, following interest from Maccabi Tel Aviv and Olimpia Milano, Jenkins signed a one-year contract with the Serbian team Crvena zvezda, citing its superior financial offer as his main consideration due to having no specific knowledge of any European clubs. Joining the squad coached by Dejan Radonjić, Jenkins came in alongside a number of acquisitions—including center Boban Marjanović, coveted small forward Blake Schilb, shooting guard Jaka Blažič, and power forward Ivan Radenović—as the Adriatic League runner-up looked to reinforce on all positions ahead of its return to Euroleague after 14 years as well as continuation of the chase for its first Adriatic League title domestically. With experienced returning players—point guard DeMarcus Nelson in his second season with the team, small forward Marko Simonović, and center Raško Katić—newly-acquired Schilb, coming off a great Euroleague season with Élan Chalon and signed to a 3-year contract, was projected to lead the team in Euroleague.

With Schilb as the focal point of coach Radonjić's setup initially, Jenkins was mostly coming off the bench while sharing minutes at the two position with Blažič along with occasionally backing up compatriot Nelson at point guard. Drawn in a Euroleague group with Lokomotiv Kuban, Maccabi Tel Aviv, Panathinaikos, Baskonia, and Lietuvos rytas, Zvezda failed to progress to the Top 16 Euroleague stage with a 4–6 record that was nevertheless good enough to continue the European season in the second-tier Eurocup's Last 32 stage. With Schilb's suddenly increasingly peripheral role in the team due to not fitting in coach Radonjić's plans all of which eventually led to the player being left off the squad in mid January 2014 and the two sides agreeing a negotiated settlement to break off the 3-year deal after only 6 months, Jenkins saw his minutes increase, scoring team-high 16 points in a Eurocup home win versus Bilbao. Not long afterwards, by mid-to-late January 2014, he accepted the offer of extending his contract with Crvena zvezda for an additional year with an opt-out clause in the summer transfer window should he receive an NBA offer.

In 2014–15 season, Crvena zvezda won the Adriatic League championship, the Serbian League championship and the Radivoj Korać Cup.

=== Seasons in Europe ===
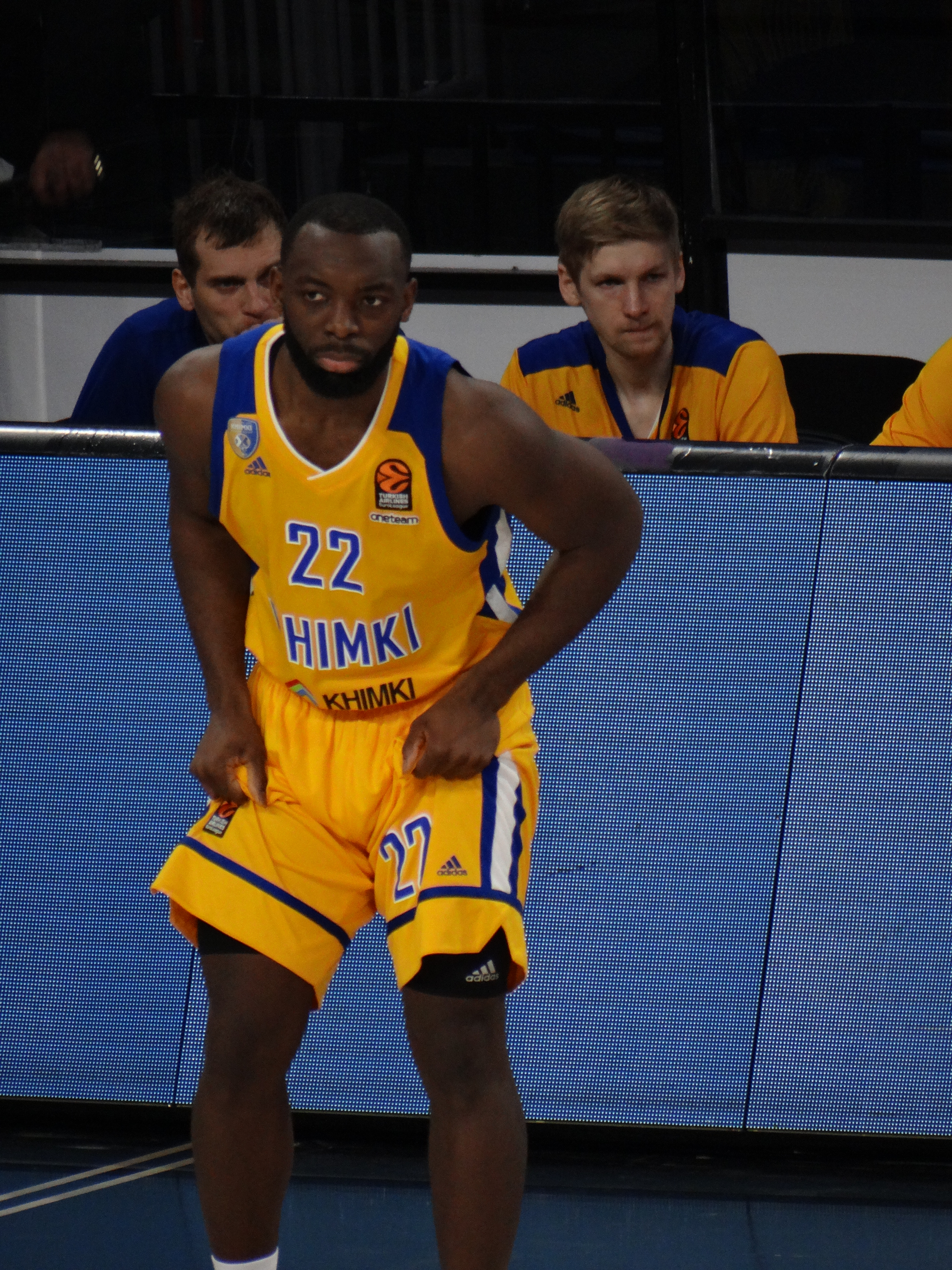
Jenkins with Khimki in 2018

On July 8, 2015, Jenkins signed with Italian club Emporio Armani Milano for the 2015–16 season.

On July 15, 2016, Jenkins returned to Crvena zvezda, signing a two-year deal. In 2016–17, he led the EuroLeague in steals, with 2.1 per game. Jenkins was also named 2017 ABA League Playoffs MVP, where he averaged 12.3 points, 5.3 assists, 3 rebounds, 1.5 steals and average PIR of 15.2.

On June 29, 2017, Jenkins signed a two-year deal with Russian club Khimki. Jenkins played for HBC Sicklerville in the 2018 edition of The Basketball Tournament. He scored 3 points and had 2 rebounds in the team's first-round loss to the Talladega Knights. In the 2018–19 EuroLeague season, he averaged 6.9 points on 42.0% three-point shooting, 2.8 rebounds and 1.0 steal per game over 29 games.

On July 5, 2019, Jenkins signed a two-year deal for Crvena zvezda. It is his third stint with the Zvezda.

On June 20, 2020, Jenkins signed a contract with Greek club Olympiacos of the EuroLeague.

== Personal life ==
Jenkins has one brother and one sister. He cites Dwayne Washington as his favorite athlete, and prior to selecting Hofstra he had also been recruited by St. John's and Liberty.

== Career statistics ==
Legend
GP	Games played	GS	Games started	MPG	Minutes per game
FG%	Field-goal percentage	3P%	3-point field-goal percentage	FT%	Free-throw percentage
RPG	Rebounds per game	APG	Assists per game	SPG	Steals per game
BPG	Blocks per game	PPG	Points per game	PIR	Performance index rating
**Bold**	Career high

=== NBA ===
==== Regular season ====
Year	Team	GP	GS	MPG	FG%	3P%	FT%	RPG	APG	SPG	BPG	PPG
2011–12	Golden State	**51**	**28**	**17.5**	**.447**	.150	**.872**	**1.3**	**3.3**	**.6**	**.1**	**5.8**
2012–13	Golden State	47	0	6.2	.422	**.500**	.556	.4	.6	.2	.0	1.7
2012–13	Philadelphia	12	1	12.5	.368	.000	.500	.9	1.3	.5	**.1**	2.5
Career		110	29	12.1	.434	.182	.754	.9	1.9	.4	.1	3.7

=== EuroLeague ===
*	Led the league

Year	Team	GP	GS	MPG	FG%	3P%	FT%	RPG	APG	SPG	BPG	PPG	PIR
2013–14	Crvena zvezda	10	0	22.8	.436	.565	.765	1.3	1.7	1.9	**.2**	**9.4**	5.9
2014–15	Crvena zvezda	24	4	19.1	.356	.310	.800	1.3	1.3	.9	**.2**	6.6	3.7
2015–16	Milano	10	8	**26.1**	.472	**.583**	.500	1.6	1.8	1.5	—	6.7	5.6
2016–17	Crvena zvezda	30	**29**	**26.1**	.444	.425	.848	1.9	**2.7**	**2.1***	.1	**9.4**	**9.5**
2017–18	Khimki	**34**	22	21.4	.455	.451	.769	1.7	1.7	.9	.1	5.5	4.4
2018–19	Khimki	29	25	24.4	.490	.420	.828	**2.8**	1.2	1.0	**.2**	6.9	7.1
2019–20	Crvena zvezda	23	0	18.7	.366	.074	**.941**	2.2	1.8	.8	.2	3.4	3.4
2020–21	Olympiacos	34	21	15.9	**.535**	.425	.667	1.2	.9	.8	.0	2.9	2.2
Career		194	109	21.3	.438	.407	.808	1.8	1.6	1.2	.1	6.0	5.1

== See also ==
- List of KK Crvena zvezda players with 100 games played
