= Eurocup Basketball 2013–14 Last 32 Group L =

Standings and Results for Group L of the Last 32 phase of the 2013–14 Eurocup basketball tournament.

== Standings ==
	Team	Pld	W	L	PF	PA	Diff	Tie-break
1.	(Russia) Nizhny Novgorod	6	5	1	468	436	+32	
2.	(Serbia) Crvena zvezda	6	4	2	501	462	+39	
3.	(Spain) Bilbao Basket	6	3	3	494	471	+23	
4.	(Greece) Panionios	6	0	6	418	512	–94	

== Fixtures and results ==
=== Game 1 ===
8 January 2014
18:00

Boxscore

Panionios (Greece)	75–89	(Russia) Nizhny Novgorod
Scoring by quarter: 17–24, 25–23, 17–16, 16–26
Pts: McCollum 31; Rebs: Milbourne 8 Asts: McCollum 3		Pts: Babbitt, Thompson 17; Rebs: Antonov, Thompson 8 Asts: Khvostov 6

Hellinicon Olympic Arena, Nea Smyrni
Attendance: 600
Referees: Nicola Maestre (FRA), Gianluca Mattioli (ITA), Haris Bijedic (BIH)

8 January 2014
19:15

Boxscore

Crvena zvezda (Serbia)	105–87	(Spain) Bilbao Basket
Scoring by quarter: 28–24, 22–22, 33–21, 22–20
Pts: Jenkins 16; Rebs: Marjanović 12; Asts: Nelson 6		Pts: Bertāns 14; Rebs: Kavaliauskas 4 Asts: Mumbrú 6

Pionir Hall, Belgrade
Attendance: 7,100
Referees: Grzegorz Ziemblicki (POL), Murat Biricik (TUR), Ioannis Foufis (GRE)

=== Game 2 ===
14 January 2014
20:30

Boxscore

Bilbao Basket (Spain)	93–62	(Greece) Panionios
Scoring by quarter: 21–19, 19–11, 29–9, 24–23
Pts: Grimau 18; Rebs: López 7 Asts: López 5		Pts: McCollum 28; Rebs: Batis 6 Asts: Batis, McCollum 2

Bilbao Arena, Bilbao
Attendance: 4,583
Referees: Paolo Taurino (ITA), Regis Bardera (FRA), Saverio Lanzarini (ITA)

15 January 2014
16:40

Nizhny Novgorod (Russia)	86–75	(Serbia) Crvena zvezda
Scoring by quarter: 20–20, 20–22, 22–14, 24–19
Pts: Babbitt 25; Rebs: Thompson 13; Asts: Thompson 5		Pts: Nelson 22; Rebs: Nelson, Radenović 6 Asts: Nelson 4

Trade Union Sport Palace, Nizhny Novgorod
Attendance: 2,100
Referees: Fernando Rocha (POR), Seffi Shemmesh (ISR), Ingus Baumanis (LAT)

=== Game 3 ===
22 January 2014
19:15

Boxscore

Crvena zvezda (Serbia)	84–64	(Greece) Panionios
Scoring by quarter: 16–19, 23–16, 22–12, 23–17
Pts: Simonović 18; Rebs: Marjanović 11; Asts: Nelson 11		Pts: McCollum 11; Rebs: McCollum 6 Asts: Duvnjak 4

Pionir Hall, Belgrade
Attendance: 4,934
Referees: Boris Shulga (UKR), Gentian Cici (ALB), Carlos Peruga (ESP)

22 January 2014
20:30

Boxscore

Bilbao Basket (Spain)	80–54	(Russia) Nizhny Novgorod
Scoring by quarter: 18–10, 25–12, 17–16, 20–16
Pts: Mumbrú 20; Rebs: Hervelle 13; Asts: Mumbrú 5		Pts: Rochestie 19; Rebs: Antonov 6 Asts: Khvostov, Rochestie 3

Bilbao Arena, Bilbao
Attendance: 4,781
Referees: Luigi Lamonica (ITA), Igor Dragojevic (MNE), Saso Petek (SLO)

=== Game 4 ===
29 January 2014
16:40

Boxscore

Nizhny Novgorod (Russia)	81–65	(Spain) Bilbao Basket
Scoring by quarter: 18–11, 25–15, 25–22, 13–17
Pts: Rochestie 18; Rebs: Antonov 8 Asts: Rochestie 6		Pts: Gabriel 12; Rebs: Markota 7 Asts: López 5

Trade Union Sport Palace, Nizhny Novgorod
Attendance: 1,500
Referees: Milivoje Jovcic (SRB), Boris Shulga (UKR), Markos Michaelides (SUI)

29 January 2014
18:00

Boxscore

Panionios (Greece)	66–78	(Serbia) Crvena zvezda
Scoring by quarter: 21–19, 19–21, 12–14, 14–24
Pts: McCollum, Carter 15; Rebs: Milbourne 6 Asts: McCollum, Batis 3		Pts: Katić 19; Rebs: Three players 5 Asts: Jenkins 7

Hellinicon Olympic Arena, Nea Smyrni
Attendance: 700
Referees: Luis Lopes (POR), Robert Vyklicky (CZE), David Romano (ISR)

=== Game 5 ===
12 February 2014
16:40

Boxscore

Nizhny Novgorod (Russia)	80–67	(Greece) Panionios
Scoring by quarter: 24–13, 19–22, 14–15, 23–17
Pts: Thompson 19; Rebs: Thompson 11; Asts: Khvostov 6		Pts: McCollum 22; Rebs: Skordilis, Kyritsis 4 Asts: Four players 2

Trade Union Sport Palace, Nizhny Novgorod
Attendance: 1,700
Referees: Rustu Nuran (TUR), Sinisa Herceg (CRO), Piotr Pastusiak (POL)

12 February 2014
20:30

Boxscore

Bilbao Basket (Spain)	81–85	(Serbia) Crvena zvezda
Scoring by quarter: 17–25, 20–12, 20–23, 24–25
Pts: Mumbrú 18; Rebs: Three players 6 Asts: Three players 2		Pts: Blažič 20; Rebs: Dragićević 7 Asts: Nelson 6

Bilbao Arena, Bilbao
Attendance: 6,129
Referees: Tolga Sahin (ITA), Roberto Chiari (ITA), Petri Mantyla (FIN)

=== Game 6 ===
19 February 2014
18:00

Boxscore

Panionios (Greece)	84–88	(Spain) Bilbao Basket
Scoring by quarter: 14–22, 25–24, 18–22, 27–20
Pts: Langford 17; Rebs: Saloustros 5 Asts: Duvnjak 6		Pts: Kavaliauskas 13; Rebs: Kavaliauskas 6 Asts: Bertāns 5

Hellinicon Olympic Arena, Nea Smyrni
Attendance: 300
Referees: Seffi Shemmesh (ISR), radomir Vojinovic (MNE), Marko Juras (SRB)

19 February 2014
19:15

Boxscore

Crvena zvezda (Serbia)	74–78	(Russia) Nizhny Novgorod
Scoring by quarter: 16–23, 25–17, 17–15, 16–23
Pts: Jenkins 25; Rebs: 3 players 5 Asts: Katić 4		Pts: Antonov 20; Rebs: 3 players 4 Asts: Rochestie 7

Pionir Hall, Belgrade
Attendance: 3,994
Referees: Paolo Taurino (ITA), Panagiotis Anastopoulos (GRE), Ingus Baumanis (LAT)
