= Jean-Christophe Prat =

French basketball coach

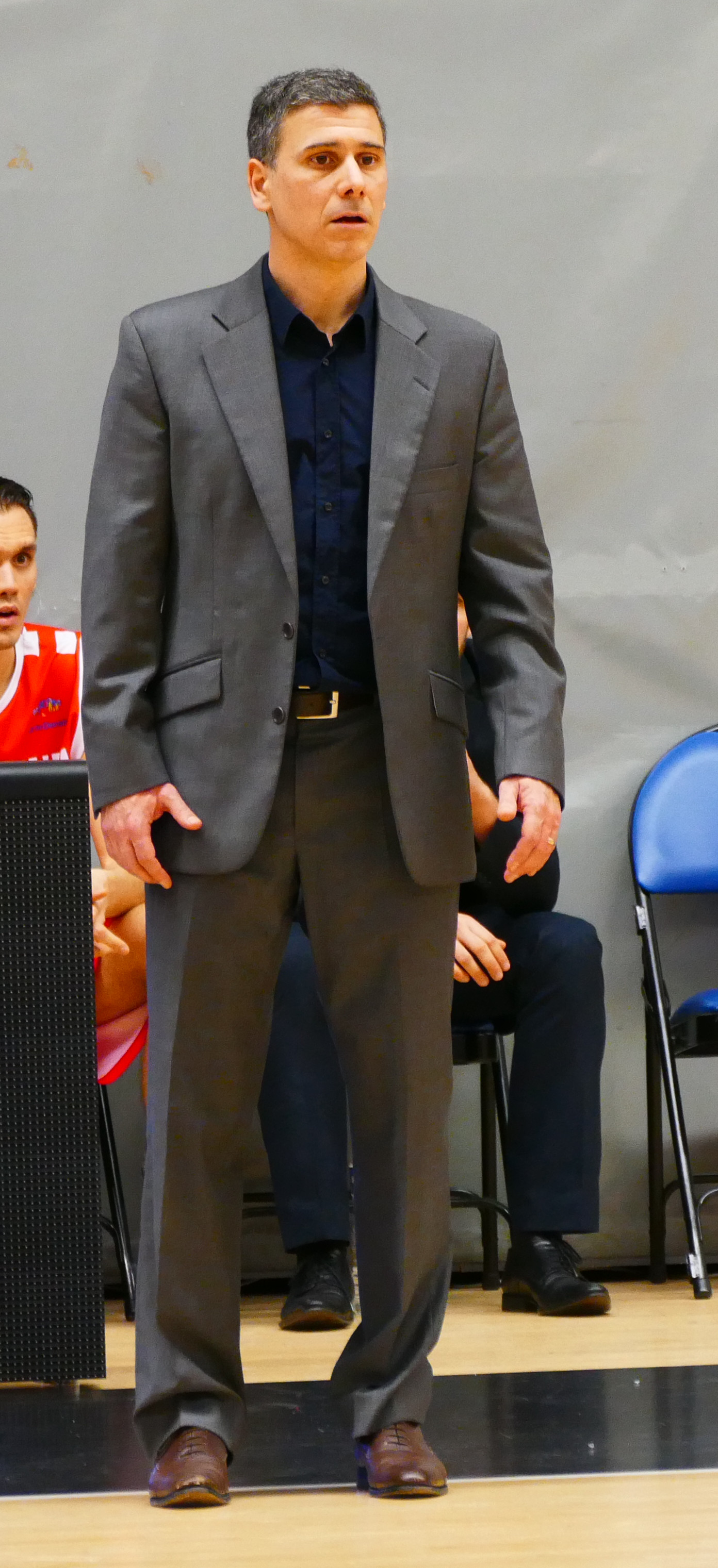

BCM Gravelines-Dunkerque
- Position: Head coach
- League: LNB Élite

Personal information
- Born: 1972 (age 53–54) Paris, France
- Coaching career: 2003–present

Career history

Coaching
- 2003-2006: ASVEL Basket (assistant)
- 2006-2012: Orleans Loiret Basket (assistant)
- 2012-2014: Beşiktaş Istanbul (assistant)
- 2014-2017: Denain ASC Voltaire
- 2018-2022: Paris Basketball
- 2023: ASVEL Basket (assistant)
- 2023-present: BCM Gravelines

Jean-Christophe Prat is a French professional basketball coach who serves as the head coach for BCM Gravelines Dunkerque of the French LNB Elite league.

== Coaching career ==
From 2003 to 2006, Prat was an assistant coach with ASVEL Basket.

From 2006 to 2012, Prat was an assistant coach with Orléans Loiret Basket.

For two years from 2012 to 2014, Prat was an assistant coach with Beşiktaş Istanbul.

In May 2014, Prat was named as head coach of Denain Voltaire Basket. Prat left Denain in 2017.

In 2018, Prat became the head coach of Paris Basketball and led the team for four seasons until 2022, coaching 154 games.

In June 2023, Prat was named an assistant coach with ASVEL Basket.

On October 27, 2023, Prat was named as head coach of BCM Gravelines Dunkerque. He previously coached at ASVEL, Orléans, Besiktas Istanbul, Denain, and Paris Basketball. He began his coaching career in 2003.
