= Elio Sadiku =

Kosovan basketball player

Bandol
- Position: Guard

Personal information
- Born: 18 April 1991 (age 35) Gjilan, Yugoslavia
- Listed height: 6 ft 2 in (1.88 m)
- Listed weight: 238 lb (108 kg)

Career history
- 2007–2009: Saint-Étienne
- 2009–2010: Orléans Loiret
- 2010–2011: Lucentum Alicante
- 2011–2014: Saint-Chamond
- 2014–2015: GET Vosges
- 2015–2017: Cognac
- 2017–2018: SVBD
- 2018–2022: HTV Basket
- 2022–2023: Ail de Rousset
- 2023–present: Bandol

Career highlights
- French Cup winner (2010)

Elio Sadiku (born 18 April 1991) is a Kosovan-born French professional basketball player.

== Career ==
He was born in 1991 in Gjilan to ethnic Albanians parents. He started his professional career with Saint-Étienne in 2007. In 2009, Sadiku signed for Orléans Loiret of the LNB Élite and EuroLeague.

== EuroLeague career statistics ==
Legend
GP	Games played	GS	Games started	MPG	Minutes per game
FG%	Field-goal percentage	3P%	3-point field-goal percentage	FT%	Free-throw percentage
RPG	Rebounds per game	APG	Assists per game	SPG	Steals per game
BPG	Blocks per game	PPG	Points per game	PIR	Performance index rating
**Bold**	Career high

Year	Team	GP	GS	MPG	FG%	3P%	FT%	RPG	APG	SPG	BPG	PPG	PIR
2009–10	Orléans Loiret	2	0	1.46	1	1	0	1	1	0	0	11.5	1.5
Career		2	0	1.46	1	1	0	1	1	0	0	11.5	1.5
