= J. R. Reynolds =

American basketball player (born 1984)

Queens Royals
- Position: Assistant coach
- League: Atlantic Sun Conference

Personal information
- Born: May 9, 1984 (age 42) Roanoke, Virginia, U.S.
- Listed height: 6 ft 2 in (1.88 m)
- Listed weight: 198 lb (90 kg)

Career information
- High school: Oak Hill Academy (Mouth of Wilson, Virginia)
- College: Virginia (2003–2007)
- NBA draft: 2007: undrafted
- Playing career: 2007–2021
- Coaching career: 2021–present

Career history

Playing
- 2007–2008: Triboldi Soresina
- 2008–2009: ASVEL Basket
- 2009: NSB Napoli
- 2009–2010: Cimberio Varese
- 2010–2011: Orléans Loiret Basket
- 2011: Maine Red Claws
- 2011–2012: BCM Gravelines
- 2012–2013: Bnei HaSharon
- 2013: BCM Gravelines
- 2013–2014: Limoges CSP
- 2014–2015: Budućnost Podgorica
- 2015: Stelmet Zielona Góra
- 2016: Torku Konyaspor
- 2016–2017: Budućnost Podgorica
- 2017–2018: BCM Gravelines
- 2019–2020: Poitiers

Coaching
- 2021-2022: DME Academy
- 2022-2023: Maine Celtics (assistant)
- 2023-present: Queens (assistant)

Career highlights
- 2× French League champion (2009, 2014); 2× Montenegrin League champion (2015, 2017); 2× Montenegrin Cup winner (2015, 2017); Second-team All-ACC (2007); Third-team All-ACC (2006); Virginia Mr. Basketball (2003)

James Richard "J. R." Reynolds (born May 9, 1984) is an American basketball coach and former player who is currently an assistant coach at Queens University of Charlotte.

== High school and college ==
Reynolds was born in Roanoke, Virginia to parents Laverne Alexander and Warren Reynolds. He has one sister.

His main position in high school was shooting guard but he learned to be a point guard in college. Reynolds attended Roanoke Catholic High School from 1999 to 2002. There he played on the basketball team, and played on three state-championship teams during those four years.

He transferred to Oak Hill Academy for his senior season in 2002–03. He played on the Oak Hill basketball team, which was ranked number 4 in the United States in 2003.

Reynolds played college basketball for the University of Virginia from 2003 to 2007. He was a top player there, and was among the top-ten scorers in program history.

== Professional career ==
He has played for Martos Napoil in Italy, ASVEL in France, and Vanoli Soresina in Italy.

He played 3 games for the Maine Red Claws in the 2011–12 season.

In December 2012, he signed for Bnei HaSharon of the Israeli Basketball Super League. For the 2013–14 season, Reynolds signed with Limoges CSP in the French LNB.

On August 6, 2014, he signed a one-year deal with Budućnost Podgorica of Montenegro.

On July 27, 2015, he signed a one-year deal with the Polish club Stelmet Zielona Góra. In late December 2015, he left Zielona Góra and signed with Torku Konyaspor for the rest of the season.

On July 6, 2016, Reynolds returned to Budućnost Podgorica, signing a one-year deal.

On October 17, 2017, Reynolds signed with BCM Gravelines, returning to the club for a second stint.

== Coaching career ==
After his playing career ended, Reynolds spent one season as the head coach of the boys basketball team at the DME Academy in Daytona Beach, Florida. He then spent a season as an assistant coach for the Maine Celtics before accepting a position as an assistant coach at Queens University of Charlotte in 2023.

== Career statistics ==
Season	Team	League	GP	MPG	FG%	3P%	FT%	RPG	APG	SPG	BPG	PPG
2007-08	Vanoli Soresina	Legadue	30	32.4	.516	.404	.809	3.5	3.2	2.3	.1	17.7
2008-09	ASVEL Basket	LNB Pro A	36	25.7	.507	.404	.765	2.3	3.9	.9	.0	10.8
2009-10	Cimberio Varese	Lega A	13	17.1	.353	.385	.682	1.5	1.8	1.2	.0	5.3
2010-11	Entente Orléanaise	LNB Pro A	27	27.5	.486	.376	.768	2.4	3.6	1.0	.1	11.5
2011-12	Maine Red Claws	D-League	3	35.7	.333	.417	.900	4.3	2.0	1.7	.0	12.0
2011-12	BCM Gravelines	LNB Pro A	22	19.6	.345	.393	.867	2.0	1.6	.6	.0	8.0
2012-13	BCM Gravelines	LNB Pro A	2	7.5	--	.000	--	.5	.5	.0	.0	.0
2012-13	Bnei Herzliya	Ligat HaAl	15	29.8	.324	.485	.833	2.5	3.6	.9	.1	12.0
2013-14	CSP Limoges	LNB Pro A	39	27.0	.571	.250	.628	6.1	2.3	1.1	.5	7.7
2014-15	KK Budućnost	First Erste League	8	18.5	.500	.435	.889	2.6	3.1	1.3	.0	8.0
2014-15	KK Budućnost	Adriatic League	28	25.1	.508	.400	.832	2.6	4.0	1.4	.0	13.1
