= Rudy Jomby =

French basketball player

No. 6 – Cholet Basket
- Position: Small forward
- League: LNB Pro A

Personal information
- Born: May 21, 1988 (age 38) La Roche sur Yon, France
- Listed height: 6 ft 6 in (1.98 m)
- Listed weight: 218 lb (99 kg)

Career information
- Playing career: 2006–present

Career history
- 2006–2010: STB Le Havre
- 2010–2012: BCM Gravelines
- 2012–present: Cholet Basket

Rudy Jomby (born May 21, 1988) is a French professional basketball player who currently plays for Cholet Basket of the LNB Pro A.

== Career ==
Jomby played for the Youth squad of STB Le Havre from 2005 till 2008 when he signed his first professional contract with the same club and made his debut in the 2008-09 LNB season. In 2010, he signed with BCM Gravelines where he joined his former coach at Le Havre, Christian Monschau. With Gravelines, Rudy Jomby wins one Semaine des As title in 2011 and finishes first of the 2011-12 regular season. In 2012, he signs a three years contract with Cholet Basket where he joins his former youth team coach at Le Havre, Jean-Manuel Sousa.

He could have tried to go for the NBA DRAFT but he and his agent decided to take his name off the list a month before the lottery.

== Awards ==
- Won the 2011 Semaine des As tournament with BCM Gravelines
- Youth French league champion in 2006-07 and 2007-08 seasons
