= Zach Moss =

American basketball player (born 1981)

Zach Marquis Moss, known as Zach Moss, born on July 14, 1981, in Pompano Beach, Florida, is an American professional basketball player playing at the center position. Unselected in the 2004 NBA draft, he moved to Europe for his professional career, playing mainly in France.
