= Taqwa Pinero =

American basketball player (born 1983)

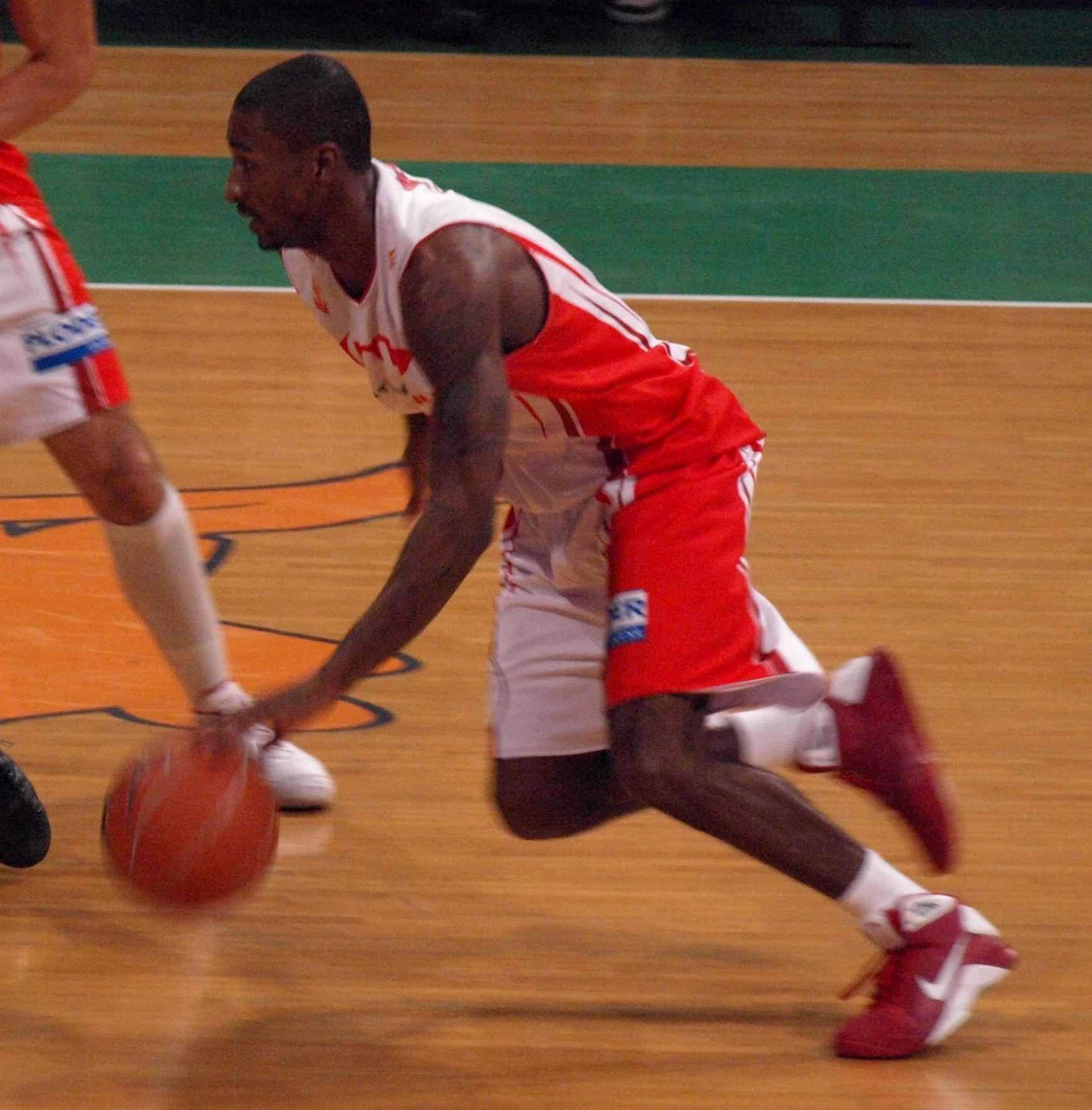
- Pinero, playing for Murcia in 2009

Personal information
- Born: August 6, 1983 (age 43) Red Bank, New Jersey
- Listed height: 6 ft 4 in (1.93 m)
- Listed weight: 198 lb (90 kg)

Career information
- High school: Neptune (Neptune Township, New Jersey)
- College: Louisville (2002–2006)
- NBA draft: 2006: undrafted
- Playing career: 2006–2020
- Position: Shooting guard

Career history
- 2006–2007: Pallacanestro Biella
- 2007: Dynamo Moscow
- 2007–2008: Junior Casale Monferrato
- 2008–2009: Murcia
- 2009–2010: Unicaja Málaga
- 2010: Baskonia
- 2010: Kavala
- 2010–2012: Scandone Avellino
- 2012: Valencia
- 2012: Aliağa Petkim
- 2012–2014: Scandone Avellino
- 2014–2015: San Sebastián Gipuzkoa
- 2015: Mahram Tehran
- 2015–2016: Socar Petkim
- 2016: San Sebastián Gipuzkoa
- 2016: Hoops Club
- 2016–2017: Iberostar Tenerife
- 2017–2019: Élan Béarnais Pau-Lacq-Orthez
- 2019-2020: Boulazac Basket Dordogne

Career highlights
- Conference USA tournament MVP (2005)

Taqwa Pinero (born Taquan Dean on August 6, 1983) is an American former professional basketball player.

== Amateur career ==
He was born in Red Bank, New Jersey and attended Neptune High School in Neptune Township, New Jersey.

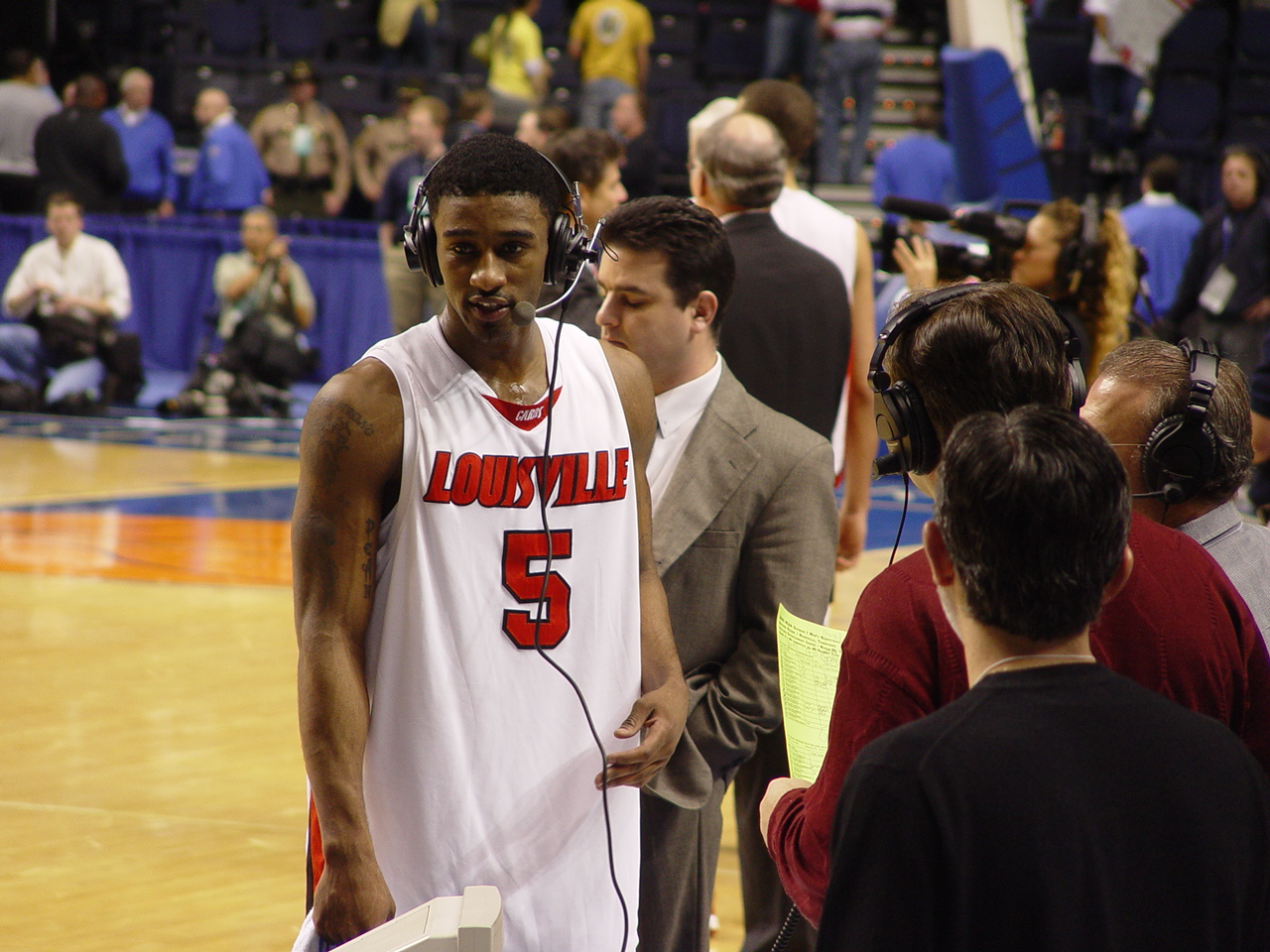
Dean during the 2005 NCAA tournament

Dean was a star college basketball player for the University of Louisville through 2006, where he majored in justice administration. Throughout his four-year college career, he scored 1,657 career points, and made 361 three-point field goals. After helping lead Louisville to the 2005 Final Four as a junior, he decided to stay for his senior season, finishing his career as the school's career leader in three-point field goals made.

== Professional career ==
He went undrafted in the 2006 NBA draft, and signed with Angelico Biella of the Italian League. Midway through the season, he transferred to the Russian Super League club Dynamo Moscow. In 2007, he signed with the Italian 2nd Division team Junior Casale Monferrato.

In July 2008, Dean played for the Phoenix Suns in the Las Vegas NBA Summer League. That same year, he signed with the Spanish Liga ACB club Murcia.

In 2009, he joined the Euroleague club Unicaja Málaga of Spain by signing a one-year contract. He moved for a short time to Saski Baskonia before finishing the 2009–10 season with Greek Kavala B.C. He then signed with Italian club Air Avellino for the 2010–11 season.

In August 2014, he signed with Spanish club San Sebastián Gipuzkoa. On April 9, 2015, he left San Sebastián, On and on April 27, he signed with Mahram Tehran of the Iranian Super League.

On July 11, 2015, Dean signed with Socar Petkim of the Turkish Basketball Second League. On April 19, 2016, he signed with his former team San Sebastián Gipuzkoa for the rest of the season.

On October 10, 2016, after legally changing his name to Taqwa Pinero, he signed with Hoops Club of the Lebanese Basketball League.

Two months later, Pinero signed with Spanish team Iberostar Tenerife. In February 2017, Pinero left the team. Later that month, he signed with French club Élan Béarnais Pau-Lacq-Orthez for the rest of the 2016–17 Pro A season. On June 2, 2017, he signed a two-year contract extension with Pau-Orthez. He officially retired as a player in 2023.

== Personal life ==
In October 2016, he changed his name from Taquan Dean to Taqwa Pinero, after a DNA test uncovered that the man he knew as his father was not his biological father. He also converted to Islam, taking an Arabic given name.
