= Ludovic Vaty =

French basketball player and coach (1988–2023)

Personal information
- Born: 21 November 1988 Les Abymes, Guadeloupe, France
- Died: 1 September 2023 (aged 34) Toulouse, France
- Listed height: 6 ft 9 in (2.06 m)
- Listed weight: 242 lb (110 kg)

Career information
- NBA draft: 2009: undrafted
- Playing career: 2006–2023
- Position: Power forward / centre

Career history

Playing
- 2002–2003: Point-à-Pitre
- 2003–2006: Centre Fédéral de Basket-ball
- 2006–2009: Pau-Orthez
- 2009–2011: Orléans
- 2011–2013: Gravelines Dunkerque
- 2016–2018: Tarbes-Lourdes
- 2018–2019: Bordeaux
- 2019–2020: Coteaux de Luy
- 2021–2023: TOAC Basket

Coaching
- 2014: France U-18 (assistant)

Ludovic Vaty (21 November 1988 – 1 September 2023) was a French basketball player and coach. He played nine games for the French national team. In May 2013, he was forced to retire early due to a heart condition, but later returned to playing amateur basketball.

== Biography ==
Born in Les Abymes on 21 November 1988, Vaty began playing youth basketball in his hometown before being recruited by Onestas Patrick Shanny at the age of 11. He began playing in Guadeloupe's regional basketball league. He joined Point-à-Pitre's basketball team in 2002. He moved to Metropolitan France in 2003 and joined Centre Fédéral de Basket-ball, then Pau-Orthez in 2006.

Vaty played his first minutes in LNB Pro A in the 2007–08 season with Pau-Lacq-Orthez. He won a bronze medal with the French U-19 team at the 2007 FIBA Under-19 Basketball World Cup in Serbia. In 2009, he was shortlisted for the French national team, but did not make the final cut.

Vaty entered his name in the 2009 NBA draft, but was not selected. That summer, he signed with Orléans Loiret Basket. He once again entered his name into the 2010 NBA draft, but was also not selected. That summer, he signed with the Spanish club CB Granada, but his contract was invalidated due to an ankle injury. On 9 September 2010, he returned to Orléans to replace Zach Moss, who had fractured his rib. In the 2011 offseason, he signed with BCM Gravelines-Dunkerque. In February 2013, he was named MVP of the LNB Pro A Leaders Cup, which he had one with Gravelines-Dunkerque.

On 23 May 2013, Vaty was forced to retire early due to a heart condition incompatible with the practice of high-level sport. On 28 January 2014, he was named an assistant coach of the French U-18 national team. In autumn 2014, he returned to playing basketball at an amateur level with Élan Pau Nord-Est of the Nationale Masculine 2. In July 2016, he joined Tarbes-Lourdes of Nationale Masculine 1. After a season with JSA Bordeaux Basket, he joined Coteaux de Luy in 2019.

In August 2023, as a player for TOAC Basket, Vaty suffered a heart attack in training and was placed into a medically induced coma. He died in Toulouse on 1 September 2023, at the age of 34.
