= Orléans Loiret Basket =

- Leagues: Pro B
- Founded: 1993; 33 years ago
- History: Entente Orléanaise Loiret (1993–2010); Orléans Loiret Basket (2010–present)
- Arena: CO'Met Arena
- Capacity: 10150
- Location: Orléans, France
- Team colors: Maroon, Gold
- President: Olivier Rouet
- Head coach: Lamine Kébé
- Championships: 1 Pro B Championship; 1 French Cup; 2 Leaders Cup Pro B
- Website: orleansloiretbasket.fr
| Home | Away |

Orléans Loiret Basket, formerly known as Entente Orléanaise and Entente Orléanaise 45 Loiret, is a professional basketball club that is based in the city of Orléans, France. "45" is the number of Loiret. The club plays in the French Pro B League.

== History ==
Entente Orléanaise was founded in 1993. The club was the French Cup runner-up and the French Pro B League champion in 2006. Orléans Loiret Basket competed in the French Pro A League for the first time in the 2006–07 season. In 2009 and 2010, the club was the French La Semaine des As Cup runner-up.

The following season, the club competed in the EuroLeague, Europe's most prestigious competition. At the end of the season, in 2010, OLB won the French Cup, against Gravelines-Dunkerque, which was the first national cup title win in their history.

In 2017, the club was relegated to the second division, Pro B, before returning to Betclic Elite two years later, qualifying for the play-offs in 2021 and dropping back down to Pro B in 2022.

Until the end of March 2023, they played games at the 3,222-capacity Palais des Sports, with the big games being played at the 5,500-capacity Zénith d'Orléans. 2023 was marked by their entry into their new major venue, the 10 150-capacity CO'Met Arena.

In 2025, OLB won a new trophy, the Leaders Cup Pro B, beating Boulazac. The following year, in 2026, it was won again Caen Basket Calvados.

== Arena ==
The club's home arena for Pro B national domestic games is the 10150 seat CO'Met Arena.

== Honours and titles ==
=== Domestic ===
- Pro B
  - Champions (1): 2005–06
- French Cup
  - Winners (1): 2009–10
- 'Leaders Cup Pro B
  - Winners (1): 2024–25, 2025-26

== European record ==
| Season | Achievement | Notes |
EuroLeague
| 2009–10 | Regular season | 6th place in Group B with Olympiacos, Unicaja, Partizan, Efes Pilsen and Lietuvos rytas |
EuroCup
| 2010–11 | Qualifying round | Eliminated by Azovmash in the qualifying round |
| 2012–13 | Regular season | 4th place in Group H with Spartak Saint Petersburg, Ulm and Dinamo Sassari |
FIBA EuroChallenge
| 2010–11 | Regular season | 4th place in Group H with Oostende, Mons-Hainaut and SLUC Nancy |

== Season by season ==
| Season | Tier | League | Pos. | French Cup | European competitions | |
|---|---|---|---|---|---|---|
| 2009–10 | 1 | Pro A | 6th | Champions | 1 Euroleague | RS |
| 2010–11 | 1 | Pro A | 11th | | 3 EuroChallenge | RS |
| 2011–12 | 1 | Pro A | 3rd | | | |
| 2012–13 | 1 | Pro A | 10th | | 2 Eurocup | RS |
| 2013–14 | 1 | Pro A | 9th | | | |
| 2014–15 | 1 | Pro A | 16th | | | |
| 2015–16 | 1 | Pro A | 11th | | | |
| 2016–17 | 1 | Pro A | 17th | | | |
| 2017–18 | 1 | Pro B | 6th | | | |
| 2018–19 | 1 | Pro B | 2nd | | | |
| 2019–20 | 1 | Pro A | 13th | | | |
| 2020–21 | 1 | Pro A | 8th | | | |
| 2021–22 | 1 | Pro A | 17th | | | |
| 2022–23 | 1 | Pro B | 7th | | | |
| 2023–24 | 1 | Pro B | 4th | | | |
| 2024–25 | 1 | Pro B | 3rd | | | |

== Players ==
=== Current roster ===
Note: Flags indicate national team eligibility at FIBA-sanctioned events. Players may hold other non-FIBA nationalities not displayed.

Orléans Loiret roster
Players
Coaches

| Pos. | No. | Nat. | Name | Ht. | Wt. | Age |
|---|---|---|---|---|---|---|
| PF | 88 | (Croatia) | Gabrić, Tomislav | 2.04 m (6 ft 8 in) | | 31 – 17 August 1995 |
| C | 99 | (Netherlands) | Kuta, Nathan | 2.05 m (6 ft 9 in) | | 26 – 20 April 2000 |
| PG | | (Mali) | Kanouté, Siriman | 1.83 m (6 ft 0 in) | | 25 – 25 September 2001 |

Head coach

- (France) Lamine Kébé

Assistant coach(es)

- (France) Steeve Bourgeois
- (France) Pierre Tillay

Legend

- (C) Team captain
- Injured

- Roster
Updated: June 8, 2025

== Notable players ==
Note: Flags indicate national team eligibility at FIBA-sanctioned events. Players may hold other non-FIBA nationalities not displayed.

Criteria

To appear in this section a player must have either:

- Set a club record or won an individual award while at the club
- Played at least one official international match for their national team at any time
- Played at least one official NBA match at any time.

- (France) Nobel Boungou Colo
- (France) Antoine Eito
- (France) Adrien Moerman
- (France) Malela Mutuale
- (France) Marc-Antoine Pellin
- (France) Laurent Sciarra
- (France) (Kosovo) Elio Sadiku
- (Bosnia and Herzegovina) Miralem Halilović
- (Croatia) Tomislav Gabrić
- (Mali) Amara Sy
- (Nigeria) Chima Moneke
- (Senegal) Maleye N'Doye
- (Canada) Kris Joseph
- (United States) Cedrick Banks
- (United States) Brian Greene
- (United States) Brandon Heath
- (United States) Brandon Jefferson
- (United States) Paris Lee
- (United States) Kyle McAlarney
- (United States) David Noel
- (United States) J. R. Reynolds
- (United States) Theron Smith
- (United States) Chevon Troutman

== Head coaches ==
- (France) Philippe Herve
- (France) Germain Castano
