= Gravelines Sportica =

Indoor sporting arena in France

Coordinates: 50.999023°N 2.122743°E

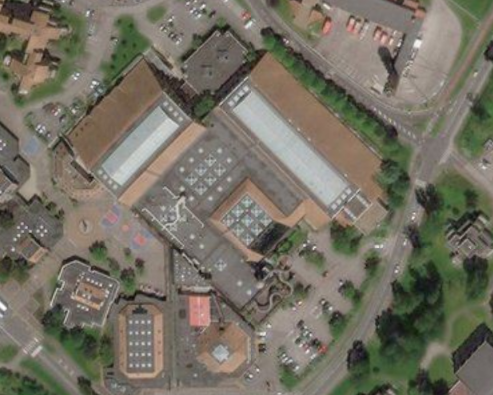
- Interactive map of Gravelines Sportica

Gravelines Sportica was an indoor sporting arena located in Gravelines, France. The capacity of the arena is 3,500 people. It was home to the Basket Club Maritime Gravelines Dunkerque Grand Littoral basketball team. The arena was destroyed by fire on December 25, 2023.

== Complex structure ==
The establishment covered 25,000 m2 and offered different services within the same site.

The Sportica complex was above all known for its basketball hall, with a capacity of 2,500 seated places and 3,000 including those standing, since it hosted the Basketball Club Maritime Gravelines Dunkerque Grand Littoral (BCM), a professional team of Jeep Elite. Expansion projects to offer more seats were also being considered.

In previous seasons, a few hundred “standing” places were sold, bringing the capacity of the room to 3,500 people, and bringing attendance beyond 100% (107% in 2001-2002, 105% in 2004-2005).

== 2023 fire and destruction of sports complex ==
The complex was destroyed by an accidental fire on December 25, 2023. The fire reportedly started from an electrical incident near the swimming pool's slide, before reaching the basketball hall. The basketball hall and BCM's facilities were destroyed.
