= Ivan Radenović =

Serbian basketball player

Ivan Radenović Иван Раденовић
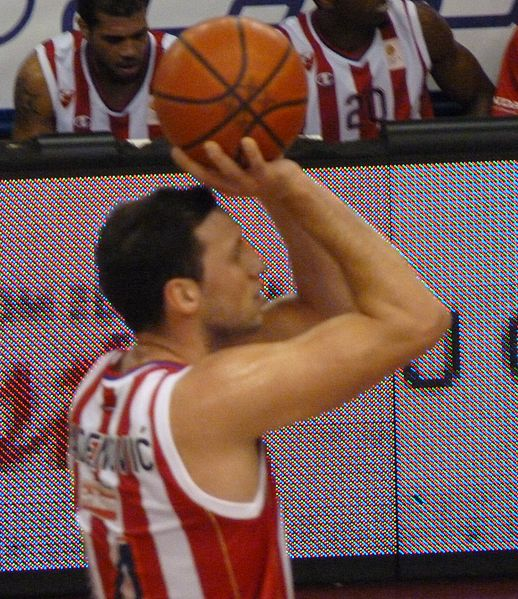
- Radenović with Crvena zvezda in December 2013

Personal information
- Born: June 10, 1984 (age 42) Belgrade, SR Serbia, SFR Yugoslavia
- Listed height: 2.09 m (6 ft 10 in)
- Listed weight: 111 kg (245 lb)

Career information
- College: Arizona (2003–2007)
- NBA draft: 2007: undrafted
- Playing career: 2002–2017
- Position: Power forward / center

Career history
- 2002–2003: Partizan
- 2007–2008: Akasvayu Girona
- 2008–2009: Panellinios
- 2009: CSKA Moscow
- 2009–2010: Cajasol Sevilla
- 2010–2011: Menorca Bàsquet
- 2011–2013: Donetsk
- 2013–2014: Crvena zvezda
- 2015: AZS Koszalin
- 2015–2016: Igokea
- 2016: Hapoel Holon
- 2017: Spirou Charleroi

Career highlights
- Serbian Cup winner (2014)

Ivan Radenović (Serbian: Иван Раденовић; born June 10, 1984) is a Serbian former professional basketball player. Standing at 2.09 m (6 ft 10 1/2 in), he plays at the power forward and center positions. He played college basketball for the Arizona Wildcats.

== Early life ==
Radenović was born in Belgrade, Socialist Republic of Serbia, in the former Yugoslavia, and began playing basketball in the junior teams for Partizan Belgrade. His talent came to prominence during the 2002 Albert Schweitzer Games in Germany where he played for a Serbian youth team, averaging 7.4 points and 3.0 rebounds per game, while shooting 59.3 percent (16-of-27) from the floor. He made his senior debut for Partizan during the 2002–03 season.

== College career ==
Mid-way through the 2003–04 season, Radenović joined the Arizona Wildcats men's basketball team and their head coach Lute Olson, where he had a successful debut, scoring 17 points against Liberty University on December 28, 2003. That same season, Radenović earned Honorable Mention Pac-10 All Freshman honors. He was an excellent addition to the Wildcats' team that needed help at the center position. That season Radenović averaged 5.8 points per game, 2.9 rebounds per game, and shot 25.7% from the three-point line, 39.7% in field goals, and 76.7% from the free throw line.

During the 2004–05 season, Radenović's game improved a lot. He was a key man on a Wildcats team that lost to the Illinois Fighting Illini in the 2005 NCAA Men's Division I Basketball Tournament Elite Eight game. During the season Radenović averaged 8.6 points per game, 5.5 rebounds per game, and posted four double doubles and six double figure rebounding games. A notable performance was his Pac-10 game at UCLA where he scored 19 points and grabbed 12 rebounds. The same season Radenović was voted the most improved player of them by his teammates.

In the 2005–06 season, Radenović was a key player on a Wildcats' team plagued by off-court problems. He was named the team's co-MVP by his teammates. That same season he averaged 12.5 points per game and 6.3 rebounds per game, and had a team-leading four double-doubles during the season.

His senior season of 2006–07 was his year as a leader on a team filled with talent. The absence of Kirk Walters' rebounding throughout the season damaged the Wildcats' game plan. The Wildcats were forced to rely on the younger members on the roster like Chase Budinger and Marcus Williams and eventually lost to Purdue in the first round of the 2007 March Madness Tournament. For the 2006–07 season Radenović averaged 15.1 points per game, 7.6 rebounds per game and 2.1 assists per game, and shoot 50.7% from the field. His highlight of the season was a 37-point, 9-rebound and 7-assist performance in an 85–80 overtime win over Stanford on March 3, 2007. This included 11 of 11 free throws. In that game he was guarded by two future NBA players, top-14 pick Brook Lopez and his twin brother Robin Lopez.

== Professional career ==
After going undrafted in the 2007 NBA draft, Radenović joined the Los Angeles Clippers for the Las Vegas Summer League. However, he played in only three out of the five games for the Clippers, after which he parted ways with the team. In August 2007, Radenović moved to Europe and signed a two-year contract with the Akasvayu Girona of the Spanish Liga ACB. After one season with Girona, he moved to the Greek League club Panellinios, signing one-year contract.

In September 2009, Radenović signed a one-year contract with the Russian powerhouse CSKA Moscow, but at the end of December his contract was terminated. He ended the 2009–10 season at the Spanish team Cajasol Sevilla. In August 2010, he moved to Menorca Bàsquet for the 2010–11 season. In July 2011, he signed a two-year contract with Donetsk.

On September 24, 2013, he signed with Crvena zvezda for the 2013–14 season. Over 10 Euroleague games with Crvena zvezda, he averaged 8.2 points, 3.5 rebounds and 1.7 assists per game.

On 25 January 2015, he signed with the Polish club AZS Koszalin for the rest of the 2014–15 PLK season.

On October 6, 2015, he signed an open-contract with the Bosnian team Igokea. In January 2016, he left Igokea and signed with Hapoel Holon for the rest of the 2015–16 Israeli League season.

On January 24, 2017, Radenović signed with Belgian club Spirou Charleroi for the rest of the 2016–17 season.

== Career statistics ==
Legend
GP	Games played	GS	Games started	MPG	Minutes per game
FG%	Field-goal percentage	3P%	3-point field-goal percentage	FT%	Free-throw percentage
RPG	Rebounds per game	APG	Assists per game	SPG	Steals per game
BPG	Blocks per game	PPG	Points per game	PIR	Performance index rating
**Bold**	Career high

=== Euroleague ===
Year	Team	GP	GS	MPG	FG%	3P%	FT%	RPG	APG	SPG	BPG	PPG	PIR
2009–10	CSKA Moscow	6	0	10.2	**.500**	.000	**.750**	1.0	.3	.0	**.2**	2.5	1.2
2013–14	Crvena zvezda	**10**	**3**	**21.1**	.491	**.235**	.794	**3.5**	**1.7**	**.8**	.1	**8.2**	**9.9**
Career		16	3	17.0	.493	.235	.658	2.6	1.2	.5	.1	6.0	6.6

== See also ==
- List of Serbian NBA Summer League players
