= BCM Gravelines-Dunkerque =

French basketball club

- Leagues: LNB Élite
- Founded: 1984; 42 years ago
- History: BCM Gravelines; 1984–2002; BCM Gravelines-Dunkerque; 2002–present
- Arena: Sportica (former)
- Capacity: 3,043
- Location: Gravelines, France
- Team colors: Orange, Blue
- President: Christian Devos
- Head coach: Jean-Christophe Prat
- Championships: 1 French Cup; 1 Pro B 2 Semaine des As
- Website: bcmbasket.com
Home	Away	Third

Basket Club Maritime Gravelines-Dunkerque, commonly referred to as BCM Gravelines-Dunkerque, is a French professional basketball club based in Gravelines, France. They currently play in the LNB Élite, the highest professional league in France. The team formerly played its home games at Sportica before that arena was destroyed by fire on 24 December 2023.

== History ==
During the summer of 2012, Gravelines secured the services of a player who would become a club legend, Dwight Buycks. His teammates included Ludovic Vaty, JK Edwards, Ousmane Camara, and Yannick Bokolo, and they formed one of the greatest teams in the club's history.

The team did not compete for the French championship title and was eliminated in the round of 16. However, it won the Leaders Cup (formerly known as Semain edes As) for the second time in its history

The 2020–21 season brought severe challenges as the club struggled with the Covid breaks plus had to compensate for the injuries of key players such as Erik McCree and Briante Weber. Yet, the arrival of new head coach JD Jackson brought some victories so that the team was able to stay in the country's prime division.

For the 2021–2022 season, the club is extending coach JD Jackson. They signed during the summer, players like Vafessa Fofana, Marcquise Reed, Brandon Taylor, and Dominik Olejniczak. The club will go to the 1/2 finals of the Coupe de France and will finish in 12th place in the standings.

During the 2022/23 season the club announced the arrivals of many players during the summer, such as JaJuan Johnson and DJ Seeley. However, after 11 games, the club separated from coach JD Jackson and signed the former coach of Bourg, Laurent Legname! The new coach made a rise in the standings, going from 15th place in November to 8th place for a time. Only two players left the team, and Kenny Boynton will replace DJ Seeley, who returned to the EuroLeague at Bayern Munich. Legname and his team played in the playoffs during the final day against SLUC Nancy. The BCM failed by a few points at home and will send Strasbourg to 8th place.

== The European Cup ==
The club experienced its first qualification in the European Cup Korac Cup in 1990. Qualified for the 2nd round, the BCM then faced CB Estudiantes. It was after two memorable matches that the BCM lost to the great Spanish club.

During the 2002–2003 season, the BCM competed in the EuroCup and achieved one of the best runs of this first edition.

Participation during the 2007–2008 season in the preliminary round of the FIBA Europe Cup. The club automatically qualified for the FIBA Europe Cup during the 2009–2010 and 2010–2011 seasons.

For the 2011–2012 season, the BCM participated for the first time in its history in the qualifying round of the largest European competition, the EuroLeague. The club lost against ASVEL. They participated in the EuroCup this year.

Return to the FIBA Europe Cup the following season, with a Final Four at the end in Turkey.

During the 2013–2014 season the club participated in the EuroCup but experienced a very difficult season.

In 3 seasons the BCM would be in the European Cup again in the FIBA Europe Cup for the 2016–2017 season.

On 19 June 2023, the club formalized its return to the FIBA Europe Cup more than six years after its last appearance. On 22 November the BCM qualified for the Top 16 of the FIBA Europe Cup.

== Prize list ==
- LNB Pro A
  - Finalists (1): 2003–2004.
- French Cup
  - Winners (1): 2004–2005.
  - Finalists (2): 2002–2003 / 2009–2010.
- Leaders Cup
  - Winners (2): 2010-2011 / 2012–2013.
  - Finalists (2): 2004–2005 / 2011–2012.
- Pro B
  - Winners (1): 1987–1988.

== Participations in European Cups ==
- EuroLeague qualifyers (1)
  - 2011-2012
- Eurocup (5)
  - 2002-2003 / 2003–2004 / 2004-2005 / 2011-2012 / 2013-2014
- FIBA Europe Cup (6)
  - 2007-2008 / 2009-2010 / 2010-2011 / 2012-2013 / 2016-2017 / 2023-2024
- Korac Cup (1)
  - 1990-1991

== Season by season ==
Season	Tier	League	Pos.	French Cup	Leaders Cup	European competitions	
2010–11	1	Pro A	4th	Quarterfinalist	Champion	1 EuroChallenge	T8
2011–12	1	Pro A	1st	Semifinalist	Runner-up	1 Euroleague	QR1
2011–12	1	Pro A	1st	Semifinalist	Runner-up	2 Eurocup	T16
2012–13	1	Pro A	1st	Round of 16	Champion	1 EuroChallenge	T4
2013–14	1	Pro A	12th	Round of 16		2 Eurocup	L32
2014–15	1	Pro A	9th	Round of 16			
2015–16	1	Pro A	6th	Semifinalist	Quarterfinalist		
2016–17	1	Pro A	9th	Round of 16	Quarterfinalist	1 FIBA Europe Cup	T16
2017–18	1	Pro A	13th	Round of 16			
2018–19	1	Pro A	11th	Round of 32			
2019–20	1	JeepELITE	17th	Quarterfinalist			
2020–21	1	JeepELITE	15th	Quarterfinalist			
2021–22	1	BetclicELITE	12th	Semifinalist			
2022–23	1	BetclicELITE	10th	Round of 16			
2023–24	1	BetclicELITE	15th	Round of 16		4 FIBA Europe Cup	T16
2024–25	1	BetclicELITE	11th	Round of 32			

== Players ==
=== Current roster ===
Note: Flags indicate national team eligibility at FIBA-sanctioned events. Players may hold other non-FIBA nationalities not displayed.

BCM Gravelines-Dunkerque roster
Players
Coaches

Pos.	No.	Nat.	Name	Ht.	Wt.	Age
C	00	(Hungary)	Hopkins, Mikael	2.06 m (6 ft 9 in)	105 kg (231 lb)	33 – 23 June 1993
PF	1	(United States)	Lewis, Jaren	2.01 m (6 ft 7 in)	97 kg (214 lb)	29 – 25 November 1996
G	2	(United States)	Nembhard, RJ	1.93 m (6 ft 4 in)	91 kg (201 lb)	27 – 22 March 1999
SF	6	(France)	Fofana, Vafessa	2.01 m (6 ft 7 in)	92 kg (203 lb)	34 – 12 June 1992
PG	7	(United States)	Gilyard, Jacob	1.75 m (5 ft 9 in)	75 kg (165 lb)	28 – 14 July 1998
SF	10	(France)	Letailleur, Louka	2.00 m (6 ft 7 in)		18 – 22 May 2008
C	12	(United States)	Martin, Hassan	2.01 m (6 ft 7 in)	109 kg (240 lb)	30 – 22 November 1995
C	21	(France)	Trefle, Jahel	2.05 m (6 ft 9 in)	98 kg (216 lb)	18 – 21 December 2007
PG	22	(France)	Bracq, Soren	1.89 m (6 ft 2 in)	86 kg (190 lb)	19 – 23 February 2007
G/F	24	(United States)	Dawkins, Aubrey	1.98 m (6 ft 6 in)	93 kg (205 lb)	31 – 8 May 1995
C	32	(Ireland)	Quinn, Neal (injured)	2.13 m (7 ft 0 in)	127 kg (280 lb)	25 – 31 May 2001
SG	40	(France)	Boune, Moussa	1.90 m (6 ft 3 in)		17 – 28 September 2009
G	41	(France)	Boungo, Sohan	1.90 m (6 ft 3 in)		17 – 23 March 2009
PF	42	(France)	Peyre, Tanguy	2.01 m (6 ft 7 in)		19 – 8 May 2007
F/C	43	(France)	Thenawha Nougha, César	1.98 m (6 ft 6 in)		17 – 9 February 2009
PG	77	(United States)	Thorpe, L.J.	1.96 m (6 ft 5 in)	98 kg (216 lb)	27 – 6 May 1999

Head coach

- (France) Jean-Christophe Prat

Assistant coach(es)

- (France) Pierrick Moukenga
- (France) Dominique Roinard

Legend

- (C) Team captain
- Injured

- Roster
Updated: November 3, 2026

=== Depth chart ===
Pos.	Starting 5	Bench 1	Bench 2	Bench 3	Inactive
C	Mikael Hopkins °	Jahel Trefle †	Hassan Martin *		Neal Quinn ° (injured)
PF	Jaren Lewis ^	Tanguy Peyre †	César Thenawha Nougha ‡
SF	Louka Letailleur †	Aubrey Dawkins *	Vafessa Fofana †
SG	RJ Nembhard ^	Moussa Boune ‡	Sohan Boungo ‡
PG	Jacob Gilyard *	Soren Bracq †	L. J. Thorpe *	Adrien Guermeur †

Notes: The LNB Élite strictly enforces a "JFL" (Joueur Formé Localement) system to protect domestic talent, alongside limits on international transfers. Blue † – JFL player; (Note: A JFL player is a player that played for at least three years between the ages of 12 and 21 on a French team. To qualify as a JFL, a player does not necessarily need French citizenship but must have spent at least three seasons training in a French club’s youth academy system between the ages of 12 and 21. Minimum of 4 JFL players must be included on the active roster. In EuroLeague, the team did not have any limitations regarding the number of JFL players.) Red * – foreign player; (Note: A foreign player is a player from outside France. Maximum of 4 "Foreigners" (Non-EU / Non-Cotonou) are allowed. Players from the United States or Canada typically fall under this category.) Purple °; – Cotonou player (Note: "Cotonou+" players: Players holding passports from European Union nations or countries party to the Cotonou Agreement do not count against the 4-"Foreigner" cap, but they do count toward the overall 6 non-JFL maximum. In EuroLeague, the team did not have any limitations regarding the number of Cotonou players.) Gold ^; – non-JFL player (Note: "Non-JFL" players: players who do not qualify as "Locally Trained" (Joueur Formé Localement) under French basketball regulations. A maximum of 6 non-JFL players are allowed on a game sheet.) Green ‡ – youth player (Note: "Youth" players: players who are under the age of 20. In LNB Élite, there is no strict mandatory minimum requirement forcing teams to put youth players on their active 12-man game sheet. However, the league uses a highly integrated structure that connects senior squads directly to youth development through the "Espoirs" (U21) system.)

=== Notable players ===
Note: Flags indicate national team eligibility at FIBA-sanctioned events. Players may hold other non-FIBA nationalities not displayed.

Criteria

To appear in this section a player must have either:

- Set a club record or won an individual award while at the club
- Played at least one official international match for their national team at any time
- Played at least one official NBA match at any time.

- (United States) Dwight Buycks
- (France) Cyril Akpomedah
- (United States) K'Zell Wesson
- (France) Yannick Bokolo
- (United States) Julius Johnson
- (France) Benjamin Sene
- (United States) Richard Solomon
- (Finland) Edon Maxhuni
- (France) Adam Mokoka
- (United States) Jerry McCullough
- (France) (Ivory Coast) Vafessa Fofana
- (United States) Ben Woodside
- (France) Pape Sy
- (United States) Bobby Dixon
- (France) Hervé Dubuisson
- (United States) Taylor Smith
- (Lithuania) Dainius Adomaitis
- (United States) Justin Cobbs
- (France) Moustapha Sonko
- (United States) JaJuan Johnson
- (France) Andrew Albicy
- (United States) Larry Lawrence
- (France) Florent Pietrus
- (United States) George Montgomery
- (France) Ludovic Vaty
- (United States) Briante Weber
- (France) Alain Koffi
- (United States) Lawrence Roberts
- (Ivory Coast) Souleyman Diabate
- (France) Laurent Sciarra
- (United States) (Puerto Rico) John Holland

== Head coaches ==
- (France) Christian Devos (1986–1989)
- (France) Jean Galle (1989–1995)
- (Senegal) Abdou N'Diaye (1991–1994)
- (France) Jean-Denys Choulet (1996–2000)
- (France) Jean-Luc Monschau (2000–2004)
- (France) Fabrice Courcier (2004–2006)
- (France) Frédéric Sarre (2006–2008)
- (France) Christian Monschau (2008–2017)
- (France) Julien Mahé (2017–2019)
- (France) Eric Bartecheky (2019–2020)
- (Belgium) Serge Crevecoeur (2020–2021)
- (Canada) J. D. Jackson (2021–2022)
- (France) Laurent Legname (2022–2023)
- (France) Jean-Christophe Prat (2023–present)
