= List of sports medicine organizations =

This list of sports medicine organizations includes professional associations (but not, e.g., hospitals, clinics, or universities) for healthcare workers who are professionally involved in sports medicine. There is a separate list for organizations primarily catering to coaches, personal trainers, and fitness centers. Some of these organizations offer professional credentialing or training to members, or may sponsor a medical journal or research.

== Medical organizations ==
List of medical organizations
Organization	Location	References
American College of Sports Medicine	United States	
American Medical Society for Sports Medicine	United States	
American Orthopaedic Society for Sports Medicine (AOSSM)	United States	
Australasian College of Sport and Exercise Physicians	Australia and New Zealand	
British Association of Sport and Exercise Medicine	United Kingdom	
Canadian Academy of Sport and Exercise Medicine	Canada	
Canadian Athletic Therapists Association	Canada	
European Federation of Sports Medicine Associations (FIMS)	Europe	
Faculty of Sport and Exercise Medicine UK	United Kingdom	
Fédération Internationale de Medicine Sportive	global	
Institut de recherche biomédicale et d'épidémiologie du sport	France	
International Society of Arthroscopy, Knee Surgery and Orthopaedic Sports Medicine	global	
Nicholas Institute of Sports Medicine and Athletic Trauma	United States	
Sports Medicine Australia	Australia	

== Athletic trainers and fitness centers ==
Organizations for athletic trainers and other fitness workers
Organization	Location	References
National Academy of Sports Medicine	United States	
National Athletic Trainers' Association	United States	
