= LNB Élite Most Improved Player =

The LNB Élite Most Improved Player Award is an annual professional basketball award that is given by the top tier division in France, the LNB Élite. It is awarded to the player who showed the most progress in a given season, as compared to the previous season.

== Winners ==
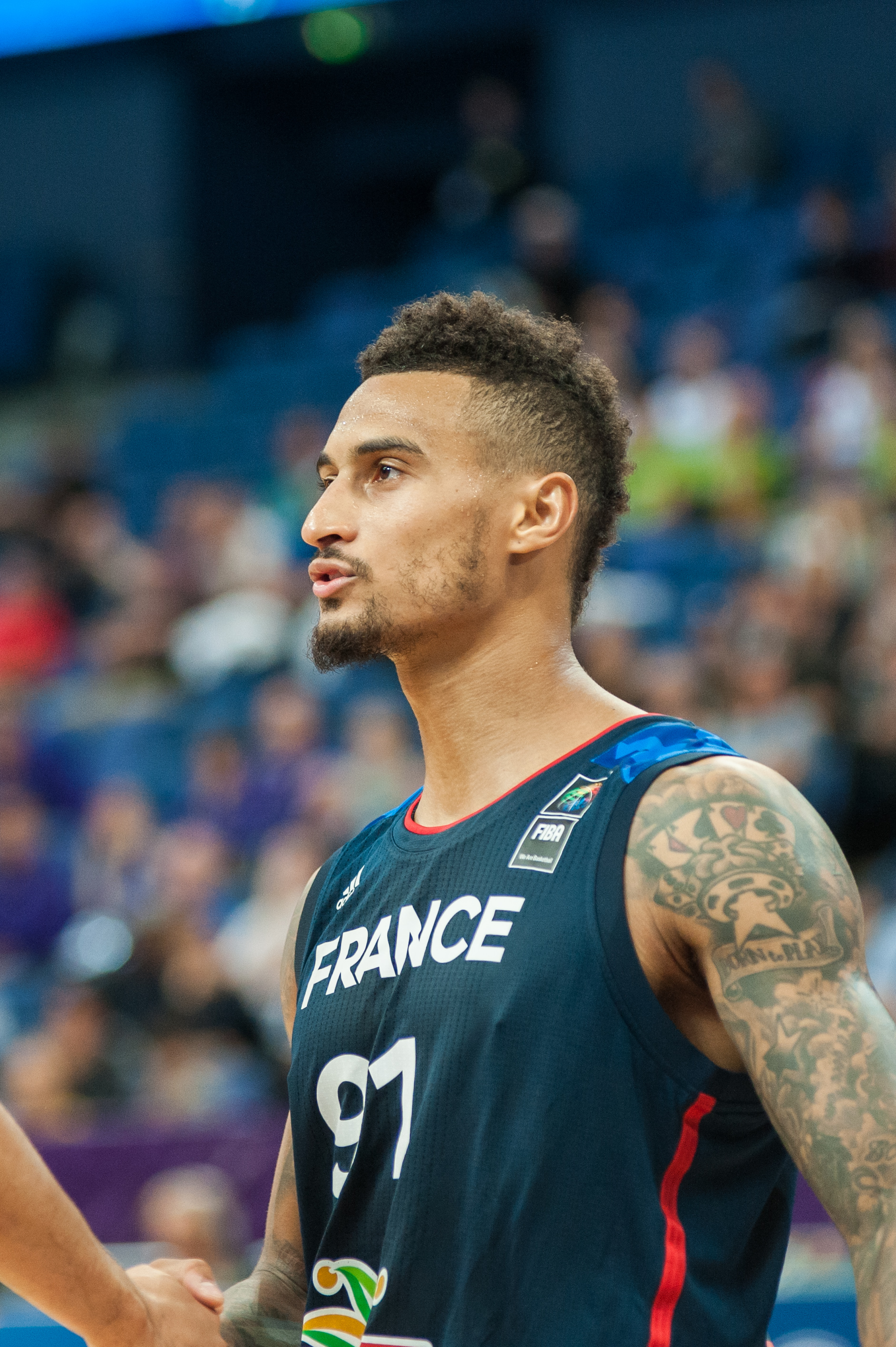
Guard Edwin Jackson won the award in 2013

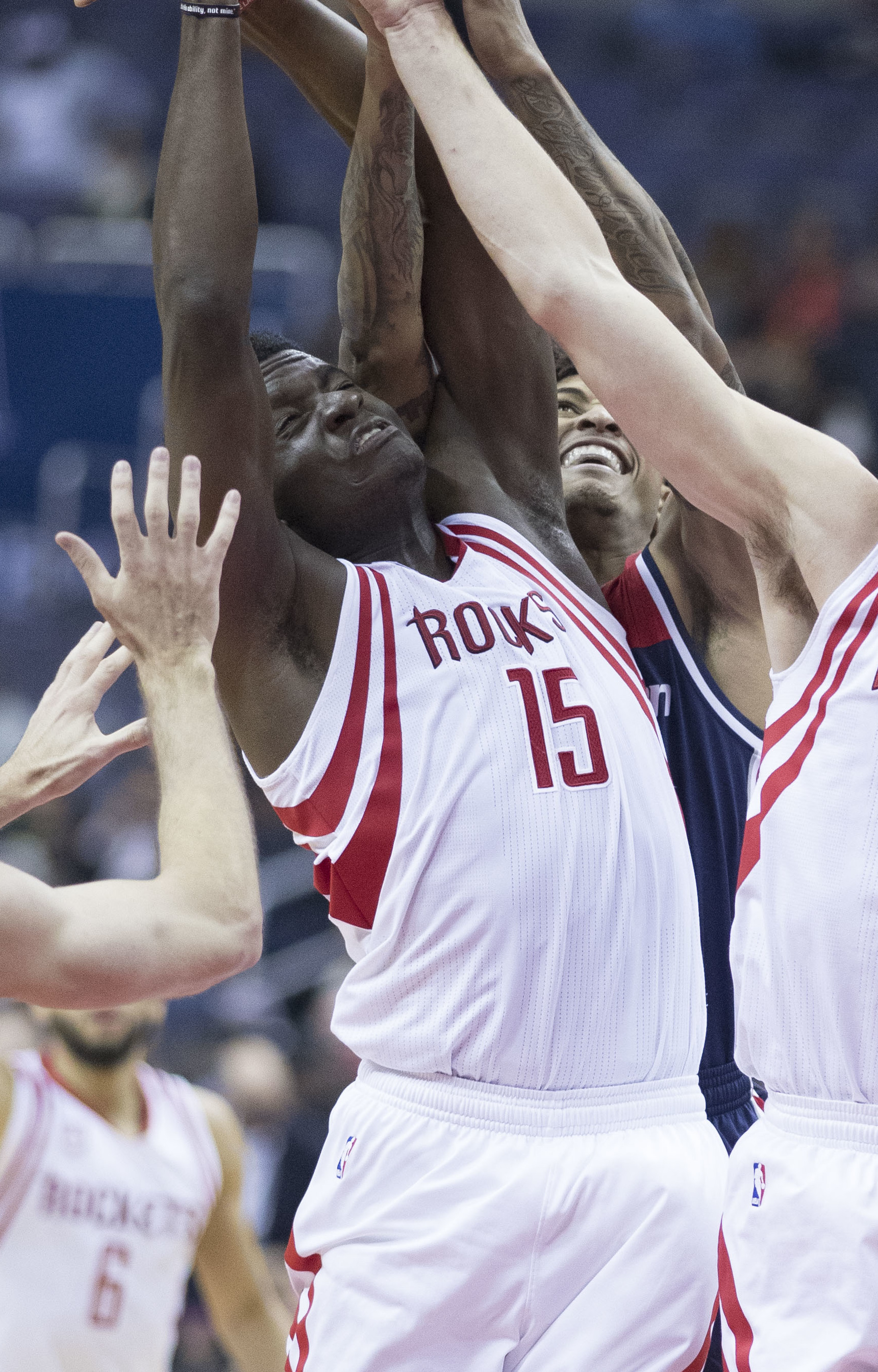
Clint Capela was the first Swiss player to win the award in 2014

^	Denotes player who is still active in the Pro A
*	Inducted into the FIBA Hall of Fame
Player (X)	Denotes the number of times the player has received the award

Season	Player	Position	Nationality	Team
2007–08	Nando de Colo^	Guard	France	Cholet
2008–09	Rodrigue Beaubois	Guard	France	Cholet
2009–10	Kevin Seraphin	Center	France	Cholet
2010–11	Evan Fournier	Guard	France	Poitiers
2011–12	Evan Fournier (2)	Guard	France	Poitiers
2012–13	Edwin Jackson^	Guard	France	ASVEL
2013–14	Clint Capela	Center	Switzerland	Cholet
2014–15	Benjamin Sene^	Guard	France	SLUC Nancy
2015–16	Wilfried Yeguete^	Guard	France	Pau-Orthez
2016–17	Paul Lacombe^	Guard	France	SIG Strasbourg
2024–25	Clément Frisch	Forward	France	SLUC Nancy
2025–26	Gérald Ayayi	Guard	France	Cholet
