= 2012 NBA draft =

66th edition of the draft

General information
- Sport: Basketball
- Date: June 28, 2012
- Location: Prudential Center (Newark, New Jersey)
- Networks: ESPN; TSN

Overview
- 60 total selections in 2 rounds
- League: NBA
- First selection: Anthony Davis (New Orleans Hornets)

The 2012 NBA draft was held on June 28, 2012, at Prudential Center in Newark, New Jersey. The draft started at 7:00 pm Eastern Daylight Time (2300 UTC), and was broadcast in the United States on ESPN. In this draft, National Basketball Association (NBA) teams took turns selecting amateur U.S. college basketball players and other eligible players, including international players. The New Orleans Hornets, who had a 13.70 percent probability of obtaining the first selection, won the NBA draft lottery on May 30. The Charlotte Bobcats and the Washington Wizards were second and third, respectively. This draft marked the first time that the first two players selected were from the same school (Anthony Davis and Michael Kidd-Gilchrist were teammates at Kentucky). It also set a record of having six players from one school (Kentucky) being selected in the two rounds of the draft and was the first draft to have the first three selections be college freshmen all from the same conference (Southeastern Conference). Bernard James was the oldest player drafted in an NBA draft, being 27 years old at the time of the draft.

The draft contained seven players who combined for 10 championships as well as having Anthony Davis and Damian Lillard both named to the NBA 75th Anniversary Team in 2021. Six players have participated in an All-Star Game. Draymond Green won NBA championships with the Golden State Warriors in 2015, 2017, 2018, and 2022, as well as being named to the All-NBA second team in 2016 and the third team in 2017. Green was named the Defensive Player of the Year in 2017, while also leading the league in steals that season. He was named to the All-Defensive first team in 2015–2017, 2021, and 2025, and named to the second team in 2018–2019 and 2022–2023. He was an All-Star in 2016–2018 and 2022. Anthony Davis won a championship with the Los Angeles Lakers in 2020 and was All-NBA 5 times; first team in 2015, 2017–2018, and 2020, and second team in 2024. Davis was named to the All-Defensive first team in 2018, 2020, and 2024, and second team in 2015 and 2017. He was the NBA blocks leader in 2014, 2015, and 2018. Davis was an All-Star from 2014–2021, and 2024–2025, as well as the NBA All Star Game MVP in 2017. Damian Lillard became the fourth player to be unanimously named Rookie of the Year. Lillard was a member of the All-NBA first team in 2018, second team in 2016, 2019–2021, and third team in 2014, 2023. He was an All-Star in 2014, 2015, 2018–2021, and 2023–2025, the All-Star Game MVP in 2024, as well as the winner of the Three-Point Contest in 2023, 2024, and 2026. Khris Middleton won a championship with the Milwaukee Bucks in 2021 and was selected as an All-Star in 2019–2020, and 2022. As of 2025, Davis, Bradley Beal, Lillard, Harrison Barnes, Andre Drummond, Green, and Middleton are the only players from this draft who are still playing in the NBA.

Of the players drafted, 30 were forwards, 21 were guards, and 9 were centers. The draft marked the first appearance of the Brooklyn Nets and the last draft appearance for the New Orleans Hornets. After the 2012–13 season, the franchise was renamed as the New Orleans Pelicans. New Orleans made their first draft appearance as the Pelicans in 2013. Four of the players selected in this draft never played in an NBA game throughout their professional basketball careers. Two of those players were the sole selection of the draft by their respective teams: İlkan Karaman (Brooklyn's only pick) and Marcus Denmon (San Antonio's only pick).

== Draft selections ==
Position key
PG	Point guard	SG	Shooting guard	SF	Small forward	PF	Power forward	C	Center

Accomplishments key
Symbol	Meaning	Symbol	Meaning
^	Denotes player who has been inducted to the Naismith Memorial Basketball Hall of Fame	‡	Denotes player who has been selected for at least one All-Star Game, All-NBA Team, and won Rookie of the Year
*	Denotes player who has been selected for at least one All-Star Game and All-NBA Team	+	Denotes player who has been selected for at least one All-Star Game
#	Denotes player who has never appeared in an NBA regular season or playoff game	—N/a	—N/a

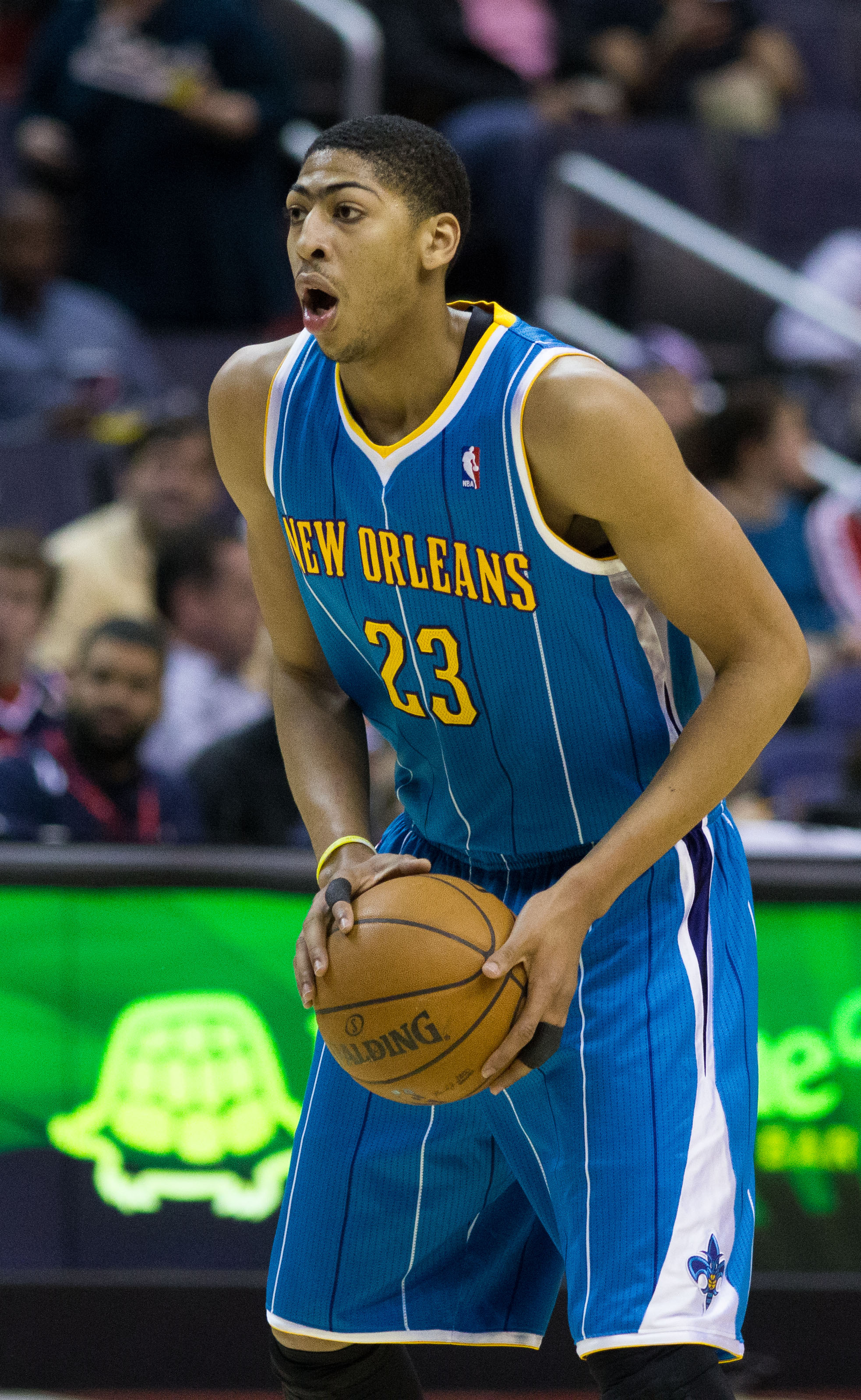
Anthony Davis was selected first by the New Orleans Hornets.

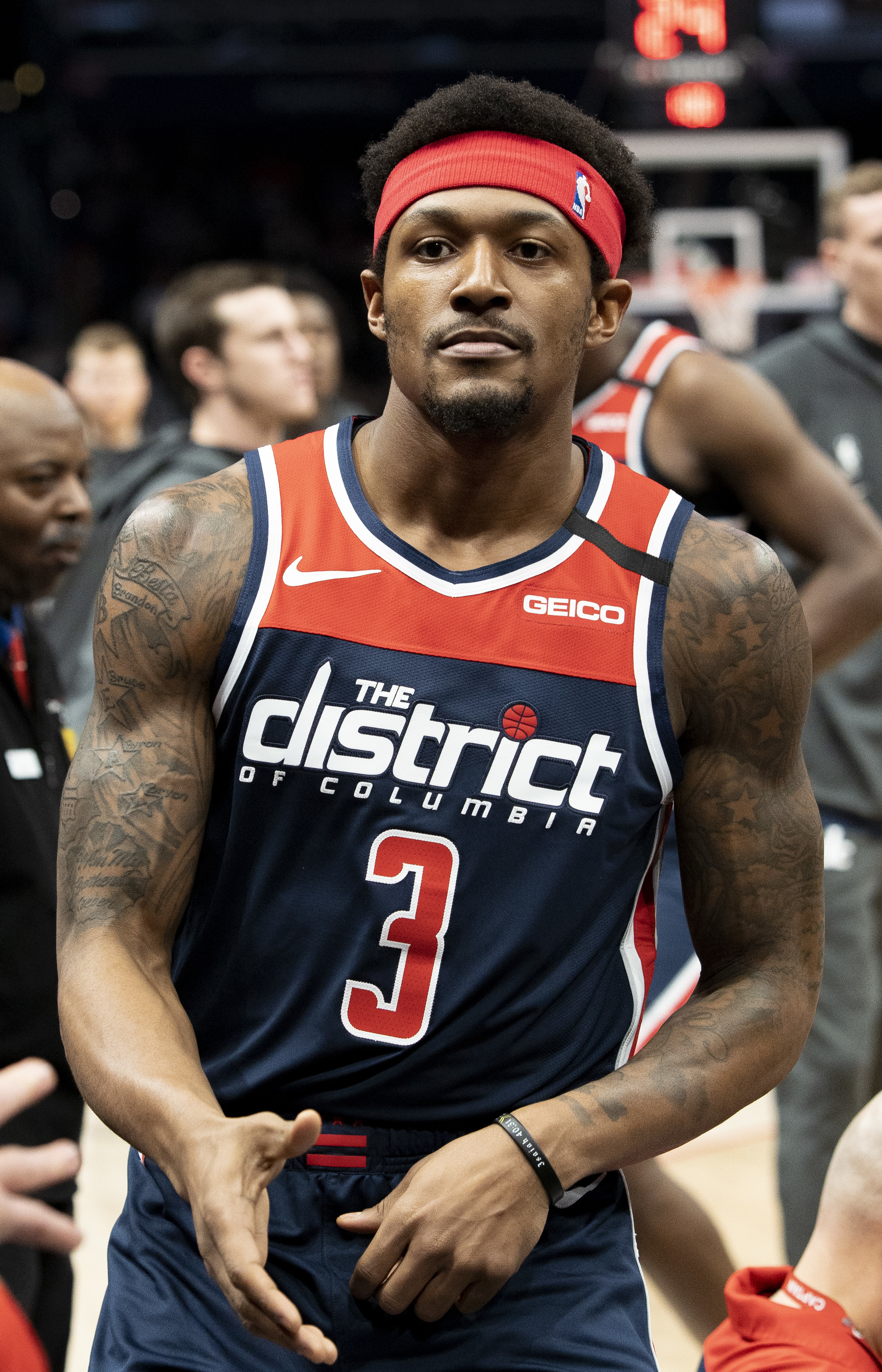
Bradley Beal was selected third by the Washington Wizards.

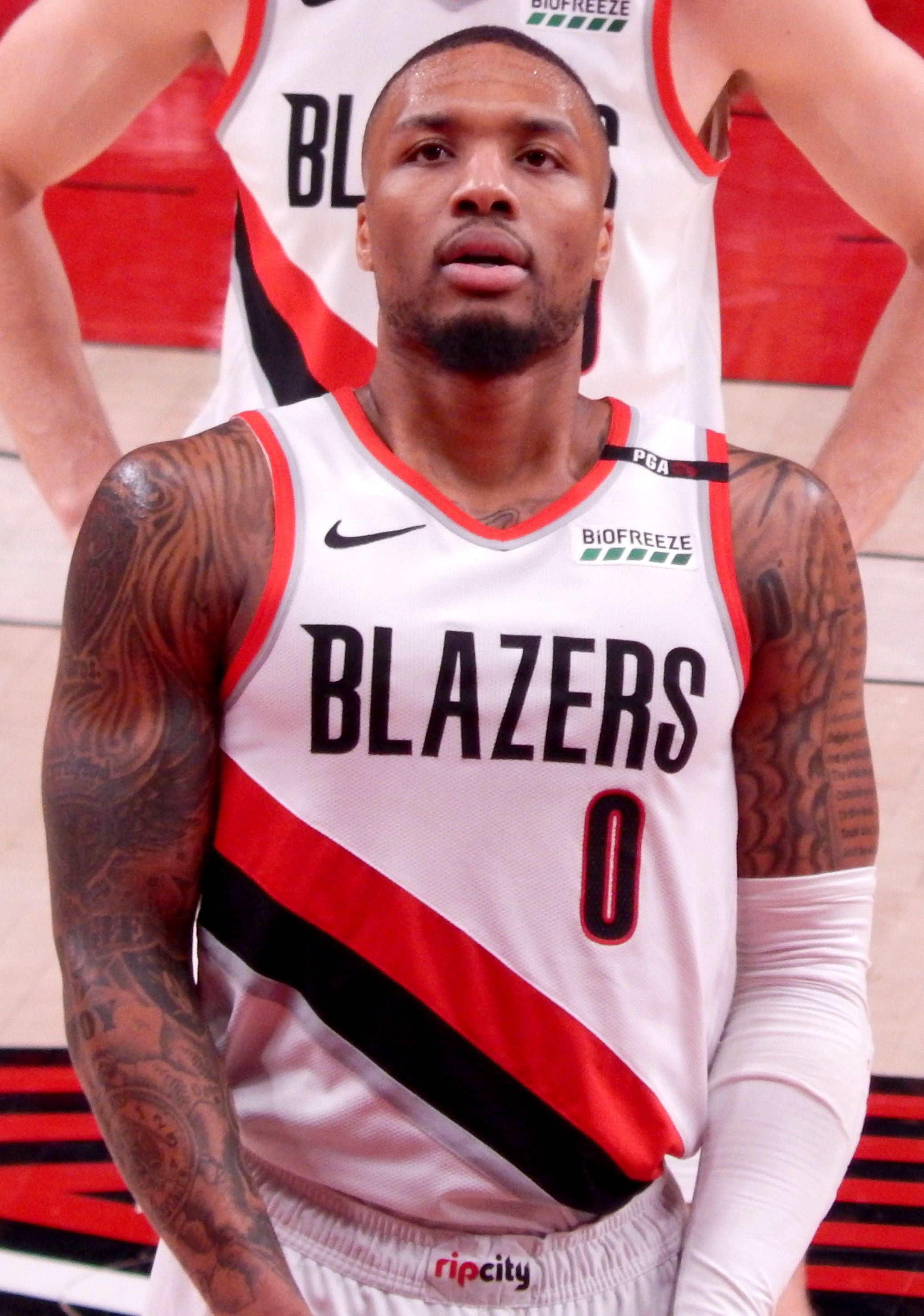
Damian Lillard was selected sixth by the Portland Trail Blazers.

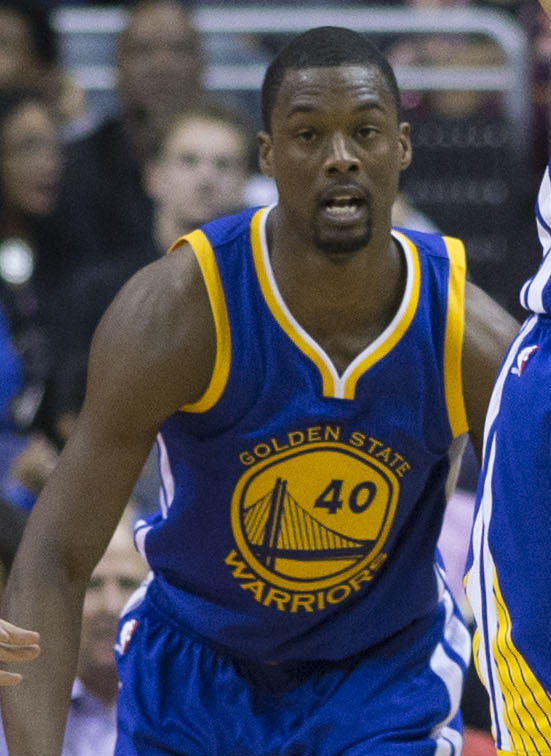
Harrison Barnes was selected seventh by the Golden State Warriors.

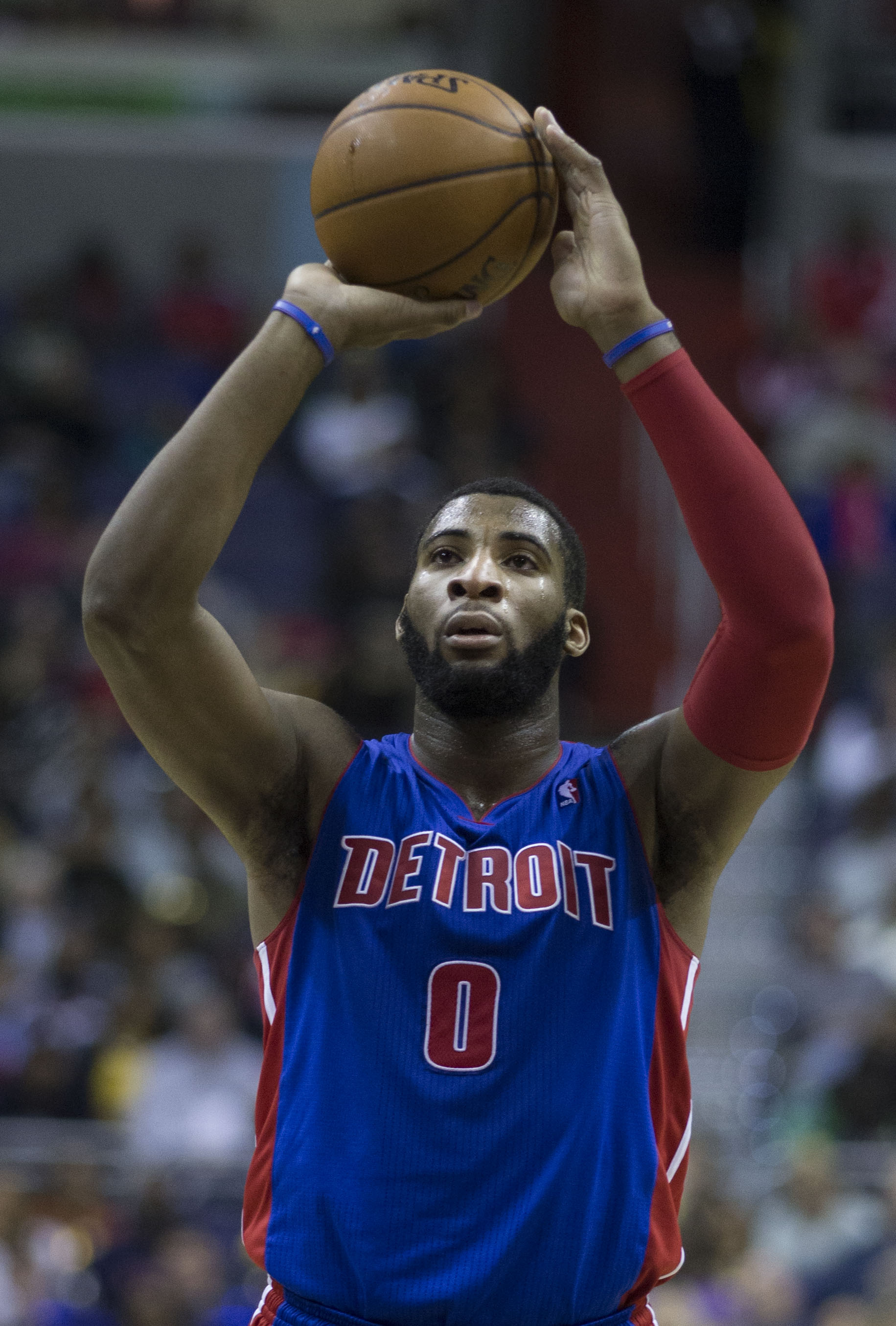
Andre Drummond was selected ninth by the Detroit Pistons.

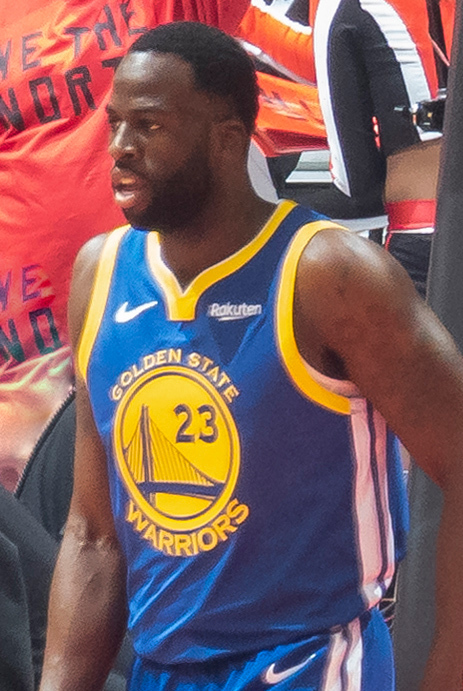
Draymond Green was selected thirty-fifth overall by the Golden State Warriors.

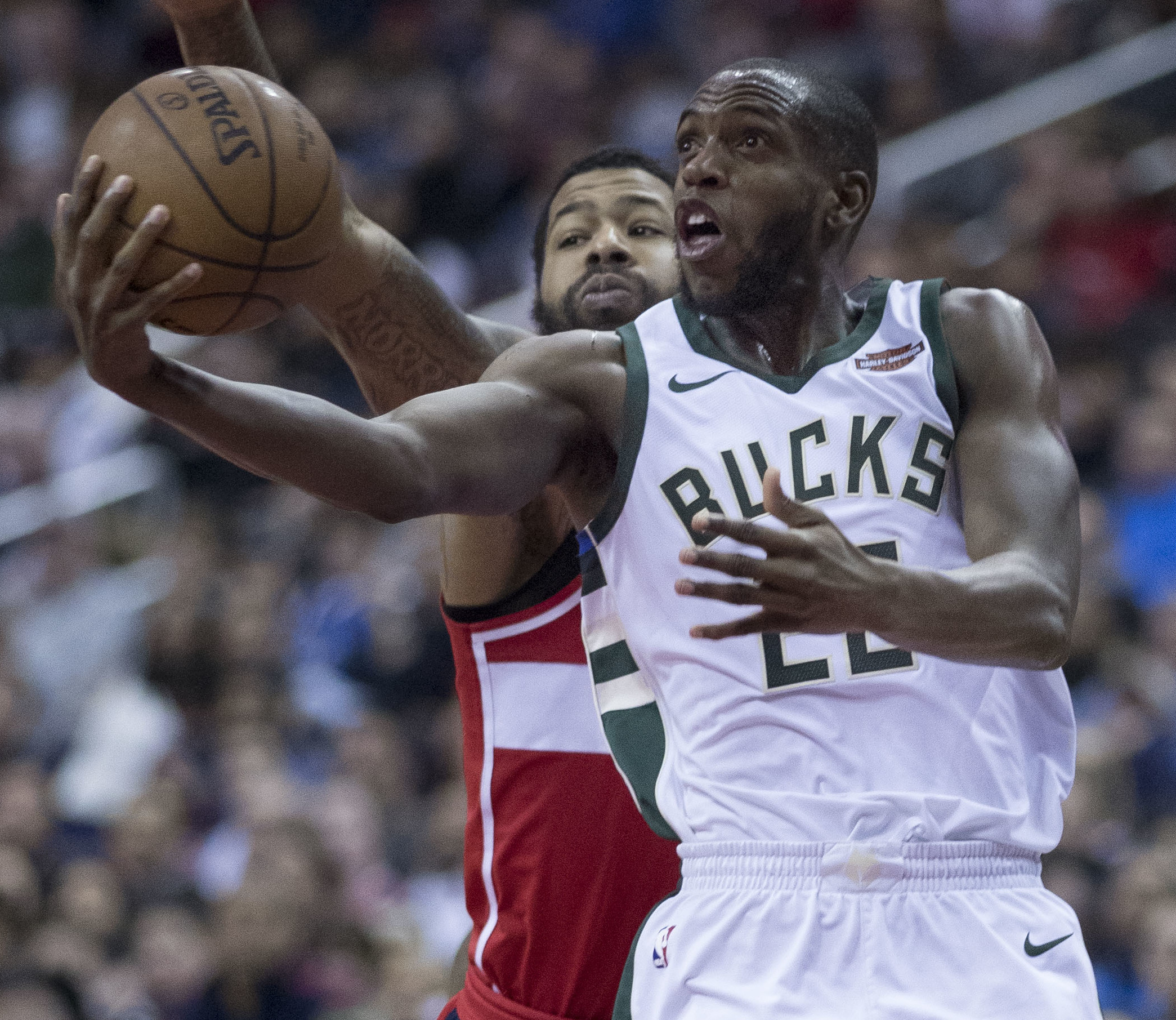
Khris Middleton was selected thirty-ninth by the Detroit Pistons.

Draft selections
Round	Pick	Player	Position	Nationality (Note: Nationality indicates the player's national team or representative nationality. If a player has not competed at the international level, then the nationality indicates the national team which the player is eligible to represent according to FIBA rules.)	Team	School/club team
1	1	Anthony Davis^{*}	PF/C	United States	New Orleans Hornets	Kentucky (Fr.)
1	2	Michael Kidd-Gilchrist	SF	United States	Charlotte Bobcats	Kentucky (Fr.)
1	3	Bradley Beal^{*}	SG	United States	Washington Wizards	Florida (Fr.)
1	4	Dion Waiters	SG	United States	Cleveland Cavaliers	Syracuse (So.)
1	5	Thomas Robinson	PF	United States	Sacramento Kings	Kansas (Jr.)
1	6	Damian Lillard^{‡}	PG	United States	Portland Trail Blazers (from Brooklyn) (Note: On March 15, 2012, the Portland Trail Blazers acquired Mehmet Okur, Shawne Williams and a future conditional first-round draft pick (the 6th pick) from the New Jersey Nets (now Brooklyn Nets) in exchange for Gerald Wallace.)	Weber St. (Jr.)
1	7	Harrison Barnes	SF	United States	Golden State Warriors	North Carolina (So.)
1	8	Terrence Ross	SG	United States	Toronto Raptors	Washington (So.)
1	9	Andre Drummond^{*}	C	United States	Detroit Pistons	Connecticut (Fr.)
1	10	Austin Rivers	SG	United States	New Orleans Hornets (from Minnesota via L.A. Clippers) (Note: On December 14, 2011, the New Orleans Hornets acquired Eric Gordon, Al-Farouq Aminu, Chris Kaman and Minnesota Timberwolves' 2012 first-round draft pick (the 10th pick) from the Los Angeles Clippers in exchange for Chris Paul and two 2015 second-round draft picks. Previously, on August 12, 2005, the Clippers acquired Sam Cassell and a future conditional first-round draft pick from the Timberwolves in exchange for Marko Jarić and Lionel Chalmers.)	Duke (Fr.)
1	11	Meyers Leonard	C	United States	Portland Trail Blazers	Illinois (So.)
1	12	Jeremy Lamb	SG	United States	Houston Rockets (from Milwaukee) (Note: On June 27, 2012, the Houston Rockets acquired Jon Brockman, Jon Leuer, Shaun Livingston and the 12th pick from the Milwaukee Bucks in exchange for Samuel Dalembert and the 14th pick.)	Connecticut (So.)
1	13	Kendall Marshall	PG	United States	Phoenix Suns	North Carolina (So.)
1	14	John Henson	PF	United States	Milwaukee Bucks (from Houston)	North Carolina (Jr.)
1	15	Maurice Harkless	SF	Puerto Rico (Note: While Maurice Harkless was born and raised in the mainland United States, his maternal grandfather is Puerto Rican. He has committed to represent Puerto Rico internationally since 2014.)	Philadelphia 76ers	St. John's (Fr.)
1	16	Royce White	PF	United States	Houston Rockets (from New York) (Note: On February 18, 2010, the Houston Rockets acquired Jordan Hill, Jared Jeffries, a future conditional first-round draft pick (the 16th pick) and the option to swap 2011 first-round draft picks from the New York Knicks in a three-team trade with the Knicks and the Sacramento Kings.)	Iowa St. (So.)
1	17	Tyler Zeller	C	United States	Dallas Mavericks (traded to Cleveland) (Note: The Cleveland Cavaliers acquired Kelenna Azubuike and the draft rights to 17th pick Tyler Zeller from the Dallas Mavericks in exchange for the draft rights to 24th pick Jared Cunningham, 33rd pick Bernard James and 34th pick Jae Crowder.)	North Carolina (Sr.)
1	18	Terrence Jones	PF	United States	Houston Rockets (from Utah via Minnesota) (Note: On June 26, 2012, the Houston Rockets acquired the 18th pick from the Minnesota Timberwolves in exchange for Chase Budinger and the draft rights to Lior Eliyahu. Previously, on July 14, 2010, the Timberwolves acquired Kosta Koufos, 2011 and 2012 conditional first-round draft picks from the Utah Jazz in exchange for Al Jefferson.)	Kentucky (So.)
1	19	Andrew Nicholson	PF	Canada	Orlando Magic	St. Bonaventure (Sr.)
1	20	Evan Fournier	SG	France	Denver Nuggets	Poitiers Basket (France)
1	21	Jared Sullinger	PF	United States	Boston Celtics	Ohio St. (So.)
1	22	Fab Melo	C	Brazil	Boston Celtics (from L.A. Clippers via Oklahoma City) (Note: On February 24, 2011, the Boston Celtics acquired Jeff Green, Nenad Krstić and Los Angeles Clippers' first-round draft pick (the 22nd pick) from the Oklahoma City Thunder in exchange for Kendrick Perkins and Nate Robinson. Previously, on June 24, 2010, the Thunder acquired a future conditional first-round draft pick from the Clippers in exchange for the draft rights to Eric Bledsoe.)	Syracuse (So.)
1	23	John Jenkins	SG	United States	Atlanta Hawks	Vanderbilt (Jr.)
1	24	Jared Cunningham	SG	United States	Cleveland Cavaliers (from L.A. Lakers, (Note: On March 15, 2012, the Cleveland Cavaliers acquired Jason Kapono, Luke Walton, a future conditional first-round draft pick (the 24th pick), the option to swap 2013 first-round draft picks and cash considerations from the Los Angeles Lakers in exchange for Ramon Sessions and Christian Eyenga.) traded to Dallas)	Oregon St. (Jr.)
1	25	Tony Wroten	PG	United States	Memphis Grizzlies	Washington (Fr.)
1	26	Miles Plumlee	C	United States	Indiana Pacers	Duke (Sr.)
1	27	Arnett Moultrie	PF	United States	Miami Heat (traded to Philadelphia) (Note: The Philadelphia 76ers acquired the draft rights to 27th pick Arnett Moultrie from the Miami Heat in exchange for the draft rights to 45th pick Justin Hamilton and a future first-round draft pick.)	Mississippi St. (Jr.)
1	28	Perry Jones III	SF	United States	Oklahoma City Thunder	Baylor (So.)
1	29	Marquis Teague	PG	United States	Chicago Bulls	Kentucky (Fr.)
1	30	Festus Ezeli	C	Nigeria (Note: Ezeli acquired American citizenship in 2019.)	Golden State Warriors (from San Antonio) (Note: On March 15, 2012, the Golden State Warriors acquired Richard Jefferson, T. J. Ford and a future conditional first-round draft pick (the 30th pick) from the San Antonio Spurs in exchange for Stephen Jackson.)	Vanderbilt (Sr.)
2	31	Jeffery Taylor	SF	Sweden (Note: Taylor was born in Sweden to an American father. He holds dual citizenship and plays for the Sweden national basketball team.)	Charlotte Bobcats	Vanderbilt (Sr.)
2	32	Tomáš Satoranský	PG	Czech Republic	Washington Wizards	Banca Cívica Sevilla (Spain)
2	33	Bernard James	C	United States	Cleveland Cavaliers (traded to Dallas)	Florida St. (Sr.)
2	34	Jae Crowder	SF	United States	Cleveland Cavaliers (from New Orleans via Miami, (Note: On July 9, 2010, the Cleveland Cavaliers acquired two future conditional first-round draft picks, Oklahoma City Thunder's future conditional second-round draft pick, New Orleans Hornets' 2012 second-round draft pick (the 34th pick) and the option to swap 2012 first-round draft picks from the Miami Heat in exchange for LeBron James. Previously, on June 25, 2009, the Heat acquired 2010 and 2012 second-round draft picks from the Hornets in exchange for the draft rights to Marcus Thornton.) traded to Dallas)	Marquette (Sr.)
2	35	Draymond Green^{*}	PF	United States	Golden State Warriors (from Brooklyn) (Note: On February 23, 2011, the Golden State Warriors acquired Troy Murphy and a 2012 second-round draft pick (the 35th pick) from the New Jersey Nets (now Brooklyn Nets) in exchange for Brandan Wright and Dan Gadzuric.)	Michigan St. (Sr.)
2	36	Orlando Johnson	SG	United States	Sacramento Kings (traded to Indiana) (Note: The Indiana Pacers acquired the draft rights to 36th pick Orlando Johnson from the Sacramento Kings in exchange for cash considerations.)	UC Santa Barbara (Sr.)
2	37	Quincy Acy	PF	United States	Toronto Raptors	Baylor (Sr.)
2	38	Quincy Miller	SF	United States	Denver Nuggets (from Golden State via New York) (Note: On February 22, 2011, the Denver Nuggets acquired Wilson Chandler, Raymond Felton, Danilo Gallinari, Timofey Mozgov, a 2014 first-round draft pick, Golden State Warriors' 2012 (the 38th pick) and 2013 second-round draft picks, the option to swap 2016 first-round draft picks and cash considerations from the New York Knicks in a three-team trade with the Knicks and the Minnesota Timberwolves. Previously, on July 9, 2010, the Knicks acquired Anthony Randolph, Kelenna Azubuike, Ronny Turiaf and two-second-round draft picks from the Warriors in exchange for David Lee.)	Baylor (Fr.)
2	39	Khris Middleton^{+}	SF	United States	Detroit Pistons	Texas A&M (Jr.)
2	40	Will Barton	SG	United States	Portland Trail Blazers (from Minnesota via Houston) (Note: On March 15, 2012, the Portland Trail Blazers acquired Jonny Flynn, Hasheem Thabeet and Minnesota Timberwolves' second-round draft pick (the 40th pick) from the Houston Rockets in exchange for Marcus Camby. Previously, on June 24, 2011, the Rockets acquired Jonny Flynn, the draft rights to Donatas Motiejūnas and a future conditional second-round draft pick from the Timberwolves in exchange for Brad Miller, the draft rights to Nikola Mirotić, the draft rights to Chandler Parsons and a future conditional first-round draft pick.)	Memphis (So.)
2	41	Tyshawn Taylor	PG	United States	Portland Trail Blazers (traded to Brooklyn) (Note: The Brooklyn Nets acquired the draft rights to 41st pick Tyshawn Taylor from the Portland Trail Blazers in exchange for cash considerations.)	Kansas (Sr.)
2	42	Doron Lamb	SG	United States	Milwaukee Bucks	Kentucky (So.)
2	43	Mike Scott	PF	United States	Atlanta Hawks (from Phoenix) (Note: On July 14, 2010, the Atlanta Hawks acquired a 2012 second-round draft pick (the 43rd pick) from the Phoenix Suns in exchange for Josh Childress.)	Virginia (Sr.)
2	44	Kim English	SG	United States	Detroit Pistons (from Houston) (Note: On June 25, 2009, the Detroit Pistons acquired a future conditional second-round draft pick (the 44th pick) and cash considerations from the Houston Rockets in exchange for the draft rights to Chase Budinger.)	Missouri (Sr.)
2	45	Justin Hamilton	C	United States	Philadelphia 76ers (traded to Miami)	LSU (Jr.)
2	46	Darius Miller	SF	United States	New Orleans Hornets (from Dallas via Washington) (Note: On June 20, 2012, the New Orleans Hornets acquired Rashard Lewis and the 46th pick from the Washington Wizards in exchange for Trevor Ariza and Emeka Okafor. Previously, on December 10, 2011, the Wizards acquired a 2012 second-round draft pick from the Dallas Mavericks in a three-team trade with the Mavericks and the New York Knicks.)	Kentucky (Sr.)
2	47	Kevin Murphy	SG	United States	Utah Jazz	Tennessee Tech (Sr.)
2	48	Kostas Papanikolaou	SF	Greece	New York Knicks	Olympiacos (Greece)
2	49	Kyle O'Quinn	PF	United States	Orlando Magic	Norfolk St. (Sr.)
2	50	İzzet Türkyılmaz^{#}	PF	Turkey	Denver Nuggets	Banvit (Turkey)
2	51	Kris Joseph	SF	Canada	Boston Celtics	Syracuse (Sr.)
2	52	Ognjen Kuzmić	C	Serbia (Note: Ognjen Kuzmić was born in SR Bosnia-Herzegovina, SFR Yugoslavia (now Bosnia and Herzegovina), but has represented Serbia internationally since 2014.)	Golden State Warriors (from Atlanta) (Note: On March 15, 2012, the Golden State Warriors acquired a 2012 second-round draft pick (the 52nd pick) from the Atlanta Hawks in exchange for cash considerations.)	Clinicas Rincón (Spain)
2	53	Furkan Aldemir	PF	Turkey	Los Angeles Clippers	Galatasaray (Turkey)
2	54	Tornike Shengelia	PF	Georgia	Philadelphia 76ers (from Memphis, (Note: On January 4, 2012, the Philadelphia 76ers acquired a future conditional second-round draft pick (the 54th pick) from the Memphis Grizzlies in a three-team trade with the Grizzlies and the New Orleans Hornets.) traded to Brooklyn) (Note: The Brooklyn Nets acquired the draft rights to 54th pick Tornike Shengelia from the Philadelphia 76ers in exchange for cash considerations.)	Spirou Charleroi (Belgium)
2	55	Darius Johnson-Odom	SG	United States	Dallas Mavericks (from L.A. Lakers, (Note: On December 11, 2011, the Dallas Mavericks acquired Lamar Odom and a 2012 second-round draft pick (the 55th pick) from the Los Angeles Lakers in exchange for a future first-round draft pick.) traded back to the L.A. Lakers) (Note: The Los Angeles Lakers acquired the draft rights to 55th pick Darius Johnson-Odom from the Dallas Mavericks in exchange for cash considerations.)	Marquette (Sr.)
2	56	Tomislav Zubčić^{#}	PF	Croatia	Toronto Raptors (from Indiana) (Note: On March 15, 2012, the Toronto Raptors acquired a 2012 second-round draft pick (the 56th pick) and cash considerations from the Indiana Pacers in exchange for Leandro Barbosa.)	Cibona Zagreb (Croatia)
2	57	İlkan Karaman^{#}	PF	Turkey	Brooklyn Nets (from Miami) (Note: On January 5, 2009, the New Jersey Nets (now Brooklyn Nets) acquired Chris Quinn and a 2012 second-round draft pick (the 57th pick) from the Miami Heat in exchange for a future conditional second-round draft pick.)	Pınar Karşıyaka (Turkey)
2	58	Robbie Hummel	SF	United States	Minnesota Timberwolves (from Oklahoma City) (Note: On December 13, 2011, the Minnesota Timberwolves acquired Robert Vaden, a 2012 second-round draft pick (the 58th pick) and a future conditional second-round draft pick from the Oklahoma City Thunder in exchange for Lazar Hayward.)	Purdue (Sr.)
2	59	Marcus Denmon^{#}	PG	United States	San Antonio Spurs	Missouri (Sr.)
2	60	Robert Sacre	C	Canada (Note: Robert Sacre was born in the United States to an American father and a Canadian mother. He has represented Canada internationally since 2010.)	Los Angeles Lakers (from Chicago via Milwaukee and Brooklyn) (Note: On December 15, 2010, the Los Angeles Lakers acquired Joe Smith, Golden State Warriors' 2011 second-round draft pick and Chicago Bulls' 2012 second-round draft pick (the 60th pick) from the New Jersey Nets (now Brooklyn Nets) in a three-team trade with the Nets and the Houston Rockets. Previously, on June 25, 2010, the Nets acquired the second-round draft pick from the Milwaukee Bucks in exchange for Chris Douglas-Roberts. Previously, on February 18, 2010, the Bucks acquired John Salmons, 2011 and 2012 second-round draft picks and the option to swap 2010 first-round draft picks from the Bulls in exchange for Hakim Warrick and Joe Alexander.)	Gonzaga (Sr.)

== Notable undrafted players ==
These players were not selected in the 2012 NBA Draft but have played at least one game in the NBA.

Notable undrafted players
Player	Position	Nationality	School/club team
Kent Bazemore	SG/SF	United States	Old Dominion (Sr.)
Drew Gordon	PF	United States	New Mexico (Sr.)
JaMychal Green	PF/C	United States	Alabama (Sr.)
Jorge Gutiérrez	PG/SG	Mexico	California (Sr.)
Mike James	PG	United States	Lamar (Sr.)
Chris Johnson	SF/SG	United States	Dayton (Sr.)
DeQuan Jones	SF/SG	United States	Miami (FL) (Sr.)
Kevin Jones	PF	United States	West Virginia (Sr.)
Nicolás Laprovíttola	PG	Argentina (Note: Laprovíttola also holds an Italian passport.)	Club Atlético Lanús (Argentina)
Scott Machado	PG	Brazil (Note: Machado was born in the United States to Brazilian parents. He holds dual citizenship and plays for the Brazil national basketball team.)	Iona (Sr.)
Josh Magette	PG	United States	Alabama–Huntsville (Sr.)
Tony Mitchell	SF	United States (Note: Mitchell acquired Libyan citizenship in 2023.)	Alabama (Jr.)
Toure' Murry	SG/PG	United States	Wichita State (Sr.)
James Nunnally	SF/SG	United States	UC Santa Barbara (Sr.)
Jonathon Simmons	SG/SF	United States	Houston (Jr.)
Henry Sims	PF/C	United States	Georgetown (Sr.)
Chris Smith	PG	United States (Note: Smith acquired Israeli citizenship in 2017.)	Louisville (Sr.)
Hollis Thompson	SF/SG	United States	Georgetown (Jr.)
Casper Ware	PG	United States	Long Beach State (Sr.)
Maalik Wayns	PG	United States (Note: Wayns became a naturalized citizen of Belarus in 2016. He played for the Belarus national basketball team.)	Villanova (Jr.)
C. J. Williams	SG	United States	NC State (Sr.)

== Draft lottery ==
The first 14 picks in the draft belong to teams that missed the playoffs; the order was determined through a lottery. The lottery was only used to determine the teams that obtained the first three picks in the draft. The remaining first-round picks and the second-round picks were assigned to teams in reverse order of their win–loss record in the previous season. To determine the top three picks, fourteen ping pong balls numbered 1–14 were placed into a lottery machine. Four random balls were selected for each of the three picks and there were a total of 1,001 combinations. The lottery was weighted so that the teams with the worst records had better chances at the first pick. For example, the Charlotte Bobcats had the worst record from the previous season, so they were assigned 250 of the 1,001 combinations, which meant they had a 25% chance of getting the first pick.

The lottery was held on May 30, 2012, in the Disney/ABC Times Square Studio in New York City. The New Orleans Hornets won the rights to the first overall selection with a 13.7% chance to win. The Hornets were a league-owned team at the time, leading to continued conspiracy theories about the lottery process. The Bobcats won the second overall pick despite having the highest odds to win the lottery.

Below were the chances for each team to get specific picks in the 2012 draft lottery, rounded to three decimal places.

Key
^	Denotes the actual lottery results

Draft lottery results
Team	2011–12 record	Lottery chances	Pick													
Team	2011–12 record	Lottery chances	1st	2nd	3rd	4th	5th	6th	7th	8th	9th	10th	11th	12th	13th	14th
Charlotte Bobcats	7–59	250	.250	.215^	.177	.358	—	—	—	—	—	—	—	—	—	—
Washington Wizards	20–46	199	.199	.188	.171^	.319	.124	—	—	—	—	—	—	—	—	—
Cleveland Cavaliers	21–45	138	.138	.143	.145	.238^	.290	.046	—	—	—	—	—	—	—	—
New Orleans Hornets	21–45	137	.137^	.141	.145	.085	.323	.156	.013	—	—	—	—	—	—	—
Sacramento Kings	22–44	76	.076	.084	.095	—	.262^	.385	.094	.004	—	—	—	—	—	—
Brooklyn Nets	22–44	75	.075	.083	.094	—	—	.414^	.294	.039	.001	—	—	—	—	—
Golden State Warriors	23–43	36	.036	.042	.049	—	—	—	.600^	.253	.021	.000	—	—	—	—
Toronto Raptors	23–43	35	.035	.040	.048	—	—	—	—	.704^	.165	.008	.000	—	—	—
Detroit Pistons	25–41	17	.017	.020	.024	—	—	—	—	—	.813^	.122	.004	.000	—	—
Minnesota Timberwolves	26–40	11	.011	.013	.016	—	—	—	—	—	—	.870^	.089	.002	.000	—
Portland Trail Blazers	28–38	8	.008	.009	.012	—	—	—	—	—	—	—	.907^	.063	.001	.000
Milwaukee Bucks	31–35	7	.007	.008	.010	—	—	—	—	—	—	—	—	.935^	.039	.000
Phoenix Suns	33–33	6	.006	.007	.009	—	—	—	—	—	—	—	—	—	.960^	.018
Houston Rockets	34–32	5	.005	.006	.007	—	—	—	—	—	—	—	—	—	—	.982^

1: Brooklyn Nets' pick was conveyed to the Portland Trail Blazers.
2: Minnesota Timberwolves' pick was conveyed to the New Orleans Hornets via the Los Angeles Clippers.

== Eligibility rules ==
The draft was conducted under the eligibility rules established in the league's now-expired 2005 collective bargaining agreement (CBA) with its players union. The CBA that ended the 2011 lockout instituted no immediate changes to the draft, but called for a committee of owners and players to discuss future changes. The basic eligibility rules for the draft are listed below:

- All drafted players must be at least 19 years old during the calendar year of the draft. In terms of dates, players eligible for the 2012 draft must be born on or before December 31, 1993.
- Any player who is not an "international player", as defined in the CBA, must be at least one year removed from the graduation of his high school class. The CBA defines "international players" as players who permanently resided outside the U.S. for three years prior to the draft, did not complete high school in the U.S., and have never enrolled at a U.S. college or university.
- The basic requirement for automatic eligibility for a U.S. player is the completion of his college eligibility. Players who meet the CBA definition of "international players" are automatically eligible if their 22nd birthday falls during or before the calendar year of the draft (i.e., born on or before December 31, 1990). U.S. players who were at least one year removed from their high school graduation and have played minor-league basketball with a team outside the NBA are also automatically eligible.
- A player who is not automatically eligible must declare his eligibility for the draft by notifying the NBA offices in writing no later than 60 days before the draft. For the 2012 draft, this date fell on April 29. Under NCAA rules, players will only have until April 10 to withdraw from the draft and maintain their college eligibility.

A player who has hired an agent will forfeit his remaining college eligibility, regardless of whether he is drafted. Also, while the CBA allows a player to withdraw from the draft twice, the NCAA mandates that a player who has declared twice loses his college eligibility.

== Entrants ==
=== Early entrants ===
On May 3, 2012, the league announced a list of 67 early entry candidates which consisted of 50 collegiate players and 17 international players. At the withdrawal deadline, 11 early entry candidates withdrew from the draft, leaving 49 collegiate players and 7 international players as the early entry candidates for the draft.

==== College underclassmen ====
(All players are Americans except as indicated.)

- Erik Austin – F, Jackson College (sophomore)
- Harrison Barnes – SF, North Carolina (sophomore)
- Will Barton – G, Memphis (sophomore)
- Bradley Beal – G, Florida (freshman)
- J'Covan Brown – G, Texas (junior)
- Dominic Cheek – G, Villanova (junior)
- Jared Cunningham – G, Oregon State (junior)
- Anthony Davis – F/C, Kentucky (freshman)
- Andre Drummond – C, Connecticut (freshman)
- Dominique Ferguson – F, Florida International (sophomore)
- Justin Hamilton – C, LSU (junior)
- Maurice Harkless – F, St. John's (freshman)
- John Henson – F, North Carolina (junior)
- John Jenkins – SG, Vanderbilt (junior)
- Perry Jones III – F, Baylor (sophomore)
- Terrence Jones – F, Kentucky (sophomore)
- Xavier Jones – G, Missouri State-West Plains (freshman)
- Michael Kidd-Gilchrist – G, Kentucky (freshman)
- Doron Lamb – G, Kentucky (sophomore)
- Jeremy Lamb – G/F, Connecticut (sophomore)
- Meyers Leonard – C, Illinois (sophomore)
- Damian Lillard – G, Weber State (junior)
- Kendall Marshall – PG, North Carolina (sophomore)
- (Brazil) Fab Melo – C, Syracuse (sophomore)
- Khris Middleton – F, Texas A&M (junior)
- Quincy Miller – F, Baylor (freshman)
- Tony Mitchell – SF, Alabama (junior)
- Arnett Moultrie – F/C, Mississippi State (junior)
- Reeves Nelson – F, UCLA (junior)
  - Nelson left the Bruins in December 2011 and had been playing professionally for Žalgiris Kaunas (Lithuania) before declaring for the draft.
- Austin Rivers – G, Duke (freshman)
- Peter Roberson – C, Alabama (junior)
- Quincy Roberts – G, Grambling State (junior)
- Thomas Robinson – PF, Kansas (junior)
- Terrence Ross – G, Washington (sophomore)
- Avery Scharer – G, Shoreline CC (WA) (sophomore)
- Renardo Sidney – F, Mississippi State (junior)
- Jonathon Simmons – G, Houston (junior)
- Terrell Stoglin – G, Maryland (sophomore)
- (Dominican Republic) Gerardo Suero – G, Albany (junior)
- Jared Sullinger – PF, Ohio State (sophomore)
- Marquis Teague – G, Kentucky (freshman)
- Joston Thomas – F, Hawaiʻi (junior)
- Hollis Thompson – F, Georgetown (junior)
- Rich Townsend-Gant – F, Vancouver Island U (junior)
- Dion Waiters – G, Syracuse (sophomore)
- Maalik Wayns – PG, Villanova (junior)
- Royce White – F, Iowa State (sophomore)
- D'Angelo Williams – G, Notre Dame (CA) (junior)
- Tony Wroten – G, Washington (freshman)

==== International players ====
International players
Player	Position	Nationality	Team
Furkan Aldemir	F/C	Turkey	Galatasaray (Turkey)
Evan Fournier	G/F	France	Poitiers Basket 86 (France)
Josep Franch	G	Spain	Murcia (Spain)
Alen Omić	C	Slovenia	Zlatorog (Slovenia)
Tomáš Satoranský	G	Czech Republic	Banca Cívica (Spain)
Tornike Shengelia	F	Georgia	Spirou Charleroi (Belgium)
Mathieu Wojciechowski	F	France	BCM Gravelines (France)
Moala Tautuaa	F	Philippines	Westports Malaysia Dragons (Malaysia)

=== Automatically eligible entrants ===
Players who do not meet the criteria for "international" players are automatically eligible if they meet any of the following criteria:

- They have completed 4 years of their college eligibility.
- If they graduated from high school in the U.S., but did not enroll in a U.S. college or university, four years have passed since their high school class graduated.
- They have signed a contract with a professional basketball team outside the NBA, anywhere in the world, and have played under that contract.

Players who meet the criteria for "international" players are automatically eligible if they meet any of the following criteria:

- They are least 22 years old during the calendar year of the draft. In terms of dates, players born on or before December 31, 1990, are automatically eligible for the 2012 draft.
- They have signed a contract with a professional basketball team outside the NBA within the United States, and have played under that contract.

== Invited attendees ==
The NBA annually invites top prospects to the "green room", a staging area at the draft site where players, their families, and agents wait for the draft picks to be announced. For this draft, 14 players were invited to attend in person. All 14 players represented the United States.

- Harrison Barnes, North Carolina
- Bradley Beal, Florida
- Anthony Davis, Kentucky
- Andre Drummond, Connecticut
- John Henson, North Carolina
- Michael Kidd-Gilchrist, Kentucky
- Jeremy Lamb, Connecticut
- Meyers Leonard, Illinois
- Damian Lillard, Weber State
- Austin Rivers, Duke
- Thomas Robinson, Kansas
- Terrence Ross, Washington
- Dion Waiters, Syracuse
- Tyler Zeller, North Carolina

== Trades involving draft picks ==
=== Pre-draft trades ===
Prior to the day of the draft, the following trades were made and resulted in exchanges of draft picks between the teams.

=== Draft-day trades ===
The following trades involving drafted players were made on the day of the draft

== See also ==
- List of first overall NBA draft picks
