= European Federation of Sports Medicine Associations =

- Formation: 1997
- Headquarters: Portugal
- Website: https://www.efsma.org/

The European Federation of Sports Medicine Associations or EFSMA is the main Europe-wide sports medicine organization. The organization was founded in 1997 in Portugal. It is headquartered at the Maison du Sport International in Lausanne.

== History ==
Sports medicine, internationally, is represented by the Fédération Internationale de Medicine Sportive. It was founded in Portugal at a congress of the FIMS.

== Function ==
Its official journal is the European Journal of Sports Medicine.

== See also ==
- British Journal of Sports Medicine (BJSM)
- European Academy of Sciences and Arts
- American College of Sports Medicine
