= Teuku Karimoeddin =

Indonesian professor of public health

Dean of the University of Indonesia Faculty of Public Health
- In office 1970–1972
- Preceded by: Sajono Sumodidjojo
- Succeeded by: Iwan Soetjahja

Personal details
- Born: 30 April 1919 North Aceh, Aceh, Dutch East Indies
- Died: 23 September 1991 (aged 72) Jakarta, Indonesia
- Spouse: Siti Chairani
- Children: 4
- Education: Djakarta Ika Daigaku (dr.); University of California, Berkeley (MPH); University of Indonesia (Prof.)

Academic work
- Discipline: Public health
- Sub-discipline: Occupational safety and health

Teuku Karimoeddin (30 April 1919 – 23 September 1991) was an Indonesian physician, labor health expert, and a professor of public health at the University of Indonesia (UI). Karimoeddin played a vital role in shaping Indonesia's health policies for workers and athletes and contributed significantly to the development of public health education in Indonesia. He also served in a number of academic and organization position, including as the dean of the University of Indonesia's public health faculty from 1970 to 1972 and chairman of the Indonesian Sports Health Association from 1970 to 1978. He also served as the chief of occupational safety and health in Indonesia's ministry of labor under different nomenclatures from 1958 to 1975.

== Early life and education ==
Teuku Karimoeddin was born on 30 April 1919 Teupin Punti, a small village in North Aceh, as the only son of Teukoe Banta Gading and Cut Sabi. He spent his childhood in Lhokseumawe, Aceh, where he completed his primary education at the Hollandsch-Inlandsche School (HIS) in 1930. At a young age, he demonstrated a keen interest in sports, particularly football, alongside his religious studies in Qur'anic recitation. After HIS, he continued his education at the Meer Uitgebreid Lager Onderwijs (MULO) in Kutaraja (now Banda Aceh, graduating in 1936. His academic interests were broad, with a particular affinity for mathematics, physics, and languages, which later influenced his focus on the health of athletes and his involvement in sports organizations.

Karimoeddin's pursuit of higher education led him to Batavia (now Jakarta), where he attended the Algemene Middelbare School (AMS B), completing his studies as World War II began in Europe. Initially considering a career in mechanical engineering, he ultimately chose to study medicine at the Geneeskundige Hoogeschool (GHS), the medical school in Batavia, from 1939, due to his strengths in physics, chemistry, and mathematics. During his university years, Karimoeddin was actively involved in student organizations, politics, and sports. He was a member of the Unitas Studiosorum Indonesiansis (USI), one of only two major student extracurricular organizations in Batavia at the time.

The Japanese occupation of the Dutch East Indies brought significant disruptions, including the closure and subsequent reopening of GHS as Djakarta Ika Daigaku (ジャカルタ医科大学). Karimoeddin, along with other students, resisted Japanese-imposed regulations, such as the mandatory shaving of heads, an act of defiance that was reported by Radio Australia. His resistance led to his detention and suspension for three months by Kempeitai, the Japanese military police, for alleged subversive activities. He was later pardoned and allowed to complete his medical studies.

Karimoeddin's political engagement deepened as he became a member of the secretariat of the Union of Indonesian Students (Baperpi, Badan Perkumpulan Pelajar Indonesia), a student organization active in the movement for Indonesian independence. Upon learning the surrender of Japan on 15 August 1945, Karimoeddin along with Wikana (later sports minister) and Darius (full name unknown), visited the-then chairman of the Preparatory Committee for Indonesian Independence Sukarno to urge him to proclaim Indonesia's independence the next day. However, the student delegation failed to convince Sukarno to proclaim independence, prompting student activist Chairul Saleh to kidnap Sukarno to coerce him to proclaim independence. Sukarno eventually proclaimed independence on 17 August.

== Career ==
After graduating as a physician following the Proclamation, Karimoeddin registered with the Ministry of Health and was initially assigned as a physician in Palembang's central hospital. Due to transportation difficulties, he served at Yogyakarta's central hospital until January 1947, before finally taking up his post at Palembang's central hospital. The Dutch's Operation Product and occupation of Palembang forced him to leave the hospital, as he refused to collaborate with the Dutch authorities. He then established a private practice and became the head of the Palembang branch of the Indonesian Red Cross, while also serving as chairman of the Oil Workers' Union.

During the Dutch's Operation Kraai in December 1948, Karimoeddin was detained by the Dutch for six months due to his influential role in the labor movement, despite the Roem–Van Roijen Agreement mandating the release of political prisoners. Upon his release, he returned to Aceh, working at Sigli's central hospital until 1951. He then moved to Jakarta to join the Eijkman Institute. From 1952 to 1953, he pursued his master's degree in public health at the UC Berkeley School of Public Health.

Karimoeddin's experiences as a union leader shifted his focus from surgery to labor and occupational health. Upon his return from the United States, he became a physician-advisor at the Ministry of Labor. After four years working in the ministry, in January 1958 Karimoeddin was appointed as director of labor health in the ministry. He continued to hold a number of positions relating to occupational safety and health in the ministry, such as the general director of the occupational safety and health agency from April 1965 to 1966, director of occupational protection and safety norms from 1966 to 1970, director of occupational safety supervision from 1970 to 1972, and as the director of labor protection norms from 1972 until his retirement in 1975. In 1972, he became secretary of Indonesia's delegation for the 1972 Stockholm Conference on the Human Environment, working alongside Emil Salim to prepare the Indonesian delegation.

== Academic career ==
Karimoeddin was a key figure in the establishment of the Faculty of Public Health at the University of Indonesia, where he was appointed as a full professor in public health on 1 July 1965, along with the Dradjat Prawiranegara and Bagiastra. The faculty was established on the same day as their appointment as full professors, and all three of them were appointed as deputy deans to assist dean Sajono Sumodidjojo, with Karimoeddin being responsible for student affairs. After Sajono Sumodidjojo's term as dean expired in 1970, Karimoeddin succeeded him and served until 1972.

== Sports medicine ==
Karimoeddin played a significant role as contributions to sports medicine in Indonesia. He was instrumental in founding the Indonesian Sports Health Association, serving as its chairman from 1970 to 1978 and later as honorary chairman. His most notable achievement in this field was the establishment of the Sport Medical Centre in Senayan, Jakarta. Internationally, he facilitated Indonesia's membership in the International Federation of Sports Medicine in 1972 and served as a medical officer for Indonesian sports delegations, including as a doctor for the Indonesian Boxing Association. He regularly attended the Olympics and other major sporting events, as well as international sports congresses, from 1963 onwards.

== Later life and death ==
After his retirement, Karimoeddin continued his activity in public health and academia. He became the deputy dean of the Tarumanagara University's medicine faculty and served as health and safety advisor to Bechtel and the Jiwasraya Insurance. He died on the morning of 23 September 1991 at his house in Central Jakarta and was interred at the Karet Bivak public cemetery.

== Personal life ==
Karimoeddin married Siti Chairani and had two sons and two daughter.
