= Clément Frisch =

French basketball player (born 2002)

- Frisch with Baskonia in 2026

No. 25 – Baskonia
- Position: Power forward
- League: Liga ACB; EuroLeague

Personal information
- Born: January 7, 2002 (age 24) Decize, France
- Listed height: 2.01 m (6 ft 7 in)
- Listed weight: 100 kg (220 lb)

Career information
- NBA draft: 2024: undrafted
- Playing career: 2020–present

Career history
- 2020–2023: SIG Strasbourg
- 2021–2022: →Denain
- 2022–2023: →SLUC Nancy
- 2023–2025: SLUC Nancy
- 2025–present: Baskonia

Career highlights
- Spanish Cup winner (2026)

Clément Frisch (born January 7, 2002) is a French professional basketball player for Baskonia of the Liga ACB and the EuroLeague. Standing at a height of 2.01 m (6 ft 7 in), Frisch plays as a power forward.

== Early life and youth career ==
Born in Decize, Frisch grew up in Illkirch-Graffenstaden in the Alsace region. Frisch played for local clubs like Strasbourg Électricité AS and Strasbourg Saint-Joseph before enrolling in SIG Strasbourg's academy.

== Professional career ==
=== SIG Strasbourg (2020–2023) ===
Frisch made his professional debut with SIG Strasbourg during the 2020–21 Pro A season, mainly playing with Strasbourg's reserve team in the U21 French championship. In May 2021, Frisch was selected MVP of the 2020–21 Espoirs Championship, the U21 competition for LNB Élite reserve teams. In July 2021, Frisch signed his first professional contract with Strasbourg.

In July 2021, Frisch was loaned out to Denain of the LNB Pro B. With Denain, Frisch won the Best Young Player award for the 2021–22 LNB Pro B season.

In May 2022, Frisch joined SLUC Nancy on loan from Strasbourg.

=== SLUC Nancy (2023–2025) ===
In June 2023, Frisch rejoined SLUC Nancy, signing a two-season deal. In September 2024, he signed a contract extension for two more seasons with Nancy. In May 2025, Frisch won the LNB Élite Most Improved Player award for the 2024–25 LNB Élite season.

=== Baskonia (2025–present) ===
On June 25, 2025, Frisch signed with Baskonia of the Liga ACB and the EuroLeague, signing a three-season deal.

== Career statistics ==
Legend
| GP | Games played | GS | Games started | MPG | Minutes per game |
| FG% | Field goal percentage | 3P% | 3-point field goal percentage | FT% | Free throw percentage |
| RPG | Rebounds per game | APG | Assists per game | SPG | Steals per game |
| BPG | Blocks per game | PPG | Points per game | **Bold** | Career high |

=== EuroLeague ===
| Year | Team | GP | GS | MPG | FG% | 3P% | FT% | RPG | APG | SPG | BPG | PPG | PIR |
|---|---|---|---|---|---|---|---|---|---|---|---|---|---|
| 2025–26 | Baskonia | 37 | 3 | 12.2 | .544 | .424 | 1.000 | 2.5 | .5 | .3 | .1 | 4.3 | 4.8 |
| Career | | 37 | 3 | 12.2 | .544 | .424 | 1.000 | 2.5 | .5 | .3 | .1 | 4.3 | 4.8 |

=== Domestic leagues ===
| Year | Team | League | GP | MPG | FG% | 3P% | FT% | RPG | APG | SPG | BPG | PPG |
|---|---|---|---|---|---|---|---|---|---|---|---|---|
| 2025–26 | (Spain) Baskonia | ACB | 34 | 12.4 | .381 | .378 | .833 | 2.7 | .4 | .4 | .1 | 3.9 |
