= 2011–12 Pro A season =

2011–12 LNB Pro A season
- League: LNB Pro A
- Sport: Basketball
- Games: 240 (regular season)
- Teams: 16
- TV partner: Sport+

Regular Season
- Top seed: Gravelines-Dunkerque
- Season MVP: (Czech Republic) Blake Schilb (Chalon-sur-Saône) (France) Fabien Causeur (Cholet)
- Top scorer: (United States) Eric Chatfield (Paris-Levallois)

2011-12 Finals
- Champions: Chalon-sur-Saône
- Runners-up: Le Mans
- Finals MVP: (Czech Republic) Blake Schilb

LNB Pro A seasons
- ← 2010–11 2012–13 →

The 2011–12 LNB Pro A season is the 90th season of the French Basketball Championship and the 25th season since inception of the Ligue Nationale de Basketball (LNB). The regular season starts on October 7, 2011, and ends on May 16, 2012. The play-offs are held from May 23, 2012, until June 16, 2012.

== Promotion and relegation ==
At the beginning of the 2011–12 season

Teams promoted from 2010 to 2011 Pro B (French 2nd basketball division)

- Nanterre (Champion)
- Dijon (2nd)

Teams relegated to 2011–12 Pro B

- Vichy (15th)
- Limoges (16th)

At the end of the 2011–12 season

- 2011-12 Pro A champion: Chalon-sur-Saône

Teams promoted from 2011 to 2012 Pro B

- Limoges (Champion)
- Boulazac (2nd)

Teams relegated to 2012–13 Pro B

- Pau-Lacq-Orthez (15th)
- Hyères-Toulon (16th)

== Team Arenas ==
Location of teams in Pro A League 2011–12

| Team | Home city | Stadium | Capacity |
|---|---|---|---|
| ÉS Chalon-sur-Saône | Chalon-sur-Saône | Le Colisée | 5,020 |
| Cholet Basket | Cholet | La Meilleraie | 5,191 |
| JDA Dijon | Dijon | Palais des Sports Jean-Michel Geoffroy | 5,000 |
| BCM Gravelines Dunkerque | Gravelines | Sportica | 3,500 |
| Hyères Toulon Var Basket | Hyères – Toulon | Palais des Sports de Toulon; Espace 3000 | 4,700; 2,200 |
| STB Le Havre | Le Havre | Salle des Docks Océane | 3,598 |
| Le Mans Sarthe Basket | Le Mans | Antarès | 6,003 |
| ASVEL Basket | Lyon – Villeurbanne | Astroballe | 5,643 |
| SLUC Nancy Basket | Nancy | Palais des Sports Jean Weille | 6,027 |
| JSF Nanterre | Nanterre | Palais des Sports de Nanterre | 3,000 |
| Orléans Loiret Basket | Orléans | Zénith d'Orléans | 5,338 |
| Paris-Levallois Basket | Paris – Levallois | Stade Pierre de Coubertin; Palais des Sports Marcel Cerdan | 4,200; 4,000 |
| Élan Béarnais Pau-Lacq-Orthez | Pau | Palais des Sports de Pau | 7,813 |
| Poitiers Basket 86 | Poitiers | Les Arènes | 4,300 |
| Chorale Roanne Basket | Roanne | Halle André Vacheresse | 5,020 |
| Strasbourg IG | Strasbourg | Rhénus Sport | 6,200 |

== Regular season ==
=== Team standings ===
| | Clinched playoff berth |
| | Relegated |
| Source | lnb.fr |

| # | Team | Pld | W | L | PF | PA |
|---|---|---|---|---|---|---|
| 1 | Gravelines-Dunkerque | 30 | 27 | 3 | 2377 | 1947 |
| 2 | Chalon-sur-Saône | 30 | 23 | 7 | 2294 | 2272 |
| 3 | Orléans | 30 | 21 | 9 | 2309 | 2119 |
| 4 | Le Mans | 30 | 19 | 11 | 2487 | 2359 |
| 5 | Nancy | 30 | 18 | 12 | 2374 | 2283 |
| 6 | Paris-Levallois | 30 | 17 | 13 | 2449 | 2438 |
| 7 | Roanne | 30 | 16 | 14 | 2287 | 2296 |
| 8 | Cholet | 30 | 16 | 14 | 2387 | 2320 |
| 9 | Dijon | 30 | 14 | 16 | 2099 | 2134 |
| 10 | Strasbourg | 30 | 14 | 16 | 2306 | 2241 |
| 11 | Nanterre | 30 | 14 | 16 | 2394 | 2413 |
| 12 | Lyon-Villeurbanne | 30 | 13 | 17 | 2142 | 2265 |
| 13 | Poitiers | 30 | 9 | 21 | 2174 | 2336 |
| 14 | Le Havre | 30 | 9 | 21 | 2315 | 2378 |
| 15 | Pau-Lacq-Orthez | 30 | 7 | 23 | 2270 | 2570 |
| 16 | Hyères-Toulon | 30 | 3 | 27 | 2266 | 2859 |

=== Stats Leaders ===
| Statistic | Player | Team | Average |
|---|---|---|---|
| Ranking per Game | (United States) Lamont Hamilton | Paris-Levallois | 20.75 |
| Points per Game | (United States) Eric Chatfield | Paris-Levallois | 19.79 |
| Rebounds per Game | (Nigeria) Chinemelu Elonu | Pau-Lacq-Orthez | 8.30 |
| Assists per Game | (United States) Kareem Reid | Hyères-Toulon | 7.56 |
| Steals per Game | (France) Andrew Albicy | Gravelines | 2.48 |
| Blocks per Game | (France) Alexis Ajinça | Strasbourg | 2.00 |

== Playoffs ==
This was the last season in which the championship final was contested as a one-off match. Starting in 2012–13, the final became a best-of-5 series.

Quarter Finals
1 | Gravelines-Dunkerque | 1
8 | Cholet | 2
4 | Le Mans | 2
5 | Nancy | 1
2 | Chalon-sur-Saône | 2
7 | Roanne | 0
3 | Orléans | 2
6 | Paris-Levallois | 0

Semifinals
8 | Cholet | 1
4 | Le Mans | 2
2 | Chalon-sur-Saône | 2
3 | Orléans | 1

Finals
4 | Le Mans | 76
2 | Chalon-sur-Saône | 95

== Awards ==
=== Regular season MVPs ===
- Foreign MVP : (Czech Republic) Blake Schilb (Chalon-sur-Saône)
- French MVP : (France) Fabien Causeur (Cholet)

=== Finals MVP ===
- (Czech Republic) Blake Schilb (Chalon-sur-Saône)

=== Best Coach ===
- (France) Gregor Beugnot (Chalon-sur-Saône)

=== Most Improved Player ===
- (France) Evan Fournier (Poitiers)

=== Best Defensive Player ===
- (France) Andrew Albicy (Gravelines-Dunkerque)

=== Rising Star Award ===
- (France) Evan Fournier (Poitiers)

=== Player of the month ===
| Month | Player | Team |
|---|---|---|
| October | (France) Tony Parker | Lyon-Villeurbanne |
| November | (France) Nicolas Batum | Nancy |
| December | (Montenegro) Taylor Rochestie | Le Mans |
| January | (France) Fabien Causeur | Cholet |
| February | (Czech Republic) Blake Schilb | Chalon-sur-Saône |
| March | (France) Evan Fournier | Poitiers |
| April | (United States) Patrick Christopher | Cholet |
