= Evan Fournier =

French basketball player (born 1992)

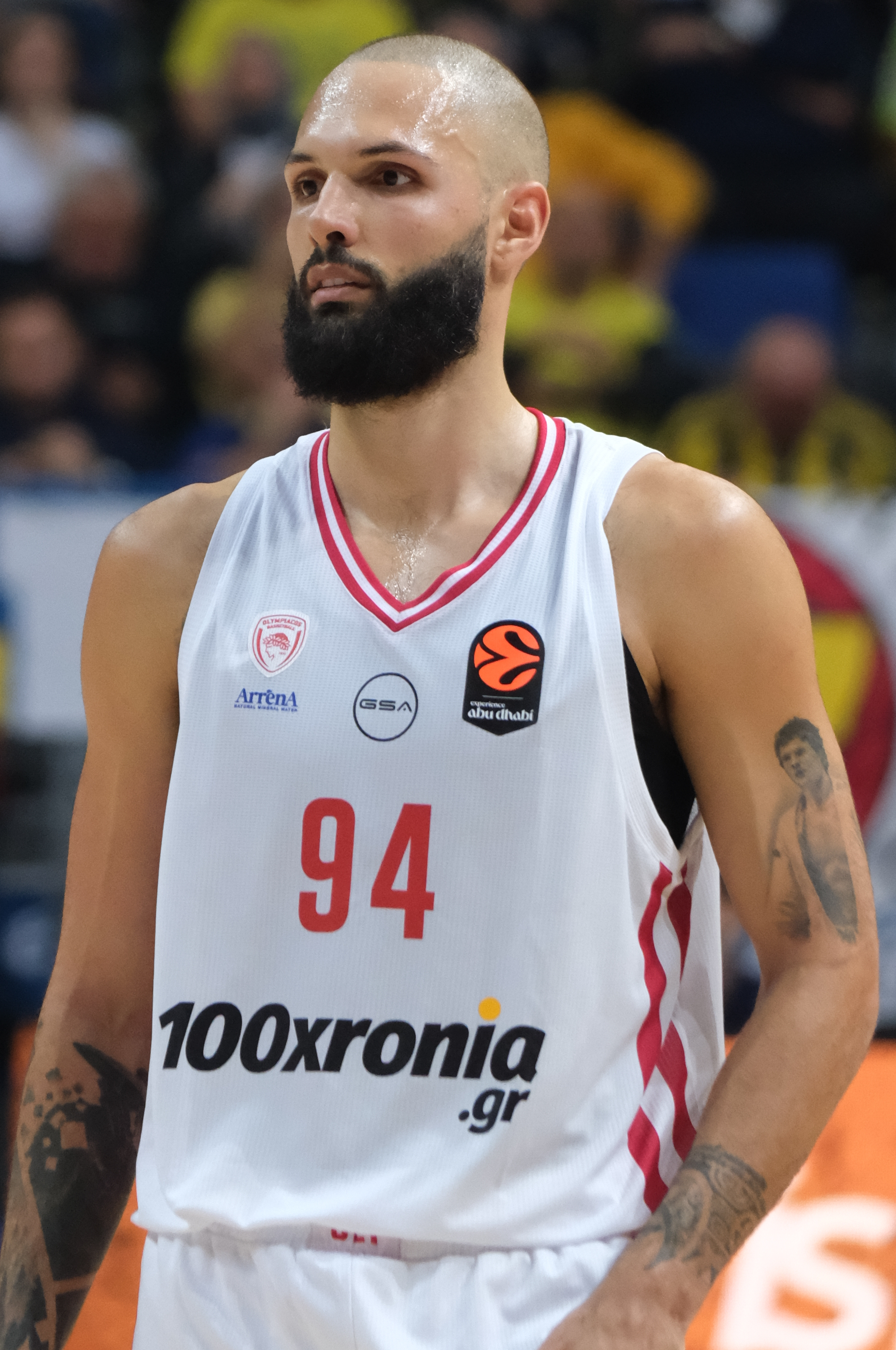
- Fournier with Olympiacos in 2026

No. 94 – Olympiacos
- Position: Shooting guard / small forward
- League: GBL; EuroLeague

Personal information
- Born: 29 October 1992 (age 34) Saint-Maurice, France
- Listed height: 2.01 m (6 ft 7 in)
- Listed weight: 93 kg (205 lb)

Career information
- High school: INSEP (Paris, France)
- NBA draft: 2012: 1st round, 20th overall pick
- Drafted by: Denver Nuggets
- Playing career: 2009–present

Career history
- 2009–2010: Nanterre 92
- 2010–2012: Poitiers
- 2012–2014: Denver Nuggets
- 2014–2021: Orlando Magic
- 2021: Boston Celtics
- 2021–2024: New York Knicks
- 2024: Detroit Pistons
- 2024–present: Olympiacos

Career highlights
- EuroLeague champion (2026); EuroLeague Final Four MVP (2026); All-EuroLeague Second Team (2025); 2× Greek League champion (2025, 2026); 3× Greek Super Cup winner (2024–2026); Greek League MVP (2026); Greek League Finals MVP (2026); 2× All-Greek League Team (2025, 2026); 2× LNB Pro A Best Young Player (2011, 2012); 2× LNB Pro A Most Improved Player (2011, 2012); LNB All-Star (2012)
- Stats at NBA.com
- Stats at Basketball Reference
Medals
Men's basketball
Representing France
Summer Olympics
Silver medal – second place	2020 Tokyo	Team
Silver medal – second place	2024 Paris	Team
World Cup
Bronze medal – third place	2014 Spain
Bronze medal – third place	2019 China
EuroBasket
Silver medal – second place	2022 Czech Republic–Georgia–Italy–Germany
Bronze medal – third place	2015 France–Croatia–Germany–Latvia
FIBA U20 EuroBasket
Bronze medal – third place	2011 Spain	U-20 Team
FIBA U18 EuroBasket
Silver medal – second place	2009 France	U-18 Team

Evan Mehdi Fournier (French pronunciation: [fuʁnie]; born 29 October 1992) is a French professional basketball player for Olympiacos of the Greek Basketball League (GBL) and the EuroLeague. After a twelve-year stint in the NBA he returned to Europe, where he was named to the All-EuroLeague Second Team in his debut season.

Fournier led Olympiacos to the 2025 EuroLeague Final Four and the EuroLeague title in 2026, earning the EuroLeague Final Four MVP award in the process. He has been a regular member of the French national team, winning multiple medals on the EuroBasket, FIBA World Cup, and Olympic levels.

== Early life ==
Fournier was born on 29 October 1992, in Saint-Maurice, a small suburb outside of Paris, to a French father and a mother of Algerian descent. He became interested in basketball in 2002, thanks to the 2001–02 Sacramento Kings team. Fournier wore the number 10 on his jersey in honor of then-Sacramento King, Mike Bibby. He played junior basketball at the French INSEP academy from 2007 to 2009.

== Professional career ==
=== JSF Nanterre (2009–2010) ===
In September 2009, Fournier signed a one-year deal with JSF Nanterre of the LNB Pro B.

=== Poitiers Basket 86 (2010–2012) ===
In June 2010, Fournier signed a two-year deal Poitiers Basket 86 of the LNB Pro A.

=== Denver Nuggets (2012–2014) ===
On 28 June 2012, Fournier was selected with the 20th overall pick by the Denver Nuggets in the 2012 NBA draft. On 11 July 2012, he signed his rookie scale contract with the Nuggets. He then joined the Nuggets for the 2012 NBA Summer League. Over the Nuggets' first 73 games of the 2012–13 season, Fournier appeared in just 29 of them while registering 10 points or more just once. He appeared in nine straight games to finish the regular season and started the final three. During this late-season stretch, he averaged 12.3 points and scored 17 points or more four games, including a season-best 24 points on 14 April 2013.

In July 2013, Fournier re-joined the Nuggets for the 2013 NBA Summer League. On 30 October 2013, the Nuggets exercised their third-year team option on Fournier's rookie scale contract, extending the contract through the 2014–15 season. On 23 February 2014, Fournier scored a then career-high 27 points against the Sacramento Kings.

=== Orlando Magic (2014–2021) ===
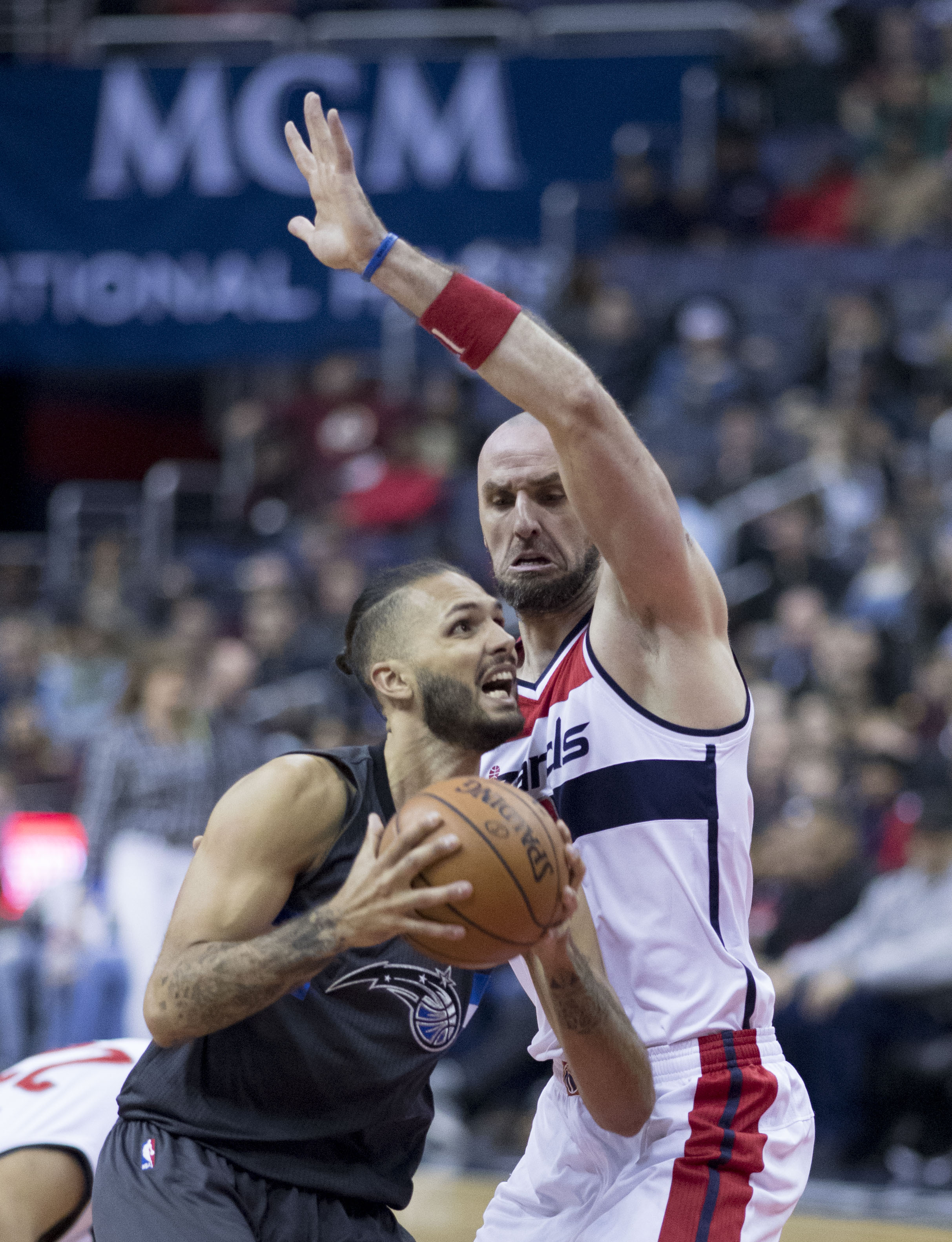
Fournier going up against Marcin Gortat in 2017

On 26 June 2014, Fournier was traded, along with the draft rights to Devyn Marble, to the Orlando Magic in exchange for Arron Afflalo. On 26 October 2013, the Magic exercised their fourth-year team option on Fournier's rookie scale contract, extending the contract through the 2015–16 season. On 12 November 2014, Fournier scored a then career-high 28 points on 8-of-14 shooting in a 97–95 win over the New York Knicks.

On 3 November 2015, Fournier set a new career high with 30 points in a 103–94 win over the New Orleans Pelicans. On 15 March 2016, Fournier matched his career high with a 30-point effort against the Denver Nuggets. In 2015–16, Fournier had a career year in which he averaged personal highs in scoring (15.4 ppg), rebounding (2.8 rpg), assists (2.7 apg), steals (1.2 spg) and minutes (32.5 mpg). He led the team in scoring 19 times, had 24 20-point games and two 30-point games.

On 7 July 2016, Fournier re-signed with the Magic on a five-year, $85 million contract. On 3 November 2016, he scored a season-high 29 points against the Sacramento Kings.

On 16 January 2018, Fournier scored a career-high 32 points in a 108–102 win over the Minnesota Timberwolves. On 7 March 2018, against the Los Angeles Lakers, Fournier sprained his left medial collateral ligament. He was subsequently ruled out for "a significant stretch of time".

On 1 December 2019, Fournier tied his career-high of 32 points in a game in a 100–96 win over Golden State.

=== Boston Celtics (2021) ===
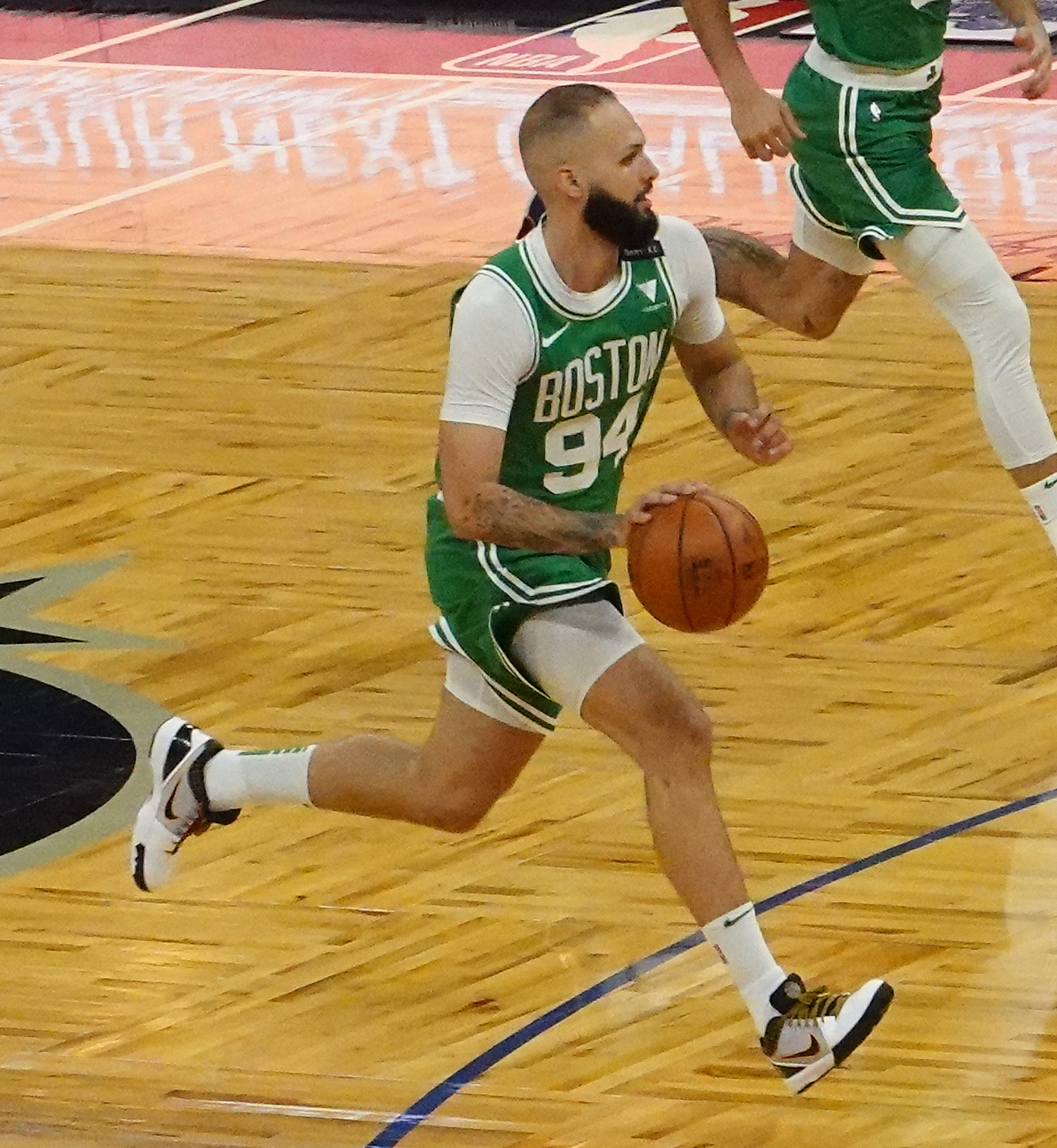
Fournier driving towards the basket in a May 2021 game

On 25 March 2021, Fournier was traded to the Boston Celtics in exchange for Jeff Teague and two future second round draft picks. Fournier had played and started in 26 games and was averaging 19.7 points, 2.9 rebounds, 3.7 assists and 1.0 steals, while shooting 38.8 percent from three-point range with the Magic for the season. On 29 March, Fournier debuted for the Celtics against the New Orleans Pelicans but went scoreless in 33 minutes of action. On 2 April, Fournier scored 23 points and logged a career-high seven 3-pointers in a 118–102 win over the Houston Rockets. Fournier put up 20 points of his 23 point-performance in the fourth quarter, becoming the second Celtics player to score 20 points on 100 percent shooting in a quarter since Paul Pierce. He missed several games due to the NBA's COVID-19 health and safety protocols.

On March 25th, 2021 Fournier tagged the Boston Celtics on Twitter asking Celtics fans to google his name. Fournier’s name when searched gives results of Fournier’s Gangrene, a form of Gangrene involving the external genitalia. Images of Fournier’s Gangrene are described as explicit, giving Fournier the nickname of “Don’t Google” as Fournier’s last name gives results of Fournier’s Gangrene.

=== New York Knicks (2021–2024) ===
On 17 August 2021, the New York Knicks acquired Fournier in a sign-and-trade deal with the Celtics. On 20 October, Fournier made his Knicks debut, tying a career-high 32 points in a 138–134 double overtime win over his former team, the Boston Celtics. On 6 January 2022, Fournier surpassed that career-high, scoring 41 points behind ten three-pointers, along with eight rebounds, in a 108–105 victory over the Celtics. On 23 March, in a 121–106 win over the Charlotte Hornets, he broke the Knicks' record of most 3-pointers made in a season, surpassing John Starks' record set in 1995 (217).

=== Detroit Pistons (2024) ===
On 8 February 2024, Fournier, Ryan Arcidiacono, Malachi Flynn, Quentin Grimes and two second-round picks were traded to the Detroit Pistons in exchange for Bojan Bogdanović and Alec Burks.

=== Olympiacos (2024–present) ===
On 2 September 2024, Fournier signed with Greek club Olympiacos of the Greek Basket League and the EuroLeague for three years. In his debut season, Fournier was named to the All-EuroLeague Team, after averaging 15.8 points in the league with the Reds. He led Olympiacos to the Final Four in Abu Dhabi. There, Fournier scored a game-high 31 points in the semifinal against Monaco, but was unable to avoid the defeat. Fournier won the Greek championship with Olympiacos in 2025.

On 26 July 2025, Fournier signed a contract extension through 2028 with an increased salary.

On 26 March 2026, Fournier received a one-game suspension and a fine by the Greek Basketball League following his ejection in the 15 March game after a verbal altercation with a courtside fan.

== Club career statistics ==
Legend
GP	Games played	GS	Games started	MPG	Minutes per game
FG%	Field goal percentage	3P%	3-point field goal percentage	FT%	Free throw percentage
RPG	Rebounds per game	APG	Assists per game	SPG	Steals per game
BPG	Blocks per game	PPG	Points per game	**Bold**	Career high

=== Regular season ===
Year	Team	GP	GS	MPG	FG%	3P%	FT%	RPG	APG	SPG	BPG	PPG
2012–13	Denver	38	4	11.3	**.493**	.407	.769	.9	1.2	.5	.0	5.3
2013–14	Denver	76	4	19.8	.419	.376	.756	2.7	1.5	.4	.1	8.4
2014–15	Orlando	58	32	28.6	.440	.378	.728	2.6	2.1	.7	.0	12.0
2015–16	Orlando	79	71	32.5	.462	.400	.836	2.8	2.7	1.2	.0	15.4
2016–17	Orlando	68	66	**32.8**	.439	.356	.805	3.1	3.0	1.0	.1	17.2
2017–18	Orlando	57	57	32.2	.459	.379	.867	3.2	2.9	.8	.3	17.8
2018–19	Orlando	**81**	**81**	31.5	.438	.340	.806	3.2	3.6	.9	.1	15.1
2019–20	Orlando	66	66	31.4	.467	.399	.818	2.6	3.2	1.1	.2	18.5
2020–21	Orlando	26	26	30.3	.461	.388	.797	2.9	**3.7**	1.0	.3	**19.7**
2020–21	Boston	16	10	29.5	.448	**.463**	.714	**3.3**	3.1	**1.3**	**.6**	13.0
2021–22	New York	80	80	29.5	.417	.389	.708	2.6	2.1	1.0	.3	14.1
2022–23	New York	27	7	17.0	.337	.307	.857	1.8	1.3	.6	.1	6.1
2023–24	New York	3	0	12.9	.200	.133	**1.000**	1.3	1.0	**1.3**	.0	4.0
2023–24	Detroit	29	0	18.7	.373	.270	.794	1.9	1.6	.9	.2	7.2
Career		704	504	27.7	.441	.374	.799	2.7	2.5	.9	.2	13.6

=== Playoffs ===
Year	Team	GP	GS	MPG	FG%	3P%	FT%	RPG	APG	SPG	BPG	PPG
2013	Denver	4	4	13.3	.353	.000	**.875**	.0	1.0	.5	.0	4.8
2019	Orlando	**5**	**5**	**35.0**	.348	.235	.750	3.2	2.0	**1.4**	.0	12.4
2020	Orlando	**5**	**5**	34.2	.351	.343	.706	**4.0**	**2.6**	1.2	**.6**	12.8
2021	Boston	**5**	**5**	33.4	**.429**	**.433**	.833	3.6	1.4	1.2	.0	**15.4**
Career		19	19	29.8	.374	.308	.778	2.8	1.8	1.1	.2	11.7

=== EuroLeague stats ===
†	Denotes season in which Fournier won the EuroLeague

Year	Team	GP	GS	MPG	FG%	3P%	FT%	RPG	APG	SPG	BPG	PPG	PIR
2024–25	Olympiacos	37	**36**	**25.4**	**.426**	.358	.735	**2.2**	2.6	**1.1**	**.1**	**16.1**	**12.6**
2025–26†	Olympiacos	**39**	9	21.9	.405	**.369**	**.808**	2.1	**2.9**	.8	**.1**	11.6	9.0
Career		37	36	23.8	.417	.363	.769	2.1	2.8	.9	.1	13.8	10.8

=== Domestic leagues stats ===
†	Denotes season in which Fournier won the Domestic league

Year	Team	League	GP	MPG	FG%	3P%	FT%	RPG	APG	SPG	BPG	PPG
2010–11	(France) Poitiers	Pro A	29	14.4	.446	.217	.841	2.0	.7	.7	.1	6.4
2011–12	(France) Poitiers	Pro A	30	26.0	.425	.277	.754	3.2	2.2	1.5	.1	14.0
2024–25†	(Greece) Olympiacos	GBL	20	23.0	.389	.326	.684	1.2	2.3	.5	.0	9.4
2025–26†	(Greece) Olympiacos	GBL	22	23.3	.485	.408	.827	2.5	3.5	.7	.0	12.7

== France national team career statistics ==
**	Denotes tournaments in which Fournier won a Silver medal (second place)
***	Denotes tournaments in which Fournier won a Bronze medal (third place)

Year	Tournament	National Team	GP	GS	MPG	FG%	3P%	FT%	RPG	APG	SPG	BPG	PPG
2014	World Cup	France men	9	0	14.8	.385	.241	.682	1.3	1.2	.2	–	6.9
2015	EuroBasket	France men	9	2	15.3	.447	.500	.875	1.8	1.4	.7	.1	6.8
2017	EuroBasket	France men	6	6	23.5	.477	.370	.821	2.3	1.7	1.7	–	15.8
2018	World OQT	France men	2	2	25.0	.500	.222	1.000	1.5	3.5	1.0	–	12.5
2019	World Cup	France men	8	8	27.8	.420	.410	.722	3.0	3.8	.9	.1	19.8
2020	Summer Olympics	France men	6	6	28.3	.455	.378	.833	3.2	2.5	.3	–	18.7
2022	World OQT	France men	2	2	25.0	.313	.316	.556	3.0	2.5	3.0	–	15.5
2022	EuroBasket	France men	9	9	29.4	.403	.338	.769	2.9	3.0	3.0	–	15.3
2023	World Cup	France men	5	5	22.8	.429	.324	.769	3.0	1.4	.8	.2	13.8
2024	Summer Olympics	France men	6	6	20.7	.340	.324	1.000	1.7	2.2	.5	.2	9.8

== Awards and honors ==
=== Titles won ===
- EuroLeague Champion 2026 (with Olympiacos Piraeus)
- 2× Greek League Champion: 2025, 2026 (with Olympiacos Piraeus)
- 3× Greek Super Cup Winner: 2024, 2025, 2026 (with Olympiacos Piraeus)

=== France national team ===
- 2024 Summer Olympics: Silver
- 2022 FIBA EuroBasket: Silver
- 2020 Summer Olympics: Silver
- 2019 FIBA World Cup: Bronze
- 2015 FIBA EuroBasket: Bronze
- 2014 FIBA World Cup: Bronze

=== France youth national team ===
- 2011 FIBA U20 EuroBasket: Bronze
- 2009 FIBA U18 EuroBasket: Silver
- Participated in the 2011 Nike Hoop Summit

=== Individual ===
==== Pro clubs ====
- EuroLeague Final Four MVP: 2026
- All-EuroLeague Second Team: 2025
- Greek League MVP: 2026
- Greek League Finals MVP: 2026
- 2× All-Greek League Team: 2025, 2026
- 2× LNB Pro A Best Young Player: 2010–11, 2011–12
- 2× LNB Pro A Most Improved Player: 2010–11, 2011–12

==== France national team tournaments awards ====
- All-FIBA World Cup Team: 2019

==== France youth national team tournaments awards ====
- All-FIBA U20 EuroBasket Team: 2011
- All-FIBA U18 EuroBasket Team: 2009

== Personal life ==
Fournier and his wife Laura have a son. In 2020, the couple bought a $2.9 million estate in Winter Park, Florida.
