= INSEP =

Sports training center in Paris, France

INSEP Institut national du sport, de l'expertise et de la performance (National Institute of Sport, Expertise, and Performance)
- Location: Paris, France; 48°49′53″N 2°27′13″E
- Campus: Bois de Vincennes (Paris)
- Website: www.insep.fr/fr

INSEP, the National Institute of Sport, Expertise, and Performance (Institut national du sport, de l'expertise et de la performance), is a French sport boarding school, training institute and center that trains elite athletes. It is located on the outskirts of Paris, in the Bois de Vincennes.

== History, activities, and structure ==
INSEP was formed in 1975 from the merger of INS (the National Institute of Sport) and ENSEP (L'École Normale Supérieure d'Éducation Physique), and has roots in the 1817 Amoros Military Gymnasium. It trains athletes in 26 different sports.

It operates under the French Ministry of Youth and Sport, and functions based on centralized athletic partnerships with prominent high schools in Paris — such as Lycée Condorcet, Lycée Saint-Louis, Lycée Janson de Sailly, GHS Claude Monet, and The International School of Paris — with a measure of autonomy.

As a boarding school, it provides bedrooms divided into 2 buildings: from 15 years old to 17 years old and over 18 years old. Athletes have school on site up to the baccalaureate as well as some higher education courses.

== Notable alumni ==
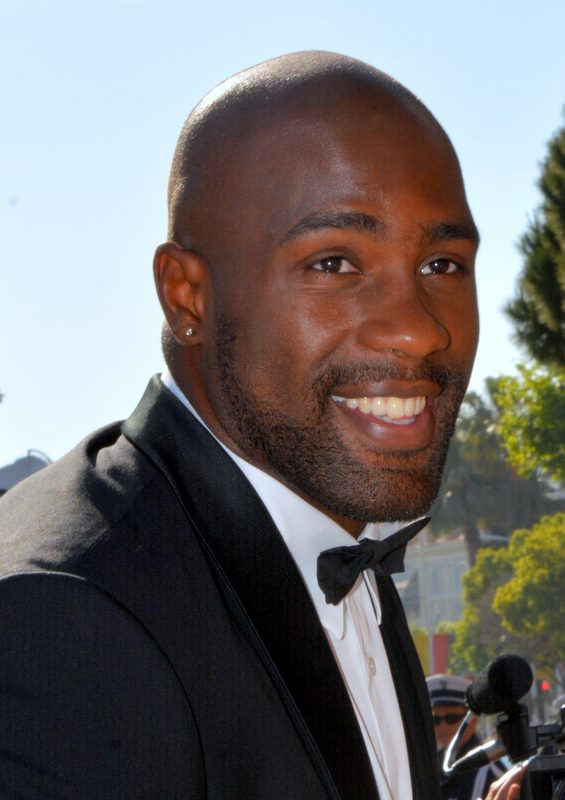
Teddy Riner

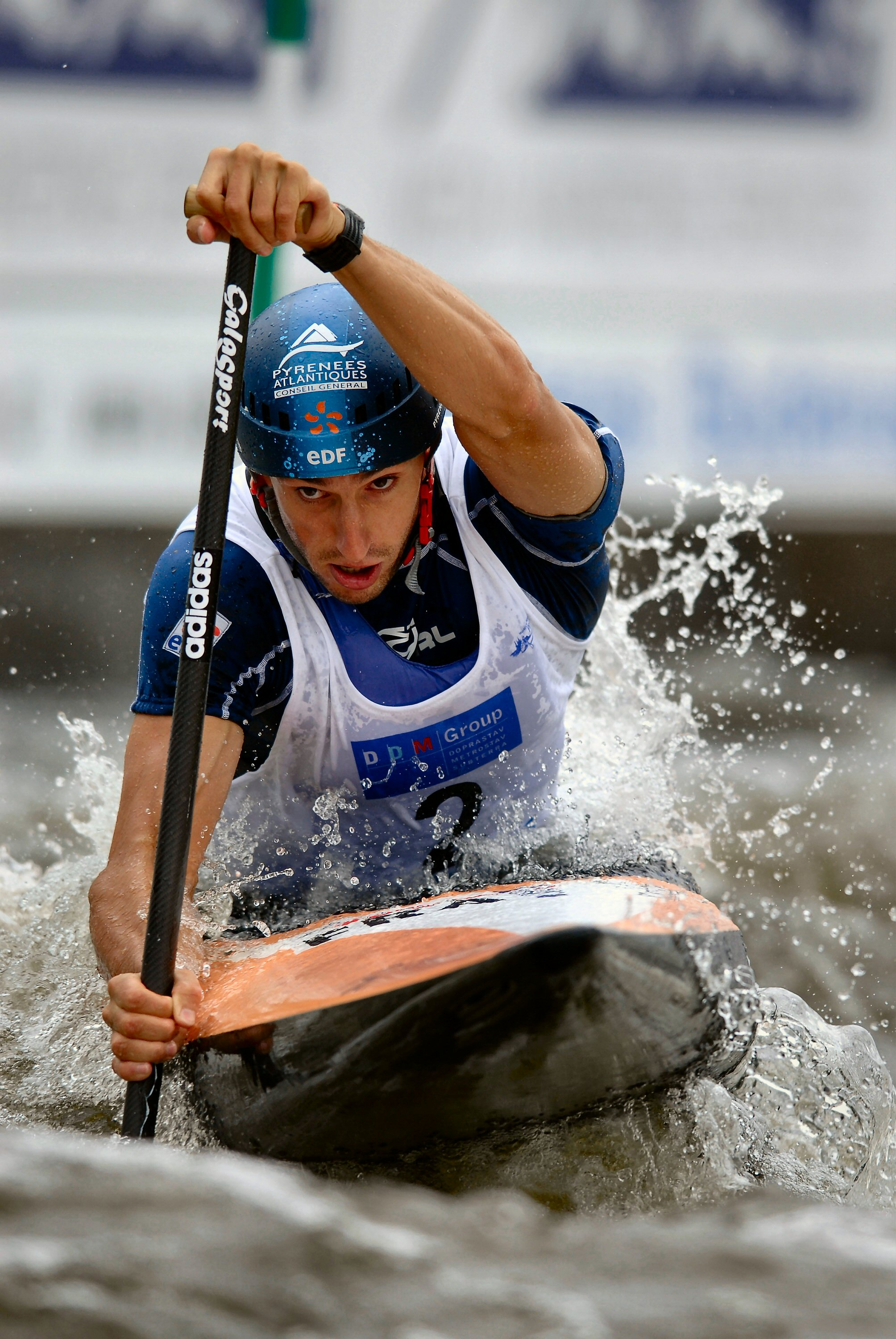
Tony Estanguet

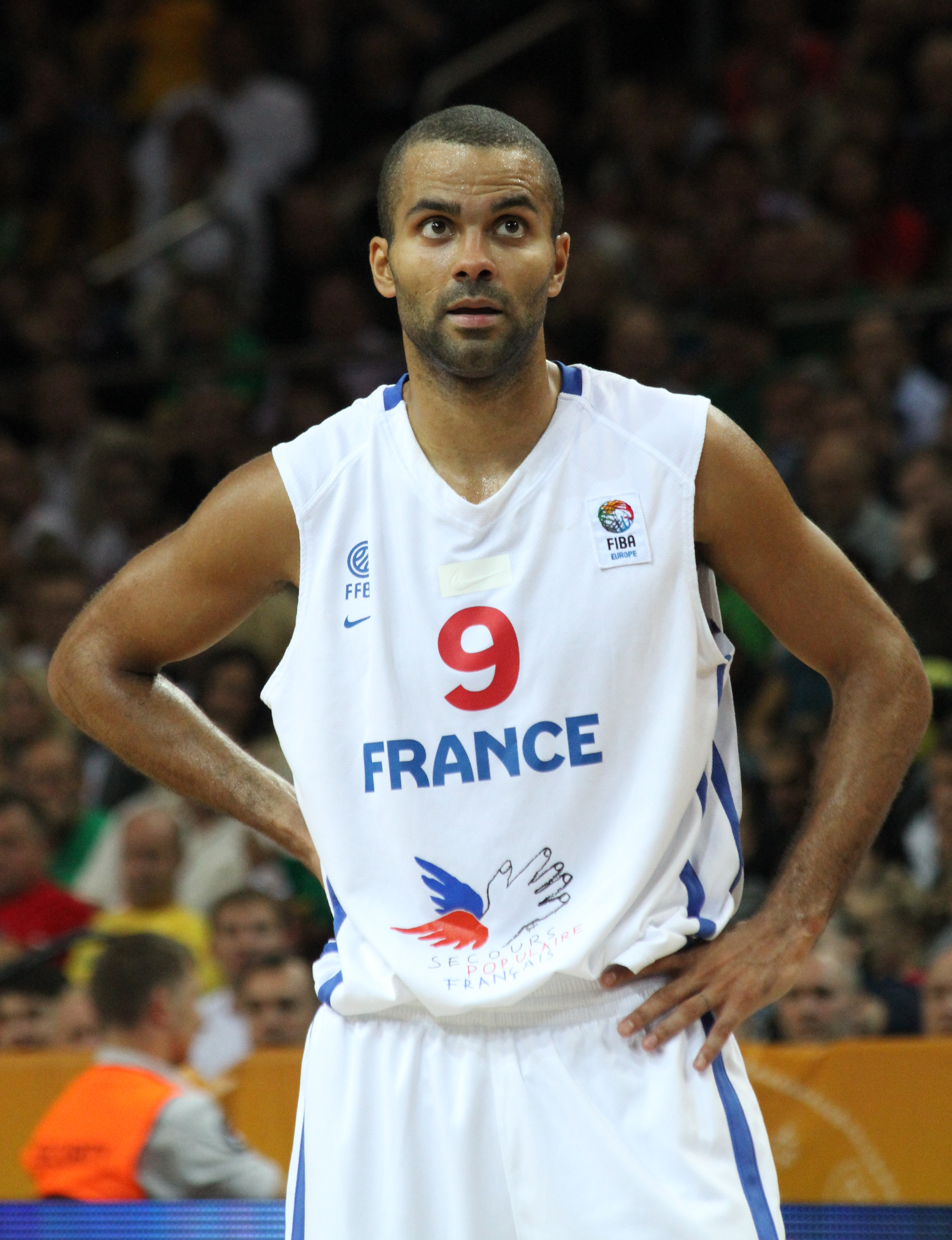
Tony Parker

- Nicolas Beaudan, Fencing
- Yannick Borel, Fencing
- Frédéric Bourdillon, Basketball
- Marine Boyer, Artistic gymnastics
- Manon Brunet, Fencing
- Clint Capela, Basketball
- Boris Dallo, Basketball
- Stéphane Diagana, Track & field
- Boris Diaw, Basketball
- Tony Estanguet, Whitewater slalom
- Evan Fournier, Basketball
- Romain Gazave (born 1976), Ice skating
- Anne-Caroline Graffe, Taekwondo
- Sandrine Gruda, Basketball
- Ronan Gustin, Fencing
- Damien Inglis, Basketball
- Daniel Jérent, Fencing
- Joffrey Lauvergne, Basketball
- Émilie Le Pennec, Artistic gymnastics
- Lila Meesseman-Bakir, Synchronized swimming
- Mahiedine Mekhissi-Benabbad, Middle distance running
- Tony Parker, Basketball
- Marie-José Pérec, Track & field
- Johan Petro, Basketball
- Yves Pons, Basketball
- Claire Pontlevoy, Artistic gymnastics
- Lucas Pouille, Tennis
- Cyrian Ravet, Taekwondo
- Teddy Riner, Judo
- Michel Sebastiani, Modern pentathlon and fencing
- Ronny Turiaf, Basketball

== Notable faculty ==
- Alphonse Halimi, boxer

== See also ==
- Institut de recherche biomédicale et d'épidémiologie du sport
- Sport in France
- Sports Studies in France
