= Sajono Sumodidjojo =

Dean of the University of Indonesia Faculty of Public Health
- In office 1965–1970
- Preceded by: office established
- Succeeded by: Teuku Karimoeddin

Personal details
- Born: 20 August 1910 Yogyakarta, Dutch East Indies
- Died: 2 December 1973 (aged 63) Jakarta, Indonesia
- Spouse: K.S.A. Sajono
- Children: 3
- Education: Geneeskundige Hoogeschool (dr.); Harvard School of Public Health (MPH); University of Indonesia (Prof.)

Sajono Sumodidjojo (20 August 1910 – 2 December 1973) was an Indonesian physician and public health expert. He served as the chief of the Jakarta municipal health service from 1961 to 1965 and dean of the faculty of public health of the University of Indonesia from 1965 to 1970.

== Early life ==
Sajono Sumodidjojo was born in Yogyakarta on 20 August 1910. After graduating from high school in his birthplace, he continued his education at the Geneeskundige Hoogeschool in Jakarta, receiving his medical degree in 1940. In 1954, sponsored by the World Health Organization, he earned a master of public health from the Harvard School of Public Health.

== Career ==
Following his graduation, he worked as a private physician for the Billiton Tin Company until 1943. He then served the Jakarta municipal government as a physician, focusing on outpatient services at various clinics throughout Jakarta. He also worked as a school health physician from 1950 to 1959. He later served in the Jakarta municipal government health service, where he became the chief of the maternal and child health and school head service. During his tenure, he initiated the establishment of the Putera Bahagia foundation to provide underprivileged primary school children in Jakarta, following a health survey conducted by his service that revealed six out of twenty thousand elementary school students in Jakarta required urgent medical treatment. Around this time, he also became the private physician to Prime Minister Ali Sastroamidjojo. Upon returning to Indonesia, Sajono continued his service in Jakarta, where he led the municipal health services as deputy chief, and later chief. During his four-year tenure as Jakarta's health chief from 1961 to 1965, significant advancements in the city's health were achieved.

Aside from his career in health service, Sajono also worked as a lecturer, teaching at his alma mater and the Trisakti and Atmajaya University. In 1963, he became the head of the public health section at the University of Indonesia's medicine faculty. In 1964, he proposed the establishment of the faculty of public health to rector Soemantri Brodjonegoro, dean Sjahriar Rasad, and the WHO representative in Indonesia. The faculty was established on 26 February 1965, and Sajono became its first dean. He was later appointed as a full professor of public health and preventive medicine on 5 November 1966, with an inaugural speech titled Man, Society, and Health. To improve the faculty's curriculum, he led a delegation of three lecturers to several Latin American countries in 1967, studying public health systems similar to Indonesia's. He served until 1970 and retired from the academia in 1971.

== Personal life ==
Sajono is married to K.S.A. Sajono, daughter of Seno Sastroamidjojo, who worked as an advisor to the Dutch-owned Billiton Tin Company, and has three children. He died on 2 December 1973.
