= Institut de recherche biomédicale et d'épidémiologie du sport =

French public biomedical agency

- Established: November 2006
- Location: INSEP (Paris), Paris, France
- Website: IRMES:

Institut de recherche biomédicale et d'épidémiologie du sport (IRMES) is a French public agency dedicated to biomedical and epidemiological studies of sport under the auspices of INSEP, INSERM, AP-HP, and Paris Descartes University. It is currently headed by Jean-François Toussaint.

The Institute for Biomedical Research and Sports Epidemiology (IRMES) is an institute created in 2006 with the aim of reorganizing sports medicine and epidemiology in France around objective data, allowing a better understanding of the health problems of sports in high level.

== Publications ==
1. The Citius End: World Records Progression Announces the Completion of a Brief Ultra-Physiological Quest

2. From Oxford to Hawaii, Ecophysiological Barriers Limit Human Progression in Ten Sport Monuments

3. Success in Developing Regions: World Records Evolution through a Geopolitical Prism
