= Maison du Sport International =

Building complex in Lausanne

Coordinates: 46.5154°N 6.6093°E

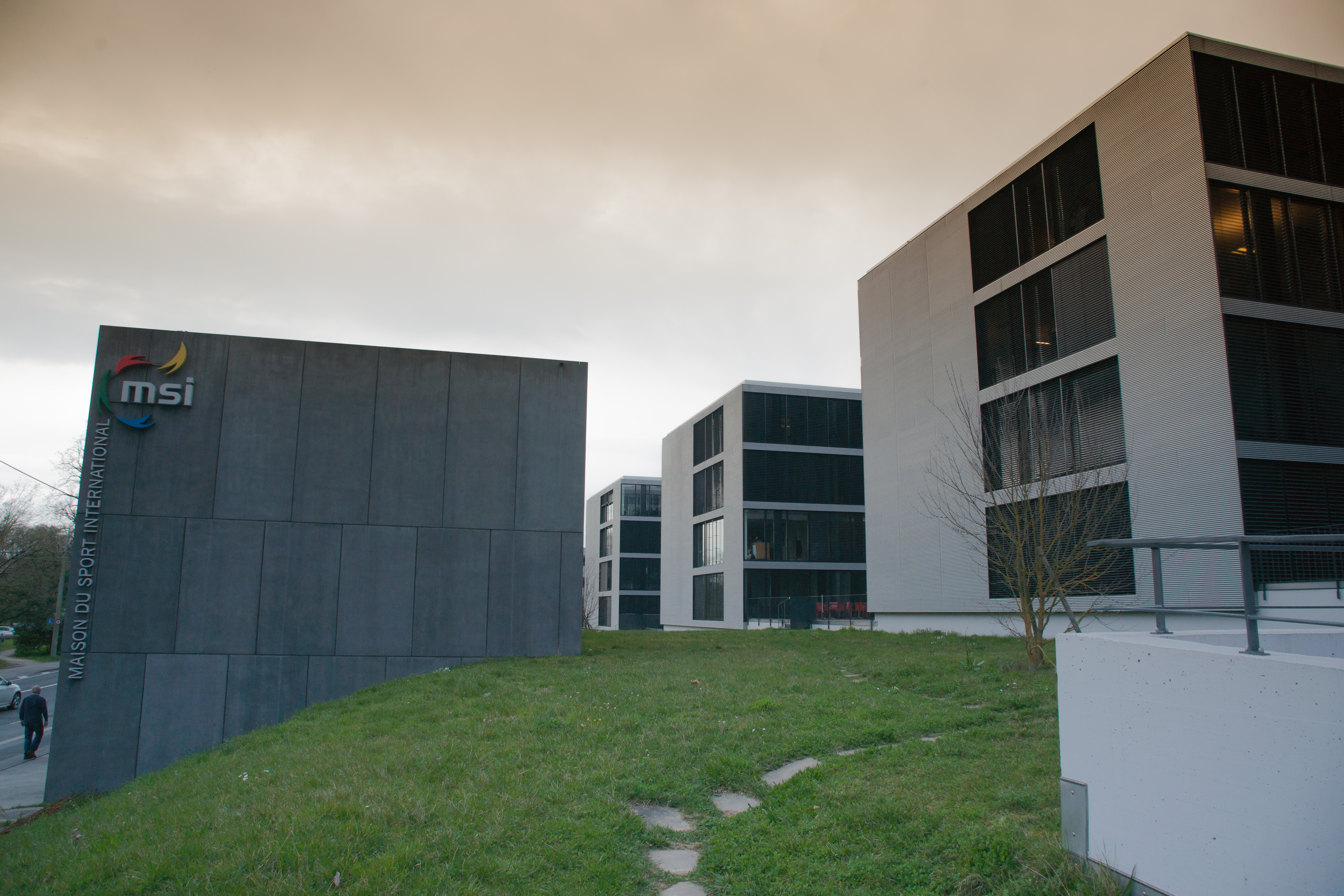
Maison du Sport International

The Maison du Sport International (International House of Sport) is an office complex opened in 2006 in Lausanne, Switzerland, via a joint venture between the City of Lausanne, the Canton of Vaud and the International Olympic Committee (IOC). It was created to entice all the World's sports governing bodies (also known as International Federations or IF's) to bring their headquarters to Lausanne, in order to improve their proximity to the headquarters of the IOC, and thus improve communications between these bodies.

However, many international federations have their offices elsewhere, often in a country where the specific sport traditionally has a regular following. With modern communications, the need for physical presence is also not as important anymore.

== International federations at Maison du Sport International ==
Currently the tenants of the MSI, include these International Federations:

- FAI World Air Sports Federation
- FIAS International Federation of Amateur SAMBO
- FIDE International Chess Federation
- FIE International Fencing Federation
- IBA International Boxing Association
- IBSF International Bobsleigh and Skeleton Federation
- ICF International Canoe Federation
- ICSD International Committee of Sports for the Deaf
- IFMA International Federation of Muaythai Associations
- IFSC International Federation of Sport Climbing
- IGF International Golf Federation
- ITTF International Table Tennis Federation
- IWF International Weightlifting Federation
- TRI World Triathlon
- UMB World Billard Union
- WA World Archery Federation
- WBF World Bridge Federation
- WDSF World DanceSport Federation
- WRF World Rowing Federation
- WT World Taekwondo
- WSK World Skate

== European Confederations at Maison du Sport International ==
Additionally, the tenants of the MSI include these European Confederations:

- CEB Confédération Européenne de Billard
- EBL European Bridge League
- UEC European Cycling Union

== Sports organizations at Maison du Sport International ==
And, these Sports organizations:

- ARPT Association des Piscines Romandes et Tessinoises
- ARISF Association of IOC Recognised International Sports Federations
- ASOIF Association of Summer Olympic International Federations
- FIMS International Federation of Sports Medicine
- Global Observatory For Gender Equality & Sport
- GAISF Global Association of International Sports Federations
- IMGA International Masters Games Association
- WADA World Anti-Doping Agency European Office
- SportAccord (Formerly GAISF/AGFIS)
- ThinkSport

== Sports related firms at Maison du Sport International ==
The MSI also houses these sports-related firms:

- Agence France Presse
- Bornan Sports Technology
- Carlson Wagonlit Travel
- H&A Media
- La Boutique
- Libra Law Ibarrola & Ramoni
- RBO Organisations
- SPORTFIVE
- SportsXpert
- Sports management School Lausanne
- TIMES Attorneys
- The Shift
- VIVA VOCE
