= Poitiers Basket 86 =

- Nickname: PB86
- Leagues: Élite 2
- Founded: 2004; 22 years ago
- History: Poitiers Basket 86 (2004–present)
- Arena: Salle Saint-Éloi (3,500 seats)
- Location: Poitiers, France
- President: Alain Baudier
- Head coach: Andrew Thornton-Jones
- Championships: 1 Pro B champions
- Website: pb86.fr
| Home | Away | Third |

Poitiers Basket 86, also known as PB86 or simply Poitiers, are a French professional basketball team located in the city of Poitiers, in the Nouvelle-Aquitaine region. The team competes in the Élite 2 league, the second tier of professional basketball in France. The home games are played at Salle de Saint-Éloi, and the home colors and uniforms are white and blue.

== History ==
Poitiers Basket 86 was founded in 2004, following the merging of two teams - CEP Poitiers and Stade Poitevin. The club began its first season in Nationale 3 with Grégory Thiélin as head coach and ranked at a promising 5th place at the end of the season. The following year, the team was promoted to the LNB Pro B, making it the first team ever from Poitiers to play at a professional level. The 2006/2007 season was difficult for the team which finished 13th.

During the 2007/2008 season, Ruddy Nelhomme was named head coach. He kept the following French players (Costentin, Devéhat, Gomez, Guillard, Maynier) and recruited two Americans from Brest (Younger and Gunn), the experimented Thomas Darnauzan and some young players from the under-20 team (Kanté, Florimont, Dienepo, Dalmat).

In salle Lawson Body, Poitiers began its second season with the ambition of doing well in its second professional season. At the end of the regular season, the team finished third and gained access to the playoffs but eventually lost in the final against Besançon.

In the 2008/2009 season, Poitiers qualified for the playoffs once again, by finishing second during the regular season. The team won the Final against Limoges and was promoted to Pro A.

The team's first year in LNB Pro A was a success. It won its first match away against Nancy. At the end of the regular season, Poitiers beat ASVEL and became the last team to enter the playoffs. For the first time ever, the defending champion didn't qualify for the playoffs. Unfortunately, the club was eliminated during the quarterfinals by Cholet, the season's champion. At the end of the match, Sylvain Maynier announced the end of his career. During the 2010/2011 season, Poitiers eventually stayed in Pro A following a victory against Hyères-Toulon in the last match of the season. The team finished at the 14th place with 12 wins and 18 defeats.

For the 2011/2012 season, JJ Miller joined the team.

The old Poitiers logo, used until 2018

Ruddy Nelhomme was elected best coach of Pro B during the 2008/2009 season and best coach of Pro A the following year. He was then named Assistant Coach for the French basketball team during the World Championship in Turkey and for the EuroBasket 2011, where France reached the final.

Poitiers Basket is known for its innovative communication, becoming the first sport club to create a TV show (Vis mon Match), broadcast on the website of the team. Several thousands of people watched the show which was then shown in a movie theater for two days. Poitiers fans have been elected the most fair-play of Pro A three times in a row.

== Season by season ==
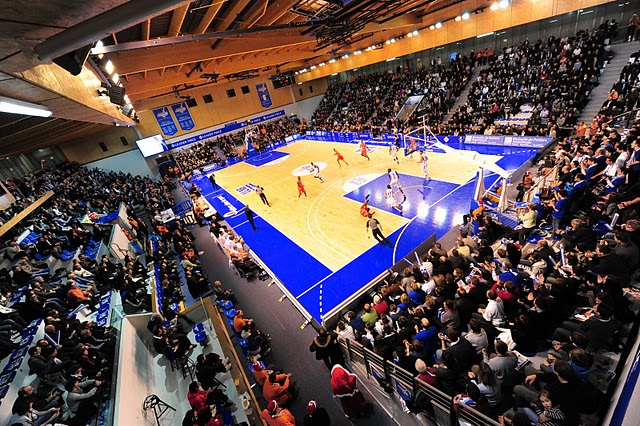
The Salle Saint-Éloi, home arena of Poitiers

| Season | Tier | League | Pos. | French Cup | Other competitions |
|---|---|---|---|---|---|
| 2009–10 | 1 | Pro A | 8th | | |
| 2010–11 | 1 | Pro A | 14th | | |
| 2011–12 | 1 | Pro A | 13th | | |
| 2012–13 | 1 | Pro A | 16th | | |
| 2013–14 | 2 | Pro B | 3rd | | |
| 2014–15 | 2 | Pro B | 12th | | |
| 2015–16 | 2 | Pro B | 8th | | |
| 2016–17 | 2 | Pro B | 10th | | |
| 2017–18 | 2 | Pro B | 16th | | |
| 2017–18 | 2 | Pro B | 9th | | |

== Arenas ==
The club plays its domestic matches at Salle Saint-Eloi (2,700 seats). However, some matches are held at Les Arênes and allows for a larger audience (4,800 seats).

== Roster ==
Note: Flags indicate national team eligibility at FIBA-sanctioned events. Players may hold other non-FIBA nationalities not displayed.

Poitiers Basket 86 roster
Players
Coaches

| Pos. | No. | Nat. | Name |
|---|---|---|---|
| PG | 4 | (France) | Arnaud Thinon |
| G | 5 | (United States) | Ricky Tarrant |
| SG | 7 | (France) | Pierre Cellerier |
| PG | 7 | (France) | Yanik Blanc |
| G | 8 | (United States) | Anthony Goods |
| PG | 10 | (United States) (United Kingdom) | Akeem Williams |
| PF | 11 | (France) | Pierre-Yves Guillard |
| C | 14 | (France) | Sade Hussein |
| SG | 20 | (France) | Kevin Harley |
| SG | | (France) | Bathiste Tchouaffé |

Head coach

(France) Ruddy Nelhomme

Assistant coach(es)

(France) Andy Thornton-Jones

(France) Antoine Brault

Legend

- (C) Team captain
- Injured

- Roster
Updated: 6 January 2021

== Head coaches ==
| Name | Nat. | Tenure |
|---|---|---|
| Grégory Thiélin | (France) | 2004–2007 |
| Ruddy Nelhomme | (France) | 2007–2019 |
| Andrew Thornton-Jones | (France) | 2020–present |

== Notable players ==
Note: Flags indicate national team eligibility at FIBA-sanctioned events. Players may hold other non-FIBA nationalities not displayed.

Criteria

To appear in this section a player must have either:

- Set a club record or won an individual award while at the club
- Played at least one official international match for their national team at any time
- Played at least one official NBA match at any time.

- (France) Pape Badiane
- (France) Moustapha Fall
- (France) Evan Fournier
- (France) / (Guinea) Sekou Doumbouya
- (Sweden) Kenny Grant
- (United States) Anthony Dobbins
- (United States) Ahmad Nivins

== Honours ==
- LNB Pro B
  - Winners (1): 2008–09
- Nationale Masculine 1
  - Winners (1): 2005–06
