= International Federation of Sports Medicine =

International Federation of Sports Medicine (Fédération Internationale de Médecine du Sport)
- Abbreviation: FIMS
- Formation: 1928
- Headquarters: Maison du Sport International
- Location: Lausanne, Switzerland
- Region served: World
- Members: National Sports Medicine Associations
- President: Fabio Pigozzi, Italy
- Affiliations: IOC, Sport Accord, WHO
- Website: www.fims.org

International Federation of Sports Medicine (French: Fédération Internationale de Médecine du Sport or FIMS) is an international organization comprising national sports medicine associations that span all five continents.

== Purpose ==
The aim of FIMS is to assist athletes in achieving optimal performance by maximizing their genetic potential, health, nutrition, and high-quality medical care and training.

== Formation and organization ==
The international sports federations were also founded at the time that the Olympic Games were re-established. The existing sports professionals of the time were being influenced by the organization of the sports and the realization of the importance of promoting the ideas of sports medicine, and at the Winter Olympics held in St Moritz, Switzerland in February 1928, the Association International Medico-Sportive (AIMS) was founded. The main purpose of this Association was to cooperate with the international sports federations and the International Olympic Committee to provide the best medical care for the athletes competing in the Summer and Winter Olympics.

The 1st AIMS International Congress of Sports Medicine was held during the IXth Summer Olympic Games held in Amsterdam, The Netherlands, in August 1928. At least 280 sports physicians from 20 countries attended the meeting, and they had the opportunity to study many of the athletes taking part in the Games through the collection of anthropometric, cardiovascular, physiological and metabolic data.

After several renamings (in 1933: Fédération International Médico-Sportive et Scientifique; in 1934: Fédération International de Médecine Sportive) the name is since 1998: Fédération Internationale de Médecine du Sport (FIMS). As FIMS was born under the umbrella of the Olympic Games, this strong association with the International Olympic Committee (IOC) is reflected in the five Olympic rings in the FIMS flag and logo. FIMS continues to grow as an international community of sports medicine specialists, researching and practicing the latest techniques in medicine for athletes and others who lead active lives.

== Mission ==
FIMS supports national and continental scientific meetings, hosts a biennial FIMS Sports Medicine Congress, hosts regular team physician development courses on all continents, and distributes publications on important sports medicine matters on a regular basis.

== Publications ==
- Sports Medicine Position Statements, prepared by sports medicine and related physicians and organizations
- The World of Sports Medicine - a quarterly newsletter
- International SportMed Journal (ISMJ) - FIMS' electronic journal
- The FIMS Team Physicians Manual

== World Congresses ==
Ist Congress : Amsterdam, Netherlands, 1928
XXXth Barcelona, 2008

== Recognition ==
- Recognized Federation; International Olympic Committee (IOC)
- Affiliate: United Nations Educational, Scientific and Cultural Organization (UNESCO)
