= Eurocup Basketball 2013–14 Last 32 Group I =

Standings and Results for Group I of the Last 32 phase of the 2013–14 Eurocup basketball tournament.

== Standings ==
	Team	Pld	W	L	PF	PA	Diff	Tie-break
1.	(France) JSF Nanterre	6	4	2	489	472	+17	
2.	(Germany) Ratiopharm Ulm	6	3	3	507	503	+4	1–1 (+1)
3.	(Italy) FoxTown Cantù	6	3	3	519	493	+26	1–1 (–1)
4.	(Turkey) Pınar Karşıyaka	6	2	4	438	485	–47	

== Fixtures and results ==
=== Game 1 ===
7 January 2014
20:45 CET

Boxscore

JSF Nanterre (France)	88–84 (OT)	(Italy) FoxTown Cantù
Scoring by quarter: 19–15, 10–16, 24–15, 10–17, Overtime: 8–8, 17–13
Pts: Gladyr 30; Rebs: Jaiteh, Thomas 8 Asts: Meacham 7		Pts: Uter 25; Rebs: Leunen 12; Asts: Aradori 4

Halle Georges Carpentier, Paris
Attendance: 3,000
Referees: Dani Hierrenzuelo (ESP), Petri Mantyla (FIN), Tomasz Trawicki (POL)

8 January 2014
19:30 CET

Boxscore

Ratiopharm Ulm (Germany)	83–64	(Turkey) Pınar Karşıyaka
Scoring by quarter: 20–18, 26–21, 13–11, 24–14
Pts: Sosa 15; Rebs: Plaisted 8 Asts: Günther 6		Pts: Diebler, Dixon 18; Rebs: Batista 13; Asts: Dixon 5

Ratiopharm Arena, Ulm
Attendance: 4,500
Referees: Marek Cmikiewickz (POL), Joseph Bissang (FRA), Igor Dragojevic (MNE)

=== Game 2 ===
15 January 2014
19:00 CET

Boxscore

Pınar Karşıyaka (Turkey)	79–84	(France) JSF Nanterre
Scoring by quarter: 14–16, 10–22, 31–22, 24–24
Pts: Batista 24; Rebs: Batista 9 Asts: Dixon 6		Pts: Meacham 28; Rebs: Gladyr 5, Thomas 5 Asts: Meacham 5

Karşıyaka Arena, İzmir
Attendance: 2,000
Referees: Vicente Bulto (ESP), Sasa Maricic (SRB), Markos Michaelides (SUI)

15 January 2014
20:30 CET

Boxscore

FoxTown Cantù (Italy)	97–106	(Germany) Ratiopharm Ulm
Scoring by quarter: 16-18, 16-36, 38-24, 27-28
Pts: Leunen 17; Rebs: Uter 8 Asts: Ragland 10		Pts: Sosa 24; Rebs: Theis 8 Asts: Sosa 7

Palasport Pianella, Cantù
Attendance: 1,857
Referees: Sinisa Herceg (CRO), Francisco Arana (ESP), Tomislav Hordov (CRO)

=== Game 3 ===
22 January 2014
20:45 CET

Boxscore

JSF Nanterre (France)	95–77	(Germany) Ratiopharm Ulm
Scoring by quarter: 16–18, 32–16, 24–25, 23–18
Pts: Lighty 21; Rebs: Jaiteh 5 Asts: Lighty 6		Pts: Plaisted 23; Rebs: Plaisted 10; Asts: Günther 6

Halle Georges Carpentier, Paris
Attendance: 2,500
Referees: Paolo Taurino (ITA), Tomas Jasevicius (LTU), Benjamin Jimenez (ESP)

22 January 2014
20:30 CET

Boxscore

FoxTown Cantù (Italy)	84–55	(Turkey) Pınar Karşıyaka
Scoring by quarter: 21–21, 31–6, 11–13, 21–15
Pts: Gentile 15; Rebs: Jenkins 9 Asts: Gentile, Ragland 4		Pts: Dixon 13; Rebs: Batista, Hersek 4 Asts: Dixon 4

Palasport Pianella, Cantù
Attendance: 1,764
Referees: Ilija Belosevic (SRB), Sergiy Chebyshev (UKR), Marius Ciulin (ROM)

=== Game 4 ===
28 January 2014
19:30 CET

Boxscore

Ratiopharm Ulm (Germany)	86–72	(France) JSF Nanterre
Scoring by quarter: 27–21, 16–16, 27–13, 16–22
Pts: Schwethelm 21; Rebs: Hess 10; Asts: three players 4		Pts: Lisch 15; Rebs: Daniels 7 Asts: Lighty, Nzeulie 2

Ratiopharm arena, Ulm
Attendance: 5,000
Referees: Jose Martin (EZP), Radomir Vojinovic (MNE), Panagiotis Anastopoulos (GRE)

29 January 2014
19:00 CET

Boxscore

Pınar Karşıyaka (Turkey)	93–80	(Italy) FoxTown Cantù
Scoring by quarter: 36–20, 26–19, 17–18, 14–23
Pts: Batista 30; Rebs: Batista 11; Asts: Koç 5		Pts: Ragland 19; Rebs: Leunen 5 Asts: Ragland 5

Karşıyaka Arena, İzmir
Attendance: 2,000
Referees: Miguel Perez Perez (ESP), Gentian Cici (ALB), Uros Obrknezevic (SRB)

=== Game 5 ===
11 February 2014
20:30 CET

Boxscore

FoxTown Cantù (Italy)	89–74	(France) JSF Nanterre
Scoring by quarter: 14–13, 21–21, 25–24, 29–16
Pts: Jenkins 29; Rebs: Uter 11; Asts: Ragland 7		Pts: Passave-Ducteil 15; Rebs: Passave-Ducteil 7 Asts: Lighty 6

Palasport Pianella, Cantù
Attendance: 1,941
Referees: Recep Ankarali (TUR), Antonio Conde (ESP), Haris Bijedic (BIH)

12 February 2014
19:00 CET

Boxscore

Pınar Karşıyaka (Turkey)	90–78	(Germany) Ratiopharm Ulm
Scoring by quarter: 18-14, 24-19, 22-28, 26-17
Pts: Batista 29; Rebs: Batista 9 Asts: Dixon 11		Pts: Günther 17; Rebs: Theis 7 Asts: Long 3

Karşıyaka Arena, İzmir
Attendance: 5,000
Referees: Dani Hierrezuelo (ESP), Joseph Bissang (FRA), Milos Koljensic (MNE)

=== Game 6 ===
19 February 2014
19:30 CET

Boxsore

Ratiopharm Ulm (Germany)	77–85	(Italy) FoxTown Cantù
Scoring by quarter: 13–25, 20–19, 16–16, 28–25
Pts: Sosa 22; Rebs: Theis 12; Asts: Sosa 5		Pts: Leunen 20; Rebs: Cusin 9 Asts: Ragland 10

Ratiopharm arena, Ulm
Attendance: 5,500
Referees: Andrej Lovsin (SLO), Sinisa Herceg (CRO), Zdravko Rutesic (MNE)

19 February 2014
20:45 CET

Boxscore

JSF Nanterre (France)	76–57	(Turkey) Pınar Karşıyaka
Scoring by quarter: 27–14, 15–18, 18–13, 16–12
Pts: Passave-Ducteil, Thomas 11; Rebs: Jaiteh 6 Asts: Gladyr 3		Pts: Batista 11; Rebs: three players 4 Asts: Şentürk 4

Halle Georges Carpentier, Paris
Attendance: 4,500
Referees: Vicente Bulto (ESP), Petar Obradovic (BIH), Piotr Pastusiak (POL)
