= Pascal Donnadieu =

French basketball player and coach

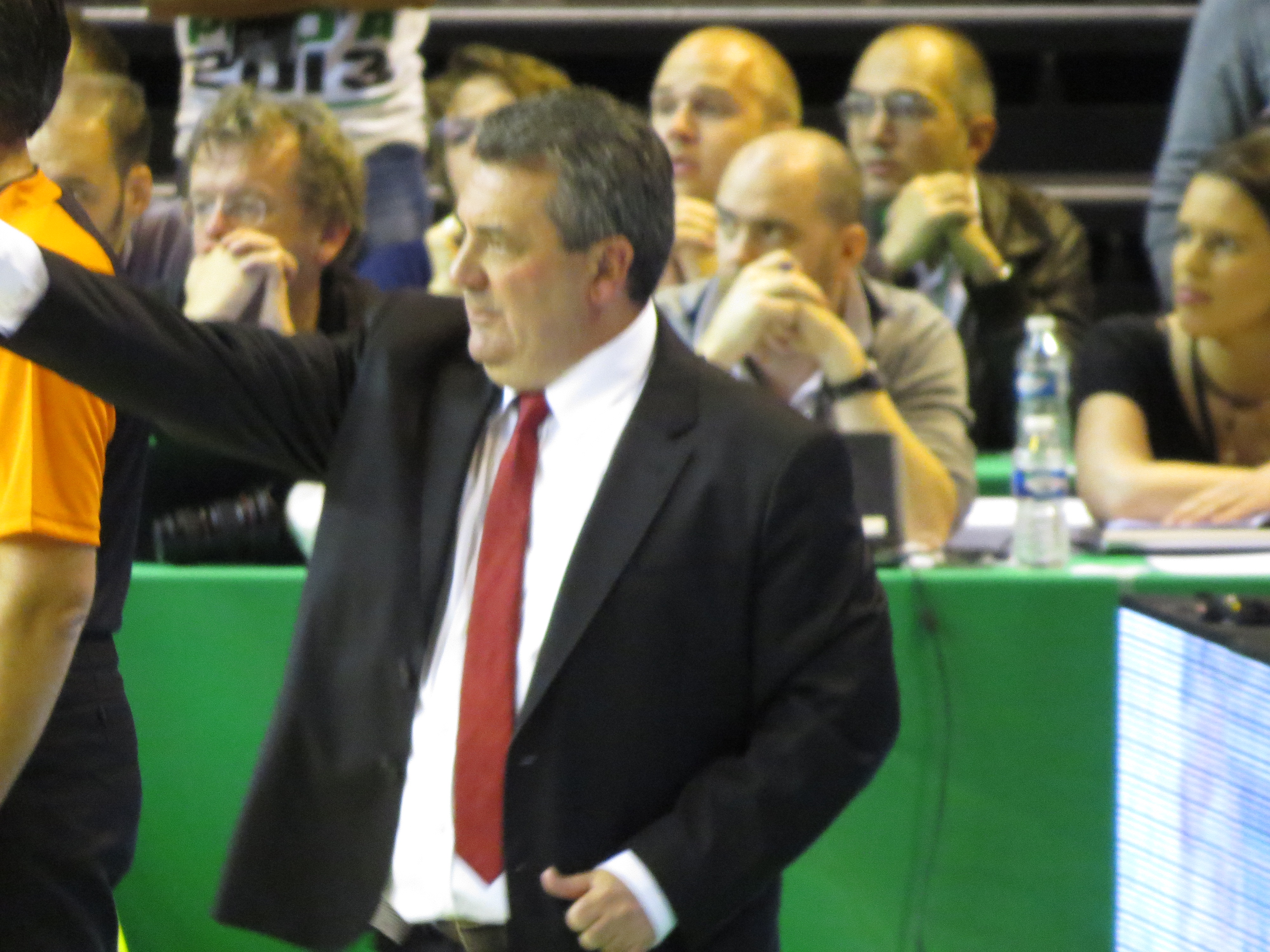
- Donnadieu, coaching Nanterre in the EuroLeague, in 2013.

Personal information
- Born: 29 May 1964 (age 62) Suresnes, France
- Position: Head coach
- Coaching career: 1987–present

Career history

Coaching
- 1987–2024: Nanterre 92
- 2014–2016: France Under-23
- 2016–present: France (assistant)

Career highlights
- As head coach: French LNB Pro A Best Coach (2019); FIBA Europe Cup champion (2017); FIBA EuroChallenge champion (2015); French League champion (2013); 2× French Cup winner (2014, 2017); 2× French Supercup winner (2014, 2017); French 2nd Division champion (2011); French 2nd Division Best Coach (2011)

Pascal Donnadieu (born 29 May 1964) is a French former basketball player and professional basketball coach.

== Playing career ==
Donnadieu ended his basketball playing career in 1991, at age 27. He retired due to knee injuries.

== Coaching career ==
=== Clubs ===
For years, Donnadieu's club coaching career has been strictly related to the French League club Nanterre 92, of which, he has been the long-time head coach. In 2024 he parted ways with the club after 37 seasons as head coach.

=== French national team ===
Early in 2014, Donnadieu was appointed the head coach of the French Under-23 national team. In 2016, he became an assistant coach of the senior men's French national basketball team.
