= LNB Élite Finals MVP =

Basketball award

The LNB Élite Finals MVP is an annual basketball award that is given by the top-tier level league in France, the LNB Pro A. It is awarded to the player that is chosen as the most valuable player of the league's playoff's finals, of a given LNB Élite season.

== Winners ==
^	Denotes player who is still active in the Pro A
*	Inducted into the FIBA Hall of Fame or the French Basketball Academy
Player (X)	Denotes the number of times the player has received the award

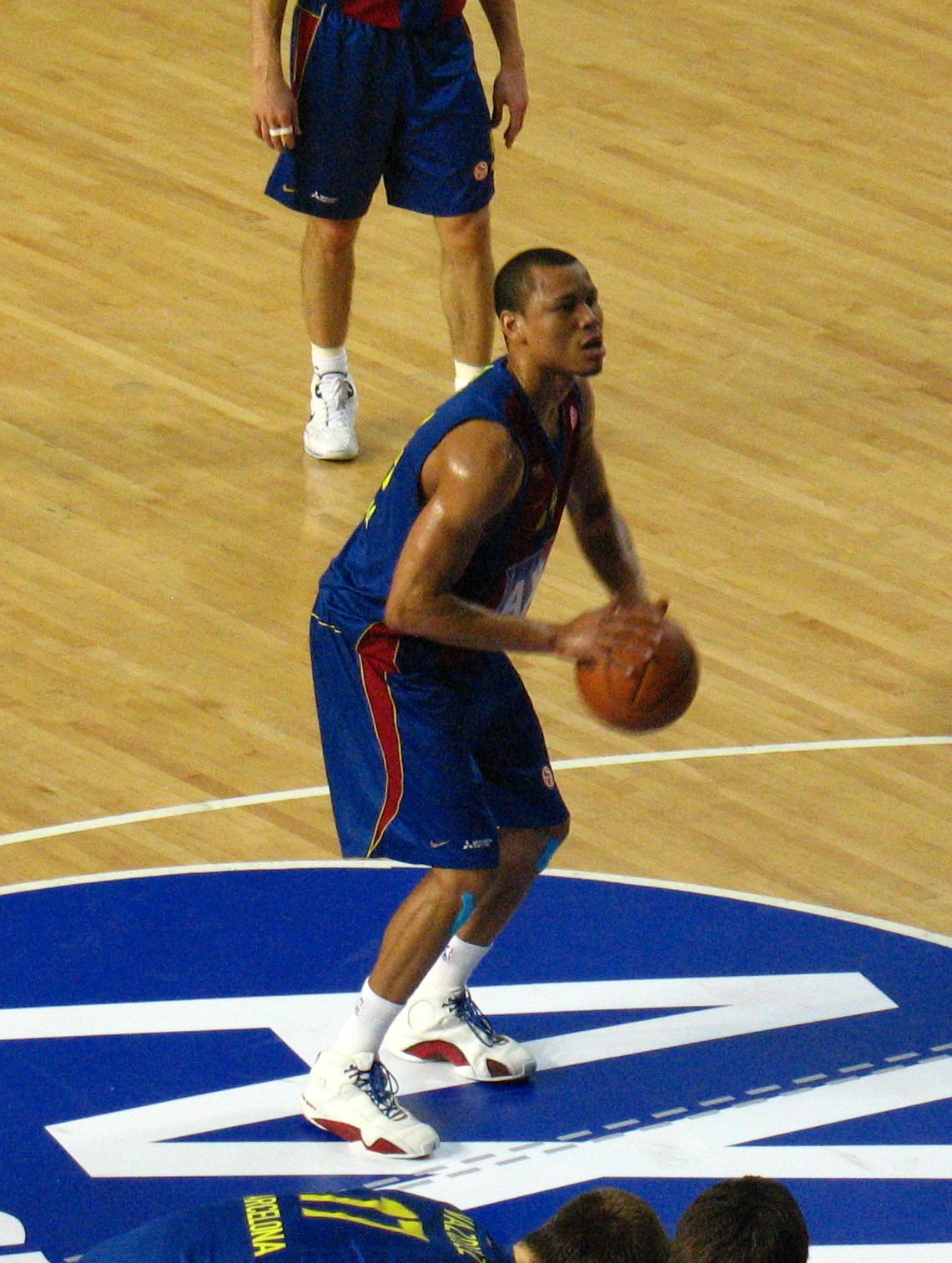
Alex Acker won the award in the 2013–14 season

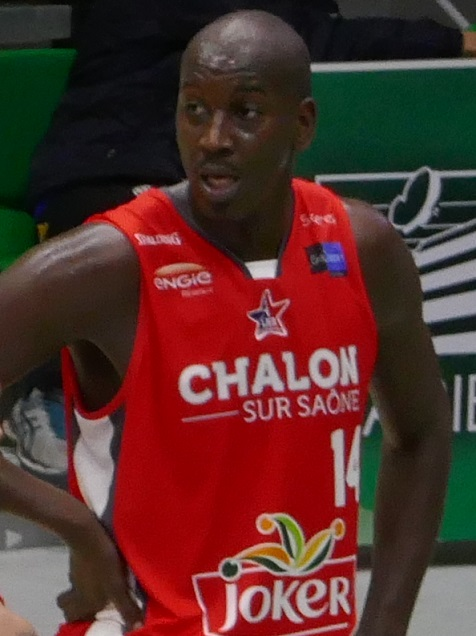
Ousmane Camara won the award in 2015

Season	Player	Position	Nationality	Club	Ref
2004–05	Ricardo Greer	Forward	Dominican Republic	SIG Strasbourg	
2005–06	Hüseyin Beşok	Forward	Turkey	Le Mans	
2006–07	Marc Salyers	Forward	United States	Chorale Roanne	
2008–09	Amara Sy	Forward	France	ASVEL	
2009–10	Mickaël Gelabale	Forward	France	Cholet	
2010–11	John Linehan	Guard	United States	SLUC Nancy	
2011–12	Blake Schilb	Forward	Czech Republic	Élan Chalon	
2012–13	David Lighty^	Guard	United States	Nanterre	
2013–14	Alex Acker	Guard	Italy	Limoges	
2014–15	Ousmane Camara	Forward	France	Limoges	
2015–16	Casper Ware	Guard	United States	ASVEL	
2016–17	Jérémy Nzeulie	Guard	Cameroon (Note: Nzeulie, born in Choisy-le-Roi, also owns the French nationality.)	Élan Chalon	
2017–18 (Note: Denotes season in which co-winners were awarded.)	Chris Lofton	Guard	United States	Le Mans Sarthe	
2017–18	Romeo Travis	Forward	United States (Note: Travis also holds Macedonian citizenship as of 2016.)	Le Mans Sarthe	
2018–19	DeMarcus Nelson	Guard	United States (Note: Nelson also holds Serbian citizenship as of 2014.)	ASVEL Basket	
2019–20	Not awarded (Note: There was no awarding in the 2019–20, because the season was cancelled due to the coronavirus pandemic in Europe.)				
2020–21	David Lighty (2)^	Guard	United States	ASVEL	
2021–22	Elie Okobo	Guard	France	ASVEL	
2022–23	Jordan Loyd	Guard	USA	Monaco	
2023–24	Mike James	Guard	USA	Monaco	
2024–25	T. J. Shorts	Guard	MKD	Paris Basketball	

== See also ==
- LNB Pro A MVP
- LNB Pro A Awards
