= Johan Passave-Ducteil =

French basketball player

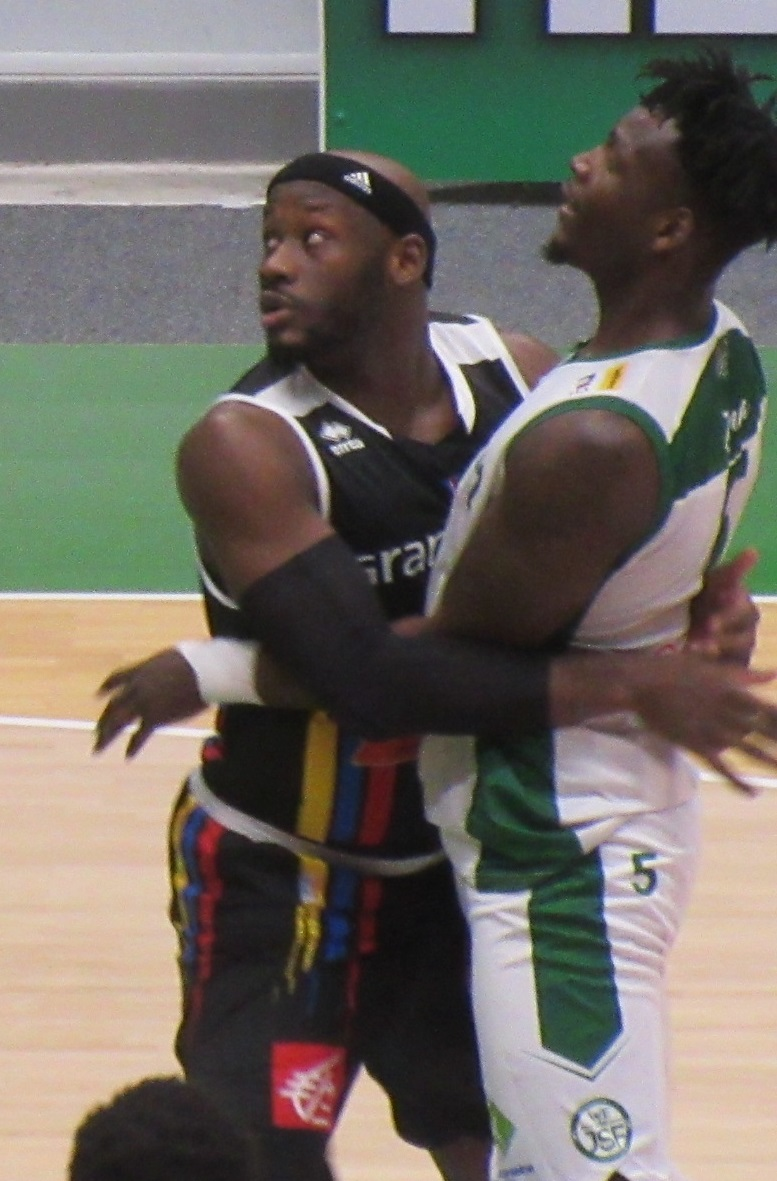
- Passave-Ducteil for Dijon in 2017

Free Agent
- Position: Center

Personal information
- Born: 13 July 1985 (age 41) Noisy-le-Grand, France
- Listed height: 2.00 m (6 ft 7 in)
- Listed weight: 108 kg (238 lb)

Career information
- NBA draft: 2007: undrafted
- Playing career: 2003–present

Career history
- 2003–2008: Saint-Étienne
- 2008–2010: Limoges CSP
- 2010–2015: JSF Nanterre
- 2015–2016: JL Bourg-en-Bresse
- 2016–2017: JDA Dijon
- 2017–2018: Nanterre 92
- 2018–2020: Châlons-Reims
- 2020–2022: ESSM Le Portel
- 2022–2023: Fos Provence Basket

Career highlights
- Pro A champion (2013); French Cup winner (2014); 2x Match des Champions champion (2014, 2017); EuroChallenge champion (2015); French National 3x3 Champion (2020)

Johan Passave-Ducteil (born 13 July 1985) is a French basketball player who last played for Fos Provence Basket of the LNB Pro A.

== 3x3 career ==
As part of Team Paris, Passave-Ducteil won the 2020 French Championship alongside teammates Angelo Tsagarakis, Léopold Cavalière and Antoine Eito.

== Honours ==
- Pro A (1): 2013
- Pro B (1): 2011
- Pro A All-Star (2): 2013, 2014
