= David Lighty =

American basketball player (born 1988)

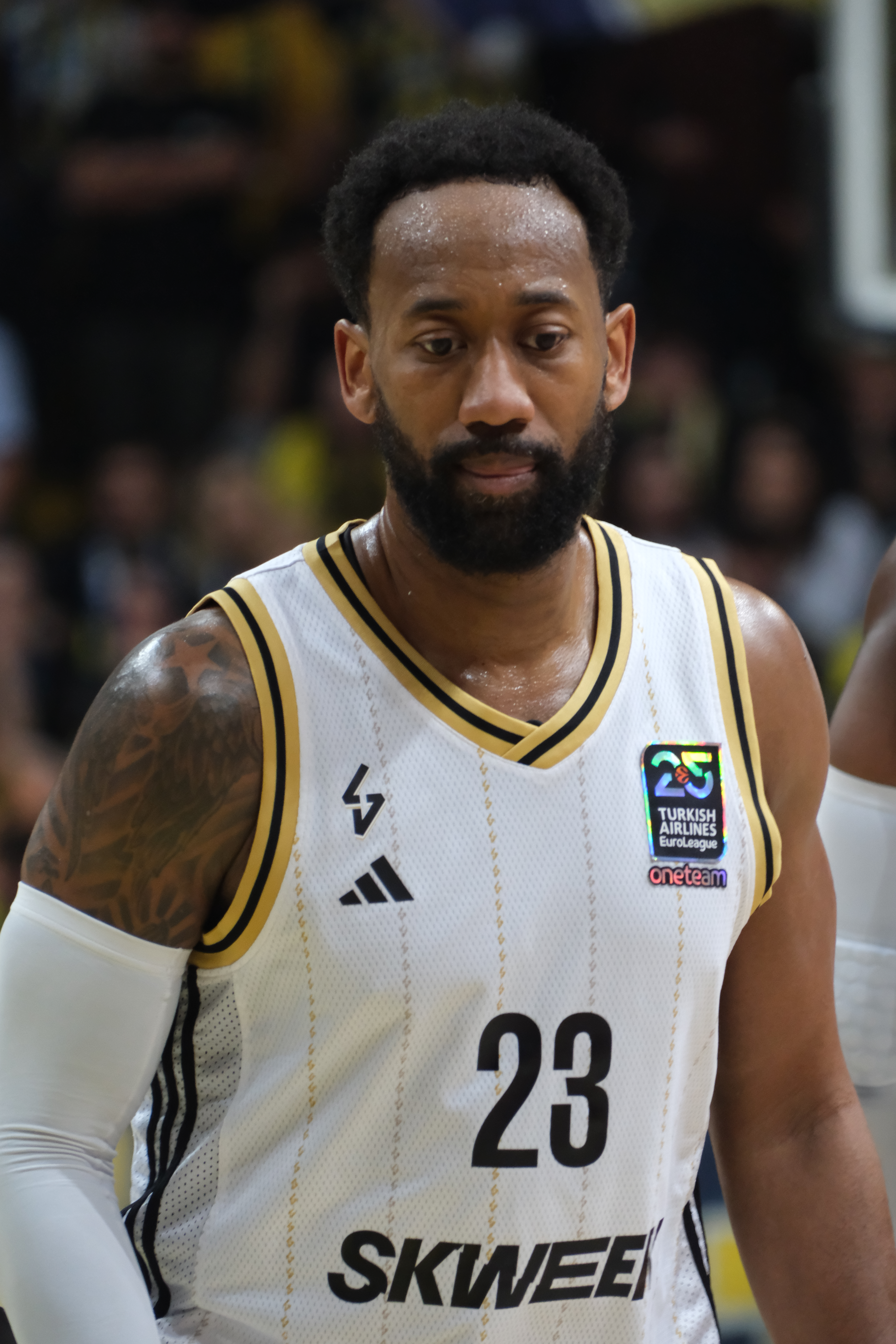
- Lighty with LDLC ASVEL Villeurbanne in 2025

No. 23 – ASVEL
- Position: Small forward / power forward
- League: LNB Élite; EuroLeague

Personal information
- Born: May 27, 1988 (age 38) Cleveland, Ohio, U.S.
- Listed height: 1.99 m (6 ft 6 in)
- Listed weight: 216 lb (98 kg)

Career information
- High school: Villa Angela-St. Joseph (Cleveland, Ohio)
- College: Ohio State (2006–2011)
- NBA draft: 2011: undrafted
- Playing career: 2011–present

Career history
- 2011: Cantù
- 2011–2012: Vanoli Cremona
- 2012–2014: Nanterre
- 2014–2016: ASVEL
- 2016–2017: Aquila Trento
- 2017: Dinamo Sassari
- 2017–present: ASVEL

Career highlights
- 5× French League champion (2013, 2016, 2019, 2021, 2022); 2x French League Finals MVP (2013, 2021); 3× French Cup winner (2014, 2019, 2021); French Supercup champion (2016); 2× French League All-Star (2013, 2019); Second-team All-Big Ten (2011); Big Ten All-Defensive team (2011); NIT champion (2008)
Medals
Men's basketball
Representing United States
FIBA U19 World Championship
Silver medal – second place	2007 Novi Sad	Team competition

David Maurice Lighty Jr. (born May 27, 1988) is an American professional basketball player and the team captain for ASVEL of the LNB Élite and the EuroLeague. He played college basketball at Ohio State University. Lighty ended his college career as the all-time leader in career games played in NCAA Division I men's basketball with 157, a record that eventually fell in 2022 to Jordan Bohannon of Iowa.

== High school career ==
Lighty attended and played basketball at Villa Angela-St. Joseph High School. The Plain Dealer named him player of the year in 2005. Lighty averaged 22 points per game during his senior year and led VASJ to a state runner-up finish.

== College career ==
Lighty did not see much playing time during his freshman year. He averaged 3.7 points and 2.3 rebounds in 16 minutes per game off the bench. During the NCAA Tournament, Lighty averaged 7.0 points per game and hit a game-tying 3-pointer late in the regional semi-final game against Tennessee. Lighty was moved into the Buckeyes' starting lineup for his sophomore year.

Lighty was injured in December 2008 and missed the rest of the 2008–09 season. He received a medical red-shirt for the year. Lighty returned for his junior season in 2009–10. As a junior, he averaged 12.6 points, 3.0 assists, 4.5 rebounds and 1.6 steals per game.

As a senior, he was picked to the Fifth Team All-America by Fox Sports.

== Professional career ==
Lighty went undrafted in the 2011 NBA draft. On July 8, 2011, Lighty signed a two-year deal with Bennet Cantù of Italy. On December 6, 2011, he and Bennet Cantù agreed to part ways. On the same day, he signed with Guerino Vanoli Basket for the rest of the 2011–12 season.

In August 2012, he signed with JSF Nanterre for the 2012–13 season.

On September 30, 2013, he signed with the Atlanta Hawks. However, he was later waived by the Hawks on October 14, 2013.

On November 7, 2013, he re-signed with JSF Nanterre for the 2013–14 season.

On June 3, 2014, he signed a two-year deal with LDLC ASVEL Villeurbanne.

In July 2016, Lighty joined the New Orleans Pelicans for the 2016 NBA Summer League.

On July 24, 2016, he signed a one-year deal with Italian club Aquila Basket Trento. On December 18, 2016, Lighty scored a career-high 34 points in an 85–68 win over the Pallacanestro Varese.

On February 24, 2017, he left Trento and signed with Dinamo Sassari for the rest of the season.

On June 14, 2017, he signed a two-year contract with his former club LDLC ASVEL Villeurbanne. He extended his contract until 2024 on June 4, 2020.

=== The Basketball Tournament ===
Lighty joined Carmen's Crew, composed primarily of Ohio State alumni, in The Basketball Tournament 2020. He scored 21 points as the team was upset by House of Paign, 76–68, in the first round.

== Career statistics ==
Legend
GP	Games played	GS	Games started	MPG	Minutes per game
FG%	Field-goal percentage	3P%	3-point field-goal percentage	FT%	Free-throw percentage
RPG	Rebounds per game	APG	Assists per game	SPG	Steals per game
BPG	Blocks per game	PPG	Points per game	PIR	Performance index rating
**Bold**	Career high

=== EuroLeague ===
Year	Team	GP	GS	MPG	FG%	3P%	FT%	RPG	APG	SPG	BPG	PPG	PIR
2011–12	Cantù	5	0	8.8	.385	.200	.750	.8	.4	.4	—	2.8	1.8
2013–14	Nanterre	7	6	**30.4**	.429	.346	.556	**3.9**	**2.7**	.7	**.6**	**11.3**	**11.7**
2019–20	ASVEL	27	6	22.9	.465	.354	.814	2.6	1.7	.9	.1	9.8	9.5
2020–21	ASVEL	**33**	**25**	25.3	.488	.351	**.861**	2.8	1.9	**1.0**	—	**11.3**	10.7
2021–22	ASVEL	11	9	25.4	**.547**	**.583**	.652	2.7	1.3	.5	.1	10.1	10.6
2022–23	ASVEL	28	19	22.8	.457	.426	.729	2.4	1.5	.7	.0	8.1	7.4
2023–24	ASVEL	29	**25**	16.5	.376	.349	.733	1.4	1.0	.6	.0	3.3	2.7
Career		140	90	22.2	.465	.380	.765	2.4	1.5	.8	.1	8.3	7.9

=== EuroCup ===
Year	Team	GP	GS	MPG	FG%	3P%	FT%	RPG	APG	SPG	BPG	PPG	PIR
2013–14	JSF Nanterre	8	5	29.3	.443	.348	**.857**	2.5	3.4	.5	—	10.3	8.6
2014–15	ASVEL	10	8	29.0	.467	**.450**	.741	**3.2**	2.9	.6	—	8.5	11.0
2017–18	ASVEL	**16**	9	25.3	.455	.382	.683	2.9	3.4	.8	.3	9.4	9.8
2018–19	ASVEL	12	**12**	**29.8**	**.580**	.333	.800	3.0	**5.8**	**1.7**	**.5**	**13.2**	**17.2**
Career		18	12	26.6	.476	.265	.800	2.4	2.9	1.1	.3	8.8	10.4

=== Basketball Champions League ===
Year	Team	GP	GS	MPG	FG%	3P%	FT%	RPG	APG	SPG	BPG	PPG
2016–17	Dinamo Sassari	4	2	25.2	.458	.286	.571	4.0	2.2	1.2	—	7.0
Career		4	2	25.2	.458	.286	.571	4.0	2.2	1.2	—	7.0

=== FIBA Europe Cup ===
Year	Team	GP	GS	MPG	FG%	3P%	FT%	RPG	APG	SPG	BPG	PPG
2015–16	ASVEL	14	5	26.0	.489	.250	.787	2.4	2.8	1.3	.2	9.6
Career		14	5	26.0	.489	.250	.787	2.4	2.8	1.3	.2	9.6

=== Domestic leagues ===
Year	Team	League	GP	MPG	FG%	3P%	FT%	RPG	APG	SPG	BPG	PPG
2011–12	(Italy) Cantù	LBA	8	15.3	.590	.500	.833	2.5	1.0	.6	—	7.5
2011–12	(Italy) Vanoli Cremona	LBA	23	30.9	.434	.327	.789	5.0	1.2	1.1	.1	10.7
2012–13	(France) JSF Nanterre	Pro A	35	31.9	.494	.425	.776	3.7	2.7	1.2	.1	12.5
2013–14	(France) JSF Nanterre	Pro A	23	26.4	.414	.339	.706	3.5	2.5	1.3	.1	8.6
2014–15	(France) ASVEL	Pro A	37	28.4	.471	.384	.747	3.0	2.7	1.0	.1	11.1
2015–16	(France) ASVEL	Pro A	45	23.7	.437	.469	.758	2.3	2.3	.9	.1	8.7
2016–17	(Italy) Aquila Trento	LBA	15	30.5	.444	.228	.758	2.4	2.4	1.5	.2	13.1
2016–17	(Italy) Dinamo Sassari	LBA	11	22.7	.446	.200	.750	2.9	2.1	1.0	—	7.2
2017–18	(France) ASVEL	Pro A	37	25.2	.484	.365	.793	2.7	2.8	1.3	.1	9.1
2018–19	(France) ASVEL	LNB Élite	43	25.3	.493	.430	.716	3.5	2.4	1.0	.1	9.4
2019–20	(France) ASVEL	LNB Élite	25	22.4	.429	.370	.702	3.0	1.6	.7	.2	8.8
2020–21	(France) ASVEL	LNB Élite	36	22.6	.474	.378	.843	1.9	1.9	.7	.1	9.4
2021–22	(France) ASVEL	LNB Élite	29	22.7	.421	.349	.809	2.1	1.7	.8	.1	7.4
2022–23	(France) ASVEL	LNB Élite	38	22.3	.435	.293	.755	2.6	2.2	.5	.0	6.5
2023–24	(France) ASVEL	LNB Élite	31	19.0	.518	.429	.857	1.5	1.2	.4	.0	4.7

=== College ===
Year	Team	GP	GS	MPG	FG%	3P%	FT%	RPG	APG	SPG	BPG	PPG
2006–07	Ohio State	**39**	7	16.3	.374	.200	**.685**	2.3	1.0	.5	.2	3.7
2007–08	Ohio State	37	**37**	32.0	.445	.327	.623	3.6	2.4	1.3	.2	9.0
2008–09	Ohio State	7	7	32.9	.471	.263	.536	**5.7**	1.9	1.4	.3	9.7
2009–10	Ohio State	37	**37**	**36.3**	**.492**	.383	.632	4.5	3.0	**1.6**	**.5**	**12.6**
2010–11	Ohio State	37	36	32.1	.468	**.429**	.627	4.0	**3.3**	1.5	**.5**	12.1
Career		157	124	29.2	.459	.358	.629	3.7	2.4	1.2	.3	9.3

== Personal ==
Lighty is the son of David Sr. and Emily Lighty. Lighty has a son with WNBA Washington Mystics player Tayler Hill, who was born June 18, 2014.

== See also ==
- List of NCAA Division I men's basketball career games played leaders
