= Brian Conklin =

American basketball player (born 1989)

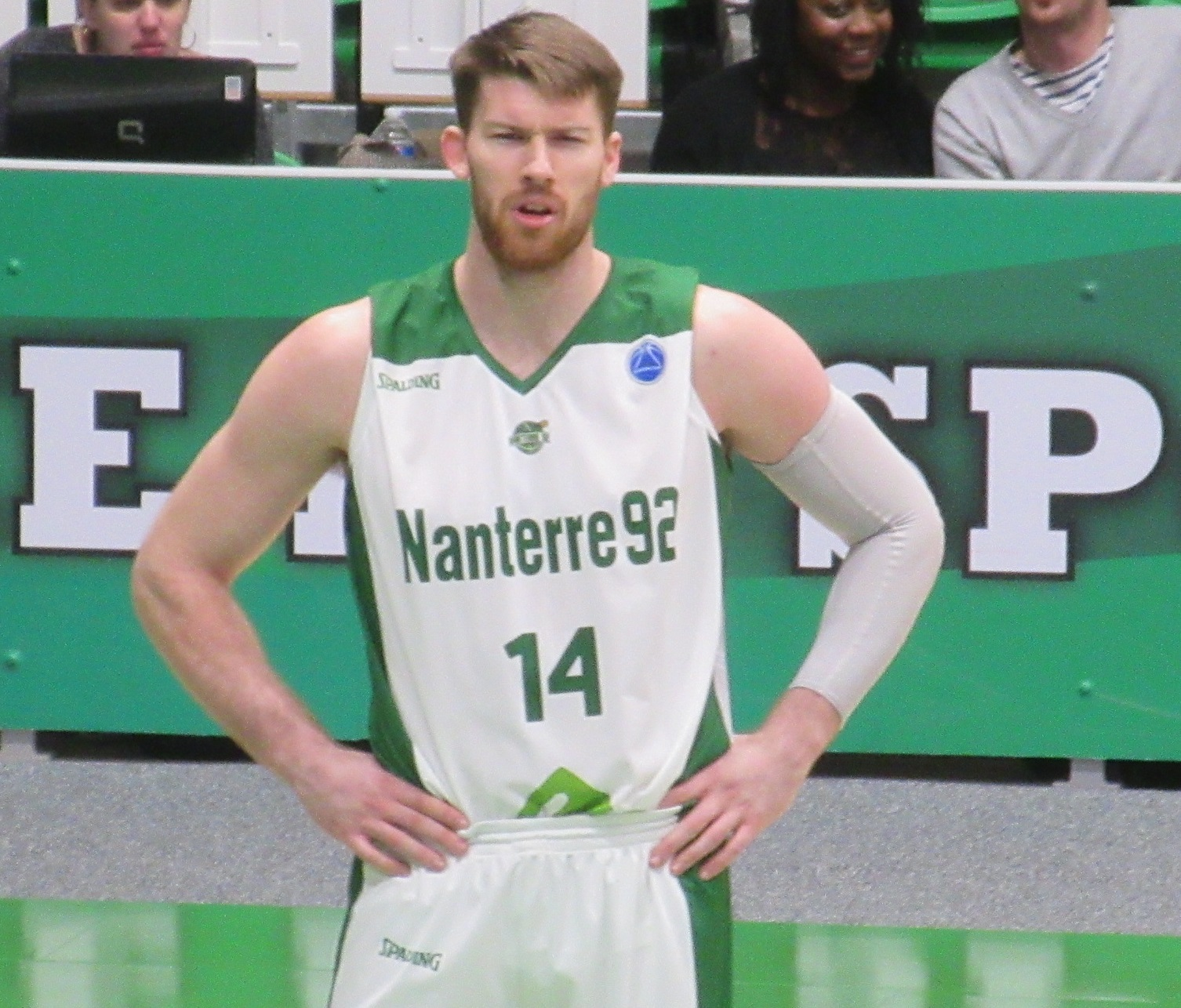
- Conklin with Nanterre 92 in 2017

Personal information
- Born: September 5, 1989 (age 37) Eugene, Oregon, U.S.
- Listed height: 6 ft 6 in (1.98 m)
- Listed weight: 230 lb (104 kg)

Career information
- High school: North Eugene (Eugene, Oregon)
- College: Saint Louis (2008–2012)
- NBA draft: 2012: undrafted
- Playing career: 2013–2024
- Position: Power forward

Career history
- 2013–2014: Southland Sharks
- 2013–2015: Townsville Crocodiles
- 2015: Cangrejeros de Santurce
- 2016: Piratas de Quebradillas
- 2016: Leones de Santo Domingo
- 2016–2017: Nanterre 92
- 2017–2018: Limoges CSP
- 2018–2019: Illawarra Hawks
- 2019: Piratas de Quebradillas
- 2019: Indios de Mayagüez
- 2019–2020: Limoges CSP
- 2020–2021: Nanterre 92
- 2021: Indios de Mayagüez
- 2021: Semt77 Yalovaspor
- 2022–2023: FC Porto
- 2023: Panteras de Aguascalientes
- 2023: Halcones de Xalapa
- 2024: Ibaraki Robots

Career highlights
- BSN Most Valuable Player (2019); BSN All-Star Team (2019); FIBA Europe Cup champion (2017); French Cup champion (2017); LNB champion (2016); NBL MVP (2015); All-NBL First Team (2015); All-NBL Second Team (2014); NZNBL champion (2013); NZNBL Most Outstanding Forward (2013); NZNBL All-Star Five (2013); First-team All-Atlantic 10 (2012); Second-team Academic All-American (2012)

Brian Christopher Conklin (born September 5, 1989) is an American former professional basketball player. He played college basketball for the Saint Louis Billikens before playing professionally in New Zealand, Australia, Puerto Rico, Dominican Republic, France, Turkey, Portugal, Mexico, and Japan.

== High school career ==
Conklin attended North Eugene High School in Eugene, Oregon. As a junior in 2006–07, he averaged 19.6 points and 11.3 rebounds per game, leading his team to a perfect 28–0 record, the 5A Oregon State championship and was subsequently named the 2007 Player of the Year. As a senior in 2007–08, he averaged 20.4 points, 11.2 rebounds, 4.6 assists, 2.7 blocks and 1.3 steals per game, leading his team to a 25–4 record and the No. 1 ranking in the state.

== College career ==
As a freshman at Saint Louis in 2008–09, Conklin ranked seventh on the SLU freshman list for field goal shooting with 52.2%. In 32 games (29 starts), he averaged 6.1 points and 3.9 rebounds in 22.5 minutes per game.

As a sophomore in 2009–10, Conklin recorded 56 offensive rebounds, the second-most on the team. He was also named to the Atlantic 10 Conference All-Academic team. In 36 games (16 starts), he averaged 6.2 points and 3.5 rebounds in 20.8 minutes per game.

As a junior in 2010–11, Conklin was named to the Atlantic 10 Conference All-Academic team for the second straight season. He was also named to the Cancun Governor's Cup All-Tournament team after averaging a team-best 14.0 points during the three-day tournament. In 31 games (24 starts), he averaged 8.7 points and 4.3 rebounds in 21.4 minutes per game.

As a senior in 2011–12, Conklin was named to the Atlantic 10 Conference All-Academic team for the third straight season. He also earned first-team All-Atlantic 10 honors. In 34 games (33 starts), he averaged 13.9 points, 4.6 rebounds and 1.2 assists in 29.4 minutes per game.

== Professional career ==
=== Southland Sharks and Townsville Crocodiles (2013–2015) ===
After finishing college, Conklin was not picked up in the NBA draft and was left pondering his future for nine months before being offered a contract. In March 2013, Conklin moved to New Zealand to begin his professional career with the Southland Sharks. He made an immediate impact in the Southland setup and on the New Zealand league, recording 21 points and nine rebounds to help the Sharks defeat the Nelson Giants 92–81 in the grand final in July. For the season, he was named Most Outstanding Forward and earned All-Star Five honors. In 18 games, he averaged 22.2 points, 9.3 rebounds and 1.3 steals per game.

On June 30, 2013, Conklin signed with the Townsville Crocodiles in Australia for the 2013–14 NBL season. On November 8, 2013, he scored 33 points in a 91–78 win over the New Zealand Breakers. It was the second-highest score by a Crocs player since 40-minute games were introduced into the NBL in 2010. Conklin appeared in the first 24 games of the season before missing the final four games with a hamstring injury he sustained on March 1, 2014, against the Melbourne Tigers. He was a revelation for the club during the season, using his strength and speed to overcome any height disadvantage and established himself among the top seven scorers in the league. He topped the Crocodiles in scoring, averaging 16.3 points at 49.3 per cent while pulling down an average of 4.8 rebounds per game. He was subsequently voted into the All-NBL Second Team.

In December 2013, Conklin re-signed with the Southland Sharks for the 2014 New Zealand NBL season. In 2014, he was one of the NBL's better players despite carrying hamstring and ankle injuries. In 14 games, he averaged 20.1 points and 9.7 rebounds per game. In December 2014, he confirmed he would not be returning to the Sharks for the 2015 season.

On July 1, 2014, Conklin re-signed with the Townsville Crocodiles for the 2014–15 NBL season. On January 3, 2015, he recorded 33 points and 11 rebounds in a 79–75 loss to the Cairns Taipans. He subsequently earned Player of the Week honors for Round 13. On February 28, 2015, he was named the NBL's Most Valuable Player for the 2014–15 season. He finished fourth in the league in scoring, averaging 18.9 points per game with 6.4 rebounds on 50.7 per cent shooting from the field. He also finished the regular season leading the league in total two pointers made (188) and total free throws made (151) to go alongside six total double-doubles. Conklin also received an All-NBL First Team nod to cap off the season.

On July 15, 2015, Conklin re-signed with the Crocodiles for the 2015–16 NBL season. Heading into his third season, Conklin was appointed team captain. On November 4, 2015, Conklin was involved in an ugly on-court incident involving Perth Wildcats guard Damian Martin, where during the fourth quarter of the Crocodiles' 89–77 win over the Wildcats, Conklin's errant elbow collided with and broke Martin's jaw. Despite a call from Australian basketball legend Andrew Gaze for Conklin to be suspended for at least six weeks, the NBL cleared Conklin of any wrongdoing. Less than two weeks after the Martin encounter, Conklin was in the spotlight again for another elbow incident, this time for striking Adelaide 36ers forward Mitch Creek in a similar manner. He subsequently received a three-match suspension with two of those games suspended for the rest of the season. In that game against the 36ers, Conklin recorded 21 points and 12 rebounds in an 89–65 loss. By the end of November, the Crocodiles had accumulated a 4–10 record. As a result, due to what the club claimed as a number of "sub-par performances", the Crocodiles terminated Conklin's contract on November 30. In response, Conklin claimed he would consider legal advice before continuing his career either in the NBL or overseas, believing he was unfairly treated by the club. In 13 games for the Crocodiles in 2015–16, he averaged 13.5 points, 6.6 rebounds and 1.6 assists per game.

=== Puerto Rico and Dominican Republic (2015–2016) ===
Following the 2014–15 NBL season, Conklin joined Cangrejeros de Santurce of the Baloncesto Superior Nacional (BSN). In 34 games for Santurce, he averaged 11.6 points, 5.4 rebounds and 1.3 assists per game.

In February 2016, Conklin joined Piratas de Quebradillas. On March 15, 2016, Conklin was involved in a third in-game elbow incident, this time while playing for Quebradillas. During his team's game against Capitanes de Arecibo, Conklin threw an elbow backwards and landed on the head of Renaldo Balkman, causing Balkman to fall to the ground and lose consciousness. Conklin was subsequently suspended by the BSN for one game and fined $1,500. In 35 games for Quebradillas, he averaged 15.0 points, 6.5 rebounds and 2.0 assists per game.

On June 30, 2016, Conklin signed with Leones de Santo Domingo of the Liga Nacional de Baloncesto (LNB). In September 2016, he helped Leones win the LNB title. In 31 games, he averaged 14.8 points, 5.8 rebounds and 1.8 assists per game.

=== France (2016–2018) ===
On September 26, 2016, Conklin signed with French club Nanterre 92 for the 2016–17 Pro A season. In April 2017, he helped Nanterre win the French Cup and the FIBA Europe Cup. In 19 FIBA Europe Cup games, Conklin averaged 7.2 points and 4.1 rebounds per game. He also averaged 8.9 points and 3.1 rebounds in 34 league games.

On June 7, 2017, Conklin signed with Limoges CSP for the 2017–18 Pro A season. In 39 league games, he averaged 8.6 points, 4.8 rebounds and 1.4 assists per game. He also averaged 8.0 points and 4.5 rebounds in 15 Eurocup games.

=== Illawarra Hawks (2018–2019) ===
On July 13, 2018, Conklin signed with the Illawarra Hawks for the 2018–19 NBL season, returning to the league for a second stint. He appeared in all 28 games for the Hawks in 2018–19, averaging 14.6 points, 5.4 rebounds and 2.2 assists per game.

=== Return to Puerto Rico (2019) ===
On February 11, 2019, Conklin signed with Piratas de Quebradillas for the 2019 BSN season, returning to the club for a second stint. On April 12, 2019, he was released by Quebradillas and signed with Indios de Mayagüez for the rest of the season. In 14 games for Quebradillas, he averaged 15.6 points, 5.5 rebounds and 1.7 assists. In July 2019, he was named BSN MVP and to the BSN All-Star team.

=== Limoges CSP (2019–2020) ===
On July 9, 2019, Conklin signed a one-year deal with Limoges CSP of the LNB Pro A, returning to the team for a second stint. He averaged 10.9 points and 4.3 rebounds per game.

=== Nanterre 92 (2020–2021) ===
On June 6, 2020, Conklin signed a deal to return to Nanterre 92.

=== Fourth stint in Puerto Rico (2021) ===
In June 2021, Conklin joined Indios de Mayagüez of the Baloncesto Superior Nacional, returning to the team for a second stint. He averaged 14.2 points, 5.5 rebounds, and 1.8 assists per game.

=== Semt77 Yalovaspor (2021) ===
On October 5, 2021, Conklin signed with Semt77 Yalovaspor of the Basketball Super League. He played 11 games between October 10 and December 19.

=== FC Porto (2022–2023) ===
On September 24, 2022, Conklin signed with FC Porto of the Liga Portuguesa de Basquetebol.

=== Mexico (2023) ===
Between August and November 2023, Conklin played for Panteras de Aguascalientes of the Mexican LNBP.

In December 2023, Conklin had a two-game stint with Mexican team Halcones de Xalapa in the Basketball Champions League Americas.

=== Japan (2024) ===
On January 9, 2024, Conklin signed with the Ibaraki Robots of the Japanese B.League. He appeared in his one and only game for Ibaraki on January 27.

== Personal life ==
In 2012, Conklin married his long-time partner, Kristina. The couple's first child was born in North Queensland in 2015.
