= Talib Zanna =

Nigerian basketball player (born 1990)

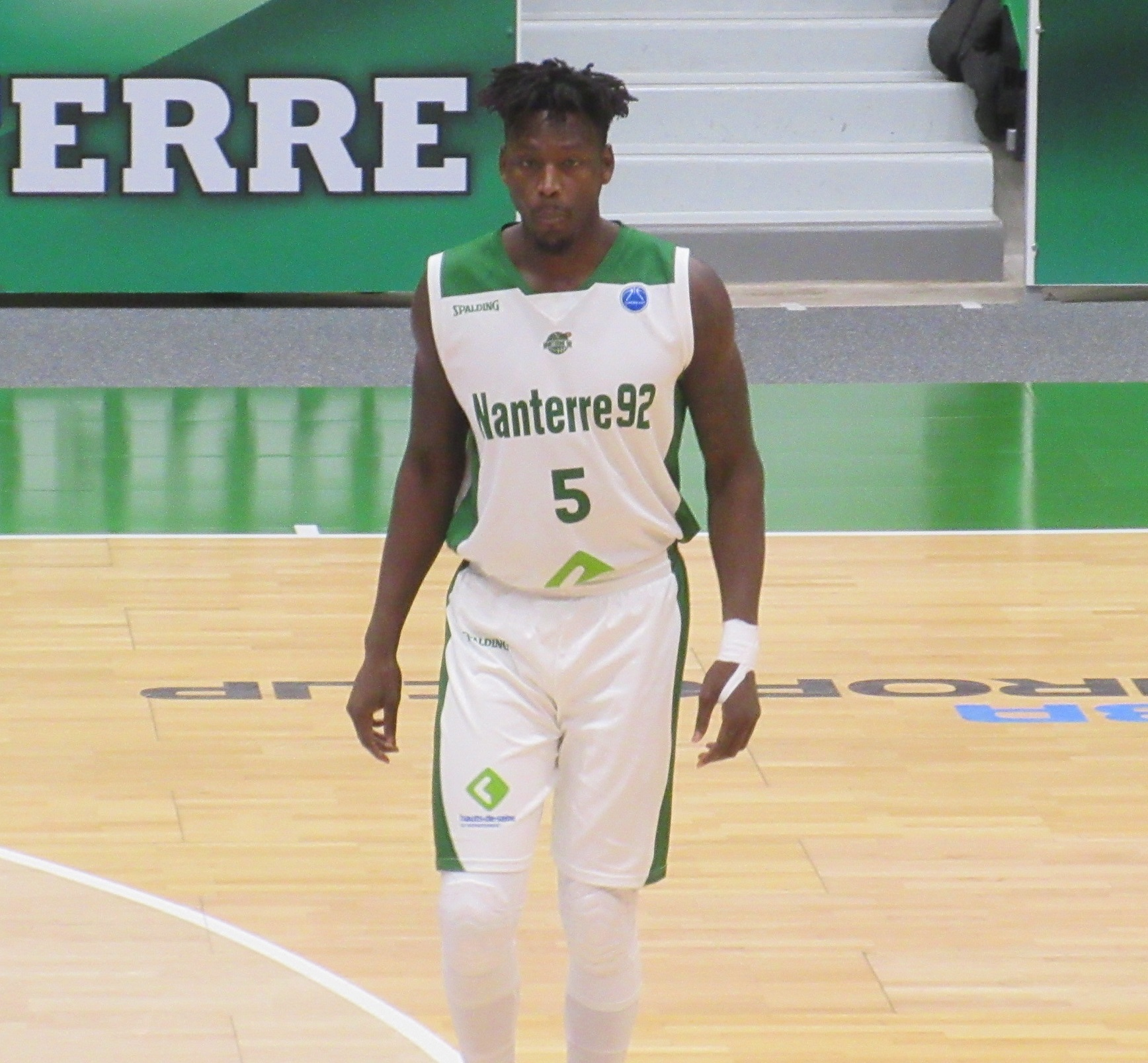
- Zanna with Nanterre 92 in 2017

Free agent
- Position: Center

Personal information
- Born: 1 October 1990 (age 36) Kaduna, Kaduna, Nigeria
- Listed height: 6 ft 9 in (2.06 m)
- Listed weight: 230 lb (104 kg)

Career information
- High school: Bishop McNamara (Forestville, Maryland)
- College: Pittsburgh (2009–2014)
- NBA draft: 2014: undrafted
- Playing career: 2014–present

Career history
- 2014–2016: Oklahoma City Blue
- 2016–2017: Nanterre 92
- 2017–2018: Ironi Nes Ziona
- 2018: Fuenlabrada
- 2019: Ironi Nes Ziona
- 2019–2020: Afyon Belediye
- 2020: Hapoel Tel Aviv
- 2022: Long Island Nets
- 2022: Agua Caliente Clippers
- 2022: Maine Celtics
- 2022: Oklahoma City Blue
- 2024: Spartak
- 2024: Cañeros del Este
- 2024: KK Cibona
- 2025: Tauranga Whai
- 2026: Venados de Mazatlán

Career highlights
- FIBA Europe Cup champion (2017); French Cup winner (2017); NBA D-League All-Rookie Second Team (2015); NBA D-League All-Star (2015); Honorable mention All-ACC (2014)
- Stats at Basketball Reference

Talib Zanna (born 1 October 1990) is a Nigerian professional basketball player who last played for the Tauranga Whai of the New Zealand National Basketball League (NZNBL). He played college basketball for the Pittsburgh Panthers before playing professionally in the NBA G League, France, Israel, Spain, Turkey, Bulgaria, Dominican Republic, and Croatia. In 2017, he won the FIBA Europe Cup and the French Cup with Nanterre 92.

== Early life ==
Zanna was born in Kaduna, Nigeria to Zanna Awami and Maimuna Zanna. He was brought up with three brothers and two sisters. He began playing basketball at the age of 10 years because of a growth spurt and urging from his brother. Zanna ran mountains to improve his speed, fitness, and vertical leap. He was eventually discovered by American coaches in a camp run by ex-Georgetown player, Godwin Owinje, in Lagos. In 2006, he moved to the United States and moved in with a host family. Upon arriving, he said the first few weeks were a disaster, as he struggled to communicate, did not understand the culture, and didn't like the taste of the food. Zanna called his father with the desire to return to Nigeria.

Zanna's brother, a Nigerian doctor, contacted Bishop McNamara basketball head coach Marty Keithline and asked for Zanna to be given an opportunity to get an American education and to have the opportunity to play basketball. He later visited South Africa for "Basketball Without Borders," with several other players, including Serge Ibaka, Dikembe Mutombo, Dirk Nowitzki and Luol Deng. Zanna said seeing an NBA player in person was a great experience. He also stated that it made him want to be in their position.

== High school career ==
Soon after arriving in the United States, Zanna attended Bishop McNamara High School in Forestville, Maryland. As a sophomore in 2006–07, he missed 17 games with a broken foot but still averaged 10 points and 11 rebounds per game. He finished his sophomore season by posting 17 points and 15 rebounds against Paul VI Catholic High School in the WCAC Tournament quarter-finals. As a junior in 2007–08, he averaged 15.0 points, 13.5 rebounds, 3.4 blocks, 1.5 assists and 1.4 steals per game as he earned All-Washington Catholic Athletic Conference accolades. He was also marked one of the top candidates for All-MET honors.

On 19 November 2008, Zanna signed a National Letter of Intent to play college basketball for the University of Pittsburgh. He was also recruited by Boston College, Connecticut, Oklahoma, Providence, South Florida, Saint Joseph's, Villanova, and West Virginia.

As a senior in 2008–09, Zanna averaged 14.6 points and 11.8 rebounds per game as he was named first-team All-MET by the Washington Post and earned Independent private school all-league honors.

== College career ==
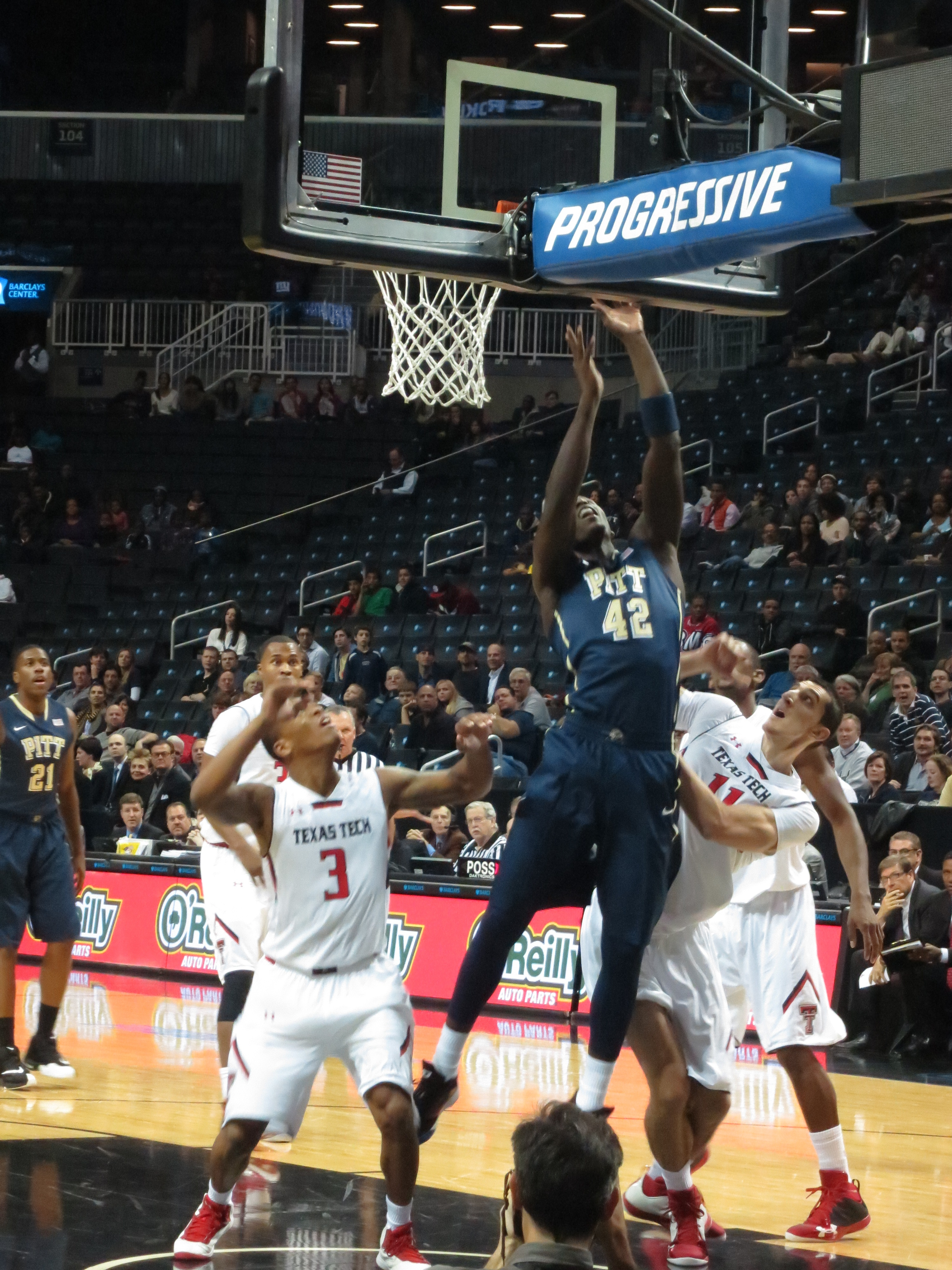
Zanna with Pittsburgh, 2013

As a freshman at Pittsburgh in 2009–10, Zanna managed just three minutes of action in the first game before a shoulder injury forced him to miss the entire season as he applied for a medical hardship waiver.

As a redshirted freshman in 2010–11, Zanna appeared in 27 games with 13 starting assignments. Despite missing the last seven games of the season due to a broken right thumb, Zanna still earned co-Most Improved Player honors at end of season team banquet. On the season, he averaged 3.7 points and 3.4 rebounds per game.

As a sophomore in 2011–12, Zanna appeared in all 39 games with 14 starting assignments. He registered three double-doubles, nine double figure scoring games and four double figure rebounding games, and at the end of season team banquet, he earned Best Defensive Player honors. On the season, he averaged 6.3 points and 5.5 rebounds per game.

As a junior in 2012–13, Zanna started all 33 games at power forward as his minutes per game reached 23.9. He totaled three 20-point games, 14 double figure scoring games and four double figure rebounding games, and at the end of season team banquet, he earned the Coaches' Award. On the season, he averaged 9.6 points and 6.1 rebounds per game.

As a senior in 2013–14, Zanna earned All-ACC honorable mention honors after averaging a career-best 13.0 points and 8.6 rebounds in 35 games (all starts).

== Professional career ==
=== Oklahoma City Blue (2014–2016) ===
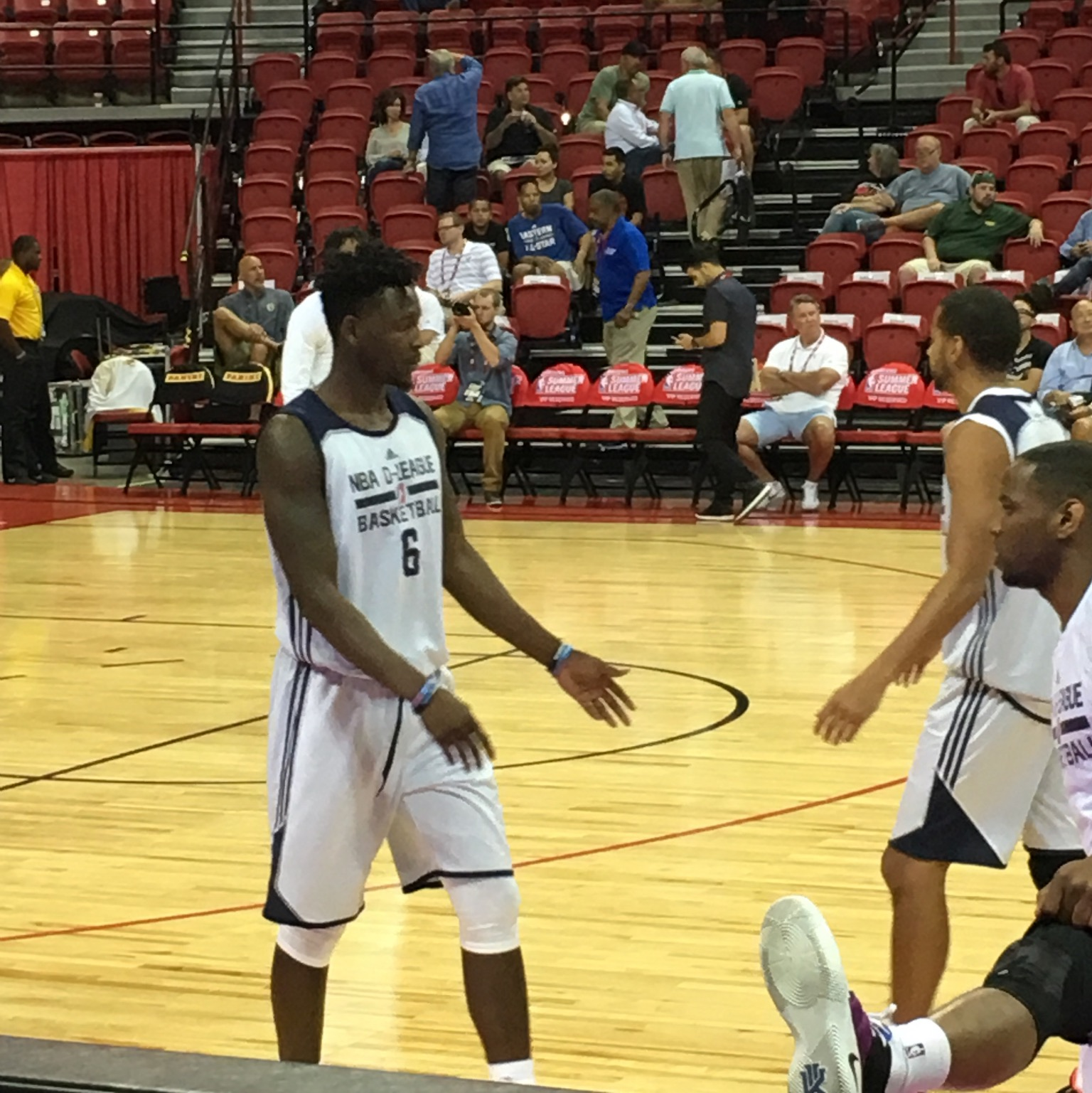
Zanna during the 2016 NBA Summer League

After going undrafted in the 2014 NBA draft, Zanna joined the Oklahoma City Thunder for the 2014 NBA Summer League. On 29 September 2014, he signed with the Thunder as he joined former Pitt teammate, Steven Adams, for the team's training camp. Zanna appeared in all seven of Oklahoma City's preseason contests, averaging 4.4 points and 5.0 rebounds in 17.4 minutes per game before he was waived by the team on October 24, 2014. He commented on his time with the Thunder, saying, "...this organization is like a family. Everyone is there for each other. Togetherness is really big in this organization." On 4 November 2014, he was acquired by the Oklahoma City Blue of the NBA Development League] as an affiliate player. He made his debut on November 14 against the Maine Red Claws, contributing 17 points and 15 rebounds. Zanna recorded eight double-doubles in his first 13 games, including four straight to begin the season. On 12 February 2015, he was named to the Futures All-Star team for the 2015 NBA D-League All-Star Game as a replacement for JaMychal Green.

In July 2015, Zanna joined the Oklahoma City Thunder for the Orlando Summer League and the Cleveland Cavaliers for the Las Vegas Summer League. On 25 September 2015, he signed with the Thunder, returning to the team's training camp for the second year in a row. However, on 22 October, he was again waived by the Thunder after appearing in four preseason games. On November 3, he returned with the Blue.

In July 2016, Zanna joined the D-League Select Team for the 2016 NBA Summer League.

=== Nanterre 92 (2016–2017) ===
On August 2, 2016, Zanna signed with Nanterre 92 of the French League. On April 26, 2017, Zanna and Nanterre parted ways one day after winning the FIBA Europe Cup title.

=== Ironi Nes Ziona and Fuenlabrada (2017–2019) ===
On August 12, 2017, Zanna signed with the Israeli team Ironi Nes Ziona for the 2017–18 season. On May 17, 2018, Zanna recorded a career-high 27 points, along with 12 rebounds and 3 steals in a 95–98 loss to Maccabi Tel Aviv. In 37 games played during the 2017–18 season, he averaged 13.9 points, 9.5 rebounds and 1.4 steals per game. Zanna helped Nes Ziona reach the 2018 Israeli League Playoffs, where they eventually were eliminated by Maccabi Tel Aviv.

On July 31, 2018, Zanna signed a one-year deal with the Spanish team Fuenlabrada. On November 28, 2018, Zanna parted ways with Fuenlabrada after appearing in 14 games.

On January 8, 2019, Zanna returned to Ironi Nes Ziona for a second stint, replacing Gerald Lee. On February 16, 2019, Zanna recorded a season-high 22 points, shooting 9-of-12 from the field, along with six rebounds and three steals in a 90–78 win over Hapoel Be'er Sheva.

=== Afyon Belediye (2019–2020) ===
On September 22, 2019, Zanna signed a one-year deal with Afyon Belediye of the Turkish Basketbol Süper Ligi.

=== Hapoel Tel Aviv (2020) ===
On May 15, 2020, Zanna signed with Hapoel Tel Aviv of the Israeli Basketball Premier League. Zanna averaged 10.8 points and 8.2 rebounds per game in 11 games during June and July 2020. He re-signed with the team on August 2, 2020 for the 2020–21 season. He appeared in three Israeli League games, three Balkan League games, and one BCL game, with his final game coming on November 16, 2020.

=== NBA G League (2022) ===
On January 12, 2022, Zanna was acquired by the Long Island Nets of the NBA G League. He was waived seven days later. On January 30, he was acquired by the Agua Caliente Clippers. He was then waived on February 9. On February 11, Zanna was acquired by the Maine Celtics, only to be waived again on February 27. On March 3, 2022, he was acquired by the Oklahoma City Blue, only to be waived once again on March 12.

=== Spartak (2024) ===
In January 2024, Zanna joined Spartak of the Bulgarian National Basketball League. In 21 games, he averaged 14.1 points, 9.2 rebounds and 1.3 steals per game.

=== Cañeros del Este (2024) ===
In July 2024, Zanna had a 10-game stint with Cañeros del Este of the Liga Nacional de Baloncesto.

=== KK Cibona (2024) ===
In October 2024, Zanna had an eight-game stint with KK Cibona of the Adriatic League and the Croatian League.

=== Tauranga Whai (2025) ===
In March 2025, Zanna joined the Tauranga Whai of the New Zealand National Basketball League (NZNBL) for the 2025 season. On May 12, 2025, he parted ways with the Whai.

== National team career ==
Zanna debuted for the Nigerian national team in 2017. He played for Nigeria at the 2019 FIBA Basketball World Cup.

== Personal life ==
Zanna's father died not long after he committed to Pittsburgh. During college, he had a picture of his father in his locker and touched it before every game while saying a prayer for him.

Zanna is fluent in four different languages and could speak English before arriving in the United States in 2006.

Zanna is a devout Muslim.
