= Trenton Meacham =

American basketball player

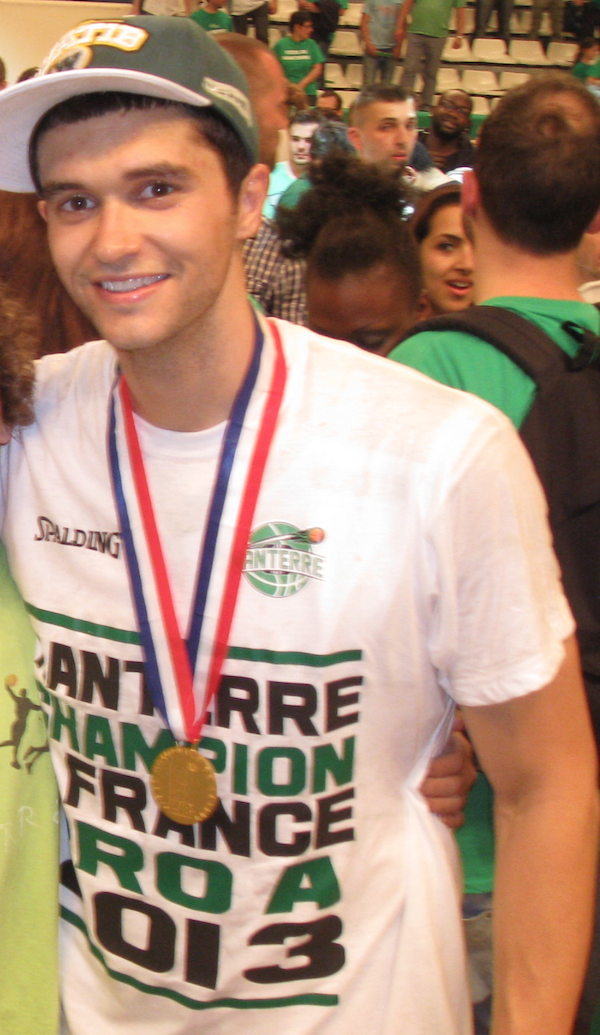
- Meacham after winning the French title with Nanterre in 2013

Personal information
- Born: September 26, 1985 (age 41) Champaign, Illinois
- Listed height: 6 ft 2 2/3 in (1.90 m)
- Listed weight: 195 lb (88 kg)

Career information
- High school: Champaign Centennial
- College: Dayton (2004–2005); Illinois (2006–2009)
- NBA draft: 2009: undrafted
- Playing career: 2009–2018
- Position: Point guard / shooting guard

Career history
- 2009–2010: WBC Wels
- 2010–2011: Göttingen
- 2011–2012: Paris-Levallois
- 2012–2014: JSF Nanterre
- 2014–2015: Emporio Armani Milano
- 2015–2017: ASVEL
- 2017–2018: Boulazac Dordogne

Career highlights
- 2× Pro A champion (2013, 2016); French Cup champion (2014); French Cup Final MVP (2014); French All-Star (2014); ABL All-Star (2010)

Trenton "Trent" Meacham (born September 26, 1985) is an American former professional basketball player and current college basketball analyst. He played college basketball at both the University of Dayton and the University of Illinois.

== Professional career ==
In July 2009, he signed with WBC Raiffeisen Wels of Austria for the 2009–10 season. In July 2010, he signed with BG Göttingen of Germany for the 2010–11 season.

In June 2011, he signed with Paris-Levallois of France for the 2011–12 season.

In October 2012, he signed with JSF Nanterre of France for the rest of the 2012–13 season. In June 2013, he re-signed with JSF Nanterre for one more year.

In August 2014, he signed a one-year deal with the Italian team Emporio Armani Milano. In February 2015, he left Milano and signed with ASVEL Basket of France. In March 2017, he left ASVEL.

On October 22, 2017, he signed with French club Boulazac Basket Dordogne. This was his last season as an active player.

== Post-playing career ==
Meacham has been working as a college basketball analyst for the Big Ten Network and Fox Sports since the 2021-22 season.

== Personal life ==
Meacham is married to Theresa Lisch, a basketball player herself and the sister of his former teammate, Kevin.
