= Heiko Schaffartzik =

German basketball player (born 1984)

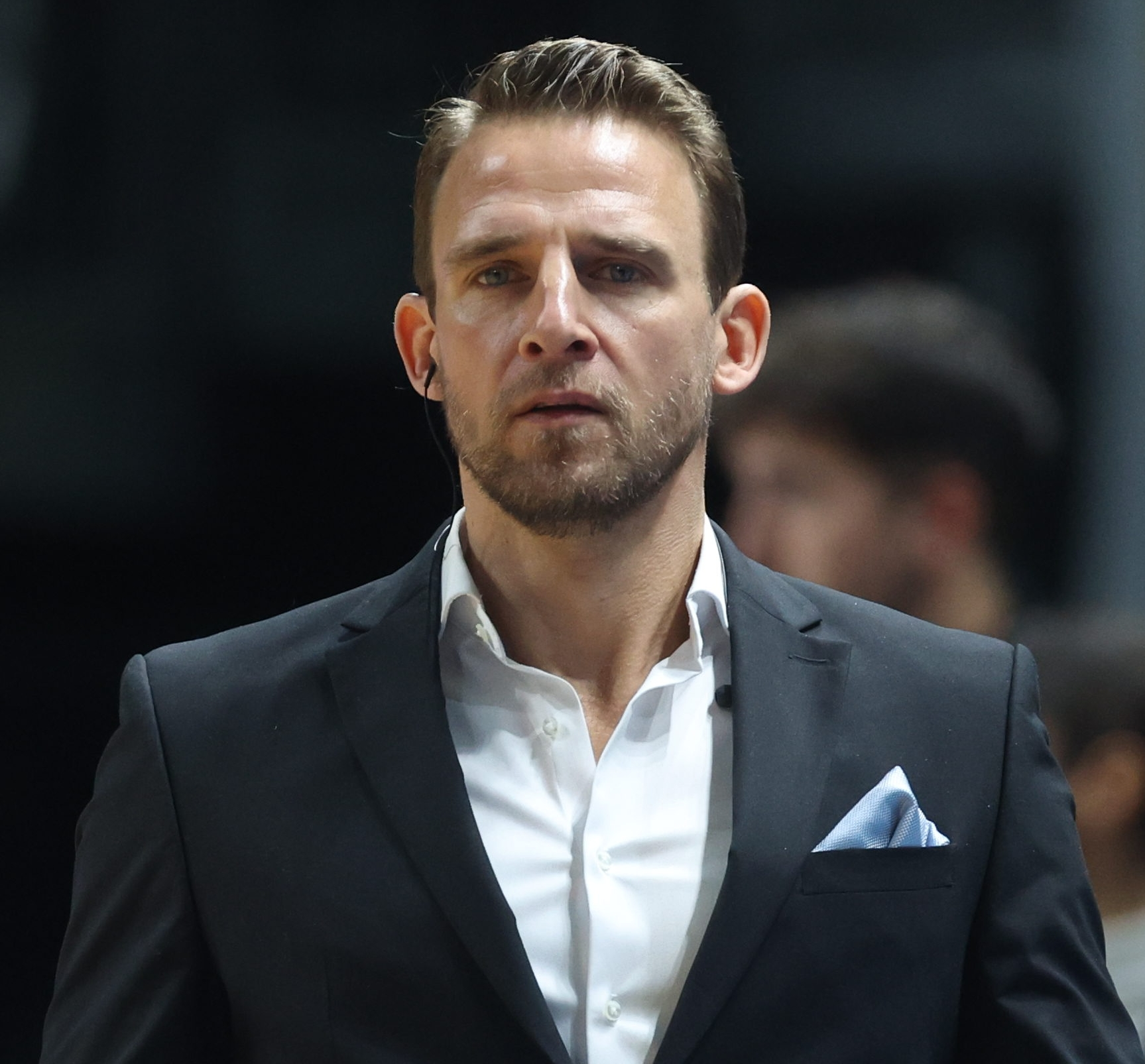
- Schaffartzik in 2024

Personal information
- Born: 3 January 1984 (age 41) Berlin, Germany
- Listed height: 1.83 m (6 ft 0 in)
- Listed weight: 83 kg (183 lb)

Career information
- NBA draft: 2006: undrafted
- Playing career: 2002–2020
- Position: Point guard / shooting guard

Career history
- 2002–2004: Alba Berlin
- 2004–2005: Gießen 64ers
- 2005–2006: Sellbytel Baskets Nürnberg
- 2006–2007: EWE Baskets Oldenburg
- 2007–2008: EnBW Ludwigsburg
- 2008–2009: LTi Gießen 46ers
- 2009–2010: New Yorker Phantoms
- 2010–2011: Türk Telekom
- 2011–2013: Alba Berlin
- 2013–2015: Bayern Munich
- 2015–2016: Limoges CSP
- 2016–2018: Nanterre 92
- 2019–2020: Hamburg Towers

Career highlights
- FIBA Europe Cup champion (2017); French Cup Final MVP (2017); French Cup winner (2017); LNB All-Star (2016); 3× BBL champion (2003, 2004, 2014); 2× BBL-Pokal winner (2003, 2004)

Heiko Schaffartzik (born 3 January 1984) is a German former professional basketball player. Schaffartzik was also a member of the Germany national basketball team.

== Professional career ==
In 2011 Schaffartzik signed a contract with Alba Berlin. In the 2012–13 season, he played his first season in the Euroleague, he averaged 6.2 points per game in the competition.

On August 1, 2013, Schaffartzik signed a two-year contract with Bayern Munich. In the 2013–14, he won the Basketball Bundesliga with Bayern, after his team beat Alba 3–1 in the Finals.

On September 28, 2015, Limoges CSP announced it had signed Schaffartzik.

In June 2016, Schaffartzik signed a one-year contract with Nanterre 92. On April 22, 2017, Schaffartzik won the French Cup after beating Le Mans Sarthe Basket 79–96 in the Final. He was named the French Basketball Cup Final MVP after scoring 24 points in the Final. On April 25, Schaffartzik won the FIBA Europe Cup with Nanterre, as the team beat Élan Chalon on aggregate over two legs.

On June 12, 2017, Schaffartzik re-signed with Nanterre 92 for one more season.

On July 2, 2018, Schaffartzik signed a one-year contract with Tecnyconta Zaragoza. On August 10, 2018, Schaffartzik parted ways with Tecnyconta Zaragoza after the injury suffered in the right knee in a pre-season training and whose recovery did not allow him to play at the beginning of the season.

On September 16, 2019, he has signed with Hamburg Towers of the German Basketball Bundesliga.

== German national team ==
Schaffartzik has also been a member of the senior German national basketball team. Schaffartzik played at the EuroBasket 2009, EuroBasket 2011, EuroBasket 2013 and EuroBasket 2015. He also played at the 2010 FIBA World Championship.

=== Statistics ===
Tournaments with Germany
Year	Pos.	PPG	RPG	APG
EuroBasket
2009	11	12.7	2.0	3.8
2011	9	10.6	3.3	3.9
2013	17	13.4	3.2	6.8
2015	18	3.8	2.0	3.0
FIBA Basketball World Cup
2010	17	9.4	2.4	2.8
Source: FIBA.com

== Personal ==
Schaffartzik was cured of leukemia when he was a child. He now visits sick children every year with his team in the hospital where he was treated.

== Honours ==
Alba Berlin

- Basketball Bundesliga (2): 2002–03, 2003–04
- BBL-Pokal (2): 2003, 2004

Bayern Munich

- Basketball Bundesliga (1): 2013–14

== Career statistics ==
Legend
GP	Games played	GS	Games started	MPG	Minutes per game
FG%	Field-goal percentage	3P%	3-point field-goal percentage	FT%	Free-throw percentage
RPG	Rebounds per game	APG	Assists per game	SPG	Steals per game
BPG	Blocks per game	PPG	Points per game	PIR	Performance index rating
**Bold**	Career high

=== Euroleague ===
Year	Team	GP	GS	MPG	FG%	3P%	FT%	RPG	APG	SPG	BPG	PPG	PIR
2012–13	Alba Berlin	21	1	20.7	.339	.341	**.917**	.9	2.6	.1	.0	6.2	5.2
2013–14	Bayern Munich	**22**	1	20.8	.407	.329	.857	1.8	**2.8**	.3	.0	5.9	5.6
2014–15	Bayern Munich	10	**2**	**21.8**	**.509**	**.462**	.824	**2.3**	**2.8**	**.5**	.0	**8.8**	**9.6**
**Career**		53	5	20.9	.399	.360	.873	1.5	2.7	.3	.0	6.6	6.2
