= 2013–14 French Basketball Cup =

French Basketball Cup
- Season: 2013–14
- Duration: October 23, 2013 – May 11, 2014
- Games played: 56

Finals
- Champions: JSF Nanterre (1st title)
- Runners-up: SLUC Nancy

Awards
- Final MVP: (United States) Trenton Meacham

The 2013–14 French Basketball Cup season was the 37th season of the domestic cup competition of French basketball. The defending champions were Paris-Levallois Basket. JSF Nanterre won the Cup after it beat SLUC Nancy 55–50 in the Final. Trenton Meacham was named the French Basketball Cup Final MVP.

== Final ==
May 11, 2014	JSF Nanterre	55–50	SLUC Nancy	Stade Pierre de Coubertin, Paris
18:30	Scoring by quarter: 18–17, 8–9, 11–14, 22–11
	Pts: Thomas, Meacham 12; Rebs: Thomas 12; Asts: Meacham 4	Boxscore	Pts: Falker 14; Rebs: Falker 10; Asts: Harris 3	Attendance: 4,500; Referees: N. Maestre, R. Bardera, D. Chambon

Nanterre	Nancy

MVP (United States) Trenton Meacham Game rules Game was played under FIBA rules. Arena Halle Georges Carpentier 2014 French Cup Winners JSF Nanterre (1st title)
