= 2014 Match des Champions =

JSF Nanterre	Limoges CSP
70	54
	1	2	3	4	Total
JSF Nanterre	14	19	19	18	70
Limoges CSP	12	10	14	18	54
- Date: September 23, 2014
- Venue: Kindarena, Rouen
- MVP: (United States) Kyle Weems

The 2014 Match des Champions was the 9th edition of the annual super cup game in French basketball. This year the reigning LNB Pro A champions Limoges CSP faced off against French Cup champions JSF Nanterre. The game was played in the Kindarena in Rouen.

Nanterre won the game 54–70 and Kyle Weems was named Most Valuable Player of the 2015 Match.

== Match ==
September 23, 2014
21:00

Boxscore

Limoges CSP	54–70	JSF Nanterre
Scoring by quarter: 12–14, 22–33, 36–52, 54–70
Pts: Smith 13; Rebs: Moerman 7 Asts: Moerman 4		Pts: Weems 13; Rebs: Jaiteh 10; Asts: 2 players 3

Kindarena, Rouen
Referees:
- Hosselet
- Difallah
- Milliot

Limoges	Nanterre

Starters:			Pts	Reb	Ast
PG	9	(France) Léo Westermann			
SG	5	(United States) Jamar Smith			
SF	16	(France) Nobel Boungou Colo			
PF	18	(France) Adrien Moerman			
C	13	(Brazil) J.P. Batista			
Reserves:
F	12	(France) Ousmane Camara			
F	10	(France) Lamine Kante			
C	14	(Burkina Faso) Frejus Zerbo			
F	17	(Ivory Coast) Pape-Philippe Amagou			
G	25	(United States) Ramel Curry			
PF	44	(United States) Trent Plaisted			
Head coach:
(France) Jean-Marc Dupraz

MVP
(United States) Kyle Weems
Game rules
Game was played under FIBA rules.

2014 Match des Champions Winners
JSF Nanterre
(1st title)

Starters:			Pts	Reb	Ast
PG	11	(United States) Jamal Shuler			
SG	8	(Cameroon) Jérémy Nzeulie			
SF	10	(United States) Mykal Riley			
PF	34	(United States) Kyle Weems			
C	14	(France) Mouhammadou Jaiteh			
Reserves:
PG	3	(Bulgaria) Keydren Clark			
G	5	(France) Marc Judith			
PG	7	(France) Joseph Gomis			
F	13	(France) Johan Passave-Ducteil			
PF	21	(United Kingdom) Laurence Ekperigin			
Head coach:
(France) Pascal Donnadieu
