= Zeb Cope =

American basketball player

Personal information
- Born: February 17, 1982 (age 44) Fort Hood, Texas
- Listed height: 6 ft 8 in (2.03 m)
- Listed weight: 240 lb (109 kg)

Career information
- High school: Columbia (Columbia, South Carolina)
- College: William & Mary (2000–2004)
- NBA draft: 2004: undrafted
- Playing career: 2004–2010
- Position: Power forward

Career history
- 2004: Calpe (Spain)
- 2004–2006: BC Boncourt Red Team (Switzerland)
- 2006–2007: Fribourg Olympic (Switzerland)
- 2007–2008: Orléans Loiret (France)
- 2008–2009: JDA Dijon (France)
- 2009–2010: JSF Nanterre (France)

Career highlights
- 2× Swiss League MVP (2005, 2006); 2× Swiss League champion (2005, 2006)

Zebulun Shomari "Zeb" Cope (born February 17, 1982) is a retired American professional basketball player. He played for six seasons in leagues in Spain, Switzerland, and France. Cope was a two-time Swiss League champion and as its most valuable player twice.

Cope played college basketball at the College of William & Mary from 2000–01 through 2003–04. In his final three seasons he played alongside Adam Hess, a guard who went on to have a long and successful professional career as well.

As of 2015, he graduated from Lake Erie College of Osteopathic Medicine earning his medical degree as a Doctor of Osteopathic Medicine (D.O.) and is an Obstetrics & Gynecology resident physician at Grand Rapids Medical Education Partners/Michigan State University College of Human Medicine.
