= 2018–19 Pro A season =

2018–19 Pro A
- Season: 2018–19
- Dates: 21 September 2018 – 25 June 2019
- Games played: 326
- Teams: 18

Regular season
- Top seed: LDLC ASVEL
- Basketball Champions League: JDA Dijon; Élan Béarnais; SIG Strasbourg
- Season MVP: (United States) David Holston
- Relegated: Provence; Antibes Sharks

Finals
- Champions: LDLC ASVEL (19th title)
- Runners-up: Monaco
- Semi-finalists: JDA Dijon; Nanterre 92

Statistical leaders
Points	(United States) Devin Ebanks	18.8
Rebounds	(Senegal) Youssou Ndoye	8.8
Assists	(United States) Justin Robinson	8.2
Index Rating	(United States) Julian Wright	19.4

The 2018–19 Pro A season, for sponsorships reasons the Jeep Élite, was the 97th season of the Pro A, the top basketball league in France organised by the Ligue Nationale de Basket (LNB). It was the second season with Jeep as main sponsor. The season started on 21 September 2018 with the regular season and ended on 25 June 2019 with the last game of the finals.

LDLC ASVEL won its nineteenth French championship and its first one since 2016. In the finals, they defeated Monaco.

== Teams ==
Location of teams in the 2018–19 Pro A season

=== Promotion and relegation ===
Hyères-Toulon and Boulazac Basket Dordogne were relegated after the 2017–18 season after the teams ended in the last two places.

Blois promoted by finishing first in the regular season with a 27–7 record in the Pro B. Fos Provence made its Pro A debut after promoting, as Fos defeated Roanne in the finals of the promotion play-offs.

However, as ADA Blois did not meet the requirements for playing in Pro A, Boulazac remained in the league.

=== Locations and arenas ===
Team	Home city	Stadium	Capacity
Antibes Sharks	Antibes	Azur Arena Antibes	5,249
AS Monaco	Fontvieille, Monaco	Salle Gaston Médecin	3,700
ASVEL	Lyon–Villeurbanne	Astroballe	5,556
BCM Gravelines-Dunkerque	Gravelines	Sportica	3,500
Boulazac Dordogne	Boulazac	Le Palio	5,200
Champagne Châlons Reims	Reims	Complexe René-Tys	3,000
Cholet	Cholet	La Meilleraie	5,191
Élan Béarnais Pau-Lacq-Orthez	Pau	Palais des Sports de Pau	7,707
Élan Chalon	Chalon-sur-Saône	Le Colisée	5,000
ESSM Le Portel	Le Portel	Le Chaudron	3,500
Fos Provence	Fos-sur-mer	Parsemain Sports Complex	2,000
JDA Dijon	Dijon	Palais des Sports de Dijon	5,000
JL Bourg	Bourg-en-Bresse	Ekinox	3,548
Le Mans Sarthe	Le Mans	Antarès	6,003
Levallois Metropolitans	Levallois	Palais des Sports Marcel Cerdan	4,000
Limoges CSP	Limoges	Beaublanc	6,000
Nanterre 92	Nanterre	Palais des Sports de Nanterre	3,000
SIG Strasbourg	Strasbourg	Rhénus Sport	6,200

=== Personnel and sponsorship ===
Team	Head coach	Kit manufacturer	Shirt sponsor
Antibes Sharks	(Serbia) Nikola Antić	Spalding	Mutuelles du Soleil
AS Monaco	(Serbia) Saša Obradović	Erreà	-
ASVEL	(Montenegro) Zvezdan Mitrović	Peak	LDLC
BCM Gravelines-Dunkerque	(France) Julien Mahé	BIG Sports	Caisse d'Épargne
Boulazac Basket Dordogne	(France) Thomas Andrieux	Kappa	E.Leclerc
Champagne Châlons Reims	(Serbia) Nikola Antić	Kappa	E.Leclerc
Cholet	(Turkey) Erman Kunter	Spalding	Système U
Élan Béarnais Pau-Lacq-Orthez	(France) Laurent Vila	Peak	DPD
Élan Chalon	(France) Jean-Denys Choulet	BIG Sports	Joker
ESSM Le Portel	(France) Éric Girard	Kappa	Intersport
Fos Provence	(France) Rémi Giuitta	Vive	Eiffage Construction
JDA Dijon	(France) Laurent Legname	Erreà	Groupe Iserba
JL Bourg	(France) Savo Vučević	Spalding	Charles Réma
Le Mans Sarthe	(France) Alexandre Ménard	Kappa	Fermier de Loué
Levallois Metropolitans	(France) Frédéric Fauthoux	Li-Ning	IDEX
Limoges CSP	(France) Kyle Milling	BIG Sports	Intermarché
Nanterre 92	(France) Pascal Donnadieu	Nike	GTM Bâtiment
SIG Strasbourg	(France) Vincent Collet	Adidas	Suez

=== Managerial changes ===
Team	Outgoing manager	Manner of departure	Date of vacancy	Position in table	Replaced with	Date of appointment
ASVEL	(France) Terence Parker	End of contract	1 June 2018	Pre-season	(Montenegro) Zvezdan Mitrović	26 June 2018
AS Monaco	(Montenegro) Zvezdan Mitrović	Signed with ASVEL	26 June 2018	Pre-season	(Slovenia) Sašo Filipovski	28 June 2018
AS Monaco	(Slovenia) Sašo Filipovski	Fired	1 February 2019	During Season	(Serbia) Saša Obradović	1 February 2019

=== Budgets ===
On 3 October 2018, the LNB published the budgets and salary expenditures of the Pro A clubs.

Club	Budget (in €)	Salary expenditures
AS Monaco	8,089,000	2,995,000
SIG Strasbourg	7,705,000	2,494,000
Le Mans Sarthe Basket	6,589,000	2,010,000
Limoges CSP	7,029,000	2,189,000
JDA Dijon	4,488,000	1,300,000
ASVEL Lyon-Villeurbanne	9,158,000	2,949,000
Nanterre 92	4,877,000	1,617,000
Élan Béarnais Pau-Lacq-Orthez	5,161,000	1,353,000
JL Bourg	5,123,000	1,547,000
Levallois Metropolitans	5,125,000	1,641,000
ESSM Le Portel	3,546,000	1,219,000
Élan Chalon	5,163,000	1,538,500
BCM Gravelines-Dunkerque	5,837,000	1,833,000
Champagne Châlons Reims Basket	4,129,000	1,395,000
Cholet Basket	4,111,000	1,184,500
Olympique d'Antibes	3,410,000	1,017,000
Boulazac Basket Dordogne	3,483,000	1,267,000
Provence Basket	3,179,000	1,105,500
Average	5,342,000	1,704,000

== Regular season ==
=== League table ===
Pos	Team	Pld	W	L	PF	PA	PD	Qualification or relegation
1	LDLC ASVEL	34	27	7	2859	2602	+257	Qualification for playoffs
2	Monaco	34	24	10	2834	2586	+248	Qualification for playoffs
3	JDA Dijon	34	23	11	2761	2546	+215	Qualification for playoffs
4	Nanterre 92	34	23	11	2870	2684	+186	Qualification for playoffs
5	ÉB Pau-Lacq-Orthez	34	21	13	2692	2614	+78	Qualification for playoffs
6	SIG Strasbourg	34	20	14	2765	2709	+56	Qualification for playoffs
7	Limoges CSP	34	20	14	2865	2778	+87	Qualification for playoffs
8	Le Mans Sarthe	34	20	14	2782	2637	+145	Qualification for playoffs
9	JL Bourg	34	19	15	2793	2778	+15	
10	Boulazac Basket Dordogne	34	17	17	2708	2700	+8	
11	BCM Gravelines	34	16	18	2775	2815	−40	
12	Levallois Metropolitans	34	14	20	2692	2759	−67	
13	Champagne Châlons Reims	34	13	21	2814	2931	−117	
14	Élan Chalon	34	12	22	2902	2869	+33	
15	Cholet	34	11	23	2669	2882	−213	
16	ESSM Le Portel	34	10	24	2647	2889	−242	
17	Fos Provence Basket (R)	34	9	25	2591	2913	−322	Relegation to Pro B
18	Antibes Sharks (R)	34	7	27	2521	2848	−327	Relegation to Pro B

Source: LNB.fr
Rules for classification: 1) points; 2) Head-to-head; 3) Points difference; 4) Points scored.
(R) Relegated

=== Results ===
Home \ Away	ANT	ASV	BCM	BOU	CHA	CHO	PAU	ELA	FOS	POR	DIJ	JLB	LMS	LEV	LIM	MON	NAN	STR
Antibes Sharks	—	72–87	66–78	79–91	78–86	72–69	83–73	63–100	72–76	78–63	71–84	76–71	78–92	62–67	85–92	60–83	70–86	81–86
LDLC ASVEL	91–60	—	95–72	77–61	91–84	68–76	88–75	106–104	88–64	91–73	80–62	81–66	80–76	81–75	82–68	92–91	74–96	85–61
BCM Gravelines	88–71	84–96	—	69–77	85–81	87–83	52–80	66–91	116–85	86–71	70–86	65–78	69–76	97–85	88–83	74–65	84–80	78–87
Boulazac Dordogne	85–84	73–78	72–65	—	98–86	117–92	90–77	80–75	81–52	82–57	73–84	86–82	69–74	72–75	70–96	77–61	83–78	62–79
Champagne Châlons Reims	91–80	73–82	88–78	83–81	—	94–79	78–82	91–87	81–80	82–70	81–89	96–102	77–91	102–98	83–106	86–93	77–102	93–91
Cholet	74–91	76–87	84–71	77–92	75–85	—	63–70	98–94	99–83	81–79	61–67	89–82	70–64	69–96	76–84	82–87	98–92	75–112
ÉB Pau-Lacq-Orthez	73–72	82–79	82–73	97–95	77–67	70–79	—	101–96	84–77	92–69	63–59	74–85	91–90	84–69	84–69	68–70	84–75	98–57
Élan Chalon	92–70	89–92	100–102	97–65	66–98	89–84	78–82	—	88–74	92–70	81–89	76–79	85–74	90–79	73–77	79–78	94–97	77–92
Fos Provence Basket	80–87	62–85	62–88	88–76	84–73	70–77	90–91	76–73	—	67–79	61–82	78–76	68–88	64–72	87–72	80–77	73–95	74–82
ESSM Le Portel	98–87	69–72	82–87	70–72	83–81	84–92	75–69	82–85	85–83	—	90–69	86–92	76–90	83–78	90–81	83–82	82–105	82–79
JDA Dijon	84–55	94–77	82–84	83–66	87–65	76–72	81–78	80–72	112–85	94–58	—	73–76	78–70	79–75	109–87	81–84	87–81	80–55
JL Bourg	82–57	81–82	85–100	93–75	102–83	95–86	72–64	93–84	75–93	89–84	90–88	—	83–77	78–80	88–99	100–90	75–70	83–73
Le Mans Sarthe	98–89	89–83	89–87	86–78	89–74	83–77	94–74	88–74	100–84	102–82	81–57	79–61	—	80–69	60–68	76–64	75–84	71–75
Levallois Metropolitans	86–92	79–88	86–83	66–69	83–78	74–59	68–66	68–81	81–90	84–74	80–89	85–96	85–74	—	98–90	79–80	85–92	80–65
Limoges CSP	86–63	74–85	95–99	89–84	88–84	84–76	81–68	111–103	92–87	89–67	67–79	103–74	91–81	106–78	—	73–85	80–62	90–76
Monaco	103–89	63–66	94–74	85–74	83–59	88–67	91–74	93–78	78–69	90–85	89–71	85–74	82–65	87–89	87–68	—	75–63	83–79
Nanterre 92	78–73	79–78	88–82	68–90	73–67	89–70	74–82	81–78	93–71	99–93	77–73	85–64	98–77	90–82	86–65	77–82	—	92–86
SIG Strasbourg	75–55	97–92	90–84	93–88	90–97	96–82	65–70	90–81	107–74	87–73	91–78	76–71	77–75	69–58	81–61	71–101	75–85	—

Source: LNB.fr
Legend: Blue = home team win; Red = away team win.

== Play-offs ==
Quarterfinals were played in a best-of-three games format, while the semifinals and the finals in a best-of-five (2–2–1) format.

=== Bracket ===
Quarterfinals
1	LDLC ASVEL	2
8	Le Mans Sarthe	0
4	Nanterre 92	2
5	ÉB Pau-Lacq-Orthez	1
2	Monaco	2
7	Limoges	0
3	JDA Dijon	2
6	SIG Strasbourg	0

Semifinals
1	LDLC ASVEL	3
4	Nanterre 92	0
2	Monaco	3
3	JDA Dijon	0

Finals
1	LDLC ASVEL	3
2	Monaco	2

=== Quarterfinals ===
Team 1	Series	Team 2	Game 1	Game 2	Game 3
LDLC ASVEL	2–0	Le Mans Sarthe	73–67	70–63	
Monaco	2–0	Limoges	93–73	90–62	
JDA Dijon	2–0	SIG Strasbourg	94–62	89–85	
Nanterre 92	2–1	ÉB Pau-Lacq-Orthez	101–65	64–76	84–69

=== Semifinals ===
Team 1	Series	Team 2	Game 1	Game 2	Game 3	Game 4	Game 5
LDLC ASVEL	3–0	Nanterre 92	91–72	82–70	99–56		
Monaco	3–0	JDA Dijon	82–77	84–75	81–78		

=== Finals ===
Team 1	Series	Team 2	Game 1	Game 2	Game 3	Game 4	Game 5
LDLC ASVEL	3–2	Monaco	81–71	73–67	62–97	81–89	66–55

== French clubs in European competitions ==
Team	Competition	Progress
LDLC ASVEL	EuroCup	Quarterfinals
Limoges	EuroCup	Top 16
Monaco	EuroCup	Top 16
JDA Dijon	Champions League	Regular season
Le Mans Sarthe	Champions League	Round of 16
Nanterre 92	Champions League	Round of 16
SIG Strasbourg	Champions League	Regular season
