= 2017 Match des Champions =

Élan Chalon	Nanterre 92
69	95
- Date: 19 September 2017
- Venue: Vendéspace, Mouilleron-le-Captif
- MVP: (United States) Terran Petteway

The 2017 Match des Champions (English: 2017 Champions Game) was the 12th edition of the Match des Champions. The game was played between Élan Chalon, the winner of the 2016–17 Pro A season, and Nanterre 92, the winner of the 2016–17 French Cup.

Nanterre 92 won the game 95–69 over Élan Chalon and won its second title in club history.

== Match details ==
19 September 2017	Élan Chalon	69–95	Nanterre 92	Mouilleron-le-Captif
20:30	Scoring by quarter: 18–28, 15–30, 24–24, 12–13
	Pts: Camara 20; Rebs: Camara 13; Asts: Nzeulie 8	Boxscore	Pts: Petteway 17; Rebs: Aminu 4 Asts: Shuler 7	Arena: Vendéspace

Chalon	Nanterre

2017 Match des Champions winner
Nanterre 92
(2nd title)
