= 2012–13 Pro A season =

2012–13 LNB Pro A season
- League: (France) LNB Pro A
- Sport: Basketball
- Games: 240 (regular season)
- Teams: 16
- TV partner: Sport+

Regular Season
- Top seed: Gravelines-Dunkerque
- Season MVP: (France) Edwin Jackson (United States) Dwight Buycks
- Top scorer: (United States) Sean May

2012-13 Finals
- Champions: JSF Nanterre
- Runners-up: Strasbourg IG
- Finals MVP: (United States) David Lighty

LNB Pro A seasons
- ← 2011–12 2013–14 →

The 2012–13 LNB Pro A season was the 91st season of the French Basketball Championship and the 26th season since inception of the Ligue Nationale de Basketball (LNB).

The regular season started on October 5, 2012 and ended on April 30, 2013. Playoffs started on May 14 and ended on June 8, 2013. JSF Nanterre won their first title.

== Promotion and relegation ==
At the beginning of the 2012–13 season

Teams promoted from 2011 to 2012 Pro B (French 2nd basketball division)

- Limoges (Champion)
- Boulazac (2nd)

Teams relegated to 2012–13 Pro B

- Pau-Lacq-Orthez (15th)
- Hyères-Toulon (16th)

At the end of the 2012–13 season

- 2012-13 Pro A champion: Nanterre

Teams promoted from 2012 to 2013 Pro B

- Pau-Lacq-Orthez (1st)
- Antibes (Champion)

Teams relegated to 2013–14 Pro B

- Boulazac (15th)
- Poitiers (16th)

== Team arenas ==
Location of teams in Pro A League 2011–12

Team	Home city	Stadium	Capacity
Boulazac Basket Dordogne	Boulazac	Le Palio	5,200
Élan sportif chalonnais	Chalon-sur-Saône	Le Colisée	5,000
Cholet Basket	Cholet	La Meilleraie	5,191
JDA Dijon	Dijon	Palais des Sports Jean-Michel Geoffroy	5,000
BCM Gravelines Dunkerque	Gravelines	Sportica	3,500
STB Le Havre	Le Havre	Salle des Docks Océane	3,598
Le Mans Sarthe Basket	Le Mans	Antarès	6,003
Limoges Cercle Saint-Pierre	Limoges	Beaublanc	6,000
ASVEL Basket	Lyon – Villeurbanne	Astroballe	5,643
SLUC Nancy Basket	Nancy	Palais des Sports Jean Weille	6,027
JSF Nanterre	Nanterre	Palais des Sports de Nanterre	3,000
Orléans Loiret Basket	Orléans	Zénith d'Orléans	5,338
Paris-Levallois Basket	Paris – Levallois	Stade Pierre de Coubertin; Palais des Sports Marcel Cerdan	4,200; 4,000
Poitiers Basket 86	Poitiers	Les Arènes	4,300
Chorale Roanne Basket	Roanne	Halle André Vacheresse	5,020
Strasbourg IG	Strasbourg	Rhénus Sport	6,200

== Regular season ==
Source	lnb.fr – Ranking

#	Teams	P	W	L	PF	PA	Qualification or relegation
1	Gravelines-Dunkerque	30	21	9	2360	2174	Playoffs
2	Strasbourg	30	18	12	2297	2180	Playoffs
3	Lyon-Villeurbanne	30	18	12	2276	2220	Playoffs
4	Chalon-sur-Saône	30	18	10	2291	2192	Playoffs
5	Roanne	30	17	13	2172	2078	Playoffs
6	Le Mans	30	16	14	2202	2200	Playoffs
7	Dijon	30	15	15	2096	2134	Playoffs
8	Nanterre	30	15	15	2352	2361	Playoffs
9	Orléans	30	15	15	2356	2366	
10	Cholet	30	15	15	2268	2275	
11	Le Havre	30	13	17	2303	2314	
12	Paris-Levallois	30	13	17	2350	2399	
13	Limoges	30	13	17	2158	2227	
14	Nancy	30	12	18	2248	2300	
15	Boulazac	30	11	19	2128	2303	Relegation to Pro B
16	Poitiers	30	10	20	2133	2267	Relegation to Pro B

=== Stats leaders ===
Source	lnb.fr – Tops

Statistic	Player	Team	Average
Ranking per Game	(United States) Sean May	Paris-Levallois	21.28
Points per Game	(United States) Sean May	Paris-Levallois	18.41
Rebounds per Game	(United States) Jon Brockman	Limoges	10.65
Assists per Game	(United States) Bernard King	Le Havre	7.36
Steals per Game	(Ivory Coast) Souleymane Diabate	Nancy	2.17
Blocks per Game	(France) Rudy Gobert	Cholet	1.85

== Playoffs ==
Quarter Finals
1	Gravelines-Dunkerque	0
8	Nanterre	2
4	Chalon-sur-Saône	2
5	Roanne	1
2	Strasbourg	2
7	Dijon	0
3	Lyon-Villeurbanne	2
6	Le Mans	1

Semifinals
8	Nanterre	2
4	Chalon-sur-Saône	0
2	Strasbourg	2
3	Lyon-Villeurbanne	0

Finals
8	Nanterre	3
2	Strasbourg	1

== Awards ==
=== LNB awards ===
Source	catch-and-shoot.com

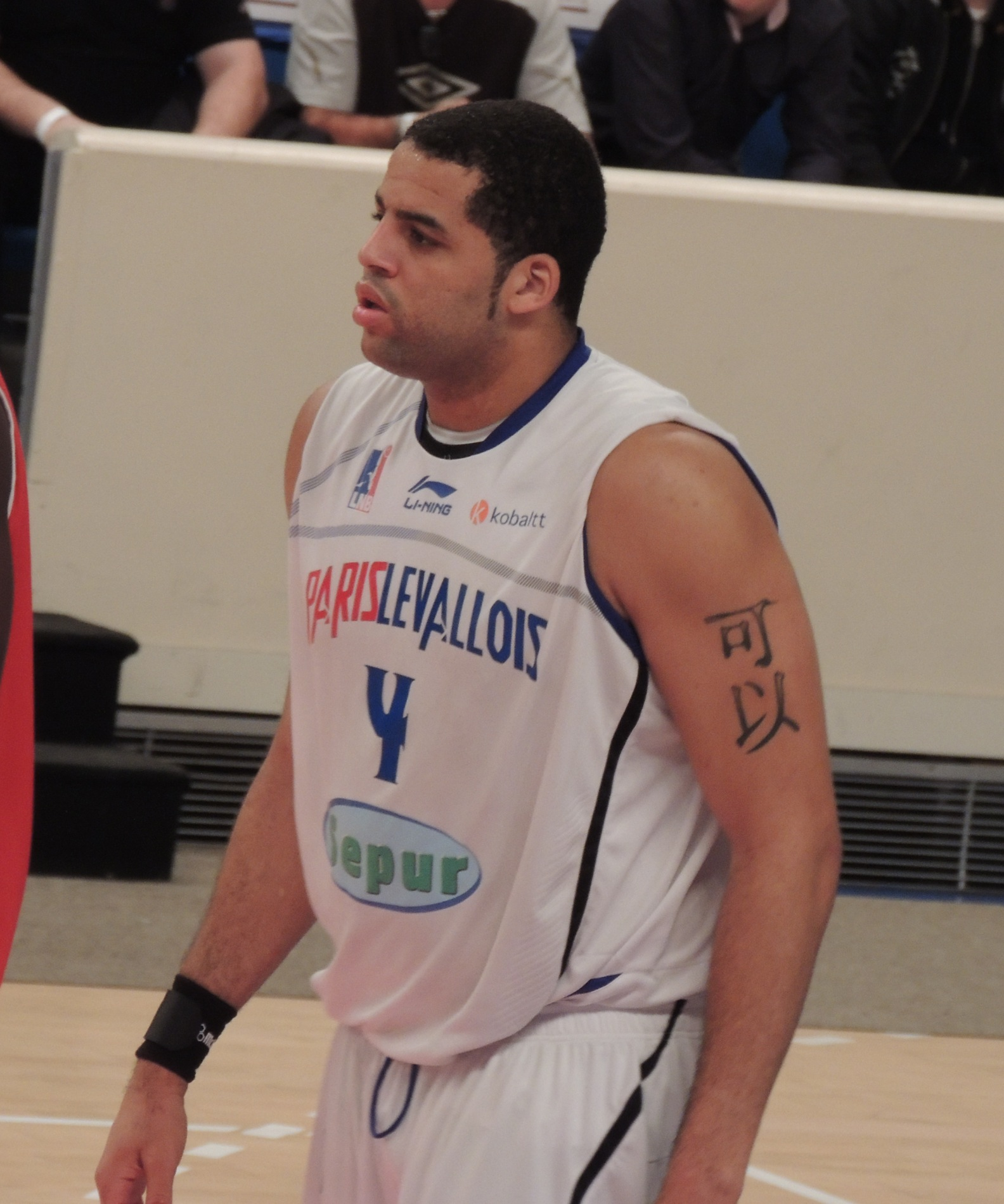
Sean May

Regular Season MVPs

- Foreign MVP : (United States) Dwight Buycks (Gravelines-Dunkerque)
- French MVP : (France) Edwin Jackson (Lyon-Villeurbanne)

Best scorer

- (United States) Sean May (Paris-Levallois)

Rising Star Award

- (France) Livio Jean-Charles (Lyon-Villeurbanne)

Best Defensive Player

- (Italy) Tony Dobbins (Poitiers)

Most Improved Player

- (France) Edwin Jackson (Lyon-Villeurbanne)

Block Leader

- (France) Rudy Gobert (Cholet)

Best Coach

- (France) Christian Monschau (Gravelines-Dunkerque)

=== Finals MVP ===
- (United States) David Lighty (Nanterre)

=== Player of the month ===
Month	Player	Team
October	(Dominican Republic) Ricardo Greer	Strasbourg
November	(United States) Sean May	Paris-Levallois
December	(United States) Dwight Buycks	Gravelines-Dunkerque
January	(United States) Dwight Buycks	Gravelines-Dunkerque
February	(United States) Louis Campbell	Strasbourg
March	(Dominican Republic) Ricardo Greer	Strasbourg
April	(France) Jérémy Leloup	Dijon
