= Halle Georges Carpentier =

Sporting arena in Paris

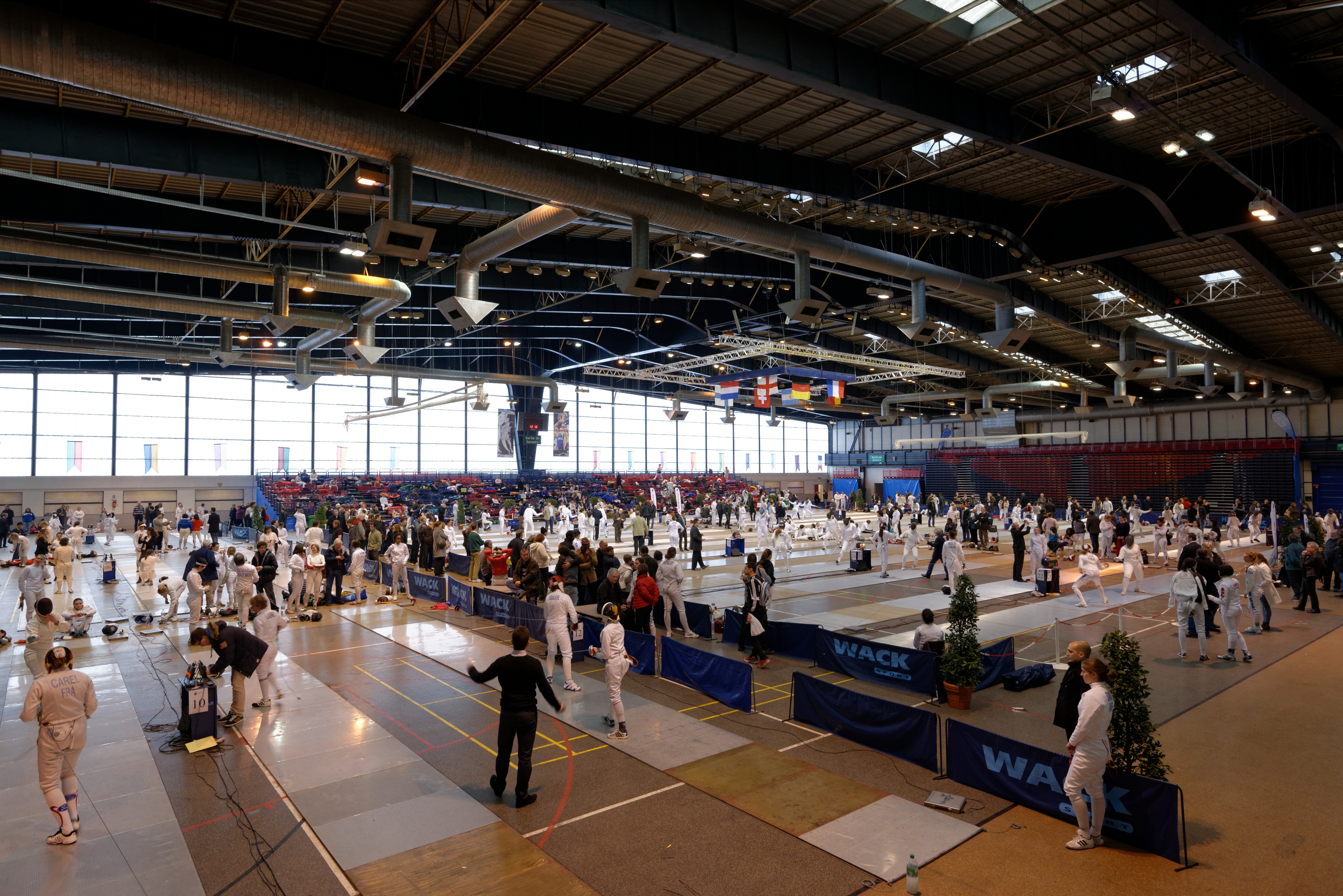
- Interactive map of Halle Georges Carpentier
- Location: Paris, France
- Coordinates: 48°49′12″N 2°22′04″E
- Capacity: Basketball: 5,009
- Surface: Parquet

Construction
- Opened: 1960
- Renovated: 1988
- Architects: Emile Maigrot (original); Jean-Pierre Vidal (renovation)

Tenants
- Paris Basketball (Basketball); Paris Saint-Germain (Handball)

Halle Georges Carpentier (French pronunciation: [al ʒɔʁʒ kaʁpɑ̃tje]) is a multi-use indoor sporting arena that is located in the 13th arrondissement of Paris, France. The arena can be used for multiple sporting events, including: boxing, martial arts, badminton, table tennis, volleyball, handball, fencing, basketball, and gymnastics. It is part of a sports complex that also includes a gym and football, rugby, and athletics facilities. The arena is named after the French boxing legend Georges Carpentier, and it includes a statue of the boxer in the arena's lobby, by the sculptor Brennen.

The seating capacity of the arena when it is configured for basketball games is 5,009.

== History ==
The arena opened in 1960, and was then renovated in 1988. It re-opened after the 1988 renovations on 17 December 1988. The French League basketball club JSF Nanterre has used the arena to host Euroleague games. The French handball club Paris Saint-Germain has also used the arena to host EHF Champions League games.

== Events ==
Among the events that have taken place at the arena are:

- French Badminton Open
- French Volleyball Cup
- French Women's Volleyball Cup
- Georges Marrane International Handball Challenge
- Table Tennis World Cup
- 2010 World Fencing Championships
- 2010 Wheelchair Fencing World Championships
- 2015 World Jump Rope

== See also ==
- List of indoor arenas in France
