= Nanterre 92 =

- Leagues: Pro A Champions League
- Founded: 1927; 99 years ago
- History: JSF Nanterre; 1927–2016; Nanterre 92; 2016–present
- Arena: Palais des Sports (occasional home games in Halle Georges Carpentier)
- Capacity: 3,000
- Location: Nanterre, France
- Team colors: Green, white
- President: Jean Donnadieu
- Head coach: Julien Mahe
- Championships: 1 FIBA Europe Cup; 1 FIBA EuroChallenge; 1 French Championship; 2 French Cup; 2 Match des Champions
- Website: nanterre92.com
Home	Away

Nanterre 92 is a professional basketball club from the city of Nanterre (a western suburb of Paris), France. The club has played in the top-tier level basketball league in France, the Pro A, since 2011. Founded in 1927 as JSF Nanterre, the club plays its home games in the Palais des Sports, which has a capacity of 3,000 people. The honor list of Nanterre includes one French championship and two French Cup titles as well as a FIBA Europe Cup championship.

== History ==
The club was established in 1927 as JSF Nanterre.

Nanterre played in the French 2nd Division, for the first time, in the 2004–05 season. In 2007, the club made it to the finals of the French Cup. In 2011, the club won the French 2nd Division championship, and got promoted to the top national domestic level French League.

In the 2012–13 French League season, after finishing in the eighth position of the regular season, Nanterre won its first top-tier national domestic title, and thus qualified to play in the European-wide top-tier level EuroLeague, in the 2013–14 season.

In the French League 2013–14 season, Nanterre didn't manage to reach the league's playoffs, after finishing 10th in the Pro A regular season. Despite the disappointment in the national league competition, Nanterre won the French Cup title that season. They beat SLUC Nancy Basket, by a score of 55–50, in the Cup's Final. In the French Leaders Cup, Nanterre also reached the Cup Final, but lost to Le Mans Sarthe Basket. Nanterre also made its debut in the EuroLeague that season.

To start the 2014–15 season, Nanterre won the Match des Champions (French Super Cup). On April 26, 2015, Nanterre won its first European-wide trophy. In the 2015, EuroChallenge Final, it beat Trabzsonspor, 63–64, on a buzzer-beater by T.J. Campbell.

In February 2016, the team's name was changed from JSF Nanterre, to Nanterre 92, with "92" representing the numeric code of the club's home department of Hauts-de-Seine.

== Arenas ==
Nanterre 92 plays its home French League national domestic league games, and home EuroCup games, at the 3,000 seat Palais des Sports Maurice Thorez. For home EuroLeague games, when the club played in that competition, in the 2013–14 season, they used the Halle Georges Carpentier, which has a capacity of 5,009 seats for basketball.

On 11 March 2018, Nanterre 92 beat ASVEL Basket, by a score of 81–80, in a French League 2017–18 season game, which was held at the U Arena. The game had an attendance of 15,220, which was the highest attendance of any game in the French League's history.

== Logos ==
The club's JSF Nanterre logo (used until 2016).

The club's Nanterre 92 logo (2016–present).

== Season by season ==
Season	Tier	League	Pos.	French Cup	Leaders Cup	European competitions	
2006–07	2	Pro B	5th	Runner-up			
2007–08	2	Pro B	7th	Semifinalist			
2008–09	2	Pro B	9th	Round of 32			
2009–10	2	Pro B	6th	Round of 16			
2010–11	2	Pro B	1st	Round of 32			
2011–12	1	Pro A	11th	Round of 16			
2012–13	1	Pro A	1st	Runner-up			
2013–14	1	Pro A	10th	Champion	Runner-up	1 Euroleague	RS
2013–14	1	Pro A	10th	Champion	Runner-up	2 Eurocup	EF
2014–15	1	Pro A	5th			3 EuroChallenge	C
2015–16	1	Pro A	8th	Semifinalist	Quarterfinalist	2 Eurocup	RS
2016–17	1	Pro A	6th	Champion	Semifinalist	FIBA Europe Cup	C
2017–18	1	Pro A	7th	Semifinalist	Semifinalist	Champions League	R16
2018–19	1	Pro A	4th	Quarterfinalist		Champions League	QF
2019–20 (Note: The 2019–20 season was canceleld prematurely because of the COVID-19 pandemic.)	1	Pro A	7th	Round of 16		2 EuroCup	RS
2020–21	1	Pro A	10th	Round of 16		2 EuroCup	R16
2021–22	1	Pro A	10th				
2022–23	1	Pro A	13th	Round of 32			
2023–24	1	Pro A	5th	Quarterfinalist	Runner-up		
2024–25	1	Pro A	13th	Round of 16		Champions League	QF

== Trophies ==
=== Domestic ===
French League

- Champion (1): 2012–13

French Cup

- Winners (2): 2013–14, 2016–17
- Runners-up: 2006–07, 2012–13

French Super Cup

- Winners (2): 2014, 2017
- Runners-up (1): 2013

French League 2

- Champion (1): 2010–11

=== European ===
FIBA Europe Cup

- Champion (1): 2016–17

FIBA EuroChallenge

- Champion (1): 2014–15

== Players ==
=== Current roster ===
Note: Flags indicate national team eligibility at FIBA-sanctioned events. Players may hold other non-FIBA nationalities not displayed.

Nanterre 92 roster
Players
Coaches

Pos.	No.	Nat.	Name	Ht.	Wt.	Age
PG	0	(Germany)	Schoormann, Len	1.93 m (6 ft 4 in)	83 kg (183 lb)	24 – 25 July 2002
F	1	(France)	Yimga-Moukouri, Hugo	2.03 m (6 ft 8 in)	99 kg (218 lb)	18 – 3 July 2008
F	3	(United States)	Roberts, J'Wan	2.03 m (6 ft 8 in)	107 kg (236 lb)	25 – 19 September 2001
G/F	6	(France)	Lacombe, Paul	1.95 m (6 ft 5 in)	79 kg (174 lb)	36 – 12 June 1990
PG	8	(France)	Sene, Benjamin	1.88 m (6 ft 2 in)	82 kg (181 lb)	32 – 13 May 1994
F/C	11	(United States)	Saxen, Mitchell	2.08 m (6 ft 10 in)	110 kg (243 lb)	25 – 5 September 2001
G	13	(United States) (Bosnia and Herzegovina)	Castañeda, Xavier	1.84 m (6 ft 0 in)		26 – 26 March 2000
SF	22	(France)	Dussoulier, Lucas	2.06 m (6 ft 9 in)	95 kg (209 lb)	30 – 27 July 1996
F	24	(United States)	Scott, Donta	2.03 m (6 ft 8 in)	104 kg (229 lb)	25 – 4 December 2000
F	99	(United States)	McGlockton, Devin	2.01 m (6 ft 7 in)	104 kg (229 lb)	23 – 27 March 2003

Head coach

- (France) Julien Mahé

Assistant coach(es)

- (France) Karim Remil
- (France) Guillaume Pons

Athletic trainer(s)

- (France) Vincent Dziagwa

Legend

- (C) Team captain
- Injured

- Roster
Updated: September 20, 2026

=== Notable players ===
Note: Flags indicate national team eligibility at FIBA-sanctioned events. Players may hold other non-FIBA nationalities not displayed.

Criteria

To appear in this section a player must have either:

- Set a club record or won an individual award while at the club
- Played at least one official international match for their national team at any time
- Played at least one official NBA match at any time.

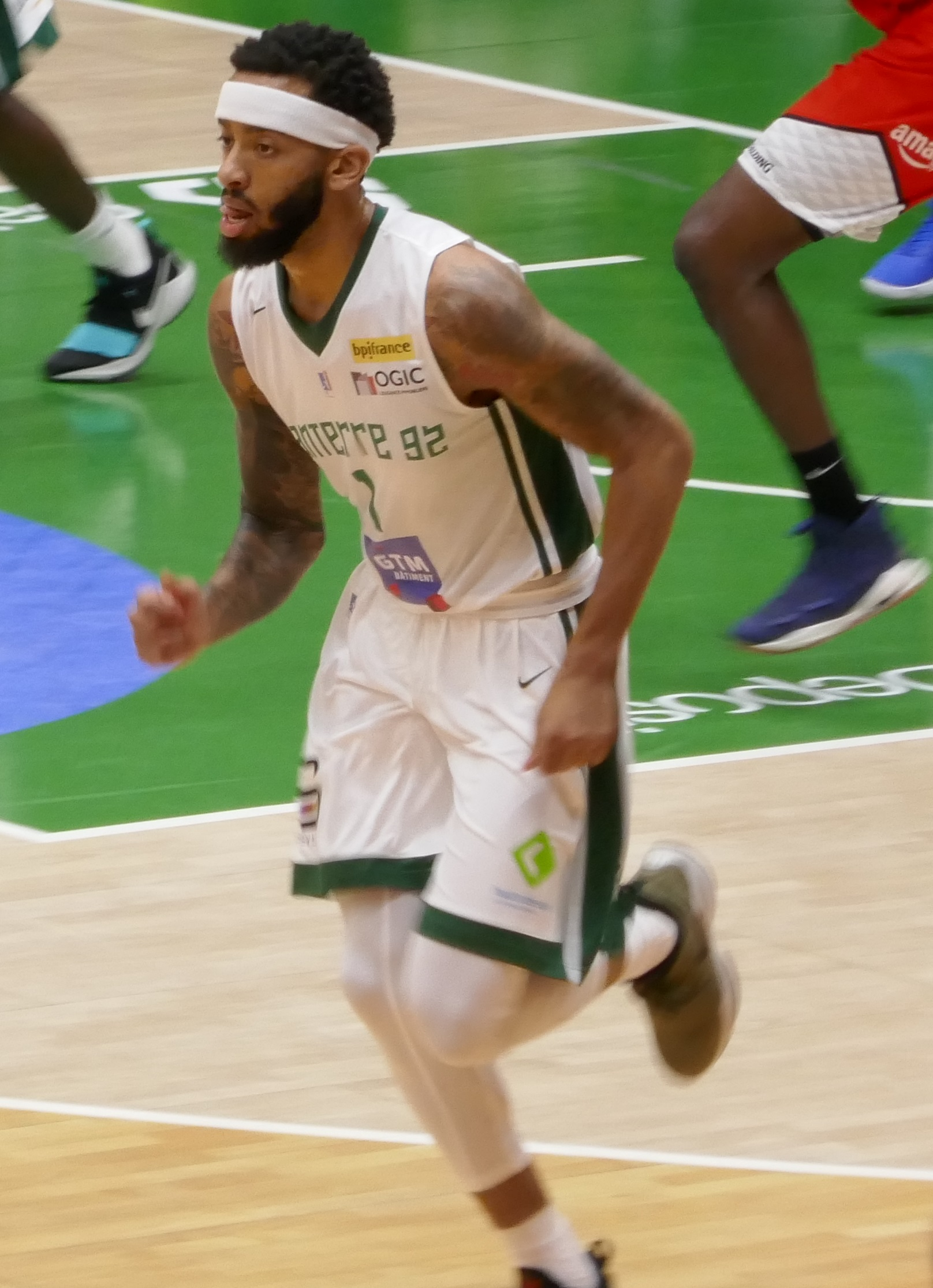
Terran Petteway

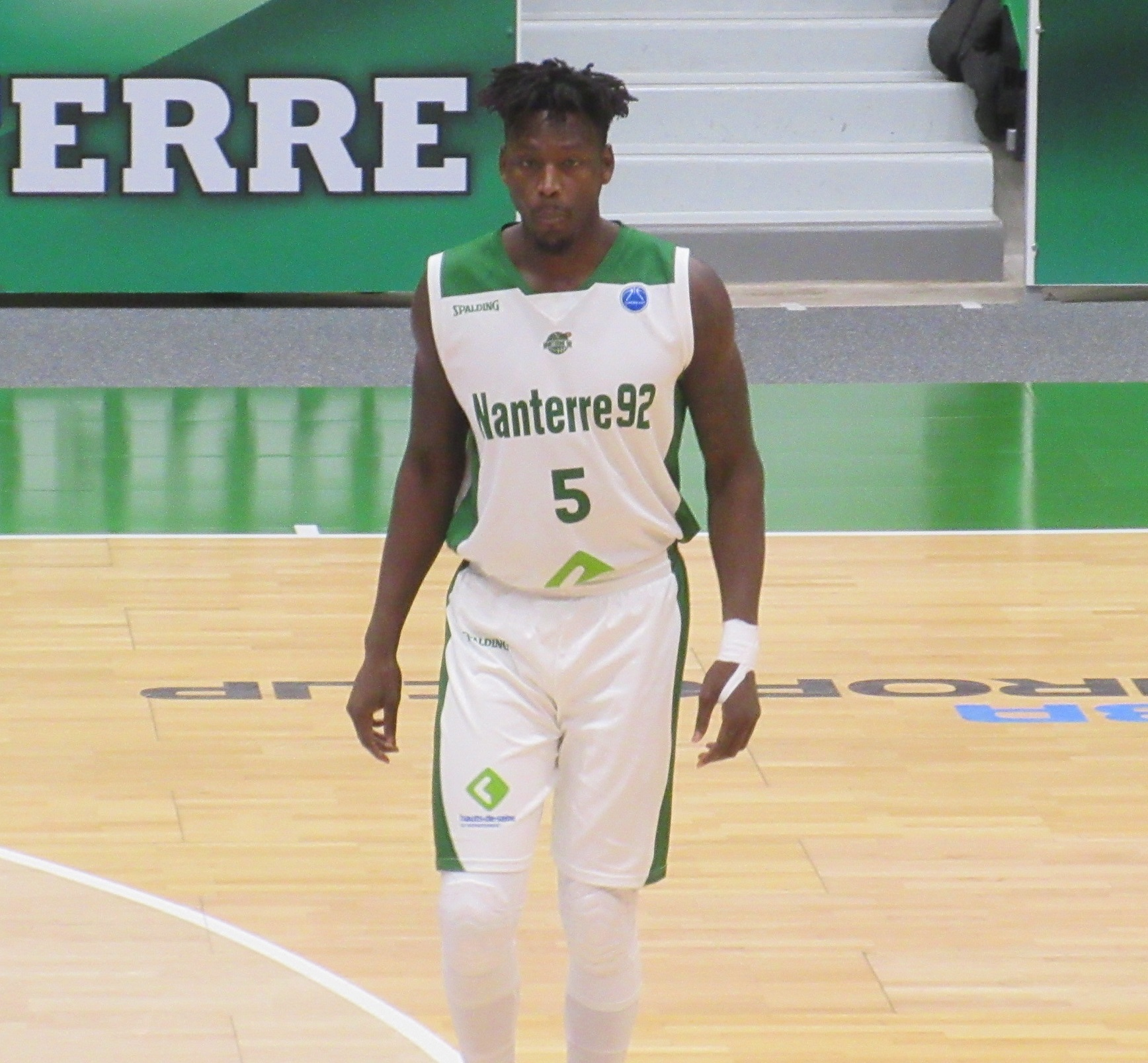
Talib Zanna

- (France) Juhann Bégarin
- (France) Alexandre Chassang
- (France) Souarata Cissé
- (France) Isaia Cordinier
- (France) Mamoutou Diarra
- (France) Mathis Dossou-Yovo
- (France) Evan Fournier
- (France) Joseph Gomis
- (France) William Howard
- (France) Hugo Invernizzi
- (France) Edwin Jackson
- (France) Mouhammadou Jaiteh
- (France) Marc Judith
- (France) Alpha Kaba
- (France) Lahaou Konaté
- (France) Mathias Lessort
- (France) Adrien Moerman
- (France) Adam Mokoka
- (France) Johan Passave-Ducteil
- (France) Ali Traoré
- (France) Victor Wembanyama
- (Albania) Dallas Moore
- (Argentina) Patricio Garino
- (Armenia) Luke Fischer
- (Australia) Brock Motum
- (Australia) Kevin Lisch
- (Belgium) Ajay Mitchell
- (Belgium) Hans Vanwijn
- (Bosnia and Herzegovina) Miralem Halilović
- (Canada) Johnny Berhanemeskel
- (Canada) Kenny Chery
- (Canada) Justin Edwards
- (Republic of the Congo) Loic Akono
- (Cameroon) Joachim Ekanga-Ehawa
- (Cameroon) Jeremy Nzeulie
- (Colombia) Juan Palacios
- (Croatia) Roko Prkačin
- (Dominican Republic) Ivan Almonte
- (Finland) Erik Murphy
- (Finland) Jamar Wilson
- (United Kingdom) Zeb Cope
- (United Kingdom) Laurence Ekperigin
- (United Kingdom) Myles Hesson
- (Germany) Heiko Schaffartzik
- (Iceland) Haukur Palsson
- (Lithuania) Adas Juškevičius
- (Nigeria) Alade Aminu
- (Nigeria) Talib Zanna
- (Portugal) Miguel Cardoso
- (Puerto Rico) Zakai Zeigler
- (Senegal) Malick Badiane
- (Senegal) Ibrahima Fall Faye
- (Senegal) Hamady Ndiaye
- (Senegal) Youssou Ndoye
- (Serbia) Nikola Rebić
- (Sweden) Mats Levin
- (Ukraine) Vyacheslav Bobrov
- (Ukraine) Sergiy Gladyr
- (United States) Steffon Bradford
- (United States) Justin Bibbins
- (United States) Spencer Butterfield
- (United States) Dwight Buycks
- (United States) T.J. Campbell
- (United States) Brian Conklin
- (United States) Rashaun Freeman
- (United States) Julian Gamble
- (United States) Diante Garrett
- (United States) Keith Hornsby
- (United States) Chris Horton
- (United States) Frank Jackson
- (United States) Nick Johnson
- (United States) Kevin Jones
- (United States) David Lighty
- (United States) Deshaun Thomas
- (United States) Ray McCallum
- (United States) Ivan McFarlin
- (United States) Trent Meacham
- (United States) J.J. O'Brien
- (United States) Marcquise Reed
- (United States) Mykal Riley
- (United States) Gerald Robinson
- (United States) Desi Rodriguez
- (United States) Jeremy Senglin
- (United States) Jamal Shuler
- (United States) Taylor Smith
- (United States) Chris Warren
- (United States) Dominic Waters
- (United States) Kyle Weems

== Head coaches ==
- (France) Pascal Donnadieu (1987–2024)
- (Portugal) Philippe da Silva (2024–2025)
- (France) Julien Mahé (2025-current)
