= 2015–16 Pro A season =

2015–16 Pro A
- Season: 2015–16
- Duration: October 3, 2015 – June 11, 2016
- Games played: 306
- Teams: 18

Regular season
- Top seed: Monaco
- Season MVP: (United States) Devin Booker
- Relegated: Rouen Métropole; STB Le Havre

Finals
- Champions: ASVEL (18th title)
- Runners-up: Strasbourg IG
- Finals MVP: (United States) Casper Ware

Statistical leaders
Points	(United States) Michael Thompson	17.8
Rebounds	(Benin) Mouphtaou Yarou	10.8
Assists	(Ivory Coast) Souleyman Diabate	6.5
Index Rating	(United States) Devin Booker	20.0

The 2015–16 LNB Pro A season was the 94th season of the LNB Pro A. The season started on October 3, 2015, and ended June 14, 2016.

Monaco and Antibes Sharks were newcomers this season. Limoges CSP was the defending champion. ASVEL took the title, after beating Strasbourg IG 3–2 in the Finals.

== Teams ==
=== Promotion and relegation ===
Bourg-en-Bresse and Boulogne-sur-Mer were relegated after the two teams finished in 17th and 18th place last season. Monaco was promoted after they won the 2014–15 Pro B, and Antibes Sharks were promoted as the Pro B Playoffs winners.

=== 2015–16 teams ===
Location of teams in 2015–16 LNB Pro A

Team	Home city	Stadium	Capacity
Antibes Sharks	Antibes	Azur Arena Antibes	5,249
Monaco	(Monaco) Fontvieille	Salle Gaston Médecin	3,700
ASVEL Basket	Lyon – Villeurbanne	Astroballe	5,556
BCM Gravelines Dunkerque	Gravelines	Sportica	3,500
Champagne Châlons Reims	Reims	Complexe René-Tys	3,000
Cholet Basket	Cholet	La Meilleraie	5,191
Élan Béarnais Pau-Orthez	Pau	Palais des Sports de Pau	7,707
Élan Chalon	Chalon-sur-Saône	Le Colisée	5,000
JDA Dijon	Dijon	Palais des Sports Jean-Michel Geoffroy	5,000
JSF Nanterre	Nanterre	Palais des Sports de Nanterre	3,000
Le Mans Sarthe Basket	Le Mans	Antarès	6,003
Limoges CSP	Limoges	Beaublanc	6,000
Orléans Loiret Basket	Orléans	Zénith d'Orléans	5,338
Paris-Levallois Basket	Paris – Levallois	Stade Pierre de Coubertin; Palais des Sports Marcel Cerdan	4,200; 4,000
SLUC Nancy Basket	Nancy	Palais des Sports Jean Weille	6,027
Rouen Métropole Basket	Rouen	Kindarena	5,789
STB Le Havre	Le Havre	Salle des Docks Océane	3,598
Strasbourg IG	Strasbourg	Rhénus Sport	6,200

== Regular season ==
=== League table ===
Pos	Team	Pld	W	L	PF	PA	PR	Qualification or relegation
1	Monaco	34	27	7	2746	2540	1.081	Advance to playoffs
2	SIG Strasbourg	34	25	9	2677	2504	1.069	Advance to playoffs
3	Le Mans Sarthe	34	23	11	2617	2495	1.049	Advance to playoffs
4	Élan Chalon	34	22	12	2985	2807	1.063	Advance to playoffs
5	ASVEL	34	21	13	2503	2339	1.070	Advance to playoffs
6	BCM Gravelines Dunkerque	34	21	13	2564	2424	1.058	Advance to playoffs
7	Élan Béarnais Pau-Orthez	34	21	13	2656	2601	1.021	Advance to playoffs
8	JSF Nanterre	34	21	13	2708	2601	1.041	Advance to playoffs
9	JDA Dijon	34	19	15	2484	2356	1.054	
10	Limoges CSP	34	18	16	2575	2461	1.046	
11	Orléans Loiret	34	17	17	2501	2586	0.967	
12	Antibes Sharks	34	14	20	2524	2609	0.967	
13	Cholet	34	14	20	2692	2763	0.974	
14	Paris-Levallois	34	12	22	2480	2763	0.898	
15	Champagne Châlons Reims	34	10	24	2565	2762	0.929	
16	SLUC Nancy	34	10	24	2686	2776	0.968	
17	Rouen Métropole Basket	34	6	28	2523	2855	0.884	Relegation to Pro B
18	STB Le Havre	34	4	30	2441	2883	0.847	Relegation to Pro B

Source: LNB

== Playoffs ==
Quarterfinals
1	Monaco	2
8	JSF Nanterre	0
4	Élan Chalon	0
5	ASVEL	2
3	Le Mans	2
6	Gravelines-Dunkerque	1
2	Strasbourg IG	2
7	Élan Béarnais Pau-Orthez	0

Semifinals
1	Monaco	1
5	ASVEL	3
3	Le Mans	0
2	Strasbourg IG	3

Finals
5	ASVEL	3
2	Strasbourg IG	2

== Statistical leaders ==
After the end of the Regular Season.

=== Points ===
Pos	Player	Club	PPG
1	(United States) Michael Thompson	Élan Béarnais Pau-Orthez	17.9
2	(United States) Tim Blue	Antibes Sharks	16.4
3	(United States) Jamal Shuler	AS Monaco	16.4

=== Rebounds ===
Pos	Player	Club	RPG
1	(Benin) Mouphtaou Yarou	Le Mans	10.7
2	(United States) Drew Gordon	Élan Chalon	9.6
3	(United States) Randal Falker	SLUC Nancy	8.7

=== Assists ===
Pos	Player	Club	APG
1	(Ivory Coast) Souleyman Diabate	Rouen Métropole	6.5
2	(United States) John Roberson	Élan Chalon	6.1
3	(France) Andrew Albicy	Gravelines	6.0

== Awards ==
Player and team awards for the 2015–16 season
Most Valuable Player
- (United States) Devin Booker − Élan Chalon
Finals MVP
- (United States) Casper Ware − ASVEL
Five Best Players
- (United States) Devin Booker − Élan Chalon
- (United States) Michael Thompson − Élan Béarnais Pau-Orthez
- (France) Rodrigue Beaubois − Strasbourg IG
- (United States) Jamal Shuler − AS Monaco
- (France) Charles Lombahe-Kahudi – ASVEL
Best Defender
- (France) Charles Lombahe-Kahudi − ASVEL
Best Young Player
- (France) Frank Ntilikina − Strasbourg IG
Most Improved Player
- (France) Wilfried Yeguete − Élan Béarnais Pau-Orthez
Best Coach
- (France) Vincent Collet − Strasbourg IG

== All-Star Game ==
The All-Star Game was played on December 30, 2015, and was played at the Bercy Arena in Paris. Andrew Albicy was named the All-Star Game MVP.

(France) Team National
Pos	Player	Team
Starters
G	Rodrigue Beaubois	Strasbourg IG
F	Mickaël Gelabale	Le Mans
F	Charles Kahudi	ASVEL
C	Ali Traoré	CSP Limoges
C	Mam Jaiteh	JSF Nanterre
Reserves
G	Andrew Albicy	BCM Gravelines
G	Antoine Eito	Orléans
G	Billy Ouattara	AS Monaco
F	Nobel Boungou Colo	CSP Limoges
F	Ilian Evtimov	Elan Chalon
F	Louis Labeyrie	Paris-Levallois
C	Moustapha Fall	Antibes Sharks
Head coach: (Canada) J.D. Jackson (ASVEL)

Team International
Pos	Player	Team
Starters
G	(United States) Will Solomon	Antibes Sharks
G	(Germany) Heiko Schaffartzik	CSP Limoges
F	(United States) Mykal Riley	JSF Nanterre
C	(Australia) David Andersen	ASVEL
C	(United States) Marcus Dove	BCM Gravelines
Reserves
G	(United States) Michael Thompson	Élan Béarnais Pau-Orthez
G	(Serbia) DeMarcus Nelson	AS Monaco
G	(United States) Jeremy Hazell	Elan Chalon
F	(Puerto Rico) A.D. Vassallo	STB Le Havre
F	(United States) Drew Gordon	Châlons-Reims
F	(United States) Tim Blue	Antibes Sharks
C	(United States) Darryl Watkins	ASVEL
Head coach: (Montenegro) Zvezdan Mitrovic (AS Monaco)

== See also ==
- 2016 Leaders Cup
- 2015–16 French Basketball Cup
