= 2016–17 French Basketball Cup =

40th season of the domestic cup competition of French basketball

French Basketball Cup
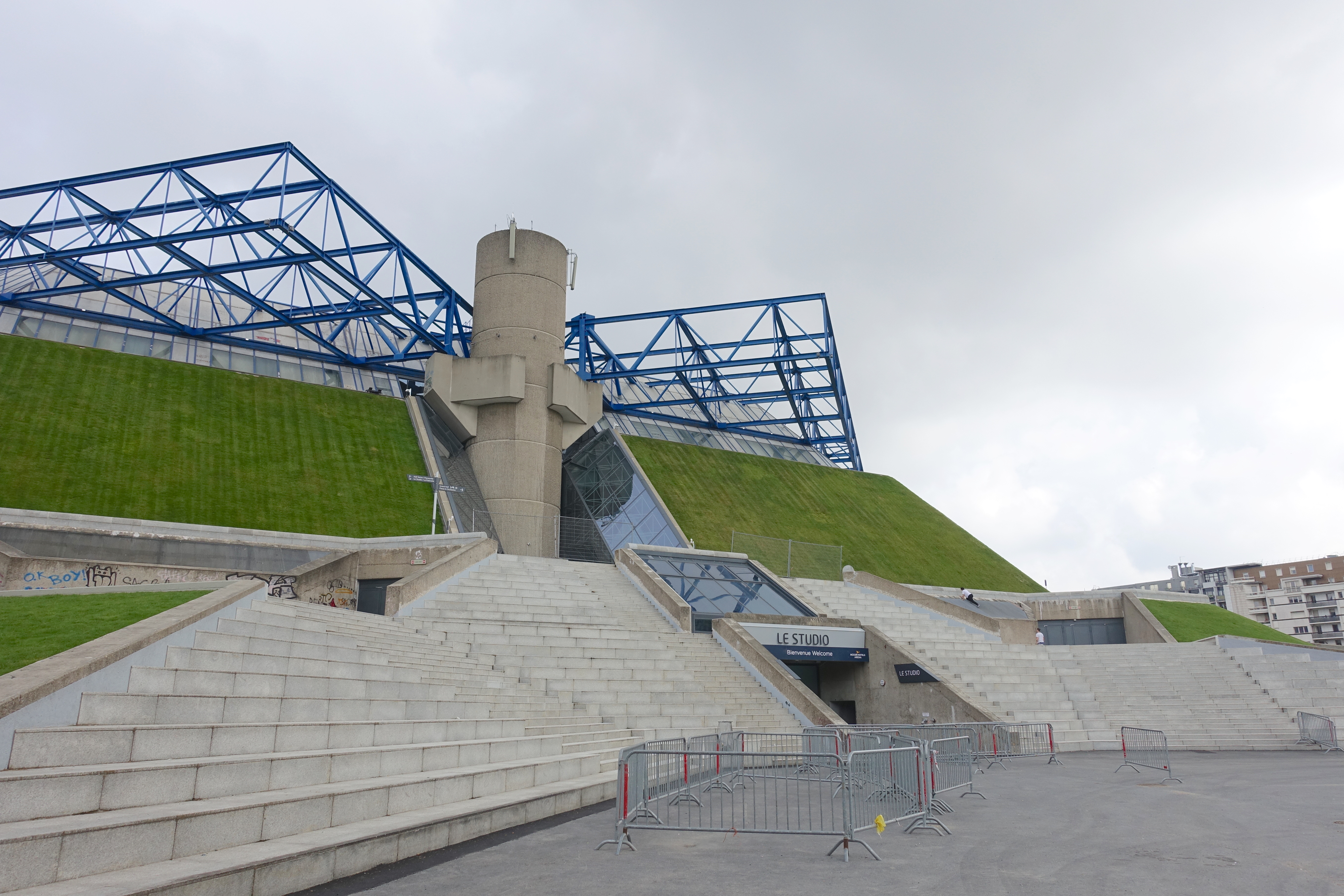
- The Final was played at the AccorHotels Arena
- Season: 2016–17
- Duration: September 13, 2016 – April 22, 2017
- Games played: 55
- Teams: 56

Finals
- Champions: Nanterre 92 (2nd title)
- Runners-up: Le Mans

Awards
- Final MVP: (Germany) Heiko Schaffartzik

The 2016–17 French Basketball Cup season (French: 2016–17 Coupe de France de Basket) was the 40th season of the domestic cup competition of French basketball. The competition started on September 9, 2016 and ended on April 22, 2017. Nanterre 92 won its second Cup title.

== Bracket ==
Eightfinals; 28 January
Lille Métropole	62
Le Mans	67
Hyères-Toulon	83
Champagne Châlons-Reims	67
Limoges CSP	72
Élan Chalon	80
ESSM Le Portel	84
Élan Béarnais Pau-Lacq-Orthez	78
Nanterre 92	99
SLUC Nancy	71
Paris-Levallois	68
JDA Dijon	81
Chorale Roanne	74
Antibes Sharks	82
Saint-Quentin	55
Monaco	83

Quarterfinals; 14 February
Le Mans	72
Hyères-Toulon	57
Élan Chalon	81
ESSM Le Portel	70
Nanterre 92	86
JDA Dijon	64
Antibes Sharks	85
Monaco	80

Semifinals; 21 March
Le Mans	81
Élan Chalon	72
Nanterre 92	81
Antibes Sharks	70

Final; 22 April
Le Mans	79
Nanterre 92	96

== Final ==
22 April 2017	Le Mans	79–96	Nanterre 92	Paris
19:30	Scoring by quarter: 19–23, 21–24, 16–23, 23–26
	Pts: Amagou 15; Rebs: Shorter 5 Asts: Watson 4 Eval: Amagou 24	Boxscore	Pts: Warren 26; Rebs: Warren 6 Asts: Warren 6 Eval: Warren 33	Arena: AccorHotels Arena

Le Mans	Nanterre

== See also ==
- 2016–17 Pro A season
