= 2017 FIBA Europe Cup Finals =

2017 FIBA Europe Cup Final
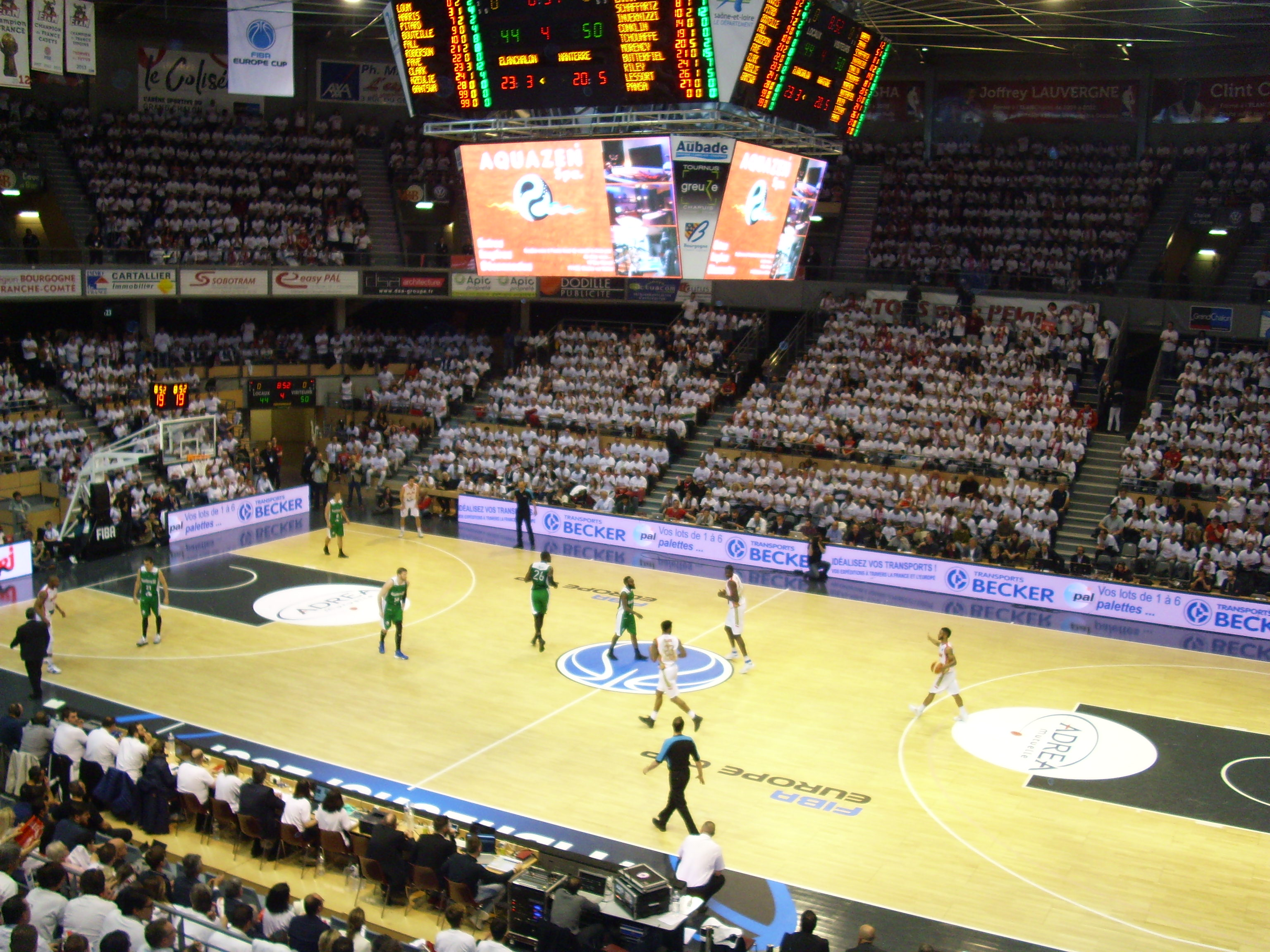
- Scene of the first leg of the Final at Le Colisée
- Event: 2016–17 FIBA Europe Cup
Élan Chalon	Nanterre 92
(France)	(France)
137	140

First leg
Élan Chalon	Nanterre 92
58	58
- Date: April 18, 2017
- Venue: Le Colisée, Chalon-sur-Saône
- Attendance: 4,900

Second leg
Nanterre 92	Élan Chalon
82	79
- Date: April 25, 2017
- Venue: Palais des Sports Maurice Thorez, Nanterre
- Attendance: 3,000

The 2017 FIBA Europe Cup Final were the concluding games of the 2016–17 FIBA Europe Cup season. The Finals were played in a two-legged format, with the first leg being played on April 19 and the second one on April 26, 2017.

The first leg was played at Le Colisée in Chalon-sur-Saône, at the home court of Élan Chalon. The second leg was played at the Palais des Sports Maurice Thorez in Nanterre, at the home court of Nanterre 92.

== Venue ==
The Le Colisée was the first leg venue as Élan Chalon venue. In the previous season Le Colisée hosted the 2016 FIBA Europe Cup Final Four. The stadium has a capacity of 5,000 people.

The Palais des Sports Maurice Thorez in Nanterre was the home venue of the second leg as the home court of Nanterre 92. The arena was built in 2015 and has a capacity for 3,000 people.

Chalon-sur-Saône	2017 FIBA Europe Cup Finals (Europe)	Nanterre
Le Colisée	2017 FIBA Europe Cup Finals (Europe)	Palais des Sports Maurice Thorez
Capacity: 5,000	2017 FIBA Europe Cup Finals (Europe)	Capacity: 3,000

== Road to the Finals ==
Note: In the table, the score of the finalist is given first (H = home; A = away).

(France) Élan Chalon				Round	(France) Nanterre 92			
Group A: Pos / Team / Pld / Pts; 1 / (France) Élan Chalon / 6 / 10; 2 / (Hungary) Alba Fehérvár / 6 / 10; 3 / (Portugal) Benfica / 6 / 9; 4 / (Belgium) Basic-Fit Brussels / 6 / 7; Source: FIBA Europe Cup				Regular season	Group D: Pos / Team / Pld / Pts; 1 / (France) Nanterre 92 / 6 / 12; 2 / (Belgium) Port of Antwerp Giants / 6 / 10; 3 / (Hungary) Sopron / 6 / 8; 4 / (Portugal) Porto / 6 / 6; Source: FIBA Europe Cup			
Group K: Pos / Team / Pld / Pts; 1 / (France) Élan Chalon / 6 / 11; 2 / (Turkey) Gaziantep / 6 / 11; 3 / (Sweden) Södertälje Kings / 6 / 7; 4 / (Romania) Mureș / 6 / 7; Source: FIBA Europe				Second round	Group N: Pos / Team / Pld / Pts; 1 / (Hungary) Egis Körmend / 6 / 10; 2 / (France) Nanterre 92 / 6 / 10; 3 / (Belarus) Tsmoki Minsk / 6 / 9; 4 / (Israel) Bnei Herzliya / 6 / 7; Source: FIBA Europe			
Opponent	Agg.	1st leg	2nd leg	Play-offs	Opponent	Agg.	1st leg	2nd leg
(Hungary) Egis Körmend	181–160	99–78 (A)	82–82 (H)	Round of 16	(Belgium) Proximus Spirou	157–132	85–84 (A)	86–76 (H)
(Croatia) Cibona	168–165	85–87 (A)	83–78 (H)	Quarterfinals	(Turkey) Muratbey Uşak Sportif	192–167	85–82 (A)	110–82 (H)
(Belgium) Telenet Oostende	163–150	80–85 (A)	83–65 (H)	Semifinals	(Germany) Telekom Baskets Bonn	162–158	76–77 (H)	86–81 (A)

== First leg ==
18 April 2017	Élan Chalon (France)	58–58	(France) Nanterre 92	Chalon-sur-Saône
20:30 (GMT)	Scoring by quarter: 15–15, 13–26, 14–9, 16–8
	Pts: Clark 16; Rebs: Fall 11; Asts: Roberson 8 PIR: Fall 20	Boxscore	Pts: Butterfield 15; Rebs: Riley 7 Asts: Schaffartzik 7 PIR: Butterfield 18	Arena: Le Colisée; Attendance: 4,900; Referees: Murat Biricik (TUR), Vicente Bultó (ESP), Manuel Mazzoni (ITA)

Starters:			Pts	Reb	Ast
PG	21	(United States) John Roberson	10	2	8
SG	3	(United States) Lance Harris	4	4	3
SF	9	(Cameroon) Jérémy Nzeulie	7	4	2
PF	23	(United States) Cameron Clark	16	3	0
C	10	(France) Moustapha Fall	11	11	1
Reserves:					
PF	0	(France) Abdoulaye Loum	2	1	0
PG	7	(France) Gédéon Pitard	4	2	0
SF	83	(France) Axel Bouteille	0	0	0
PF	22	(Cameroon) Ibrahima Fall Faye	0	0	0
G	28	(France) Wilfried Gantswa	DNP		
Head coach:
(French Federation of Basketball) Jean-Denys Choulet

Chalon	Nanterre

Starters:			Pts	Reb	Ast
PG	1	(United States) Chris Warren	3	2	1
SG	8	(Germany) Heiko Schaffartzik	7	1	7
SF	24	(United States) Mykal Riley	7	7	1
PF	11	(France) Hugo Invernizzi	12	4	0
C	26	(France) Mathias Lessort	7	3	1
Reserves:					
C	5	(Nigeria) Talib Zanna	4	3	1
PF	14	(United States) Brian Conklin	1	2	1
SG	19	(France) Bathiste Tchouaffe	0	0	0
PF	20	(France) Jean-Frédéric Morency	2	3	0
SG	21	(United States) Spencer Butterfield	15	5	0
F/C	27	(France) Jean-Marc Pansa	DNP		
Head coach:
(French Federation of Basketball) Pascal Donnadieu

- Team captains (C): (Cameroon) Jérémy Nzeulie (Élan Chalon) and (Germany) Heiko Schaffartzik (Nanterre 92)

== Second leg ==
25 April 2017	Nanterre 92 (France)	82–79 (140–137 agg.)	(France) Élan Chalon	Nanterre
20:30 (GMT)	Scoring by quarter: 31–26, 25–19, 13–23, 13–11
	Pts: Warren 24; Rebs: Butterfield 5 Asts: Warren 10	Boxscore	Pts: Clark 24; Rebs: Harris 5 Asts: Nzeulie 3	Arena: Palais des Sports Maurice Thorez; Attendance: 3,000; Referees: Antonio Conde (ESP), Saverio Lanzarini (ITA), Georgios Poursanidis (GRE)

Starters:			Pts	Reb	Ast
PG	1	(United States) Chris Warren	24	2	10
SG	8	(Germany) Heiko Schaffartzik	13	1	4
SF	24	(United States) Mykal Riley	4	4	2
PF	11	(France) Hugo Invernizzi	9	2	1
C	26	(France) Mathias Lessort	12	2	0
Reserves:					
C	5	(Nigeria) Talib Zanna	0	2	0
PF	14	(United States) Brian Conklin	2	3	0
SG	19	(France) Bathiste Tchouaffé	DNP		
PF	20	(France) Jean-Frédéric Morency	2	1	1
SG	21	(United States) Spencer Butterfield	16	5	2
F/C	27	(France) Jean-Marc Pansa	DNP		
Head coach:
(French Federation of Basketball) Pascal Donnadieu

Nanterre	Chalon

2017 FIBA Europe Cup champions
Nanterre 92
(1st title)

Starters:			Pts	Reb	Ast
PG	21	(United States) John Roberson	9	2	2
SG	7	(France) Gédéon Pitard	0	3	1
SF	9	(Cameroon) Jérémy Nzeulie	11	4	3
PF	23	(United States) Cameron Clark	24	5	1
C	10	(France) Moustapha Fall	17	4	2
Reserves:					
SG	3	(United States) Lance Harris	12	5	1
PF	0	(France) Abdoulaye Loum	0	1	0
SF	83	(France) Axel Bouteille	6	3	1
PF	22	(Cameroon) Ibrahima Fall Faye	DNP		
G	28	(France) Wilfried Gantswa	DNP		
Head coach:
(French Federation of Basketball) Jean-Denys Choulet

- Team captains (C): (Germany) Heiko Schaffartzik (Nanterre 92) and (Cameroon) Jérémy Nzeulie (Élan Chalon)

== See also ==
- 2017 EuroLeague Final Four
- 2017 EuroCup Finals
- 2017 Basketball Champions League Final Four
