= 2016–17 FIBA Europe Cup Play-offs =

The 2016–17 FIBA Europe Cup play-offs begin on 8 February and conclude on 19 and 26 April 2017, with the 2017 FIBA Europe Cup Finals, to decide the champions of the 2016–17 FIBA Europe Cup. A total of 16 teams competed in the play-offs.

Times up to 25 March 2017 (round of 16) are CET (UTC+1), thereafter (quarter-finals and beyond) times are CEST (UTC+2).

== Format ==
The play-offs involves 16 teams which qualified as winners of each one of the six groups in the second round, the two best runners-up and eight teams from the Basketball Champions League group stage.

Each tie in the knockout phase, is played over two legs, with each team playing one leg at home.

The draw was made without any restriction or seeding, being decided all the bracket by the luck of the draw in the round of 16.

== Qualified teams ==
=== Second round group winners and runners-up ===
The six group winners from the second round advanced to the play-offs, along with the two best second placed teams.

Group	Winners	Runners-up (2 best teams advance)
K	(France) Élan Chalon	(Turkey) Gaziantep
L	(Turkey) Demir İnşaat Büyükçekmece	
M	(Germany) Telekom Baskets Bonn	
N	(Hungary) Egis Körmend	(France) Nanterre 92
O	(France) Pau-Lacq-Orthez	
P	(Russia) Enisey	

=== Transfers from Champions League regular season ===
Eight teams from the 2016–17 Basketball Champions League Regular season transfer to the FIBA Europe Cup. These include the worst fifth-placed team, all sixth-placed teams and the two best seventh-placed teams.

Group	Fifth place (1 team)	Sixth place (5 teams)	Seventh place (2 teams)
A		(Israel) Ironi Nahariya	
B		(Romania) Oradea	(Finland) Kataja
C		(Turkey) Muratbey Uşak Sportif	
D	(Belgium) Telenet Oostende	(Croatia) Cibona	
E		(Belgium) Proximus Spirou	(Poland) Stelmet Zielona Góra

== Bracket ==
Round of 16
(Russia) Enisey	91	96	187
(Turkey) Büyükçekmece	81	104	185
(Belgium) Telenet Oostende	95	70	165
(France) Pau-Lacq-Orthez	86	72	158
(Poland) Stelmet Zielona Góra	69	83	152
(Croatia) Cibona	81	102	183
(Hungary) Egis Körmend	78	82	160
(France) Élan Chalon	99	82	181
(Romania) Oradea	82	82	164
(Turkey) Muratbey Uşak Sportif	72	108	180
(Belgium) Proximus Spirou	85	78	163
(France) Nanterre 92	84	86	170
(Germany) Telekom Baskets Bonn	91	88	179
(Finland) Kataja	72	84	156
(Israel) Ironi Nahariya	96	65	161
(Turkey) Gaziantep	75	80	155

Quarter-finals
(Russia) Enisey	84	79	163
(Belgium) Telenet Oostende	72	95	167
(Croatia) Cibona	87	78	165
(France) Élan Chalon	85	83	168
(Turkey) Muratbey Uşak Sportif	85	82	167
(France) Nanterre 92	82	110	192
(Germany) Telekom Baskets Bonn	89	80	169
(Israel) Ironi Nahariya	68	90	158

Semi-finals
(Belgium) Telenet Oostende	85	65	150
(France) Élan Chalon	80	83	163
(France) Nanterre 92	76	86	162
(Germany) Telekom Baskets Bonn	77	81	158

Final
(France) Élan Chalon	58	79	137
(France) Nanterre 92	58	82	140

== Round of 16 ==
The first legs will be played on 8 February, and the second legs will be played on 22 February 2017. Team 1 plays the second leg at home.

Team 1	Agg.	Team 2	1st leg	2nd leg
Ironi Nahariya (Israel)	161–155	(Turkey) Gaziantep	96–75	65–80
Egis Körmend (Hungary)	160–181	(France) Élan Chalon	78–99	82–82
Telenet Oostende (Belgium)	165–158	(France) Pau-Lacq-Orthez	95–86	70–72
Proximus Spirou (Belgium)	163–170	(France) Nanterre 92	85–84	78–86
Oradea (Romania)	164–180	(Turkey) Muratbey Uşak Sportif	82–72	82–108
Enisey (Russia)	187–185	(Turkey) Demir İnşaat Büyükçekmece	91–81	96–104
Stelmet Zielona Góra (Poland)	152–183	(Croatia) Cibona	69–81	83–102
Telekom Baskets Bonn (Germany)	179–156	(Finland) Kataja	91–72	88–84

=== First leg ===
8 February 2017	Enisey (Russia)	91–81	(Turkey) Demir İnşaat Büyükçekmece	Krasnoyarsk
13:10	Scoring by quarter: 19–19, 27–18, 29–25, 16–19
	Pts: Zavourev 18; Rebs: Elegar 11; Asts: Taylor 6 PIR: Elegar 21	Report	Pts: Buckner 15; Rebs: Caloiaro 10; Asts: Hayes 6 PIR: Buckner 17	Arena: Arena Sever; Attendance: 1,500; Referees: Marius Ciulin (ROU), Oskars Lucis (LAT), Branislav Mrdak (SRB)

8 February 2017	Oradea (Romania)	82–72	(Turkey) Muratbey Uşak Sportif	Oradea
17:15	Scoring by quarter: 25–15, 11–20, 21–21, 25–16
	Pts: Pašalić 25; Rebs: Nicoară 8 Asts: Mirković 9 PIR: Pašalić 31	Report	Pts: Freimanis, Harrison 16; Rebs: Auguste 11; Asts: Vasiliauskas 4 PIR: Auguste, Harrison 14	Arena: Antonio Alexe; Attendance: 1,800; Referees: Gianluca Mattioli (ITA), Janusz Calik (POL), Arnis Ozols (LAT)

8 February 2017	Ironi Nahariya (Israel)	96–75	(Turkey) Gaziantep	Nahariya
18:00	Scoring by quarter: 21–28, 24–14, 32–23, 19–10
	Pts: Kitchen 23; Rebs: Nash 10; Asts: Kitchen 8 PIR: Kitchen 36	Report	Pts: Rautins 19; Rebs: Jefferson 11; Asts: Denmon 5 PIR: Rautins 21	Arena: Ein Sara; Referees: Anastasios Piloidis (GRE), Ernad Karović (BIH), Andrei Sharapa (BLR)

8 February 2017	Egis Körmend (Hungary)	78–99	(France) Élan Chalon	Körmend
18:00	Scoring by quarter: 15–26, 22–13, 23–27, 18–33
	Pts: Petty 24; Rebs: Smith 10; Asts: Petty 6 PIR: Petty 23	Report	Pts: Clark 27; Rebs: Nzeulie 8 Asts: Roberson 7 PIR: Roberson 30	Arena: Szentély Aréna; Attendance: 1,955; Referees: Lorenzo Baldini (ITA), Sergei Beliakov (RUS), Anastasios Manos (GRE)

8 February 2017	Stelmet Zielona Góra (Poland)	69–81	(Croatia) Cibona	Zielona Góra
18:30	Scoring by quarter: 19–21, 18–14, 17–32, 15–14
	Pts: Kelati 19; Rebs: Kelati, Moore 6 Asts: Kelati 3 PIR: Kelati 25	Report	Pts: Slavica 16; Rebs: Slavica, Sulejmanović 6 Asts: Reynolds 7 PIR: Slavica 20	Arena: CRS Hala; Attendance: 3,116; Referees: Apostolos Kalpakas (SWE), Sergiy Chebyshev (UKR), Petr Hrusa (CZE)

8 February 2017	Telekom Baskets Bonn (Germany)	91–72	(Finland) Kataja	Bonn
19:30	Scoring by quarter: 27–22, 16–14, 30–20, 18–16
	Pts: Mayo, Thompson 15; Rebs: Gamble 9 Asts: Thompson 7 PIR: Bartolo 20	Report	Pts: Brown 26; Rebs: Brown 11; Asts: Seppala 5 PIR: Brown 30	Arena: Telekom Dome; Attendance: 3,750; Referees: Georgios Poursanidis (GRE), Saša Maričić (SRB), Saulius Racys (SWE)

8 February 2017	Telenet Oostende (Belgium)	95–86	(France) Pau-Lacq-Orthez	Ostend
20:30	Scoring by quarter: 29–17, 17–29, 24–18, 25–22
	Pts: Boukichou, Đorđević 17; Rebs: Mwema 8 Asts: Đorđević 5 PIR: Đorđević 22	Report	Pts: Mipoka 17; Rebs: Koffi 11; Asts: Cooper 6 PIR: Koffi 25	Arena: Sleuyter Arena; Attendance: 2,130; Referees: Borys Shulga (UKR), Alexey Davydov (RUS), Ventsislav Velikov (BUL)

8 February 2017	Proximus Spirou (Belgium)	85–84	(France) Nanterre 92	Charleroi
20:30	Scoring by quarter: 25–29, 21–21, 21–19, 18–15
	Pts: Richardson 20; Rebs: Marnegrave 6 Asts: Marnegrave 12; PIR: Richardson 18	Report	Pts: Warren 19; Rebs: Lessort 7 Asts: Warren 7 PIR: Warren 25	Arena: Spiroudome; Attendance: 6,000; Referees: Marek Cmikiewicz (POL), Michele Rossi (ITA), Gintaras Vitkauskas (LTU)

=== Second leg ===
22 February 2017	Gaziantep (Turkey)	80–65 (155–161 agg.)	(Israel) Ironi Nahariya	Gaziantep
17:00	Scoring by quarter: 23–10, 15–18, 25–15, 17–22
	Pts: Denmon, Rautins 26; Rebs: Jefferson 8 Asts: Denmon 7 PIR: Denmon 29	Report	Pts: Skjöldebrand 18; Rebs: Nash 8 Asts: Kitchen 5 PIR: Skjöldebrand 19	Arena: Kamil Ocak; Attendance: 3,000; Referees: Nicolas Maestre (FRA), Haris Bijedić (BIH), Aleksandar Milojević (MKD)

22 February 2017	Demir İnşaat Büyükçekmece (Turkey)	104–96(OT) (185–187 agg.)	(Russia) Enisey	Istanbul
17:00	Scoring by quarter: 19–20, 28–15, 16–17, 22–23, Overtime: 10–10, 9–11
	Pts: Hayes 26; Rebs: Stipanović 8 Asts: Johnson 7 PIR: Johnson 27	Report	Pts: Elegar 23; Rebs: Elegar 11; Asts: Zavourev 8 PIR: Elegar 29	Arena: Gazanfer Bilge; Attendance: 300; Referees: Yohan Rosso (FRA), Lorenzo Baldini (ITA), Ivan Miličević (BIH)

22 February 2017	Kataja (Finland)	84–88 (156–179 agg.)	(Germany) Telekom Baskets Bonn	Joensuu
17:30	Scoring by quarter: 22–19, 28–19, 22–22, 12–28
	Pts: King 29; Rebs: Bristol 7 Asts: Rannikko 7 PIR: King 26	Report	Pts: Gamble 27; Rebs: Bartolo 8 Asts: Sanders 5 PIR: Gamble 27	Arena: Joensuu Arena; Attendance: 1,323; Referees: Marek Maliszewski (POL), Mārtiņš Kozlovskis (LAT), Artūras Šukys (LTU)

22 February 2017	Muratbey Uşak Sportif (Turkey)	108–82 (180–164 agg.)	(Romania) Oradea	Uşak
18:30	Scoring by quarter: 30–19, 28–25, 22–22, 28–16
	Pts: Auguste 30; Rebs: Auguste 12; Asts: Harrison 7 PIR: Auguste 37	Report	Pts: Zeno 21; Rebs: Nicoară, Ţîbîrnă 4 Asts: Mandache 7 PIR: Mirković 6	Arena: Uşak Üniversitesi; Attendance: 1,710; Referees: Antonio Conde (ESP), Sergei Beliakov (RUS), Manuel Mazzoni (ITA)

22 February 2017	Cibona (Croatia)	102–83 (183–152 agg.)	(Poland) Stelmet Zielona Góra	Zagreb
18:30	Scoring by quarter: 20–19, 23–18, 36–16, 23–30
	Pts: Reynolds 19; Rebs: Sulejmanović 6 Asts: Šakić 5 PIR: Joksimović 28	Report	Pts: Moore 22; Rebs: Moore 8 Asts: Florence 4 PIR: Moore 31	Arena: Dražen Petrović; Attendance: 600; Referees: Tolga Sahin (ITA), Martin Horozov (BUL), Yener Yılmaz (TUR)

22 February 2017	Élan Chalon (France)	82–82 (181–160 agg.)	(Hungary) Egis Körmend	Chalon-sur-Saône
20:00	Scoring by quarter: 21–20, 20–14, 20–22, 21–26
	Pts: Roberson 23; Rebs: Fall 12; Asts: Roberson 6 PIR: Roberson 22	Report	Pts: Allen 25; Rebs: Allen, Petty 11; Asts: Petty 4 PIR: Allen 23	Arena: Le Colisée; Attendance: 2,900; Referees: Tomas Jasevičius (LTU), Bojan Jovanić (BIH), Tomislav Vovk (CRO)

22 February 2017	Pau-Lacq-Orthez (France)	72–70 (158–165 agg.)	(Belgium) Telenet Oostende	Pau
20:00	Scoring by quarter: 17–22, 14–14, 21–18, 20–16
	Pts: Cooper 22; Rebs: Lewis 10; Asts: Cooper 14; PIR: Cooper 25	Report	Pts: Katić 26; Rebs: Katić 9 Asts: Đorđević 9 PIR: Đorđević 29	Arena: Palais des Sports; Attendance: 3,000; Referees: Saverio Lanzarini (ITA), Boris Krejić (SLO), Óscar Perea (ESP)

22 February 2017	Nanterre 92 (France)	86–78 (170–163 agg.)	(Belgium) Proximus Spirou	Nanterre
20:30	Scoring by quarter: 25–22, 22–20, 17–15, 21–21
	Pts: Warren 23; Rebs: Lessort 6 Asts: Schaffartzik 7 PIR: Warren 24	Report	Pts: Richardson 23; Rebs: Iarochevitch 6 Asts: Marnegrave 4 PIR: Richardson 21	Arena: Maurice Thorez; Attendance: 1,802; Referees: Murat Biricik (TUR), Francisco Araña (ESP), Janusz Calik (POL)

== Quarter-finals ==
The first legs will be played on 8 March, and the second legs will be played on 15 March 2017.

Team 1	Agg.	Team 2	1st leg	2nd leg
Telekom Baskets Bonn (Germany)	169–158	(Israel) Ironi Nahariya	89–68	80–90
Cibona (Croatia)	165–168	(France) Élan Chalon	87–85	78–83
Enisey (Russia)	163–167	(Belgium) Telenet Oostende	84–72	79–95
Muratbey Uşak Sportif (Turkey)	167–192	(France) Nanterre 92	85–82	82–110

=== First leg ===
7 March 2017	Muratbey Uşak Sportif (Turkey)	85–82	(France) Nanterre 92	Uşak
17:00	Scoring by quarter: 27–13, 19–22, 16–23, 23–24
	Pts: McKissic 19; Rebs: McKissic 8 Asts: Vasiliauskas 6 PIR: McKissic 25	Report	Pts: Schaffartzik 20; Rebs: Lessort 6 Asts: Butterfield 4 PIR: Schaffartzik 20	Arena: Uşak Üniversitesi; Attendance: 2,060; Referees: Manuel Mazzoni (ITA), Sergiy Chebyshev (UKR), Artūras Šukys (LTU)

8 March 2017	Enisey (Russia)	84–72	(Belgium) Telenet Oostende	Krasnoyarsk
13:10	Scoring by quarter: 27–15, 18–23, 15–21, 24–13
	Pts: Hilliard 20; Rebs: Elegar 10; Asts: Zavourev 7 PIR: Hilliard 20	Report	Pts: Kesteloot 13; Rebs: Katić 8 Asts: Đorđević, Newbill 4 PIR: Jagodić-Kuridža 11	Arena: Arena Sever; Attendance: 2,100; Referees: Marek Cmikiewicz (POL), Sebastien Clivaz (SUI), Anastasios Piloidis (GRE)

8 March 2017	Cibona (Croatia)	87–85	(France) Élan Chalon	Zagreb
18:30	Scoring by quarter: 22–23, 26–25, 20–20, 19–17
	Pts: Reynolds 20; Rebs: Šakić 6 Asts: Reynolds 15; PIR: Reynolds 36	Report	Pts: Roberson 39; Rebs: Fall 8 Asts: Nzeulie 7 PIR: Roberson 35	Arena: Dražen Petrović; Attendance: 250; Referees: Georgios Poursanidis (GRE), Lorenzo Baldini (ITA), Petr Hruša (CZE)

8 March 2017	Telekom Baskets Bonn (Germany)	89–68	(Israel) Ironi Nahariya	Bonn
19:30	Scoring by quarter: 25–5, 17–18, 18–22, 29–23
	Pts: Gamble 25; Rebs: Gamble 14; Asts: Thompson 5 PIR: Gamble 37	Report	Pts: Hopson 19; Rebs: three players 4 Asts: Gates 4 PIR: Hopson 18	Arena: Telekom Dome; Attendance: 3,410; Referees: Radomir Vojinović (MNE), Sergei Beliakov (RUS), Michele Rossi (ITA)

=== Second leg ===
14 March 2017	Nanterre 92 (France)	110–82 (192–167 agg.)	(Turkey) Muratbey Uşak Sportif	Nanterre
19:00	Scoring by quarter: 26–10, 30–24, 20–30, 34–18
	Pts: Butterfield 39; Rebs: Lessort 12; Asts: Schaffartzik 10; PIR: Butterfield 33	Report	Pts: McKissic 16; Rebs: Auguste 10; Asts: three players 3 PIR: Auguste 16	Arena: Maurice Thorez; Attendance: 2,004; Referees: Srđan Dožai (CRO), Luis Miguel Castillo Larroca (ESP), Mārtiņš Kozlovskis (LAT)

15 March 2017	Ironi Nahariya (Israel)	90–80 (158–169 agg.)	(Germany) Telekom Baskets Bonn	Nahariya
18:30	Scoring by quarter: 26–22, 18–19, 20–22, 26–17
	Pts: Hopson 31; Rebs: Gates, Kitchen 6 Asts: Kitchen 6 PIR: Hopson 27	Report	Pts: Gamble 22; Rebs: Gamble 14; Asts: Thompson 7 PIR: Gamble 29	Arena: Ein Sara; Attendance: 500; Referees: Murat Biricik (TUR), Panagiotis Anastopoulos (GRE), Gellert Kapitany (HUN)

15 March 2017	Telenet Oostende (Belgium)	95–79(OT) (167–163 agg.)	(Russia) Enisey	Ostend
20:30	Scoring by quarter: 21–14, 30–22, 14–18, 19–18, Overtime: 11–7
	Pts: Walden 25; Rebs: Walden 6 Asts: Đorđević 5 PIR: Walden 35	Report	Pts: Hilliard 20; Rebs: Elegar 15; Asts: Braimoh 4 PIR: Elegar 30	Arena: Sleuyter Arena; Attendance: 3,225; Referees: Antonio Conde (ESP), Mehdi Difallah (FRA), Zdravko Rutešić (MNE)

21 March 2017	Élan Chalon (France)	83–78 (168–165 agg.)	(Croatia) Cibona	Chalon-sur-Saône
20:30	Scoring by quarter: 21–16, 15–23, 23–21, 24–18
	Pts: Clark 26; Rebs: Fall 10; Asts: Roberson 7 PIR: Clark 23	Report	Pts: Žorić 25; Rebs: Žorić 7 Asts: Reynolds 11; PIR: Reynolds 25	Arena: Le Colisée; Attendance: 3,800; Referees: Vicente Bultó (ESP), Gentian Cici (ALB), Martin Horozov (BUL)

== Semi-finals ==
The first legs will be played on 29 March, and the second legs will be played on 5 April 2017.

Team 1	Agg.	Team 2	1st leg	2nd leg
Nanterre 92 (France)	162–158	(Germany) Telekom Baskets Bonn	76–77	86–81
Telenet Oostende (Belgium)	150–163	(France) Élan Chalon	85–80	65–83

=== First leg ===
29 March 2017	Nanterre 92 (France)	76–77	(Germany) Telekom Baskets Bonn	Nanterre
19:00	Scoring by quarter: 17–17, 17–18, 25–27, 17–15
	Pts: Warren 20; Rebs: Lessort 7 Asts: three players 3 PIR: Butterfield, Warren 17	Report	Pts: Gamble 26; Rebs: Bartolo 8 Asts: Mayo 5 PIR: Gamble 27	Arena: Maurice Thorez; Attendance: 2,040; Referees: Saverio Lanzarini (ITA), Petar Obradović (BIH), Ventsislav Velikov (BUL)

29 March 2017	Telenet Oostende (Belgium)	85–80	(France) Élan Chalon	Ostend
20:30	Scoring by quarter: 22–18, 22–21, 24–18, 17–23
	Pts: Katić 23; Rebs: Gillet 8 Asts: Đorđević 4 PIR: Katić 21	Report	Pts: Clark 28; Rebs: Clark 8 Asts: Roberson 5 PIR: Clark 29	Arena: Sleuyter Arena; Attendance: 3,452; Referees: Ademir Zurapović (BIH), Mārtiņš Kozlovskis (LAT), Markos Michaelides (SUI)

=== Second leg ===
5 April 2017	Telekom Baskets Bonn (Germany)	81–86 (158–162 agg.)	(France) Nanterre 92	Bonn
19:30	Scoring by quarter: 30–22, 17–17, 24–21, 10–26
	Pts: Horton 24; Rebs: Gamble 6 Asts: Mayo 9 PIR: Horton 29	Report	Pts: Warren 24; Rebs: Lessort 7 Asts: Schaffartzik 6 PIR: Lessort 25	Arena: Telekom Dome; Attendance: 6,000; Referees: Srđan Dožai (CRO), Gentian Cici (ALB), Michał Proc (POL)

5 April 2017	Élan Chalon (France)	83–65 (163–150 agg.)	(Belgium) Telenet Oostende	Chalon-sur-Saône
19:30	Scoring by quarter: 31–26, 13–12, 17–14, 22–13
	Pts: Clark 27; Rebs: Fall 9 Asts: Roberson 7 PIR: Clark 26	Report	Pts: Gillet 19; Rebs: Gillet, Katić 7 Asts: Đorđević 9 PIR: Gillet 22	Arena: Le Colisée; Attendance: 4,900; Referees: Antonio Conde (ESP), Artūras Šukys (LTU), Radomir Vojinović (MNE)

== Final ==
The first leg of the Final was played on 18 April and the second leg was played on 25 April 2017.

Team 1	Agg.	Team 2	1st leg	2nd leg
Élan Chalon (France)	137–140	(France) Nanterre 92	58–58	79–82

=== First leg ===
18 April 2017	Élan Chalon (France)	58–58	(France) Nanterre 92	Chalon-sur-Saône
20:30 (GMT)	Scoring by quarter: 15–15, 13–26, 14–9, 16–8
	Pts: Clark 16; Rebs: Fall 11; Asts: Roberson 8 PIR: Fall 20	Boxscore	Pts: Butterfield 15; Rebs: Riley 7 Asts: Schaffartzik 7 PIR: Butterfield 18	Arena: Le Colisée; Attendance: 4,900; Referees: Murat Biricik (TUR), Vicente Bultó (ESP), Manuel Mazzoni (ITA)

=== Second leg ===
25 April 2017	Nanterre 92 (France)	82–79 (140–137 agg.)	(France) Élan Chalon	Nanterre
20:30 (GMT)	Scoring by quarter: 31–26, 25–19, 13–23, 13–11
	Pts: Warren 24; Rebs: Butterfield 5 Asts: Warren 10	Boxscore	Pts: Clark 24; Rebs: Harris 5 Asts: Nzeulie 3	Arena: Palais des Sports Maurice Thorez; Attendance: 3,000; Referees: Antonio Conde (ESP), Saverio Lanzarini (ITA), Georgios Poursanidis (GRE)
