= Terry Allen (basketball) =

American basketball player (born 1993)

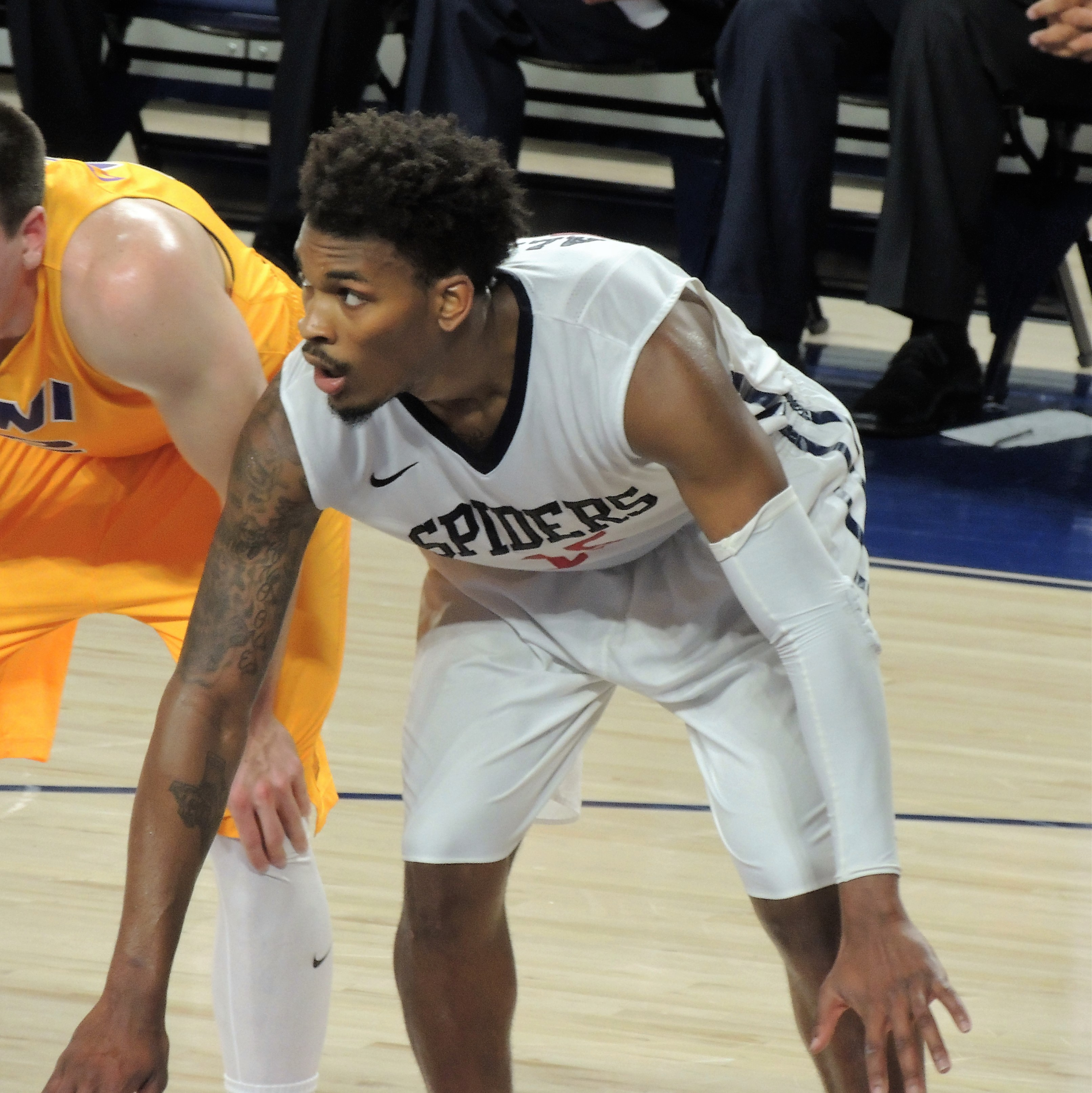
- Allen playing for Richmond, 2015

Free Agent
- Position: Power forward / small forward

Personal information
- Born: December 29, 1993 (age 32) Houston, Texas, U.S.
- Listed height: 203 cm (6 ft 8 in)
- Listed weight: 109 kg (240 lb)

Career information
- High school: Manvel (Manvel, Texas)
- College: Richmond (2012–2016)
- NBA draft: 2016: undrafted
- Playing career: 2016–present

Career history
- 2016–2017: EGIS Körmend
- 2017–2018: BCM Gravelines
- 2018–2019: Ironi Nahariya
- 2019–2020: BG Göttingen
- 2020–2021: Hamburg Towers
- 2021–2022: Medi Bayreuth
- 2022–2023: ESSM Le Portel
- 2023–2024: Treviso Basket
- 2024–2025: Levanga Hokkaido
- 2025–2026: Scafati Basket

Career highlights
- Serie A2 champion (2026); Hungarian League All-Star (2017); Third-team All-Atlantic 10 (2016)

Terry Du'Aun Allen (born December 29, 1993) is an American professional basketball player who last played for Scafati Basket of the Lega Basket Serie A. He played college basketball for the Richmond Spiders before playing professionally in Hungary, France and Israel. Standing at 6 ft 8 in (2.03 m), he plays at the power forward and small forward positions.

== Early life and college career ==
Allen attended Manvel High School in Manvel, Texas. He played college basketball for the University of Richmond's Spiders.

In his senior year at Richmond, Allen averaged 17.1 points, 7.6 rebounds, 2.1 assists and 1.6 steals per game.

On March 8, 2016, Allen was named 2016 All-Atlantic 10 Third Team.

== Professional career ==
=== EGIS Körmend (2016–2017) ===
On August 14, 2016, Allen started his professional career with the Hungarian team EGIS Körmend, signing a one-year deal. On November 8, 2016, Allen recorded a career-high 37 points, shooting 15-of-23 from the field, along with seven rebounds and two assists in a 92–75 win over Limburg United. He was subsequently named FIBA Europe Cup round 4 Top Performer.

Allen helped Körmend reach the 2017 Hungarian League Semifinals, as well as the 2017 FIBA Europe Cup Round of 16, where they eventually lost to Élan Chalon. In 53 game played during the 2016–17 season, he averaged 17.4 points, 5.6 rebounds, 2 assists and 1.2 steals per game.

=== Gravelines-Dunkerque (2017–2018) ===
On June 16, 2017, Allen signed a one-year deal with the French team BCM Gravelines-Dunkerque. On July 1, 2017, Allen joined the Utah Jazz for the 2017 NBA Summer League. On October 21, 2017, Allen recorded a season-high 32 points, shooting 13-of-17 from the field, along with four rebounds in a 75–74 win over Élan Chalon.

=== Ironi Nahariya (2018–2019) ===
On July 9, 2018, Allen signed with the Israeli team Ironi Nahariya for the 2018–19 season. On February 28, 2019, Allen recorded a season-high 25 points, shooting 11-of-17 from the field, in a 75–93 loss to Hapoel Eilat. In 33 games played for Nahariya, he averaged 11.9 points, 5.4 rebounds and 2.1 assists per game.

=== Göttingen (2019–2020) ===
On July 29, 2019, Allen signed a one-year deal with the German team BG Göttingen. He averaged 10.7 points, 3.7 rebounds and 1.3 assists per game and was voted to Eurobasket.com All-German Bundesliga Honorable Mention.

=== Hamburg Towers (2020–2021) ===
On August 15, 2020, Allen signed with the German team Hamburg Towers.

=== Medi Bayreuth (2021–2022) ===
On July 15, 2021, Allen signed a one-year deal with the German team Medi Bayreuth.

=== ESSM Le Portel (2022–2023) ===
On July 15, 2022, Allen signed with ESSM Le Portel of the LNB Pro A.

=== Universo Treviso Basket (2023–2024) ===
On July 27, 2023, he signed with Treviso Basket of the Lega Basket Serie A.

=== Scafati Basket (2025–2026) ===
On July 2, 2025, he signed with Scafati Basket of the Lega Basket Serie A.
