= Slobodan Šljivančanin =

Montenegrin-Macedonian basketball player

Personal information
- Born: May 1, 1972 (age 54) Nikšić, SR Montenegro, SFR Yugoslavia
- Listed height: 2.09 m (6 ft 10 in)

Career information
- NBA draft: 1994: undrafted
- Playing career: 1990–2002
- Position: Center

Career history
- 1990–1991: Partizan
- 1993–1994: OKK Beograd
- 1995–1996: Beovuk
- 1996–1997: Kyiv
- 1997–1998: Kaposvári
- 1998: Śląsk Wrocław
- 1999: Keravnos
- 1999–2000: UNICS Kazan
- 2000: Crvena zvezda
- 2001: Élan Béarnais Pau-Orthez
- 2001: Élan Chalon
- 2002: Ovarense
- 2002: Hemofarm

Career highlights
- French League champion (2001)

Slobodan Šljivančanin (born May 1, 1972) is a former professional basketball player. At 2.09 m (6 ft 10 in) in height, he played the center position.

== Career ==
Šljivančanin started his pro career with KK Partizan (1990–91) and also played for OKK Beograd, Keravnos, BC UNICS, KK Crvena zvezda (2000–01), Pau-Orthez (2001), Elan Chalon (2001), KK Hemofarm (2001–02) and Ovarense (2002).

Šljivančanin represented Macedonia at international level. From 2001 to 2002, he played five games for their national team during the qualification for EuroBasket 2003.

Šljivančanin retired in October 2002 due to health problems.
