= Mykal Riley =

American basketball player (born 1985)

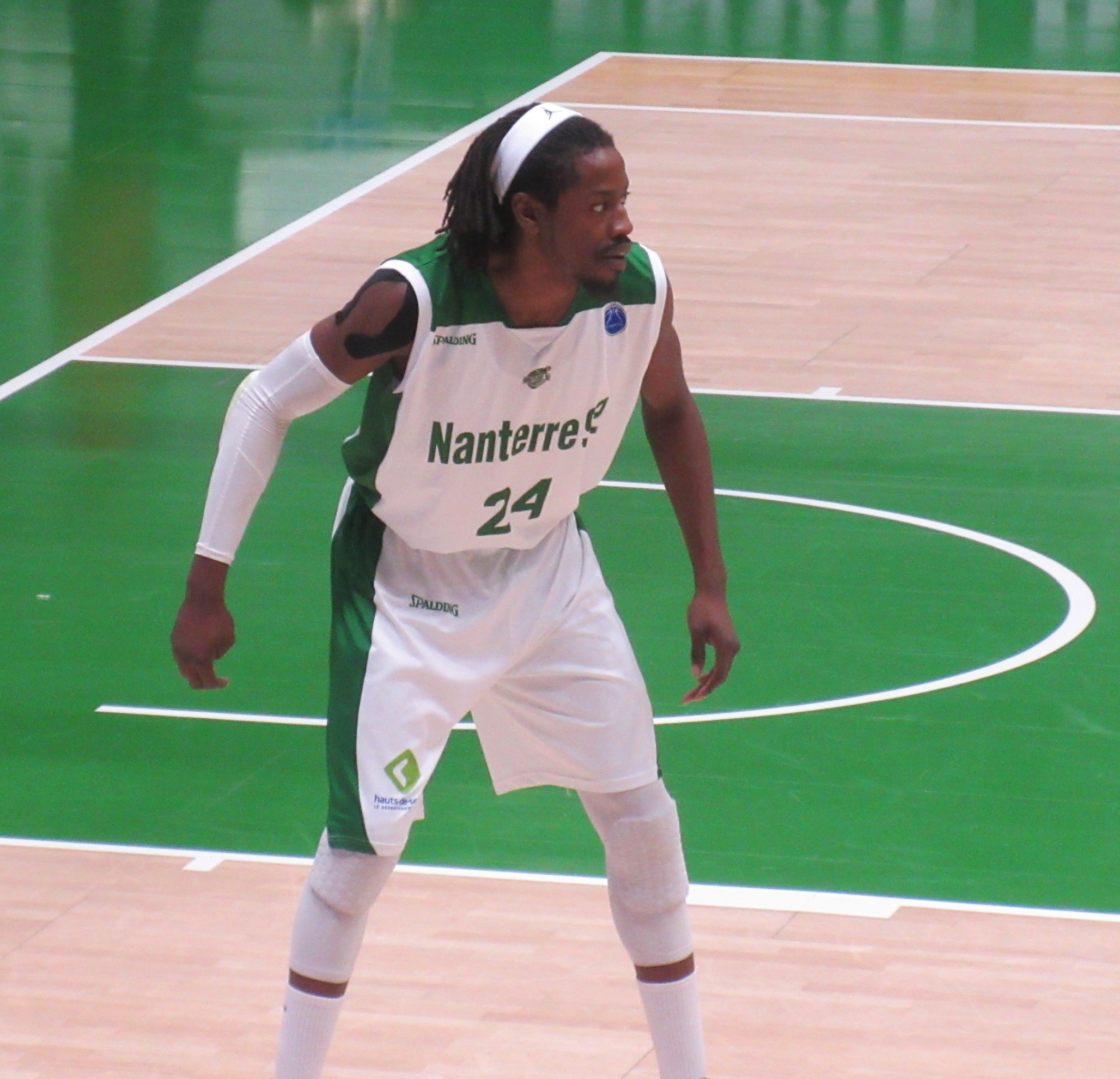
- Riley in 2017

Free Agent
- Position: Small forward

Personal information
- Born: July 14, 1985 (age 41) Pine Bluff, Arkansas, U.S.
- Listed height: 6 ft 6 in (1.98 m)
- Listed weight: 187 lb (85 kg)

Career information
- High school: Pine Bluff (Pine Bluff, Arkansas)
- College: Panola (2004−2006); Alabama (2006−2008)
- NBA draft: 2008: undrafted
- Playing career: 2008–present

Career history
- 2008–2009: Ferrara
- 2009: Imola
- 2009–2012: JSF Nanterre
- 2013: Bucaneros de La Guaira
- 2013–2014: JDA Dijon
- 2014–2017: Nanterre 92
- 2017–2018: Le Mans
- 2018–2019: Élan Chalon
- 2019–2020: Bursaspor

Career highlights
- Pro A champion (2018); FIBA Europe Cup champion (2017); French Cup champion (2017); EuroChallenge champion (2015); Match des Champions champion (2014)

Mykal Reginald Riley (born July 14, 1985) is an American professional basketball player, who lastly played for Bursaspor of the Turkish Super League. Standing at 1.98 m (6 ft 6 in), he plays the small forward position.

He is best known for his last-second three-point shot against Mississippi State in the 2008 SEC men's basketball tournament (he was named to the All-Tournament Team): the shot extended the game into overtime, possibly preventing thousands of fans from walking out of the Georgia Dome at the time a tornado struck the area.
