= Jean-Frédéric Morency =

French basketball player

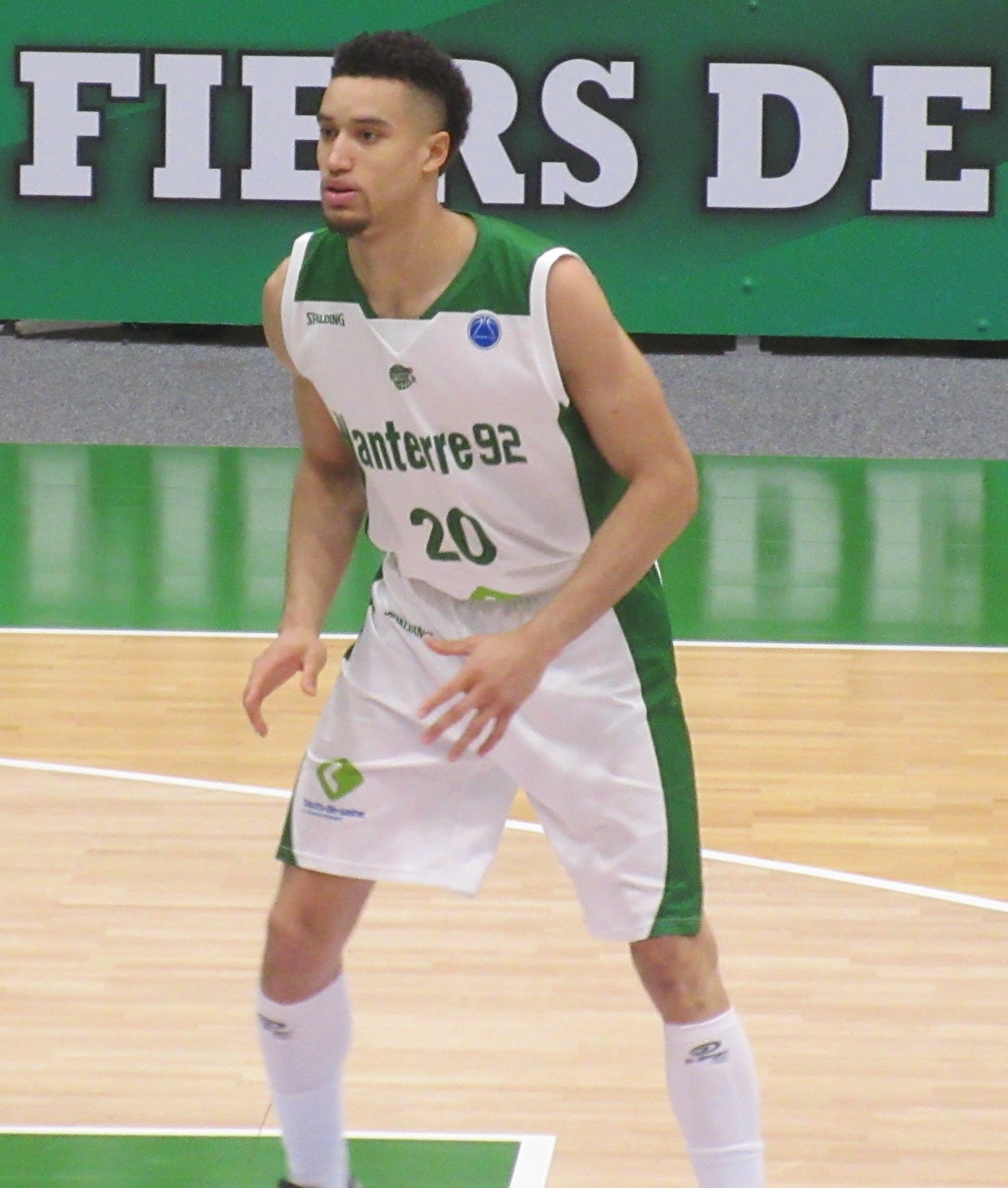
- Morency with Nanterre 92 in 2017

Free Agent
- Position: Small forward

Personal information
- Born: 30 May 1989 (age 37) Paris, France
- Listed height: 199 cm (6 ft 6 in)

Career information
- Playing career: 2008–present

Career history
- 2008–2014: Pau-Orthez
- 2014–2016: BCM Gravelines
- 2016–2017: Nanterre 92
- 2017–2018: Limoges CSP
- 2018–2021: Boulazac Basket Dordogne

Career highlights
- FIBA Europe Cup champion (2017); French Cup champion (2017); Pro B champion (2010)

Jean-Frédéric Morency (born 30 May 1989 in Paris, France) is a French basketball player who last played for French Pro A league club Boulazac Basket Dordogne. He formally played for BCM Gravelines.
