= Gédéon Pitard =

Cameroonian basketball player

No. 7 – Antibes Sharks
- Position: Point guard
- League: LNB Pro B

Personal information
- Born: February 7, 1989 (age 37) Ekom, Littoral Region (Cameroon)
- Listed height: 6 ft 2 in (1.88 m)
- Listed weight: 185 lb (84 kg)

Career information
- NBA draft: 2011: undrafted
- Playing career: 2007–present

Career history
- 2007–2015: STB Le Havre
- 2015–2016: Le Mans Sarthe
- 2016–2017: Élan Chalon
- 2017–2019: Châlons-Reims
- 2019–present: Antibes Sharks

Career highlights
- French League champion (2017)

Gédéon Pitard (born 7 February 1989) is a Cameroonian professional basketball player for Antibes Sharks of LNB Pro B.

After six seasons in STB Le Havre, he joined Le Mans Sarthe for two seasons. After being cut by the club Sarthois, he signed on 1 July 2016 for the club Elan Chalon. Pitard joined Châlons-Reims in June 2017.
