= 2016–17 FIBA Europe Cup =

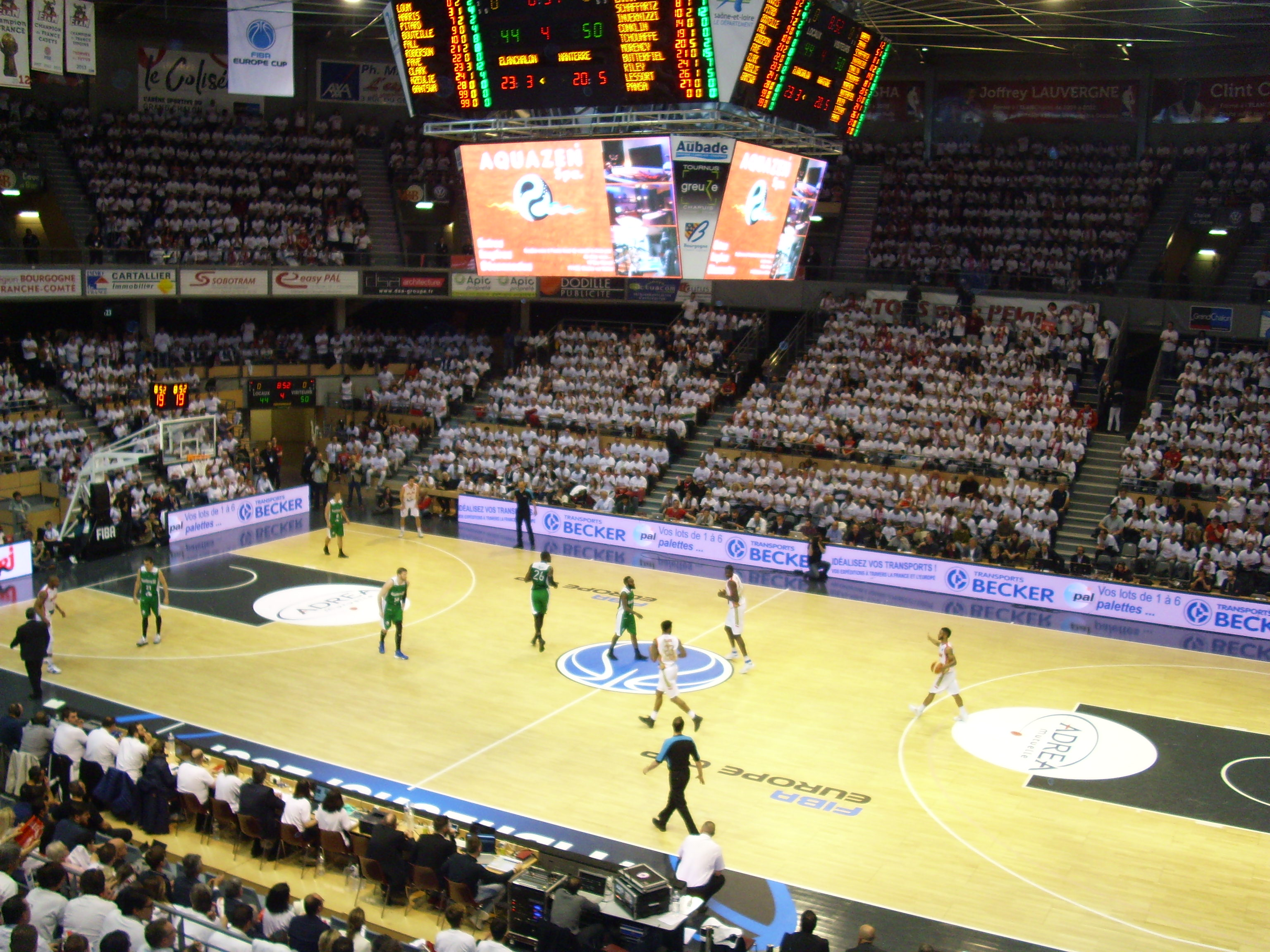
- Scene of the first leg of the Final at Le Colisée
- Season: 2016–17
- Duration: 18 October 2016 – 26 April 2017
- Games played: 204
- Teams: 38+8

Finals
- Champions: (France) Nanterre 92 (1st title)
- Runners-up: (France) Élan Chalon
- Semi-finalists: (Germany) Telekom Baskets Bonn (Belgium) Telenet Oostende

Statistical leaders
Points	(United States) Cameron Clark	20.0
Rebounds	(United States Virgin Islands) Frank Elegar	10.2
Assists	(United States) D. J. Cooper	9.2
Index Rating	(United States Virgin Islands) Frank Elegar	23.8

Seasons
- ← 2015–16 2017–18 →

The 2016–17 FIBA Europe Cup was the 2nd season of the FIBA Europe Cup, a European basketball club competition organised by FIBA Europe. The season began on 18 October 2016, with the regular season, and concluded on April 25, 2017, with the second leg of the Finals. Nanterre 92 was crowned FIBA Europe Cup champions after defeating Élan Chalon.

== Format changes ==
The regular season phase 1 will be joined by 38 teams, 26 will qualify directly and the other 12 will come from the Basketball Champions League qualifying rounds. These teams will be divided into ten groups, seven groups of four teams and three groups of three teams. The two first qualified teams of each group and the four best third-placed teams (two teams from each Conference) will qualify to the regular season phase 2. These teams will be divided into six groups of four teams. The first qualified teams of each group and the best two runners-up of all groups will qualify to the play-offs with the eight teams dropped from the Basketball Champions League regular season.

In the play-offs, the Round of 16 play-offs, the Quarter-Final play-offs, the Semi-Final play-offs and the Final play-offs will be played with a double-leg format.

After the Basketball Champions League expansion, the qualifying rounds were eliminated and the four teams that were going to join them qualified directly to the regular season, being these reduced to 38 teams instead of the 40 initially proposed.

== Team allocation ==
A total of 38 teams will participate in the 2016–17 FIBA Europe Cup.

=== Distribution ===
The table below shows the default access list.

	Teams entering in this round	Teams advancing from previous round	Teams transferred from Champions League
Regular season (38 teams)	26 teams		12 teams from Champions League qualifying rounds
Second round (24 teams)		10 group winners from regular season; 10 group runners-up from regular season; 4 best third-placed teams from regular season (two from each conference)	
Play-offs (16 teams)		6 group winners from the second round; 2 best group runners-up from the second round	8 teams from Champions League regular season

=== Teams ===
The official list of teams was announced with the draw on 22 July.

The labels in the parentheses show how each team qualified for the place of its starting round.

- 2nd, 3rd, 4th, etc.: League position after eventual Playoffs
- CL: Transferred from Champions League
  - RS: Fifth-placed and sixth-placed teams from regular season
  - QR: Losers from qualifying rounds

Play-offs
(Romania) Oradea (CL RS)	(Finland) Kataja (CL RS)	(Turkey) Muratbey Uşak Sportif (CL RS)	(Belgium) Proximus Spirou (CL RS)
(Poland) Stelmet Zielona Góra (CL RS)	(Croatia) Cibona (CL RS)	(Israel) Ironi Nahariya (CL RS)	(Belgium) Telenet Oostende (CL RS)
Regular season
(France) Élan Chalon (5th)	(Turkey) Gaziantep (8th)	(Austria) Redwell Gunners Oberwart (1st)	(Bosnia and Herzegovina) ~~Igokea~~ (CL QR2) (Note: Igokea withdrew from the competition after being dropped from the Basketball Champions League qualifying rounds.)
(France) Gravelines (6th)	(Turkey) Demir İnşaat Büyükçekmece (10th)	(Czech Republic) JIP Pardubice (3rd)	(Netherlands) Donar (CL QR1)
(France) Pau-Lacq-Orthez (7th)	(Lithuania) Vytautas (5th)	(Estonia) TLÜ/Kalev (4th)	(Slovakia) Prievidza (CL QR1)
(France) Nanterre 92 (8th)	(Lithuania) Šiauliai (6th)	(Germany) Telekom Baskets Bonn (11th)	(Bulgaria) Rilski Sportist (CL QR1)
(Belgium) Hubo Limburg United (3rd)	(Israel) Bnei Herzliya (7th)	(Romania) U-BT Cluj-Napoca (CL QR2)	(Cyprus) Petrolina AEK Larnaca (CL QR1)
(Belgium) Brussels (4th) (Note: On 16 September 2016, Brussels Basketball was added to the competition.)	(Russia) Enisey (10th)	(Belarus) Tsmoki Minsk (CL QR2)	
(Belgium) Port of Antwerp Giants (6th)	(Romania) Mureș (2nd)	(Estonia) Tartu (CL QR2)	
(Belgium) Belfius Mons-Hainaut (7th)	(Romania) Steaua CSM EximBank (3rd)	(Bulgaria) Lukoil Academic (CL QR2)	
(Hungary) TLI Alba Fehérvár (2nd)	(Cyprus) APOEL (2nd)	(Sweden) Södertälje Kings (CL QR2)	
(Hungary) Egis Körmend (4th)	(Kosovo) Sigal Prishtina (1st)	(Portugal) Benfica (CL QR2)	
(Hungary) Sopron (6th)	(Kosovo) Peja (2nd)	(Portugal) Porto (CL QR2)	

== Round and draw dates ==
The schedule of the competition is as follows:

Phase	Round	Draw date	First leg	Second leg
Regular season	Matchday 1	22 July 2016	18–19 October 2016	
Regular season	Matchday 2	22 July 2016	25–26 October 2016	
Regular season	Matchday 3	22 July 2016	1–2 November 2016	
Regular season	Matchday 4	22 July 2016	8–9 November 2016	
Regular season	Matchday 5	22 July 2016	15–17 November 2016	
Regular season	Matchday 6	22 July 2016	22–23 November 2016	
Second round	Matchday 1	22 July 2016	14 December 2016	
Second round	Matchday 2	22 July 2016	21 December 2016	
Second round	Matchday 3	22 July 2016	4 January 2017	
Second round	Matchday 4	22 July 2016	11 January 2017	
Second round	Matchday 5	22 July 2016	18 January 2017	
Second round	Matchday 6	22 July 2016	25 January 2017	
Play-offs	Round of 16	26 January 2017	8 February 2017	22 February 2017
Play-offs	Quarter-finals	26 January 2017	8 March 2017	15 March 2017
Play-offs	Semi-finals	26 January 2017	29 March 2017	5 April 2017
Play-offs	Finals	26 January 2017	19 April 2017	26 April 2017

== Regular season ==
Location of teams of the 2016–17 FIBA Europe Cup regular season.
Conference 1: Red: Group A; Yellow: Group B; Green: Group C; Dark Green: Group D; Purple: Group E.
Conference 2: Pink: Group F; Blue: Group G; Orange: Group H; Brown: Group I; Deep pink: Group J.

The draw of the regular season was held on 22 July 2016, at 12:00 CEST, in Freising, Germany. The 38 teams were divided into two conferences according to geographical criteria, each containing five groups:

- Conference 1: Groups A, B and D (four teams); Groups C and E (three teams)
- Conference 2: Groups F, G, H and J (four teams); Group I (three teams)

The matchdays were 19 October, 26 October, 2 November, 9 November, 16 November and 23 November 2016. The top two teams of each group and the four best third-placed teams of all groups (two from each conference) advanced to the second round.

A total of 22 national associations were represented in the regular season. Hubo Limburg United, Basic-Fit Brussels and Peja made their European debut appearances.

=== Tiebreakers ===
If teams in the same group finish tied on points at the end of the Regular Season, tiebreakers were applied in the following order:

1. Head-to-head record.
2. Head-to-head point differential.
3. Point differential during the regular season.
4. Points scored during the regular season.
5. Sum of quotients of points scored and points allowed in each regular season match.

=== Conference 1 ===
==== Group A ====
Pos	Team	Pld	W	L	PF	PA	PD	Pts	Qualification	CHA	ALB	BEN	BRU
1	(France) Élan Chalon	6	4	2	520	492	+28	10	Advance to second round	—	106–77	90–76	78–74
2	(Hungary) Alba Fehérvár	6	4	2	518	493	+25	10	Advance to second round	111–91	—	90–71	86–79
3	(Portugal) Benfica	6	3	3	455	477	−22	9	Advance to second round	77–69	77–74	—	75–80
4	(Belgium) Basic-Fit Brussels	6	1	5	453	484	−31	7		77–86	69–80	74–79	—

Source: FIBA Europe Cup

==== Group B ====
Pos	Team	Pld	W	L	PF	PA	PD	Pts	Qualification	GRA	DON	KOR	LIM
1	(France) Gravelines	6	4	2	480	477	+3	10	Advance to second round	—	71–67	95–76	77–84
2	(Netherlands) Donar	6	4	2	490	456	+34	10	Advance to second round	70–79	—	79–74	98–70
3	(Hungary) Egis Körmend	6	3	3	499	473	+26	9	Advance to second round	85–60	72–79	—	100–85
4	(Belgium) Hubo Limburg United	6	1	5	499	563	−64	7		95–98	90–97	75–92	—

Source: FIBA Europe Cup

==== Group C ====
Pos	Team	Pld	W	L	PF	PA	PD	Pts	Qualification	BON	SOD	MON
1	(Germany) Telekom Baskets Bonn	4	3	1	333	313	+20	7	Advance to second round	—	85–76	77–75
2	(Sweden) Södertälje Kings	4	2	2	323	336	−13	6	Advance to second round	90–89	—	80–68
3	(Belgium) Belfius Mons-Hainaut	4	1	3	309	316	−7	5		72–82	94–77	—

Source: FIBA Europe Cup

==== Group D ====
Pos	Team	Pld	W	L	PF	PA	PD	Pts	Qualification	NAN	ANT	SOP	POR
1	(France) Nanterre 92	6	6	0	513	448	+65	12	Advance to second round	—	90–79	106–75	81–73
2	(Belgium) Port of Antwerp Giants	6	4	2	473	447	+26	10	Advance to second round	69–78	—	88–67	79–72
3	(Hungary) Sopron	6	2	4	443	492	−49	8		77–79	61–71	—	75–72
4	(Portugal) Porto	6	0	6	447	489	−42	6		75–79	79–87	76–88	—

Source: FIBA Europe Cup

==== Group E ====
Pos	Team	Pld	W	L	PF	PA	PD	Pts	Qualification	PAU	OBE	TAR
1	(France) Pau-Lacq-Orthez	4	4	0	339	264	+75	8	Advance to second round	—	92–74	77–56
2	(Austria) Redwell Gunners Oberwart	4	2	2	297	326	−29	6	Advance to second round	66–81	—	79–76
3	(Estonia) Tartu	4	0	4	277	323	−46	4		68–89	77–78	—

Source: FIBA Europe Cup

=== Conference 2 ===
==== Group F ====
Pos	Team	Pld	W	L	PF	PA	PD	Pts	Qualification	LUK	HER	PRI	STE
1	(Bulgaria) Lukoil Academic	6	4	2	509	465	+44	10	Advance to second round	—	78–73	90–75	105–76
2	(Israel) Bnei Herzliya	6	4	2	513	479	+34	10	Advance to second round	84–79	—	89–64	90–85
3	(Slovakia) Prievidza	6	3	3	459	492	−33	9	Advance to second round	81–77	90–85	—	78–69
4	(Romania) Steaua CSM EximBank	6	1	5	471	516	−45	7		76–80	83–92	82–71	—

Source: FIBA Europe Cup

==== Group G ====
Pos	Team	Pld	W	L	PF	PA	PD	Pts	Qualification	GAZ	CLU	LAR	PEJ
1	(Turkey) Gaziantep	6	5	1	474	425	+49	11	Advance to second round	—	72–73	80–72	74–56
2	(Romania) U-BT Cluj-Napoca	6	5	1	465	432	+33	11	Advance to second round	72–79	—	65–63	85–76
3	(Cyprus) Petrolina AEK Larnaca	6	1	5	450	460	−10	7		86–93	66–71	—	81–64
4	(Kosovo) Peja	6	1	5	425	497	−72	7		66–76	76–99	87–82	—

Source: FIBA Europe Cup

==== Group H ====
Pos	Team	Pld	W	L	PF	PA	PD	Pts	Qualification	BUY	ENI	RIL	SIG
1	(Turkey) Demir İnşaat Büyükçekmece	6	4	2	521	445	+76	10	Advance to second round	—	93–77	92–70	100–58
2	(Russia) Enisey	6	4	2	538	527	+11	10	Advance to second round	90–81	—	104–84	102–101
3	(Bulgaria) Rilski Sportist	6	3	3	518	553	−35	9		79–74	81–85	—	100–98
4	(Kosovo) Sigal Prishtina	6	1	5	515	567	−52	7		71–81	87–80	100–104	—

Source: FIBA Europe Cup

==== Group I ====
Pos	Team	Pld	W	L	PF	PA	PD	Pts	Qualification	VYT	MUR	KAL
1	(Lithuania) Vytautas	4	3	1	400	286	+114	7	Advance to second round	—	99–61	104–61
2	(Romania) Mureș	4	3	1	329	334	−5	7	Advance to second round	109–101	—	70–58
3	(Estonia) TLÜ/Kalev	4	0	4	250	359	−109	4		55–96	76–89	—

Source: FIBA Europe Cup

==== Group J ====
Pos	Team	Pld	W	L	PF	PA	PD	Pts	Qualification	TSM	PAR	APO	SIA
1	(Belarus) Tsmoki Minsk	6	5	1	486	443	+43	11	Advance to second round	—	78–82	81–68	86–71
2	(Czech Republic) JIP Pardubice	6	4	2	524	507	+17	10	Advance to second round	75–80	—	80–75	89–85
3	(Cyprus) APOEL	6	3	3	472	462	+10	9	Advance to second round	70–71	99–90	—	76–65
4	(Lithuania) Šiauliai	6	0	6	463	533	−70	6		77–90	90–108	75–84	—

Source: FIBA Europe Cup

=== Ranking of third-placed teams ===
Games against fourth-placed teams are not included in these rankings.

==== Conference 1 ====
Pos	Grp	Team	Pld	W	L	PF	PA	PD	Pts	Qualification
1	A	(Portugal) Benfica	4	2	2	301	323	−22	6	Advance to second round
2	B	(Hungary) Egis Körmend	4	1	3	307	313	−6	5	Advance to second round
3	C	(Belgium) Belfius Mons-Hainaut	4	1	3	309	316	−7	5	
4	E	(Estonia) Tartu	4	0	4	277	323	−46	4	
5	D	(Hungary) Sopron	4	0	4	280	344	−64	4	

Source: FIBA Europe Cup

==== Conference 2 ====
Pos	Grp	Team	Pld	W	L	PF	PA	PD	Pts	Qualification
1	F	(Slovakia) Prievidza	4	2	2	310	341	−31	6	Advance to second round
2	J	(Cyprus) APOEL	4	1	3	312	322	−10	5	Advance to second round
3	H	(Bulgaria) Rilski Sportist	4	1	3	314	355	−41	5	
4	G	(Cyprus) Petrolina AEK Larnaca	4	0	4	287	309	−22	4	
5	I	(Estonia) TLÜ/Kalev	4	0	4	250	359	−109	4	

Source: FIBA Europe Cup

== Second round ==
The matchdays were 14 December, 21 December 2016, 4 January, 11 January, 18 January and 25 January 2017. The six group winners plus the two best second-placed teams qualified directly for the play-offs, where they were joined by eight teams transferred from the Basketball Champions League regular season.

=== Group K ===
Pos	Team	Pld	W	L	PF	PA	PD	Pts	Qualification	CHA	GAZ	SOD	MUR
1	(France) Élan Chalon	6	5	1	531	414	+117	11	Advance to play-offs	—	102–83	74–45	101–65
2	(Turkey) Gaziantep	6	5	1	530	454	+76	11	Advance to play-offs	92–80	—	72–66	100–79
3	(Sweden) Södertälje Kings	6	1	5	390	477	−87	7		63–86	51–93	—	88–68
4	(Romania) Mureș	6	1	5	438	544	−106	7		66–88	76–90	84–77	—

Source: FIBA Europe

=== Group L ===
Pos	Team	Pld	W	L	PF	PA	PD	Pts	Qualification	BUY	ANT	GRA	PRI
1	(Turkey) Demir İnşaat Büyükçekmece	6	5	1	534	467	+67	11	Advance to play-offs	—	81–67	87–77	111–77
2	(Belgium) Port of Antwerp Giants	6	4	2	513	481	+32	10		86–64	—	85–74	111–94
3	(France) Gravelines	6	2	4	497	502	−5	8		85–90	87–74	—	95–98
4	(Slovakia) Prievidza	6	1	5	493	587	−94	7		75–101	81–90	68–79	—

Source: FIBA Europe

=== Group M ===
Pos	Team	Pld	W	L	PF	PA	PD	Pts	Qualification	BON	VYT	OBE	APO
1	(Germany) Telekom Baskets Bonn	6	5	1	517	406	+111	11	Advance to play-offs	—	89–70	96–69	96–58
2	(Lithuania) Vytautas	6	4	2	450	443	+7	10		61–75	—	91–72	68–57
3	(Austria) Redwell Gunners Oberwart	6	2	4	444	504	−60	8		64–83	81–85	—	79–74
4	(Cyprus) APOEL	6	1	5	417	475	−58	7		84–78	69–75	75–79	—

Source: FIBA Europe

=== Group N ===
Pos	Team	Pld	W	L	PF	PA	PD	Pts	Qualification	KOR	NAN	TSM	HER
1	(Hungary) Egis Körmend	6	4	2	520	484	+36	10	Advance to play-offs	—	91–74	90–74	91–88
2	(France) Nanterre 92	6	4	2	519	467	+52	10	Advance to play-offs	87–77	—	94–85	107–71
3	(Belarus) Tsmoki Minsk	6	3	3	504	514	−10	9		91–84	88–82	—	89–76
4	(Israel) Bnei Herzliya	6	1	5	448	526	−78	7		70–87	55–73	88–77	—

Source: FIBA Europe

=== Group O ===
Pos	Team	Pld	W	L	PF	PA	PD	Pts	Qualification	PAU	ALB	CLU	PAR
1	(France) Pau-Lacq-Orthez	6	4	2	520	461	+59	10	Advance to play-offs	—	89–63	103–83	101–66
2	(Hungary) Alba Fehérvár	6	4	2	500	501	−1	10		78–81	—	92–83	84–78
3	(Romania) U-BT Cluj-Napoca	6	2	4	475	491	−16	8		79–69	81–86	—	84–67
4	(Czech Republic) JIP Pardubice	6	2	4	466	508	−42	8		92–77	89–97	74–65	—

Source: FIBA Europe

=== Group P ===
Pos	Team	Pld	W	L	PF	PA	PD	Pts	Qualification	ENI	DON	LUK	BEN
1	(Russia) Enisey	6	5	1	528	447	+81	11	Advance to play-offs	—	67–81	92–71	99–69
2	(Netherlands) Donar	6	4	2	489	488	+1	10		76–84	—	95–89	81–78
3	(Bulgaria) Lukoil Academic	6	3	3	500	485	+15	9		92–97	88–62	—	84–72
4	(Portugal) Benfica	6	0	6	426	523	−97	6		58–89	82–94	67–76	—

Source: FIBA Europe

=== Ranking of second-placed teams ===
Pos	Grp	Team	Pld	W	L	PF	PA	PD	Pts	Qualification
1	K	(Turkey) Gaziantep	6	5	1	530	454	+76	11	Advance to play-offs
2	N	(France) Nanterre 92	6	4	2	519	467	+52	10	Advance to play-offs
3	L	(Belgium) Port of Antwerp Giants	6	4	2	513	481	+32	10	
4	M	(Lithuania) Vytautas	6	4	2	450	443	+7	10	
5	P	(Netherlands) Donar	6	4	2	489	488	+1	10	
6	O	(Hungary) Alba Fehérvár	6	4	2	500	501	−1	10	

Source: FIBA Europe

=== Transfers from Champions League regular season ===
Eight teams from the 2016–17 Basketball Champions League Regular season transfer to the FIBA Europe Cup. These include the worst fifth-placed team, all sixth-placed teams and the two best seventh-placed teams.

Group	Fifth place (1 team)	Sixth place (5 teams)	Seventh place (2 teams)
A		(Israel) Ironi Nahariya	
B		(Romania) Oradea	(Finland) Kataja
C		(Turkey) Muratbey Uşak Sportif	
D	(Belgium) Telenet Oostende	(Croatia) Cibona	
E		(Belgium) Proximus Spirou	(Poland) Stelmet Zielona Góra

== Play-offs ==
Unlike the previous season, every round of the play-offs, including the finals, will be played as two-legged home-and-away ties.

=== Bracket ===
Round of 16
(Russia) Enisey	91	96	187
(Turkey) Büyükçekmece	81	104	185
(Belgium) Telenet Oostende	95	70	165
(France) Pau-Lacq-Orthez	86	72	158
(Poland) Stelmet Zielona Góra	69	83	152
(Croatia) Cibona	81	102	183
(Hungary) Egis Körmend	78	82	160
(France) Élan Chalon	99	82	181
(Romania) Oradea	82	82	164
(Turkey) Muratbey Uşak Sportif	72	108	180
(Belgium) Proximus Spirou	85	78	163
(France) Nanterre 92	84	86	170
(Germany) Telekom Baskets Bonn	91	88	179
(Finland) Kataja	72	84	156
(Israel) Ironi Nahariya	96	65	161
(Turkey) Gaziantep	75	80	155

Quarter-finals
(Russia) Enisey	84	79	163
(Belgium) Telenet Oostende	72	95	167
(Croatia) Cibona	87	78	165
(France) Élan Chalon	85	83	168
(Turkey) Muratbey Uşak Sportif	85	82	167
(France) Nanterre 92	82	110	192
(Germany) Telekom Baskets Bonn	89	80	169
(Israel) Ironi Nahariya	68	90	158

Semi-finals
(Belgium) Telenet Oostende	85	65	150
(France) Élan Chalon	80	83	163
(France) Nanterre 92	76	86	162
(Germany) Telekom Baskets Bonn	77	81	158

Final
(France) Élan Chalon	58	79	137
(France) Nanterre 92	58	82	140

=== Round of 16 ===
The first legs will be played on 8 February, and the second legs will be played on 22 February 2017.

Team 1	Agg.	Team 2	1st leg	2nd leg
Ironi Nahariya (Israel)	161–155	(Turkey) Gaziantep	96–75	65–80
Egis Körmend (Hungary)	160–181	(France) Élan Chalon	78–99	82–82
Telenet Oostende (Belgium)	165–158	(France) Pau-Lacq-Orthez	95–86	70–72
Proximus Spirou (Belgium)	163–170	(France) Nanterre 92	85–84	78–86
Oradea (Romania)	164–180	(Turkey) Muratbey Uşak Sportif	82–72	82–108
Enisey (Russia)	187–185	(Turkey) Demir İnşaat Büyükçekmece	91–81	96–104
Stelmet Zielona Góra (Poland)	152–183	(Croatia) Cibona	69–81	83–102
Telekom Baskets Bonn (Germany)	179–156	(Finland) Kataja	91–72	88–84

=== Quarter-finals ===
The first legs will be played on 8 March, and the second legs will be played on 15 March 2017.

Team 1	Agg.	Team 2	1st leg	2nd leg
Telekom Baskets Bonn (Germany)	169–158	(Israel) Ironi Nahariya	89–68	80–90
Cibona (Croatia)	165–168	(France) Élan Chalon	87–85	78–83
Enisey (Russia)	163–167	(Belgium) Telenet Oostende	84–72	79–95
Muratbey Uşak Sportif (Turkey)	167–192	(France) Nanterre 92	85–82	82–110

=== Semi-finals ===
The first legs will be played on 29 March, and the second legs will be played on 5 April 2017.

Team 1	Agg.	Team 2	1st leg	2nd leg
Nanterre 92 (France)	162–158	(Germany) Telekom Baskets Bonn	76–77	86–81
Telenet Oostende (Belgium)	150–163	(France) Élan Chalon	85–80	65–83

=== Final ===
The first leg will be played on 18 April, and the second leg will be played on 25 April 2017.

Team 1	Agg.	Team 2	1st leg	2nd leg
Élan Chalon (France)	137–140	(France) Nanterre 92	58–58	79–82

== Awards ==
=== Season Awards ===
Award	Player	Club
Most Valuable Player	(United States) Cameron Clark	(France) Élan Chalon
Best Defender	(France) Moustapha Fall	(France) Élan Chalon
Coach of the Year	(France) Pascal Donnadieu	(France) Nanterre 92

=== All-FIBA Europe Cup Team ===
Pos.	Player	Team
PG	(United States) Chris Warren	(France) Nanterre 92
SG	(United States) John Roberson	(France) Élan Chalon
SF	(United States) Cameron Clark	(France) Élan Chalon
PF	(United States Virgin Islands) Frank Elegar	(Russia) Enisey
C	(France) Moustapha Fall	(France) Élan Chalon

== Honors ==
=== Top performers ===
Each week a selection of five top performers was made, based on their efficiency rating. The Top Performer title is handed out by the official website of the FIBA Europe Cup and partly decided by efficiency rating in the particular round.

==== Regular season ====
Round	Player	Team	EFF	Ref.
1	(United States) Marcus Denmon	(Turkey) Gaziantep	34	
2	(Bulgaria) Yordan Bozov	(Bulgaria) Rilski Sportist	35	
3	(United States) Seth Tuttle	(Belgium) Hubo Limburg United	36	
4	(United States) Terry Allen	(Hungary) Egis Körmend	38	
5	(United States) Chase Fieler	(Netherlands) Donar	46	
6	(Lithuania) Martynas Echodas	(Lithuania) Šiauliai	37	

==== Second round ====
Round	Player	Team	EFF	Ref.
1	(Zimbabwe) Vitalis Chikoko	(France) Pau-Lacq-Orthez	40	
2	(United States) Kenneth Horton	(Germany) Telekom Baskets Bonn	33	
3	(United States) Mike Smith	(Belgium) Port of Antwerp Giants	31	
4	(United States) Stephen Zack	(Bulgaria) Lukoil Academic	35	
5	(United States) Danny Gibson	(Bulgaria) Lukoil Academic	33	
6	(United States) Marcus Denmon (2)	(Turkey) Gaziantep	32	
6	(United States) Brandon Mobley	(Cyprus) APOEL	32	

==== Round of 16 ====
Player	Team	Ref.
(Greece) Zach Auguste	(Turkey) Muratbey Uşak Sportif	
(Lithuania) Šarūnas Vasiliauskas	(Turkey) Muratbey Uşak Sportif	

==== Quarter-finals ====
Player	Team	Ref.
(United States) Julian Gamble	(Germany) Telekom Baskets Bonn	

==== Semi-finals ====
Player	Team	Ref.
(United States) Cameron Clark	(France) Élan Chalon	

==== Final ====
Player	Team	Ref.
(France) Moustapha Fall	(France) Élan Chalon	

== Statistics ==
=== Statistical leaders ===
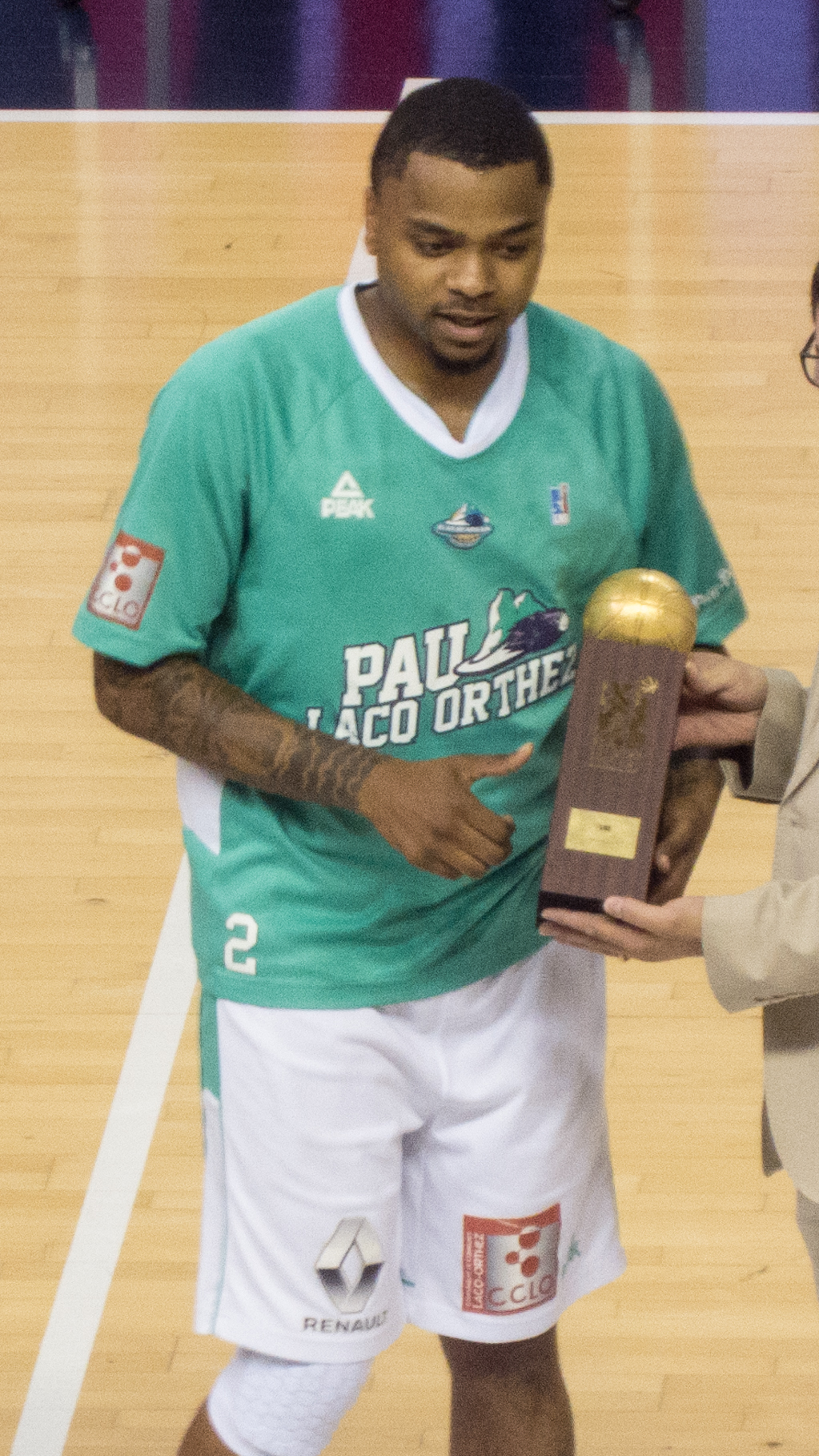
D.J. Cooper

Category	Player	Team	Average
Efficiency	(United States Virgin Islands) Frank Elegar	(Russia) Enisey	23.8
Points	(United States) Cameron Clark	(France) Élan Chalon	20.0
Rebounds	(United States Virgin Islands) Frank Elegar	(Russia) Enisey	10.2
Assists	(United States) D.J. Cooper	(France) Élan Béarnais Pau-Orthez	9.2
Steals	(United States) Christian Tuck,	(Sweden) Södertälje Kings	2.6
Blocks	(France) Moustapha Fall	(France) Élan Chalon	1.8
Turnovers	(Sweden) Thomas Massamba	(Sweden) Södertälje Kings	3.5
Fouls	(United States) Brandon Mobley	(Cyprus) APOEL	3.6
Minutes	(United States) Dru Joyce	(Belarus) Tsmoki-Minsk	37.2
FG%	(United States Virgin Islands) Frank Elegar	(Russia) Enisey	.669
3P%	(Ukraine) Maksym Korniyenko	(Bulgaria) Lukoil Academic	.576
FT%	(Georgia (country)) Taurean Green	(Israel) Bnei Herzliya	.913
Double-doubles	(United States Virgin Islands) Frank Elegar	(Russia) Enisey	8

Source: FIBA Europe Cup

=== Individual game highs ===
Category	Player	Team	Statistic
Points	(United States) John Roberson	(France) Élan Chalon	39
Points	(United States) Spencer Butterfield	(France) Nanterre 92	39
Rebounds	(United States) Dave Dudzinski	(Romania) Steaua CSM EximBank	17
Assists	(United States) Dru Joyce	(Belarus) Tsmoki Minsk	17
Steals	7 occasions		6
Blocks	(Serbia) Đorđe Gagić	(Belarus) Tsmoki Minsk	5
Three pointers	(United States) Spencer Butterfield	(France) Nanterre 92	11
Turnovers	(United States) Derek Jackson, Jr.	(Austria) Gunners Oberwart	9
Turnovers	(Czech Republic) Radek Nečas	(Czech Republic) JIP Pardubice	9

Source: tab=player_high FIBA Europe Cup

== Finals rosters ==
(France) Nanterre 92: Spencer Butterfield, Chris Warren, Heiko Schaffartzik (C), Hugo Invernizzi. Coach: Pascal Donnadieu
(France) Elan Chalon: Cameron Clark, Moustapha Fall, John Robertson, Jérémy Nzeulie, Lance Harris, Bouteille.

== See also ==
- 2016–17 EuroLeague
- 2016–17 EuroCup Basketball
- 2016–17 Basketball Champions League
