= Abdoulaye Loum =

French basketball player

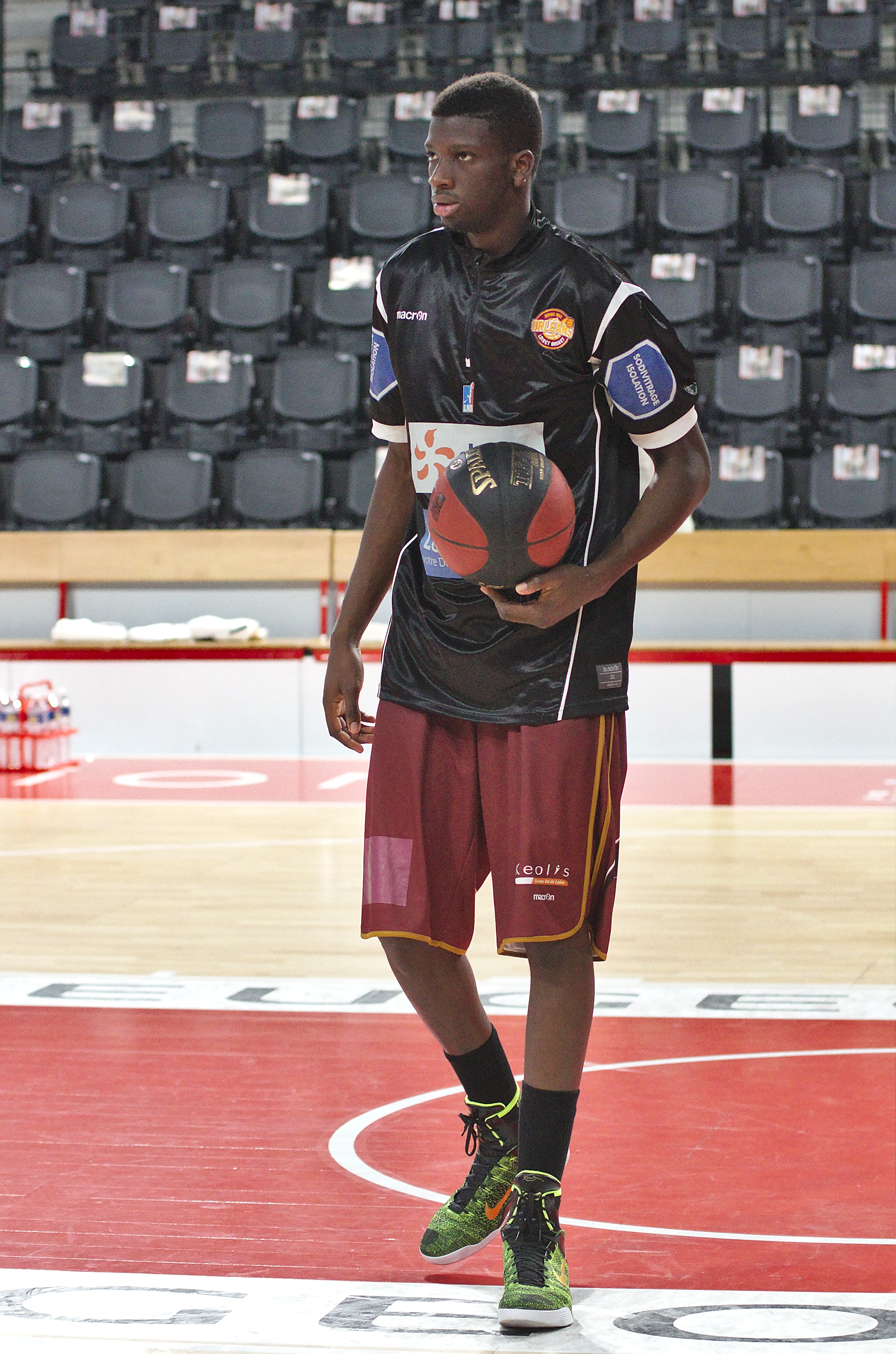

No. 21 – Olympique Antibes
- Position: Power forward
- League: LNB Pro B

Personal information
- Born: 3 April 1991 (age 35) Mont-de-Marsan, France
- Listed height: 2.09 m (6 ft 10 in)

Career information
- NBA draft: 2013: undrafted
- Playing career: 2011–present

Career history
- 2011–2012: STB Le Havre
- 2011–2012: BCM Gravelines
- 2013: SOMB Boulogne-sur-Mer
- 2013–2016: Orléans Loiret Basket
- 2016: SOMB Boulogne-sur-Mer
- 2016–2017: Élan Chalon
- 2017–2023: JDA Dijon
- 2023–2024: Metropolitans 92
- 2024–present: Olympique Antibes

Career highlights
- French League champion (2017); LNB Leaders Cup (2020)

Abdoulaye Loum (born 3 April 1991) is a French professional basketball player for Olympique Antibes of the LNB Pro B. After averaging 4.9 points per game during the 2019-20 season, he was re-signed with the club on 25 May 2020.
