= Palais des Sports Maurice Thorez =

Indoor sports arena

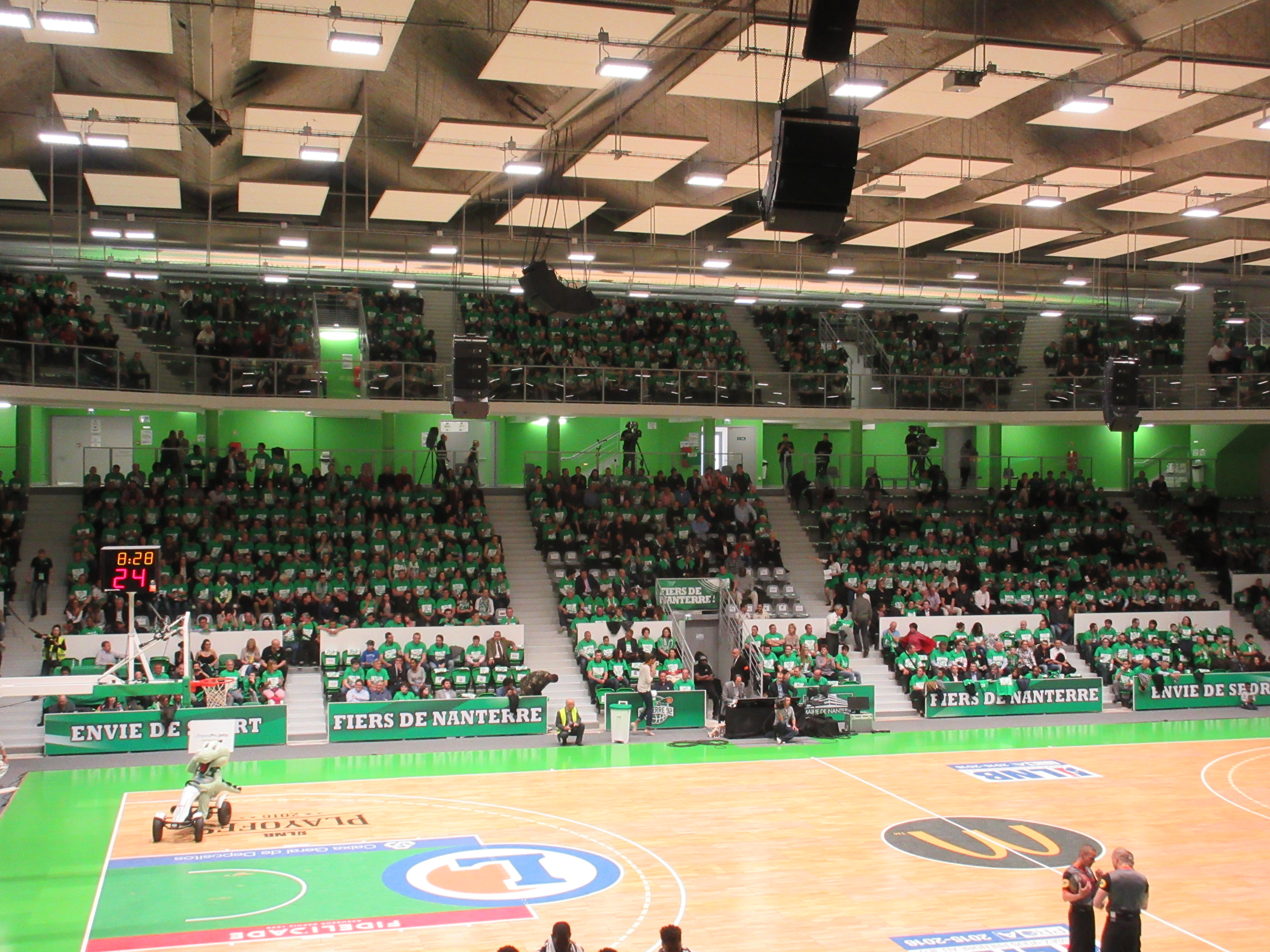
- Inside view of the Palais des Sports in 2016
- Interactive map of Palais des Sports Maurice Thorez
- Location: Nanterre, Hauts-de-Seine, France
- Coordinates: 48.8927441°N 2.2103631°E
- Capacity: Basketball: 3,000
- Surface: Parquet

Construction
- Renovated: 2015
- Expanded: 2015

Tenant
- Nanterre 92 (Basketball)

Palais des Sports Maurice Thorez, or Palais des Sports de Nanterre, is an indoor sporting arena that is located in Nanterre, Hauts-de-Seine, France, near Paris. The arena is named after former minister Maurice Thorez. The capacity of the arena for basketball games is 3,000. It is the home arena of the French League basketball club Nanterre 92 for French national domestic league games and also for EuroCup and Champions League games.

== History ==
The arena's original seating capacity of 1,594 for basketball games was increased to 3,000 with a €5 million construction works and updates renovation project that was completed in 2015. The renovation project was approved in order for the arena to meet the arena standards of the top tier French Pro A League, and the seating capacity requirements of Europe's second tier level basketball competition, the EuroCup. The newly updated and expanded arena, scheduled to be re-opened in September 2015, was finally re-opened in October 2015. The Palace was one of the two venues of the 2017 FIBA Europe Cup Final.
