= Spencer Butterfield =

American basketball player

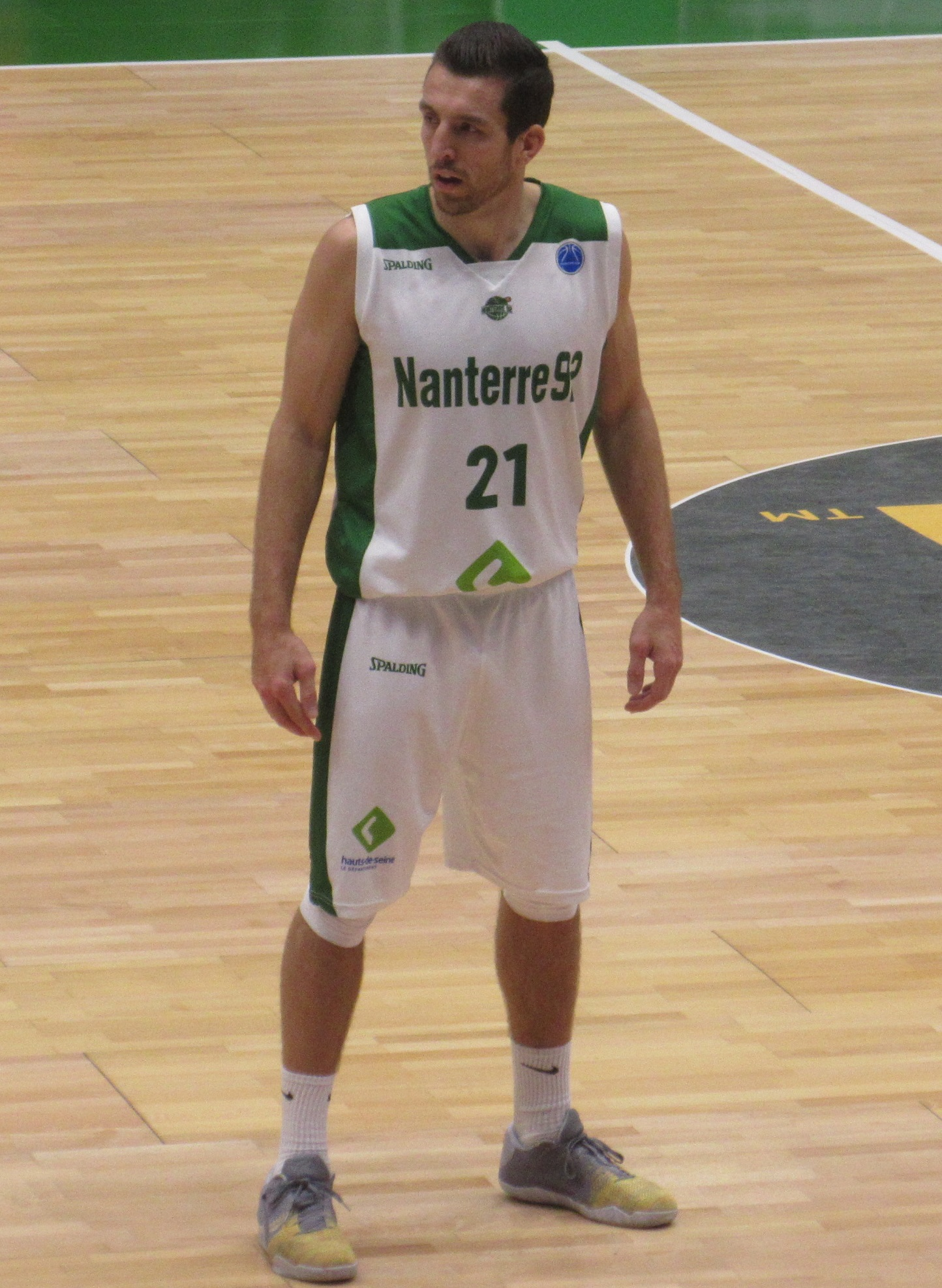
- Butterfield with Nanterre 92 in 2017

Free Agent
- Position: Shooting guard

Personal information
- Born: October 11, 1992 (age 34) Provo, Utah
- Listed height: 6 ft 4 in (1.93 m)
- Listed weight: 205 lb (93 kg)

Career information
- High school: Del Oro (Loomis, California)
- College: Yuba College (2010–2012); Utah State (2012–2014)
- NBA draft: 2014: undrafted
- Playing career: 2014–present

Career history
- 2014–2015: Melilla
- 2015–2016: Juventus
- 2016–2017: Nanterre 92
- 2017–2018: Alba Berlin
- 2018–2019: Pallacanestro Reggiana
- 2019–2020: Nanterre 92
- 2020–2021: Iberostar Tenerife
- 2022–2024: Antwerp Giants

Career highlights
- FIBA Europe Cup champion (2017); Belgian Cup winner (2023); Belgian Cup MVP (2023); French Cup champion (2017); Pro A All-Star (2017); All-LKL Team (2016); FIBA Europe Cup records: Most three-point field goals in a game (11)

Spencer Darren Butterfield (born October 11, 1992) is an American professional basketball player who last played for Telenet Giants Antwerp of the BNXT League. In 2017 he won the FIBA Europe Cup Championship with Nanterre 92.

== Professional career ==
On March 14, 2017, Butterfield set a new FIBA Europe Cup record when he scored 11 three-point field goals in a 110–82 win against Usak Sportif. He also tied the scoring record by scoring 39 points. In April, he won the FIBA Europe Cup title after beating Élan Chalon in the Finals. On Tuesday July 25, 2017, ALBA Berlin announced that it had signed Butterfield to a one-year contract.

On July 27, 2018, Butterfield signed a two-year deal with the Italian club Pallacanestro Reggiana.

For the 2019–20 season, Butterfield re-signed with Nanterre 92. He averaged 10.6 points, 3.6 rebounds and 1.6 assists per game. On October 8, 2020, Butterfield signed with Iberostar Tenerife of the Liga ACB.

On November 5, 2022, he signed with Telenet Giants Antwerp of the Belgian BNXT League. On 12 March 2023, Butterfield and the Giants won the Belgian Cup after beating BC Oostende in the final. He scored a shared team-high 18 points in the final and was named the Belgian Cup Final MVP after the game.
