= Chris Warren (basketball, born 1988) =

American basketball player (born 1988)

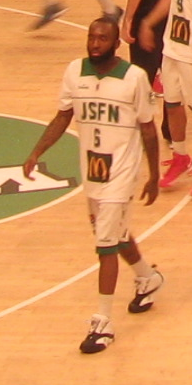

No. 6 – Çağdaş Bodrumspor
- Position: Point guard
- League: Basketbol Süper Ligi

Personal information
- Born: October 22, 1988 (age 37) Orlando, Florida, U.S.
- Listed height: 5 ft 10 in (1.78 m)
- Listed weight: 168 lb (76 kg)

Career information
- High school: Dr. Phillips (Orlando, Florida)
- College: Ole Miss (2007–2011)
- NBA draft: 2011: undrafted
- Playing career: 2011–present

Career history
- 2011–2012: Adelaide 36ers
- 2012–2013: JSF Nanterre
- 2013–2015: Uşak Sportif
- 2015: AEK Athens
- 2015–2016: Yeşilgiresun Belediye
- 2016–2017: Nanterre 92
- 2017: Bahçeşehir Koleji
- 2018–2019: Eisbären Bremerhaven
- 2019–2020: Ormanspor
- 2020–2021: Nanterre 92
- 2021–2022: Orléans Loiret Basket
- 2022–present: Çağdaş Bodrumspor

Career highlights
- FIBA Europe Cup champion (2017); French Cup winner (2017); LNB Pro A champion (2013); First-team All-SEC (2011); Second-team All-SEC (2010); SEC All-Freshmen Team (2008)

Christopher Tirrell Warren (born October 22, 1988) is an American professional basketball player for Çağdaş Bodrumspor of the Basketbol Süper Ligi. He played college basketball for the University of Mississippi.

== Early life ==
Warren was born in Orlando, Florida, and graduated from Dr. Phillips High School in Orlando. Warren held 20 different records for the Dr. Phillips Panthers basketball team. His number 3 is now retired and is a Dr. Phillips Hall of Fame inductee.

== College career ==
Warren attended the University of Mississippi from 2007, until graduating in 2011. He played for the Ole Miss Rebels men's basketball team, and started 114 out of his 115 games that he in played for the Rebels. The only game he did not start was on Senior Day, during his freshman year. Despite his short stature, Warren excelled for the Rebels, with his speed around the court, and his outside game troubling opponents in his four years of college ball.

Warren's list of achievements while playing for Ole Miss in the Southeastern Conference (SEC) read as follows:

- SEC Points Per Game: All time 2nd (17.5)
- Ole Miss Rebels Points Per Game: All time 1st
- SEC Field Goal Attempts: All time 3rd (1,563)
- Ole Miss Rebels Field Goal Attempts: All time 1st
- SEC Field Goals Made: All time 10th (634)
- Ole Miss Rebels Field Goals Made: All time 2nd
- SEC 3pt Attempts: All time 2nd (900)
- Ole Miss Rebels 3pt Attempts: All time 1st
- SEC 3pt Made: All time 3rd (334)
- Ole Miss Rebels 3pt Made: All time 1st
- SEC & Ole Miss Rebels Free Throw Percentage: All time 1st (86%)
- Ole Miss Rebels Assists: All time 1st (452)

== Professional career ==
After graduating from Ole Miss, Warren was signed as an import player for the Adelaide 36ers of the Australian League's 2011–12 NBL season. After a string of failed import guards in the preceding seasons, Warren was a good find for the struggling 36ers. With Adelaide finishing in 9th place in the Australian NBL League, Warren played in 28 games for the team, and averaged 14.2 points, 3.2 assists, 2.3 rebounds, and 0.8 steals per game, in 31.5 minutes per game. With his 14.2 points per game scoring average, he was second for the 36ers in scoring, behind centre Daniel Johnson.

On September 18, 2012, Warren signed with JSF Nanterre for the 2012–13 season. He was a French champion with Nanterre, winning the 2012–13 LNB Pro A season.

On July 9, 2013, Warren signed a one-year deal with Uşak Sportif of Turkey. On June 10, 2014, he re-signed with Uşak for one more season.

On August 8, 2015, Warren signed with Greek club AEK Athens. On November 27, 2015, he parted ways with AEK. He then signed with Turkish club Yeşilgiresun Belediye for the rest of the 2015–16 Turkish Basketball Super League season.

On August 3, 2016, Warren returned to Nanterre for the 2016–17 season.

On June 29, 2017, Warren signed with Turkish club Bahçeşehir Koleji.

On July 10, 2019, Warren signed with OGM Ormanspor for the 2019–20 season.

On May 29, 2020, he has signed and returned a third time to Nanterre 92 of the LNB Pro A.

On August 31, 2021, he has signed with Orléans Loiret Basket of the LNB Pro A.
