= Le Colisée =

Indoor arena in Chalon-sur-Saône, France

Coordinates: 46.786632°N 4.865334°E

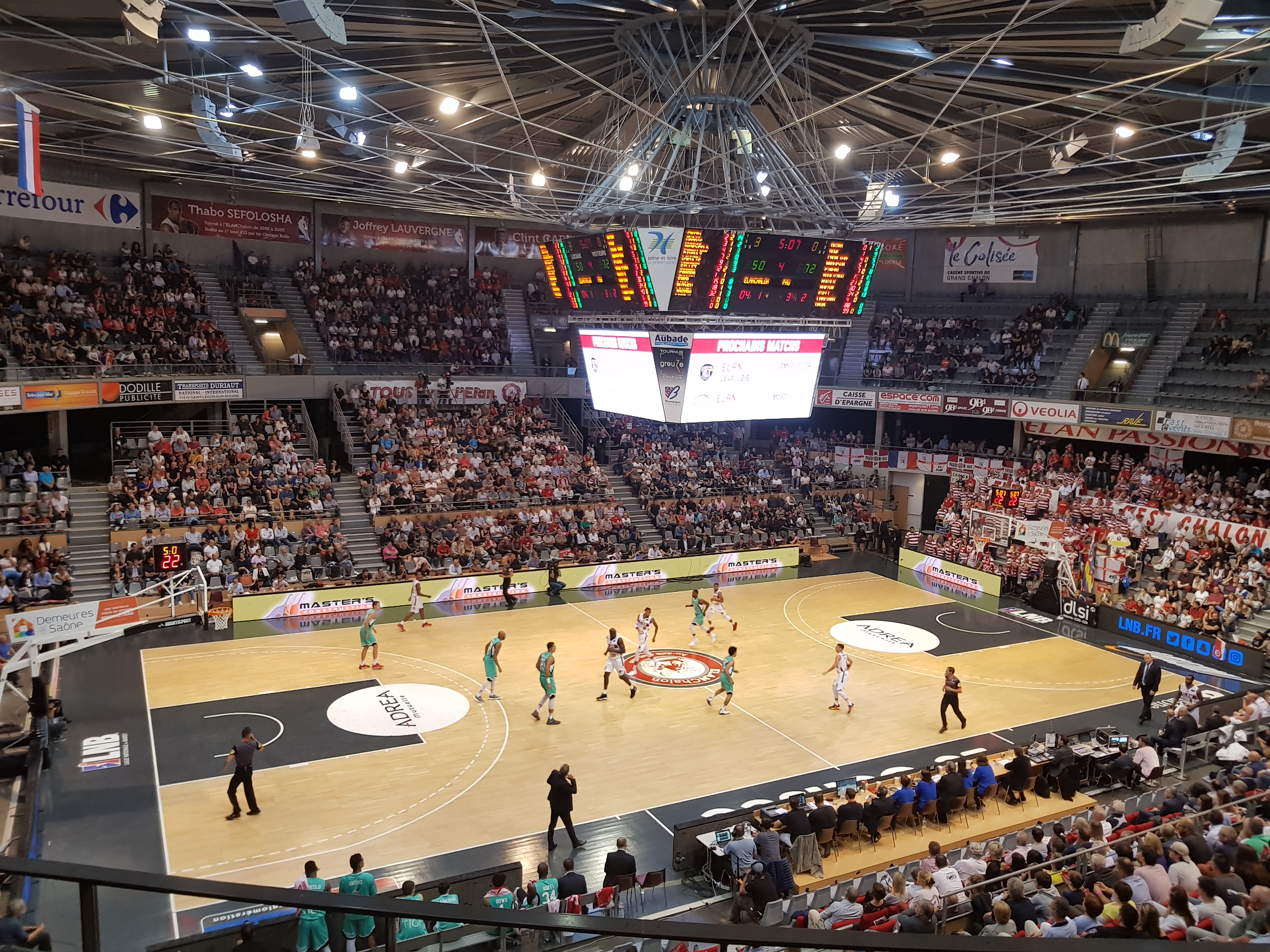
- An Élan Chalon home game in 2017.
- Interactive map of Le Colisée
- Location: 1 Rue d'Amsterdam; 71100 Chalon-sur-Saône
- Capacity: Basketball: 5,000
- Surface: Parquet Floor

Construction
- Opened: 2001
- Architect: Jean Guervilly

Tenant
- Élan Chalon (2001–present)

Le Colisée is an indoor arena in Chalon-sur-Saône, France. It is primarily used for basketball games, and it is the home arena of the French Pro A League club Élan Chalon. The arena seats 5,000 people.

== History ==
The hall was inaugurated on September 29, 2001 for a match between Chalon and Nancy. In its first year, the Colisée welcomed over 100,000 spectators. Élan Chalon averaged 4,000 spectators per game in Pro A, the only venue to achieve 100% occupancy from 2001 to 2007.

In 2016, the 2016 FIBA Europe Cup Final Four was held at the Le Colisée, with Élan Chalon functioning as the hosts.
