= John Roberson =

American basketball player

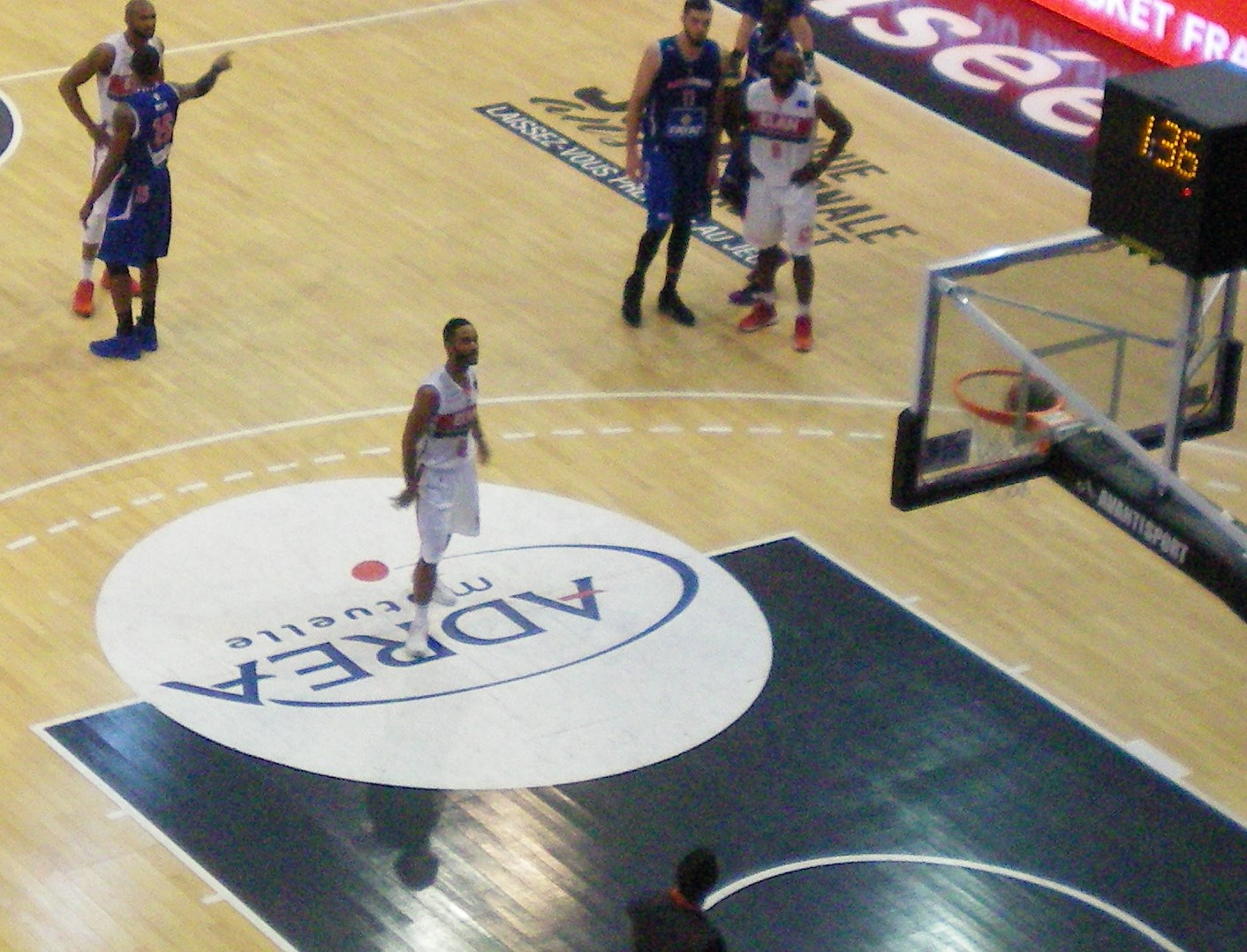

Al Ahly
- Position: Point guard
- League: Egyptian Basketball Premier League

Personal information
- Born: October 28, 1988 (age 38) Kansas City, Kansas, U.S.
- Listed height: 180 cm (5 ft 11 in)
- Listed weight: 78 kg (172 lb)

Career information
- High school: Plano (Plano, Texas)
- College: Texas Tech (2007–2011)
- NBA draft: 2011: undrafted
- Playing career: 2011–present

Career history
- 2011: Zlatorog Laško
- 2011–2012: South Carolina Warriors
- 2012: Comunikt
- 2012: Monthey
- 2012–2014: Södertälje Kings
- 2014: Atomerőmű SE
- 2014–2015: Södertälje Kings
- 2015–2017: Élan Chalon
- 2017–2018: ASVEL
- 2018–2019: Enisey
- 2019–2020: South East Melbourne Phoenix
- 2020: Galatasaray
- 2020–2021: Estudiantes
- 2021–2022: SIG Strasbourg
- 2022–2024: Manisa BB
- 2024–present: Al Ahly

Career highlights
- French League champion (2017); LNB All-Star (2017); LNB All-Star Game MVP (2017); Basketligan MVP (2015); 2× Basketligan Finals MVP (2013, 2015); 3× Basketligan champion (2013–2015); Texas Mr. Basketball (2007)

John Daniel Roberson (born October 28, 1988) is an American-born naturalized Bosnian professional basketball player who plays for Al Ahly of the Egyptian Basketball Premier League. Standing at 5 ft 11 in (1.80 m), he plays at the point guard position.

== Professional career ==
In June 2015, Roberson signed with Élan Chalon. After his first season, Roberson extended his contract until 2017. On March 8, 2017, Roberson set a new FIBA Europe Cup scoring record with 39 points in an 87–85 loss against Cibona. Roberson also set the league record for most three-point field goals in a game, with 10 three-point field goals. With Chalon he won the French League's 2016–17 season championship.

On June 27, 2017, Roberson signed a two-year contract with the French team ASVEL.

On July 17, 2018, Roberson signed with the Russian team Enisey of the VTB United League.

On July 16, 2019, Roberson signed with the South East Melbourne Phoenix of the Australian National Basketball League (NBL) for the 2019–20 season. He averaged 20.2 points and 5.5 rebounds per game. His 112 three-point field goals made during the season set an NBL record for the 40-minute era.

On February 5, 2020, Roberson signed with Galatasaray Doğa Sigorta of the Basketbol Süper Ligi (BSL).

On July 14, 2020, Roberson signed with CB Estudiantes of the Liga ACB.

On August 20, 2021, he has signed with SIG Strasbourg of the French LNB Pro A.

On June 30, 2022, he signed with Manisa BB of the Turkish Basketbol Süper Ligi.

In September 2024, Roberson joined Al Ahly of the Egyptian Basketball Premier League.
