= Jérémy Nzeulie =

French-born Cameroonian basketball player

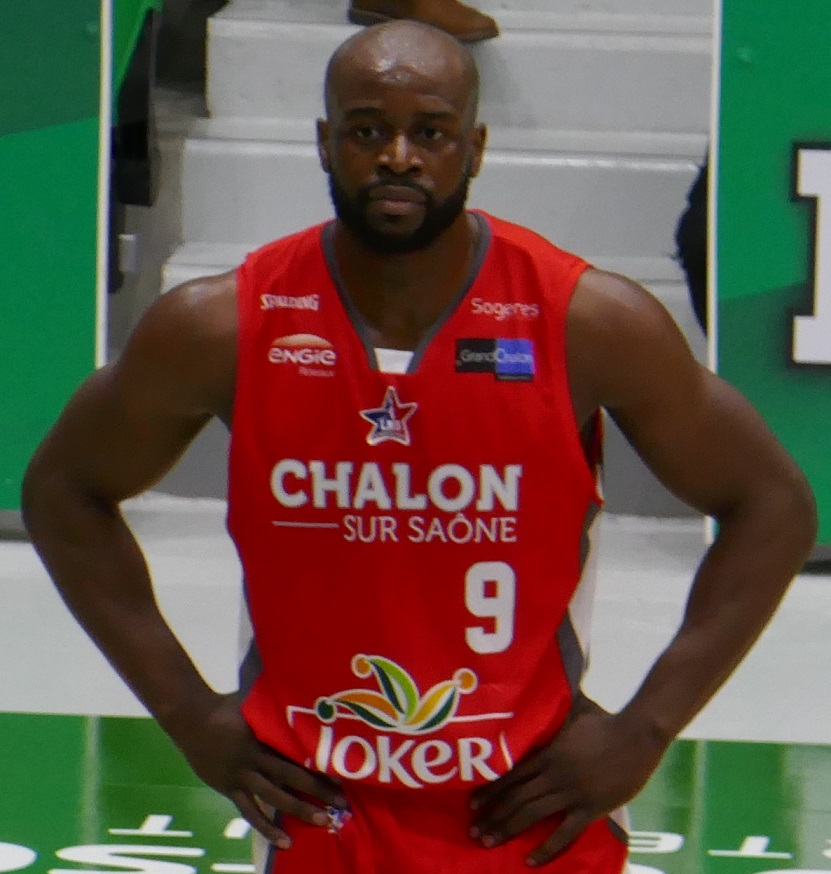
- Nzeulie with Chalon, 2017

Free Agent
- Position: Shooting guard / point guard

Personal information
- Born: 15 February 1991 (age 35) Choisy-le-Roi, France
- Listed height: 6 ft 2 in (1.88 m)
- Listed weight: 196 lb (89 kg)

Career information
- NBA draft: 2013: undrafted
- Playing career: 2008–present

Career history
- 2008–2011: Nanterre
- 2011–2012: Bordeaux
- 2012–2016: Nanterre
- 2016–2018: Élan Chalon
- 2018–2021: SIG Strasbourg
- 2021: Boulazac Basket Dordogne
- 2021–2022: Orléans Loiret
- 2022–2023: Saint-Quentin
- 2024: Kadji Sports Academy

Career highlights
- Leaders Cup winner (2019); 2x French League champion (2013, 2017); Pro A Finals MVP (2017); EuroChallenge champion (2015); French Cup champion (2014); Match des Champions champion (2014)

Jeremy Nzeulie (born 15 February 1991) is a French-born Cameroonian basketball player.

== Professional career ==
He made his French league Pro-A debut for club Nanterre during the 2008–2009 season. He spent one season with JSA Bordeaux and then returned to JSF Nanterre.

After the 2015–16 season, Nzeulie signed a two-year deal with Élan Chalon. In the 2016–17 season, Nzeulie won his second Pro A title after Chalon beat SIG Strasbourg 3–2 in the Finals. Nzeulie was named the Pro A Finals MVP.

In July 2018, Nzeulie signed a two-year contract with SIG Strasbourg.

On 21 January 2021 he signed with Boulazac Basket Dordogne of the LNB Pro A.

On 25 September 2021 Nzeulie signed with Orléans Loiret Basket. He signed a contract until the end of the season on 25 January 2022.

== International career ==
Nzeulie represents his country by playing for the Cameroon national basketball team. He played at AfroBasket 2013 and 2015 with Cameroon.
