= Élan Chalon =

French basketball club

- Leagues: LNB Élite; Europe Cup
- Founded: 1955; 71 years ago
- Arena: Le Colisée
- Capacity: 4,540
- Location: Chalon-sur-Saône, France
- Team colors: Red, White, Silver
- President: Vincent Bergeret
- Head coach: Elric Delord
- Team captain: Jeremiah Hill
- Championships: 2 French Championship; 2 French Cup; 1 Semaine des As Cup
- Website: elanchalon.com
| Home | Away | Third |

Élan Sportif Chalonnais, commonly known as Élan Chalon, is a French professional basketball club based in Chalon-sur-Saône. The team currently plays in the LNB Élite, the highest tier of basketball in France. Chalon's main colors are red and white, and their mascot is a moose. The team's home arena is called Le Colisée, which seats 4,540 spectators.

Founded in 1927, the club has traditionally been playing in the Pro C. In the 2009–10 Pro A season, the club captured its first domestic championship by winning the Final against Le Mans. In 2012, Élan won its second domestic title. The club has also been a regular in European competitions, as the team has been runners-up in three different FIBA competitions.

== History ==
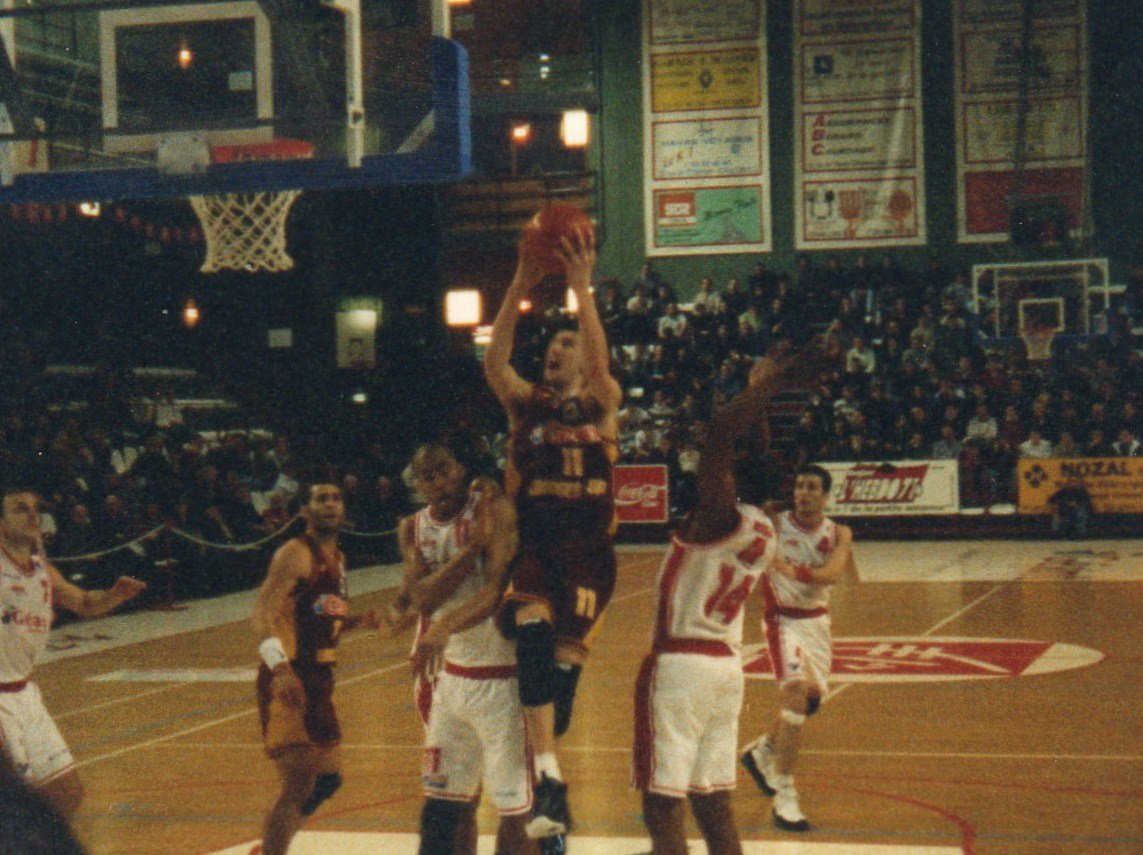
Chalon playing Limoges in March 1996

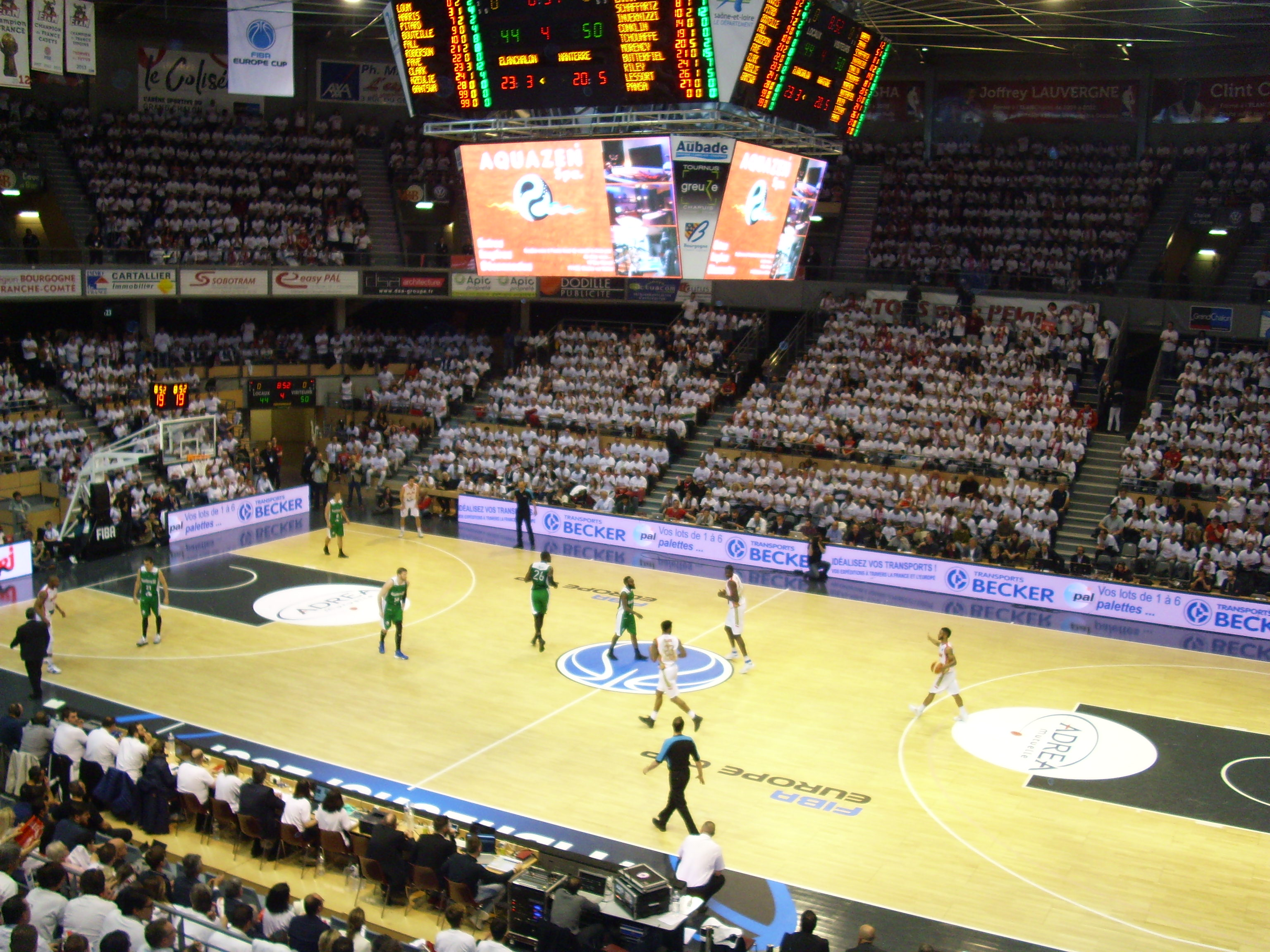
Le Colisée during the 2017 FIBA Europe Cup Final

The club was founded in 1955, after the merger of Association Sportive Chalonnaise and Élan de Saint-Jean des Vignes. The club then merged with the football club Bourgneuf Val d'Or Mercurey of Bourgneuf Mercurey in 1970. The club reached full professional status in 1994.

In the 2011–12 season, Chalon won the LNB Pro A title which meant they had won their first ever French championship. Élan Chalon won the Final of the league 95–76 over Le Mans Sarthe Basket. Billy Ouattara and Clint Capela, respectively 24 points and 22 points, led the team to the win in the Final.

In the 2012–13 season, Élan played its first Euroleague season in history: the club was eliminated after the regular seasons in which the club recorded 3 wins and 7 losses.

In the 2016, Chalon reached the Final Four of the FIBA Europe Cup. The club hosted the Final Four at Le Colisée and ended on the third place after beating Russian side Enisey in the third-place game.

The following 2016–17 season was another successful one for the club. Élan reached one further stage of the FIBA Europe Cup Final this time, by reaching the Final. In the double-legged Final, Chalon lost to other French side Nanterre 92. In the Pro, A the club captured its second national title after defeating SIG Strasbourg 3–2 in the Finals.

== Logos ==
2007–2013

2013–2018

== Players ==
=== Current roster ===
Note: Flags indicate national team eligibility at FIBA-sanctioned events. Players may hold other non-FIBA nationalities not displayed.

Élan Chalon roster
Players
Coaches

| Pos. | No. | Nat. | Name | Ht. | Age |
|---|---|---|---|---|---|
| F/C | 00 | (France) | Kouakou-Heugue, Noa | 2.09 m (6 ft 10 in) | 19 – 28 April 2007 |
| PG | 1 | (France) | Nadolny, Clarence | 1.91 m (6 ft 3 in) | 25 – 3 October 2000 |
| SF | 3 | (Canada) | Uguak, Aher | 2.00 m (6 ft 7 in) | 28 – 24 May 1998 |
| SG | 7 | (United States) | Dunn, Damian | 1.92 m (6 ft 4 in) | 25 – 1 January 2001 |
| SG | 8 | (Cameroon) | Hill, Jeremiah (C) | 1.88 m (6 ft 2 in) | 31 – 4 September 1995 |
| SF | 10 | (Switzerland) | Riethauser, Klark | 2.01 m (6 ft 7 in) | 18 – 29 March 2008 |
| PG | 20 | (France) | Leray, Mathéo | 1.90 m (6 ft 3 in) | 23 – 25 March 2003 |
| SG | 21 | (United States) | Grandison, Jacob | 1.98 m (6 ft 6 in) | 28 – 2 April 1998 |
| F/C | 22 | (France) | Tonnellier, Yanis | 2.04 m (6 ft 8 in) | 22 – 4 February 2004 |
| C | 33 | (United States) | Golden, Grant | 2.08 m (6 ft 10 in) | 28 – 15 January 1998 |
| SF | 41 | (United States) | Horne, Jeriah | 2.00 m (6 ft 7 in) | 28 – 9 April 1998 |
| PF | 42 | (France) | Ponsar, Carl | 2.03 m (6 ft 8 in) | 29 – 2 April 1997 |

Head coach

- (France) Elric Delord

Assistant coach(es)

- (France) Romain Zwicky
- (France) Xavier Millet Catalan

Legend

- (C) Team captain
- Injured

- Roster
Updated: September 30, 2026

=== Notable players ===
Note: Flags indicate national team eligibility at FIBA-sanctioned events. Players may hold other non-FIBA nationalities not displayed.

Criteria

To appear in this section a player must have either:

- Set a club record or won an individual award while at the club
- Played at least one official international match for their national team at any time
- Played at least one official NBA match at any time.

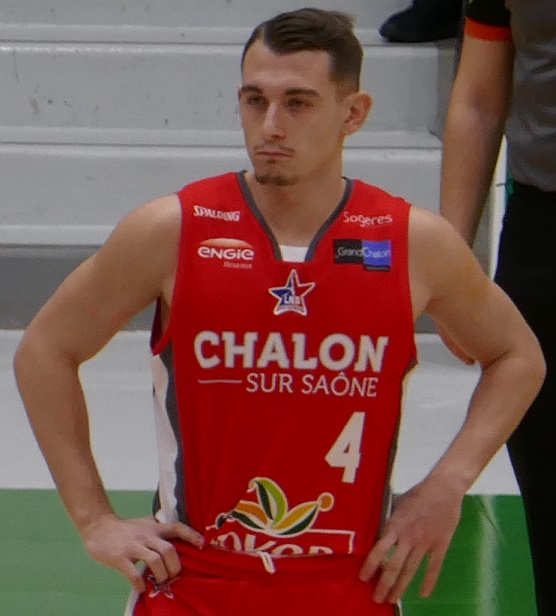
Arthur Rozenfeld

- (France) (Israel) Frédéric Bourdillon
- (France) Mamoutou Diarra
- (France) (Bulgaria) Ilian Evtimov
- (France) Moustapha Fall
- (France) David Michineau
- (France) Jérémy Nzeulie
- (France) Stéphane Ostrowski
- (France) (Israel) Arthur Rozenfeld
- (France) Steed Tchicamboud
- (The Bahamas) Trevor Harvey
- (Cameroon) Jérémy Nzeulie
- (Canada) Rowan Barrett
- (Dominica) Garth Joseph
- (Israel) Rafael "Rafi" Menco
- (Israel) Uri Cohen-Mintz
- (Latvia) Mareks Mejeris
- (Lithuania) Rimas Kurtinaitis
- (Lithuania) Einaras Tubutis
- (North Macedonia) Slobodan Šljivančanin
- (Nigeria) Alade Aminu
- (Poland) (United States) A. J. Slaughter
- (Switzerland) Clint Capela
- (Switzerland) (Canada) Kyshawn George
- (Switzerland) Thabo Sefolosha
- (United States) John Best
- (United States) Devin Booker
- (United States) Cameron Clark
- (United States) Corey Crowder
- (United States) Malcolm Delaney
- (United States) Marcus Denmon
- (United States) Keith Gatlin
- (United States) Udonis Haslem
- (United States) Will McDonald
- (United States) Tracy Murray
- (United States) Charles Pittman
- (United States) John Roberson
- (United States) Shawnta Rogers
- (United States) (Czech Republic) Blake Schilb
- (United States) Shelden Williams

== Honours ==
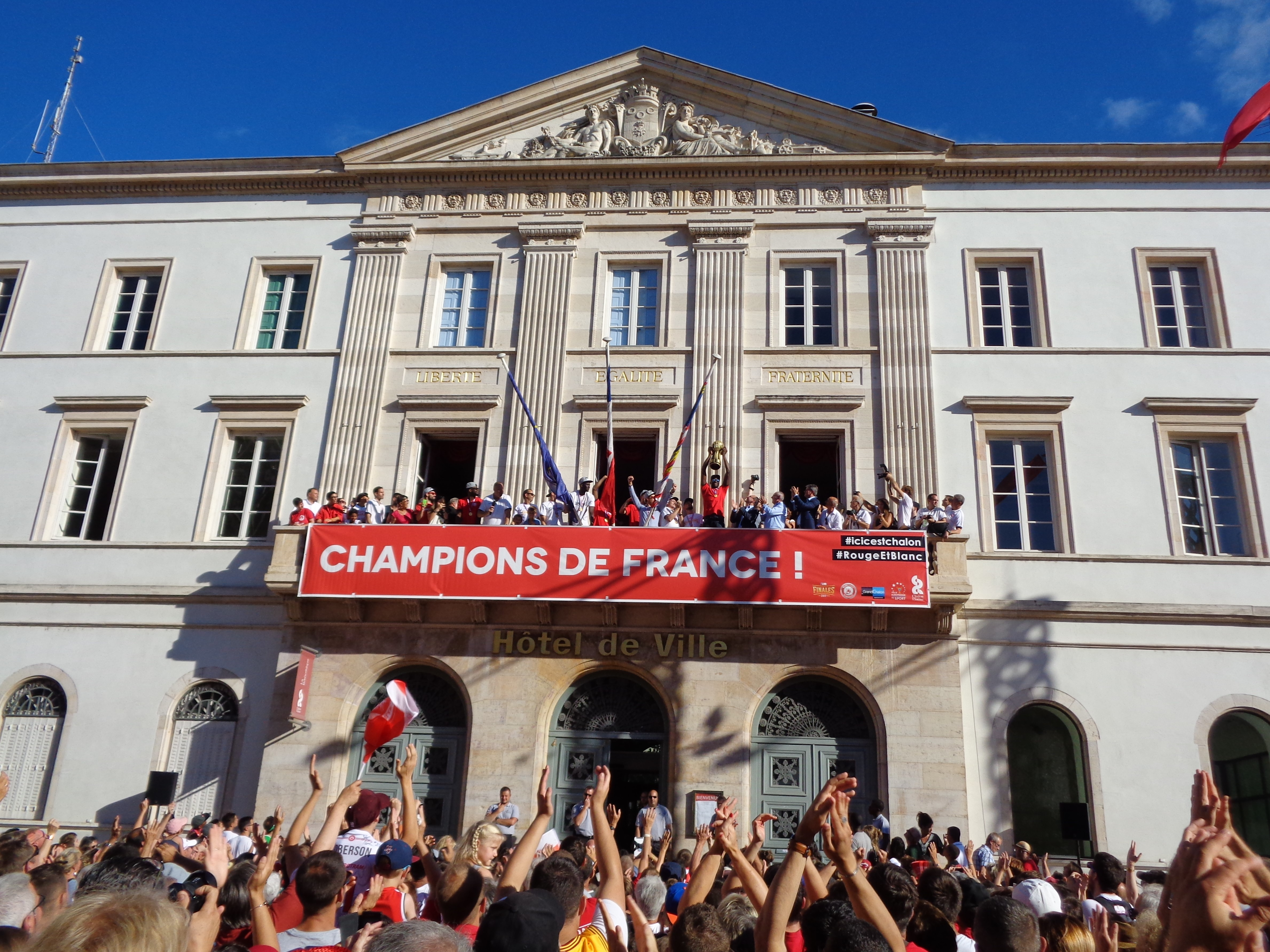
Celebration of the club's national championship in 2017

Total titles: 6

=== Domestic competitions ===
- French League

Winners (2): 2011–12, 2016–17

- French Cup

Winners (2): 2011, 2012

- Leaders Cup

Winners (1): 2012
Runners-up (2): 2011, 2016

- French Super Cup

Runners-up (3): 2011, 2012, 2017

=== European competitions ===
- FIBA Saporta Cup

Runners-up (1): 2000–01

- FIBA EuroChallenge

Runners-up (1): 2011–12

- FIBA Europe Cup

Runners-up (1): 2016–17
3rd place (1): 2015–16

=== Other competitions ===
- Bourg, France Basketball Tournament

Winners (1): 2008

== Season by season ==
| Season | Tier | League | Pos. | French Cup | Leaders Cup | European competitions | |
|---|---|---|---|---|---|---|---|
| 2006–07 | 1 | Pro A | 3rd | | Quarterfinalist | | |
| 2007–08 | 1 | Pro A | 9th | Round of 16 | | 2 ULEB Cup | R32 |
| 2008–09 | 1 | Pro A | 7th | Round of 16 | | | |
| 2009–10 | 1 | Pro A | 12th | Quarterfinalist | | 3 EuroChallenge | L16 |
| 2010–11 | 1 | Pro A | 5th | Champion | Runner-up | | |
| 2011–12 | 1 | Pro A | 1st | Champion | Champion | 3 EuroChallenge | RU |
| 2012–13 | 1 | Pro A | 4th | Round of 32 | Quarterfinalist | 1 Euroleague | RS |
| 2013–14 | 1 | Pro A | 8th | Round of 32 | | 2 Eurocup | RS |
| 2014–15 | 1 | Pro A | 8th | | | | |
| 2015–16 | 1 | Pro A | 5th | | Runner-up | 3 FIBA Europe Cup | 3rd |
| 2016–17 | 1 | Pro A | 1st | Champion | Quarterfinalist | 4 FIBA Europe Cup | RU |
| 2017–18 | 1 | Pro A | 12th | Round of 16 | | 3 Champions League | RS |
| 2018–19 | 1 | Pro A | 14th | Round of 16 | | | |
| 2019–20 | 1 | Pro A | 12th (Note: The 2019–20 season was declared void due to the COVID-19 pandemic, Élan Chalon was 12th in the standings at the time.) | | | | |
| 2020–21 | 1 | Pro A | 17th | Round of 64 | | | |
| 2021–22 | 2 | Pro B | 7th | Round of 64 | | | |
| 2022–23 | 2 | Pro B | 2nd | Round of 32 | | | |
| 2023–24 | 1 | Pro A | 14th | Round of 32 | | | |
| 2024–25 | 1 | Pro A | 7th | Round of 32 | | | |

== Head coaches ==
- (France) Philippe Hervé
- (France) Gregor Beugnot
- (France) Jean-Denys Choulet
