= 2017–18 Pro A season =

2017–18 Pro A
- Season: 2017–18
- Teams: 18

Regular season
- Season MVP: Zachery Peacock (JL Bourg)
- Relegated: Hyères-Toulon; Boulazac Dordogne

Finals
- Champions: Le Mans; 5th title
- Runners-up: Monaco

Statistical leaders
| Points | Zachery Peacock | 19.3 |
| Rebounds | Mouphtaou Yarou | 9.1 |
| Assists | Jerel Blassingame | 7.2 |

The 2017–18 Pro A season is the 96th season of the Pro A, the top basketball league in France organised by the Ligue nationale de basket (LNB).

On 2 March 2018, Jeep became the new main sponsor of the league and the league was re-named the Jeep Élite.

== Teams ==
Location of teams in 2017–18 Pro A season

=== Promotion and relegation ===
Orléans Loiret Basket and SLUC Nancy Basket were relegated after the 2016–17 season after the teams ended in the last two places. JL Bourg promoted as the regular season champion of the Pro B season. Boulazac Basket Dordogne was promoted as the winner of the Pro B promotion play-offs.

=== Locations and arenas ===
| Team | Home city | Stadium | Capacity |
|---|---|---|---|
| Antibes Sharks | Antibes | Azur Arena Antibes | 5,249 |
| Boulazac Dordogne | Boulazac | Le Palio | 5,200 |
| Monaco | Fontvieille, Monaco | Salle Gaston Médecin | 3,700 |
| ASVEL | Lyon–Villeurbanne | Astroballe | 5,556 |
| BCM Gravelines Dunkerque | Gravelines | Sportica | 3,500 |
| Champagne Châlons Reims | Reims | Complexe René-Tys | 3,000 |
| Cholet Basket | Cholet | La Meilleraie | 5,191 |
| Élan Béarnais | Pau | Palais des Sports de Pau | 7,707 |
| Élan Chalon ● | Chalon-sur-Saône | Le Colisée | 5,000 |
| ESSM Le Portel | Le Portel | Le Chaudron | 3,500 |
| Hyères-Toulon Var | Hyères–Toulon | Palais des Sports de Toulon | 4,700 |
| JDA Dijon | Dijon | Palais des Sports de Dijon | 5,000 |
| JL Bourg | Bourg-en-Bresse | Ekinox | 3,548 |
| Nanterre 92 | Nanterre | Palais des Sports de Nanterre | 3,000 |
| Le Mans Sarthe | Le Mans | Antarès | 6,003 |
| Limoges CSP | Limoges | Beaublanc | 6,000 |
| Levallois Metropolitans | Levallois | Palais des Sports Marcel Cerdan | 4,000 |
| SIG Strasbourg | Strasbourg | Rhénus Sport | 6,200 |

Notes

◆ Team makes its debut in the Pro A.
● The defending champions, winners of the 2016–17 Pro A season.

== Regular season ==
In the regular season, teams play against each other home-and-away in a round-robin format. The eight first qualified teams will advance to the Playoffs, while the last two qualified teams will be relegated to the Pro B.

=== Standings ===
| Pos | Team | Pld | W | L | PF | PA | PD | Qualification or relegation |
|---|---|---|---|---|---|---|---|---|
| 1 | Monaco | 34 | 25 | 9 | 2925 | 2647 | +278 | Qualification for playoffs |
| 2 | SIG Strasbourg | 34 | 24 | 10 | 2849 | 2605 | +244 | Qualification for playoffs |
| 3 | Le Mans Sarthe | 34 | 21 | 13 | 2733 | 2541 | +192 | Qualification for playoffs |
| 4 | Limoges CSP | 34 | 20 | 14 | 2657 | 2630 | +27 | Qualification for playoffs |
| 5 | JDA Dijon | 34 | 20 | 14 | 2788 | 2679 | +109 | Qualification for playoffs |
| 6 | ASVEL | 34 | 19 | 15 | 2745 | 2677 | +68 | Qualification for playoffs |
| 7 | Nanterre 92 | 34 | 19 | 15 | 2763 | 2748 | +15 | Qualification for playoffs |
| 8 | ÉB Pau-Lacq-Orthez | 34 | 18 | 16 | 2733 | 2710 | +23 | Qualification for playoffs |
| 9 | JL Bourg | 34 | 17 | 17 | 2793 | 2739 | +54 | |
| 10 | Levallois Metropolitans | 34 | 16 | 18 | 2694 | 2745 | −51 | |
| 11 | ESSM Le Portel | 34 | 16 | 18 | 2527 | 2553 | −26 | |
| 12 | Élan Chalon | 34 | 15 | 19 | 2795 | 2793 | +2 | |
| 13 | BCM Gravelines | 34 | 15 | 19 | 2595 | 2611 | −16 | |
| 14 | Champagne Châlons Reims | 34 | 15 | 19 | 2754 | 2850 | −96 | |
| 15 | Cholet | 34 | 14 | 20 | 2447 | 2572 | −125 | |
| 16 | Antibes Sharks | 34 | 13 | 21 | 2653 | 2782 | −129 | |
| 17 | Boulazac Dordogne (R) | 34 | 12 | 22 | 2639 | 2887 | −248 | Relegation to Pro B |
| 18 | Hyères-Toulon Var (R) | 34 | 6 | 28 | 2523 | 2844 | −321 | Relegation to Pro B |

Source: LNB.fr
Rules for classification: 1) points; 2) Head-to-head; 3) Points difference; 4) Points scored.
(R) Relegated

=== Results ===
| Home \ Away | ANT | BOU | MON | ASV | BCM | REI | CHO | PAU | CHA | ESSM | HTV | JDA | JLB | N92 | MSB | LIM | LEV | SIG |
|---|---|---|---|---|---|---|---|---|---|---|---|---|---|---|---|---|---|---|
| Antibes Sharks | — | 75–70 | | 91–73 | | 82–92 | | 86–85 | | 70–63 | 83–79 | 77–74 | | | 69–72 | | 73–82 | 79–57 |
| Boulazac Dordogne | | — | | 67–76 | 75–71 | 70–73 | 67–91 | 70–81 | | 88–87 | | 95–99 | | | 68–82 | 66–75 | | 109–102 |
| Monaco | 84–76 | 91–64 | — | 83–68 | 94–101 | | 86–62 | | 87–57 | 84–66 | | | | | 66–67 | 105–90 | 78–77 | 83–90 |
| ASVEL | | | | — | | 93–80 | 77–59 | 82–88 | | 83–69 | 102–85 | 86–69 | 83–87 | 81–65 | 79–71 | 71–68 | | |
| BCM Gravelines | 79–66 | 113–111 | 55–61 | 73–67 | — | | | 65–57 | | 55–63 | | 70–80 | 78–70 | | | | 81–65 | |
| Champagne Châlons Reims | 86–78 | 82–89 | 86–96 | | 83–72 | — | | | 103–97 | | 70–64 | | 63–95 | 76–85 | | 89–79 | 90–93 | |
| Cholet | 90–78 | | | 69–72 | 77–74 | 83–68 | — | | 70–64 | | 73–79 | 75–73 | | 77–80 | | 86–89 | | 63–73 |
| Élan Béarnais | 72–78 | | 68–90 | 94–82 | | 69–77 | 70–78 | — | 105–93 | | 84–56 | 65–85 | | 89–75 | | | 93–79 | |
| Élan Chalon | 95–81 | 87–89 | | 84–52 | 74–75 | | | 62–82 | — | | 82–67 | 81–77 | 93–99 | 85–55 | | | 77–79 | |
| ESSM Le Portel | | | | | | 96–69 | 73–62 | 77–69 | 87–83 | — | 75–62 | 74–58 | | 87–73 | | 73–51 | 77–82 | 75–80 |
| Hyères-Toulon Var | 68–88 | 70–63 | 99–103 | | 74–88 | | | | | | — | 75–72 | | 90–86 | 88–62 | 85–70 | 78–72 | 70–73 |
| JDA Dijon | | 101–81 | 71–99 | | | 86–61 | 78–62 | | 88–86 | | | — | 74–87 | | 82–72 | 79–70 | 93–85 | 65–77 |
| JL Bourg | 94–81 | 89–91 | 89–83 | 73–96 | 77–75 | | 76–77 | 91–82 | | 91–53 | 99–88 | | — | | | | 82–85 | 87–85 |
| Nanterre 92 | 93–77 | 98–68 | 99–69 | | 67–89 | | | | 93–82 | 85–54 | | 84–72 | 92–86 | — | 77–80 | 73–75 | | 102–100 |
| Le Mans Sarthe | | | 94–85 | | 103–63 | 90–84 | 65–47 | 73–58 | 63–66 | 77–63 | | | 91–70 | 83–87 | — | 89–65 | | |
| Limoges CSP | 98–80 | | | | 80–72 | | | 71–82 | 90–65 | 88–79 | 110–93 | | 88–75 | | 74–70 | — | | 80–74 |
| Levallois Metropolitans | | 81–71 | 71–77 | 72–65 | | 94–84 | 55–67 | | | | | | 65–74 | 96–91 | 76–87 | 81–87 | — | 81–83 |
| SIG Strasbourg | | | | 82–76 | 73–50 | 93–72 | 88–54 | 89–88 | 91–78 | 85–62 | 90–60 | | | | 76–78 | | | — |

Updated to match(es) played on 11 February 2018. Source: LNB
Legend: Blue = home team win; Red = away team win.

== Playoffs ==
The quarter-finals were played in a best-of-three format, while the semi-finals and finals were played in a best-of-five format. The higher seeded team played game one, three and five (if needed) at home. The play-offs began on 22 May 2018.

=== Bracket ===
Quarterfinals
1 | Monaco | 2
8 | ÉB Pau-Lacq-Orthez | 0
4 | Limoges CSP | 2
5 | JDA Dijon | 0
2 | SIG Strasbourg | 2
7 | Nanterre 92 | 0
3 | Le Mans | 2
6 | ASVEL | 1

Semifinals
1 | Monaco | 3
4 | Limoges CSP | 1
2 | SIG Strasbourg | 2
3 | Le Mans | 3

Finals
1 | Monaco | 2
3 | Le Mans | 3

=== Quarterfinals ===
| Team 1 | Series | Team 2 | Game 1 | Game 2 | Game 3 |
|---|---|---|---|---|---|
| Monaco | 2–0 | ÉB Pau-Lacq-Orthez | 99–97 | 98–73 | |
| Limoges CSP | 2–0 | JDA Dijon | 79–75 | 81–64 | |
| SIG Strasbourg | 2–0 | Nanterre 92 | 83–77 | 77–70 | |
| Le Mans | 2–1 | ASVEL | 68–81 | 72–67 | 79–68 |

=== Semifinals ===
| Team 1 | Series | Team 2 | Game 1 | Game 2 | Game 3 | Game 4 | Game 5 |
|---|---|---|---|---|---|---|---|
| Monaco | 3–1 | Limoges CSP | 88–71 | 78–71 | 71-76 | 94-83 | |
| SIG Strasbourg | 2–3 | Le Mans | 76–66 | 71–80 | 60-80 | 89-82 | 79–85 OT |

=== Finals ===
| Team 1 | Series | Team 2 | Game 1 | Game 2 | Game 3 | Game 4 | Game 5 |
|---|---|---|---|---|---|---|---|
| Monaco | 2–3 | Le Mans | 78–71 | 77–87 | 72–84 | 78–69 | 74–76 |

== Individual honours ==
=== Season awards ===
| Award | Player | Club |
|---|---|---|
| Most Valuable Player | (United States) Zach Peacock | JL Bourg |
| Final MVP | (United States) (North Macedonia) Romeo Travis | Le Mans |
| Best Young Player | (France) Adam Mokoka | BCM Gravelines-Dunkerque |
| Best Sixth Man | (United States) D. J. Stephens | Le Mans |
| Best Coach | (Montenegro) Zvezdan Mitrović | Monaco |

=== MVP of the Month ===
| Month | Player | Club | Ref. |
|---|---|---|---|
| October | (United States) Zachery Peacock | JL Bourg | |
| November | (United States) Trae Golden | ESSM Le Portel | |
| December | (United States) Quincy Diggs | Boulazac Dordogne | |
| January | (United States) Frank Hassell | ESSM Le Portel | |
| February | (United States) Chris Johnson | BCM Gravelines-Dunkerque | |
| March | (France) Jacques Alingue | JDA Dijon | |
| April | (France) Valentin Bigote | JDA Dijon | |
| May | (United States) Kevin Jones | Nanterre 92 | |

== French clubs in European competitions ==
| Team | Competition | Progress | Ref |
|---|---|---|---|
| Levallois Metropolitans | EuroCup | Group Stage | |
| ASVEL Basket | EuroCup | Top 16 | |
| Limoges | EuroCup | Top 16 | |
| Élan Chalon | Champions League | Group Stage | |
| SIG Strasbourg | Champions League | Quarterfinal | |
| AS Monaco Basket | Champions League | Final | |
| Nanterre 92 | Champions League | Top 16 | |
| ESSM Le Portel | FIBA Europe Cup | Quarterfinal | |

== See also ==
- 2017–18 Pro B season
