= 2016–17 Pro A season =

95th season of Pro A basketball league

2016–17 Pro A
- Season: 2016–17
- Duration: 24 September 2016–24 June 2017
- Games played: 330
- Teams: 18

Regular season
- Top seed: Monaco
- Season MVP: D.J. Cooper (Pau-Lacq-Orthez)
- Relegated: Orléans Loiret; SLUC Nancy

Finals
- Champions: Élan Chalon; 2nd title
- Runners-up: SIG Strasbourg
- Finals MVP: Jérémy Nzeulie (Chalon)

Statistical leaders
Points	Cameron Clark (Chalon)	18.6
Rebounds	Moustapha Fall (Chalon)	9.1
Assists	D. J. Cooper (Pau-Lacq-Orthez)	11.1

The 2016–17 Pro A season was the 95th season of the Pro A, the top basketball league in France organised by the Ligue Nationale de Basket (LNB). The season started on 24 September 2016 and ended on 24 June 2017.

A total of 330 games were played over the season, as Élan Chalon won its second national championship in club history after beating SIG Strasbourg in the playoff finals. D. J. Cooper of Élan Béarnais Pau-Lacq-Orthez was named Most Valuable Player of the regular season.

== Teams ==
Location of teams in 2016–17 Pro A season

=== Promotion and relegation ===
Rouen Métropole Basket and STB Le Havre were relegated after finishing in the last two spots in the 2015–16 Pro A season. Hyères-Toulon Var Basket was promoted after it was crowned as the new Pro B champions. ESSM Le Portel was promoted from the Pro B after winning the promotion play-offs.

=== Locations and arenas ===
Team	Home city	Stadium	Capacity
Antibes Sharks	Antibes	Azur Arena Antibes	5,249
Monaco	Fontvieille, Monaco	Salle Gaston Médecin	3,700
ASVEL ●	Lyon–Villeurbanne	Astroballe	5,556
BCM Gravelines Dunkerque	Gravelines	Sportica	3,500
Champagne Châlons Reims	Reims	Complexe René-Tys	3,000
Cholet Basket	Cholet	La Meilleraie	5,191
Élan Béarnais Pau-Orthez	Pau	Palais des Sports de Pau	7,707
Élan Chalon	Chalon-sur-Saône	Le Colisée	5,000
ESSM Le Portel ◆	Le Portel	Le Chaudron	3,500
Hyères-Toulon Var Basket	Hyères–Toulon	Palais des Sports de Toulon	4,700
JDA Dijon	Dijon	Palais des Sports de Dijon	5,000
Nanterre 92	Nanterre	Palais des Sports de Nanterre	3,000
Le Mans Sarthe Basket	Le Mans	Antarès	6,003
Limoges CSP	Limoges	Beaublanc	6,000
Orléans Loiret Basket	Orléans	Zénith d'Orléans	5,338
Paris-Levallois Basket	Paris–Levallois	Stade Pierre de Coubertin; Palais des Sports Marcel Cerdan	4,200; 4,000
SLUC Nancy Basket	Nancy	Palais des Sports Jean Weille	6,027
SIG Strasbourg	Strasbourg	Rhénus Sport	6,200

Notes

◆ Team makes its debut in the Pro A.
● The defending champions, winners of the 2015–16 Pro A season.

== Regular season ==
In the regular season, teams play against each other home-and-away in a round-robin format. The eight first qualified teams will advance to the Playoffs, while the last two qualified teams will be relegated to the Pro B.

=== League table ===
Pos	Team	Pld	W	L	PF	PA	PR	PCT	Qualification or relegation
1	Monaco	34	30	4	2869	2504	1.146	.882	Advance to playoffs
2	Élan Chalon	34	27	7	2871	2592	1.108	.794	Advance to playoffs
3	Nanterre 92	34	25	9	2765	2580	1.072	.735	Advance to playoffs
4	SIG Strasbourg	34	23	11	2689	2468	1.090	.676	Advance to playoffs
5	Élan Béarnais Pau-Lacq-Orthez	34	22	12	2678	2551	1.050	.647	Advance to playoffs
6	Paris-Levallois	34	20	14	2609	2463	1.059	.588	Advance to playoffs
7	ESSM Le Portel	34	19	15	2499	2384	1.048	.559	Advance to playoffs
8	ASVEL	34	19	15	2550	2544	1.002	.559	Advance to playoffs
9	BCM Gravelines Dunkerque	34	16	18	2662	2694	0.988	.471	
10	Limoges CSP	34	15	19	2606	2677	0.973	.441	
11	Cholet	34	14	20	2504	2643	0.947	.412	
12	Le Mans Sarthe	34	14	20	2452	2565	0.956	.412	
13	JDA Dijon	34	12	22	2486	2567	0.968	.353	
14	Antibes Sharks	34	12	22	2442	2596	0.941	.353	
15	Hyères-Toulon Var	34	11	23	2450	2546	0.962	.324	
16	Champagne Châlons Reims	34	10	24	2660	2886	0.922	.294	
17	Orléans Loiret (R)	34	9	25	2454	2720	0.902	.265	Relegation to Pro B
18	SLUC Nancy (R)	34	8	26	2553	2819	0.906	.235	Relegation to Pro B

Source: LNB
(R) Relegated

== Playoffs ==
The quarter-finals were played in a best-of-three format, while the semi-finals and finals were played in a best-of-five format. The higher seeded team would get home advantage during the series.

Quarter-finals
1 Monaco	69	71	71
8 ASVEL	72	66	74
4 SIG Strasbourg	92	83	72
5 Élan Béarnais Pau-Lacq-Orthez	102	68	68
2 Élan Chalon	76	88
7 ESSM Le Portel	63	74
3 Nanterre 92	85	71
6 Paris-Levallois	88	77

Semi-finals
8 ASVEL	74	74	64	64	69
4 SIG Strasbourg	72	73	67	68	70
2 Élan Chalon	72	84	69	82
6 Paris-Levallois	69	77	86	55

Final
4 SIG Strasbourg	75	74	70	84	65
2 Élan Chalon	89	72	71	78	74

== Final standings ==
Pos	Team	Pld	W	L	Qualification or relegation
1	Élan Chalon (C)	46	35	11	Qualification for Champions League
2	SIG Strasbourg	47	30	17	Qualification for Champions League
3	Paris-Levallois	34	20	14	Qualification for EuroCup
4	ASVEL	42	23	19	Qualification for EuroCup
5	Monaco	37	31	6	Qualification for Champions League
6	Nanterre 92	36	25	11	Qualification for Champions League qualifying rounds
7	Élan Béarnais Pau-Lacq-Orthez	47	23	24	
8	ESSM Le Portel	42	22	20	Qualification for FIBA Europe Cup qualifying rounds (Note: ESSM Le Portel was granted the spot in the qualifying rounds of the FIBA Europe Cup, after Élan Béarnais Pau-Lacq-Orthez rejected its offer.)
9	BCM Gravelines Dunkerque	34	16	18	
10	Limoges CSP	34	15	19	Qualification for EuroCup (Note: Limoges CSP was invited as a wild card for the EuroCup.)
11	Cholet	34	14	20	
12	Le Mans Sarthe	34	14	20	
13	JDA Dijon	34	12	22	
14	Antibes Sharks	34	12	22	
15	Hyères-Toulon Var	34	11	23	
16	Champagne Châlons Reims	34	10	24	
17	Orléans Loiret (R)	34	9	25	Relegation to Pro B
18	SLUC Nancy (R)	34	8	26	Relegation to Pro B

Source: LNB
Rules for classification: 1) Finals appearance 2) First seed in the regular season 3) Playoff round elimination 4) Regular season record
(C) Champions; (R) Relegated

== All-Star Game ==
The event took place on 29 December 2016 and the game was played at the Bercy Arena in Paris. The Foreign Team won the game 129–130 and John Roberson of Élan Chalon was named All-Star Game MVP.

== Awards ==
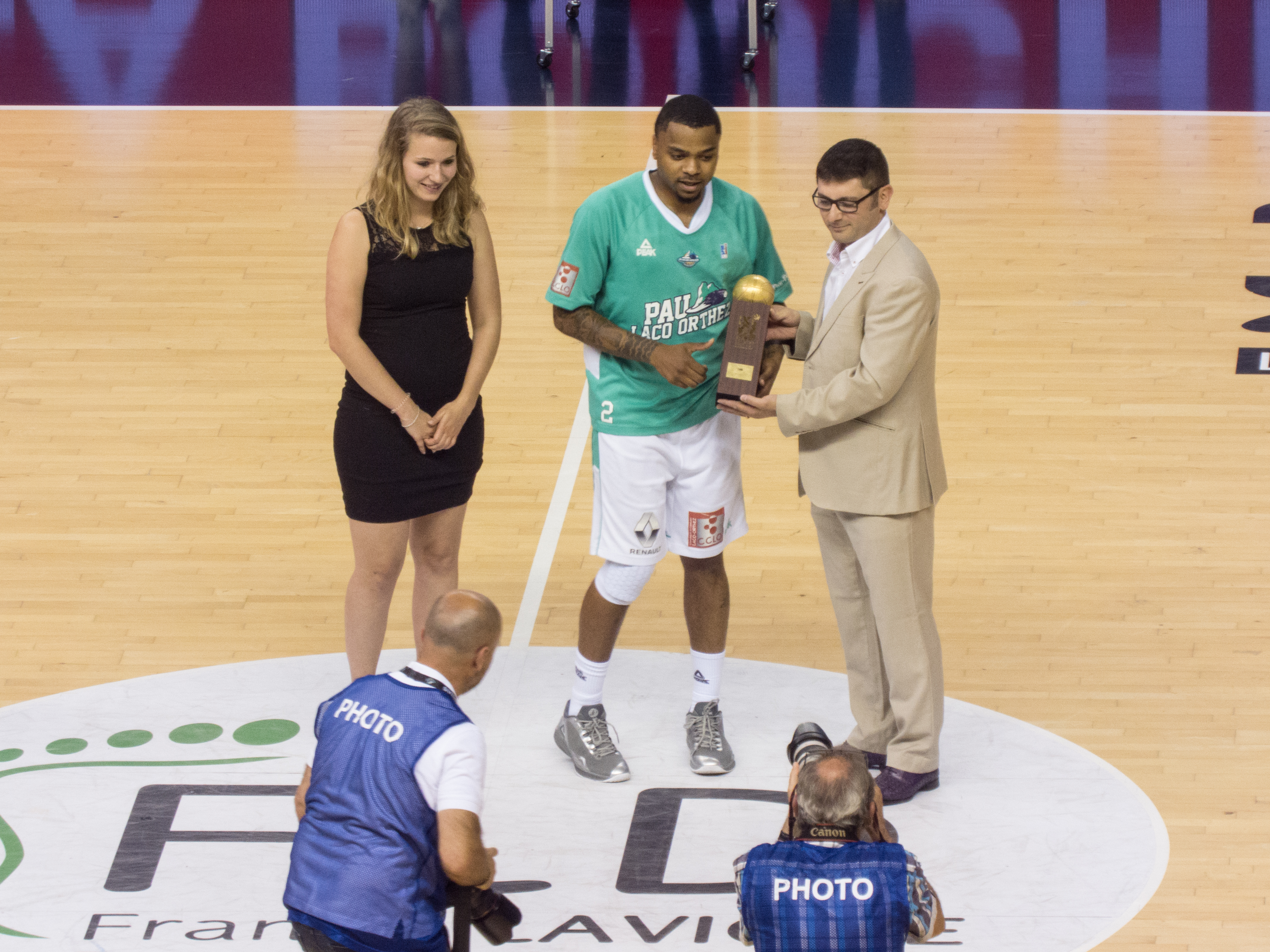
D. J. Cooper receiving the Most Valuable Player Award

Most Valuable Player

- (United States) D.J. Cooper – Élan Béarnais Pau-Lacq-Orthez

Finals MVP

- (Cameroon) Jérémy Nzeulie – Élan Chalon

Best Coach

- (Montenegro) Zvezdan Mitrović – Monaco

Best Defender

- (France) Moustapha Fall – Élan Chalon

Best Young Player

- (France) Frank Ntilikina – SIG Strasbourg

Most Improved Player

- (France) Paul Lacombe – SIG Strasbourg

Sixth Man of the Year

- (France) Louis Labeyrie – Paris-Levallois

== See also ==
- 2016–17 French Basketball Cup
