= Kevin Thalien =

French basketball player

No. 7 – Metropolitans 92
- Position: Point guard
- League: Élite 2

Personal information
- Born: February 20, 1992 (age 34) Colombes, France
- Listed height: 1.90 m (6 ft 3 in)

Career information
- NBA draft: 2010: undrafted
- Playing career: 2010–present

Career history
- 2010–2011: SLUC Nancy u21
- 2011–2012: SLUC Nancy
- 2012–2013: JSA Bordeaux
- 2013–2014: Orchies
- 2014–2015: Étoile Charleville-Mézières
- 2015–2016: Berck Rang du Fliers
- 2016–2017: Hyères-Toulon
- 2017–2018: La Charité Basket 58
- 2018–2019: Tarbes-Lourdes Pyrénées
- 2019–2020: Gries Oberhoffen
- 2020–2021: Étoile Angers Basket
- 2021–2022: Chartres
- 2022–2024: Levallois
- 2024–present: Metropolitans 92

Kevin Thalien (born February 20, 1992, in Colombes, France) is a French professional basketball player for Metropolitans 92 of the Élite 2. He began his career with SLUC Nancy's junior team and made his debut with their main team during the 2011–12 season. Throughout his career, Thalien has played for various French clubs in lower divisions.
