= Ronnie Burrell =

American basketball player (born 1983)

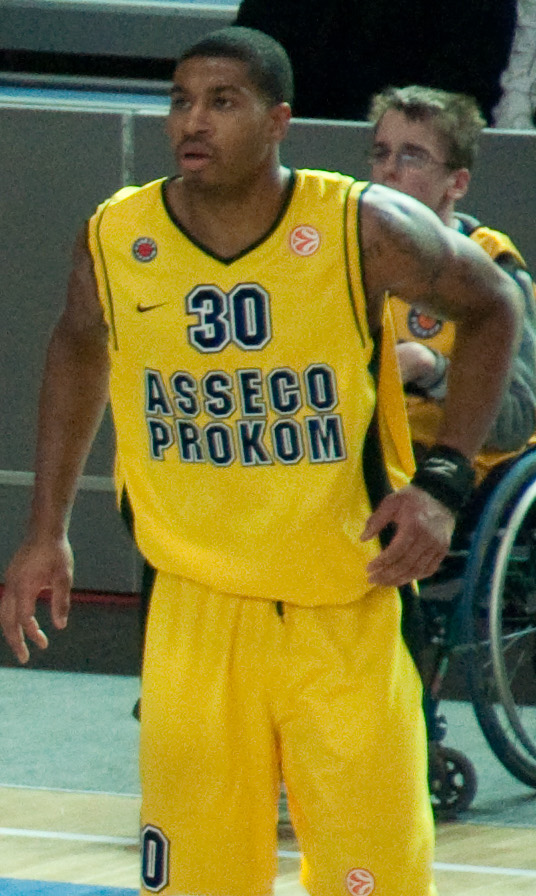
- Burrell playing with Arka Gdynia in 2009

Osceola Magic
- Title: Head coach
- League: NBA G League

Personal information
- Born: July 21, 1983 (age 43) Livingston, New Jersey, U.S.
- Listed height: 6 ft 9 in (2.06 m)
- Listed weight: 235 lb (107 kg)

Career information
- High school: Montclair (Montclair, New Jersey)
- College: UNC Greensboro (2001–2005)
- NBA draft: 2005: undrafted
- Playing career: 2005–2016
- Position: Power forward / small forward
- Number: 24, 26, 30
- Coaching career: 2019–present

Career history

Playing
- 2005: Gainesville Knights
- 2005–2006: Levallois SCB
- 2006–2007: Köln 99ers
- 2007–2008: Telekom Baskets Bonn
- 2008–2011: Arka Gdynia
- 2011–2013: EWE Baskets Oldenburg
- 2013–2015: Bayreuth
- 2015–2016: Orchies
- 2016: Lille Métropole BC

Coaching
- 2019–2020: Long Island Nets (assistant)
- 2022–2023: Long Island Nets
- 2023–2024: Brooklyn Nets (assistant)
- 2024–2026: Portland Trail Blazers (assistant)
- 2026–present: Osceola Magic

Career highlights
- As player: 3× Polish League champion (2009–2011); Polish Supercup winner (2010); German Cup winner (2007); German Supercup winner (2006); Second-team All-SoCon (2005); Third-team All-SoCon (2004); As coach: NBA G League Coach of the Year (2023)

Ronald Alexander Burrell (born July 21, 1983) is an American former professional basketball player, and current head coach for the Osceola Magic of the NBA G League.

== Early life ==
Born in 1983, Burrell played high school basketball at Montclair High School, in Montclair, New Jersey.

== College career ==
Burrell played college basketball at UNC Greensboro, from 2001 to 2005, with the UNC Greensboro Spartans. He played under the team's head coach at that time, Fran McCaffery. During his college career, he was an All-Southern Conference Team selection in 2004 and 2005.

== Professional career ==
Burrell played with the WBA's Gainesville Knights, in 2005. Burrell then moved to Europe, and signed with the French club Levallois SCB for the 2005–06 season. The following season, he signed with RheinEnergie Koln, where he won the German Cup. He played in the NBA Summer League with the Seattle SuperSonics's summer league squad for two summers. After that, he played with the German club Telekom Baskets Bonn, and the Polish club Asseco Prokom Sopot/Gdynia. With Gdynia, he also won three Polish League championships. Burrell played in 55 EuroLeague games, and he made it to the EuroLeague's quarterfinals in the 2009–10 season.

In 2011, he signed a contract with the German club EWE Baskets Oldenburg. In July 2013, he signed with the German club BBC Bayreuth. In September 2015, he signed a contract with the French club Orchies. He signed with the French club Lille Métropole, in February 2016. Burrell retired from playing pro club basketball in April 2016, due to an injury.

== Coaching career ==
On September 20, 2019, Burrell was hired as an assistant coach by the Long Island Nets, the NBA Development League affiliate of the NBA club the Brooklyn Nets.

On November 14, 2020, he was hired as player development coach with the Chicago Bulls.

In September 2022, Burrell became head coach of Long Island Nets, the G League affiliate of the NBA's Brooklyn Nets. He was named Coach of the Month by the G League for both January and February 2023, making him only the fourth coach to win back-to-back Coach of the Month honors in G League history.

Burrell was named Coach of the Year for the G League in spring 2023.

On July 25, 2024, Burrell was hired as assistant coach for the Portland Trail Blazers.

On September 24, 2026, Burrell was named as the head coach for the Osceola Magic of the NBA G League.
