= Bastien Pinault =

French basketball player

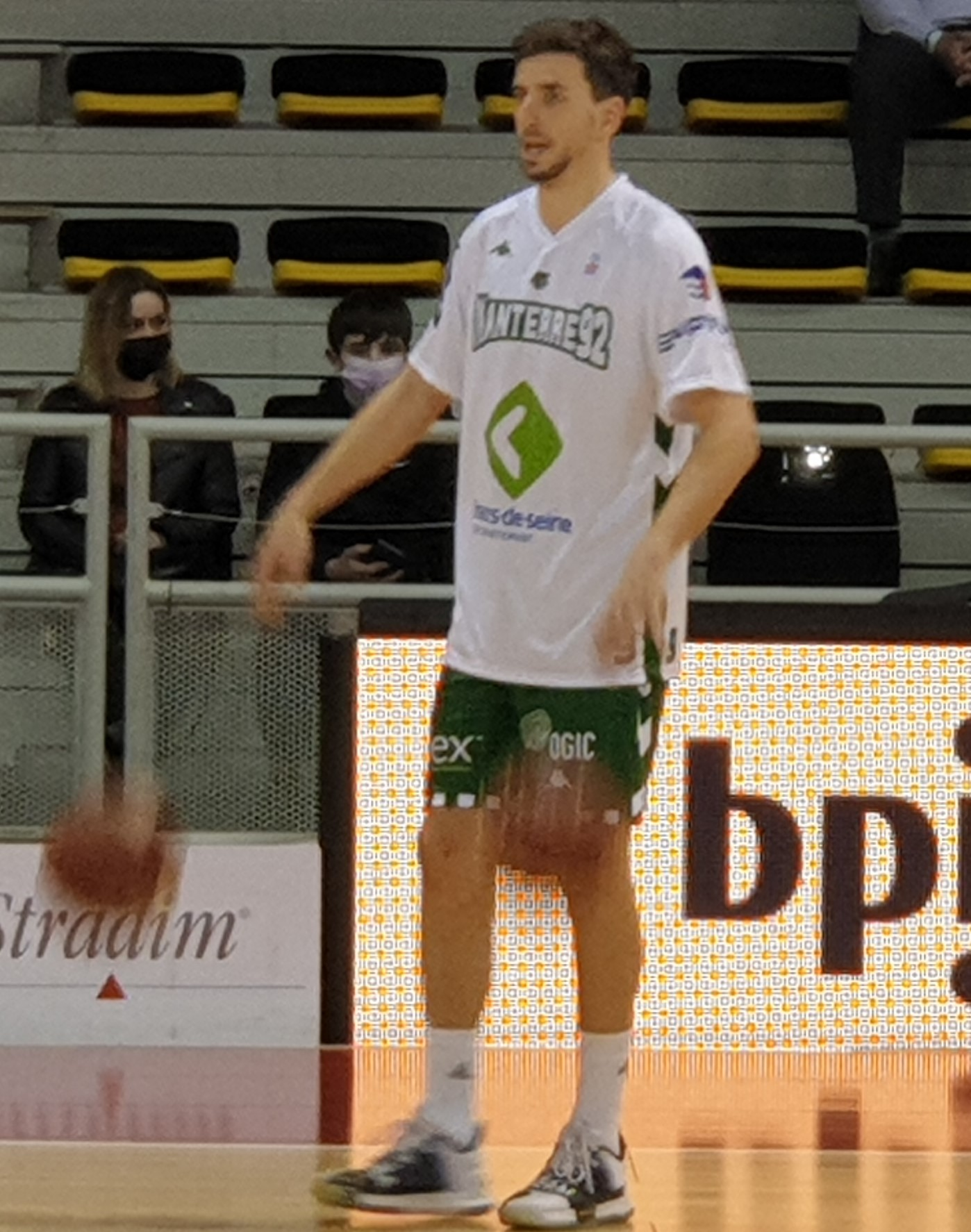
- Pinault with Nanterre in February 2022

No. 9 – Élan Béarnais
- Position: Shooting guard
- League: LNB Élite

Personal information
- Born: 18 October 1993 (age 33) Tarbes, France
- Listed height: 6 ft 5 in (1.96 m)
- Listed weight: 192 lb (87 kg)

Career information
- NBA draft: 2015: undrafted
- Playing career: 2012–present

Career history
- 2012–2014: Élan Béarnais Pau-Lacq-Orthez
- 2014-2015: La Rochelle
- 2015–2017: ALM Évreux
- 2017–2019: Élan Chalon
- 2019–2021: Metropolitans 92
- 2021–2024: Nanterre 92
- 2024–present: Élan Béarnais

Bastien Pinault (born 18 October 1993) is a French professional basketball player for Élan Béarnais of the LNB Élite.

== Professional career ==
Born in Tarbes, he was trained at the Élan Béarnais Pau-Lacq-Orthez and then played for La Rochelle. Pinault played the 2016-17 season with ALM Évreux. He averaged 8.8 points, 1.6 rebounds and 2 assists per game in Pro B. In June 2017 he inked with Élan Chalon to a two-year deal.

On 5 July 2021 he signed with Nanterre 92 of LNB Pro A.
