= Tyren Johnson =

American basketball player (born 1988)

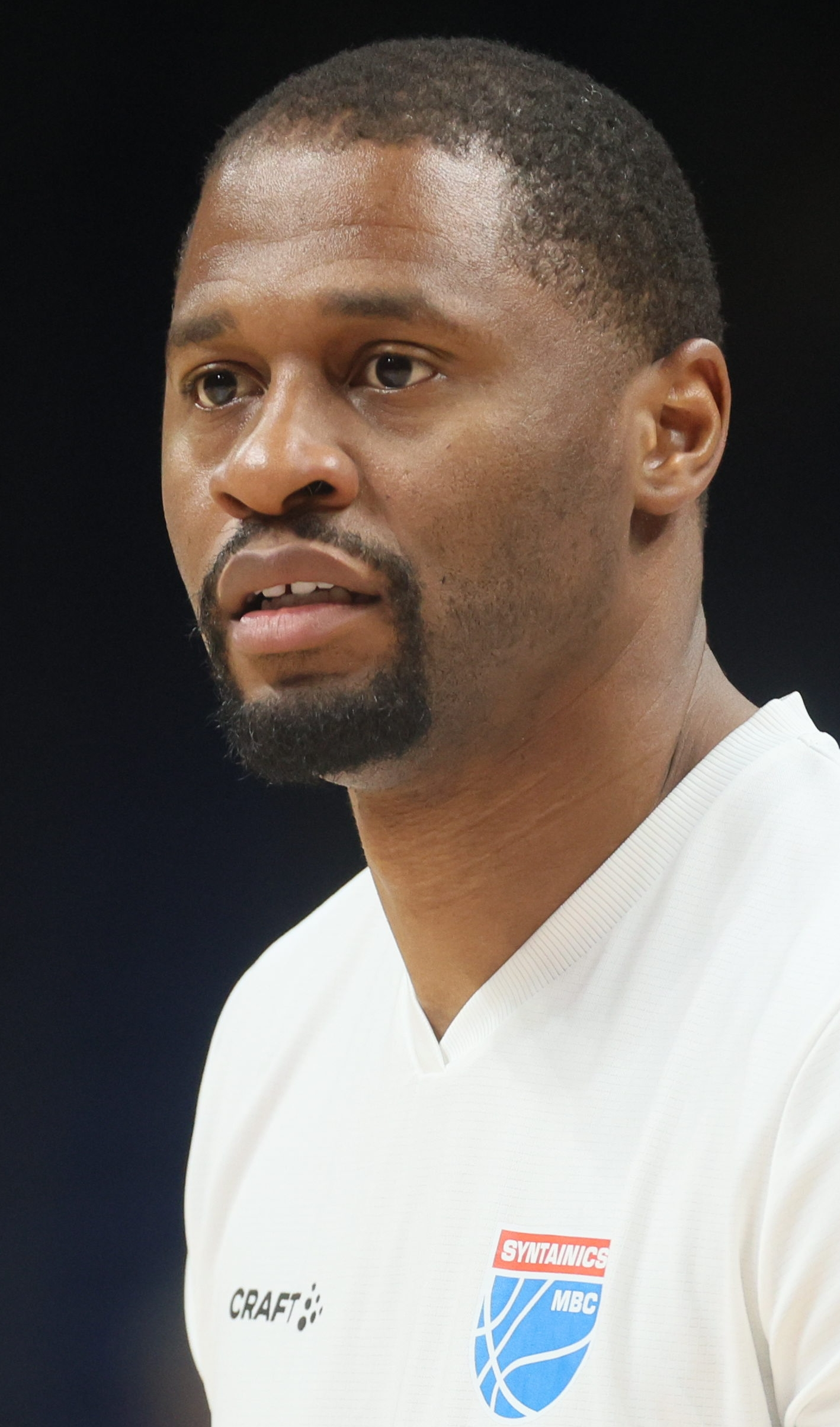
- Johnson in 2025

Free agent
- Position: Power forward

Personal information
- Born: July 24, 1988 (age 38)
- Listed height: 6 ft 8 in (2.03 m)
- Listed weight: 209 lb (95 kg)

Career information
- High school: West St. John (Edgard, Louisiana)
- College: Louisiana (2006–2010)
- NBA draft: 2010: undrafted
- Playing career: 2010–present

Career history
- 2010–2011: Okapi Aalstar
- 2011–2012: Rio Grande Valley Vipers
- 2012–2013: Reims Champagne
- 2013–2014: Hyères-Toulon Var
- 2014–2015: Okapi Aalstar
- 2015–2016: Kyoto Hannaryz
- 2016: Lavrio
- 2017–2020: ADA Blois
- 2020: Dorados de Chihuahua
- 2020–2023: ADA Blois
- 2023–2024: SLUC Nancy Basket
- 2024–2025: SYNTAINICS MBC
- 2025: Dorados de Chihuahua

Career highlights
- 2× LNB Pro B champion (2018, 2022); French 2nd Division MVP (2018); LNB Pro B Best Scorer (2020); NBA D-League All-Star (2012); AP Honorable mention All-American (2010); Sun Belt Player of the Year (2010); First-team All-Sun Belt (2010)

Tyren Milton Johnson (born July 24, 1988) is an American professional basketball player who last played for SYNTAINICS MBC of the Basketball Bundesliga (BBL). A native of Edgard, Louisiana, Johnson played college basketball at Louisiana where he was named the Sun Belt Conference Player of the Year as a senior in 2009–10. Since 2010 he has competed professionally and was named an NBA Development League All-Star in 2011–12.

== College career ==
After graduating from West St. John High School in Edgard, Johnson began his collegiate career for Louisiana–Lafayette in 2006. His freshman season was inauspicious; he averaged 1.6 points and 1.7 rebounds per game in 25 games played. He scored a total of 41 points on the year. The following season, 2007–08, was similar to his freshman campaign. Johnson averaged 3.1 points and 3.5 rebounds per game while only scoring 90 points on the year.

In Johnson's junior season, his productivity markedly increased to 7.2 points, 5.1 rebounds, 1.5 assists, 1.3 blocks, and 0.8 steals per game. Despite his increase in personal success, the Ragin' Cajuns only mustered a 10–20 overall record for the year. For the third time in as many seasons, they failed to earn a postseason tournament bid.

The 2009–10 season saw Johnson become an All-Sun Belt Conference performer. His season statistical averages shot up to 17.9 points, 8.0 rebounds, 3.3 assists, 1.8 steals, and 1.5 blocks per game. He led Louisiana–Lafayette in all five categories and was the only Sun Belt player to lead their team in all. The league's coaches voted him as a first team All-Sun Belt selection as well. Johnson became Louisiana–Lafayette's fourth conference player of the year since the school joined NCAA Division I, and the first since Michael Allen in 1993–94. The 2009–10 season saw the Ragin' Cajuns go 9–0 in league play at home; they finished the year with an overall record of 13–17.

== Professional career ==
Johnson was not selected in the 2010 NBA draft. He began his professional basketball career in Belgium for Okapi Aalstar. He returned to the United States in 2011–12 and signed with the NBA Development League's Rio Grande Valley Vipers. In 44 games played, he averaged 11.7 points, 5.6 rebounds, and 2.4 assists per game. He was called up as a replacement player for the 2012 NBA Development League All-Star Game after Lance Thomas was unable to participate.

The 2012–13 and 2013–14 seasons saw Johnson playing in France for Châlons Reims and Hyères-Toulon Var, respectively. While at Hyères-Toulon Var, Johnson averaged 15.8 points and 6.1 rebounds per game. In September 2014, he signed with Okapi Aalstar for his second stint with the Belgian club.

On July 30, 2015, he signed with Uşak Sportif of the Turkish Basketball League. Johnson left the team in August 2015 after he failed a team physical.

On September 26, 2016, he signed with Lavrio of Greek Basket League. He was officially released on November 19, 2016, in order to attend to family matters back in his homeland.

In the 2017–18 season, Johnson played with ADA Blois Basket 41 of the French second-tier LNB Pro B. He led his team to the championship, which therefore meant promotion to the first-tier LNB Pro A. As well, he was named the league's Most Valuable Player. Johnson spent the 2019–20 season with ADA Blois and averaged 18.4 points, 5.8 rebounds and three assists per game. On June 8, 2020, Johnson signed with Dorados de Chihuahua of the LNBP. Later in 2020, he returned to ADA Blois.

In May 2023, the 16th, the ADA Blois basketball Club announces that Tyren Johnson is leaving the team at the end of a season in which he strongly participated to make the team stay at the highest French level

On July 27, 2023, he signed with SLUC Nancy Basket of the LNB Pro A.

On July 25, 2024, he signed with SYNTAINICS MBC of the Basketball Bundesliga (BBL).
