= ADA Blois Basket 41 =

- Leagues: LNB Pro B
- Founded: 1907; 118 years ago
- Arena: Jeu de Paume
- Capacity: 2,525
- Location: Blois, France
- Team colors: Black, White, Green
- President: Paul Seignolle
- Head coach: David Morabito
- Championships: 1 French Second League; 1 French Third League; 1 French Fourth League
- Website: ada-basket.com
Home	Away

Abeille des Aydes Blois Basket 41, commonly known as ADA Blois, is a professional basketball based in Blois, France. The club plays in the Pro A, which is the top tier of basketball in the country.

== History ==
The old club logo, until 2017

Created in 1907 under the name Abeille des Aydes, the club would first allow the practice of gymnastics and shooting. It is after the war that one begins to practice basketball there.

Between 1986 and 1995, ADA Basket, coached by Jean-Raoul Baudry, climbed from Regional 2 to National 2 with four consecutive accessions from 1987 to 1991. But at the end of the 1994–1995 season, the club filed for bankruptcy. and is downgraded at Regional 1. In 2001, the first team managed to find the National 2 where she played in 1994–1995.

On 10 September 2005. ADA Blois Basket was played its first match in National 1. At the end of this season, the team will be relegated to National 2 but will go up the following year in National 1. After failing in the final of the playoffs on several occasions in 2012, 2013 and 2015, ADA Blois wins the French National 1 Championship in 2016 and thus reaches the Pro B for the first time in its history.

On 29 March 2016. ADA Blois Basket won her home game against La Rochelle (75–50) and became French Champion of NM1 at 5 days before the end of the 2015–2016 season of National 1. The ADA would play in the Pro B for the first time in its history.

In 2017–18 season, Blois surprised by finishing the season first in the regular season with a 27–7 record in the Pro B. Thereby, Blois was crowned the Pro B champions and promoted to the top-tier Pro A. ADA power forward Tyren Johnson was named the Pro B Most Valuable Player. However, due to insufficient infrastructures, the club stayed in the second-tier division.

In 2022, Blois won the promotion play-offs to access the top-tier division for the first time in their history.

== Honours ==
- Pro B
  - Winners : 2017–18
- Nationale Masculine 1
  - Winners (1): 2015–16
- Nationale Masculine 2
  - Winners (1): 2004–05

== Season by season ==
Season	Tier	League	Pos.	W–L	Cup competitions
2011–12	3	NM1	3rd	23-11	
2012–13	3	NM1	3rd	24–10	
2013–14	3	NM1	8th	18–16	
2014–15	3	NM1	3rd	20–14	
2015–16	3	NM1	1st	27–7	
2016–17	2	Pro B	9th	17–17	
2017–18	2	Pro B	1st	27–7	
2018–19	2	Pro B	7th	19–15	
2019–20	2	Pro B	1st	19–4	
2020–21	2	Pro B	7th	20–14	
2021–22	2	Pro B	4th	20–14	
2022–23	1	Pro A	16th	14–20	
2023–24	1	Pro A	16th	11–23	

== Players ==
=== Current roster ===
Note: Flags indicate national team eligibility at FIBA-sanctioned events. Players may hold other non-FIBA nationalities not displayed.

ADA Blois Basket 41 roster
Players
Coaches

Pos.	No.	Nat.	Name	Ht.	Age
PF	0	(France)	Damase, Fabien	2.06 m (6 ft 9 in)	23 – 25 January 2002
G	3	(France)	Vergiat, Timothe	1.88 m (6 ft 2 in)	27 – 4 March 1998
G	8	(France)	Soulhac, Talis	1.85 m (6 ft 1 in)	18 – 19 September 2006
C	10	(Chad)	Alingue, Jacques	2.01 m (6 ft 7 in)	37 – 30 April 1988
F	20	(France)	Morency, Romuald	2.01 m (6 ft 7 in)	29 – 26 July 1995
F	32	(France)	Ugolin, Lucas	1.96 m (6 ft 5 in)	23 – 23 April 2002
SG	43	(France)	Sconard, Maxime	1.93 m (6 ft 4 in)	21 – 10 July 2003
C		(France)	Mambo, Yasmin	2.03 m (6 ft 8 in)	22 – 24 September 2002
F		(France)	Boulefaa, Jonas	2.03 m (6 ft 8 in)	18 – 16 January 2007

Head coach

- (France) David Morabito

Assistant coach(es)

- (France) Antony Montant

Legend

- (C) Team captain
- Injured

- Roster
Updated: June 10, 2025

=== Individual awards ===
Pro B Most Valuable Player

- Tyren Johnson – 2018

=== Notable players ===
Note: Flags indicate national team eligibility at FIBA-sanctioned events. Players may hold other non-FIBA nationalities not displayed.

Criteria

To appear in this section a player must have either:

- Set a club record or won an individual award while at the club
- Played at least one official international match for their national team at any time
- Played at least one official NBA match at any time.

- (Canada) Kris Joseph
- (Ivory Coast) Charles Abouo
- (Ivory Coast) Pape-Philippe Amagou
- (Democratic Republic of the Congo) Omari Gudul
- (Democratic Republic of the Congo) Flo Thamba
- (Finland) Ville Kaunisto
- (France) Nobel Boungou Colo
- (France) Armel Traoré
- (France) Timothé Vergiat
- (Kosovo) Jaren Sina
- (Senegal) Lamine Sambe
- (United Kingdom) Eric Boateng
- (United Kingdom) Laurence Ekperigin
- (United States) Tyren Johnson
