= La Moutète =

Indoor sporting arena in Orthez, France

Coordinates: 43°29′16″N 0°46′36″W

La Moutète was an indoor sporting arena located in Orthez, France, home of Elan Bearnais Orthez French basketball team from 1931 to 1991. It was actually an indoor market place for Orthez inhabitants especially used to sell living poultries. The place was transformed into a basketball field for the home games, seats being built and unbuilt before and after every game.

As Elan Béarnais Orthez became a successful organisation, La Moutète became outdated for an elite team. The Elan Bearnais Orthez then moved to Pau the prefecture of Pyrénées-Atlantiques departement, in the modern arena of Palais des Sports de Pau and been renamed Élan Béarnais Pau-Orthez.

Nowadays La Moutète is a place for concerts, shows and expositions, also hosting a merchant gallery and a pub named after the former resident club.
