= Élan Béarnais =

French professional basketball club

Élan Béarnais Pau-Lacq-Orthez
- Nickname: EBPLO
- Leagues: LNB Élite
- Founded: 1931; 95 years ago
- History: Élan Béarnais Orthez (1931–1989); Élan Béarnais Pau-Orthez (1989–2008); Élan Béarnais Pau-Lacq-Orthez (2008–present)
- Arena: Palais des Sports de Pau
- Capacity: 7,707
- Location: Pau, Pyrénées-Atlantiques, France
- Team colors: White and Turquoise
- President: Sébastien Ménard
- General manager: Audrey Sauret
- Head coach: Mickaël Hay
- Championships: 1 Korać Cup; 9 French Championships; 4 French Cup; 4 French League Cup
- Website: elan-bearnais.fr
Home	Away

Élan Béarnais Pau-Lacq-Orthez, also known as simply Élan Béarnais (French pronunciation: [e.lɑ̃ be.aʁ.nɛ]), and formerly known as Élan Béarnais Pau-Orthez, is a French professional basketball club that is based in Pau. They compete in the top-highest tier French league, the LNB Élite. They are one of the most successful clubs in French basketball history, as they have won nine French League championships and have had European-wide successes as well.

== History ==
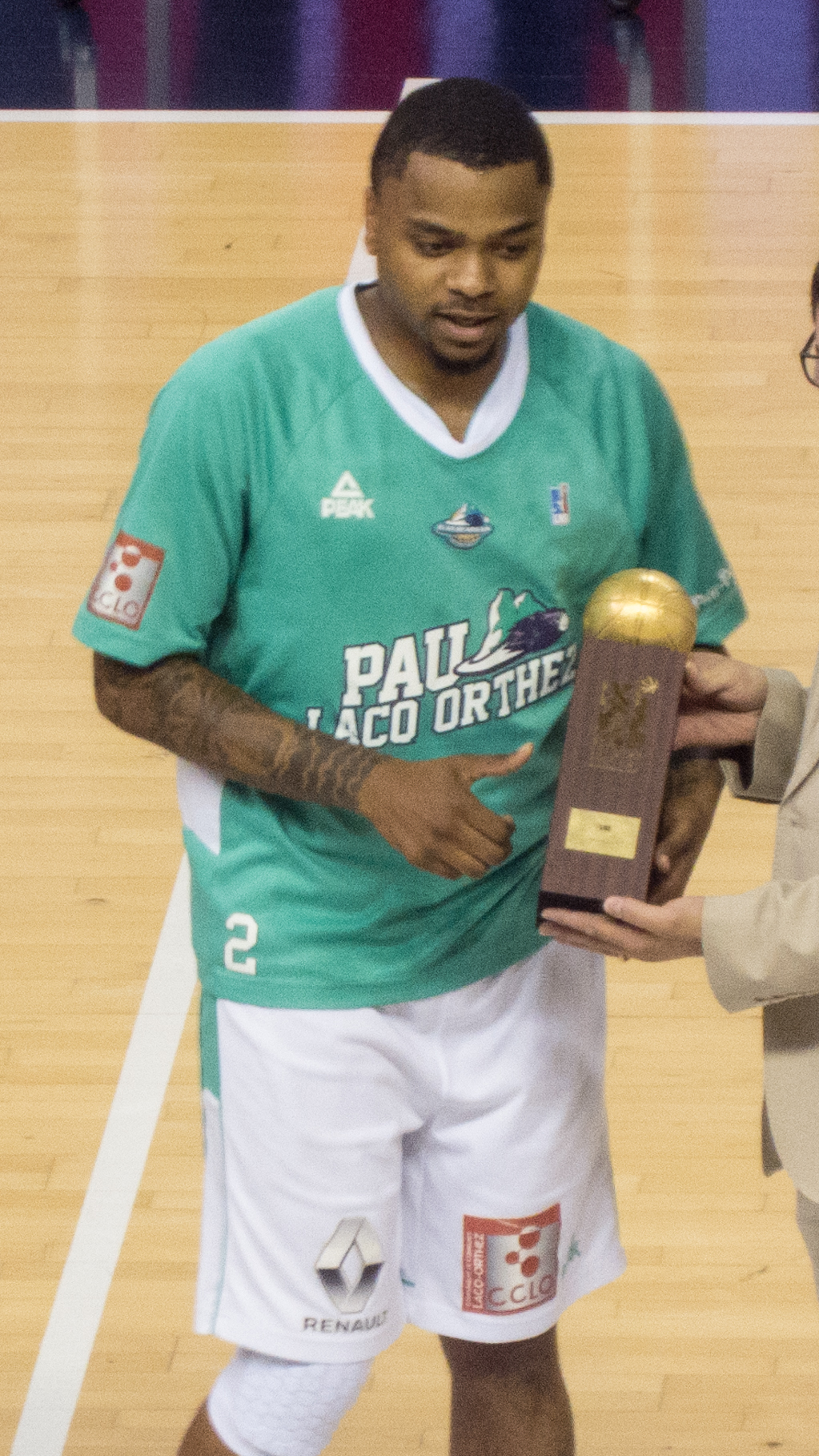
D.J. Cooper, 2017

The Élan Béarnais was founded in 1931 in the town of Orthez in Pyrénées-Atlantiques in the southwest of France. The club first reached the top level of French professional basketball in 1973. They were immediately relegated back to the second division, but returned to the top flight in 1976. The club then made their European debut one year later, in 1977, by qualifying for the FIBA Korać Cup. Their ascent continued by winning the FIBA Korać Cup in 1984, defeating Crvena zvezda in the final in Paris (Palais des sports Pierre-de-Coubertin). This was the first of many pieces of silverware that would be added to the club's trophy cabinet over the next two decades.

More success followed as the Élan Béarnais were finally crowned champions of France for the first time, winning back-to-back titles in 1986 and 1987. This earned them entry into the FIBA European Champions' Cup (present-day Euroleague). Despite their status as newcomers, they were anything but intimidated, completing their maiden campaign of 1986-87 with a third-place finish and a perfect record at home. They defeated European giants or traditional clubs of European basketball like Žalgiris, Maccabi Tel Aviv, Real Madrid, Zadar and that season's champions, Tracer Milano, on their home court, La Moutète. The Élan Béarnais would remain a fixture in European competition every season thereafter, until 2008, setting a European longevity record of 31 years in the process (1977–2008).

As this humble club from a village of 12,000 people at the foot of the Pyrénées became more popular, a move to a bigger city became necessary. The club changed its name in 1989, becoming the Élan Béarnais Pau-Orthez, and moved to the city of Pau, after the inauguration of the Palais des Sports in 1991. This move was made possible by the efforts of two men: Pierre Seillant, the longtime president of the club, and André Labarrère, then-mayor of Pau. The Palais (the largest basketball-centric arena in France) was built, and the Élan were able to remain in their home region of Béarn.

With the relocation complete, the club carried on cementing their status as the dominant force of French basketball, winning seven more league championships over the next thirteen years. The club's total of nine championships ranks them third behind ASVEL and Limoges for the most of any team in the history of French professional basketball. The last one came in 2004, the second of back-to-back titles, and was the culmination of a golden-age for the club. The previous season, 2003, was arguably the most spectacular in the history of Pau-Orthez, when the abilities of two homegrown, young talents named Boris Diaw and Mickaël Piétrus spearheaded the Élan Béarnais to a sweep of all three French trophies (Le Championnat, Coupe de France and Semaine des As). Diaw's campaign won him the League MVP award for French players, and following the season both he and Pietrus were drafted in the first round of the 2003 NBA draft.

Due to a loss of talent, coaching instability, and financial difficulties, the club's performance declined from 2004 onward. In 2009, Élan Béarnais was relegated to the LNB Pro B after finishing last in the league standings, their first appearance in the second division since 1976. The club used this period to restructure, and earned promotion back to Pro A in 2010, but was relegated again in 2012. Élan returned to the top flight the following season, and in 2013–14 narrowly missed qualifying for the playoffs for the first time since 2006. With Didier Gadou serving as General Manager, and former title-winning head-coach Claude Bergeaud returning as head coach, the club was positioned for a playoff berth halfway through the 2014-15 season.

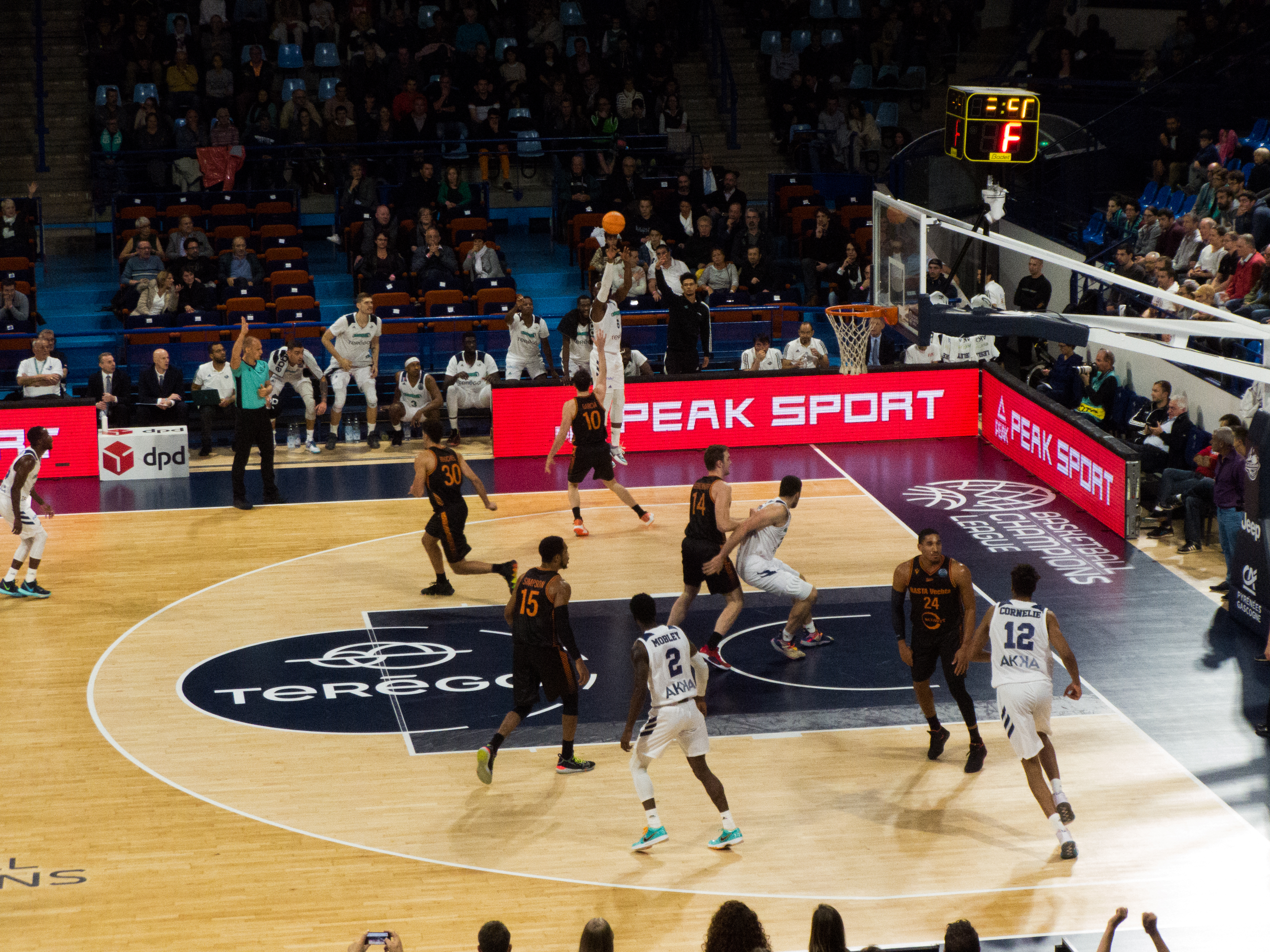
Élan playing Rasta Vechta in October 2019

In 2008, the club underwent a minor name-change for the second time in their history, becoming the Élan Béarnais Pau-Lacq-Orthez. The city of Lacq's inclusion in the name and entrance onto the director's board strengthened the club's Béarn identity. For their part, Lacq, located just north-west of Pau, now provides funding to the club.

== Arena ==
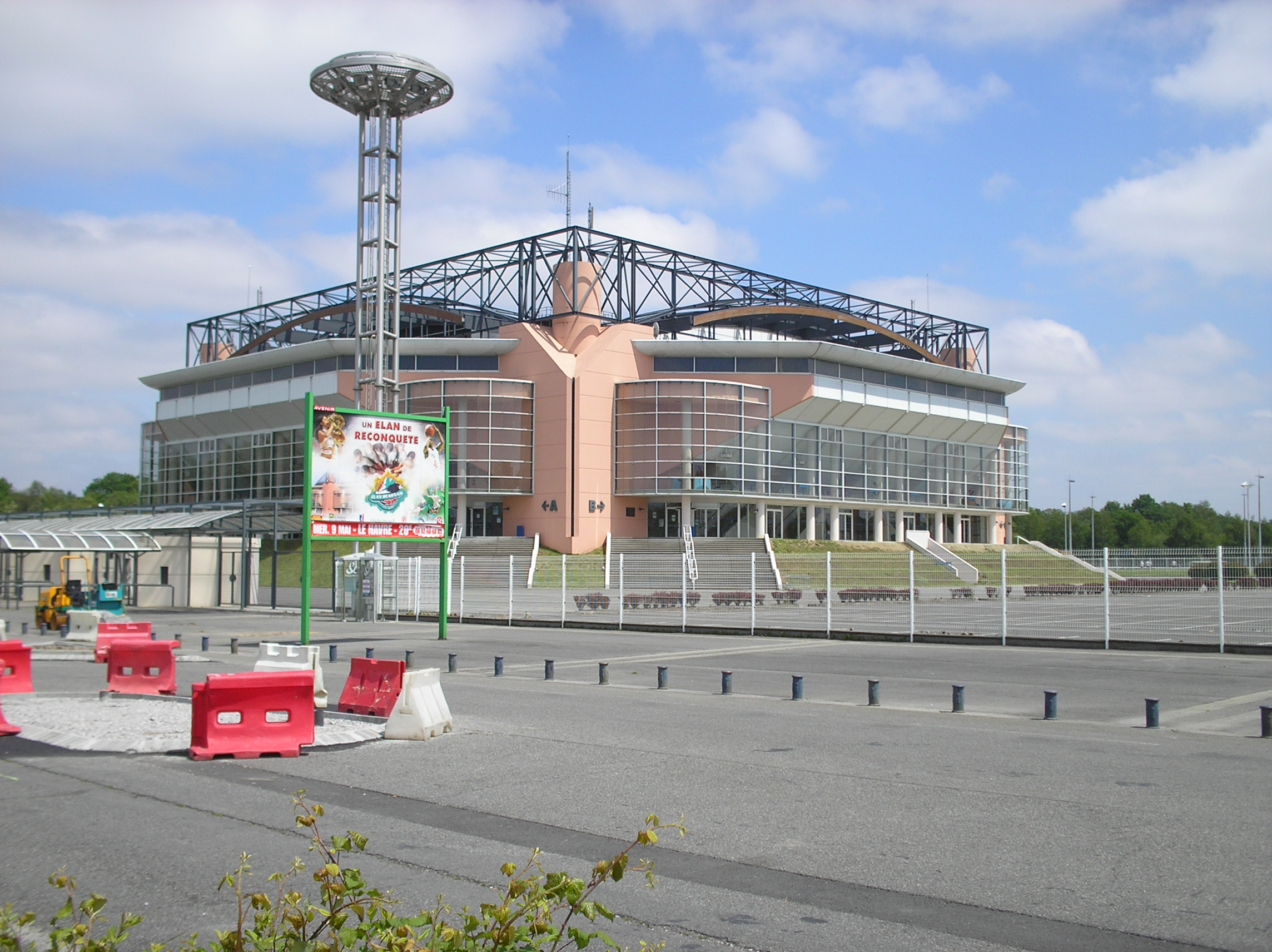
The Palais des Sports, the home arena of the team

Pau-Orthez play their home games at the Palais des Sports de Pau since 1991, which has a seating capacity of 7,707 people.

At Orthez, the club played their home games at La Moutète.

== Rivalries ==
The Élan Béarnais' biggest rival is Limoges CSP, another French club, and they have been trading blows with one another for supremacy on the hardwood, both figuratively and literally, since the early 1980s. In the 22 seasons between 1983 and 2004, the two clubs combined for 18 championships, and multiple games between the two teams resulted in fights amongst the players, including one that ended in a brawl between Élan supporters and Limoges players at their old Orthez venue, La Moutète. ASVEL is also a rival of the Élan Béarnais, and games against both of these teams are referred to as the "Clasicos" of French basketball, receiving hype from the media and fans.

== Players ==
=== Retired numbers ===
Élan Béarnais Pau-Lacq-Orthez retired numbers
No.	Nat.	Player	Position	Tenure
10	(France)	Didier Gadou	F	1982–2002

=== Current roster ===
Note: Flags indicate national team eligibility at FIBA-sanctioned events. Players may hold other non-FIBA nationalities not displayed.

Élan Béarnais Pau-Orthez roster
Players
Coaches

Pos.	No.	Nat.	Name	Ht.	Wt.	Age
PG	4	(France)	Milanese, Fabio	1.90 m (6 ft 3 in)	90 kg (198 lb)	22 – 3 December 2003
F	6	(France)	Mballa, Josh	2.01 m (6 ft 7 in)	100 kg (220 lb)	27 – 29 July 1999
PF	7	(France)	Noel, Gide	1.98 m (6 ft 6 in)	109 kg (240 lb)	33 – 22 February 1993
SG	9	(France)	Pinault, Bastien	1.96 m (6 ft 5 in)	87 kg (192 lb)	33 – 18 October 1993
C	10	(United States)	Middlebrooks, Ben	2.08 m (6 ft 10 in)	109 kg (240 lb)	24 – 16 October 2002
PG	12	(United States)	Flowers, Michael	1.85 m (6 ft 1 in)	86 kg (190 lb)	27 – 14 January 1999
G/F	15	(Slovenia)	Hrovat, Gregor	1.96 m (6 ft 5 in)	94 kg (207 lb)	32 – 18 August 1994
F/C	24	(France)	Assira Engoute, Nathan	2.00 m (6 ft 7 in)		17 – 9 December 2008
C	25	(United States)	Briggs, Justin	2.08 m (6 ft 10 in)	107 kg (236 lb)	29 – 19 September 1997
SG	32	(United States)	Maughmer, Jayvon	1.98 m (6 ft 6 in)	93 kg (205 lb)	25 – 30 October 2001
G	45	(France)	Cornely, Thomas	1.91 m (6 ft 3 in)		35 – 21 June 1991

Head coach

- (France) Mickaël Hay

Assistant coach(es)

- (France) Jimmy Durand
- (France) Adrien Demiselle

Team manager

- (France) Audrey Sauret

Legend

- (C) Team captain
- Injured

- Roster
Updated: November 8, 2026

=== Notable players ===
Note: Flags indicate national team eligibility at FIBA-sanctioned events. Players may hold other non-FIBA nationalities not displayed.

Criteria

To appear in this section a player must have either:

- Set a club record or won an individual award while at the club
- Played at least one official international match for their national team at any time
- Played at least one official NBA match at any time.

- (France) Yannick Bokolo
- (France) Howard Carter
- (France) Léopold Cavalière
- (France) Boris Diaw
- (France) Alain Digbeu
- (France) Frédéric Fauthoux
- (France) Laurent Foirest
- (France) Thomas Heurtel
- (France) Cyril Julian
- (France) Alpha Kaba
- (France) Alain Koffi
- (France) Ian Mahinmi
- (France) Élie Okobo
- (France) Johan Petro
- (France) Mickaël Piétrus
- (France) Florent Piétrus
- (France) Antoine Rigaudeau
- (France) Stéphane Risacher
- (France) Thierry Rupert
- (France) Laurent Sciarra
- (France) Moustapha Sonko
- (Belgium) Khalid Boukichou
- (Bulgaria) Hristo Nikolov
- (Cameroon) D. J. Strawberry
- (Dominican Republic) Ricardo Greer
- (Hungary) Akos Keller
- (Iran) Samad Nikkhah Bahrami
- (Jamaica) Sek Henry
- (North Macedonia) Vojdan Stojanovski
- (Nigeria) Chinemelu Elonu
- (Romania) Gheorghe Mureșan
- (Romania) Constantin Popa
- (Serbia) Dragan Lukovski
- (Serbia) Marko Simonović
- (United States) Marcus Brown
- (United States) Terry Catledge
- (United States) D. J. Cooper
- (United States) Corey Crowder
- (United States) Emanual Davis
- (United States) Justin Dentmon
- (United States) Andre Emmett
- (United States) Lawrence Funderburke
- (United States) Teddy Gipson
- (United States) Josh Grant
- (United States) Antonio Graves
- (United States) C.J. Harris
- (United States) Paul Henderson
- (United States) Mickey McConnell
- (United States) Conrad McRae
- (United States) Aaron Miles
- (United States) Ahmad Nivins
- (United States) Moochie Norris
- (United States) Orlando Phillips
- (United States) Taqwa Pinero
- (United States) Allan Ray
- (United States) Antywane Robinson
- (United States) Marc Salyers
- (United States) Tom Scheffler
- (United States) Rod Sellers
- (United States) Mustafa Shakur
- (United States) Michael Thompson
- (United States) C. J. Williams
- (United States) Michael Wright
- (Venezuela) John Cox
- (Venezuela) Donta Smith
- (Zimbabwe) Vitalis Chikoko

=== FIBA Hall of Famers ===
Élan Béarnais Hall of Famers
Players
No.	Nat.	Name	Position	Tenure	Inducted
11	(France)	Antoine Rigaudeau	G	1995–1997	2015

== Honours ==
Total titles: 19

=== Domestic competitions ===
- French League

Winners (9): 1985–86, 1986–87, 1991–92, 1995–96, 1997–98, 1998–99, 2000–01, 2002–03, 2003–04
Runners-up (4): 1988–89, 1992–93, 1994–95, 2001–02

- French Cup

Winners (4): 2001–02, 2002–03, 2006–07, 2021-22
Runners-up (2): 2000–01, 2003–04

- Leaders Cup

Winners (4): 1990–91, 1991–92, 1992–93, 2002-03

- French Super Cup

Winners (1): 2007

=== European competitions ===
- EuroLeague

3rd place (1): 1986–87

- FIBA Korać Cup (defunct)

Winners (1): 1983–84
Semifinalists (1): 1994–95

- European Super Cup (semi-official, defunct)

Runners-up (1): 1984

== Season by season ==
Season	Tier	Division	Pos.	W–L	French Cup	European competitions		
2009–10	2	Pro B	1st - Regular Season	33-8 - Playoffs Included				
2010–11	1	Pro A	9th - Regular Season	13–17 - Regular Season				
2011–12	1	Pro A	15th - Regular Season	7–23 - Regular Season		3 EuroChallenge	RS	1–5
2012–13	2	Pro B	2nd - Regular Season	28-11 - Playoffs Included				
2013–14	1	Pro A	11th - Regular Season	15–15 - Regular Season				
2014–15	1	Pro A	13th - Regular Season	13–21 - Regular Season				
2015–16	1	Pro A	7th - Regular Season	21–15 - Playoffs Included				
2016–17	1	Pro A	7th - Regular Season	23–14 - Playoffs Included		4 FIBA Europe Cup	R2	8–2
2017–18	1	Pro A	8th - Regular Season	18–18 - Playoffs Included	1st Round - (Lost 85-86 against Châlons-Reims)			
2018–19	1	Jeep ELITE	5th - Regular Season	22–15 - Playoffs Included	2nd Round - (Lost 88-92 against Chalon-sur-Saône)			
2019–20	1	Jeep ELITE	11th - Regular Season	10–15 - Regular Season (Less games due to COVID-19 Pandemic)		BCL	RS	5-9
2020–21	1	Jeep ELITE	11th - Regular Season	16–18 - Regular Season	1st Round - (Lost 81-83 against Tours)			
2021–22	1	Betclic ELITE	5th - Regular Season	22–18 - Playoffs Included	1st - (Won 95-86 against Strasbourg)			
2022–23	1	Betclic ELITE	14th - Regular Season (18 games left)	6–10 - 18 games left				

== The road to the 1983–84 FIBA Korać Cup victory ==
Round	Team	Home	Away
2nd round	(Greece) AEK	81–61	77–83
Top 16	(Italy) Star Varese	92–82	77–75
Top 16	(Socialist Federal Republic of Yugoslavia) Zadar	90–77	93–106
Top 16	(Greece) PAOK	73–58	78–83
Semi-finals	(France) Olympique Antibes	75–68	69–71
Final	(Socialist Federal Republic of Yugoslavia) Crvena zvezda	97–73	

== Kit manufacturer ==
2017-2021: PEAK
2021-2022: Adidas
2022-: Hummel

== Difficulties ==
In 2022 the club were embroiled in a scandal after Taqwa Pinero, a former player who had been appointed as General Manager of the club, was dismissed on the basis of his religious faith. According to the Sud-Ouest newspaper, Pinero was notified in early August of his dismissal of his duties at Elan Béarnais “for having displayed his Muslim faith on the social networks”. According to the same source, the mayor of Pau François Bayrou, was alleged to have pressured the owners of the club to oust Pinero.
