= 2017–18 Pro B season =

French basketball league season

- Season: 2017–18
- Teams: 18

Regular season
- Season MVP: (United States) Tyren Johnson
- Promoted: Blois; Fos Provence
- Relegated: Le Havre; Étoile Charleville-Mézières

Finals
- Champions: Blois (1st title)

Statistical leaders
| Points | (United States) Amin Stevens | 17.9 |
| Rebounds | (United States) Amin Stevens | 8.9 |
| Assists | (Puerto Rico) Alex Abreu | 6.5 |

The 2017–18 Pro B season was the 31st season of the Pro B, the top basketball league in France organised by the Ligue Nationale de Basket (LNB). Blois won its first league title.

== Teams ==
=== Promotion and relegation ===
Orléans Loiret and SLUC Nancy entered the league after they relegated from the 2016–17 Pro A season. UJAP Quimper 29 and Caen Basket Calvados were promoted from the 2016–17 NM1 season.

== Regular season ==
In the regular season, teams play against each other home-and-away in a round-robin format. The table leader will promote to the Pro A while the numbers two until nine qualify for the promotion playoffs. The last two placed teams are relegated to the NM1.

=== Standings ===
| Pos | Team | Pld | W | L | Qualification or relegation |
|---|---|---|---|---|---|
| 1 | ADA Blois 41 (C, P) | 34 | 27 | 7 | Promotion to Pro A |
| 2 | Chorale Roanne | 34 | 26 | 8 | Qualification for promotion playoffs |
| 3 | Orléans Loiret | 34 | 25 | 9 | Qualification for promotion playoffs |
| 4 | Fos Provence (O, P) | 34 | 24 | 10 | Qualification for promotion playoffs |
| 5 | Lille Métropole | 34 | 23 | 11 | Qualification for promotion playoffs |
| 6 | Saint-Chamond | 34 | 22 | 12 | Qualification for promotion playoffs |
| 7 | SLUC Nancy | 34 | 19 | 15 | Qualification for promotion playoffs |
| 8 | Rouen Métropole | 34 | 17 | 17 | Qualification for promotion playoffs |
| 9 | ALM Évreux | 34 | 16 | 18 | |
| 10 | Denain Voltaire (Note: Denain Voltaire automatically qualified for the playoffs as winners of the Leaders Cup.) | 34 | 16 | 18 | Qualification for promotion playoffs |
| 11 | AMSB | 34 | 15 | 19 | |
| 12 | JA Vichy-Clermont Métropole | 34 | 14 | 20 | |
| 13 | Hermine Nantes | 34 | 12 | 22 | |
| 14 | Caen Calvados | 34 | 12 | 22 | |
| 15 | UJAP Quimper 29 | 34 | 11 | 23 | |
| 16 | Poitiers 86 | 34 | 11 | 23 | |
| 17 | UJAP Quimper 29 | 34 | 11 | 23 | Relegation to NM1 |
| 18 | STB Le Havre | 34 | 10 | 24 | Relegation to NM1 |

Source: LNB (in French), Sportstats
(C) Champions; (O) Play-off winners; (P) Promoted

== Promotion playoffs ==
The seven highest ranked seeds in the regular season, excluding the league champions, qualify for the promotion playoffs. They are joined by the winner of the LNB Pro B Leaders Cup. All rounds of the promotion playoffs are played in a best-of-three format.

Quarterfinals
2 Chorale Roanne | 68 | 74
LC Denain Voltaire | 60 | 54
5 Lille Métropole | 81 | 80
6 Saint-Chamond | 65 | 56
3 Orléans | 112 | 76 | 85
8 Rouen Métropole | 110 | 77 | 86
4 Fos | 77 | 73
7 SLUC Nancy | 62 | 60

Semifinals
2 Chorale Roanne | 83 | 52 | 71
5 Lille Métropole | 36 | 77 | 55
8 Rouen Métropole | 75 | 70
4 Fos Provence | 79 | 92

Finals
2 Chorale Roanne | 68 | 70
4 Fos Provence | 72 | 76

== Pro B Leaders Cup ==
The winner of the LNB Pro B Leaders Cup automatically qualified for the promotion playoffs as the top seeded team. The quarter- and semi-finals in the Leaders Cup are played in two-legged format. The Final was played on 18 February in Disneyland Paris. Prior to the final eight teams, teams played in six groups of three teams to determine which teams would qualify for the quarter-finals.

Quarterfinals; 24–31 October
SLUC Nancy | 64 | 64 | 128
Denain Voltaire | 74 | 66 | 140
STB Le Havre | 81 | 64 | 145
Fos Provence | 73 | 69 | 142
ALM Évreux | 73 | 93 | 166
Orléans Loiret | 82 | 96 | 178
ADA Blois 41 | 85 | 71 | 156
Hermine Nantes | 87 | 72 | 159

Semifinals; 14 November–5 December
Denain Voltaire | 65 | 59 | 124
STB Le Havre | 65 | 91 | 156
Orléans Loiret | 68 | 92 | 160
Hermine Nantes | 59 | 78 | 137

Final; 18 February
Denain Voltaire (ot) | 98
Orléans Loiret | 87

== Individual awards ==
=== MVP of the Month ===
| Month | Player | Team | PIR | Ref. |
|---|---|---|---|---|
| October | (Bosnia and Herzegovina) Miralem Halilović | Orléans Loiret | 22.5 | |
| November | (Bosnia and Herzegovina) Miralem Halilović (2) | Orléans Loiret | 23.7 | |
| December | (United States) Jerrold Brooks | ADA Blois | 16.5 | |
| January | (United States) Tyren Johnson | ADA Blois | 22.0 | |
| February | (United States) Kammeon Hosley | UJAP Quimper 29 | 21.3 | |
| March | (Cameroon) Benoit Mbala | Chorale Roanne | 17.0 | |
| April | (France) Jonathan Hoyaux | Saint-Chamond | 19.0 | |
| May | (United States) Rakeem Buckels | Lille Métropole | 21.5 | |

== See also ==
- 2017–18 Pro A season
