= Élan Béarnais in international competitions =

French basketball club Élan Béarnais history and statistics in FIBA Europe and Euroleague Basketball competitions.

== European competitions ==
| Record | Round | Opponent club | | | |
|---|---|---|---|---|---|
1977–78 FIBA Korać Cup 3rd–tier
| 0–2 | 1st round | (Spain) Juventud Freixenet | 72–76 h | 79–116 a | |
1978–79 FIBA Korać Cup 3rd–tier
| 4–6 | 1st round | (Portugal) Ginásio Figueirense | 90–71 a | 99–78 h | |
| 4–6 | 2nd round | (Greece) Panathinaikos | 102–73 h | 67–88 a | |
| 4–6 | Top 16 | (Socialist Federal Republic of Yugoslavia) Cibona | 68–82 a | 76–88 h | |
| 4–6 | Top 16 | (Czechoslovakia) Inter Slovnaft | 84–75 h | 73–89 a | |
| 4–6 | Top 16 | (Italy) Arrigoni Rieti | 83–96 h | 69–100 a | |
1979–80 FIBA Korać Cup 3rd–tier
| 4–4 | 2nd round | (Italy) Jollycolombani Forlì | 68–76 a | 87–73 h | |
| 4–4 | Top 16 | (West Germany) Wolfenbüttel | 88–81 h | 83–80 a | |
| 4–4 | Top 16 | (Socialist Federal Republic of Yugoslavia) Cibona | 79–84 a | 84–88 h | |
| 4–4 | Top 16 | (Spain) Cotonificio | 87–75 h | 94–101 a | |
1980–81 FIBA Korać Cup 3rd–tier
| 6–2 | 2nd round | (Spain) Inmobanco | 99–71 h | 86–83 a | |
| 6–2 | Top 16 | (Belgium) Standard Liège | 88–85 a | 98–80 h | |
| 6–2 | Top 16 | (Soviet Union) Dynamo Moscow | 111–109 h | 112–117 a | |
| 6–2 | Top 16 | (Socialist Federal Republic of Yugoslavia) Zadar | 103–104 a | 92–91 h | |
1981–82 FIBA Korać Cup 3rd–tier
| 4–4 | 2nd round | (Belgium) Anderlecht | 86–93 a | 83–72 h | |
| 4–4 | Top 16 | (Italy) Cagiva Varese | 82–97 a | 102–77 h | |
| 4–4 | Top 16 | (Spain) Joventut Sony | 93–76 h | 83–95 a | |
| 4–4 | Top 16 | (Socialist Federal Republic of Yugoslavia) Zadar | 91–112 a | 108–105 h | |
1982–83 FIBA Korać Cup 3rd–tier
| 9–1 | 1st round | (Luxembourg) Amicale | 98–50 h | 82–42 a | |
| 9–1 | 2nd round | (Switzerland) Nyon | 93–77 a | 91–74 h | |
| 9–1 | Top 16 | (West Germany) Bayreuth | 81–74 a | 83–59 h | |
| 9–1 | Top 16 | (Socialist Federal Republic of Yugoslavia) Šibenka | 95–111 a | 79–74 h | |
| 9–1 | Top 16 | (Italy) Binova Cucine Rieti | 107–97 h | 95–84 a | |
1983–84 FIBA Korać Cup 3rd–tier
| 7–4 | 2nd round | (Greece) AEK | 77–83 a | 81–61 h | |
| 7–4 | Top 16 | (Italy) Star Varese | 77–75 a | 92–82 h | |
| 7–4 | Top 16 | (Socialist Federal Republic of Yugoslavia) Zadar | 90–77 h | 93–106 a | |
| 7–4 | Top 16 | (Greece) PAOK | 78–83 a | 73–58 h | |
| 7–4 | SF | (France) Olympique Antibes | 75–68 h | 69–71 a | |
| 7–4 | F | (Socialist Federal Republic of Yugoslavia) Crvena zvezda | 97–73; March 15, Palais des sports Pierre-de-Coubertin, Paris | | |
1984–85 FIBA Korać Cup 3rd–tier
| 5–1 | 2nd round | Bye | Orthez qualified without games | | |
| 5–1 | Top 16 | (Spain) Clesa Ferrol | 97–76 h | 91–90 a | |
| 5–1 | Top 16 | (Italy) Ciaocrem Varese | 75–99 a | 82–66 h | |
| 5–1 | Top 16 | (Belgium) Renault Gent | 127–73 h | 99–83 a | |
1985–86 FIBA Korać Cup 3rd–tier
| 3–3 | 2nd round | Bye | Orthez qualified without games | | |
| 3–3 | Top 16 | (Spain) Cacaolat Granollers | 91–75 a | 95–85 h | |
| 3–3 | Top 16 | (Italy) Mobilgirgi Caserta | 78–83 a | 79–86 h | |
| 3–3 | Top 16 | (Socialist Federal Republic of Yugoslavia) Partizan | 103–105 h | 105–94 a | |
1986–87 FIBA European Champions Cup 1st–tier
| 10–4 | 1st round | (Albania) Partizani Tirana | 73–63 a | 85–82 h | |
| 10–4 | 2nd round | (West Germany) Bayer 04 Leverkusen | 84–76 a | 81–66 h | |
| 10–4 | SF | (Italy) Tracer Milano | 75–73 h | 75–84 a | |
| 10–4 | SF | (Spain) Real Madrid | 95–87 a | 84–82 h | |
| 10–4 | SF | (Israel) Maccabi Tel Aviv | 78–77 h | 87–106 a | |
| 10–4 | SF | (Socialist Federal Republic of Yugoslavia) Zadar | 64–70 a | 73–69 h | |
| 10–4 | SF | (Soviet Union) Žalgiris | 94–80 h | 84–94 a | |
1987–88 FIBA European Champions Cup 1st–tier
| 6–10 | Top 16 | (Turkey) Karşıyaka | 124–82 h | 88–85 a | |
| 6–10 | QF | (Greece) Aris | 86–92 a | 97–81 h | |
| 6–10 | QF | (West Germany) Saturn Köln | 105–95 h | 75–84 a | |
| 6–10 | QF | (Socialist Federal Republic of Yugoslavia) Partizan | 89–94 a | 70–73 h | |
| 6–10 | QF | (Netherlands) Nashua EBBC | 87–96 a | 112–100 h | |
| 6–10 | QF | (Italy) Tracer Milano | 78–80 h | 77–87 a | |
| 6–10 | QF | (Israel) Maccabi Tel Aviv | 78–92 a | 82–91 h | |
| 6–10 | QF | (Spain) FC Barcelona | 95–83 h | 79–81 a | |
1988–89 FIBA Korać Cup 3rd–tier
| 5–3 | 2nd round | (Bulgaria) Spartak Pleven | 106–95 a | 106–83 h | |
| 5–3 | Top 16 | (Italy) Wiwa Vismara Cantù | 86–100 a | 96–102 h | |
| 5–3 | Top 16 | (Netherlands) Direktbank Den Helder | 87–86 h | 99–79 a | |
| 5–3 | Top 16 | (Soviet Union) Stroitel | 110–112 a | 91–90 h | |
1989–90 FIBA Korać Cup 3rd–tier
| 5–5 | 1st round | (Switzerland) Fribourg Olympic | 102–94 a | 102–70 h | |
| 5–5 | 2nd round | (Iceland) KR | 97–78 a | 102–75 h | |
| 5–5 | Top 16 | (Spain) Ram Joventut | 76–93 a | 78–87 h | |
| 5–5 | Top 16 | (Italy) Scavolini Pesaro | 67–98 a | 86–89 h | |
| 5–5 | Top 16 | (Socialist Federal Republic of Yugoslavia) Zadar | 87–85 h | 102–119 a | |
1990–91 FIBA Korać Cup 3rd–tier
| 1–1 | 1st round | (Belgium) Sunair Oostende | 80–100 a | 109–95 h | |
1991–92 FIBA European Cup 2nd–tier
| 7–5 | 2nd round | (Romania) Universitatea Cluj | 101–107 a | 100–89 h | |
| 7–5 | 3rd round | Bye | Pau-Orthez qualified without games | | |
| 7–5 | Top 12 | (Greece) Panionios | 76–101 a | 87–82 h | |
| 7–5 | Top 12 | (Israel) Hapoel Galil Elyon | 108–103 h | 101–108 a | |
| 7–5 | Top 12 | (Spain) Real Madrid | 83–79 a | 90–96 h | |
| 7–5 | Top 12 | (Slovenia) Smelt Olimpija | 89–73 h | 86–88 a | |
| 7–5 | Top 12 | (Portugal) Benfica | 89–80 h | 90–79 a | |
1992–93 FIBA European League 1st–tier
| 10–8 | 2nd round | (Turkey) Efes Pilsen | 67–65 a | 64–55 h | |
| 10–8 | Top 16 | (Belgium) Maes Pils | 107–103 h | 75–73 a | |
| 10–8 | Top 16 | (Spain) Estudiantes Caja Postal | 84–82 a | 71–68 h | |
| 10–8 | Top 16 | (Germany) Bayer 04 Leverkusen | 82–85 h | 78–73 a | |
| 10–8 | Top 16 | (Greece) Olympiacos | 96–93 a | 64–65 h | |
| 10–8 | Top 16 | (Spain) Real Madrid | 71–85 a | 67–70 h | |
| 10–8 | Top 16 | (Croatia) Zadar | 85–75 h | 86–89 a | |
| 10–8 | Top 16 | (Italy) Benetton Treviso | 65–84 a | 82–55 h | |
| 10–8 | QF | (Greece) PAOK | 86–103 h | 65–81 a | – a |
1993–94 FIBA European League 1st–tier
| 5–11 | 2nd round | (North Macedonia) Rabotnički | 86–74 a | 91–89 h | |
| 5–11 | Top 16 | (Turkey) Efes Pilsen | 74–81 a | 56–68 h | |
| 5–11 | Top 16 | (Italy) Clear Cantù | 115–82 h | 66–94 a | |
| 5–11 | Top 16 | (Italy) Buckler Bologna | 61–76 a | 70–79 h | |
| 5–11 | Top 16 | (Croatia) Cibona | 80–91 a | 81–106 h | |
| 5–11 | Top 16 | (Spain) 7up Joventut | 82–92 h | 66–78 a | |
| 5–11 | Top 16 | (Greece) Panathinaikos | 72–86 a | 75–70 h | |
| 5–11 | Top 16 | (Portugal) Benfica | 72–80 h | 74–72 a | |
1994–95 FIBA Korać Cup 3rd–tier
| 8–4 | 2nd round | Bye | Pau-Orthez qualified without games | | |
| 8–4 | 3rd round | (Croatia) Šibenik | 90–62 a | 78–69 h | |
| 8–4 | Top 16 | (Germany) Alba Berlin | 101–82 a | 78–80 h | |
| 8–4 | Top 16 | (Spain) Estudiantes Caja Postal | 86–77 h | 80–79 a | |
| 8–4 | Top 16 | (Italy) Birex Verona | 91–86 a | 62–56 h | |
| 8–4 | QF | (Turkey) Ülker | 65–72 a | 88–73 h | |
| 8–4 | SF | (Italy) Stefanel Milano | 76–82 h | 85–90 a | |
1995–96 FIBA European League 1st–tier
| 13–8 | 1st round | (Netherlands) Rene Coltof Den Helder | 94–72 a | 88–57 h | |
| 13–8 | 2nd round | (Slovenia) Smelt Olimpija | 96–71 h | 97–75 a | |
| 13–8 | Top 16 | (Israel) Maccabi Tel Aviv | 88–91 a | 90–66 h | |
| 13–8 | Top 16 | (Portugal) Benfica | 76–61 h | 90–99 a | |
| 13–8 | Top 16 | (Italy) Buckler Bologna | 102–99 a | 74–69 h | |
| 13–8 | Top 16 | (Greece) Panathinaikos | 79–87 h | 69–67 a | |
| 13–8 | Top 16 | (Spain) Real Madrid | 94–75 h | 64–76 a | |
| 13–8 | Top 16 | (Spain) FC Barcelona | 61–87 a | 82–70 h | |
| 13–8 | Top 16 | (Croatia) Cibona | 78–83 a | 80–62 h | |
| 13–8 | QF | (Russia) CSKA Moscow | 78–65 h | 89–104 a | 74–83 a |
1996–97 FIBA EuroLeague 1st–tier
| 6–10 | 1st round | (Russia) Dynamo Moscow | 65–70 a | 94–71 h | |
| 6–10 | 1st round | (Spain) Caja San Fernando | 85–79 h | 69–61 a | |
| 6–10 | 1st round | (Federal Republic of Yugoslavia) Partizan | 75–84 a | 73–77 h | |
| 6–10 | 1st round | (Turkey) Efes Pilsen | 80–78 h | 76–78 a | |
| 6–10 | 1st round | (Italy) Kinder Bologna | 89–83 h | 74–86 a | |
| 6–10 | 2nd round | (France) ASVEL | 95–97 h | 65–67 a | |
| 6–10 | 2nd round | (Slovenia) Smelt Olimpija | 86–96 a | 77–71 h | |
| 6–10 | 2nd round | (Greece) Panathinaikos | 66–78 h | 71–75 a | |
1997–98 FIBA EuroLeague 1st–tier
| 6–10 | 1st round | (Spain) FC Barcelona | 94–95 h | 62–85 a | |
| 6–10 | 1st round | (Italy) Kinder Bologna | 79–72 a | 65–67 h | |
| 6–10 | 1st round | (Turkey) Ülker | 64–67 a | 77–76 h | |
| 6–10 | 1st round | (Israel) Hapoel Jerusalem | 73–65 h | 79–67 a | |
| 6–10 | 1st round | (Federal Republic of Yugoslavia) Partizan | 72–86 a | 74–70 h | |
| 6–10 | 2nd round | (Germany) Alba Berlin | 55–66 a | 94–75 h | |
| 6–10 | 2nd round | (France) PSG Racing | 61–64 h | 51–70 a | |
| 6–10 | 2nd round | (Slovenia) Union Olimpija | 68–71 a | 76–77 h | |
