= Thierry Zig =

French basketball player

Personal information
- Born: July 4, 1975 (age 51) Bondy
- Listed height: 6 ft 3 in (1.91 m)
- Listed weight: 190 lb (86 kg)

Career information
- Playing career: 1994–2012
- Position: guard-forward

Thierry Zig (born July 4, 1975 in Bondy, Seine-Saint-Denis) is a French former professional basketball player.

== Career ==
- 1994-1995: (France) Levallois: 6g 0.7ppg 0.3rpg
- 1995-1996: (France) Levallois: 26g 3.2ppg 0.4rpg 1.0apg
- 1996-1997: (France) Levallois: 29g 10.2ppg 1.8rpg 2.0apg
- 1997-1998: (France) Paris Basket Racing: 5.2ppg, 1.6rpg, 1.6apg
- 1998-1999: (France) Paris Basket Racing: 7.5ppg, 1apg
- 1999-2000: (France) Paris Basket Racing: 4.9ppg
- 2000: Nike Summer League in Treviso (ITA): All-Star Team
- 2000-2001: (France) Paris Basket Racing (1T): 7.1ppg, 2rpg, 1.5apg; Saporta Cup: 13.6ppg, 2.2rpg, 1.1apg
- 2001-2002: (France) Strasbourg IG, in Dec.'01 signed at Gijón Baloncesto (ESP-ACB): ACB Regular Season stats: 20 games: 6.4ppg, 1.2rpg, 13ast
- 2002-2003: (Spain) Unicaja Málaga (ESP-ACB): Euroleague: 2 games: 4.0ppg, 2reb; Spanish ACB League: 2 games: 1.5ppg, 0reb, 3.0apg, 1.0spg, then at CB Granada (ESP-ACB): 9 games: 5.1ppg, 1.0rpg, 7ast, shortly at Paris BR (ProA): 6 games: 7.8ppg, 4reb, 3ast, in April '03 signed at CB Tarragona (ESP-LEB1): 2 games: 14.0ppg, 1.0apg
- 2003-2004: (France) Paris Basket Racing (ProA): FIBA Europe Cup: 2 games: 9.5ppg, 2.0rpg, 1ast; French ProA League: 5 games: 9.2ppg, 2.6rpg, 1.2apg, in Dec.'03 was tested at Sicilia Messina (ITA-SerieA), in Feb.'04 signed at J.D.A. Dijon (ProA); French ProA League: 14 games: 6.1ppg, 1.4rpg, 1.6apg
- 2004 July: (United States) Southern California Summer Pro League in Long Beach, CA (San Antonio Spurs)
- 2004-2005: (Italy) Basket Livorno (SerieA): 34 games: 5.3ppg, 1.7rpg, 2FGP: 51.2%, 3FGP: 32.5%
- 2005-2006: (Italy) Viola Reggio Calabria (SerieA): 26 games: 6.2ppg, 2.2rpg, 1.0apg, 1.0spg, 2FGP: 36.7%, 3PT: 32.7%, FT: 58.8%
- 2006-2007: (Czech Republic) In Dec.'06 signed at Mlekarna Kunin Novi Jicin (CZE-NBL), left next month
- 2008-2009: (France) Boulazac (ProB): 19 games: 12ppg, 2 apg, 2FGP: 34%, 3PT: 43%, FT: 68%
