= Levallois Sporting Club Basket =

- Leagues: Nationale Masculine 1
- Founded: 1941; 85 years ago
- History: 1941–present
- Arena: Palais des sports Marcel-Cerdan
- Capacity: 4,000
- Location: Levallois, Paris, France
- Team colors: Yellow and Blue
- Championships: French 2nd Division (2)
- Website: basket-levallois-sporting-club.fr
Home	Away

Levallois Sporting Club Basket, abbreviated as either LCB Basket or Levallois SCB, is a French basketball club that is based in Levallois, Paris, France. It is the men's basketball section of the French multi-sport club Levallois Sporting Club.

== History ==
Levallois Sporting Club Basket was founded in 1941. The club played in the minor league level divisions of French basketball league system until 1969, when it qualified for a place in the French Second Division. After that, the club soon made it up to the top-level French First Division. In 1992, the club won the French Second Division title.

In pan-European competition, Levallois SCB played in the European-wide 3rd-tier level league, the FIBA Korać Cup, in the 1996–97 season. They won the French Second Division title again in 1998. Levallois SCB played in the French 2nd Division in the 2006–07 season. Following that, Levallois Sporting Club Basket merged with Paris Basket Racing, to form a new version of Paris Basket Racing called Paris-Levallois Basket.

Since then, Levallois SCB has competed in the French men's amateur level minor leagues, and in junior age competitions.

== Arenas ==
Levallois Sporting Club Basket plays its national domestic home league games at the 4,000 seat Palais de Sports Marcel Cerdan. Over the years, the club has also played home games at the 4,200 seat Stade Pierre de Coubertin.

== Titles and honors ==
=== Domestic competitions ===
- French 2nd Division

Champions (2): 1991–92, 1997–98

- French Federation Cup

Runners-up (2): 1995–96, 1997–98

== Notable players ==
Note: Flags indicate national team eligibility at FIBA-sanctioned events. Players may hold other non-FIBA nationalities not displayed.

Criteria

To appear in this section a player must have either:

- Set a club record or won an individual award while at the club
- Played at least one official international match for their national team at any time
- Played at least one official NBA match at any time.

- (France) Sacha Giffa
- (France) Freddy Hufnagel
- (France) Stéphane Lauvergne
- (France) Vincent Masingue
- (France) Moustapha Sonko
- (France) Thierry Zig
- (United States) Michael Brooks
- (United States) Wendell Alexis
- (United States) Ronnie Burrell
- (United States) Larry Krystkowiak
- (United States) Garry Plummer
- (United States) James Scott
- (United States) Terence Stansbury

== See also ==
- Paris Basket Racing
- Metropolitans 92
