= Jacques Alingue =

French basketball player (born 1988)

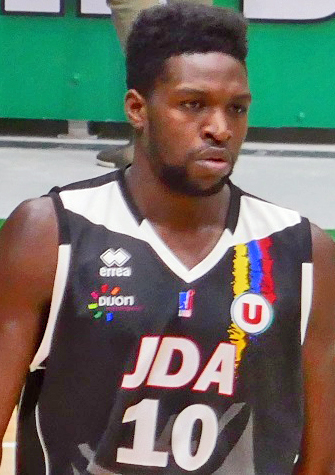

No. 10 – ADA Blois Basket 41
- Position: Power forward / center
- League: LNB Pro B

Personal information
- Born: April 30, 1988 (age 38) Avranches, France
- Listed height: 6 ft 7 in (2.01 m)
- Listed weight: 215 lb (98 kg)

Career information
- NBA draft: 2010: undrafted
- Playing career: 2007–present

Career history
- 2007–2009: Haguenau
- 2009-2014: BC Souffelweyersheim
- 2014–2015: JDA Dijon
- 2015: Hyères-Toulon
- 2015–2018: JDA Dijon
- 2018–2019: SIG Strasbourg
- 2019–2020: Le Mans
- 2020–2024: JDA Dijon
- 2024–present: ADA Blois

Jacques Alingue (born April 30, 1988) is a Chadian-French professional basketball player for ADA Blois of the LNB Pro A.

== Professional career ==
In 2013–14, he averaged 8.9 points, 8 rebounds, 1.7 assists, and 1.7 steals per game for BC Souffelweyersheim in the Pro B. In June 2014, he signed with JDA Dijon. He moved to Hyères-Toulon for the playoffs in 2015 but rejoined Dijon the following season. Alingue posted 7 points and 4 rebounds per game in 2015-16. After the season, he re-signed with Dijon. He was injured in 2018.

On May 21, 2020, he signed with JDA Dijon Basket of the LNB Pro A.

On June 3, 2024, he signed with ADA Blois of the LNB Pro A.

== Chad national team ==
Alingue has represented Chad internationally.
