= Gainesville Knights =

The Gainesville Knights were a franchise in the World Basketball Association. They played at Gainesville High School's gymnasium.

== 2005 ==
The Knights could be considered an extension of the Raleigh Knights, who played in the WBA in the 2004 season. When the Knights opted not to return for the 2005 season, the league scrambled for a replacement franchise, this franchise was awarded to Gainesville, and is co-owned by Curtis Richardson and Arthur Crawford. The team announced that they would be coached by Jim Price. The Knights underwent two coaching changes after a hot start. Price was replaced by co-owned Richardson, and Ricky Benitez, former Southern Crescent Lightning coach was hired to replace him. The team finished 8–16, and missed out on a playoff berth.

== 2006 ==
The Knights announced in December 2005 that they would be returning for a second season, with Benitez returning as head coach. However, as of January 11, Benitez was removed from consideration for the head coaching job.

== Related links ==
- OSC page
