= Metropolitans Basketball Club =

Basketball club in France

- Nickname: Mets Basketball Club
- Leagues: Élite 2
- Founded: 9 June 2007; 19 years ago
- History: Paris-Levallois Basket (2007–2017); Levallois Metropolitans (2017–2019); Metropolitans 92 (2019–2024); Metropolitans Basketball Club (2024–present)
- Arena: Marcel Cerdan Sports Palace
- Capacity: 4,000
- Location: Levallois-Perret, Hauts-de-Seine, France
- Team colors: Navy blue, Gold
- President: Luc Dayan
- Head coach: Sacha Giffa
- Championships: 1 French Federation Cup; 1 French Supercup
- Website: metropolitansbasketball.com
Home	Away	Third

Metropolitans Basketball Club (commonly referred as Metropolitans), is a French professional basketball club that is based in Levallois-Perret, in the Paris metropolitan area. The club was established in 2007, as Paris-Levallois Basket. Their home arena is the Palais des sports Marcel-Cerdan, which has a seating capacity of 4,000 people. Levallois has won two titles thus far, winning the French Federation Cup and the Match des Champions (French Supercup), both in 2013.

The team is best known for being the former club of Victor Wembanyama, who was selected first overall in the 2023 NBA draft after his sole season with Metropolitans, and became one of the best players in the National Basketball Association (NBA). In 2024, after finishing in last place of the Élite 2, the team was relegated to the Nationale Masculine 1.

== History ==
The club was founded in 2007, with the merger of Paris Basket Racing, from the city of Paris, and Levallois Sporting Club Basket, from the nearby commune of Levallois-Perret, and started to play with the name of Paris-Levallois Basket. The club retains all of the history and titles of Paris Basket Racing and Levallois Sporting Club Basket.

Despite beginning in the top-tier level of French basketball, the LNB Pro A, Paris-Levallois was relegated to the French second-tier level LNB Pro B, after finishing second from the bottom in the 2007–08 season. The club returned to the Pro A at the first opportunity, by claiming the league promotion from the Pro B in the 2008–09 season. Since then, the club has played in the top tier of French basketball.

On 5 July 2017, the club's board of directors agreed to change the name of the club to Levallois Metropolitans. On 4 July 2019, former NBA player Boris Diaw was announced as the club's new president, succeeding Jean-Pierre Aubry.

In the 2022–23 season, French young star Victor Wembanyama joined the team from ASVEL. Wenbanyama was widely projected to be the number one pick in the 2023 NBA draft. In October 2022, the Metropolitans 92 played two exhibition games against the NBA G League Ignite in the United States, giving the club greater international exposure. In the 2023 NBA draft, two of the team's players were selected in the top 10 of the draft, with Victor Wembanyama being selected #1 by the San Antonio Spurs and Bilal Coulibaly being selected seventh overall by the Indiana Pacers and then traded to the Washington Wizards.

The following season after Wembanyama's departure, Metropolitans struggled in the 2023–24 LNB Élite season. The team finished last in the league standing and was relegated to the LNB Pro B. The team's mother organization was previously funded by the Boulogne-Billancourt municipality, however, the municipality decided to cut the basketball club from its costs and searched for investors that were interested in purchasing the team. In May 2024, it was announced that the team had gone bankrupt. However, in order to mitigate the problem, the club decided to drop out of playing in the LNB Pro B that season and instead demote themselves further downward into the Nationale Masculine 1.

== Arenas ==
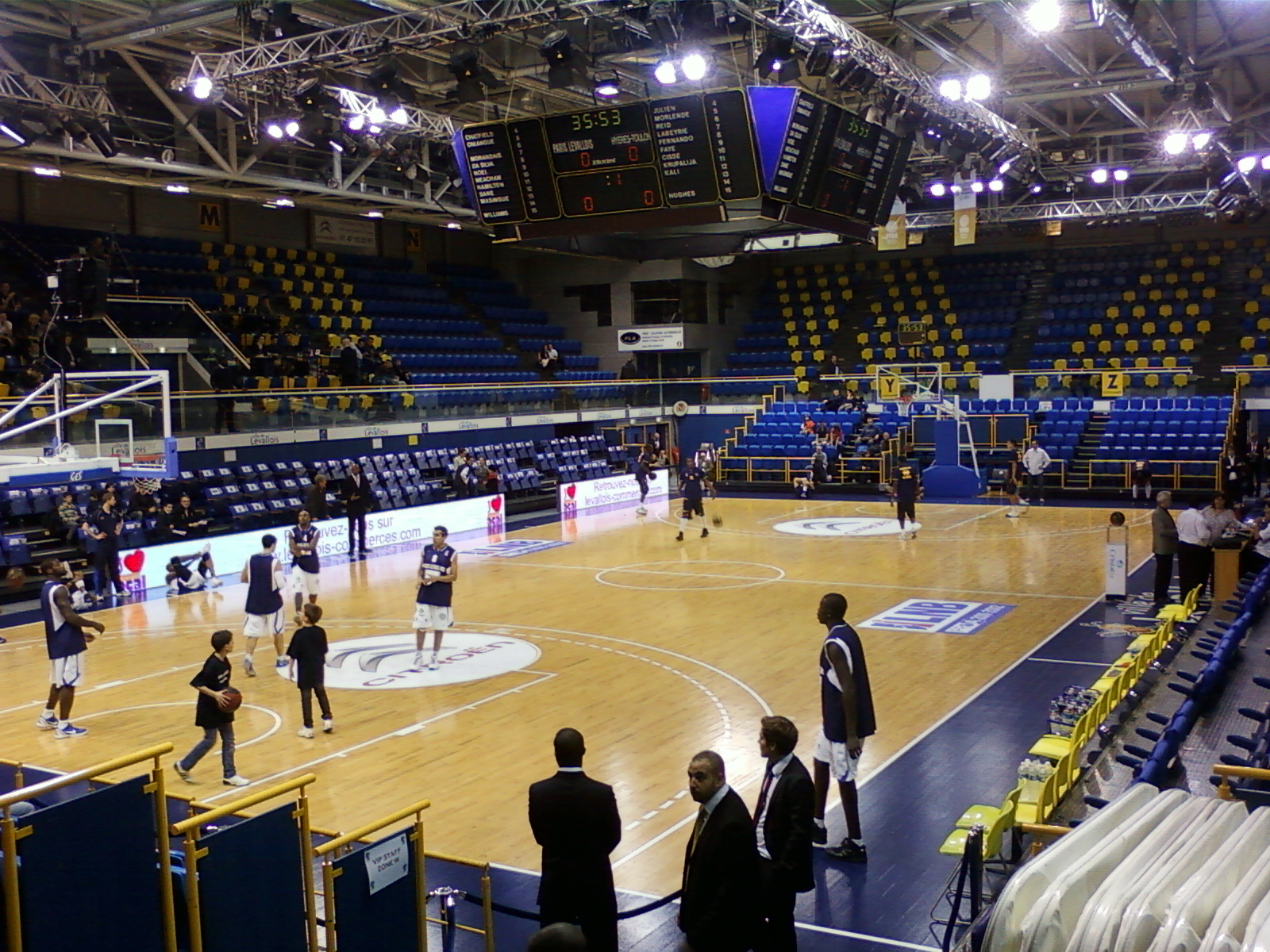
The Palais des sports Marcel-Cerdan in November 2011

Metropolitans play their home games at the 4,000 seat Palais des sports Marcel Cerdan. Over the years, the club has also used the 4,200 seat Stade Pierre de Coubertin, as its home venue.

== Honours and titles ==
=== Domestic competitions ===
- French Federation Cup
  - Winners (1): 2012–13
- Match des Champions (French Supercup)
  - Winners (1): 2013
- Tournoi de Toulouse
  - Winners (1): 2014

== Season by season ==
Season	Tier	League	Pos.	French Cup	Leaders Cup	European competitions	
2007–08	1	Pro A	15th	Round of 32			
2008–09	2	Pro B	2nd	Round of 16			
2009–10	1	Pro A	7th	Round of 32			
2010–11	1	Pro A	13th	Round of 16		3 EuroChallenge	QR
2011–12	1	Pro A	6th	Round of 32	Quarterfinalist		
2012–13	1	Pro A	12th	Champion	Semifinalist	3 EuroChallenge	QF
2013–14	1	Pro A	6th	Quarterfinalist	Semifinalist	2 Eurocup	RS
2014–15	1	Pro A	11th	Round of 16			
2015–16	1	Pro A	14th	Round of 16			
2016–17	1	Pro A	3rd	Round of 16			
2017–18	1	Pro A	10th	Semifinalist		2 EuroCup	RS
2018–19	1	Pro A	12th	Semifinalist			
2019–20	1	Pro A	4th	Quarterfinalist			
2020–21	1	Pro A	6th	Quarterfinalist		2 EuroCup	QF
2021–22	1	Pro A	3rd	Quarterfinalist		2 EuroCup	QF

== Players ==
=== Current roster ===
Note: Flags indicate national team eligibility at FIBA-sanctioned events. Players may hold other non-FIBA nationalities not displayed.

Metropolitans Basketball Club roster
Players
Coaches

Pos.	No.	Nat.	Name	Ht.	Age
G	0	(France) (United States)	Milling, Kane	1.93 m (6 ft 4 in)	25 – 11 March 2001
F	1	(France)	Adzeh, Craig	2.05 m (6 ft 9 in)	23 – 26 May 2003
G	2	(Cameroon) (United States)	Minlend Jr., Charles	1.93 m (6 ft 4 in)	28 – 19 December 1997
G	3	(France)	Giffa, Kezza	1.85 m (6 ft 1 in)	24 – 13 November 2002
G	7	(France)	Thalien, Kevin	1.90 m (6 ft 3 in)	34 – 20 February 1992
SF	8	(France) (Spain)	Digbeu, Tom	1.99 m (6 ft 6 in)	25 – 24 September 2001
SF	10	(Republic of the Congo)	Oniangue, Giovan	1.98 m (6 ft 6 in)	35 – 22 April 1991
SF	11	(United States)	Stansbury, Solly	2.01 m (6 ft 7 in)	31 – 6 March 1995
C	19	(France)	Colson, Lionel	2.06 m (6 ft 9 in)	24 – 5 May 2002
C	21	(United States)	Moore Jr., Clifton	2.11 m (6 ft 11 in)	27 – 18 August 1999
F	25	(France)	Kamdem, Hugo	2.01 m (6 ft 7 in)	23 – 10 December 2002
G	44	(France)	Tchicamboud, Jayson	1.95 m (6 ft 5 in)	24 – 28 January 2002
G	47	(Ivory Coast)	Dadiet, Maxence	1.92 m (6 ft 4 in)	27 – 2 March 1999
SF	55	(France)	Konaté, Lahaou	1.98 m (6 ft 6 in)	35 – 17 November 1991

Head coach

- (France) Sacha Giffa

Assistant coach(es)

- (France) Colin Tejedor
- (France) Steeve Essart

Legend

- (C) Team captain
- Injured

- Roster
Updated: November 16, 2026

== Notable players ==
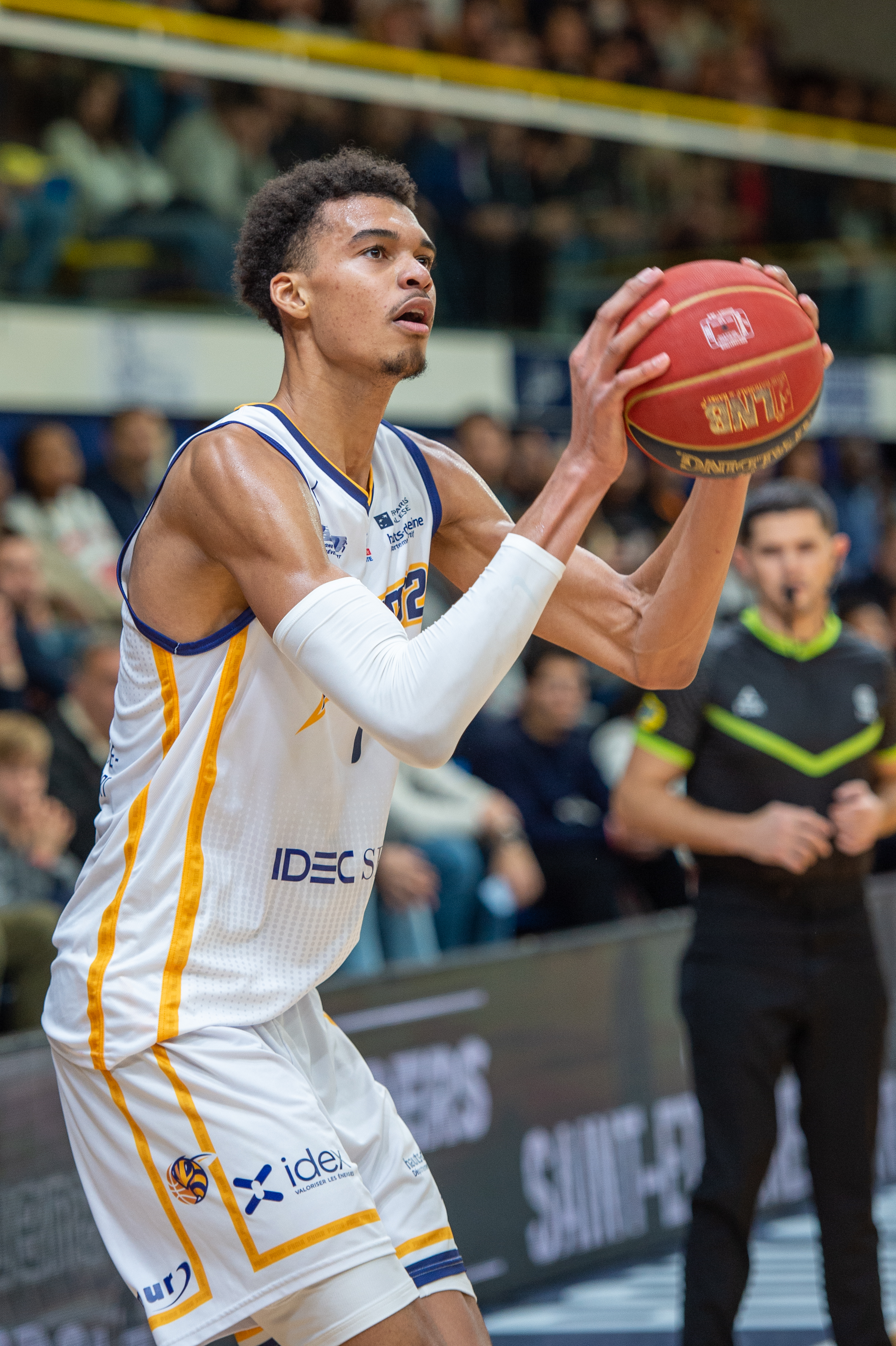
Victor Wembanyama became the breakout player for the team during the 2022–23 season and lead the Pro A each category of points, rebounds, and blocks. He won the LNB Pro A Best Defender, LNB Pro A Best Scorer, LNB Pro A Best Young Player (which Wembanyama won three straight), and Best Blocker. He was the youngest player to won a LNB Pro A MVP and also selected as LNB All-Star Game as a team captain which he also won the All-Star Game's MVP. Due to his performance, he was selected first overall pick in the 2023 NBA draft with the San Antonio Spurs.

Note: Flags indicate national team eligibility at FIBA-sanctioned events. Players may hold other non-FIBA nationalities not displayed.

Criteria

To appear in this section a player must have either:

- Set a club record or won an individual award while at the club
- Played at least one official international match for their national team at any time
- Played at least one official NBA match at any time.

France:
- (France) Cyril Akpomedah
- (France) Andrew Albicy
- (France) Nobel Boungou Colo
- (France) Bilal Coulibaly
- (France) Boris Diaw
- (France) Antoine Diot
- (France) Vasco Evtimov
- (France) Louis Labeyrie
- (France) Nicolas Lang
- (France) Michel Morandais
- (France) Florent Piétrus
- (France) Vincent Poirier
- (France) Landing Sané
- (France) Steed Tchicamboud
- (France) Angelo Tsagarakis
- (France) Victor Wembanyama

Europe:

- (Israel) Tomer Ginat
- (Slovenia) Jurica Golemac
- (Serbia) Branko Milisavljević
- (Slovenia) Jordan Morgan
- (Slovenia) Klemen Prepelič
- (Czech Republic) Blake Schilb
- (Croatia) Roko Ukić

USA:

- (United States) Jamel Artis
- (United States) Anthony Brown
- (United States) Louis Campbell
- (United States) Eric Chatfield
- (United States) Daniel Ewing
- (United States) Sharrod Ford
- (United States) Taj Gray
- (United States) Mike Green
- (United States) Lamont Hamilton
- (United States) Jaron Johnson
- (United States) Sean May
- (United States) Jordan McRae
- (United States) Trenton Meacham
- (United States) David Noel
- (United States) Jason Rich
- (United States) Gavin Ware
- (United States) Brianté Weber
- (United States) Jawad Williams
- (United States) Julian Wright

Rest of Americas:

- (Venezuela) John Cox
- (Canada) Prosper Karangwa
- (Venezuela) Donta Smith
- (Puerto Rico) Ángel Daniel Vassallo

Africa:

- (Nigeria) Aloysius Anagonye
- (Senegal) Maleye N'Doye
- (Republic of the Congo) Giovan Oniangue
- (Nigeria) Rasheed Sulaimon
- (Benin) Mouphtaou Yarou

Oceania:

- (Australia) Nathan Jawai

== Head coaches ==
- (Greece) Ilias Zouros: (2007–2008)
- (France) Jean-Marc Dupraz: (2008, 2008–2011)
- (United States) Ron Stewart: (2008)
- (France) Christophe Denis: (2011–2013)
- (France) Gregor Beugnot: (2013–2015)
- (France) Antoine Rigaudeau: (2015)
- (France) Frédéric Fauthoux: (2015–2020)
- (Slovenia) Jure Zdovc: (2020–2021)
- (France) Vincent Collet: (2021–2024)

== See also ==
- Levallois Sporting Club Basket
- Paris Basket Racing
