= Palais des Sports de Pau =

Indoor sporting arena in Pau, France

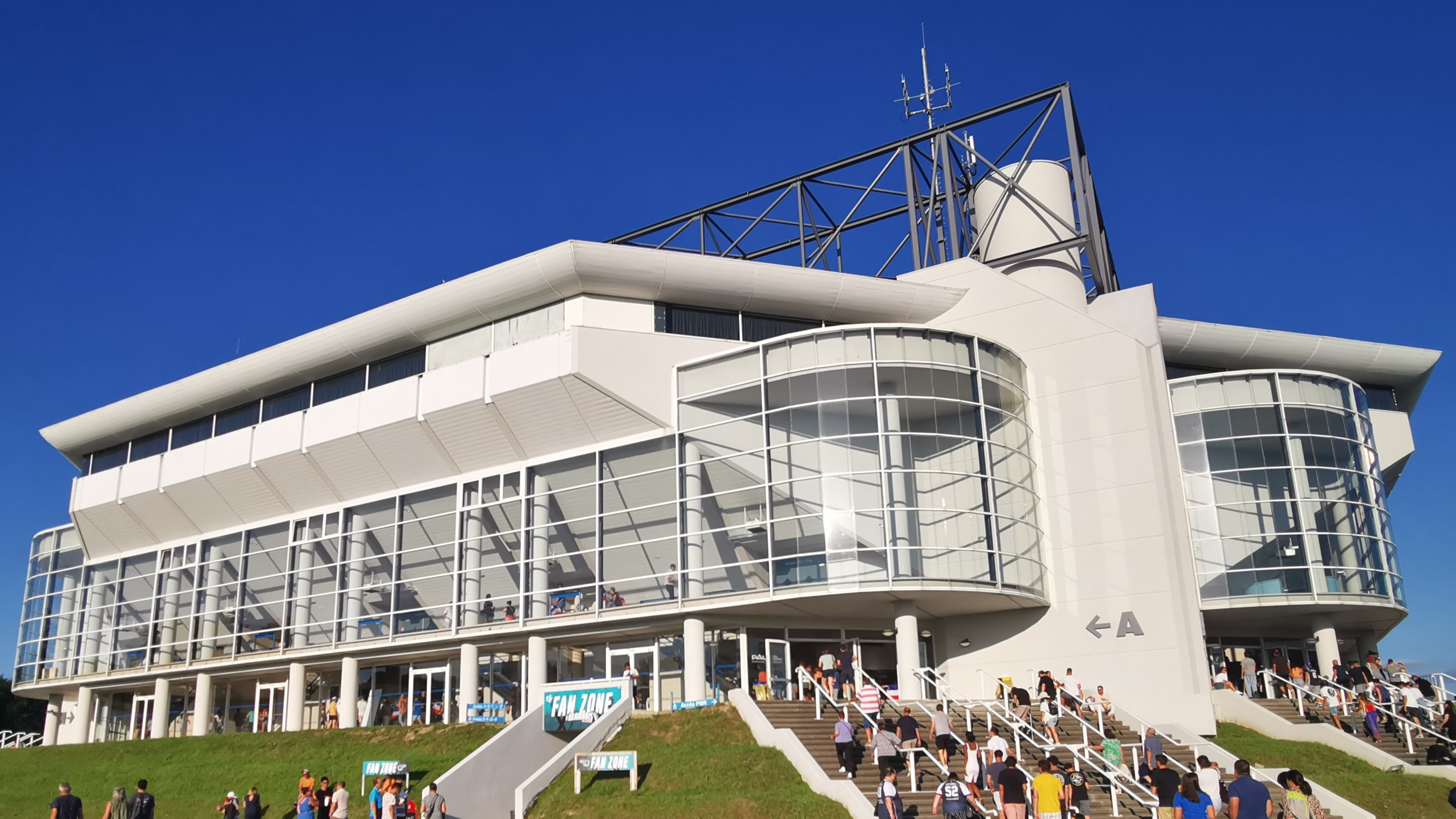
- Interactive map of Palais des Sports de Pau
- Location: Pau, France
- Coordinates: 43°20′4″N 0°21′45″W
- Capacity: 7,707 (basketball)

Construction
- Opened: 1991
- Cost: FRF 78 million (€12 million euros, excluding tax)
- Architects: Jean-Michel Lamaison, Michel Camborde

Tenant
- Élan Béarnais Pau-Orthez (basketball)

The Palais des Sports de Pau is an indoor sporting arena located in the city of Pau, France. Inaugurated in 1991, it has become an iconic venue for sports events, concerts, shows, and conferences in the region. It is the home of Élan Béarnais.

The Palais des sports de Pau stands out with its modern and functional architecture. It offers a seating capacity of 7,707 with a flexible configuration that can adapt to the specific needs of each event. The arena provides excellent visibility for the audience.

Regarding sports events, the Palais des sports de Pau has hosted numerous high-level competitions, particularly in basketball, handball, and volleyball. It has also been chosen as a training venue for professional and national teams in various disciplines. The sports facilities meet professional standards, offering athletes and spectators optimal conditions.

The Palais des sports de Pau also benefits from a strategic location, close to the city center and easily accessible by car via the A64 autoroute or public transportation. It has a spacious parking lot shared with the Zénith de Pau and facilities to accommodate people with reduced mobility.

According to the sports newspaper L'Équipe, the Palais des sports is one of the "mythical stadiums of LNB Pro A".

== History ==
The Palais des sports de Pau was born from the encounter between the city of Pau and Élan Béarnais (previously based in Orthez). To adapt to the demands of professionalism, the union with the neighboring city of Pau became an economic necessity for Orthez (population 10,000). In 1989, Élan Béarnais became Élan Béarnais Pau-Orthez.

Economic considerations were not the only motivation for this partnership. The legendary La Moutète arena in Orthez had become inadequate over the years for a club that aimed to be a leader in French basketball. A gigantic Palais des sports was then constructed in Pau to accommodate this "new" club.

Construction was completed in early 1991, at which point Élan Béarnais Pau-Orthez left the Moutète arena in Orthez and moved to Pau. The Palais was inaugurated in 1991 in the presence of Laurent Fabius, President of the National Assembly, Mayor André Labarrère , Élan's president Pierre Seillant , and many other guests. It was inaugurated during Élan's victory over Limoges CSP with a score of 109–97.

The arena is the result of the work of two architects: Jean-Michel Lamaison and Michel Camborde, and it was baptized "the ideal arena" by Maxi-Basket magazine.

Palais des Sports de Pau has been used as the home arena of the Élan Béarnais Pau-Orthez French professional basketball team, since it opened in 1991. It has also frequently hosted games of the senior men's French national basketball team, since this is the largest basketball-specific arena in France.

In 2020, on the occasion of the thirtieth anniversary of the Palais des sports, Vincent Collet, head coach of the senior men's France national team, stated, "The Palais des sports de Pau is the cathedral of our sport."

As a result, the basketball court at the Palais des sports de Pau now bears the name of Élan's historical president, Pierre Seillant, since April 11, 2022, and a Classic was won against their eternal rival, CSP Limoges.

== Architecture ==
The arena's design is identical to the Zénith de Pau, which is nearby the venue.

The structure is supported by four square towers that also serve as entrances. The towers are connected by four lattice metal beams supporting a central vault that receives direct natural light. The vault's illumination is ensured by four lenses, each 50 meters long and 7.20 meters high. The roof of the Palais rises to a height of 25 meters. The transparent glass facades give the building a sense of lightness while ensuring functional transparency.

"The Palais des sports, my greatest achievement." — Pierre Seillant

=== Technical description ===
- Octagonal shape surrounding four square towers.
- 7,707 seating capacity, including around 500 private boxes.
- Total height: 28 meters.
- Glass surface area: 4,500 square meters.
- Construction involved 370 people working for one year.
- Cost: €12 million excluding tax (approximately 78 million francs).

=== Location and accessibility ===
Located to the north of Pau, just above the Hippodrome du Pont-Long racecourse, and at the exit of the A64 highway, within 5 minutes of the Pau-Pyrénées International Airport, the Palais des Sports, inaugurated in 1991, benefits from an ideal location.

==== Access options ====
The Palais des sports is situated north of Pau, adjacent to the Zénith, the basque pelota (Jai alai) complex, and the Hippodrome du Pont-Long racecourse. It can be reached from Bordeaux via the A65 highway, and then the A64 via the Lescar interchange. A parking area with 1,687 spaces is located near the Palais des sports.

===== Public transportation =====
The Palais des sports is served by Pau's public transportation, operated by the Idelis bus network:

Line T2 Lons Perlic Sud ↔ Pau Stade du Hameau

Line 5 Mazères-Lezons L'Arriou ↔ Pau Zénith

Line 6 Serres-Castet Liben ↔ Bizanos Mairie

Line 16 Montardon École ↔ Pau Pôle Bosquet

Line E Lons Perlic Sud ↔ Pau Pôle Bosquet

Fébus, Pau's hydrogen-powered high-level bus service, stops nearby at the South, near the Pau Hospital.

== Events ==
- EuroBasket 1999
- 2007 World Women's Handball Championship
- 2007 Match des Champions

== Gallery ==
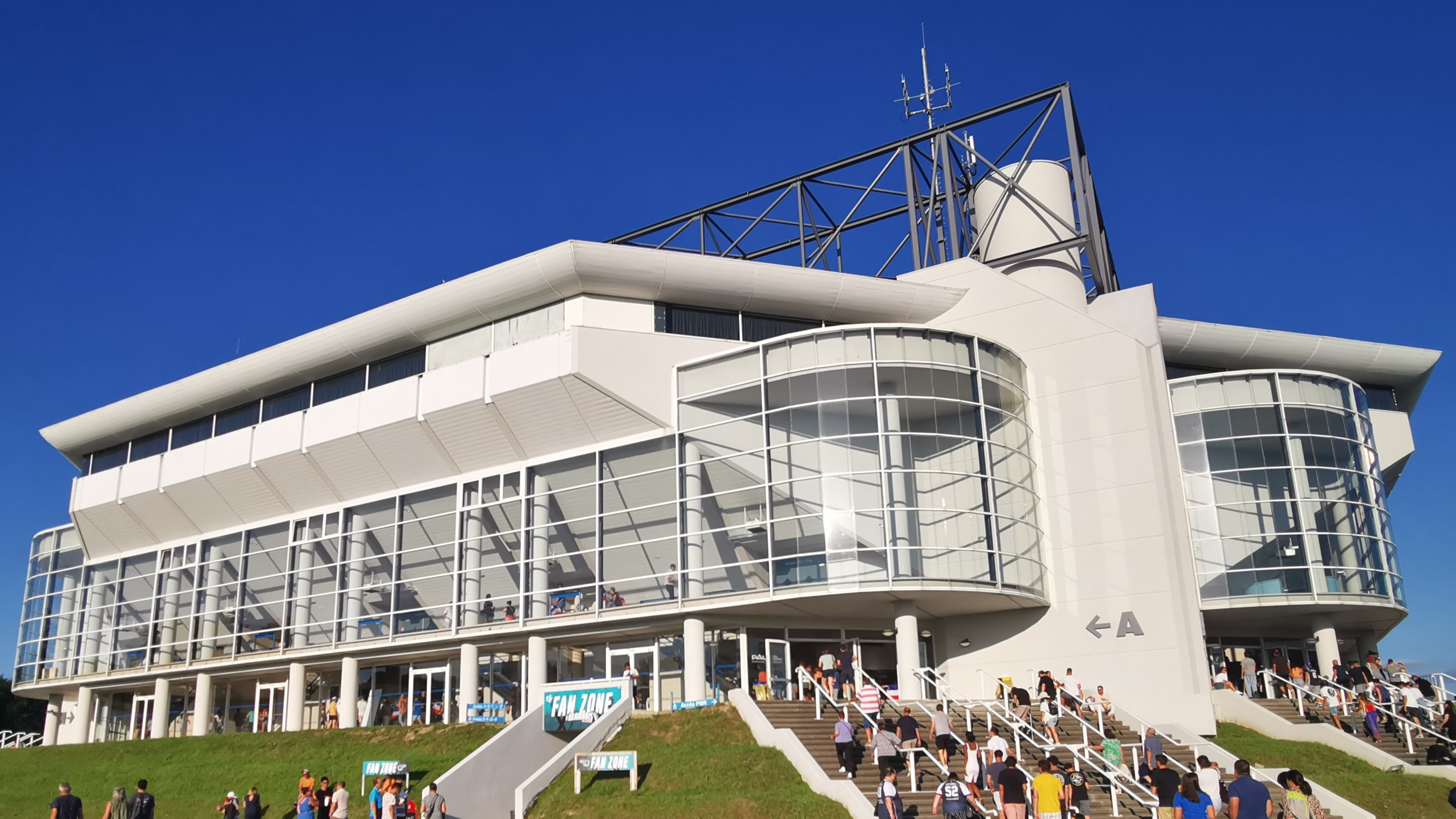
Palais des Sports during France vs Tunisia, on July 31, 2023.

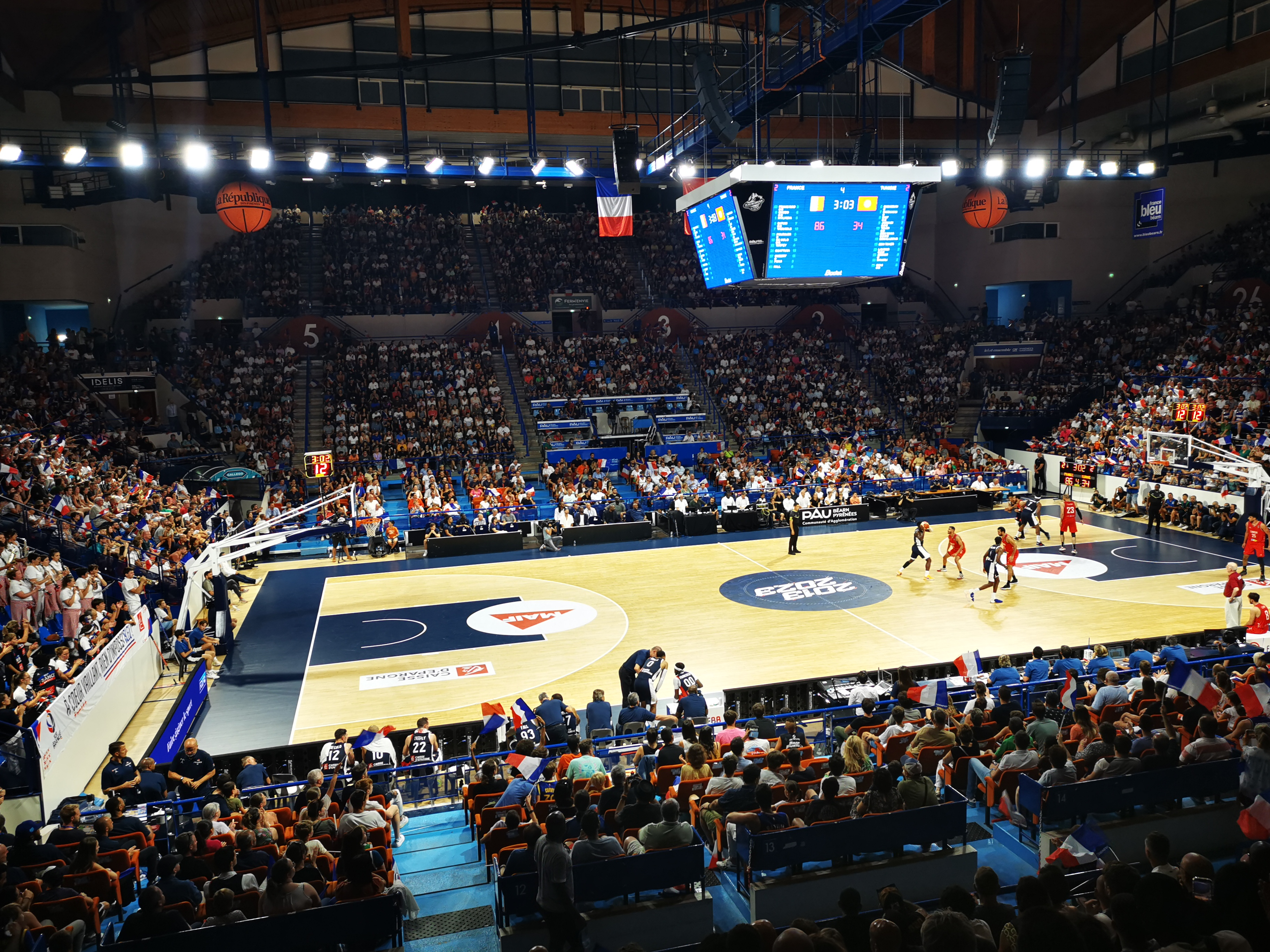
France vs Tunisia, le 31 juillet 2023. Seated in the front row: Boris Diaw, Tony Parker and Florent Pietrus.

== See also ==
- List of indoor arenas in France
