= Palais des sports Marcel-Cerdan =

Sports hall in Levallois, Paris, France

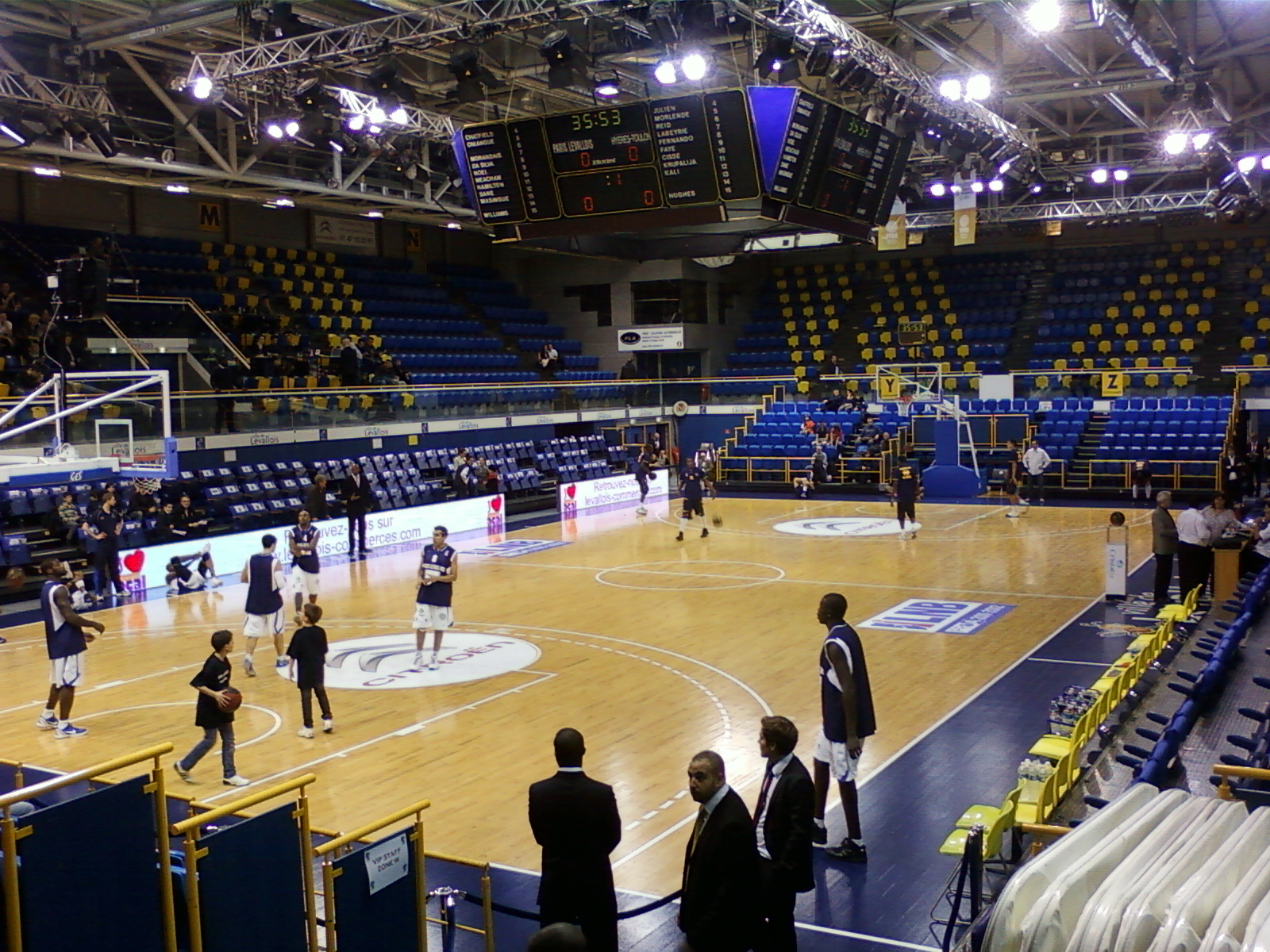
- Interactive map of Palais des sports Marcel-Cerdan
- Full name: Palais des sports Marcel-Cerdan
- Location: Levallois, Paris, France
- Coordinates: 48.8959°N 2.2778°E
- Capacity: 4,000
- Surface: Parquet

Construction
- Groundbreaking: 1991
- Opened: 1992

Tenants
- Paris BR; Levallois Sporting Club; Metropolitans 92

Palais des sports Marcel-Cerdan is a multi-purpose indoor sports arena that is located in Levallois, Paris, France. It is primarily used to host basketball games. The arena is named after the French boxer Marcel Cerdan. The arena has a seating capacity of 4,000.

== History ==
The arena was originally opened in 1992. It has been used as the home arena of the French League basketball clubs Paris BR, Levallois Sporting Club, and Metropolitans 92.
