= List of basketball clubs in France =

This is a list of basketball clubs playing in the French league system. It includes one club in Monaco, AS Monaco.

Contents : A B C D G H L N O P Q R S T V By League

== A ==
Club	Full name	Town (department)	2021–22
AMSB	Aix Maurienne Savoie Basket	Aix-les-Bains (Savoie)	Pro B
Antibes Sharks	Olympique d'Antibes Juan-les-Pins	Antibes (Alpes-Maritimes)	Pro B

== B ==
Club	Full name	Town (department)	2021–22
Berck Basket Club	Avenir Basket Berck Rang du Fliers	Berck (Pas-de-Calais)	Nationale 2 (4th division)
Besançon BCD	Besançon Basket Comté Doubs	Besançon (Doubs)	Defunct
ADA Blois Basket 41	L'Abeille des Aydes Blois Basket 41	Blois (Loir-et-Cher)	Pro B
JSA Bordeaux Basket	Jeunes de Saint-Augustin Bordeaux Métropole	Bordeaux (Gironde)	Nationale 1 (3rd division)
Boulazac Basket Dordogne	Boulazac Basket Dordogne	Boulazac (Dordogne)	Pro B
SOMB Boulogne-sur-Mer	Stade Olympique Maritime Boulonnais	Boulogne-sur-Mer (Pas-de-Calais)	Nationale 1 (3rd division)
JL Bourg Basket	Jeunesse Laïque de Bourg-en-Bresse	Bourg-en-Bresse (Ain)	Pro A
Tango Bourges Basket	Tango Bourges Basket	Bourges (Cher)	LFB (women)
Étendard de Brest	Étendard de Brest	Brest (Finistère)	Defunct

== C ==
Club	Full name	Town (department)	2019–20
Caen Basket Calvados	Caen Basket Calvados	Caen (Calvados)	Nationale 1 (3rd division)
Centre Fédéral de Basket-ball	Centre Fédéral de Basket-ball	Paris (12th arrondissement)	Nationale 1 (3rd division)
Élan Chalon	Élan Sportif Chalonnais	Chalon-sur-Saône (Saône-et-Loire)	Pro A
Champagne Basket	Champagne Basket	Châlons-en-Champagne - Reims (Marne)	Pro A
Étoile Charleville-Mézières	Étoile de Charleville-Mézières	Charleville-Mézières (Ardennes)	Nationale 2 (4th division)
C' Chartres Basket	C' Chartres Basket Masculin	Chartres (Eure-et-Loir)	Nationale 1 (3rd division)
Cholet Basket	Cholet Basket	Cholet (Maine-et-Loire)	Pro A
Stade Clermontois BA	Stade Clermontois Basket Auvergne	Clermont-Ferrand (Puy-de-Dôme)	Defunct (Note: Stade Clermontois and JA Vichy merged in 2015, creating the current JA Vichy-Clermont Basket.)
Cognac Charente Basket-ball	Cognac Charente Basket-ball	Cognac (Charente)	Nationale 2 (4th division)

== D ==
Club	Full name	Town (department)	2021–22
ASC Denain-Voltaire PH	Association Sportive Cail Denain Voltaire Porte du Hainaut	Denain (Nord)	Pro B
JDA Dijon Basket	JDA Dijon Basket	Dijon (Côte-d'Or)	Pro A

== E ==
Club	Full name	Town (department)	2021–22
GET Vosges	Golbey Épinal Thaon Vosges	Épinal (Vosges)	Nationale 1 (3rd division)

== F ==
Club	Full name	Town (department)	2021–22
Fos Provence Basket	Provence Basket	Fos-sur-Mer (Bouches-du-Rhône)	Pro A

== G ==
Club	Full name	Town (department)	2021–22
BCM Gravelines-Dunkerque	Basket Club Maritime Gravelines-Dunkerque	Gravelines (Nord)	Pro A
Alliance Sport Alsace	Alliance Sport Alsace	Gries & Souffelweyersheim (Bas-Rhin)	Pro B
BC Gries Oberhoffen	Basket Club Gries Oberhoffen	Gries (Bas-Rhin)	Defunct (Note: Alliance Sport Alsace was formed after the 2020–21 season by the merger of five clubs—BC Gries-Oberhoffen, BC Nord Alsace, BC Souffelweyersheim, Walbourg-Eschbach Basket, and Weyersheim BB.)

== H ==
Club	Full name	Town (department)	2021–22
HTV Basket	Hyères Toulon Var Basket	Hyères (Var)	Nationale 2 (4th division)

== L ==
Club	Full name	Town (department)	2021–22
Basket Lattes Montpellier Agglomération	Basket Lattes Montpellier Agglomération	Lattes (Hérault)	LFB (women)
STB Le Havre	Saint Thomas Basket Le Havre	Le Havre (Seine-Maritime)	Nationale 1 (3rd division)
Le Mans Sarthe Basket	Le Mans Sarthe Basket	Le Mans (Sarthe)	Pro A
ESSM Le Portel	Étoile Sportive Saint-Michel Le Portel Côte d'Opale	Le Portel (Pas-de-Calais)	Pro A
Olympique Lille Basket	Olympique Lillois	Lille (Nord)	Defunct
Lille Métropole BC	Lille Métropole Basket Club	Lille (Nord)	Pro B
Limoges CSP	Limoges Cercle Saint-Pierre	Limoges (Haute-Vienne)	Pro A
CEP Lorient	CEP Lorient Breizh Basket	Lorient (Morbihan)	Nationale 1 (3rd division)
Basket CRO Lyon	Basket Croix Rousse Olympique Lyon	Lyon (Métropole de Lyon)	Nationale 3 (fifth level; amateur)

== M ==
Club	Full name	Town (department)	2019–20
AS Monaco Basket	Association Sportive de Monaco	Fontvieille, Monaco	Pro A
Metropolitans 92 (Note: Most recently renamed from Levallois Metropolitans effective with the 2019–20 season.)	Metropolitans 92	Levallois-Perret (Hauts-de-Seine)	Pro A
USO Mondeville	Union Sportive Ouvrière de Mondeville	Mondeville (Calvados)	LFB (women)
CA Mulhouse	Cercle Athlétique Mulhousien	Mulhouse (Haut-Rhin)	Defunct
FC Mulhouse Basket	Football Club Mulhouse Basket	Mulhouse (Haut-Rhin)	Nationale 1 (3rd division)

== N ==
Club	Full name	Town (department)	2019–20
SLUC Nancy Basket	Stade Lorrain Université Club Nancy	Nancy (Meurthe-et-Moselle)	Pro B
Nanterre 92	Nanterre 92	Nanterre (Hauts-de-Seine)	Pro A
ABC Nantes	Amicale Basket Club de Nantes	Nantes (Loire-Atlantique)	Defunct
Hermine Nantes Basket	Nantes Basket Hermine	Nantes (Loire-Atlantique)	Pro B
Cavigal Nice Basket	Cavigal Nice Basket 06	Nice (Alpes-Maritimes)	LFB (women)

== O ==
Club	Full name	Town (department)	2021–22
Orléans Loiret Basket	Orléans Loiret Basket	Orléans (Loiret)	Pro A

== P ==
Club	Full name	Town (department)	2021–22
Paris Basketball	Paris Basketball	Paris (13th arrondissement)	Pro A
ÉB Pau-Lacq-Orthez	Élan Béarnais Pau-Lacq-Orthez	Pau (Pyrénées-Atlantiques)	Pro A
Poitiers Basket 86	Poitiers Basket 86	Poitiers (Poitou-Charentes)	Nationale 1 (3rd division)

== Q ==
Club	Full name	Town (department)	2021–22
Béliers de Kemper	Béliers de Kemper – UJAP 1984	Quimper (Finistère)	Pro B

== R ==
Club	Full name	Town (department)	2021–22
CAUFA Reims	Centre Athlétique de l'Union Franco-Américaine de Reims	Reims (Marne)	Defunct
Chorale Roanne Basket	Chorale Roanne Basket	Roanne (Loire)	Pro A
Rouen Métropole Basket	Rouen Métropole Basket	Rouen (Seine-Maritime)	Pro B

== S ==
Club	Full name	Town (department)	2021–22
Saint-Amand Hainaut Basket	Saint-Amand Hainaut Basket	Saint-Amand-les-Eaux (Nord)	LFB (women)
Union Saint-Amand	Union Saint-Amand Porte du Hainaut	Saint-Amand-les-Eaux (Nord)	Defunct (Note: Union Saint-Amand and US Valenciennes merged in 2008 to form the current Saint-Amand Hainaut Basket.)
Saint-Chamond Basket	Saint-Chamond Basket	Saint-Chamond (Loire)	Pro B
SIG Strasbourg	SIG Strasbourg	Strasbourg (Bas-Rhin)	Pro A
BC Souffelweyersheim	Basket Club Souffelweyersheim	Souffelweyersheim (Bas-Rhin)	Defunct

== T ==
Club	Full name	Town (department)	2021–22
Tarbes Gespe Bigorre	Tarbes Gespe Bigorre	Tarbes (Hautes-Pyrénées)	LFB (women)
Tours Métropole Basket	Tours Métropole Basket	Tours (Indre-et-Loire)	Pro B

== V ==
Club	Full name	Town (department)	2019–20
US Valenciennes Olympic	Union Sportive Valenciennes Olympic	Valenciennes (Nord)	Defunct
JA Vichy	Jeanne d’Arc de Vichy Val d’Allier Auvergne Basket	Vichy (Allier)	Defunct
JA Vichy-Clermont Métropole	Jeanne d'Arc Vichy-Clermont Métropole	Clermont-Ferrand (Puy-de-Dôme)	Pro B
ASVEL Basket	Association Sportive de Villeurbanne et Éveil Lyonnais	Villeurbanne (Métropole de Lyon)	Pro A
ASVEL Féminin	Association Sportive de Villeurbanne et Éveil Lyonnais	Villeurbanne (Métropole de Lyon)	LFB (women)
ESB Villeneuve-d'Ascq	Entente Sportive Basket de Villeneuve-d'Ascq - Lille Métropole	Villeneuve-d'Ascq (Nord)	LFB (women)

== By League ==
Here's a list of all the clubs playing in the French basketball league system in the following levels:

- Pro A clubs

Some other clubs are listed:

- Pro B clubs
- Women clubs
- Lower leagues clubs

=== Pro A ===
18 clubs (2021–22 season)

- ASVEL
- Boulogne-Levallois
- Bourg-en-Bresse
- Châlons-Reims
- Cholet
- Dijon
- Fos-sur-Mer
- Gravelines-Dunkerque
- Le Mans
- Le Portel
- Limoges
- Monaco
- Nanterre
- Orléans Loiret
- Paris
- Pau-Lacq-Orthez
- Roanne
- Strasbourg

=== Pro B ===
18 clubs (2021–22 season)

- Aix-Maurienne
- Alliance Alsace
- Antibes Sharks
- Blois
- Boulazac
- Chalon-sur-Saône
- Denain
- Évreux
- Lille
- Nancy
- Nantes
- Quimper
- Rouen
- Saint-Chamond
- Saint-Quentin
- Saint-Vallier
- Tours
- Vichy-Clermont

=== Lower men's divisions ===
- Berck
- JSA Bordeaux Basket
- Boulogne
- Caen
- CFBB
- Charleville-Mézières
- Chartres
- Cognac
- CRO Lyon
- Épinal
- Hyères-Toulon
- Le Havre
- Lorient
- Mulhouse

=== Women ===
- ASVEL
- Bourges
- Lattes
- Mondeville
- Nice
- Saint-Amand
- Tarbes
- Villeneuve-d'Ascq
