= ESSMG Lyon =

- Founded: 1946
- History: 1946–48
- Location: Lyon, France
- Team colors: Black, White, Black
- Championships: 1 French League
Home	Away

Éveil sportif Sainte-Marie de la Guillotière de Lyon or Éveil Lyon was a French basketball club that was based in Lyon. The club's name was commonly abbreviated to ESSMG Lyon. The club is now dissolved.

== History ==
The club, affiliated to the parish patronage of France's Gymnastics and Sports Sponsorships Federation, and then to the Sports Federation of France, is best known for its good performance in the top-tier level basketball championship of France, in the decade of 1940s. The club included several renowned players, including Robert Busnel and André Buffière.

The club was formed in 1946, following the demise of FC Grenoble (French champion in 1943 and 1944), and the move of most of its staff to ESSMG Lyon. Robert Busnel led the club to win the championship title in France, against Championnet, which was led by Henri Lesmayoux; in the French championship finals, on May 25, 1946, at the Palais des sports. Éveil sportif also played in the league's finals in 1947, where they lost to Paris Université (PUC). The departure of Robert Busnel for Marseille the next season, marked the end of the ambitions of the club, which then merged with Association sportive de Villeurbanne in 1948, to found ASVEL.

== Honours ==
French League

- Winners (1): 1945–46

== Notable players ==
- (France) Robert Busnel
- (France) André Buffière
