= Sébastien Jasaron =

French basketball player (born 1978)

Sébastien Jasaron (born 25 July 1978 in Paris) is a French basketball player who played 6 games for French Pro A league club Brest during the 2005-2006 season.
