= Frédéric Bourdillon =

French-Israeli basketball player (born 1991)

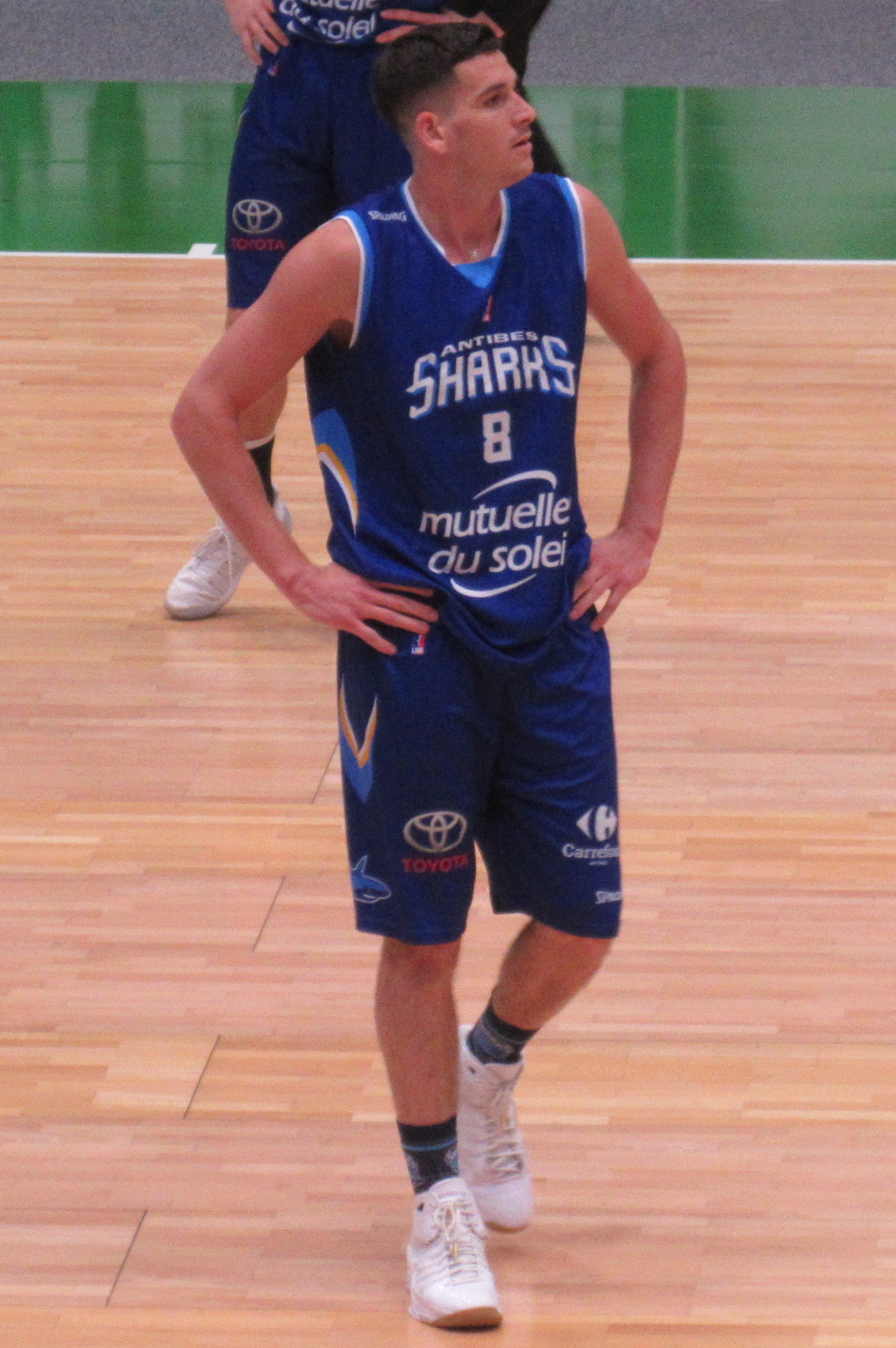
- Bourdillon with Antibes in 2017

No. 18 – Hapoel Tel Aviv
- Position: Shooting guard
- League: Israeli Basketball Premier League; EuroLeague

Personal information
- Born: March 16, 1991 (age 35) Grasse, France
- Listed height: 1.93 m (6 ft 4 in)
- Listed weight: 86 kg (190 lb)

Career information
- High school: INSEP (Paris, France)
- NBA draft: 2013: undrafted
- Playing career: 2009–present

Career history
- 2009–2010: Antibes
- 2010–2011: Élan Chalon
- 2011–2013: Étoile Charleville-Mézières
- 2013–2014: Rueil
- 2014–2017: Antibes
- 2017–2018: Maccabi Haifa
- 2018–2019: Hapoel Eilat
- 2019–2020: Maccabi Rishon LeZion
- 2020: Maccabi Tel Aviv
- 2020–2023: Hapoel Holon
- 2023–2026: Bnei Herzliya
- 2026–present: Hapoel Tel Aviv

Career highlights
- 2× Israeli Basketball Premier League champion (2020, 2022); Balkan League champion (2021); LNB Pro B champion (2015); French Cup winner (2011)
Medals
Men's basketball
Representing France
FIBA Europe Under-18 Championship
Silver medal – second place	2009 France	U-18 Team

Frédéric Bourdillon (Hebrew: פרדריק בורדיון; born March 16, 1991) is a French-Israeli professional basketball player for Hapoel Tel Aviv of the Israeli Basketball Premier League and the EuroLeague.

Bourdillon was a member of the French Under-16 and Under-18 national teams. He is a two-time Israeli champion, and a one-time winner of both the French Cup and the Balkan League. Standing at 6 ft 4 in (1.93 m), he plays at the shooting guard position.

== Early life ==
Bourdillon is Jewish, and was born in Grasse, a town in southern France near Antibes.

Bourdillon grew up playing with INSEP, a French training institute for excellence in sports. The school had been previously attended by several promising NBA players such as Tony Parker, Boris Diaw, and Ronny Turiaf. During his time with INSEP, he participated in Nike International Junior Tournaments in 2010.

== Professional career ==
=== France (2009–2017) ===
==== Olympique Antibes ====
In 2009, Bourdillon started his professional career in Olympique Antibes.

==== Élan Chalon ====
In 2010, at 19 years of age Bourdillon signed with Élan Chalon for the 2010–11 season. Bourdillon won the 2011 French Cup title with Chalon. He played one game with the team.

==== Étoile Charleville-Mézières ====
In 2012-13, he played for Étoile Charleville-Mézières of the French LNB Pro B. In 34 games Bourdillon averaged 15.2 minutes, 4.6 points, 1.2 rebounds, and 1.4 assists per game.

==== Rueil Athletic Club ====
In 2013–14, Bourdillon played for Rueil Athletic Club in the French NM1. In 34 games he averaged 26.4 minutes, 10.7 points, 2.6 rebounds, 3.8 assists, and 1.8 steals per game, while shooting 82.4% from the free throw line.

==== Return to Antibes ====
On August 4, 2014, Bourdillon returned to Antibes, signing a one-year deal. In 2014-15 in 41 games he averaged 15.3 minutes, 5.3 points,1.8 rebounds, and 2.2 assists per game, while shooting 41.2% from three-point range.

On July 14, 2015, Bourdillon signed a two-year contract extension with Antibes. In 2015-16 with Antibes, in 34 games he averaged 13.1 minutes, 3.3 points,1.1 rebounds, and 1.1 assists per game.

In 2016-17 with Antibes, in 34 games Bourdillon averaged 17.1 minutes, 3.8 points, 1.6 rebounds, and 1.9 assists per game.

=== Israel (2017–present) ===
==== Maccabi Haifa ====
On September 4, 2017, Bourdillon signed with the Israeli team Maccabi Haifa for the 2017–18 season. On February 4, 2018, Bourdillon was released by Haifa after appearing in 14 games, in which he averaged 13.0 minutes, 2.7 points, 1.2 rebounds, and 1.5 assists per game.

==== Hapoel Eilat ====
On February 12, 2018, Bourdillon signed with Hapoel Eilat for the rest of the season. That season, Bourdillon helped Eilat reach the 2018 Israeli League Playoffs, where they eventually lost to Hapoel Holon in the quarterfinals. Playing in 22 games, he averaged 17.8 minutes, 4.2 points, 1.4 rebounds, 1.3 assists, and 1.0 steals per game.

On June 28, 2018, Bourdillon signed a one-year contract extension with Eilat. On April 29, 2019, Bourdillon recorded a career-high 21 points, shooting 4-of-9 from three-point range, along with three rebounds and three steals in an 89–77 win over Ironi Nes Ziona. Bourdillon helped Eilat reach the 2019 Israeli Basketball Premier League Final Four, where they eventually lost to Maccabi Tel Aviv in the semifinals. In 2018-19, in 37 games he averaged 23.4 minutes, 8.1 points, 2.1 rebounds, 1.4 assists, and 1.1 steals per game.

==== Maccabi Rishon LeZion ====
On October 18, 2019, Bourdillon joined Maccabi Rishon LeZion, signing a two-month deal with an option to extend it for the rest of the season. In 2019-20, he played 18 games with the team. In his games in the Eurocup, he averaged 28.5 minutes, 12.3 points, 2.3 rebounds, 1.5 assists, and 1.7 steals per game.

==== Maccabi Tel Aviv ====
On July 21, 2020, Bourdillon signed with Maccabi Tel Aviv. He played three games for the team.

==== Hapoel Holon ====
On October 29, 2020, he signed with Hapoel Holon. In 2020-21 with the team, in 54 games Bourdillon averaged 22.8 minutes, 6.6 points, 2.7 rebounds, 2.1 assists, and 1.2 steals per game.

In 2021-22 with Hapoel Holon, in 47 games Bourdillon averaged18.9 minutes,4.9 points, 1.9 rebounds, and 1.3 assists per game, while shooting 89.6% from the free throw line.

In 2022-23 with Hapoel Holon, in 30 games he averaged17.1 minutes,4.6 points, 2.6 rebounds, and 1.1 assists per game, while shooting 87.5% from the free throw line.

==== Bnei Herzliya ====
On November 8, 2023, Bourdillon signed a 2-month contract with Bnei Herzliya of the Israeli Basketball Premier League. In 2023-24, in 29 games with the team, he averaged 27.4 minutes, 9.6 points, 3.7 rebounds, 2.2 assists, and 0.9 steals per game, while shooting 40.1% from three-point range.

In 2024-25 with Bnei Herzliya, in 35 games Bourdillon averaged19.5 minutes, 5.4 points, 1.8 rebounds, 1.6 assists, and 0.9 steals per game.

In 2025-26 with Bnei Herzliya, in 13 games he averaged 21.8 minutes, 5.2 points, 3.2 rebounds, and 1.5 assists per game, while shooting 87.5% from the free throw line.

==== Ironi Ramat Gan ====
Bourdillon also played in 2025-26 for Ironi Ramat Gan. In four games with the team, he averaged 16.5 minutes, 6.8 points, and 1.5 rebounds per game.

==== Hapoel Tel Aviv ====
On August 6, 2026, Bourdillon signed a one-year deal with Hapoel Tel Aviv of the Israeli Basketball Premier League and the EuroLeague.

== International career ==
Bourdillon was a member of the French Under-16 and Under-18 national teams, and played for them in the Euro Championships in 2007 and 2009, where he helped the team win a silver medal. He also competed for France at the 2015 Summer Universiade.
