= ES Avignon Basket =

Entente Sportive Avignon Basket
- Location: Avignon, France
- Team colors: Blue & white
Home	Away

Entente Sportive Avignon Basket is a French former basketball club that was based in Avignon. Thereafter, it became the Athletic Union Avignon-Le Pontet Basket, which is the leading club in the city, and becoming in 2014, Grand Avignon Sorgues Basket.

== History ==
At the end of the 1976-77 season, ES Avignon rose to the French Division 1, under the leadership of its captain, Antoine Cerase, the American Mike Hopwood, and the great French hope of the time, Philippe Szanyiel. The club competed for 12 seasons in the elite level championship of France, and had a record of 110 wins, 7 draws, and 199 losses in 316 games.

== Notable players ==
Note: Flags indicate national team eligibility at FIBA-sanctioned events. Players may hold other non-FIBA nationalities not displayed.

Criteria

To appear in this section a player must have either:

- Set a club record or won an individual award while at the club
- Played at least one official international match for their national team at any time
- Played at least one official NBA match at any time.

- (France) Didier Dobbels
- (France) Alain Larrouquis
- (France) Philip Szanyiel
- (France) Franck Cazalon
- (France) Antoine Cerase
- (United States) Vince Taylor
- (United States) Horace Wyatt
- (United States) Tom Snyder
- (United States) Pat Burtey
- (France) Bernard Van den Broeck
- (United States) Emmanuel Schmitt
