= FC Mulhouse Basket =

- Leagues: LNB Pro B
- Founded: 1949
- History: 1949–1992 Mulhouse BC; 1992–present FC Mulhouse
- Arena: Salle Marcel Tschanz / Palais des Sports (3,700 seats)
- Location: Mulhouse, Alsace, France
- Team colors: White, Blue
- Website: http://www.fcm-basket.fr/
Home	Away

FC Mulhouse Basket or simply Mulhouse is a French basketball club playing in National 2 (basketball) (fourth division championship of France) during the 2011–2012 season. The club is based in the commune of Mulhouse, in eastern France, close to the Swiss and German borders.

The women's section also became known in the elite of basketball in the early 1990s.

== History ==
Foyer alsacien Mulhouse won the national title in 1924, 1925 and 1926, losing the following year but recovered in 1928 to never let go before 1932! In 1935 and in 1937 and 1938, it is the other club of Mulhouse, Mulhousien, who won the title. Basketball is played at the time with 8 players on the field and a great rivalry is born between these two leading Mulhouse clubs.

The club was born in 1949 from the merger of the prestigious Foyer alsacien Mulhouse and the "Espérance de Mulhouse". The new entity will be denominated "Mulhouse Basketball Club" (MBC). In 1970, became a new merger with "GENS Mulhouse" which relegated from National 2 to National 4. Then accesses Club in National 3 at the end of his first season, then National 2 (1974) with the title of champion of France National 3. When Carmine Calzonetti arrived as coach in 1976, the club rises to Nationale 1 (1st division) in 1978. During the 1980s, Jean-Luc Monschau became president of the club. Gradually the club, accustomed to the depths of the championship, up the slope and anchors the play-off. In 1989 Mulhouse led by Philip Szanyiel and Jean-Aimé Toupane (both they came from Monaco), won the Tournoi des As against Pitch Cholet and acquired its shareholding in the European Cup Winners' Cup of the next year. Alsο, MBC participated for two consecutive years in the FIBA Korać Cup and reached the semifinals in 1991, where they eliminated by the Italian declining powerhouse Clear Cantù. This year (1991) saw in Mulhouse the arrival of Joe "JellyeBean" Bryant, father of the NBA star Kobe Bryant aged 13 to time.

At the end of the next season, the club is demoted to National A2 for financial reasons. MBC disappears from the A1 and renamed to FCM Basket (FC Mulhouse Basket). FCM was administratively relegated (due to deficit in 1994) before climbing again all levels of the championship. In three years, the club goes back to three divisions for a return to Pro B in 1997. FCM Basketball connects the good and less good result and fails to climb in Pro A.

In 2006–2007, the club, too inconsistent and lack of wins is relegated to National 1.

In November 2007, the club drops the Balance Sheet1. Late 2008, the club was relegated in sporting Nationale 2. But without the necessary financial support, the club obliged to declare bankruptcy. So it restarts in pre-national for 2008/2009 season, a very difficult season, where the club is saved in the last game.

For 2009/2010, the club gives new ambitions under the leadership of a new staff. The revival is running under the name of Mulhouse Basket, with the accession in National 3.

2009/2010, Mulhouse Basket project is abandoned, but the adventure continues in National 3 under the name and colors of FCM Basket. 2010/2011, the senior team finished undefeated in the league and rises in National 2.

== Honours and titles ==
Total titles: 2

=== Domestic ===
French Cup

- Runners-up (1): 1952–53

Tournament of Aces

- Winners (1): 1989

French League 2

- Winners (1): 1977–78

=== European ===
FIBA Saporta Cup

- Quarterfinalist (1): 1989–90

FIBA Korać Cup:

- Semifinalist (1): 1990–91

== Notable players ==
Note: Flags indicate national team eligibility at FIBA-sanctioned events. Players may hold other non-FIBA nationalities not displayed.

Criteria

To appear in this section a player must have either:

- Set a club record or won an individual award while at the club
- Played at least one official international match for their national team at any time
- Played at least one official NBA match at any time.

- (France) Philip Szanyiel
- (United States) Joe Bryant
- (United States) - (Israel) Joe Dawson

== Head coaches ==
- 1972–1975 : (France) Marcel Rinner
- 1975–1978 : (United States) Carmine Calzonetti
- 1978–1979 : (Socialist Federal Republic of Yugoslavia) Serge Kalember
- 1979–1980 : (United States) Rudy D'Amico
- 1980–1981 : (France) Jean Racz
- 1981–1983 : (France) Jean Galle
- 1983–1985 : (France) Barry White
- 1985–1985 : (Socialist Federal Republic of Yugoslavia) Serge Kalember
- 1985–1991: (France) Jean-Luc Monschau
- 1991–1992: (United States) Chris Singleton
- 1992–1993: (France) Patrick Schlegel
- 1993–1994: (France) Francis Jordane
- 1994–1998: (France) Patrick Schlegel
- 1998–2002: (France) Jamel Benabid
- 2002–2002: (France) Philip Szanyiel
- 2002–2004: (France) Jacques Vernerey
- 2004–2006: (France) Charlie Auffray
- 2006–2007: (France) Éric Bartecheky
- 2007–2008: (France) Mike Gonsalves
- 2009–2013: (France) Jamel Benabid
