= Loïc Akono =

Congolese basketball player (born 1987)

No. 6 – SOMB
- Position: Point guard
- League: LNB Pro B

Personal information
- Born: 6 January 1987 (age 39) Marcq-en-Barœul, France
- Listed height: 5 ft 9.3 in (1.76 m)
- Listed weight: 165 lb (75 kg)

Career information
- Playing career: 2004–present

Career history
- 2004–2006: BCM Gravelines
- 2006–2008: Étendard de Brest
- 2008–2009: BCM Gravelines
- 2009–2012: JSF Nanterre
- 2012–2013: Lille
- 2013–2015: SOMB
- 2015–2017: Fos Provence
- 2017–2018: Orléans Loiret
- 2018–present: SOMB

Loïc Akono (born 6 January 1987) is a Congolese professional basketball player who currently plays for SOM Boulonnais of the LNB Pro B.

Akono has been a member of the Congo national basketball team. He has been working with Jeep Elite and Pro B for 14 seasons.
