= Xavier Corosine =

French basketball player

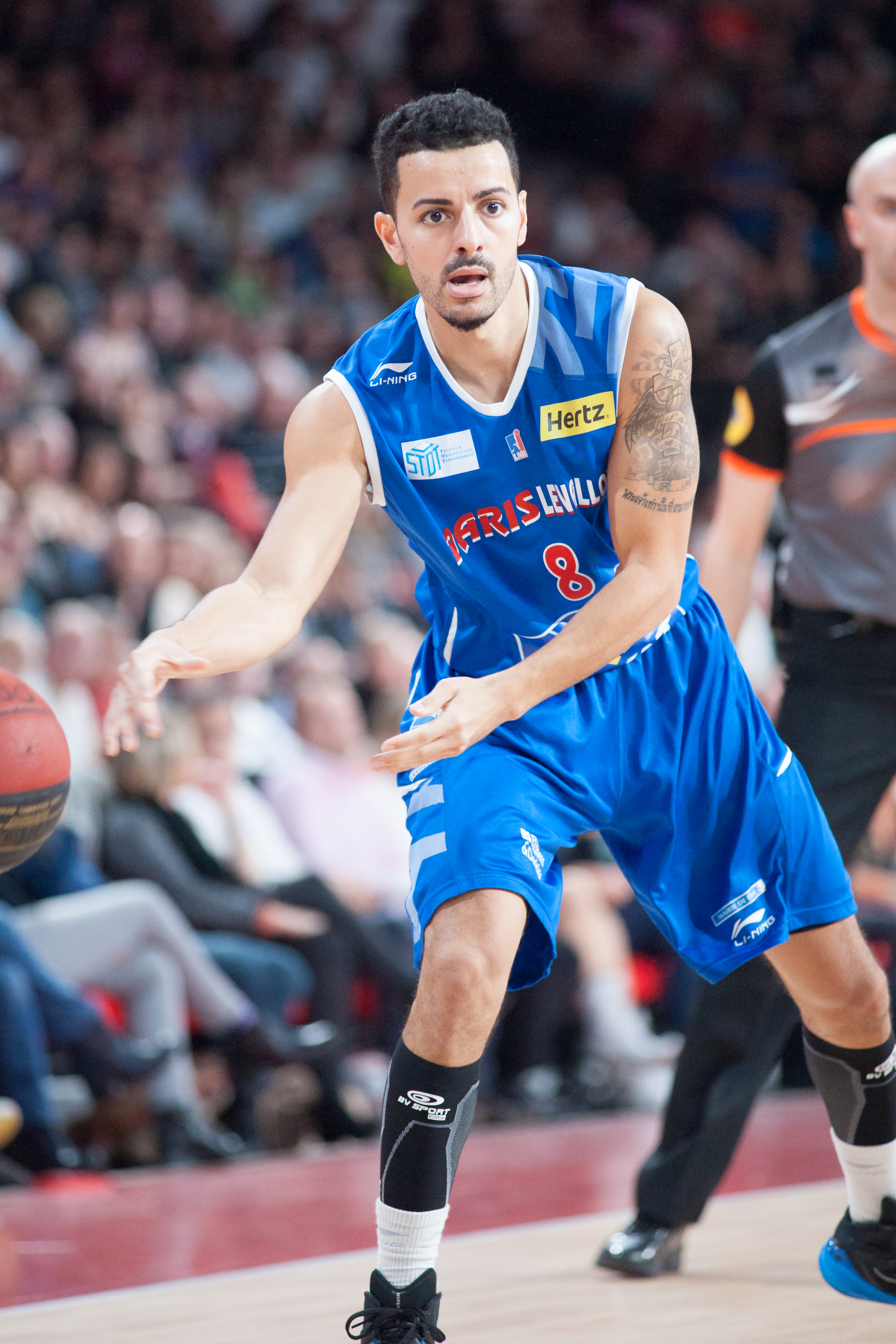
- Corosine with Paris-Levallois in 2014

Free agent
- Position: Point guard / shooting guard

Personal information
- Born: 12 March 1985 (age 41) Fréjus, France
- Listed height: 1.85 m (6 ft 1 in)
- Listed weight: 71 kg (157 lb)

Career information
- Playing career: 2003–present
- Number: 8

Career history
- 2003–2006: Paris Racing
- 2006–2008: Élan Chalon
- 2008–2009: Étoile de Charleville-Mézières
- 2009–2014: JSF Nanterre
- 2014–2015: Paris-Levallois
- 2015–2017: SOMB

Career highlights
- 3x Pro A three-point shootout champion (2011–2013)

Xavier Corosine (born 12 March 1985) is a French basketball player who plays for the French Pro A league club SOMB Boulogne-sur-Mer. Having a height of 1.85 m (6 ft 1 in), Corosine usually plays as point guard or shooting guard.
