= Ferdinand Prénom =

French basketball player

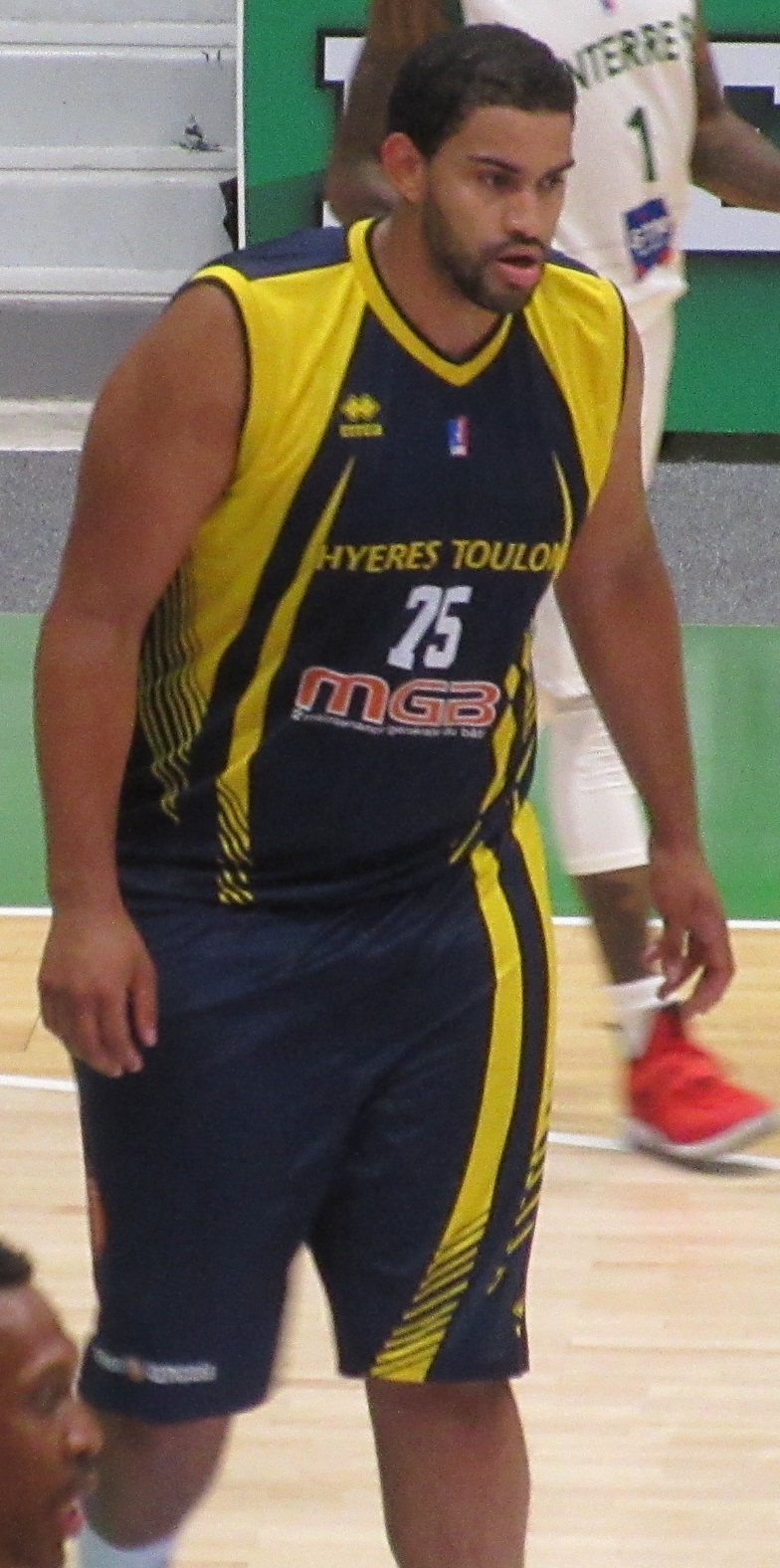

Free Agent
- Position: Center

Personal information
- Born: 11 January 1991 (age 35) Paris, France
- Listed height: 203 cm (6 ft 8 in)
- Listed weight: 140 kg (309 lb)

Career information
- Playing career: 2008–present

Career history
- 2008–2011: JDA Dijon
- 2011–2012: Antibes Sharks
- 2012–2015: JDA Dijon
- 2015–2016: Boulogne
- 2016–2018: Hyères-Toulon
- 2018: Orléans
- 2018–2020: Chorale Roanne Basket

Ferdinand Prénom (born 11 January 1991) is a French professional basketball player, who last played for Chorale Roanne Basket of LNB Pro A.

== Playing career ==
On 6 May 2014 he was part of the list of sixteen pre-selected players for the France A 'team to tour China and Italy during the month of June.

In May 2015, he signed a one-year contract with Boulogne, a French club relegated to Pro B. In February 2020, he suffered a season ending knee injury.
