= Corosine =

Corosine is a French surname. Notable people with the surname include:

- Pierre-François Corosine (fl. 2000s), Paralympic athlete
- Xavier Corosine (born 1985), French basketball player
