= 2026–27 LNB Élite season =

French professional basketball season

2026–27 LNB Élite season^{1}
- Season: 2026–27
- Dates: 25 September 2026 – 9 May 2027 (regular season)
- Teams: 16
- ^{1} Sponsored league name, referring to Betclic.

The 2026–27 LNB Élite season, also known as Betclic Élite for sponsorship reasons, is the 105th season of the LNB Élite, France's top basketball league. It will begin on 25 September 2026 with the regular season and conclude in June 2027 with the playoffs.

AS Monaco, the defending champions, were excluded from the competition due to financial trouble.

== Teams ==
A total of 16 teams participate in the league, including 14 teams from the 2025–26 season and two promoted from the Élite 2. Chorale Roanne was promoted after winning the 2025–26 Élite 2 championship, while Élan Béarnais achieved it by winning the promotion playoffs. ESSM Le Portel was relegated to the Élite 2 after finishing last in the previous season while AS Monaco was excluded from the competition due to financial reasons.

=== Promotion and relegation (pre-season) ===
▲ Promoted from Élite 2	▼ Relegated to Élite 2
Chorale Roanne; Élan Béarnais	ESSM Le Portel

=== Venues and locations ===
Location of teams in 2026–27 LNB Élite

Team	Home city	Arena	Capacity
BCM Gravelines-Dunkerque	Gravelines–Dunkirk	Stade des Flandres	2,500
Boulazac	Boulazac	Le Palio	5,200
Cholet	Cholet	La Meilleraie	5,191
Chorale Roanne	Roanne	Halle André Vacheresse	5,020
Élan Béarnais	Pau–Lacq–Orthez	Palais des Sports de Pau	7,707
Élan Chalon	Chalon-sur-Saône	Le Colisée	4,540
JDA Dijon	Dijon	Palais des Sports J.M. Geoffroy	5,000
JL Bourg	Bourg-en-Bresse	Ekinox	3,548
LDLC ASVEL	Lyon–Villeurbanne	Astroballe	5,556
Le Mans Sarthe	Le Mans	Antarès	6,023
Limoges CSP	Limoges	Palais des Sports de Beaublanc	6,506
Nanterre 92	Nanterre	Palais des Sports Maurice Thorez	3,000
Paris Basketball	Paris	Adidas Arena	8,000
Saint-Quentin	Saint-Quentin, Aisne	Palais des Sports Pierre Ratte	3,800
SIG Strasbourg	Strasbourg	Rhénus Sport	6,200
SLUC Nancy	Nancy	Palais des Sports Jean Weille	6,027

== Regular season ==
=== League table ===
Pos	Team	Pld	W	L	PF	PA	PD	PCT	Qualification or relegation
1	Paris Basketball	10	9	1	988	860	+128	.900	Qualification to playoffs
2	JDA Dijon	9	7	2	836	750	+86	.778	Qualification to playoffs
3	Le Mans Sarthe	9	7	2	876	801	+75	.778	Qualification to playoffs
4	LDLC ASVEL	9	6	3	822	801	+21	.667	Qualification to playoffs
5	Chorale Roanne	9	6	3	740	722	+18	.667	Qualification to playoffs
6	Nanterre 92	9	6	3	779	728	+51	.667	Qualification to playoffs
7	Élan Chalon	9	6	3	853	759	+94	.667	Qualification to play-in
8	SIG Strasbourg	10	6	4	817	855	−38	.600	Qualification to play-in
9	Cholet	10	5	5	815	855	−40	.500	Qualification to play-in
10	SLUC Nancy	9	3	6	728	753	−25	.333	Qualification to play-in
11	Boulazac	9	3	6	722	769	−47	.333	
12	JL Bourg	9	3	6	798	828	−30	.333	
13	Élan Béarnais	9	2	7	739	807	−68	.222	
14	Limoges CSP	9	2	7	769	805	−36	.222	
15	Saint-Quentin	10	2	8	863	943	−80	.200	Qualification to relegation playoffs
16	BCM Gravelines-Dunkerque	9	1	8	720	829	−109	.111	Relegation to Élite 2

Updated to match(es) played on 22 November 2026. Source: LNB.fr

=== Results ===
Home \ Away	ASV	BOU	CHO	ROA	BEA	CHA	DIJ	GRA	JLB	LIM	MSB	NAN	NTR	PAB	STQ	STR
ASVEL	—			96–77	106–97				91–101			78–74				
Boulazac		—		79–81				83–69	84–73		72–97					
Cholet	85–97	86–81	—		85–79	77–86	71–97							94–90		
Chorale Roanne				—						85–82			93–83	75–96	80–68	
Élan Béarnais					—		61–89			85–81					102–89	84–89
Élan Chalon		97–74				—				82–74		108–67			104–89	106–79
JDA Dijon							—			108–96	93–77	94–108	91–101			81–72
Gravelines	65–70			69–89			83–92	—			97–103	96–89				
JL Bourg				77–90		90–77		89–81	—				98–101			
Limoges	94–97	89–99								—				82–97	92–75	
Le Mans	109–93				106–97				91–90		—			101–103		
Nancy			76–85		84–70					77–79		—	80–65	73–78		
Nanterre 92			86–69		78–64	93–81		101–73					—			71–79
Paris		90–75				116–112		113–87	107–77					—		98–84
Saint-Quentin	99–94		75–81				81–91		106–103		87–98				—	94–98
Strasbourg		87–75	88–82	72–70							69–94					—

Updated to match(es) played on 22 November 2026. Source: LNB.fr
Legend: Blue = home team win; Red = away team win.
Matches with lighter background shading were decided after overtime.

== French clubs in European competitions ==
Team	Competition	Progress
LDLC ASVEL	EuroLeague	Regular season
Paris Basketball	EuroLeague	Regular season
JL Bourg	EuroCup	Regular season
Le Mans	EuroCup	Regular season
Cholet	Champions League	Regular season
Nanterre 92	Champions League	Regular season
SIG Strasbourg	Champions League	Regular season
Élan Chalon	FIBA Europe Cup	Regular season
SLUC Nancy	FIBA Europe Cup	Regular season
