= Rajko Žižić =

Montenegrin basketball player

Personal information
- Born: January 22, 1955 Miloševići, PR Montenegro, FPR Yugoslavia
- Died: August 7, 2003 (aged 48) Belgrade, Serbia and Montenegro
- Listed height: 2.10 m (6 ft 11 in)

Career information
- NBA draft: 1977: undrafted
- Playing career: 1970–1991
- Position: Center
- Coaching career: 1992–1994

Career history

Playing
- 1970–1971: Sutjeska
- 1971–1981: OKK Beograd
- 1981–1984: Crvena zvezda
- 1984–1986: CAUFA Reims
- 1986–1987: Crvena zvezda
- 1987: Basket Rimini
- 1989–1990: Poštar Beograd
- 1990–1991: OKK Beograd

Coaching
- 1992–1994: OKK Beograd
Medals
Men's basketball
Representing Yugoslavia
Summer Olympics
Gold medal – first place	1980 Moscow	Team competition
Silver medal – second place	1976 Montreal	Team competition
Bronze medal – third place	1984 Los Angeles	Team competition
World Cup
Gold medal – first place	1978 Philippines	Team
Bronze medal – third place	1982 Colombia	Team
EuroBasket
Gold medal – first place	1975 Yugoslavia	Team
Bronze medal – third place	1979 Italy	Team
European Championship for Juniors
Gold medal – first place	1974 France	Team
Gold medal – first place	1972 Yugoslavia	Team
European Championship for Cadets
Gold medal – first place	1971 Italy	Team

Rajko Žižić (January 22, 1955 – August 7, 2003) was a Yugoslavian professional basketball player. The 6'11", 243-pounder represented Yugoslavia at the 1976 Summer Olympics, the 1980 Summer Olympics and the 1984 Summer Olympics, winning silver, gold and bronze respectively. He died on August 7, 2003, from a heart attack.
