= SCPO (basketball) =

Sporting Cheminot de Pratiques Omnisports
- Founded: 1932
- History: 1932–36; Sporting Club de Paris Orleans; 1936-72; Sporting Club de Préparation Olympique; 1972 to present Sporting Cheminot de Pratiques Omnisports
- Location: Paris, France
- Team colors: Red, white
- Championships: 2 French Leagues
Home	Away

Sporting Cheminot de Pratiques Omnisports or simply SCPO is a French basketball club based in Paris, now disappeared from the top-level.

== History ==
In 1919 founded the multi-sports Sporting Club de Paris Orleans, a sports club of railwaymen which consists of 4 sections. In 1932 created the basketball section under the patronage of the backbone of Sportive d’Ivry-Port. In 1936 created the National Society of French Railways (SNCF) and the SCPO then changes its name to Sporting Club de Préparation Olympique. The club under the new name became champion of France in 1935-36 and 1937-38 beating Métro during two final games. In 1966 the basketball section disappears to reappear in 1999. In 1972 SCPO again changes its name to the Sporting Cheminot de Pratiques Omnisports.

== Honours ==
French League

- Winners (2): 1935-36, 1937-38

== Notable players ==
- (France) Jean Deffin
- (France) André Despagne
- (France) Henri Le Men
- (France) Georges Daeschler
- (France) Jean Pierre Meilhat
- (France) Pierre Roussel
- (France) Georges Gizolmes

== Notable coaches ==
- (France) Henri Le Men
- (France) Roger Bracon
