= Vince Taylor (basketball) =

American basketball player (born 1960)

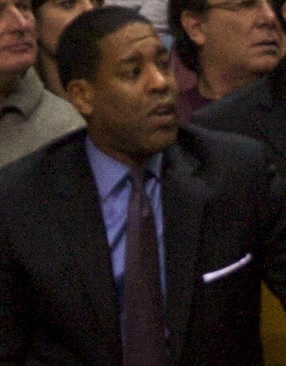
- Taylor in 2009 as Minnesota assistant coach

Tennessee State Tigers
- Title: Assistant coach
- League: Ohio Valley Conference

Personal information
- Born: September 11, 1960 (age 66) Chicago, Illinois, U.S.
- Listed height: 6 ft 5 in (1.96 m)
- Listed weight: 180 lb (82 kg)

Career information
- High school: Tates Creek (Lexington, Kentucky)
- College: Duke (1978–1982)
- NBA draft: 1982: 2nd round, 34th overall pick
- Drafted by: New York Knicks
- Playing career: 1982–1997
- Position: Shooting guard
- Number: 8
- Coaching career: 1997–present

Career history

Playing
- 1982–1983: New York Knicks
- 1983–1984: Wisconsin Flyers
- 1984–1986: Lega Basket Serie A
- 1986–1989: Avignon
- 1989–1990: Nancy
- 1992–1997: Gent Hawks

Coaching
- 1997–1998: Pittsburgh (assistant)
- 1998: Wyoming (assistant)
- 1999–2005: Louisville (assistant)
- 2005–2007: Minnesota Timberwolves (assistant)
- 2007–2013: Minnesota (assistant)
- 2013–2016: Texas Tech (assistant)
- 2017–2021: UCF (assistant)
- 2025–present: Tennessee State (assistant)

Career highlights
- First-team All-ACC (1982); McDonald's All-American (1978); Second-team Parade All-American (1978)

Career statistics
- Points: 95 (3.1 ppg)
- Stats at NBA.com
- Stats at Basketball Reference

Vincent Caldwell Taylor (born September 11, 1960) is an American former professional basketball player who competed in the National Basketball Association (NBA) for one season and is the former assistant coach at Texas Tech University. He played college basketball for the Duke Blue Devils, and in the NBA played for the New York Knicks. Taylor also played briefly in the Continental Basketball Association for the Wisconsin Flyers. Taylor had a successful basketball career in Europe, playing a total 13 seasons on European teams in Italy (1984–86), France (1986–92), and Belgium (1992–97).

Taylor was hired in August 2025 as an assistant coach for the Tennessee State Tigers. He was hired as part of the team's coaching staff restructuring which prepared for the inaugural season of fellow former NBA player Nolan Smith as head coach.

== Career statistics ==
Legend
GP	Games played	GS	Games started	MPG	Minutes per game
FG%	Field goal percentage	3P%	3-point field goal percentage	FT%	Free throw percentage
RPG	Rebounds per game	APG	Assists per game	SPG	Steals per game
BPG	Blocks per game	PPG	Points per game	**Bold**	Career high

=== NBA ===
==== Regular season ====
Year	Team	GP	GS	MPG	FG%	3P%	FT%	RPG	APG	SPG	BPG	PPG
1982–83	New York	31	0	10.4	.363	–	.656	1.2	1.3	.6	.1	3.1
