= Ligue nationale de basket =

French men's basketball governing body

- Formation: 27 June 1987; 39 years ago
- Headquarters: 117, rue du Château des Rentiers; Paris, France
- Coordinates: 48°49′43″N 2°21′58″E
- Director: Alain Béral
- Website: lnb.fr

The Ligue nationale de basket (LNB; English: National Basketball League) is the governing body of men's professional club basketball in France. The LNB organises the first-tier Pro A and the second-tier Pro B. Additionally, the federation annually organises the Leaders Cup, Match des Champions and LNB All-Star Game. The LNB was established in 1987 by a committee consisting of high level professional clubs from France. In 1990, the LNB overtook the CCHN as the organizer of the top tier competition in France.

== List of presidents ==
- 1987–1999: Jean Bayle-Lespitau
- 1999–2003: Alain Pelletier
- 2003–2010: René Le Goff
- 2010–2011: Jean-Luc Desfoux
- 2011–present: Alain Béral

== See also ==
- LNB Pro A
- LNB Pro B
- LNB All-Star Game
- List of basketball clubs in France
