= Foyer alsacien Mulhouse =

French Basketball club

Foyer alsacien Mulhouse, commonly known as FA Mulhouse, was a French basketball club that was based in Mulhouse. The club is now disbanded. The club was best known for its good performance in the top-tier level basketball championship of France, starting in 1920. During its existence, the club had several renowned players. Its rivalry with Mulhousien was the first big rivalry of the French elite basketball championship.

== History ==
The club dissolved in 1949, after it merged with Espérance de Mulhouse, to form the club of Mulhouse BC.

== Honours ==
French League

- Winners (7): 1923–24, 1924–25, 1925–26, 1927–28, 1928–29, 1929–30, 1930–31

== Notable players ==
- (France) Robert Busnel
