= Robert Busnel =

French basketball player and coach

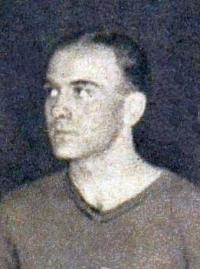
- French professional basketball player, coach, and administrator

Personal information
- Born: 19 September 1914 Toulon, France
- Died: 15 March 1991 (aged 76) Lyon, France
- Listed height: 6 ft 3.75 in (1.92 m)

Career information
- Playing career: 1929–1952
- Position: Power forward
- Coaching career: 1945–1966

Career history

Playing
- 1929–: FA Mulhouse
- –1945: FC Grenoble
- 1946–1947: ESSMG Lyon
- 1947–1949: UA Marseille
- 1949–1952: Racing Club de France

Coaching
- 1945–1957: France Women
- 1947–1957: France
- 1949–1952: Racing Club de France
- 1965–1966: Real Madrid

Career highlights
- As player: 7× French League champion (1930, 1931, 1943, 1944, 1946, 1948, 1951); As head coach: 3× FIBA European Selection (1964, 1966, 1967); Spanish League champion (1966); Spanish Cup winner (1966); French League champion (1951); As contributor: Olympic Order (1990); National Order of Merit (France); Officer of the Legion of Honor (1989); French National Sports Hall of Fame (1994); French Basketball Hall of Fame (2005)
- FIBA Hall of Fame
Medals
Men's basketball
Representing France
EuroBasket
Silver medal – second place	1949 Egypt
Head coach for France
Olympic Games
Silver medal – second place	1948 London
EuroBasket
Silver medal – second place	1949 Egypt
Bronze medal – third place	1951 France
Bronze medal – third place	1953 USSR

Robert Busnel (19 September 1914 – 15 March 1991) was a French professional basketball player, coach, and administrator. During his playing career, the 1.92 m (6'3 3/4") tall Busnel, played at the power forward position. He was made an Officer of the Legion of Honor, in 1989, and was awarded the Olympic Order, by the IOC, in 1990. He was inducted into the French National Sports Hall of Fame in 1994. He was inducted into the French Basketball Hall of Fame, in 2005. In 2007, he was enshrined as a contributor to the FIBA Hall of Fame.

== Basketball playing career ==
During his playing career, Busnel played club basketball with FA Mulhouse, FC Grenoble, ESSMG Lyon, UA Marseille, and Racing Club de France.

Busnel played for the senior French national team, from 1934 to 1949. He played at the 1939 EuroBasket, the 1946 EuroBasket, the 1947 EuroBasket, and the 1949 EuroBasket, where he won a silver medal.

== Basketball coaching career ==
Busnel coached the senior French national women's team, from 1945 to 1957. He won a bronze medal at the 1953 FIBA World Championship for Women. He also coached the senior French national men's team (1947–1957), winning a silver medal at the 1948 Summer Olympic Games, a silver medal at EuroBasket 1949 (he was a player-coach in that tournament), and bronze medals at EuroBasket 1951 and EuroBasket 1953.

In the 1965–66 season, he coached Real Madrid, on the club level.

== Basketball administrative career ==
Busnel was the technical director (1960–1964), and President (1967–1980), of the French Basketball Federation. He was the President of the Standing Conference of Europe (now FIBA Europe), from 1976 to 1982. He served as a President of FIBA, in 1984–1990.

== Personal life and death ==
Busnel received the Croix de Guerre 1939–1945. The French Basketball Cup is named after him, in his honor. Busnel, along with his wife Joëlle, and one of his nephews, died in an auto crash, in 1991, outside of Lyon.

== Awards and accomplishments ==
=== Club playing career ===
- 7× French League Champion: (1930, 1931, 1943, 1944, 1946, 1948, 1951)

=== Club coaching career ===
- French League Champion: (1951)
- 3× FIBA European Selection: (1964, 1966, 1967)
- Spanish League Champion: (1966)
- Spanish Cup Winner: (1966)
