= Philippe Szanyiel =

French basketball player

Philip Szanyiel
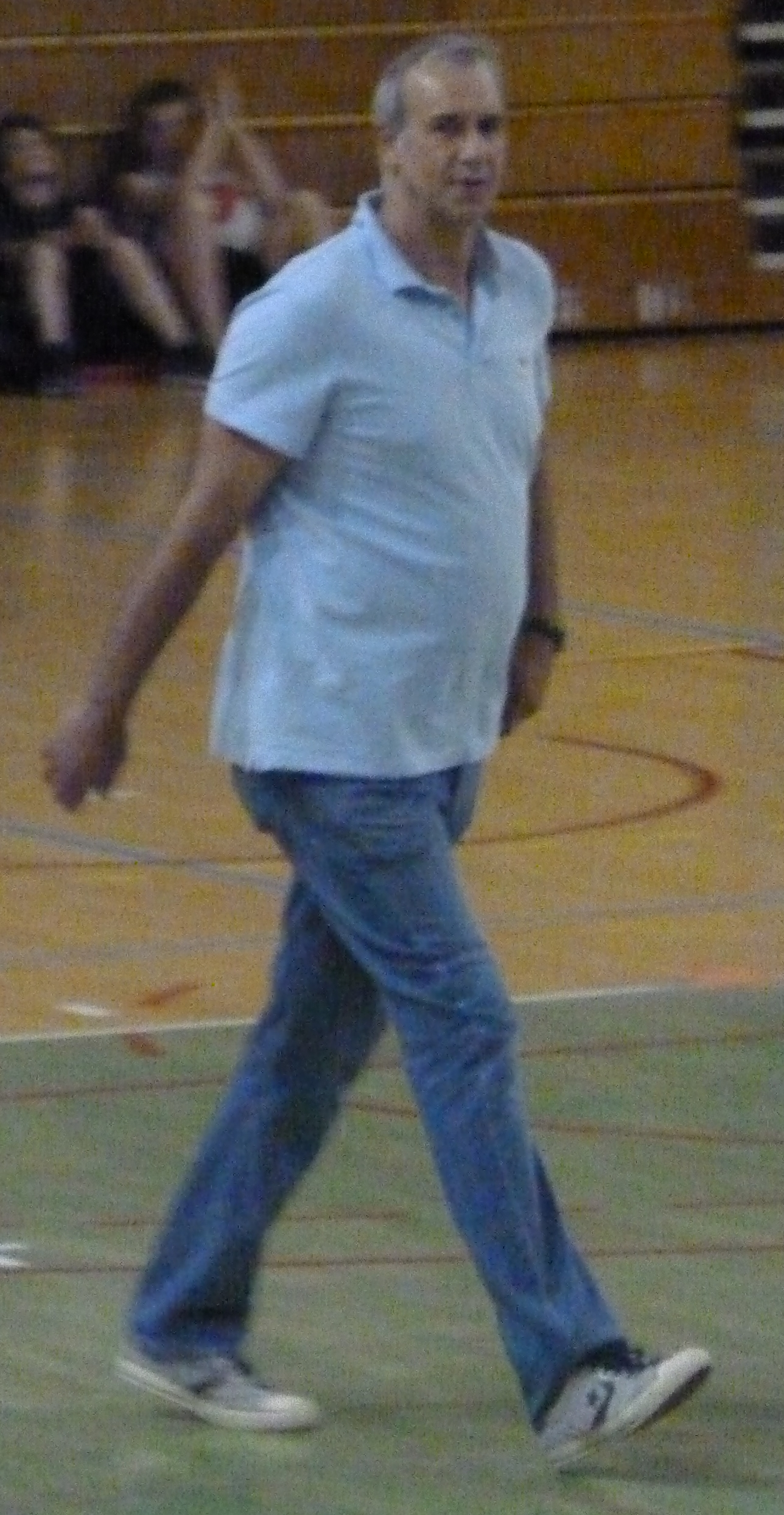
- Philip Szaniel in 2012

Personal information
- Born: 23 December 1960 (age 65) Manosque, France
- Listed height: 6 ft 7.5 in (2.02 m)

Career information
- Playing career: 1976–1994
- Position: Power forward
- Number: 14

Career history

Playing
- 1976–1978: ES Avignon
- 1978–1985: ASVEL
- 1985–1988: AS Monaco
- 1988–1994: Mulhouse

Coaching
- 1997–2000: Limoges (assistant)
- 2000–2001: Mulhouse (assistant)
- 2002: Mulhouse
- 2003–2004: Ajaccio
- 2004–2005: Stade Clermontois BA (assistant)
- 2010–2011: CSP Pont de dore

Career highlights
- As player: FIBA European Selection (1991); French League champion (1981); French Federation Cup winner (1984); French League Cup winner (1988); French League French Player's MVP (1983); French Basketball Hall of Fame (2011)

Philippe "Philip" Szanyiel (born 23 December 1960) is a French former professional basketball player and coach. He was inducted into the French Basketball Hall of Fame, as a player, in 2011.

== Professional career ==
Szanyiel was named to the FIBA European Selection team in 1991. With ASVEL, Szanyiel made it to the 1982–83 season's finals of the secondary level European-wide club competition, the FIBA European Cup Winners' Cup (FIBA Saporta Cup). Szanyiel was the French League's French Player's MVP in 1983.

== National team career ==
With the senior French national team, Szanyiel competed at the following tournaments: the 1980 FIBA European Olympic Qualifying Tournament, the 1981 EuroBasket, the 1983 EuroBasket, the 1984 Summer Olympics, the 1985 EuroBasket, the 1988 FIBA European Olympic Qualifying Tournament, the 1991 EuroBasket, and the 1992 FIBA European Olympic Qualifying Tournament.

With France's senior national team, he scored a total of 2,363 points, in 192 games played.
