= Amadou Aboubakar Zaki =

Nigerien basketball player (born 1988)

Union Rennes Basket 35
- Position: Power forward / center
- League: Nationale Masculin 2

Personal information
- Born: 10 February 1988 (age 38) Niamey, Niger
- Listed height: 7 ft 0 in (2.13 m)

Career information
- NBA draft: 2010: undrafted
- Playing career: 2007–present

Career history
- 2007–2009: SLUC Nancy
- 2011–2012: Denain Voltaire
- 2012–2014: ESSM Le Portel
- 2014–2015: Lille Métropole
- 2016–2017: Svendborg Rabbits
- 2017: SOMB
- 2017–2018: JA Vichy-Clermont Métropole
- 2018: Chorale Roanne
- 2018–2019: Union Rennes

Amadou Aboubakar Zaki (born 10 February 1988) is a Nigerien professional basketball player, who plays for Union Rennes Basket 35. Standing at 7 ft 0 in (2.13 m), Zaki usually plays as power forward or center. Zaki has played in France and in Denmark as a professional player.
