= Élite 2 (basketball) =

Second-level French men's basketball league

- Organising body: Ligue Nationale de Basket (LNB)
- Founded: 1932; 94 years ago
- First season: 1932–33
- Country: France
- Confederation: FIBA Europe
- Number of teams: 20
- Level on pyramid: Level 2
- Promotion to: LNB Élite
- Relegation to: Nationale Masculine 1
- Domestic cup(s): French Cup (Federation Cup); Pro B Leaders Cup (League Cup)
- Current champions: Pau-Lacq-Orthez (2025–26)
- Most championships: JA Vichy (3 titles)
- TV partners: Sport en France
- Website: lnb.fr/pro-b

The Élite 2 is the second-tier level men's professional basketball league in France. It is the second division of the Ligue Nationale de Basket (LNB), which has organized the league since the year 1987. The regular season champion and the winner of the promotion playoffs from each Élite 2 season are promoted to the top-tier level LNB Élite, replaced by the bottom two teams in LNB Élite. The two last placed teams are relegated to the third level, which is the NM1.

== History ==
=== Names of the league ===
- Honneur Ligue (1932–1949)
- Excellence Ligue (1950–1963)
- Nationale 2 (1964–1987)
- Nationale 1B (1987–1992)
- Nationale A2 (1992–1993)
- Pro B (1993–2025)
- Élite 2 (2025–present)

== Format ==
All twenty competing teams play each other twice during the regular season. The team that ends in first place in the table is named league champion and promotes to the LNB Élite. The top eight regular season teams, with exception for the league champion, qualify for the promotion playoffs. During the competition, the Leaders Cup tournament is played. The champion of the Leaders Cup automatically qualifies for the playoffs. The winner of the promotion playoffs, which is played with best-of-three playoff series, promotes to the LNB Élite. The bottom two regular season teams are meanwhile relegated to the third tier Nationale Masculine 1 (NM1) league.

== Current teams ==
These are the current teams for the 2026–27 Élite 2 season:

Club	City	Arena	Capacity
ADA Blois	Blois	Jeu de Paume	2,525
Aix Maurienne Savoie	Aix-les-Bains	Halle Marlioz	1,500
Alliance Sport Alsace (Note: Formed by the merger of five clubs after the 2020–21 season—BC Gries-Oberhoffen and BC Souffelweyersheim, both of which played in the 2020–21 Pro B season, plus BC Nord Alsace, Weyersheim BB and Walbourg-Eschbach Basket.)	Gries & Souffelweyersheim	Espace Sport La Forest	1,700
ALM Évreux	Évreux	Salle Jean Fourré	2,500
Antibes Sharks	Antibes	Azur Arena Antibes	5,249
Béliers de Kemper	Quimper	OS Michel Gloaguen	2,100
Caen	Caen	Palais des Sports of Caen	3,000
Châlons-Reims	Châlons-Reims	Complexe René-Tys; Pierre de Coubertin	3,000; 2,791
Denain Voltaire	Denain	Salle Jean Degros	2,500
Fos Provence	Fos-sur-Mer	Complexe sportif Parsemain	2,000
Hermine Nantes	Nantes	La Trocardière	4,185
Hyères-Toulon Var	Hyères & Toulon	Espace 3000; Palais des Sports de Toulon	2,500; 4,700
La Rochelle	La Rochelle	Salle Gaston-Neveur	2,000
Metropolitans 92	Levallois-Perret	Palais des sports Marcel-Cerdan	4,000
Orléans	Orléans	Palais des Sports	3,222
Poitiers	Poitiers	Saint Eloi	2,700
Rouen Métropole	Rouen	Kindarena	5,789
SCABB Saint-Étienne Métropole	Saint-Chamond	Arena Saint Étienne Métropole	4,200
STB Le Havre	Le Havre	Dock Océane	3,598
Vichy	Vichy	Palais des sports Pierre Coulon	3,200

== Champions ==
=== 1932–1987 ===
Honneur (Honor)

- 1932 Saint-Charles Alfortville
- 1933 SS Nilvange
- 1934 CS Plaisance
- 1935 Métro
- 1936 Racing Paris
- 1937 Championnet
- 1938 AS Cherbourg
- 1939–46 Not held due to WWII
- 1947 Marseille
- 1948 AS Roanne
- 1949 Championnet

Excellence

- 1950 ASC Est Paris
- 1951 Olympique Antibes
- 1952 Olympique de Marseille
- 1953 Métro
- 1954 Racing Paris
- 1955 Étoile de Charleville-Mézières
- 1957 Stade Auto Lyon
- 1958 CO Billancourt
- 1959 Alsace Bagnolet
- 1960 Denain-Voltaire
- 1961 Bordeaux
- 1962 Moderne
- 1963 Stade Français

Nationale 2 (National 2)

- 1964 Denain-Voltaire
- 1965 Caen
- 1966 BC Montbrison
- 1967 Tours
- 1968 Olympique Antibes
- 1969 Paris Université
- 1970 Caen
- 1971 Nantes
- 1972 Vichy
- 1973 Monaco
- 1974 Nice BC
- 1975 Orthez
- 1976 Valenciennes

- 1977 Racing Paris
- 1978 Mulhouse
- 1979 Stade Français
- 1980 Challans
- 1981 Chorale Roanne
- 1982 Nice BC
- 1983 Lyon
- 1984 Saint-Etienne
- 1985 Racing Paris
- 1986 Cholet
- 1987 Gravelines

=== 1988–present ===
Season	Champions	Promoted teams
1987–88	Montpellier PSC	Saint-Quentin BB, BCM Gravelines
1988–89	Reims CB	Chorale Roanne
1989–90	SCM Le Mans	JDA Dijon
1990–91	Lyon	
1991–92	Levallois SC	ESPE Châlons-en-Champagne
1992–93	ASA Sceaux	
1993–94	SLUC Nancy	SIG Strasbourg
1994–95	Besançon BCD	ALM Évreux
1995–96	Toulouse Spacer's	Élan Chalon
1996–97	Maurienne Savoie	Toulouse Spacer's
1997–98	Levallois SC (2)	
1998–99	SIG Strasbourg	ESPE Châlons-en-Champagne
1999–00	JL Bourg	STB Le Havre
2000–01	Limoges	Hyères Toulon VB
2001–02	JA Vichy	Chorale Roanne
2002–03	Reims CB (2)	Besançon BCD
2003–04	Stade Clermontois Basket	ESPE Châlons-en-Champagne
2004–05	Étendard de Brest	SPO Rouen
2005–06	Entente Orléanaise	Besançon BCD
2006–07	JA Vichy (2)	
2007–08	Besançon BCD (2)	SPO Rouen
2008–09	Poitiers	Paris-Levallois
2009–10	Élan Béarnais Pau-Lacq-Orthez	Limoges
2010–11	Nanterre	Dijon
2011–12	Limoges	Boulazac
2012–13	Olympique Antibes	Élan Béarnais Pau-Orthez
2013–14	Boulogne-sur-Mer	JL Bourg, SPO Rouen, Champagne Châlons-Reims (Note: In the 2013–14 season, two extra teams (SPO Rouen and Châlons-Reims) were promoted to the 2014–15 Pro A season because of the expansion of the Pro A from 16 to 18 teams.)
2014–15	Monaco (2)	Antibes Sharks
2015–16	Hyères-Toulon	ESSM Le Portel
2016–17	JL Bourg	Boulazac Dordogne
2017–18	ADA Blois	
2018–19	Roanne	Orleans Loiret
2019–20	Canceled due to the COVID-19 pandemic	
2020–21	Fos	Paris
2021–22	SLUC Nancy (2)	ADA Blois
2022–23	Saint-Quentin	Élan Chalon
2023–24	Stade Rochelais	Caen, Chartres, HTV
2024–25	Boulazac	
2025–26	Chorale Roanne	Pau-Lacq-Orthez

== Logos ==
(The official current logo of the league 2017–present).

(The previous official logo of the league until 2017.)

== Awards ==
=== LNB Pro B Best Coach and Most Improved Player ===
Year	LNB Pro B Best Coach	LNB Pro B Most Improved Player
2006	(France) François Peronnet (Châlons-en-Champagne)	–
2007	(France) Olivier Cousin (Quimper)	–
2008	(France) Michel Veyronnet (Rouen)	–
2009	(France) Ruddy Nelhomme (Poitiers)	–
2010	(France) Didier Dobbels (Pau-Lacq-Orthez)	–
2011	(France) Pascal Donnadieu (JSF Nanterre)	–
2012	(France) Frédéric Sarre (Limoges)	(France) Ferdinand Prénom (Antibes)
2013	(France) Rémy Valin (Évreux)	(France) Mam Jaiteh (Boulogne-sur-Mer)
2014	(France) Germain Castano (Boulogne-sur-Mer)	(France) Olivier Romain (Saint-Quentin)
2015	(France) Laurent Legname (Hyères-Toulon)	(France) Mathieu Wojciechowski (Le Portel)
2016	(France) Kyle Milling (Hyères-Toulon)	(France) Isaia Cordinier (Denain)
2017	(France) Cédric Heitz (Charleville-Mézières)	(France) Arthur Rozenfeld (Roanne)

== See also ==
- LNB Pro B Leaders Cup
- List of basketball clubs in France
