= Salle Marcel Cerdan =

Indoor sporting arena located in Brest, France

Coordinates: 48°23′24″N 4°28′44″W

Salle Marcel Cerdan was an indoor sporting arena located in Brest, France. The arena opened in 1950. It had a capacity 2,000 people and was home to the former Étendard de Brest basketball team. The Salle ("hall", i.e., sports hall) was named after Marcel Cerdan, a French boxer.

As of September 2020, the site was to be demolished, and a residential area was to be built on the 1.3 hectare plot.
