= André Buffière =

French basketball player and coach

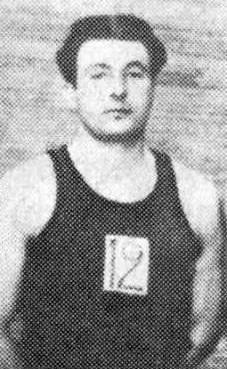

Personal information
- Born: 12 November 1922 Vion, Ardèche, France
- Died: 2 October 2014 (aged 91)
- Listed height: 6 ft 1 in (1.85 m)
- Listed weight: 190 lb (86 kg)

Career information
- Playing career: 1945–1957
- Position: Shooting guard
- Coaching career: 1948–1987

Career history

Playing
- 1945–1947: ESSMG Lyon
- 1947–1948: UA Marseille
- 1948–1955: ASVEL
- 1955–1957: ESSMG Lyon

Coaching
- 1948–1955: ASVEL
- 1955–1957: SA Lyon
- 1957–1964: France
- 1964–1970: SA Lyon
- 1970–1973: SCM Le Mans
- 1973–1980: ASVEL
- 1980–1983: CSP Limoges
- 1986–1987: Racing Club France

Career highlights
- As player: 6× French League champion (1946, 1948–1950, 1952, 1955); French Cup winner (1953); French National Sports Hall of Fame (1995); French Basketball Hall of Fame (2004); As head coach: 2× FIBA Korać Cup champion (1982, 1983); 6× French League champion (1950, 1952, 1955, 1975, 1977, 1983); 3× French Cup winner (1953, 1982, 1983); Knight of the Legion of Honor (1998)
Medals
Men's basketball
Representing France
Summer Olympics
Silver medal – second place	1948 London	Team
EuroBasket
Silver medal – second place	1949 Cairo
Bronze medal – third place	1951 Paris
Bronze medal – third place	1953 Moscow

Pierre André Buffière (12 November 1922 – 2 October 2014) was a French basketball player and coach. He was born in Vion, Ardèche. He was inducted into the French National Sports Hall of Fame in 1995. He was inducted into the French Basketball Hall of Fame, in 2004.

== Club playing career ==
During his club career, Buffière won 6 French League championships, in the years 1946, 1948, 1949, 1950, 1952, and 1955, and the French Cup, in 1953.

== National team playing career ==
Buffière played at the 1948 Summer Olympic Games, and at the 1952 Summer Olympic Games. At the 1948 London Olympic Games, he was a part of the senior French national team that won the silver medal. Four years later, at the 1952 Helsinki Olympic Games, he was a member of the French team, which finished in eighth place.

== Coaching career ==
Buffière had a long career as a basketball coach. As a head coach on the club level, he was a two time FIBA Korać Cup champion (1982, 1983), a six time French League champion (1950, 1952, 1955, 1975, 1977, 1983), and a three time French Cup winner (1953, 1982, 1983). He was also the head coach of the senior French national basketball team, from 1957 to 1964.
