= Étendard de Brest =

- Nickname: La Breizh Team
- Founded: 1952
- Dissolved: 2016
- Arena: Salle Marcel Cerdan
- Capacity: 2,200
- Location: Brest, France
| Home | Away |

Étendard de Brest was a basketball club based in Brest, France. Their home arena was Salle Marcel Cerdan. Established in 1952, Brest played one season in the LNB Pro A, in 2005–06. After being relegated to the Nationale Masculine 1 (NM1) in 2010, the club was declared bankrupt and was dissolved in 2016.

The club also played several matches in the Brest Arena in 2015 and 2016. Brest reached the quarter-finals of the French Basketball Cup once, in 2005.

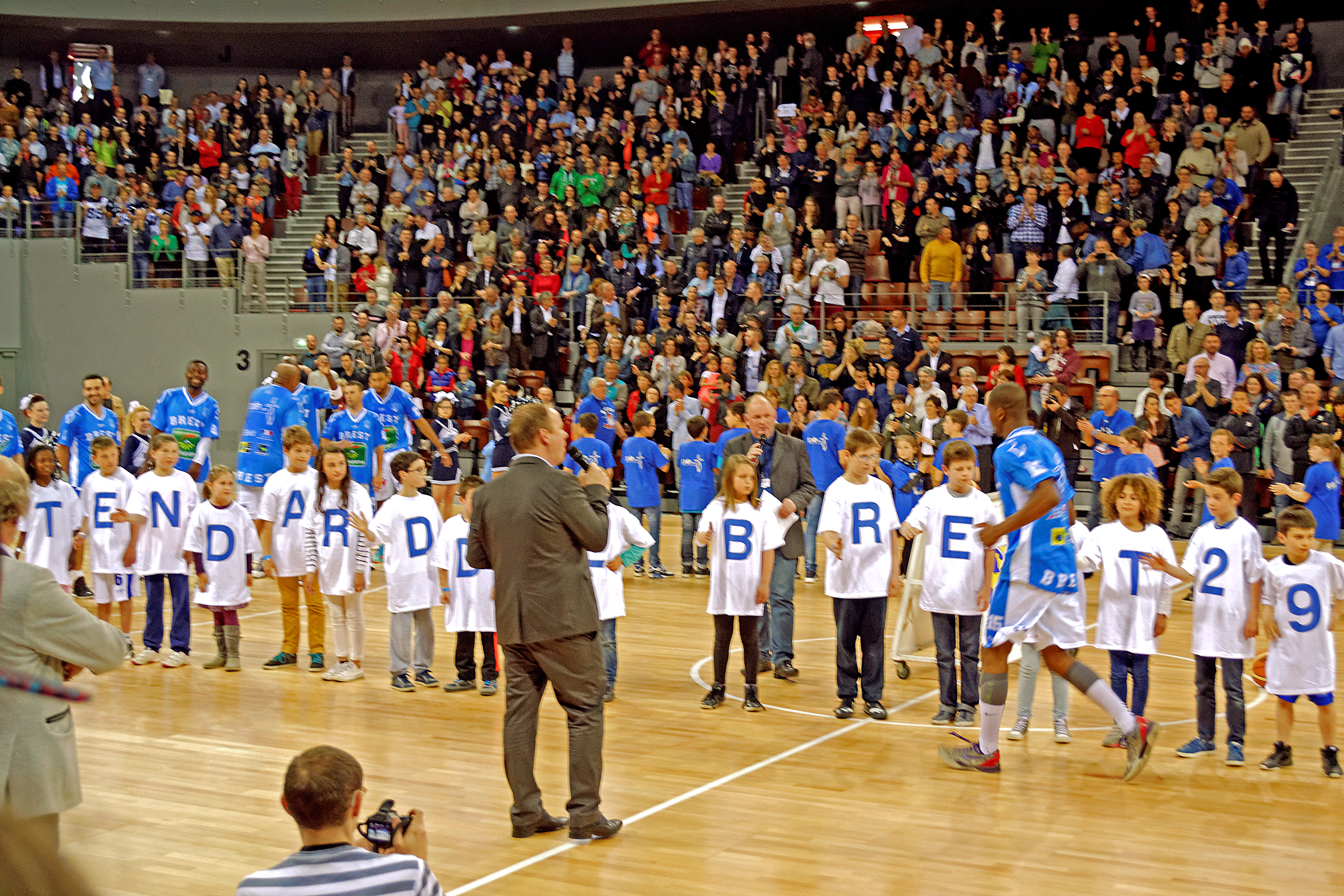
First Étendard game in the Brest Arena in 2015

== Club Honors ==
- LNB Pro B
  - Winners (1): 2004–05

== Players ==
=== Notable players ===
Note: Flags indicate national team eligibility at FIBA-sanctioned events. Players may hold other non-FIBA nationalities not displayed.

Criteria

To appear in this section a player must have either:

- Set a club record or won an individual award while at the club
- Played at least one official international match for their national team at any time
- Played at least one official NBA match at any time.

- (Republic of the Congo) Loic Akono
- (Cameroon) Brice Vounang
