= FC Grenoble (basketball) =

French basketball club (1920–1944)

- Founded: 1920
- History: 1920–45
- Location: Grenoble, France
- Team colors: Dark blue, red
- Head coach: Pierre Vincent
- Championships: 2 French Leagues
Home	Away

Football Club Grenoble Basket was a French basketball club that was based in Grenoble, France. The club is now disbanded.

== History ==
The club was a section of the multi-sports club FC Grenoble. It was a two-time champion of France, in 1942–43 and 1943–44. The club played in the top-tier level championship of French basketball, the Pro A, starting in 1920, and it was also known mostly for the great performances in the period between 1940–44, counting among its members several renowned players, including Robert Busnel. After the liberation by the Allied troops (1944), the club was disbanded, but the team moved with much of its workforce and was "recreated" in Lyon.

The new club, with the new name of Éveil Lyon, became the champions of France in 1946. Two years later, that club would merge with AS Villeurbanne to form a new multi-sports club whose basketball section, now known as ASVEL Basket, would go on to win a record 18 French championships.

== Honours ==
French League

- Winners (2): 1942–43, 1943–44

== Notable players ==
- (France) Robert Busnel
- (France) Wladimir Fabrikant
