= SOMB Boulogne-sur-Mer =

SOMB
- Leagues: Nationale Masculine 1
- Founded: 5 September 1935; 90 years ago
- Arena: Salle Damrémont
- Capacity: 2,000
- Location: Boulogne-sur-Mer, France
- President: Jean-Pierre Desgardin
- Head coach: Germain Castano
- Championships: 1 Pro B
- Website: somb.fr
Home	Away

Stade Olympique Maritime Boulonnais, commonly known as SOMB, is a French professional basketball club based in Boulogne-sur-Mer, France. The team currently plays in the French third division, the Nationale Masculine 1.

== History ==
SOMB was founded on 5 September 1935. In the first years, basketball remained dormant in the club; the first games were played in the 1939–40 season. After a stop of activities during World War II, the team became an official FFBB team in 1945. In 1953 the club started its bigger development: youth teams were added and the first team played in the national Second Division.

In the 2013–14 season, SOMB won the Pro B, and promoted to the Pro A for the first time. They were relegated back to Pro B after the season.

== Honours ==
- Pro B

Champions (1): 2013–14

== Season by season ==
Season	Tier	League	Pos.	French Cup	European competitions
2011–12	2	Pro B	7th		
2012–13	2	Pro B	4th		
2013–14	2	Pro B	1st		
2014–15	1	Pro A	17th		
2015–16	2	Pro B	12th		
2016–17	1	Pro B	16th		

== Players ==
=== Current roster ===
Note: Flags indicate national team eligibility at FIBA-sanctioned events. Players may hold other non-FIBA nationalities not displayed.

SOMB Boulogne-sur-Mer roster
Players
Coaches

Pos.	No.	Nat.	Name
PG		(United States)	Diante Watkins
PG	1	(United States)	Tyreek Duren
PG	4	(United States)	Teddy Gipson
PG	5	(France)	Alexandre Moisy
SG	6	(Netherlands)	Worthy de Jong
SF	7	(France)	Kevin Mendy
C	8	(France)	Cedric Andre
SG	9	(France)	Xavier Corosine
SG	11	(France)	Kadri Moendadze
F/C	12	(United States)	Germain Jordan
C	14	(France)	Adolphe Michel Jean-Baptiste
C	15	(Cuba)	Grismay Paumier
C	20	(Niger)	Amadou Aboubakar Zaki

Head coach

- (France) Germain Castano

Assistant coach(es)

- (United States) Mike Gonsalves
- (France) Thibault Wolicki

Legend

- (C) Team captain
- Injured

- Roster
Updated: 2017-05-05

=== Notable players ===
Note: Flags indicate national team eligibility at FIBA-sanctioned events. Players may hold other non-FIBA nationalities not displayed.

Criteria

To appear in this section a player must have either:

- Set a club record or won an individual award while at the club
- Played at least one official international match for their national team at any time
- Played at least one official NBA match at any time.

- (France) Mouhammadou Jaiteh
- (France) (Israel) Arthur Rozenfeld
- (Republic of the Congo) Loïc Akono
- (Netherlands) Worthy de Jong
- (Nigeria) Aloysius Anagonye
- (United States) Jason Boone
- (United States) Kenny Boynton
- (United States) Tweety Carter
- (United States) Alando Tucker
