= Championnet Sports =

- Founded: 1914
- History: 1914–present
- Location: Paris, France
- Team colors: Blue and white
- Championships: 1 French League; 2 French Leagues 2
- Website: Official site
Home	Away

Championnet Sports is a French basketball club based in Paris. This is one of many sections of the sports club Championnet Sports whose socio-educational and cultural activities as well as the very important real estate is managed by a third association, the Association Championnet.

The club is best known for its good performance in the championship of France basketball from 1940, counting among its members several prominent players.

== History ==
In 1891 Championnet founded in the parish "St. Genevieve Great Careers." Various activities are pushing to declare in 1907 a multi-sports association affiliated to the Sports Championnet FGSPF. It was not until 1914 to identify the first game of basketball. Then the section is gradually developing into Champion of France in 1945 and provide three players to the team of France in 1948 during the London Olympic Games.

The club then participates in first five France championship seasons of basketball (1950–1954) and descends the 1954–55 season in Division Excellence. It goes back to a season in National Division in 1955–56 and reappears there one last time in 1961–62. The association then refusing to follow the evolution of basketball to the professionalism and the basketball section falls into anonymity. The Championnet Sports Association remains, although they practice other activities in a sporting or recreational purposes, but also for social inclusion.

== Honours ==
French League

- Winners (1): 1944–45

French League 2

- Winners (2): 1936–37, 1948–49

== Notable players ==
- (France) Henri Lesmayoux
- (France) Maurice Desaymonet
- (France) Maurice Girardot
- (France) André Barrais
- (France) Pierre Savetier

== Head coaches ==
- (France) Henri Lesmayoux (1949–53 & 1955–62)
- (France) Maurice Girardot (1953–54)
