= Union athlétique de Marseille =

French basketball club

Union athlétique de Marseille, commonly known as UA Marseille, was a French basketball club from the city of Marseille. The club existed from 1940 to 1949. It competed in the top-tier level French League, and won the league's championship in 1948.

== Honours ==
French League

- Champions (1): 1947–48

French League 2

- Champions (1): 1946–47

== Notable players ==
- (France) André Buffière
- (France) Robert Busnel
- (France) René Chocat
- (Hungary) - (France) François Németh
