= US Métro (basketball) =

Union Sportive Métropolitaine des Transports or simply Métro is a French basketball club that has seen the elite league in France the period from 1930 to 1940. The club founded in 1928, was based in Paris, and also was a section of sports club of the Metropolitan Sports Transport Union. The team has since disappeared and no longer changes at the local level or corporate events.

The women's section has significantly experienced the same history and the same fate.

== History ==
Métro participated in the first edition of the new National Division championship of France in 1949-1950 and is relegated to Division Excellence. The club return to the great division for the 1965-1966 season.

== Honours ==
French League

- Winners (2): 1938-39, 1941–42

French League 2

- Winners (2): 1934-35, 1952–53

== Notable players ==
- (France) Paul Hotille
- (France) Étienne Roland
- (France) André Tartary

== Head coaches ==
- (France) Henri Hell
- (France) André Tartary
