= Franck Cazalon =

French basketball player

Franck Cazalon (born 2 September 1957 in Paris, France) is a French basketball player who played 17 times for the men's French national basketball team between 1980 and 1985.
