= Olympique Lille Basket =

Defunct French basketball club

Olympique Lille
- Founded: 1924
- Location: Lille, France

The basketball section of Olympique Lille (OL) founded in 1924.

== History ==
Although the OL was born in 1902, the club created the basketball section in 1924.

== Notable players ==
Peter Boel was called for national team of France. He participated in the first EuroBasket in the history in 1935 but also on the basketball tournament of the 1936 Olympic Games, the first appearance of this sport at the Olympics. Georges Fontaine and Charles Fonteyne also played on olympique tournament.
