= Cercle athlétique mulhousien =

French basketball club

Cercle athlétique mulhousien was a French basketball club based in Mulhouse.

== History ==
The club is best known for its good performance in the championship of France basketball from 1920, counting among its members several prominent players.

The rivalry with Foyer alsacien Mulhouse is one of the first for the elite basketball division.

The women's section won for the first time the championship of France in 1937.

== Honours ==
Men

French League

- Winners (2): 1934-35, 1936–37

Women

French League

- Winners (1): 1936-37

== Notable players ==
- (France) Charles Hemmerlin
- (France) Étienne Onimus
