= Paris Université Club (basketball) =

PUC
- Founded: 1906
- History: 1906–Present
- Arena: Stade Charléty - Salle Charpy
- Capacity: 1,500
- Location: Paris, France
- Team colors: Purple and white
- Championships: 2 French Leagues; 4 French Cups
Home	Away

Paris Université Club or simply PUC is a French University-based basketball team in Paris.

== History ==
Paris Université was founded in 1906. This section of the sports club PUC has disappeared from the landscape of the French elite basketball with the transition to professionalism (contrary to the purpose of a university team), and now evolving at a regional level. PUC was in the elite of the French basketball for fifteen years from 1947 where the club won its first league title until 1963 to win the double in domestic competitions. During this time, put it to the collection of two French Leagues and four national cups.

Paris Université has only one participation in European competitions in 1963-64 season and even the FIBA European Champions Cup. In the first round excluded Luxembourg Etzella Ettelbruck with two wins (73-57 in Ettelbruck and 72-57 in Paris) while in the round of 16 they faced the great Yugoslav OKK Belgrade of Radivoj Korać, Trajko Rajković and Aleksandar Nikolić. Because Paris Université couldn't travel to Belgrade to play the first leg after all fights to the Yugoslavian capital were cancelled due to adverse weather. Later, FIBA decided that this tie should be played as a single game in Paris (16 January 1964). PUC crashed in its homecourt with 63-105 score and eliminated.

== Honours ==
French League

- Winners (2): 1946–47, 1962–63

French Cup

- Winners (4): 1953–54, 1954–55, 1961–62, 1962-63

== Notable players ==
Note: Flags indicate national team eligibility at FIBA-sanctioned events. Players may hold other non-FIBA nationalities not displayed.

Criteria

To appear in this section a player must have either:

- Set a club record or won an individual award while at the club
- Played at least one official international match for their national team at any time
- Played at least one official NBA match at any time.

- (France) Roger Antoine
- (France) Jacques Flouret
- (France) Emile Frezot
- (France) Michel Rat
- (France) Jacky Renaud
- (France) Michel Longueville

== See also ==
- Fédération Française de Basket-Ball
