= Étoile Charleville-Mézières =

- Leagues: Nationale Masculine 1
- Founded: 1921
- Arena: L'Arena
- Capacity: 2960
- Location: Charleville-Mézières, France
- Team colors: Blue and White
- President: (France) Luc Torres
- Head coach: (France) Jimmy Ploegaerts
- Championships: 2 French League; 2 French Cups; 1 French Second League
- Website: Official website
Home	Away

Étoile Charleville-Mézières (French pronunciation: [etwal ʃaʁləvil mezjɛʁ], "Charleville-Mézières Star") is a French professional basketball club, that is based in Charleville-Mézières. The team currently plays in the Nationale Masculine 1 (3rd division of the French basketball championship)

== History ==
The club founded in 1921 in Charleville-Mézières. In 1958, the club moved to Charleville and after the merger of Charleville Mézières and in 1966, the association became Etoile of Charleville-Mézières. Ardenne's club disappears from the top French level, then it rises in national 2 (NM2) in 1999, NM1 in 2004 and Pro B in 2005 before declining in NM1 after the season 2005–2006. At the end of the 2007–2008 season, the Etoile of Charleville Mézières back in Pro B being second NM1 and during the 2008–2009 season, the Etoile of Charleville Mézières surprised everyone by integrating into the play- Pro B offs while back only 1 of the National.

The club played at the Salle Dubois-Crancé before negotiating to host its matches at the Salle Bayard from 2011 onward, until a shared facility with 2,903 seats became available in Hall B of the exhibition center. This new hall, named the Caisse d’Epargne Arena following a partnership agreement, was inaugurated in September 2015.

Ending last Pro B in the 2010–11 season, the team is demoted in NM1 but there remains one season: it is promoted in Pro B at the end of the 2011–12 season NM1 winning the final of the playoffs against Blois. The Etoile of Charleville Mézières is only one season in Pro B in NM1 and down for the 2013–14 season. But she did not stay long because for the 2014–15 season will be again in Pro B, despite the announcement of his late accession. After six wins for twenty-eight losses in the 2017–2018 French Pro B Basketball Championship, the Etoile is relegated to NM1 for the following season.

In the summer of 2019, the club was administratively relegated to NM2.

Six years after leaving it, the Charleroi club returned to National 1. A place that the FFBB granted it following its 2023/2024 season in National 2 (3rd position with 18 wins and 8 losses) and the precaurious financial situation experienced by many elite clubs, Pro B, National 1 and National 2.

== Sports results ==
=== Awards ===
French League 2

- Winners (1): 1954–55

French Cup

- Winners (2): 1957–58, 1958–59

French League

- Winners (2): 1957–58, 1959–60

European Champion Clubs Cup

- 1/4 finals (1): 1958–59

NM1

- Vice-champion (1): 2007–08

NM1

- Play-Off Champion (1): 2011–12

NM1

- Play-Off finalist (1): 2013–14

=== Report by season ===
Season	Div.	Rank.	%Vic	Vic	Def	Playoffs	French Cup	Leaders Cup	Coach
2002–2003	NM2	1st	–	–	–	–	–	–	(United States) Mike Gonsalves
2003–2004	NM1	3rd	66,6%	20	10	–	–	–	(United States) Mike Gonsalves
2004–2005	Pro B	16th	21,8%	7	25	–	First phase	–	(United States) Mike Gonsalves
2005–2006	Pro B	18th	32,3%	11	23	–	Second phase	–	(United States) Mike Gonsalves – (France) Youssou Cissé
2006–2007	NM1	3rd	76,4%	26	8	–	First phase	–	(Serbia) Nikola Antić
2007–2008	NM1	2nd	76,4%	26	8	–	Second phase	–	(Serbia) Nikola Antić
2008–2009	Pro B	6th	38,2%	13	21	Quarter finals	–	–	(Serbia) Nikola Antić
2009–2010	Pro B	12th	38,2%	13	21	–	First phase	–	(Serbia) Nikola Antić
2010–2011	Pro B	18th	17,6%	6	28	–	First phase	–	(France) Rodrigue M'Baye – (France) Francis Charneux
2011–2012	NM1	4th	70,5%	24	10	Winner	First phase	–	(France) Francis Charneux
2012–2013	Pro B	18th	14,7%	5	29	–	First phase	–	(France) Francis Charneux
2013–2014	NM1	3rd	70,5%	24	10	Finalist	First phase	–	(France) Cédric Heitz
2014–2015	Pro B	16th	35,2%	12	22		Round of 16	Pro B : Group phase	(France) Cédric Heitz
2015–2016	Pro B	11th	50%	17	17		Quarter finals	Quarter finals	(France) Cédric Heitz
2016–2017	Pro B	5th	55,8%	19	15	Quarter finals	Round of 32	Pro B : Group phase	(France) Cédric Heitz
2017–2018	Pro B	18th	17,6%	6	28	–	Round of 16	Pro B : Group phase	(France) (United States) Alexandre Casimiri
2018–2019	NM1	8th – Phase 1 (Group A)	50%	18	18	Round of 16	Round of 64	–	(France) (United States) Alexandre Casimiri
2018–2019	NM1	3th – Phase 2 (Group B)	50%	18	18	Round of 16	Round of 64	–	(France) (United States) Alexandre Casimiri
2019–2020	NM2	5th	63,1%	12	7	–	–	–	(France) Fabien Calvez
2020–2021	NM2	4th	80%	4	1	–	–	–	(France) Fabien Calvez
2021–2022	NM2	4th	61,5%	16	10	–	–	–	(France) Fabien Calvez
2022–2023	NM2	8th	42,3%	11	15	–	–	–	(France) Jimmy Ploegaerts
2023–2024	NM2	3rd	69,2%	18	8	–	–	–	(France) Jimmy Ploegaerts
2024–2025	NM1	12th – Phase 1 (Group B)	40%	16	24	–	Round of 64	–	(France) Jimmy Ploegaerts
2024–2025	NM1	9th – Phase 2 (Group B)	40%	16	24	–	Round of 64	–	(France) Jimmy Ploegaerts
2025–2026	NM1	12th - Phase 1 (Group B)	50%	20	20	-	Round of 64	-	(France) Jimmy Ploegaerts
2025–2026	NM1	3rd - Phase 2 (Groupe B)	50%	20	20	-	Round of 64	-	(France) Jimmy Ploegaerts

== Players and personalities ==
=== Current roster (2026–2027) ===
Étoile de Charleville-Mézières roster
Players
Coaches

Pos.	No.	Nat.	Name	Ht.	Wt.	Age
PG	4	(France)	Marbaise, Mathyas	1.84 m (6 ft 0 in)		18 – 8 December 2007
PG	5	(France)	Depaix, Lucas	1.91 m (6 ft 3 in)		25 – 20 January 2001
PG	6	(France)	Michineau, Sébastien	1.82 m (6 ft 0 in)	170 lb (77 kg)	35 – 3 April 1991
PG	7	(France)	Allard, Yannis	2.01 m (6 ft 7 in)		19 – 5 January 2007
SG	8	(France)	Courtois, Martin	1.91 m (6 ft 3 in)		28 – 4 December 1997
SF	9	(France)	Kieger, Pierre-Baptiste	1.99 m (6 ft 6 in)	213 lb (97 kg)	34 – 2 April 1992
SF	10	(France)	Klein, Thomas	2.02 m (6 ft 8 in)		23 – 27 December 2002
PF	11	(France)	Minfir, Tyron	2.01 m (6 ft 7 in)		23 – 21 December 2002
SF	12	(France)	Depaix, Loïc	1.91 m (6 ft 3 in)		28 – 25 March 1998
C	14	(France)	Tonji, Mario	2.05 m (6 ft 9 in)	249 lb (113 kg)	27 – 23 July 1999
C	15	(Serbia)	Kovanusic, Nemanja	2.05 m (6 ft 9 in)	259 lb (117 kg)	33 – 19 March 1993

Head coach

- (France) Jimmy Ploegaerts

Assistant coach(es)

- (France) Alexis Banc
- (France) Ludovic Depaix
- (France) Alizée Boudrique

Legend

- (C) Team captain
- Injured

- Roster
Updated: September 16, 2026

=== Notable players ===
- (France) (Israel) Frédéric Bourdillon
- (Belgium) François De Pauw
- (France) Jean-Paul Beugnot
- (Iceland) Martin Hermannsson

=== Coaches ===
- 19??–1956: (France) Roland Marlet
- 1956–1958: (France) Jean-Paul Beugnot
- 1958–1967: (France) Jean Perniceni
- 2002–2006: (United States) Mike Gonsalves
- March 2006 – June 2006: (France) Youssou Cissé
- 2007–2010: (Serbia) Nikola Antić
- 2010 – December 2010: (France) Rodrigue M'Baye
- December 2010–2013: (France) Francis Charneux
- 2013–2017: (France) Cédric Heitz
- 2017–2019: (France) (United States) Alexandre Casimiri
- 2019–2022: (France) Fabien Calvez
- 2022–present: (France) Jimmy Ploegaerts
