= UB Chartres Métropole =

- Leagues: Nationale Masculine 1
- Founded: 1998; 28 years ago
- Arena: Halle Jean Cochet
- Capacity: 1,200
- Location: Chartres, France
- Team colors: White and Blue
- President: Jean-Léon Piat
- Head coach: Zoran Durdevic
- Championships: 1 French Fourth League; 1 French Fifth League
- Website: ubcmbasket.com
Home	Away

Union Basket Chartres Métropole, commonly known as UB Chartres Métropole or UBCM, is a basketball club that is based in the city of Chartres, France. The club currently plays in the Nationale Masculine 1 (NM1), the third tier of French basketball.

== History ==
UBCM reached the National 3 in 2005 and spent five seasons there before reaching the NM2 where there is only a season by succeeding in realizing two rises in two years. Indeed, the club ends on the first place of one of four groups of this division. Following playoffs, the club ends finally third of National 2 and obtains its entry to the NM1, the third tier of French basketball.

== Honours ==
- Nationale Masculine 2
  - Winners (2): 2009–10, 2010–11
- Nationale Masculine 3
  - Winners (2): 2008–09, 2009–10
