= CAUFA Reims =

French basketball club

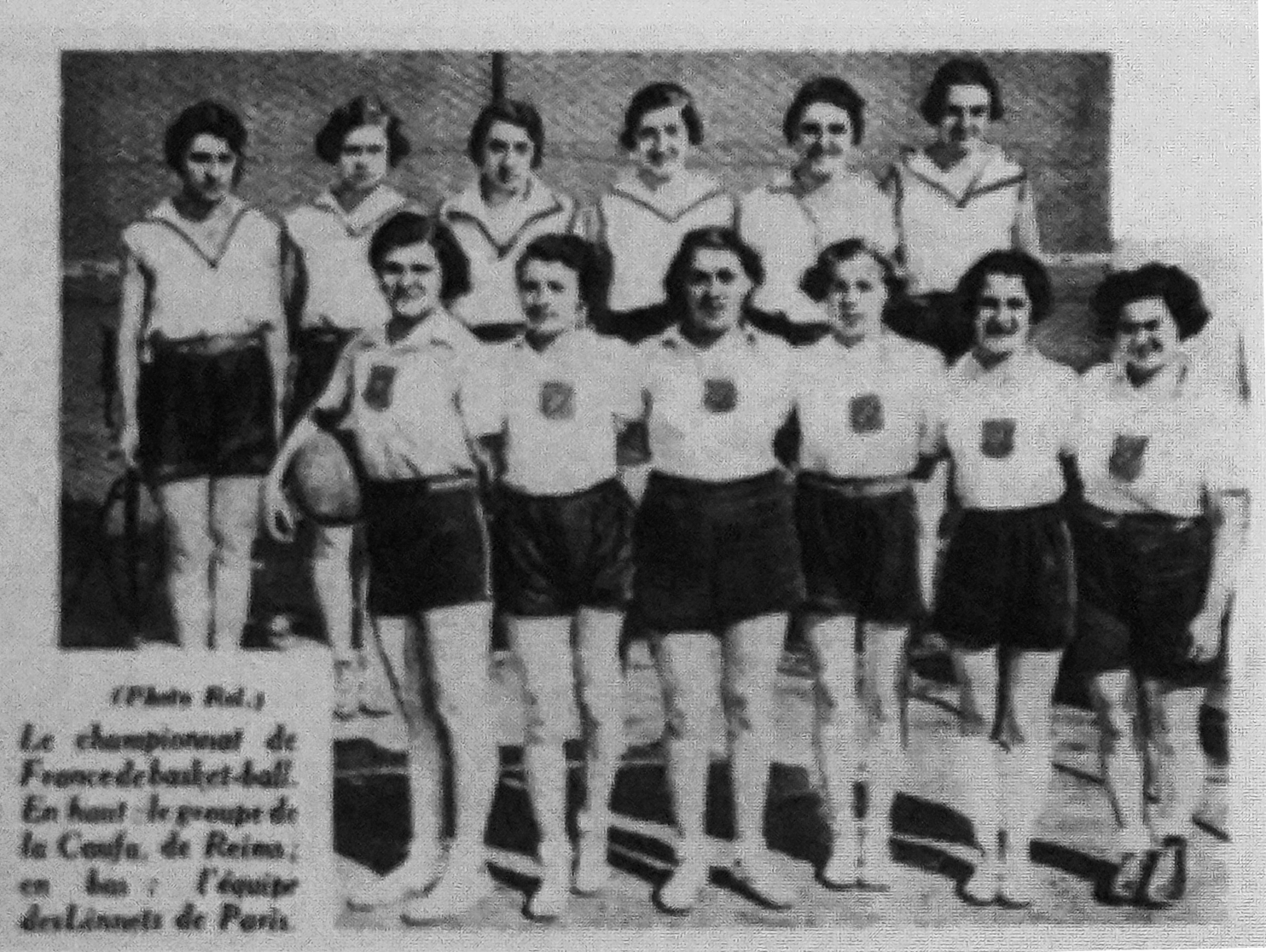
- Founded: 1919
- History: 1919–49
- Location: Reims, France
- Team colors: Blue, red
- Championships: 2 French Leagues
Home	Away

Centre Athlétique de l'Union Franco-Américaine de Reims or simply Reims was a French basketball club based in Reims. The club was known for its excellent performances in the championship of France basketball in the 1930s, counting among its members several international players.

== History ==
CAUFA was founded in 1919 in the foyer of the Civil Union Franco-American Reims (7 Peace Boulevard became the CRDP Reims). In 1915, Emmanuel Sautter, a French general secretary of the National Alliance of YMCAs / YMCA of France from 1895 to 1910 and the World Alliance of YMCAs / YMCA from 1910 to 1915, founded the home of the soldier, funded by the American YMCA (Protestant youth movement at the origin of basketball in 1893). The association took the company name of the Franco-American Union in honor of the American patrons. In 1919, the association introduced basketball. In the 1930s, the male and female teams were at the top of the poster of French basketball. In 1939 the section was mothballed, war approached and the buildings were requisitioned. In 1942, the club attempted recovery and became a sports structure. In 1949, the basketball section merged and came under the control of the Stade Reims but, for lack of funds, the activity stopped immediately and the club closed. Today the high-level basketball is still present in Reims through Champagne Châlons Reims Basket.

== Honours ==
French League

- Winners (2): 1931-32, 1932–33
