= Nationale Masculine 1 =

Nationale Masculine 1 (NM1)
- Founded: 1949; 77 years ago
- First season: 1949–50
- Country: France
- Confederation: FIBA Europe
- Number of teams: 18
- Level on pyramid: Level 3
- Promotion to: Élite 2
- Relegation to: NM2
- Current champions: Metropolitans 92 (1st title)

The Nationale Masculine 1, abbreviated as NM1, (English: National Male 1), is the professional level third-tier division of men's club basketball in France. The two top teams from each season of the competition are promoted to the Élite 2, which is the French second division. The competition is organized by the French Basketball Federation (FFBB).

== Seasons ==
Season	Champions	Other promoted teams
2009–10	Reims Champagne	SOM Boulonnais
2010–11	JSA Bordeaux	Saint-Etienne
2011–12	Saint-Quentin	Étoile Charleville-Mézières
2012–13	BC Orchies	Souffelweyersheim
2013–14	Monaco	Angers; Étoile Charleville-Mézières
2014–15	Saint-Chamond	JA Vichy
2015–16	Blois	AMSB
2016–17	Caen Calvados	UJAP Quimper 29
2017–18	Gries Oberhoffen	Chartres
2018–19	Souffelweyersheim	Saint-Quentin
2019–20	Cancelled due to COVID-19 pandemic	
2020–21	Cancelled due to COVID-19 pandemic	
2021–22	Angers	Stade Rochelais
2022–23	Rouen	AS Loon-Plage
2023–24	Hyères-Toulon	Caen Calvados
2024–25	Challans	Quimper
2025–26	Metropolitans 92	

== Notable players ==
- (France) (United States) Jaylen Hoard
