= LNB Élite =

Top French men's basketball league

- Organising body: LNB
- Founded: 1921; 105 years ago
- Countries: France (15 teams); Monaco (1 team)
- Confederation: FIBA Europe
- Number of teams: 16
- Relegation to: Élite 2
- Domestic cup(s): French Cup (French Federation Cup); Leaders Cup (French League Cup)
- International cup(s): EuroLeague; EuroCup; Champions League; FIBA Europe Cup
- Current champions: AS Monaco (3rd title) (2025–26)
- Most championships: ASVEL (21 titles)
- All-time top scorer: Hervé Dubuisson (19,013)
- TV partners: DAZN; La Chaîne L'Equipe; Sport en France; Fanseat (select foreign markets); NBA App
- Website: LNB Élite
- 2026–27 LNB Élite season

The LNB Élite, currently known for sponsorship reasons as Betclic Élite, is a professional basketball league in France and is the highest level of the French basketball system. The competition has existed since 1921. Since 1987, the Ligue Nationale de Basket (LNB) has governed the league.

Formerly known as the LNB Pro A, each season consists of 16 teams. The bottom two placed teams from each season are relegated to the second tier level Élite 2. The winner of the play-offs of the league are crowned the French national champions.

== Competition format ==
All 16 LNB Élite teams play each other twice during the regular season. At the end of the regular season, the top eight teams qualify for the playoffs. The two teams with the worst regular season records are relegated to the 2nd-tier Élite 2.

Through the 1985–86 season, the league championship was determined by a one-off final, or solely by league play. Since then, the format for the league finals has changed many times:

- 1987–1992: Best-of-3 series
- 1993: Best-of-5
- 1994: Best-of-3
- 1995–1996: Best-of-5
- 1997–2004: Best-of-3
- 2005–2012: Single match (at Palais Omnisports de Paris-Bercy in Paris)
- 2013–present: Best-of-5
- 2021 only: Single match due to COVID-19 issues

From the 2003–04 season, through the 2006–07 season, the Pro A League had 18 teams. Through the wild-card system, it will have 18 teams again from the 2014–15 season.

== Current teams ==
Location of teams in 2026–27 LNB Élite

| Team | Home city | Arena | Capacity |
|---|---|---|---|
| BCM Gravelines-Dunkerque | Gravelines–Dunkirk | Stade des Flandres | 2,500 |
| Boulazac | Boulazac | Le Palio | 5,200 |
| Cholet | Cholet | La Meilleraie | 5,191 |
| Chorale Roanne | Roanne | Halle André Vacheresse | 5,020 |
| Élan Béarnais | Pau–Lacq–Orthez | Palais des Sports de Pau | 7,707 |
| Élan Chalon | Chalon-sur-Saône | Le Colisée | 4,540 |
| JDA Dijon | Dijon | Palais des Sports J.M. Geoffroy | 5,000 |
| JL Bourg | Bourg-en-Bresse | Ekinox | 3,548 |
| LDLC ASVEL | Lyon–Villeurbanne | Astroballe | 5,556 |
| Le Mans Sarthe | Le Mans | Antarès | 6,023 |
| Limoges CSP | Limoges | Palais des Sports de Beaublanc | 6,506 |
| Nanterre 92 | Nanterre | Palais des Sports Maurice Thorez | 3,000 |
| Paris Basketball | Paris | Adidas Arena | 8,000 |
| Saint-Quentin | Saint-Quentin, Aisne | Palais des Sports Pierre Ratte | 3,800 |
| SIG Strasbourg | Strasbourg | Rhénus Sport | 6,200 |
| SLUC Nancy | Nancy | Palais des Sports Jean Weille | 6,027 |

== Arena rules ==
Currently, LNB Élite clubs must play in arenas that seat at least 3,000 people.

== French League history ==
- 1920–21 to 1948–49 Excellence
- 1949–50 to 1962–63 Nationale
- 1963–64 to 1964–65 Première Division
- 1965–66 to 1986–87 Nationale 1
- 1987–88 to 1991–92 Nationale 1A
- 1992–93 Nationale A1
- 1993–94 to 2017–18 Pro A
- 2017–18 to 2020–21 Jeep Élite (title sponsorship took effect in the later stages of the 2017–18 season)
- 2021–22 to present: Betclic Elite

== Title holders ==
- 1920–21: Stade Français
- 1921–22: Lille
- 1922–23: École Normale Arras
- 1923–24: FAM
- 1924–25: FAM
- 1925–26: FAM
- 1926–27: Stade Français
- 1927–28: FAM
- 1928–29: FAM
- 1929–30: FAM
- 1930–31: FAM
- 1931–32: CAUFA Reims
- 1932–33: CAUFA Reims
- 1933–34: Olympique Lillois
- 1934–35: CAM
- 1935–36: SCPO
- 1936–37: CAM
- 1937–38: SCPO
- 1938–39: Métro
- 1939–41: Not held due to WWII
- 1941–42: Métro
- 1942–43: Grenoble
- 1943–44: Grenoble
- 1944–45: Championnet Sports
- 1945–46: ESSMG Lyon
- 1946–47: PUC
- 1947–48: Union athlétique de Marseille
- 1948–49: ASVEL
- 1949–50: ASVEL
- 1950–51: Racing Club de France
- 1951–52: ASVEL
- 1952–53: Racing Club de France
- 1953–54: Racing Club de France
- 1954–55: ASVEL
- 1955–56: ASVEL
- 1956–57: ASVEL
- 1957–58: Étoile Charleville-Mézières
- 1958–59: Chorale Mulsant
- 1959–60: Étoile Charleville-Mézières
- 1960–61: Alsace de Bagnolet
- 1961–62: Alsace de Bagnolet
- 1962–63: PUC
- 1963–64: ASVEL
- 1964–65: Denain Voltaire
- 1965–66: ASVEL
- 1966–67: Alsace de Bagnolet
- 1967–68: ASVEL
- 1968–69: ASVEL
- 1969–70: Olympique Antibes
- 1970–71: ASVEL
- 1971–72: ASVEL
- 1972–73: Berck
- 1973–74: Berck
- 1974–75: ASVEL
- 1975–76: ASPO Tours
- 1976–77: ASVEL
- 1977–78: Moderne
- 1978–79: Moderne
- 1979–80: ASPO Tours
- 1980–81: ASVEL
- 1981–82: Moderne
- 1982–83: Limoges CSP
- 1983–84: Limoges CSP
- 1984–85: Limoges CSP
- 1985–86: Orthez
- 1986–87: Orthez
- 1987–88: Limoges CSP
- 1988–89: Limoges CSP
- 1989–90: Limoges CSP
- 1990–91: Olympique Antibes
- 1991–92: Pau-Orthez
- 1992–93: Limoges CSP
- 1993–94: Limoges CSP
- 1994–95: Olympique Antibes
- 1995–96: Pau-Orthez
- 1996–97: PSG Racing
- 1997–98: Pau-Orthez
- 1998–99: Pau-Orthez
- 1999–00: Limoges CSP
- 2000–01: Pau-Orthez
- 2001–02: ASVEL
- 2002–03: Pau-Orthez
- 2003–04: Pau-Orthez
- 2004–05: SIG Strasbourg
- 2005–06: Le Mans Sarthe
- 2006–07: Chorale Roanne
- 2007–08: SLUC Nancy
- 2008–09: ASVEL
- 2009–10: Cholet
- 2010–11: SLUC Nancy
- 2011–12: Élan Chalon
- 2012–13: JSF Nanterre
- 2013–14: Limoges CSP
- 2014–15: Limoges CSP
- 2015–16: ASVEL
- 2016–17: Élan Chalon
- 2017–18: Le Mans Sarthe
- 2018–19: ASVEL
- 2019–20: Cancelled due to COVID-19
- 2020–21: ASVEL
- 2021–22: ASVEL
- 2022–23: AS Monaco
- 2023–24: AS Monaco
- 2024–25: Paris Basketball
- 2025–26: AS Monaco

== Performance by club ==
| Club | Champions | Winning years |
|---|---|---|
| ASVEL | 21 | 1949–50, 1950–51, 1951–52, 1954–55, 1955–56, 1956–57, 1963–64, 1965–66, 1967–68, 1968–69, 1970–71, 1971–72, 1974–75, 1976–77, 1980–81, 2001–02, 2008–09, 2015–16, 2018–19, 2020–21, 2021–22 |
| Limoges CSP | 11 | 1982–83, 1983–84, 1984–85, 1987–88, 1988–89, 1989–90, 1992–93, 1993–94, 1999–00, 2013–14, 2014–15 |
| Pau-Lacq-Orthez | 9 | 1985–86, 1986–87, 1991–92, 1995–96, 1997–98, 1998–99, 2000–01, 2002–03, 2003–04 |
| FAM | 7 | 1923–24, 1924–25, 1925–26, 1927–28, 1928–29, 1929–30, 1930–31 |
| Le Mans Sarthe | 5 | 1977–78, 1978–79, 1981–82, 2005–06, 2017–18 |
| Racing Paris | 4 | 1950–51, 1952–53, 1953–54, 1996–97 |
| Alsace de Bagnolet | 3 | 1960–61, 1961–62, 1966–67 |
| Olympique Antibes | 3 | 1969–70, 1990–91, 1994–95 |
| AS Monaco | 3 | 2022–23, 2023–24, 2025–26 |
| Stade Français | 2 | 1920–21, 1926–27 |
| CAUFA Reims | 2 | 1931–32, 1932–33 |
| CAM | 2 | 1934–35, 1936–37 |
| SCPO | 2 | 1935–36, 1937–38 |
| Métro | 2 | 1938–39, 1941–42 |
| Grenoble | 2 | 1942–43, 1943–44 |
| Étoile Charleville-Mézières | 2 | 1957–58, 1959–60 |
| PUC | 2 | 1946–47, 1962–63 |
| Berck | 2 | 1972–73, 1973–74 |
| ASPO Tours | 2 | 1975–76, 1979–80 |
| Chorale Roanne | 2 | 1958–59, 2006–07 |
| SLUC Nancy | 2 | 2007–08, 2010–11 |
| Élan Chalon | 2 | 2011–12, 2016–17 |
| ICAM Lille | 1 | 1921–22 |
| École Normale Arras | 1 | 1922–23 |
| Olympique Lillois | 1 | 1933–34 |
| Championnet Sports | 1 | 1944–45 |
| ESSMG Lyon | 1 | 1945–46 |
| Marseille | 1 | 1947–48 |
| Denain Voltaire | 1 | 1964–65 |
| SIG | 1 | 2004–05 |
| Cholet | 1 | 2009–10 |
| Nanterre 92 | 1 | 2012–13 |
| Paris Basketball | 1 | 2024–25 |

== Finals ==
| Season | Home court advantage | Result | Home court disadvantage | 1st of Regular Season | Record |
|---|---|---|---|---|---|
| 1987–88 | Limoges CSP | 2–0 | Cholet | Limoges CSP | 26–4 |
| 1988–89 | Limoges CSP | 2–0 | Orthez | Limoges CSP | 28–2 |
| 1989–90 | Limoges CSP | 2–1 | Olympique Antibes | Limoges CSP | 33–1 |
| 1990–91 | Olympique Antibes | 2–1 | Limoges CSP | Olympique Antibes | 22–8 |
| 1991–92 | Limoges CSP | 0–2 | Pau-Orthez | Limoges CSP | 27–3 |
| 1992–93 | Limoges CSP | 3–1 | Pau-Orthez | Limoges CSP | 25–1 |
| 1993–94 | Limoges CSP | 2–0 | Olympique Antibes | Limoges CSP | 23–3 |
| 1994–95 | Olympique Antibes | 3–1 | Pau-Orthez | Olympique Antibes | 21–5 |
| 1995–96 | Pau-Orthez | 3–2 | ASVEL | Pau-Orthez | 27–3 |
| 1996–97 | ASVEL | 0–2 | PSG Racing | Pau-Orthez | 24–6 |
| 1997–98 | Pau-Orthez | 2–0 | Limoges CSP | ASVEL | 24–6 |
| 1998–99 | Pau-Orthez | 2–0 | ASVEL | Pau-Orthez | 27–3 |
| 1999–00 | ASVEL | 1–2 | Limoges CSP | ASVEL | 24–6 |
| 2000–01 | ASVEL | 0–2 | Pau-Orthez | ASVEL | 24–6 |
| 2001–02 | Pau-Orthez | 0–2 | ASVEL | Pau-Orthez | 24–6 |
| 2002–03 | Pau-Orthez | 2–1 | ASVEL | Pau-Orthez | 27–3 |
| 2003–04 | Pau-Orthez | 2–0 | BCM Gravelines | Le Mans Sarthe | 27–7 |
| 2004–05 | SIG | 1–0 (72–68) | SLUC Nancy | Le Mans Sarthe | 25–9 |
| 2005–06 | SLUC Nancy | 0–1 (88–93) | Le Mans Sarthe | Pau-Orthez | 26–8 |
| 2006–07 | SLUC Nancy | 0–1 (74–81) | Chorale Roanne | SLUC Nancy | 25–9 |
| 2007–08 | SLUC Nancy | 1–0 (84–53) | Chorale Roanne | Le Mans Sarthe | 23–7 |
| 2008–09 | ASVEL | 1–0 (55–41) | Entente Orléanaise Loiret | ASVEL | 22–8 |
| 2009–10 | Cholet | 1–0 (81–65) | Le Mans Sarthe | Cholet | 23–7 |
| 2010–11 | Cholet | 0–1 (74–76) | SLUC Nancy | Cholet | 22–8 |
| 2011–12 | Élan Chalon | 1–0 (95–76) | Le Mans Sarthe | BCM Gravelines | 27–3 |
| 2012–13 | SIG | 1–3 | JSF Nanterre | BCM Gravelines | 21–9 |
| 2013–14 | SIG | 0–3 | Limoges CSP | SIG | 20–10 |
| 2014–15 | SIG | 1–3 | Limoges CSP | SIG | 30–4 |
| 2015–16 | SIG | 2–3 | ASVEL | Monaco | 27–7 |
| 2016–17 | Élan Chalon | 3–2 | SIG | Monaco | 30–4 |
| 2017–18 | Monaco | 2–3 | Le Mans | Monaco | 25–9 |
| 2018–19 | ASVEL | 3–2 | Monaco | LDLC ASVEL | 27–7 |
| 2019–20 | Not awarded due to the COVID-19 pandemic | | | Monaco | 21–3 |
| 2020–21 | ASVEL | 87–74 | JDA Dijon | JDA Dijon | 27–7 |
| 2021–22 | ASVEL | 3–2 | Monaco | LDLC ASVEL | 26–8 |
| 2022–23 | Monaco | 3–0 | Metropolitans 92 | Monaco | 26–8 |
| 2023–24 | Monaco | 3–1 | Paris Basketball | Monaco | 29–5 |
| 2024–25 | Paris Basketball | 3–2 | Monaco | Paris Basketball | 23–7 |
| 2025–26 | Paris Basketball | 2–3 | Monaco | Monaco | 22–7 |

== Historical players ==
- (France) Alexis Ajinça
- (Australia) David Andersen
- (United States) Ron Anderson
- (France) Roger Antoine
- (United States) Eddie Basden
- (France) Nicolas Batum
- (France) Rodrigue Beaubois
- (France) Louis Bertorelle
- (France) Éric Beugnot
- (France) Jean-Paul Beugnot
- (France) Jim Bilba
- (France) Yann Bonato
- (United States) Bruce Bowen
- (United States) Michael Brooks
- (United States) Marcus Brown
- (France) André Buffière
- (France) Robert Busnel
- (France) Jacques Cachemire
- (France) Fabien Causeur
- (France) René Chocat
- (United States) Don Collins
- (France) Richard Dacoury
- (France) Nando de Colo
- (France) Jean Degros
- (France) Boris Diaw
- (France) Yakhouba Diawara
- (France) Alain Digbeu
- (Turkey) (United States) Bobby Dixon
- (France) Maxime Dorigo
- (France) Hervé Dubuisson
- (Turkey) (Georgia (country)) Zaza Enden
- (United States) Morris Finley
- (France) Laurent Foirest
- (France) Evan Fournier
- (United States) Lawrence Funderburke
- (France) Pierre Galle
- (United States) Ken Gardner
- (France) Mickaël Gelabale
- (France) Alain Gilles
- (France) Rudy Gobert
- (France) Henri Grange
- (United States) (Dominican Republic) Ricardo Greer
- (United States) Udonis Haslem
- (France) Thomas Heurtel
- (France) Edwin Jackson
- (United States) Keith Jennings
- (France) Cyril Julian
- (Turkey) İlkan Karaman
- (United States) Frank Kendrick
- (United States) Tarence Kinsey
- (France) Joffrey Lauvergne
- (United States) John Linehan
- (France) Timothé Luwawu-Cabarrot
- (France) Ian Mahinmi
- (Slovenia) Marko Milič
- (North Macedonia) (United States) Bo McCalebb
- (United States) Conrad McRae †
- (Dominican Republic) Sammy Mejia
- (France) Jérôme Moïso
- (France) Robert Monclar
- (Romania) Gheorghe Mureșan
- (France) (Hungary) François Németh
- (United States) Carl Nicks
- (France) Frank Ntilikina
- (France) Hugues Occansey
- (France) Stéphane Ostrowski
- (France) Tony Parker
- (Federal Republic of Yugoslavia) Žarko Paspalj
- (France) Johan Petro
- (France) Jean Perniceni
- (France) Jacques Perrier
- (France) Mickaël Piétrus
- (France) Florent Piétrus
- (United States) Micheal Ray Richardson
- (United States) J.R. Reid
- (France) Antoine Rigaudeau
- (France) Stéphane Risacher
- (United States) David Rivers
- (United States) Delaney Rudd
- (United States) Marc Salyers
- (Switzerland) (South Africa) Thabo Sefolosha
- (United States) Will Solomon
- (Czech Republic) Blake Schilb
- (France) Laurent Sciarra
- (France) Kevin Séraphin
- (France) Moustapha Sonko
- (France) Philip Szanyiel
- (France) Axel Toupane
- (France) Ronny Turiaf
- (Turkey) (Bosnia and Herzegovina) (Serbia) Mirsad Türkcan
- (Croatia) Roko Ukić
- (France) Frédéric Weis
- (France) Victor Wembanyama
- (France) Léo Westermann
- (United States) (Turkey) Rickie Winslow
- (United States) Michael Young

== Players with the most French League championships won ==
| Player | Club(s) | Number of Titles Won |
|---|---|---|
| Richard Dacoury | Limoges CSP (8), Racing Paris (1) | 9 |
| Alain Gilles | ASVEL | 8 |
| Frédéric Fauthoux | Pau-Lacq-Orthez | 7 |
| Didier Gadou | Pau-Lacq-Orthez | 7 |
| Henri Grange | ASVEL | 7 |
| Jean-Michel Sénégal | ASVEL (2), ASPO Tours (2), Limoges CSP (3) | 7 |
| André Buffière | Éveil Lyon (1), Marseille (1), ASVEL (4) | 6 |
| Laurent Foirest | Olympique Antibes (2), Pau-Lacq-Orthez (3), ASVEL (1) | 6 |
| Raymond Sahy | ASVEL | 6 |

== Individual awards ==
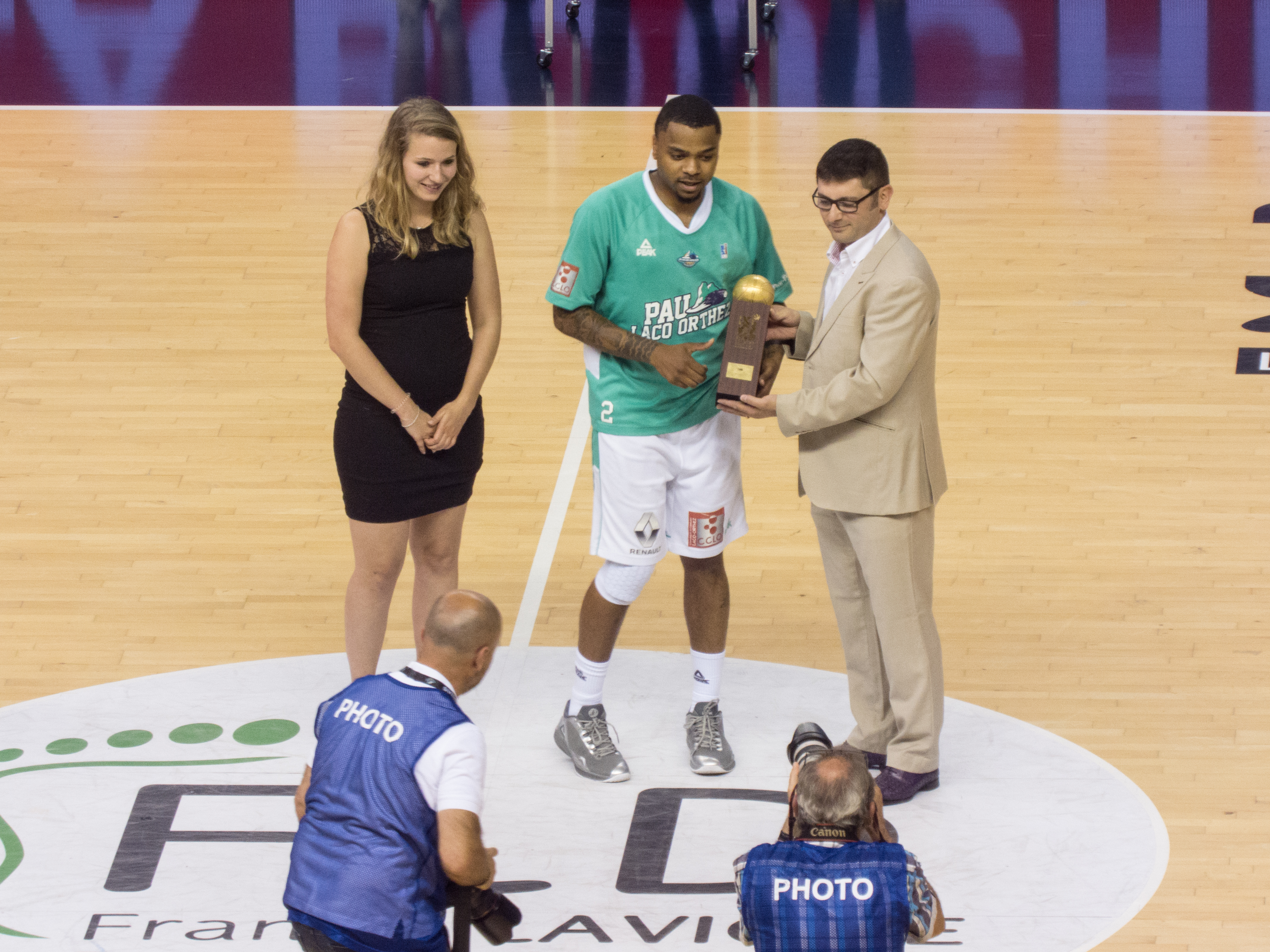
D. J. Cooper receiving the Most Valuable Player award in 2017

In each Pro A season, individual honors are given to players and head coaches in the Pro A Awards ceremony who performed well during a given season. The awards that are handed out include:

- Most Valuable Player
- Finals MVP
- Best Young Player
- Best Scorer
- Best Sixth Man
- Best Defender
- Most Improved Player
- Best Coach

== Broadcasting ==
In July 2024, the LNB announced it had signed an agreement until 2029 with DAZN which becomes the exclusive broadcaster for the Pro A. DAZN will broadcast all games, as well as the Leaders Cup and All-Star Game. The league's games are also accessible through the FIBA-operated Courtside 1891 platform.

== See also ==
- French Cup (French Federation Cup)
- Leaders Cup (French League Cup)
- Match des Champions (basketball) (French Supercup)
- LNB Pro B
- Ligue Féminine de Basketball
