= LNB Élite Awards =

Basketball awards

The LNB Élite Awards are the individual awards of the top-tier level men's professional club basketball league in France, the LNB Élite. Maxi-Basket holds the vote, and calls it the referendum. The distinction of the Coach of the Year is awarded by the Coaches' Basketball Union.

== Player of the Year awards (before 1983) ==
Before 1983, the title of the best player in the league was sometimes assigned by a panel of journalists, but the charts are incomplete.

- Jean Degros (Denain) was voted the best player of the year in the 1962–63 season.
- Alain Gilles (ASVEL) was voted the best player of the year in the 1964–65, 1966–67, and 1967–68 seasons.
- Michel Le Ray (ABC Nantes) was voted the best player of the year in the 1965–66 season.
- Pierre Galle (AS Berck) was voted the best player of the year in the 1972–73 and 1973–74 seasons.

== Awards (since 1983) ==
Between 1983 and 2005, the monthly Maxi-Basket conducted a vote of the players and head coaches of the league. Since 2005, the coaches and captains of the LNB Élite clubs, and a panel of fifty journalists are asked to vote. Since the 2014–15 LNB Pro A season, the MVP award is a single unified award. Prior to that, it was divided into two separate awards, one for French players, and one for non-French players.

Season	(France) French Domestic Player's MVP	Foreign Player's MVP	Best Young Player	Best Defender	Most Improved Player	Best Sixth Man	Best Coach
1982–83	(France) Philip Szanyiel (ASVEL)	(United States) Ed Murphy (Limoges)	(France) Valéry Demory (Stade)	Unassigned	Unassigned	Unassigned	Unassigned
1983–84	(France) Hervé Dubuisson (Stade)	(United States) Ed Murphy (Limoges)	(France) Stéphane Ostrowski (MSB)	Unassigned	Unassigned	Unassigned	Unassigned
1984–85	(France) Richard Dacoury (Limoges)	(United States) Ed Murphy (Limoges)	(France) Valéry Demory (Stade)	Unassigned	Unassigned	Unassigned	Unassigned
1985–86	(France) Stéphane Ostrowski (Limoges)	(United States) Kevin Figaro (Challans)	(France) Christian Garnier (Monaco)	(United States) Allen Bunting (Antibes)	Unassigned	Unassigned	(France) Michel Gomez (Challans)
1986–87	(France) Freddy Hufnagel (Orthez)	(United States) Bill Varner (Antibes)	(France) Didier Gadou (Orthez)	(France) Richard Dacoury (Limoges)	Unassigned	Unassigned	(United States) George Fisher (Orthez)
1987–88	(France) Stéphane Ostrowski (Limoges)	(United States) Don Collins (Limoges)	(France) Hugues Occansey (Limoges)	(France) Richard Dacoury (Limoges)	Unassigned	Unassigned	(France) Jean Galle (Cholet)
1988–89	(France) Stéphane Ostrowski (Limoges)	(United States) Don Collins (Limoges)	(France) Jim Bilba (Cholet)	(France) Richard Dacoury (Limoges)	Unassigned	Unassigned	(France) Jean-Luc Monschau (Mulhouse)
1989–90	(France) Stéphane Ostrowski (Limoges)	(United States) Don Collins (Limoges)	(France) Antoine Rigaudeau (Cholet)	(France) Richard Dacoury (Limoges)	Unassigned	Unassigned	(France) Michel Gomez (Limoges)
1990–91	(France) Antoine Rigaudeau (Cholet)	(United States) Michael Brooks (Limoges)	(France) Antoine Rigaudeau (Cholet)	(France) Richard Dacoury (Limoges)	Unassigned	Unassigned	(France) Michel Gomez (Orthez)
1991–92	(France) Antoine Rigaudeau (Cholet)	(United States) Michael Brooks (Limoges)	(France) Antoine Rigaudeau (Cholet)	(France) Richard Dacoury (Limoges)	Unassigned	Unassigned	(France) Alain Thinet (Roanne)
1992–93	(France) Antoine Rigaudeau (Cholet)	(United States) Michael Young (Limoges)	(France) Yann Bonato (Antibes)	(France) Richard Dacoury (Limoges)	Unassigned	Unassigned	(Federal Republic of Yugoslavia) Božidar Maljković (Limoges)
1993–94	(France) Antoine Rigaudeau (Cholet)	(United States) Michael Young (Limoges)	(France) Alain Digbeu (ASVEL)	(France) Richard Dacoury (Limoges)	Unassigned	Unassigned	(Federal Republic of Yugoslavia) Božidar Maljković (Limoges)
1994–95	(France) Yann Bonato (Paris)	(United States) David Rivers (Antibes)	(France) Alain Digbeu (ASVEL)	(France) Richard Dacoury (Limoges)	Unassigned	Unassigned	(France) Jacques Monclar (Antibes)
1995–96	(France) Antoine Rigaudeau (Orthez)	(United States) Delaney Rudd (ASVEL)	(France) Fabien Dubos (Orthez)	(France) Arsène Ade-Mensah (Antibes)	Unassigned	Unassigned	(France) Grégor Beugnot (ASVEL)
1996–97	(France) Yann Bonato (Limoges)	(United States) Delaney Rudd (ASVEL)	(France) Frédéric Weis (Limoges)	(France) Jim Bilba (ASVEL)	Unassigned	Unassigned	(France) Grégor Beugnot (ASVEL)
1997–98	(France) Jim Bilba (ASVEL)	(United States) Jerry McCullough (BCM)	(France) Willem Laure (Dijon)	(France) Arsène Ade-Mensah (Paris)	Unassigned	Unassigned	(France) Grégor Beugnot (ASVEL)
1998–99	(France) Laurent Foirest (Orthez)	(United States) Keith Jennings (MSB)	(France) Frédéric Weis (Limoges)	(France) Jim Bilba (ASVEL)	Unassigned	Unassigned	(France) Claude Bergeaud (Orthez)
1999–00	(France) Moustapha Sonko (ASVEL)	(United States) Marcus Brown (Limoges)	(France) David Gautier (Cholet)	(France) Jim Bilba (ASVEL)	Unassigned	Unassigned	(France) Christophe Vitoux (SIG) and (Federal Republic of Yugoslavia) Duško Ivanović (Limoges)
2000–01	(France) Jim Bilba (ASVEL)	(United States) Bill Edwards (ASVEL)	(France) Tony Parker (Paris)	(France) Jim Bilba (ASVEL)	Unassigned	Unassigned	(France) Vincent Collet (MSB)
2001–02	(France) Cyril Julian (Nancy)	(Spain) Roger Esteller (Orthez)	(France) Boris Diaw (Orthez)	(France) Florent Pietrus (Orthez)	Unassigned	Unassigned	(Federal Republic of Yugoslavia) Savo Vucević (Cholet)
2002–03	(France) Boris Diaw (Orthez)	(United States) Rico Hill (MSB)	(France) Pape-Philippe Amagou (MSB)	(France) Makan Dioumassi (Toulon)	Unassigned	Unassigned	(France) Frédéric Sarre (Orthez)
2003–04	(France) Laurent Foirest (Orthez)	(United States) Rick Hughes (SIG)	(France) Pape-Philippe Amagou (MSB)	(France) Thierry Rupert (SIG)	Unassigned	Unassigned	(France) Vincent Collet (MSB)
2004–05	(France) Laurent Sciarra (BCM)	(United States) Jermaine Guice (STB)	(France) Michael Mokongo (Chalon)	(France) Michael Mokongo (Chalon)	Unassigned	Unassigned	(France) Éric Girard (SIG)
2005–06	(France) Cyril Julian (Nancy)	(United States) Jason Rowe (Toulon)	(France) Ian Mahinmi (STB)	(United States) John Linehan (Paris) / (SIG)	Unassigned	Unassigned	(France) Frédéric Sarre (JL Bourg)
2006–07	(France) Cyril Julian (Nancy)	(United States) Dewarick Spencer (Roanne)	(France) Nicolas Batum (MSB)	(France) Marc-Antoine Pellin (Roanne)	Unassigned	Unassigned	(France) Jean-Denys Choulet (Roanne)
2007–08	(France) Nando de Colo (Cholet)	(United States) Marc Salyers (Roanne)	(France) Nicolas Batum (MSB)	(France) Dounia Issa (Vichy)	(France) Nando de Colo (Cholet)	Unassigned	(France) Christian Monschau (STB)
2008–09	(France) Alain Koffi (MSB)	(United States) Austin Nichols (Toulon)	(France) Thomas Heurtel (Orthez)	(Italy) Tony Dobbins (Orléans)	(France) Rodrigue Beaubois (Cholet)	Unassigned	(France) Philippe Hervé (Orléans)
2009–10	(France) Ali Traoré (ASVEL)	(Dominican Republic) Ricardo Greer (Nancy)	(France) Andrew Albicy (Paris)	(United States) John Linehan (Cholet)	(France) Kevin Seraphin (Cholet)	Unassigned	(France) Ruddy Nelhomme (Poitiers)
2010–11	(France) Mickaël Gelabale (ASVEL)	(Dominican Republic) Sammy Mejia (Cholet)	(France) Evan Fournier (Poitiers)	(United States) John Linehan (Nancy)	(France) Evan Fournier (Poitiers)	Unassigned	(Turkey) Erman Kunter (Cholet)
2011–12	(France) Fabien Causeur (Cholet)	(Czech Republic) Blake Schilb (Chalon)	(France) Evan Fournier (Poitiers)	(France) Andrew Albicy (BCM)	(France) Evan Fournier (Poitiers)	Unassigned	(France) Grégor Beugnot (Chalon)
2012–13	(France) Edwin Jackson (ASVEL)	(United States) Dwight Buycks (BCM)	(France) Livio Jean-Charles (ASVEL)	(Italy) Tony Dobbins (Poitiers)	(France) Edwin Jackson (ASVEL)	Unassigned	(France) Christian Monschau (BCM)
2013–14	(France) Antoine Diot (SIG)	(United States) Randal Falker (Nancy)	(Switzerland) Clint Capela (Chalon)	(Italy) Tony Dobbins (Dijon)	(Switzerland) Clint Capela (Chalon)	Unassigned	(France) Jean-Louis Borg (Dijon)
2014–15	(France) Adrien Moerman (Limoges)		(France) Petr Cornelie (Le Mans)	(France) Florent Piétrus (Nancy)	(France) Benjamin Sene (Nancy)	(United States) Jamar Smith (Limoges) and (United States) Darnell Harris (Orleans)	(France) Vincent Collet (SIG)
2015–16	(United States) Devin Booker (Chalon)		(France) Frank Ntilikina (SIG)	(France) Charles Kahudi (ASVEL)	(France) Wilfried Yeguete (Orthez)	(United States) Matt Howard (SIG) and (France) Mathias Lessort (Chalon)	(France) Vincent Collet (SIG)
2016–17	(United States) D.J. Cooper (Orthez)		(France) Frank Ntilikina (SIG)	(France) Moustapha Fall (Chalon)	(France) Paul Lacombe (SIG)	(France) Louis Labeyrie (Paris-Levallois)	(Montenegro) Zvezdan Mitrović (Monaco)

== L'Équipe awards (1994–2005) ==
Between 1994 and 2005, the French newspaper, L'Équipe, also conducted a selection of the best French and foreign players of the league, through a vote of journalists. These awards are also considered official by the Ligue Nationale de Basket (LNB).

Season	(France) French Domestic Player's MVP	Foreign Player's MVP
1993–94	(France) Antoine Rigaudeau (Cholet)	(United States) Michael Young (Limoges)
1994–95	(France) Yann Bonato (Paris)	(United States) David Rivers (Antibes)
1995–96	(France) Antoine Rigaudeau (Orthez)	(United States) Delaney Rudd (ASVEL)
1996–97	(France) Jim Bilba (ASVEL)	(United States) Delaney Rudd (ASVEL)
1997–98	(France) Alain Digbeu (ASVEL)	(United States) Jerry McCullough (BCM)
1998–99	(France) Laurent Foirest (Orthez)	(United States) Keith Jennings (MSB)
1999–00	(France) Moustapha Sonko (ASVEL)	(United States) Marcus Brown (Limoges)
2000–01	(France) Jim Bilba (ASVEL)	(United States) Bill Edwards (ASVEL)
2001–02	(France) Cyril Julian (Nancy)	(United States) - (United Kingdom) Tony Dorsey (Cholet)
2002–03	(France) Laurent Sciarra (Paris)	(Federal Republic of Yugoslavia) Dragan Lukovski (Orthez)
2003–04	(France) Laurent Foirest (Orthez)	(United States) Rick Hughes (SIG)
2004–05	(France) Laurent Sciarra (BCM)	(United States) Jermaine Guice (STB)
