= LNB Pro A Best Scorer =

French basketball award

The LNB Pro A Best Scorer, or Top Scorer, is the best scorer of the season award, of the top-tier level men's professional club basketball league in France, the LNB Pro A. In basketball, points are the sum of the score accumulated through free throws or field goals. The LNB Pro A's scoring title is awarded to the player with the highest points per game average in a given regular season. Before the 1976–77 season, the league's Top Scorer was the player who scored the most total points in the league during the season. Since the 1976–77 season, the league's Top Scorer is the player with the highest scoring average per game during the season.

== Best scorers by total points scored (1949–50 to 1975–76) ==
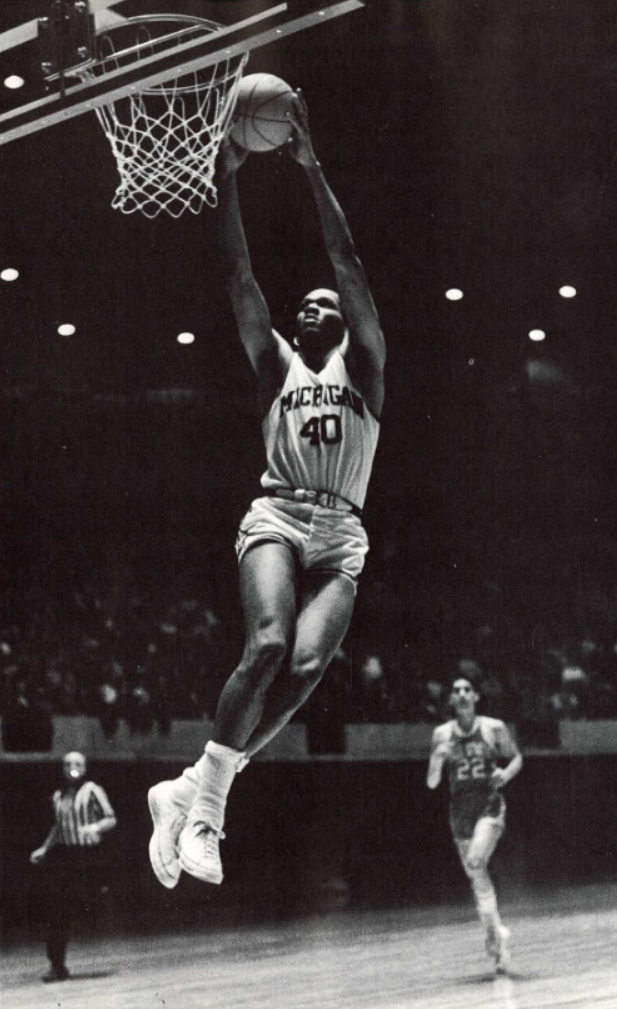
Dennis Stewart was the French League's Best Scorer in 1974.

Top Scorers By Total Points Scored (1949–50 to 1975–76)
Season	Player (League's Top Scorer)	Club	Points Per Game
1949–50	(Hungary) - (France) François Németh	ASVEL Basket	22.9
1950–51	(Hungary) - (France) François Németh (2×)	Paris Basket Racing	24.4
1951–52	(France) Henri Théron	AS Montferrand Basket	20.6
1952–53	(France) Jacques Dessemme	EV Bellegarde	24.2
1953–54	(France) Roger Haudegand	RCS Marly	28.4
1954–55	(France) Roger Haudegand (2×)	RCS Marly	24.9
1955–56	(France) Roger Haudegand (3×)	RCS Marly	29.8
1956–57	(France) Roger Haudegand (4×)	RCS Marly	29.7
1957–58	(France) Roger Haudegand (5×)	RCS Marly	22.7
1958–59	(France) Robert Monclar	Paris Basket Racing	22.7
1959–60	(France) Roger Haudegand (6×)	RCS Marly	25.7
1960–61	(France) Roger Haudegand (7×)	RCS Valenciennes	27.9
1961–62	(France) Jean Degros	Denain Basket	22.8
1962–63	(France) Jean-Paul Beugnot	Charleville	27.3
1963–64	(France) Michel Le Ray	ABC Nantes	21.3
1964–65	(France) Michel Le Ray (2×)	ABC Nantes	21.2
1965–66	(France) Jean-Pierre Staelens	Denain Basket	28.1
1966–67	(France) Jean-Pierre Staelens (2×)	Denain Basket	28.9
1967–68	(France) Jean-Pierre Staelens (3×)	Denain Basket	26.6
1968–69	(United States) Willie Davis	CSE Toulous	29.8
1969–70	(United States) Rudy Bennett	JA Vichy	30.8
1970–71	(United States) Larry Robertson	Nice ASPTT Basket	32.5
1971–72	(United States) L.C. Bowen	ASPO Tours	34.0
1972–73	(United States) Bob Thate	SS Nilvange	39.0
1973–74	(United States) Dennis Stewart	JA Vichy	33.5
1974–75	(France) Jacques Cachemire	Olympique Antibes	29.1
1975–76	(United States) L.C. Bowen (2×)	ASPO Tours	30.7

== Best scorers by points per game (1976–77 to present) ==
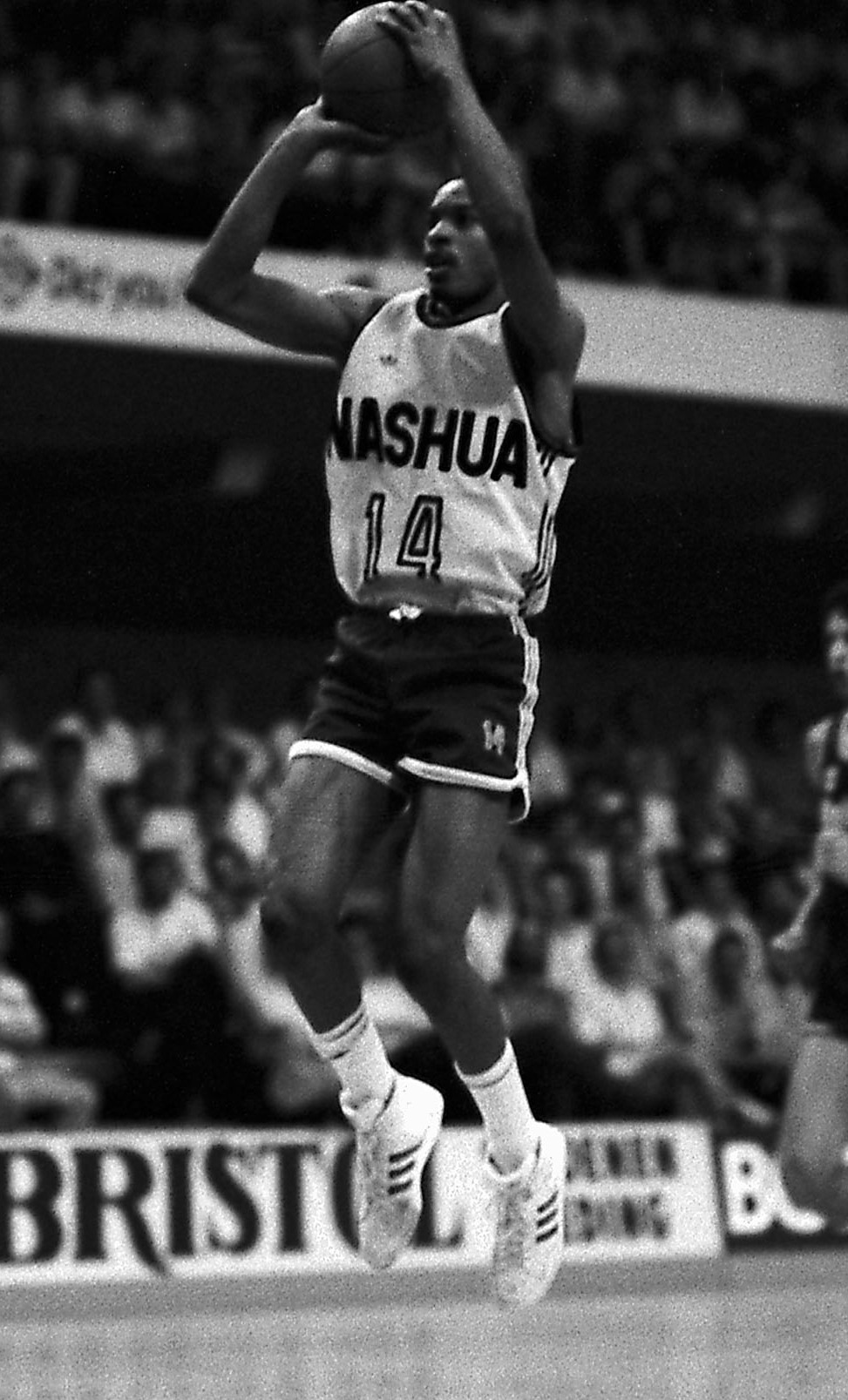
Terence Stansbury was the French League's Best Scorer in 1993.

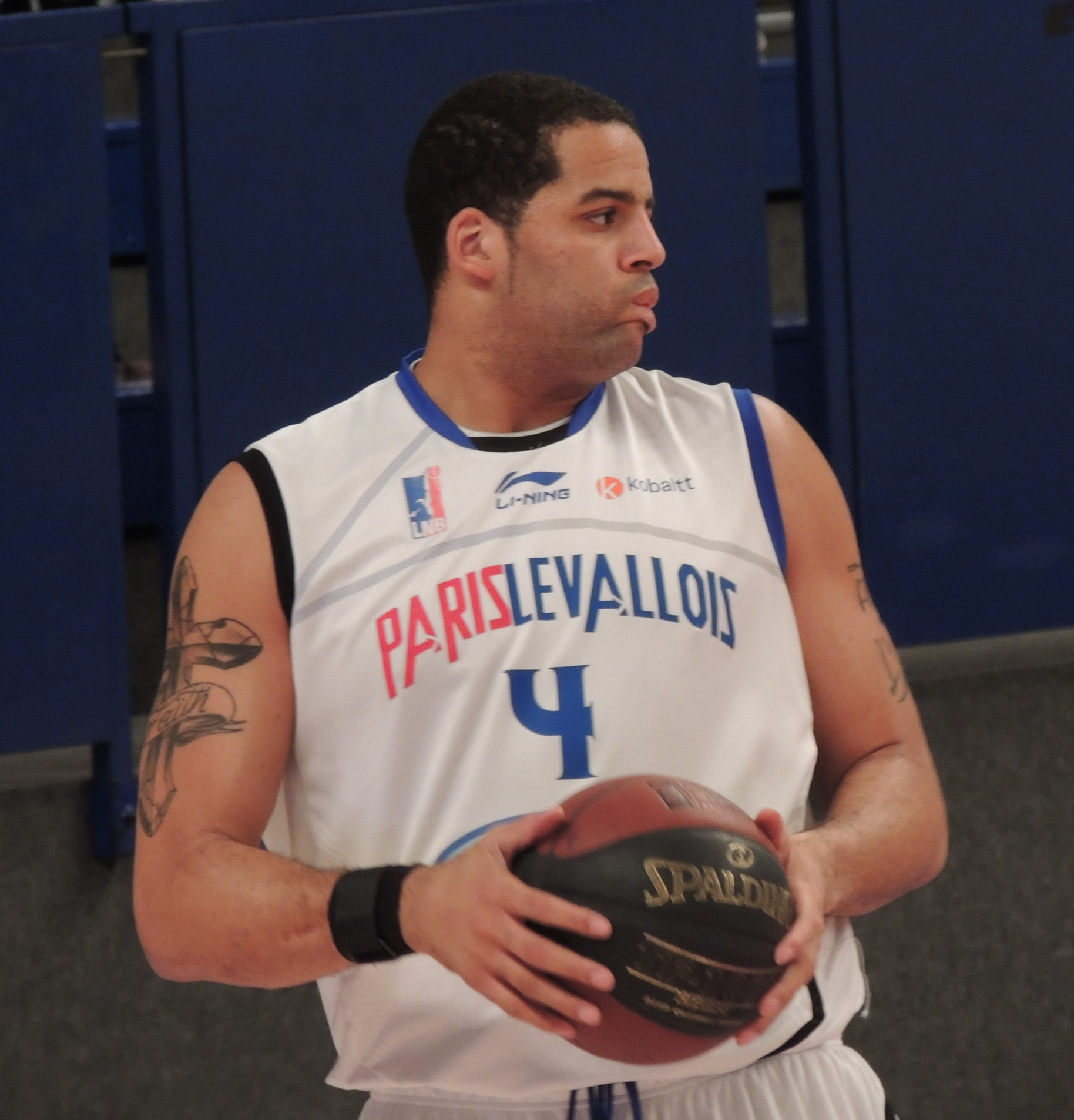
Sean May was the French League's Best Scorer in 2013.

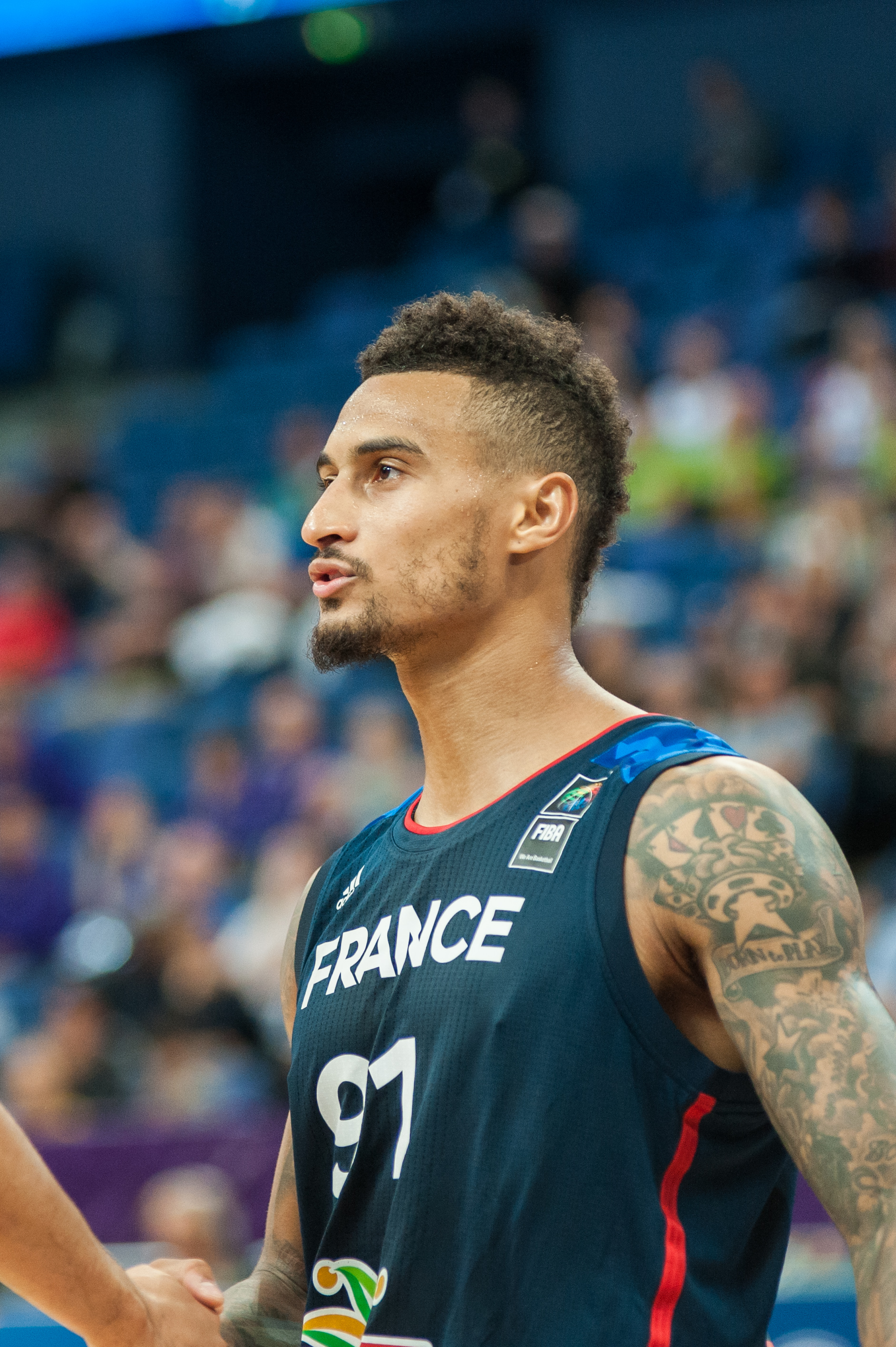
Edwin Jackson was the French League's Best Scorer in 2014.

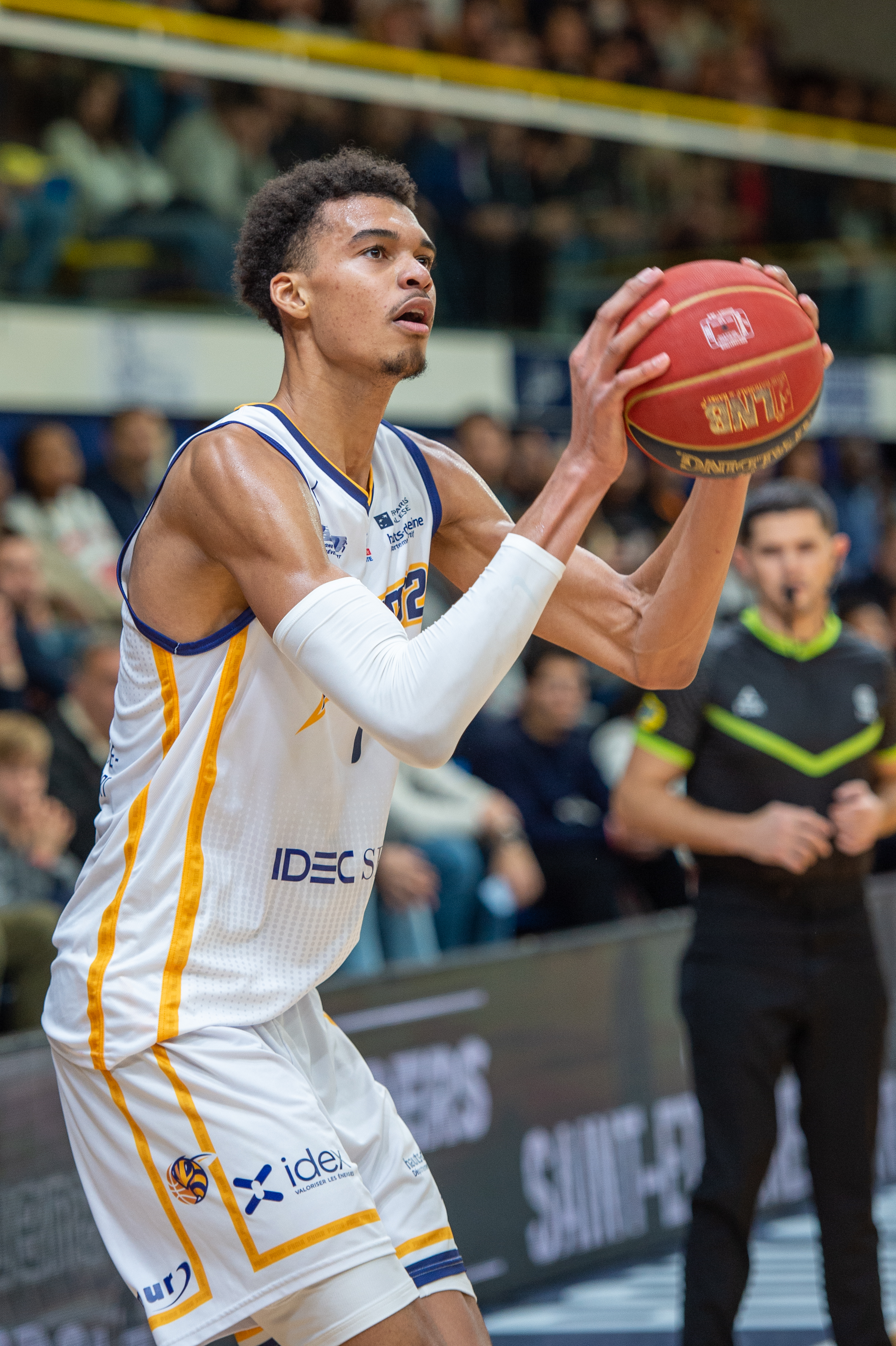
Victor Wembanyama led the league in scoring at age 19, in 2023.

Top Scorers By Points Per Game (1976–77 to present)
Season	Player (League's Top Scorer)	Club	Points Per Game
1976–77	(United States) John Dearman	AS Tarare Basket	32.7
1977–78	(United States) Bob Wymbs	Denain Basket	32.4
1978–79	(United States) John Garrett	ES Avignon Basket	30.1
1979–80	(United States) Floyd Allen	Basket CRO Lyon	32.1
1980–81	(United States) - (France) Paul Henderson	Élan Béarnais Orthez	27.2
1981–82	(United States) Ed Murphy	Limoges CSP	29.8
1982–83	(United States) Ed Murphy (2×)	Limoges CSP	31.7
1983–84	(United States) Ed Murphy (3×)	Limoges CSP	32.3
1984–85	(United States) Ed Murphy (4×)	Limoges CSP	34.1
1985–86	(United States) Keith Edmonson	Caen Basket Calvados	35.3
1986–87	(United States) Joe Dawson	FC Mulhouse Basket	35.3
1987–88	(United States) - (France) Ron Davis	FC Mulhouse Basket	30.2
1988–89	(United States) - (France) Ron Davis (2×)	FC Mulhouse Basket	31.1
1989–90	(United States) Derrick Rowland	Caen Basket Calvados	26.3
1990–91	(United States) Bill Jones	Montpellier Paillade Basket	26.5
1991–92	(United States) Bill Jones (2×)	Montpellier Paillade Basket	24.8
1992–93	(United States) Terence Stansbury	Levallois SC Basket	26.3
1993–94	(United States) Skeeter Henry	JDA Dijon Basket	24.2
1994–95	(United States) Ron Anderson	Montpellier Paillade Basket	25.5
1995–96	(United States) Todd Mitchell	Montpellier Paillade Basket	24.7
1996–97	(United States) David Booth	JDA Dijon Basket	22.5
1997–98	(United States) Jerry McCullough	BCM Gravelines	20.3
1998–99	(United States) Keith Jennings	Le Mans Sarthe Basket	19.4
1999–00	(United States) John White	SIG Strasbourg	19.6
2000–01	(United States) Curtis McCants	Montpellier Paillade Basket	21.7
2001–02	(United Kingdom) - (United States) Tony Dorsey	Cholet Basket	20.0
2002–03	(United States) Aubrey Reese	Chorale Roanne Basket	19.9
2003–04	(United States) Rick Hughes	SIG Strasbourg	24.1
2004–05	(Canada) Rowan Barrett	JDA Dijon Basket	21.5
2005–06	(United States) Jason Rowe	HTV Basket	21.0
2006–07	(United States) Dewarick Spencer	Chorale Roanne Basket	20.6
2007–08	(United States) Sean Colson	HTV Basket	21.4
2008–09	(United States) Austin Nichols	HTV Basket	18.4
2009–10	(Nigeria) - (United States) Derrick Obasohan	HTV Basket	19.8
2010–11	(United States) Rick Hughes (2×)	HTV Basket	19.1
2011–12	(United States) Eric Chatfield	Paris-Levallois Basket	19.8
2012–13	(United States) Sean May	Paris-Levallois Basket	18.4
2013–14	(France) Edwin Jackson	ASVEL Basket	18.2
2014–15	(United States) Steven Gray	JDA Dijon Basket	16.8
2015–16	(United States) Michael Thompson	Pau-Lacq-Orthez	17.8
2016–17	(United States) Cameron Clark	Élan Chalon	18.6
2017–18	(United States) Zachery Peacock	JL Bourg	19.3
2018–19	(United States) Devin Ebanks	Châlons-Reims	18.8
2019-20	(Bosnia and Herzegovina) Miralem Halilović	Orléans Loiret Basket	17.6
2020-21	(Serbia) Danilo Anđušić	AS Monaco Basket	20.0
2021-22	(United States) Brandon Jefferson	Élan Béarnais	18.2
2022–23	(France) Victor Wembanyama	Metropolitans 92	21.6
2023–24	(North Macedonia) T. J. Shorts	Paris Basketball	16.3
2024–25	(France) Nadir Hifi	Paris Basketball	18.2
2025–26	(France) Nadir Hifi	Paris Basketball	20.4

== Players with most top-scorer awards ==
Player	Awards	Editions
(France) Roger Haudegand	7	1954–1958, 1960, 1961
(United States) Ed Murphy	4	1982–1985
(France) Jean-Pierre Staelens	3	1966–1968
(France) Nadir Hifi	2	2025, 2026
(United States) Rick Hughes	2	2004, 2011
(United States) Bill Jones	2	1991, 1992
(United States) L.C. Bowen	2	1972, 1976
(Hungary) (France) François Németh	2	1950, 1951
(United States) (France) Ron Davis	2	1988, 1989
(France) Michel Le Ray	2	1964, 1965

== French Basketball Championship all-time scoring leaders ==
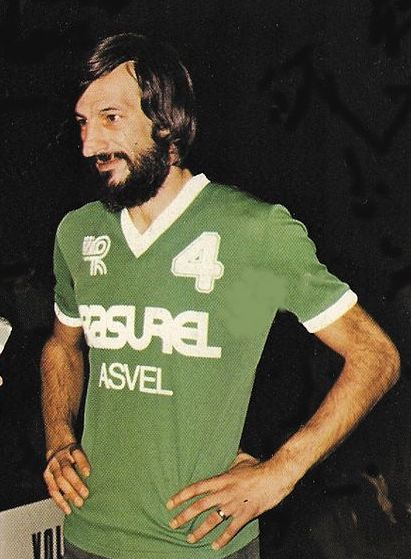
Alain Gilles is the 2nd all-time leading scorer of the top-tier level French Basketball Championship.

The all-time leaders in total points scored in the top-tier level French Basketball Championship division, including all of the league's formats.

Rank	Player	Total Points Scored
1.	(France) Hervé Dubuisson	19,013
2.	(France) Alain Gilles	18,502
3.	(France) Stéphane Ostrowski	17,764
4.	(France) Jean-Claude Bonato	15,248
5.	(France) Jacques Cachemire	14,955
6.	(France) Richard Dacoury	14,604
7.	(France) Éric Beugnot	14,006
8.	(France) Jean-Michel Sénégal	13,143
9.	(France) Jean-Pierre Staelens	12,524
10.	(France) - (United States) Bill Cain	12,411
11.	(France) Didier Dobbels	12,147
12.	(France) Laurent Dorigo	12,020
13.	(United States) - (France) Willie Redden	12,018
14.	(France) Didier Gadou	11,644
15.	(France) Jacques Monclar	11,578
16.	(France) Philippe Szanyiel	11,521
17.	(France) Daniel Haquet	11,325
18.	(United States) - (France) Paul Henderson	10,741
19.	(France) Valéry Demory	10,648
20.	(France) Jim Bilba	10,479

== 50+ point single games ==
French 1st Division games in which a player has scored 50 or more points.

50+ Point Single Games
Rank	Points Scored	Player	Team	Game Score	Opponent	Date
1	71	(France) Jean-Pierre Staelens	Denain	125–75	Valenciennes	4 March 1967
2	64	(Socialist Federal Republic of Yugoslavia) - (France) Marko Ostarčević	Racing CF	126–99	Graffenstaden	21 March 1971
3	63	(United States) Bob Thate	Nilvange	106–119	Antibes	13 January 1973
4	62	(France) Roger Haudegand	Marly	89–54	Tours	24 February 1957
4	62	(United States) L.C. Bowen	Tours	154–107	Jœuf	20 March 1976
6	61	(France) Jean-Pierre Staelens	Denain	144–69	Franconville	13 February 1966
6	61	(United States) - (France) Ron Davis	Mulhouse	109–110	Racing CF	29 October 1988
8	60	(United States) L.C. Bowen	Tours	123–92	Nantes	25 March 1972
8	60	(United States) Paul Thompson	Limoges	131–91	Mulhouse	13 December 1986
10	58	(France) Roger Haudegand	Marly	93–57	Nilvange	21 February 1954
11	57	(France) Daniel Ledent	Roanne	87–85	ASVEL	7 February 1970
11	57	(United States) L.C. Bowen	Tours	120–84	Asnières	11 December 1971
11	57	(United States) Albert Irving	Saint-Étienne	137–107	Lorient	14 December 1985
14	55	(Hungary) - (France) François Németh	Racing CF	82–55	Hirondelles Coutures	11 February 1951
14	55	(United States) Albert Irving	Saint-Étienne	125–119	Étoile Voiron	7 December 1985
14	55	(United States) Olivier Lee	Saint-Étienne	107–120	Racing CF	21 February 1987
14	55	(France) Hervé Dubuisson	Racing CF	120–93	Tours	4 March 1989
18	54	(United States) L.C. Bowen	Tours	113–91	Nancy	16 February 1974
18	54	(United States) Billy Knight	Limoges	128–94	Stade Français	5 October 1985
18	54	(United States) - (Belgium) Bill Varner	Antibes	102–72	ASVEL	13 December 1986
18	54	(United States) Brook Steppe	Racing CF	123–101	Mulhouse	10 October 1987
22	53	(France) Jean-Pierre Staelens	Denain	109–97	Le Mans	28 April 1968
22	53	(United States) Bob Thate	Nilvange	93–101	Denain	7 October 1972
22	53	(United States) Bob Thate	Nilvange	88–90	Nancy	3 March 1973
22	53	(United States) Bob Thate	Nilvange	124–96	Paris UC	7 April 1973
22	53	(France) Hervé Dubuisson	Le Mans	105–85	Lyon	29 October 1979
22	53	(United States) Floyd Allen	Lyon	103–92	Tours	1 December 1979
22	53	(United States) Ed Murphy	Limoges	110–93	Avignon	17 November 1984
22	53	(United States) Bruce King	Antibes	115–78	Caen	5 October 1985
22	53	(France) Hervé Dubuisson	Racing CF	125–113	Saint-Étienne	13 December 1986
22	53	(United States) - (Belgium) Bill Varner	Gravelines	126–125	Limoges	27 September 1988
32	52	(United States) Loyd King	Le Mans	110–94	Bagnolet	4 May 1974
32	52	(United States) Loyd King	Le Mans	116–92	Denain	19 December 1974
32	52	(United States) John Engles	Monaco	98–109	Pau-Orthez	15 October 1977
32	52	(United States) Ed Murphy	Limoges	94–101	Stade Français	8 October 1983
36	51	(France) Henri Théron	Montferrand	90–87	Auboué	28 December 1958
36	51	(United States) Willie Davis	RCM Toulouse	83–90	Alsace Bagnolet	10 December 1967
36	51	(United States) Bill Lindsey	Pau-Orthez	119–98	Denain	21 January 1978
36	51	(United States) Bob Wymbs	Denain	102–119	Le Mans	28 January 1978
36	51	(United States) Bob Wymbs	Denain	133–116	Racing CF	3 March 1978
36	51	(France) Freddy Hufnagel	Pau-Orthez	125–101	Reims	14 November 1987
36	51	(France) Hervé Dubuisson	Racing CF	89–77	Nantes	5 December 1987
43	50	(United States) Carmine Calzonetti	Nantes	88–78	Asnières	18 December 1971
43	50	(United States) Bob Wymbs	Denain	100–107	Caen	7 January 1978
43	50	(United States) Ed Murphy	Limoges	120–96	Stade Français	13 March 1982
43	50	(United States) Terry Stotts	Étoile Voiron	114–100	Grenoble	16 October 1985
43	50	(United States) Keith Edmonson	Caen	102–113	Grenoble	22 March 1986
43	50	(France) Hervé Dubuisson	Racing CF	120–107	Saint-Étienne	21 February 1987
43	50	(United States) Graylin Warner	Cholet	72–67	Lorient	19 December 1987
43	50	(United States) Graylin Warner	Cholet	114–55	Avignon	11 March 1989
43	50	(United States) Steve Burtt Sr.	Gravelines	123–121	Antibes	25 March 1989

- The record for the most points ever scored in a single game in the French 2nd Division is 101 points. That record was achieved by Jim Signorile of Stade Clermontois, who scored 101 points on 5 February 1972, in a 141–68 victory against Agen.
