= LNB Élite MVP =

Award for most valuable player in France's top men's basketball league

LNB Élite Most Valuable Player Award
- Sport: Basketball
- League: LNB Élite
- Awarded for: Best performing player in the season of the LNB Élite

History
- Most wins: Two players (1)
- Most recent: Élie Okobo, AS Monaco (2025–26)

The LNB Élite Most Valuable Player Award is the most valuable player award of the top-tier level men's professional club basketball league in France, the LNB Élite. Maxi-Basket holds the vote, and calls it the referendum.

The record for most MVP awards is hold by Antoine Rigaudeau who won five awards. Victor Wembanyama is the youngest player to ever win the award, as he won it at age 19, in 2023.

== Player of the Year awards (before 1983) ==
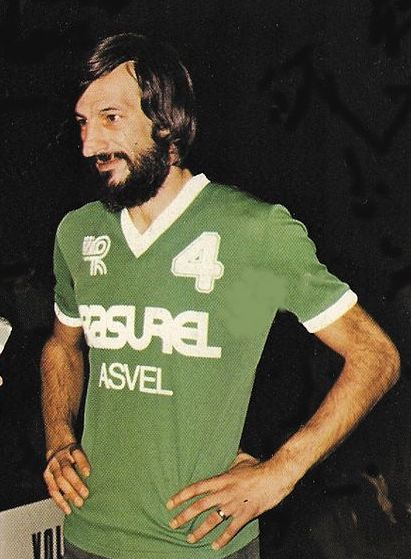
Alain Gilles was a 3 time Player of the Year (1965, 1967, 1968).

Before 1983, the title of the best player in the league was sometimes assigned by a panel of journalists, but the charts are incomplete.

- Jean Degros (Denain) was voted the best player of the year in the 1962–63 season.
- Alain Gilles (ASVEL) was voted the best player of the year in the 1964–65, 1966–67, and 1967–68 seasons.
- Michel Le Ray (ABC Nantes) was voted the best player of the year in the 1965–66 season.
- Pierre Galle (AS Berck) was voted the best player of the year in the 1972–73 and 1973–74 seasons.

== Two awards (1983–2014) ==
Between 1983 and 2005, the monthly Maxi-Basket conducted a vote of the players and head coaches of the league. Since 2005, the coaches and captains of the LNB Pro A clubs, and a panel of fifty journalists are asked to vote.

Since the 2014–15 LNB Pro A season, the MVP award is a single unified award. Prior to that, it was divided into two separate awards, one for French players, and one for non-French players.

Season	(France) French Domestic Player's MVP	Foreign Player's MVP
1982–83	(France) Philippe Szanyiel (ASVEL)	(United States) Ed Murphy (Limoges)
1983–84	(France) Hervé Dubuisson (Stade)	(United States) Ed Murphy (Limoges)
1984–85	(France) Richard Dacoury (Limoges)	(United States) Ed Murphy (Limoges)
1985–86	(France) Stéphane Ostrowski (Limoges)	(United States) Kevin Figaro (Challans)
1986–87	(France) Freddy Hufnagel (Orthez)	(United States) Bill Varner (Antibes)
1987–88	(France) Stéphane Ostrowski (Limoges)	(United States) Don Collins (Limoges)
1988–89	(France) Stéphane Ostrowski (Limoges)	(United States) Don Collins (Limoges)
1989–90	(France) Stéphane Ostrowski (Limoges)	(United States) Don Collins (Limoges)
1990–91	(France) Antoine Rigaudeau (Cholet)	(United States) Michael Brooks (Limoges)
1991–92	(France) Antoine Rigaudeau (Cholet)	(United States) Michael Brooks (Limoges)
1992–93	(France) Antoine Rigaudeau (Cholet)	(United States) Michael Young (Limoges)
1993–94	(France) Antoine Rigaudeau (Cholet)	(United States) Michael Young (Limoges)
1994–95	(France) Yann Bonato (Paris)	(United States) David Rivers (Antibes)
1995–96	(France) Antoine Rigaudeau (Orthez)	(United States) Delaney Rudd (ASVEL)
1996–97	(France) Yann Bonato (Limoges)	(United States) Delaney Rudd (ASVEL)
1997–98	(France) Jim Bilba (ASVEL)	(United States) Jerry McCullough (BCM)
1998–99	(France) Laurent Foirest (Orthez)	(United States) Keith Jennings (MSB)
1999–00	(France) Moustapha Sonko (ASVEL)	(United States) Marcus Brown (Limoges)
2000–01	(France) Jim Bilba (ASVEL)	(United States) Bill Edwards (ASVEL)
2001–02	(France) Cyril Julian (Nancy)	(Spain) Roger Esteller (Orthez)
2002–03	(France) Boris Diaw (Orthez)	(United States) Rico Hill (MSB)
2003–04	(France) Laurent Foirest (Orthez)	(United States) Rick Hughes (SIG)
2004–05	(France) Laurent Sciarra (BCM)	(United States) Jermaine Guice (STB)
2005–06	(France) Cyril Julian (Nancy)	(United States) Jason Rowe (Toulon)
2006–07	(France) Cyril Julian (Nancy)	(United States) Dewarick Spencer (Roanne)
2007–08	(France) Nando de Colo (Cholet)	(United States) Marc Salyers (Roanne)
2008–09	(France) Alain Koffi (MSB)	(United States) Austin Nichols (Toulon)
2009–10	(France) Ali Traoré (ASVEL)	(Dominican Republic) Ricardo Greer (Nancy)
2010–11	(France) Mickaël Gelabale (ASVEL)	(Dominican Republic) Sammy Mejia (Cholet)
2011–12	(France) Fabien Causeur (Cholet)	(Czech Republic) Blake Schilb (Chalon)
2012–13	(France) Edwin Jackson (ASVEL)	(United States) Dwight Buycks (BCM)
2013–14	(France) Antoine Diot (SIG)	(United States) Randal Falker (Nancy)

== LNB Pro A Unified MVP award (2015–present) ==
Since from the 2015–16 season, no differentiation was made between French and foreign players, and one award was given for the best player of the league.

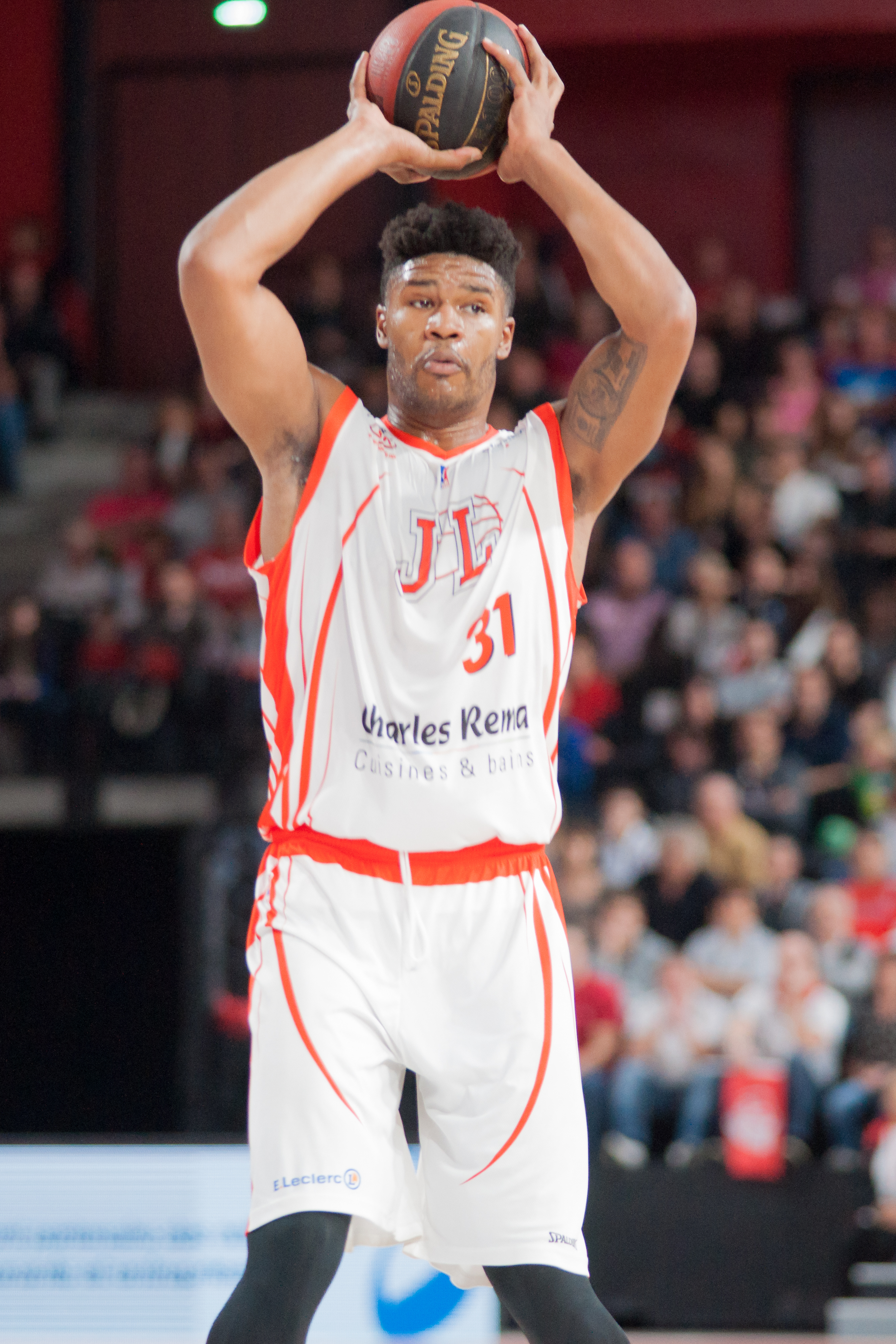
Devin Booker was the second Chalon player to win MVP, in 2016.

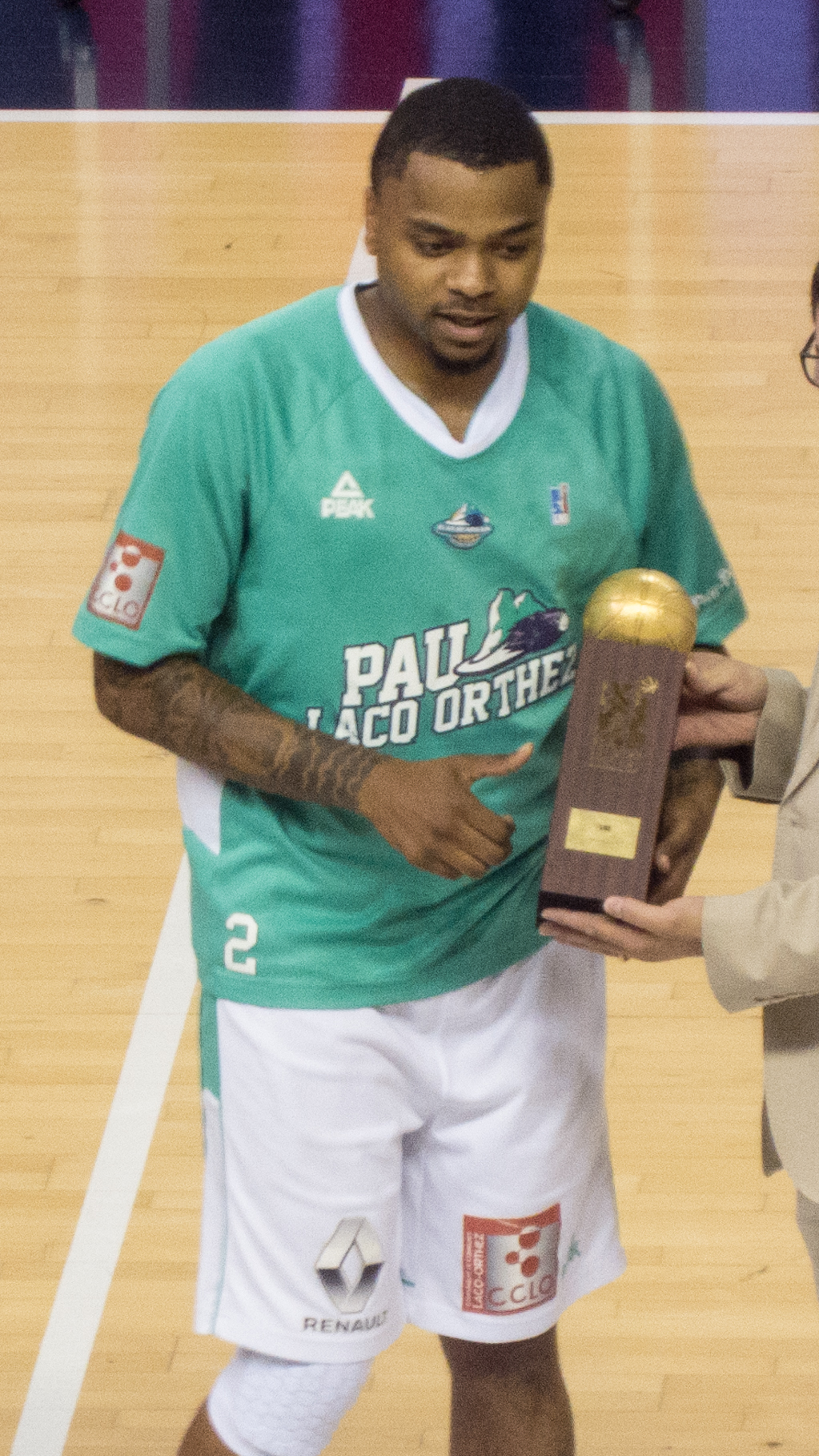
D. J. Cooper holding the MVP award trophy in 2017.

^	Denotes player who is still active in the Pro A
*	Inducted into the FIBA Hall of Fame
†	Denotes player whose team won championship that year
Player (X)	Denotes the number of times the player has been named MVP
Team (X)	Denotes the number of times a player from this team has won

Season	Player	Position	Nationality	Club	Ref(s)
2014–15†	Adrien Moerman	PF	France	Limoges CSP (18)	
2015–16	Devin Booker	C/PF	United States	Élan Chalon (2)	
2016–17	D. J. Cooper	PG	United States	Élan Béarnais Pau-Orthez	
2017–18	Zachery Peacock	C/PF	United States	JL Bourg	
2018–19	David Holston	PG	United States	JDA Dijon	
2019–20	Not awarded ^{1}				
2020–21	Bonzie Colson	SF/PF	United States	SIG Strasbourg	
2021–22	Will Cummings	PG	United States	Metropolitans 92	
2022–23	Victor Wembanyama	F/C	France	Metropolitans 92 (2)	
2023–24	T. J. Shorts	PG	United States	Paris Basketball	
2024–25	T. J. Shorts (2)	PG	United States	Paris Basketball	
2025–26	Élie Okobo	SG	France	AS Monaco	

Notes:

^1 There was no awarding in the 2019–20, because the season was cancelled due to the coronavirus pandemic in Europe.

== L'Équipe awards (1994–2005) ==
Between 1994 and 2005, the French newspaper, L'Équipe, also conducted a selection of the best French and foreign players of the league, through a vote of journalists. These awards are also considered official by the Ligue Nationale de Basket (LNB).

Season	(France) French Domestic Player's MVP	Foreign Player's MVP
1993–94	(France) Antoine Rigaudeau (Cholet)	(United States) Michael Young (Limoges)
1994–95	(France) Yann Bonato (Paris)	(United States) David Rivers (Antibes)
1995–96	(France) Antoine Rigaudeau (Orthez)	(United States) Delaney Rudd (ASVEL)
1996–97	(France) Jim Bilba (ASVEL)	(United States) Delaney Rudd (ASVEL)
1997–98	(France) Alain Digbeu (ASVEL)	(United States) Jerry McCullough (BCM)
1998–99	(France) Laurent Foirest (Orthez)	(United States) Keith Jennings (MSB)
1999–00	(France) Moustapha Sonko (ASVEL)	(United States) Marcus Brown (Limoges)
2000–01	(France) Jim Bilba (ASVEL)	(United States) Bill Edwards (ASVEL)
2001–02	(France) Cyril Julian (Nancy)	(United States) - (United Kingdom) Tony Dorsey (Cholet)
2002–03	(France) Laurent Sciarra (Paris)	(Federal Republic of Yugoslavia) Dragan Lukovski (Orthez)
2003–04	(France) Laurent Foirest (Orthez)	(United States) Rick Hughes (SIG)
2004–05	(France) Laurent Sciarra (BCM)	(United States) Jermaine Guice (STB)

== Players with the most French MVPs won by year ==
- French Player's MVP and L'Équipe MVP awards combined. When the player won both awards in the same year, it is counted as a single MVP for the year.

Player	Club(s)	Number of MVPs	Years Won
(France) Antoine Rigaudeau	Cholet (4), Pau-Orthez (1)	5	1991, 1992, 1993, 1994, 1996
(France) Stéphane Ostrowski	Limoges	4	1986, 1988, 1989, 1990
(France) Cyril Julian	Nancy	3	2002, 2006, 2007
(France) Jim Bilba	ASVEL	3	1997, 1998, 2001
(France) Yann Bonato	Paris, Limoges	2	1995, 1997
(France) Laurent Foirest	Pau-Orthez	2	1999, 2004
(France) Laurent Sciarra	Paris, Gravelines	2	2003, 2005

== Players with the most Foreign MVPs won by year ==
- Foreign Player's MVP and L'Équipe MVP awards combined. When the player won both awards in the same year, it is counted as a single MVP for the year.

Player	Club(s)	Number of MVPs	Years Won
(United States) Don Collins	Limoges	3	1988, 1989, 1990
(United States) Ed Murphy	Limoges	3	1983, 1984, 1985
(United States) Michael Brooks	Limoges	2	1991, 1992
(United States) Delaney Rudd	ASVEL	2	1996, 1997
(United States) Michael Young	Limoges	2	1993, 1994

== See also ==
- LNB Pro A Finals MVP
- LNB Pro A Awards
