= Alain Gilles =

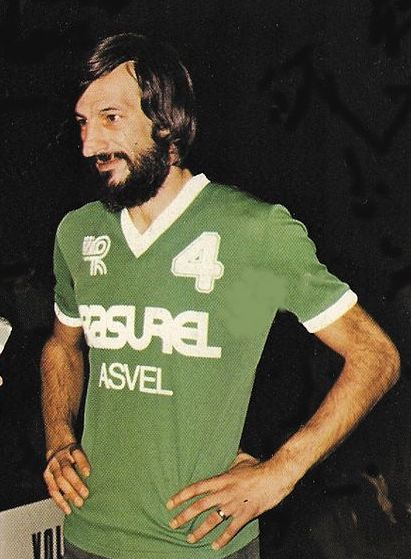
- Gilles, in 1980.

Personal information
- Born: 5 May 1945 Roanne, France
- Died: 18 November 2014 (aged 69) Montpellier, France
- Listed height: 6 ft 2 in (1.88 m)
- Listed weight: 175 lb (79 kg)

Career information
- Playing career: 1962–1986
- Position: Point guard / shooting guard
- Number: 4
- Coaching career: 1980–1993

Career history

Playing
- 1962–1965: Chorale Roanne
- 1965–1986: ASVEL

Coaching
- 1980–1989: ASVEL
- 1990–1993: Montpellier

Career highlights
- As player: FIBA's 50 Greatest Players (1991); Best French Player of the 20th Century; French National Sports Hall of Fame (2007); French Basketball Hall of Fame (2004); No. 4 retired by ASVEL; Legion of Honour; National Order of Merit (France); 8× French League champion (1966, 1968, 1969, 1971, 1972, 1975, 1977, 1981); 2× French Cup winner (1965, 1967); 3× French League Player of the Year (1965, 1967, 1968); As head coach: French League champion (1981); French Cup winner (1984)

Alain Gilles (5 May 1945 – 18 November 2014) was a French professional basketball player and coach. He was 1.88 m (6 ft 2 in) tall and played at the point guard and shooting guard positions.

His number 4 jersey was retired by ASVEL, and the club's logo was also designed in his honor. In 1991, Gilles was included in the FIBA's 50 Greatest Players' list. He was named The Best French Basketball Player of the 20th Century, by a panel of players, coaches, and journalists. He was nicknamed "Monsieur Basket" (English: "Mr. Basket").

The Alain Gilles Trophy ("The Best French Player Award") is named after him, in his honor by the French Federation of Basketball.

== Playing career ==
Gilles played for the French clubs Chorale Roanne (1962–1965) and ASVEL Basket (1965–1986). During his pro club career, he won 8 French League championships, and 2 French Cup titles. He also won 3 French League Player of the Year awards.

In France's top-tier level competition, Gilles scored a total of 18,502 career points. That is the 2nd most points scored in the history of the league, behind only Hervé Dubuisson's 19,013 career points scored.

== National team career ==
Gilles played in 160 games with the senior men's French national basketball team.

== Coaching career ==
Gilles was the head basketball coach of the French club ASVEL Basket (1980–1989) and the French club Montpellier (1990–1993). He won the French League championship in 1981, and the French Cup title in 1984.
