= Graylin Warner =

American basketball player (1962–2025)

- Born: Graylin Allen Warner; September 7, 1962; Tylertown, Mississippi, U.S.
- Died: July 17, 2025 (aged 62)

Graylin Allen Warner (September 7, 1962 – July 17, 2025) was an American professional basketball player. He played college basketball for the Louisiana Ragin' Cajuns.

== Career ==
Warner, a 6 ft 5 in (1.96 m) guard, played at the University of Louisiana at Lafayette from 1980 to 1984, averaging 14.4 points and 5.6 rebounds per game. Warner, valued for his versatility, reached the NCAA tournament twice with the team. In the 1984 NBA draft, he was selected by the Seattle SuperSonics in the sixth round with the 129th overall pick. Warner never played in the NBA, and signed with the Sarasota Stingers of the Continental Basketball Association (CBA) for the 1984-85 season, averaging 3.3 points in six games.

Warner continued his career in Europe, signing with the SSV Hagen Bundesliga team in the Basketball Bundesliga. During the 1984-85 season, Warner's eligibility to play was questioned as he had previously played as a professional in his home country during his two-month ban violated the amateur statute of the German Basketball Association. Bayer Leverkusen lodged an appeal, and Hagen was deducted four points. In the 1985–86 season, Warner played a significant role in Hagen finishing second in the table. In the Bundesliga quarterfinals, he and Hagen lost to BSC Saturn Cologne.

Warner played for Fabriano Basket in Italy in 1986–87, followed by five years of play for Cholet Basket in France. He averaged over 20 points per game in every season for Cholet from 1987 to 1992, with his highest score being 28.3 points per game in the 1988–89 season. In total, he scored 5,629 points in 226 appearances for Cholet. At the European level, Warner caused a sensation when he scored 45 points against Real Madrid in the quarter-final group stage of the European Cup Winners' Cup in January 1989, leading his team to victory over the Spaniards led by Drazen Petrovic. After a year in Greece with Pagrati Athens, Warner returned to France and played for ASA Sceaux Basket in the country's top division. Once again, he averaged more than 20 points per game. He took a break during the 1994–95 season, then Warner played for one year each until 1997 with the French second division teams Hyères Toulon (1995–96) and Toulouse Spacer's (1996–97). At the beginning of the 1997-98 season, he also played in the second division with Anjou BC in Angers, but returned to the United States in October 1997 for family reasons.

== Retirement ==
After his retirement, Warner worked as a truck driver while playing in a veterans' league in New Orleans.

Warner died of prostate cancer on July 17, 2025, at the age of 62. Cholet Basket retired the number 9 he wore as a tribute.
