= Espace 3000 =

Indoor sporting arena in Hyères, France

Coordinates: 43.105°N 6.129°E

Espace 3000 is an indoor sporting arena located in Hyères, France. The capacity of the arena is 2,500 people. It is currently home to the Hyères-Toulon Var Basket basketball team.
