= Ferenc Németh (basketball) =

Hungarian-French basketball player

Personal information
- Born: c. 1919 Hungary
- Listed height: 6 ft 5 in (1.96 m)
- Listed weight: 243 lb (110 kg)

Career information
- Playing career: 1946–1953
- Position: Center
- Number: 10

Career history
- 1947–1948: UA Marseille
- 1948–1950: ASVEL Villeurbanne
- 1950–1951: Paris Basket Racing

Career highlights
- As player: FIBA EuroBasket MVP (1946); 4× French League champion (1948–1951); 2× French League Best Scorer (1950, 1951); FIBA's 50 Greatest Players (1991)
Medals
Representing Hungary
Men's basketball
FIBA EuroBasket
Bronze medal – third place	1946 Geneva

Ferenc Németh (born c. 1919), also commonly known as François Németh, was a Hungarian-French professional basketball player. He played at the center position. He was named one of FIBA's 50 Greatest Players in 1991.

== Professional career ==
During his club playing career, Németh won 4 French League championships, in the years 1948, 1949, 1950, and 1951. He also led the French League in scoring, in 1950 and 1951.

He was the first player to score more than 50 points in a top-tier level French basketball league game, as he scored 55 points, on 11 February 1951, in a game against Hirondelles de Coutures, in an 82–55 win.

Németh moved to the Argentine League in 1951. After playing there for two years, he gained Argentine citizenship, in 1953.

== National team career ==
Németh helped lead the senior men's Hungarian national team, to a bronze medal at the 1946 FIBA EuroBasket, earning MVP honours in the process. Németh averaged 11.8 points per game in the tournament. He also played at the 1947 FIBA EuroBasket, where he averaged 9.3 points per game.
