= Arsène Ade-Mensah =

French former basketball player

Personal information
- Born: June 6, 1971 (age 55) Geneva, Switzerland
- Listed height: 1.82 m (6 ft 0 in)

Career information
- Playing career: 1990–2002
- Position: Point guard

Arsène Ade-Mensah (born June 6, 1971) is a retired French professional basketball player who played as a point guard. His career featured successful stints with several top European clubs and notable achievements in French basketball. He won LNB Pro A Best Defender in 1996 and 1998.

== Career ==
Ade-Mensah began his career with Olympique Antibes during the 1990–91 season, where he won the French National Championship in the 1990–91 and 1994–95 seasons. He then played for Paris Saint Germain Racing from 1996 to 1998, winning another French National Championship in the 1996–97 season.

He continued his career with Olympiacos Piraeus in Greece during the 1998–99 and 1999–2000 seasons, followed by a season with A.O. Near East in 2000–01. Ade-Mensah concluded his professional career with ASVEL Lyon-Villeurbanne in the 2001–02 season.

== Achievements ==
- French National Championship Titles: 1990–91 and 1994–95 with Olympique Antibes; 1996–97 with Paris Saint Germain Racing
