= Willie Davis (basketball) =

American basketball player

Personal information
- Born: August 9, 1945 (age 81) Fairfield, Texas, U.S.
- Listed height: 6 ft 8 in (2.03 m)
- Listed weight: 234 lb (106 kg)

Career information
- College: North Texas (1964–1968)
- NBA draft: 1968: 7th round, 81st overall pick
- Drafted by: Chicago Bulls
- Position: Center
- Number: 50

Career history
- 1968–1969: Wilmington Blue Bombers
- 1970: Texas Chaparrals
- 1972–1974: Scranton Apollos

Career highlights
- All-EBA First Team (1973); French League Best Scorer (1969)
- Stats at Basketball Reference

Willie Edward Davis (born August 9, 1945) is an American former professional basketball player.

== College career ==
Davis attended North Texas State University, where he played college basketball.

== Professional career ==
Davis was drafted in the seventh round of the 1968 NBA draft, by the Chicago Bulls, but he never played for them. He was the French League Best Scorer, in 1969. Davis spent one season in the American Basketball Association (ABA), as a member of the Texas Chaparrals, during the 1970–71 season.

Davis played in the Eastern Professional Basketball League (EPBL) / Eastern Basketball Association (EBA) for the Wilmington Blue Bombers during the 1968–69 season and the Scranton Apollos from 1972 to 1974. He was selected to the All-EBA First Team in 1973.
