= Jacques Cachemire =

French basketball player and coach

Personal information
- Born: 27 February 1947 (age 79) Pointe-a-Pitre, Guadeloupe
- Listed height: 6 ft 5.75 in (1.97 m)
- Listed weight: 210 lb (95 kg)

Career information
- Playing career: 1968–1984
- Position: Small forward / power forward
- Number: 12, 13, 14,
- Coaching career: 1983–1994

Career history

Playing
- 1968–1969: SA Lyon
- 1969–1979: Olympique Antibes
- 1979–1984: ASPO Tours

Coaching
- 1983–1984: ASPO Tours
- 1987–1992: Lourdes
- 1993–1994: RCM Toulouse

Career highlights
- As player: 3× FIBA European Selection (1974, 1975, 1979); 2× French League champion (1970, 1980); French League Best Scorer (1975); French National Sports Hall of Fame (2016); French Basketball Hall of Fame (2007)
Medals
Men's basketball
Representing France
Mediterranean Games
Silver medal – second place	1975 Algeria

Jacques Cachemire (born 27 February 1947 in Pointe-a-Pitre, Guadeloupe) is a French former professional basketball player and coach. At a height of 1.97 m (6'5 3/4") tall, he played at the small forward and power forward positions. He was inducted into the French Basketball Hall of Fame, in 2007. He was inducted into the French National Sports Hall of Fame in 2016.

== Club career ==
Cachemire was a member of the FIBA European Selection, in 1974, 1975, and 1979. He won the French League championship in 1970 and 1980. He was the French League Best Scorer, in 1975

== National team career ==
Cachemire had 250 caps with the senior men's French national basketball team, from 1969 to 1983. He scored 2,837 points with the senior French national team.

He played at 6 EuroBaskets: 1971, 1973, 1977, 1979, 1981, and 1983.
