= Thierry Rupert =

French basketball player

Personal information
- Born: 23 May 1977 Gonesse, France
- Died: 10 February 2013 (aged 35) Le Mans, France
- Listed height: 6 ft 8 in (2.03 m)

Career information
- Playing career: 1993–2012
- Position: Power forward

Career history
- 1993–1997: Poissy
- 1997–1999: Olympique Antibes
- 1999–2000: Limoges CSP
- 2000–2003: Paris Basket Racing
- 2003–2004: Strasbourg IG
- 2004–2008: Pau-Orthez
- 2008–2009: Elan Chalon
- 2009–2011: Le Mans Sarthe
- 2011: SPO Rouen
- 2011–2012: JDA Dijon

Thierry Rupert (23 May 1977 – 10 February 2013) was a French basketball player. Rupert had 35 selections for the French national men's basketball team from 2001 to 2004.

He played his entire career in the French Ligue Nationale de Basket.

== Personal life ==
Rupert is of Martiniquais descent. His son Rayan and daughter Iliana are also professional basketball players.
