= Azur Arena Antibes =

French sports arena

Azur Arena
- "Le Chaudron" ("The Cauldron")
- Interactive map of Azur Arena
- Full name: Azur Arena Antibes
- Address: Zone des Trois Moulins 06600 Antibes, France
- Coordinates: 43°36′21″N 7°04′36″E
- Capacity: Basketball: 5,249

Construction
- Opened: 15 August 2013
- Cost: €34 million euros
- Architect: Auer+Weber+Assoziierte

Tenant
- Antibes Sharks (2013–present)

The Azur Arena Antibes is a multi-purpose indoor arena that is located in Antibes, France. The arena can be to host basketball, gymnastics, handball, judo, tennis, and trampolining competitions, concerts, and cultural events. It is primarily used to host basketball games. The arena's seating capacity for basketball games is 5,249 people.

== History ==
Construction on the Azur Arena Antibes began in February 2011. The arena was opened on 15 August 2013, with a friendly game between the Serbian national team and the French national team. France won the game, by a score of 78–74. That game was a part of the 2013 Euro Tour, which was a basketball preparation tournament for the 2013 FIBA EuroBasket. The tournament took place from 15 August to 17 August 2013, and it featured the aforementioned national teams of France and Serbia, as well as the Georgian national team.

Since it opened, the arena has been used to host the home games of the French professional basketball club Antibes Sharks.

== See also ==
- List of indoor arenas in France
