= Ed Murphy (basketball, born 1956) =

American basketball player

Personal information
- Born: January 14, 1956 (age 70) Bayonne, New Jersey, U.S.
- Listed height: 6 ft 4 in (1.93 m)
- Listed weight: 200 lb (91 kg)

Career information
- High school: Marist (Bayonne, New Jersey)
- College: Merrimack (1974–1978)
- NBA draft: 1978: 8th round, 160th overall pick
- Drafted by: Atlanta Hawks
- Playing career: 1978–1990
- Position: Shooting guard / small forward
- Number: 8, 10, 12

Career history
- 1978–1979: BOB Oud-Beijerland
- 1979–1981: R.C. Mechelen
- 1981–1985: Limoges CSP
- 1985–1988: Champel de Genève
- 1988–1990: BBC Nyon

Career highlights
- 2× FIBA Korać Cup champion (1982, 1983); 2× FIBA Korać Cup Finals Top Scorer (1982, 1983); 3× French League champion (1983–1985); 3× French Federation Cup winner (1982, 1983, 1985); 3× French League Foreign MVP (1983–1985); 4× French League Top Scorer (1982–1985); No. 8 retired by Limoges (2016); French League's Best Foreign Player of the 20th Century (2020); French Basketball Hall of Fame (2021); Belgian League champion (1980); Belgian League Top Scorer (1980); Swiss League champion (1988); 2× Swiss Cup winner (1986, 1987); Swiss League Foreign MVP (1986); Dutch League Top Scorer (1979); Dutch League All-Star (1979); Merrimack Athletics Hall of Fame (1984); 2× First-team Division II All-American (1977, 1978); Second-team Division II All-American (1976); NCAA Division II scoring leader (1977)
- Stats at Basketball Reference

Edward Murphy (born January 14, 1956) is an American former professional basketball player. During his playing career, Murphy was nicknamed Radar, "Lucky Luke", and "Ed-la-Gâchette", which in French means, “Ed-the-Trigger”. During his pro club career, Murphy won two European-wide third-tier level FIBA Korać Cup championships, in the 1981–82 and 1982–83 seasons. He also won the Belgian Basketball League championship in the 1979–80 season, three French Pro A League championships (1982–83, 1983–84, and 1984–85), three French Federation Cup titles (1981–82, 1982–83, and 1984–85), and two Swiss Cup titles (1985–86 and 1986–87).

In 2016, Murphy's number 8 jersey was retired by Limoges CSP. In 2020, he was named the French League's Best Foreign Player of the 20th Century. Murphy was inducted into the French Basketball Hall of Fame, in 2021.

== Early life and high school career ==
Edward Murphy, more commonly known as Ed Murphy, was born in Bayonne, New Jersey. He started playing in organized school basketball competitions at a very young age, where he showed himself to be a young prodigy in the sport. At the age of 10, in an elementary school game, Murphy scored 68 points.

He later attended Marist High School. While at Marist High, the 6'4" tall shooting guard-small forward played high school basketball. At Marist, he quickly proved himself as a player, after spending hours of training working on adjusting his jump shots and overall basketball technique. During his 1973–74 senior high school season, Murphy averaged 33 points per game.

== College career ==
In 1974, Murphy decided to attend Merrimack College, where he played college basketball with the Merrimack Warriors, in the NCAA Division II, until 1978. In his 1974–75 college freshman season, Murphy, who was known for his long-distance shooting, averaged 15.0 points per game. In his 1975–76 college sophomore season, he averaged 23.0 points per game, and he was an NCAA II Second Team All-American selection.

During his junior season in 1976–77, Murphy led the NCAA division II in scoring, with an average of 32.0 points per game. During that same season, he set the Merrimack single-season school records, for both per game scoring average, at 32.0, and for the most total points scored in a single season, with 896. He was an NCAA division II First Team All-American selection for the 1976–77 season.

In his 1977–78 college senior season, Murphy averaged 31.3 points per game. He was also an NCAA II First Team All-American selection for the 1977–78 season. While at Merrimack, Murphy twice led the school to the NCAA Division II Sweet 16, in the 1976–77 and the 1977–78 seasons, where they lost both times to the Sacred Heart Pioneers. Murphy's career single-game scoring high with Merrimack was 48 points. He finished his college career as Merrimack's all-time leading scorer, in both points per game average, at 26.4, and in total points scored, with 2,874.

Murphy was inducted as an inaugural member of the Merrimack Athletics hall of fame in 1984.

== Professional career ==
Murphy was selected by the Atlanta Hawks, in the 8th round of the 1978 NBA draft, with the 160th overall draft pick. Since Murphy played at a small college basketball program, in the NCAA's Second Division, the Atlanta Hawks' management were only willing to offer him a non-guaranteed contract. Murphy decided to reject the Hawks' non-guaranteed contract offer. As a result, Murphy never played in the NBA, and instead decided to play professional club basketball in Europe. In September 1982, Murphy told the French basketball magazine Maxi-Basket, "It is too hard to hold on. So in the fall of '78, I decided to find a job. I worked for two months in the United Parcel Service, and in November, I got a call from Glinder Torain, who placed American players in Europe. I decided to come try my luck in the Netherlands".

=== BOB Oud-Beijerland (1978–1979) ===
At the age of 23, Murphy began his pro club career in the Netherlands, with the Dutch Basketball League club BOB Oud-Beijerland, where he played during the 1978–79 season. He signed a contract with BOB Oud-Beijerland in November 1978. His contract in the Netherlands was the result of advice that was given to the club by the sports agent Glinder Torain, and also due to the scouting of the team's player-coach, Charis Sideris. In his first Dutch League game, on 25 November 1978, Murphy made a sensational debut against the league's then defending champions, EBBC Den Bosch, as he scored 41 points in the game, despite his team losing the game by a sore of 90–109.

Murphy's performance provoked the ire of EBBC Den Bosch's head coach, Ton Boot. In a Dutch League game against Radio Muzette Rotterdam-Zuid, Murphy had another outstanding game, as he scored 49 points in the encounter. As a result of such performances, Murphy was selected to the Dutch League All-Star Game, in which he scored 30 points. His team's coach, Charis Sideris, would years later state that, "I remember how Wim Benschop and I had followed his successful campaign. We watched him play, with an excited look and a smile. The class". With a scoring average of 35.8 points per contest, Murphy was the leading scorer of the Dutch League, in the 1978–79 season. His club, BOB Oud-Beijerland, finished the season in fifth place in the league, with a losing record of 15–21, and thus failed to make the league's playoffs.

=== R.C. Mechelen (1979–1981) ===
After spending a season in the Netherlands, playing in the Dutch Basketball League, Murphy joined the Belgian Basketball League club R.C. Mechelen. In his first season with the club (1979–80), Murphy won Belgian League's championship. He also finished the season as the top scorer of the league, with a scoring average of 30.5 points per game.

Because R.C. Mechelen won the Belgian national league's championship, they thus qualified for the next season's edition of the FIBA European Champions' Cup (now known as the EuroLeague), which is the top-tier level pro club basketball competition in Europe. In the FIBA European Champions' Cup's 1980–81 season, Murphy averaged 17.0 points per game, and his team, R.C. Mechelen, was eliminated in the league's group stage. In the Belgian League, Murphy suffered an injury before the league's finals, and his team was then eliminated in the league's finals by Oostende.

During the Belgian League's 1980–81 season, Murphy averaged 29.8 points per game. Over his two seasons played in the Belgian League (1979–80 and 1980–81), Murphy was the league's leading scorer over that time span, with 1,108 total points scored. Murphy would later state this about his experience in Belgium, "I had good friends in Belgium, and the team worked fine. We won the title in '80, and lost in the finals, the following year."

=== Limoges CSP (1981–1985) ===
Murphy joined the French Basketball League club Limoges CSP, in 1981. Limoges' head coach at the time, André Buffière, had insisted on signing him. With Limoges, Murphy quickly silenced his critics, who had previously said that he was too unathletic and too slow for the French League. A pure shooter, Murphy would eventually become one of the best players in the history of the French League.

In the 1981–82 season, which was Murphy's first season with Limoges CSP, he scored an average of 29.8 points per game in the French League. He increased his scoring average in the French League, in each year that he spent with the club. He averaged 31.7 points per game in the French League's 1982–83 season, 32.3 points per game in the French League's 1983–84 season, and 34.1 points per game in the French League's 1984–85 season.

Murphy was the French League's Best Scorer in four straight seasons (1981–82, 1982–83, 1983–84, and 1984–85). He was also named the French League's Foreign Player's MVP of the 1982–83, 1983–84, and 1984–85 seasons. During his time with the club, Murphy helped Limoges win three French national league championship titles (1982–83, 1983–84, and 1984–85), three French Federation Cup titles, (1981–82, 1982–83, and 1984–85), and two European-wide third-tier level FIBA Korać Cup titles (1981–82 and 1982–83).

In the European third-tier FIBA Korać Cup's 1981–82 season, Murphy averaged 29.3 points per game. He also led his team to the league's championship. In the 1982 Korać Cup Final, Limoges defeated the Yugoslav League club Šibenka, and its legendary star player, Dražen Petrović, by a score of 90 to 84. Murphy was the FIBA Korać Cup Finals Top Scorer, with 35 points scored.

In the following FIBA Korać Cup 1982–83 season, Murphy averaged 28.6 points per game. He also again led his team to the league's championship. In the 1983 Korać Cup Final, Limoges once again defeated Šibenka, which was still led by Dražen Petrović, by a score of 94 to 86. Murphy was also once again the FIBA Korać Cup Finals Top Scorer, with 34 points scored.

In Europe's top-tier level competition, the FIBA European Champions' Cup (EuroLeague), Murphy averaged 33.0 points per game in the 1983–84 season. In the FIBA European Champions' Cup's 1984–85 season, Murphy averaged 30.5 points per game. On 17 November 1984, during his last season with Limoges (1984–85), Murphy scored 53 points, in a French League game against ES Avignon.

When reflecting on how his Limoges stint ended, at the conclusion of the 1984–85 season, Murphy said years later, "We had like a verbal agreement of a two-year contract, with Limoges, for two more years. But I couldn’t play, my Achilles… I never missed a game in four years. I was in pain, and I was getting treatment. I hadn't been practicing or anything, and they said I had to go, and I didn’t play in a game. And then Xavier Popelier (Limoges CSP's Chairman at the time), came in and told me I was no more on the team. So that is how my career ended in Limoges. (...) Back then, if you were an American, they would just change the American."

Over 30 years after he last played with Limoges, Murphy stated the following about his days spent with the club during home games, "I never played in a more exciting place. I never played in front of a public that vocal, that loud." In September 2016, over 30 years after having last played for the club, Murphy had his number 8 jersey retired by Limoges CSP. In 2020, he was named the French League's Best Foreign Player of the 20th Century. He was inducted into the French Basketball Hall of Fame, in 2021.

=== Champel de Genève 1985–1988 ===
Murphy continued his playing career with Champel de Genève of the Swiss Basketball League, after having parted ways with Limoges CSP, in 1985. Looking back on how he came to Switzerland, Murphy later said, "I was supposed to go to Naples, and it didn’t work out, and I had no job. I was home with no job, and I went up to Geneva. They had an international school. I loved it there. I just didn’t have a job, and they were the first ones to offer me a job; and then they offered me a good contract to stay, and I stayed."

In the 1985–86 season, Murphy averaged 40.1 points per game in the Swiss League. During that 1985–86 season, he scored 49 points in a Swiss League game against Viagenello. He was named the Swiss League's Foreign Player's MVP that season.

Murphy suffered a serious injury, acute phlebitis of the scapula, and because of that, he only played in a total of two Swiss national domestic league games, and one game in the European-wide second-tier level FIBA European Cup Winners' Cup for the team, in the 1986–87 campaign. He averaged 20.0 points per game in the Swiss League, in those two games played, and also 20.0 points per game in the one FIBA European Cup Winners' Cup game that he played in.

In the 1987–88 season, Murphy scored an average of 39.9 points a contest in the Swiss League for Geneva. During that same season in the Swiss League, he had a single-game season-high of 54 points, a total of four games in which he scored 50 points or more, and another 15 games in which he scored 40-plus points. Murphy also averaged 38.5 points per game in the European secondary level FIBA European Cup Winners' Cup's 1987–88 campaign.

=== Nyon 1988–1990 ===
Murphy moved to the Swiss Basketball League club BBC Nyon, for the 1988–89 season. During that 1988–89 season, he averaged 36.8 points per game in the Swiss League, and 22.5 points per game in the European-wide third-tier level FIBA Korać Cup's 1988–89 season. In that season's Swiss League, he had six 40+ point games, and single-game season highs of 54 points against Chêne Basket Geneve, on 16 November 1988, and 55 points against SF Lausanne Basket, on 19 November 1988.

In the following 1989–90 season, Murphy averaged 32.1 points per game in the Swiss League, and 28.0 points per game in the European third level FIBA Korać Cup's 1989–90 season. In that season's Swiss League, he had another six 40+ point games, and single-game season highs of 49 points against SF Lausanne Basket, on 21 October 1989, and 49 points against Pully, on 17 February 1990. In 1990, after finishing the 1989–90 season with Nyon, Murphy retired from playing professional club basketball, at the age of 34.

== Retirement ==
Murphy is married he and his wife have three daughters. Since retirement he has worked as a supervisor at Hasbro, a company that designs toys, such as Monopoly.
