= Pierre Galle =

French basketball player and coach

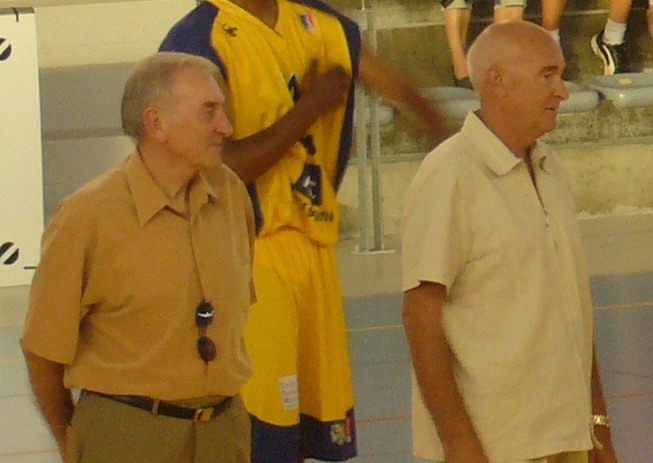
- Pierre and Jean Galle in 2008

Personal information
- Born: 13 January 1945 (age 81) Calais, France
- Listed height: 5 ft 11 in (1.80 m)

Career information
- Playing career: 1965–1979
- Position: Point guard / shooting guard
- Coaching career: 1981–2003

Career history

Playing
- 1965–1966: SA Lyon
- 1970–1976: AS Berck
- 1976–1977: AS Denain Voltaire
- 1977–1979: Caen Basket Club

Coaching
- 1981–1985: AS Montferrand
- 1986–1989: Montpellier
- 1989–1991: ASVEL
- 1992–1994: HTV Basket
- 1999–2003: Montpellier-Lattes

Career highlights
- As player: 2× French League champion (1973, 1974); 2× French League Player of the Year (1973, 1974); As head coach: French 2nd Division champion (1988)

Pierre Galle (born 13 January 1945) is a French former professional basketball player and coach.

Galle was the French League Player of the Year in 1973 and 1974.

He was a member of the senior French national team from 1968 to 1975.

As a head coach, Galle coached ASVEL Basket from 1989 to 1991, Hyères-Toulon Var Basket from 1992 to 1994, and other pro clubs.

Galle's brother, Jean, is also a basketball coach.
