= Dennis Stewart (basketball) =

American basketball player

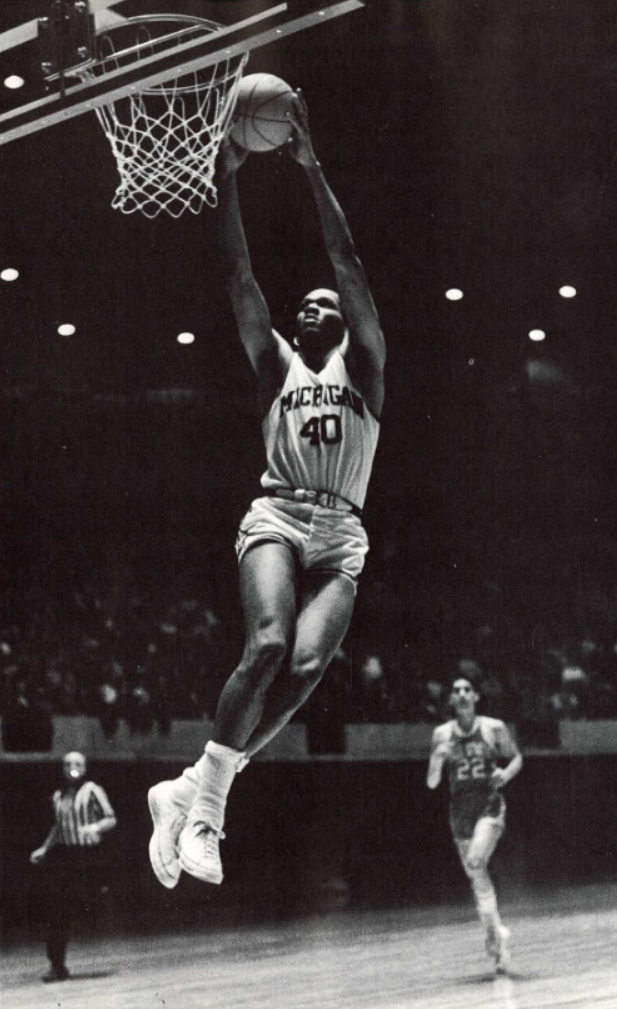
- Stewart from 1967 "Michiganensian"

Personal information
- Born: April 11, 1947 Steelton, Pennsylvania, U.S.
- Died: April 13, 2022 (aged 75)
- Listed height: 6 ft 6 in (1.98 m)
- Listed weight: 220 lb (100 kg)

Career information
- High school: Steelton-Highspire (Steelton, Pennsylvania)
- College: Michigan (1966–1969)
- NBA draft: 1969: 4th round, 44th overall pick
- Drafted by: Phoenix Suns
- Playing career: 1970–1979
- Position: Forward
- Number: 40, 22

Career history

Playing
- 1970: Baltimore Bullets
- 1970–1971: The Floridians
- 1971–1972: Grand Rapids Tackers
- 1973–1974: JA Vichy
- 1974–1975: Cherry Hill Pros
- 1975–1976: Wilkes-Barre Barons
- 1976–1979: Lancaster Red Roses

Coaching
- 2004–2005: Lawrenceville Jazz

Career highlights
- French League Best Scorer (1974)
- Stats at NBA.com
- Stats at Basketball Reference

Dennis Edward Stewart (April 11, 1947 – April 13, 2022) was an American professional basketball player. He played briefly in the National Basketball Association (NBA) and American Basketball Association (ABA), as well as other leagues in the United States and France.

Stewart played college basketball for the Michigan Wolverines.

Stewart was selected in the 1969 NBA draft, by the Phoenix Suns. Although Stewart never played for the Suns, he did play in the NBA with the Baltimore Bullets. He also played in the American Basketball Association (ABA), Continental Basketball Association (CBA), and abroad in France. Stewart was a CBA All-Star in 1971–72, when he averaged 31 points per game for the Grand Rapids Tackers. He was the French League Best Scorer, in 1974. Stewart's professional career spanned from 1970 to 1979.

Stewart died on April 13, 2022 at 75.

== Career statistics ==
Legend
GP	Games played	GS	Games started	MPG	Minutes per game
FG%	Field goal percentage	3P%	3-point field goal percentage	FT%	Free throw percentage
RPG	Rebounds per game	APG	Assists per game	SPG	Steals per game
BPG	Blocks per game	PPG	Points per game	**Bold**	Career high

=== ABA ===
==== Regular season ====
Year	Team	GP	MPG	FG%	3P%	FT%	RPG	APG	PPG
1970–71	Baltimore (NBA)	2	3.0	.250		**1.000**	**1.5**	**.5**	2.0
1970–71	Florida (ABA)	**10**	**6.6**	**.341**	.333	.714	1.4	.1	**3.6**
Career		12	6.0	.333	.333	.778	1.4	.2	3.3
