= Rick Hughes =

American basketball player (born 1973)

Personal information
- Born: August 22, 1973 (age 53) Cincinnati, Ohio, U.S.
- Listed height: 6 ft 9 in (2.06 m)
- Listed weight: 235 lb (107 kg)

Career information
- High school: Walnut Hills (Cincinnati, Ohio)
- College: Thomas More (1992–1996)
- NBA draft: 1996: undrafted
- Playing career: 1996–2012
- Position: Power forward / center
- Number: 3

Career history
- 1996–1997: Dakota Wizards
- 1997–1998: Omonia Nicosia
- 1998–1999: Club Rosaire
- 1999–2000: Dallas Mavericks
- 2000: Idaho Stampede
- 2001: Ourense
- 2002: Kansas City Knights
- 2002–2003: JDA Dijon Basket
- 2003: Sporting Al Riyadi Beirut
- 2003–2004: Strasbourg IG Basket
- 2004: Teramo Basket
- 2006: Murcia
- 2006–2008: León
- 2008–2009: HTV Basket
- 2009–2010: León
- 2010: APOEL
- 2010–2012: HTV Basket

Career highlights
- French League Foreign MVP (2004); 2× French League Best Scorer (2004, 2011)
- Stats at NBA.com
- Stats at Basketball Reference

Rick Hughes (born August 22, 1973) is an American former professional basketball player. He was the French League Best Scorer, in 2004 and 2011.

== College career ==
Hughes graduated from Walnut Hills High School, in Cincinnati, Ohio, in 1991, and afterwards, he attended Thomas More College. He was a four-year standout while at TMC, during the 1992–1996 seasons. He is the only player in the now defunct conference (AMC), to have been the Rookie of the Year, a four-time Player of the Year, a four-time Conference First Team Selection, a three-time Tournament MVP, a four-time Tournament First Team selection, and a four-time scoring leader. Hughes was also a Division 3 All-American during his junior and senior seasons. He left Thomas More as the school's all-time scoring leader with 2,605 points, and currently holds ten additional records. In 2002, Hughes was selected to Thomas More College's Hall of Fame.

== Professional career ==
Not drafted as a senior, Hughes was forced to go the free agent route, earning a spot with the Phoenix Suns, for the Summer Pro League in Los Angeles. Eventually, he went to Cyprus to play, and excelled in his first professional season. He averaged over 26 points and 13 rebounds per game, and once again garnered interest from the NBA, this time from the Atlanta Hawks. With the NBA lockout looming, Hughes went back overseas; this time to Lebanon. During the 1998–1999 season, Hughes averaged over 36 points and 15 rebounds per game.

After a stint with the Dallas Mavericks, he went back to Europe, in January 2000, and began the next step in his pro career. Having played in Cyprus, Lebanon, Italy, Spain, and France, Hughes won multiple titles, promotions to higher divisions, and MVP awards, along with numerous scoring titles, showing his ability to adapt and compete at an advanced age.
