= Edwin Jackson (basketball) =

French-American basketball player (born 1989)

- Jackson with ASVEL in 2026

No. 11 – ASVEL
- Position: Shooting guard
- League: LNB Élite; EuroLeague

Personal information
- Born: September 18, 1989 (age 37) Pau, France
- Listed height: 6 ft 3 in (1.91 m)
- Listed weight: 200 lb (91 kg)

Career information
- NBA draft: 2011: undrafted
- Playing career: 2007–present

Career history
- 2007–2014: ASVEL
- 2008–2009: →Nanterre
- 2009–2010: →Rouen
- 2014–2015: Barcelona
- 2015–2016: Málaga
- 2016–2017: Estudiantes
- 2017–2018: Guangdong Southern Tigers
- 2018: Barcelona
- 2018–2019: Budućnost
- 2019–2020: ASVEL
- 2020: →Estudiantes
- 2020–2022: Estudiantes
- 2022: Nanterre
- 2022–2023: Menorca
- 2023–present: ASVEL

Career highlights
- Montenegrin League champion (2019); Montenegrin Cup winner (2019); ACB scoring champion (2017); All-ACB First Team (2017); Pro A French Player's MVP (2013); Pro A scoring champion (2014); Pro A Most Improved Player (2013)

Edwin Jackson (born September 18, 1989) is a French-American professional basketball player for ASVEL of the LNB Élite and the EuroLeague. Standing at 6 ft 3 in (1.91 m), he plays at the shooting guard position.

== Professional career ==
Jackson played with ASVEL Lyon-Villeurbanne's youth team as a junior. He made thirty appearances for the club's senior team in the 2007–08 season, his first full season with the club. He was later loaned to Pro-B team JSF Nanterre for the 2008–09 season and Pro-A team SPO Rouen Basket for the 2009–10 season. In the 2009–10 season, he averaged 10.7 points, 3 rebounds, and 1 steal per game. He was selected to the French League All-Star Game as a result of his performance. He returned to ASVEL in 2010.

Jackson initially declared as an early-entry candidate for the 2010 NBA draft before withdrawing his name from consideration. He eventually went undrafted in the 2011 NBA draft, due to auto-eligibility at age 22.

He won French Pro A MVP honors in 2013 and led the league in scoring, in the 2013–14 season (18.2 points per game).

On 20 December 2014, Jackson moved to the Spanish League club FC Barcelona, where he signed for the remainder of the 2014–15 season. On 8 July 2015, he signed a one-year contract with the Spanish club Unicaja Málaga.

On 15 August 2016, he signed a one-year deal with Estudiantes.

On June 21, 2017, Jackson signed with the Guangdong Southern Tigers of the Chinese Basketball Association. On January 5, 2018, Jackson was waived by the Guangdong Southern Tigers after the team lost 96-104 against Xinjiang Flying Tigers. On January 29, 2018, he returned to FC Barcelona, signing a contract for the rest of the 2017–18 season.

On June 13, 2018, Edwin signed a contract with Montenegrin club Budućnost Voli Podgorica.

On June 28, 2019, he has signed 4-year deal with LDLC ASVEL of the LNB Pro A.

On August 26, 2022, he has signed with Nanterre 92 of the LNB Pro A.

== National team career ==
=== French junior national team ===
Jackson played with the junior national teams of France at each level of junior basketball. He appeared for the team at the 2006 FIBA Europe Under-18 Championship, 2007 FIBA Under-19 World Cup, and the 2008 and 2009 FIBA Europe Under-20 Championships. In 2006, he helped the French Under-18 team to a gold medal; and followed that up with a bronze medal in the Under-19 World Cup the following year. In the 2009 European Under-20 tournament, Jackson scored a game-high 32 points in the gold medal game, although the French fell short, winning the silver medal.

=== French senior national team ===
Jackson was selected to the senior men's French national basketball team for the first time, at the 2010 FIBA World Championship. At only 20 years of age, he was the second youngest member of the French team at the tournament. He won a bronze medal at the 2014 FIBA World Cup.

== Career statistics ==
Legend
GP	Games played	GS	Games started	MPG	Minutes per game
FG%	Field-goal percentage	3P%	3-point field-goal percentage	FT%	Free-throw percentage
RPG	Rebounds per game	APG	Assists per game	SPG	Steals per game
BPG	Blocks per game	PPG	Points per game	PIR	Performance index rating
**Bold**	Career high

=== EuroLeague ===
Year	Team	GP	GS	MPG	FG%	3P%	FT%	RPG	APG	SPG	BPG	PPG	PIR
2014–15	Barcelona	11	6	12.8	.303	.200	.833	1.4	1.3	.4	.0	3.0	2.7
2015–16	Málaga	24	10	20.1	.392	.328	.857	1.4	**2.5**	.2	.0	8.9	8.0
2017–18	Barcelona	9	2	14.6	.457	**.455**	**1.000**	1.9	1.2	**.8**	.0	4.6	5.3
2018–19	Budućnost	30	**22**	**26.4**	.439	.429	.850	**2.5**	1.9	.7	**.1**	**9.8**	**8.7**
2019–20	ASVEL	17	11	20.1	.273	.098	.794	1.5	1.6	.4	**.1**	5.8	3.5
2023–24	ASVEL	**31**	11	15.4	**.517**	.354	.818	1.1	1.0	.4	.0	5.3	4.7
Career		122	62	19.4	.407	.331	.836	1.7	1.6	.4	.0	6.9	6.0

=== EuroCup ===
Year	Team	GP	GS	MPG	FG%	3P%	FT%	RPG	APG	SPG	BPG	PPG	PIR
2007–08	ASVEL	10	0	7.1	.263	.091	**1.000**	.4	.4	.1	—	1.3	-0.2
2010–11	ASVEL	2	0	11.5	.200	.333	.000	—	.5	—	—	1.5	0.0
2011–12	ASVEL	**12**	**11**	26.4	**.467**	.325	.868	2.5	2.1	.9	—	11.0	11.5
2013–14	ASVEL	10	10	**28.8**	.426	**.404**	.818	2.9	**3.3**	.9	—	**14.2**	14.4
2014–15	ASVEL	9	9	28.4	.441	.383	.794	**3.1**	3.2	**1.2**	**.1**	14.1	**14.9**
Career		43	30	22.3	.429	.354	.817	2.1	2.1	.7	.0	9.7	9.6

=== Domestic leagues ===
Year	Team	League	GP	MPG	FG%	3P%	FT%	RPG	APG	SPG	BPG	PPG
2005–06	(France) INSEP	NM1	33	20.4	.438	.335	.807	2.4	1.4	.6	.1	10.5
2007–08	(France) ASVEL	Pro A	28	8.7	.329	.220	.625	.6	.7	.2	.1	2.3
2008–09	(France) JSF Nanterre	Pro B	31	30.1	.492	.333	.716	2.5	1.9	.7	.1	13.0
2009–10	(France) Rouen Métropole	Pro A	29	26.2	.425	.333	.767	3.1	1.3	1.0	.1	10.7
2010–11	(France) ASVEL	Pro A	30	12.8	.446	.281	.933	1.3	.8	.5	.0	5.6
2011–12	(France) ASVEL	Pro A	30	27.6	.436	.348	.851	2.5	2.4	.6	.1	11.3
2012–13	(France) ASVEL	Pro A	35	29.9	.469	.386	.830	3.4	2.8	.9	.1	16.1
2013–14	(France) ASVEL	Pro A	32	31.9	.464	.353	.872	3.5	2.2	1.0	.1	18.0
2014–15	(France) ASVEL	Pro A	10	30.1	.453	.356	.895	4.2	3.4	1.2	.3	18.4
2014–15	(Spain) Barcelona	ACB	20	15.3	.407	.448	.933	.9	1.1	.2	—	5.5
2015–16	(Spain) Málaga	ACB	34	16.0	.380	.347	.747	1.2	1.8	.4	.0	6.5
2016–17	(Spain) Estudiantes	ACB	32	30.3	.495	.373	.868	3.5	3.4	1.0	.0	21.4
2017–18	(China) Guangdong S. T.	CBA	24	32.6	.477	.380	.729	4.5	4.2	.9	.2	15.8
2017–18	(Spain) Barcelona	ACB	21	15.9	.435	.400	.844	1.9	.9	.5	.0	5.5
2018–19	(Montenegro) Budućnost	Prva A	16	30.3	.485	.402	.759	3.1	4.9	.9	.2	17.4
2018–19	(Montenegro) Budućnost	ABA	29	25.0	.423	.362	.842	2.7	2.2	.8	.1	10.6
2019–20	(France) ASVEL	LNB Élite	17	23.1	.423	.353	.894	2.3	2.2	.8	.2	11.9
2019–20	(Spain) Estudiantes	ACB	2	32.0	.120	.154	.800	3.5	6.0	—	—	6.0
2020–21	(Spain) Estudiantes	ACB	11	21.3	.310	.269	.667	2.6	2.3	.4	—	6.4
2021–22	(Spain) Estudiantes	LEB Oro	15	19.8	.441	.313	.778	2.5	2.2	.3	.1	8.6
2022–23	(France) Nanterre	LNB Élite	4	13.3	.500	.250	1.000	.7	1.0	.2	—	2.7
2022–23	(Spain) Menorca	LEB Plata	20	26.5	.461	.309	.846	2.7	1.6	1.0	.0	18.2
2023–24	(France) ASVEL	LNB Élite	37	20.8	.465	.451	.800	2.2	2.2	.6	.1	8.0

== Personal life ==
Edwin is the son of Skeeter Jackson, who was born in Louisiana, and played college basketball at Southwestern Oklahoma State University. He later played professionally in France, where he met Caroline, Edwin's mother. After receiving French citizenship, Skeeter Jackson had 41 caps with the senior French men's national team, between 1987 and 1989.
