= Alsace de Bagnolet =

- Founded: 1924
- History: 1924 to present
- Arena: Michel Saudemont
- Location: Bagnolet, France
- Team colors: Red and white
- Championships: 2 French Leagues; 1 French League 2
- Website: alsace-de-bagnolet.fr
Home	Away

Alsace de Bagnolet or Alsace Bagnolet is a French basketball club founded in 1924 and based in Bagnolet in the eastern suburbs of Paris. It is a part of the sports club of the same name founded in 1908. It belonged to the highest level championship of France in the 1960s, winning three league titles. In 2006, the club tried to restructure itself in order to regain entry to the Championship of France. It currently operates in National League Three.

== History ==
The club was formed in 1908 by Father Rouan, the patronage of St. Léon devient l'Alsace de Bagnolet en 1921 en souvenir de l'Alsace redevenue française becomes Alsace de Bagnolet in 1921 in tribute to the Alsace soldiers returning to the French state after World War I. The basketball section, even though the first team was founded in 1924, first achieved prominence in 1938 by winning the National Cup in gymnastics under the Sports Federation of France (FGSPF).

In the 1950s, the club experienced a new momentum thanks to Emile Touzet who took the presidential chair. He built a club house in the courtyard of patronage and the Michel-Saudemont gym. From 1960 to 1970 Alsace succeeds sports association awakening ASVEL awards at the federal championship France Sports Federation (FSF). In the same years, the club won three league titles in France in 1960-61, 1961–62 and 1966–67, came twice in the round of 16 of the FIBA European Champions Cup in 1961-62 and 1962-63. Ιn the first case the obstacle was the Belgian Antwerpse and in the second Ivo Daneu's Olimpija from Ljubljana. The 1967-68 season, Alsace Bagnolet returned to European Champions Cup but eliminated in the first round by Maccabi Tel Aviv.

Despite the second place in 1972-73, the club does not always pays its players except the American reinforcements. Alsace de Bagnolet permanently leaves the world of French basketball high level in 1978. The club refuses upmanship of professional sports, but still exists with 220 graduates in 2008.

== Honours ==
French League

- Winners (3): 1960-61, 1961–62, 1966–67

French Cup

- Runners-up (3): 1962-63, 1964–65, 1968–69

French League 2

- Winners (1): 1958-59

== Notable players ==
- (France) Christian Berté
- (France) Gérard Berté
- (France) Franck Cazalon
- (France) Laurent Dorigo
- (France) Maxime Dorigo
- (France) George Eddy
- (France) Jean-Marie Jouaret
- (France) Michel Longueville
- (France) Gérard Mayeur
- (France) Bernard Mayeur
- (France) Léon Toffolon
- (France) Victor Toffolon

== Head coaches ==
- (France) Auguste Taravella (?-1966)
- (France) Maxime Dorigo (1966-76 & 1978)
- (France) Pascal Esquillian (1976–78)

== Bibliography ==
- Yves Chéné (2008), Association Ecrits et Mémoires (ed.), Union d'Anjou FSCF : D'hier à aujourd'hui, 100 ans de vie associative depuis les patronages (1907-2007), Angers, p. 176, ISBN 978-2-914787-32-1
- Jean-Marie Jouaret (1999), FSCF (à compte d’auteur, imp. Déja-Glmc) (ed.), Petite histoire partielle et partiale de la Fédération sportive et culturelle de France (1948-1998), vol. 1, Paris, ISBN 2-9528-3870-4, Jean-Marie Jouaret tome 1
- Arnaud Lecomte (2007), L'Équipe (ed.), La Grande histoire du basket français, Saint-Étienne, ISBN 978-2-91553556-3
