= Jerry McCullough =

American basketball player

Personal information
- Born: November 26, 1973 (age 52) New York City, New York, U.S.
- Listed height: 5 ft 11 in (1.80 m)

Career information
- High school: Rice (New York City, New York)
- College: Pittsburgh (1991–1996)
- NBA draft: 1996: undrafted
- Playing career: 1996–2009
- Position: Point guard

Career history
- 1996–1997: New Hampshire Thunder Loons
- 1997–1998: Gravelines
- 1998–1999: Türk Telekom
- 1999–2000: Sioux Falls Skyforce
- 2000: Quad City Thunder
- 2000–2001: Pau-Orthez
- 2001–2003: Oregon Scientific Cantu
- 2003–2004: Metis Varese
- 2004–2005: Armani Jeans Milano
- 2005–2006: Dynamo Saint Petersburg
- 2006: Cibona Zagreb
- 2007–2008: UNICS Kazan
- 2008–2009: Pistoia Basket

Career highlights
- French League Foreign MVP (1998); French League Best Scorer (1998)

Jamal Sharif McCullough (born November 26, 1973) is an American former professional basketball player. He spent most of his professional career playing in Europe.

== College career ==
McCullough played college basketball at Pittsburgh, from 1991 to 1996.

== Professional career ==
McCullough was the top-tier level French League's Best Scorer, in 1998. McCullough also got French League Foreign MVP in the same year. McCullough now works at Bronx Charter School for Excellence 2 Middle School where he is a Physical Education teacher and a basketball coach for the school.
