= Olympique Antibes =

Antibes Sharks
- Nickname: OAJLP
- Leagues: LNB Pro B
- Founded: 1933; 93 years ago
- History: Olympique Antibes (1933–2012); Antibes Sharks (2012–present)
- Arena: Azur Arena Antibes
- Capacity: 5,249
- Location: Antibes, France
- Team colors: Navy, Gold, Azure, White
- Head coach: Daniel Goethals
- Championships: 3 French Championships; 1 Pro B Leaders Cup
- Retired numbers: 1 (4)
- Website: sharks-antibes.com
Home	Away

Olympique Antibes, in full Olympique d'Antibes Juan-les-Pins and branded as Antibes Sharks, is a basketball club from the city of Antibes, France. Established in 1933, the club's men's senior team currently plays in LNB Pro B, the French second division. The club has won the French championship three times, the last being in 1995.

== History ==
The basketball team rose to prominence in the years 1950–60. In 1970, the team won the championship of France thanks to players of exception like Jean-Claude Bonato, Dan Rodriguez and Jacques Cachemire.

At the beginning of the Eighties, Antibes suffered several disappointing seasons, but improved throughout the decade, and eventually won the LNB Pro A title in 1991. At the beginning of the Nineties, Antibes regularly contended for titles alongside Limoges CSP and Pau-Orthez.

In 1995, the club won a third national title before being plagued by financial problems. In 2002, in spite of finishing in a position that would have kept them safe from relegation, the club was dropped to LNB Pro B for lack of financial guarantees. Antibes then went through difficult years in Pro B. Then, in 2006–07, the club were relegated from Pro B to the nominally amateur Nationale 1. Although their 16th-place finish that season would normally have kept them safe from relegation, that season saw three teams relegated instead of the normal two because of a decision to reduce the number of teams in the top Pro A league. They would return to the professional ranks at the first opportunity, winning the Pro B crown in 2008.

For the 2013 season, Antibes has new ambitions in a Pro B league where the other favourites are clubs like Pau-Orthez, Hyères Toulon, two teams coming from Pro A, and JL Bourg Basket. They end up in fifth place at the end of the regular season and win the play-offs against Champagne Châlons Reims, synonym with a spot in the Pro A championship from next season. Yet in the following year, they finish bottom of the league with 6 wins and 24 defeats, and returned once more to the Pro B.

During the 2014–2015 season, they finish 6th of the regular season, and win also the B Leaders Cup, a victory that, as a matter of fact, guaranteed them a playoff spot. They win the playoffs against Denain after having defeated Nantes and Le portel on their way to the final. Just one year after leaving the Pro A championship they earned the right to go back to the elite tier.

== Arenas ==
From 1951 to 1991, Olympique Antibes played their home games at the Salusse-Santoni Hall, which has a seating capacity of 1,300 people. From 1991 to 2009, Olympique Antibes played their homes games at the 5,051 seat Jean Bunoz Sports Hall. Since 2013, the club hosts their home games at the Azur Arena Antibes. The arena is located in Antibes, France, and it was opened in 2013. It has a seating capacity of 5,249 people for basketball games.

== Honours ==
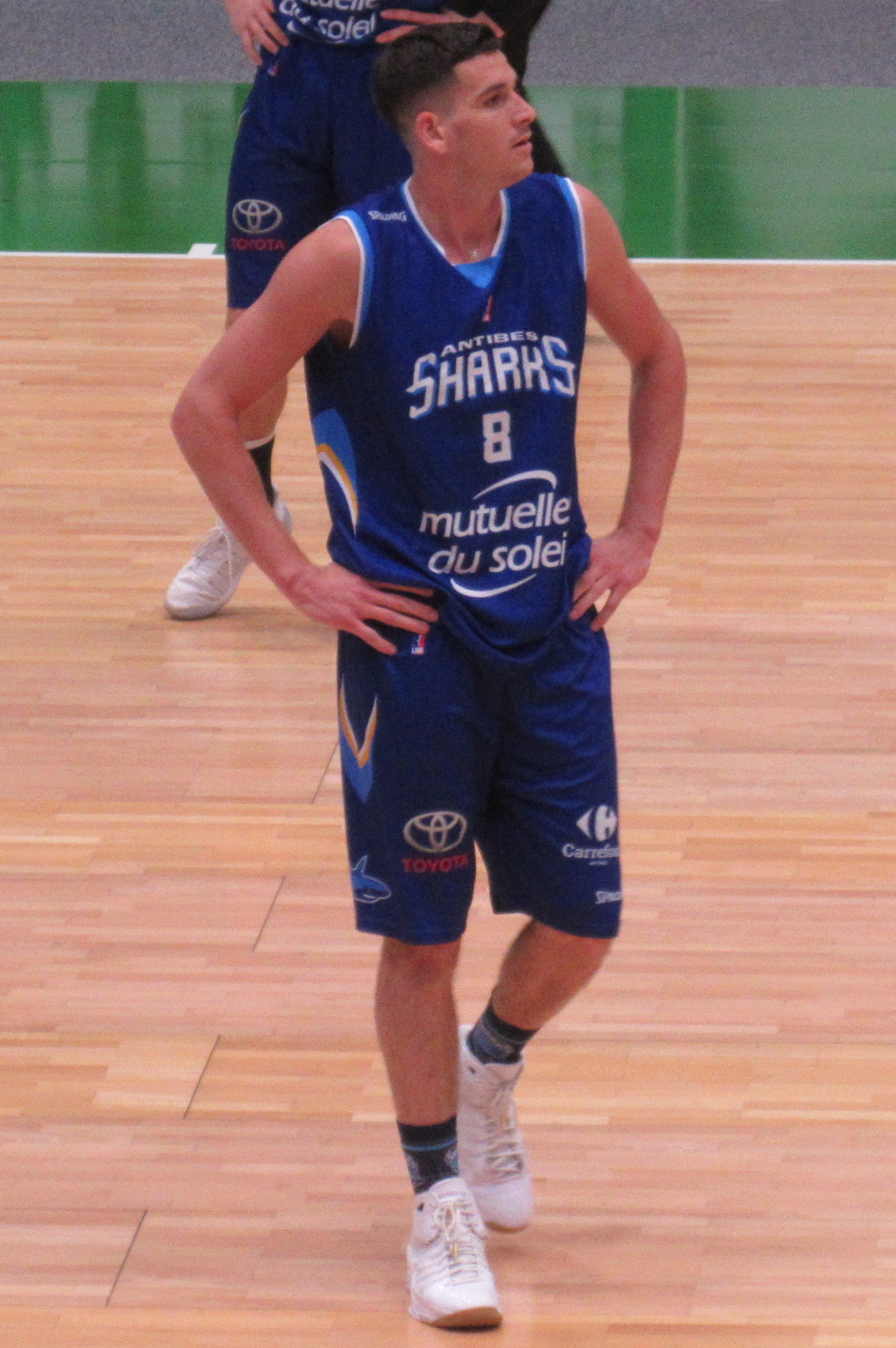
Frédéric Bourdillon

- French League

Winners (3):1969–70, 1990–91, 1994–95

- French League 2

Winners (1): 2012–13

- French League 3

Winners (1): 2007–08

- LNB Pro B Leaders Cup

Winners (1): 2015

== Season by season ==
Season	Tier	League	Pos.	French Cup
2008–09	2	Pro B	11th	Round of 16
2009–10	2	Pro B	16th	Quarterfinalist
2010–11	2	Pro B	14th	Quarterfinalist
2011–12	2	Pro B	11th	Round of 32
2012–13	2	Pro B	5th	Round of 16
2013–14	1	Pro A	16th	Round of 64
2014–15	2	Pro B	2nd	
2015–16	1	Pro A	12th	
2016–17	1	Pro A	14th	
2017–18	1	Pro A	16th	

== Top performances in European & Worldwide competitions ==
Season	Achievement	Notes
EuroLeague
1970–71	Quarter-finals	4th place in a group with Ignis Varese, Slavia VŠ Praha and AŠK Olimpija
FIBA Saporta Cup
1994–95	Semi-finals (third)	eliminated 2-1 by Benetton Treviso, 95-88 (W) in Treviso, 93-99 (L) and 83-87 (L) in Antibes
FIBA Korać Cup
1972	Semi-finals	eliminated by OKK Beograd, 72-99 (L) in Belgrade and 65-61 (W) in Antibes
1983–84	Semi-finals	eliminated by Orthez, 68-75 (L) in Orthez and 71-69 (W) in Antibes
1985–86	Semi-finals	eliminated by Banco di Roma Virtus, 69-78 (L) in Antibes and 75-83 (L) in Rome
1993–94	Quarter-finals	eliminated by Recoaro Milano, 85-98 (L) in Milan and 95-88 (W) in Antibes

== Players ==
=== Retired numbers ===
Antibes Sharks retired numbers
N°	Player	Position	Tenure	Ceremony date
4	Tim Blue	Forward	2012–2020	10 March 2022

=== Current roster ===
Note: Flags indicate national team eligibility at FIBA-sanctioned events. Players may hold other non-FIBA nationalities not displayed.

Antibes Sharks roster
Players
Coaches

Pos.	No.	Nat.	Name	Ht.	Age
C	1	(United States)	Yussuf, Temidayo	2.01 m (6 ft 7 in)	30 – 2 June 1996
PG	3	(France)	Amsellem, Vincent	1.93 m (6 ft 4 in)	24 – 11 March 2002
SG	5	(France)	Monclar, Benjamin	1.91 m (6 ft 3 in)	38 – 3 May 1988
F/C	6	(France)	Ca, Étienne	2.05 m (6 ft 9 in)	29 – 6 March 1997
PG	7	(Cameroon)	Pitard, Gédéon	1.87 m (6 ft 2 in)	37 – 7 February 1989
SG	10	(United States)	Castlin, Kyle	1.93 m (6 ft 4 in)	30 – 30 May 1996
G	12	(United States)	Pollard, Xavier	1.93 m (6 ft 4 in)	34 – 20 December 1991
F/C	21	(France)	Hernandez, Sullivan	2.04 m (6 ft 8 in)	30 – 27 December 1995
PF	24	(France)	Negrobar, Ludovic	2.08 m (6 ft 10 in)	35 – 1 September 1991
F	25	(Cameroon)	Moute a Bidias, Roger	1.98 m (6 ft 6 in)	31 – 22 April 1995
G/F	32	(United States)	Derksen, Timothy	1.92 m (6 ft 4 in)	33 – 27 July 1993
G	77	(France)	Rajaofera, Stellan	1.96 m (6 ft 5 in)	22 – 15 July 2004
PF	22	(Ukraine)	Petrov, Viacheslav	2.04 m (6 ft 8 in)	32 – 13 August 1994

Head coach

- (Belgium) Daniel Goethals

Assistant coach(es)

- (Switzerland) Stephane Neff
- (France) (Switzerland) Antoine Mantey

Legend

- (C) Team captain
- Injured

- Roster
Updated: May 3, 2023

=== Notable players ===
Note: Flags indicate national team eligibility at FIBA-sanctioned events. Players may hold other non-FIBA nationalities not displayed.

Criteria

To appear in this section a player must have either:

- Set a club record or won an individual award while at the club
- Played at least one official international match for their national team at any time
- Played at least one official NBA match at any time.

- (France) Yann Bonato
- (France) Timothé Luwawu-Cabarrot
- (France) Isaia Cordinier
- (France) Jacques Cachemire
- (France) Hervé Dubuisson
- (France) (Israel) Frédéric Bourdillon
- (Central African Republic) Max Kougere
- (Cameroon) Alfred Aboya
- (Finland) Carl Lindbom
- (Mali) Sadio Doucouré
- (Senegal) Mouhamed Sene
- (Switzerland) David Ramseier
- (United States) Tim Blue
- (United States) David Rivers
- (United States) Micheal Ray Richardson
- (United States) Tre Simmons
- (United States) Will Solomon
- (United States) Roger Phegley
- (United States) Bill Varner
- (United States) Byron Wesley

== Head coaches ==
- (France) Hervé Dubuisson
