= French Basketball Cup =

Basketball competition

- Current season, competition or edition: 2025–26 French Basketball Cup
- Sport: Basketball
- Founded: 1953
- No. of teams: 64
- Country: France
- Continent: Europe
- Most recent champion: AS Monaco (2nd title) (2025–26)
- Most titles: ASVEL (11 titles; 10 French Cups and 1 Federation Cup)
- Related competitions: LNB Élite; LNB Pro B Leaders Cup (French League Cup); Match des Champions (French Supercup)
- Website: coupedefrance.ffbb.com

The French Basketball Cup, or French Federation Basketball Cup, (French: Coupe de France de Basket) is the annual national basketball federation cup competition of France. It is organized by the French Basketball Federation. It is also known as the Trophée Robert Busnel (Robert Busnel Trophy), named after the late basketball player Robert Busnel, who died in 1991.

A total of 54 amateur and professional teams from France, participate in the cup competition.

== History ==
- 1952–53 to 1968–69 French Cup (including professional clubs)*
- 1981–82 to 1984–85 Federation Cup
- 1992–93 to 1994–95 League Cup
- 1995–96 to present French Cup (including professional clubs)

*From 1971 to 1995, the French Cup was not contested by professional clubs.

== Title holders ==
- 1952–53 ASVEL
- 1953–54 PUC
- 1954–55 PUC
- 1955–56 Auboué
- 1956–57 ASVEL
- 1957–58 Étoile Charleville-Mézières
- 1958–59 Étoile Charleville-Mézières
- 1959–60 Denain Voltaire
- 1960–61 Stade Auto Lyon
- 1961–62 PUC
- 1962–63 PUC
- 1963–64 Moderne
- 1964–65 ASVEL
- 1965–66 Nantes
- 1966–67 ASVEL
- 1967–68 Not held
- 1968–69 JA Vichy
- 1969–70 JA Vichy
- 1970–81 Not held
- 1981–82 Limoges CSP
- 1982–83 Limoges CSP
- 1983–84 ASVEL
- 1984–85 Limoges CSP
- 1985–92 Not held
- 1992–93 JDA Dijon
- 1993–94 Limoges CSP
- 1994–95 Limoges CSP
- 1995–96 ASVEL
- 1996–97 ASVEL
- 1997–98 Cholet
- 1998–99 Cholet
- 1999–00 Limoges CSP
- 2000–01 ASVEL
- 2001–02 Pau-Orthez
- 2002–03 Pau-Orthez
- 2003–04 Le Mans Sarthe
- 2004–05 BCM Gravelines
- 2005–06 JDA Dijon
- 2006–07 Pau-Orthez
- 2007–08 ASVEL
- 2008–09 Le Mans Sarthe
- 2009–10 Orléans
- 2010–11 Élan Chalon
- 2011–12 Élan Chalon
- 2012–13 Paris-Levallois
- 2013–14 JSF Nanterre
- 2014–15 SIG
- 2015–16 Le Mans Sarthe
- 2016–17 Nanterre 92
- 2017–18 SIG
- 2018–19 ASVEL
- 2019–20 Not held
- 2020–21 ASVEL
- 2021–22 Pau-Orthez
- 2022–23 Monaco
- 2023–24 JDA Dijon
- 2024–25 Paris Basketball
- 2025–26 Monaco

== Finals ==
Year	Winner	Finalist	Score	Venue
French Cup
1953	ASVEL	Mulhouse	43–41	Paris (Vel d'Hiv)
1954	PUC	ASVEL	54–49	Paris (Vel d'Hiv)
1955	PUC	ASVEL	46–43	Roanne
1956	Auboué	Racing Club de France	63–52	Paris (Coubertin)
1957	ASVEL	PUC	61–55	Tours
1958	Étoile Charleville-Mézières	Denain Voltaire	79–42	Mulhouse
1959	Étoile Charleville-Mézières	ASVEL	72–65	Paris (Coubertin)
1960	Denain Voltaire	Auboué	67–66	Tours
1961	Stade Auto Lyon	PUC	64–55	Nantes
1962	PUC	RCM Toulouse	65–57	Rennes
1963	PUC	Alsace Bagnolet	75–64	Paris (Coubertin)
1964	Moderne	Chorale Mulsant	70–68	Tours
1965	ASVEL	Alsace Bagnolet	59–55	Mulhouse
1966	Nantes	Denain Voltaire	65–58	Lyon
1967	ASVEL	Denain Voltaire	88–82	Cholet
1968	The French Cup was replaced by the Regions' Cup			
1969	JA Vichy	Alsace Bagnolet	90–56	Tours
1970	JA Vichy	Moderne	78–74	Saint-Nazaire
From 1971 to 1995, the French Cup was not contested by professional clubs.
Federation Cup
1982	Limoges CSP	ASVEL	116–100	
1983	Limoges CSP	Monaco	96–81	
1984	ASVEL	Stade Français	88–87	
1985	Limoges CSP	Stade Français	88–87	
League Cup
1993	JDA Dijon	Racing Paris	101–66	85-87
1994	Limoges CSP	SIG	83-66	
1995	Limoges CSP	Pau-Orthez	84-83 (OT)	
French Cup
1996	ASVEL	Levallois	72–69	Marseille
1997	ASVEL	SLUC Nancy	67–58	Paris (Coubertin)
1998	Cholet	Levallois	95–54	Paris (Bercy)
1999	Cholet	SIG	85–70	Paris (Bercy)
2000	Limoges CSP	Racing Paris	79–73	Paris (Bercy)
2001	ASVEL	Pau-Orthez	99–74	Paris (Bercy)
2002	Pau-Orthez	ASVEL	80–73	Paris (Bercy)
2003	Pau-Orthez	BCM Gravelines	82–74	Paris (Bercy)
2004	Le Mans Sarthe	Pau-Orthez	83–80	Paris (Bercy)
2005	BCM Gravelines	Cholet	91–79	Paris (Bercy)
2006	JDA Dijon	Orléans	66–58	Paris (Bercy)
2007	Pau-Orthez	JSF Nanterre	92–83	Paris (Bercy)
2008	ASVEL	Cholet	86–76	Paris (Bercy)
2009	Le Mans Sarthe	SLUC Nancy	79–65	Paris (Bercy)
2010	Orléans	BCM Gravelines	73–69	Paris (Bercy)
2011	Élan Chalon	Limoges CSP	79–71	Paris (Bercy)
2012	Élan Chalon	Limoges CSP	83–75	Paris (Bercy)
2013	Paris-Levallois	JSF Nanterre	77–74	Paris (Bercy)
2014	JSF Nanterre	SLUC Nancy	55–50	Paris (Coubertin)
2015	SIG	ESSM Le Portel	87–74	Paris (Carpentier)
2016	Le Mans Sarthe	ASVEL	88–75	Paris (Carpentier)
2017	Nanterre 92	Le Mans Sarthe	96–79	Paris (Bercy)
2018	SIG	Boulazac Dordogne	82–62	Paris (Bercy)
2019	ASVEL	Le Mans Sarthe	70–61	Paris (Bercy)
2020	Cancelled due to the COVID-19 pandemic.			
2021	ASVEL	JDA Dijon	77–61	Paris (Bercy)
2022	Pau-Orthez	SIG Strasbourg	95–86	Paris (Bercy)
2023	Monaco	ASVEL	90–70	Paris (Bercy)
2024	JDA Dijon	SIG Strasbourg	83–70	Paris (Bercy)
2025	Paris Basketball	Le Mans Sarthe	91–80	Paris (Bercy)
2026	Monaco	Le Mans Sarthe	87–83	Paris (Bercy)

== French Cup (1982–1995) ==
Year	Winner	Finalist	Score
1982	CO Briochin	Denain Voltaire	81–79
1983	Challans	CRO Lyon	114–98
1984	Denain Voltaire	OS Hyères	75–85
1985	OS Hyères	Saint-Quentin	66–63
1986	RCM Toulouse	AS Tarare	95–84
1987	Saint-Quentin	Montpellier	102–86
1988	AS Esquennoy	Villeneuve-sur-Lot	86–79
1989	Nice BC	SIG	86–85
1990	Toulon	CRO Lyon	89–84
1991	EB Châlons-en-Champagne	USO Athis-Mons	107–83
1992	Anjou BC Angers	AS Poissy	82–70
1993	Besançon	Élan Chalon	79–64
1994	Anjou BC Angers	Gauloise Vitry le François	82–74
1995	Gauloise Vitry le François	Reims Champagne	73–69

== See also ==
- LNB Élite (French League)
- Leaders Cup (French League Cup)
- Match des Champions (French Supercup)
