= Basket CRO Lyon =

- Arena: Gymnase Roger Duplat
- Capacity: 500
- Location: Lyon, France
- President: Robert Chapuy
- Head coach: Clément Bénitah
- Championships: 2 French Leagues 2
- Website: Official site

Basket Croix Rousse Olympique Lyon is a French basketball club playing in 2016 at the Regional level male 2 Division. It is based in the city of Lyon.

== History ==
CRO Lyon experienced in elite (National 1A) of the championship of France in the 1970s and the early 1990s but stopped its activities (budget problems in 1996) before returning to lower levels. The club return to the top flight was possible thanks to financial support from Roger Caille, CEO of Jet Service, the club then called Jet Lyon.

== Honours ==
French League 2

- Winners (2): 1982–83, 1990–91

French U20 League

- Winners: 2015–16
- Finalists: 2016–17

== Notable players ==
- (France) Éric Beugnot
- (France) Richard Dacoury
- (France) Franck Mériguet
- (France) Régis Racine
- (France) Stéphane Risacher
- (France) Jimmy Vérove
- (United States) Michael Young
- (France) Christophe Soulé
- (Albania) James Nallbani

== Head coaches ==
- (France) Maurice Buffière (1974–77)
- (France) Jean-Michel Sénégal (1989–94)
- (France) Brigitte Coste (2006–07)
- (France) Johan Rat (2009–10)
- (France) Jean-Luc Réocreux (2010–12)
- (France) Johan Rat (2012–2014)
