= Hervé Dubuisson =

French basketball player (born 1957)

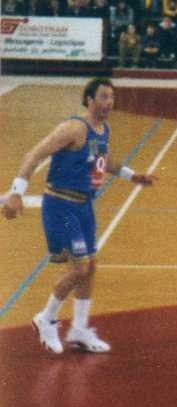
- Hervé Dubuisson in 1999

Personal information
- Born: 8 August 1957 (age 69) Douai, France
- Listed height: 6 ft 5.75 in (1.97 m)
- Listed weight: 210 lb (95 kg)

Career information
- Playing career: 1973–1999
- Position: Shooting guard / small forward
- Number: 6, 11
- Coaching career: 1996–2001

Career history

Playing
- 1973–1975: Denain Voltaire
- 1975–1980: Le Mans
- 1980–1982: Antibes
- 1982–1986: Stade Français
- 1986–1993: PSG Racing Basket
- 1993–1994: ASA Sceaux
- 1994–1995: Gravelines
- 1995–1996: Nancy
- 1996–1997, 1998–1999: Montpellier

Coaching
- 1996–1997: Montpellier
- 1997–1999: Antibes
- 1999–2001: SLUC Nancy

Career highlights
- As player: FIBA European Selection Team (1980); 2× French League champion (1978, 1979); French League French Player's MVP (1984); 4× French League All-Star (1987–1989, 1994); French League All-Star Game MVP (1994); French Championship All-Time Leading Scorer; French Basketball Hall of Fame (2004); French National Sports Hall of Fame (2012)
Medals
Men's basketball
Representing France
Mediterranean Games
Silver medal – second place	1975 Algeria

Hervé Dubuisson (born 8 August 1957) is a French former professional basketball player and coach. During his playing career, at a height of 1.97 m (6'5 3/4") tall, he played at the shooting guard and small forward positions. Dubuisson is the French Championship's all-time career leader in total points scored. He is also the senior French national team's all-time career leader in total points scored.

He was nicknamed "Monsieur Record" (English: "Mr. Record"), and "Le Blanc Qui Sautait Au-dessus Des Buildings" ("The White Man Who Jumps Above Buildings"). He was inducted into the French Basketball Hall of Fame in 2004. He was inducted into the French National Sports Hall of Fame in 2012.

== Early life ==
Dubuisson was born on 8 August 1957, in Douai, France. As a youth, he competed in the high jump and javelin throw, with the French athletics club L'Étoile Oignies (Pas-de-Calais). After that, he switched sports, and began playing youth basketball.

== Professional career ==
Dubuisson made his club debut in the European-wide third level competition, the FIBA Korać Cup, in 1973, at the age of 15, in a game against the Luxembourg League club Steesel. During his playing career, Dubuisson won two French League championships with Le Mans, in 1978 and 1979. He was named to the FIBA European Selection team in 1980, and he was named the French League French Player's MVP in 1984.

During his pro club career, Dubuisson scored at least 50 points in a single French League game, on five occasions. His career-high for most points scored in a single French League game, was 55 points scored in a game against ASPO Tours, in 1989. He ended his club playing career as the French League's all-time leader in career total points scored, with 19,013.

== National team career ==
Dubuisson made his debut with the senior French national team in 1974, at the age of 16. As a member of the senior French national team, Dubuisson competed at the men's basketball tournament, at the 1984 Los Angeles Summer Olympics. He also represented France at the 1986 FIBA World Championship. In addition to that, he also played with France at 7 FIBA EuroBasket tournaments.

He played at the following EuroBasket tournaments: the 1977 EuroBasket, the 1979 EuroBasket, the 1981 EuroBasket, the 1983 EuroBasket, the 1985 EuroBasket, the 1987 EuroBasket, and the 1989 EuroBasket. He retired from the senior French national team as its all-time career leader in both caps (games played) with 259, and in total points scored, with 3,916.

He also holds the senior French national team's all-time record for the most points scored in a single game. On 21 November 1985, Dubuisson scored 51 points, in a 1986 FIBA World Championship Qualification game against Greece.

== Coaching career ==
After he retired from playing pro basketball, Dubuisson worked as a basketball coach. He was the head coach of the French clubs Montpellier (1996–1997), Antibes (1997–1999), and SLUC Nancy (1999–2001).

== Personal life ==
Dubuisson was involved in a traffic accident on 10 May 2001. He was hit by a motorcycle near his home. As a result of the accident, he spent several months in a coma, and had two years of intensive rehab therapy. In 2005, he married the French-Bulgarian women's basketball player Madlena Staneva.

His biography, Hervé Dubuisson, a Life in Suspension, was published in October 2015. In 2017, a movie about Dubuisson was made. It is named The White Man Who Jumps Above Buildings. His nephew, Victor Dubuisson, is a professional golfer.

In 2024, Dubuisson was decorated with the Legion of Honour.
