= Paris Basket Racing =

Disbanded basketball club in France

- Founded: 1922; 104 years ago
- Dissolved: 2007; 19 years ago
- History: Racing Club de France Basket (1922–1989); Racing Paris Basket (1989–1992); PSG Racing Basket (1992–2000); Paris Basket Racing (2000–2007)
- Arena: Palais des sports Marcel-Cerdan; Stade Pierre de Coubertin
- Capacity: 4,000; 4,200
- Location: Paris, France
- Team colors: Blue, White
- Championships: 4 French League Championships; 4 French 2nd Division Championships
- Retired numbers: 1 (7)
Home	Away

Paris Basket Racing, or PBR, was a French professional basketball club from Paris. It was founded in 1922, as the basketball section of the multi-sports club Racing Club de France. The team took the name "Paris Basket Racing" in 2000. In 2007, the club merged with another club from the Paris area, Levallois Sporting Club Basket, to form the current version of the club, known first as Paris-Levallois Basket, and later as Metropolitans Basketball Club.

== History ==
Paris Basket Racing won three French national championships in the 1950s, in the 1950–51, 1952–53, and 1953–54 seasons, then won a French Pro A title in the 1996–97 season.

In 2007, the club merged with another club from the Paris area, Levallois Sporting Club Basket, to form the club's newest incarnation, Paris-Levallois Basket. After the merger, Paris-Levallois Basket retained all of the history of both Paris Basket Racing and Levallois Sporting Club Basket.

In 2025, there were numerous announcements that owners of football club PSG want to refound basketball section to join NBA Europe League project.

== Names of the club ==
- Racing Club de France Basket (R.C. France Basket): 1922–1989
- Racing Paris Basket: 1989–1992
- Paris Saint Germain Racing Basket (P.S.G. Racing Basket): 1992–2000
- Paris Basket Racing: 2000–2007

== Arenas ==
Paris Basket Racing played its home games at the 4,000 seat Palais des sports Marcel-Cerdan, and at the 4,200 seat Stade Pierre de Coubertin.

== Titles and honors ==
=== Domestic competitions ===
- French League
  - Champions (4): 1951, 1953, 1954, 1997
    - Runners-up (1): 1956
- French Federation Cup
  - Runners-up (3): 1956, 1993, 2000
- French Second Division
  - Champions (4): 1936, 1954, 1977, 1985

== Season by season ==
Season	Tier	League	Pos.	French Cup	European competitions	
1991–92	1	Pro A	11th		3 Korać Cup	QF
1992–93	1	Pro A	6th			
1993–94	1	Pro A	6th			
1994–95	1	Pro A	5th			
1995–96	1	Pro A	5th		3 Korać Cup	
1996–97	1	Pro A	1st			
1997–98	1	Pro A	5th		1 EuroLeague	R2
1998–99	1	Pro A	5th		3 Korać Cup	
1999–00	1	Pro A	6th			
2000–01	1	Pro A	8th		2 Saporta Cup	RS
2001–02	1	Pro A	7th		3 Korać Cup	RS
2002–03	1	Pro A	7th			
2003–04	1	Pro A	13th		3 Europe League	RS
2004–05	1	Pro A	4th		3 Europe League	EF
2005–06	1	Pro A	13th			
2006–07	1	Pro A	14th			

== Players ==
=== Retired numbers ===
Paris Racing Basket retired numbers
N°	Nat.	Player	Position	Years With Club
#7	(Socialist Federal Republic of Yugoslavia) - (France)	Marko Ostarčević	SG	1966–1983

=== Notable players ===
Note: Flags indicate national team eligibility at FIBA-sanctioned events. Players may hold other non-FIBA nationalities not displayed.

Criteria

To appear in this section a player must have either:

- Set a club record or won an individual award while at the club
- Played at least one official international match for their national team at any time
- Played at least one official NBA match at any time.

France:

- (France) Arsène Ade-Mensah
- (France) Yann Bonato
- (France) Robert Busnel
- (France) Richard Dacoury
- (France) Mamoutou Diarra
- (France) Hervé Dubuisson
- (France) Thierry Gadou
- (France) Philippe Hervé
- (France) Cyril Julian
- (France) Éric Micoud
- (France) Jacques Monclar
- (France) Robert Monclar
- (France) T. J. Parker
- (France) Tony Parker
- (France) Jean Perniceni
- (France) Stéphane Risacher
- (France) Thierry Rupert
- (France) Laurent Sciarra

USA:

- (United States) John Linehan
- (United States) Jerrod Mustaf
- (United States) J. R. Reid
- (United States) Larry Stewart
- (United States) Sedale Threatt

Europe:

- (Serbia) - (Austria) Nedeljko Ašćerić
- (Turkey) Yalçın Granit
- (Socialist Federal Republic of Yugoslavia) Dragan Kićanović
- (Federal Republic of Yugoslavia) Dejan Koturović
- (Federal Republic of Yugoslavia) Nikola Lončar
- (Israel) Erez Markovich
- (Israel) Robert Rothbart
- (Hungary) - (France) François Németh
- (Socialist Federal Republic of Yugoslavia) - (France) Marko Ostarčević
- (Federal Republic of Yugoslavia) Žarko Paspalj
- (Ukraine) Oleksiy Pecherov
- (Spain) Alfonso Reyes
- (Belgium) Eric Struelens
- (Lithuania) Mindaugas Timinskas
- (Turkey) Mirsad Türkcan
- (Slovenia) Jure Zdovc

Asia:

- (Japan) - (United States) J. R. Sakuragi

== Head coaches ==
- (France) Robert Busnel: (1949–1952)
- (France) Jean Perniceni: (1952–1954)
- (France) Robert Monclar: (1954–1959, 1965–1966)
- (France) Jacques Freimuller: (1959–1961)
- (France) Laurent Franchescini: (1961–1963, 1967–1968)
- (France) Edmond Gondal: (1969–1971)
- (France) Antoine Schneider & (France) Jacques Pocquet: (1971–1972)
- (France) Gérard de Félices: (1973–1974)
- (France) Gérard Mullon & (Socialist Federal Republic of Yugoslavia) - (France) Marko Ostarčević: (1977–1978)
- (France) Dominique Richard Laurent Dorigo: (1985–1986)
- (France) George Eddy & (France) André Buffière: (1986–1987)
- (France) Jean-Michel Sénégal: (1987–1989)
- (France) Laurent Dorigo: (1989)
- (France) George Fischer & (France) Grég Beugnot & (France) Laurent Bosc: (1989–1990)
- (France) Grég Beugnot: (1989–92)
- (United States) Chris Singleton: (1993–97)
- (France) Jacky Renaud & (France) Didier Dobbels: (1997)
- (Serbia) Božidar Maljković: (1997–98)
- (France) Erik Lehmann: (2001–02)
- (France) Jacques Monclar: (2002–05)
- (Canada) / (Finland) Gordon Herbert: (2005–06)
- (Greece) Ilias Zouros: (2006–07)

== See also ==
- Levallois Sporting Club Basket
- Metropolitans Basketball Club
