= ABC Nantes =

ABC Nantes (Amicale Basket Club de Nantes / in English: Nantes Friendly Basketball Club) or Nantes was a French professional basketball team located in the city of Nantes. Now, the club has dissolved. The position regarding the interest of basketball fans has gotten to Hermine de Nantes Atlantique which involved in LNB Pro B of the French basketball league.

== History ==
Nantes Atlantique was owned for 18 seasons in the elite division of France (between 1953 and 1991) with a review of 145 wins, 9 draws and 190 defeats in 344 games.

== Honours ==
French Cup (1): 1965-66

French League 2 (1): 1970-71

== Notable players ==
- (France) Michel Le Ray
- (France) Louis Bertorelle
- (France) Raphaël Ruiz
- (United States) Carmine Calzonetti
- (France) Patrick Barrett
- (United States) Vincent Schafmeister
- (France) Marc Cléro
- (France) Patrick Petit
- (United States) Leroy Johnson
- (France) Derrick Pope
- (United States) Andy Fields
- (United States) George Montgomery
- (United States) Larry Boston

== Head coaches ==
Henri Manhe was a legend figure of the club. He coached Garennes and ASPTT Nantes particular, each with beautiful mounted elite with little means. Died in August 2007, it leaves its mark on the Breton basketball forever. Today, his grand-son Rodolphe resumed his legacy and his talent.

- 1953-55 (Soviet Union) Robert Perkons
- 1956-59 (France) Yvan Gominon
- 1959-62 (Socialist Federal Republic of Yugoslavia) Serge Kalember
- 1962-69 (France) Raphaël Ruiz
- 1969-73 (France) Christian Bayer
- 1974-75 (United States) Carmine Calzonetti
