= Denain Voltaire Basket =

Professional BasketBall Club

- Nickname: Les Dragons
- Leagues: Pro B
- Founded: 1947; 79 years ago
- Arena: Salle Jean Degros
- Capacity: 2,500
- Location: Denain, France
- Head coach: Thomas Andrieux
- Championships: 1 French League; 2 French Cups; 1 French Second League; 1 Pro B Leaders Cup
- Website: www.denainvoltairehainaut-basket.fr/wp2016/
Home	Away

Denain Voltaire Basket is a French professional basketball club that was founded in 1947, and is based in Denain, France. The club plays in the LNB Pro B, which is the second-tier level pro competition in France.

== History ==
The small club of the Voltaire school, moved up the French basketball hierarchy, until it reached the French basketball elite level in 1960, when it won the French Cup title. Five years later, the club won the top-level French League championship, with several players that had previously been Voltaire schoolchildren. In the late 1970s, the club gradually disappeared from the major French basketball landscape, before it began to once again climb up the French basketball ladder, and made it up to the French 2nd Division, for the 2011–12 season.

== Honours ==
French League

- Winners (1): 1964–65

French Cup

- Winners (2): 1959–60, 1983–84 (amateur)

French Second League

- Winners (1): 1959–60, 1963–64

Pro B Leaders Cup

- Winners (1): 2017–18

== Season by season ==
Season	Tier	League	Pos.	French Cup	Other competitions
2011–12	2	Pro B	6th		
2012–13	2	Pro B	14th		
2013–14	2	Pro B	11th		
2014–15	2	Pro B	3rd		
2015–16	2	Pro B	13th		
2016–17	2	Pro B	12th		

== Current roster ==
Note: Flags indicate national team eligibility at FIBA-sanctioned events. Players may hold other non-FIBA nationalities not displayed.

Denain Voltaire Basket roster
Players
Coaches

Pos.	No.	Nat.	Name
PG	1	(France)	Matthieu Missonnier
G/F	5	(France)	Dimitri Radnic
G/F	8	(France)	Babacar Niasse
SG	12	(Sweden)	Johan Lofberg
F	13	(United States)	Brandon Edwards
F	23	(United States)	Chuba Ohams
F/C	30	(Republic of the Congo)	Earvine Bassoumba
G/F	32	(France)	Kevin Marsillon-Noleo
PF	57	(France)	Soriah Bangura

Head coach

(Sweden) Kenny Grant

Assistant coach(es)

(France) Quentin Wadoux

Legend

- (C) Team captain
- Injured

- Roster
Updated: 16 October 2022

== Notable players ==
Note: Flags indicate national team eligibility at FIBA-sanctioned events. Players may hold other non-FIBA nationalities not displayed.

Criteria

To appear in this section a player must have either:

- Set a club record or won an individual award while at the club
- Played at least one official international match for their national team at any time
- Played at least one official NBA match at any time.

- (France) Hervé Dubuisson
- (France) Isaia Cordinier
- (France) Pierre Galle
- (France) Yakuba Ouattara
- (Iceland) Kristófer Acox
- (Iceland) Elvar Már Friðriksson
