= HTV Basket =

HTV
- Nickname: HTV
- Leagues: LNB Pro B
- Founded: 1990; 36 years ago
- Arena: Palais des Sports de Toulon
- Capacity: 4,700
- Location: Hyères and Toulon, France
- Team colors: Yellow and Navy
- President: Christian Giannini
- Team manager: Philippe Legname
- Head coach: Thalien Kevin
Home	Away

Hyères-Toulon Var Basket, also referred to as simply Hyères-Toulon or HTV, is a basketball club based in Hyères and Toulon, France.

Created by the merger of Omni Sport Hyerois and Club Sportif Toulonnais, the club shares its home games between the Espace 3000 in Hyères and the Palais des Sports in Toulon.

After several years in the LNB Pro A and LNB Pro B, the professional section of the club was dissolved in 2018.

== History ==
Hyères-Toulon was promoted to the Pro A as the regular season champion of the 2015–16 LNB Pro B season. In the 2016–17 Pro A season, the club ended 15th in the standings which was enough to avoid relegation. In the 2017–18 season, HTV ended last in the standings with only 6 wins. This meant relegation back to the Pro B for the club. Because of financial problems, the club is forced to dissolve the professional section of the club. It sells its professional licence to newly established Paris Basketball.

== Honours ==
LNB Pro B

- Champions (1): 2015–16

== Season by season ==
Season	Tier	League	Pos.	French Cup	European competitions	
2006–07	1	Pro A	15th			
2007–08	1	Pro A	8th			
2008–09	1	Pro A	11th		3 EuroChallenge	RS
2009–10	1	Pro A	11th			
2010–11	1	Pro A	7th			
2011–12	1	Pro A	16th			
2012–13	2	Pro B	12th			
2013–14	2	Pro B	9th	Semifinalist		
2014–15	2	Pro B	5th			
2015–16	2	Pro B	1st			
2016–17	1	Pro A	15th			
2017–18	1	Pro A	18th (Note: The professional section of the club was dissolved and professional licence was sold.)			

== See also ==
- Category:HTV Basket players
