= Eurocup 2013–14 Regular Season Group A =

Standings and Results for Group A of the Regular Season phase of the 2013–14 Eurocup basketball tournament.

== Standings ==
	Team	Pld	W	L	PF	PA	Diff	Tie-break
1.	(Italy) FoxTown Cantù	10	8	2	832	746	+86	1–1 (+23)
2.	(Belgium) Telenet Oostende	10	8	2	768	752	+16	1–1 (–23)
3.	(Czech Republic) ČEZ Nymburk	10	6	4	789	736	+53	
4.	(France) Le Mans Sarthe	10	5	5	719	718	+1	
5.	(Germany) Artland Dragons	10	2	8	721	820	–99	
6.	(Croatia) Cibona Zagreb	10	1	9	770	827	–57	

== Fixtures and results ==
=== Game 1 ===
16 October 2013
18:00 CET

Boxscore

Cibona Zagreb (Croatia)	76–78	(France) Le Mans Sarthe
Scoring by quarter: 17–23, 16–21, 17–21, 26–13
Pts: Janning 19; Rebs: Žižić 12; Asts: Šarić 4		Pts: Wood 22; Rebs: Issa 10; Asts: Sy 8

Dražen Petrović Basketball Hall, Zagreb
Attendance: 1,000
Referees: Murat Biricik (TUR), Oscar Perea (ESP), Markos Michaelides (SUI)

16 October 2013
20:30 CET

Boxscore

Telenet Oostende (Belgium)	90–83	(Czech Republic) ČEZ Nymburk
Scoring by quarter: 13–17, 19–22, 19–20, 25–24
Pts: Stipanović, Thompson 19; Rebs: Berggren, Stipanović 6 Asts: Marnegraeve 10		Pts: Mahalbašić 16; Rebs: Mahalbašić 8 Asts: Reynolds 6

Sleuyter Arena, Ostend
Attendance: 2,300
Referees: Jose Martin (ESP), Oskars Lucis (LAT), Regis Bardera (FRA)

16 October 2013
20:30 CET

Boxscore

FoxTown Cantù (Italy)	88–86	(Germany) Artland Dragons
Scoring by quarter: 8–16, 24–23, 29–20, 27–27
Pts: Aradori 28; Rebs: Aradori 6 Asts: Leunen 4		Pts: King 19; Rebs: King 10; Asts: Graves 6

Palasport Pianella, Cantù
Attendance: 2,041
Referees: Antonio Conde (ESP), Nicola Maestre (FRA), Haris Bijedic (BIH)

=== Game 2 ===
23 October 2013
18:00 CET

Boxscore

ČEZ Nymburk (Czech Republic)	84–76	(Croatia) Cibona Zagreb
Scoring by quarter: 20–20, 21–15, 17–24, 26–17
Pts: Mahalbašić 25; Rebs: Mahalbašić 6 Asts: Reynolds 8		Pts: Strawberry 18; Rebs: Rozić 9 Asts: Blassingame 11

Sportovní Centrum, Nymburk
Attendance: 950
Referees: Joseph Bissang (FRA), Marcin Kowalski (POL), Aleksandar Milojevic (MKD)

23 October 2013
19:30 CET

Boxscore

Artland Dragons (Germany)	69–84	(Belgium) Telenet Oostende
Scoring by quarter: 12–25, 14–14, 28–28, 15–17
Pts: Hill 16; Rebs: Töpper 7 Asts: Four players 2		Pts: Stipanović 20; Rebs: Stipanović 6 Asts: Djordjević 13

Artland-Arena, Quakenbrück
Attendance: 1,203
Referees: Juan Carlos Garcia Gonzales (ESP), Petar Obradovic (BIH), Aare Halliko (EST)

23 October 2013
20:30 CET

Boxscore

Le Mans Sarthe (France)	65–77	(Italy) FoxTown Cantù
Scoring by quarter: 16–18, 13–19, 14–20, 22–20
Pts: Batista 14; Rebs: Sy 5 Asts: Eito 6		Pts: Ragland 23; Rebs: Uter 8 Asts: Jenkins 4

Antarès, Le Mans
Attendance: 5,450
Referees: Dani Hierrezuelo (ESP), Miguel Angel Perez Niz (ESP), Sergio Silva (POR)

=== Game 3 ===
30 October 2013
18:00 CET

Boxscore

Cibona Zagreb (Croatia)	77–87	(Germany) Artland Dragons
Scoring by quarter: 20–27, 14–24, 26–26, 17–10
Pts: Šarić 20; Rebs: three players 5 Asts: three players 4		Pts: King 19; Rebs: Hill 8 Asts: Holston 5

Dražen Petrović Basketball Hall, Zagreb
Attendance: 1,500
Referees: Jose Martin (ESP), Saverio Lanzarini (ITA), Ilya Puteno (RUS)

30 October 2013
20:30 CET

Boxscore

Le Mans Sarthe (France)	81–74 (OT)	(Czech Republic) ČEZ Nymburk
Scoring by quarter: 15–17, 15–15, 18–13, 21–24, Overtime: 12–5
Pts: Wood 30; Rebs: Duggins, Issa 7 Asts: Sy 4		Pts: Rančík, Simmons 21; Rebs: Rančík, Simmons 7 Asts: Simmons 5

Antarès, Le Mans
Attendance: 3,750
Referees: Tomas Jasevicius (LTU), Carlos Peruga (POR), Gintaras Vitkauskas (LTU)

30 October 2013
20:30 CET

Boxscore

FoxTown Cantù (Italy)	83–58	(Belgium) Telenet Oostende
Scoring by quarter: 32–11, 16–23, 14–13, 21–11
Pts: Jenkins 22; Rebs: Cusin 9 Asts: Ragland 8		Pts: Stipanović 11; Rebs: Stipanović 10; Asts: Petrović 4

Palasport Pianella, Cantù
Attendance: 2,245
Referees: Vicente Bulto (ESP), Aleksandar Glisic (SRB), Jasmina Juras (SRB)

=== Game 4 ===
5 November 2013
19:30 CET

Boxscore

Artland Dragons (Germany)	67–79	(France) Le Mans Sarthe
Scoring by quarter: 14–32, 21–18, 11–12, 21–17
Pts: Grünheid 11; Rebs: King, Wenzl 6 Asts: Doreth 8		Pts: Wood 19; Rebs: Terry 8 Asts: Wood 6

Artland-Arena, Quakenbrück
Attendance: 1,280
Referees: Ilija Belosevic (SRB), Carlos Cortes (ESP), Igor Dragojevic (MNE)

6 November 2013
20:30 CET

Boxscore

FoxTown Cantù (Italy)	88–73	(Czech Republic) ČEZ Nymburk
Scoring by quarter: 22–18, 26–19, 22–17, 18–19
Pts: Ragland 19; Rebs: Leunen, Ragland 6 Asts: Ragland 7		Pts: Page 16; Rebs: Mahalbašić, Rančík 6 Asts: Hruban, Page 4

Palasport Pianella, Cantù
Attendance: 2,028
Referees: Juan Carlos Arteaga (ESP), Renaud Geller (FRA), Tomislav Hordov (CRO)

6 November 2013
20:30 CET

Boxscore

Telenet Oostende (Belgium)	77–75	(Croatia) Cibona Zagreb
Scoring by quarter: 15–20, 26–11, 20–28, 16–16
Pts: Thompson 15; Rebs: Berggren 6 Asts: Marnegraeve 5		Pts: Blassingame 21; Rebs: Šarić 9 Asts: Blassingame 5

Sleuyter Arena, Ostend
Attendance: 2,455
Referees: Roberto Chiari (ITA), Benjamin Jimenez (ESP), Mario Majkic (SLO)

=== Game 5 ===
12 November 2013
18:30 CET

Boxscore

ČEZ Nymburk (Czech Republic)	86–70	(Germany) Artland Dragons
Scoring by quarter: 20–23, 23–8, 11–17, 32–22
Pts: Page 24; Rebs: Page, Rančík 7 Asts: Welsch 11		Pts: Thomas, Wenzl 16; Rebs: Hill, Wenzl 5 Asts: three players 3

Sportovní Centrum, Nymburk
Attendance: 880
Referees: Spiros Gkontas (GRE), Uros Obrknezevic (SRB), Josip Radojkovic (CRO)

13 November 2013
18:00 CET

Boxscore

Cibona Zagreb (Croatia)	79–86	(Italy) FoxTown Cantù
Scoring by quarter: 16–30, 26–18, 18–22, 19–16
Pts: Janning 18; Rebs: Šarić 7 Asts: Blassingame 7		Pts: Aradori 20; Rebs: Leunen 7 Asts: Aradori 6

Dražen Petrović Basketball Hall, Zagreb
Attendance: 1,500
Referees: Jose Ramon Garcia Ortiz (ESP), Eddie Viator (FRA), Nick Van Den Broeck (BEL)

13 November 2013
20:30 CET

Boxscore

Le Mans Sarthe (France)	71–80	(Belgium) Telenet Oostende
Scoring by quarter: 19–26, 14–19, 16–16, 22–19
Pts: Wood 17; Rebs: Koffi 5 Asts: Wood, Duggins 4		Pts: Thompson 25; Rebs: Stipanović, Djordjević 6 Asts: Thompson 6

Antarès, Le Mans
Attendance: 3,500
Referees: Miguel Perez Perez (ESP), Apostolos Kalpakas (SWE), Francisco Arana (ESP)

=== Game 6 ===
20 November 2013
18:30 CET

Boxscore

ČEZ Nymburk (Czech Republic)	73–51	(Belgium) Telenet Oostende
Scoring by quarter: 20–15, 16–14, 18–5, 19–17
Pts: Mahalbašić 15; Rebs: Mahalbašić 9 Asts: Ilievski 7		Pts: Ponitka 18; Rebs: Stipanović 8 Asts: Djordjević 2

Sportovní Centrum, Nymburk
Attendance: 1,450
Referees: Grzegorz Ziemblicki (POL), Saso Petek (SLO), Ilya Putenko (RUS)

20 November 2013
19:30 CET

Boxscore

Artland Dragons (Germany)	68–81	(Italy) FoxTown Cantù
Scoring by quarter: 26–30, 16–21, 16–12, 10–18
Pts: Thomas 13; Rebs: Holston, Hill 5 Asts: Holston 7		Pts: Aradori 29; Rebs: Leunen 6 Asts: Ragland 7

Artland-Arena, Quakenbrück
Attendance: 1,050
Referees: Matej Boltauzer (SLO), Joseph Bissang (FRA), Alexey Davydov (RUS)

20 November 2013
20:30 CET

Boxscore

Le Mans Sarthe (France)	53–64	(Croatia) Cibona Zagreb
Scoring by quarter: 3–16, 20–13, 10–23, 20–12
Pts: Terry, Wood 18; Rebs: Koffi 8 Asts: Duggins 3		Pts: Žižić 21; Rebs: Blassingame, Šarić 8 Asts: Blassingame 5

Antarès, Le Mans
Attendance: 4,300
Referees: Vicente Bulto (ESP), Jasmina Juras (SRB), Clements Fritz (GER)

=== Game 7 ===
27 November 2013
18:00 CET

Boxscore

Cibona Zagreb (Croatia)	77–84	(Czech Republic) ČEZ Nymburk
Scoring by quarter: 7–13, 13–23, 20–22, 37–26
Pts: Kus 22; Rebs: Planinić, Šarić 6 Asts: Janning 6		Pts: Simmons 24; Rebs: Mahalbašić 7 Asts: Simmons 6

Dražen Petrović Basketball Hall, Zagreb
Attendance: 1,000
Referees: Murat Biricik (TUR), Sergiy Chebyshev (UKR), Saverio Lanzarini (ITA)

27 November 2013
20:30 CET

Boxscore

Telenet Oostende (Belgium)	87–71	(Germany) Artland Dragons
Scoring by quarter: 21–16, 18–14, 26–17, 22–24
Pts: Stipanović 20; Rebs: Stipanović 8 Asts: Five players 3		Pts: Thomas 19; Rebs: Three players 5 Asts: Graves 4

Sleuyter Arena, Ostend
Attendance: 1,738
Referees: Vicente Bulto (ESP), Regis Bardera (FRA), Haris Bijedic (BIH)

27 November 2013
20:30 CET

Boxscore

FoxTown Cantù (Italy)	88–86 (OT)	(France) Le Mans Sarthe
Scoring by quarter: 23–13, 18–25, 20–13, 16–26, Overtime: 11–9
Pts: Ragland 23; Rebs: Cusin 8 Asts: Leunen 4		Pts: Duggins 16; Rebs: Kahudi 8 Asts: Kahudi, Duggins 4

Palasport Pianella, Cantù
Attendance: 2,253
Referees: Recep Ankarali (TUR), Panagiotis Anastopoulos (GRE), Gentian Cici (ALB)

=== Game 8 ===
4 December 2013
18:00 CET

Boxscore

ČEZ Nymburk (Czech Republic)	69–71	(France) Le Mans Sarthe
Scoring by quarter: 17–19, 16–21, 15–9, 21–22
Pts: Rančík 19; Rebs: Simmons 9 Asts: Ilievski, Welsch 4		Pts: Terry 16; Rebs: Sy 7 Asts: Duggins 5

Sportovní Centrum, Nymburk
Attendance: 950
Referees: Antonio Conde (ESP), Damir Javor (SLO), Miroslav Tomov (BUL)

4 December 2013
19:30 CET

Boxscore

Artland Dragons (Germany)	101–96	(Croatia) Cibona Zagreb
Scoring by quarter: 23–23, 33–24, 26–24, 19–25
Pts: Thomas 27; Rebs: five players 4 Asts: Holston 8		Pts: Žižić 27; Rebs: Žižić 11; Asts: Blassingame 8

Artland-Arena, Quakenbrück
Attendance: 838
Referees: Paolo Taurino (ITA), Sergiy Zashchuk (UKR), Gintaras Vitkauskas (LAT)

4 December 2013
20:30 CET

Boxscore

Telenet Oostende (Belgium)	77–75	(Italy) FoxTown Cantù
Scoring by quarter: 22–16, 24–24, 13–13, 18–22
Pts: Berggren 24; Rebs: three players 6 Asts: Marnegraeve 5		Pts: Jenkins 20; Rebs: Cusin 8 Asts: Ragland 4

Sleuyter Arena, Ostend
Attendance: 1,523
Referees: Spiros Gkontas (GRE), Sergiy Chebyshev (UKR), David Romano (ISR)

=== Game 9 ===
11 December 2013
18:00 CET

Boxscore

Cibona Zagreb (Croatia)	82–85	(Belgium) Telenet Oostende
Scoring by quarter: 20–30, 27–24, 18–11, 17–20
Pts: Jagodić-Kuridža 20; Rebs: Šarić 13; Asts: Blassingame 7		Pts: Thompson 18; Rebs: Ponitka 6 Asts: Djordjević, Serron 4

Dražen Petrović Basketball Hall, Zagreb
Attendance: 1,000
Referees: Marcin Kowalski (POL), Ioannis Foufis (GRE), Alexandru Olaru (ROM)

11 December 2013
18:30 CET

Boxscore

ČEZ Nymburk (Czech Republic)	86–74	(Italy) FoxTown Cantù
Scoring by quarter: 23–16, 17–20, 26–18, 20–20
Pts: Mahalbašić 21; Rebs: Mahalbašić 9 Asts: Simmons 9		Pts: Uter 17; Rebs: three players 5 Asts: Ragland 5

Sportovní Centrum, Nymburk
Attendance: 1,940
Referees: Vicente Bulto (ESP), Marius Ciulin (ROM), Haris Bijedic (BIH)

11 December 2013
20:30 CET

Boxscore

Le Mans Sarthe (France)	65–44	(Germany) Artland Dragons
Scoring by quarter: 11–11, 22–7, 19–12, 13–14
Pts: Batista 15; Rebs: Issa 7 Asts: Thomas 5		Pts: Frease 10; Rebs: Hill, Frease 8 Asts: Graves 3

Antarès, Le Mans
Attendance: 5,200
Referees: Francisco Araña (ESP), Renaud Geller (BEL), Ingus Baumanis (LAT)

=== Game 10 ===
18 December 2013
19:30 CET

Boxscore

Artland Dragons (Germany)	58–77	(Czech Republic) ČEZ Nymburk
Scoring by quarter: 10–20, 15–26, 19–12, 14–19
Pts: King 13; Rebs: King 6 Asts: Doreth 3		Pts: Rančík 20; Rebs: Mahalbašić 9 Asts: Ilievski 8

Artland-Arena, Quakenbrück
Attendance: 846
Referees: Matej Boltauzer (SLO), Juan Carlos Garcia Gonzalez (ESP), Alexey Davydov (RUS)

18 December 2013
20:30 CET

Boxscore

FoxTown Cantù (Italy)	92–68	(Croatia) Cibona Zagreb
Scoring by quarter: 22–23, 31–14, 21–13, 18–18
Pts: Leunen 18; Rebs: Uter 10; Asts: Aradori 5		Pts: Šarić 22; Rebs: Šarić 12; Asts: Blassingame 4

Palasport Pianella, Cantù
Attendance: 2,473
Referees: Andrej Lovsin (SLO), Renaud Geller (BEL), Nick van den Broeck (BEL)

18 December 2013
20:30 CET

Boxscore

Telenet Oostende (Belgium)	79–70	(France) Le Mans Sarthe
Scoring by quarter: 23–17, 20–24, 13–17, 23–12
Pts: Salumu 13; Rebs: Gillet 9 Asts: Marnegraeve 8		Pts: Batista, Duggins 14; Rebs: Issa, Terry 6 Asts: Thomas 4

Sleuyter Arena, Ostend
Attendance: 1,835
Referees: Luis Lopes (POR), Marek Cmikiewicz (POL), Jurgis Laurinavicius (LTU)
