= 2019–20 ASVEL Basket season =

ASVEL
2019–20 season
- Owner: Tony Parker
- President: Tony Parker
- Head coach: Zvezdan Mitrović
- Arena: Astroballe
- Pro A: Scheduled
- EuroLeague: Scheduled
- French Cup: TBD
Home	Away	EuroLeague
- All statistics correct as of 4 July 2019.

The 2019–20 ASVEL Basket season was the 71st season in the existence of the club. The club played in the LNB Pro A and in the EuroLeague for the first time in 9 years.

It was the second season under head coach Zvezdan Mitrović.

== Players ==
=== Squad information ===
LDLC ASVEL roster
Players
Coaches

Pos.	No.	Nat.	Name	Ht.	Wt.	Age
SG	1	(United States)	Berry, Davion	1.93 m (6 ft 4 in)	84 kg (185 lb)	34 – 1 November 1991
PG	2	(United States)	Taylor, Jordan	1.85 m (6 ft 1 in)	88 kg (194 lb)	36 – 30 September 1989
C	3	(Nigeria)	Jekiri, Tonye	2.13 m (7 ft 0 in)	103 kg (227 lb)	32 – 23 July 1994
SF	5	(France)	Kahudi, Charles	1.99 m (6 ft 6 in)	100 kg (220 lb)	40 – 19 July 1986
PG	6	(France)	Maledon, Théo	1.92 m (6 ft 4 in)	79 kg (174 lb)	25 – 12 June 2001
SG	9	(Latvia)	Lomažs, Rihards	1.91 m (6 ft 3 in)	81 kg (179 lb)	30 – 13 April 1996
SF	11	(France)	Galliou, Charles	2.02 m (6 ft 8 in)		30 – 26 December 1995
PF	12	(France)	Noua, Amine	2.02 m (6 ft 8 in)		29 – 7 February 1997
PF	17	(France)	Jean-Charles, Livio	2.06 m (6 ft 9 in)	98 kg (216 lb)	32 – 8 November 1993
G	19	(France)	Diot, Antoine	1.93 m (6 ft 4 in)	86 kg (190 lb)	37 – 17 January 1989
C	21	(Belgium)	Bako, Ismaël	2.08 m (6 ft 10 in)	98 kg (216 lb)	30 – 10 October 1995
G/F	23	(United States)	Lighty, David	1.96 m (6 ft 5 in)	98 kg (216 lb)	38 – 27 May 1988
PF	28	(France)	Yabusele, Guerschon	2.03 m (6 ft 8 in)	118 kg (260 lb)	30 – 17 December 1995
PG	32	(France)	Strazel, Matthew	1.82 m (6 ft 0 in)		24 – 5 August 2002
C	33	(United States)	Payne, Adreian	2.08 m (6 ft 10 in)	108 kg (238 lb)	35 – 19 February 1991

Head coach

- (Montenegro) Zvezdan Mitrović

Assistant coach(es)

- (France) T.J. Parker
- (France) Joseph Gomis

Legend

- (C) Team captain
- Injured

- Roster
- Transactions
Updated: 25 February 2020

=== Depth chart ===
Pos.	Starting 5	Bench 1	Bench 2
C	Tonye Jekiri	Adreian Payne	Ismaël Bako
PF	Livio Jean-Charles	Guerschon Yabusele	Amine Noua
SF	Charles Kahudi	David Lighty	Charles Galliou
SG	Théo Maledon	Davion Berry	Rihards Lomažs
PG	Jordan Taylor	Antoine Diot	Matthew Strazel

=== Transactions ===
==== In ====
Pos.	#	Player	Moving from	Date	Ref.
PG		(France) Edwin Jackson	(Montenegro) Budućnost	26 June 2019	
PG		(United States) Jordan Taylor	(France) Limoges	2 July 2019	
C		(Nigeria) Tonye Jekiri	(Turkey) Gaziantep	3 July 2019	
C		(Belgium) Ismaël Bako	(Belgium) Antwerp Giants	3 July 2019	
G		(Latvia) Rihards Lomažs	(Latvia) Ventspils	4 July 2019	

==== Out ====
Pos.	#	Player	Moving to	Date	Ref.
G		(United States) A.J. Slaughter	(Spain) Real Betis	1 July 2019	
G	5	(Lithuania) Mantas Kalnietis	End of contract	1 July 2019	
