= 2018–19 French Basketball Cup =

- Season: 2018–19
- Duration: 18 September 2018 – 11 May 2019
- Teams: 28

Finals
- Champions: ASVEL
- Runners-up: Le Mans

Awards
- Final MVP: (France) Théo Maledon

The 2018–19 French Basketball Cup season (French: 2018–19 Coupe de France de Basket) was the 42nd season of the domestic cup competition of French basketball.The previous winner of the cup was SIG Strasbourg. The competition started on 18 September 2018 and ended 11 May 2019. ASVEL Villeurbanne won the competition.

== Bracket ==
Round of 16; 11 February
RMB | 77
BC Souffelweyersheim | 71
SLUC Nancy | 52
Antibes Sharks | 65
AS Monaco | 62
Limoges CSP | 59
SIG Strasbourg | 78
ASVEL | 86
Le Mans | 97
Boulazac | 81
Élan Chalon | 72
Dijon | 85
Nanterre 92 | 89
Gries Oberhoffen | 70
JA Vichy | 78
Levallois Metropolitans | 80

Quarterfinals; 16 March
RMB | 93
Antibes Sharks | 86
AS Monaco | 87
ASVEL | 101
Le Mans | 95
Dijon | 87
Nanterre 92 | 80
Levallois Metropolitans | 84

Semifinals; 17 March
RMB | 81
ASVEL | 90
Le Mans | 94
Levallois Metropolitans | 81

Final; 11 May
ASVEL | 70
Le Mans | 61

== Final ==
| 11 May 2019 | Le Mans | 61–70 | ASVEL | Paris |
| 19:00 (CET) | Scoring by quarter: 22–18, 13–8, 14–23, 12–21 |
| | Pts: Thompson 14; Rebs: Yeguete 14; Asts: Eito 3 | Boxscore | Pts: Maledon 13; Rebs: Jean-Charles 12; Asts: Kalnietis 5 | Arena: Accor Arena |

== See also ==
- 2018–19 Pro A season
