= Dounia Issa =

French basketball player and coach (born 1981)

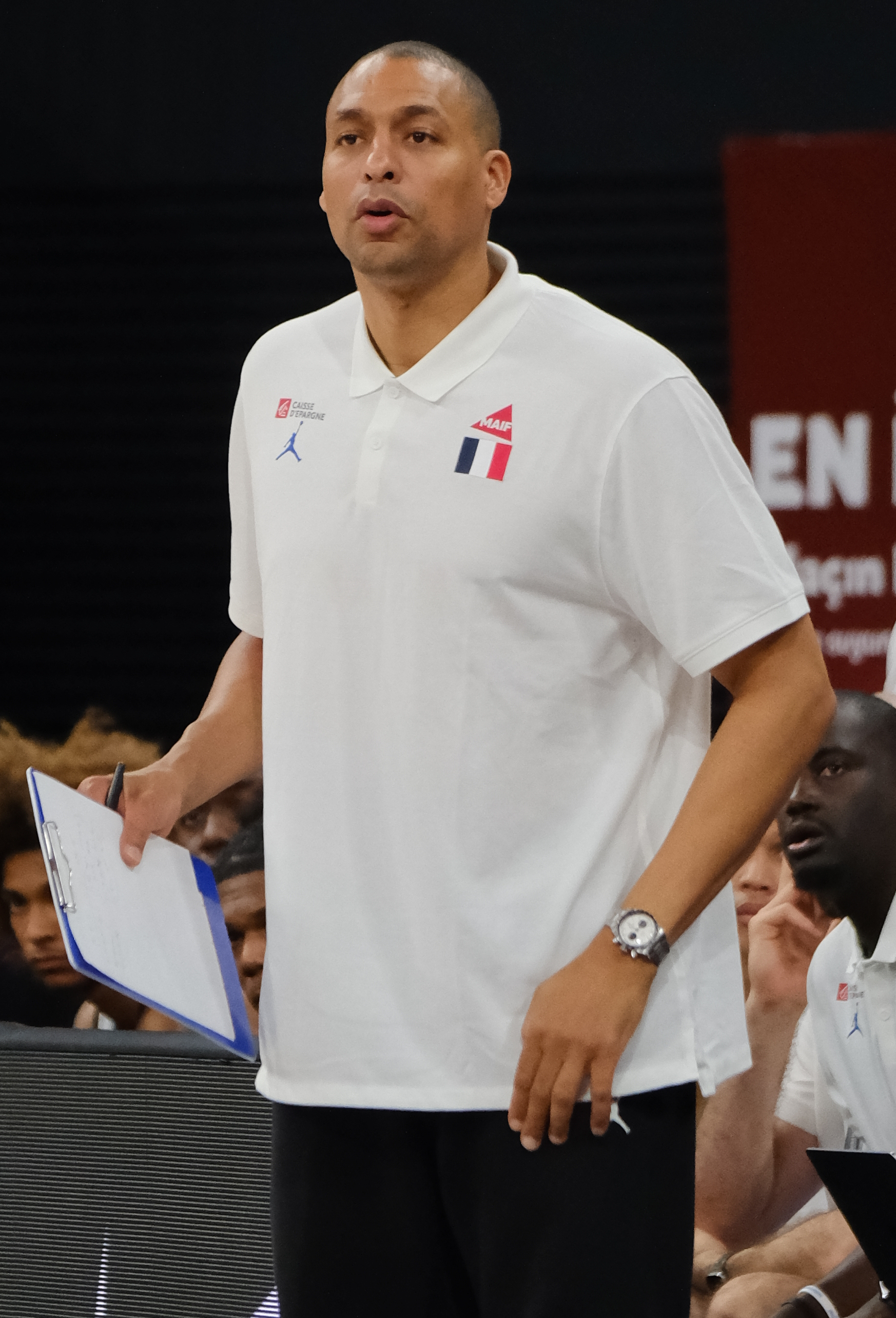

LDLC ASVEL
- Title: Assistant coach
- League: LNB Élite; EuroLeague

Personal information
- Born: June 3, 1981 (age 45) Toulouse, France
- Listed height: 6 ft 6 in (1.98 m)

Career information
- College: Toulouse Spacers
- NBA draft: 2003: undrafted
- Playing career: 2001–2016
- Position: Power forward

Career history

Playing
- 2001–2007: Stade Clermontois
- 2007–2010: JA Vichy
- 2010–2012: BCM Gravelines
- 2012–2016: Le Mans

Coaching
- 2016–2019: Le Mans (assistant)
- 2019: Le Mans
- 2021–2024: Pont-de-Chéruy
- 2024–2026: JA Vichy
- 2026–present: ASVEL (assistant)

Career highlights
- As player: French Cup winner (2016); 2× Leaders Cup winner (2011, 2014); Pro A Best Defender (2008); Pro A All-Star (2010); Pro B champion (2004); NM1 champion (2002)

Dounia Issa (born 3 June 1981) is a French professional basketball coach and former player who currently serves as the assistant coach for LDLC ASVEL of the French LNB Élite and the EuroLeague. Issa was a member of the French national squad at the EuroBasket 2009 qualification.
