= Antoine Eito =

French basketball player

Antoine Eïto
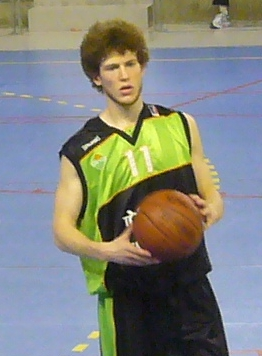

No. 8 – Boulazac Basket Dordogne
- Position: Point guard
- League: Betclic ÉLITE

Personal information
- Born: April 6, 1988 (age 38) Barbezieux, France
- Listed height: 6 ft 1 in (1.85 m)
- Listed weight: 183 lb (83 kg)

Career information
- NBA draft: 2010: undrafted
- Playing career: 2005–present

Career history
- 2005–2006: Cognac
- 2006–2009: ASVEL
- 2009–2012: Vichy
- 2012: Le Mans Sarthe
- 2012–2013: Orléans
- 2013–2015: Le Mans Sarthe
- 2015–2017: Orléans
- 2017–2021: Le Mans Sarthe
- 2021–2024: Élan Chalon
- 2024–2025: Sharks Antibes
- 2025–2026: Boulazac Basket Dordogne

Career highlights
- Leaders Cup winner (2015); Pro A champion (2009, 2018); French Cup winner (2008); French National 3x3 Champion (2020)

Antoine Eïto (born April 6, 1988) is a French professional basketball player who last played for Élan Chalon of the LNB Pro A.

== Professional career ==
On May 31, 2013, he returned to Le Mans for two seasons.

On May 6, 2014, he was a substitute for the list of sixteen pre-selected players for the France A team to tour China and Italy in June.

On June 9, 2015, he returned to Orléans where he signed a two-year contract.

On June 26, 2021, he has signed with Élan Chalon of the Pro B.

== 3x3 career ==
As part of Team Paris, Eito won the 2020 French Championship alongside teammates Angelo Tsagarakis, Léopold Cavalière and Johan Passave-Ducteil.
