= Chris Lofton =

American basketball player (born 1986)

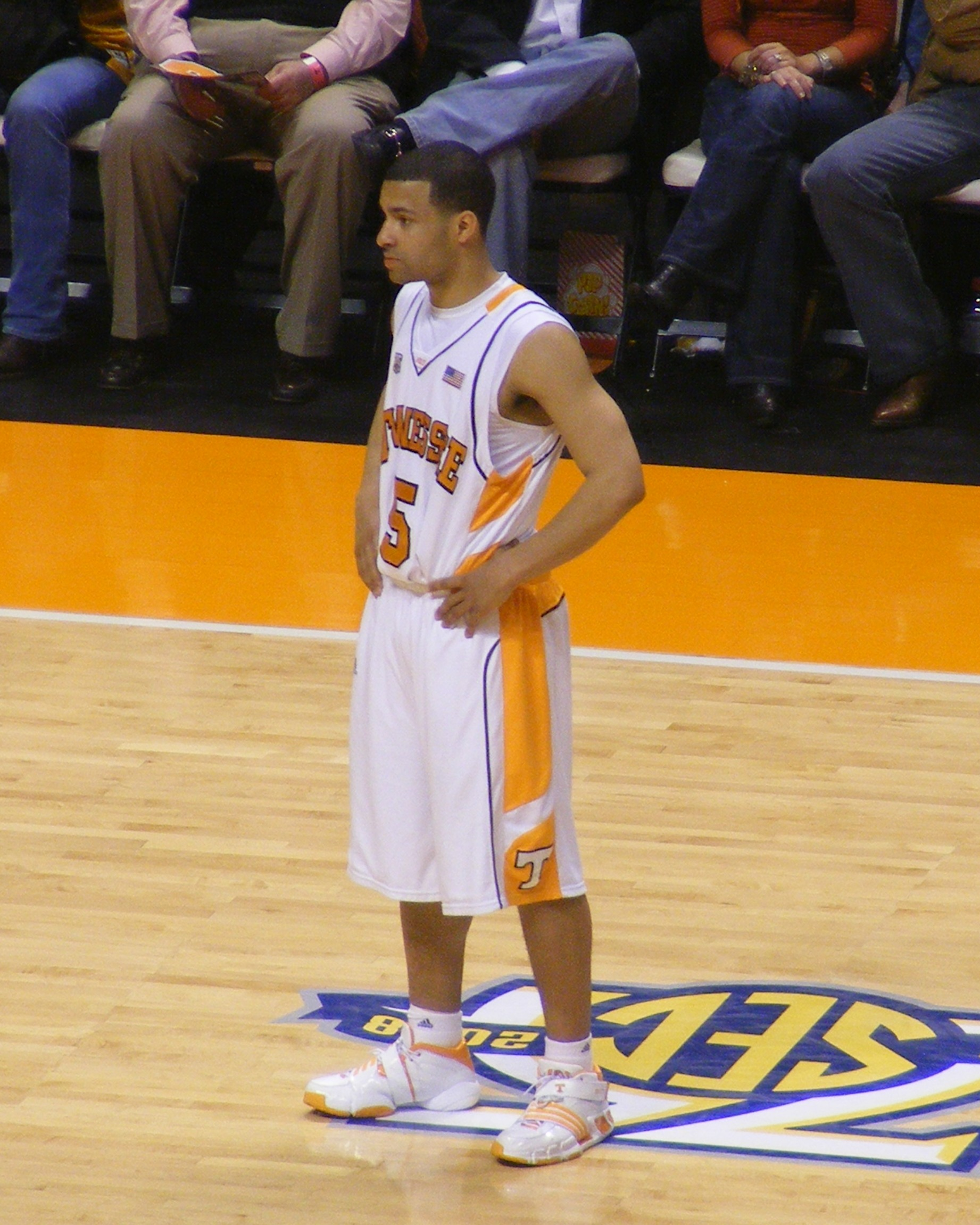
- Lofton with the Tennessee Volunteers in 2008

Personal information
- Born: March 27, 1986 (age 40) Maysville, Kentucky, U.S.
- Listed height: 6 ft 2 in (1.88 m)
- Listed weight: 195 lb (88 kg)

Career information
- High school: Mason County (Maysville, Kentucky)
- College: Tennessee (2004–2008)
- NBA draft: 2008: undrafted
- Playing career: 2008–2019
- Position: Guard

Career history
- 2008–2009: Mersin BB
- 2009: Caja Laboral
- 2009–2010: Estudiantes
- 2010–2011: Iowa Energy
- 2011–2012: Lokomotiv Kuban
- 2012: Estudiantes
- 2012–2013: Lagun Aro GBC
- 2013–2015: Beşiktaş
- 2015–2016: Le Mans Sarthe
- 2017: Neptūnas Klaipėda
- 2017–2018: Le Mans Sarthe
- 2019: Seoul SK Knights

Career highlights
- Pro A champion (2018); French Cup champion (2016); French Cup Final MVP (2016); #5 retired by Tennessee; 2× Consensus second-team All-American (2007, 2008); Second-team All-American – SN (2006); Third-team All-American – NABC (2006); SEC Player of the Year – AP (2007); 3× First-team All-SEC (2006–2008); SEC All-Freshman Team (2005); Kentucky Mr. Basketball (2004)

Christopher Franklin Lofton (born March 27, 1986) is an American former professional basketball player. He played college basketball with the University of Tennessee Volunteers.

== High school ==
Chris Lofton is from Maysville, Kentucky, where he led the Mason County Royals (his high school basketball team) to a victory in the 2003 State Championships and led the Royals back to the state championship game the next year. Despite being named Mr. Basketball his senior year, Lofton was not recruited by Louisville or Kentucky. He was recruited by University of Tennessee coach Buzz Peterson and subsequently chose to play for the Vols.

== College ==
As a freshman, Lofton made third team All-America at Tennessee. Against the University of Georgia on February 11, 2006, he made a school record 9 three-point shots en route to a career-high 33 points in an 83–78 win. On December 23, 2006, he scored a new career-high 35 points in a 111–105 overtime victory against the University of Texas. For the 2005–2006 season, Lofton was selected as a second team All-America.

In the 2006–07 season, Lofton led the conference in scoring, with 20.8 points per game, and was named the SEC Player of the Year by the Associated Press. He led the Tennessee Volunteers to the Sweet 16 in the 2007 NCAA basketball tournament. He was again named second-team All-American for the 2006–07 season. During the summer after the 06–07 season, Lofton went to Kobe Bryant camp and tried out for the Pan Am USA team.

Instead of declaring for the 2007 NBA draft, Lofton announced that he would return to Knoxville for his senior season. Lofton was featured on the cover of the November 21, 2007 Sports Illustrated issue, holding a basketball away from Chris Douglas-Roberts of the University of Memphis. Sports Illustrated picked Tennessee 3rd in the country and Lofton as a 1st Team All-American. On December 19, 2007, Lofton passed Allan Houston to become first on Tennessee's list for most three-point field goals made. Houston had held the record with 346 three-pointers made. On January 22, 2008, Lofton passed Pat Bradley of the University of Arkansas to capture the record for the most career three-pointers in the Southeastern Conference with 367. His final three-pointer came vs. Louisville in the Sweet 16 of the 2008 NCAA Tournament, a game which Tennessee lost 79–60. Lofton was also selected as a third-team All-America for his senior season.

== Pro career ==
In July 2008, Lofton signed a one-year contract with Mersin Büyükşehir Belediyesi of the Turkish Basketball League. On February 8, 2009, he scored 47 points (on 13/20 3-pointers) in a win against Fenerbahçe Ülker. On April 25, 2009, he scored 61 points (on 17/22 3-pointers) in a win against CASA TED Kolejliler. In June 2009, it was announced that Lofton had been asked to play for the Boston Celtics summer league team. In the season 2009–10, Chris Lofton was signed by Spanish ACB League powerhouse, Caja Laboral Baskonia. After only a few games played, Lofton left Caja Laboral; he had previously been hospitalized with fever. Soon after, Lofton signed with another Spanish team CB Estudiantes. In November 2010, he was selected 6th overall by the Iowa Energy in the NBA D-League Draft. However, he chose to return to Europe. In March 2011 he signed with Lokomotiv Kuban in Russia, but left the team in May 2011 by mutual agreement. In August 2011 he returned to CB Estudiantes, signing a one-year deal but finally he couldn't play with the team of Madrid until January 2012 because of his physical problems.

In August 2012, Lofton signed with Basque squad Lagun Aro GBC, but one month later left the team due to an injury in his left knee. On August 17, 2013, he signed a one-year deal with Beşiktaş. On July 18, 2014, he extended his contract with Beşiktaş for one more season. On February 22, 2017, Lofton signed with Neptūnas Klaipėda of the Lithuanian Basketball League.

On November 1, 2017, he signed with Le Mans Sarthe.

His final professional team was the Seoul SK Knights of the KBL (Korean Basketball League).

== Cancer ==
During the 2007 NCAA tournament, he failed a random drug test. The test revealed that he had elevated levels of human chorionic gonadotropin, a hormone that in men is an indicator of either steroid use or cancer. (Note: The hormone is also an indicator of pregnancy in women.) The failed test proved to be due to a tumor marker, and Lofton was diagnosed shortly afterward with testicular cancer, which he kept a secret to all but then-head coach Bruce Pearl, his parents, a small number of university officials, and ESPN journalist Chris Low, who covered most of Tennessee's games in the 2007–08 season. Not until over halfway through the 2007–08 season did Lofton even tell his roommate and teammate Jordan Howell, who was the only player to know. Afterward, he underwent successful radiation treatments and surgery and is now considered cancer-free.

In a 2025 interview with Low, Lofton was asked about what might have happened if he had not been selected for the drug test; he responded "I just know it saved my life." Lofton's cancer battle became the subject of the documentary Volunteer for Life, which premiered on the SEC Network and ESPN+ on March 10, 2025, as part of the SEC Storied series.

== Awards and accomplishments ==
- 2007 SEC Player Of The Year

== See also ==
- List of NCAA Division I men's basketball career 3-point scoring leaders
