= Vaughn Duggins =

American professional basketball player

No. 44 – s.Oliver Würzburg
- Position: Shooting guard
- League: Basketball Bundesliga; Basketball Champions League

Personal information
- Born: July 10, 1987 (age 39) Pendleton, Indiana
- Listed height: 188 cm (6 ft 2 in)
- Listed weight: 86 kg (190 lb)

Career information
- High school: Pendleton Heights (Pendleton, Indiana)
- College: Wright State (2006–2011)
- Playing career: 2011–present

Career history
- 2011–2013: Tigers Tübingen
- 2013–2014: Le Mans Sarthe
- 2014–2015: SLUC Nancy
- 2015–2017: EWE Baskets Oldenburg
- 2017–2018: s.Oliver Würzburg

Career highlights
- All-BBL Second Team (2016)

Vaughn Duggins (born July 10, 1987) is an American professional basketball player, who currently plays for s.Oliver Würzburg of the German BBL. Duggins played college basketball for the Wright State Raiders from 2006 until 2011 before turning professional.

== Professional career ==
On July 2, 2015, Duggins signed a 2-year contract with EWE Baskets Oldenburg of the German BBL.
