= Charles Kahudi =

Congolese-French basketball player

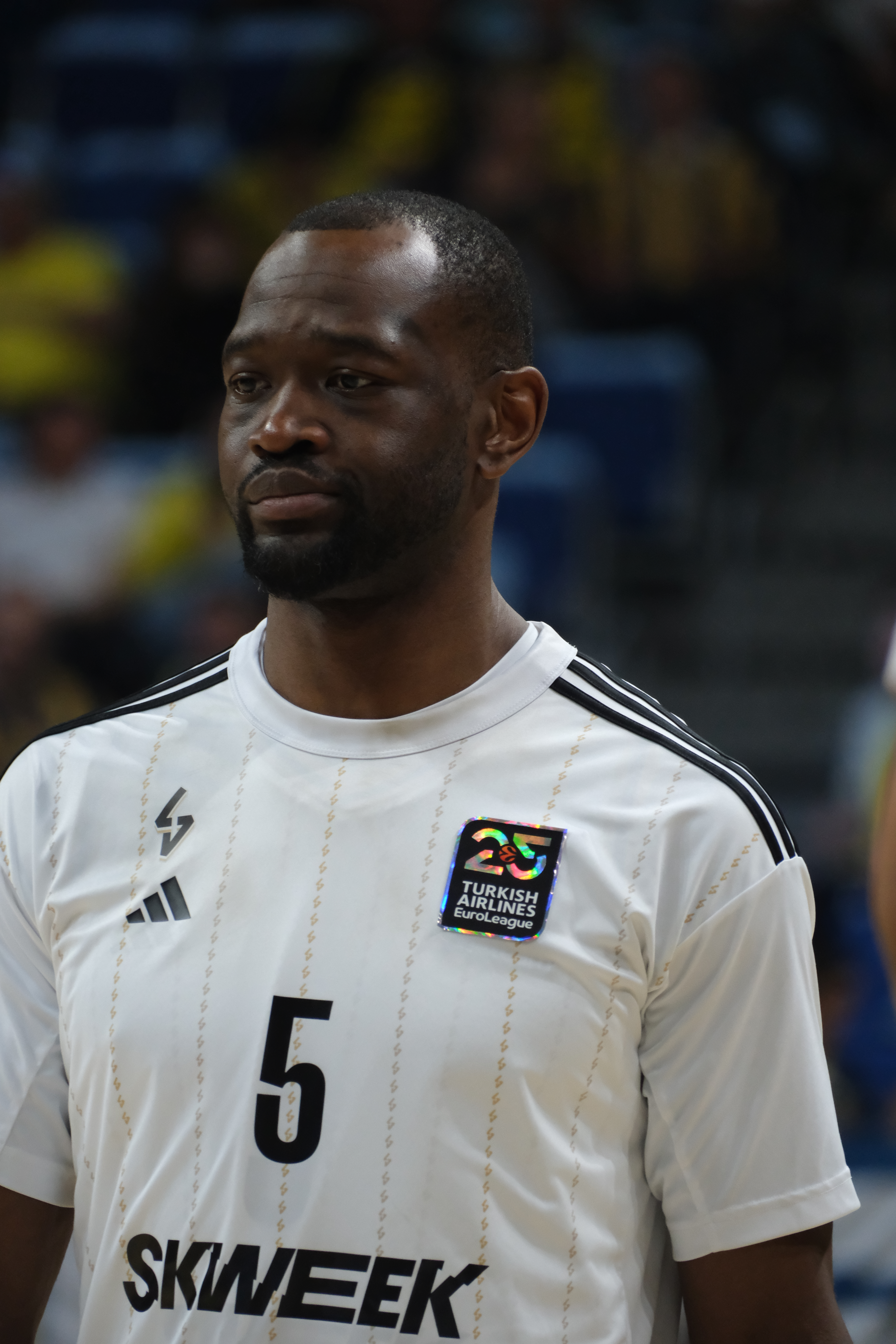
- Kahudi with LDLC ASVEL in 2025

LDLC ASVEL
- Title: Assistant general manager
- League: LNB Élite; EuroLeague

Personal information
- Born: 19 July 1986 (age 40) Kinshasa, Zaire
- Listed height: 6 ft 6.5 in (1.99 m)
- Listed weight: 220 lb (100 kg)

Career information
- NBA draft: 2008: undrafted
- Playing career: 2004–2025
- Position: Small forward / power forward
- Number: 5

Career history
- 2004–2006: Cholet
- 2006–2008: ALM Évreux
- 2008–2009: JDA Dijon
- 2009–2015: Le Mans
- 2015–2025: ASVEL

Career highlights
- 4× French League champion (2016, 2019, 2021, 2022); 2× French Cup winner (2019, 2021); Leaders Cup winner (2014, 2023); Pro A Best Defender (2016); 7× LNB All-Star (2011–2015, 2017, 2018)
Medals
Men's basketball
Representing France
World Cup
Bronze medal – third place	2014 Spain
EuroBasket
Gold medal – first place	2013 Slovenia
Silver medal – second place	2011 Lithuania
Bronze medal – third place	2015 France–Croatia–Germany–Latvia
European U-18 Championship
Bronze medal – third place	2004 Spain	U-18 Team

Charles Lumbahe Kahudi (born 19 July 1986) is a Congolese-French former professional basketball player and executive who is currently the assistant general manager for LDLC ASVEL of the French LNB Élite and the EuroLeague.

== Early life ==
Lombahe Kahudi was born in Kinshasa, Zaire. On 28 March 1997, he was legally entitled to call himself Charles, and acquired French nationality, through the collective effet of his parents' naturalization.

== Professional career ==
In his pro career, Kahudi has played with the following clubs: Cholet Basket, Évreux Basket, JDA Dijon, Le Mans, and ASVEL Basket.

On October 26, 2026, ASVEL Basket officially retired his jersey.

== French national team ==
Kahudi has represented the senior men's French national basketball team at the EuroBasket 2011, EuroBasket 2013, and EuroBasket 2015. He also played at the 2014 FIBA Basketball World Cup, and the 2016 Summer Olympics.

== Honours ==
=== Club ===
ASVEL

- LNB Pro A: 2015–16

Le Mans Sarthe Basket

- French Leaders Cup: 2014

=== Individual ===
- LNB All-Star (3): 2011, 2012, 2013
- LNB Pro A Best Defender: 2016

== Career statistics ==
Legend
GP	Games played	GS	Games started	MPG	Minutes per game
FG%	Field-goal percentage	3P%	3-point field-goal percentage	FT%	Free-throw percentage
RPG	Rebounds per game	APG	Assists per game	SPG	Steals per game
BPG	Blocks per game	PPG	Points per game	PIR	Performance index rating
**Bold**	Career high

=== EuroLeague ===
Year	Team	GP	GS	MPG	FG%	3P%	FT%	RPG	APG	SPG	BPG	PPG	PIR
2019–20	ASVEL	23	**18**	**21.4**	**.430**	.365	.846	**2.9**	.8	.5	.1	**7.0**	**6.3**
2020–21	ASVEL	**31**	16	21.2	.417	**.394**	**.906**	2.4	**.9**	**.8**	.1	5.6	5.5
2021–22	ASVEL	26	10	19.9	.377	.292	.682	2.7	.6	.2	**.2**	4.9	4.0
2022–23	ASVEL	29	12	18.8	.411	.351	.895	2.5	.4	.4	.1	6.2	5.6
2023–24	ASVEL	29	5	17.3	.364	.244	.773	**2.9**	.8	.1	—	3.9	4.0
Career		138	61	19.7	.402	.336	.836	2.7	.7	.4	.1	5.5	5.1

=== EuroCup ===
Year	Team	GP	GS	MPG	FG%	3P%	FT%	RPG	APG	SPG	BPG	PPG	PIR
2009–10	Le Mans	12	0	15.0	.343	**.400**	.875	2.5	.6	.3	.2	2.9	2.3
2010–11	Le Mans	11	8	19.8	.429	.345	.600	2.8	.5	.5	—	6.1	4.6
2011–12	Le Mans	5	5	26.2	.276	.222	**1.000**	4.2	1.6	**1.2**	—	4.8	4.4
2012–13	Le Mans	6	6	25.0	.429	**.400**	.875	5.0	1.0	1.0	.2	8.3	9.8
2013–14	Le Mans	10	6	25.3	.382	.261	.842	4.2	1.3	.5	**.6**	6.4	9.6
2017–18	ASVEL	15	**15**	**27.2**	.423	.390	.780	**5.1**	**1.8**	1.1	.3	10.1	**12.1**
2018–19	ASVEL	**16**	12	24.7	**.455**	.345	.805	4.4	.9	.6	.3	**10.3**	10.9
Career		75	52	23.1	.412	.346	.801	4.0	1.1	.7	.2	7.4	8.2

=== Basketball Champions League ===
Year	Team	GP	GS	MPG	FG%	3P%	FT%	RPG	APG	SPG	BPG	PPG
2016–17	ASVEL	3	2	23.4	.345	.100	.727	4.7	—	1.0	.3	9.7
Career		3	2	23.4	.345	.100	.727	4.7	—	1.0	.3	9.7

=== FIBA Europe Cup ===
Year	Team	GP	GS	MPG	FG%	3P%	FT%	RPG	APG	SPG	BPG	PPG
2015–16	ASVEL	13	13	24.9	.553	.462	.879	4.9	1.5	.5	.3	11.6
Career		13	13	24.9	.553	.462	.879	4.9	1.5	.5	.3	11.6

=== FIBA EuroChallenge ===
Year	Team	GP	GS	MPG	FG%	3P%	FT%	RPG	APG	SPG	BPG	PPG
2014–15	Le Mans	12	10	22.3	.459	.318	.813	4.7	1.4	.9	—	7.3
Career		12	10	22.3	.459	.318	.813	4.7	1.4	.9	—	7.3

=== Domestic leagues ===
Year	Team	League	GP	MPG	FG%	3P%	FT%	RPG	APG	SPG	BPG	PPG
2004–05	(France) Cholet	Pro A	2	3.5	.000	.000	1.000	.5	.5	—	—	1.0
2005–06	(France) Cholet	Pro A	6	1.7	.250	—	—	.5	.2	—	—	0.3
2006–07	(France) ALM Évreux	Pro B	29	11.0	.208	.000	.667	2.1	1.0	.3	—	1.5
2007–08	(France) ALM Évreux	Pro B	27	24.8	.519	.371	.826	4.1	1.8	.7	.4	10.7
2008–09	(France) JDA Dijon	Pro A	28	11.8	.423	.138	.793	2.5	.5	.3	.2	4.1
2009–10	(France) Le Mans	Pro A	36	14.7	.487	.388	.745	2.3	.8	.3	.1	4.7
2010–11	(France) Le Mans	Pro A	23	19.5	.432	.271	.619	3.3	1.2	.8	.1	7.2
2011–12	(France) Le Mans	Pro A	35	30.8	.421	.387	.802	5.4	1.5	.9	.2	10.6
2012–13	(France) Le Mans	Pro A	19	30.3	.396	.341	.792	4.4	1.4	.6	.3	9.5
2013–14	(France) Le Mans	Pro A	32	26.9	.452	.376	.863	4.7	1.2	.8	.3	8.8
2014–15	(France) Le Mans	Pro A	34	30.1	.444	.300	.868	5.6	1.3	.8	.3	12.2
2015–16	(France) ASVEL	Pro A	44	27.5	.442	.425	.807	5.3	1.9	.5	.2	11.5
2016–17	(France) ASVEL	Pro A	24	22.5	.389	.289	.813	3.5	1.2	.8	.1	8.3
2017–18	(France) ASVEL	Pro A	32	27.2	.442	.352	.840	4.6	1.3	.6	.4	10.6
2018–19	(France) ASVEL	LNB Élite	37	22.5	.380	.330	.841	4.2	.9	.6	.1	8.5
2019–20	(France) ASVEL	LNB Élite	16	18.8	.532	.526	.857	3.1	1.4	.4	—	7.9
2020–21	(France) ASVEL	LNB Élite	26	17.9	.402	.386	.875	2.3	.7	.6	.1	6.3
2021–22	(France) ASVEL	LNB Élite	28	20.3	.397	.330	.865	3.0	1.0	.5	.1	7.1
2022–23	(France) ASVEL	LNB Élite	32	19.4	.411	.301	.906	3.5	.8	.7	.1	6.5
2023–24	(France) ASVEL	LNB Élite	28	13.9	.413	.279	.829	2.1	.5	.3	.1	3.8
