= 2015–16 French Basketball Cup =

39th season of the French Basketball Cup

French Basketball Cup
- Season: 2015–16
- Duration: September 11, 2015 – May 1, 2016
- Games played: 56

Finals
- Champions: Le Mans Sarthe (4th title)
- Runners-up: ASVEL

Awards
- Final MVP: (United States) Chris Lofton

The 2015–16 French Basketball Cup season (French: 2015–16 Coupe de France de Basket) was the 39th season of the domestic cup competition of French basketball. The competition started on September 11, 2015, and ended on May 1, 2016. Le Mans Sarthe Basket won its 4th Cup.

== Final ==
May 1, 2016	ASVEL	75–88	Le Mans	Paris
18:00	Scoring by quarter: 17–27, 24–23, 14–18, 20–20
	Pts: Ware 22; Rebs: Andersen 7 Asts: Kahudi 3	Boxscore	Pts: Lofton 21; Rebs: Yarou 10; Asts: McKee 7	Arena: AccorHotels Arena

ASVEL	Le Mans

MVP (United States) Chris Lofton Game rules Game was played under FIBA rules. Arena Halle Georges Carpentier 2014 French Cup Winners Le Mans Sarthe Basket (4th title)
