= Théo Maledon =

French basketball player (born 2001)

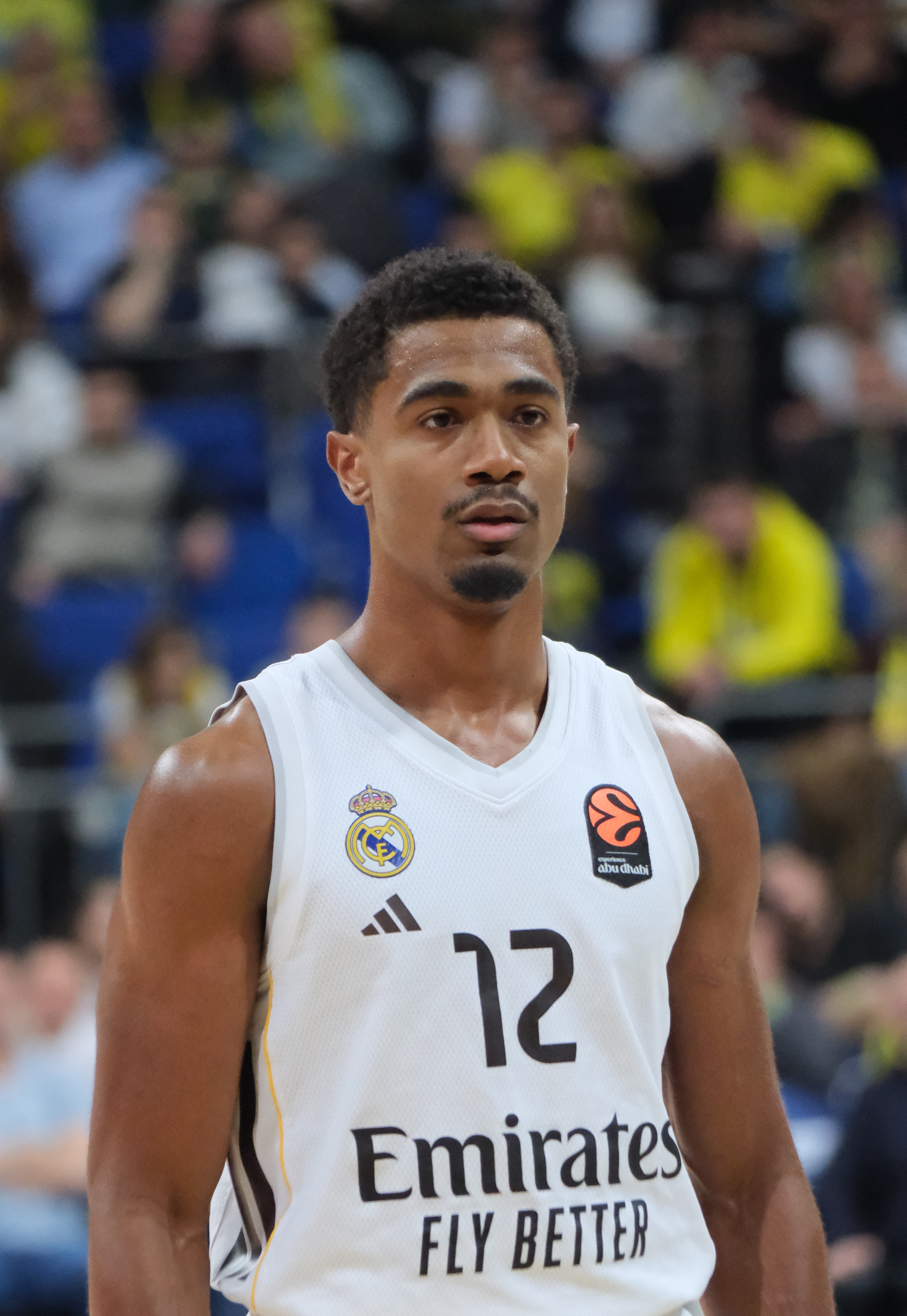
- Maledon with Real Madrid in 2026

No. 12 – Real Madrid
- Position: Shooting guard / point guard
- League: Liga ACB; EuroLeague

Personal information
- Born: 12 June 2001 (age 25) Rouen, France
- Listed height: 1.97 m (6 ft 6 in)
- Listed weight: 87 kg (192 lb)

Career information
- NBA draft: 2020: 2nd round, 34th overall pick
- Drafted by: Philadelphia 76ers
- Playing career: 2017–present

Career history
- 2017–2020: ASVEL
- 2020–2022: Oklahoma City Thunder
- 2021–2022: →Oklahoma City Blue
- 2022–2023: Charlotte Hornets
- 2022–2023: →Greensboro Swarm
- 2023–2024: Phoenix Suns
- 2024: Sioux Falls Skyforce
- 2024–2025: ASVEL
- 2025–present: Real Madrid

Career highlights
- All-EuroLeague Second Team (2025); EuroLeague SuperCup champion (2026); LNB Élite champion (2019); French Cup winner (2019); All-LNB Élite First Team (2025); LNB Élite Best Young Player (2019); French Cup Final MVP (2019); LNB All-Star (2018)
- Stats at NBA.com
- Stats at Basketball Reference
Medals
Men's basketball
Representing France
EuroBasket
Silver medal – second place	2022 Czech Republic–Georgia–Italy–Germany
FIBA Under-17 World Cup
Silver medal – second place	2018 Argentina	Team
FIBA U16 European Championship
Gold medal – first place	2017 Montenegro	Team

Théo Louis Maledon (French: [teo malɛdɔ̃]; born 12 June 2001) is a French professional basketball player for Real Madrid of the Liga ACB and the EuroLeague. Born in Rouen, Maledon played youth basketball for French sports institute INSEP before joining the youth ranks of ASVEL Lyon-Villeurbanne at age 16. One year later, at the senior level, he became the youngest LNB All-Star in history and won the LNB Pro A Best Young Player award. He helped ASVEL win Pro A and French Cup titles, while being named French Cup Final Most Valuable Player.

At the youth international level, Maledon won a gold medal with France at the 2016 FIBA U16 European Championship and a silver medal at the 2018 FIBA Under-17 World Cup. He has also played for the senior national team.

== Early life and career ==
Maledon was born on 12 June 2001 in Rouen in Normandy, France. He is of Guadeloupean descent. At age three, Maledon began playing basketball with his local club Mesnil-Esnard in Seine-Maritime. After reaching the under-11 age group, he moved to SPO Rouen, the most prominent club in his area. In 2015, at age 14, Maledon joined the National Institute of Sport, Expertise, and Performance (INSEP), a sports institute in Paris, on a scholarship. In the 2015–16 season, he played three games for INSEP-affiliated team Centre Fédéral de Basket-ball in the Nationale Masculine 1 (NM1), the amateur third-tier division of French basketball, and two games for INSEP's under-18 team in the Adidas Next Generation Tournament (ANGT).

In 2016–17, Maledon became a regular starter with Centre Fédéral in the NM1, where he averaged 8.2 points, 2.4 rebounds, and 2.7 assists in 25.6 minutes per game. He scored a season-best 20 points, along with five rebounds and four assists, in a 23 April 2017 loss to Union Tarbes-Lourdes Pyrénées. In the same month, Maledon took part in the Jordan Brand Classic Global Showcase at the Barclays Center in Brooklyn, where he scored 15 points.

== Professional career ==
=== ASVEL (2017–2020) ===
==== 2017–18 season ====
On 16 June 2017, Maledon joined the junior team of LNB Pro A club ASVEL that played in the LNB Espoirs, the French U21 league. In his season debut on 24 September 2017, he recorded 10 points and five assists in a 71–61 win over Espoirs Limoges. Maledon made his Pro A debut for the senior team on 30 September at age 16, playing one minute versus Cholet. He became the second youngest debutant in club history. On 17 October, he made his first appearance in the EuroCup against ratiopharm Ulm. In January 2018, Maledon played for ASVEL's under-18 team at the ANGT in L'Hospitalet. He recorded 35 points and 11 assists on 7 January to help defeat the junior team of Gran Canaria in his final game in the tournament. On 12 May 2018, Maledon scored 26 points against Espoirs Monaco, his season-high in the LNB Espoirs. Through 33 Espoirs games, he averaged 15.7 points, 4.5 rebounds, and 4.9 assists per game. During summer 2018, he graduated high school one year in advance with major in science.

==== 2018–19 season ====
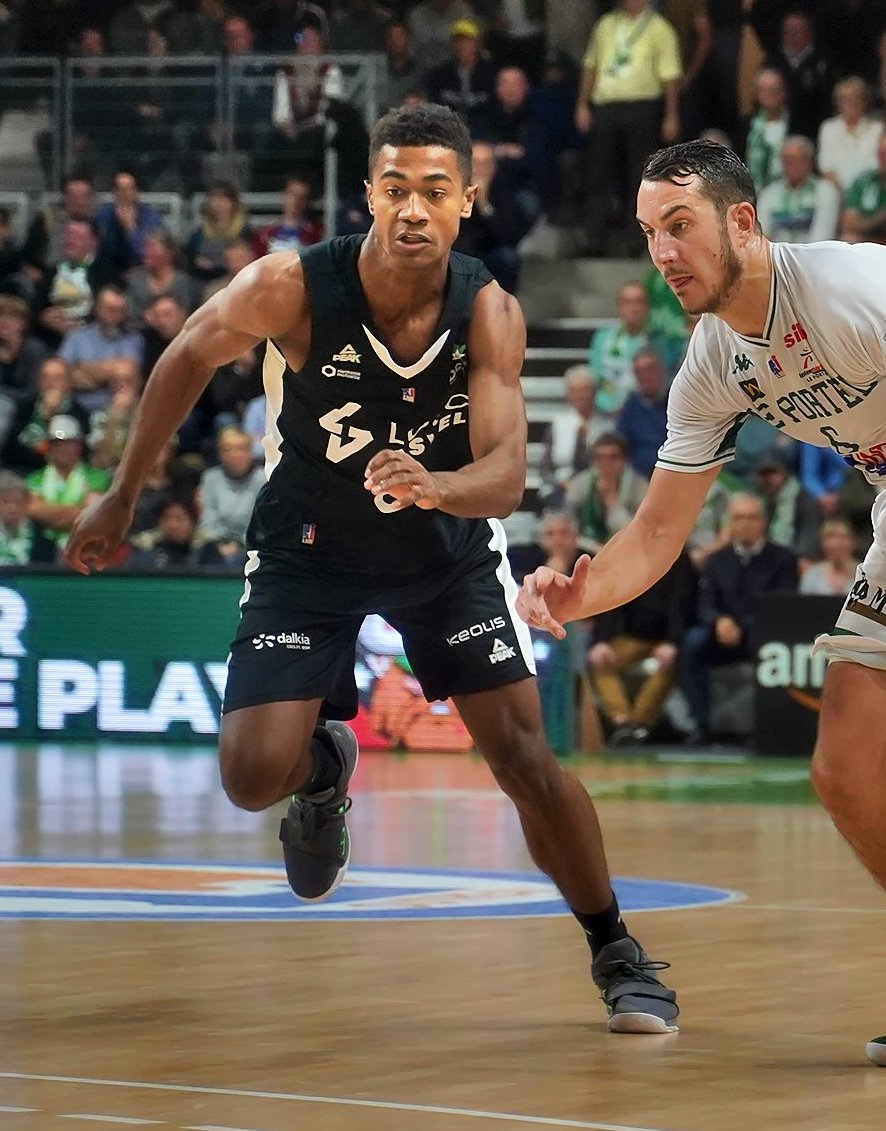
Maledon (left) defends Le Portel's Benoît Mangin in December 2018.

On 13 August 2018, Maledon signed his first professional contract, agreeing to remain with ASVEL for three years. In the 2018–19 season, he assumed a greater role for the senior team and frequently made its starting lineup. On 6 October, Maledon recorded 15 points, four rebounds, and four assists, making six of seven field goal attempts, in an 88–64 victory over Fos Provence. His ranking of 22 in the game was the most by a Pro A player under age 18 since Tony Parker recorded a ranking of 24 against BCM Gravelines in 1999. On 3 November, Maledon recorded a career-high 16 points, four rebounds, and two steals against JDA Dijon. He eclipsed his career high on 18 November versus Le Mans Sarthe, when he recorded 20 points, four assists, and two steals.

On 18 December 2018, against Zenit Saint Petersburg, Maledon had 13 points, along with seven rebounds and three assists, for his best scoring effort in the EuroCup. He recorded 18 points, five assists, two steals, and a career-best ranking of 26, against Levallois on 26 December. Maledon played in the LNB All-Star Game on 29 December, and at age 17 and a half, became the youngest All-Star since the event was created in 1987. On 12 May 2019, he scored a team-high 13 points in a 70–61 win over Le Mans in the French Cup championship and was named Final MVP. He was the youngest to ever win this award at age 17. Maledon was named LNB Pro A Best Young Player at the end of the season. In June 2019, he helped ASVEL win the Pro A finals over Monaco. In a total of 62 games in the season, Maledon averaged seven points, 2.1 rebounds, and two assists in 17.3 minutes per game.

==== 2019–20 season ====
Entering the 2019–20 season, Maledon was considered the favorite to win the EuroLeague Rising Star award by the league's website. In his season opener, a Pro A win over Limoges on 22 September 2019, he recorded six points and eight assists in 19 minutes. On 4 October, Maledon made his EuroLeague debut, playing nine minutes in a victory over Olympiacos. In his subsequent game, two days later against Cholet, he suffered a shoulder injury that forced him to miss over one month of action. On 17 January 2020, Maledon recorded a career-high 10 assists, along with five points and six rebounds, in a 101–74 loss to Anadolu Efes. One week later, he scored 19 points, his best mark in the EuroLeague, in a 100–88 loss to Panathinaikos. On 14 February, Maledon matched his career high in scoring with 20 points in an 88–59 victory over Metropolitans 92 at the LNB Pro A Leaders Cup semifinals. On 5 April, while the basketball season was suspended due to the COVID-19 pandemic, he declared for the 2020 NBA draft. Maledon finished the season averaging 7.3 points, 2.7 assists, and 1.9 rebounds in 17.3 minutes per game, through 46 combined appearances in the EuroLeague, Pro A and Leaders Cup.

=== Oklahoma City Thunder (2020–2022) ===
Maledon was selected with the 34th overall pick by the Philadelphia 76ers in the 2020 NBA draft. On 8 December 2020, Maledon's draft rights were traded to the Oklahoma City Thunder, and the next day, he signed a contract.

On 30 September 2022 Maledon was traded, along with Derrick Favors, Ty Jerome, Maurice Harkless, and a future second-round pick, to the Houston Rockets in exchange for David Nwaba, Sterling Brown, Trey Burke, and Marquese Chriss. On 11 October he was waived.

=== Charlotte Hornets (2022–2023) ===
On 15 October 2022, Maledon signed a two-way contract with the Charlotte Hornets.

On 29 September 2023, Maledon re-signed with the Hornets on another two-way contract, but was waived on 14 December.

=== Phoenix Suns (2023–2024) ===
On 17 December 2023, Maledon signed a two-way contract with the Phoenix Suns. However, he did not make his debut with the team until 8 February 2024, playing in only a minute and 14 seconds left of the Suns' 129–115 win over the Utah Jazz. Maledon then recorded 5 points and one rebound for the Suns six days later on Valentine's Day during nearly 10 minutes of playing time in a 116–100 win over the Detroit Pistons.

Maledon was waived on 4 March 2024 after playing in four games with the Suns.

=== Sioux Falls Skyforce (2024) ===
On 11 March 2024, Maledon joined the Sioux Falls Skyforce.

On 13 June 2024, Maledon was selected by the Valley Suns in the 2024 NBA G League expansion draft. However, he never played for them.

=== Return to ASVEL (2024–2025) ===
On 14 August 2024, Maledon returned to LDLC ASVEL. On 5 December, he earned his third MVP award after scoring 23 points, 2 rebounds and 7 assists in a game against Real Madrid. He also received MVP honors in Week 4 and Week 10.

=== Real Madrid (2025–present) ===
On May 27, 2025, Maledon signed with Real Madrid.

== National team career ==
=== French junior national team ===
Maledon made his youth debut for France at the 2016 FIBA Under-16 European Championship in Radom, Poland. Through seven games, he averaged 8.4 points, four rebounds, and 2.4 assists per game. Maledon played for the French team at the 2017 FIBA Under-16 European Championship in Podgorica, Montenegro. He averaged 14.6 points, 5.1 rebounds, and 3.1 assists per game through seven contests, scoring 20 points in the final against Montenegro to help France win the gold medal. Maledon was named captain for France at the 2018 FIBA Under-17 Basketball World Cup in Argentina. Through seven games, he averaged 11.1 points, 6.1 rebounds, and 4.1 assists per game as France finished in second place.

=== French senior national team ===
On 24 February 2019, Maledon debuted for the French senior national team during the 2019 FIBA World Cup qualification stage. He played 15 minutes, recording three points and three rebounds, in a 76–69 loss to Finland. On 7 August, Maledon scored 14 points, making 4–of–5 field goal attempts, in a 94–56 victory over Tunisia in preparation for the World Cup. He was among the final cuts from France's World Cup roster, in part due to a shoulder injury. He also represented France at EuroBasket 2025, where his team was eliminated in the Round of 16.

== Career statistics ==
Legend
GP	Games played	GS	Games started	MPG	Minutes per game
FG%	Field goal percentage	3P%	3-point field goal percentage	FT%	Free throw percentage
RPG	Rebounds per game	APG	Assists per game	SPG	Steals per game
BPG	Blocks per game	PPG	Points per game	**Bold**	Career high

=== NBA ===
==== Regular season ====
Year	Team	GP	GS	MPG	FG%	3P%	FT%	RPG	APG	SPG	BPG	PPG
2020–21	Oklahoma City	**65**	**49**	**27.4**	.368	**.335**	.748	**3.2**	**3.5**	**.9**	.2	**10.1**
2021–22	Oklahoma City	51	7	17.8	.375	.293	.790	2.6	2.2	.6	.2	7.1
2022–23	Charlotte	44	7	19.4	**.402**	.295	.851	2.8	**3.5**	.8	**.3**	6.7
2023–24	Charlotte	13	1	15.4	.288	.167	.917	1.8	2.2	.5	.0	4.2
2023–24	Phoenix	4	0	3.3	.250	—	**1.000**	.3	.0	.0	.0	1.3
Career		177	64	21.2	.372	.310	.793	2.8	2.9	.7	.2	7.8

=== EuroLeague ===
Year	Team	GP	GS	MPG	FG%	3P%	FT%	RPG	APG	SPG	BPG	PPG	PIR
2019–20	ASVEL	22	12	17.7	**.456**	**.367**	.689	1.8	3.1	.3	.1	7.4	6.6
2024–25	ASVEL	**33**	**33**	**27.6**	.440	.344	**.904**	**3.5**	**4.6**	**1.0**	**.2**	**17.0**	**20.6**
Career		55	45	23.6	.044	.034	.089	2.8	.4	.7	.2	13.2	13.6

=== EuroCup ===
Year	Team	GP	GS	MPG	FG%	3P%	FT%	RPG	APG	SPG	BPG	PPG
2018–19	ASVEL	18	12	17.8	.409	.351	.826	2.4	2.1	.4	.2	7.1

== Personal life ==
Both of Maledon's parents played basketball: his mother, Sylvie, with the French junior national team, and his father, Claude, in the NM1. His uncle, Dominique Guéret, was an assistant coach for LNB Pro B club ALM Évreux. His older sister, Lena, plays college basketball in the United States and his younger brother Matys plays in Montville, France.
