= Gérard Sturla =

French basketball player and coach

Gérard Sturla (31 July 1930 – 24 April 2006) was a French basketball player coach. He played for ASVEL Basket from 1951 through 1960, winning LNB Nationale championships with the team in 1952, 1955, 1956 and 1957, and French Basketball Cups in 1953 and 1957. He coached ASVEL from 1960 until 1963, and coached Chorale Roanne Basket during the 1971–1972 season. He played with the France national basketball team, finishing fourth in the 1956 Summer Olympics and eighth in EuroBasket 1957. He died in Décines.
