= 2015 Pro A Leaders Cup =

- Season: 2014–15
- Duration: 20–22 February 2015
- Games played: 7
- Teams: 8

Regular season
- Season MVP: (France) Antoine Diot

Finals
- Champions: SIG Strasbourg (1st title)
- Runners-up: Le Mans

The 2015 LNB Pro A Leaders Cup season was the 19th edition of this tournament, the third since it was renamed as Leaders Cup. The event included the eight top teams from the first half of the 2014–15 Pro A regular season and was played in Disneyland Paris. SIG Strasbourg won their first title after beating Le Mans in the Final.

== Bracket ==
Quarterfinals
SIG Strasbourg	73
STB Le Havre	57
JDA Dijon	80
Paris-Levallois Basket	66
Nanterre 92	96
Le Mans	98
Limoges CSP	68
SLUC Nancy Basket	77

Semifinals
SIG Strasbourg	79
JDA Dijon	72
Le Mans	64
SLUC Nancy Basket	62

Finals
SIG Strasbourg	60
Le Mans	58

== Final ==
February 22, 2015	Strasbourg IG	60–58	Le Mans Sarthe	Disneyland Paris
17:00 (UTC +1)	Scoring by quarter: 13–15, 18–9, 16–8, 13–26
	Pts: Diot 11; Rebs: Fofana 6 Howard 6 Asts: Diot 5	Boxscore	Pts: Ewing 12; Kahudi 12; Rebs: Kahudi 8 Asts: Cornelie 2 Wallace 2 Ely 2

Strasbourg	Le Mans

MVP (France) Antoine Diot Game rules Game was played under FIBA rules. Arena Disneyland Paris 2015 Leaders Cup Winners Strasbourg IG (1st title)
