= ASVEL Basket =

French professional basketball team since 1948

LDLC ASVEL
- Leagues: LNB Élite; EuroLeague
- Founded: 1948; 78 years ago
- Arena: OL Arena; Astroballe
- Capacity: 12,523 (OL Arena); 5,560 (Astroballe)
- Location: Villeurbanne, Metropolis of Lyon, France
- Main sponsor: Groupe LDLC
- General manager: Michel Veyronnet
- Head coach: Tony Parker
- Team captain: David Lighty
- Championships: 21 French Championships; 10 French Cup; 2 French Supercup; 1 French Federation Cup; 1 French Leaders Cup
- Retired numbers: (4, 4, 5)
- Website: ldlcasvel.com
Home	Away	Third

ASVEL Basket, known as LDLC ASVEL since 2018 due to sponsorship reasons, is a French professional basketball team located in the commune of Villeurbanne, a suburb of Lyon, France. The club, which is the basketball section of the ASVEL multi-sports club, competes at the highest level of French basketball, the LNB Élite. The club's home games are played in both the OL Arena and the Astroballe which have seating capacities of 12,523 and 5,560 respectively.

Founded in 1948, the team is the most successful in French basketball with 21 LNB Élite championships and 10 French Cup titles.

In June 2019, football club Olympique Lyonnais's holding company OL Groupe purchased a 25% stake in the ASVEL men's team, plus a 10% stake in the ASVEL women's team, in a deal worth around €3.7 million. The deal also included a plan for a new EuroLeague-standard arena.

== History ==
The parent club was founded in 1948, with the merger of two multi-sport clubs in Lyon and vicinity; ASVEL is an acronym combining the names of the predecessor clubs—Association Sportive Villeurbanne and Éveil Lyonnais. In its history, ASVEL has won 21 French Pro A League championships, 10 French Cups, two French Supercups, one French Federation Cup, and one Semaine des As Cup (French Pro A Leaders Cup), which makes it the most titled basketball club in France.

In 2014, former San Antonio Spurs star and France national team player, Tony Parker, became the club's president.

In the French Pro A League 2015–16 season, ASVEL won its 18th French League title, after beating Strasbourg IG 3 games to 2 in the French Pro A League Finals. ASVEL was down 2–0 in the series, but won three games in a row to take the championship.

In March 2017, NBA player, Nicolas Batum, became a shareholder in Infinity Nine Sports, the main investment company behind the club, and took over the position as director of basketball operations. Tony Parker remained majority owner, and ASVEL President. In 2018, the club signed a 10-year name sponsorship agreement with Groupe LDLC. The club also changed its main team colors from the original white and green to white and black, and changed its main logo design.

In 2019, ASVEL returned to the EuroLeague after the organisation decided to give the team a wild card for two years.

In the 2021–22 season, ASVEL won its third Pro A championship in a row, its first three-peat in 32 years after beating Monaco in the Finals. Over the next few seasons, ASVEL largely disappointed - with Monaco and later, Paris Basketball overtaking ASVEL in the Pro A, and poor showings in the EuroLeague.

== Arenas ==
In July 2016, ASVEL announced that it would build a new multi-functional arena, with a projected seating capacity between 12,000 and 16,000 people, depending on the configuration. The arena is projected to cost €60 million. The new arena will be named the LDLC Arena, and its design and construction were given to architectural firm Populous and Citinea. Construction began in January 2022 and was opened in November 2023.

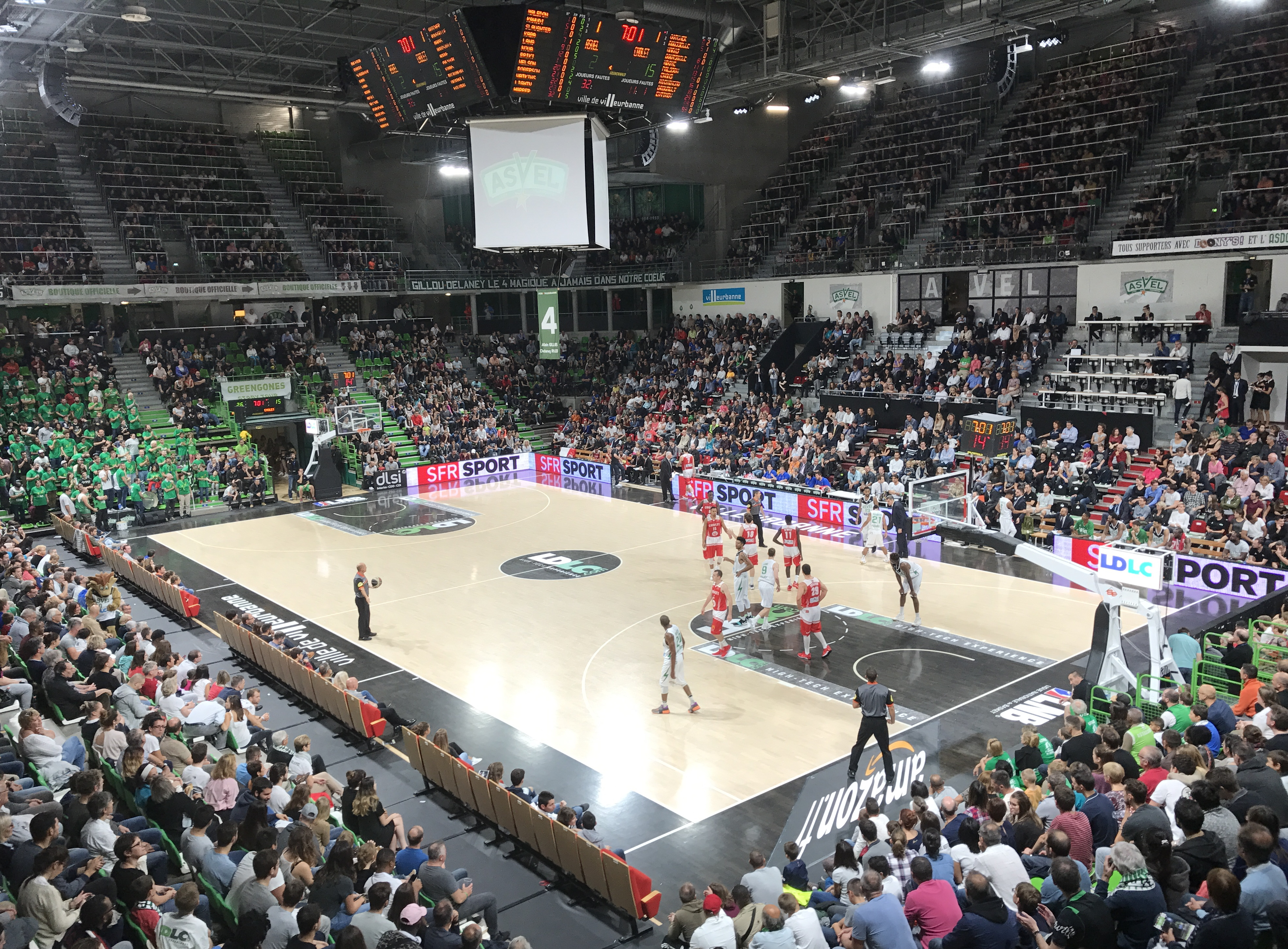
Astroballe

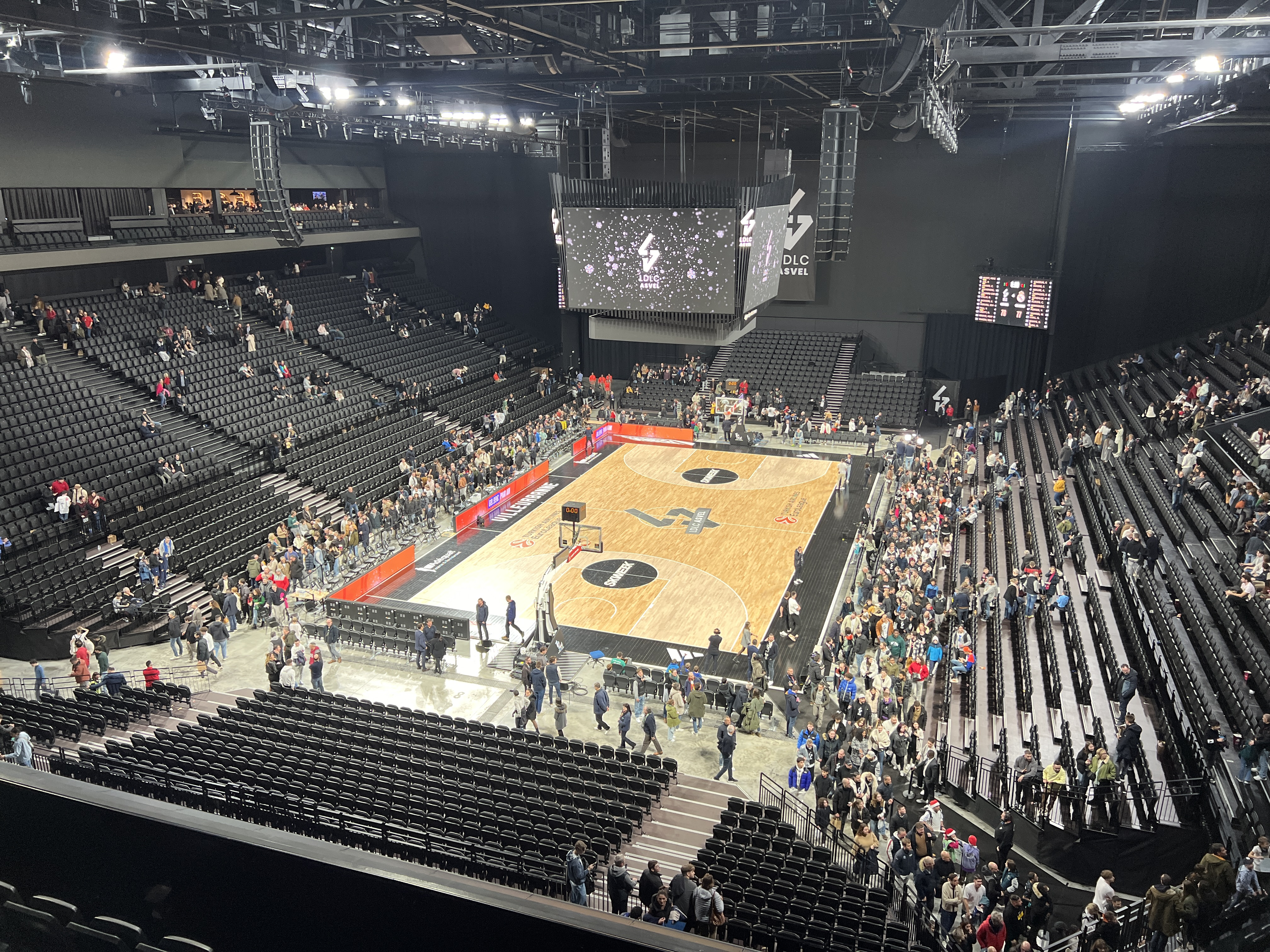
LDLC Arena

== Logos and branding ==
(The official logo of the club, 2011–2018)

(The official logo of the club, 2018–present)

On September 11, 2018, the club changed its name to LDLC ASVEL for sponsorship reasons. Along with this change, the club changed its main colors from green to black and white. The decision was made with the explanation that, "when you are European, green is a colour that does not make you dream", and was followed by criticism from fans. The new logo, used since 2018, consists of the number four, which refers to ASVEL legend Alain Gilles, while also keeping the V that was used in the previous logo.

== Honours and other achievements ==
Honours
Type	Competition	Titles	Seasons
Domestic	French League	21	1948–49, 1949–50, 1951–52, 1954–55, 1955–56, 1956–57, 1963–64, 1965–66, 1967–68, 1968–69, 1970–71, 1971–72, 1974–75, 1976–77, 1980–81, 2001–02, 2008–09, 2015–16, 2018–19, 2020–21, 2021–22
Domestic	French Cup	10	1952–53, 1956–57, 1964–65, 1966–67, 1995–96, 1996–97, 2000–01, 2007–08, 2018–19, 2020–21
Domestic	French Federation Cup	1	1983–84
Domestic	French League Cup	2	2010, 2023
Domestic	French Supercup	2	2009, 2016

Record

=== Other Achievements ===
==== International competitions ====
- EuroLeague
  - Semifinalists (1): 1975–76
  - 3rd place (1): 1977–78
  - 4th place (1): 1996–97
  - Final Four (1): 1997
- FIBA Saporta Cup
  - Runners-up (1): 1982–83
  - Semifinalists (2): 1984–85, 1986–87
- FIBA Korać Cup
  - Semifinalists (1): 1995–96
- Latin Cup
  - 3rd place (2): 1953, 1966

==== Domestic competitions ====
- French League
  - Runners-up (7): 1953–54, 1958–59, 1995–96, 1996–97, 1998–99, 1999–00, 2002–03
- French Cup
  - Runners-up (5): 1953–54, 1954–55, 1958–59, 2001–02, 2015–16
- French League Cup
  - Runners-up (2): 2017, 2020
- French Super Cup
  - Runners-up (1): 2008
- Federation Cup (defunct)
- Winners (1): 1983–84
  - Runners-up (1): 1981–82

==== Other competitions ====
- Villeurbanne, France Invitational Game

Winners (1): 2020

== Season by season ==
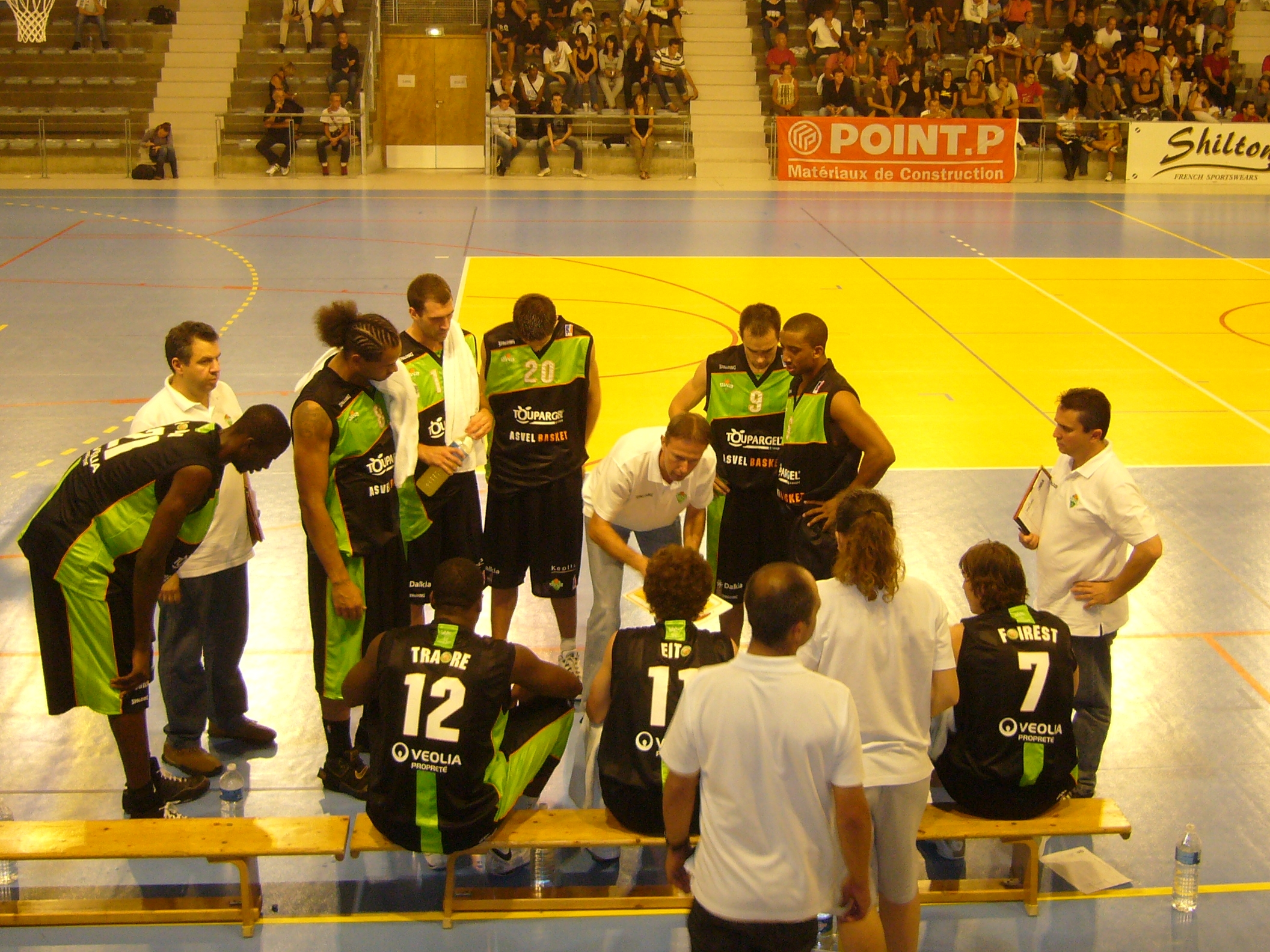
The ASVEL team during the 2008–09 season

Season by season results of the club in national, cup, and European competitions.

Season	Tier	League	Pos.	French Cup	A Leaders Cup	European competitions	
2008–09	1	Pro A	1st	Quarterfinalist	Semifinalist	2 Eurocup	RS
2009–10	1	Pro A	9th	Round of 16	Champion	1 Euroleague	RS
2010–11	1	Pro A	11th	Semifinalist	Semifinalist	1 Euroleague	QR2
2010–11	1	Pro A	11th	Semifinalist	Semifinalist	2 Eurocup	RS
2011–12	1	Pro A	12th	Round of 16		1 Euroleague	QR2
2011–12	1	Pro A	12th	Round of 16		2 Eurocup	L16
2012–13	1	Pro A	3rd	Semifinalist	Quarterfinalist		
2013–14	1	Pro A	7th	Round of 32		2 Eurocup	RS
2014–15	1	Pro A	6th	Quarterfinalist		1 Euroleague	QR3
2014–15	1	Pro A	6th	Quarterfinalist		2 Eurocup	RS
2015–16	1	Pro A	1st	Runner-up	Semifinalist	3 FIBA Europe Cup	L16
2016–17	1	Pro A	4th	Round of 32	Runner-up	3 Champions League	QF
2017–18	1	Pro A	6th	Quarterfinalist	Semifinalist	2 EuroCup	T16
2018–19	1	Pro A	1st	Champion	Quarterfinalist	2 EuroCup	QF
2019–20	1	Pro A	–^{1}	–^{1}	Runner-up	1 EuroLeague	RS^{1}
2020–21	1	Pro A	1st	Champion		1 EuroLeague	RS
2021–22	1	Pro A	1st	Quarterfinalist		1 EuroLeague	RS
2022–23	1	Pro A	3rd	Runner-up	Champion	1 EuroLeague	RS
2023–24	1	Pro A	3rd	Round of 16	Quarterfinalist	1 EuroLeague	RS
2024–25	1	Pro A	3rd	Quarterfinalist	Semifinalist	1 EuroLeague	RS

^1 Cancelled due to the COVID-19 pandemic in Europe.

== International record ==
Season	Achievement	Notes
EuroLeague
1964–65	Quarter-finals	eliminated by Real Madrid, 65–83 (L) in Villeurbanne and 65–84 (L) in Madrid
1966–67	Quarter-finals	4th place in a group with Simmenthal Milano, AŠK Olimpija and Racing Mechelen
1969–70	Quarter-finals	3rd place in a group with CSKA Moscow, Ignis Varese and Crvena zvezda
1975–76	Semi-finals	eliminated by Real Madrid, 77–113 (L) in Madrid and 101–99 (W) in Villeurbanne
1977–78	Semi-final group stage	3rd place in a group with Real Madrid, Mobilgirgi Varese, Maccabi Tel Aviv, Jugoplastika and Alvik
1996–97	Final Four	4th place in Rome, lost to FC Barcelona 70–77 in the semi-final, lost to Smelt Olimpija 79–86 in the 3rd place game
1998–99	Quarter-finals	eliminated 2–0 by Olympiacos, 57–70 (L) in Piraeus and 77–81 (L) in Villeurbanne
1999–00	Quarter-finals	eliminated 2–1 by Efes Pilsen, 85–93 (L) in Istanbul, 77–60 (W) in Villeurbanne and 66-68 (L) in Istanbul
2000–01	Quarter-finals	eliminated 2–0 by CSKA Moscow, 63–78 (L) in Moscow and 76–82 (L) in Villeurbanne
FIBA Saporta Cup
1967–68	Quarter-finals	eliminated by Ignis Varese, 88–73 (W) in Villeurbanne and 51–70 (L) in Varese
1976–77	Quarter-finals	4th place in a group with Forst Cantù, Juventud Schweppes and Steaua București
1978–79	Quarter-finals	3rd place in a group with EBBC, Gabetti Cantù and Śląsk Wrocław
1982–83	Final	lost to Scavolini Pesaro 99–111 in the final (Palma de Mallorca)
1984–85	Semi-finals	eliminated by Žalgiris, 78–84 (L) in Kaunas and 93–88 (W) in Villeurbanne
1986–87	Semi-finals	eliminated by Cibona, 82–98 (L) in Villeurbanne and 93–109 (L) in Zagreb
1997–98	Quarter-finals	eliminated by Stefanel Milano, 58–67 (L) in Villeurbanne and 70–62 (W) in Milan
FIBA Korać Cup
1973–74	Semi-finals	eliminated by Forst Cantù, 68–99 (L) in Cantù and 94–76 (W) in Villeurbanne
1995–96	Semi-finals	eliminated by Stefanel Milano, 69–73 (L) in Milan and 72–81 (L) in Villeurbanne
EuroCup
2005–06	Quarter-finals	eliminated by Aris TT Bank, 60–67 (L) in Villeurbanne and 67–77 (L) in Thessaloniki

== Players ==
=== Roster ===
LDLC ASVEL roster
Players
Coaches

Pos.	No.	Nat.	Name	Ht.	Wt.	Age
G/F	0	(United States)	Cale, Myles	1.98 m (6 ft 6 in)	95 kg (209 lb)	27 – 5 March 1999
PG	1	(France)	Fodzo Dada, Marc-Owen	1.90 m (6 ft 3 in)	80 kg (176 lb)	20 – 11 November 2006
PG	3	(United States)	Washington Jr., TyTy	1.92 m (6 ft 4 in)	88 kg (194 lb)	25 – 15 November 2001
PG	7	(France)	Sanz, Lorenz (Y)	1.87 m (6 ft 2 in)	72 kg (159 lb)	17 – 24 September 2009
G	8	(Australia)	Mills, Patty	1.85 m (6 ft 1 in)	82 kg (181 lb)	38 – 11 August 1988
C	10	(France)	Massa, Bodian	2.08 m (6 ft 10 in)	95 kg (209 lb)	29 – 21 October 1997
SG	11	(France)	Jackson, Edwin	1.91 m (6 ft 3 in)	91 kg (201 lb)	37 – 18 September 1989
F/C	12	(France)	Dossou-Yovo, Mathis	2.06 m (6 ft 9 in)	108 kg (238 lb)	26 – 6 November 2000
F	14	(South Sudan)	Gach, Both	2.01 m (6 ft 7 in)	88 kg (194 lb)	27 – 4 February 1999
C	21	(Russia)	Bolomboy, Joel (injured)	2.06 m (6 ft 9 in)	104 kg (229 lb)	32 – 28 January 1994
F	23	(United States)	Lighty, David (C)	1.99 m (6 ft 6 in)	98 kg (216 lb)	38 – 27 May 1988
G/F	25	(France)	Besson, Hugo	1.94 m (6 ft 4 in)	89 kg (196 lb)	25 – 26 April 2001
G/F	35	(France)	Pons, Yves (injured)	1.96 m (6 ft 5 in)	98 kg (216 lb)	27 – 7 May 1999
PG	51	(Puerto Rico)	Waters, Tremont	1.80 m (5 ft 11 in)	79 kg (174 lb)	28 – 10 January 1998
F/C	77	(North Macedonia)	Sestina, Nate	2.06 m (6 ft 9 in)	106 kg (234 lb)	29 – 12 May 1997
F/C	93	(France)	Bassoumba, Yohan (Y)	2.01 m (6 ft 7 in)	110 kg (243 lb)	16 – 18 December 2009
F	99	(United States)	Crowder, Jae	1.99 m (6 ft 6 in)	107 kg (236 lb)	36 – 6 July 1990

Head coach

- (France) Tony Parker

Assistant coach(es)

- (France) Vincent Collet
- (France) Dounia Issa
- (France) Bryan George
- (France) Antoine Chevrier
- (France) Guillaume Soares

Legend

- (C) Team captain
- Injured

- Roster
- Transactions
Updated: 7 November 2026

=== Depth chart ===
Pos.	Starting 5	Bench 1	Bench 2	Bench 3	Inactive
C	Mathis Dossou-Yovo †	Bodian Massa †			Joel Bolomboy ° (injured)
PF	Jae Crowder *	Nate Sestina °	Yohan Bassoumba ‡
SF	Both Gach ^	David Lighty *		Myles Cale *
SG	Patty Mills *	Hugo Besson †	Edwin Jackson †	Lorenz Sanz ‡	Yves Pons † (injured)
PG	Marc-Owen Fodzo Dada †	Tremont Waters *		TyTy Washington Jr. *

Notes: The LNB Élite strictly enforces a "JFL" (Joueur Formé Localement) system to protect domestic talent, alongside limits on international transfers. Blue † – JFL player; (Note: A JFL player is a player that played for at least three years between the ages of 12 and 21 on a French team. To qualify as a JFL, a player does not necessarily need French citizenship but must have spent at least three seasons training in a French club’s youth academy system between the ages of 12 and 21. Minimum of 4 JFL players must be included on the active roster. In EuroLeague, the team did not have any limitations regarding the number of JFL players.) Red * – foreign player; (Note: A foreign player is a player from outside France. Maximum of 4 "Foreigners" (Non-EU / Non-Cotonou) are allowed. Players from the United States or Canada typically fall under this category.) Purple °; – Cotonou player (Note: "Cotonou+" players: Players holding passports from European Union nations or countries party to the Cotonou Agreement do not count against the 4-"Foreigner" cap, but they do count toward the overall 6 non-JFL maximum. In EuroLeague, the team did not have any limitations regarding the number of Cotonou players.) Gold ^; – non-JFL player (Note: "Non-JFL" players: players who do not qualify as "Locally Trained" (Joueur Formé Localement) under French basketball regulations. A maximum of 6 non-JFL players are allowed on a game sheet.) Green ‡ – youth player (Note: "Youth" players: players who are under the age of 20. In LNB Élite, there is no strict mandatory minimum requirement forcing teams to put youth players on their active 12-man game sheet. However, the league uses a highly integrated structure that connects senior squads directly to youth development through the "Espoirs" (U21) system.)

=== Players out on loan ===
Players out on loan
Nat.	Player	Position	Team	On loan since	Source
(United States)	Armoni Brooks	SG	(Spain) Valencia Basket	3 August 2026	
(Germany)	Nick Weiler-Babb	GF	(Serbia) Crvena zvezda	9 August 2026	

=== Retired numbers ===
ASVEL Basket retired numbers
No.	Player	Position	Tenure
4	Alain Gilles	G	1965–1986
4	Delaney Rudd	G	1993–1999
5	Amara Sy	G	1999–2002, 2005–2007, 2008–2009, 2012–2015

=== Notable players ===
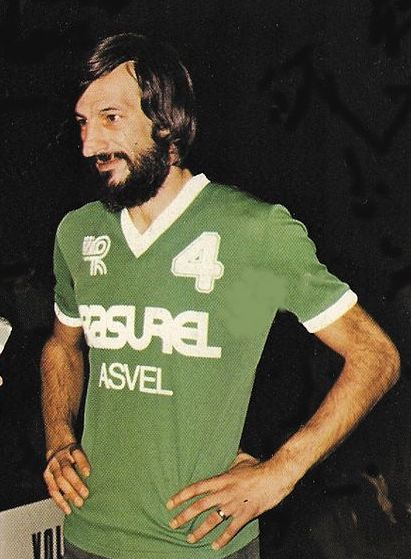
Alain Gilles played 21 years with the club, and coached the team for 9 years.

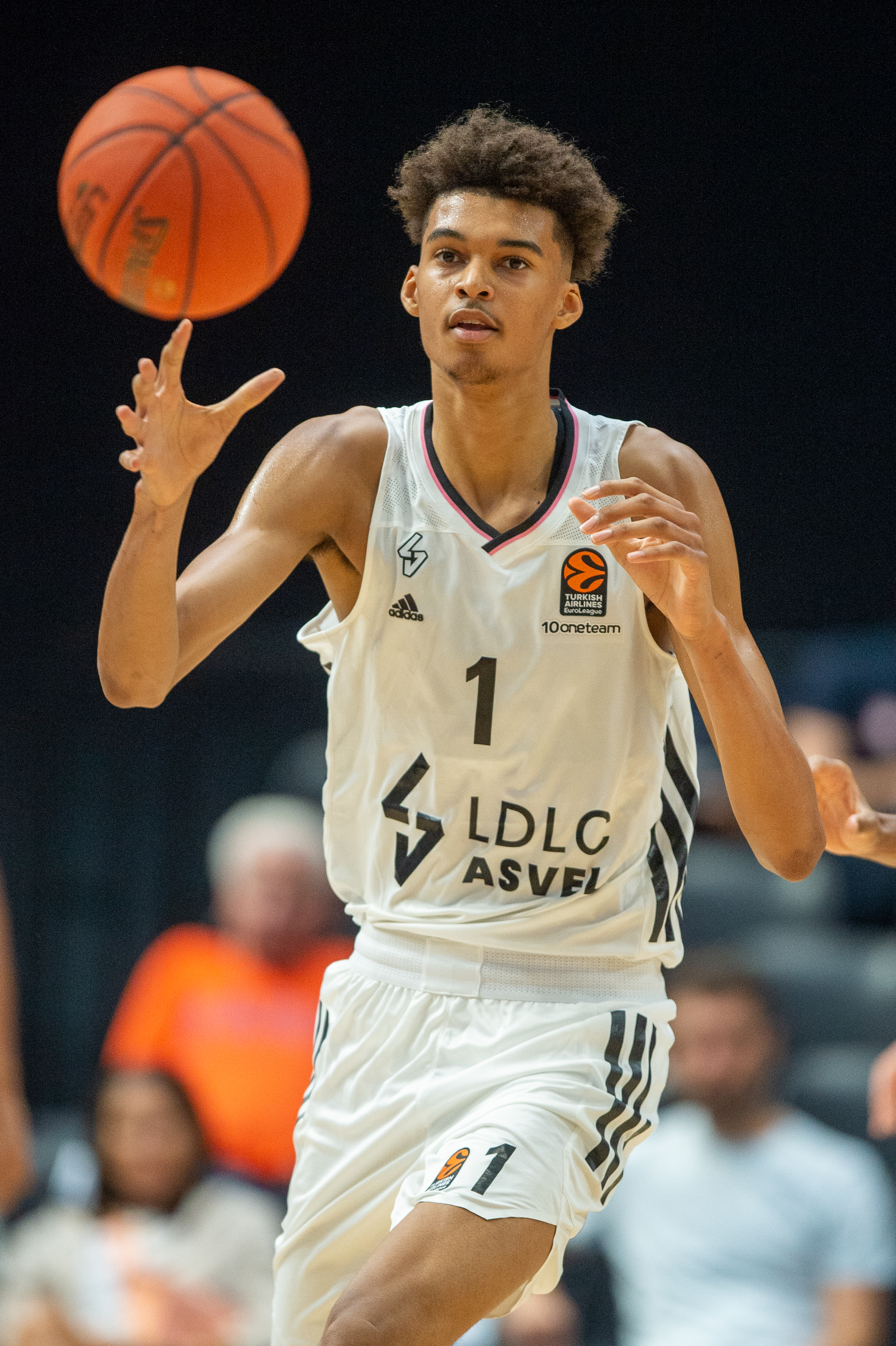
Victor Wembanyama who won the LNB Pro A Best Young Player in 2022 and the great top prospects in the 2023 NBA draft where he was selected first overall pick by the San Antonio Spurs.

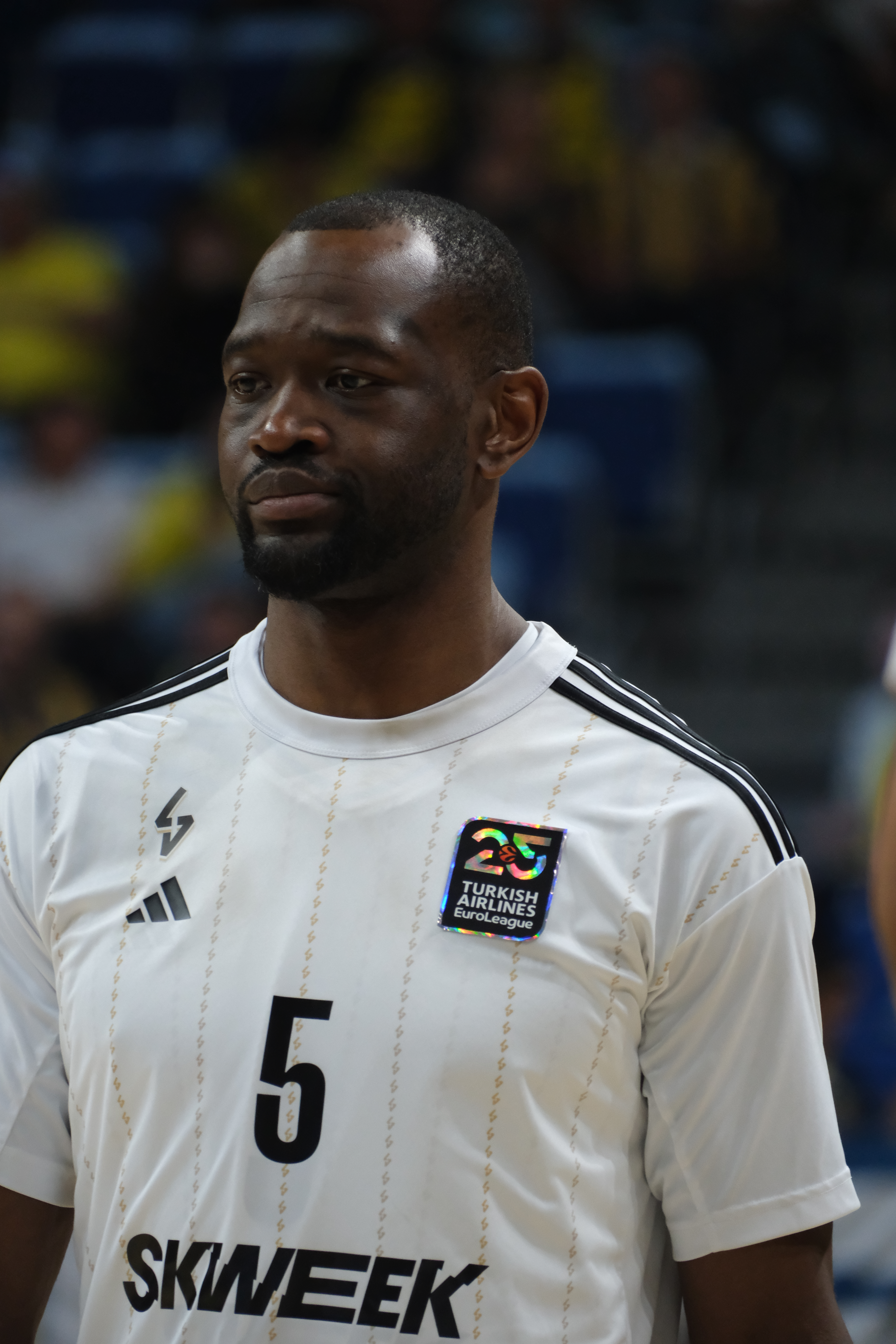
Charles Kahudi

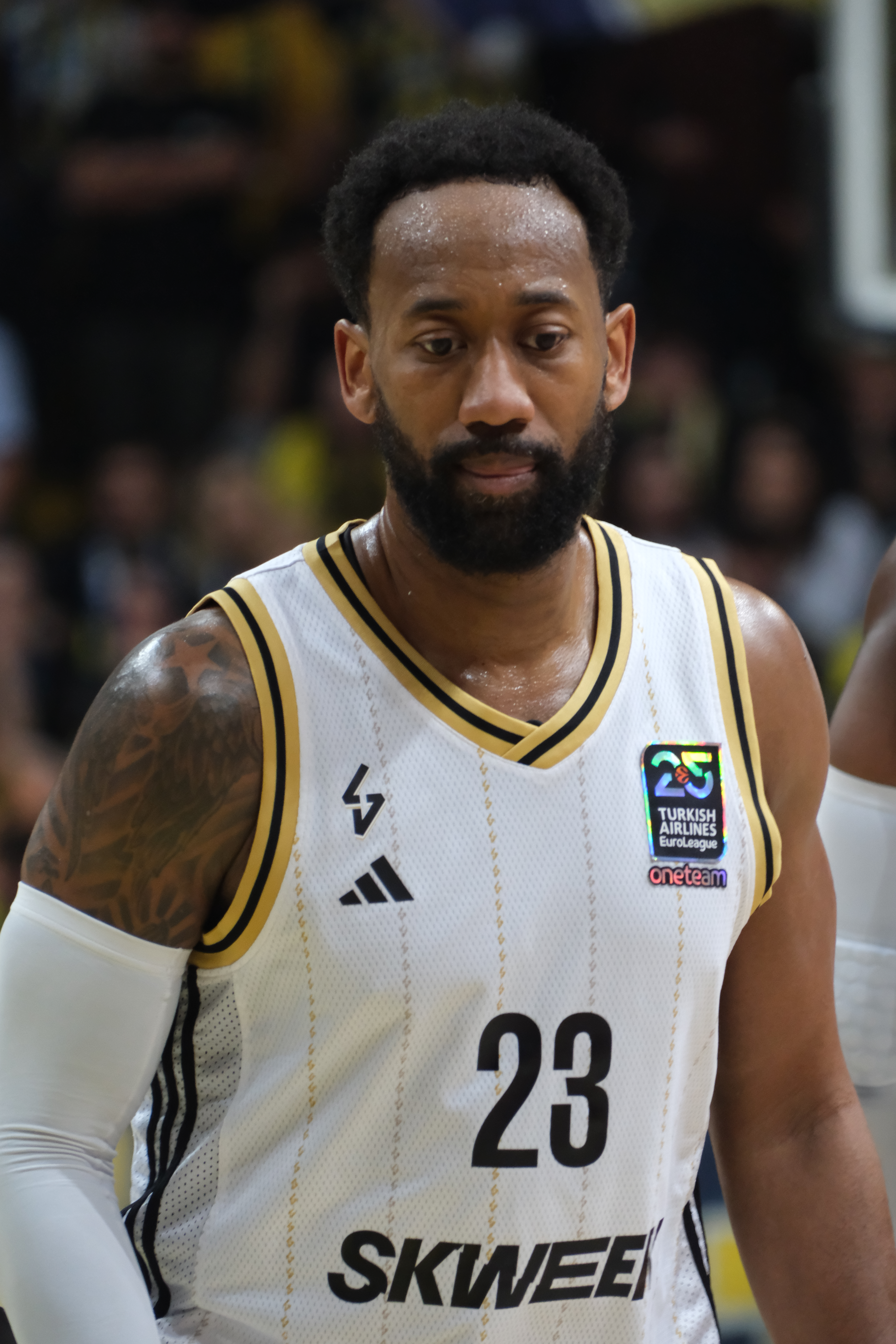
David Lighty

Note: Flags indicate national team eligibility at FIBA-sanctioned events. Players may hold other non-FIBA nationalities not displayed.

Criteria

To appear in this section a player must have either:

- Set a club record or won an individual award while at the club
- Played at least one official international match for their national team at any time
- Played at least one official NBA match at any time.

- (France) Juhann Begarin
- (France) Éric Beugnot
- (France) Jim Bilba
- (France) Yann Bonato
- (France) André Buffière
- (France) (Mali) Nouha Diakité
- (France) Alain Digbeu
- (France) Antoine Diot
- (France) Makan Dioumassi
- (France) Boris Dallo
- (France) Nando de Colo
- (France) Antoine Eito
- (France) Moustapha Fall
- (France) Marc-Owen Fodzo Dada
- (France) (Senegal) Youssoupha Fall
- (France) Laurent Foirest
- (France) Mickaël Gelabale
- (France) Alain Gilles
- (France) Henri Grange
- (France) Thomas Heurtel
- (France) William Howard
- (France) Edwin Jackson
- (France) Livio Jean-Charles
- (France) Paul Lacombe
- (France) Charles Lombahe-Kahudi
- (France) Timothé Luwawu-Cabarrot
- (France) Théo Maledon
- (France) Jacques Monclar
- (France) Ferenc Németh
- (France) Amine Noua
- (France) Élie Okobo
- (France) Tony Parker
- (France) Yves Pons
- (France) Henri Rey
- (France) Zaccharie Risacher
- (France) (Israel) Arthur Rozenfeld
- (France) Yohann Sangaré
- (France) Laurent Sciarra
- (France) Matthew Strazel
- (France) Gérard Sturla
- (France) (Mali) Amara Sy
- (France) Philip Szanyiel
- (France) Kim Tillie
- (France) Ali Traoré
- (France) Armel Traoré
- (France) Ronny Turiaf
- (France) Saint-Ange Vebobe
- (France) Victor Wembanyama
- (France) Léo Westermann
- (France) Guerschon Yabusele
- (Belgium) Ismaël Bako
- (Belgium) Retin Obasohan
- (Greece) Kostas Antetokounmpo
- (Israel) (Denmark) Noam Yaacov
- (Italy) Nikola Radulović
- (Croatia) Nikola Vujčić
- (Croatia) Miro Bilan
- (Croatia) Andrija Žižić
- (Hungary) François Németh
- (Estonia) Kristjan Kangur
- (Lithuania) Rolandas Alijevas
- (Lithuania) Mantas Kalnietis
- (Lithuania) Mindaugas Lukauskis
- (Serbia) Marko Kešelj
- (Serbia) Nikola Radulović
- (Turkey) Hüseyin Beşok
- (United Kingdom) Steve Bucknall
- (United Kingdom) Pops Mensah-Bonsu
- (Nigeria) Tonye Jekiri
- (Australia) David Andersen
- (Australia) Patty Mills
- (Jamaica) Adrian Uter
- (Canada) Rowan Barrett
- (Puerto Rico) (United States Virgin Islands) Walter Hodge
- (United States) Hilton Armstrong
- (United States) Tarik Black
- (United States) Lawrence Boston
- (United States) Eric Campbell
- (United States) John Celestand
- (United States) Norris Cole
- (United States) Corey Crowder
- (United States) (Turkey) Bobby Dixon
- (United States) Charles Gaines
- (United States) James Gist
- (United States) Shaquille Harrison
- (United States) Brian Howard
- (United States) Frank Jackson
- (United States) Jaren Jackson
- (United States) (Armenia) Chris Jones
- (United States) Marcos Knight
- (United States) (Republic of Ireland) Jay Larranaga
- (United States) (Cameroon) Paris Lee
- (United States) David Lighty
- (United States) Terrell Lyday
- (United States) (Guyana) Rawle Marshall
- (United States) Marlon Maxey
- (United States) (Brazil) Scott Machado
- (United States) Trenton Meacham
- (United States) Jay Murphy
- (United States) DeMarcus Nelson
- (United States) (Germany) Dylan Osetkowski
- (United States) Ahmad Nivins
- (United States) André Roberson
- (United States) Delaney Rudd
- (United States) Mike Scott
- (United States) (Poland) A. J. Slaughter
- (United States) (Israel) Alex Tyus
- (United States) Chevon Troutman
- (United States) Darryl Watkins
- (United States) Casper Ware
- (United States) Lamayn Wilson

== Head coaches ==
Tenure	Head Coach
1948–1955	(France) André Buffière
1955–1956	(France) Raymond Sahy
1956–1959	(France) Georges Darcy
1959–1960	(France) Raymond Sahy
1960–1963	(France) Gérard Sturla
1963	(France) Raymond Sahy
1963–1964	(France) Henri Rey
1964–1967	(Spain) Jesus Mercader
1967–1970	(France) Maurice Buffière
1970	(France) Michel Le Ray
1970–1972	(France) Jacques Caballé

Tenure	Head Coach
1972–1973	(Spain) Jesus Mercader
1973–1980	(France) André Buffière
1980–1989	(France) Alain Gilles
1989–1990	(France) Pierre Galle
1990–1991	(France) Dominique Richard
1991–1992	(France) Jean-Paul Rebatet
1992–2001	(France) Grégor Beugnot
2001–2002	(Federal Republic of Yugoslavia) Bogdan Tanjević
2002–2004	(France) Philippe Hervé
2004–2005	(Turkey) Erman Kunter
2005–2006	(France) Claude Bergeaud

Tenure	Head Coach
2006–2008	(France) Yves Baratet
2008–2010	(France) Vincent Collet
2010–2011	(France) Nordine Ghrib
2011–2014	(France) Pierre Vincent
2014	(France) Nordine Ghrib (interim head coach)
2014–2018	(Canada) (France) J. D. Jackson
2018	(France) T. J. Parker
2018–2020	(Montenegro) Zvezdan Mitrović
2020–2023	(France) T. J. Parker
2023–2024	(Italy) Gianmarco Pozzecco

== Club Presidents ==
Tenure	Club President
1948–1963	(France) Pierre Millet
1963–1988	(France) Raphaël de Barros
1988–1990	(France) Charles Hernu
1990	(France) Philippe Charvieux
1990–1992	(France) Gaston Charvieux
1992–2001	(France) Marc Lefebvre
2001–2014	(France) Gilles Moretton
2014–present	(France) Tony Parker

== Individual club records ==
Individual club record holders, while players of ASVEL.

Category	Player	Club Tenure	Record
Total Points Scored	(France) Alain Gilles	1965–86	6,141
Points Per Game	(United States) Norris Bell	1984–88	21.8
Total Assists	(United States) Delaney Rudd	1993–99	1,208
Assists Per Game	(United States) Delaney Rudd	1993–99	7.3
Total Rebounds	(United States) (France) Willie Redden	1983–92	1,472
Rebounds Per Game	(United States) (France) Willie Redden	1983–92	8.5
Games played	(France) Alain Gilles	1965–86	372

== ASVEL players with the most French League championships ==
ASVEL players with the most French League championships won, while members of the club.

Player	French Championships	Club Tenure
(France) Alain Gilles	8	1965–86
(France) Henri Grange	7	1955–69
(France) Raymond Sahy	6	1948–57
(France) Alain Durand	5	1963–72
(France) Henri Rey	5	1949–60
(France) Michel Duprez	5	1968–77
(France) Gilbert Lamothe	5	1959–71
(France) Bruno Recoura	5	1967–75
(France) André Buffière	4	1948–55
(France) Michel Le Ray	4	1967–73
(France) Gérard Sturla	4	1951–60
(France) Jean-Pierre Castellier	4	1963–69
(France) Gérard Moroze	4	1967–75

== Sponsors ==
- Groupe LDLC
