= 2014 Pro A Leaders Cup =

- Season: 2013–14
- Duration: 14–16 February 2014
- Games played: 7
- Teams: 8

Regular season
- Season MVP: (Brazil) João Paulo Batista

Finals
- Champions: Le Mans (3rd title)
- Runners-up: JSF Nanterre

The 2014 LNB Pro A Leaders Cup season was the 18th edition of this tournament, the second since it was renamed as Leaders Cup. The event included the eight top teams from the first half of the 2013–14 Pro A regular season and was played in Disneyland Paris. Le Mans won their third title after beating JSF Nanterre in the Final.

== Bracket ==
Quarterfinals
SIG Strasbourg	79
SLUC Nancy Basket	71
Limoges CSP	91
Le Mans	98
Orléans Loiret Basket	64
Paris-Levallois Basket	89
JDA Dijon	80
JSF Nanterre	86

Semifinals
SIG Strasbourg	74
Le Mans	89
Paris-Levallois Basket	73
JSF Nanterre	80

Finals
Le Mans	64
JSF Nanterre	59

== Final ==
February 16, 2014	Le Mans Sarthe	64–59	JSF Nanterre	Disneyland Paris
17:00 (UTC +1)	Scoring by quarter: 16–12, 16–15, 14–19, 18–13
	Pts: Batista 19; Rebs: Issa 8 Asts: Wood 5	Boxscore	Pts: Daniels 17; Rebs: Gladyr 11; Asts: Daniels 2 Lisch 2 Gladyr 2

MVP (Brazil) João Paulo Batista Game rules Game was played under FIBA rules. Arena Disneyland Paris 2014 Leaders Cup Winner Le Mans (3rd title)
