= 2020–21 French Basketball Cup =

- Season: 2020–21
- Duration: 21 September 2020 – 24 April 2021
- Teams: 64

Finals
- Champions: ASVEL
- Runners-up: Dijon

Awards
- Final MVP: (France) Moustapha Fall

The 2020–21 French Basketball Cup season (French: 2020–21 Coupe de France de Basket) was the 44th season of the domestic cup competition of French basketball.The previous year there was no winner since the competition was cancelled due to the COVID-19 pandemic. The competition started on 21 September 2020 and ended 24 April 2021. ASVEL Villeurbanne won the competition.

== Bracket ==
Round of 16
Dijon	79
Nanterre 92	65
Cholet Basket	78
SIG Strasbourg	82
Chorale Roanne Basket	74
Le Mans	96
Orléans Loiret Basket	83
AS Monaco	76
ASVEL	86
Bourg	77
Metropolitans 92	76
ADA Blois	59
Limoges CSP	99
STB Le Havre	69
BCM Gravelines-Dunkerque	104
Champagne Basket	100

Quarterfinals
Dijon	83
SIG Strasbourg	63
Le Mans	78
Orléans Loiret Basket	84
ASVEL	74
Metropolitans 92	73
Limoges CSP	72
BCM Gravelines-Dunkerque	65

Semifinals
Dijon	107
Orléans Loiret Basket	74
ASVEL	84
Limoges CSP	82

Final
Dijon	61
ASVEL	77

== Final ==
24 April 2021	Dijon	61–77	ASVEL	Paris
19:00 (CET)	Scoring by quarter: 14–16, 17–25, 18–18, 12–18
	Pts: Julien 16; Rebs: Vanwijn 6 Asts: Julien 6	Boxscore	Pts: Heurtel 18; Rebs: Fall 11; Asts: Heurtel 6	Arena: Accor Arena

== See also ==
- 2020–21 Pro A season
