= Livio Jean-Charles =

French basketball player (born 1993)

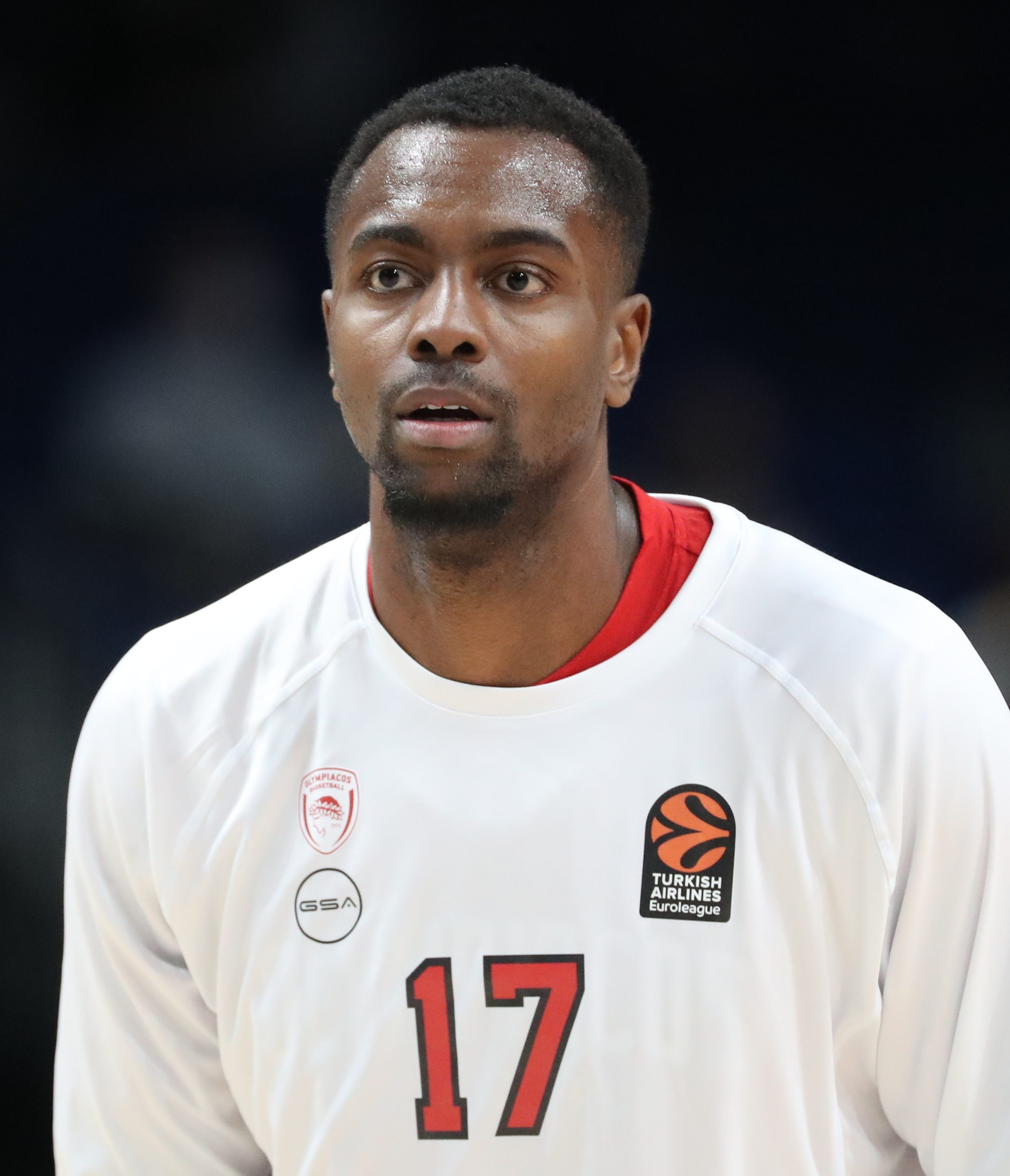
- Jean-Charles with Olympiacos, in 2022

No. 17 – CSKA Moscow
- Position: Center
- League: VTB United League

Personal information
- Born: 8 November 1993 (age 32) Cayenne, French Guiana, France
- Listed height: 6 ft 9 in (2.06 m)
- Listed weight: 230 lb (104 kg)

Career information
- NBA draft: 2013: 1st round, 28th overall pick
- Drafted by: San Antonio Spurs
- Playing career: 2011–present

Career history
- 2011–2016: ASVEL
- 2016–2017: Austin Spurs
- 2017: ASVEL
- 2017–2018: Austin Spurs
- 2018: Málaga
- 2018–2020: ASVEL
- 2020–2022: Olympiacos
- 2022–present: CSKA Moscow

Career highlights
- 3× VTB United League champion (2024–2026); 2× VTB United League Supercup winner (2024, 2025); All-VTB United League Second Team (2023); 2× Pro A champion (2016, 2019); French Cup winner (2019); All-French League First Team (2020); Pro A Rising Star Award (2013); EuroLeague Next Generation Tournament MVP (2010); Greek Cup winner (2022); Greek League winner (2022)
- Stats at Basketball Reference
Medals
Men's basketball
Representing France
U20 European Championship
Silver medal – second place	2012 Slovenia	Team

Livio Philippe Jean-Charles (born November 8, 1993) is a professional basketball player for CSKA Moscow of the VTB United League.

== Professional career ==
=== ASVEL (2011–2016) ===
Between 2009 and 2011, Jean-Charles played for Centre Fédéral in the French 3rd-tier level NM1 League. In 2011, Jean-Charles joined ASVEL of the professional French top-tier level LNB Pro A. In April 2013, he participated in the Nike Hoop Summit, where he was named the Most Outstanding Player, after a 27-point, 13-rebound effort, leading the World Team to a 112–98 win over the USA Junior Select Team.

On 27 June 2013 Jean-Charles was selected by the San Antonio Spurs with the 28th overall pick in the 2013 NBA draft.

Jean-Charles spent five seasons with ASVEL. In the 2015–16 season, he saw action in 25 games, averaging 5.9 points and 4.6 rebounds per game, in 21.2 minutes per game, while shooting .552 (64–116) from the field and .655 (19–29) from the foul line. In the playoffs, he appeared in 11 games, upping his averages to 7.5 points and 4.8 rebounds in 25.9 minutes per game, helping lead ASVEL to the French Pro A championship. He also made eight FIBA Europe Cup appearances, averaging 8.8 points, 6.3 rebounds, and 1.6 assists, in 23.9 minutes per game.

=== Austin Spurs (2016–2017) ===
In July 2016, Jean-Charles joined the Spurs for the 2016 NBA Summer League and on 22 July 2016 he signed with the San Antonio Spurs, but was waived on October 22 after appearing in five preseason games. Seven days later, he was acquired by the Austin Spurs of the NBA Development League as an affiliate of San Antonio.

=== Return to ASVEL (2017) ===
On 30 March 2017, Jean-Charles' return to ASVEL was announced. He signed for the remainder of the 2016–17 season.

=== Return to Austin (2017–2018) ===
On 2 November 2017 Jean-Charles was included in the 2017–18 opening night roster for Austin Spurs.

=== Unicaja (2018) ===
On 18 March 2018 Unicaja of the Liga ACB announced that they had signed Jean-Charles.

=== Third stint with ASVEL (2018–2020) ===
On 5 July 2018 ASVEL Basket of the LNB Pro A announced that they had signed Jean-Charles to a three-year contract.

=== Olympiacos (2020–2022) ===
On July 1, 2020, Olympiacos announced that they had signed a two-year contract with Jean-Charles.

=== CSKA (2022–present) ===
In July 2022, he left Olympiacos and signed a contract with PBC CSKA Moscow for one season with an option for an additional season. During the season he led them to a record of 24 victories in a row in the regular season of the VTB United League.

== National team career ==
Jean-Charles has represented the French under-20 national team at the 2012 FIBA Europe Under-20 Championship, and the 2013 FIBA Europe Under-20 Championship. At the 2013 FIBA Europe Under-20 Championship, he averaged 17.2 points, 6.3 rebounds, and 1.5 assists per game.

== Career statistics ==
Legend
GP	Games played	GS	Games started	MPG	Minutes per game
FG%	Field-goal percentage	3P%	3-point field-goal percentage	FT%	Free-throw percentage
RPG	Rebounds per game	APG	Assists per game	SPG	Steals per game
BPG	Blocks per game	PPG	Points per game	PIR	Performance index rating
**Bold**	Career high

=== EuroLeague ===
Year	Team	GP	GS	MPG	FG%	3P%	FT%	RPG	APG	SPG	BPG	PPG	PIR
2019–20	ASVEL	27	**19**	**21.1**	.505	**.313**	.872	**3.7**	.6	.4	**.7**	**9.1**	**8.9**
2020–21	Olympiakos	**29**	11	17.5	**.570**	.273	**.875**	3.2	.5	**.6**	**.7**	6.3	7.1
2021–22	Olympiakos	**29**	1	10.7	.556	**.313**	.667	2.2	**.7**	.4	.3	3.8	4.3
Career		85	31	16.3	.537	.299	.821	3.0	.6	.5	.5	6.3	6.7
