= Le Mans Sarthe Basket =

Basketball team, France

Le Mans
- Nickname: MSB
- Leagues: LNB Élite; EuroCup
- Founded: 1939; 87 years ago
- History: SCM Le Mans (1939–1993); Le Mans Sarthe Basket (1993–present)
- Arena: Antarès
- Capacity: 6,023
- Location: Le Mans, France
- Team colors: Orange, Grey, White
- President: Christophe Le Bouille
- Head coach: Guillaume Vizade
- Team captain: Will Yeguete
- Championships: 5 French Championships; 4 French Cup; 4 French League Cup
- Website: msb.fr
Home	Away

Le Mans Sarthe Basket, commonly known as MSB or Le Mans, is a professional basketball club that is from the city of Le Mans, France. The team plays in the LNB Élite and internationally in the EuroCup.

Established in 1939, the team has been a regular in the Pro A, as well as in European competitions. The team has won five national championships, four French Cups and four Leaders Cups.

== History ==
=== The Modern Sport Club (1939–1993) ===
In 1928, French businessmen, Léopold Gouloumés arrived at the city Mans and founded the food association: the Société des Comptoirs Modernes. Like many other industries at the time, him and Bernard Gasnal, founded their own sport club called Goulou Club in 1938. But in September 1939 the Second World War broke out and the men were needed to fight. With the male absent, women decided to persuade the Goulou Club into creating a basketball team for them.

In 1941, the French government prohibited sport clubs to use the name of an industry so the Goulou Club changed its name to Modern Sporting Club.

In 1952, Le Mans frills won the title of champions of France. Then following that success Bernard Gasnal founded a men's team. In 1963 the team joined the elite.

The following years from 1969 to 1970 was very successful, they won the French Cup in 1964 and the French League championship in 1978 and 1979.

After the euphoria of the European games, the club was struggling to survive due to the rising dominance of CSP Limoges and Pau-Orthez

The SCM existed after the MSB was created and was concerned about the amateur part of the association.

=== In continuation (since 2008) ===
The MSB finished third in the regular season and then lost to Orleans in the semifinals. They also won the "As" week (74-64 against Orleans in the final) and the French Cup (79-65 against Nancy in the final at Bercy). Alain Koffi, who started the club, is named the French MVP of the season. But in the Euroleague, the MSB came in last in their group again, winning only two of their ten games.

Despite the departure of several executives in the off season such as Alain Koffi or Nicolas Batum, the MSB plays always the leading roles in the league in 2009 – 2010 because after having a long time to be the first of the regular season, the club finally finished behind Cholet. The two teams meet in the championship final, but Cholet wins the derby at the top (81-65). Le Mans compete in the Eurocup but are eliminated on the wire in the first round. In 2014, the MSB won the Cup leaders.

Since 21 May 2014 the MSB has been trained by Turkish Erman Kunter, former coach of Cholet. He took over succession from JD Jackson. The season is mixed, particularly marked by a heavy defeat in the derby home against Cholet Basket (61-82). Committed in Eurochallenge, the MSB won their first two games against the Belgians from Antwerp Giants (72-66) and Finland KTP Basket (71-52) before a heavy on the floor of Pallacanestro Biella, Italian D2 club ( 82–64).

In 2025, Le Mans won its fourth Leaders Cup, tying the record by Élan Béarnais for most titles.

== The club and the society ==
The company was founded on September 6, 1993 as a local sports cooperative, and was chaired by Jean-Pierre Goisbault until June 30, 2008. Christophe Le Bouille became president on July 1, 2008. The club has a budget of €6,468,000 for the 2024/2025 season.

Furthermore, another structure dedicated to marketing, is also under the name of MSB Promotion. It is she who is responsible for the communication around the club's image.

== The coat of arms, the colors, and the supporters ==
The jersey worn by the players are tango and gray. Tango is inherited from the ancient Moderne Sporting Club.

The logo has existed since 1993 and the acquisition of the new professional status of the team. It uses the colors of the club, accompanied by three letters MSB (acronym of Le Mans Sarthe Basket) written in white. In the summer of 2009, the MSB changed the coat of arms and opted for a lion showing claws and out of the logo, symbol of the feline. The addition of an animal blasonnant the team who follow the custom of other French teams like Pau Orthez and Nancy.

The official group of supporters are called the felines. This exists in the form of an association and follows the club on certain displacements. They even give a reward to the most outstanding players called the reflection feline.

== Equipment manufacturers ==
1990/1992 : Reebok; 1992/1995 : Adidas; 1995/1996 : Converse; 1996/1998 : Reebok; 1998/2001 : Champion	2001/2005 : Fila; 2005/2008 : AND1; 2008/2014 : Reebok; 2014/2020 : Kappa; 2020/2022 : Skills	2022/en cours : Puma

== Derby History ==
The former Northwest Derby pitted SCM Le Mans against ABC Nantes.

Since 1986, the “Derby de l'Ouest” has pitted Le Mans against Cholet, located in Maine-et-Loire, every season. Since their first clash in the men's N1B division, the two teams have met regularly. Since the 1990–91 season, they have engaged in a fierce annual duel.

== Honours ==
=== Domestic competitions ===
- French League

Winners (5): 1977–78, 1978–79, 1981–82, 2005–06, 2017–18
Runners-up (4): 1979–80, 1980–81, 2009–10, 2011–12

- French Cup

Winners (4): 1964, 2004, 2008–09, 2015–16
Runners-up (5): 1970, 2016–17, 2018–19, 2024–25, 2025–26

- Leaders Cup

Winners (4): 2006, 2009, 2014, 2025
Runners-up (5): 2004, 2007, 2015, 2018, 2026

== Season by season ==
Season	Tier	League	Pos.	W–L	French Cup	Leaders Cup	European competitions	
2005–06	1	Pro A	1st			Champion	2 ULEB Cup	RS
2006–07	1	Pro A	6th	22–15		Runner-up	1 Euroleague	RS
2007–08	1	Pro A	3rd	26–9	Round of 16	Quarterfinalist	1 Euroleague	RS
2008–09	1	Pro A	3rd	23–12	Champion	Champion	1 Euroleague	RS
2009–10	1	Pro A	2nd	26–10	Round of 16	Quarterfinalist	2 Eurocup	L16
2010–11	1	Pro A	8th	14–18	Round of 16		2 Eurocup	L16
2011–12	1	Pro A	2nd	23–14	Quarterfinalist	Semifinalist	2 Eurocup	RS
2012–13	1	Pro A	6th	17–16	Round of 32	Semifinalist	2 Eurocup	RS
2013–14	1	Pro A	5th	19–13	Quarterfinalist	Champion	2 Eurocup	RS
2014–15	1	Pro A	3rd	21–19	Round of 16	Runner-up	3 EuroChallenge	QF
2015–16	1	Pro A	3rd	25–15	Champion	Quarterfinalist	2 Eurocup	RS
2016–17	1	Pro A	12th	14–20	Runner-up		3 Champions League	R16
2017–18	1	Pro A	1st	29–18	Round of 32	Runner-up		
2018–19	1	Pro A	8th	21–16	Runner-up		3 Champions League	R16
2019–20	1	Pro A	9th^{1}	11–14	—			
2020–21	1	Pro A	7th	19–16	Quarterfinalist			
2021–22	1	Pro A	9th	17–17	Round of 32		3 Champions League	2QR
2022–23	1	Pro A	6th	19–17	Semifinalist	Semifinalist		
2023–24	1	Élite	11th	15–19	Round of 32	Quarterfinalist	3 Champions League	PI
2024–25	1	Élite	6th	18–12	Runner-up	Champion		
2025–26	1	Élite	6th	19-11	Runner-up	Runner-up	3 Champions League	R16

^1 Cancelled due to the COVID-19 pandemic in Europe.

== Players ==
=== Current roster ===
Note: Flags indicate national team eligibility at FIBA-sanctioned events. Players may hold other non-FIBA nationalities not displayed.

Le Mans Sarthe Basket roster
Players
Coaches

Pos.	No.	Nat.	Name	Ht.	Wt.	Age
G	0	(United States)	Stewart Jr., Carlos	1.85 m (6 ft 1 in)		23 – 6 May 2003
G	1	(France)	Grasshoff, Bastien	1.98 m (6 ft 6 in)		19 – 1 June 2007
PG	2	(United States)	King, Jordan	1.83 m (6 ft 0 in)		25 – 2 March 2001
PG	3	(France)	Cognet, Afeny	1.86 m (6 ft 1 in)		18 – 27 January 2008
SF	8	(France)	Ajinça, Melvin	2.03 m (6 ft 8 in)		22 – 26 June 2004
G	9	(France)	Delaunay, Leopold	1.93 m (6 ft 4 in)		24 – 14 November 2001
G	10	(France)	Doumbia Niang, Ugo	1.91 m (6 ft 3 in)		23 – 16 February 2003
PF	15	(France)	Yeguete, Will	2.01 m (6 ft 7 in)		35 – 16 October 1991
F	23	(United States)	Wood, Moses	2.03 m (6 ft 8 in)		27 – 3 May 1999
C	26	(France)	Beracou, Tyler	2.02 m (6 ft 8 in)		20 – 12 October 2006
PF	32	(France)	Dufeal, Lucas	1.98 m (6 ft 6 in)		23 – 18 April 2003
F	35	(United States)	Thomas, TaShawn	2.03 m (6 ft 8 in)		33 – 27 February 1993
F/C	77	(Netherlands)	Kuta, Nathan	2.04 m (6 ft 8 in)		26 – 28 April 2000
F	88	(France)	Diaby-Cisse, Madiba	1.98 m (6 ft 6 in)		18 – 7 October 2008
F	93	(France)	Penda, Swann	2.02 m (6 ft 8 in)		18 – 12 February 2008

Head coach

- (France) Guillaume Vizade

Assistant coach(es)

- (France) Antoine Methieu
- (France) Jordan Bernard
- (United States) KJ Smith

Legend

- (C) Team captain
- Injured

- Roster
Updated: October 3, 2026

== Notable players ==
Note: Flags indicate national team eligibility at FIBA-sanctioned events. Players may hold other non-FIBA nationalities not displayed.

Criteria

To appear in this section a player must have either:

- Set a club record or won an individual award while at the club
- Played at least one official international match for their national team at any time
- Played at least one official NBA match at any time.

- (France) Pape Badiane
- (France) Nicolas Batum
- (France) Rodrigue Beaubois
- (France) Éric Beugnot
- (France) Grégor Beugnot
- (France) Yannick Bokolo
- (France) Nobel Boungou Colo
- (France) Petr Cornelie
- (France) Vincent Collet
- (France) Antoine Diot
- (France) Makan Dioumassi
- (France) Hervé Dubuisson
- (France) Youssoupha Fall
- (France) Claude Gasnal
- (France) Mickaël Gelabale
- (France) Charles Kahudi
- (France) Alain Koffi
- (France) Lahaou Konaté
- (France) Jérémy Leloup
- (France) Noah Penda
- (France) Thierry Rupert
- (France) Amara Sy
- (France) Pape Sy
- (France) Terry Tarpey
- (France) Will Yeguete
- (Belgium) Jonathan Tabu
- (Benin) Mouphtaou Yarou
- (Bosnia and Herzegovina) Zack Wright
- (Brazil) João Paulo Batista
- (Canada) Olivier Hanlan
- (Canada) J.D. Jackson
- (Ivory Coast) Pape-Philippe Amagou
- (Croatia) Sandro Nicević
- (Croatia) Mate Skelin
- (Finland) Gerald Lee
- (Georgia (country)) Taurean Green
- (Greece) Michalis Kakiouzis
- (Israel) David Blu
- (Israel) Ido Kozikaro
- (Israel) Raviv Limonad
- (North Macedonia) Richard Hendrix
- (North Macedonia) Romeo Travis
- (Montenegro) Nebojša Bogavac
- (Montenegro) Justin Cobbs
- (Montenegro) Taylor Rochestie
- (Nigeria) Obi Emegano
- (Poland) Michał Ignerski
- (Lithuania) Egidijus Mockevičius
- (Serbia) Luka Bogdanović
- (Serbia) Marko Kešelj
- (Turkey) Hüseyin Beşok
- (Turkey) Bobby Dixon
- (Turkey) İzzet Türkyılmaz
- (United States) Alex Acker
- (United States) Eric Campbell
- (United States) Brian Chase
- (United States) Sam Clancy
- (United States) Cameron Clark
- (United States) Robert Dozier
- (United States) Khalid El-Amin
- (United States) Daniel Ewing
- (United States) Taurean Green
- (United States) Kenny Gregory
- (United States) Jermaine Guice
- (United States) Rico Hill
- (United States) Dennis Hopson
- (United States) Trevor Hudgins
- (United States) Keith Jennings
- (United States) Arthur Kenney
- (United States) Darius Johnson-Odom
- (United States) Larry Lawrence
- (United States) Chris Lofton
- (United States) Matt Morgan
- (United States) Ryan Pearson
- (United States) Hollis Price
- (United States) Mykal Riley
- (United States) Marc Salyers
- (United States) Dewarick Spencer
- (United States) D.J. Stephens
- (United States) Michael Thompson
- (United States) Darius Washington
- (United States) DaShaun Wood
- (United States) Zack Wright
- (United States Virgin Islands) Cuthbert Victor

== Head coaches ==
- (France) André Buffière
- (United States) Bill Sweek
- (France) Vincent Collet
- (France) J. D. Jackson
- (France) (Turkey) Erman Kunter
