= France men's national basketball team =

Men's national basketball team representing France

France
- FIBA ranking: 3 ▲1 (1 September 2026)
- Joined FIBA: 1933
- FIBA zone: FIBA Europe
- National federation: FFBB
- Coach: Frédéric Fauthoux
- Nickname: Les Bleus (The Blues)

Olympic Games
- Appearances: 11
- Medals: (silver) Silver: (1948, 2000, 2020, 2024)

FIBA World Cup
- Appearances: 9
- Medals: (bronze) Bronze: (2014, 2019)

EuroBasket
- Appearances: 40
- Medals: (gold) Gold: (2013); (silver) Silver: (1949, 2011, 2022); (bronze) Bronze: (1937, 1951, 1953, 1959, 2005, 2015)
- Retired numbers: 1 (9)
First	Second

First international
- Italy 23–17 France (Milan, Italy; 4 April 1926)

Biggest win
- France 100–6 Austria (Prague, Czechoslovakia; 28 April 1947)

Biggest defeat
- United States 120–62 France (Los Angeles, California, US; 3 August 1984)

The France men's national basketball team (French: Équipe de France de basketball) represents France in international basketball and is administered by the French Federation of Basketball. France is currently ranked fourth in the FIBA World Ranking (highest ranking: 3rd between 2017 and 2019).

France has been a regular at the EuroBasket, making 40 appearances all-time. Their best finish came in 2013, winning the gold medal. They have also come away with three silver (1949, 2011, 2022) and six bronze medals (1937, 1951, 1953, 1959, 2005, 2015). France has also won two bronze medals at the FIBA World Cup in 2014 and 2019. While at the Summer Olympics, France has won four silver medals (1948, 2000, 2020, 2024).

== History ==
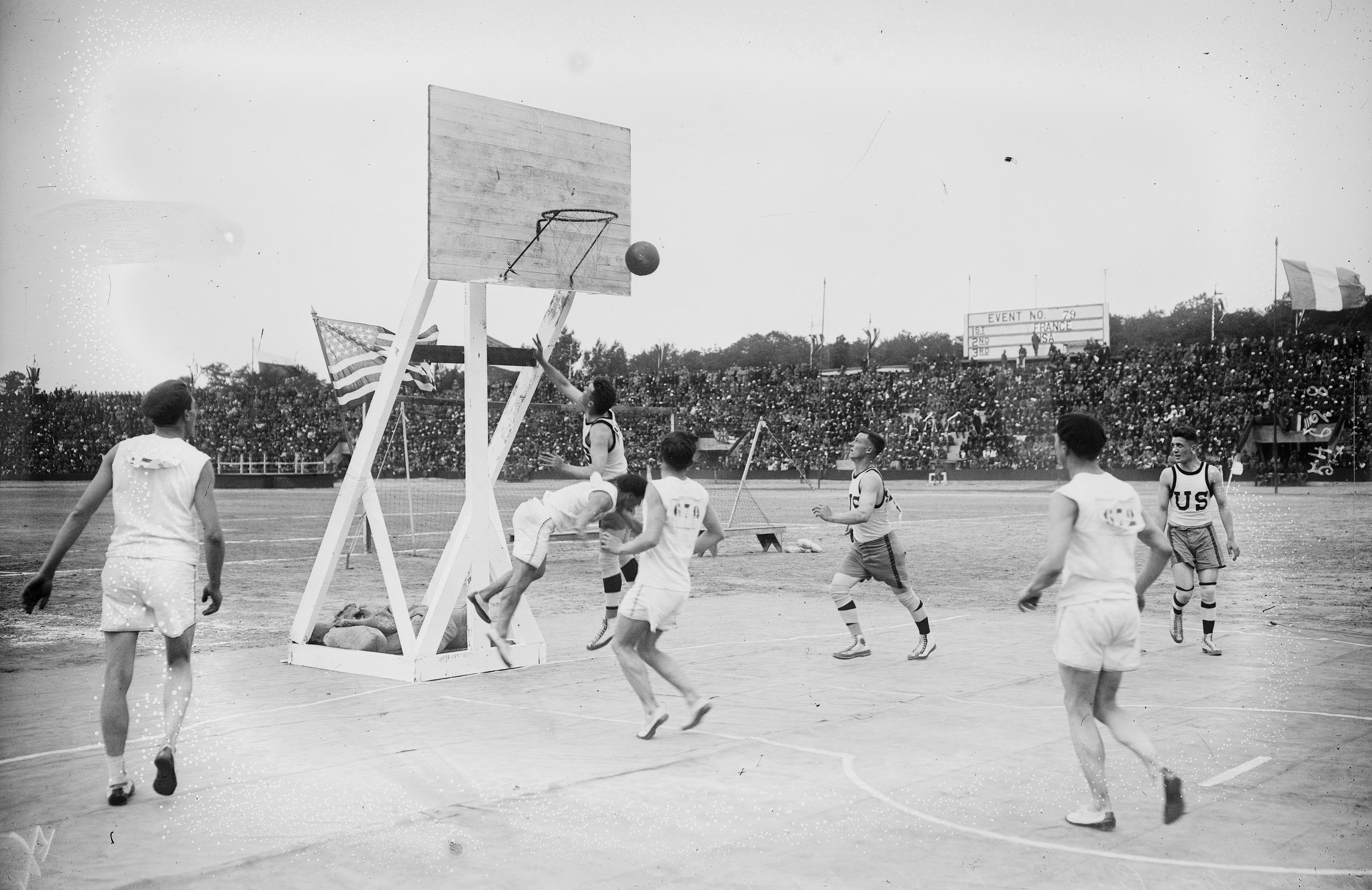
France national team in 1919

=== Rise and decline (1919–1979) ===
Throughout its history, France's national basketball team has experienced many ups and downs. The time periods where the national team earned medals have been quite streaky.

In Europe, team France started out as a fierce competitor. The team won five medals at the EuroBasket between 1937 and 1959.
1937: Bronze Medal, 3–2 overall, second in preliminary group, lost semi-final, won bronze medal match
1949: Silver Medal, 5–1 overall, round robin tournament, no playoffs
1951: Bronze Medal; 6–3 overall, second in preliminary group at 3–1, won semi-final group in three-way tie-breaker with 2–1 record, lost semi-final, won bronze medal match
1953: Bronze Medal, 6–4 overall, second in preliminary group at 2–1, second position of four-way tiebreaker for 2nd place in final round with 4–3 record
1959: Bronze Medal, 6–3 overall, second in preliminary group at 3–1, first in semi-final round at 3–0, third in final round with 1–2 record.

Their period of glory on the world stage began in the late 1940s / early 1950s. At the 1948 Olympics in London, the France team led by Robert Busnel won an Olympic silver medal, the first Olympic medal in their history. France finished second only to the United States.

In the wake of this Olympic medal, France, led by captain André Vacheresse won three consecutive medals. Including silver at the EuroBasket in 1949, and bronze in 1951 and 1953 respectively.

The following years were less glorious. France's basketball team seemingly declined gradually, to completely fail to medal at major international competitions during the 1960s and 1970s.

=== Generation of hope (1980–1989) ===
After the disappointing 60s and 70s, the 1980s were marked by a generation of hope, counting in its ranks French basketball icons such as Richard Dacoury, Stéphane Ostrowski, and Hervé Dubuisson. During this decade, France returned to the Olympics in 1984, and the World Cup in 1986.

=== Success and struggle (1990–2000) ===
During the 1990s France had their moments to shine, despite some internal struggles and many injuries to key players. At the European championship, the team did not win a medal despite some good performances. The years 1999 and 2000, however, marked a turnaround for French basketball. The team built around Antoine Rigaudeau, Tariq Abdul-Wahad, Laurent Sciarra, Jim Bilba, and Laurent Foirest finished in the top 4 at the EuroBasket 1999, which France hosted. Their first loss was in the semi-finals followed by their second loss in the bronze medal match to FR Yugoslavia 74–62, despite some internal problems that disrupted the group of players. In 2000, team France qualified for the 2000 Summer Olympics in Sydney, full of ambition, which developed the means for major achievement. At the end of their stint in Australia, the selection of coach Jean-Pierre de Vincenzi helped lead the team to the silver medal, France's first top 3 performance at a major basketball event in 46 years and their first Olympic medal in 52 years.

=== Tony Parker joins the team (2001) ===
After the 2000 Olympics, French phenom Tony Parker was selected by the San Antonio Spurs in the 2001 NBA draft. However, at the EuroBasket 2001, without Antoine Rigaudeau, who surprisingly decided to retire from the national team, the 19-year-old Parker alone was not enough as France failed to repeat their outstanding performance attained at the 2000 Olympic Games. France lost in the quarter-finals to Germany 77–81 and finished in 6th place overall. During this time, most of France's players cleared their spots for a new generation of players, which were available in abundance as the France Junior national team had won the 2000 junior championship.

=== Setback despite abundance of talent (2003) ===
At the EuroBasket 2003, France competed with NBA players Tony Parker, Jérôme Moïso, and Tariq Abdul-Wahad, future pro Boris Diaw, and European standouts Laurent Foirest, Cyril Julian, and Florent Piétrus. France ended up losing in the semi-finals against Lithuania before going on to lose a close game in the bronze medal match against Italy 67–69.

=== Restructuring and improved performance (2005) ===
Hoping not to repeat the disappointing performance of 2003, France's squad once again saw considerable changes heading into EuroBasket 2005. Reconstruction of the national team roster was built based on team chemistry instead of big names; Amongst others, Jérôme Moïso and Tariq Abdul-Wahad disappeared from the roster with the newly formed team being built around the three NBA players Tony Parker, Boris Diaw, and Mickaël Piétrus as well as the returning national team veteran Antoine Rigaudeau. The new coach Claude Bergeaud, surprisingly also selected Frédéric Weis, an underachieving player once drafted in the 1999 NBA draft, who did not participate in the team's preparation. After a sobering preliminary round, France displayed stunning performances in the knockout stage. First, France eliminated Serbia and Montenegro on their home court, then the team defeated the 2003 European champion Lithuania. Heading into their semi-finals match against Greece, where both sides battled each other throughout with tough defense, France collapsed in the final minute after leading by seven points with 45 seconds remaining in regulation. The devastating loss relegated the national team to the bronze medal match once again. However, unlike 2003 France recovered to win the bronze medal by blowing out Spain 98–68.

=== Continued title aspirations (2006–2010) ===
At the 2006 FIBA World Cup France competed without Tony Parker, who suffered a twisted finger two days before the competition. Because of this, the San Antonio Spurs, who just signed Parker to a 51 million Euros contract did not allow him to participate. After a preliminary round marked by three wins and two losses, including a shocking defeat at the hands of Lebanon, France beat Angola in the Round of 16 match 68–62 before losing in the quarter-finals against Greece 56–73. Furthermore, two victories in classification matches finally granted the French fifth place.

At the EuroBasket 2007, France fell behind their aspirations again. After a strong preliminary round, the team was eliminated in the quarter-finals by eventual champion Russia 75–71, then was beaten in the classification matches by Croatia 86–69 and Slovenia 88–74, finishing in eighth place, missing out on the Olympic Games for the second consecutive time. In the following months, the team had to go through the ordeal of qualifications to participate in the next EuroBasket which was to be held in 2009. In 2008, former national team coach Michel Gomez returned to lead the team, a position he held between 1993 and 1995. But Gomez failed to help France qualify directly for the European Championship, and had to enter a repechage tournament. In March 2009 he was replaced by Vincent Collet, coach of ASVEL Lyon-Villeurbanne.

Under Collet's direction, Les Bleus grabbed the last ticket to the EuroBasket 2009 by trashing Belgium 92–54 in the final game of the repechage. At the European Championship, France won their first six games of the first two rounds but failed in the quarter-finals against the eventual tournament champion Spain. The French ultimately finished in fifth place, a performance which would grant the team the direct qualification for the next two major competitions, the 2010 FIBA World Cup and EuroBasket 2011.

=== Rise to the world elite (2011–present) ===
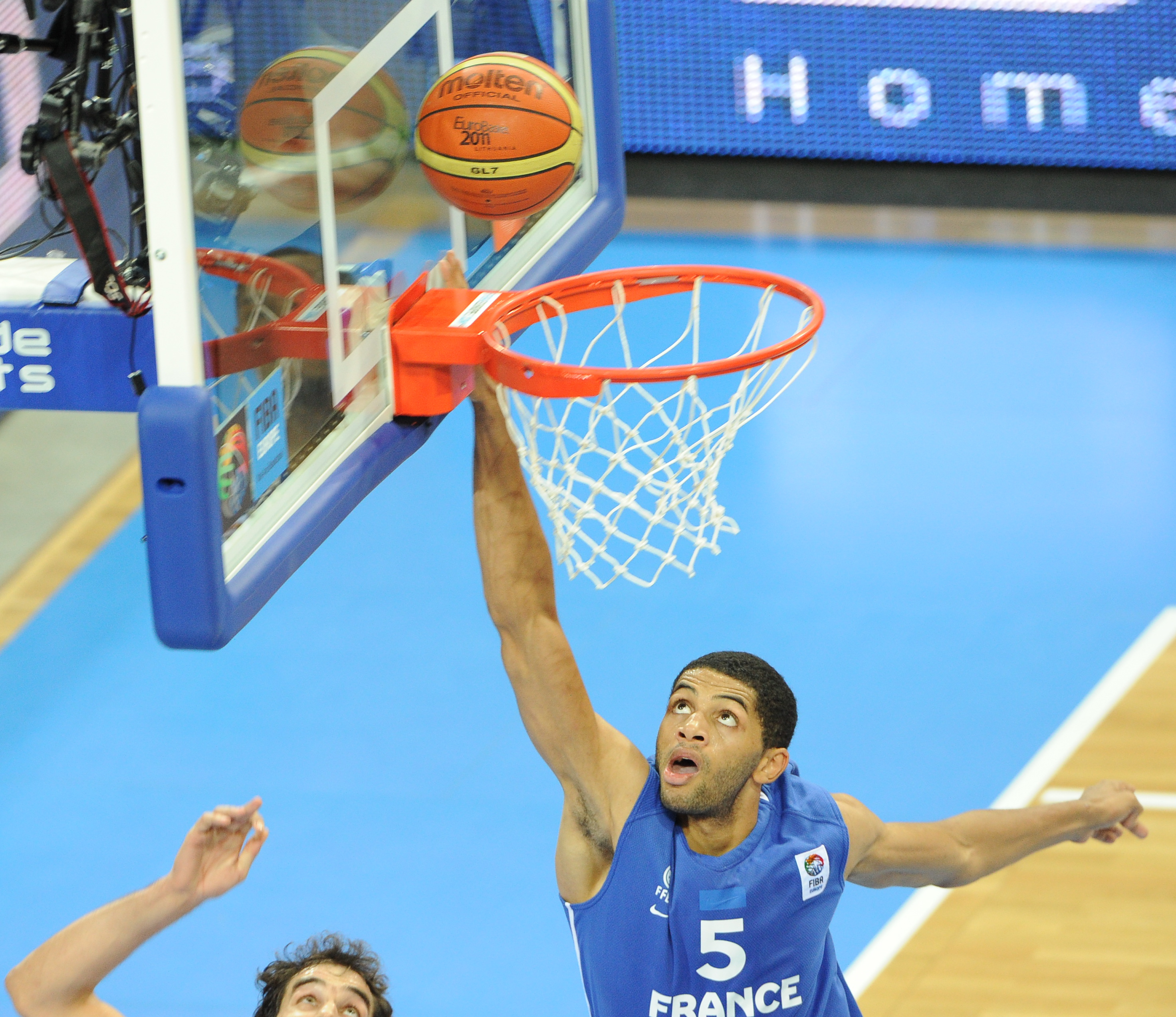
Nicolas Batum gave Team France much support to win silver at the EuroBasket 2011.

After a disappointing showing from France during the 2010 FIBA World Cup, where they were knocked out in the Round of 16, the team looked toward EuroBasket 2011 with high expectations after an impressive run in 2009. France was placed into Group B, with Latvia as their first opponent. France got off to a slow start to begin the game as they trailed after the first quarter 18–25. Although the team would step it up in the second quarter, to only trail 40–41 at halftime. In the second half, France demonstrated why they were one of the favourites heading into the tournament. As they finished off the game strong and pulled out the win 89–78, behind Tony Parker's game high (31 points and 7 assists). In their second match against Israel, France never faced any pressure, as they led throughout to an 68–85 victory. Standing with a record of (2–0), next up for France was a date with Dirk Nowitzki and Germany. Similar to their first match, France got off to another slow start where the team trailed after the first period. But they rallied back in the second quarter to take a 29–28 halftime lead. France exploded in the third quarter, which gave the national team an 18-point cushion heading into the fourth quarter. This deficit would prove too much to overcome for Germany, as France led by Tony Parker's 32 points on 55% shooting, and six assists moved to (3–0).

Still undefeated, France had another tough test awaiting, with Italy in their way. For three quarters France struggled against the stymie defense of the Italians, where they were down 67–60 heading into the fourth quarter. With Tony Parker having an off shooting night, other team leaders such as Boris Diaw (21 points), and Nicolas Batum (20 points) gave the team the lift it needed down the stretch to prevail 84–91. The win also helped France clinch a spot in the second group phase. France having already locked up a spot to advance went up against the undefeated Serbia in their final match of Group B. In a highly competitive match between these two unbeaten teams, where overtime was needed to determine the winner, France with balanced scoring from six players in double figures handed Serbia their first lost 96–97.

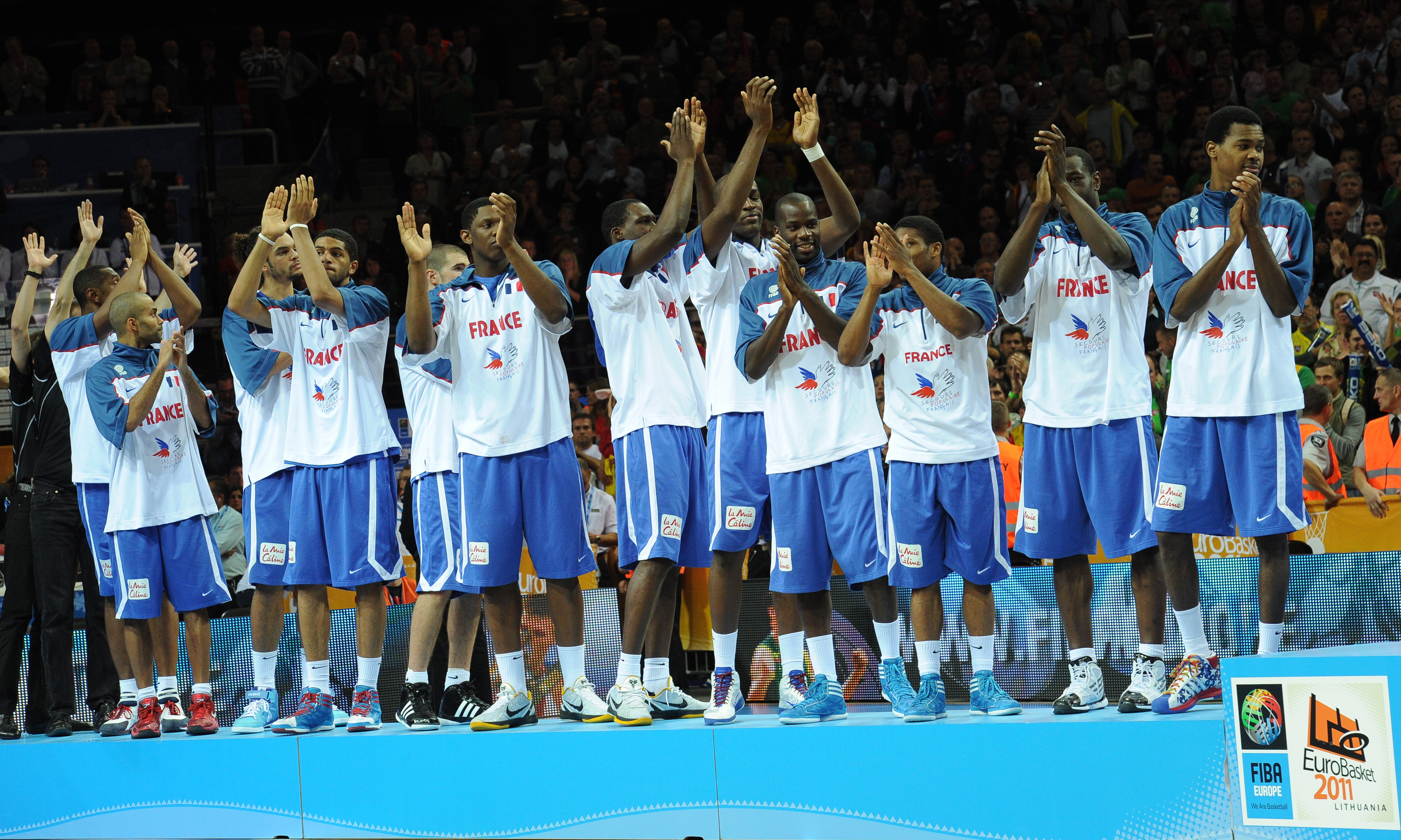
France national team after winning silver medals at the EuroBasket 2011

In the second group phase France won their first two matches against Turkey, and Lithuania, before falling to Spain. The result was enough to book a place into the quarter-finals. There, France battled Greece with a chance to reach the semis on the line. The team eventually escaped with a 64–56 victory. France needing one more win to put themselves in position to play for the title, first had to get past Andrei Kirilenko and Russia. The two teams played a really close game throughout, but France did just enough to place themselves in prime position to move on.

France reached the final of the EuroBasket for the first time since 1949, where they were up against Spain. Unfortunately, the team came up short, as Spain repeated as European champions. However, led by the extraordinary performances from the iconic Tony Parker, France proved they would be a threat on the international scene in the future.

The 2012 Summer Olympics came and went without much noise made from the French, as the team bowed out in the quarter-finals. Heading toward the EuroBasket 2013, France was eager to flip the script and display the execution needed to make a deep tournament run. However, in their first match at the Euro finals in Group A, France was defeated by Germany 74–80. The loss quickly refocused the team for their next two matches, against Great Britain, and Israel, as they blew out both opponents fairly easily. France went on to also win their next two games in the preliminary phase against Ukraine and Belgium, to finish top of Group A to advance.

During the second group phase France suffered their second loss of the tournament, falling to Lithuania. Although the team turned around in their next match to beat Latvia 102–91, behind big games from center Alexis Ajinça (25 points and 3 blocks) and Tony Parker's (23 points). With a place in the quarter-finals assured, France managed to drop their third match, this time a 77–65 defeat to Serbia.

In their quarter-finals match France were up against the EuroBasket 2013 host Slovenia. However, the team dispelled any notion there would be carryover from their prior game, as they prevailed 62–72. The win also set up a EuroBasket 2011 final rematch between Spain. Heading into the semi-finals, France was resolute to make amends for their 2009 and 2011 eliminations. But it was the Spaniards who began this duel with more urgency, as they outplayed the French in the first half to lead 34–20. To begin the third quarter France slowly started cutting into Spain's lead with their defensive tenacity to trail 49–43 going into the fourth quarter. Entering the final period France continued their harassing defensive pressure, which started to wear the Spaniards down. France eventually fought all the way back, to pull even with their nemesis 65–65 to send the game into overtime. In extra time, France did not let this golden opportunity slip away, as they finally pulled ahead to win 72–75. Led once again by Tony Parker and his (32 points), along with the clutch performance from Antoine Diot, France were heading back to the title game.

Following their win against Spain, France entered the final against Lithuania. France won the game and became European champions for the first time. Tony Parker's play throughout the tournament earned him MVP honors.

Due to their rousing accomplishment at EuroBasket 2013, France qualified for the 2014 FIBA World Cup. Although without the services of Tony Parker, other players stepped up to try and fill the void. France was drawn into Group A at the finals, which many viewed as the Group of Death. Their first opponent was Brazil, which resulted in a tightly contested match the French would lose 63–65. Next up for France, was a date with Serbia. France looking to pick up their first win during the finals, battled back and forth with the Serbians until they escaped with a narrow 73–74 victory. Now at a record of (1–1), France easily put away Egypt in their third match of the group stage before they faced the tournament hosts Spain. There, the team was thoroughly outplayed by the Spanish, who handed France a heavy defeat 88–64. Although the French would rebound to close out the preliminary phase with a win against Iran 81–76.

Entering the Round of 16, waiting for France was Croatia. The French would get off to a lethargic start, as they trailed the Croatians 7–15 after the first quarter. France would ultimately reverse their fortune in the second, turning up their defense to hold Croatia to just seven points to head into halftime with a one-point lead. Entering the third quarter, France continued to frustrate Croatia on defense, to extend their advantage heading to the fourth. However, Croatia would put up a solid final period to no avail, France would hold on 69–64 to advance. In the quarter-finals, France would once again be paired against a familiar foe, Spain. Although this time around France displayed more resolve against the Spaniards, as they eliminated one of the World Cup favourites comfortably 65–52.

France arrived at the semi-finals confident before their rematch with Serbia. But even after a remarkable 35-point performance from Nicolas Batum, France lost to the eventual tournament runners-up 85–90. After the devastating lost in the semis, France turned around and finished up strong to win a highly competitive bronze medal match against Lithuania 93–95.

France was named as one of four co-hosts for EuroBasket 2015. At the Euro finals, France was aided by the return of EuroBasket 2013 MVP Tony Parker to the national team. With their floor general back in the fold, the French were tabbed as one of the early favourites to win the tournament and repeat. Being placed into Group A to begin their title defense, France was tasked with Finland as their first opponent. In front of an exuberant home crowd, France got off to a quick start to possess the lead after the first quarter. The French would continue to feed off this momentum as they extended their advantage heading into halftime up 45–37. Although in the third and fourth quarters Finland mounted a vigorous comeback, to send the match into overtime. However, France would not be denied on their home soil, as they pulled out an emotional 97–87 victory. After the win, France would go on to triumph through their remaining four matches in group play to clinch a place into the Round of 16.

Awaiting France in their next match was Turkey, a game they would cruise to victory 76–53. Their opponent in the quarter-finals was Latvia, who were looking to upset the hosts and advance to the semis. They were ultimately denied that chance 84–70, as France in front of over 22,000 spectators at Stade Pierre-Mauroy moved closer to their desired destination. France, needing one more win to put themselves in position to play in the final, were again pitted against rivals Spain. In a classic duel between the two battle-tested sides, it was the Spaniards led by Pau Gasol's 40 points and 11 rebounds ending France's hope of repeating. However, with third place still on the line France defeated Serbia 81–68 to come away with the bronze medal.

After going (4–0) during the 2016 Olympic Qualifying Tournament, France qualified for the 2016 Summer Olympics. Although they only managed to reach the quarter-finals before ceding once again to Spain. After the tournament, French great Tony Parker announced his retirement from the national team, ending an illustrious run with Les Bleurs.

At EuroBasket 2017, France continued their underwhelming play, as the team was knocked out in the Round of 16 to Germany 84–81. The devastating loss for France was their worst finish at the Euros since 1963.

During the process to qualify for the 2019 FIBA World Cup, France went through European Qualifiers in order to secure a spot. The national team would go on to finish with a (10–2) record during qualifying to clinch their place at the World Cup finals.

At the 2019 FIBA World Cup, France entered the tournament looking to continue their strong play the team displayed during the qualifiers. France was slotted into Group G to begin their run at the World Cup finals. Their first test was against a familiar foe in Germany, a match that went down to the wire. But behind the heroics of national team star Evan Fournier's (26 points and 10 rebounds) France pulled out a tight 78–74 win. In their final two preliminary group phase matches versus Jordan and Dominican Republic, France advanced to the second group phase, by trashing their opponents on route to heavy victories.

In France's next encounter, the team were up against Lithuania. France, however, prevailed in a physical clash between the two European heavyweights 78–75, to lockup a spot into the quarter-finals with one match remaining in the second group phase. There, France were pitted against Australia. Although even with another strong showing from Evan Fournier, and his (31 points and 6 rebounds) the team fell 98–100.

In the quarter-finals, France had the duty of trying to knock off the favourites of the tournament, the United States. Ultimately led by majestic games from Evan Fournier and big man Rudy Gobert, France eliminated the United States 79–89. The win advanced the team into the semi-finals with a date versus Argentina. With the emotional confidence boosting win behind them, France exhibited lackluster urgency in their next match in an 80–66 defeat to the Argentines. The lost for France was their second consecutive ouster in the semis at the World Cup. France would move on to claim the bronze medal, downing Australia in a rematch 67–59.

Heading toward the 2020 Summer Olympics, France automatically qualified for the event, through being one of top two European finishers at the prior World Cup. In the opening match of the tournament for France, behind Evan Fournier's team high (28 points), France once again defeated the United States 83–76. After the solid victory, France would make it all the way to the semi-finals to meet the surprise team of the competition to that point, in Luka Dončić and Slovenia. With a place into the gold medal game on the line, Nicolas Batum's game saving block at the buzzer lifted France into the final 90–89. Although in a rematch with the United States, France would have to settle for silver, as the team would lose 82–87.

During EuroBasket 2022 qualifying, France made it through with a (4–2) record, to clinch qualification to their 39th appearance to the Euro finals. After losing in their first match of Group B to Germany, France moved to (1–1), following a strong victory against rivals Lithuania 73–77. France would go on to win two of their last three group stage matches, to advance into the knockout phase. In the Round of 16, France survived an upset scare in overtime, from a feisty Turkish side 86–87. Entering the quarter-finals, France once again needed overtime to keep their title hopes alive, this time in a win against Italy 93–85. After cruising past Poland in the semi-finals, France were back in the final of the EuroBasket for first time since 2013. However, the team saw its tournament journey end, falling to Spain 88–76.

Entering European Qualifiers for the 2023 FIBA World Cup, France cruised to qualification after accumulating a (10–2) record to secure their ninth appearance at the World Cup finals. However, the national team was quickly eliminated from the event, following disastrous performances in two out of their three group stage games; which sent France into the classification round to finish the tournament.

After France's shock group stage exit at the World Cup, they immediately turned their focus to the 2024 Summer Olympics, in which they were hosts. Leading up to the event, the French Federation of Basketball held a ceremony during a friendly match against Serbia to honour and retire the number 9 jersey of French legend Tony Parker. Entering the competition, in their first game, the national team secured a tough win against Brazil 78–66. Heading into their second match of the tournament, with Japan ten seconds away from upsetting France, the heroics of guard Matthew Strazel and his four-point play at the end of regulation saved Les Bleus from disaster; where they would eventually survive in overtime 90–94. Following the victory, France dropped their final group play match against Germany 71–85.

In the quarter-finals, France eliminated the previously undefeated Canada 82–73, to setup a rematch with Germany in the semi-finals. There, France would get revenge in a dramatic win against Germany 73–69, to reach a second consecutive Olympic final. However, France would fall short once again to the United States 87–98. At the conclusion of the event, France's longest tenured national team head coach Vincent Collet stepped down from his position.

In September 2024, France named Frédéric Fauthoux as new head coach of the national team. He guided France for the last four games during EuroBasket 2025 qualifying, where they finished the qualification period at a (6–0) record to reach the finals. Placed into Group D to begin the tournament, France compiled a record of (4–1) during the group phase to advance into the knockout stage. Although in the Round of 16, France suffered a stunning defeat to Georgia 70–80, to be eliminated.

== Competitive record ==
=== FIBA World Cup ===
World Cup					Qualification		
Year	Position	Pld	W	L	Pld	W	L
(Argentina) 1950	6th	8	2	6	Direct qualification		
(Brazil) 1954	4th	9	4	5	EuroBasket served as qualifiers		
(Chile) 1959	Did not qualify				EuroBasket served as qualifiers		
(Brazil) 1963	5th	9	4	5	EuroBasket served as qualifiers		
(Uruguay) 1967	Did not qualify				EuroBasket served as qualifiers		
(Socialist Federal Republic of Yugoslavia) 1970	Did not qualify				EuroBasket served as qualifiers		
(Puerto Rico) 1974	Did not qualify				EuroBasket served as qualifiers		
(Philippines) 1978	Did not qualify				EuroBasket served as qualifiers		
(Colombia) 1982	Did not qualify				EuroBasket served as qualifiers		
(Spain) 1986	13th	5	3	2	6	3	3
(Argentina) 1990	Did not qualify				EuroBasket served as qualifiers		
(Canada) 1994	Did not qualify				EuroBasket served as qualifiers		
(Greece) 1998	Did not qualify				EuroBasket served as qualifiers		
(United States) 2002	Did not qualify				EuroBasket served as qualifiers		
(Japan) 2006	5th	9	6	3	EuroBasket served as qualifiers		
(Turkey) 2010	13th	6	3	3	EuroBasket served as qualifiers		
(Spain) 2014	3rd place, bronze medalist(s)	9	6	3	EuroBasket served as qualifiers		
(China) 2019	3rd place, bronze medalist(s)	8	6	2	12	10	2
(Philippines) (Japan) (Indonesia) 2023	18th	5	3	2	12	10	2
(Qatar) 2027	To be determined				To be determined		
(France) 2031	Qualified as host				Qualified		
Total	9/19	68	37	31	30	23	7

=== Olympic Games ===
Olympic Games					Qualifying		
Year	Position	Pld	W	L	Pld	W	L
(Nazi Germany) 1936	19th	2	0	2			
(United Kingdom) 1948	2nd place, silver medalist(s)	7	5	2			
(Finland) 1952	8th	8	4	4			
(Australia) 1956	4th	8	5	3			
(Italy) 1960	10th	8	5	3	Direct qualification		
(Japan) 1964	Did not qualify				8	6	2
(Mexico) 1968	Did not qualify				8	7	1
(West Germany) 1972	Did not qualify				9	5	4
(Canada) 1976	Did not qualify				5	2	3
(Soviet Union) 1980	Did not qualify				10	6	4
(United States) 1984	11th	7	1	6	9	6	3
(South Korea) 1988	Did not qualify				9	2	7
(Spain) 1992	Did not qualify				6	5	1
(United States) 1996	Did not qualify				Did not qualify		
(Australia) 2000	2nd place, silver medalist(s)	8	4	4	Direct qualification		
(Greece) 2004	Did not qualify				Did not qualify		
(China) 2008	Did not qualify				Did not qualify		
(United Kingdom) 2012	6th	6	4	2	Direct qualification		
(Brazil) 2016	6th	6	3	3	4	4	0
(Japan) 2020	2nd place, silver medalist(s)	6	5	1	Direct qualification		
(France) 2024	2nd place, silver medalist(s)	6	4	2	Qualified as host		
(United States) 2028	To be determined				To be determined		
(Australia) 2032	To be determined				To be determined		
Total	11/21	72	40	32	68	43	25

=== EuroBasket ===
EuroBasket					Qualification		
Year	Position	Pld	W	L	Pld	W	L
(Switzerland) 1935	5th	4	3	1			
(Latvia) 1937	3rd place, bronze medalist(s)	5	3	2			
(Lithuania) 1939	4th	7	4	3			
(Switzerland) 1946	4th	4	2	2			
(Czechoslovakia) 1947	5th	6	4	2			
(Egypt) 1949	2nd place, silver medalist(s)	6	5	1			
(France) 1951	3rd place, bronze medalist(s)	9	6	3			
(Soviet Union) 1953	3rd place, bronze medalist(s)	10	6	4			
(Hungary) 1955	9th	10	8	2			
(Bulgaria) 1957	8th	10	2	8			
(Turkey) 1959	3rd place, bronze medalist(s)	9	6	3			
(Socialist Federal Republic of Yugoslavia) 1961	4th	8	5	3			
(Poland) 1963	13th	9	3	6	Direct qualification		
(Soviet Union) 1965	9th	9	4	5	3	3	0
(Finland) 1967	11th	9	4	5	2	2	0
(Italy) 1969	Did not qualify				4	1	3
(West Germany) 1971	10th	7	1	6	4	4	0
(Spain) 1973	10th	7	1	6	9	8	1
(Socialist Federal Republic of Yugoslavia) 1975	Did not qualify				8	3	5
(Belgium) 1977	11th	7	2	5	8	6	2
(Italy) 1979	8th	8	5	3	8	8	0
(Czechoslovakia) 1981	8th	8	4	4	Direct qualification		
(France) 1983	5th	7	4	3	Qualified as host		
(West Germany) 1985	6th	8	2	6	Direct qualification		
(Greece) 1987	9th	7	3	4	Direct qualification		
(Socialist Federal Republic of Yugoslavia) 1989	6th	5	2	3	9	7	2
(Italy) 1991	4th	5	1	4	6	4	2
(Germany) 1993	7th	9	6	3	Direct qualification		
(Greece) 1995	8th	9	4	5	6	5	1
(Spain) 1997	10th	8	2	6	10	10	0
(France) 1999	4th	9	6	3	Qualified as host		
(Turkey) 2001	6th	6	3	3	Direct qualification		
(Sweden) 2003	4th	6	4	2	10	8	2
(Serbia and Montenegro) 2005	3rd place, bronze medalist(s)	7	4	3	Direct qualification		
(Spain) 2007	8th	9	4	5	Direct qualification		
(Poland) 2009	5th	9	8	1	12	7	5
(Lithuania) 2011	2nd place, silver medalist(s)	11	9	2	Direct qualification		
(Slovenia) 2013	1st place, gold medalist(s)	11	8	3	Direct qualification		
(France) (Croatia) (Germany) (Latvia) 2015	3rd place, bronze medalist(s)	9	8	1	Qualified as co-host		
(Finland) (Israel) (Romania) (Turkey) 2017	12th	6	3	3	Direct qualification		
(Czech Republic) (Georgia (country)) (Italy) (Germany) 2022	2nd place, silver medalist(s)	9	6	3	6	4	2
(Cyprus) (Finland) (Poland) (Latvia) 2025	9th	6	4	2	6	6	0
(Estonia) (Greece) (Slovenia) (Spain) 2029	To be determined				To be determined		
Total	40/42	308	169	139	111	86	25

== Results and fixtures ==
Win Loss

=== 2025 ===
28 November 2025 2027 FIBA World Cup qualifiers – 1st round	France	79–63	Belgium	Rouen, France
20:30 CET (UTC+1)	Scoring by quarter: 16–17, 13–14, 20–14, 30–18
	Pts: Sene 15; Rebs: Gaudoux 8 Asts: Albicy 6	Boxscore	Pts: Obasohan 14; Rebs: Bolavie, Van Vliet 5 Asts: four players 2	Arena: Kindarena; Attendance: 4,206; Referees: Antonio Conde (ESP), Paulo Marques (POR), Valerio Grigioni (ITA)

1 December 2025 2027 FIBA World Cup qualifiers – 1st round	Finland	83–76	France	Espoo, Finland
18:30 EET (UTC+2)	Scoring by quarter: 20–19, 17–26, 19–16, 27–15
	Pts: Maxhuni 22; Rebs: Jantunen 9 Asts: Jantunen 6	Boxscore	Pts: Strazel 11; Rebs: Gaudoux 7 Asts: Sene, Strazel 3	Arena: Espoo Metro Areena; Attendance: 6,683; Referees: Ademir Zurapović (BIH), Fernando Calatrava (ESP), Juozas Barkauskas (LTU)

=== 2026 ===
27 February 2026 2027 FIBA World Cup qualifiers – 1st round	Hungary	71–74	France	Szombathely, Hungary
18:00 CET (UTC+1)	Scoring by quarter: 15–16, 16–22, 16–17, 24–19
	Pts: Perl 21; Rebs: Golomán 6 Asts: Somogyi 7	Boxscore	Pts: Noua 15; Rebs: Cornelie, Noua 6 Asts: Francisco 5	Arena: Arena Savaria; Attendance: 2,900; Referees: Gvidas Gedvilas (LTU), Zafer Yılmaz (TUR), Ofer Manheim (ISR)

1 March 2026 2027 FIBA World Cup qualifiers – 1st round	France	98–79	Hungary	Le Mans, France
18:00 CET (UTC+1)	Scoring by quarter: 25–16, 30–19, 19–24, 24–20
	Pts: Noua 21; Rebs: Hoard 6 Asts: Okobo 5	Boxscore	Pts: Perl 18; Rebs: four players 4 Asts: Perl 5	Arena: Antarès; Attendance: 5,812; Referees: Petar Pešić (SRB), Ivor Matějek (CZE), Ioannis Agrafiotis (GRE)

3 July 2026 2027 FIBA World Cup qualifiers – 1st round	Belgium	72–80	France	Antwerp, Belgium
20:30 CEST (UTC+2)	Scoring by quarter: 13–22, 17–21, 25–16, 17–21
	Pts: Lecomte 17; Rebs: Van Vliet 6 Asts: Van Den Eynde 7	Boxscore	Pts: Coulibaly 13; Rebs: Gobert 11; Asts: Hifi 6	Arena: Lotto Arena; Attendance: 4,436; Referees: Michał Proc (POL), Andrea Bongiorni (ITA), Łukasz Jankowski (POL)

6 July 2026 2027 FIBA World Cup qualifiers – 1st round	France	98–69	Finland	Pau, France
20:30 CEST (UTC+2)	Scoring by quarter: 31–16, 18–14, 28–17, 21–22
	Pts: Okobo, Raynaud 16; Rebs: Hoard 8 Asts: Strazel 7	Boxscore	Pts: Jantunen, Markkanen 14; Rebs: Jantunen 5 Asts: Maxhuni 5	Arena: Palais des Sports de Pau; Attendance: 7,131; Referees: Luis Castillo (ESP), Martin Vulić (CRO), Ilias Kounellis (CYP)

20 August 2026 Friendly	Serbia	90–87	France	Belgrade, Serbia
20:00 CEST (UTC+2)	Scoring by quarter: 22–19, 24–26, 26–17, 18–25
	Pts: Jokić 20; Rebs: Jokić 9 Asts: Jokić 8	Boxscore; Video	Pts: Noua 14; Rebs: three players 5 Asts: Francisco, Gobert 3	Arena: Belgrade Arena; Attendance: 17,026

23 August 2026 Friendly	France	91–90	Serbia	Orléans, France
18:00 CEST (UTC+2)	Scoring by quarter: 27–22, 27–13, 14–27, 23–28
	Pts: Francisco 20; Rebs: Noua 9 Asts: Francisco, Strazel 4	Boxscore; Video	Pts: Jokić 34; Rebs: Jokić 13; Asts: Jokić 5	Arena: CO'Met Arena; Attendance: 10,200

27 August 2026 2027 FIBA World Cup qualifiers – 2nd round	France	92–67	Slovenia	Paris, France
20:30 CEST (UTC+2)	Scoring by quarter: 31–17, 23–18, 19–15, 19–17
	Pts: Wembanyama 22; Rebs: Wembanyama 9 Asts: Strazel 6	Boxscore	Pts: Glas, Krampelj 10; Rebs: Omić 11; Asts: Samar 5	Arena: Accor Arena; Attendance: 15,831; Referees: Antonio Conde (ESP), Paulo Marques (POR), Andris Aunkrogers (LAT)

30 August 2026 2027 FIBA World Cup qualifiers – 2nd round	Sweden	69–84	France	Stockholm, Sweden
17:30 CEST (UTC+2)	Scoring by quarter: 24–20, 14–18, 16–17, 15–29
	Pts: Larsson 23; Rebs: Gaddefors 10; Asts: Birgander 7	Boxscore	Pts: Wembanyama 18; Rebs: Wembanyama 8 Asts: Strazel 6	Arena: Avicii Arena; Attendance: 14,750; Referees: Martin Horozov (BUL), Georgios Poursanidis (GRE), Siniša Prpa (SRB)

27 November 2026 2027 FIBA World Cup qualifiers – 2nd round	Estonia	vs.	France	Tallinn, Estonia
19:00 EET (UTC+2)
		Boxscore		Arena: Unibet Arena

30 November 2026 2027 FIBA World Cup qualifiers – 2nd round	France	vs.	Sweden	Dijon, France
20:30 CET (UTC+1)
		Boxscore		Arena: Palais des sports Jean-Michel-Geoffroy

=== 2027 ===
25 February 2027 2027 FIBA World Cup qualifiers – 2nd round	Slovenia	vs.	France	Slovenia
--:-- CET (UTC+1)
		Boxscore

28 February 2027 2027 FIBA World Cup qualifiers – 2nd round	France	vs.	Estonia	France
--:-- CET (UTC+1)
		Boxscore

== Team ==
=== Current roster ===
Roster for the 2027 FIBA World Cup Qualifiers matches on 27 and 30 November 2026 against Estonia and Sweden.

France men's national basketball team roster
Players
Coaches

Pos.	No.	Name	Age – Date of birth	Height	Club	Ctr.
G		Gérald Ayayi	25 – 24 August 2001	1.91 m (6 ft 3 in)	Roma	(Italy)
PG		Hugo Benitez	25 – 20 January 2001	1.92 m (6 ft 4 in)	Manresa	(Spain)
SF		Axel Bouteille	31 – 14 April 1995	2.01 m (6 ft 7 in)	Budućnost	(Montenegro)
PF		Mohamed Diarra	26 – 1 January 2000	2.08 m (6 ft 10 in)	Cholet	(France)
F/C		Lionel Gaudoux	31 – 30 May 1995	1.98 m (6 ft 6 in)	Bourg	(France)
PG		Nadir Hifi	24 – 16 July 2002	1.80 m (5 ft 11 in)	Paris	(France)
F		Jaylen Hoard	27 – 30 March 1999	2.04 m (6 ft 8 in)	Maccabi Tel Aviv	(Israel)
PG		Mathéo Leray	23 – 25 March 2003	1.90 m (6 ft 3 in)	Élan Chalon	(France)
C		Mathias Lessort	31 – 29 September 1995	2.06 m (6 ft 9 in)	Panathinaikos	(Greece)
SG		Adam Mokoka	28 – 18 July 1998	1.95 m (6 ft 5 in)	Aris	(Greece)
PF		Amine Noua	29 – 7 February 1997	2.02 m (6 ft 8 in)	Unicaja	(Spain)
C		Zacharie Perrin	22 – 30 August 2004	2.08 m (6 ft 10 in)	Força Lleida	(Spain)
PG		Benjamin Sene	32 – 13 May 1994	1.88 m (6 ft 2 in)	Nanterre	(France)
SF		Hugo Yimga-Moukouri	18 – 3 July 2008	2.06 m (6 ft 9 in)	Nanterre	(France)

Head coach

- (France) Frédéric Fauthoux

Assistant coach(es)

- (France) Laurent Vila
- (France) Pascal Donnadieu
- (France) Bryan George
- (France) Joseph Gomis

Legend

- (C) Team captain
- Club – describes last
  club before the competition
- Age – describes age
  on 23 October 2026

=== Depth chart ===
Pos.	Starting 5	Bench 1	Bench 2	Bench 3	Inactive
C	Victor Wembanyama	Rudy Gobert	Mathias Lessort	Vincent Poirier	Maxime Raynaud
PF	Alex Sarr	Guerschon Yabusele	Jaylen Hoard	Tidjane Salaun	Noa Essengue
SF	Zaccharie Risacher	Evan Fournier	Timothé Luwawu-Cabarrot	Isaïa Cordinier	Amine Noua
SG	Bilal Coulibaly	Nadir Hifi	Élie Okobo	Nolan Traore	Sidy Cissoko
PG	Sylvain Francisco	Théo Maledon	Matthew Strazel	Frank Ntilikina	Killian Hayes

== Head coach history ==
- (France) Teddy Kriegk – (1935–1936)
- (France) Henri Kretzschmar – (1937–1938)
- (France) Paul Geist – (1939, 1946)
- (Lithuania) / (United States) Michael Rutzgis – (1947)
- (France) Robert Busnel – (1947–1957)
- (France) André Buffière – (1957–1964)
- (France) Joë Jaunay – (1965–1974)
- (France) Jacques Fiévé – (1974)
- (France) Pierre Dao – (1975–1983)
- (France) Jean Luent – (1983–1985)
- (France) Jean Galle – (1985–1988)
- (France) Francis Jordane – (1988–1993)
- (France) Michel Gomez – (1993–1995)
- (France) Jean-Pierre de Vincenzi – (1995–2000)
- (France) Alain Weisz – (2000–2003)
- (France) Claude Bergeaud – (2003–2007)
- (France) Michel Gomez – (2008–2009)
- (France) Vincent Collet – (2009–2024)
- (France) Frédéric Fauthoux – (2024–present)

== Past rosters ==
1935 EuroBasket: finished 5th among 10 teams

3 Pierre Boël, 4 Robert Cohu, 5 Jacques Flouret, 6 Raoul Gouga, 7 Henri Hell, 8 Charles Hemmerlin, 9 Étienne Rolland, 10 Francis Rudler (Coach: Teddy Kriegk)

1936 Olympic Games: finished 19th among 21 teams

1 Pierre Boël, 2 Pierre Caque, 3 Georges Carrier, 4 Robert Cohu, 5 Jean Couturier, 6 Jacques Flouret, 7 Edmond Leclerc, 8 Étienne Onimus, 9 Fernand Prudhomme, 10 Étienne Rolland, 11 Lucien Thèze (Coach: Teddy Kriegk)

1937 EuroBasket: finished (bronze) among 8 teams

3 Pierre Boël, 4 Robert Cohu, 5 Jacques Flouret, 6 Henri Hell, 7 Edmond Leclerc, 8 Henri Lesmayoux, 9 Fernand Prudhomme, 10 Étienne Rolland, 11 Eugene Ronner, 12 Marcel Verot (Coach: Henri Kretzschmar)

1939 EuroBasket: finished 4th among 8 teams

3 Vladimir Fabrikant, 4 Henri Lesmayoux, 5 Fernand Prudhomme, 6 Jean Jeammes, 7 Étienne Rolland, 8 Émile Frézot, 9 Alexandre Katlama, 10 Robert Cohu, 11 Maurice Mertz, 12 Abel Gravier, 13 Robert Busnel, 14 André Ambroise, 15 Gabriel Gonnet, 16 Gaston Falleur (Coach: Paul Geist)

1946 EuroBasket: finished 4th among 10 teams

3 André Buffière, 4 Jean Duperray, 5 Robert Busnel, 6 Jacques Perrier, 7 Andre Tartary, 8 Justy Specker, 9 Lucien Rebuffic, 10 Paul Chaumont, 11 Henri Lesmayoux, 12 Émile Frézot, 13 Étienne Rolland, 14 René Chocat, 15 André Goeuriot, 16 Maurice Girardot (Coach: Paul Geist)

1947 EuroBasket: finished 5th among 14 teams

3 André Goeuriot, 4 Jean Duperray, 5 Robert Busnel, 6 Émile Frézot, 7 Pierre Thiolon, 8 Jacques Perrier, 9 René Chocat, 10 Fernand Guillou, 11 Jacques Favory, 12 Marcel Béziers, 13 Aimé Gravas, 14 Maurice Girardot, 15 Henri Lesmayoux, 16 Jacques Faucherre (Coach: Michael Rutzgis)

1948 Olympic Games: finished (silver) among 23 teams

3 André Buffière, 4 René Dérency, 5 Pierre Thiolon, 6 Jacques Perrier, 7 René Chocat, 8 Raymond Offner, 9 André Even, 10 Maurice Desaymonnet, 11 Fernand Guillou, 12 Michel Bonnevie, 13 Maurice Girardot, 14 Lucien Rebuffic, 15 Yvan Quénin, 16 André Barrais (Coach: Robert Busnel)

1949 EuroBasket: finished (silver) among 7 teams

3 André Buffière, 4 Jean Perniceni, 5 Jacques Freimuller, 6 Jean Swidzinski, 7 René Chocat, 8 Jean-Pierre Salignon, 9 Marc Quiblier, 10 Robert Busnel, 11 Jacques Dessemme, 12 André Vacheresse, 13 Louis Devoti, 14 Maurice Desaymonnet, 15 Jacques Favory, 16 Fernand Guillou (Coach: Robert Busnel)

1950 FIBA World Cup: finished 6th among 10 teams

3 Jacques Perrier, 4 Jean Swidzinski, 5 Jean Perniceni, 6 Fernand Guillou, 7 Robert Marsolat, 8 Jean-Pierre Salignon, 9 Maurice Marcelot, 10 Maurice Desaymonnet, 11 Jacques Dessemme, 12 André Vacheresse, 13 Jacques Chalifour, 15 Robert Monclar (Coach: Robert Busnel)

1951 EuroBasket: finished (bronze) among 17 teams

3 André Vacheresse, 4 Pierre Thiolon, 5 Marc Quiblier, 6 Louis Devoti, 7 Jacques Freimuller, 8 Jean-Pierre Salignon, 9 Justy Specker, 10 René Chocat, 11 Jacques Dessemme, 12 André Buffière, 13 Robert Guillin, 14 Marc Peirone, 15 Robert Monclar, 16 Jean Perniceni (Coach: Robert Busnel)

1952 Olympic Games: finished 8th among 23 teams

3 Roger Haudegand, 4 Bernard Planque, 5 Robert Monclar, 6 René Chocat, 7 Jean Perniceni, 8 Louis Devoti, 9 Robert Guillin, 10 Robert Crost, 11 Jacques Dessemme, 12 André Buffière, 13 André Vacheresse, 14 André Chavet, 15 Jean-Pierre Salignon, 16 Jean-Paul Beugnot (Coach: Robert Busnel)

1953 EuroBasket: finished (bronze) among 17 teams

3 Jacques Freimuller, 4 Bernard Planque, 5 Robert Monclar, 6 Claude Gallay, 7 Jean Perniceni, 8 Roger Haudegand, 9 Robert Guillin, 10 René Chocat, 11 Jacques Dessemme, 12 André Buffière, 13 André Vacheresse, 14 Henri Rey, 15 Marc Quiblier, 16 Justy Specker (Coach: Robert Busnel)

1954 FIBA World Cup: finished 4th among 12 teams

3 Roger Haudegand, 4 Robert Zagury, 5 Robert Monclar, 6 Jacques Freimuller, 7 Jean Perniceni, 8 Henri Rey, 9 Roger Antoine, 10 Henri Grange, 11 Jacques Dessemme, 12 André Buffière, 13 Louis Bertorelle, 14 Jean-Paul Beugnot, 15 André Schlupp, 16 Yves Gominon (Coach: Robert Busnel)

1955 EuroBasket: finished 9th among 18 teams

3 Gérard Pontais, 4 Bernard Planque, 5 Robert Monclar, 6 Jacques Freimuller, 7 Jean Perniceni, 8 Henri Rey, 9 Jacques Owen, 10 Henri Grange, 11 Maurice Marcelot, 12 André Buffière, 13 André Vacheresse, 14 Jean-Paul Beugnot, 15 Louis Bertorelle, 16 Robert Giraud (Coach: Robert Busnel)

1956 Olympic Games: finished 4th among 15 teams

3 Roger Haudegand, 4 Christian Baltzer, 5 Robert Monclar, 6 Roger Veyron, 7 Gérard Sturla, 8 Henri Rey, 9 Roger Antoine, 10 Henri Grange, 11 Yves Gominon, 12 Maurice Buffière, 13 André Schlupp, 14 Jean-Paul Beugnot (Coach: Robert Busnel)

1957 EuroBasket: finished 8th among 16 teams

3 Louis Bertorelle, 4 Christian Baltzer, 5 Robert Monclar, 6 Maurice Buffière, 7 Gérard Sturla, 8 Roger Guillaume, 9 Roger Antoine, 10 Henri Grange, 11 Bernard Mayeur, 12 Roger Veyron, 13 Claude Desseaux, 14 Jean-Claude Lefebvre (Coach: André Buffière)

1959 EuroBasket: finished (bronze) among 17 teams

3 Max Dorigo, 4 André Chavet, 5 Robert Monclar, 6 Christian Baltzer, 7 Lucien Sedat, 8 Henri Villecourt, 9 Jérôme Christ, 10 Henri Grange, 11 Bernard Mayeur, 12 Michel Rat, 13 Philippe Baillet, 14 Jean-Claude Lefebvre (Coach: André Buffière)

1960 Olympic Games: finished 10th among 16 teams

3 Henri Villecourt, 4 Max Dorigo, 5 Robert Monclar, 6 Jérôme Christ, 7 Jean Degros, 8 Christian Baltzer, 9 Roger Antoine, 10 Henri Grange, 11 Bernard Mayeur, 12 Jean-Paul Beugnot, 13 Philippe Baillet, 14 Louis Bertorelle (Coach: André Buffière)

1961 EuroBasket: finished 4th among 19 teams

4 Lucien Sedat, 5 Jean-Pierre Goisbault, 6 Jérôme Christ, 7 Michel Housse, 9 Michel Le Ray, 10 Henri Grange, 11 Bernard Mayeur, 12 Jean-Paul Beugnot, 13 Christian Baltzer, 14 André Souvré, 15 Jean-Claude Vergne, 16 Michel Rat (Coach: André Buffière)

1963 FIBA World Cup: finished 5th among 13 teams

4 Max Dorigo, 5 Jean-Daniel Vinson, 6 Alain Gilles, 7 Jean Degros, 8 Christian Baltzer, 9 Michel Le Ray, 10 Henri Grange, 11 Bernard Mayeur, 12 Jean-Baptiste Ré, 13 Michel Rat, 14 Raphaël Ruiz, 15 Jean-Claude Lefebvre (Coach: André Buffière)

1963 EuroBasket: finished 13th among 16 teams

4 Michel Rat, 5 Claude Marc, 6 Jean-Claude Bonato, 7 Jean Degros, 8 Christian Baltzer, 9 Jacques Caballé, 10 Jean-Pierre Goisbault, 11 Alain Gilles, 12 Jean-Baptiste Ré, 13 Michel Audureau, 14 Philippe Baillet, 15 Jean-Claude Lefebvre (Coach: André Buffière)

1965 EuroBasket: finished 9th among 16 teams

4 Gérard Capron, 5 Laurent Dorigo, 6 Alain Gilles, 7 Jean Degros, 8 Hubert Papin, 9 Michel Le Ray, 10 Ferruccio Biasucci, 11 Daniel Ledent, 12 Jean-Marie Jouaret, 13 Maurice Boulois, 14 Jean-Claude Bonato, 15 Alain Schol (Coach: Joë Jaunay)

1967 EuroBasket: finished 11th among 16 teams

4 Francis Schneider, 5 Charles Tassin, 6 Alain Gilles, 7 Jean Degros, 8 Alain Schol, 9 Michel Le Ray, 10 Jean-Claude Bonato, 11 Jean-Pierre Staelens, 12 Michel Longueville, 13 Gérard Lespinasse, 14 Claude Peter, 15 Alain Durand (Coach: Joë Jaunay)

1971 EuroBasket: finished 10th among 12 teams

4 Daniel Ledent, 5 Charles Tassin, 6 Alain Gilles, 7 Carlo Wilm, 8 Claude Gasnal, 9 Bernard Magnin, 10 Jean-Claude Bonato, 11 Jean-Pierre Staelens, 12 Michel Longueville, 13 Gérard Lespinasse, 14 Jacques Cachemire, 15 Alain Durand (Coach: Joë Jaunay)

1973 EuroBasket: finished 10th among 12 teams

4 Pierre Galle, 5 Daniel Ledent, 6 Jean-Michel Sénégal, 7 Charles Tassin, 8 Yves-Marie Vérove, 9 Jean-Louis Vacher, 10 Jean-Claude Bonato, 11 Firmin Onissah, 12 Claude Gasnal, 13 Jacques Cachemire, 14 Jacky Lamothe, 15 Patrick Demars (Coach: Joë Jaunay)

1977 EuroBasket: finished 11th among 12 teams

4 Barry White, 5 Jean-Louis Vacher, 6 Alain Gilles, 7 Alain Larrouquis, 8 Alain Durand, 9 Didier Dobbels, 10 Mathieu Bisséni, 11 Hervé Dubuisson, 12 Jacky Lamothe, 13 Jacques Cachemire, 14 Éric Beugnot, 15 Roger Duquesnoy (Coach: Pierre Dao)

1979 EuroBasket: finished 8th among 12 teams

4 Victor Boistol, 5 Jean-Michel Sénégal, 6 Saint-Ange Vebobe, 7 Jacques Monclar, 8 Bill Cain, 9 George Brosterhous, 10 Mathieu Bisséni, 11 Hervé Dubuisson, 12 Jacky Lamothe, 13 Jacques Cachemire, 14 Éric Beugnot, 15 Apollo Faye (Coach: Pierre Dao)

1981 EuroBasket: finished 8th among 12 teams

4 Patrick Cham, 5 Jean-Michel Sénégal, 6 Frédéric Hufnagel, 7 Jacques Monclar, 8 Philippe Szanyiel, 9 Didier Dobbels, 10 Richard Dacoury, 11 Hervé Dubuisson, 12 Jacky Lamothe, 13 Jacques Cachemire, 14 Éric Beugnot, 15 Jean-Luc Deganis (Coach: Pierre Dao)

1983 EuroBasket: finished 5th among 12 teams

4 Alain Larrouquis, 5 Jean-Michel Sénégal, 6 Richard Dacoury, 7 Jacques Monclar, 8 Philippe Szanyiel, 9 George Brosterhous, 10 Apollo Faye, 11 Hervé Dubuisson, 12 Daniel Haquet, 13 Jacques Cachemire, 14 Éric Beugnot, 15 Georges Vestris (Coach: Pierre Dao)

1984 Olympic Games: finished 11th among 12 teams

4 Grégor Beugnot, 5 Jean-Michel Sénégal, 6 Richard Dacoury, 7 Jacques Monclar, 8 Philippe Szanyiel, 9 Stéphane Ostrowski, 10 Jean-Luc Deganis, 11 Hervé Dubuisson, 12 Patrick Cham, 13 Bangaly Kaba, 14 Éric Beugnot, 15 Georges Vestris (Coach: Jean Luent)

1985 EuroBasket: finished 6th among 12 teams

4 Frédéric Hufnagel, 5 Franck Cazalon, 6 Patrick Cham, 7 Jacques Monclar, 8 Philippe Szanyiel, 9 Stéphane Ostrowski, 10 Christophe Grégoire, 11 Hervé Dubuisson, 12 Daniel Haquet, 13 Christian Garnier, 14 Jean-Louis Hersin, 15 Valéry Demory (Coach: Jean Luent)

1986 FIBA World Cup: finished 13th among 24 teams

4 Frédéric Hufnagel, 5 Valéry Demory, 6 Patrick Cham, 7 Jacques Monclar, 8 Richard Dacoury, 9 Stéphane Ostrowski, 10 Christian Garnier, 11 Hervé Dubuisson, 12 Daniel Haquet, 13 Jean-Luc Deganis, 14 Éric Beugnot, 15 Georges Vestris (Coach: Jean Galle)

1987 EuroBasket: finished 9th among 12 teams

4 Frédéric Hufnagel, 5 Valéry Demory, 6 Patrick Cham, 7 Richard Dacoury, 8 Frédéric Monetti, 9 Stéphane Ostrowski, 10 Pierre Bressant, 11 Hervé Dubuisson, 12 Jean-Louis Hersin, 13 Jean-Luc Deganis, 14 Éric Beugnot, 15 Georges Vestris (Coach: Jean Galle)

1989 EuroBasket: finished 6th among 8 teams

4 Frédéric Forte, 5 Jim Bilba, 6 Grégor Beugnot, 7 Richard Dacoury, 8 Stéphane Lauvergne, 9 Stéphane Ostrowski, 10 Éric Occansey, 11 Hervé Dubuisson, 12 Patrick Cham, 13 Skeeter Jackson, 14 Franck Butter, 15 Georges Vestris (Coach: Francis Jordane)

1991 EuroBasket: finished 4th among 8 teams

4 Frédéric Forte, 5 Valéry Demory, 6 Antoine Rigaudeau, 7 Richard Dacoury, 8 Philippe Szanyiel, 9 Stéphane Ostrowski, 10 Hugues Occansey, 11 Didier Gadou, 12 Félix Courtinard, 13 Georges Adams, 14 Jim Deines, 15 Jim Bilba (Coach: Francis Jordane)

1993 EuroBasket: finished 7th among 16 teams

4 Frédéric Forte, 5 Olivier Allinéi, 6 Christophe Soulé, 7 Stéphane Risacher, 8 Yann Bonato, 9 Stéphane Ostrowski, 10 Bruno Coqueran, 11 Antoine Rigaudeau, 12 Félix Courtinard, 13 Georges Adams, 14 Thierry Gadou, 15 Jim Bilba (Coach: Francis Jordane)

1995 EuroBasket: finished 8th among 14 teams

4 Frédéric Forte, 5 Moustapha Sonko, 6 Antoine Rigaudeau, 7 Bruno Hamm, 8 Yann Bonato, 9 Stéphane Ostrowski, 10 Hugues Occansey, 11 Thierry Gadou, 12 Didier Gadou, 13 Franck Butter, 14 Jim Bilba, 15 Frédéric Domon (Coach: Michel Gomez)

1997 EuroBasket: finished 10th among 16 teams

4 Laurent Pluvy, 5 Jérôme Moïso, 6 Fabien Dubos, 7 Laurent Foirest, 8 Yann Bonato, 9 Frédéric Fauthoux, 10 Stéphane Risacher, 11 Thierry Gadou, 12 Cyril Julian, 13 Georges Adams, 14 Laurent Sciarra, 15 Rémi Rippert (Coach: Jean-Pierre de Vincenzi)

1999 EuroBasket: finished 4th among 16 teams

4 Moustapha Sonko, 5 Alain Digbeu, 6 Antoine Rigaudeau, 7 Laurent Foirest, 8 Laurent Sciarra, 9 Tariq Abdul-Wahad, 10 Stéphane Risacher, 11 Thierry Gadou, 12 Cyril Julian, 13 Frédéric Weis, 14 Jim Bilba, 15 Ronnie Smith (Coach: Jean-Pierre de Vincenzi)

2000 Olympic Games: finished (silver) among 12 teams

4 Moustapha Sonko, 5 Laurent Sciarra, 6 Antoine Rigaudeau, 7 Laurent Foirest, 8 Yann Bonato, 9 Makan Dioumassi, 10 Stéphane Risacher, 11 Thierry Gadou, 12 Cyril Julian, 13 Crawford Palmer, 14 Jim Bilba, 15 Frédéric Weis (Coach: Jean-Pierre de Vincenzi)

2001 EuroBasket: finished 6th among 16 teams

4 Éric Micoud, 5 Laurent Sciarra, 6 Tony Parker, 7 Laurent Foirest, 8 Alain Digbeu, 9 Makan Dioumassi, 10 Stéphane Risacher, 11 Vassil Evtimov, 12 Cyril Julian, 13 Crawford Palmer, 14 Jim Bilba, 15 Frédéric Weis (Coach: Alain Weisz)

2003 EuroBasket: finished 4th among 16 teams

4 Moustapha Sonko, 5 Tariq Abdul-Wahad, 6 Jérôme Moïso, 7 Laurent Foirest, 8 Alain Digbeu, 9 Tony Parker, 10 Makan Dioumassi, 11 Florent Piétrus, 12 Cyril Julian, 13 Boris Diaw, 14 Thierry Rupert, 15 Ronny Turiaf (Coach: Alain Weisz)

2005 EuroBasket: finished (bronze) among 16 teams

4 Frédéric Fauthoux, 5 Mickaël Gelabale, 6 Antoine Rigaudeau, 7 Cyril Julian, 8 Mickaël Piétrus, 9 Tony Parker, 10 Mamoutou Diarra, 11 Florent Piétrus, 12 Jérôme Schmitt, 13 Boris Diaw, 14 Frédéric Weis, 15 Sacha Giffa (Coach: Claude Bergeaud)

2006 FIBA World Cup: finished 5th among 24 teams

4 Joseph Gomis, 5 Mickaël Gelabale, 6 Aymeric Jeanneau, 7 Laurent Foirest, 8 Mickaël Piétrus, 9 Mamoutou Diarra, 10 Yannick Bokolo, 11 Florent Piétrus, 12 Johan Petro, 13 Boris Diaw, 14 Ronny Turiaf, 15 Frédéric Weis (Coach: Claude Bergeaud)

2007 EuroBasket: finished 8th among 16 teams

4 Joseph Gomis, 5 Pape Badiane, 6 Sacha Giffa, 7 Yohann Sangaré, 8 Yakhouba Diawara, 9 Tony Parker, 10 Cédric Ferchaud, 11 Florent Piétrus, 12 Tariq Kirksay, 13 Boris Diaw, 14 Ronny Turiaf, 15 Frédéric Weis (Coach: Claude Bergeaud)

2009 EuroBasket: finished 5th among 16 teams

4 Antoine Diot, 5 Nicolas Batum, 6 Aymeric Jeanneau, 7 Alain Koffi, 8 Ian Mahinmi, 9 Tony Parker, 10 Yannick Bokolo, 11 Florent Piétrus, 12 Nando de Colo, 13 Boris Diaw, 14 Ronny Turiaf, 15 Ali Traoré (Coach: Vincent Collet)

2010 FIBA World Cup: finished 13th among 24 teams

4 Andrew Albicy, 5 Nicolas Batum, 6 Fabien Causeur, 7 Alain Koffi, 8 Ian Mahinmi, 9 Edwin Jackson, 10 Yannick Bokolo, 11 Florent Piétrus, 12 Nando de Colo, 13 Boris Diaw, 14 Mickaël Gelabale, 15 Ali Traoré (Coach: Vincent Collet)

2011 EuroBasket: finished (silver) among 24 teams

4 Joakim Noah, 5 Nicolas Batum, 6 Kevin Séraphin, 7 Andrew Albicy, 8 Charles Lombahe-Kahudi, 9 Tony Parker, 10 Ali Traoré, 11 Florent Piétrus, 12 Nando de Colo, 13 Boris Diaw (C), 14 Steed Tchicamboud, 15 Mickaël Gelabale (Coach: Vincent Collet)

2012 Olympic Games: finished 6th among 12 teams

4 Kevin Seraphin, 5 Nicolas Batum, 6 Fabien Causeur, 7 Yakhouba Diawara, 8 Ali Traore, 9 Tony Parker, 10 Yannick Bokolo, 11 Florent Piétrus, 12 Nando de Colo, 13 Boris Diaw (C), 14 Ronny Turiaf, 15 Mickaël Gelabale (Coach: Vincent Collet)

2013 EuroBasket: finished (gold) among 24 teams

4 Joffrey Lauvergne, 5 Nicolas Batum, 6 Antoine Diot, 7 Johan Petro, 8 Charles Lombahe-Kahudi, 9 Tony Parker (MVP), 10 Thomas Heurtel, 11 Florent Piétrus, 12 Nando de Colo, 13 Boris Diaw (C), 14 Alexis Ajinça, 15 Mickaël Gelabale (Coach: Vincent Collet)

2014 FIBA World Cup: finished (bronze) among 24 teams

4 Thomas Heurtel, 5 Nicolas Batum, 6 Antoine Diot, 7 Joffrey Lauvergne, 8 Charles Lombahe-Kahudi, 9 Edwin Jackson, 10 Evan Fournier, 11 Florent Piétrus, 12 Rudy Gobert, 13 Boris Diaw (C), 14 Kim Tillie, 15 Mickaël Gelabale (Coach: Vincent Collet)

2015 EuroBasket: finished (bronze) among 24 teams

4 Léo Westermann, 5 Nicolas Batum, 7 Joffrey Lauvergne, 8 Charles Lombahe-Kahudi, 9 Tony Parker, 10 Evan Fournier, 11 Florent Piétrus, 12 Nando de Colo, 13 Boris Diaw (C), 15 Mickaël Gelabale, 16 Rudy Gobert, 19 Mouhammadou Jaiteh (Coach: Vincent Collet)

2016 Olympic Games: finished 6th among 12 teams

4 Thomas Heurtel, 5 Nicolas Batum, 6 Antoine Diot, 7 Joffrey Lauvergne, 8 Charles Lombahe-Kahudi, 9 Tony Parker, 11 Florent Piétrus, 12 Nando de Colo, 13 Boris Diaw (C), 15 Mickaël Gelabale, 16 Rudy Gobert, 17 Kim Tillie (Coach: Vincent Collet)

2017 EuroBasket: finished 12th among 24 teams

1 Kevin Séraphin, 4 Thomas Heurtel, 6 Antoine Diot, 7 Joffrey Lauvergne, 10 Evan Fournier, 12 Nando de Colo, 13 Boris Diaw (C),
15 Léo Westermann, 17 Vincent Poirier, 25 Louis Labeyrie, 33 Axel Toupane, 91 Edwin Jackson (Coach: Vincent Collet)

2019 FIBA World Cup: finished (bronze) among 32 teams

1 Frank Ntilikina, 2 Amath M'Baye, 5 Nicolas Batum (C), 10 Evan Fournier, 12 Nando de Colo, 17 Vincent Poirier, 21 Andrew Albicy,
25 Louis Labeyrie, 26 Mathias Lessort, 27 Rudy Gobert, 33 Axel Toupane, 90 Paul Lacombe (Coach: Vincent Collet)

2020 Olympic Games: finished (silver) among 12 teams

1 Frank Ntilikina, 3 Timothé Luwawu-Cabarrot, 4 Thomas Heurtel, 5 Nicolas Batum (C), 7 Guerschon Yabusele, 10 Evan Fournier,
12 Nando de Colo, 17 Vincent Poirier, 21 Andrew Albicy, 27 Rudy Gobert, 28 Petr Cornelie, 93 Moustapha Fall (Coach: Vincent Collet)

2022 EuroBasket: finished (silver) among 24 teams

0 Élie Okobo, 2 Amath M'Baye, 3 Timothé Luwawu-Cabarrot, 4 Thomas Heurtel, 7 Guerschon Yabusele, 10 Evan Fournier (C),
11 Théo Maledon, 17 Vincent Poirier, 21 Andrew Albicy, 22 Terry Tarpey, 27 Rudy Gobert, 93 Moustapha Fall (Coach: Vincent Collet)

2023 FIBA World Cup: finished 18th among 32 teams

00 Sylvain Francisco, 0 Élie Okobo, 5 Nicolas Batum (C), 7 Guerschon Yabusele, 10 Evan Fournier, 12 Nando de Colo, 22 Terry Tarpey,
24 Yakuba Ouattara, 26 Mathias Lessort, 27 Rudy Gobert, 30 Isaïa Cordinier, 93 Moustapha Fall (Coach: Vincent Collet)

2024 Olympic Games: finished (silver) among 12 teams

1 Frank Ntilikina, 5 Nicolas Batum (C), 6 Andrew Albicy, 7 Guerschon Yabusele, 8 Isaïa Cordinier, 10 Evan Fournier, 12 Nando de Colo,
26 Mathias Lessort, 27 Rudy Gobert, 32 Victor Wembanyama, 85 Matthew Strazel, 99 Bilal Coulibaly (Coach: Vincent Collet)

2025 EuroBasket: finished 9th among 24 teams

00 Sylvain Francisco, 0 Élie Okobo, 2 Nadir Hifi, 3 Timothé Luwawu-Cabarrot, 7 Guerschon Yabusele (C), 8 Isaïa Cordinier,
11 Théo Maledon, 14 Mam Jaiteh, 21 Zaccharie Risacher, 34 Jaylen Hoard, 44 Alex Sarr, 99 Bilal Coulibaly (Coach: Frédéric Fauthoux)

== Notable players and statistics ==
=== Retired numbers ===
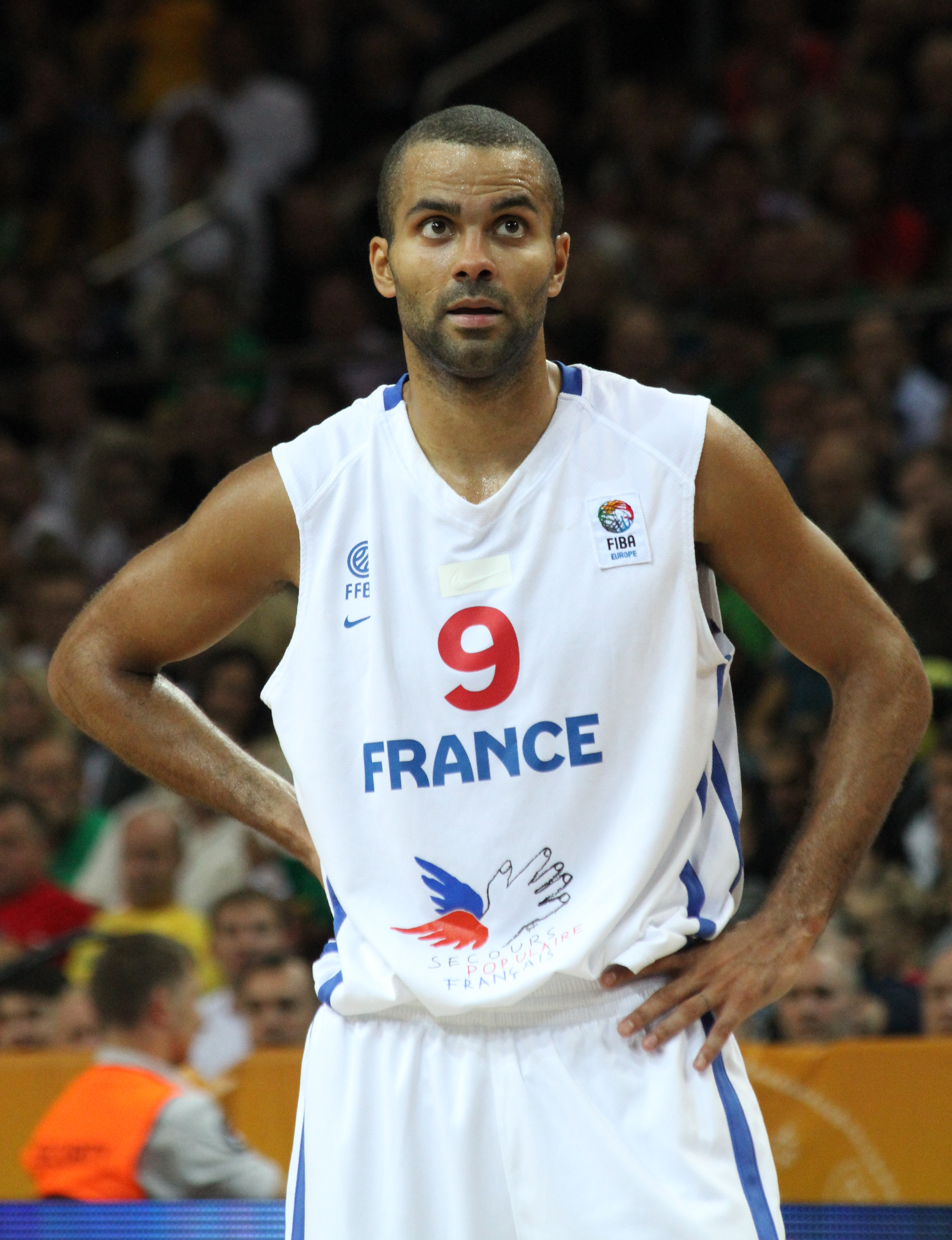
Tony Parker, who was the MVP of the EuroBasket 2013, is the only player to have his number retired.

The French Basketball Federation retired Tony Parker's number 9 jersey on 12 July 2024, ahead of a friendly game against Serbia. It was the first jersey number retirement in France in any sport.

No.	Player	Position	Tenure	Ceremony date	Ref
**9**	Tony Parker	PG	2000–2016	12 July 2024	

=== Historical key figures ===
- Tariq Abdul-Wahad – former forward for the Sacramento Kings, Orlando Magic, Denver Nuggets, Dallas Mavericks
- Alexis Ajinça – former center for the Charlotte Bobcats, Dallas Mavericks, Toronto Raptors, New Orleans Pelicans
- Roger Antoine – FIBA European Selection (1964)
- Nicolas Batum – guard-forward for the Portland Trail Blazers, Charlotte Hornets, Los Angeles Clippers, Philadelphia 76ers
- Rodrigue Beaubois – former guard for the Dallas Mavericks
- Louis Bertorelle – French Basketball Hall of Fame (2008)
- Éric Beugnot – 2× FIBA European Selection (1981 2×)
- Jean-Paul Beugnot – FIBA's 50 Greatest Players (1991)
- Jim Bilba – EuroLeague champion (1993), FIBA EuroStar (1999)
- Yann Bonato – FIBA EuroStar (1996)
- André Buffière – French Basketball Hall of Fame (2004)
- Robert Busnel – French basketball star whom the French Basketball Cup is named after, in his honor
- Jacques Cachemire – 3× FIBA European Selection (1974, 1975, 1979)
- Richard Dacoury – EuroLeague champion (1993), 3× FIBA European Selection (1987 2×, 1991), FIBA EuroStar (1996)
- René Chocat – French Basketball Hall of Fame (2012)
- Nando de Colo – former guard for the San Antonio Spurs, Toronto Raptors
- Jean Degros – FIBA European Selection (1966)
- Boris Diaw – former forward-center for the Atlanta Hawks, Phoenix Suns, Charlotte Bobcats, San Antonio Spurs, Utah Jazz
- Yakhouba Diawara – former guard-forward for the Denver Nuggets, Miami Heat
- Maxime Dorigo – French Basketball Hall of Fame (2004)
- Hervé Dubuisson – FIBA European Selection (1980)
- Evan Fournier – guard-forward for the Denver Nuggets, Orlando Magic, Boston Celtics, New York Knicks, Detroit Pistons
- Jacques Flouret – French Basketball Hall of Fame (2010)
- Mickaël Gelabale – former forward for the Seattle SuperSonics, Minnesota Timberwolves
- Alain Gilles – FIBA's 50 Greatest Players (1991)
- Rudy Gobert – center for the Utah Jazz, Minnesota Timberwolves
- Joffrey Lauvergne – former forward-center for the Denver Nuggets, Oklahoma City Thunder, Chicago Bulls, San Antonio Spurs
- Ian Mahinmi – former center for the San Antonio Spurs, Dallas Mavericks, Indiana Pacers, Washington Wizards
- Jerome Moiso – former forward-center for the Boston Celtics, Charlotte Hornets, New Orleans Hornets, Toronto Raptors, New Jersey Nets, Cleveland Cavaliers
- Robert Monclar – French Basketball Hall of Fame (2004)
- Joakim Noah – former center for the Chicago Bulls, New York Knicks, Memphis Grizzlies, Los Angeles Clippers
- Stéphane Ostrowski – 5× FIBA European Selection (1990, 1991 2×, 1995 2×)
- Tony Parker – EuroBasket MVP (2013), EuroBasket All-Tournament Team (2003, 2011, 2013)
- Jean Perniceni – French Basketball Hall of Fame (2009)
- Jacques Perrier – French Basketball Hall of Fame (2006)
- Johan Petro – former center for the Seattle SuperSonics / Oklahoma City Thunder, Denver Nuggets, New Jersey Nets, Atlanta Hawks
- Mickaël Piétrus – former guard-forward for the Golden State Warriors, Orlando Magic, Phoenix Suns, Boston Celtics, Toronto Raptors
- Antoine Rigaudeau – former guard for the Dallas Mavericks
- Kevin Séraphin – former forward-center for the Washington Wizards, New York Knicks, Indiana Pacers
- Jean-Pierre Staelens – FIBA European Selection (1973)
- Philippe Szanyiel – FIBA European Selection (1991)
- Axel Toupane – former guard for the Denver Nuggets, Milwaukee Bucks, New Orleans Pelicans
- Ronny Turiaf – former forward-center for the Los Angeles Lakers, Golden State Warriors, New York Knicks, ASVEL Lyon-Villeurbanne, Washington Wizards, Miami Heat, Los Angeles Clippers, Minnesota Timberwolves
- Frédéric Weis – 2000 Summer Olympics (silver medalist)

=== Players with the most games played ===
- Players in **bold** are still active.

As of 10 August 2024

Rank	Player	Caps
1.	Hervé Dubuisson	259
2.	Jacques Cachemire	250
3.	Boris Diaw	247
4.	Florent Piétrus	230
5.	Éric Beugnot	212
6.	Jean-Michel Sénégal	210
7.	Nando de Colo	209
8.	Jacques Monclar	201
9.	Stéphane Ostrowski	193
10.	Philippe Szanyiel	192
11.	Tony Parker	181
12.	Nicolas Batum	177
13.	Jean-Claude Bonato	174
14.	Jim Bilba	170
15.	Alain Gilles	160
15.	Richard Dacoury	160
17.	Georges Vestris	157
18.	Mickaël Gelabale	156
19.	Jacky Lamothe	155
20.	Laurent Foirest	150

=== Players with the most points scored ===
- Players in **bold** are still active.

As of 30 August 2026

Rank	Player	Points scored
1.	Hervé Dubuisson	3,913
2.	Jacques Cachemire	2,843
3.	Stéphane Ostrowski	2,813
4.	Tony Parker	2,741
5.	Éric Beugnot	2,491
6.	Philippe Szanyiel	2,359
7.	Alain Gilles	2,286
8.	Richard Dacoury	2,232
9.	Nando de Colo	2,194
10.	Jean-Claude Bonato	2,147
11.	Boris Diaw	2,090
12.	Nicolas Batum	1,783
13.	Antoine Rigaudeau	1,500
14.	**Evan Fournier**	1,343
15.	Laurent Foirest	1,292
16.	Florent Pietrus	1,210
17.	Jim Bilba	1,198
18.	Yann Bonato	1,164
19.	Mickaël Gelabale	1,122
20.	Jean-Paul Beugnot	1,081

=== Highest individual scoring games ===
- Players in **bold** are still active.

Rank	Player	Date	Competition	Opponent	Points scored
1.	Hervé Dubuisson	21 November 1985	1986 FIBA World Cup Qualification	Greece	51
2.	Hervé Dubuisson	28 June 1981	Friendly	Italy	39
2.	Hervé Dubuisson	7 June 1985	EuroBasket 1985	Poland	39
4.	Hervé Dubuisson	21 May 1984	1984 Summer Olympics Qualification	Sweden	38
4.	Yann Bonato	30 June 1995	EuroBasket 1995	FR Yugoslavia	38
6.	Hervé Dubuisson	17 May 1980	1980 Summer Olympics Qualification	Czechoslovakia	37
6.	Richard Dacoury	26 May 1989	Friendly	West Germany	37
6.	Tony Parker	20 September 2008	EuroBasket 2009 Qualification	Turkey	37
9.	Hervé Dubuisson	9 June 1987	EuroBasket 1987	Israel	36
9.	Tony Parker	4 September 2007	EuroBasket 2007	Italy	36
9.	**Guerschon Yabusele**	2 September 2025	EuroBasket 2025	Poland	36

== Head-to-head record ==
The following tables summarizes the all-time competitive record for the France men's national basketball team, broken down by confederation. Competitive results are inclusive of games in the Olympic Games, FIBA World Cup, EuroBasket, and qualifying campaigns for these competitions. This record excludes the results of international friendlies, along with minor tournaments. France has played competitive games against 75 current and former national teams.

As of 30 August 2026

Positive Record Neutral Record Negative Record

Nations	Pld	W	L	Win %	Confederation
Albania	2	2	0	100.0%	FIBA Europe
Algeria	1	1	0	100.0%	FIBA Africa
Angola	1	1	0	100.0%	FIBA Africa
Argentina	6	1	5	16.7%	FIBA Americas
Australia	4	3	1	75.0%	FIBA Oceania
Austria	10	9	1	90.0%	FIBA Europe
Belarus	2	2	0	100.0%	FIBA Europe
Belgium	21	18	3	85.7%	FIBA Europe
Bosnia and Herzegovina	11	10	1	90.9%	FIBA Europe
Brazil	9	5	4	55.5%	FIBA Americas
Bulgaria	27	15	12	55.6%	FIBA Europe
Canada	9	7	2	77.7%	FIBA Americas
Chile	4	3	1	75.5%	FIBA Americas
China	4	2	2	50.0%	FIBA Asia
Chinese Taipei	1	1	0	100.0%	FIBA Asia
Croatia	10	7	3	70.0%	FIBA Europe
Cuba	2	2	0	100.0%	FIBA Americas
Cyprus	2	2	0	100.0%	FIBA Europe
Czech Republic (Note: Includes matches against Czechoslovakia.)	25	14	11	56.0%	FIBA Europe
Denmark	4	4	0	100.0%	FIBA Europe
Dominican Republic	1	1	0	100.0%	FIBA Americas
East Germany	5	4	1	80.0%	FIBA Europe
Ecuador	1	1	0	100.0%	FIBA Americas
Egypt	7	4	3	57.1%	FIBA Africa
England	4	4	0	100.0%	FIBA Europe
Estonia	5	3	2	60.0%	FIBA Europe
Finland	19	14	5	73.6%	FIBA Europe
Georgia	1	0	1	00.0%	FIBA Europe
Germany	28	18	10	64.3%	FIBA Europe
Great Britain	9	7	2	77.8%	FIBA Europe
Greece	30	13	17	43.3%	FIBA Europe
Hungary	21	12	9	57.1%	FIBA Europe
Iceland	3	3	0	100.0%	FIBA Europe
Iran	3	3	0	100.0%	FIBA Asia
Ireland	2	2	0	100.0%	FIBA Europe
Israel	27	17	10	62.9%	FIBA Europe
Italy	30	16	14	53.3%	FIBA Europe
Japan	2	2	0	100.0%	FIBA Asia
Jordan	1	1	0	100.0%	FIBA Asia
Latvia	10	7	3	70.0%	FIBA Europe
Lebanon	4	3	1	75.0%	FIBA Asia
Lithuania	19	12	7	63.2%	FIBA Europe
Luxembourg	4	4	0	100.0%	FIBA Europe
Mexico	2	1	1	50.0%	FIBA Americas
Montenegro	4	3	1	75.0%	FIBA Europe
Netherlands	13	10	3	76.9%	FIBA Europe
New Zealand	3	2	1	66.7%	FIBA Oceania
Nigeria	2	2	0	100.0%	FIBA Africa
North Macedonia	2	2	0	100.0%	FIBA Europe
Norway	1	1	0	100.0%	FIBA Europe
Panama	1	1	0	100.0%	FIBA Americas
Peru	1	1	0	100.0%	FIBA Americas
Philippines	4	2	2	50.0%	FIBA Asia
Poland	38	26	12	68.4%	FIBA Europe
Portugal	2	2	0	100.0%	FIBA Europe
Puerto Rico	1	1	0	100.0%	FIBA Americas
Romania	12	6	6	50.0%	FIBA Europe
Russia (Note: Includes matches against Soviet Union.)	32	9	23	28.1%	FIBA Europe
Scotland	4	4	0	100.0%	FIBA Europe
Serbia (Note: Includes matches against Yugoslavia and Serbia and Montenegro.)	29	8	21	27.5%	FIBA Europe
Singapore	1	1	0	100.0%	FIBA Asia
South Korea	1	1	0	100.0%	FIBA Asia
Slovenia	15	9	6	60.0%	FIBA Europe
Spain	37	10	27	27.0%	FIBA Europe
Sweden	12	12	0	100.0%	FIBA Europe
Switzerland	8	8	0	100.0%	FIBA Europe
Syria	1	1	0	100.0%	FIBA Asia
Tunisia	1	1	0	100.0%	FIBA Africa
Turkey	25	18	7	64.0%	FIBA Europe
Ukraine	4	2	2	50.0%	FIBA Europe
United States	13	2	11	15.4%	FIBA Americas
Uruguay	7	4	3	57.1%	FIBA Americas
Venezuela	2	2	0	100.0%	FIBA Americas
Total	669	412	257	61.58%	

== Media coverage ==
France's matches are currently televised by TF1 Group and beIN Sports.

== Kit supplier ==
=== Manufacturer ===
- 2003–2013: Nike
- 2014–2017: Adidas
- 2017–present: Jordan Brand

=== Sponsor ===
- 2019–2022: Amazon
- 2019–present: Suzuki

== See also ==
- Sport in France
- France women's national basketball team
- France men's national under-20 basketball team
- France men's national under-19 basketball team
- France men's national under-17 basketball team
- France men's national 3x3 team
