= EuroBasket 1949 =

International basketball event

Tournament details
- Host country: Egypt
- City: Cairo
- Dates: 15–22 May
- Teams: 7
- Venue(s): 1 (in 1 host city)

Final positions
- Champions: Egypt (1st title)
- Runners-up: France
- Third place: Greece
- Fourth place: Turkey

Tournament statistics
- MVP: (Turkey) Hüseyin Öztürk
- Top scorer: (Turkey) Hüseyin Öztürk (19.3 points per game)

The 1949 FIBA European Championship, commonly called FIBA EuroBasket 1949, was the sixth FIBA EuroBasket regional basketball championship, held by FIBA. Seven national teams affiliated with the International Basketball Federation (FIBA) took part in the competition. The competition was hosted by Egypt after the Soviet Union refused to host it, as was the Soviet's obligation as defending champion under FIBA Europe rules. Czechoslovakia, the silver medallist at EuroBasket 1947, had been the host that year, so was not asked to repeat hosting duties and those duties fell to bronze medallist Egypt.

The event took place in Cairo, with travel difficulties cited by many nations as the reason for not competing. Only four of the seven competing teams were European.

== Results ==
The 1949 competition was in the same format as EuroBasket 1939. Each team played each of the other teams once. A win was worth 2 standings points, a loss worth 1. The rankings were based on those standing points.

=== Results ===
Greece	46–28	Netherlands
Egypt	71–44	Syria
Lebanon	36–45	Greece
France	58–35	Netherlands
Netherlands	40–37	Syria
France	43–26	Lebanon
Greece	54–41	Turkey
France	47–33	Turkey
Lebanon	28–38	Syria
Netherlands	23–54	Egypt
France	41–36	Greece
Lebanon	30–57	Egypt
Syria	33–43	Turkey
Lebanon	22–34	Netherlands
Turkey	44–57	Egypt
Syria	45–49	Greece
Turkey	38–24	Netherlands
Egypt	50–39	Greece
France	56–22	Syria
Turkey	48–41	Lebanon
France	36–57	Egypt

== Final standings ==
Pos	Team	Pld	W	L	PF	PA	PD	Pts	Final Result
1	Egypt	6	6	0	346	216	+130	12	Champion
2	France	6	5	1	281	199	+82	11	Runner-up
3	Greece	6	4	2	269	241	+28	10	Third Place
4	Turkey	6	3	3	247	256	−9	9	
5	Netherlands	6	2	4	174	255	−81	8	
6	Syria	6	1	5	219	287	−68	7	
7	Lebanon	6	0	6	183	265	−82	6	

Source: fibaeurope.com

1949 FIBA EuroBasket champions

Egypt
1st title

== Team rosters ==
1. Egypt: Youssef Mohammed Abbas, Youssef Abou Ouf, Fouad Abdel Meguid El-Kheir, Gabriel Armand "Gaby" Catafago, Salah El-Dine Nessim, Abdel Rahman Hafez Ismail, Hussein Kamel Montasser, Mohamed Ali Ahmed El-Rashidy, Wahid Chafik Saleh, Mohammed Mahmud Soliman, Albert Fahmy Tadros, Medhat Youssef Mohamed, (Team Captain: Ahmed Hassan) (Coach: Carmine "Nello" Paratore)

2. France: André Buffière, Robert Busnel, René Chocat, Jacques Dessemme, Maurice Desaymonnet, Louis Devoti, Jacques Favory, Fernand Guillou, Jean Perniceni, Jean-Pierre Salignon, Jean Swidzinski, André Vacheresse, Jacques Freimuller, Marc Quiblier (Coach: Robert Busnel)

3. Greece: Alekos Apostolidis, Stelios Arvanitis, Nikos Bournelos, Thanasis Kostopoulos, Ioannis Lambrou, Faidon Matthaiou, Nikos Nomikos, Missas Pantazopoulos, Nikos Skylakakis, Alekos Spanoudakis, Takis Taliadoros, Sokratis Apostolidis, Nikos Milas (Coach: Georgios Karatzopoulos)

4. Turkey: Hüseyin Öztürk, Samim Göreç, Avram Barokas, Vitali Benazus, Haşim Tankut, Ali Uras, Mehmet Ali Yalım, Tevfik Tankut, Sacit Seldüz, Erdoğan Partener, Ayduk Koray, Candaş Tekeli
