= French Basketball Academy =

- Established: 2004
- Location: France
- Type: Hall of Fame

The French Basketball Academy (French: Académie du basket-ball français) is a hall of fame that honors individuals (or whole teams) that have contributed to the spread and improvement of French basketball, through their sporting contributions, and their actions in support of the game in France. Inductees are chosen by the Hall's Honorary committee. It was founded in 2004.

== Honorary committee ==
Committee of Honor	Members
Honorary committee	Gérard Bosc (President); Jean-Pierre Siutat (President of French Basketball Federation (FFBB)); Jacques Huguet (Representative of the Board of Honor of the FFBB); Martine Campi; Jacky Chazalon; Geneviève Guinchard; Robert Blanchard; André Buffière; Maxime Dorigo; Hervé Dubuisson; Pierre Seillant; Jacques Marchand

== Inductees ==
Year Inducted	Members
2004	Jacky Chazalon; Roger Antoine; Christian Baltzer; Jean-Paul Beugnot; André Buffière; Maxime Dorigo; Hervé Dubuisson; Alain Gilles
2005	Anne-Marie Colchen; Irène Guidotti; Robert Blanchard; Robert Busnel; Richard Dacoury; Jacques Dessemme; Jacques Marchand
2006	Players: Robert Monclar; Jacques Perrier; Élisabeth Riffiod; Édith Tavert-Kloechner; Executives: Raphaël de Barros; Pioneers: Marcel Barillé
2007	Players: Yannick Stephan; Henri Grange; Jean Degros; Michel Canque; Jacques Cachemire; Pioneers: Étienne Roland; Teams: 1934 Senior French Women's team: 1934 Women's World Games: Gold; 1948 Senior French Men's Team: 1948 Summer Olympic Games: Silver
2008	Players: Louis Bertorelle; Jean-Michel Senegal; Catherine Malfois; Coaches: Georgette Coste-Venitien; Pioneers: Bernard Gasnal; Personalities: Pierre Tessier
2009	Players: Jean-Claude Bonato; Jean Perniceni; Odile Santaniello; Coaches: Joë Jaunay; Pioneers: André Tondeur
2010	Players: Antoine Rigaudeau; Éric Beugnot; Executives: Pierre Seillant; Pioneers: Jacques Flouret; Teams: 2000 Senior French Men's Team: 2000 Summer Olympic Games: Silver
2011	Players: Jacques Monclar; Philippe Szanyiel; Yannick Souvré; Isabelle Fijalkowski; Referees: Yvan Mainini; Pioneers: Yvonne Santais-Houel; Teams: 2001 Senior French Women's Team: 2001 EuroBasket Women: Gold
2012	Players: Lucienne Velu-Chapillon; René Chocat; Jacqueline Delachet; Roger Haudegand; Paoline Ekambi; Personalities: Jacques Huguet
2013	Players: Ginette Mazel; Stéphane Ostrowski; Personalities: Jean Bayle-Lespitau; Referees: Max Mamie; Pioneers: Emile Frézot
2014	Players: Henry Fields; Cathy Melain; Martine Campi; Michel Rat; Jim Bilba; Personalities: Gérard Bosc; Pioneers: Wladimir Fabrikant
2015	Players: Sandra Le Dréan; Colette Passemard; Michel Le Ray; Yann Bonato; Personalities: Xavier Popelier; Jean-Claude Biojout; Pioneers: Charles Boizard
2016	Players: Françoise Quiblier-Bertal; Jean-Pierre Staelens; André Vacheresse; Freddy Hufnagel; Pioneers: Robert Cohu
2017	Players: Louis Devoti; Danielle Peter; Laurent Sciarra; Lætitia Moussard; Personalities: Jean-Pierre Dusseaulx; Pioneers: Henri Lesmayoux
2018	Players: Laurent Foirest; Frédéric Forte; Geneviève Guinchard; Nathalie Lesdema; Moustapha Sonko; Pioneers: Val Bouryschkine
2019	Players: Audrey Sauret; Didier Gadou; Edwige Lawson; Stéphane Risacher; Personalities: Emile Touzet; Pioneers: Melvin Rideout; Teams: 2009 Senior French Women's team: EuroBasket Women 2009: Gold
2020	Players: Alain Larrouquis; Emmeline Ndongue; Ronny Turiaf; Referees: Jean-Claude Bois; Coaches: Alain Jardel; Pioneers: Marguerite Radideau
2021	Players: Nicole Antibe; Cyril Julian; Anna Kotočová; Ed Murphy; Referees: Chantal Julien; Coaches: Pierre Dao; Pioneers: Michaël Ruzgis
2022	Players: Frédéric Weis; Delaney Rudd; Jacqueline Cator; Personalities: George Eddy; Executives: Jean Donnadieu; Teams: 2012 Senior French Women's Team: 2012 London Summer Olympic Games: Silver; Pioneers: Alice Milliat
2023	Players: Boris Diaw; Laure Savasta; Dominique Leray; Coaches: Jean Galle; Bernard Grosgeorge; Teams: 2013 Senior French Men's Team: EuroBasket 2013: Gold; Pioneers: Justy Specker
2024	Players: Corinne Benintendi; Michel Mensch; Tony Parker; Personalities: Pierre Fosset; Coaches: Božidar Maljković; Pioneers: André Siener
2025	Players: Jérôme Christ; Nathalie Étienne-Bergeaud; Florent Piétrus; Charles Tassin; Referees: Goran Radonjić; Coaches: Michel Gomez; Pioneers: Étienne Onimus
2026	Players: Sandra Dijon; Carole Force; Daniel Ledent; Personalities: Michel Léger; Coaches: Vincent Collet; Valérie Garnier; Pioneers: Jacqueline Biny

== See also ==
- College Basketball Hall of Fame
- Basketball Hall of Fame
  - List of members of the Naismith Memorial Basketball Hall of Fame
  - List of players in the Naismith Memorial Basketball Hall of Fame
  - List of coaches in the Naismith Memorial Basketball Hall of Fame
- FIBA Hall of Fame
  - List of members of the FIBA Hall of Fame
- EuroLeague Hall of Fame
- Spanish Basketball Hall of Fame
- Italian Basketball Hall of Fame
- Greek Basket League Hall of Fame
- VTB United League Hall of Fame
- Finnish Basketball Hall of Fame
- Australian Basketball Hall of Fame
- Philippine Basketball Association Hall of Fame
- Women's Basketball Hall of Fame
