= Philippe Baillet =

French basketball player (1940–2015)

Personal information
- Nationality: French
- Born: 6 October 1940; Bordeaux, France
- Died: 5 January 2015 (aged 74)

Sport
- Sport: Basketball

Philippe Baillet (6 October 1940 – 5 January 2015) was a French basketball player. He competed in the men's tournament at the 1960 Summer Olympics and is the youngest player in the history of the French men's national basketball team.
