= Salah El-Dine Nessim =

Egyptian basketball player

Personal information
- Nationality: Egyptian
- Born: Cairo, Kingdom of Egypt

Sport
- Sport: Basketball
Medal record
Men's basketball
Representing Egypt
EuroBasket
Gold medal – first place	1949 Egypt

Salah El-Dine Nessim (Arabic: صلاح الدين نسيم) was an Egyptian basketball player. He competed in the men's tournament at the 1948 Summer Olympics.
