= Patrick Cham =

French basketball player

Patrick Cham (born 18 May 1959 in Saint-Claude, Guadeloupe) is a French former professional basketball player.

== Professional career ==
Cham was the French 2nd Division French Player's MVP in 1992, while playing with Levallois Sporting Club.

== National team career ==
Cham had 113 caps with the senior French national basketball team, from 1981 to 1989.
