= Éric Beugnot =

French basketball player (born 1955)

Personal information
- Born: 22 March 1955 (age 71) Cliron, France
- Listed height: 6 ft 6.75 in (2.00 m)
- Listed weight: 220 lb (100 kg)

Career information
- Playing career: 1972–1992
- Position: Shooting guard / small forward
- Number: 14

Career history
- 1972–1984: Le Mans
- 1984–1986: AS Monaco
- 1986–1989: ASVEL
- 1989–1992: CRO Lyon

Career highlights
- As player: 2× FIBA European Selection (1981 2×); 3× French League champion (1978, 1979, 1982); 3× French League All-Defensive First Team (1986, 1987, 1988); 5× French All-Star Game (1983, 1984, 1986, 1987, 1988); French 2nd Division champion (1991); French Basketball Hall of Fame (2010)
Medals
Men's basketball
Representing France
Mediterranean Games
Silver medal – second place	1975 Algeria

Éric Beugnot (French: [eʁik bøɲo]; born 22 March 1955) is a French former professional basketball player. Standing at 2.00 m (6' 6 3/4") tall, Beugnot played at the shooting guard and small forward positions.

== Professional career ==
During his pro career, Beugnot played with the French clubs Le Mans, AS Monaco, ASVEL, and CRO Lyon. He won 3 French League championships, in the years 1978, 1979, and 1982.

== National team career ==
Beugnot was a member of the senior French national basketball team. With France, he played in 212 games, from 1975 to 1987, scoring a total of 2,493 points. He played at the 1984 Summer Olympic Games.

He also played at the 1986 FIBA World Championship, at the 1977 EuroBasket, the 1979 EuroBasket, the 1981 EuroBasket, the 1983 EuroBasket, and the 1987 EuroBasket.

== Managerial career ==
After his playing career, Beugnot became the Sports Director of PSG Racing, in 1992, and became the general manager of ASVEL, in 1995.

== Personal life ==
Beugnot's brother, Grég, and his father, Jean-Paul, were also professional basketball players.
