= Jean-Paul Beugnot =

French basketball player (1931–2001)

Personal information
- Born: 25 June 1931 Schiltigheim, France
- Died: 7 February 2001 (aged 69) Montpellier, France
- Listed height: 6 ft 9.5 in (2.07 m)
- Listed weight: 230 lb (104 kg)
- Position: Power forward / center
- Number: 12, 14

Career history

Playing
- Bar-Le-Duc
- Pierrots de Strasbourg
- 1955–1967: Étoile Charleville-Mézières
- Chalons en Champagne

Coaching
- 1956–1958: Étoile Charleville-Mézières

Career highlights
- As player: FIBA's 50 Greatest Players (1991); 2× French League champion (1958, 1960); 2× French Cup winner (1958, 1959); French League Best Scorer (1963); French National Sports Hall of Fame (2013); French Basketball Hall of Fame (2004)

Jean-Paul Beugnot (French: [ʒɑ̃pol bøɲo]; 25 June 1931 – 7 February 2001) was a French professional basketball player and coach. Standing at 2.07 m (6' 9 1/2") tall, Beugnot played at the power forward and center positions. He was named one of FIBA's 50 Greatest Players, in 1991. He was inducted into the French Basketball Hall of Fame in 2004. He was inducted into the French National Sports Hall of Fame in 2013.

== Club career ==
=== Playing career ===
During his playing career, Beugnot played with the French club Étoile Charleville-Mézières (1955–1967). With Étoile Charleville-Mézières, he won two French League championships (1958 and 1960), and two French Cups (1958 and 1959). He was also the Best Scorer of the French League's 1962–63 season.

=== Coaching career ===
Beugnot also worked in Étoile Charleville-Mézières, as a player-coach. He was the club's head coach (1956–1958).

== National team career ==
Beugnot was a member of the senior French national basketball team. With France, he played in 98 games (1951–1961) scoring a total of 1,072 points. He played at the 1952 Summer Olympic Games, at the 1956 Summer Olympic Games, and at the 1960 Summer Olympic Games.

He also played at the 1954 FIBA World Championship, at the EuroBasket 1955, and at the EuroBasket 1961.

== Managerial career ==
After his playing career, Beugnot worked in the French Basketball Federation committee (1976–1985). He was also the federation's Vice-President (1988–1992).

== Personal life ==
Beugnot's sons, Éric and Grég, were also professional basketball players.
