= Claude Bergeaud =

French basketball coach

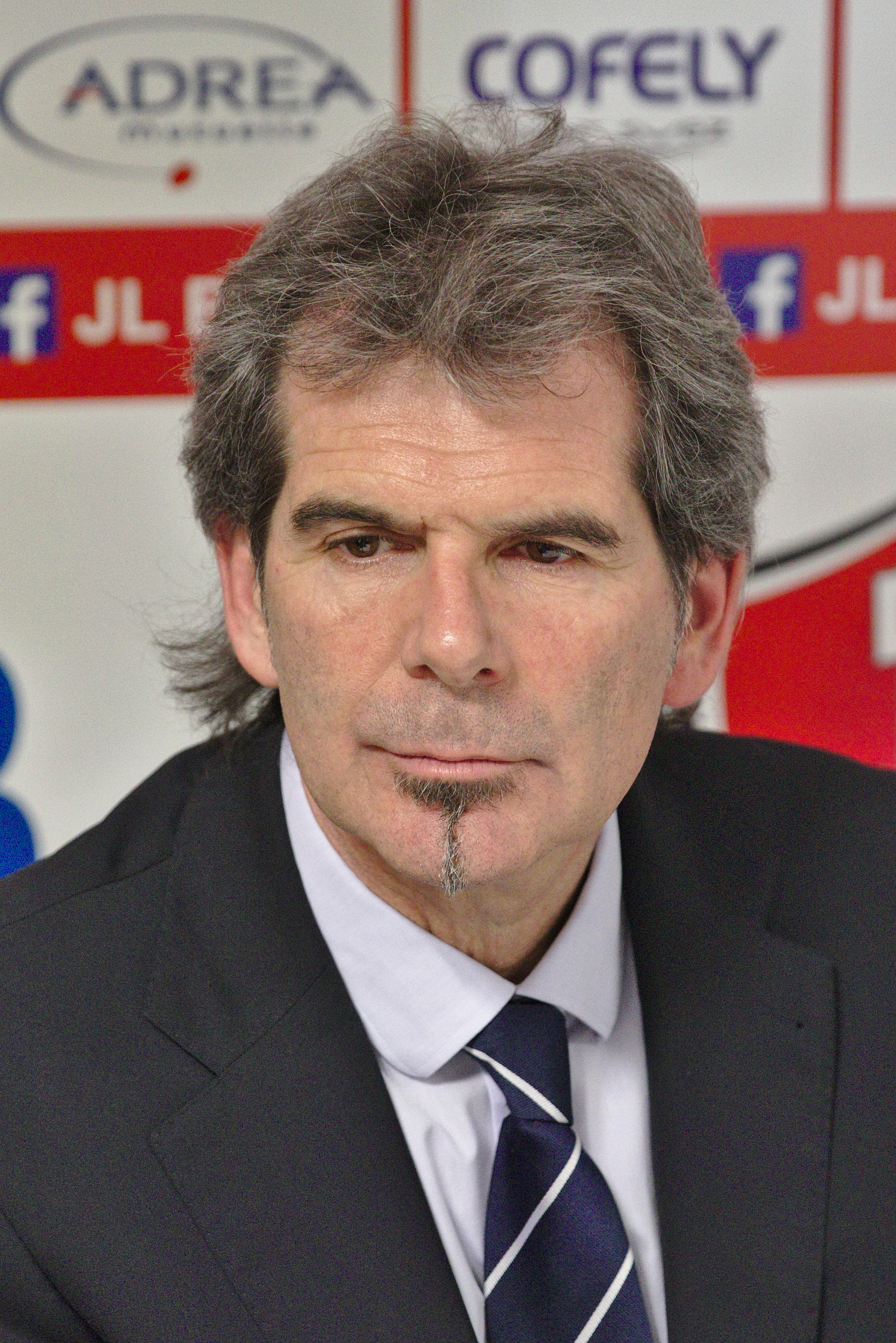

Claude Bergeaud (born 30 April 1960 in Artigat, Ariège, France) is a French basketball coach. From 2008 to 2010, he was the director general of the club Pau-Orthez.

== Clubs ==
- 1996 - end of 1997 : France Pau-Orthez (Pro A) : assistant coach
- end of 1997 - 2002 : France Pau-Orthez (Pro A)
- 2005 - 2006 : France ASVEL Lyon-Villeurbanne (Pro A)

== National team ==
- End of 2003 - end of 2007 : France France national basketball team

== Honours ==
=== National team ===
- World Championships
  - 5th place in 2006 World Championships in Japan
- European Championships
  - Bronze medal at 2005 European Basketball Championships in Belgrade
  - 8th in 2007 European Championships in Spain

=== Clubs ===
With Pau-Orthez, he won :

- French Championships in 1998, 1999, 2001
- Coupe de France in 2002
- Pro A Coach of the Year 1999
- Peigne d'or 1977
