= Albert Tadros =

Egyptian basketball player

Personal information
- Full name: Albert Fahmy Tadros
- Nationality: Egyptian
- Born: 8 August 1914 Cairo, Egypt
- Died: 4 April 1993 (aged 78)

Sport
- Sport: Basketball
Medal record
Men's basketball
Representing Egypt
FIBA EuroBasket
Bronze medal – third place	1947 Prague	Team competition
Gold medal – first place	1949 Cairo	Team competition

Albert Fahmy Tadros (8 August 1914 – 4 April 1993) was an Egyptian basketball player. He competed in the men's tournament at the 1936, 1948 and the 1952 Summer Olympics. He also participated in the Egypt men's national basketball team, winning EuroBasket 1949 and coming third in EuroBasket 1947.
