= Félix Courtinard =

French basketball player

Félix «Féfé» Courtinard (born 12 July 1961 in Saint-Joseph, Martinique) is a French basketball player who played 52 times for the France national basketball team between 1987 and 1993 .
