= Henri Grange =

French basketball player

Personal information
- Born: 14 September 1934 (age 92) Saillans, France
- Listed height: 6 ft 4 in (1.93 m)
- Listed weight: 195 lb (88 kg)

Career information
- Playing career: 1953–1969
- Position: Power forward

Career history
- –1953: BUS Casablanca
- 1954–1969: ASVEL Villeurbanne

Career highlights
- As a player: 2× FIBA European Selection (1965 2×); 7× French League champion (1955–1957, 1964, 1966, 1968, 1969); 3× French Federation Cup winner (1957, 1965, 1967); French Basketball Hall of Fame (2007)
Medals
Men's Basketball
Representing France
FIBA European Olympic Qualifying Tournament
Bronze medal – third place	1964 Switzerland
FIBA EuroBasket
Bronze medal – third place	1959 Turkey

Henri Grange (born 14 September 1934) is a French former basketball player. During his playing career, Grange was nicknamed "The Moroccan". He was inducted into the French Basketball Hall of Fame in 2007.

== Club career ==
Grange began his professional career with ASVEL in 1954. After winning the French League title in 1957, in the following 1958 season, the 24-year-old Grange made his debut in the EuroLeague. In total, he played three seasons in this competition, averaging 9.3 points per game. In 1964/65 season, Grange helped ASVEL to reach the 1/4 finals stage, where they lost to the eventual champions – Real Madrid.

During his club career, as a member of the French basketball club ASVEL Villeurbanne, Grange won seven French League championships, in the years 1955, 1956, 1957, 1964, 1966, 1968, and 1969. He also won three French Federation Cup titles, in the years 1957, 1965, and 1967. On an individual level, Grange was a member of the FIBA European Selection Teams, in 1965.

== National team career ==
Grange was a member of the senior men's French national team, from 1953 to 1969. With France, he had a total of 133 caps. Grange competed with the French teams at the following major FIBA tournaments: the 1954 FIBA World Championship, the 1955 FIBA EuroBasket, the 1956 Melbourne Summer Olympics, the 1957 FIBA EuroBasket, the 1959 FIBA EuroBasket, the 1960 Rome Summer Olympics, the 1961 FIBA EuroBasket, the 1963 FIBA World Championship, and the 1964 FIBA European Olympic Qualifying Tournament.

With France, Grange won bronze medals at the 1959 FIBA EuroBasket, and the 1964 FIBA European Olympic Qualifying Tournament.
