= André Vacheresse =

French basketball player and coach

Personal information
- Born: October 12, 1927 Roanne, France
- Died: June 17, 2000 (aged 72) France

Career information
- Playing career: 1942–1962
- Coaching career: 1977–1980

Career history
- Chorale Roanne Basket

Career highlights
- FIBA EuroBasket silver medal – 1949; FIBA EuroBasket bronze medal – 1951; FIBA EuroBasket bronze medal – 1953; French Basketball Hall of Fame (2016)

André Vacheresse (12 October 1927 in Roanne – 17 June 2000) was a player and coach for the French basketball club Chorale Roanne Basket. He was inducted into the French Basketball Hall of Fame in 2016.

== Biography ==
Vacheresse played for Chorale Roanne Basket from 1942 to 1962, and was the club's manager from 1977 to 1978 and its coach from 1978 to 1980. He was also a regular member of the France team with 70 caps and three titles as UFOLEP Champion of France. He won three medals at the FIBA EuroBasket: silver in Cairo 1949, and bronze in Paris 1951 and Moscow 1953. Vacheresse took part in the 1950 FIBA World Cup, in Buenos Aires, as captain with Maurice Marcelot, and finished in sixth place, and at the 1952 Helsinki Summer Olympics, where France finished in eighth place.

He was later involved with a number of basketball stadiums, particularly Joyeuse Boule in Roanne, of which he was président.

Vacheresse died in July 2000. The town of Roanne named a new sports hall with a capacity of 3,200 seats after him on 20 January 2001.

== Club ==
Player

- 1942 - 1962: (France) Chorale Roanne Basket (Nationale 1)

Coach

- 1977 - 1980: (France) Chorale Roanne Basket (Nationale 1)

== Personal honours ==
In 2000, he won the Robert Busnel medal.
