= Fernand Guillou =

French basketball player

- Born: Fernand Guillou; 6 January 1926; Montoire-sur-le-Loir, France
- Died: 7 October 2009 (aged 83)
- Occupation: Basketball player

Olympic medal record

Representing France

Men's basketball
Silver medal – second place	1948 London	Team competition

European Championships
Silver medal – second place	1949 Egypt	Team competition

Fernand Guillou (6 January 1926 – 7 October 2009) was a French basketball player who competed in the 1948 Summer Olympics. He was part of the French basketball team, which won the silver medal.
