= Grégor Beugnot =

French basketball player and coach

Personal information
- Born: October 7, 1957 (age 69) Cliron, France
- Listed height: 6 ft 4 in (1.93 m)
- Listed weight: 190 lb (86 kg)
- Position: Point guard

Career history

Playing
- 1976–1977: Reims
- 1977–1978: Asnières
- 1978–1984: SCM Le Mans
- 1984–1989: CSP Limoges
- 1989–1990: Paris Racing Basket

Coaching
- 1989–1992: Paris Racing Basket
- 1992–2001: Asvel Basket
- 2002–2003: Varese
- 2003–2013: Élan Chalon-sur-Saône
- 2013–2015: Paris-Levallois Basket
- 2016: JL Bourg-en-Bresse
- 2016: SLUC Nancy

Career highlights
- As player: FIBA Saporta Cup champion (1988); 5× French League champion (1979, 1982, 1985, 1988, 1989); French Leaders Cup winner (1988); French Cup winner (1985); 3× French League All-Star Game (1988, 1989, 1990); As a head coach: French League champion (2012); French Leaders Cup winner (2012); 5× French Cup winner (1996, 1997, 2001, 2011, 2012); 4× French League Best Coach (1996, 1997, 1998, 2012)

Grégor "Grég" Beugnot (French: [ɡʁeɡɔʁ bøɲo]; born October 7, 1957 in Cliron, France) is a former French professional basketball player and a current professional coach. During his playing career, he played at the point guard position.

== Playing career ==
=== Club career ===
In his professional playing career, Beugnot played with the following clubs: Champagne Châlons Reims Basket, Asnières Basketball, Sporting Club Moderne Le Mans, Cercle Saint-Pierre de Limoges, and Paris Racing Basket.

=== National team career ===
Beugnot was a member of the senior French national basketball team. With France, he played at the 1984 Summer Olympic Games, and at the 1989 EuroBasket.

== Coaching career ==
During his professional coaching career, Beugnot has been the head coach of some of the following clubs: Paris Racing Basket, Asvel Lyon-Villeurbanne, Pallacanestro Varese, and Élan Sportif Chalonnais.

== Awards and accomplishments ==
=== Playing career ===
- 5× French League Champion: (1979, 1982, 1985, 1988, 1989)
- French Federation Cup Winner: (1985)
- 3× French League All-Star Game (1988, 1989, 1990)
- French Leaders Cup Winner: (1988)
- FIBA Saporta Cup Champion: (1988)

=== Coaching career ===
- 5× French Federation Cup Winner: (1996, 1997, 2001, 2011, 2012)
- 4× French League Best Coach: (1996, 1997, 1998, 2012)
- French Leaders Cup Winner: (2012)
- French League Champion: (2012)

== Personal life ==
Beugnot's father, Jean-Paul, and his brother, Éric, were also professional basketball players.
