= Mohamedi Soliman =

Egyptian basketball player

Personal information
- Full name: Mohamed Mahmoud Soliman
- Nationality: Egyptian

Sport
- Sport: Basketball
Medal record
Men's basketball
Representing Egypt
EuroBasket
Gold medal – first place	1949 Egypt

Mohamedi Soliman (Arabic: محمدي سليمان; also known as Mohamed Mahmoud Soliman) was an Egyptian basketball player. He competed in the men's tournament at the 1948 Summer Olympics.
