= Louis Bertorelle =

French basketball player (1932–2012)

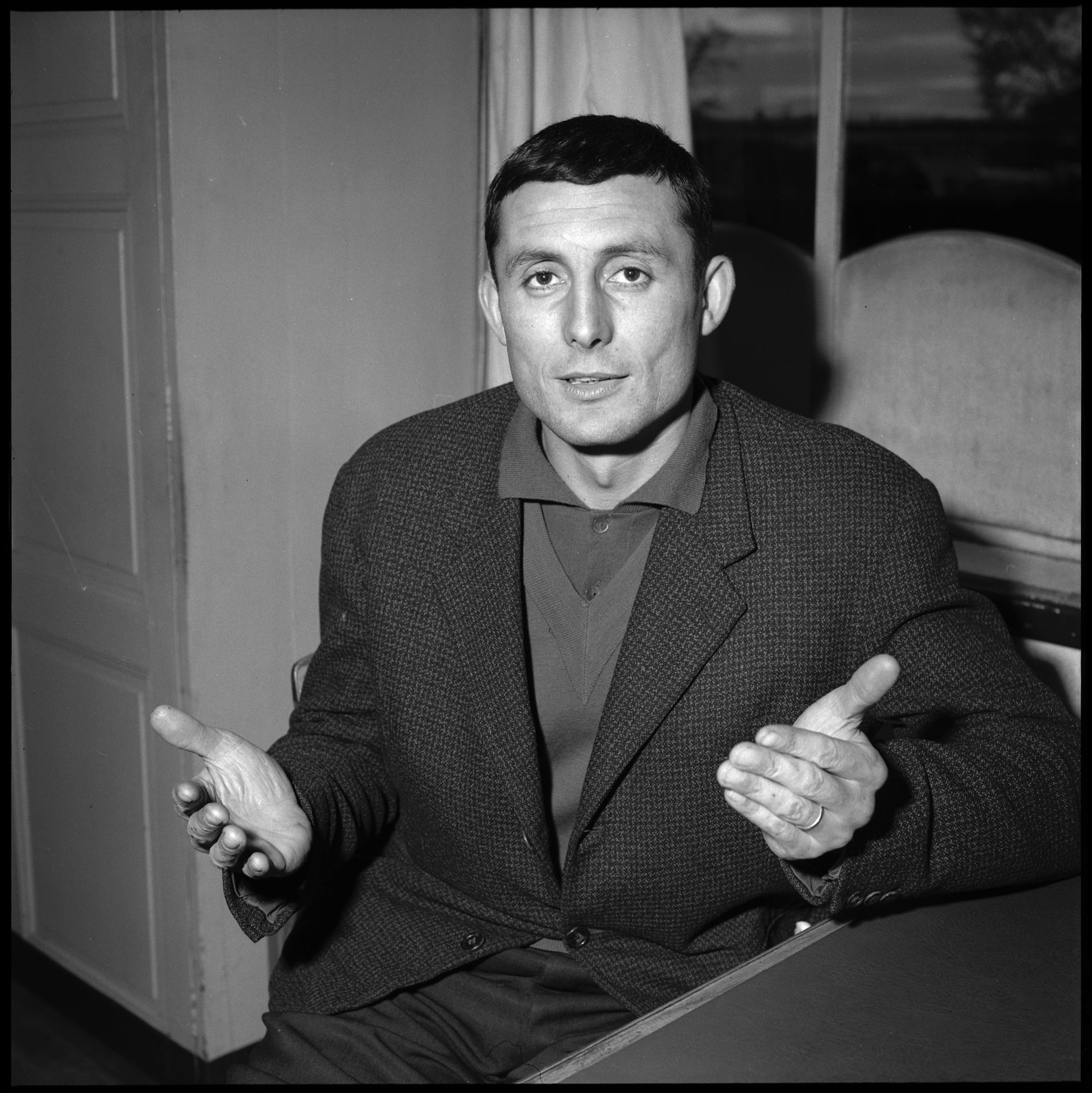

Personal information
- Born: 5 August 1932 Saint-Juéry, Tarn, France
- Died: 27 February 2012 (aged 79) Seilh, Haute-Garonne, France
- Listed height: 6 ft 2.75 in (1.90 m)
- Listed weight: 190 lb (86 kg)

Career information
- Playing career: 1948–1971
- Position: Small forward

Career history
- 1948–1951: Saint-Juéry Olympique
- 1951–1956: JS Caraman
- 1956–1957: CEP Lorient
- 1957–1958: JS Caraman
- 1958–1971: RCM Toulouse

Career highlights
- French Basketball Hall of Fame (2008)

Louis Bertorelle (5 August 1932 – 27 February 2012) was a French basketball player. He was inducted into the French Basketball Hall of Fame, in 2008.

== National team career ==
Bertorelle played at the 1960 Summer Olympic Games, with the senior French national basketball team.
