= Jean-Claude Lefebvre (basketball) =

French basketball player (1937–1999)

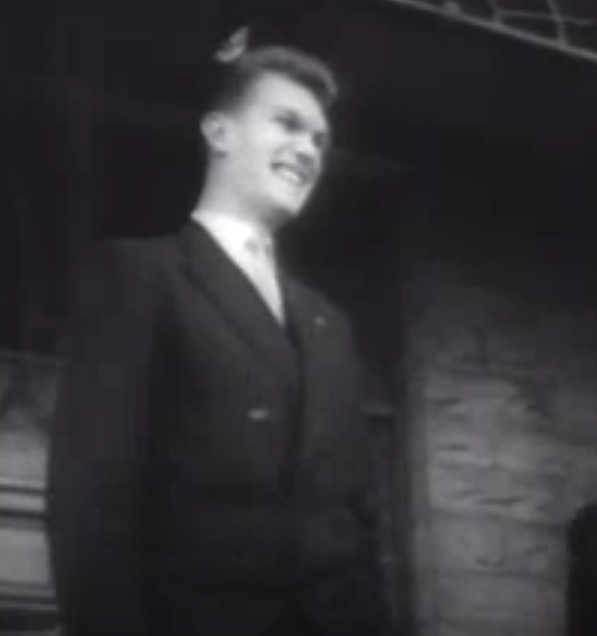
- Jean-Claude Lefebvre in 1957.

Personal information
- Born: 14 June 1937 Épiais-lès-Louvres, France
- Died: 13 August 1999 (aged 62) Épiais-lès-Louvres, France
- Listed height: 218 cm (7 ft 2 in)
- Listed weight: 285 lb (129 kg)

Career information
- College: Gonzaga (1957–1959)
- NBA draft: 1960: 9th round, 64th overall pick
- Drafted by: Minneapolis Lakers
- Position: Center

Career history
- 1956–1957: Chorale de Roanne
- 1960–1961: Racing CF
- 1961–1964: Olympique d'Antibes
- 1964–1965: Étoile de Charleville-Mézières
- Stats at Basketball Reference
Medals
Men's basketball
Representing France
EuroBasket
Bronze medal – third place	1959 Turkey

Jean-Claude Lefebvre (14 June 1937 – 13 August 1999) was a French basketball player who was a member of the French national basketball team. He played two seasons of college basketball in the United States for Gonzaga University where he set the schools then single game scoring record with 50 points in 1958.

Lefebvre was drafted by the Minneapolis Lakers with the 64th pick in the 1960 NBA draft, becoming the first French player to be drafted to the National Basketball Association.

== National team career ==
Lefebvre played 57 games for the French national basketball team from 1967 to 1963. He participated in the 1963 FIBA World Championship and the European Basketball Championship in 1957, 1959, were France won bronze, and 1963.

== Personal life ==
Lefebvre's father was 199 cm and his mother was 191 cm.
