= Pierre Thiolon =

French basketball player

Olympic medal record

Men's basketball
Silver medal – second place	1948 London	Team competition

European Championships
Bronze medal – third place	1951 France	Team competition

Pierre Thiolon (17 January 1927 – 14 April 2014) was a French basketball player who competed in the 1948 Summer Olympics. He was part of the French basketball team, which won the silver medal.
