= Maurice Girardot =

French basketball player (1921–2020)

Personal information
- Born: 22 December 1921
- Died: 8 February 2020 (aged 98)
Medal record
Men's basketball
Silver medal – second place	1948 London	Team competition

Maurice Girardot (French: [mɔʁis ʒiʁaʁdo]; 22 December 1921 – 8 February 2020) was a French basketball player. He competed in the 1948 Summer Olympics. Girardot was part of the French basketball team, which won the silver medal.

Girardot died on 8 February 2020, at the age of 98.
