= Maurice Desaymonnet =

French basketball player

- Born: Maurice Desaymonnet; 24 June 1921; Paris, France
- Died: 4 November 2015 (aged 94)
- Occupation: Basketball player

Olympic medal record

Representing France

Men's basketball
| Silver medal – second place | 1948 London | Team competition |

European Championships
| Silver medal – second place | 1949 Egypt | Team competition |

Maurice Desaymonnet (24 June 1921 – 4 November 2015) was a French basketball player who competed in the 1948 Summer Olympics. He was part of the French basketball team, which won the silver medal. Desaymonnet died in November 2015 at the age of 94.
