= Richard Dacoury =

French basketball player

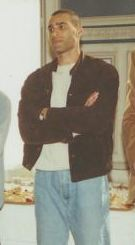
- Richard Dacoury

Personal information
- Born: 6 July 1959 (age 67) Abidjan, Ivory Coast
- Listed height: 6 ft 4.75 in (1.95 m)
- Listed weight: 200 lb (91 kg)

Career information
- Playing career: 1976–1998
- Position: Shooting guard / small forward

Career history
- 1976–1978: Lyon
- 1978–1996: Limoges
- 1996–1998: Racing Paris

Career highlights
- EuroLeague champion (1993); 3× FIBA European Selection Team (1987 2×, 1991); FIBA EuroStar (1996); FIBA Saporta Cup champion (1988); 2× FIBA Korac Cup champion (1982, 1983); 101 Greats of European Basketball (2018); 9× French League champion (1983, 1984, 1985, 1988, 1989, 1990, 1993, 1994, 1997); 7× French Federation Cup winner (1982, 1983, 1985, 1988, 1990, 1994, 1995); French League French Player's MVP (1985); 9× French League Best Defender (1987–1995); No.7 jersey retired by Limoges (2010); French Basketball Hall of Fame (2005); French National Sports Hall of Fame (2011)

Richard Dacoury (born 6 July 1959 in Abidjan, Ivory Coast) is a former French professional basketball player. He retired in 1998, as the basketball player who won the most French League titles during his career, with 9. Dacoury is considered to be one the greatest players in French basketball history. He had his jersey number 7 retired by Limoges, in October 2010.

== Professional career ==
Dacoury led the French team of Limoges to several titles, including the 1993 FIBA European League (EuroLeague), which is widely regarded as one of the greatest upsets in European-wide club basketball history. He was a three-time member of the FIBA European Selection Team, in 1987, and twice in 1991.

== National team career ==
Dacoury played with the senior French national team (1981–1992). With France, he played in a total of 160 games, and scored a total of 2,230 points. He played in 5 FIBA EuroBaskets, one FIBA World Cup, and one Summer Olympics.

He played at the following tournaments: the 1981 FIBA EuroBasket (Prague, Czechoslovakia), the 1983 FIBA EuroBasket (Nantes, France), the 1984 Summer Olympic Games (Los Angeles, United States), the 1986 FIBA World Championship (Zaragoza, Spain), the 1987 FIBA EuroBasket (Athens, Greece), the 1989 FIBA EuroBasket (Zagreb, Yugoslavia), and the 1991 FIBA EuroBasket (Rome, Italy).

== Awards and accomplishments ==
=== Club honours ===
- 1982 French Cup Winner (Limoges)
- 1982 FIBA Korać Cup Champion (Limoges)
- 1983 French League Champion (Limoges)
- 1983 French Cup Winner (Limoges)
- 1983 FIBA Korać Cup Champion (Limoges)
- 1984 French League Champion (Limoges)
- 1985 French League Champion (Limoges)
- 1985 French Cup Winner (Limoges)
- 1988 French League Champion (Limoges)
- 1988 French Cup Winner (Limoges)
- 1988 FIBA European Cup Winners' Cup Champion (Limoges)
- 1989 French League Champion (Limoges)
- 1990 French League Champion (Limoges)
- 1990 French Cup Winner (Limoges)
- 1993 FIBA European League (EuroLeague) (Limoges)
- 1993 French League Champion (Limoges)
- 1993 French Cup Winner (Limoges)
- 1994 French League Champion (Limoges)
- 1994 French Cup Winner (Limoges)
- 1997 French League Champion (PSG Racing)
