= René Chocat =

French basketball player (1920–2000)

Personal information
- Born: 28 November 1920 Santranges, France
- Died: 18 July 2000 (aged 79) Montpellier, France
- Listed height: 6 ft 1.25 in (1.86 m)
- Position: Small forward

Career history
- Issy
- Avia Club
- UA Marseille
- Olympique de Marseille
- PTT Montpellier

Career highlights
- French League champion (1948); Order of Sports Merit (France) (1999); French Basketball Hall of Fame (2012)
Medals
Representing France
Men's basketball
Olympics
Silver medal – second place	1948 London
EuroBasket
Silver medal – second place	1949 Egypt
Bronze medal – third place	1951 France
Bronze medal – third place	1953 USSR

René Chocat (28 November 1920 – 18 July 2000) was a French basketball player. He was inducted into the French Basketball Hall of Fame, in 2012.

== National team career ==
Chocat played the 1948 Summer Olympics, and at the 1952 Summer Olympics.

At the London 1948 Summer Olympic Games, he was a part of the senior French national team that won the silver medal. Four years later, at the 1952 Helsinki Summer Olympic Games, he was a member of the French team, which finished in eighth place.
