= Bernard Mayeur =

French basketball player

Personal information
- Nationality: French
- Born: 23 February 1938; Paris, France
- Died: 11 January 2004 (aged 65); Bagnolet, France

Sport
- Sport: Basketball

Bernard Eugène Mayeur (23 February 1938 – 11 January 2004) was a French basketball player. He competed in the men's tournament at the 1960 Summer Olympics.
