= Jean Degros =

French basketball player

Personal information
- Nationality: French
- Born: 18 November 1939 (age 85); Pecquencourt, France

Sport
- Sport: Basketball

Jean Degros (born 18 November 1939) is a French basketball player. He competed in the men's tournament at the 1960 Summer Olympics. He was inducted into the French Basketball Hall of Fame in 2007.
