= Robert Cohu =

French basketball player (1911–2011)

Personal information
- Nationality: French
- Born: 20 August 1911; Paris, France
- Died: 21 January 2011 (aged 99); Paris, France

Sport
- Sport: Basketball

Robert Cohu (20 August 1911 – 21 January 2011) was a French basketball player. He competed in the men's tournament at the 1936 Summer Olympics. He was inducted into the French Basketball Hall of Fame in 2016.
