= Robert Monclar =

French basketball player (1930–2012)

Personal information
- Nationality: French
- Born: 13 August 1930; Servian, France
- Died: 4 December 2012 (aged 82); Montagnac, France

Sport
- Sport: Basketball

Robert Monclar (13 August 1930 – 4 December 2012) was a French basketball player. He competed in the men's tournament at the 1952 Summer Olympics, the 1956 Summer Olympics and the 1960 Summer Olympics. He was inducted into the French Basketball Hall of Fame in 2006.
