= Pierre Boël =

French basketball player (1911–1968)

Personal information
- Nationality: French
- Born: 4 July 1911; Croix, France
- Died: 25 May 1968 (aged 56)

Sport
- Sport: Basketball

Pierre Boël (4 July 1911 – 25 May 1968) was a French basketball player. He competed in the men's tournament at the 1936 Summer Olympics.
