= Roger Antoine =

French basketball player (1929–2003)

Personal information
- Nationality: French
- Born: 28 June 1929; Bamako, Mali
- Died: 11 August 2003 (aged 74); Saclay, France

Sport
- Sport: Basketball

Roger Antoine (28 June 1929 – 11 August 2003) was a French basketball player. He competed in the men's tournament at the 1956 Summer Olympics and the 1960 Summer Olympics. He was inducted into the French Basketball Hall of Fame in 2004. He was inducted into the French National Sports Hall of Fame in 2008.
