= André Schlupp =

French basketball player

Personal information
- Nationality: French
- Born: 14 January 1930; Strasbourg, France
- Died: 19 May 2008 (aged 78); Mulhouse, France

Sport
- Sport: Basketball

André Paul Schlupp (14 January 1930 – 19 May 2008) was a French basketball player. He competed in the men's tournament at the 1956 Summer Olympics.
