= Roger Veyron =

French basketball player

Personal information
- Nationality: French
- Born: 15 June 1933 (age 91)

Sport
- Sport: Basketball

Roger Veyron (born 15 June 1933) is a French basketball player. He competed in the men's tournament at the 1956 Summer Olympics.
