= Jérôme Christ =

French basketball player (1938–2023)

Personal information
- Nationality: French
- Born: 4 April 1938 Illkirch-Graffenstaden, France
- Died: 26 October 2023 (aged 85) Strasbourg, France

Sport
- Sport: Basketball

Jérôme Christ (4 April 1938 – 26 October 2023) was a French basketball player. He competed in the men's tournament at the 1960 Summer Olympics. Christ died in Strasbourg on 26 October 2023, at the age of 85.

== Biography ==
Jérôme Christ played for the France men's national basketball team from 1957 to 1964, competing in two European Championships (in 1959 and 1961) and the 1960 Summer Olympics.

In 2003, he became president of the professional division of SIG Strasbourg Illkirch-Graffenstaden Basket, which won the French championship in 2005.

Jérôme Christ passed away on October 26, 2023, at the age of 85.
