= Max Dorigo =

French basketball player

Personal information
- Nationality: French
- Born: 27 September 1936 (age 89) Paris, France

Sport
- Sport: Basketball

Maxime Dorigo (born 27 September 1936) is a French basketball player. He competed in the men's tournament at the 1960 Summer Olympics. He was inducted into the French Basketball Hall of Fame in 2004. He was inducted into the French National Sports Hall of Fame in 2011.
