= Christian Baltzer =

French basketball player (born 1936)

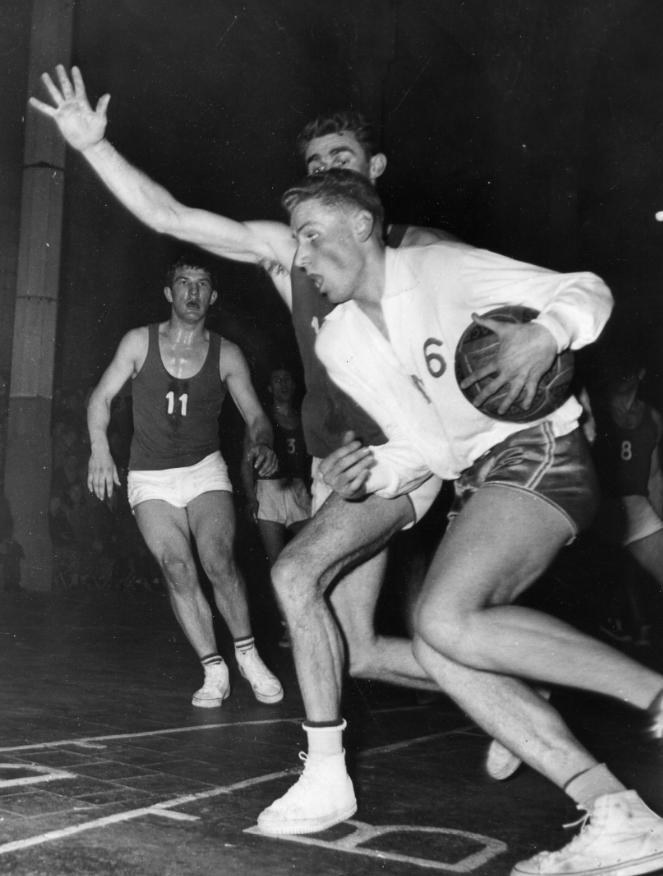

Personal information
- Nationality: French
- Born: 5 July 1936 (age 90) Mulhouse, France

Sport
- Sport: Basketball

Christian Baltzer (born 5 July 1936) is a French basketball player. He competed in the men's tournament at the 1956 Summer Olympics and the 1960 Summer Olympics. He was inducted into the French Basketball Hall of Fame in 2004.
