= Maurice Buffière =

French basketball player (1934–2021)

Personal information
- Nationality: French
- Born: 6 March 1934
- Died: 28 June 2021 (aged 87)

Sport
- Sport: Basketball

Maurice Buffière (6 March 1934 – 28 June 2021) was a French basketball player. He competed in the men's tournament at the 1956 Summer Olympics.
