= Jacques Monclar =

French basketball player (born 1957)

Personal information
- Born: 3 March 1957 (age 69) Neuilly-sur-Seine, France

Jacques Monclar (born 3 March 1957) is a French basketball player. He competed in the men's tournament at the 1984 Summer Olympics. He was inducted into the French Basketball Hall of Fame in 2011.

== Ivory Coast national team ==
In 2007, he was head coach for Ivory Coast's national team.
