= Robert Guillin =

French basketball player

Personal information
- Nationality: French
- Born: 14 February 1926
- Died: 25 November 2013 (aged 87)

Sport
- Sport: Basketball

Robert Guillin (14 February 1926 – 25 November 2013) was a French basketball player. He competed in the men's tournament at the 1952 Summer Olympics.
