= Fernand Prudhomme =

French basketball player

Personal information
- Nationality: French
- Born: 3 July 1916 Paris, France
- Died: 29 April 1993 (aged 76)

Sport
- Sport: Basketball

Fernand Maurice Prudhomme (3 July 1916 – 29 April 1993) was a French basketball player. He competed in the men's tournament at the 1936 Summer Olympics.
