= Roger Haudegand =

French basketball player

Personal information
- Nationality: French
- Born: 20 February 1932; Marly, France
- Died: 19 May 2017 (aged 85); Aix-en-Provence, France

Sport
- Sport: Basketball

Roger Haudegand (20 February 1932 – 19 May 2017) was a French basketball player. He competed in the men's tournament at the 1952 Summer Olympics and the 1956 Summer Olympics. He was inducted into the French Basketball Hall of Fame in 2012.
