= Jean-Luc Deganis =

French basketball player

Personal information
- Born: 10 March 1959 (age 67) Moyeuvre-Grande, France

Jean-Luc Deganis (born 10 March 1959) is a French basketball player. He competed in the men's tournament at the 1984 Summer Olympics.
