= Jean-Michel Sénégal =

French basketball player

Personal information
- Nationality: French
- Born: 5 June 1953 (age 71); Lyon, France

Sport
- Sport: Basketball

Jean-Michel Sénégal (born 5 June 1953) is a French basketball player. He competed in the men's tournament at the 1984 Summer Olympics. He was inducted into the French Basketball Hall of Fame in 2008.
