= Yves Gominon =

French basketball player

Personal information
- Nationality: French
- Born: 5 July 1933
- Died: 28 March 2016 (aged 82)

Sport
- Sport: Basketball

Yves Gominon (5 July 1933 – 28 March 2016) was a French basketball player. He competed in the men's tournament at the 1956 Summer Olympics.
