= Henri Villecourt =

French basketball player

Personal information
- Nationality: French
- Born: 19 March 1938 (age 87); Charlieu, France

Sport
- Sport: Basketball

Henri Villecourt (born 19 March 1938) is a French basketball player. He competed in the men's tournament at the 1960 Summer Olympics.
