= Étienne Rolland =

French basketball player

Personal information
- Nationality: French
- Born: 31 August 1912 Rue, France
- Died: 12 August 2003 (aged 90) Le Perreux-sur-Marne, France

Sport
- Sport: Basketball

Étienne Rolland (31 August 1912 – 12 August 2003) was a French basketball player. He competed in the men's tournament at the 1936 Summer Olympics. He was inducted into the French Basketball Hall of Fame in 2007.
