= Henri Rey =

French basketball player

Personal information
- Nationality: French
- Born: 27 June 1932 Lyon
- Died: 12 February 2016 (aged 83) Caluire-et-Cuire

Sport
- Sport: Basketball

Henri Rey (27 June 1932 – 12 February 2016) was a French basketball player. He competed in the men's tournament at the 1956 Summer Olympics.
