= Bernard Planque =

French basketball player (1932–2016)

Personal information
- Nationality: French
- Born: 13 January 1932; Villeneuve-le-Roi, Val-de-Marne, France
- Died: 6 September 2016 (aged 84)

Sport
- Sport: Basketball

Bernard Planque (13 January 1932 – 6 September 2016) was a French basketball player. He competed in the men's tournament at the 1952 Summer Olympics.
