= Jean-Pierre Salignon =

French basketball player

Personal information
- Nationality: French
- Born: 1 January 1928; Chaabet El Ham, Algeria
- Died: 9 March 2012 (aged 84); Marseilles, France

Sport
- Sport: Basketball

Jean-Pierre Salignon (1 January 1928 – 9 March 2012) was a French basketball player. He competed in the men's tournament at the 1952 Summer Olympics.
