= Jean Perniceni =

French basketball player and coach

Personal information
- Born: 5 April 1930 Bagnolet, France
- Died: 9 June 2010 (aged 80) Paris, France

Career information
- Playing career: 1947–1960
- Position: Shooting guard / small forward
- Coaching career: 1958–1967

Career history

Playing
- 1947–1948: Avia Club
- 1948–1950: AS Monaco
- 1950–1952: Stade Malherbe Caennais
- 1952–1954: RC de France
- 1954–1955: AS Monaco
- 1955–1957: Stade Malherbe Caennais
- 1957–1960: Charleville-Mézières

Coaching
- 1958–1967: Charleville-Mézières

Career highlights
- As player: 4× French League champion (1953, 1954, 1958, 1960); 2× French Federation Cup winner (1958, 1959); French Basketball Hall of Fame (2009)
Medals
Representing France
Men's basketball
EuroBasket
Silver medal – second place	1949 Cairo
Bronze medal – third place	1951 Paris
Bronze medal – third place	1953 Moscow

Jean Perniceni was a French professional basketball player and coach. Jean Perniceni was born in Bagnolet, Seine-Saint-Denis. He played as a shooting guard-small forward (swingman). He was inducted into the French Basketball Hall of Fame, in 2009.

== Club playing career ==
Perniceni played with various French clubs, from 1947 to 1960. He won 4 French League championships (1953, 1954, 1958, 1960), and two French Cups (1958, 1959). Between those, he played for Racing Club de France from 1953 to 1954 as well as AS Monaco Basket and Caen Basket Calvados. In 1952 he participated in Helsinki Summer Olympics.

== Club coaching career ==
In 1958, Perniceni became the head coach of Charleville-Mézières. He retired in 1967.

== Death ==
Perniceni died in June 2010.
