= Louis Devoti =

French basketball player (1926–2020)

Personal information
- Nationality: French
- Born: 10 August 1926; Auboué, France ¦ family alive = Amily Marcelle Devoti
- Died: 6 August 2020 (aged 93); Joeuf, France

Sport
- Sport: Basketball

Louis Devoti (10 August 1926 – 6 August 2020) was a French basketball player. He competed in the men's tournament at the 1952 Summer Olympics. He was inducted into the French Basketball Hall of Fame in 2017.
