= Jacques Dessemme =

French basketball player (1925–2019)

Personal information
- Nationality: French
- Born: 16 September 1925; Bellegarde-sur-Valserine, France
- Died: 23 March 2019 (aged 93); Saint-Julien-en-Genevois, France

Sport
- Sport: Basketball

Jacques Dessemme (16 September 1925 – 23 March 2019) was a French basketball player. He competed in the men's tournament at the 1952 Summer Olympics. He was inducted into the French Basketball Hall of Fame in 2005.
