= Rodrigue Beaubois =

French basketball player (born 1988)

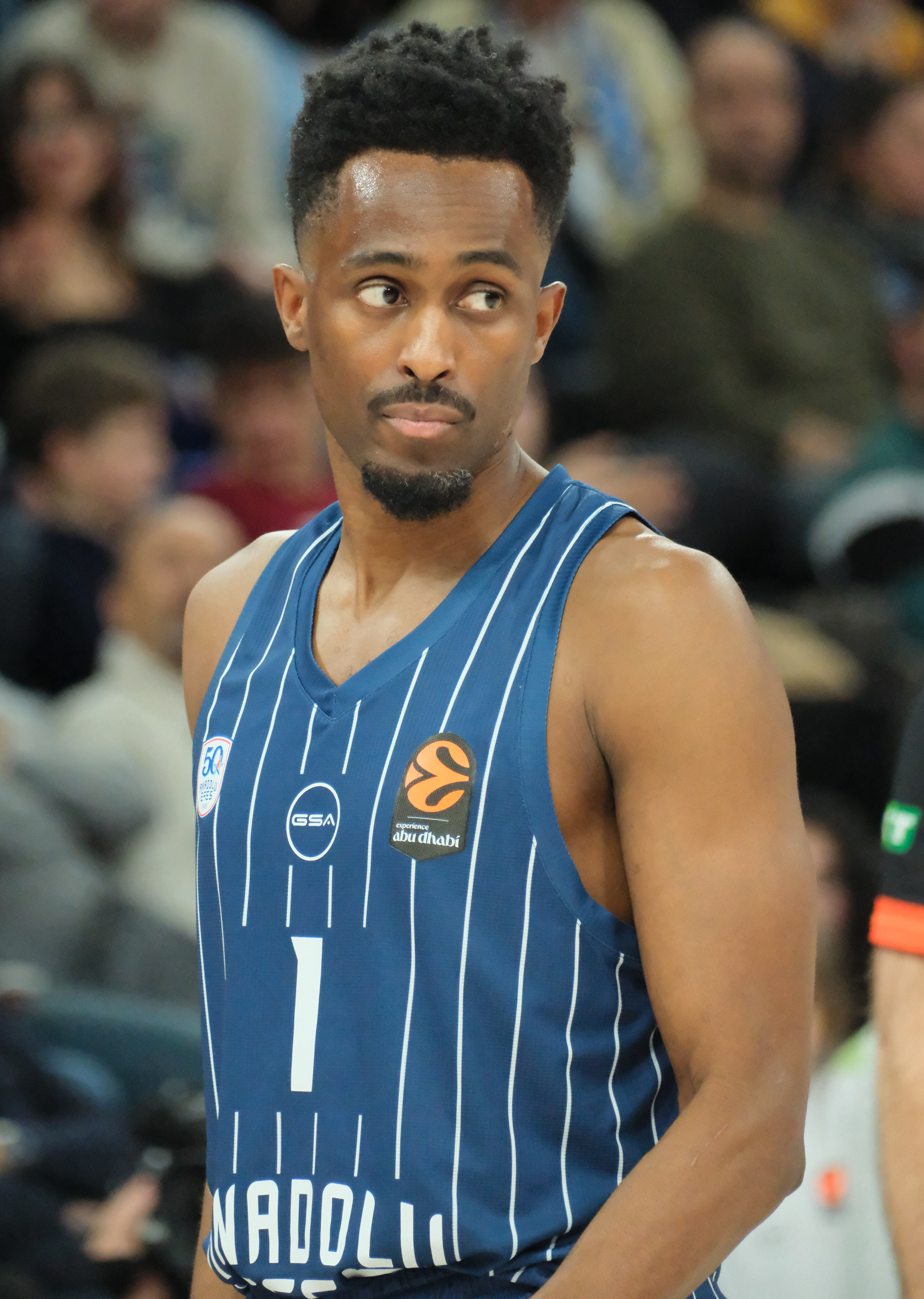
- Beaubois with Anadolu Efes in 2026

Free Agent
- Position: Shooting guard / point guard

Personal information
- Born: 24 February 1988 (age 38) Pointe-à-Pitre, Guadeloupe
- Listed height: 1.9 m (6 ft 3 in)
- Listed weight: 84 kg (185 lb)

Career information
- NBA draft: 2009: 1st round, 25th overall pick
- Drafted by: Oklahoma City Thunder
- Playing career: 2006–present

Career history
- 2006–2009: Cholet
- 2009–2013: Dallas Mavericks
- 2014: Charleroi
- 2014–2015: Le Mans
- 2015–2016: Strasbourg
- 2016–2018: Baskonia
- 2018–2026: Anadolu Efes

Career highlights
- NBA champion (2011); Turkish Cup winner (2022); 2× EuroLeague champion (2021, 2022); EuroLeague 50–40–90 club (2021); 3× Turkish League champion (2019, 2021, 2023); Turkish League Finals MVP (2021); 4× Turkish Presidential Cup winner (2018, 2019, 2022, 2024); Pro A Most Improved Player (2009); Match des Champions MVP (2015); Match des Champions winner (2015)
- Stats at NBA.com
- Stats at Basketball Reference

Rodrigue Gabriel "Roddy" Beaubois (French pronunciation: [ʁɑdʁiɡ bobwɑ]; born 24 February 1988) is a French professional basketball player who last played for Anadolu Efes of the Turkish Basketbol Süper Ligi (BSL) and the EuroLeague.

== Early life ==
Beaubois was discovered by NBA player Mickaël Piétrus at an open basketball camp in his native home island, Guadeloupe, located in the French West Indies. He made his professional debut in the 2006–07 season with Cholet Basket in the French Pro A League, where he was teammates with future Toronto Raptors guard Nando de Colo.

== Professional career ==
=== Cholet Basket (2006–2009) ===
In his first season with Cholet Basket, Beaubois played with the Cholet Espoirs, the junior team, where he averaged 10.8 points, 2.1 rebounds, 2.3 assists and 18.1 minutes per game. Beaubois spent the majority of the 2006–07 season with the Espoirs, averaging 13.2 points, 4.0 rebounds and 3.4 assists. He saw action in four French Pro A League games, in which he never scored. He also played 3 minutes in the 2007 Pro A playoffs, losing in the quarterfinals to Roanne.

Beaubois missed the first few weeks of the 2007–08 season due to a fractured bone in his left hand. He would play in the French Pro A League the whole season, averaging 5.5 points, 1.8 rebounds, and 1.4 assists in 15.1 minutes per game. He scored in double figures five times, recording a season high of 15 points against ASVEL Basket. Beaubois would lose in the quarterfinals again this time to Le Mans. Cholet Basket competed in the 2007–08 FIBA EuroChallenge. The EuroChallenge is the third tier in the European professional club basketball pyramid. Beaubois played in 3 games and averaged 4.7 points and 1 rebound and assists in 18.7 minutes. Cholet lost in the group stage of the competition going 2–4.

In his 29 games of the 2008–09 season, Beaubois averaged 10 points, 2.5 rebounds, 2.3 assists and 1.1 steals per game in 22.3 minutes. He improved as the season progressed. Notably, he recorded a career high 31 points, eight assists and five steals against Roanne. Cholet Basket did not qualify for the 2009 playoffs, but they participated in the second tier of the European professional club basketball pyramid. After losing to ASK Riga in the Eurocup preliminary rounds, Cholet competed again in the EuroChallenge. During the 2008–09 EuroChallenge, Beaubois nearly had a triple double, scoring 16 points, grabbing nine rebounds, and assisting eight times against Fribourg Olympic. Cholet would advance to the EuroChallenge Final Four, only to lose to Virtus Bologna.

=== Dallas Mavericks (2009–2013) ===
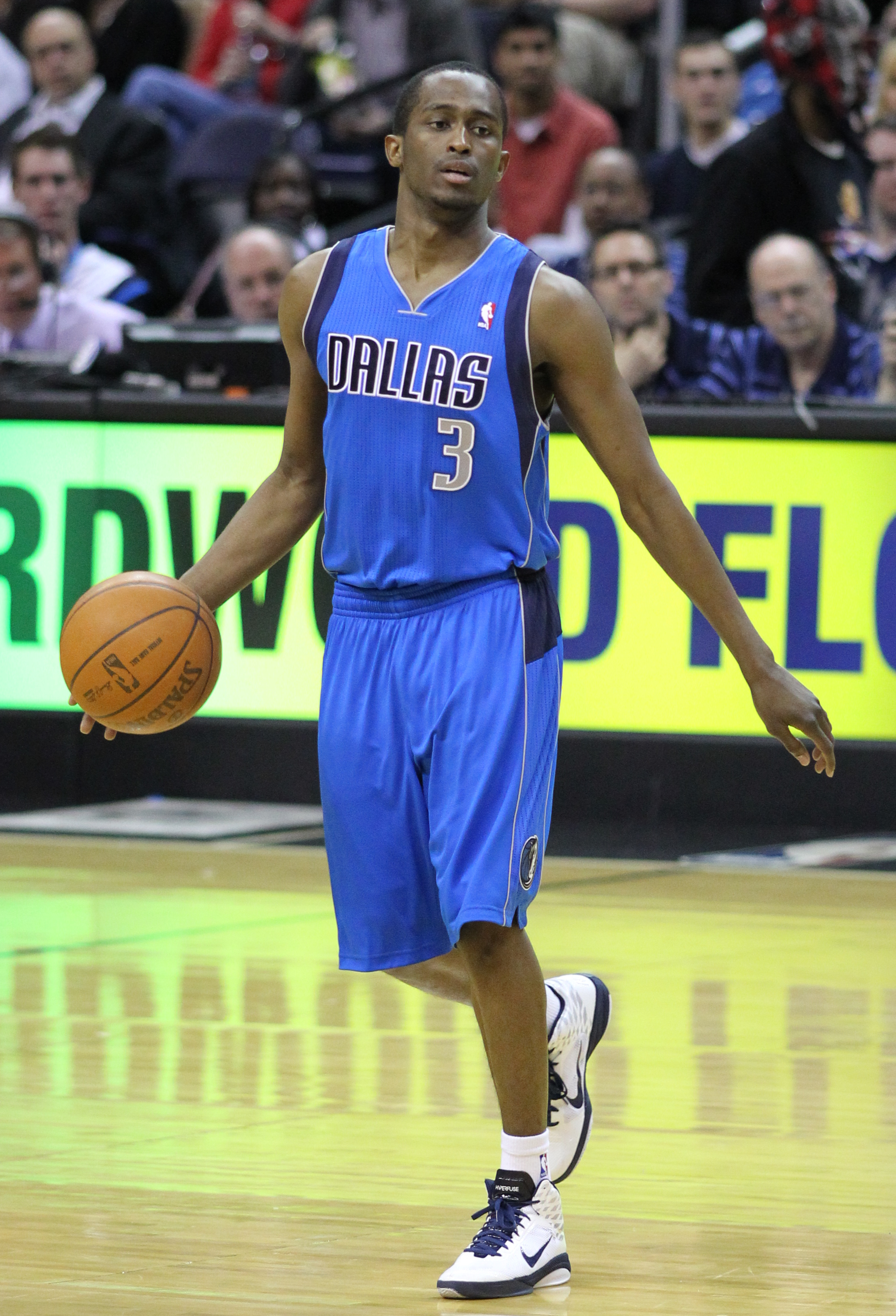
Beaubois with the Dallas Mavericks in 2011

Beaubois was an early entry candidate for the 2007 and 2008 NBA draft before withdrawing his name from consideration. Prior to the NBA draft, Beaubois caught the attention of scouts at the NBA Draft Combine with his measurements, boasting a 6' 9.75" wingspan (which is extraordinarily long, given his height) and 39" vertical leap. He was selected 25th overall in the 2009 NBA draft by the Oklahoma City Thunder, who traded him, along with a future 2nd round draft pick, to the Dallas Mavericks for Byron Mullens, the 24th overall pick in the 2009 NBA draft.

Playing only 3 minutes, Beaubois made his NBA debut against the Los Angeles Lakers. On 5 March 2010, Beaubois scored 22 points against the Sacramento Kings, becoming the first Maverick rookie to score 20 or more points since Maurice Ager in 2007. 22 days later, Beaubois scored a career-high 40 points and made a rookie record of 9 of 11 three-pointers against fellow rookie Steph Curry and the Golden State Warriors. Moreover, he became the first rookie in NBA history to shoot at least 50 percent from the floor, 40 percent from 3-point range, and 80 percent from the free throw line. He became the third Maverick rookie with 40 or more points in a game. The Mavericks finished the season with a 55–27 record, clinching the second seed in the Western Conference. In the first round of the 2010 NBA Playoffs, Dallas faced their rival the San Antonio Spurs. The Mavericks were down by 22 points in the first half of Game 6. Needing a spark to the offense, coach Rick Carlisle subbed Beaubois in and he led them back into the game scoring 16 points, although the Mavericks lost the game and series.

In early August 2010, Beaubois broke his foot while training with the French national basketball team. On 30 November 2010, Beaubois was assigned to the Texas Legends of the NBA D-League, but never played a single game with the team. In February 2011 he returned to practice with the Mavericks. After missing nearly 6 months due to a fractured foot, Beaubois made his season debut against the Sacramento Kings on 16 February 2011. In 21 minutes, he logged 13 points, 6 assists, 3 steals and 3 turnovers. The Mavericks went on to win the game 116–100. The following game against the Phoenix Suns Beaubois replaced DeShawn Stevenson in the starting lineup. Just before the start of the 2011 playoffs Beaubois sprained his left foot in a game against the Warriors. He was replaced in the starting line-up by Stevenson and did not return to action or see playing time during the two-month playoff run leading to the Mavericks' victories over the Blazers, Lakers, Thunder, and Heat en route to their first NBA Championship.

In late June 2011, Beaubois had foot surgery on his left foot for the second time. The Mavericks announced on 30 June 2011, that they exercised the contract option for Beaubois. In his first start of the 2011–12 season, Beaubois scored 22 points and grabbed 6 rebounds, adding career highs in assists with 7 and blocks with 4, in a win over the Utah Jazz. Dallas was swept in first round of the 2012 playoffs by Oklahoma City.

Beaubois scored a team high (and personal season high) of 19 points in 16 minutes against the Spurs on 25 January 2013. He underwent surgery to repair a fractured second metacarpal in his left hand near the end of the 2012–13 season. "I feel bad for the kid," Dirk Nowitzki said after Beaubois broke his hand against the Thunder on 17 March. "It's just sad. Just so many injuries. He's been here for four years and has missed a lot of action. It's tough. We feel bad for him. But he's a good kid." The Mavericks missed the playoffs for the first time since the 1999–00 season.

=== Spirou Charleroi (2014) ===
On 26 March 2014, he signed with Spirou Charleroi of the Belgian League for the rest of the 2013–14 season. Beaubois averaged 9.4 points, 3.8 rebounds and 2.4 assists in 25.4 minutes per game for Spirou. Charleroi was defeated in the Playoff Quarterfinals by Port of Antwerp Giants.

=== France (2014–2016) ===
On 19 June 2014, Beaubois signed with Le Mans Sarthe Basket for the rest of the 2014–15 LNB Pro A season.

On 7 July 2015, he signed a one-year contract with SIG Strasbourg.

=== Baskonia (2016–2018) ===
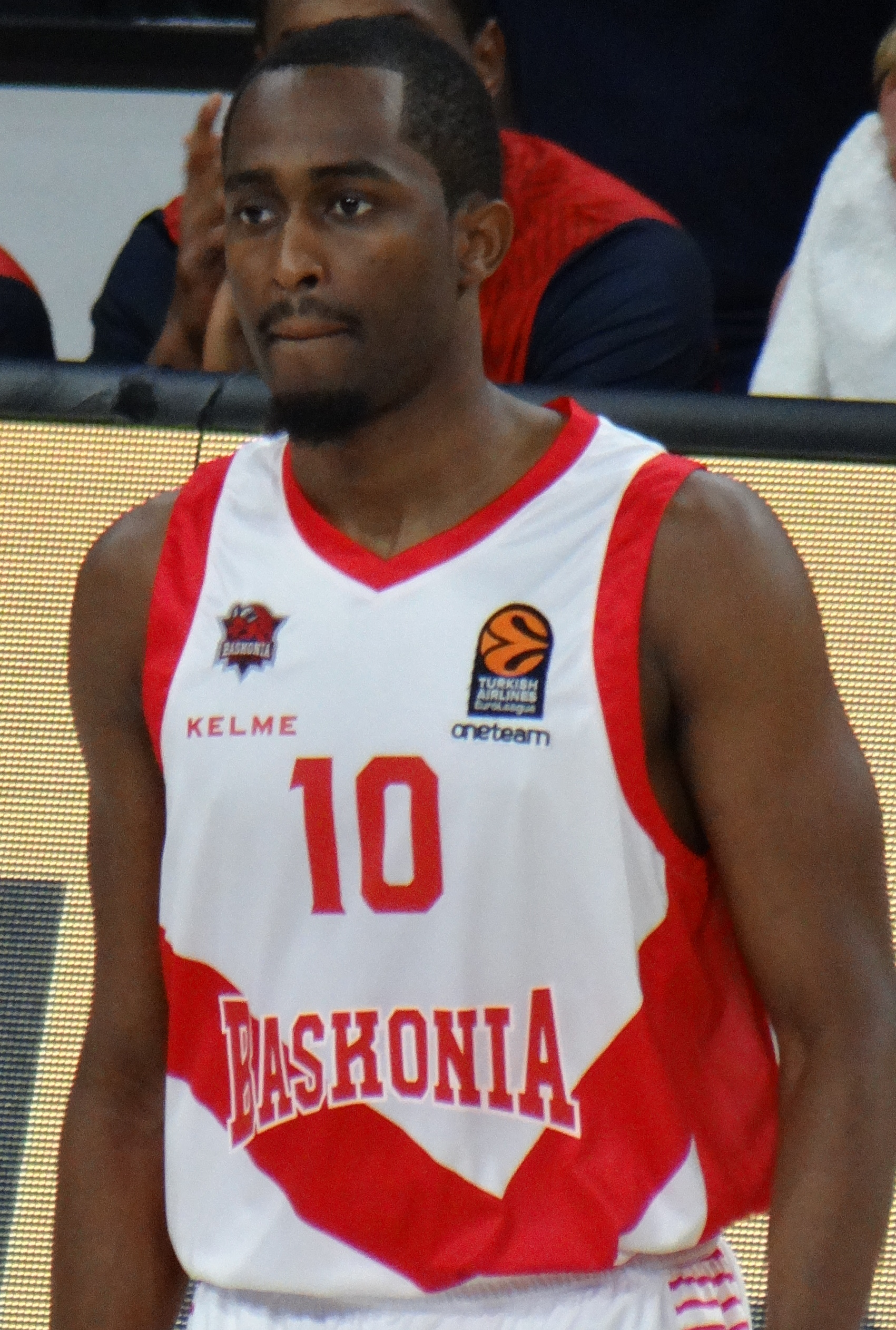
Beaubois with Baskonia in 2017

On 22 July 2016, he signed a two-year deal with Baskonia of the Spanish Liga ACB and the EuroLeague. In his second season, he was the second-leading scorer of Baskonia in the EuroLeague, with 12.4 points per game.

=== Anadolu Efes (2018–2026) ===
On 21 June 2018, Beaubois signed with Anadolu Efes of the Turkish Basketbol Süper Ligi and EuroLeague. During the 2018–19 EuroLeague season, he appeared in 35 games, averaging 9.5 points and 2.3 assists per game.

On 23 June 2023, Beaubois extended his contract with the Turkish powerhouse for an additional two years (1+1 format). On 4 July 2025, he renewed his contract with Anadolu Efes once again, signing another two-year deal (1+1 format).

On July 13, 2026, Beaubois and the team officially announced his departure.

== Career statistics ==
Legend
GP	Games played	GS	Games started	MPG	Minutes per game
FG%	Field-goal percentage	3P%	3-point field-goal percentage	FT%	Free-throw percentage
RPG	Rebounds per game	APG	Assists per game	SPG	Steals per game
BPG	Blocks per game	PPG	Points per game	PIR	Performance index rating
**Bold**	Career high

=== NBA ===
==== Regular season ====
†	Won an NBA championship

Year	Team	GP	GS	MPG	FG%	3P%	FT%	RPG	APG	SPG	BPG	PPG
2009–10	Dallas	**56**	16	12.5	.**518**	.**409**	.808	1.4	1.3	.5	.2	7.1
2010–11†	Dallas	28	**26**	17.7	.422	.301	.767	1.9	2.3	.7	.3	8.4
2011–12	Dallas	53	12	**21.7**	.422	.288	**.841**	**2.8**	**2.9**	**1.1**	**.5**	**8.9**
2012–13	Dallas	45	0	12.2	.369	.292	.789	1.3	1.9	.4	.1	4.0
Career		182	54	15.9	.439	.325	.810	1.9	2.1	.7	.3	7.1

==== Playoffs ====
Year	Team	GP	GS	MPG	FG%	3P%	FT%	RPG	APG	SPG	BPG	PPG
2010	Dallas	**4**	0	**7.7**	**.474**	**.333**	**.333**	**1.5**	**1.0**	—	—	**5.3**
2012	Dallas	2	0	6.0	.000	.000	—	.5	**1.0**	—	—	0.0
Career		6	0	7.0	.429	.286	.333	1.2	1.0	—	—	3.5

=== EuroLeague ===
†	Denotes seasons in which Beaubois won the EuroLeague

Year	Team	GP	GS	MPG	FG%	3P%	FT%	RPG	APG	SPG	BPG	PPG	PIR
2015–16	SIG Strasbourg	10	10	23.7	.409	.370	**1.000**	1.7	**2.3**	**1.1**	.4	11.8	7.8
2016–17	Baskonia	30	12	20.3	.457	.380	.870	1.4	1.7	.4	.5	11.7	8.4
2017–18	Baskonia	33	17	21.3	.498	.400	.894	**2.4**	1.8	.7	.4	**12.4**	10.6
2018–19	Anadolu Efes	35	19	20.5	.442	.400	.912	1.3	**2.3**	.3	.3	9.5	7.8
2019–20	Anadolu Efes	26	15	21.2	.455	.398	.821	1.6	1.7	.9	.3	9.5	7.9
2020–21†	Anadolu Efes	**38**	21	21.4	.512	**.493**	.909	1.8	1.8	.5	.3	10.6	9.4
2021–22†	Anadolu Efes	35	22	22.2	.442	.396	.667	2.0	1.9	.5	.3	9.2	8.3
2022–23	Anadolu Efes	30	**25**	**25.2**	**.536**	.486	.870	2.1	2.0	**1.1**	**.8**	10.8	**11.2**
2023–24	Anadolu Efes	31	9	23.2	.455	.392	.857	2.2	**2.3**	.7	.4	10.1	9.6
2024–25	Anadolu Efes	33	11	18.9	.509	.459	.869	1.4	1.6	.7	.3	8.9	8.1
2025–26	Anadolu Efes	21	4	12.3	.473	.357	**1.000**	1.2	1.1	.6	.2	5.1	4.7
Career		322	165	21.0	.475	.418	.863	1.8	1.9	.7	.4	10.0	8.7

=== EuroCup ===
Year	Team	GP	GS	MPG	FG%	3P%	FT%	RPG	APG	SPG	BPG	PPG	PIR
2015–16	SIG Strasbourg	14	14	26.6	.415	.378	.905	2.1	2.2	1.1	.3	12.1	9.1
Career		14	14	26.6	.415	.378	.905	2.1	2.2	1.1	.3	12.1	9.1

=== FIBA EuroChallenge ===
Year	Team	GP	GS	MPG	FG%	3P%	FT%	RPG	APG	SPG	BPG	PPG
2014–15	Le Mans	14	13	27.1	.493	.274	.882	3.0	3.1	1.4	.4	12.7
Career		14	13	27.1	.493	.274	.882	3.0	3.1	1.4	.4	12.7

=== Domestic leagues ===
Year	Team	League	GP	MPG	FG%	3P%	FT%	RPG	APG	SPG	BPG	PPG
2006–07	(France) Cholet	Pro A	20	0.9	.000	.000	—	.1	.0	—	—	0.0
2007–08	(France) Cholet	Pro A	21	15.1	.473	.435	.778	1.8	1.4	.7	.5	5.5
2008–09	(France) Cholet	Pro A	29	22.3	.473	.317	.583	2.5	2.3	1.1	.4	10.0
2013–14	(Belgium) Spirou Charleroi	PBL	12	24.3	.351	.286	.818	3.2	2.2	.6	.1	8.9
2014–15	(France) Le Mans	Pro A	34	26.7	.477	.346	.884	2.6	2.8	1.3	.1	14.4
2015–16	(France) SIG Strasbourg	Pro A	44	25.0	.571	.498	.880	2.0	1.8	.8	.2	16.1
2016–17	(Spain) Baskonia	ACB	33	20.6	.453	.288	.786	1.8	1.9	.5	.1	10.9
2017–18	(Spain) Baskonia	ACB	41	20.0	.500	.420	.837	2.7	2.1	.7	.3	11.4
2018–19	(Turkey) Anadolu Efes	TBSL	23	24.1	.500	.428	.958	2.8	2.4	.9	.3	13.5
2019–20	(Turkey) Anadolu Efes	TBSL	14	23.1	.497	.402	.722	2.6	2.4	.8	.5	13.7
2020–21	(Turkey) Anadolu Efes	TBSL	23	19.9	.508	.409	.839	2.0	2.4	.3	.1	11.0
2021–22	(Turkey) Anadolu Efes	TBSL	23	22.8	.530	.477	.854	1.8	2.2	.8	.5	14.1
2022–23	(Turkey) Anadolu Efes	TBSL	24	27.0	.560	.512	.875	1.6	2.0	.8	1.0	14.6
2023–24	(Turkey) Anadolu Efes	TBSL	27	25.6	.480	.438	.930	2.7	3.1	1.0	.2	14.4
2024–25	(Turkey) Anadolu Efes	TBSL	13	18.6	.510	.462	.833	2.0	2.1	.7	.8	11.2

== National team career ==
Beaubois was a member of the French junior national teams. He later joined the French senior team. He did not participate in the 2012 Summer Olympics, due to his 2010 injury, nor did he contend in EuroBasket 2013.

== See also ==
- List of European basketball players in the United States
