= Eurocup Basketball 2010–11 Regular Season Group F =

Standings and results for Group F of the regular season phase of the 2010–11 Eurocup basketball tournament.

== Standings ==
Key to colors
Top two places in each group advance to Last 16

	Team	Pld	W	L	PF	PA	Diff
1.	(Italy) Benetton Basket Bwin	6	6	0	454	414	+40
2.	(Spain) Asefa Estudiantes	6	3	3	483	462	+21
3.	(Greece) PAOK BC	6	3	3	449	438	+11
4.	(France) Chorale Roanne	6	0	6	423	495	−72

== Fixtures and results ==
All times given below are in Central European Time.

=== Game 1 ===
16 November 2010
20:00

Report

Asefa Estudiantes (Spain)	88–77	(Greece) PAOK BC
Scoring by quarter: 17–14, 20–19, 20–19, 31–25
Pts: Jasen 16; Rebs: Gabriel 8 Asts: Granger, Caner-Medley 5		Pts: Papadopoulos 24; Rebs: Papadopoulos 17; Asts: Papadopoulos 4

Palacio Vistalegre
Attendance: 2,500
Referees: Dubravko Muhvic (CRO), Oscar Lefwerth (SWE), Jurgis Laurinavicius (LTU)

16 November 2010
20:45

Report

Benetton Basket Bwin (Italy)	67–61	(France) Chorale Roanne
Scoring by quarter: 13–23, 9–14, 22–12, 23–12
Pts: Toolson 14; Rebs: Motiejūnas 7 Asts: Bulleri 3		Pts: Nsonwu, Amagou 13; Rebs: Nsonwu 11; Asts: Diabate, Amagou 3

Palaverde
Attendance: 2,480
Referees: Andrej Lovsyn (SLO), Dragan Neskovic (SRB), Seffi Shemmesh (ISR)

=== Game 2 ===
23 November 2010
19:00

Report

PAOK BC (Greece)	62–67	(Italy) Benetton Basket Bwin
Scoring by quarter: 10–11, 16–24, 16–15, 20–17
Pts: Papadopoulos 17; Rebs: Papadopoulos 17; Asts: four players 1		Pts: Motiejūnas 13; Rebs: Marković 8 Asts: Marković 6

PAOK Sports Arena
Attendance: 2,000
Referees: Ilija Belosevic (SRB), Joseph Bissang (FRA), Ademir Zurapovic (BIH)

23 November 2010
20:00

Report

Chorale Roanne (France)	89–93	(Spain) Asefa Estudiantes
Scoring by quarter: 25–25, 21–22, 23–28, 20–18
Pts: Rivers 17; Rebs: Bogdanović 7 Asts: Nsonwu 6		Pts: Caner-Medley 21; Rebs: Caner-Medley 6 Asts: Granger 8

Halle André Vacheresse
Attendance: 3,000
Referees: Oscar Lefwerth (SWE), Carmello Paternico (ITA), Sergio Silva (POR)

=== Game 3 ===
30 November 2010
19:00

Report

PAOK BC (Greece)	92–74	(France) Chorale Roanne
Scoring by quarter: 32–14, 18–24, 26–24, 16–12
Pts: Marshall 23; Rebs: Gečevski 11; Asts: Papadopoulos 4		Pts: Nsonwu 22; Rebs: Nsonwu 10; Asts: Nsonwu 3

PAOK Sports Arena
Attendance: 1,300
Referees: Sasa Maricic (SRB), Sergiy Zashchuck (UKR), Aleksandar Milojevik (MKD)

30 November 2010
19:00

Report

Asefa Estudiantes (Spain)	71–80	(Italy) Benetton Basket Bwin
Scoring by quarter: 18–26, 21–16, 13–18, 19–20
Pts: Gabriel 14; Rebs: Gabriel 5 Asts: Welsch 4		Pts: Smith 22; Rebs: Brunner 10; Asts: Marković 6

Palacio Vistalegre
Attendance: 2,500
Referees: Luis Lopes (POR), Nicola Maesre (FRA), Arnis Ouols (LAT)

=== Game 4 ===
7 December 2010
20:00

Report

Chorale Roanne (France)	60–72	(Greece) PAOK BC
Scoring by quarter: 21–25, 11–18, 13–13, 15–16
Pts: Amagou, Page 9 Rebs: Nsonwu 8 Asts: three players 2		Pts: Marshall 19; Rebs: Papadopoulos 11; Asts: Gray, Papadopoulos 3

Halle André Vacheresse
Attendance: 3,000
Referees: Fernando Rocha (POR), Oscar Perea (ESP), Francisco Araña (ESP)

7 December 2010
20:45

Report

Benetton Basket Bwin (Italy)	79–72	(Spain) Asefa Estudiantes
Scoring by quarter: 15–15, 25–18, 20–19, 19–20
Pts: Motiejūnas 19; Rebs: Brunner 11; Asts: Marković 4		Pts: Caner-Medley 17; Rebs: Jasen 12; Asts: Sánchez 2

Palaverde
Attendance: 3,864
Referees: Robert Lottermoser (GER), Oliver Krause (GER), Sergiy Zashchuck (UKR)

=== Game 5 ===
14 December 2010
19:00

Report

PAOK BC (Greece)	77–72	(Spain) Asefa Estudiantes
Scoring by quarter: 23–19, 17–10, 17–27, 20–16
Pts: Marshall 18; Rebs: Papadopoulos 11; Asts: McGrath 5		Pts: Clark 16; Rebs: Sánchez, Caner-Medley 5 Asts: Granger 4

PAOK Sports Arena
Attendance: 3,000
Referees: David Chambon (FRA), Rustu Nuran (TUR), Alfred Jovovic (CRO)

14 December 2010
20:00

Report

Chorale Roanne (France)	79–84	(Italy) Benetton Basket Bwin
Scoring by quarter: 22–20, 21–24, 18–15, 18–25
Pts: Nsonwu 15; Rebs: Dunn 11; Asts: Amagou 7		Pts: Motiejūnas 17; Rebs: Brunner 6 Asts: Marković 9

Halle André Vacheresse
Attendance: 2,500
Referees: Juan Carlos Mitjana (ESP), Anna Cardus (ESP), Haris Bijedic (BIH)

=== Game 6 ===
21 December 2010
19:45

Report

Benetton Basket Bwin (Italy)	77–69	(Greece) PAOK BC
Scoring by quarter: 21–20, 17–17, 17–16, 22–16
Pts: Motiejūnas 16; Rebs: Smith, Brunner 6 Asts: Marković 4		Pts: Marshall, Gray 18; Rebs: Papadopoulos 10; Asts: Papadopoulos 3

Palaverde
Attendance: 2,050
Referees: Juan Carlos Garcia Gonzalez (ESP), Andrej Jersan (SLO), Petri Mantyla (FIN)

21 December 2010
19:45

Report

Asefa Estudiantes (Spain)	87–60	(France) Chorale Roanne
Scoring by quarter: 23–12, 25–27, 21–12, 18–9
Pts: Jasen 18; Rebs: Caner-Medley 8 Asts: Granger 6		Pts: Page 13; Rebs: Dunn 7 Asts: three players 2

Madrid Arena
Attendance: 2,500
Referees: Ilija Belosevic (SRB), Marcin Kowalski (POL), Ademir Zurapovic (BIH)
