= Michael Bauer (basketball) =

American basketball player (born 1980)

Personal information
- Born: August 14, 1980 (age 46) Hastings, Minnesota
- Listed height: 6 ft 8 in (2.03 m)
- Listed weight: 220 lb (100 kg)

Career information
- High school: Hastings (Hastings, Minnesota)
- College: Minnesota (1999–2004)
- NBA draft: 2004: undrafted
- Playing career: 2004–2010
- Position: Power forward

Career history
- 2004–2005: Waikato Titans
- 2005: BBC Amicale Steinsel
- 2005–2006: Chorale Roanne
- 2006–2007: Pau-Orthez
- 2007: Skyliners Frankfurt
- 2007–2008: SLUC Nancy
- 2008–2009: Base Oostende
- 2009–2010: Pau-Orthez

Career highlights
- French League All-Star (2006); French League champion (2008)

Michael Bauer (born August 14, 1980) is an American former professional basketball player. In 6 EuroChallenge appearances with Oostende, Bauer averaged 11.2 points per game. Previously, he has played professionally with Deutsche Bank Skyliners in Germany and Nancy, Roanne, and Pau-Orthez in France. He debuted professionally for Luxembourg club BBC Amicale Steinsel for the 2004–05 season. He was an all-star in Ligue Nationale de Basketball in 2006 while with Roanne.

Bauer is from Hastings, Minnesota, where he attended Hastings High School. Bauer played collegiate basketball for the Minnesota Golden Gophers. He held the several Gophers records for three-point shooting at the conclusion of his career. Bauer held marks of most three-pointers made (71) and attempted (191) from the 2002–03 season, before being passed in each mark by Lawrence Westbrook. As of 2025, Bauer is fourth in Minnesota history with 191 three-point field goals.
