= 2006–07 Pro A season =

2006–07 LNB Pro A season
- League: LNB Pro A
- Sport: Basketball
- Games: 306 (regular season)
- Teams: 18
- TV partner: Sport+

Regular Season
- Top seed: Roanne
- Season MVP: (United States) Dewarick Spencer (Roanne) (France) Cyril Julian (Nancy)
- Top scorer: (United States) Dewarick Spencer (Roanne)

2006-07 Finals
- Champions: Roanne
- Runners-up: Nancy

LNB Pro A seasons
- 2005–06 2007–08 →

The 2006–07 LNB Pro A season was the 85th season of the French Basketball Championship and the 20th season since inception of the Ligue Nationale de Basketball (LNB) . The regular season started on September 23, 2006 and ended on April 27, 2007. The play-offs were held from May 15, 2007 till June 2, 2007.

Roanne, after finishing at the second top seed of the regular season, won its second French Pro A League title by defeating Nancy in playoffs final (81-74).

== Promotion and relegation ==
Due to the change of the LNB Pro A league format from 18 clubs to 16 between the 2006–07 and 2007–08 seasons, only 1 club is promoted from 2006 to 2007 LNB Pro B league (French 2nd division) and 3 clubs are sent to 2007-08 Pro B league.

At the beginning of the 2006–07 season

Teams promoted from 2005 to 2006 Pro B

- Besançon
- Orléans

Teams relegated to 2006–07 Pro B

- Brest
- Rouen

At the end of the 2006–07 season

- 2006-07 Pro A Champion: Roanne

Teams promoted from 2006 to 2007 Pro B

- Vichy

Teams relegated to 2007–08 Pro B

- Besançon
- Bourg-en-Bresse
- Reims

== Team arenas ==
Location of teams in Pro A League 2007–08

Team	Home city	Stadium	Capacity
Besançon BCD	Besançon	Palais des Sports	4,000
JL Bourg-en-Bresse	Bourg-en-Bresse	Salle des Sports	2,300
ÉS Chalon-sur-Saône	Chalon-sur-Saône	Le Colisée	4,070
Cholet Basket	Cholet	La Meilleraie	5,191
Stade Clermontois BA	Clermont-Ferrand	Maison des Sports	4,630
JDA Dijon	Dijon	Palais des Sports Jean-Michel Geoffroy	5,000
BCM Gravelines Dunkerque	Gravelines	Sportica	3,500
Hyères Toulon Var Basket	Hyères – Toulon	Palais des Sports de Toulon; Espace 3000	4,700; 2,200
STB Le Havre	Le Havre	Salle des Docks Océane	3,598
Le Mans Sarthe Basket	Le Mans	Antarès	6,003
ASVEL Basket	Lyon – Villeurbanne	Astroballe	5,643
SLUC Nancy Basket	Nancy	Palais des Sports Jean Weille	6,027
Orléans Loiret Basket	Orléans	Zénith d'Orléans	5,338
Paris BR	Paris	Stade Pierre-de-Coubertin; Palais des Sports Marcel Cerdan	4,200; 4,000
Élan Béarnais Pau-Orthez	Pau-Orthez	Palais des Sports de Pau	7,813
Reims Champagne Basket	Reims	Complexe Sportif René Tys	3,000
Chorale Roanne Basket	Roanne	Halle André Vacheresse	3,300
Strasbourg IG	Strasbourg	Rhénus Sport	6,200

== Team standings ==
Clinched playoff berth
Relegated

#	Team	Pld	W	L	PF	PA
1	Nancy	34	25	9	2825	2498
2	Roanne	34	24	10	2942	2780
3	Chalon-sur-Saône	34	23	11	2684	2623
4	Strasbourg	34	22	12	2753	2480
5	Lyon-Villeurbanne	34	21	13	2752	2549
6	Le Mans	34	21	13	2529	2375
7	Cholet	34	19	15	2424	2408
8	Gravelines-Dunkerque	34	18	16	2625	2579
9	Pau-Lacq-Orthez	34	18	16	2747	2622
10	Dijon	34	18	16	2642	2620
11	Orléans	34	18	16	2569	2590
12	Le Havre	34	16	18	2637	2698
13	Clermont-Ferrand	34	15	19	2402	2358
14	Paris BR	34	13	21	2453	2662
15	Hyères Toulon	34	11	23	2606	2838
16	Besançon	34	11	23	2744	2880
17	Bourg-en-Bresse	34	8	26	2294	2673
18	Reims	34	5	29	2361	2755

== Playoffs ==
Quarter Finals
1	Nancy	2
8	Gravelines-Dunkerque	1
4	Strasbourg	0
5	Lyon-Villeurbanne	2
2	Roanne	2
7	Cholet	0
3	Chalon-sur-Saône	2
6	Le Mans	1

Semifinals
1	Nancy	2
5	Lyon-Villeurbanne	0
2	Roanne	2
3	Chalon-sur-Saône	1

Finals
1	Nancy	74
2	Roanne	81

== Awards ==
=== Regular season MVPs ===
- "Foreign" MVP: (United States) Dewarick Spencer (Roanne)
- "French" MVP: (France) Cyril Julian (Nancy)

=== Best Coach ===
- (France) Jean-Denys Choulet (Roanne)

=== Best Defensive Player ===
- (France) Marc-Antoine Pellin (Roanne)

=== Rising Star Award ===
- (France) Nicolas Batum (Le Mans)
