= Nicolas Batum =

French basketball player (born 1988)

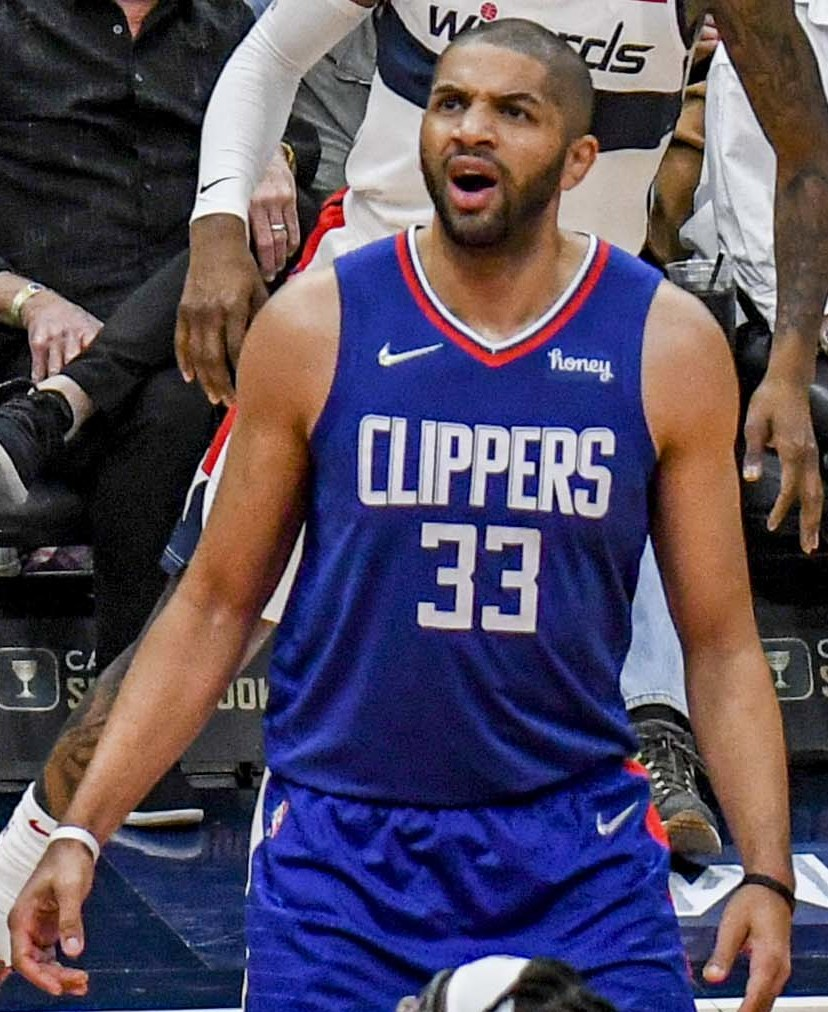
- Batum with the Los Angeles Clippers in 2022

Personal information
- Born: 14 December 1988 (age 37) Lisieux, France
- Listed height: 6 ft 7 in (2.01 m)
- Listed weight: 230 lb (104 kg)

Career information
- NBA draft: 2008: 1st round, 25th overall pick
- Drafted by: Houston Rockets
- Playing career: 2006–2026
- Position: Small forward / power forward
- Number: 8, 5, 88, 33, 40

Career history
- 2006–2008: Le Mans Sarthe
- 2008–2015: Portland Trail Blazers
- 2011: SLUC Nancy
- 2015–2020: Charlotte Hornets
- 2020–2023: Los Angeles Clippers
- 2023–2024: Philadelphia 76ers
- 2024–2026: Los Angeles Clippers

Career highlights
- As player: 2× LNB Pro A Best Young Player (2007, 2008); Match des Champions winner (2011); Match des Champions MVP (2011); French player of the year (2021); Albert Schweitzer Tournament MVP (2006); FIBA Europe Under-18 Championship MVP (2006)

Career NBA statistics
- Points: 11,553 (9.6 ppg)
- Rebounds: 5,656 (4.7 rpg)
- Assists: 3,612 (3.0 apg)
- Stats at NBA.com
- Stats at Basketball Reference
Medals
Men's basketball
Representing France
Summer Olympics
Silver medal – second place	2020 Tokyo	Team
Silver medal – second place	2024 Paris	Team
FIBA World Cup
Bronze medal – third place	2014 Spain
Bronze medal – third place	2019 China
EuroBasket
Gold medal – first place	2013 Slovenia
Silver medal – second place	2011 Lithuania
Bronze medal – third place	2015 France–Croatia–Germany–Latvia
U-18 European Championship
Gold medal – first place	2006 Greece	Team

Nicolas Madelin Victor Andre Batum (/ˈniːkoʊlə bəˈtuːm/ NEE-koh-lə bə-TOOM; born 14 December 1988) is a French former professional basketball player. He also represented the French national team and earned a silver medal in the 2020 Summer Olympics in Tokyo and in the 2024 Summer Olympics in Paris. In the National Basketball Association (NBA), Batum played for the Portland Trail Blazers, Charlotte Hornets, Los Angeles Clippers, and Philadelphia 76ers.

== Early life ==
Batum was born in Lisieux, in the Calvados department, to a French mother and a father of Cameroonian origin. His father, Richard, was a professional basketball player in France. Richard died during a game in 1991 after suffering an aneurysm. Nicolas, at only 2 1/2 years old, and his mother were in the crowd to witness Richard's death.

== Recruiting ==
Batum delivered an impressive performance at the 2007 Nike Hoop Summit scoring 23 points (9/13 FG, 3/5 for 3 pointers) in 28 minutes. He also grabbed four rebounds and recorded four steals.

As a youngster, Nicolas Batum was considered one of the most talented young players in Europe, as he was ranked #17 among international players born in 1988, by the scouting website DraftExpress.com at the time he entered the 2008 NBA draft.

== Professional career ==
=== Le Mans Sarthe (2006–2008) ===
Batum was part of the junior French national team that won the 2004 FIBA Europe Under-16 Championship. He was named the MVP of the 2006 FIBA Europe Under-18 Championship, as France won the gold medal at that tournament.

While playing for Le Mans, Batum averaged 3.4 points (65.9% FG), 2.5 rebounds, 0.5 assist per game in 13 minutes for the 2006–2007 French league season, and 12.3 points (52.3%), 5.0 rebounds and 3.6 assists per game in 28 minutes for the 2007–2008 season.

=== Portland Trail Blazers (2008–2011) ===
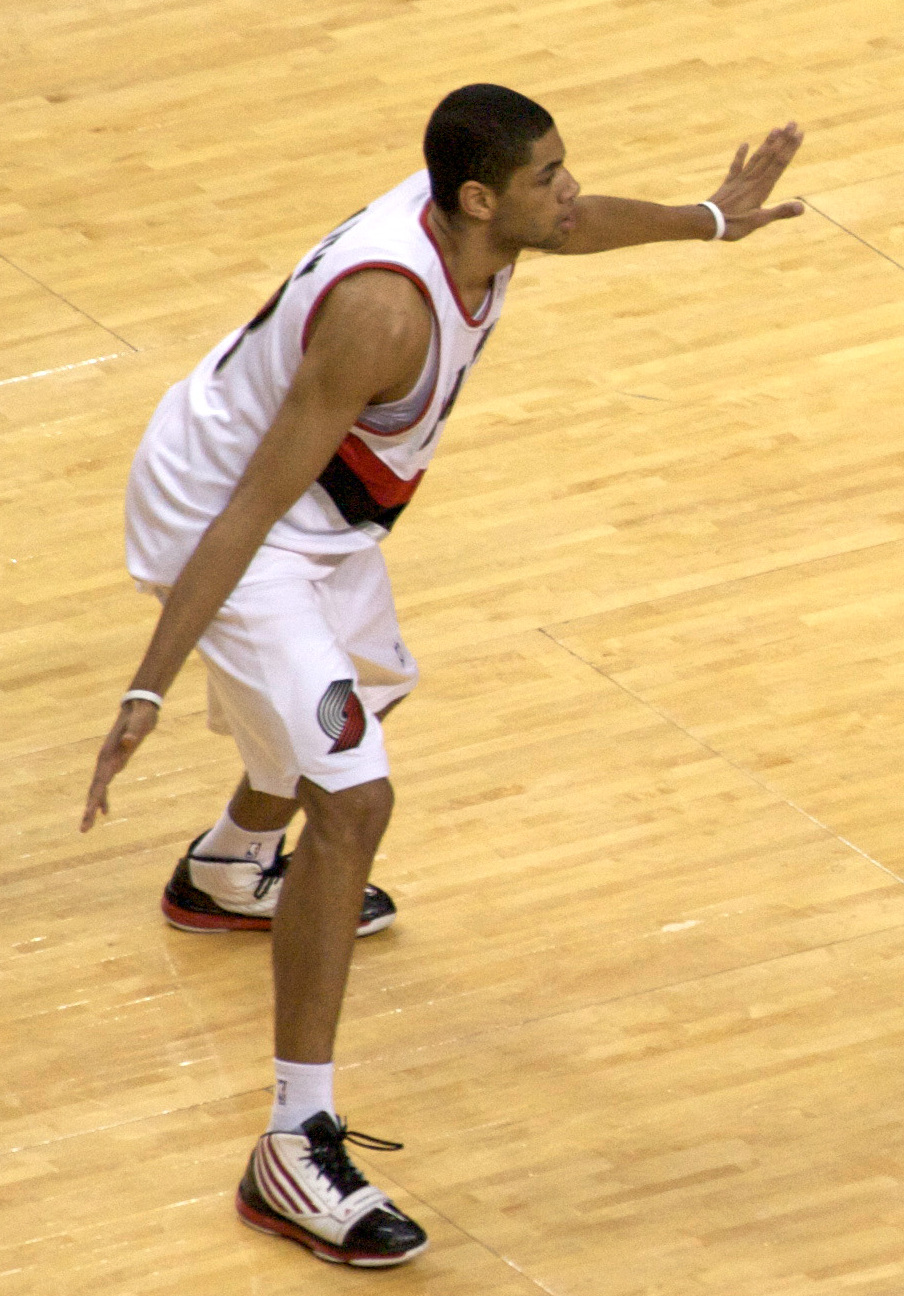
Batum with the Portland Trail Blazers in 2010

Upon being selected with the 25th pick in the 2008 NBA draft by the Houston Rockets, Batum was traded to the Portland Trail Blazers for the rights to Darrell Arthur and Joey Dorsey.

After coming off the bench for the first three games of his NBA career, Batum moved into the starting lineup in place of Travis Outlaw in Portland's fourth game of the 2008–09 season, a 103–96 loss to the Utah Jazz. On March 13, 2009, Batum recorded a season-high 20 points to go along with a clutch three-pointer with 29.9 seconds left, en route to a 109–100 victory over the New Jersey Nets.

Batum missed the first 45 games of the 2009–10 season due to torn cartilage in his right shoulder. He played in his first game of the season on January 25, 2010.

Batum scored more than 30 points for the first time with a 31-point performance (including 7 rebounds, 7 assists, and 3 steals) on February 27, 2010, against the Minnesota Timberwolves.

=== SLUC Nancy (2011) ===
In August 2011, during the 2011 NBA lockout, he signed a one-year contract with SLUC Nancy in French Basketball League which was valid until the NBA lockout ended.

=== Return to Portland (2011–2015) ===
Batum returned to Portland after the lockout ended.

On June 25, 2012, the Portland Trail Blazers extended a qualifying offer to Batum, making him a restricted free agent. Less than three weeks later Batum signed a $46 million/4 year offer sheet with the Minnesota Timberwolves. On July 18, 2012, the Trail Blazers elected to match the Timberwolves' offer, signing Batum to the team through the 2015–16 campaign.

On November 16, 2012, Batum tied a career-high of 35 points in a 119–117 overtime win against the Houston Rockets. This was followed exactly one month later by a game in which Batum recorded the 15th "five-by-five" in the NBA since the 1985–86 season, and the first since Andrei Kirilenko in January 2006. In this effort Batum scored 11 points while racking up 10 assists, 5 rebounds, 5 blocks and 5 steals in a 95–94 win against the New Orleans Hornets.

On January 21, 2013, Batum recorded his first triple-double in a 98–95 loss to the Washington Wizards, scoring 12 points and adding 10 rebounds, and 11 assists, in addition to 3 steals and 2 blocks.

Batum had a career year in 2012–13, as he finished with career-highs in nearly every statistic. His biggest improvement was his passing; he averaged 4.9 assists, more than triple his previous career-high (1.5 assists per game during the 2010–11 season).

=== Charlotte Hornets (2015–2020) ===
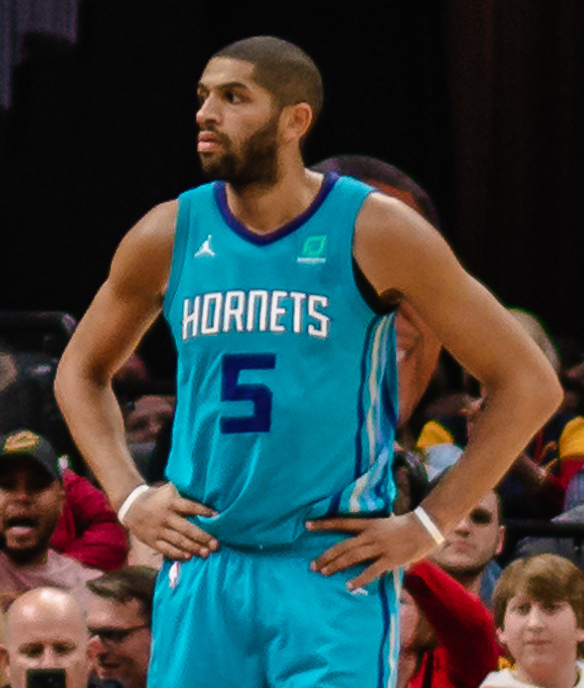
Batum with the Charlotte Hornets in 2019

On June 24, 2015, Batum was traded to the Charlotte Hornets in exchange for Gerald Henderson, Jr. and Noah Vonleh. On August 1, 2015, Batum played for Team Africa at the 2015 NBA Africa exhibition game. He made his debut for the Hornets in the team's season opener against the Miami Heat on October 28, recording 9 points and 6 rebounds in a 104–94 loss. On November 15, he scored a season-high 33 points in a 106–94 win over the Portland Trail Blazers. The following day, he was named Eastern Conference Player of the Week for games played Monday, November 9 through Sunday, November 15. It was the first career Player of the Week award for Batum, who led the Hornets to a 3–1 record on the week. On December 9, he recorded his fifth career triple-double with 10 points, 11 rebounds and 11 assists in a 99–81 win over the Miami Heat. In early January, he missed four games with a right toe injury. Later that month, he missed three more games with the same injury. On March 29, he recorded his second triple-double of the season with 19 points, 12 rebounds and 12 assists in a 100–85 win over the Philadelphia 76ers.

On July 7, 2016, Batum re-signed with the Hornets on a five-year, $120 million contract. On December 23, 2016, he recorded his first triple-double of the season with 20 points, 11 rebounds and 10 assists in a 103–91 win over the Chicago Bulls.

On October 5, 2017, Batum was ruled out for six to eight weeks with a tear of the ulnar collateral ligament in his left elbow. Batum made his season debut on November 15, 2017, scoring 16 points in 32 minutes as a starter in a 115–107 loss to the Cleveland Cavaliers. A week later, Batum left the Hornets' game against the Washington Wizards in the second quarter with a left elbow contusion and did not return. On January 31, 2018, he had 10 points, 11 rebounds and 10 assists in a 123–110 win over the Atlanta Hawks. On March 10, 2018, he recorded 29 points, 12 rebounds and seven assists in a 122–115 win over the Phoenix Suns. Five days later, he recorded a career-high 16 assists to go with 10 points and 10 rebounds in a 129–117 win over the Hawks. On October 24, 2019, Batum was sidelined for two to three weeks due to an avulsion fracture on the third finger of his left hand.

Batum was waived by the Hornets November 29, 2020.

=== Los Angeles Clippers (2020–2023) ===
On December 1, 2020, after clearing waivers, Batum signed a minimum deal with the Los Angeles Clippers.

On August 13, 2021, Batum re-signed with the Clippers on a two-year, $6.5 million contract.

On July 6, 2022, Batum re-signed with the Clippers on a two-year, $22.5 million deal.

=== Philadelphia 76ers (2023–2024) ===
On 1 November 2023, the Philadelphia 76ers acquired Batum, Marcus Morris Sr., Kenyon Martin Jr. and Robert Covington from the Clippers in exchange for James Harden, P. J. Tucker, and Filip Petrušev. As part of the trade, the Clippers dealt a first-round pick, two second-round picks, a pick swap, and cash considerations to the 76ers, while sending a pick swap and cash considerations to the Oklahoma City Thunder.

=== Second stint with Los Angeles Clippers (2024–2026) ===
On 10 July 2024, the Los Angeles Clippers signed Batum on a two-year, $9.6 million deal. He made 78 appearances (eight starts) for Los Angeles during the 2024–25 NBA season, averaging 4.0 points, 2.8 rebounds, and 1.1 assists.

On 30 June 2025, Batum re-signed with the Clippers on a two-year, $11.5 million contract.

=== Retirement ===
On 21 September 2026, Batum announced his retirement from basketball.

== Player profile ==
Batum is regarded as a highly skilled defensive player and one of the NBA's best executors of the chase-down block. Growing up in Pont-l'Évêque, Normandy, the lanky Batum was among the tallest boys of his age group and began his basketball career as a center. Inspiration had been drawn from NBA shot-blocking specialist Dikembe Mutombo, known for theatrically wagging his finger after rejections — an affectation which Batum emulated.

Batum noted in a 2013 interview with the Portland Oregonian that, as he got older, he was moved from the low post to the wing, where he was no longer able to make the face-up block, a signature component of his game. "I couldn't block it like I used to when I played inside, so when I would see a guy going down the court on a fast break, I used to run behind him and get the block".

The chase-down block thus became a fundamental part of Batum's game and was a skill brought with him to the NBA. Through March 2013, only two players in the 2012–13 season who did not play center or power forward had performed more blocks than Batum — Josh Smith and Kevin Durant.

On May 31, 2021, Batum started as a center for the Los Angeles Clippers against the Dallas Mavericks in game four of the 2021 NBA playoffs.

== National team career ==
=== Youth career ===
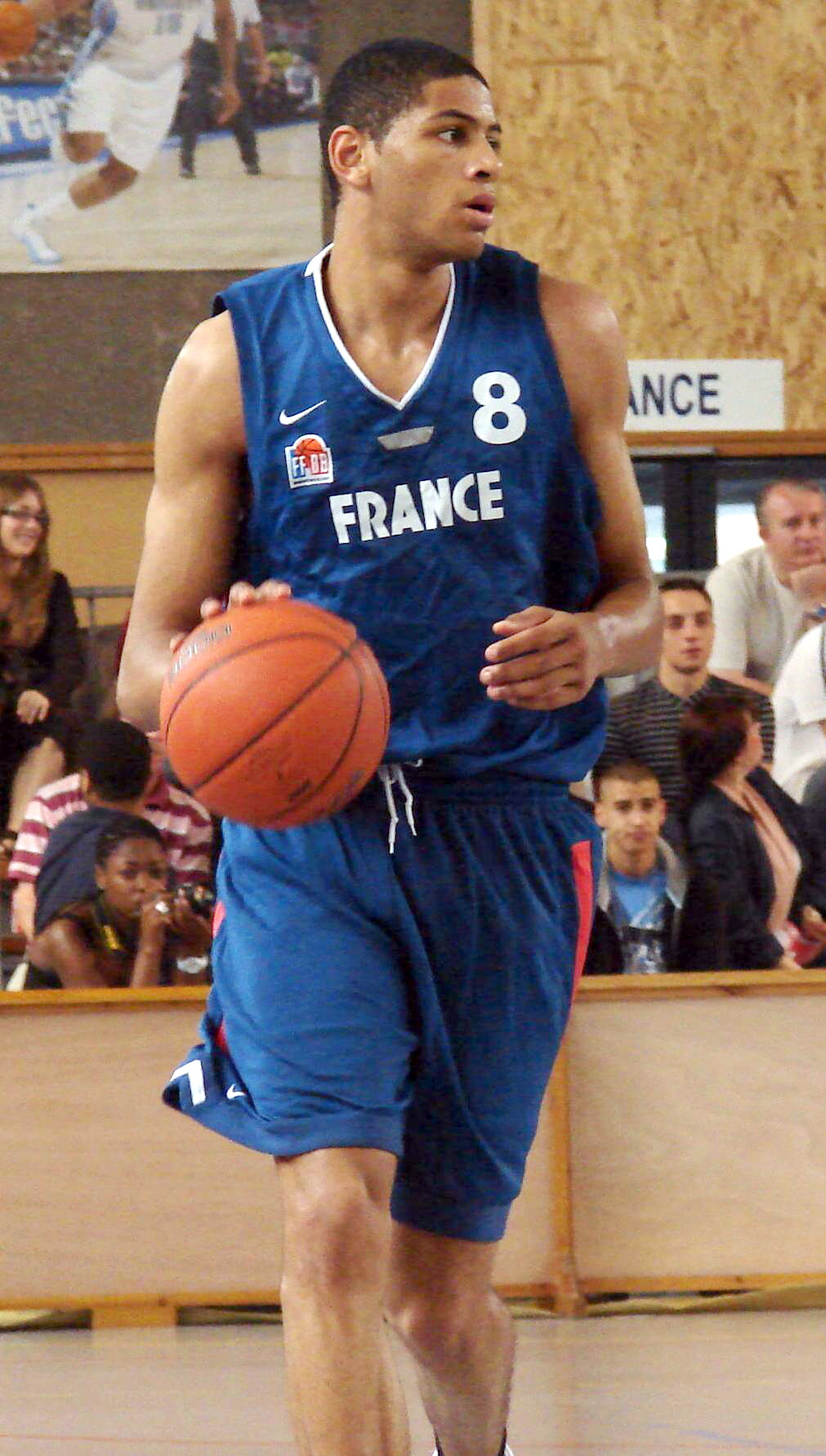
Batum with the French youth team during the 2007 Douai Tournament

In 2006, Batum was named the most valuable player of the Under-18 Albert Schweitzer Tournament in Mannheim, Germany, as part of the tournament-winning French national team. Batum averaged 19 points, over 5 rebounds, and over 2 steals per game, during the seven game tournament.

=== 2012 Summer Olympics ===
Batum played for the senior men's French national basketball team at the 2012 Summer Olympics. Late in a 66–59 quarterfinal loss to Spain, a frustrated Batum punched Spanish player Juan Carlos Navarro in the groin. After the game, Batum said, "I wanted to give him a good reason to flop." Batum later apologized on Twitter, writing, "I showed a bad image of France and myself. and the city of Portland Oregon. Congrats to team Spain."

=== 2014 FIBA World Cup ===
Batum was a member of the French national team that finished third-place in the 2014 FIBA Basketball World Cup, becoming the first French team to win a medal in a FIBA Basketball World Cup competition. In the final two games he averaged 31.0 points and was subsequently named to the all-tournament team.

=== 2020 Summer Olympics ===
Batum blocked Klemen Prepelič at the last second of the 2020 Olympics semi final giving victory to France. France eventually lost the final 87–82 to the United States. Rudy Gobert stated that Batum's game-saving play was one of the best blocks he had ever seen. His block was ranked as one of the unforgettable moments of the 2020 Summer Olympics.

=== French national team individual awards and honors ===
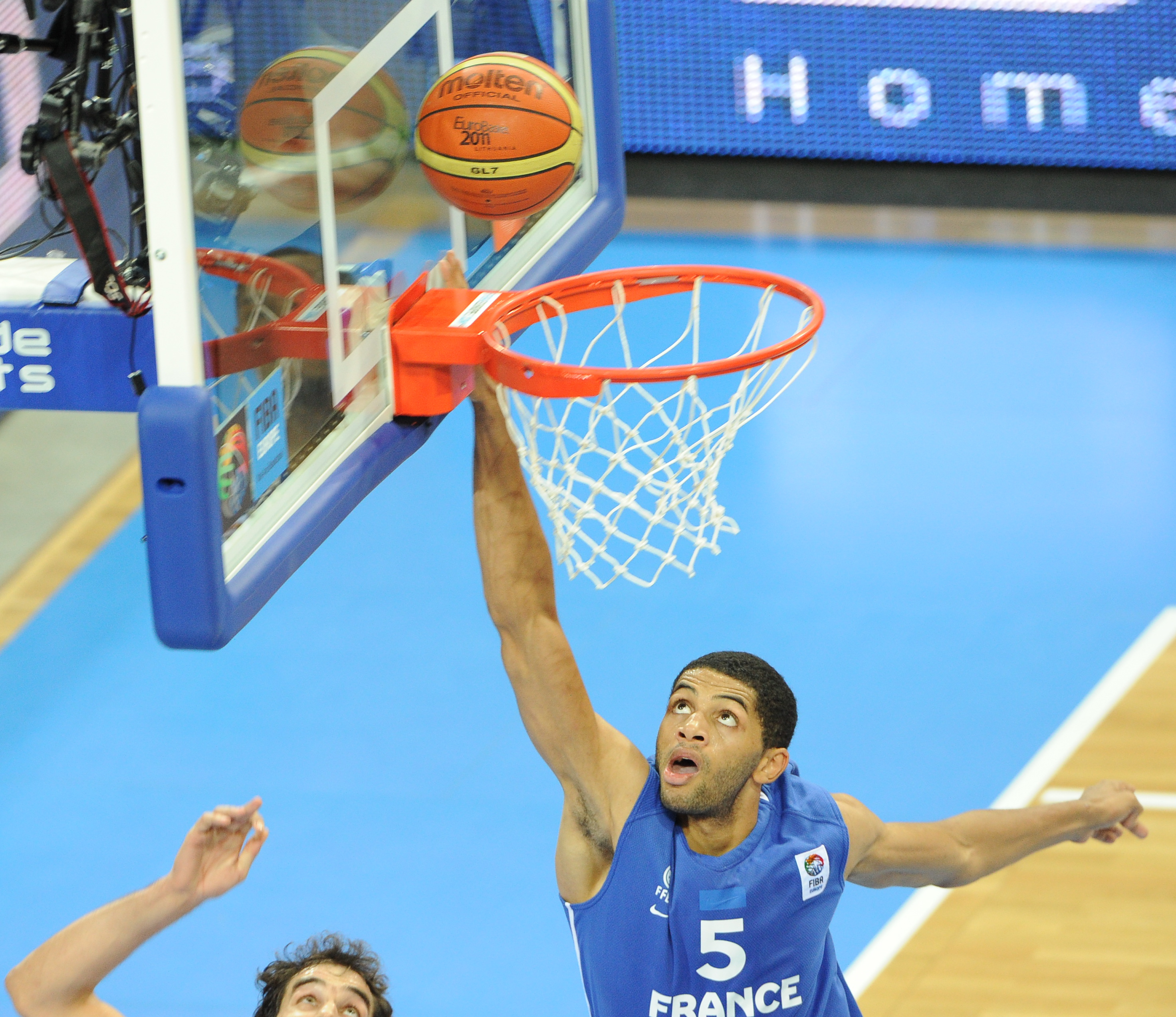
Batum with France at the 2011 Eurobasket

- Olympic Games: Silver (2020), Silver (2024)
- FIBA Basketball World Cup: Bronze (2014), Bronze (2019)
- FIBA EuroBasket: Gold (2013), Silver (2011), Bronze (2015)
- FIBA Europe Under-18 Championship: Gold 2006
- FIBA Under-19 World Cup: Bronze 2007
- FIBA World Cup All-Tournament Team: 2014
- FIBA Europe Under-18 Championship MVP: 2006
- FIBA Europe Under-18 All-Tournament Team: 2006

== Career statistics ==
Legend
GP	Games played	GS	Games started	MPG	Minutes per game
FG%	Field-goal percentage	3P%	3-point field-goal percentage	FT%	Free-throw percentage
RPG	Rebounds per game	APG	Assists per game	SPG	Steals per game
BPG	Blocks per game	PPG	Points per game	PIR	Performance index rating
**Bold**	Career high	*	Led the league

=== NBA ===
==== Regular season ====
Year	Team	GP	GS	MPG	FG%	3P%	FT%	RPG	APG	SPG	BPG	PPG
2008–09	Portland	79	76	18.4	.446	.369	.808	2.8	.9	.6	.5	5.4
2009–10	Portland	37	25	24.8	**.519**	**.409**	.843	3.8	1.2	.6	.7	10.1
2010–11	Portland	80	67	31.5	.455	.345	.841	4.5	1.5	.9	.6	12.4
2011–12	Portland	59	34	30.4	.451	.391	.836	4.6	1.4	1.0	1.0	13.9
2012–13	Portland	73	73	**38.4**	.423	.372	.848	5.6	4.9	**1.2**	1.1	14.3
2013–14	Portland	**82**	**82***	36.0	.465	.361	.803	**7.5**	5.1	.9	.7	13.0
2014–15	Portland	71	71	33.5	.400	.324	.857	5.9	4.8	1.1	.6	9.4
2015–16	Charlotte	70	70	35.0	.426	.348	.849	6.1	5.8	.9	.6	14.9
2016–17	Charlotte	77	77	34.0	.403	.333	.856	6.2	**5.9**	1.1	.4	**15.1**
2017–18	Charlotte	64	64	31.0	.415	.336	.831	4.8	5.5	1.0	.4	11.6
2018–19	Charlotte	75	72	31.4	.450	.389	.865	5.2	3.3	.9	.6	9.3
2019–20	Charlotte	22	3	23.0	.346	.286	**.900**	4.5	3.0	.8	.4	3.6
2020–21	L.A. Clippers	67	38	27.4	.464	.404	.828	4.7	2.2	1.0	.6	8.1
2021–22	L.A. Clippers	59	54	24.8	.463	.400	.658	4.3	1.7	1.0	.7	8.3
2022–23	L.A. Clippers	78	19	21.9	.420	.391	.708	3.8	1.6	.7	.6	6.1
2023–24	L.A. Clippers	3	0	18.0	.375	.286	—	2.3	1.7	1.0	**1.3**	2.7
2023–24	Philadelphia	57	38	25.9	.456	.399	.714	4.2	2.2	.8	.6	5.5
2024–25	L.A. Clippers	78	8	17.5	.437	.433	.810	2.8	1.1	.7	.5	4.0
2025–26	L.A. Clippers	74	6	17.5	.403	.404	.818	2.5	.9	.6	.3	4.0
Career		1,205	877	28.2	.436	.371	.831	4.7	3.0	.9	.6	9.6

==== Playoffs ====
Year	Team	GP	GS	MPG	FG%	3P%	FT%	RPG	APG	SPG	BPG	PPG
2009	Portland	6	5	10.5	**.556**	**.500**	—	.5	.2	.2	.3	2.0
2010	Portland	6	6	23.1	.459	.429	.750	3.2	.8	.3	.0	8.2
2011	Portland	6	0	25.1	.413	.269	.750	1.7	1.3	.8	.8	8.0
2014	Portland	11	**11**	**41.7**	.472	.350	.800	7.6	4.8	**1.3**	.5	**15.2**
2015	Portland	5	5	**41.7**	.343	.333	.769	**8.6**	**5.2**	.2	.2	14.2
2016	Charlotte	5	2	28.8	.378	.273	**.850**	3.6	2.0	.4	.0	11.4
2021	L.A. Clippers	**19**	10	29.2	.486	.389	.826	5.5	2.1	**1.3**	.5	8.1
2023	L.A. Clippers	5	3	18.3	.421	.353	—	2.2	1.2	.4	.4	4.4
2024	Philadelphia	6	0	28.3	.414	.409	.625	5.8	1.3	.2	.8	6.3
2025	L.A. Clippers	7	0	24.6	.394	.394	—	3.9	2.0	.9	**1.7**	5.6
Career		76	42	28.3	.436	.361	.791	4.7	2.2	.8	.6	8.6

=== EuroLeague ===
Year	Team	GP	GS	MPG	FG%	3P%	FT%	RPG	APG	SPG	BPG	PPG	PIR
2006–07	Le Mans	12	2	13.5	**.500**	.273	.769	1.7	.7	.8	.4	4.3	4.6
2007–08	Le Mans	**13**	**13**	26.6	.453	.290	.667	3.5	2.7	1.5	.5	8.5	9.6
2011–12	Nancy	6	6	**37.6**	.415	**.333**	**.818**	**6.7**	**5.2**	**1.7**	**.7**	**15.8**	**23.2**
Career		31	21	23.6	.449	.298	.765	3.4	2.4	1.2	.5	8.3	10.3

== Personal life ==
In March 2017, Batum became a shareholder in Infinity Nine Sports, the company owned by Tony Parker, which runs French basketball club ASVEL Basket, and took over the position as director of basketball operations at ASVEL. He stepped down from the position in the summer of 2024.

== See also ==
- List of NBA career 3-point scoring leaders
- List of European basketball players in the United States
