= Dewarick Spencer =

American basketball player (born 1982)

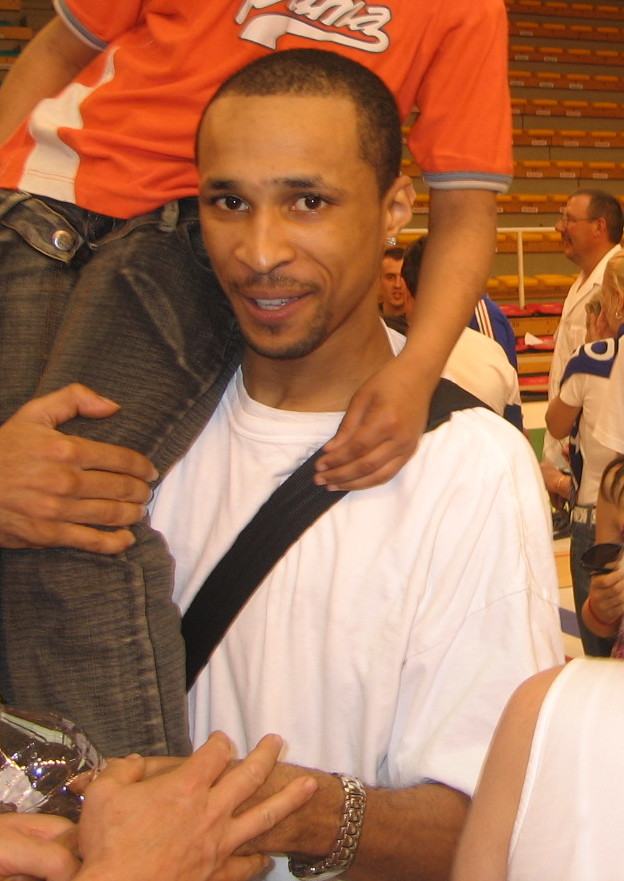
- Sepencer in 2007

No. 3 – AlKaramah SC
- Position: Point guard / shooting guard
- League: FIBA Intercontinental Cup

Personal information
- Born: May 4, 1982 (age 44) Mobile County, Alabama, U.S.
- Listed height: 6 ft 4 in (1.93 m)
- Listed weight: 210 lb (95 kg)

Career information
- High school: Baker (Mobile, Alabama)
- College: Iowa Western CC (2000–2001); Faulkner State CC (2001–2002); Arkansas State (2003–2005)
- NBA draft: 2005: undrafted
- Playing career: 2005–present

Career history
- 2005–2007: Chorale Roanne
- 2007–2008: Virtus Bologna
- 2008: Efes Pilsen
- 2008–2010: Le Mans Sarthe
- 2010–2011: Budivelnyk Kyiv
- 2011–2012: Al Riyadi Beirut
- 2012–2013: Jilin Northeast Tigers
- 2013: Al Riyadi Beirut
- 2013: Petrochimi Bandar Imam
- 2013: Zhejiang Golden Bulls
- 2014: Sagesse
- 2015: Al Mouttahed Tripoli
- 2015: Guaros de Lara
- 2015–2016: Seoul SK Knights
- 2016: Al Riyadi Beirut
- 2015–2017: Al Mouttahed Tripoli
- 2017: Goyang Orions
- 2017–2018: Champville SC
- 2019: Macau Black Bears
- 2020–2021: Telecom Egypt
- 2022–present: Zamalek

Career highlights
- 2x Pro A All Star; French League Foreign Player's MVP (2007); French League Best Scorer (2007); French All-Star Game MVP (2006); William Jones Cup MVP (2016); FIBA Asia Champions Cup MVP (2016); CBA Steals leader (2013); 2012 West Asian Championship MVP

Dewarick Antwain Spencer (born May 4, 1982) is an American professional basketball player who plays for AlKaramah SC of the Syrian Basketball League . Nicknamed "Dee," he is 6 ft 4 in (1.93 m) tall and plays both point guard and shooting guard positions.

From Mobile, Alabama, he played in college at Iowa Western CC from 2000–2001, Faulkner State CC from 2001–2002 and Arkansas State in the NCAA Division I from 2003–2005.

== Professional career ==
Spencer made a name for himself in Europe after winning the French League championship, the French League scoring title, the French League Foreign Player's MVP, and the French All-Star Game MVP during the 2006-07 season while he was with Chorale Roanne. In 2008, Spencer transferred from the Italian League club Virtus Bologna to the Turkish League club Efes Pilsen, after Efes released Drew Nicholas for refusing to travel with the team to Serbia.

For the 2008-09 season, he returned to France after signing with the EuroLeague club Le Mans. With Le Mans he won the French Semanes de As and French Cup in 2009. In 2010, he joined BC Budivelnyk in Ukraine.

In 2011 Dee Spencer won the gold of the Ukrainian championship with Budivelnik. He averaged 20,3 mpg, 10,4 ppg, 1,8 apg, 3,8 rpg with 9,5 EFF.

During 2013, he played in the Lebanese league with Sporting Al Riyadi Beirut basketball club. In August 2013, he signed with Petrochimi Bandar Imam. In December 2013, he was loaned to Zhejiang Golden Bulls. In March 2014, he came back to play in the Lebanese league but this time with Sagesse. In December 2014, he signed with Al Mouttahed Tripoli. In April 2015, he left Al Mouttahed and signed with Guaros de Lara of Venezuela.

In September 2017, Spencer signed with the Goyang Orions of the Korean Basketball League. In December 2017, he left Goyang and signed with Lebanese club Champville SC.

On January 16, 2022, Spencer was announced by Egyptian club Zamalek ahead of the 2022 FIBA Intercontinental Cup.
