= 2007–08 FIBA EuroCup Group D =

Basketball tournament group stage

These are the Group D Results and Standings:

Key to colors
Top two places in each group advance to Quarter-finals
Eliminated

== Standings ==
	Team	Pld	W	L	PF	PA	Diff
1.	(Latvia) Barons LMT	6	4	2	463	439	+24
2.	(Ukraine) Khimik	6	4	2	449	436	+13
3.	(Russia) Lokomotiv	6	2	4	432	438	-6
4.	(France) Cholet Basket	6	2	4	430	461	-31

== Results/Fixtures ==
All times given below are in Central European Time.

=== Game 1 ===
December 11–12, 2007

December 11
19:30

Lokomotiv (Russia)	69–73	(Latvia) Barons LMT
Scoring by quarter: 14-24, 24-11, 17-23, 14-15

Rostov

December 12
18:00

Khimik (Ukraine)	75–72	(France) Cholet Basket
Scoring by quarter: 16-19, 12-20, 20-10, 27-23

Yuzhny

=== Game 2 ===
December 18, 2007

December 18
20:30

Cholet Basket (France)	71–66	(Russia) Lokomotiv
Scoring by quarter: 14-21, 21-10, 13-9, 23-26

Cholet

December 18
20:30

Barons LMT (Latvia)	78–84	(Ukraine) Khimik
Scoring by quarter: 28-18, 22-25, 17-15, 11-26

Riga

=== Game 3 ===
January 8, 2008

January 8
19:30

Lokomotiv (Russia)	76–65	(Ukraine) Khimik
Scoring by quarter: 21-18, 17-15, 22-16, 16-16

Rostov

January 9
19:00

Barons LMT (Latvia)	76–66	(France) Cholet Basket
Scoring by quarter: 16-15, 15-12, 19-14, 26-25

Riga

=== Game 4 ===
January 15, 2008

January 15
20:30

Barons LMT (Latvia)	87–75	(Russia) Lokomotiv
Scoring by quarter: 17-18, 18-19, 26-20, 26-18

Riga

January 15
20:30

Cholet Basket (France)	77–82	(Ukraine) Khimik
Scoring by quarter: 23-25, 22-19, 18-21, 14-17

Cholet

=== Game 5 ===
January 22, 2008

January 22
18:00

Khimik (Ukraine)	65–71	(Latvia) Barons LMT
Scoring by quarter: 14-19, 12-13, 22-19, 17-20

Yuzhny

January 22
19:30

Lokomotiv (Russia)	84–64	(France) Cholet Basket
Scoring by quarter: 19-20, 22-12, 19-20, 24-12

Rostov

=== Game 6 ===
January 29, 2008

January 29
20:30

Khimik (Ukraine)	78–62	(Russia) Lokomotiv
Scoring by quarter: 15-17, 22-6, 16-21, 25-18

Yuzhny

January 29
20:30

Cholet Basket (France)	80–78	(Latvia) Barons LMT
Scoring by quarter: 16-21, 25-13, 20-21, 19-23

Cholet
