= 2007–08 Pro A season =

2007–08 LNB Pro A season
- League: LNB Pro A
- Sport: Basketball
- Games: 240 (regular season)
- Teams: 16
- TV partner: Sport+

Regular Season
- Top seed: Le Mans
- Season MVP: (United States) Marc Salyers (Roanne) (France) Nando de Colo (Cholet)
- Top scorer: (United States) Sean Colson (Hyères-Toulon)

2007-08 Finals
- Champions: Nancy
- Runners-up: Roanne

LNB Pro A seasons
- ← 2006–07 2008–09 →

The 2007–08 LNB Pro A season was the 86th season of the French Basketball Championship and the 21st season since inception of the Ligue Nationale de Basketball (LNB). The regular season started on September 29, 2007, and ended on May 14, 2008. The play-offs were held from May 20, 2008, till June 15, 2008.

Nancy, after finishing at the second top seed of the regular season, won the French Pro A League by defeating Roanne in playoffs final (84–53).

== Promotion and relegation ==
Due to the change of the Pro A league format from 18 clubs to 16 between the 2006–07 and 2007–08 seasons, only 1 club is promoted from 2006 to 2007 Pro B league (French 2nd division) and 3 clubs are sent to 2007-08 Pro B league.

At the beginning of the 2007–08 season

Teams promoted from 2006 to 2007 Pro B

- Vichy

Teams relegated to 2007–08 Pro B

- Besançon
- Bourg-en-Bresse
- Reims

At the end of the 2007–08 season

- 2007-08 Pro A Champion: Nancy

Teams promoted from 2007 to 2008 Pro B

- Rouen
- Besançon

Teams relegated to 2008–09 Pro B

- Paris-Levallois
- Clermont-Ferrand

== Team arenas ==
Location of teams in Pro A League 2007–08

Team	Home city	Stadium	Capacity
ÉS Chalon-sur-Saône	Chalon-sur-Saône	Le Colisée	4,070
Cholet Basket	Cholet	La Meilleraie	5,191
JDA Dijon	Dijon	Palais des Sports Jean-Michel Geoffroy	5,000
BCM Gravelines Dunkerque	Gravelines	Sportica	3,500
Hyères Toulon Var Basket	Hyères – Toulon	Palais des Sports de Toulon; Espace 3000	4,700; 2,200
STB Le Havre	Le Havre	Salle des Docks Océane	3,598
Le Mans Sarthe Basket	Le Mans	Antarès	6,003
ASVEL Basket	Lyon – Villeurbanne	Astroballe	5,643
SLUC Nancy Basket	Nancy	Palais des Sports Jean Weille	6,027
Orléans Loiret Basket	Orléans	Zénith d'Orléans	5,338
Paris-Levallois Basket	Paris-Levallois	Stade Pierre-de-Coubertin; Palais des Sports Marcel Cerdan	4,200; 4,000
Élan Béarnais Pau-Orthez	Pau-Orthez	Palais des Sports de Pau	7,813
Chorale Roanne Basket	Roanne	Halle André Vacheresse	5,020
SPO Rouen Basket	Rouen	Salle des Cotonniers	1,300
Strasbourg IG	Strasbourg	Rhénus Sport	6,200
JA Vichy	Vichy	Palais des Sports Pierre Coulon	3,300

== Team standings ==
Clinched playoff berth
Relegated

#	Team	Pld	W	L	PF	PA
1	Le Mans	30	23	7	2358	2176
2	Nancy	30	21	9	2466	2209
3	Lyon-Villeurbanne	30	21	9	2574	2348
4	Roanne	30	19	11	2480	2363
5	Le Havre	30	18	12	2537	2456
6	Hyères Toulon	30	17	13	2437	2376
7	Vichy	30	17	13	2048	2027
8	Cholet	30	15	15	2247	2265
9	Chalon-sur-Saône	30	13	17	2247	2268
10	Dijon	30	13	17	2366	2419
11	Pau-Lacq-Orthez	30	13	17	2298	2379
12	Strasbourg	30	12	18	2240	2295
13	Orléans	30	12	18	2155	2235
14	Gravelines-Dunkerque	30	11	19	2323	2442
15	Paris-Levallois	30	10	20	2172	2299
16	Clermont-Ferrand	30	4	26	2050	2441

== Playoffs ==
Quarter Finals
1	Le Mans	2
8	Cholet	0
4	Roanne	2
5	Le Havre	1
2	Nancy	2
7	Vichy	0
3	Lyon-Villeurbanne	2
6	Hyères-Toulon	0

Semifinals
1	Le Mans	1
4	Roanne	2
2	Nancy	2
3	Lyon-Villeurbanne	1

Finals
4	Roanne	53
2	Nancy	84

== Awards ==
=== Regular season MVPs ===
- "Foreign" MVP: (United States) Marc Salyers (Roanne)
- "French" MVP: (France) Nando de Colo (Cholet)

=== Best Coach ===
- (France) Christian Monschau (Le Havre)

=== Most Improved Player ===
- (France) Nando de Colo (Cholet)

=== Best Defensive Player ===
- (France) Dounia Issa (Vichy)

=== Rising Star Award ===
- (France) Nicolas Batum (Le Mans)

=== Player of the month ===
Month	Player	Team
October	(United States) Marc Salyers	Roanne
November	(United States) Jimmal Ball	Vichy
December	(France) Cyril Julian	Nancy
January	(Dominican Republic) Ricardo Greer	Nancy
February	(United States) Antonio Graves	Pau-Lacq-Orthez
March	(France) Nicolas Batum	Le Mans
April	(United States) Marc Salyers	Roanne
