= Chorale Roanne Basket =

Basketball team in Roanne, France

Chorale Roanne
- Leagues: LNB Élite
- Founded: 1937; 89 years ago
- Arena: Halle André Vacheresse
- Capacity: 5,020
- Location: Roanne, France
- Team colors: White, Navy, Blue, Orange
- President: Daniel Pérez
- Head coach: T. J. Parker
- Championships: 2 French Championships; 3 Pro B 2 Pro B Leaders Cup; 1 La Semaine des As Cup
- Website: chorale-roanne.com
Home	Away

Chorale Roanne Basket is a professional basketball club that is based in Roanne, France. The club plays in the first division LNB Élite. Their home arena is Halle André Vacheresse. The club was founded in 1937 and the team's colors are blue and white.

== History ==
In Chorale's history, the team won two national titles; in 1959 and most recent in 2007. The teams honour list also includes a La Semaine des As Cup (in 2007) and multiple European campaigns. In the 2007–08 season, the club even played in the top level Euroleague. In the 2013–14 season, the club was relegated to the LNB Pro B.

Former logo (2007–2014)

In the 2018–19 season, Roanne won the Pro B championship and promoted back to the Pro A after a five-year absence.

== Season by season ==
Season	Tier	League	Pos.	French Cup	Leaders Cup	European competitions	
2006–07	1	Pro A	1st		Champion		
2007–08	1	Pro A	2nd	Round of 32	Quarterfinalist	1 Euroleague	RS
2008–09	1	Pro A	5th	Semifinalist	Semifinalist	2 Eurocup	RS
2009–10	1	Pro A	3rd	Round of 32	Semifinalist	3 EuroChallenge	3rd
2010–11	1	Pro A	6th	Round of 32	Quarterfinalist	1 Euroleague	QR1
2010–11	1	Pro A	6th	Round of 32	Quarterfinalist	2 Eurocup	RS
2011–12	1	Pro A	8th	Quarterfinalist	Quarterfinalist	3 EuroChallenge	QF
2012–13	1	Pro A	6th	Round of 16	Quarterfinalist		
2013–14	1	Pro A	15th	Quarterfinalist			
2014–15	2	Pro B	8th				
2015–16	2	Pro B	16th				
2016–17	2	Pro B	15th				

== Achievements ==
- French Championship
  - Champions (2): 1958–59, 2006–07
- French Cup
  - Runner-up (1): 1963–64
- La Semaine des As Cup
  - Winners (1): 2007
- LNB Pro B Leaders Cup
  - Winners (2): 2017, 2019

== Players ==
=== Current roster ===
Chorale Roanne roster
Players
Coaches

Pos.	No.	Nat.	Name	Ht.	Age
SG	0	(Canada)	Blair, Jahvon	1.92 m (6 ft 4 in)	28 – 27 March 1998
F/C	1	(France)	Leopold, Florian	2.04 m (6 ft 8 in)	26 – 28 July 2000
G	2	(France)	Gauthier, Harvey	1.86 m (6 ft 1 in)	25 – 22 March 2001
PG	3	(United States)	Johnson, Darius	1.85 m (6 ft 1 in)	24 – 5 February 2002
G/F	4	(Portugal)	Williams, Travante	1.93 m (6 ft 4 in)	33 – 29 July 1993
SF	5	(France)	Affo Mama, Dylan	1.96 m (6 ft 5 in)	27 – 22 July 1999
F	7	(France)	Roos, Maxime	2.03 m (6 ft 8 in)	31 – 23 March 1995
G	8	(France)	Diot, Antoine	1.93 m (6 ft 4 in)	37 – 17 January 1989
G	15	(Montenegro) (United States)	Needham, Derek	1.80 m (5 ft 11 in)	36 – 20 October 1990
PF	16	(The Bahamas)	Levarity, Aaron	2.03 m (6 ft 8 in)	29 – 16 April 1997
C	20	(France)	Mbaya, Yvann	2.08 m (6 ft 10 in)	25 – 23 February 2001
PF	30	(France)	Monrazel, Ludjian	2.02 m (6 ft 8 in)	22 – 4 April 2004
C	35	(United States)	Hannah, Darius	2.06 m (6 ft 9 in)	24 – 5 August 2002
SF	42	(France)	Bria, Anthony	1.97 m (6 ft 6 in)	17 – 27 December 2008

Head coach

- (France) T. J. Parker

Assistant coach(es)

- (France) Morgan Belnou
- (France) Aymeric Bellour

Legend

- (C) Team captain
- Injured

- Roster
Updated: August 30, 2026

Note: Flags indicate national team eligibility at FIBA-sanctioned events. Players may hold other non-FIBA nationalities not displayed.

=== Individual awards ===
Pro A Foreign MVP

- Dewarick Spencer – 2007
- Marc Salyers – 2008

=== Notable players ===
Note: Flags indicate national team eligibility at FIBA-sanctioned events. Players may hold other non-FIBA nationalities not displayed.

Criteria

To appear in this section a player must have either:

- Set a club record or won an individual award while at the club
- Played at least one official international match for their national team at any time
- Played at least one official NBA match at any time.

- (Cameroon) Ben Mbala 2018-present
- (Canada) Jackson Rowe 2020-21
- (Finland) Antti Kanervo 2016–17
- (Finland) Matti Nuutinen
- (France) Pape Badiane 2005-08
- (France) Laurent Cazalon 2000-03; 2006-
- (France) Alain Gilles 1962-65
- (France) Marc-Antoine Pellin 2005-10
- (France) André Vacheresse 1942-60
- (France) Luc-Arthur Vebobe
- (France) Henri Villecourt 1956-60
- (France) Guerschon Yabusele 2013-15
- (France) (Israel) Arthur Rozenfeld 2016-17
- (Senegal) Makhtar N'Diaye 1999–01; 2003–04
- (Serbia) Dušan Kecman 2012-13
- (Sweden) Kenny Grant
- (South Sudan) (United States) Nuni Omot
- (United States) (Puerto Rico) John Holland
- (United States) Mike Bauer 2005-06
- (United States) Ricky Davis 2011
- (United States) Fennis Dembo 1990-92
- (United States) Aaron Harper 2005-07
- (United States) Cedric Henderson 1990-92
- (United States) Marc Salyers 2006-08
- (United States) Dewarick Spencer 2005-07
- (United States) Terry Stotts 1988-89
- (United States) David Thirdkill 1989-90
- (United States) Justin Wright-Foreman

== Head coaches ==
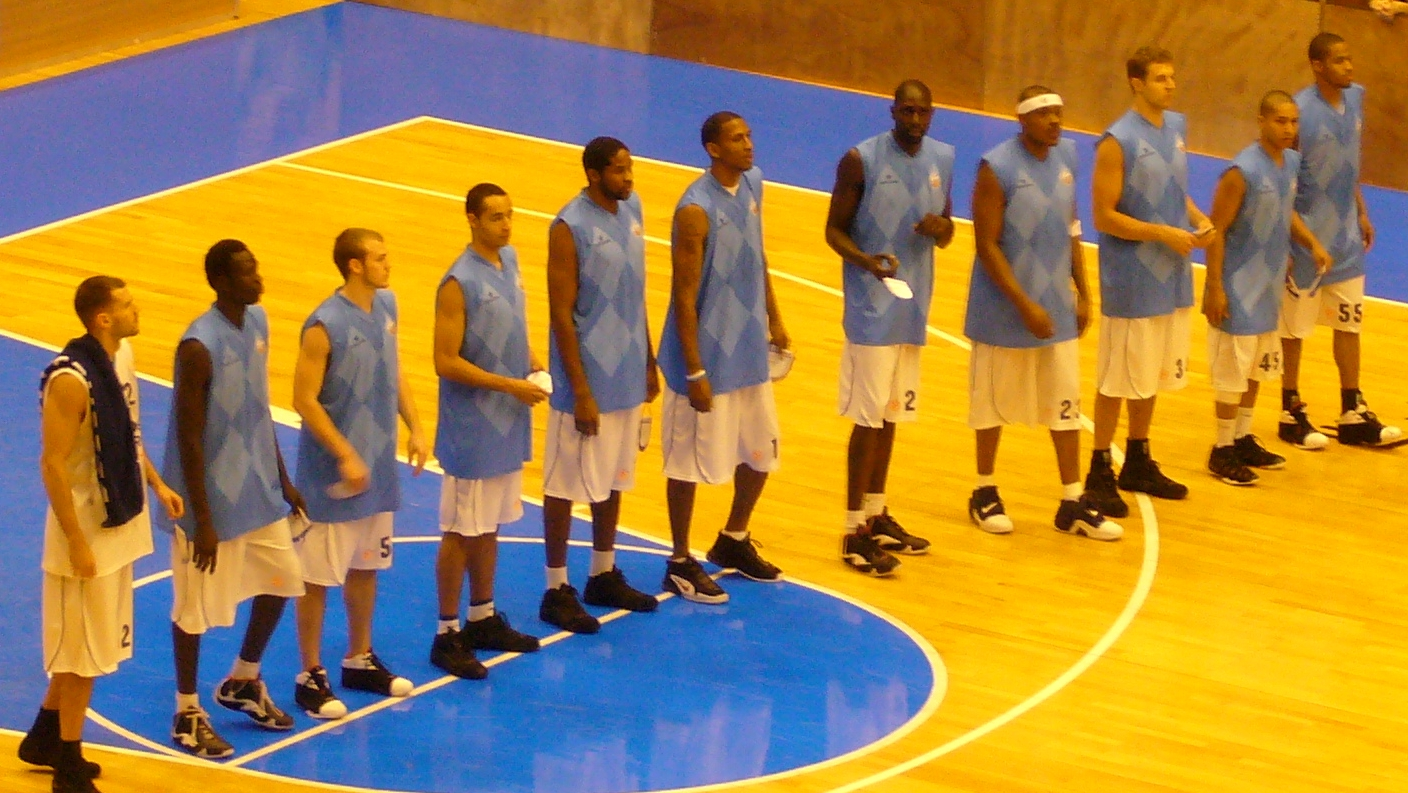
The 2007-08 team before a match with Fenerbahçe Ülker.

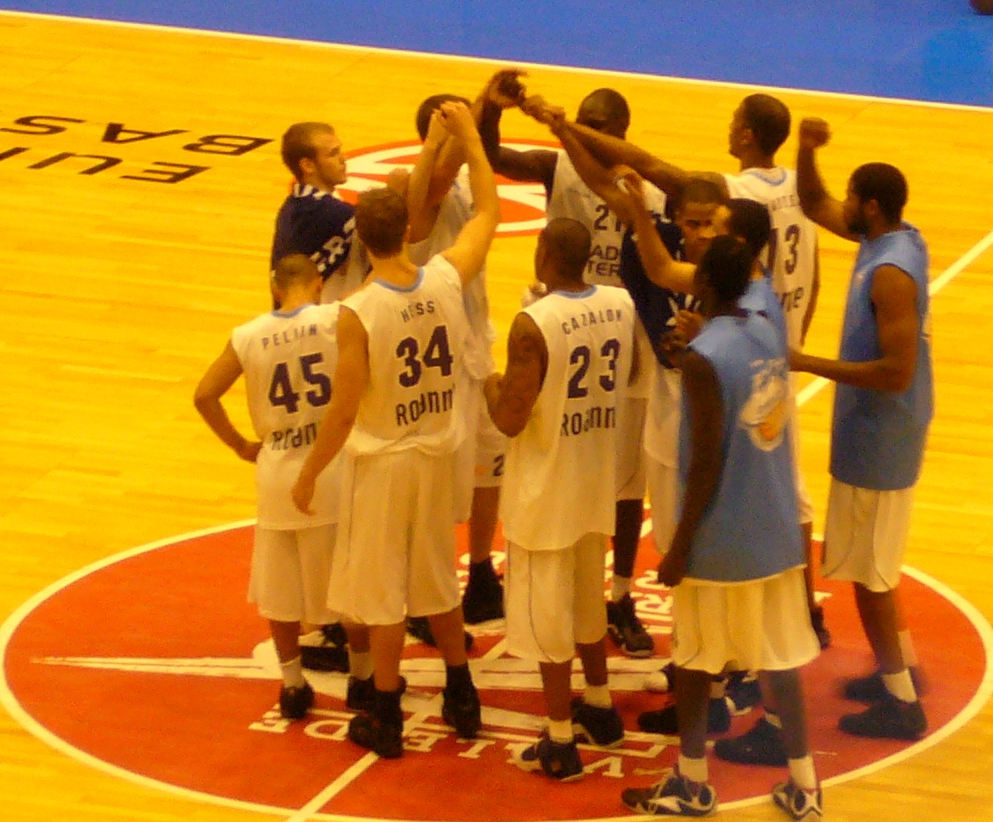
The 2007-08 team huddle before a match with Fenerbahçe Ülker.

- 2011-14 : (Montenegro) Luka Pavićević
- 2000-11 : (France) Jean-Denys Choulet
- 1998-00 : (France) Mike Gonsalves
- 1996-98 : (France) Patrick Macazaga
- 1993-96 : (France) Gilles Versier
- 1988-93 : (France) Alain Thinet
- 1985-88 : (France) André Jacquemot
- 1984-85 : (France) Yvon Leca
- 1983-84 : (France) Alain Monestier
- 1982-83 : (France) Jacky Odin
- 1980-82 : (France) Jean-Paul Pupunat
- 1977-80 : (France) André Vacheresse
- 1975-77 : (France) Jeff Dubreuil
- 1974-75 : (United States) Dick Smith
- 1972-74 : (Czech Republic) Ludvick Luttna
- 1971-72 : (France) Gérard Sturla
- 1970-71 : (France) Lucien Piegad
- 1961-69 : (France) Maurice Marcelot
- 1945-61 : (France) André Vacheresse
