= Halle André Vacheresse =

Indoor sporting arena in Roanne, France

Coordinates: 46.031340°N 4.051552°E

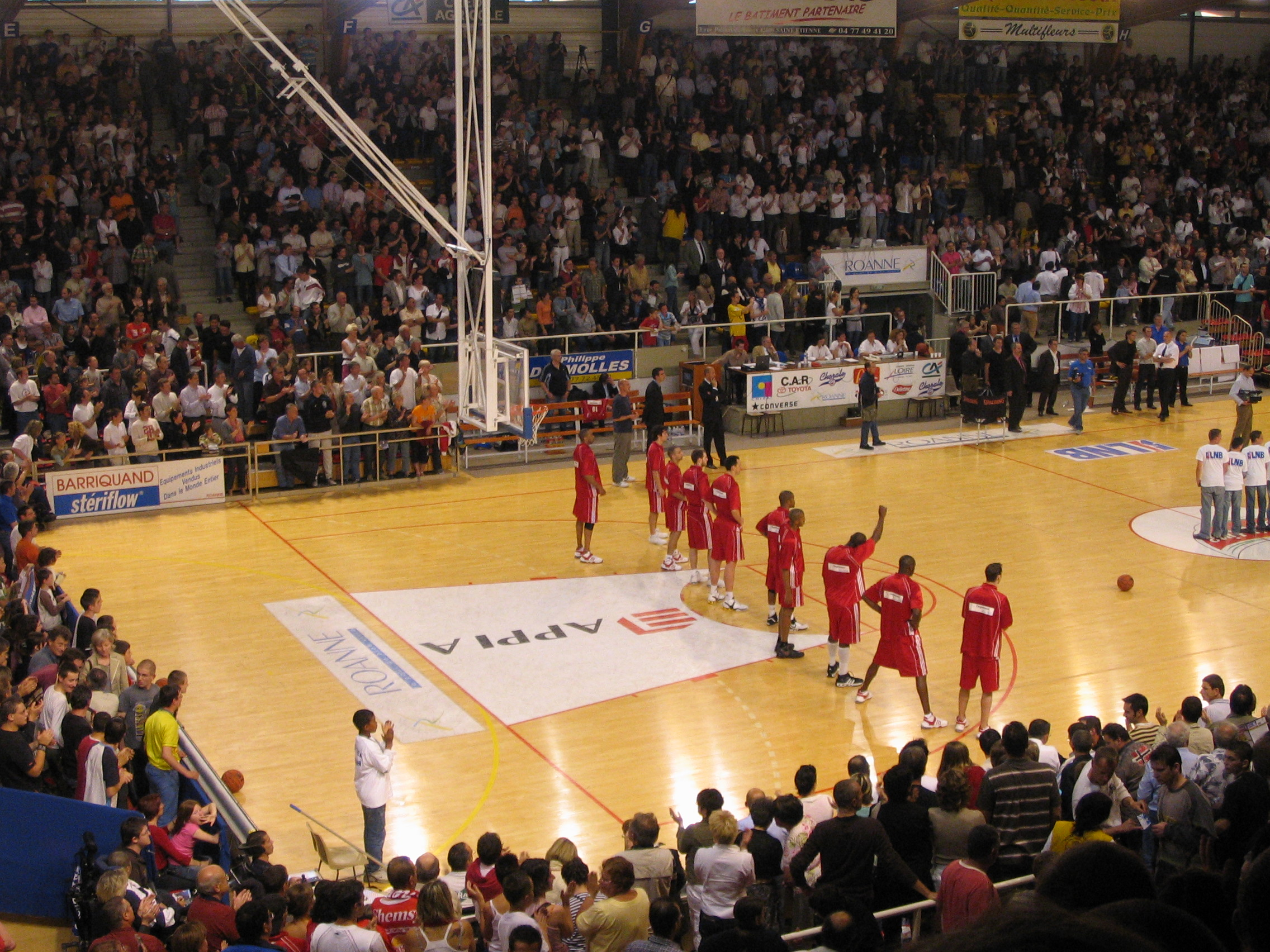

Halle André Vacheresse is an indoor sporting arena located in Roanne, France. The capacity of the arena is 5,020 people, and is currently home to the Chorale Roanne Basket basketball team.
